= 2022 Rajya Sabha elections =

Elections for the upper house of Indian Parliament

- April – September 2022

74 (Note: Including 4 casual vacancies) of the 233 (Note: excluding 12 nominated seats) elected seats in the Rajya Sabha 122 (Note: out of 243 (excluding 2 vacancies and including 12 nominated seats)) total seats needed for a majority
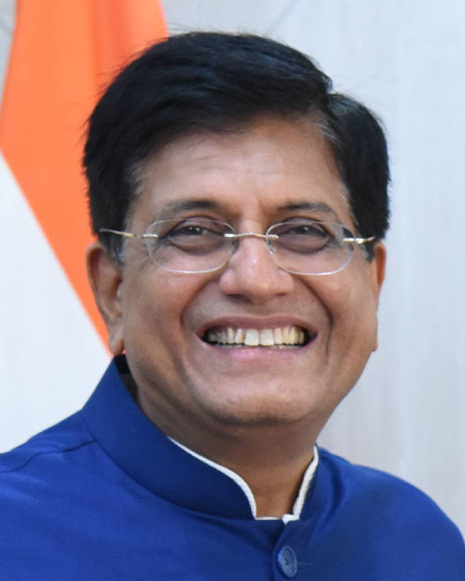

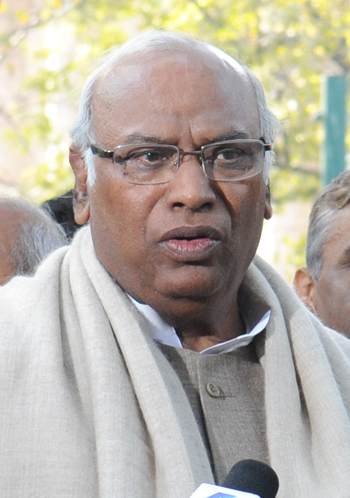
	First party	Second party
Leader	Piyush Goyal	Mallikarjun Kharge
Party	BJP	INC
Alliance	NDA	UPA
Leader since	14 July 2021	16 February 2021
Seats before	88 (Note: excluding 9 nominated members)	34
Seats after	88 (Note: excluding 7 nominated members)	31
Seat change	Steady	▼3
Alliance seats before	103 (Note: excluding 12 nominated members)	55
Alliance seats after	101 (Note: excluding 10 nominated members)	54
Seat change	▼2	▼1
Majority before election
None
Majority after
election
None

Rajya Sabha elections were held throughout 2022, to elect new members to replace those retiring from the Rajya Sabha, the Indian Parliament's upper house.

== Results ==
Alliance/ Party			Seats	+/–			
Alliance/ Party				NDA	Bharatiya Janata Party	27	0
All India Anna Dravida Munnetra Kazhagam	2	-1		NDA			
United People's Party Liberal	1	+1		NDA			
Independent (Kartikeya Sharma)	1	+1		NDA			
Naga People's Front	0	-1		NDA			
Shiromani Akali Dal (Sanyukt)	0	-1		NDA			
Independent (Subhash Chandra)	0	-1		NDA			
Total	31	-2		NDA			
UPA		Indian National Congress	10	-3			
UPA		Dravida Munnetra Kazhagam	3	0			
UPA		Rashtriya Janata Dal	2	+1			
UPA		Janata Dal (United)	2	0			
UPA		Nationalist Congress Party	1	0			
UPA		Jharkhand Mukti Morcha	1	+1			
UPA	Total		19	-1			
Others		Aam Aadmi Party	7	+7			
Others		Biju Janata Dal	4	0			
Others		Yuvajana Sramika Rythu Congress Party	4	+3			
Others		Telangana Rashtra Samithi	3	0			
Others		Communist Party of India (Marxist)	1	-1			
Others		Communist Party of India	1	+1			
Others		Rashtriya Lok Dal	1	+1			
Others		Shiv Sena (Uddhav Balasaheb Thackeray)	1	0			
Others		Samajwadi Party	1	-2			
Others		Independent (Kapil Sibal)	1	+1			
Others		Loktantrik Janata Dal	0	-1			
Others		Shiromani Akali Dal	0	-2			
Others		Bahujan Samaj Party	0	-2			

== Members retiring and elected ==
Note:

- Listed according to date of retirement

=== Assam ===
No	Previous MP	Party	Term end	Elected MP	Party	Ref.
1	Ripun Bora	INC	02-Apr-2022	Rwngwra Narzary	UPPL	
2	Ranee Narah	INC	02-Apr-2022	Pabitra Margherita	BJP	

=== Himachal Pradesh ===
No	Previous MP	Party	Term end	Elected MP	Party	Ref.
1	Anand Sharma	INC	02-Apr-2022	Sikander Kumar	BJP	

=== Kerala ===
No	Previous MP	Party	Term end	Elected MP	Party	Ref.
1	A. K. Antony	INC	02-Apr-2022	Jebi Mather	INC	
2	K. Somaprasad	CPI(M)	02-Apr-2022	A. A. Rahim	CPI(M)	
3	M. V. Shreyams Kumar	LJD	02-Apr-2022	P. Santhosh Kumar	CPI	

==== Nagaland ====
No	Previous MP	Party	Term end	Elected MP	Party	Ref.
1	K. G. Kenye	NPF	02-Apr-2022	Phangnon Konyak	BJP	

==== Tripura ====
No	Previous MP	Party	Term end	Elected MP	Party	Ref.
1	Jharna Das	CPI(M)	02-Apr-2022	Manik Saha	BJP	

==== Punjab ====
No	Previous MP	Party	Term end	Elected MP	Party	Ref.
1	Sukhdev Singh Dhindsa	SAD(S)	9 April 2022	Harbhajan Singh	AAP	
2	Naresh Gujral	SAD	9 April 2022	Raghav Chadha	AAP	
3	Pratap Singh Bajwa	INC	9 April 2022	Sandeep Pathak	AAP	
4	Shamsher Singh Dullo	INC	9 April 2022	Ashok Mittal	AAP	
5	Shwait Malik	BJP	9 April 2022	Sanjeev Arora	AAP	
6	Balwinder Singh Bhunder	SAD	4 July 2022	Balbir Singh Seechewal	AAP	
7	Ambika Soni	INC	4 July 2022	Vikramjit Singh Sahney	AAP	

==== Andhra Pradesh ====
No	Previous MP	Party	Term end	Elected MP	Party
1	V. Vijayasai Reddy	YSRCP	21 June 2022	V. Vijayasai Reddy	YSRCP
2	Suresh Prabhu	BJP	21 June 2022	R. Krishnaiah	YSRCP
3	Sujana Chowdary	BJP	21 June 2022	S. Niranjan Reddy	YSRCP
4	T. G. Venkatesh	BJP	21 June 2022	Beeda Masthan Rao	YSRCP

==== Telangana ====
No	Previous MP	Party	Term end	Elected MP	Party	Ref.
1	V. Lakshmikantha Rao	TRS	21 June 2022	B. Parthasaradhi Reddy	TRS	
2	D. Srinivas	TRS	21 June 2022	D. Damodar Rao	TRS	

==== Chhattisgarh ====
No	Previous MP	Party	Term end	Elected MP	Party	Ref.
1	Ramvichar Netam	BJP	29-Jun-2022	Rajeev Shukla	INC	
2	Chhaya Verma	INC	29-Jun-2022	Ranjeet Ranjan	INC	

==== Madhya Pradesh ====
No	Previous MP	Party	Term end	Elected MP	Party	Ref.
1	M. J. Akbar	BJP	29-Jun-2022	Kavita Patidar	BJP	
2	Sampatiya Uikey	BJP	29-Jun-2022	Sumitra Valmiki	BJP	
3	Vivek Tankha	INC	29-Jun-2022	Vivek Tankha	INC	

==== Tamil Nadu ====
No	Previous MP	Party	Term end	Elected MP	Party	Ref.
1	R. S. Bharathi	DMK	29-Jun-2022	R. Girirajan	DMK	
2	T. K. S. Elangovan	DMK	29-Jun-2022	S. Kalyanasundaram	DMK	
3	K. R. N. Rajeshkumar	DMK	29-Jun-2022	K. R. N. Rajeshkumar	DMK	
4	A. Navaneethakrishnan	AIADMK	29-Jun-2022	P. Chidambaram	INC	
5	S. R. Balasubramoniyan	AIADMK	29-Jun-2022	C. V. Shanmugam	AIADMK	
6	A. Vijayakumar	AIADMK	29-Jun-2022	R. Dharmar	AIADMK	

==== Karnataka ====
No	Previous MP	Party	Term end	Elected MP	Party	Ref.
1	Nirmala Sitharaman	BJP	30-Jun-2022	Nirmala Sitharaman	BJP	
2	K. C. Ramamurthy	BJP	30-Jun-2022	Jaggesh	BJP	
3	Vacant (Oscar Fernandes)			Lehar Singh Siroya	BJP	
4	Jairam Ramesh	INC	30-Jun-2022	Jairam Ramesh	INC	

==== Odisha ====
No	Previous MP	Party	Term end	Elected MP	Party	Ref.
1	Sasmit Patra	BJD	1 July 2022	Sasmit Patra	BJD	
2	Prasanna Acharya	BJD	1 July 2022	Manas Ranjan Mangaraj	BJD	
3	N. Bhaskar Rao	BJD	1 July 2022	Sulata Deo	BJD	

==== Maharashtra ====
No	Previous MP	Party	Term end	Elected MP	Party	Ref.
1	Piyush Goyal	BJP	04-Jul-2022	Piyush Goyal	BJP	
2	Vinay Sahasrabuddhe	BJP	04-Jul-2022	Anil Sukhdevrao Bonde	BJP	
3	Vikas Mahatme	BJP	04-Jul-2022	Dhananjay Mahadik	BJP	
4	Praful Patel	NCP	04-Jul-2022	Praful Patel	NCP	
5	P. Chidambaram	INC	04-Jul-2022	Imran Pratapgarhi	INC	
6	Sanjay Raut	SS	04-Jul-2022	Sanjay Raut	SS	

==== Rajasthan ====
No	Previous MP	Party	Term end	Elected MP	Party	Ref.
1	Om Prakash Mathur	BJP	04-Jul-2022	Randeep Surjewala	INC	
2	Ram Kumar Verma	BJP	04-Jul-2022	Mukul Wasnik	INC	
3	Harshvardhan Singh Dungarpur	BJP	04-Jul-2022	Pramod Tiwari	INC	
4	Alphons Kannanthanam	BJP	04-Jul-2022	Ghanshyam Tiwari	BJP	

==== Uttar Pradesh ====
No	Previous MP	Party	Term end	Elected MP	Party	Ref.
1	Surendra Singh Nagar	BJP	04-Jul-2022	Surendra Singh Nagar	BJP	
2	Shiv Pratap Shukla	BJP	04-Jul-2022	Laxmikant Bajpai	BJP	
3	Sanjay Seth	BJP	04-Jul-2022	Radha Mohan Das Agarwal	BJP	
4	Jai Prakash Nishad	BJP	04-Jul-2022	Baburam Nishad	BJP	
5	Syed Zafar Islam	BJP	04-Jul-2022	Sangeeta Yadav	BJP	
6	Rewati Raman Singh	SP	04-Jul-2022	Darshana Singh	BJP	
7	Sukhram Singh Yadav	SP	04-Jul-2022	Mithlesh Kumar	BJP	
8	Vishambhar Prasad Nishad	SP	04-Jul-2022	K. Laxman	BJP	
9	Satish Chandra Mishra	BSP	04-Jul-2022	Jayant Chaudhary	RLD	
10	Ashok Siddharth	BSP	04-Jul-2022	Javed Ali Khan	SP	
11	Kapil Sibal	INC	04-Jul-2022	Kapil Sibal	IND	

=== Uttarakhand ===
No	Previous MP	Party	Term end	Elected MP	Party	Ref.
1	Pradeep Tamta	INC	04-Jul-2022	Kalpana Saini	BJP	

==== Bihar ====
No	Previous MP	Party	Term end	Elected MP	Party	Ref.
1	Gopal Narayan Singh	BJP	07-Jul-2022	Shambhu Sharan Patel	BJP	
2	Satish Chandra Dubey	BJP	07-Jul-2022	Satish Chandra Dubey	BJP	
3	Ramchandra Prasad Singh	JD(U)	07-Jul-2022	Khiru Mahto	JD(U)	
4	Vacant (Sharad Yadav)			Faiyaz Ahmad	RJD	
5	Misa Bharti	RJD	07-Jul-2022	Misa Bharti	RJD	

==== Jharkhand ====
No	Previous MP	Party	Term end	Elected MP	Party	Ref.
1	Mukhtar Abbas Naqvi	BJP	07-Jul-2022	Aditya Sahu	BJP	
2	Mahesh Poddar	BJP	07-Jul-2022	Mahua Maji	JMM	

==== Haryana ====
No	Previous MP	Party	Term end	Elected MP	Party	Ref.
1	Dushyant Kumar Gautam	BJP	01-Aug-2022	Krishan Lal Panwar	BJP	
2	Subhash Chandra	IND	01-Aug-2022	Kartikeya Sharma	IND	

== By-elections ==
Aside from automatic elections, unforeseen vacancies caused by members' resignation, death or disqualification, are unless a few months before the expected natural expiry of the term of tenure, filled via by-elections, which for the Rajya Sabha often take some months to organise.

=== Bihar ===
- On 26 December 2021, Mahendra Prasad died

No	Former MP	Party	Date of vacancy	Elected MP	Party	Date of appointment	Date of retirement	Ref.
1	Mahendra Prasad	JD(U)	26 December 2021	Anil Hegde	JD(U)	30 May 2022	2 April 2024	

=== Telangana ===
- On 4 December 2021, Banda Prakash resigned

No	Former MP	Party	Date of vacancy	Elected MP	Party	Date of appointment	Date of retirement	Ref.
1	Banda Prakash	TRS	4 December 2021	Vaddiraju Ravi Chandra	TRS	25 May 2022	2 April 2024	

=== Odisha ===
- On 27 April 2022, Subhash Chandra Singh was elected the Mayor of Cuttack.

No	Former MP	Party	Date of vacancy	Elected MP	Party	Date of appointment	Date of retirement	Ref.
1	Subhash Chandra Singh	BJD	27 April 2022	Niranjan Bishi	BJD	13 June 2022	2 April 2026	

=== Tripura ===
- On 26 June 2022 Manik Saha was elected to the Tripura Legislative Assembly.

No	Former MP	Party	Date of vacancy	Elected MP	Party	Date of appointment	Date of retirement	Ref.
1	Manik Saha	BJP	26 June 2022	Biplab Deb	BJP	22 September 2022	2 April 2028	

== Nominations ==
=== Nominated members ===
No	Previous MP	Party	Term end	Nominated MP	Party	Date of appointment	Ref.
1	Narendra Jadhav	Nominated	24-Apr-2022	Ilaiyaraaja	Nominated	06-Jul-2022	
2	Mary Kom	Nominated	24-Apr-2022	P. T. Usha	Nominated	06-Jul-2022	
3	Roopa Ganguly	Nominated (BJP)	24-Apr-2022	V. Vijayendra Prasad	Nominated	06-Jul-2022	
4	Swapan Dasgupta	Nominated (BJP)	24-Apr-2022	Veerendra Heggade	Nominated	06-Jul-2022	
5	Suresh Gopi	Nominated (BJP)	24-Apr-2022	Ghulam Ali Khatana	Nominated (BJP)	10-Sep-2022	

== See also ==
- 2022 elections in India
- List of current members of the Rajya Sabha
