= 2028 Rajya Sabha elections =

Elections for the Upper House of Indian Parliament

- April and June 2028

70 of the 233 (Note: excluding 12 nominated seats) elected seats in the Rajya Sabha 123 (Note: out of 245 (including 12 nominated seats)) total seats needed for a majority
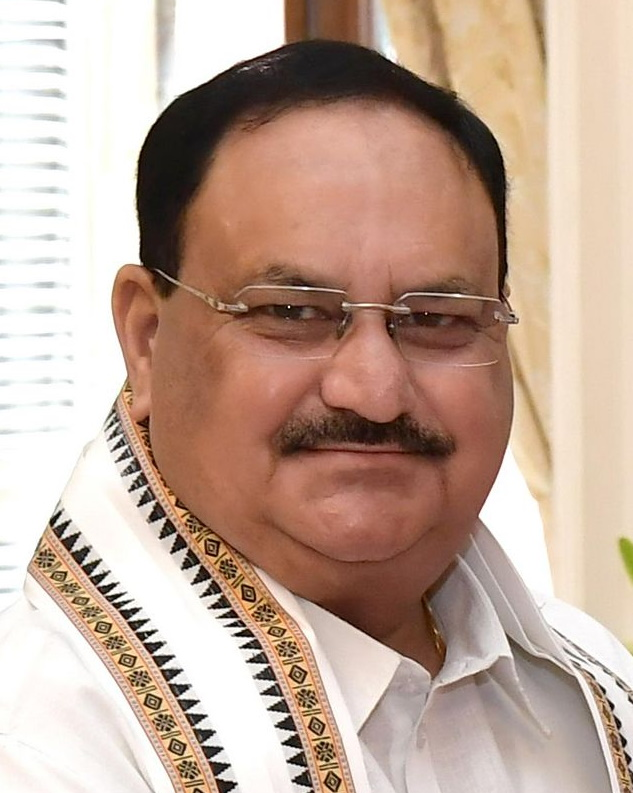

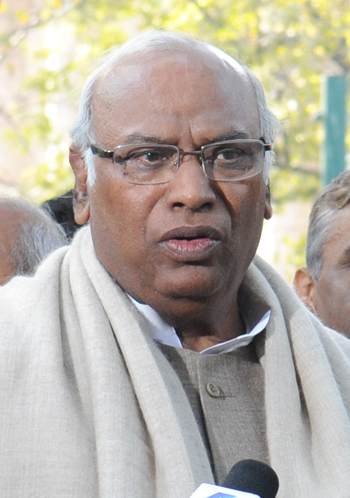
Leader	J. P. Nadda	Mallikarjun Kharge
Party	BJP	INC
Alliance	NDA	INDIA
Leader since	24 June 2024	16 February 2021
Incumbent Majority
National Democratic Alliance

The 2028 Rajya Sabha elections will be held as part of a routine six-year cycle of the upper house of the Parliament of India to elect 72 of its 245 members, of which the states through their legislators elect 233, and the remaining 12 are appointed by the President.

== Members retiring ==
=== Assam ===
#	Previous MP		Term end	Elected MP	
1	Pabitra Margherita	BJP	2-Apr-2028	TBD	BJP
2	Rwngwra Narzary	UPPL	2-Apr-2028	TBD	BPF

=== Himachal Pradesh ===
#	Previous MP		Term end	Elected MP
1	Sikander Kumar	BJP	2-Apr-2028	TBD

=== Kerala ===
#	Previous MP		Term end	Elected MP	
1	Jebi Mather	INC	2-Apr-2028	TBD	INC
2	A. A. Rahim	CPI(M)	2-Apr-2028		INC
3	P. Santhosh Kumar	CPI	2-Apr-2028		CPI

=== Nagaland ===
#	Previous MP		Term end	Elected MP
1	Phangnon Konyak	BJP	2-Apr-2028	TBD

=== Tripura ===
#	Previous MP		Term end	Elected MP
1	Rajib Bhattacharjee	BJP	2-Apr-2028	TBD

=== Punjab ===
#	Previous MP		Term end	Elected MP
1	Harbhajan Singh (Note: Defected from AAP to BJP in April 2026.)	BJP	9-Apr-2028	TBD
2	Raghav Chadha	BJP	9-Apr-2028	TBD
3	Sandeep Pathak	BJP	9-Apr-2028	TBD
4	Ashok Mittal	BJP	9-Apr-2028	TBD
5	Rajinder Gupta	BJP	9-Apr-2028	TBD
6	Vikramjit Singh Sahney	BJP	4-Jul-2028	TBD
7	Balbir Singh Seechewal	AAP	4-Jul-2028	TBD

=== Andhra Pradesh ===
#	Previous MP		Term end	Elected MP	
1	P. Venkata Satyanarayana	BJP	21-Jun-2028	TBD	TDP
2	R. Krishnaiah	BJP	21-Jun-2028		TDP
3	Beeda Masthan Rao	TDP	21-Jun-2028		TDP
4	S. Niranjan Reddy	YSRCP	21-Jun-2028		TDP

=== Telangana ===
#	Previous MP		Term end	Elected MP	
1	B. Parthasaradhi Reddy	BRS	21-Jun-2028	TBD	INC
2	D. Damodar Rao	BRS	21-Jun-2028		INC

=== Chhattisgarh ===
#	Previous MP		Term end	Elected MP
1	Rajeev Shukla	INC	28-Jun-2028	INC
2	Ranjeet Ranjan	INC	28-Jun-2028	BJP

=== Madhya Pradesh ===
#	Previous MP		Term end	Elected MP	
1	Kavita Patidar	BJP	29-Jun-2028		BJP
2	Sumitra Valmiki	BJP	29-Jun-2028	TBD	BJP
3	Vivek Tankha	INC	29-Jun-2028		INC

=== Tamil Nadu ===
#	Previous MP		Term end	Elected MP	
1	R. Dharmar	AIADMK	29-Jun-2028	TBD	AIADMK
2	R. Girirajan	DMK	29-Jun-2028		DMK
3	S. Kalyanasundaram	DMK	29-Jun-2028		TVK
4	K. R. N. Rajeshkumar	DMK	29-Jun-2028		TVK
5	P. Chidambaram	INC	29-Jun-2028		TVK
6	Praveen Chakravarty	INC	29-Jun-2028		TBD

=== Karnataka ===
#	Previous MP		Term end	Elected MP
1	Nirmala Sitharaman	BJP	30-Jun-2028	TBD
2	Jaggesh	BJP	30-Jun-2028	TBD
3	Lehar Singh Siroya	BJP	30-Jun-2028	TBD
4	Jairam Ramesh	INC	30-Jun-2028	TBD

=== Odisha ===
#	Previous MP		Term end	Elected MP	
1	Sulata Deo	BJD	1-Jul-2028	TBD	BJP
2	Manas Mangaraj	BJD	1-Jul-2028		BJP
3	Sasmit Patra	BJD	1-Jul-2028		BJD

=== Maharashtra ===
#	Previous MP		Term end	Elected MP	
1	Anil Bonde	BJP	4-Jul-2028	TBD	BJP
2	Dhananjay Mahadik	BJP	4-Jul-2028		BJP
3	Nitin Patil	NCP	4-Jul-2028		BJP
4	Rajendra Jain	NCP	4-Jul-2028		NCP
5	Sanjay Raut	SS(UBT)	4-Jul-2028		SHS
6	Imran Pratapgarhi	INC	4-Jul-2028		INC

=== Rajasthan ===
#	Previous MP		Term end	Elected MP	
1	Randeep Surjewala	INC	4-Jul-2028	TBD	INC
2	Mukul Wasnik	INC	4-Jul-2028		BJP
3	Pramod Tiwari	INC	4-Jul-2028		BJP
4	Ghanshyam Tiwari	BJP	4-Jul-2028		BJP

=== Uttar Pradesh ===
#	Previous MP		Term end	Elected MP
1	Surendra Singh Nagar	BJP	4-Jul-2028	TBD
2	Laxmikant Bajpai	BJP	4-Jul-2028	TBD
3	Radha Mohan Das Agarwal	BJP	4-Jul-2028	TBD
4	Baburam Nishad	BJP	4-Jul-2028	TBD
5	Sangeeta Yadav	BJP	4-Jul-2028	TBD
6	Darshana Singh	BJP	4-Jul-2028	TBD
7	Mithlesh Kumar	BJP	4-Jul-2028	TBD
8	K. Laxman	BJP	4-Jul-2028	TBD
9	Jayant Chaudhary	RLD	4-Jul-2028	TBD
10	Javed Ali Khan	SP	4-Jul-2028	TBD
11	Kapil Sibal	IND	4-Jul-2028	TBD

=== Uttarakhand ===
#	Previous MP		Term end	Elected MP
1	Kalpana Saini	BJP	4-Jul-2028	TBD

=== Bihar ===
#	Previous MP		Term end	Elected MP
1	Satish Chandra Dubey	BJP	7-Jul-2028	BJP
2	Manan Kumar Mishra	BJP	7-Jul-2028	BJP
3	Shambhu Sharan Patel	BJP	7-Jul-2028	JD(U)
4	Khiru Mahto	JDU	7-Jul-2028	JD(U)
5	Faiyaz Ahmad	RJD	7-Jul-2028	RJD

=== Jharkhand ===
#	Previous MP		Term end	Elected MP
1	Aditya Sahu	BJP	7-Jul-2028	BJP
2	Mahua Maji	JMM	7-Jul-2028	JMM

=== Haryana ===
#	Previous MP		Term end	Elected MP
1	Rekha Sharma	BJP	1-Aug-2028	BJP
2	Kartikeya Sharma	IND	1-Aug-2028	INC

=== Nominated ===
#	Previous MP		Term end	Elected MP
1	Ilaiyaraaja	NOM	6-Jul-2022	TBD
2	P. T. Usha	NOM	6-Jul-2022	TBD
3	V. Vijayendra Prasad	NOM	6-Jul-2022	TBD
4	Veerendra Heggade	NOM	6-Jul-2022	TBD
5	Ghulam Ali Khatana	BJP	10-Sep-2022	TBD
