= List of Rajya Sabha members from Tamil Nadu =

Members of the Upper House of Parliament from Tamil Nadu

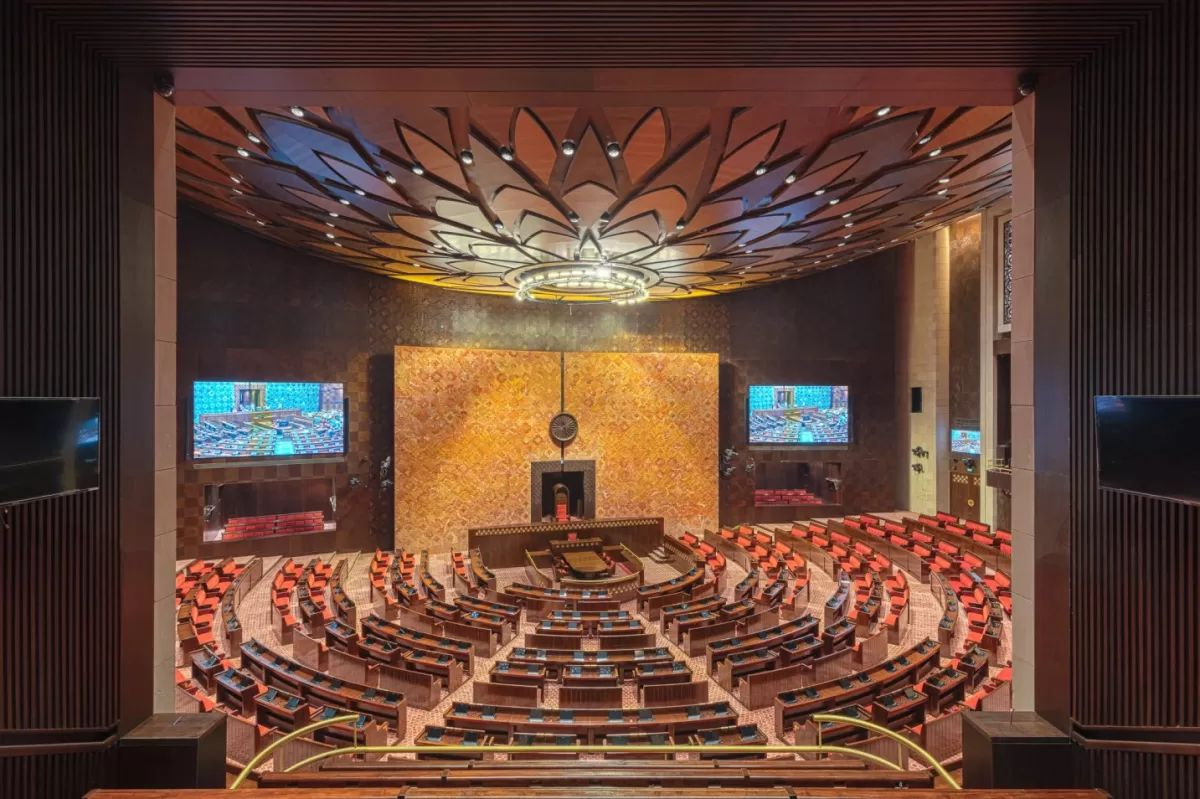
Rajya Sabha
(Council of States)

Members of parliament in the Rajya Sabha (Council of States) from Tamil Nadu are not directly elected by being voted upon by all adult citizens of the state but by the members of the Tamil Nadu Legislative Assembly. Candidates who win the Rajya Sabha elections are called "Members of Parliament" and hold their seats for six years. The house meets in the Rajya Sabha Chamber of the Sansad Bhavan in New Delhi on matters relating to the creation of new laws or removing or improving the existing laws that affect all citizens of India. Elections take place to elect 18 members from Tamil Nadu.

== Current members ==
Source: Digital Sansad

DMK (8) AIADMK (4) INC (3) DMDK (1) MNM (1) PMK (1)
No.	Name	Political party	Alliance	Date of		Total Term
No.	Name	Political party	Alliance	Appointment	Retirement	Total Term
1	M. Thambi Durai	All India Anna Dravida Munnetra Kazhagam	NDA	3 April 2026	2 April 2032	2
2	L. K. Sudhish	Desiya Murpokku Dravida Kazhagam	None	3 April 2026	2 April 2032	1
3	Tiruchi Siva	Dravida Munnetra Kazhagam	None	3 April 2026	2 April 2032	5
4	Constandine Ravindran	Dravida Munnetra Kazhagam	None	3 April 2026	2 April 2032	1
5	Christopher Manickam	Indian National Congress	INDIA	3 April 2026	2 April 2032	1
6	Anbumani Ramadoss	Pattali Makkal Katchi	NDA	3 April 2026	2 April 2032	3
7	I. S. Inbadurai	All India Anna Dravida Munnetra Kazhagam	NDA	25 July 2025	24 July 2031	1
8	M. Dhanapal	All India Anna Dravida Munnetra Kazhagam	NDA	25 July 2025	24 July 2031	1
9	P. Wilson	Dravida Munnetra Kazhagam	None	25 July 2025	24 July 2031	2
10	Rajathi	Dravida Munnetra Kazhagam	None	25 July 2025	24 July 2031	1
11	S. R. Sivalingam	Dravida Munnetra Kazhagam	None	25 July 2025	24 July 2031	1
12	Kamal Haasan	Makkal Needhi Maiam	None	25 July 2025	24 July 2031	1
13	Praveen Chakravarthy	Indian National Congress	INDIA	11 June 2026	29 June 2028	1
14	R. Dharmar	All India Anna Dravida Munnetra Kazhagam	NDA	30 June 2022	29 June 2028	1
15	K. R. N. Rajeshkumar	Dravida Munnetra Kazhagam	None	30 June 2022	29 June 2028	2
16	R. Girirajan	Dravida Munnetra Kazhagam	None	30 June 2022	29 June 2028	1
17	S. Kalyanasundaram	Dravida Munnetra Kazhagam	None	30 June 2022	29 June 2028	1
18	P. Chidambaram	Indian National Congress	INDIA	30 June 2022	29 June 2028	2

== Chronological list of all members ==
Name	Political party	Date of		Total Term	Vacation Date/Reason
Name	Political party	Appointment	Retirement	Total Term	Vacation Date/Reason
Praveen Chakravarthy	INC	11 June 2026	29 June 2028	1	Incumbent
M. Thambi Durai	AIADMK	3 April 2026	2 April 2032	2	Incumbent
L. K. Sudhish	DMDK	3 April 2026	2 April 2032	1	Incumbent
Tiruchi Siva	DMK	3 April 2026	2 April 2032	5	Incumbent
Constandine Ravindran	DMK	3 April 2026	2 April 2032	1	Incumbent
Christopher Manickam	INC	3 April 2026	2 April 2032	1	Incumbent
Anbumani Ramadoss	PMK	3 April 2026	2 April 2032	3	Incumbent
I. S. Inbadurai	AIADMK	25 July 2025	24 July 2031	1	Incumbent
M. Dhanapal	AIADMK	25 July 2025	24 July 2031	1	Incumbent
P. Wilson	DMK	25 July 2025	24 July 2031	2	Incumbent
Rajathi	DMK	25 July 2025	24 July 2031	1	Incumbent
S. R. Sivalingam	DMK	25 July 2025	24 July 2031	1	Incumbent
Kamal Haasan	MNM	25 July 2025	24 July 2031	1	Incumbent
C. Ve. Shanmugam	AIADMK	30 June 2022	29 June 2028	1	Resigned on 7 May 2026
R. Dharmar	AIADMK	30 June 2022	29 June 2028	1	Incumbent
K. R. N. Rajeshkumar	DMK	30 June 2022	29 June 2028	2	Incumbent
R. Girirajan	DMK	30 June 2022	29 June 2028	1	Incumbent
S. Kalyanasundaram	DMK	30 June 2022	29 June 2028	1	Incumbent
P. Chidambaram	INC	30 June 2022	29 June 2028	2	Incumbent
K. R. N. Rajeshkumar	DMK	27 September 2021	29 June 2022	1	Retirement
Kanimozhi NVN Somu	DMK	27 September 2021	2 April 2026	1	Retirement
M. Mohamed Abdulla	DMK	6 September 2021	24 July 2025	1	Retirement
K. P. Munusamy	AIADMK	3 April 2020	2 April 2026	1	Resigned on 7 May 2021
M. Thambi Durai	AIADMK	3 April 2020	2 April 2026	1	Retirement
Tiruchi Siva	DMK	3 April 2020	2 April 2026	4	Retirement
Anthiyur P. Selvarasu	DMK	3 April 2020	2 April 2026	1	Retirement
N. R. Elango	DMK	3 April 2020	2 April 2026	1	Retirement
G. K. Vasan	TMC(M)	3 April 2020	2 April 2026	3	Retirement
A. Mohammedjan	AIADMK	25 July 2019	24 July 2025	1	Died on 23 March 2021
N. Chandrasegharan	AIADMK	25 July 2019	24 July 2025	1	Retirement
M. Shanmugam	DMK	25 July 2019	24 July 2025	1	Retirement
P. Wilson	DMK	25 July 2019	24 July 2025	1	Retirement
Vaiko	MDMK	25 July 2019	24 July 2025	4	Retirement
Anbumani Ramadoss	PMK	25 July 2019	24 July 2025	2	Retirement
A. Navaneethakrishnan	AIADMK	30 June 2016	29 June 2022	2	Retirement
A. Vijayakumar	AIADMK	30 June 2016	29 June 2022	1	Retirement
R. Vaithilingam	AIADMK	30 June 2016	29 June 2022	1	Resigned on 7 May 2021
S. R. Balasubramoniyan	AIADMK	30 June 2016	29 June 2022	1	Retirement
R. S. Bharathi	DMK	30 June 2016	29 June 2022	1	Retirement
T. K. S. Elangovan	DMK	30 June 2016	29 June 2022	1	Retirement
A. Navaneethakrishnan	AIADMK	26 June 2014	29 June 2016	1	Retirement
A. K. Selvaraj	AIADMK	3 April 2014	2 April 2020	1	Retirement
S. Muthukaruppan	AIADMK	3 April 2014	2 April 2020	1	Retirement
Sasikala Pushpa	AIADMK	3 April 2014	2 April 2020	1	Retirement
Vijila Sathyananth	AIADMK	3 April 2014	2 April 2020	1	Retirement
T. K. Rangarajan	CPI(M)	3 April 2014	2 April 2020	2	Retirement
Tiruchi Siva	DMK	3 April 2014	2 April 2020	3	Retirement
V. Maitreyan	AIADMK	25 July 2013	24 July 2019	3	Retirement
K. R. Arjunan	AIADMK	25 July 2013	24 July 2019	1	Retirement
R. Lakshmanan	AIADMK	25 July 2013	24 July 2019	1	Retirement
T. Rathinavel	AIADMK	25 July 2013	24 July 2019	1	Retirement
D. Raja	CPI	25 July 2013	24 July 2019	2	Retirement
Kanimozhi Rajathi Karunanidhi	DMK	25 July 2013	24 July 2019	2	Elected to LS on 23 May 2019
A. W. Rabi Bernard	AIADMK	19 July 2011	29 June 2016	1	Retirement
K. V. Ramalingam	AIADMK	30 June 2010	29 June 2016	1	Resigned on 20 May 2011
Paul Manoj Pandian	AIADMK	30 June 2010	29 June 2016	1	Retirement
K. P. Ramalingam	DMK	30 June 2010	29 June 2016	1	Retirement
S. Thangavelu	DMK	30 June 2010	29 June 2016	1	Retirement
T. M. Selvaganapathi	DMK	30 June 2010	29 June 2016	1	Disqualified on 17 April 2014
E. M. Sudarsana Natchiappan	INC	30 June 2010	29 June 2016	2	Retirement
N. Balaganga	AIADMK	3 April 2008	2 April 2014	1	Retirement
T. K. Rangarajan	CPI(M)	3 April 2008	2 April 2014	1	Retirement
S. Amir Ali Jinnah	DMK	3 April 2008	2 April 2014	1	Retirement
Vasanthi Stanley	DMK	3 April 2008	2 April 2014	1	Retirement
Jayanthi Natarajan	INC	3 April 2008	2 April 2014	4	Retirement
G. K. Vasan	INC	3 April 2008	2 April 2014	2	Retirement
V. Maitreyan	AIADMK	25 July 2007	24 July 2013	2	Retirement
A. Elavarasan	AIADMK	25 July 2007	24 July 2013	1	Retirement
S. Krishnamoorthy	DMK	25 July 2007	24 July 2013	1	Retirement
Tiruchi Siva	DMK	25 July 2007	24 July 2013	2	Retirement
Kanimozhi Rajathi Karunanidhi	DMK	25 July 2007	24 July 2013	1	Retirement
B. S. Gnanadesikan	INC	25 July 2007	24 July 2013	2	Retirement
K. P. K. Kumaran	DMK	11 July 2006	24 July 2007	1	Retirement
K. Malaisamy	AIADMK	30 June 2004	29 June 2010	1	Retirement
N. R. Govindarajar	AIADMK	30 June 2004	29 June 2010	1	Retirement
S. Anbalagan	AIADMK	30 June 2004	29 June 2010	1	Retirement
T. T. V. Dhinakaran	AIADMK	30 June 2004	29 June 2010	1	Retirement
E. M. Sudarsana Natchiappan	INC	30 June 2004	29 June 2010	1	Retirement
Anbumani Ramadoss	PMK	30 June 2004	29 June 2010	1	Retirement
C. Perumal	AIADMK	3 April 2002	2 April 2008	1	Retirement
N. Jothi	AIADMK	3 April 2002	2 April 2008	1	Resigned on 27 March 2008
S. P. M. Syed Khan	AIADMK	3 April 2002	2 April 2008	1	Retirement
Thanga Tamil Selvan	AIADMK	3 April 2002	2 April 2008	1	Retirement
R. Shunmugasundaram	DMK	3 April 2002	2 April 2008	1	Retirement
G. K. Vasan	INC	3 April 2002	2 April 2008	1	Retirement
V. Maitreyan	AIADMK	15 January 2002	29 June 2004	1	Retirement
P. G. Narayanan	AIADMK	25 July 2001	24 July 2007	1	Retirement
R. Kamaraj	AIADMK	25 July 2001	24 July 2007	1	Retirement
S. Gokula Indira	AIADMK	25 July 2001	24 July 2007	1	Retirement
S. S. Chandran	AIADMK	25 July 2001	24 July 2007	1	Retirement
R. Sarath Kumar	DMK	25 July 2001	24 July 2007	1	Resigned on 31 May 2006
B. S. Gnanadesikan	INC	25 July 2001	24 July 2007	1	Retirement
Ka. Ra. Subbian	DMK	14 January 2000	2 April 2002	1	Retirement
Tiruchi Siva	DMK	14 January 2000	2 April 2002	1	Retirement
S. Viduthalai Virumbi	DMK	30 June 1998	29 June 2004	3	Retirement
M. A. Kadar	DMK	30 June 1998	29 June 2004	1	Retirement
M. Sankaralingam	DMK	30 June 1998	29 June 2004	1	Retirement
S. Agniraj	DMK	30 June 1998	29 June 2004	1	Resigned on 18 May 2001
S. Sivasubramanian	DMK	30 June 1998	29 June 2004	1	Retirement
G. K. Moopanar	TMC(M)	30 June 1998	29 June 2004	4	Died on 30 August 2001
Jayanthi Natarajan	TMC(M)	10 October 1997	24 July 2001	3	Retirement
S. Peter Alphonse	TMC(M)	10 October 1997	2 April 2002	2	Retirement
N. Abdul Khader	TMC(M)	10 October 1997	29 June 1998	1	Retirement
V. P. Duraisamy	DMK	26 November 1996	24 July 2001	2	Retirement
N. Thalavai Sundaram	AIADMK	3 April 1996	2 April 2002	1	Resigned on 18 May 2001
P. Soundararajan	AIADMK	3 April 1996	2 April 2002	1	Retirement
R. K. Kumar	AIADMK	3 April 1996	2 April 2002	1	Died on 3 October 1999
S. Niraikulathan	AIADMK	3 April 1996	2 April 2002	1	Retirement
T. M. Venkatachalam	AIADMK	3 April 1996	2 April 2002	1	Died on 2 December 1999
S. Peter Alphonse	INC	3 April 1996	2 April 2002	1	Resigned on 9 September 1997
D. Masthan	AIADMK	25 July 1995	24 July 2001	1	Retirement
N. Rajendran	AIADMK	25 July 1995	24 July 2001	1	Retirement
O. S. Manian	AIADMK	25 July 1995	24 July 2001	1	Retirement
R. Margabandhu	AIADMK	25 July 1995	24 July 2001	1	Retirement
V. P. Duraisamy	AIADMK	25 July 1995	24 July 2001	1	Resigned on 10 October 1996
G. K. Moopanar	INC	25 July 1995	24 July 2001	3	Resigned on 9 September 1997
G. Swaminathan	AIADMK	30 June 1992	29 June 1998	2	Retirement
N. Thangaraj Pandian	AIADMK	30 June 1992	29 June 1998	1	Retirement
S. Austin	AIADMK	30 June 1992	29 June 1998	1	Retirement
S. Muthu Mani	AIADMK	30 June 1992	29 June 1998	1	Retirement
V. V. Rajan Chellappa	AIADMK	30 June 1992	29 June 1998	1	Retirement
Jayanthi Natarajan	INC	30 June 1992	29 June 1998	2	Resigned on 9 September 1997
S. Madhavan	AIADMK	3 April 1990	2 April 1996	1	Retirement
Vaiko	DMK	3 April 1990	2 April 1996	3	Retirement
Pasumpon Tha. Kiruttinan	DMK	3 April 1990	2 April 1996	2	Retirement
K. K. Veerappan	DMK	3 April 1990	2 April 1996	1	Retirement
Misa R. Ganesan	DMK	3 April 1990	2 April 1996	1	Retirement
T. A. Mohammed Saqhy	DMK	3 April 1990	2 April 1996	1	Retirement
A. Nallasivan	CPI(M)	25 July 1989	24 July 1995	1	Retirement
Murasoli Maran	DMK	25 July 1989	24 July 1995	3	Retirement
S. Viduthalai Virumbi	DMK	25 July 1989	24 July 1995	2	Retirement
J. S. Raju	DMK	25 July 1989	24 July 1995	1	Retirement
Tindivanam G. Venkatraman	DMK	25 July 1989	24 July 1995	1	Retirement
S. K. T. Ramachandran	INC	25 July 1989	24 July 1995	1	Retirement
Pasumpon Tha. Kiruttinan	DMK	15 March 1989	2 April 1990	1	Retirement
S. Viduthalai Virumbi	DMK	15 March 1989	24 July 1989	1	Retirement
G. Swaminathan	AIADMK	30 June 1986	29 June 1992	1	Retirement
M. Vincent	AIADMK	30 June 1986	29 June 1992	1	Retirement
R. T. Gopalan	AIADMK	30 June 1986	29 June 1992	1	Retirement
T. R. Baalu	DMK	30 June 1986	29 June 1992	1	Retirement
Jayanthi Natarajan	INC	30 June 1986	29 June 1992	1	Retirement
M. Palaniyandi	INC	30 June 1986	29 June 1992	1	Retirement
Valampuri John	AIADMK	3 April 1984	2 April 1990	2	Retirement
J. Jayalalithaa	AIADMK	3 April 1984	2 April 1990	1	Resigned on 28 January 1989
N. Rajangam	AIADMK	3 April 1984	2 April 1990	1	Retirement
V. Ramanathan	AIADMK	3 April 1984	2 April 1990	1	Retirement
Vaiko	DMK	3 April 1984	2 April 1990	2	Retirement
K. V. Thangkabalu	INC(I)	3 April 1984	2 April 1990	1	Retirement
M. Kadharsha	AIADMK	25 July 1983	24 July 1989	2	Retirement
Aladi Aruna	AIADMK	25 July 1983	24 July 1989	1	Retirement
Era. Sambasivam	AIADMK	25 July 1983	24 July 1989	1	Retirement
G. Varadaraj	AIADMK	25 July 1983	24 July 1989	1	Retirement
Murasoli Maran	DMK	25 July 1983	24 July 1989	2	Retirement
G. K. Moopanar	INC	25 July 1983	24 July 1989	2	Resigned on 2 February 1989
R. Mohanarangam	AIADMK	11 February 1983	10 February 1989	2	Retirement
P. Anbalagan	AIADMK	28 July 1980	2 April 1984	1	Retirement
D. Heerachand	AIADMK	30 June 1980	29 June 1986	1	Retirement
R. Mohanarangam	AIADMK	30 June 1980	29 June 1986	1	Disqualified on 8 September 1982
R. Ramakrishnan	AIADMK	30 June 1980	29 June 1986	1	Retirement
M. Kalyanasundaram	CPI	30 June 1980	29 June 1986	1	Retirement
L. Ganesan	DMK	30 June 1980	29 June 1986	1	Resigned on 10 April 1986
M. S. Ramachandran	INC(I)	30 June 1980	29 June 1986	1	Retirement
V. V. Swaminathan	AIADMK	3 April 1978	2 April 1984	2	Resigned on 19 June 1980
Sathiavani Muthu	AIADMK	3 April 1978	2 April 1984	1	Retirement
V. Venka	DMK	3 April 1978	2 April 1984	1	Retirement
Vaiko	DMK	3 April 1978	2 April 1984	1	Retirement
M. Moses	INC(I)	3 April 1978	2 April 1984	1	Retirement
Era. Sezhiyan	JP	3 April 1978	2 April 1984	1	Retirement
A. P. Janardhanam	AIADMK	25 July 1977	24 July 1983	1	Retirement
Noorjehan Razack	AIADMK	25 July 1977	24 July 1983	1	Retirement
U. R. Krishnan	AIADMK	25 July 1977	24 July 1983	1	Retirement
P. Ramamurthi	CPI(M)	25 July 1977	24 July 1983	2	Retirement
Murasoli Maran	DMK	25 July 1977	24 July 1983	1	Retirement
G. K. Moopanar	INC(I)	25 July 1977	24 July 1983	1	Retirement
E. R. Krishnan	AIADMK	18 July 1977	2 April 1980	1	Retirement
C. D. Natarajan	DMK	3 April 1974	2 April 1980	1	Retirement
G. Lakshmanan	DMK	3 April 1974	2 April 1980	1	Elected to LS on 8 January 1980
M. Kadharsha	DMK	3 April 1974	2 April 1980	1	Retirement
Valampuri John	INC	3 April 1974	2 April 1980	1	Disqualified on 14 October 1974
S. Ranganathan	IND	3 April 1974	2 April 1980	1	Retirement
S. A. Khaja Mohideen	IUML	3 April 1974	2 April 1980	2	Retirement
K. A. Krishnaswamy	AIADMK	3 April 1972	2 April 1978	1	Retirement
M. C. Balan	AIADMK	3 April 1972	2 April 1978	1	Retirement
M. S. Abdul Khader	AIADMK	3 April 1972	2 April 1978	1	Retirement
V. V. Swaminathan	AIADMK	3 April 1972	2 April 1978	1	Retirement
M. Kamalanathan	DMK	3 April 1972	2 April 1978	2	Retirement
A. K. Refaye	IUML	3 April 1972	2 April 1978	1	Retirement
M. Kamalanathan	DMK	29 July 1971	2 April 1972	1	Retirement
Kanchi Kalyanasundaram	DMK	3 April 1970	2 April 1976	2	Retirement
S. S. Mariswamy	DMK	3 April 1970	2 April 1976	2	Retirement
S. S. Rajendran	DMK	3 April 1970	2 April 1976	1	Retirement
T. K. Srinivasan	DMK	3 April 1970	2 April 1976	1	Retirement
T. V. Anandan	INC(O)	3 April 1970	2 April 1976	2	Retirement
A. K. A. Abdul Samad	IUML	3 April 1970	2 April 1976	1	Retirement
Kanchi Kalyanasundaram	DMK	23 September 1969	2 April 1970	1	Retirement
M. R. Venkataraman	CPI(M)	3 April 1968	2 April 1974	1	Retirement
G. A. Appan	DMK	3 April 1968	2 April 1974	1	Retirement
Thillai Villalan	DMK	3 April 1968	2 April 1974	1	Retirement
S. A. Khaja Mohideen	IUML	3 April 1968	2 April 1974	1	Retirement
M. Ruthnaswamy	SP	3 April 1968	2 April 1974	2	Retirement
V. V. Ramaswamy	DMK	20 March 1967	2 April 1968	1	Retirement
G. P. Somasundaram	DMK	3 April 1966	2 April 1972	1	Died on 25 June 1971
N. R. M. Swamy	INC	3 April 1966	2 April 1972	1	Retirement
N. Ramakrishna	INC(O)	3 April 1966	2 April 1972	3	Retirement
T. Chengalvaroyan	INC(O)	3 April 1966	2 April 1972	2	Retirement
R. T. Parthasarathy	INC(O)	3 April 1966	2 April 1972	1	Retirement
K. Sundaram	SP	3 April 1966	2 April 1972	1	Retirement
G. Lalitha Rajagopalan	INC	13 January 1965	2 April 1970	1	Retirement
P. Thanulingam	INC	9 July 1964	2 April 1968	1	Retirement
S. S. Mariswamy	DMK	3 April 1964	2 April 1970	1	Retirement
G. Rajagopalan	INC	3 April 1964	2 April 1970	3	Died on 16 November 1964
S. Chandrasekhar	INC	3 April 1964	2 April 1970	1	Retirement
S. S. Vasan	INC	3 April 1964	2 April 1970	1	Died on 28 August 1969
T. V. Anandan	INC(O)	3 April 1964	2 April 1970	1	Retirement
A. K. A. Abdul Samad	IUML	3 April 1964	2 April 1970	1	Retirement
T. Chengalvaroyan	INC	9 August 1963	2 April 1966	1	Retirement
K. Santhanam	INC	17 April 1962	2 April 1964	2	Retirement
C. N. Annadurai	DMK	3 April 1962	2 April 1968	1	Elected to LS on 25 February 1967
J. Sivashanmugam	INC	3 April 1962	2 April 1968	1	Retirement
M. A. Manickavelu	INC	3 April 1962	2 April 1968	1	Resigned on 15 April 1964
M. J. Jamal Mohideen	INC	3 April 1962	2 April 1968	1	Retirement
M. Ruthnaswamy	SP	3 April 1962	2 April 1968	1	Retirement
K. Santhanam	INC	18 April 1960	2 April 1962	1	Retirement
P. Ramamurthi	CPI	3 April 1960	2 April 1966	1	Retirement
T. S. Pattabiraman	INC	3 April 1960	2 April 1966	3	Retirement
N. Ramakrishna	INC	3 April 1960	2 April 1966	2	Retirement
G. Parthasarathy	INC	3 April 1960	2 April 1966	1	Retirement
N. M. Anwar	INC	3 April 1960	2 April 1966	1	Retirement
Thomas Srinivasan	INC	3 April 1960	2 April 1966	1	Died on 17 April 1963
R. Gopalakrishnan	INC	12 March 1960	2 April 1964	1	Retirement
G. Rajagopalan	INC	3 April 1958	2 April 1964	2	Retirement
S. Chattanatha	INC	3 April 1958	2 April 1964	2	Retirement
Abdul Rahim	INC	3 April 1958	2 April 1962	1	Retirement
B. Parameswaran	INC	3 April 1958	2 April 1964	1	Resigned on 12 March 1962
N. M. Lingam	INC	3 April 1958	2 April 1964	1	Retirement
T. S. Avinashilingam	INC	3 April 1958	2 April 1964	1	Retirement
H. D. Rajah	RPI	3 April 1958	2 April 1954	2	Died on 30 November 1959
Ammu Swaminathan	INC	9 November 1957	2 April 1960	1	Retirement
N. Ramakrishna	INC	22 April 1957	2 April 1960	1	Retirement
T. S. Pattabiraman	INC	20 April 1957	2 April 1960	2	Retirement
Dawood Ali Mirza	INC	11 December 1956	2 April 1962	1	Retirement
S. Venkataraman	INC	3 April 1956	2 April 1962	2	Retirement
V. K. Krishna Menon	INC	3 April 1956	2 April 1962	2	Elected to LS on 15 March 1957
V. M. Obaidullah	INC	3 April 1956	2 April 1962	2	Died on 21 February 1958
T. Nallamuthu Ramamurti	INC	3 April 1956	2 April 1962	1	Retirement
A. Ramaswami	SILF	3 April 1956	2 April 1962	2	Retirement
Parvathi Krishnan	CPI	3 April 1954	2 April 1960	1	Elected to LS on 12 March 1957
K. S. Hegde	INC	3 April 1954	2 April 1960	2	Resigned on 21 August 1957
P. S. Rajagopal Naidu	INC	3 April 1954	2 April 1960	2	Retirement
T. V. Kamalaswamy	INC	3 April 1954	2 April 1960	2	Retirement
P. Subbarayan	INC	3 April 1954	2 April 1960	1	Elected to LS on 4 March 1957
V. K. Krishna Menon	INC	26 May 1953	2 April 1956	1	Retirement
T. Bhaskara Rao	IND	3 April 1952	2 April 1960	1	Retirement
G. Rajagopalan	INC	3 April 1952	2 April 1958	1	Retirement
S. Chattanatha	INC	3 April 1952	2 April 1958	1	Retirement
V. M. Surendra Ram	INC	3 April 1952	2 April 1958	1	Retirement
M. Muhammad Ismail	IUML	3 April 1952	2 April 1958	1	Retirement
Pydah Venkatanarayana	PSP	3 April 1952	2 April 1958	1	Retirement
H. D. Rajah	RPI	3 April 1952	2 April 1958	1	Retirement
P. Sundarayya	CPI	3 April 1952	2 April 1956	1	Resigned on 21 March 1955
Mona Hensman	INC	3 April 1952	2 April 1956	1	Retirement
N. Gopalaswami	INC	3 April 1952	2 April 1956	1	Died on 10 February 1953
S. Sambhu Prasad	INC	3 April 1952	2 April 1956	1	Retirement
S. Venkataraman	INC	3 April 1952	2 April 1956	1	Retirement
T. S. Pattabiraman	INC	3 April 1952	2 April 1956	1	Retirement
V. M. Obaidullah	INC	3 April 1952	2 April 1956	1	Retirement
A. Ramaswami	SILF	3 April 1952	2 April 1956	1	Retirement
B. V. Kakkilaya	CPI	3 April 1952	2 April 1954	1	Retirement
E. K. Imbichibava	CPI	3 April 1952	2 April 1954	1	Retirement
K. Muhammad Rahmath	INC	3 April 1952	2 April 1954	1	Retirement
K. S. Hegde	INC	3 April 1952	2 April 1954	1	Retirement
Kotamraju Rama Rao	INC	3 April 1952	2 April 1954	1	Retirement
P. S. Rajagopal Naidu	INC	3 April 1952	2 April 1954	1	Retirement
Pattabhi Sitaramayya	INC	3 April 1952	2 April 1954	1	Died on 2 July 1952
T. V. Kamalaswamy	INC	3 April 1952	2 April 1954	1	Retirement

== Nominated members ==
Name	Political party	Date of		Total Term	Vacation Date/Reason
Name	Political party	Appointment	Retirement	Total Term	Vacation Date/Reason
Ilaiyaraaja	Non-partisan	7 July 2022	6 July 2028	1	Incumbent
Subramanian Swamy	BJP	25 April 2016	24 April 2022	1	Retirement
K. Parasaran	Non-partisan	29 June 2012	28 June 2018	1	Retirement
Rekha	Non-partisan	27 April 2012	26 April 2018	1	Retirement
Mani Shankar	INC	22 March 2010	21 March 2016	1	Retirement
C. Rangarajan	Non-partisan	9 August 2008	23 June 2010	1	Resigned on 10 August 2009
M. S. Swaminathan	Non-partisan	10 April 2007	9 April 2013	1	Retirement
Cho S. Ramaswamy	Non-partisan	22 November 1999	21 November 2005	1	Retirement
M. Aram	INC	27 August 1993	26 August 1999	1	Died on 24 May 1997
Vyjayantimala	INC	27 August 1993	26 August 1999	1	Retirement
R. K. Narayan	Non-partisan	12 May 1986	11 May 1992	1	Retirement
Tindivanam K. Ramamurthy	INC	9 May 1984	8 May 1990	1	Retirement
Maragatham Chandrasekar	INC(I)	18 February 1982	2 April 1988	3	Elected to LS on 29 December 1984
Sivaji Ganesan	INC(I)	18 February 1982	2 April 1986	1	Retirement
Malcolm Sathiyanathan Adiseshiah	Non-partisan	14 April 1978	13 April 1984	1	Retirement
Maragatham Chandrasekar	INC(I)	4 March 1976	4 February 1982	2	Retirement
Maragatham Chandrasekar	INC	4 March 1970	4 February 1976	1	Retirement
K. Ramiah	Non-partisan	3 April 1968	2 April 1974	1	Retirement
V. T. Krishnamachari	Non-partisan	9 June 1961	8 June 1967	1	Died on 13 February 1964
Rukmini Devi Arundale	Non-partisan	3 April 1956	2 April 1962	2	Retirement
Rukmini Devi Arundale	Non-partisan	3 April 1952	2 April 1956	1	Retirement
Jagadisan Mohandas Kumarappa	Non-partisan	3 April 1952	2 April 1954	1	Retirement

== See also ==
- List of current members of the Rajya Sabha
- List of nominated members of the Rajya Sabha
