= Phulo Devi Netam =

Indian politician (born 1972)

Member of Panel of Vice Chairpersons (Rajya Sabha)
- Incumbent
- Assumed office 15 April 2026 Serving with Dinesh Sharma, Ghanshyam Tiwari, Phangnon Konyak, Sasmit Patra, M. Thambidurai, Sasmit Patra
- Preceded by: Rajani Patil

Member of Parliament, Rajya Sabha
- Incumbent
- Assumed office 14 September 2020
- Preceded by: Motilal Vora
- Constituency: Chhattisgarh

Personal details
- Born: Phulo Devi Korram; 10 January 1972 (age 54) Naya Aalor, Chhatisgarh, India
- Party: Indian National Congress
- Spouse: Tulsidas Netam (m. 1991)
- Children: 2
- Parents: Aaytu Ram Korram (father); Kaushaliya Korram (mother)
- Occupation: Agriculturist; politician

Phulo Devi Netam (born 10 January 1974) is an Indian politician. She was elected unopposed to the Rajya Sabha, the upper house of Indian Parliament from Chhattisgarh, as a member of the Indian National Congress on 14 September 2020.

On 25 May 2013, she was part of a convoy of Indian National Congress leaders that was targeted in the 2013 Naxal attack in Darbha valley while returning from a meeting organised by the party in Sukma. Over two dozen people including senior Congress leaders were killed. Phulo Devi survived the attack.

== Positions Held ==
Period	Position Held
1994 – 1998	President, District Panchayat, Farasgaon
1998 – Nov. 2003	Member, Chhattisgarh Legislative Assembly
2001 – 2003	Chairperson, Committee on the Welfare of Women and Children
2005 – 2010	President, District Panchayat, Bastar, Jagdalpur
April 2020	Elected to Rajya Sabha
July 2020 – June 2024	Member, Committee on Railways
Sept. 2022 – June 2024	Member, Consultative Committee for the Ministry of Food Processing Industries
Jan. 2023 – Oct. 2024	Member, Committee on Members of Parliament Local Area Development Scheme
May 2023 – April 2024 and Aug. 2024 onwards	Member, Committee on the Welfare of Scheduled Castes and Scheduled Tribes
March – July 2023	Member, Joint Committee on the Forest (Conservation) Amendment Bill, 2023
Sept. 2024 onwards	Member, Committee on Social Justice and Empowerment
Oct. 2024 onwards	Member, Consultative Committee for the Ministry of Tribal Affairs
Feb. 2026 onwards	Member, India - Chile Parliamentary Friendship Group
April 2026	Re-elected to Rajya Sabha (second term)
April 2026	Nominated to the Panel of Vice-Persons

Other Information :

- President, District Co-operative Central Bank, District-Bastar, Jagdalpur, 2002;
- Member, (i) Chhattisgarh Board of Secondary Education, Raipur, Chhattisgarh, 2001 and
- (ii) Advisory Committee of Bharat Sanchar Nigam Limited, District Bastar, 2002
