= 1989 Rajya Sabha elections =

Elections for the Upper House of Indian Parliament

(of 228 seats) to the Rajya Sabha
	First party
Leader	P. Shiv Shankar
Party	INC

Rajya Sabha elections were held on various dates in 1989, to elect members of the Rajya Sabha, Indian Parliament's upper chamber.

== Elections ==
Elections were held to elect members from various states.

=== Members elected ===
The following members are elected in the elections held in 1989. They are members for the term 1989-1995 and retire in year 1995, except in case of the resignation or death before the term. The list is incomplete.

State - Member - Party

Rajya Sabha members for term 1989-1995
State	Member Name	Party	Remark
Assam	Amritlal Basumatary	OTH	Disq 01/08/1991
Assam	David Ledger	AGP	
Nominated	Mohammad Yunus	NOM	
Tamil Nadu	Murasoli Maran	DMK	
Tamil Nadu	J.S. Raju	DMK	
Tamil Nadu	S.K.T. Ramachandran	INC	
Tamil Nadu	Tindivanam G. Venkatraman	DMK	
Tamil Nadu	Viduthalai Virumbi	DMK	
Tamil Nadu	A Nallasivan	CPM	

== Bye-elections ==
The following bye elections were held in the year 1989.

State - Member - Party

1. Madhya Pradesh - Azam Ghufran - INC ( ele 16/06/1989 term till 1994 )
2. Tamil Nadu - Viduthalai Virumbi - DMK ( ele 15/03/1989 term till 1989 )
3. Tamil Nadu - P T Kiruttinan - DMK ( ele 15/03/1989 term till 1990 )
4. West Bengal - Ratna Bahadur Rai - CPM ( ele 23/03/1989 term till 1990 )
5. Nagaland - Khyomo Lotha - INC ( ele 08/06/1989 term till 1992 )
6. Uttar Pradesh - Ram Naresh Yadav - INC ( ele 20/06/1989 term till 1994 )
7. Uttar Pradesh - Mohan Singh - INC ( ele 01/08/1989 term till 1990 )
8. Andhra Pradesh - Mentay Padmanabham - TDP ( ele 13/09/1989 term till 1994 )
9. Bihar - Shamim Hashmi - INC ( ele 25/09/1989 term till 1994 )
10. Jammu and Kashmir - Shabir Ahmed Salaria - JKNC ( ele 25/09/1989 term till 1992 )
11. Uttar Pradesh - Alia Kumari - INC ( ele 11/10/1989 term till 1992 )
