= N. Abdul Khader =

Indian politician

Member of the Rajya Sabha
- In office 10 October 1997 – 29 July 1998
- Preceded by: Valampuri John
- Constituency: Tamil Nadu

Personal details
- Born: 1932
- Died: 2021 (aged 88–89)
- Party: Tamil Maanila Congress

N. Abdul Khader (1932–2021) was an Indian politician who was Member of the Rajya Sabha from Tamil Nadu representing Tamil Maanila Congress from 10 October 1997 to 29 July 1998. He won in by-election held after disqualification of Valampuri John.
