= Paththini (disambiguation) =

Paththini is a guardian deity of Sri Lanka.

Paththini may also refer to:

- Paththini (1997 film), 1997 Tamil film
- Paththini (2016 film), 2016 Sinhala film
