= Rajani Ashokrao Patil =

Indian politician (born 1958)

Member of Parliament, Rajya Sabha
- In office 27 September 2021 – 2 April 2026
- Chairman: Venkaiah Naidu; Jagdeep Dhankhar; C. P. Radhakrishnan
- Preceded by: Rajeev Satav
- Succeeded by: Maya Ivnate
- Constituency: Maharashtra
- In office 10 January 2013 – 2 April 2018
- Chairman: Mohammad Hamid Ansari; Venkaiah Naidu
- Preceded by: Vilasrao Deshmukh
- Constituency: Maharashtra

AICC Incharge for Himachal Pradesh Congress Committee and Chandigarh Territorial Congress Committee
- Incumbent
- Assumed office 14 February 2025
- Preceded by: Rajiv Shukla

Member of Parliament, Lok Sabha
- In office 1996–1998
- Preceded by: Kesharbai Kshirsagar
- Succeeded by: Jaisingrao Gaikwad Patil
- Constituency: Beed, Maharashtra

Member of Panel of Vice Chairpersons (Rajya Sabha)
- In office 2024–2026 Serving with Dinesh Sharma (politician), Bhubaneswar Kalita, S. Phangnon Konyak, Tiruchi Siva, Sasmit Patra, M. Thambidurai, Sasmit Patra
- Succeeded by: Phulo Devi Netam

Personal details
- Born: Rajani Atmarambapu Patil; 5 December 1958 (age 67) Pune, Maharashtra, India
- Party: Indian National Congress
- Spouse: Ashokrao Patil (m. 1982)
- Profession: Politician

Rajani Ashokrao Patil (born 5 December 1958) is an Indian politician from the Indian National Congress. She is the All India Congress Committee In-charge for Jammu & Kashmir. She was a Member of Parliament, representing Maharashtra in the Rajya Sabha, the upper house of Indian Parliament. She was awarded the Best debut Parliamentarian award for her performance in the Rajya Sabha. She was earlier elected to the Lok Sabha from Beed in the 11th Lok Sabha. In 2005, she was elected as the Chairperson of the Central Social Welfare Board. She represented India at the 49th session of the UN Commission on the status of women at the UN headquarters in New York. She was a student political leader in college in the National Students Union of India (NSUI). She started her career in electoral politics by getting elected to the Zilla Parishad unopposed in 1992. His father name is Atamarao Patil from sangli sangli borgaon.

== Early life and education ==
Rajani Ashokrao Patil was born on December 5, 1958, in Maharashtra, India. She grew up with a deep interest in politics and social issues, particularly women's rights. She was an active member of the National Students Union of India (NSUI) during her college years, which laid the foundation for her future political career.

== Political career ==
Rajani Patil is a senior member of the Indian National Congress (INC) party. Her political journey began in the 1990s when she was elected to the 11th Lok Sabha (1991–1996) from the Beed constituency in Maharashtra. She continued her political journey by becoming a member of the Rajya Sabha, the upper house of the Indian Parliament.

Over the years, Patil has been a key figure in the INC, particularly in her advocacy for women's rights and social justice. She was awarded the Best Debut Parliamentarian award for her early work in the Rajya Sabha.

== Public service and leadership roles ==
Rajani Patil has held several prominent leadership positions. Notably, she served as the Chairperson of the Central Social Welfare Board in 2005, where she worked to advance women's welfare programs. Additionally, she represented India at the United Nations 49th session on the Status of Women, reflecting her influence on national and global platforms regarding gender equality.

Her work as a leader also extended to the Congress party, where she was appointed In-charge for Jammu & Kashmir. She has consistently advocated for social welfare, and her contributions have made her an influential figure in Indian politics.

== Controversies and suspension ==
In February 2023, Rajani Patil was suspended from the Rajya Sabha for allegedly violating procedural rules. It was reported that she had recorded and shared footage of House proceedings on social media, which is against the Rajya Sabha's norms. However, after an inquiry and a recommendation from the Committee of Privileges, her suspension was revoked in August 2023.

== Legacy and influence ==
Rajani Patil's legacy in Indian politics is marked by her active participation in issues concerning women's empowerment, her leadership in the Congress party, and her service to her Kaij constituency. Her efforts to address social inequalities and contribute to national policymaking continue to influence Indian politics.

== See also ==
- Indian National Congress
- Sonia Gandhi
- Rahul Gandhi
- Kaij Assembly constituency
