= P. Wilson =

Member of Parliament, Rajya Sabha & Senior advocate of India

Pushpanathan Wilson

Member of Parliament, Rajya Sabha
- Incumbent
- Assumed office 25 July 2019
- Preceded by: Kanimozhi, DMK
- Constituency: List of Rajya Sabha members from Tamil Nadu

Additional Solicitor General of India
- In office 29 August 2012 - May 2014

Personal details
- Born: 6 June 1966 (age 60) Madras, Madras State (now Chennai, Tamil Nadu), India
- Party: Dravida Munnetra Kazhagam
- Education: Loyola College, Chennai, Madras Law College

Pushpanathan Wilson (born 6 June 1966) is a Senior Advocate in India, who served as the Additional Solicitor General of India between August 2012 and May 2014, and the Additional Advocate General of the State of Tamil Nadu between August 2008 and May 2011.

He is a member of the Rajya Sabha, the upper house of the Parliament of India, representing Tamil Nadu for the Dravida Munnetra Kazhagam (DMK). He was the DMK lawyer in the case for securing burial space on Marina Beach for M Karunanidhi.

== Background and education ==
Wilson was born in Madras (now Chennai), Tamil Nadu and completed his schooling at Asan Memorial Higher Secondary School. He obtained a bachelor's degree in Science from Loyola College, Chennai and completed his Bachelor of Laws from Madras Law College. He was enrolled as an advocate with the Bar Council of Tamil Nadu in 1989.

== Early career ==
Wilson joined the law firm of Shri K.V. Venkatapathi, a former Advocate General of Tamil Nadu, after his enrollment. He set up his individual practice in the civil side before the Madras High Court. He was appointed as the Standing Counsel for the Corporation of Chennai in 1996 and the Tamil Nadu Civil Supplies Corporation in 1998. He was also made Standing Counsel for the Tamil Nadu State Transport Corporation in 1998. In 2002 he was appointed as Additional Central Government Standing Counsel, serving in this post for about three years.

Wilson was appointed as the Senior Central Government Standing Counsel in the Madras High Court in 2005. He was subsequently appointed as the Special Government Pleader (Writs) by the Government of Tamil Nadu in June 2006. Two months later, in August 2006, he was appointed as the Assistant Solicitor General at Madras High Court.

In August 2008, the Government of Tamil Nadu appointed Wilson to the post of the Additional Advocate General of Tamil Nadu, from which he resigned in May 2011 along with the other law officers in the State.

Wilson was designated as a Senior Advocate by the Madras High Court in November 2009 at the age of 43. He has appeared in important Constitutional matters and other matters in the civil and commercial sides before the Madras High Court.

== Additional Solicitor General of India ==
Wilson was appointed as the Additional Solicitor General (South India) in August 2012 by the Government of India, for the High Courts of Madras, Kerala, Karnataka and Andhra Pradesh and their benches, the youngest person to ever occupy the position. Wilson resigned as ASGI (South India) in May 2014 after the change in the Union Government.

== Election to Rajya Sabha ==
Wilson was nominated to stand in the 2019 elections in Tamil Nadu for the Rajya Sabha (Upper House), for the Dravida Munnetra Kazhagam (DMK) Party, selected by party president M.K. Stalin. He was elected unopposed on 11 September 2019, and took his oath in the Rajya Sabha on 25 July 2019

== Positions held ==
Year/Period	Position / Role	Organization / Committee / Department
Aug. 2025 onwards	Member	Committee on Rural Development & Panchayati Raj
July 2025	Re-elected to Rajya Sabha	(Second term)
Feb. 2025	Nominated to the Panel of Vice-Chairpersons	Rajya Sabha (renominated in March 2025 and July 2025)
Dec. 2024 - July 2025	Member	Joint Committee on the Constitution (One Hundred and Twenty–Ninth Amendment) Bill, 2024 and the Union Territories Laws (Amendment) Bill, 2024
Oct. 2024 onwards	Member	Consultative Committee for the Ministry of Power
Jan. 2023 - Oct. 2024	Member	Committee on Members of Parliament Local Area Development Scheme
March 2022 - June 2024	Member	Consultative Committee for the Ministry of Women and Child Development
Oct. 2019 - March 2022	Member	Consultative Committee for the Ministry of Defence
Oct. 2019 - Nov. 2022; Nov. 2024 - July 2025	Member	Committee of Privileges
Sept. 2019 - June 2024; Sept. 2024 - July 2025	Member	Committee on Personnel, Public Grievances, Law and Justice
July 2019	Elected to Rajya Sabha	(First term)
2012	Additional Solicitor General (South India)	High Courts of Madras and its Bench at: Madurai; Andhra Pradesh (United); Kerala; Karnataka and its benches
2009	Designated Senior Advocate	Madras High Court
2008	Additional Advocate General	Government of Tamil Nadu, Madras High Court
2008	Assistant Solicitor General of India	Madras High Court
2006	Special Government Pleader (Writs)	Government of Tamil Nadu
2006	Special Prosecutor	Central Bureau of Investigation
2005	Senior Central Government Standing Counsel	Madras High Court
2002	Additional Central Government Standing Counsel	
1998	Standing Counsel	Tamil Nadu State Transport Corporation, Madras High Court; Standing Counsel, Civil Supplies Corporation
1996	Standing Counsel	Corporation of Chennai, Madras High Court
