= Dawood Ali Mirza =

Dawood Ali Mirza (23 December 1907—21 August 1986) was an Indian politician who was Member of the Rajya Sabha from Tamil Nadu. He was elected on 11 December 1956 and was Member till 2 April 1962. He was Member of the Indian National Congress.
