= N. M. Anwar =

Indian politician

Member of the Rajya Sabha
- In office 1960–1966
- Constituency: Tamil Nadu

Personal details
- Party: All India Muslim Majlis-e-Mushawarat
- Other political affiliations: Indian National Congress

N. M. Anwar was an Indian politician. He was Member of Rajya Sabha from Tamil Nadu. He served from 1960 to 1966 representing the Indian National Congress.

He was General secretary of All India Muslim Majlis-e-Mushawwarat.
