= S. Venkataraman =

Indian politician

Member of Parliament, Rajya Sabha
- In office 3 April 1952 – 2 April 1962
- Preceded by: Office established
- Constituency: Madras

Personal details
- Born: 8 January 1903
- Died: 17 November 1980 (aged 77)
- Party: Indian National Congress

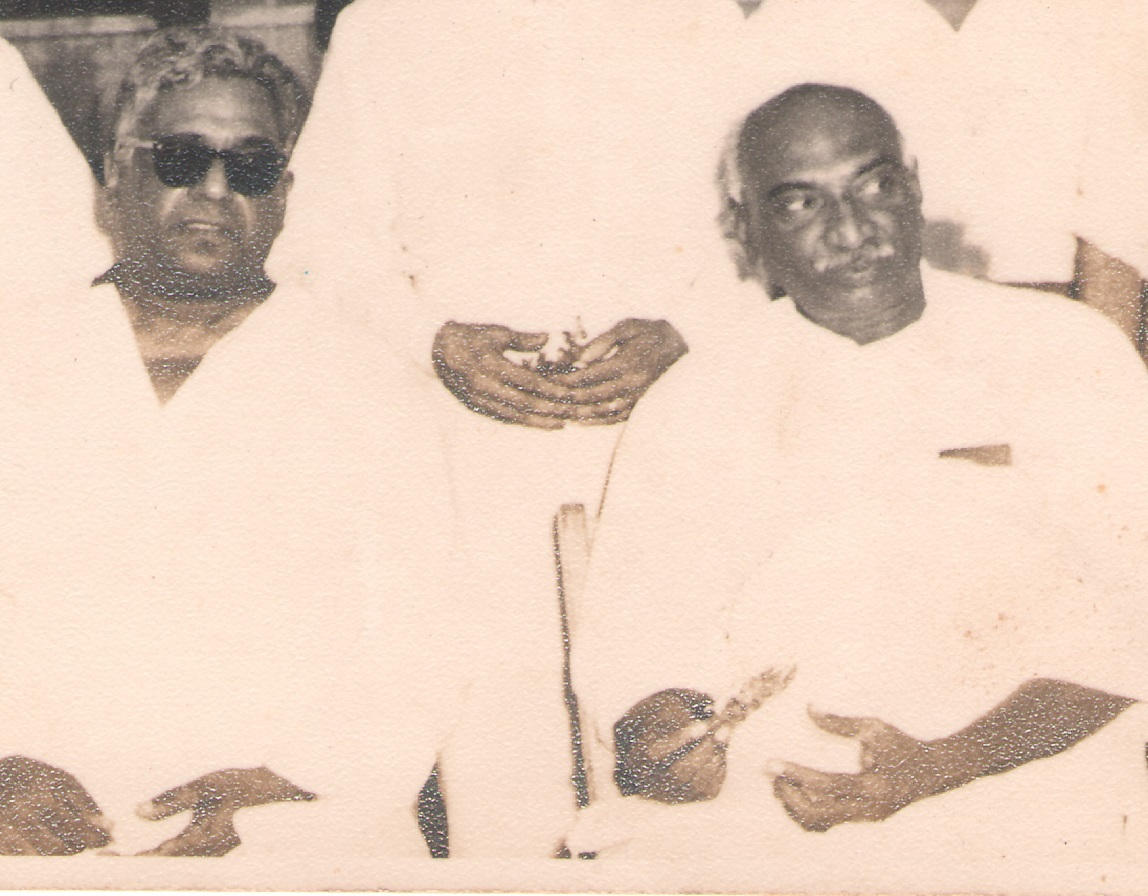
Shri. S. Venkataraman, Rajya Sabha MP (left) with Shri K. Kamraj (Chief Minister of Madras State)- Both were INC (Indian National Congress) circa 1961

S. Venkataraman (8 January 1903 – 17 November 1980) was an Indian politician who served for two terms as a Rajya Sabha Member from 1952 to 1962 (3 April 1952 to 2 April 1956 and 3 April 1956 to 2 April 1962). He was a member of the Indian National Congress and also served as the Secretary of the Tamil Nadu Congress Committee (TNCC) from 1946 to 1952. He participated in the Vedaranyam March. He was a son of Subramina Iyer (father) and Madhurambal (mother). He was the editor of Jaya Bharati, a Tamil Daily in the late 1930s which was a leading publication during the Civil Disobedience Movement which led to his imprisonment by the British. He was imprisoned for a total of eight years (two prison terms) for his activities relating to the Indian Independence Movement. He was also one of the major supporters of the Madras Mahajana Sabha. He was a close ally of K. Kamaraj, Indian National Congress leader.
