= S. Muthukaruppan =

Indian politician

MP of Rajya Sabha for Tamil Nadu
- In office 3 April 2014 – 2 April 2020
- Constituency: Tamil Nadu

Personal details
- Political party: AIADMK

S._Muthukaruppan (born March 25, 1958, Vallanad, District- Tuticorin (Tamil Nadu)) is a politician. He is a Member of Parliament, representing Tamil Nadu in the Rajya Sabha (the upper house of India's Parliament).

He belongs to the Indian All India Anna Dravida Munnetra Kazhagam (ADMK) political party.

== See also ==
Rajya Sabha members from Tamil Nadu
