= R. Dharmar =

Indian politician

Member of Parliament, Rajya Sabha
- Incumbent
- Assumed office 30 June 2022
- Prime Minister: Narendra Modi
- Preceded by: A. Vijayakumar
- Constituency: Tamil Nadu

Personal details
- Party: All India Anna Dravida Munnetra Kazhagam

Ramasamy Dharmar is an Indian politician and advocate. He is a member of Parliament, representing Tamil Nadu in the Rajya Sabha, the upper house of Parliament of India.

From 2022-26, He continued supporting expelled leader O. Panneerselvam. On 24 January 2026, He extended his support to Admk General Secretary Edappadi K. Palaniswami and Joined back the party, ahead of 2026 Tamil Nadu Assembly Elections.

== Elections contested and positions held ==
=== Rajya Sabha elections ===
Elections	Constituency	Political party	Result
2022	Tamil Nadu	AIADMK	Won

=== Positions in Parliament of the Republic of India ===
Elections	Position	Elected constituency	Term in office		
Elections	Position	Elected constituency	Assumed office	Left office	Time in office
2022	Member of Parliament, Rajya Sabha	Tamil Nadu	30 June 2022	Incumbent	3 years, 285 days
