= S. Amir Ali Jinnah =

Indian politician

Member of Rajya Sabha
- In office 3 April 2008 – 2 April 2014
- President: Pranab Mukherjee
- Constituency: Tamil Nadu

Personal details
- Born: Mukhtar Ahmed Ansari; 1941 (age 84–85)
- Parent: S Mohammed Sulaiman

S. Amir Ali Jinnah (also known as A. A. Jinnah) is an Indian politician who served as a Member of the Rajya Sabha.

== Personal life ==
He was born in 1941. His father S Mohammed Sulaiman was a farmer.
