= H. D. Rajah =

Indian freedom fighter, businessman, and politician

Member of Parliament, Rajya Sabha
- In office 3 April 1952 – 2 April 1958
- In office 3 April 1958 – 30 November 1959

Personal details
- Born: June 1904
- Died: 30 November 1959 (aged 55)

H. D. Rajah (1904–1959) was an Indian freedom fighter, businessman, and politician, known for his contributions to the Indian independence movement.

== Early life ==
Rajah was born in June 1904 in Kayamkulam, Tirunelveli, to Harihara Iyer and Lakshmi. He was one of five children, and the family moved to Thiruvananthapuram to ensure their education. Rajah demonstrated academic excellence, receiving the King George V Coronation Medal during his school years, and matriculated in 1923. Inspired by freedom fighter Ramakrishna Pillai, he was drawn to the independence movement.

After relocating to Bombay in 1925, following his elder brother Ramayya, Rajah became actively involved in political activism. He also engaged in promoting Hindi but opposed imposing the language on others.

== Role in the Freedom Movement ==
- Youth Movement of Bombay (1924): Rajah joined this movement and founded the magazine The Youth Liberator, which gained popularity and was praised by Jawaharlal Nehru.
- Simon Commission Protests (1927): He led demonstrations against the commission’s lack of Indian representation.
- Salt Satyagraha (1930): Rajah participated in the campaign and created the People’s Battalion of Bombay, aiming to non-violently take over British government institutions. He was tried for sedition and sentenced to imprisonment at Yerawada Jail, where he interacted with Mahatma Gandhi, who helped secure his release in 1932. Exiled to Madras, he continued his activism.
- Madras Conspiracy Case (1932): Rajah was arrested for distributing seditious pamphlets and for alleged involvement in a plot against the governor of Bengal. He served another year in prison.
- Quit India Movement (1942): Rajah was again imprisoned for his participation in the nationwide call for independence.

== Post-Independence Contributions ==
Believing the Congress Party had served its purpose after achieving independence, Rajah established the Republican Party in 1950. He held the first convention at Gokhale Hall in Madras. Constitutional opposition was his theme, and he was the president of the party.

Rajah became a member of the Rajya Sabha in 1952 and was re-elected in 1958. Known as a bold and articulate speaker, he addressed issues like excise on sugar, food industry anomalies, budget policies, and India's five-year plans. His speeches often reflected his deep understanding of economic factors, supported by statistical analysis.

He was a strong critic of India's classification as an "underdeveloped" country, arguing it was more accurately "overexploited," with the common man burdened by high prices. Rajah also dismissed the concept of the "Commonwealth of Nations," highlighting its lack of shared wealth or significance for India. He encouraged Indian entrepreneurs to strive for self-reliance in both finance and administration.

== Business Ventures ==
Rajah transitioned to business in 1934, becoming involved in various ventures:

- Rane Madras Limited (1936): He served as its company secretary.
- Vanguard Insurance Company (1937): Founded on January 14, 1937 by Rajah, it became a prominent enterprise, later expanding to the Vanguard Fire and General Insurance Company in 1941.
- Nalin Publicity Bureau (1942): Rajah ventured into advertising, establishing one of the region's early advertising firms.

== Educational Initiatives ==
In 1957, Rajah founded the H.D. Rajah Educational Trust, which established the Lakshmi Harihara High School in Elathur, Tirunelveli.

== Legacy ==
Rajah died on November 30, 1959.
