= Dinesh Sharma (politician) =

Indian politician

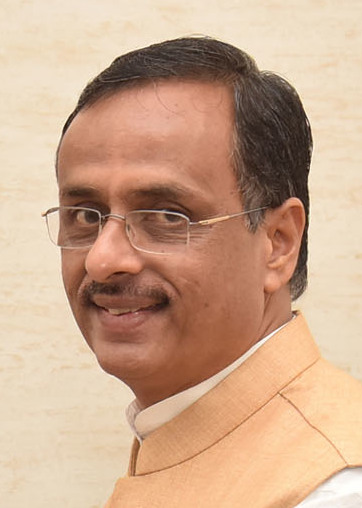
- Sharma in 2017

15th Lieutenant Governor of the Andaman and Nicobar Islands
- Incumbent
- Assumed office 15 September 2026
- President: Droupadi Murmu
- Preceded by: Devendra Kumar Joshi

5th Deputy Chief Minister of Uttar Pradesh
- In office 19 March 2017 – 25 March 2022 Serving with Keshav Prasad Maurya
- Chief Minister: Yogi Adityanath
- Preceded by: Ram Naresh Yadav
- Succeeded by: Brajesh Pathak

Minister of Secondary & Higher Education of Uttar Pradesh
- In office 19 March 2017 – 25 March 2022
- Chief Minister: Yogi Adityanath
- Succeeded by: Yogendra Upadhyaya

Minister of Science & Technology of Uttar Pradesh
- In office 19 March 2017 – 25 March 2022
- Chief Minister: Yogi Adityanath
- Succeeded by: Yogendra Upadhyaya

Minister of Electronics & Information Technology of Uttar Pradesh
- In office 19 March 2017 – 25 March 2022
- Chief Minister: Yogi Adityanath
- Succeeded by: Yogendra Upadhyaya

Leader of the House in Uttar Pradesh Legislative Council
- In office 11 May 2017 – 25 March 2022
- Preceded by: Ahmed Hassan
- Succeeded by: Swatantra Dev Singh

Member of Uttar Pradesh Legislative Council
- In office 9 September 2017 – 9 September 2023
- Preceded by: Ashok Bajpai
- Succeeded by: Dara Singh Chauhan
- Constituency: Elected by the MLAs

Mayor of Lucknow
- In office 14 November 2006 – 22 March 2017
- Preceded by: S. C. Rai
- Succeeded by: Suresh Awasthi

President of Bharatiya Janata Yuva Morcha, Uttar Pradesh
- In office 1993–1998

Member of Panel of Vice Chairpersons (Rajya Sabha)
- Incumbent
- Assumed office from Serving with Phangnon Konyak, Bhubaneswar Kalita, Tiruchi Siva, Rajani Ashokrao Patil, Sasmit Patra, M. Thambidurai, Sasmit Patra

Member of Parliament, Rajya Sabha
- In office 9 September 2023 – 11 September 2026
- Preceded by: Hardwar Dubey
- Constituency: Uttar Pradesh

Personal details
- Born: 12 January 1964 (age 62) Lucknow, Uttar Pradesh, India
- Party: Bharatiya Janata Party
- Spouse: Jayalakshmi Sharma (m. 2010)
- Education: Lucknow University (M.Com.), Ph.D.)
- Occupation: Academic

Dinesh Sharma (born 12 January 1964) is an Indian politician who is the 15th Lieutenant Governor of the Andaman and Nicobar Islands. He is a former Member of Parliament in the Rajya Sabha from Uttar Pradesh. He served as the Deputy Chief Minister of Uttar Pradesh from 2017 to 2022 and was previously the mayor of Lucknow. A professor by profession, he is a member of the Bharatiya Janata Party and has held various posts in the party over the years.

== Political career ==
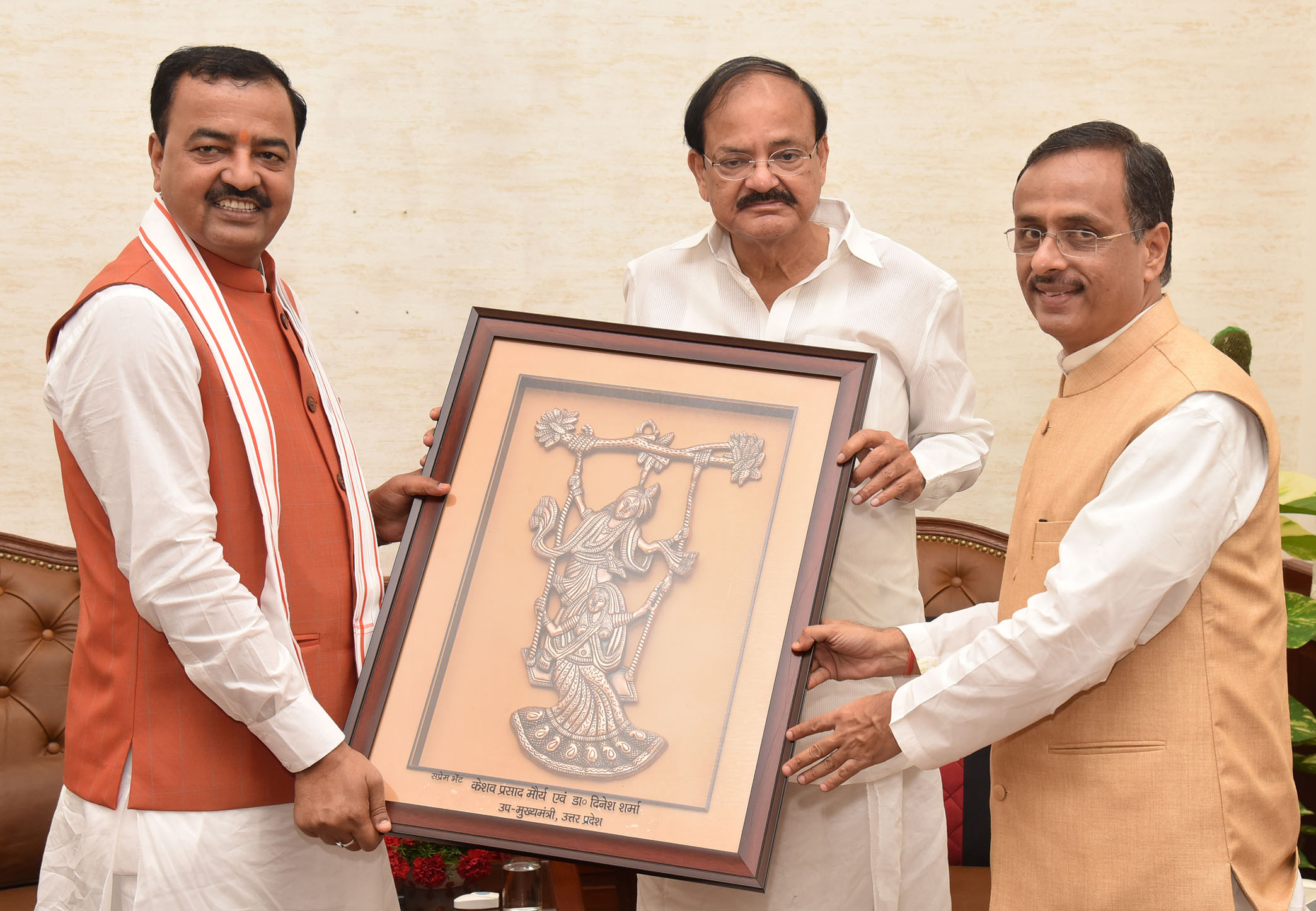
Sharma, in the right, with Keshav Prasad Maurya and Venkaiah Naidu in 2017.

Sharma's political talent was first noticed by former Prime Minister Atal Bihari Vajpayee. Like many politicians in the Bharatiya Janata Party, Sharma began his political career with the Akhil Bharatiya Vidyarthi Parishad, the student wing of the Rashtriya Swayamsevak Sangh. He was later named the state President of the BJP's Bharatiya Janata Yuva Morcha (Youth Wing). Sharma was subsequently elected as Mayor of Lucknow in 2006. He stood for re-election in 2012 and defeated his nearest rival, Neeraj Bora of the Indian National Congress by over 171,000 votes. On 16 August 2014 he became the National Vice-president of Bharatiya Janata Party, following his contribution to the party's success in the 2014 Lok Sabha elections. On 19 March 2017, he was appointed one of two Deputy Chief Ministers of Uttar Pradesh. He is not an elected member of the Uttar Pradesh Legislative Assembly. He was elected for Legislative Council (Upper House) on 9 September 2017.

He was allocated the ministries of Higher and Secondary Education, Science and Technology, Electronics and IT departments.

In March 2022, Sharma was replaced by Brajesh Pathak as the new Deputy Chief Minister of Uttar Pradesh.

Sharma was named as the BJP candidate for the by-election to a Rajya Sabha seat from Uttar Pradesh in 2023 which he won unopposed and became Member of Parliament.

== Academic career ==
Sharma joined the University of Lucknow in 1988. He was professor in the commerce department.
