= Constandine Ravindran =

Indian politician

Constandine J. Ravindran

Member of Parliament, Rajya Sabha
- Incumbent
- Assumed office 3 April 2026
- Constituency: Tamil Nadu

Personal details
- Party: Dravida Munnetra Kazhagam
- Other political affiliations: Desiya Murpokku Dravida Kazhagam

Constandine Ravindran is an Indian politician. He was elected to the Rajya Sabha, the upper house of Indian Parliament, from Tamil Nadu as a member of the Dravida Munnetra Kazhagam.

Prior to this, he contested the 2014 Lok Sabha election from the Chennai Central Lok Sabha constituency on behalf of DMDK as part of the NDA alliance and came third with 114,798 votes (14.48% share).

== Rajya Sabha ==
=== Committees held in Rajya Sabha ===
- Member, Committee on Information and Communication Technology Management in Rajya Sabha
- Member, Committee on Education, Women, Children, Youth and Sports
