= Paththini (1997 film) =

- Directed by: P. Vasu
- Written by: P. Vasu
- Produced by: V. MATHANAGOPAL
- Starring: Jayaram; Khushbu; Prakash Raj
- Cinematography: Ravinder
- Edited by: P. Mohanraj
- Music by: Deva
- Production company: Good Luck Films
- Release date: 26 September 1997
- Country: India
- Language: Tamil

Paththini is a 1997 Indian Tamil-language drama film, written and directed by P. Vasu. The film stars Jayaram and Khushbu, while Prakash Raj and Janagaraj portray supporting roles. It was released on 26 September 1997.

== Cast ==
- Jayaram
- Khushbu
- Prakash Raj
- Janagaraj
- Thyagu
- Charle

== Production ==
After making several unsuccessful films during the mid-1990s, P. Vasu made a comeback with Vaimaye Vellum (1997) and the good performance of the film, fetched him an opportunity from Good Luck Films to make Paththini, said to be loosely based on the Hollywood film, Sleeping with the Enemy (1991). The venture saw the team from the successful 1993 film Purusha Lakshanam collaborate again with the producers, director, actor and actress returning to make Paththini.

== Music ==
The soundtrack was composed by Deva.

Song	Singers	Lyrics	Duration
"Aalapuzha"	Mano, Sujatha	Kalidasan	04:32
"Anandham"	Mano	Vaali	05:11
"Mellathan Solla"	Swarnalatha	Piraisoodan	06:17
"O Thendrale"	K. S. Chithra	Valampuri John	05:23
"Sumaithangi"	K. S. Chithra	Kalidasan	06:30
"Sugamana Paattu"	K. J. Yesudas	Vaali	05:35

== Release and reception ==
Deccan Herald wrote "Pathini, if not for its connotations, is a film full of overworked themes. Not really worth seeing at all". Ji of Kalki wrote the director, who has tried to stand up due to series of failures, here he is at sitting level, until then its successful. Despite not performing well at the box office, the film won two Tamil Nadu State Film Awards — for Best Film portraying Women in Good Light and the Special Prize for Khushbu.
