= M. Kadharsha =

Indian politician

Mohammed Kadharsha

Member of Parliament (Rajya Sabha)
- In office 1974–1980
- Prime Minister: Indira Gandhi

Personal details
- Born: 6 October 1935
- Party: All India Anna Dravida Munnetra Kazhagam
- Spouse: Laila
- Profession: Politician

Mohammed Kadharsha (born 6 October 1935) is an Indian politician from the All India Anna Dravida Munnetra Kazhagam. He served as a member of the Rajya Sabha from 3 April 1974, to 2 April 1980, and 25 July 1983, to 24 July 1989.

== Family ==
Kadharsha was born on 6 October 1935, to K. Mohammed and has studied up to graduation. Kadharsha is married to Laila Kadharsha. The couple has two sons and two daughters.
