= V. M. Obaidullah =

Indian politician and independence leader (1905–1958)

V. M. Obaidullah Sahib

Member of Parliament, Rajya Sabha
- In office 3 April 1952 – 2 April 1956
- In office 3 April 1956 – 21 February 1958

Personal details
- Born: 2 May 1905 Vellore, Madras Presidency
- Died: 21 February 1958 (aged 52)
- Party: INC

V. M. Obaidullah Sahib (2 May 1905 – 21 February 1958) was an Indian political leader from Tamil Nadu known for his active participation in the Indian independence movement.

Born on 2 May 1905, in Vellore to Madhar Batcha Sahib and Rabiya Basri, he came from a middle-class merchant family involved in the betel-nut trade.

== Involvement in the Indian independence movement ==
In 1920, Obaidullah joined the Khilafat Movement to protest the UK's continued control of India and its post-World War I policy in Turkey. British colonial authorities imprisoned Obaidullah five times between 1923 and 1942, due to his activities on behalf of the Indian independence movement. He has been described as a disciple of Mahatma Gandhi regarding his belief in non-violent resistance against British rule in India.

Obaidullah served as a member of the upper house of the Indian parliament, Rajya Sabha from 1952 until his death in 1958. Key legislative initiatives he promoted include the reopening of the Jalakandeeswarar Temple in Vellore Fort for public worship, encouraging the use of the Gandhi Maidan near the Vellore Fort for public gatherings and irrigation projects drawing water from the Palar River.

== Leadership Roles ==
Obaidullah held several local and national leadership positions in India over the course of his career, prior to his election to the upper house of the Indian legislature. He was a city councillor for Vellore's municipal government for more than two decades. Obaidullah moreover served for four years as vice president of the North Arcot District Board (1938-1944), seven years as the vice president of the Tamil Nadu Congress Committee (TNCC), and two years as TNNC president (1940-1941). He also spent a decade as a member of the All India Congress Committee (AICC).

Between 1950 and 1951, Obaidullah was a member of the Ministry of Transport's Standing Committee. He served as a member of the Provincial Parliament between 1951 and 1952, before being elected to the Rajya Sabha. He served a full term in the upper house of parliament from 3 April 1952 to 2 April 1956. He was elected to the Rajya Sabha for a second term, of six years, in April 1956, but passed away less than two years into his term.

== Family and Legacy ==
Obaidullah was married to Zaibunisa Begum. He died on 21 February 1958, while serving as a Rajya Sabha member. In recognition of his contributions, Vellore's main bus stop was formerly renamed as the V.M. Obaidullah Bus Stand. An obituary in the Lok Sabha referred to him as a distinguished Tamil orator and a dedicated nationalist who endured significant hardships in the pursuit of India's independence. Immediately following his death, the Tamil Nadu state government offered his widow a plot of land as a form of compensation. Begum declined the gesture, maintaining that her late husband's public service was "beyond any reward or award".
