= R. S. Bharathi =

Indian politician

Aalanthur R.S.Bharathi

Member of Parliament Rajya Sabha
- In office 30 June 2016 – 29 June 2022
- Preceded by: K. P. Ramalingam
- Succeeded by: R. Girirajan
- Constituency: Tamil Nadu

Personal details
- Born: 15 August 1947 (age 77); Alandur
- Political party: Dravida Munnetra Kazhagam
- Parents: D.J. Raman (father); J. Vijayalakshmi (mother)

R. S. Bharathi is an Indian politician from the state of Tamil Nadu and belongs to the Dravida Munnetra Kazhagam. He is a lawyer by profession.

In June 2016, he was announced as the party's candidate for the Rajya Sabha biennial polls. On 3 June 2016 he was elected unopposed along with T. K. S. Elangovan.
