= Valampuri John =

Tamil writer, orator and former Rajya Sabha member of India (1946–2005)

Member of Parliament, Rajya Sabha
- In office 3 April 1974 – 2 April 1980
- Constituency: Tamil Nadu
- In office 3 April 1984 – 2 April 1990
- Constituency: Tamil Nadu

Personal details
- Born: D.C.John; October 14, 1946 Uvari,Tirunelveli District Madras Presidency, British India (now in Tirunelveli District, Tamil Nadu, India
- Died: 8 May 2005 (aged 59) Chennai, Tamil Nadu, India
- Party: DMK, AIADMK, INC, TMC (Moopanar)
- Spouse: Marybanu
- Children: 5
- Education: Master of Public Administration - St. Xavier's College, Palayamkottai, Master of Laws - Dr. Ambedkar Government Law College, Chennai, D.Litt,PhD - Pachaiyappa's College,.
- Occupation: Politician, Indian parliamentarian, Orator, Editor, Author.

Valampuri John (14 October 1946 – 08 May 2005) was a verstatile genius who was known as a Tamil writer, orator and former Rajya Sabha member of India.

== Politcal Career ==
Valampuri John started his career as a lawyer and activist of the Dravida Munnetra Kazhagam (DMK). Later, he joined the All-India Anna Dravida Munnetra Kazhagam (AIADMK). He also associated himself with the erstwhile Tamil Maanila Congress founded by the late G.K. Moopanar in 1996. He had authored several books on different subjects including literature, politics and Siddha medicine.

He was elected to Rajya Sabha in 1974 and 1984. He became a member of the then Legislative Council in 1983.

== Rajya Sabha Election History ==
Position	Party	Constituency	From	To	Tenure	Note
Member of Parliament, Rajya Sabha (1st Term)	INC	Tamil Nadu	3 April 1974	2 April 1980	5 years, 365 days	* Disqualified on 14 October 1974 on Age Criteria.
Member of Parliament, Rajya Sabha (2nd Term)	AIADMK	Tamil Nadu	3 April 1984	2 April 1990	6 years, 364 days	--

== Personal life ==
Valampuri John was born on 14 October 1946 to Devasagayam Fernando (Father) & Viyakulam (Mother) in Uvari village in Tirunelveli district.He had a elder brother Albert and a younger brother Mohan..He married Marybanu and had four daughters,one son (Prabhu).

Though he experienced many ups and downs throughout his life, he was has officially declared bankrupt by the Madras High Court after he failed to repay a Rs. 12.28 lakh debt owed to another person.

== Education ==
He did his primary schooling in his native Uvari and moved to St. Xavier's High School, Palayamkottai for his higher secrondary education. Completed his under graduate and Master of Public Administration in St. Xavier's College, Palayamkottai. He moved to chennai to pursue Master of Laws in Dr. Ambedkar Government Law College, Chennai (1972-1973).

In 1992 he completed his dissertation Prof.Ruthnaswamy - A Parliamentarian in Pachaiyappa's College for D.Litt and his PhD for Economic Empowerment.

== Film Career ==
Valampuri John also tried his hand in the film industry. Utilizing his writing talent, he had a few opportunities to write songs and dialogue for Tamil films.Songs associated with him include lyrics connected with films such as Varaprasadham(1976),Priyamudan Prabhu (1984), Poruthathu Pothum (1989), Gnana Paravai (1991),Paththini (1997).He was also dialogue writer for 1988 film Sudhanthira Naattin Adimaigal.Venturing into filmmaking with no prior experience, he took on the roles of director and producer for the 1988 movie Adhu Antha Kaalam. The film failed at the box office, leaving Valampuri John in financial trouble.

== Magazine career ==
Valampuri John worked as editor "Thaaii", a Tamil periodical, launched by the late Chief Minister, M. G. Ramachandran. He also wrote articles in several Newspaper & Magazines.

== Books ==
- Vanakkam - Talks about his working experience between MGR, Jayalalitha
- Nayagam Engal Thayagam - 1995.

== Death ==
Valampuri John died in a Private Hospital,Chennai on 08 May 2005, at the age of 59.

== Awards ==
- Kalaimamani Award - 1998.
- S. P. Adithanar Literary Award

== See also ==
- List of Rajya Sabha members from Tamil Nadu
