= T. V. Kamalaswamy =

Indian politician (1911–1998)

T. Visvanatha Pillai Kamalaswamy

Member of Parliament (Rajya Sabha)
- In office 1952–1954
- In office 1954–1960

Personal details
- Born: 21 January 1911 25 March 1998 (aged 87)
- Party: Indian National Congress
- Spouse: T. K. Saravanai Vadivoo Ammal
- Profession: Politician

T. Visvanatha Pillai Kamalaswamy (21 January 1911 – 25 March 1998) was an Indian politician from the Indian National Congress. He served as a member of the Rajya Sabha from Madras State (now Tamil Nadu) from 3 April 1952 to 2 April 1954 and 3 April 1954 to 2 April 1960.

== Family ==
Kamalaswamy was born to T. S. Visvanatha Pillai. He married T. K. Saravanai Vadivoo Ammal and had one son and one daughter.
