= Christopher Tilak =

Indian politician

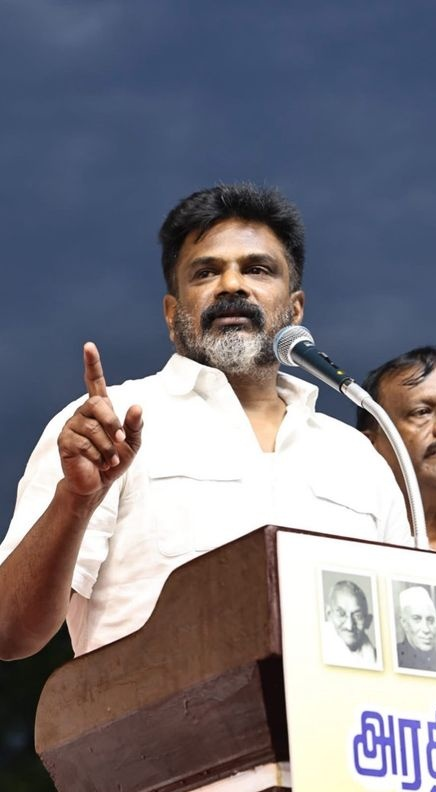
- Tilak speaking at a political meeting

Member of Parliament, Rajya Sabha
- Incumbent
- Assumed office 3 April 2026
- Preceded by: P. Selvarasu
- Constituency: Tamil Nadu

Personal details
- Party: Indian National Congress

Christopher Tilak is an Indian politician from Tamil Nadu. He was elected to the Rajya Sabha, the upper house of Indian Parliament, from Tamil Nadu as a member of the Indian National Congress.

== Early life ==
Tilak is a Dalit Christian from Dharapuram, Tirupur, Tamil Nadu. He did his schooling and college education in Madurai. He completed his BE and MBA at Madurai Thiagarajar College. He was former hockey player at the state level.

Tilak was nominated as a Congress candidate for Rajya Sabha in March 2026. He served as All India Congress Committee (AICC) in charge of Manipur, Nagaland, Tripura and Sikkim, and in the Congress Youth Wing. He was also the Tamil Nadu unit's member of the SC and ST wing.
