= M. Thambidurai =

Indian politician (born 1947)

M. Thambi Durai
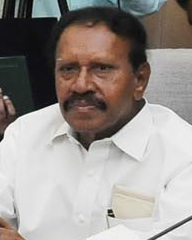

Member of Parliament, Rajya Sabha
- Incumbent
- Assumed office 3 April 2020
- Constituency: Tamil Nadu

Deputy Speaker of the Lok Sabha
- In office 13 August 2014 – 25 May 2019
- President: Pranab Mukherjee; Ram Nath Kovind
- Speaker: Sumitra Mahajan
- Leader of the House: Narendra Modi
- Preceded by: Kariya Munda
- Succeeded by: Vacant
- In office 22 January 1985 – 27 November 1989
- President: Giani Zail Singh; R. Venkataraman
- Speaker: Balram Jakhar
- Leader of the House: Rajiv Gandhi
- Preceded by: G. Lakshmanan
- Succeeded by: Shivraj Patil

Union Minister of Law, Justice & Corporate Affairs and Minister of State for Surface Transport
- In office 19 March 1998 – 8 April 1999
- Prime Minister: Atal Bihari Vajpayee
- Preceded by: Ramakant Khalap
- Succeeded by: Rangarajan Kumaramangalam

Member of Parliament, Lok Sabha
- In office 14 May 2009 – 22 May 2019
- Preceded by: K. C. Palanisamy
- Succeeded by: S. Jothimani
- Constituency: Karur, Tamil Nadu
- In office 10 March 1998 – 26 April 1999
- Preceded by: K. Natrayan
- Succeeded by: M. Chinnasamy
- Constituency: Karur, Tamil Nadu
- In office 1989–1991
- Preceded by: A.R. Murugaiah
- Succeeded by: N. Murugesan
- Constituency: Karur, Tamil Nadu
- In office 1984–1989
- Preceded by: K. Arjunan
- Succeeded by: M. G. Sekhar
- Constituency: Dharmapuri, Tamil Nadu

Member of Tamil Nadu Legislative Assembly
- In office 18 May 2001 – 25 May 2009
- Preceded by: E. G. Sugavanam
- Succeeded by: K. R. K. Narasimhan
- Constituency: Bargur
- In office 1977–1982
- Constituency: Erode

Minister for Education, Technical Education, Science and Technology, Sports and Youth Welfare, Archeology, Tamil Development and Tamil Culture, Indian Overseas, Refugees and Evacuees, Government of Tamil Nadu
- In office 16 May 2001 – 12 May 2006
- Chief Minister: J. Jayalalithaa; O. Panneerselvam; J. Jayalalithaa

Propaganda Secretary of All India Anna Dravida Munnetra Kazhagam
- Incumbent
- Assumed office 28 August 2007
- General Secretary: J. Jayalalithaa; V. K. Sasikala; Edappadi K. Palaniswami
- Preceded by: Edappadi K. Palaniswami

Member of Panel of Vice Chairpersons (Rajya Sabha)
- Incumbent
- Assumed office from Serving with Dinesh Sharma (politician), Bhubaneswar Kalita, S. Phangnon Konyak, Rajani Ashokrao Patil, Sasmit Patra, Tiruchi Siva, Sasmit Patra

Personal details
- Born: 15 March 1947 (age 79) Sinthagampalli, Madras Province, British India
- Party: All India Anna Dravida Munnetra Kazhagam (1972-present)
- Other political affiliations: Dravida Munnetra Kazhagam (1965-1972)
- Spouse: Banumathi Thambidurai (m. 1986)
- Children: 2
- Education: Madras Christian College

Munisamy Thambi Durai (born 15 March 1947) is an Indian politician from Tamil Nadu who served as the Deputy Speaker of the Lok Sabha and leader of All India Anna Dravida Munnetra Kazhagam (AIADMK) in the Lok Sabha, the lower house of the Indian Parliament. He currently serves as a Rajya Sabha member from Tamil Nadu. He had served as the Cabinet Minister of Law, Justice and Company Affairs and as the Minister of State of Surface Transport from March 1998 to April 1999. He had also served as the Deputy Speaker of the Lok Sabha from 1985 to 1989.

== Political career ==
Thambi Durai started his political career as a youth worker and student activist of the erstwhile united DMK in 1965 at the age of 18, when he was in the first year as a student of Madras Christian College. He participated in the anti-Hindi agitation of 1965 and courted arrest. He worked his way up in the Party as a hard working organizer, starting as a worker at the booth level for Municipal and Legislative Assembly polls in 1967 and 1971 for the DMK, and also as an Agitprop coordinator in universities and colleges. He was among the founding-members and first generation of the AIADMK in 1972 when the party split with M.G. Ramachandran. He became an MLA from Erode in 1977, and was first elected as a Member of Parliament to the 8th Lok Sabha in 1984 from Dharmapuri and was subsequently elected to the 9th, 12th, 15th and 16th Lok Sabha from Karur. He was also elected to the Tamil Nadu assembly in the 2001 and 2006 elections from Bargur Assembly constituency. He also served as minister of Education, Technical Education, Science and Technology, Sports and Youth Welfare, Archeology, Tamil Development and Tamil Culture, Indian Overseas, Refugees and Evacuees. He was in the portfolio during Jayalaithaa 2001 cabinet.

Thambidurai contested the 2014 Lok Sabha elections from Karur Lok Sabha constituency in Tamil Nadu and was subsequently elected as a member of the Indian Parliament. He had been serving as the leader of AIADMK in the Lok Sabha since 2009. He lost in the general elections in 2019 to Jothimani.

He was elected to Rajya Sabha in 2020 and subsequently re-elected in 2026.

== Elections Contested ==
=== Lok Sabha ===
Year	Constituency	Party	Votes	%	Opponent	Opponent Party	Opponent Votes	%	Result	Margin	%
1984	Dharmapuri	AIADMK	3,33,427	63.33	Parvathi Krishnan	CPI	1,82,175	34.6	Won	1,51,252	28.73
1989	Karur	AIADMK	4,84,492	65.6	K. C. Palanisamy	DMK	2,45,741	33.27	Won	2,38,751	32.33
1996	Karur	AIADMK	2,41,556	33.08	K. Natrayan	TMC(M)	4,09,830	56.12	Lost	-1,68,274	-23.04
1998	Karur	AIADMK	3,27,480	50.39	K. Natrayan	TMC(M)	2,83,807	43.67	Won	43,673	6.72
2009	Karur	AIADMK	3,80,542	46.21	K. C. Palanisamy	DMK	3,33,288	40.48	Won	47,254	5.73
2014	Karur	AIADMK	5,40,722	52.36	M. Chinnasamy	DMK	3,45,475	33.45	Won	1,95,247	18.91
2019	Karur	AIADMK	2,75,151	25.06	S. Jothimani	INC	6,95,697	63.36	Lost	-4,20,546	-38.3

=== Rajya Sabha ===
Position	Party	Constituency	From	To	Tenure
Member of Parliament, Rajya Sabha (1st Term)	AIADMK	Tamil Nadu	3 April 2020	2 April 2026	5 years, 364 days
Member of Parliament, Rajya Sabha (2nd Term)	AIADMK	Tamil Nadu	3 April 2026	Incumbent	184 days

=== Tamil Nadu Legislative Assembly ===
Election	Constituency	Political party	Result	Vote %	Opposition			Ref
Election	Constituency	Political party	Result	Vote %	Candidate	Political party	Vote %	Ref
2001	Bargur	AIADMK	Won	66.31%	E. G. Sugavanam	DMK	26.46%	
2006	Bargur	AIADMK	Won	42.67%	V. Vetriselvan	DMK	40.44%	

== Personal life ==
Dr.M.Thambidurai born in Sinthagampalli village of krishnagiri district Tamil Nadu belongs to a virakodi vellala Community which is a majority in some of the Districts of Tamil Nadu. He is member of the Trust of Adhiyamaan Educational and Research Institutions, Chennai; St.Peter's Institute of Higher Education and Research Chennai; Lakshmi Sarawathi Educational Trust, Chennai; Kovai Kalaimagal Educational Trust which is managed by his wife Dr. T. Bhanumathi. He has two daughters .

== Nickname ==
M. Thamidurai also has a nickname, known to be, "Kriblomus", Thambidurai was known to be called this nickname as a kid by his brothers and he also was known to be a very large jokester.
