= Kanchi Kalyanasundaram =

Indian politician

Member of Parliament, Rajya Sabha
- In office 1969–1976
- Constituency: Tamil Nadu

Personal details
- Born: 26 August 1909
- Died: 3 May 1982 (aged 72)
- Party: Dravida Munnetra Kazhagam
- Spouse: Valliammal

Kanchi Kalyanasundaram (26 August 1909 – 3 May 1982) was an Indian politician. He was a Member of Parliament, representing Tamil Nadu in the Rajya Sabha the upper house of India's Parliament as a member of the Dravida Munnetra Kazhagam.
