= Phangnon Konyak =

Indian politician

Member of Parliament, Rajya Sabha
- Incumbent
- Assumed office 3 April 2022
- Preceded by: K. G. Kenye
- Constituency: Nagaland

Member of Panel of Vice Chairpersons (Rajya Sabha)
- Incumbent
- Assumed office 01 December 2025 Serving with Dinesh Sharma, Ghanshyam Tiwari, Phulo Devi Netam, Sasmit Patra, M. Thambidurai, Sasmit Patra

Personal details
- Born: Phangnon Wangsha Konyak; 5 February 1978 (age 48) Mon, Nagaland, India
- Party: Bharatiya Janata Party
- Parents: C. Shingwang Konyak (father); N. Alila Shingwang (mother)
- Education: Union Christian College; Delhi University (MA)

S. Phangnon Konyak is an Indian politician from Nagaland. In March 2022, she became the first woman to be elected as Member of Rajya Sabha from Nagaland and the second woman from the state to be elected to either House of the Parliament or the State Assembly. She is the State President of BJP Mahila Morcha, Nagaland. She is also a national secretary of the Bharatiya Janata Party.

She has also served as a vice-chairperson of the Rajya Sabha, since July 2023, making her the first woman to be appointed in that position.

== Early life ==
Konyak did her schooling from Holy Cross Higher Secondary School, Dimapur. She holds a master's degree in English literature from Daulat Ram College (2002 batch), affiliated with University of Delhi. She was involved in student activism and social organizations.

== Political career ==
Konyak joined the Bharatiya Janata Party (BJP). She is the state president of BJP Mahila Morcha, Nagaland. In March 2022, she became the first woman to be elected as member of Parliament, Rajya Sabha from Nagaland, and the second woman from the state to be elected to either House of the Parliament or the State Assembly. In July 2023, she was appointed to the Panel of Vice-Chairpersons of the Rajya Sabha, becoming the first woman to be appointed to that position. Konyak also serves as a member of the Committee on Transport, Tourism and Culture and the Consultative Committee for the Ministry of Development of North Eastern Region. She is a member of the Committee on Empowerment of Women and of the Governing Council of the North Eastern Indira Gandhi Regional Institute of Health and Medical Sciences.

== Positions held ==
Tenure	Position
Feb. 2026 onwards	Member, India - Thailand Parliamentary Friendship Group
Dec. 2025 onwards	Member, General Purposes Committee
Nov. 2025 onwards	Member, Board of Governors of the National Institute of Fashion Technology (NIFT)
May 2025 onwards	Member, Court of Nagaland University
April 2025 onwards	Member, Court of North Eastern Hill University
Aug. 2024 onwards	Member, Committee on the Welfare of Scheduled Castes and Scheduled Tribes
Feb. 2024 onwards	Member, Court of the Rajiv Gandhi University
July 2023	Nominated to the Panel of Vice-Chairpersons, Rajya Sabha (re-nominated in July, Nov 2024, Nov. 2025 and April 2026)
Dec. 2022 onwards	Member, Governing Council of the North-Eastern Indira Gandhi Regional Institute of Health and Medical Sciences, Shillong
Nov. 2022 onwards	Member, House Committee
Oct. 2022 – Oct. 2023	Member, Committee on Empowerment of Women
Sept. 2022 – June 2024; Oct. 2024 onwards	Member, Consultative Committee for the Ministry of Development of North Eastern Region
Sept. 2022 – June 2024; Sept. 2024 onwards	Member, Committee on Transport, Tourism and Culture
April 2022	Elected to Rajya Sabha
