= A. A. Rahim (politician, born 1980) =

Indian politician

Member of Parliament, Rajya Sabha
- Incumbent
- Assumed office April 2022

Personal details
- Born: 8 May 1980 (age 46) Thiruvananthapuram, Kerala, India
- Party: CPI(M)
- Spouse: Amrutha Rahim

A. Abdul Samad Rahim (born 8 May 1980) is an Indian politician, who currently serves as a member of Rajya Sabha from Kerala, since 2022. He is currently officiating as the all India president of Democratic Youth Federation of India. Rahim is a member of the Kerala State Committee of Communist Party of India (Marxist).

In 2022, he became the second youngest CPI(M) member to become a Rajya Sabha member, after M. A. Baby. Rahim gained public attention after participating in prime-time television debates in Malayalam news channels. Rahim has also served as the Central Executive Committee member of Students Federation of India and the syndicate member of University of Kerala.

== Early life ==
Rahim was born in Thycaud in Manikkal grama panchayath, near Venjaramoodu in Thiruvananthapuram district, India. His parents are M. Abdul Samad, a war veteran, and A. Nabeesa Beevi. Rahim completed his primary education at Pirappankode Government L. P. School. He completed SSLC from Pirappankode Government Higher Secondary School. Later, he did his pre-degree from NSS College Nilamel in Kollam. Rahim completed his bachelor's degree and post-graduate degree in Islamic History from University College, Thiruvananthapuram. Later, he graduated in law from Kerala Law Academy Law College, Thiruvananthapuram and enrolled as a lawyer in Bar Council of Kerala. He continued his research in Islamic History at the University of Kerala on the topic "print media and the Muslim renaissance movements in Kerala". Rahim also holds a diploma in journalism from Bharatiya Vidya Bhavan, Thiruvananthapuram. He has briefly worked as a journalist at Kairali TV.

== Political career ==
A. A. Rahim has been the Chairman of the Kerala University Union and a member of the Kerala University Syndicate. In the 2011 Assembly elections, he contested as the Left Democratic Front candidate from Varkala Assembly constituency. He was the editor of Yuvadhara magazine. He has served as the Kerala state Vice President of Students Federation of India, Kerala State Secretary of Democratic Youth Federation of India,

In 2020, under the leadership of Rahim, DYFI organised a campaign called 'Recycle Kerala' to collect recyclable waste material from homes and public places. As a part of the 'Recycle Kerala' campaign, DYFI workers across Kerala collected about 6.5 tonnes of plastic waste from the state's water bodies. DYFI collected about Rs. 10.95 Crore which was donated to Rebuild Kerala initiative of the then LDF Government.

Currently, he is officiating as the national President of Democratic Youth Federation of India. He is a member of the Kerala state committee of Communist Party of India (Marxist).

== Personal life ==
He was married to Amrita Satheesan and has two children, Gulmohar and Gulnar.
