= Viduthalai Virumbi =

Member of Parliament, Rajya Sabha
- In office 1989-1995 ,1998-2004
- Constituency: Tamil Nadu

Personal details
- Born: 22 December 1939 (age 86) Sankarankovil, Tirunelveli Dt
- Party: DMK
- Spouse: [nithya kalyani]

Viduthalai Virumbi is a Member of the Parliament of India representing Tamil Nadu in the Rajya Sabha, the upper house of the Indian Parliament as a member of the Dravida Munnetra Kazhagam party.

== Electoral History ==
=== Rajya Sabha ===
Position	Party	Constituency	From	To	Tenure
Member of Parliament, Rajya Sabha (1st Term)	DMK	Tamil Nadu	15 March 1989	24 July 1989	131 days
Member of Parliament, Rajya Sabha (2nd Term)	DMK	Tamil Nadu	25 July 1989	24 July 1995	5 years, 364 days
Member of Parliament, Rajya Sabha (3rd Term)	DMK	Tamil Nadu	30 June 1998	29 June 2004	5 years, 365 days
