= Ghulam Ali Khatana =

Indian politician

- Appointed by: Droupadi Murmu (President of India)
- Constituency: Nominated (Social Work)

Ghulam Ali Khatana is an Indian politician who is serving as Nominated Member of Rajya Sabha and Secretary and Spokesperson of Bharatiya Janata Party Jammu & Kashmir unit.
