= Darshana Singh =

Indian politician

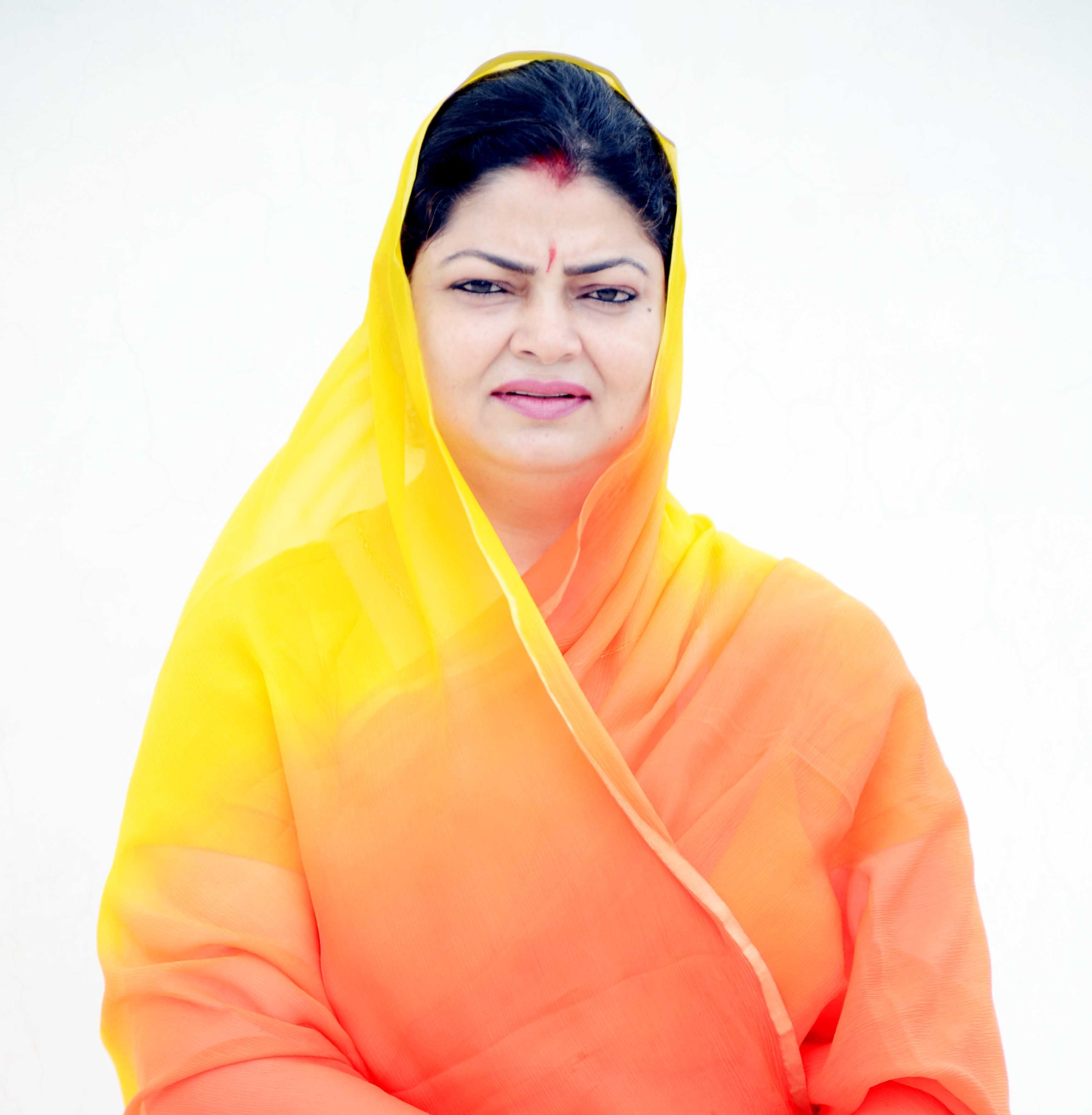
- Preceded by: Swati Singh

Member of Parliament, Rajya Sabha
- In office Asssumed office 5 July 2022
- Constituency: Uttar Pradesh

National Vice-President, BJP Mahila Morcha
- In office 21 June 2021

Member of Consultative Committee for Ministry of Railways (India)

BJP Mahila Morcha UP State President
- In office 10-02-2018 to 21-06-2021

Personal details
- Born: 10 July 1974 (age 52)
- Spouse: Rananjay Singh
- Children: 1
- Education: Allahabad University

Darshana Singh (born 10 July 1974) is an Indian politician and a member of the Rajya Sabha, the upper house of the Parliament of India from Uttar Pradesh as a member of the Bharatiya Janata Party. She is also holding the position of National Vice President of BJP Mahila Morcha. She previously served as State President of BJP UP Mahila Morcha.

== Early life ==
She is gold medalist in her MA in History from DAV College, Azamgarh in 1996. Later, she completed P.G. Diploma in Journalism and Visual Communication from Allahabad University.

== Positions held ==
- 05-July-2022 To Present, Member of the Parliament Rajya Sabha.
- 21-June-2021 To Present, National Vice President of BJP Mahila Morcha.
- 10-Feb-2018 To 21-June-2021, UP President of BJP Mahila Morcha.
- 2016–2018, Secretary of Bhartiya Janta Party, Kashi area, Uttar Pradesh
- 2013–2015, Bhartiya Janta Party District President, Mahila Morcha of Chandauli district, Uttar Pradesh
- 2011–2013, Bhartiya Janta Party District President, Mahila Morcha of Chandauli district, Uttar Pradesh
