= Baburam Nishad =

Indian politician

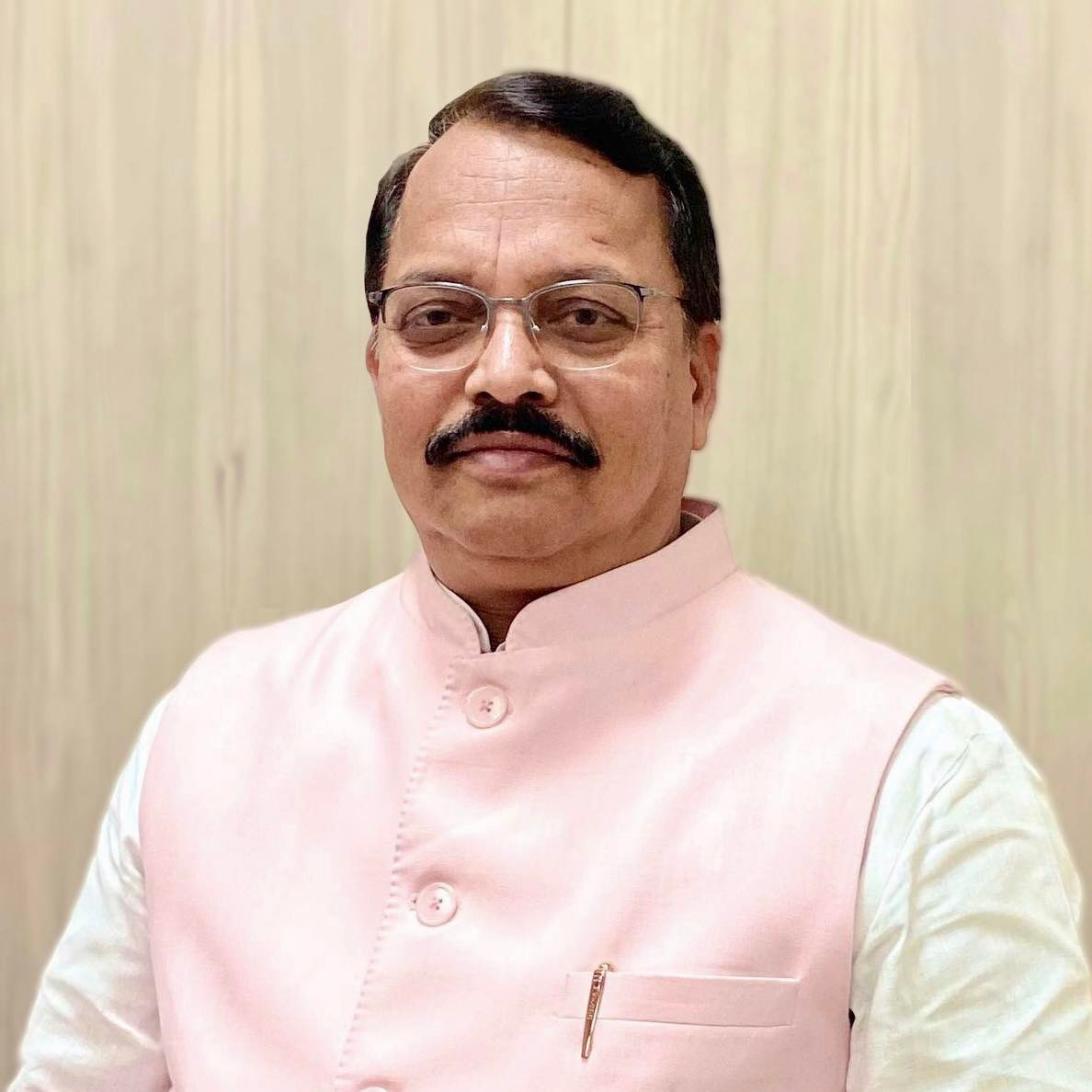

Member of Parliament, Rajya Sabha
- Incumbent
- Assumed office 5 July 2022
- Constituency: Uttar Pradesh

Personal details
- Born: 15 August 1969 (age 57) Hamirpur, Uttar Pradesh, India
- Party: Bharatiya Janata Party
- Spouse: Neetu Nishad (m. 2005)
- Children: 2 (1 son and 1 daughter)
- Parents: Ramsi Nishad (father); Sukhiya Devi (mother)
- Education: Bundelkhand University

Baburam Nishad is an Indian politician and a member of the Rajya Sabha, upper house of the Parliament of India from Uttar Pradesh as a member of the Bharatiya Janata Party.

== Political background ==
Baburam Nishad is considered to be the grassroots leader of Bundelkhand Region. From former Chief Minister Kalyan Singh's government to Government of Chief Minister Yogi Adityanath, he worked in various positions in the party and government. During a political program, Chief Minister Yogi Adityanath had praised him on the stage. Between 2018-2022 Baburam Nishad was Chairman Uttar Pradesh Backward Classes Finance Development Corporation equivalent to (mos rank). From 1999-2004 he had also been President - Uttar Pradesh Fisheries Cooperative Federation, Uttar Pradesh in Kalyan Singh Government (mos rank).He also held various positions within the party, He was made State Vice President, Uttar Pradesh in 2016. He became Regional Coordinator Kanpur - Bundelkhand, BJP. Regional President - Bundelkhand, Bharatiya Janata Party, District President of Hamirpur-Uttar Pradesh Bharatiya Janata Party️.He started District President Yuva Morcha - Hamirpur, Uttar Pradesh Bharatiya Janata Party In 1992.

Baburam Nishad has made a remarkable revolutionary contribution in the interest of fishermen in Uttar Pradesh after independence, especially as the President of Uttar Pradesh Matsya Jeevi Sahakari Sangh Limited, Lucknow. In 1998, at the age of just 29, he became the youngest President of this cooperative union. At that time the Matsya Jeevi Sahakari Sangh was in loss. Under his leadership, within about 5 years the cooperative union not only covered the loss but also made a profit and distributed dividends.

During his tenure, Matsya Jeevi Sahakari Sangh Limited of Uttar Pradesh became a successful example across the country, especially in the field of development of fishermen. Which empowered the fishermen economy in the state.

With the efforts of Baburam Nishad, the movement in the interest of Nishads in Uttar Pradesh became transparent and effective. He toured the entire state during his tenure, during his tenure mainly promoted fisheries, ensured socio-economic upliftment of the fishermen community, and strengthened their position by organizing primary fisheries cooperative societies and district unions. During this period, the main focus was to promote fisheries in rural areas, organize the fishermen community and create employment for them. The union contributed to accelerating the Blue Revolution, under which fisheries were encouraged in ponds, reservoirs and natural lakes.

Due to his achievements, he came to be known as the "Development Man of Fishermen" in Uttar Pradesh.

Major achievements:

Bringing Uttar Pradesh Matsya Jeevi Sahakari Sangh Limited, Lucknow from loss to profit.

Promoting Matsya Jeevi Sahakari Sangh Limited at the national level.

Strengthening Matsya Jeevi Sahakari Sangh Limited.

Economic empowerment: During this period, financial assistance was provided to small and marginal fishermen under the schemes of the Government of India.

Membership expansion: Providing membership to as many primary fisheries cooperative societies and district unions as possible.

This contribution shows the vision and organizational skills of Baburam Nishad in the hit to fishermen of Uttar Pradesh.
