= Sulata Deo =

Indian politician

Member of Parliament, Rajya Sabha
- Incumbent
- Assumed office 2022
- Constituency: List of Rajya Sabha members from Odisha

Personal details
- Born: Jajpur
- Party: Biju Janata Dal
- Children: 1 daughter

Sulata Deo is an Indian politician and a member of the Rajya Sabha, upper house of the Parliament of India from Odisha as member of the Biju Janata Dal. She was previously advisor to the 'Mission Shakti' program of Govt of Odisha. She is also spokesperson of BJD.
