= K. R. N. Rajeshkumar =

Indian politician

Member of Parliament, Rajya Sabha
- Incumbent
- Assumed office 30 June 2022
- Constituency: Tamil Nadu

Personal details
- Party: Dravida Munnetra Kazhagam

K. R. N. Rajeshkumar is an Indian politician. He was elected to the Rajya Sabha, upper house of the Parliament of India from Tamil Nadu as a member of the Dravida Munnetra Kazhagam.
