= S. Kalyanasundaram =

Indian politician

S. Kalyanasundaram is an Indian politician from Dravida Munnetra Kazhagam who is serving as the Member of Rajya Sabha from 30 June 2022.He is DMK District Secretary for Thanjavur North.He is Chairman Kumbakonam Mutual Benefit Fund Ltd.

== Personal life ==
He was born on 24 June 1940 in Kumbakonam, Tamil Nadu.
