= Sasmit Patra =

Indian politician

- ସସ୍ମିତ ପାତ୍ର

Member of Parliament, Rajya Sabha
- Incumbent
- Assumed office 28 June 2019
- Constituency: List of Rajya Sabha members from Odisha

Member of Panel of Vice Chairpersons (Rajya Sabha)
- Incumbent
- Assumed office from Serving with Dinesh Sharma (politician), Bhubaneswar Kalita, S. Phangnon Konyak, Rajani Ashokrao Patil, Tiruchi Siva, M. Thambidurai, Sasmit Patra

Personal details
- Born: Sasmit Patra; 23 March 1979 (age 47) Cuttack
- Party: Biju Janata Dal
- Spouse: Sweta Millicent Paul
- Children: 1 son and 1 daughter
- Parents: Swarupananda Patra (father); Rashmi Mohapatra (mother)
- Education: Ph.D., MBA, LLB
- Alma mater: Utkal University, BJB Autonomous College
- Profession: Politician, Lawyer, Academician

Sasmit Patra (Odia: ସସ୍ମିତ ପାତ୍ର) is an Indian politician, academician, and lawyer, currently serving as a Member of Parliament in the Rajya Sabha, representing Odisha. Known for his articulate speeches and active participation in parliamentary debates.

He is currently national Spokesperson of Biju Janata Dal and also holds the position of the Chief Whip of the party in the upper house. He was renominated to the Rajya Sabha by Biju Janata Dal for a second term in May 2022.

== Early life and education ==
Sasmit Patra was born to Dr. Swarupananda Patra and Rashmi Mohapatra. His father was the president of the Odisha Minority Forum (OMF). Patra belongs to a Christian family.

Dr. Patra pursued his education at Utkal University, Bhubaneswar, and Allahabad Agricultural Institute (Deemed University), Prayagraj, Uttar Pradesh.

His academic qualifications include:

- Ph.D. (Business Management)
- MBA (specialization in HR)
- LLB (Law Graduate)
- B.A. (Education Hons.)

Dr. Patra married Sweta Millicent Paul, an academician by profession, on 6 February 2004. The couple resides in Bhubaneswar, Odisha.

== Professional career ==
Before entering politics, Dr. Patra had a diverse professional career spanning academia, public policy, governance, and law:

- Worked on a UNDP-Government of Odisha development project.
- Held teaching roles in organizational behavior and human resource management.
- Practiced law on a pro bono basis.
- Contributed to public policy development through his work with the Odisha government.
- Distinguished professor, Management Development Institute, Gurgaon

He has an extensive academic background and has served as the Dean of Xavier-Emlyon Business School, a joint collaboration between Xavier University, Bhubaneswar and Emlyon Business School, France.

== Political career ==
Dr. Patra has experience in various roles throughout different branches.

His key roles include:

- Member of Parliament (Rajya Sabha)
- Member of Vice-Chairmen Panel of Rajya Sabha
- Member, Parliamentary Departmental Standing Committee on Human Resource Development which covers the Ministry of HRD, Women and Child Development, Skill Development and Entrepreneurship, and Sports and Youth Affairs
- Member, Parliamentary Joint Committee on Office of Profit, Privileges, General Purposes, and Ethics
- National Spokesperson and Media Coordinator, Biju Janata Dal
- Secretary and Member of State Council of Biju Janata Dal as well as Member of the BJD’s IT Wing Core Committee.

As of January 2024, according to the official records of the Rajya Sabha, Dr. Patra has asked 436 questions, introduced 16 Private Members' Bills, and participated in 1,388 debates in the Rajya Sabha, with an overall attendance of 92%, including 100% attendance in 10 out of 14 sessions since July 2019.

== Controversies ==
In April 2025, Dr. Patra faced criticism within his party for creating confusion over voting on the Waqf (Amendment) Bill in the Rajya Sabha. Despite the BJD's decision to oppose the bill, Patra publicly stated that MPs could vote according to their conscience, leading to internal discord among party members.

Several senior leaders demanded disciplinary action against him for allegedly contradicting party directives and causing damage to its image among minority communities.

== See also ==
- Biju Janata Dal
- Naveen Pattnaik
- Rajya Sabha
- Politics of Odisha
- Member of Parliament, Rajya Sabha
