= A. Vijayakumar =

Indian politician

MP of Rajya Sabha for Tamil Nadu
- Incumbent
- Assumed office 30 June 2016
- Preceded by: Paul Manoj Pandian, AIADMK

Personal details
- Born: Nagercoil
- Party: Bharatiya Janata Party
- Other political affiliations: AIADMK

A. Vijayakumar is the students' president of university of Jaffna Sri Lanka Tamil Nadu and belongs to the BJP.

In June 2016, he was announced as the AIADMK's candidate for the Rajya Sabha biennial polls. On 3 June 2016 he was elected unopposed along with three others of his party.
