= R. Girirajan =

Indian politician

Member of Parliament, Rajya Sabha
- Incumbent
- Assumed office 30 June 2022
- Constituency: Tamil Nadu

Personal details
- Born: 12/05/1961 Chennai, Tamil Nadu
- Party: Dravida Munnetra Kazhagam
- Spouse: Mythili Girirajan
- Children: 2

R. Girirajan is an advocate, Indian politician and a member of the Rajya Sabha, upper house of the Parliament of India from Tamil Nadu as a member of the Dravida Munnetra Kazhagam. He is affiliated with the Dravida Munnetra Kazhagam (DMK), one of the major political parties in the region. Within the DMK, he holds the position of Bylaw Amendment Secretary, playing a key role in shaping the party's internal governance framework. Prior to his tenure in the Rajya Sabha, Girirajan contested the 2014 Lok Sabha elections from the North Chennai constituency, reflecting his longstanding engagement in both state and national politics.
