= Ghanshyam Tiwari (politician, born 1947) =

Indian politician (born 1947)

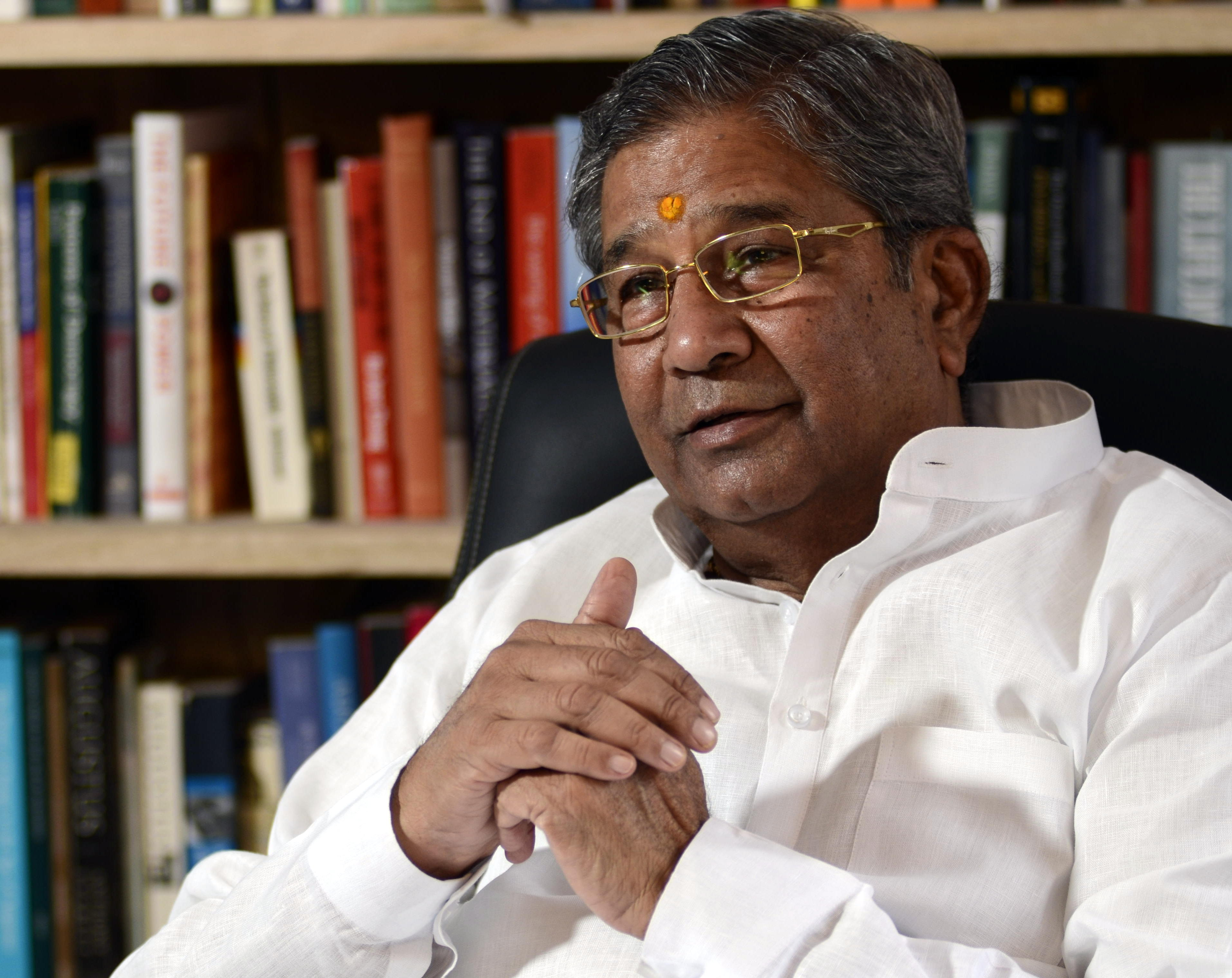

Member of Parliament, Rajya Sabha
- Incumbent
- Assumed office July 2022
- Constituency: Rajasthan

Rajasthan Minister of Food & Civil Supplies, Law & Justice
- In office 2007–2008

Rajasthan Minister of Education, Parliamentary Affairs
- In office 2003–2007

Member of the Rajasthan Legislative Assembly
- In office 1980–1990
- Preceded by: Ranmal Singh
- Succeeded by: Rajendra Pareek
- Constituency: Sikar
- In office 1993–1998
- Preceded by: Rameshwar Dayal Yadav
- Succeeded by: Bhagwan Sahai Saini
- Constituency: Chomu
- In office 2003–2018
- Preceded by: Indira Mayaram
- Succeeded by: Ashok Lahoty
- Constituency: Sanganer

Personal details
- Born: 19 December 1947 (age 78) Sikar, Rajputana Agency
- Party: Bharatiya Janata Party (since 2020; 1980–2018)
- Other political affiliations: Bharat Vahini Party (2018–2020); Janata Party (1975–1980)
- Spouse: Pushpa Tiwari

Ghanshyam Tiwari (born 19 December 1947) is an Indian politician who has served as the MLA of the Sanganer constituency, located in Rajasthan between 2013 and 2018. He is a member of the Bharatiya Janata Party. 6 time MLA Tiwari has been winning for the last three consecutive elections from the same constituency.

== Minister Of Power ==
In office - 2 July 1998 - 30 November 1998
Chief minister - Bhairo Singh Shekhawat

== Minister of Education, Minister of Parliamentary Affairs ==
December, 2003 - December 2007
Chief Minister - Vasundhara Raje

== Minister of Food & Civil Supplies, Minister of Law & Justice ==
December 2007 - 2008
Chief Minister - Vasundhara Raje

== Position in BJP ==
District President	Sikar	1981
General Secretary	Rajasthan	1991
president, BJP	Rajasthan	1985 to 2003
Member, BJP National Council		1992 to 1994
Spokesperson, BJP	Rajasthan	1992 to 1994
Member, Election Committee,	Rajasthan	1992 to 1994
Member, National Administrative, BJP		2002 to Present
President, Election Manifesto, 2008 elections, Rajasthan		

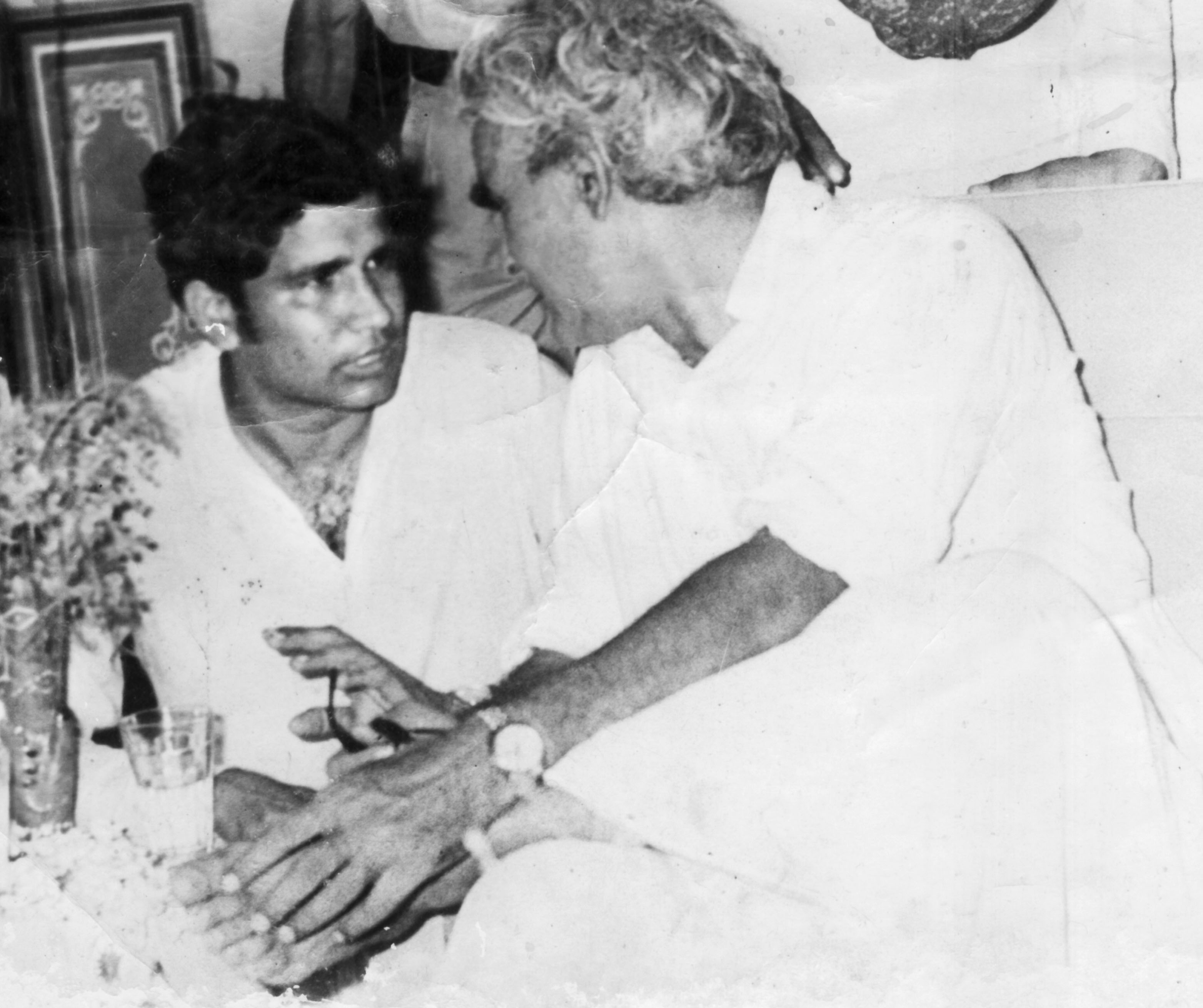
Tiwari with Bhairon Singh Shekhawat

== Early life and education ==
Ghanshyam Tiwari was born on 19 December 1947 in Sikar Rajasthan. While pursuing the bachelor's degree from Sri Kalyan Sanskrit College, Sikar, he was given the position of general secretary in the Students' Union of the college. After graduating from the Sanskrit college, he came to Jaipur for his L.L.B. In these years he was a member of the University Apex Body. He was also the organizer and Vice President of ABVP.

== Political career ==
During the emergency in 1975, Tiwari became a full-fledged politician. He battled the dominating policies of the government. Due to his fight against the central government, Tiwari was imprisoned and tortured. Then some national level activists like Jayaprakash Narayan and Atal Bihari Vajpayee started a movement against the government in defense of Tiwari.

Tiwari contested in Rajasthan assembly elections of 1980 from Sikar constituency and won. He was twice consecutively re-elected as MLA, 1980–85 and 1985–89.

== Role in BJP ==
Tiwari was a member of the Janata Party. Due to internal conflicts, some members separated from the Janata Party and created the Bharatiya Janata Party on April 6, 1980. Tiwari was one of the founders of the BJP in Rajasthan.

== Achievements as minister ==
Tiwari has served as the minister of various departments in the cabinet of Rajasthan government. He was the Power Minister in the Government of Bhairo Singh Shekhawat during July 1998 to November 1998. After a few years, he was given multiple departments in Vasundhara Raje's government. Tiwari was heading primary and secondary education department, law and Justice Department, Parliamentary Affairs Department simultaneously from 2003 to 2007. Tiwari made new policies in the department related to transfer and placements. He distributed free textbooks to students. There were more than 1.5 Lakh teachers appointed during his term.
