= List of Rajya Sabha members from Uttar Pradesh =

The Rajya Sabha (meaning the "Council of States") is the upper house of the Parliament of India. Uttar Pradesh state elects 31 members and they are indirectly elected by the state legislators of Uttar Pradesh. Members are elected for six years and 1/3 of members are retired after every two years. The number of seats, allocated to the party, are determined by the number of seats a party possesses during nomination and the party nominates a member to be voted on. Elections within the state legislatures are held using Single transferable vote with proportional representation.

== Current members ==
Keys: BJP (24) SP (4) RLD (1) BSP (1) IND (1)

#	Name	Party	Term start	Term end
1	Sudhanshu Trivedi	BJP	03-Apr-2024	02-Apr-2030
2	Sadhana Singh	BJP	03-Apr-2024	02-Apr-2030
3	Sanjay Seth	BJP	03-Apr-2024	02-Apr-2030
4	Naveen Jain	BJP	03-Apr-2024	02-Apr-2030
5	Chaudhary Tejveer Singh	BJP	03-Apr-2024	02-Apr-2030
6	Ratanjit Pratap Narain Singh	BJP	03-Apr-2024	02-Apr-2030
7	Amarpal Maurya	BJP	03-Apr-2024	02-Apr-2030
8	Sangeeta Balwant	BJP	03-Apr-2024	02-Apr-2030
9	Laxmikant Bajpai	BJP	05-Jul-2022	04-Jul-2028
10	Darshana Singh	BJP	05-Jul-2022	04-Jul-2028
11	Radha Mohan Das Agarwal	BJP	05-Jul-2022	04-Jul-2028
12	Sangeeta Yadav	BJP	05-Jul-2022	04-Jul-2028
13	Surendra Singh Nagar	BJP	05-Jul-2022	04-Jul-2028
14	Baburam Nishad	BJP	05-Jul-2022	04-Jul-2028
15	K. Laxman	BJP	05-Jul-2022	04-Jul-2028
16	Mithlesh Kumar	BJP	05-Jul-2022	04-Jul-2028
17	Dinesh Sharma	BJP	09-Sep-2023	25-Nov-2026
18	Seema Dwivedi	BJP	26-Nov-2020	25-Nov-2026
19	Arun Singh	BJP	26-Nov-2020	25-Nov-2026
20	Neeraj Shekhar	BJP	26-Nov-2020	25-Nov-2026
21	Banwari Lal Verma	BJP	26-Nov-2020	25-Nov-2026
22	Geeta Shakya	BJP	26-Nov-2020	25-Nov-2026
23	Brij Lal	BJP	26-Nov-2020	25-Nov-2026
24	Hardeep Singh Puri	BJP	26-Nov-2020	25-Nov-2026
25	Ramji Lal Suman	SP	03-Apr-2024	02-Apr-2030
26	Jaya Bachchan	SP	03-Apr-2024	02-Apr-2030
27	Javed Ali Khan	SP	05-Jul-2022	04-Jul-2028
28	Ram Gopal Yadav	SP	26-Nov-2020	25-Nov-2026
29	Kapil Sibal	Ind	05-Jul-2022	04-Jul-2028
30	Jayant Chaudhary	RLD	05-Jul-2022	04-Jul-2028
31	Ramji Gautam	BSP	26-Nov-2020	25-Nov-2026

== Term wise list of all members from Uttar Pradesh ==
This is the term wise list of current and former Rajya Sabha members from Uttar Pradesh.
Source: Parliament of India (Rajya Sabha) * represents current and upcoming members

Name	Party	Term start	Term end	Term(s)	Notes
Dharmpal Singh	BJP	26-Nov-2026	25-Nov-2032	1	
Radhakant Ojha	BJP	26-Nov-2026	25-Nov-2032	1	
Prakash Pal	BJP	26-Nov-2026	25-Nov-2032	1	
Vidyasagar Sonkar	BJP	26-Nov-2026	25-Nov-2032	1	
Gopi Krishna Pandey	BJP	26-Nov-2026	25-Nov-2032	1	
Priyanka Singh Rawat	BJP	26-Nov-2026	25-Nov-2032	1	
Ram Pratap Singh Chauhan	BJP	26-Nov-2026	25-Nov-2032	1	
Shruti Gangwar	BJP	26-Nov-2026	25-Nov-2032	1	
Ram Gopal Yadav	SP	26-Nov-2026	25-Nov-2032	6	
Dhanraj Nathwani	SP	26-Nov-2026	25-Nov-2032	1	
Sudhanshu Trivedi	BJP	03-Apr-2024	02-Apr-2030	2	
Sadhana Singh	BJP	03-Apr-2024	02-Apr-2030	1	
Naveen Jain	BJP	03-Apr-2024	02-Apr-2030	1	
Sanjay Seth	BJP	03-Apr-2024	02-Apr-2030	3	
Ratanjit Pratap Narain Singh	BJP	03-Apr-2024	02-Apr-2030	1	
Amarpal Maurya	BJP	03-Apr-2024	02-Apr-2030	1	
Chaudhary Tejveer Singh	BJP	03-Apr-2024	02-Apr-2030	1	
Sangeeta Balwant	BJP	03-Apr-2024	02-Apr-2030	1	
Jaya Bachchan	SP	03-Apr-2024	02-Apr-2030	5	
Ramji Lal Suman	SP	03-Apr-2024	02-Apr-2030	1	
Dinesh Sharma	BJP	09-Sep-2023	25-Nov-2026	1	bye - death of Hardwar Dubey
Laxmikant Bajpai	BJP	05-Jul-2022	04-Jul-2028	1	
Darshana Singh	BJP	05-Jul-2022	04-Jul-2028	1	
Radha Mohan Das Agarwal	BJP	05-Jul-2022	04-Jul-2028	1	
Surendra Singh Nagar	BJP	05-Jul-2022	04-Jul-2028	3	
Sangeeta Yadav	BJP	05-Jul-2022	04-Jul-2028	1	
Baburam Nishad	BJP	05-Jul-2022	04-Jul-2028	1	
Mithlesh Kumar	BJP	05-Jul-2022	04-Jul-2028	1	
K. Laxman	BJP	05-Jul-2022	04-Jul-2028	1	
Javed Ali Khan	SP	05-Jul-2022	04-Jul-2028	2	
Jayant Chaudhary	RLD	05-Jul-2022	04-Jul-2028	1	
Kapil Sibal	Ind	05-Jul-2022	04-Jul-2028	3	
Seema Dwivedi	BJP	26-Nov-2020	25-Nov-2026	1	
Hardwar Dubey	BJP	26-Nov-2020	26-Jun-2023	1	death
Arun Singh	BJP	26-Nov-2020	25-Nov-2026	2	
Neeraj Shekhar	BJP	26-Nov-2020	25-Nov-2026	3	
Geeta Shakya	BJP	26-Nov-2020	25-Nov-2026	1	
B. L. Verma	BJP	26-Nov-2020	25-Nov-2026	1	
Brij Lal	BJP	26-Nov-2020	25-Nov-2026	1	
Hardeep Singh Puri	BJP	26-Nov-2020	25-Nov-2026	2	
Ram Gopal Yadav	SP	26-Nov-2020	25-Nov-2026	5	
Ramji Gautam	BSP	26-Nov-2020	25-Nov-2026	1	
Syed Zafar Islam	BJP	04-Sep-2020	04-Jul-2022	1	bye - death of Amar Singh
Jai Prakash Nishad	BJP	17-Aug-2020	04-Jul-2022	1	bye - death of Beni Prasad Verma
Arun Singh	BJP	06-Dec-2019	25-Nov-2020	1	bye - resignation of Tazeen Fatma
Sudhanshu Trivedi	BJP	09-Oct-2019	02-Apr-2024	1	bye - death of Arun Jaitley
Surendra Singh Nagar	BJP	16-Sep-2019	04-Jul-2022	2	bye - resignation by himself
Sanjay Seth	BJP	16-Sep-2019	04-Jul-2022	2	bye - resignation by himself
Neeraj Shekhar	BJP	20-Aug-2019	25-Nov-2020	2	bye - resignation by himself
Ashok Bajpai	BJP	03-Apr-2018	02-Apr-2024	1	
Arun Jaitley	BJP	03-Apr-2018	24-Aug-2019	1	death
Vijaypal Singh Tomar	BJP	03-Apr-2018	02-Apr-2024	1	
Anil Agrawal	BJP	03-Apr-2018	02-Apr-2024	1	
Anil Jain	BJP	03-Apr-2018	02-Apr-2024	1	
Harnath Singh Yadav	BJP	03-Apr-2018	02-Apr-2024	1	
Sakal Deep Rajbhar	BJP	03-Apr-2018	02-Apr-2024	1	
Kanta Kardam	BJP	03-Apr-2018	02-Apr-2024	1	
G. V. L. Narasimha Rao	BJP	03-Apr-2018	02-Apr-2024	1	
Jaya Bachchan	SP	03-Apr-2018	02-Apr-2024	4	
Hardeep Singh Puri	BJP	08-Jan-2018	25-Nov-2020	1	bye - resignation of Manohar Parrikar
Sukhram Singh Yadav	SP	05-Jul-2016	04-Jul-2022	1	
Beni Prasad Verma	SP	05-Jul-2016	27-Mar-2020	1	death
Vishambhar Prasad Nishad	SP	05-Jul-2016	04-Jul-2022	2	
Surendra Singh Nagar	SP	05-Jul-2016	02-Aug-2019	1	resigned
Sanjay Seth	SP	05-Jul-2016	05-Aug-2019	1	resigned
Rewati Raman Singh	SP	05-Jul-2016	04-Jul-2022	1	
Amar Singh	Ind	05-Jul-2016	01-Aug-2020	4	death
Ashok Siddharth	BSP	05-Jul-2016	04-Jul-2022	1	
Satish Chandra Mishra	BSP	05-Jul-2016	04-Jul-2022	3	
Shiv Pratap Shukla	BJP	05-Jul-2016	04-Jul-2022	1	
Kapil Sibal	INC	05-Jul-2016	04-Jul-2022	2	
Ram Gopal Yadav	SP	26-Nov-2014	25-Nov-2020	4	
Chandrapal Singh Yadav	SP	26-Nov-2014	25-Nov-2020	1	
Ravi Prakash Verma	SP	26-Nov-2014	25-Nov-2020	1	
Javed Ali Khan	SP	26-Nov-2014	25-Nov-2020	1	
Neeraj Shekhar	SP	26-Nov-2014	15-Jul-2019	1	resigned
Tazeen Fatma	SP	26-Nov-2014	03-Nov-2019	1	elected to Rampur Assembly
Veer Singh	BSP	26-Nov-2014	25-Nov-2020	3	
Rajaram	BSP	26-Nov-2014	25-Nov-2020	2	
Manohar Parrikar	BJP	26-Nov-2014	02-Sep-2017	1	resigned
P. L. Punia	INC	26-Nov-2014	25-Nov-2020	1	
Vishambhar Prasad Nishad	SP	03-Jun-2014	04-Jul-2016	1	bye - resignation of S. P. Singh Baghel
Kanak Lata Singh	SP	14-Dec-2013	04-Jul-2016	1	bye - death of Mohan Singh
Pramod Tiwari	INC	14-Dec-2013	02-Apr-2018	1	bye - disqualification of Rasheed Masood
Alok Tiwari	SP	19-Jun-2012	02-Apr-2018	1	bye - resignation of Brij Bhushan Tiwari
Arvind Kumar Singh	SP	20-Apr-2012	04-Jul-2016	1	bye - resignation of Rasheed Masood
Jaya Bachchan	SP	03-Apr-2012	02-Apr-2018	3	
Naresh Chandra Agrawal	SP	03-Apr-2012	02-Apr-2018	2	
Munvvar Saleem	SP	03-Apr-2012	02-Apr-2018	1	
Darshan Singh Yadav	SP	03-Apr-2012	02-Apr-2018	1	
Kiranmay Nanda	SP	03-Apr-2012	02-Apr-2018	1	
Brij Bhushan Tiwari	SP	03-Apr-2012	25-Apr-2012	2	death
Mayawati	BSP	03-Apr-2012	20-Jul-2017	3	resigned
Munquad Ali	BSP	03-Apr-2012	02-Apr-2018	2	
Vinay Katiyar	BJP	03-Apr-2012	02-Apr-2018	1	
Rasheed Masood	INC	03-Apr-2012	19-Sep-2013	3	disqualified
Pramod Kureel	BSP	09-Jul-2010	02-Apr-2012	1	bye - death of Virendra Bhatia
Jugal Kishore	BSP	05-Jul-2010	04-Jul-2016	1	
Narendra Kashyap	BSP	05-Jul-2010	04-Jul-2016	1	
Satish Chandra Mishra	BSP	05-Jul-2010	04-Jul-2016	2	
Rajpal Saini	BSP	05-Jul-2010	04-Jul-2016	1	
Ambeth Rajan	BSP	05-Jul-2010	04-Jul-2016	2	
Salim Ansari	BSP	05-Jul-2010	04-Jul-2016	1	
S. P. Singh Baghel	BSP	05-Jul-2010	12-Mar-2014	1	resigned
Rasheed Masood	SP	05-Jul-2010	09-Mar-2012	2	resigned
Mohan Singh	SP	05-Jul-2010	22-Sep-2013	1	death
Mukhtar Abbas Naqvi	BJP	05-Jul-2010	04-Jul-2016	1	
Satish Sharma	INC	05-Jul-2010	04-Jul-2016	3	
Naresh Chandra Agrawal	BSP	19-Mar-2010	02-Apr-2012	1	bye - death of Janeshwar Mishra
Jai Prakash Rawat	BSP	04-Aug-2009	02-Apr-2012	1	bye - resignation of Balihari
Ganga Charan Rajput	BSP	19-Jun-2009	02-Apr-2012	1	bye - resignation of Banwari Lal Kanchhal
Shriram Pal	BSP	19-Jun-2009	04-Jul-2010	1	bye - resignation of Murli Manohar Joshi
Akhilesh Das Gupta	BSP	26-Nov-2008	25-Nov-2014	3	
Avtar Singh Karimpuri	BSP	26-Nov-2008	25-Nov-2014	1	
Brijlal Khabri	BSP	26-Nov-2008	25-Nov-2014	1	
Brajesh Pathak	BSP	26-Nov-2008	25-Nov-2014	1	
Rajaram	BSP	26-Nov-2008	25-Nov-2014	1	
Veer Singh	BSP	26-Nov-2008	25-Nov-2014	2	
Ram Gopal Yadav	SP	26-Nov-2008	25-Nov-2014	3	
Amar Singh	SP	26-Nov-2008	25-Nov-2014	3	
Kusum Rai	BJP	26-Nov-2008	25-Nov-2014	1	
Mohammed Adeeb	Ind	26-Nov-2008	25-Nov-2014	1	
Ambeth Rajan	BSP	26-Sep-2007	04-Jul-2010	1	bye - resignation of Mayawati
Brij Bhushan Tiwari	SP	06-Dec-2006	04-Jul-2010	1	bye - death of Lalit Suri
Amir Alam Khan	SP	13-Jun-2006	04-Jul-2010	1	bye - resignation of Anil Ambani
Jaya Bachchan	SP	12-Jun-2006	04-Jul-2010	2	bye - disqualification of herself
Veer Pal Singh Yadav	SP	03-Apr-2006	02-Apr-2012	1	
Mahendra Mohan	SP	03-Apr-2006	02-Apr-2012	1	
Janeshwar Mishra	SP	03-Apr-2006	22-Jan-2010	3	death
Banwari Lal Kanchhal	SP	03-Apr-2006	23-Apr-2009	1	resigned
Virendra Bhatia	SP	03-Apr-2006	24-May-2010	1	death
Balihari	BSP	03-Apr-2006	12-Jun-2009	1	resigned
Munquad Ali	BSP	03-Apr-2006	02-Apr-2012	1	
Kalraj Mishra	BJP	03-Apr-2006	21-Mar-2012	3	elected to Lucknow East Assembly
Vinay Katiyar	BJP	03-Apr-2006	02-Apr-2012	1	
Mahmood Madani	RLD	03-Apr-2006	02-Apr-2012	1	
Kamal Akhtar	SP	05-Jul-2004	04-Jul-2010	1	
Ram Narayan Sahu	SP	05-Jul-2004	04-Jul-2010	1	
Bhagwati Singh	SP	05-Jul-2004	04-Jul-2010	1	
Nand Kishore Yadav	SP	05-Jul-2004	04-Jul-2010	1	
Jaya Bachchan	SP	05-Jul-2004	13-Jul-2004	1	disqualified
Murli Manohar Joshi	BJP	05-Jul-2004	16-May-2009	2	elected to Varanasi Lok Sabha
Arun Shourie	BJP	05-Jul-2004	04-Jul-2010	2	
Mayawati	BSP	05-Jul-2004	05-Jul-2007	2	resigned
Satish Chandra Mishra	BSP	05-Jul-2004	04-Jul-2010	1	
Anil Ambani	Ind	05-Jul-2004	29-Mar-2006	1	resigned
Lalit Suri	Ind	05-Jul-2004	10-Oct-2006	2	death
Abu Azmi	SP	26-Nov-2002	25-Nov-2008	1	
Shahid Siddiqui	SP	26-Nov-2002	25-Nov-2008	1	
Uday Pratap Singh	SP	26-Nov-2002	25-Nov-2008	1	
Amar Singh	SP	26-Nov-2002	25-Nov-2008	2	
Gandhi Azad	BSP	26-Nov-2002	25-Nov-2008	2	
Veer Singh	BSP	26-Nov-2002	25-Nov-2008	1	
Isham Singh	BSP	26-Nov-2002	04-Jul-2008	1	disqualified
Rajnath Singh	BJP	26-Nov-2002	25-Nov-2008	3	
Mukhtar Abbas Naqvi	BJP	26-Nov-2002	25-Nov-2008	1	
Akhilesh Das Gupta	INC	26-Nov-2002	08-May-2008	2	resigned
Lalit Suri	Ind	14-Nov-2002	04-Jul-2004	1	bye - resignation of T. N. Chaturvedi
Sunil Shastri	BJP	22-May-2002	25-Nov-2002	1	bye - resignation of Azam Khan
Kalraj Mishra	BJP	07-Jun-2001	02-Apr-2006	2	bye - resignation of Rajnath Singh
Shyam Lal	BJP	16-Feb-2001	25-Nov-2002	1	bye - death of Chunnilal Chaudhary
Rajnath Singh	BJP	03-Apr-2000	19-April-2001	2	resigned
Sushma Swaraj	BJP	03-Apr-2000	03-Apr-2006	1	RS member from Uttarakhand 9-Nov-2000 onwards
R. B. S. Varma	BJP	03-Apr-2000	02-Apr-2006	2	
Balbir Punj	BJP	03-Apr-2000	02-Apr-2006	1	
Ram Nath Kovind	BJP	03-Apr-2000	02-Apr-2006	2	
Rajeev Shukla	ABLTC	03-Apr-2000	02-Apr-2006	1	
Dara Singh Chauhan	SP	03-Apr-2000	02-Apr-2006	2	
Sakshi Maharaj	SP	03-Apr-2000	21-Mar-2006	1	
Janeshwar Mishra	SP	03-Apr-2000	02-Apr-2006	2	
Ghanshyam Chandra Kharwar	BSP	03-Apr-2000	02-Apr-2006	1	
M. M. Agarwal	Ind	03-Apr-2000	02-Apr-2006	1	
T. N. Chaturvedi	BJP	05-Jul-1998	20-Aug-2002	2	appointed as Governor of Karnataka
Dinanath Mishra	BJP	05-Jul-1998	04-Jul-2004	1	
Arun Shourie	BJP	05-Jul-1998	04-Jul-2004	1	
B. P. Singhal	BJP	05-Jul-1998	04-Jul-2004	1	
Sangh Priya Gautam	BJP	05-Jul-1998	04-Jul-2004	2	RS member from Uttarakhand 9-Nov-2000 onwards
Munawwar Hasan	SP	05-Jul-1998	27-Jan-2004	1	elected to Muzaffarnagar Lok Sabha
Ram Gopal Yadav	SP	05-Jul-1998	13-May-2004	2	elected to Sambhal Lok Sabha
Rama Shanker Kaushik	SP	05-Jul-1998	04-Jul-2004	1	
Kanshi Ram	BSP	05-Jul-1998	04-Jul-2004	1	
Khan Ghufran Zahidi	INC	05-Jul-1998	04-Jul-2004	1	
D. P. Yadav	Ind	05-Jul-1998	04-Jul-2004	1	
Akhtar Hasan Rizvi	Ind	05-Jul-1998	04-Jul-2004	1	
Dara Singh Chauhan	BSP	30-Nov-1996	02-Apr-2000	1	bye - resignation of Mayawati
Ahmed Wasim	Ind	30-Nov-1996	04-Jul-1998	1	bye - resignation of Mufti Mohammad Sayeed
Khan Ghufran Zahidi	INC	30-Nov-1996	04-Jul-1998	1	bye - resignation of Murli Manohar Joshi
Chunnilal Chaudhary	BJP	26-Nov-1996	03-Dec-2000	1	death
Narendra Mohan	BJP	26-Nov-1996	20-Sep-2002	1	death
Devi Prasad Singh	BJP	26-Nov-1996	25-Nov-2002	1	
Rajnath Singh Surya	BJP	26-Nov-1996	25-Nov-2002	1	
Manohar Kant Dhyani	BJP	26-Nov-1996	25-Nov-2002	1	RS member from Uttarakhand 9-Nov-2000 onwards
Azam Khan	SP	26-Nov-1996	09-Mar-2002	1	elected to Rampur Assembly
Amar Singh	SP	26-Nov-1996	25-Nov-2002	1	
Gandhi Azad	BSP	26-Nov-1996	25-Nov-2002	1	
R. N. Arya	BSP	26-Nov-1996	25-Nov-2002	1	
Akhilesh Das Gupta	INC	26-Nov-1996	25-Nov-2002	1	
Balwant Singh Ramoowalia	Ind	26-Nov-1996	25-Nov-2002	1	
Rajnath Singh	BJP	03-Apr-1994	02-Apr-2000	1	
Malti Sharma	BJP	03-Apr-1994	02-Apr-2000	1	
R. B. S. Varma	BJP	03-Apr-1994	02-Apr-2000	1	
Ranbir Singh Latayan	BJP	03-Apr-1994	02-Apr-2000	1	
Ram Nath Kovind	BJP	03-Apr-1994	02-Apr-2000	1	
Ish Dutt Yadav	SP	03-Apr-1994	19-Sep-1999	2	death
Janeshwar Mishra	SP	03-Apr-1994	02-Apr-2000	1	
Raj Babbar	SP	03-Apr-1994	06-Oct-1999	1	elected to Agra Lok Sabha
Mayawati	BSP	03-Apr-1994	25-Oct-1996	1	elected to Harora Assembly
Jitendra Prasada	INC	03-Apr-1994	07-Oct-1999	1	elected to Shahjahanpur Lok Sabha
Jayant Kumar Malhotra	Ind	03-Apr-1994	02-Apr-2000	1	
Sanjay Dalmia	SP	03-Feb-1994	04-Jul-1998	1	bye - death of Baldev Prakash
Murli Manohar Joshi	BJP	05-Jul-1992	11-May-1996	1	elected to Allahabad Lok Sabha
T. N. Chaturvedi	BJP	05-Jul-1992	04-Jul-1998	1	
Baldev Prakash	BJP	05-Jul-1992	17-Nov-1992	1	death
Ishwar Chandra Gupta	BJP	05-Jul-1992	04-Jul-1998	1	
Ram Ratan Ram	BJP	05-Jul-1992	04-Jul-1998	1	
Vishnu Kant Shastri	BJP	05-Jul-1992	04-Jul-1998	1	
Naunihal Singh	BJP	05-Jul-1992	04-Jul-1998	1	
Sompal Shastri	JD	05-Jul-1992	27-Dec-1997	1	resigned
Mufti Mohammad Sayeed	JD	05-Jul-1992	29-Jul-1996	2	resigned
Syed Sibtey Razi	INC	05-Jul-1992	04-Jul-1998	3	
Ram Gopal Yadav	JP	05-Jul-1992	04-Jul-1998	1	
Mohammad Masood Khan	Ind	05-Jul-1992	04-Jul-1998	1	
Z.A. Ahmed	CPI	23-Aug-1990	02-Apr-1994	4	bye - death of Mohammed Amin Ansari
Sanjaya Sinh	JD	13-Jul-1990	02-Apr-1996	1	bye - resignation of Virendra Verma
M. S. Gurupadaswamy	JD	10-Apr-1990	04-Jul-1992	1	bye - resignation of Kalpnath Rai
Satya Prakash Malaviya	JD	03-Apr-1990	02-Apr-1996	2	
Anantram Jaiswal	JD	03-Apr-1990	02-Apr-1996	1	
Virendra Verma	JD	03-Apr-1990	14-Jun-1990	2	appointed as Governor of Punjab
Harmohan Singh Yadav	JD	03-Apr-1990	02-Apr-1996	1	
Meem Afzal	JD	03-Apr-1990	02-Apr-1996	1	
Obaidullah Khan Azmi	INC	03-Apr-1990	02-Apr-1996	1	
Kedar Nath Singh	INC	03-Apr-1990	02-Apr-1996	1	
Makhan Lal Fotedar	INC	03-Apr-1990	02-Apr-1996	2	
Balram Singh Yadav	INC	03-Apr-1990	02-Apr-1996	1	
Jagdish Prasad Mathur	BJP	03-Apr-1990	02-Apr-1996	2	
Sangh Priya Gautam	BJP	03-Apr-1990	02-Apr-1996	1	
Raja Ramanna	JD	23-Mar-1990	04-Jul-1992	1	bye - resignation of Rasheed Masood
Rajmohan Gandhi	JD	23-Mar-1990	04-Jul-1992	1	bye - resignation of Sharad Yadav
Sompal Shastri	JD	23-Mar-1990	04-Jul-1992	1	bye - resignation of Ajit Singh
Alia Zuberi	INC	11-Oct-1989	04-Jul-1992	1	bye - resignation of Satya Pal Malik
Mohan Singh	INC	01-Aug-1989	02-Apr-1990	1	bye- death of Vir Bahadur Singh
Ram Naresh Yadav	INC	20-Jun-1989	02-Apr-1994	2	bye - resignation by himself
Syed Sibtey Razi	INC	06-Dec-1988	04-Jul-1992	2	bye - resignation of Narayan Datt Tiwari
Vir Bahadur Singh	INC	22-Nov-1988	30-May-1989	1	bye - resignation of Arun Singh death
Mohammed Amin Ansari	INC	03-Apr-1988	14-Jul-1990	1	death
Hari Singh Chowdhary	INC	03-Apr-1988	02-Apr-1994	1	
Kailashpati	INC	03-Apr-1988	02-Apr-1994	2	
Asad Madani	INC	03-Apr-1988	02-Apr-1994	3	
Shiv Pratap Mishra	INC	03-Apr-1988	02-Apr-1994	1	
Satya Bahin	INC	03-Apr-1988	02-Apr-1994	1	
Shanti Tyagi	INC	03-Apr-1988	02-Apr-1994	2	
Ram Naresh Yadav	LKD	03-Apr-1988	12-Apr-1989	1	resigned
Ish Dutt Yadav	LKD	03-Apr-1988	02-Apr-1994	1	
Subramanian Swamy	JP	03-Apr-1988	02-Apr-1994	2	
Anand Prakash Gautam	Ind	03-Apr-1988	02-Apr-1994	2	
Ratnakar Pandey	INC	05-Jul-1986	04-Jul-1992	1	
Rudra Pratap Singh	INC	05-Jul-1986	04-Jul-1992	2	
Ram Sewak Chowdhary	INC	05-Jul-1986	04-Jul-1992	2	
Bekal Utsahi	INC	05-Jul-1986	04-Jul-1992	1	
Kapil Verma	INC	05-Jul-1986	04-Jul-1992	2	
Kalpnath Rai	INC	05-Jul-1986	27-Nov-1989	3	elected to Ghosi Lok Sabha
Satya Pal Malik	INC	05-Jul-1986	14-Sep-1989	1	resigned
Narayan Datt Tiwari	INC	05-Jul-1986	23-Oct-1988	2	resigned
Ajit Singh	LKD	05-Jul-1986	27-Nov-1989	1	elected to Baghpat Lok Sabha
Sharad Yadav	LKD	05-Jul-1986	27-Nov-1989	1	elected to Badaun Lok Sabha
Ashok Nath Verma	LKD	05-Jul-1986	04-Jul-1992	1	
Rasheed Masood	JP	05-Jul-1986	27-Nov-1989	1	elected to Saharanpur Lok Sabha
Narayan Datt Tiwari	INC	02-Dec-1985	04-Jul-1986	1	bye - resignation of Syed Sibtey Razi
Makhan Lal Fotedar	INC	09-May-1985	02-Apr-1990	1	bye - resignation of Narendra Singh
Achchhey Lal Balmik	INC	31-Jan-1985	04-Jul-1986	1	bye - resignation of Dharamvir Singh Tyagi
Anand Prakash Gautam	INC	31-Jan-1985	04-Jul-1986	1	bye - resignation of Khurshed Alam Khan
Kailashpati	INC	28-Jan-1985	02-Apr-1988	1	bye - resignation of Shyam Lal Yadav
Sushila Rohatgi	INC	28-Jan-1985	02-Apr-1988	1	bye - resignation of Sankata Prasad
Kapil Verma	INC	24-Jan-1985	04-Jul-1986	1	bye - resignation of Ram Pujan Patel
Kamalapati Tripathi	INC	19-Jan-1985	04-Jul-1986	3	bye - death of Pyare Lal Kureel
Sohan Lal Dhusiya	INC	03-Apr-1984	02-Apr-1990	1	
Mohammad Hashim Kidwai	INC	03-Apr-1984	02-Apr-1990	1	
Sheo Kumar Mishra	INC	03-Apr-1984	02-Apr-1990	1	
Govind Das Richharia	INC	03-Apr-1984	02-Apr-1990	1	
Bir Bhadra Pratap Singh	INC	03-Apr-1984	02-Apr-1990	1	
P. N. Sukul	INC	03-Apr-1984	02-Apr-1990	2	
Ram Chandra Vikal	INC	03-Apr-1984	02-Apr-1990	1	
Narendra Singh	INC	03-Apr-1984	04-Feb-1985	3	resigned
Arun Singh	INC	03-Apr-1984	17-Aug-1988	1	resigned
Virendra Verma	LKD	03-Apr-1984	02-Apr-1990	1	
Satya Prakash Malaviya	LKD	03-Apr-1984	02-Apr-1990	1	
Vishwanath Pratap Singh	INC	23-Jul-1985	02-Apr-1988	1	bye - resignation of Bishambhar Nath Pande
Krishna Kaul	INC	03-Apr-1982	02-Apr-1988	1	
Hashim Raza Allahabadi Abdi	INC	03-Apr-1982	02-Apr-1988	1	
Shyam Lal Yadav	INC	03-Apr-1982	29-Dec-1984	3	elected to Varanasi Lok Sabha
Sankata Prasad	INC	03-Apr-1982	29-Dec-1984	1	elected to Misrikh Lok Sabha
Ghanshyam Singh	INC	03-Apr-1982	02-Apr-1988	1	
Sukhdev Prasad	INC	03-Apr-1982	16-Feb-1988	3	
Shanti Tyagi	INC	03-Apr-1982	02-Apr-1988	1	
Krishnanand Joshi	INC	03-Apr-1982	02-Apr-1988	2	
Bishambhar Nath Pande	INC	03-Apr-1982	29-Jun-1983	2	appointed as Governor of Odisha
Ram Naresh Kushwaha	LKD	03-Apr-1982	02-Apr-1988	1	
J. P. Goyal	LKD	03-Apr-1982	02-Apr-1988	1	
Ram Pujan Patel	INC	16-Sep-1981	29-Dec-1984	1	bye - resignation of Mustafa Rashid Shervani elected to Phulpur Lok Sabha
Shivlal Balmiki	INC	16-Sep-1981	02-Apr-1982	1	bye - resignation of Prakash Mehrotra
Sudhakar Pandey	INC	05-Jul-1980	04-Jul-1986	1	
Rudra Pratap Singh	INC	05-Jul-1980	04-Jul-1986	1	
Ram Sewak Chowdhary	INC	05-Jul-1980	04-Jul-1986	1	
Asad Madani	INC	05-Jul-1980	04-Jul-1986	2	
Kalpnath Rai	INC	05-Jul-1980	04-Jul-1986	2	
Syed Sibtey Razi	INC	05-Jul-1980	14-May-1985	1	
Dharmavir	INC	05-Jul-1980	22-Dec-1984	1	death
Khurshed Alam Khan	INC	05-Jul-1980	06-Dec-1984	2	elected to Farrukhabad Lok Sabha
Pyare Lal Kureel	INC	05-Jul-1980	27-Dec-1984	3	death
Mustafa Rashid Shervani	INC	05-Jul-1980	08-Apr-1981	3	resigned
Satya Pal Malik	LKD	05-Jul-1980	04-Jul-1986	1	
Syed Ahmad Hashmi	LKD	05-Jul-1980	04-Jul-1986	2	
P. N. Sukul	INC	05-Jul-1980	02-Apr-1984	1	bye - resignation of Kamalapati Tripathi
Narsingh Narain Pandey	INC	30-Jun-1980	02-Apr-1982	1	bye - resignation of Ghayoor Ali Khan
Dinesh Singh	INC	30-Jun-1980	02-Apr-1982	2	bye - death of Triloki Singh
Narendra Singh	JP	03-Apr-1978	02-Apr-1984	2	
Rameshwar Singh	JP	03-Apr-1978	02-Apr-1984	1	
Abdul Rehman Sheikh	JP	03-Apr-1978	02-Apr-1984	1	
M. M. S. Siddhu	JP	03-Apr-1978	02-Apr-1984	3	
Surendra Mohan	JP	03-Apr-1978	02-Apr-1984	1	
G. C. Bhattacharya	JP	03-Apr-1978	02-Apr-1984	1	
Lakhan Singh	BJS	03-Apr-1978	02-Apr-1984	1	
Jagdish Prasad Mathur	BJS	03-Apr-1978	02-Apr-1984	1	
Kalraj Mishra	BJS	03-Apr-1978	02-Apr-1984	1	
Kamalapati Tripathi	INC	03-Apr-1978	08-Jan-1980	2	elected to Varanasi Lok Sabha
Krishna Chandra Pant	INC	03-Apr-1978	02-Apr-1984	1	
Shiv Nandan Singh	JP	20-Mar-1978	02-Apr-1980	1	bye - death of Prakash Vir Shastri
M. M. S. Sidhu	JP	18-Jul-1977	02-Apr-1978	2	bye - resignation of Banarasi Das
Dinesh Singh	JP	14-Jul-1977	02-Apr-1980	1	bye - resignation of Chandra Shekhar
Shanti Bhushan	JP	14-Jul-1977	02-Apr-1980	1	bye - resignation of Raj Narain
Prem Manohar	JP	14-Jul-1977	02-Apr-1980	2	bye - resignation of Godey Murahari
Kunwar Bahadur Asthana	JP	14-Jul-1977	02-Apr-1980	1	bye - resignation of Subramanian Swamy
Narendra Singh	JP	14-Jul-1977	02-Apr-1978	1	bye - resignation of Om Prakash Tyagi
Krishna Nand Joshi	INC	03-Apr-1976	02-Apr-1982	1	
Bishambhar Nath Pande	INC	03-Apr-1976	02-Apr-1982	1	
Shyamlal Yadav	INC	03-Apr-1976	02-Apr-1982	2	
Bhagwan Din	INC	03-Apr-1976	02-Apr-1982	1	
Hamida Habibullah	INC	03-Apr-1976	02-Apr-1982	1	
Suresh Narain Mulla	INC	03-Apr-1976	02-Apr-1982	1	
Prakash Mehrotra	INC	03-Apr-1976	09-Aug-1981	1	appointed as Governor of Assam
Triloki Singh	INC	03-Apr-1976	29-Jan-1980	3	death
Nageshwar Prasad Shahi	BKD	03-Apr-1976	02-Apr-1982	2	
Ghayoor Ali Khan	BKD	03-Apr-1976	08-Jan-1980	1	elected to Muzaffarnagar Lok Sabha
Bhanu Pratap Singh	BKD	03-Apr-1976	02-Apr-1982	1	
Sunder Singh Bhandari	BJS	03-Apr-1976	02-Apr-1982	1	
Devendra Nath Dwivedi	INC	03-Apr-1974	02-Apr-1980	1	
Kalpnath Rai	INC	03-Apr-1974	02-Apr-1980	1	
Shiv Dayal Singh Chaurasia	INC	03-Apr-1974	02-Apr-1980	1	
Pyare Lal Kureel	INC	03-Apr-1974	02-Apr-1980	2	
Syed Ahmad Hashmi	INC	03-Apr-1974	02-Apr-1980	1	
Jagbir Singh	BKD	03-Apr-1974	02-Apr-1980	1	
Raj Narain	BKD	03-Apr-1974	21-Mar-1977	2	elected to Raebareli Lok Sabha
Godey Murahari	BKD	03-Apr-1974	20-Mar-1977	1	elected to Vijayawada Lok Sabha
Mahadeo Prasad Varma	BKD	03-Apr-1974	02-Apr-1980	1	
Subramanian Swamy	BJS	03-Apr-1974	15-Nov-1976	1	elected to Mumbai North East Lok Sabha
Prakash Vir Shastri	BJS	03-Apr-1974	23-Nov-1977	1	death
Chandra Shekhar	Ind	03-Apr-1974	22-Mar-1977	3	elected to Ballia Lok Sabha
Kamalapati Tripathi	INC	11-Dec-1973	02-Apr-1978	1	bye - death of V. R. Mohan
Harsh Deo Malaviya	INC	03-Apr-1972	02-Apr-1978	1	
Yashpal Kapur	INC	03-Apr-1972	02-Apr-1978	1	
Anand Narain Mulla	INC	03-Apr-1972	02-Apr-1978	1	
V. B. Singh	INC	03-Apr-1972	02-Apr-1978	1	
Sukhdev Prasad	INC	03-Apr-1972	02-Apr-1978	2	
Saiyid Nurul Hasan	INC	03-Apr-1972	02-Apr-1978	2	
Mohan Singh Oberoi	BKD	03-Apr-1972	02-Apr-1978	2	
Om Prakash Tyagi	BJS	03-Apr-1972	21-Mar-1977	1	elected to Bahraich Lok Sabha
Banarasi Das	INC(O)	03-Apr-1972	28-Jun-1977	1	elected to Khurja Assembly
Z.A. Ahmed	CPI	03-Apr-1972	02-Apr-1978	3	
V. R. Mohan	Ind	03-Apr-1972	28-Jan-1973	1	death
Saiyid Nurul Hasan	INC	11-Nov-1971	02-Apr-1972	1	bye - resignation of Jogendra Singh
Shiv Swaroop Singh	INC	31-Dec-1970	02-Apr-1972	1	bye -
Uma Shankar Dikshit	INC	03-Apr-1970	10-Jan-1976	1	
Mahavir Prasad Shukla	INC	03-Apr-1970	02-Apr-1976	3	
Triloki Singh	INC	03-Apr-1970	02-Apr-1976	2	
Inder Singh	INC	03-Apr-1970	02-Apr-1976	1	
Shyam Lal Yadav	INC	03-Apr-1970	02-Apr-1976	1	
Kalyan Chand	INC	03-Apr-1970	02-Apr-1976	1	
Mahavir Tyagi	INC(O)	03-Apr-1970	02-Apr-1976	1	
Tribhuvan Narain Singh	INC(O)	03-Apr-1970	02-Apr-1976	2	
Nageshwar Prasad Shahi	BKD	03-Apr-1970	02-Apr-1976	1	
Dattopant Thengadi	BJS	03-Apr-1970	02-Apr-1976	2	
Mohan Lal Gautam	INC(O)	14-Aug-1969	02-Apr-1972	1	bye - death of Kunj Bihari Lal Rathi
Jagdish Chandra Dikshit	INC	23-Sep-1969	02-Apr-1970	1	bye - death of Sardar Ram Singh
Ajit Prasad Jain	INC	03-Apr-1968	02-Apr-1974	1	
Chandra Shekhar	INC	03-Apr-1968	02-Apr-1974	2	
Asad Madani	INC	03-Apr-1968	02-Apr-1974	1	
Chandra Dutt Pande	INC	03-Apr-1968	02-Apr-1974	2	
Prem Manohar	BJS	03-Apr-1968	02-Apr-1974	1	
Pitamber Das	BJS	03-Apr-1968	02-Apr-1974	1	
Man Singh Varma	BJS	03-Apr-1968	02-Apr-1974	1	
Shyam Dhar Mishra	INC(O)	03-Apr-1968	02-Apr-1974	3	
Ganeshi Lal Chaudhary	INC(O)	03-Apr-1968	02-Apr-1974	1	
Godey Murahari	SSP	03-Apr-1968	02-Apr-1974	2	
Prithwi Nath	BKD	03-Apr-1968	02-Apr-1974	1	
Sitaram Jaipuria	Ind	03-Apr-1968	02-Apr-1974	2	
Bindumati Devi	INC(O)	09-Jul-1967	02-Apr-1972	1	bye - resignation of Gopal Swarup Pathak
Srikrishna Dutt Paliwal	INC	27-Apr-1967	02-Apr-1968	1	bye - resignation of Atal Bihari Vajpayee
Triloki Singh	INC	27-Apr-1967	02-Apr-1968	1	bye - resignation of Hafiz Mohamad Ibrahim
Tarkeshwar Pandey	INC	30-Jul-1966	02-Apr-1970	1	bye - death of Faridul Haq Ansari
Gopal Swarup Pathak	INC	03-Apr-1966	13-May-1967	2	appointed as Governor of Karnataka
Hira Vallabh Tripathi	INC	03-Apr-1966	02-Apr-1972	2	
Arjun Arora	INC	03-Apr-1966	02-Apr-1972	2	
Jogesh Chandra Chatterjee	INC	03-Apr-1966	02-Apr-1972	3	
Jogendra Singh	INC	03-Apr-1966	20-Sep-1971	2	appointed as Governor of Odisha
Sukhdev Prasad	INC	03-Apr-1966	02-Apr-1972	1	
Mustafa Rashid Shervani	INC	03-Apr-1966	02-Apr-1972	1	
Hayatullah Ansari	INC	03-Apr-1966	02-Apr-1972	1	
Kunj Bihari Lal Rathi	BJS	03-Apr-1966	13-Jul-1968	1	death
Raj Narain	SOC	03-Apr-1966	02-Apr-1972	1	
Z.A. Ahmed	CPI	03-Apr-1966	02-Apr-1972	2	
Tribhuvan Narain Singh	INC	08-Jan-1965	02-Apr-1970	1	bye - resignation of Tarkeshwar Pandey
Uma Shankar Dikshit	INC	03-Apr-1964	02-Apr-1970	2	
Tarkeshwar Pandey	INC	03-Apr-1964	15-Dec-1964	3	resigned
Mahavir Prasad Shukla	INC	03-Apr-1964	02-Apr-1970	2	
Sham Sundar Narain Tankha	INC	03-Apr-1964	02-Apr-1970	3	
Albert Crozier Gilbert	INC	03-Apr-1964	02-Apr-1970	2	
Bashir Hussain Zaidi	INC	03-Apr-1964	02-Apr-1970	2	
Dattopant Thengadi	BJS	03-Apr-1964	02-Apr-1970	1	
Sardar Ram Singh	SWA	03-Apr-1964	20-Aug-1969	1	death
Sarla Bhadauria	SSP	03-Apr-1964	02-Apr-1970	1	
Faridul Haq Ansari	PSP	03-Apr-1964	04-Apr-1966	2	death
Mahabir Prasad Bhargava	Ind	03-Apr-1964	02-Apr-1970	3	
Shyam Kumari Khan	INC	11-Dec-1963	02-Apr-1968	1	bye - death of Uma Nehru
Liladhar Asthana	INC	03-Apr-1962	02-Apr-1968	1	
Dharam Prakash	INC	03-Apr-1962	02-Apr-1968	2	
Uma Nehru	INC	03-Apr-1962	28-Aug-1963	1	death
Chandra Dutt Pande	INC	03-Apr-1962	02-Apr-1968	1	
Anis Kidwai	INC	03-Apr-1962	02-Apr-1968	2	
Prakash Narain Sapru	INC	03-Apr-1962	02-Apr-1968	2	
Hafiz Mohamad Ibrahim	INC	03-Apr-1962	04-May-1964	2	appointed as Governor of Punjab
M. M. S. Sidhu	INC	03-Apr-1962	02-Apr-1968	1	
Atal Bihari Vajpayee	BJS	03-Apr-1962	25-Feb-1967	1	elected to Balrampur Lok Sabha
Chandra Shekhar	PSP	03-Apr-1962	02-Apr-1968	1	
Mohan Singh Oberoi	Ind	03-Apr-1962	02-Apr-1968	1	
Sitaram Jaipuria	Ind	03-Apr-1962	02-Apr-1968	1	
Godey Murahari	Ind	03-Apr-1962	02-Apr-1968	1	

Name (Alphabetical)	Party	Date of Appointment	Date of Retirement/Resignation	Term
A Dharam Dass	Indian National Congress	03/04/1952	02/04/1958	1
A Dharam Dass	Indian National Congress	03/04/1958	27/07/1960	2
Ahmad Said Khan	Indian National Congress	03-04-1952	02-04-1954	1
Ahmad Said Khan	Indian National Congress	03-04-1954	02-04-1960	2
Ajit Pratap Singh	Others	03-04-1958	28-02-1962	1
Albert Crozier Gilbert	Indian National Congress	10/11/1960	02/04/1970	1
Albert Crozier Gilbert	Indian National Congress	03/04/1964	02/04/1970	2
Amar Nath Agrawal	Indian National Congress	03/04/1952	02/04/1954	1
Amar Nath Agrawal	Indian National Congress	03/04/1954	02/04/1960	2
Amolakh Chand	Indian National Congress	03/04/1952	02/04/1954	1
Amolakh Chand	Indian National Congress	03/04/1954	02/04/1960	2
Anis Kidwai	Indian National Congress	03-04-1956	02-04-1962	1
Anis Kidwai	Indian National Congress	03-04-1962	02-04-1968	2
Arjun Arora	Indian National Congress	01/08/1960	02/04/1966	1
Arjun Arora	Indian National Congress	03/04/1966	02/04/1972	2
Balkrishna Sharma	Indian National Congress	13-12-1956	29-04-1960	1
Bapu Gopinath Singh	Indian National Congress	03-04-1952	02-04-1954	1
Bapu Gopinath Singh	Indian National Congress	03-04-1954	02-04-1960	2
Bashir Hussain Zaidi	Indian National Congress	11-12-1963	02-04-1964	1
Bashir Hussain Zaidi	Indian National Congress	03-04-1964	02-04-1970	2
Begum Rasul Aizaz	Indian National Congress	03/04/1952	02/04/1956	1
Bhagwat Narain Bhargava	Others	03/04/1960	02/04/1966	1
B K Mukherjee	Indian National Congress	03-04-1952	02-04-1958	1
Braj Bihari Sharma	Indian National Congress	03-04-1952	02-04-1954	1
Braj Bihari Sharma	Indian National Congress	03-04-1954	02-04-1960	2
Chandravati Lakhanpal	Indian National Congress	03-04-1952	02-04-1956	1
Chandravati Lakhanpal	Indian National Congress	03-04-1956	02-04-1962	2
Dr Dharam Prakash	Indian National Congress	09/08/1958	02/04/1962	1
Dr Dharam Prakash	Indian National Congress	03/04/1962	02/04/1968	2
Faridul Haq Ansari	Others	03/04/1958	02/04/1964	1
Faridul Haq Ansari	Others	03/04/1964	04/04/1966	2
Gopal Swarup Pathak	Indian National Congress	03-04-1960	02-04-1966	1
Gopal Swarup Pathak	Indian National Congress	03-04-1966	13-05-1967	2
Govind Ballabh Pant	Indian National Congress	02-03-1955	02-04-1958	1
Govind Ballabh Pant	Indian National Congress	03-04-1958	07-03-1961	2
Hafiz Mohd Ibrahim	Indian National Congress	18-08-1958	02-04-1962	1
Hafiz Mohd Ibrahim	Indian National Congress	03-04-1962	04-05-1964	2
Har Prasad Saksena	Indian National Congress	03-04-1952	02-04-1956	1
Har Prasad Saksena	Indian National Congress	03-04-1956	02-04-1962	2
Hira Vallabha Tripathi	Indian National Congress	20-04-1957	02-04-1960	1
Hira Vallabha Tripathi	Indian National Congress	03-04-1960	02-04-1966	2
Hira Vallabha Tripathi	Indian National Congress	03-04-1966	02-04-1972	3
Hirdey Nath Kunzru	Independent	03-04-1952	02-04-1956	1
Hirdey Nath Kunzru	Independent	03-04-1956	02-04-1962	2
Hussain Akhtar	Indian National Congress	03/04/1952	02/04/1956	1
Hussain Akhtar	Indian National Congress	03/04/1956	02/04/1962	2
Indira Gandhi	Indian National Congress	26/08/1964	23/02/1967	1
Indra Vidyavachaspati	Indian National Congress	03-04-1952	02-04-1958	1
Jagannath Prasad Agrawal	Indian National Congress	03/04/1952	02/04/1958	1
Jagannath Prasad Agrawal	Indian National Congress	03/04/1958	02/04/1964	2
J P Srivastava	Indian National Congress	03-04-1952	14-12-1954	1
Jashaud Singh Bisht	Indian National Congress	03/04/1952	02/04/1956	1
Jashaud Singh Bisht	Indian National Congress	03/04/1956	02/04/1962	2
Jaspat Roy Kapoor	Indian National Congress	03-04-1952	02-04-1956	1
Jaspat Roy Kapoor	Indian National Congress	03-04-1956	02-04-1962	2
Jawaharlal Rohatgi	Indian National Congress	19-04-1962	02-04-1964	1
Jogendra Singh	Indian National Congress	11-12-1963	02-04-1966	1
Jogendra Singh	Indian National Congress	03-04-1966	20-09-1971	2
Jogesh Chandra Chatterjee	Indian National Congress	03/04/1956	02/04/1960	1
Jogesh Chandra Chatterjee	Indian National Congress	03/04/1960	02/04/1966	2
Jogesh Chandra Chatterjee	Indian National Congress	03/04/1966	28/04/1969	3
Krishna Chandra	Indian National Congress	19-04-1962	02-04-1964	1
Lal Bahadur Shastri	Indian National Congress	03-04-1952	02-04-1954	1
Lal Bahadur Shastri	Indian National Congress	03-04-1954	13-03-1957	2
Mahavir Prasad Bhargava	Indian National Congress	13/12/1956	02/04/1958	1
Mahavir Prasad Bhargava	Indian National Congress	03/04/1958	02/04/1964	2
Mahavir Prasad Bhargava	Indian National Congress	03/04/1964	02/04/1970	3
Mahavir Prasad Shukla	Indian National Congress	19-04-1962	02-04-1964	1
Mahavir Prasad Shukla	Indian National Congress	03-04-1964	02-04-1970	2
Mahavir Prasad Shukla	Indian National Congress	03-04-1970	02-04-1976	3
M M Faruqi	Indian National Congress	03-04-1952	02-04-1954	1
M M Faruqi	Indian National Congress	03-04-1954	02-04-1960	2
Mukut Bihari Lal	Others	03-04-1960	02-04-1966	1
Murari Lal	Indian National Congress	03-04-1952	02-04-1956	1
Mushtafa Rashid Shervani	Indian National Congress	03-04-1960	02-04-1966	1
Mushtafa Rashid Shervani	Indian National Congress	03-04-1966	02-04-1972	2
Mushtafa Rashid Shervani	Indian National Congress	05-07-1980	08-04-1981	3
Nafisul Hasan	Others	03-04-1960	02-04-1966	1
Narendra Deva	Indian National Congress	03-04-1952	02-04-1954	1
Narendra Deva	Indian National Congress	03-04-1954	20-02-1956	2
Nawab Singh Chauhan	Indian National Congress	03/04/1952	02/04/1958	1
Nawab Singh Chauhan	Indian National Congress	03/04/1958	21/06/1963	2
Nawal Kishore	Indian National Congress	30-03-1970	19-04-1975	1
Pandit Algurai Shastri	Indian National Congress	13-12-1956	24-04-1958	1
Sham Sundar Narain Tankha	Indian National Congress	03-04-1952	02-04-1958	1
Sham Sundar Narain Tankha	Indian National Congress	03-04-1958	02-04-1964	2
Sham Sundar Narain Tankha	Indian National Congress	03-04-1964	02-04-1970	3
Phool Singh	Others	11-08-1969	27-09-1970	1
Piare Lall Kureel Talib	Others	03-04-1960	02-04-1966	1
Prakash Narayan Sapru	Indian National Congress	03-04-1956	02-04-1962	1
Prakash Narayan Sapru	Indian National Congress	03-04-1962	02-04-1968	2
Purushottam Das Tandon	Indian National Congress	20-04-1957	01-01-1960	1
Ram Gopal Gupta	Others	03/04/1960	02/04/1966	1
Ram Kripal Singh	Indian National Congress	03-04-1952	02-04-1956	1
Ram Kripal Singh	Indian National Congress	03-04-1956	14-03-1961	2
Ram Prasad Tamta	Indian National Congress	03-04-1952	02-04-1956	1
Ram Prasad Tamta	Indian National Congress	03-04-1956	01-05-1985	2
R C Gupta	Indian National Congress	03/04/1952	02/04/1954	1
R C Gupta	Indian National Congress	03/04/1954	02/04/1960	2
Sardar Ram Singh	Others	03-04-1964	20-08-1969	1
Satyacharan	Indian National Congress	03-04-1960	13-08-1963	1
Savitri Devi Nigam	Indian National Congress	03-04-1952	02-04-1956	1
Savitri Devi Nigam	Indian National Congress	03-04-1956	28-02-1962	2
Shanti Devi	Others	27-04-1961	02-04-1962	1
Shyam Dhar Misra	Indian National Congress	03-04-1952	02-04-1958	1
Shyam Dhar Misra	Indian National Congress	03-04-1958	01-03-1962	2
Sumat Prasad	Indian National Congress	03-04-1952	02-04-1954	1
Sumat Prasad	Indian National Congress	03-04-1954	12-03-1957	2
Tarkeshwar Pande	Indian National Congress	03-04-1952	02-04-1958	1
Tarkeshwar Pande	Indian National Congress	03-04-1958	02-04-1964	2
Tarkeshwar Pande	Indian National Congress	03-04-1964	15-12-1964	3
Tarkeshwar Pande	Indian National Congress	30-07-1966	02-04-1970	4
Thakur Das	Indian National Congress	03-04-1952	02-04-1958	1
Uma Shankar Dikshit	Indian National Congress	26/04/1961	02/04/1964	1
Uma Shankar Dikshit	Indian National Congress	03/04/1964	02/04/1970	2
Uma Shankar Dikshit	Indian National Congress	03/04/1970	10/01/1976	3
Dr Z A Ahmad	Communist Party of India	03/04/1958	19/03/1962	1
Dr Z A Ahmad	Communist Party of India	03/04/1966	02/04/1972	2
Dr Z A Ahmad	Communist Party of India	03/04/1972	02/04/1978	3
Dr Z A Ahmad	Communist Party of India	23/08/1990	02/04/1994	4
