= 1966 Rajya Sabha elections =

Rajya Sabha elections were held in 1966, to elect members of the Rajya Sabha, Indian Parliament's upper chamber.

== Elections ==
Elections were held in 1966 to elect members from various states. The list is incomplete.

=== Members elected ===
The following members are elected in the elections held in 1966. They are members for the term 1966-72 and retire in year 1972, except in case of the resignation or death before the term.

State - Member - Party

Rajya Sabha members for term 1966-1972
State	Member Name	Party	Remark
Andhra Pradesh	Kota Punnaiah	INC	
Andhra Pradesh	Akbar Ali Khan	INC	
Andhra Pradesh	Neelam Sanjiva Reddy	INC	24/02/1967
Andhra Pradesh	J C Nagi Reddy	INC	
Andhra Pradesh	M V Bhadram	CPI	
Assam	Dr Fakhruddin Ali Ahmed	INC	25/02/1967
Assam	Usha Barthakur	INC	
Assam	Purakayastha Mahitosh	INC	res 21/03/1972
Bihar	Bhupendra Narayan Mandal	SSP	
Bihar	Rajendra Pratap Sinha	INC	
Bihar	Sheel Bhadra Yajee	INC	
Bihar	Lalit Narayan Mishra	INC	02/02/1972 LS
Bihar	Shyamnandan Mishra	INC	11/03/1971 LS
Bihar	Pratul Chandra Mitra	INC	
Bihar	Raghunath Prasad Khaitan	INC	
Delhi	Shanta Vasisht	INC	
Gujarat	Biharilal N Antani	OTH	Dea. 16/09/1971
Gujarat	K S Chavda	INC	10/03/1971
Gujarat	Suresh J Desai	INC	
Gujarat	Kodardas K Shah	INC	res 22/05/1971
Gujarat	Pushpaben Mehta	CO	
Jammu & Kashmir	Gulam Nabi Untoo	INC	
Madras	N Ramakrishna Iyer	OTH	
Madras	T Chengalvaroyan	INC	
Madras	R T Parthasarathy	OTH	
Madras	G P Somasundaram	DMK	dea 25/06/1971
Madras	N R M Swamy	INC	
Madhya Pradesh	Nand Kishore Bhatt	INC	
Madhya Pradesh	Vidyawati Chaturvedi	INC	
Madhya Pradesh	A D Mani	IND	
Madhya Pradesh	Niranjan Varma	JS	
Maharashtra	B.D. Khobragade	RPI	
Maharashtra	Gulabrao Patil	INC	
Maharashtra	M C Chagla	INC	
Maharashtra	Vithalrao T Nagpure	INC	
Maharashtra	B S Savnekar	INC	
Maharashtra	Asoka Mehta	INC	res 26/02/1967 LS
Manipur	Sinam Krishnamohan Singh	INC	Dea 02/11/1964
Mysore	Violet Alva	INC	Dea 20/11/1969
Mysore	N Sri Ram Reddy	INC	
Mysore	M D Narayan	OTH	
Nominated	M Amjal Khan	NOM	Dea. 18/10/1969
Nominated	Dr Harivansh Rai Bachchan	NOM	
Nominated	Dr Dhananjay R Gadgil	NOM	res 31/08/1967
Nominated	M C Setalvad	NOM	
Orissa	Bhabani Charan Pattanayak	INC	
Orissa	Lokanath Misra	OTH	
Orissa	Banka Behary Das	OTH	res 04/04/1971
Orissa	M Haneef	OTH	dea 06/10/1967
Punjab	Sardar Raghbir Singh	INC	
Punjab	Neki Ram	INC	
Punjab	Sardar Narinder Singh Brar	AD	
Punjab	Salig Ram	INC	res 19/03/1972
Rajasthan	S S Bhandari	JAN	
Rajasthan	Dalpat Singh	OTH	
Rajasthan	Mangala Devi Talwar	INC	
Uttar Pradesh	Jogesh Chandra Chatterjee	INC	dea 28/04/1969
Uttar Pradesh	Dr Z A Ahmad	INC	
Uttar Pradesh	Hayatullah Ansari	INC	
Uttar Pradesh	Arjun Arora	INC	
Uttar Pradesh	Sukhdev Prasad	INC	
Uttar Pradesh	Mustafa Rashid Shervani	INC	
Uttar Pradesh	M S Gurupadaswamy	INC	
Uttar Pradesh	Raj Narain	OTH	
Uttar Pradesh	Hira Vallabha Tripathi	INC	
Uttar Pradesh	Joginder Singh	INC	res 20/09/1971
Uttar Pradesh	Gopal Swarup Pathak	INC	res 13/05/1967
Uttar Pradesh	Kunj Bihari Lal Rathi	JS	dea 13/07/1968
West Bengal	Chitta Basu	CPM	
West Bengal	Rajpat Singh Doogar	INC	
West Bengal	Mriganka M Sur	INC	
West Bengal	Biren Roy	INC	
West Bengal	Arun Prakash Chatterjee	CPM	

== Bye-elections ==
The following bye elections were held in the year 1966.

State - Member - Party

1. MP - Chakrapani Shukla - INC ( ele 08/02/1966 term till 1970 )
2. Rajasthan - Jagannath_Pahadia - INC ( ele 22/03/1966 term till 1970 )23/02/1967
3. Nominated - M N Kaul - NOM ( ele 30/03/1966 term till 1970 )
4. Uttar Pradesh - Tarkeshwar Pande - INC ( ele 30/07/1966 term till 1970 )
5. Haryana - Krishna Kant - INC ( ele 29/11/1966 term till 1972 )
6. Haryana - Ram Chander - INC ( ele 29/11/1966 term till 1968 )
