= Krishna Kaul =

Krishna Kaul may refer to:

- Krishna Kaul (politician) (1921–2008), Indian politician
- KRSNA (rapper), the stage name of Indian rapper Krishna Kaul
