= Sanjay Seth =

Sanjay Seth could refer to

- Sanjay Seth (Uttar Pradesh politician)
- Sanjay Seth (Jharkhand politician)
