= Satish Mishra =

Indian politician

Satish Chandra Mishra
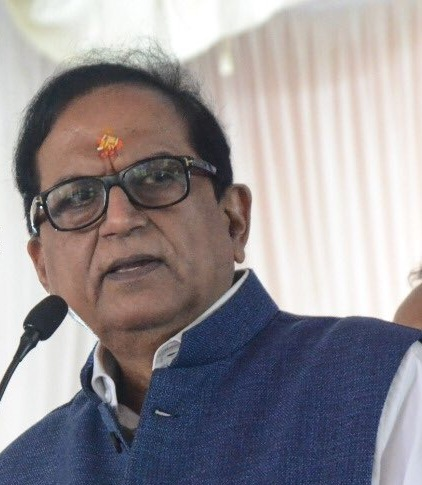

General Secretary of the Bahujan Samaj Party
- Incumbent
- Assumed office Jan. 2004
- BSP President: Mayawati

Member of Parliament, Rajya Sabha
- In office 5 July 2004 – 2 April 2022
- Succeeded by: Jayant Chaudhary
- Constituency: Uttar Pradesh

Leader of the Party in the Rajya Sabha
- In office July 2017 – April 2022
- Preceded by: Mayawati
- Succeeded by: Ramji Gautam

Personal details
- Born: 9 November 1952 (age 73) Kanpur, Uttar Pradesh, India
- Party: Bahujan Samaj Party
- Education: University of Allahabad; Pandit Prithi Nath College

Satish Chandra Mishra (born 9 November 1952) is an Indian politician who was the cabinet minister in Mayawati ministry in Uttar Pradesh, India, and a part of Bahujan Samaj Party (BSP). He is a lawyer by profession. He was a member of Rajya Sabha until 2 April 2022.

He is now the All India General Secretary of Bahujan Samaj Party.

== Personal life ==
Satish Misra is son of Justice Tribeni Sahai Misra and Shakuntala Misra. He was born on 9 November 1952 in Kanpur, Uttar Pradesh. He did his Graduation & then LL.B. for Pandit Prithi Nath College and Allahabad University.

== Career ==
- Jan. 1998-Feb.1999 Chairman, Bar Council of Uttar Pradesh
- May 2002 - Sept. 2003 Advocate General, Uttar Pradesh
- Jan. 2004 onwards All India General Secretary, Bahujan Samaj Party (B.S.P.)
- July 2004 Elected to Rajya Sabha
- Aug. 2004 onwards Member, Committee on Home Affairs Member, Committee on Petroleum and Natural Gas Member, Business Advisory Committee
- Sept. 2004 onwards Member, Committee on Members of Parliament Local Area Development Scheme (Rajya Sabha).
- Oct. 2004 onwards Member, Consultative Committee for the Ministry of External Affairs.
- Jan. 2006 onwards Member, Joint Parliamentary Committee on Wakf
- June 2006 onwards Member, Parliamentary Forum on Youth
- July 2010 Re-elected to Rajya Sabha (second term)
- July 2016 Re-elected to Rajya Sabha (third term)
