= Rajaram (politician) =

Indian politician

Member of Parliament, Rajya Sabha
- In office 26 Nov 2008 – 25 Nov 2020
- Succeeded by: Ramji Gautam
- Constituency: Uttar Pradesh

Personal details
- Party: Bahujan Samaj Party

Rajaram (born 1 July 1968) is an Indian politician from Lalganj, Azamgarh district in Uttar Pradesh. He was a Member of Parliament, representing Uttar Pradesh in the Rajya Sabha (the upper house of India's Parliament) for two terms from 2008 – 2020. He belongs to the Bahujan Samaj Party. He was appointed as one of the three national coordinators of the BSP, along with Ramji Gautam and Randhir Beniwal, by Mayawati in 2025.

== Personal life ==
He is MSW Post Graduate from Kashi Vidyapeeth, Varanasi.
