= Sanjay Seth (Uttar Pradesh politician) =

Indian politician (born 1961)

Member of Parliament, Rajya Sabha
- Incumbent
- Assumed office 3 April 2024
- Preceded by: G. V. L. Narasimha Rao
- Constituency: Uttar Pradesh
- In office 5 July 2016 – 4 July 2022
- Preceded by: Salim Ansari
- Succeeded by: Radha Mohan Das Agarwal
- Constituency: Uttar Pradesh

Personal details
- Born: 10 February 1961 (age 65) Lucknow, Uttar Pradesh, India
- Party: Bharatiya Janata Party (since 2019)
- Other political affiliations: Samajwadi Party (2016-2019)
- Spouse: Leena Seth (m. 1992)
- Children: 2
- Education: University of Lucknow

Sanjay Seth (born 10 February 1961) is an Indian politician from Uttar Pradesh. Sanjay Seth is a Member of Parliament in the Rajya Sabha of the third term representing Uttar Pradesh as a member of the Bharatiya Janata Party (BJP); born in 1961 in Mauranwa District, Unnao, in the state of Uttar Pradesh.

He has served as the Co-Vice President of the Uttar Pradesh Olympic Association (Affiliated to the Indian Olympic Association), as vice-president of the Uttar Pradesh Badminton Association (Affiliated to Badminton Association of India) and as President of the Confederation of Real Estate Developers' Association of India (CREDAI), Uttar Pradesh region. Seth joined Bharatiya Janta Party on 10 August 2019.

== Family and background ==
His grandfather, Talukdar Prayag Narain Seth, served as President of Maurawan Nagar Panchayat multiple times.

His father, Lavkush Narain Seth, is a lawyer who has practiced at the Lucknow Court.

His mother, Kusum Seth, is a homemaker.

Sanjay Seth is married to Leena Seth, the Director of Shalimar Group. She manages various landscaping and interior designing initiatives of the Shalimar's esteemed projects.

== Career ==
Sanjay Seth did his bachelor's degree in commerce (B. Com) from University of Lucknow and later co-founded Shalimar Corp Ltd with Mr. Masood Ahmad, making his first venture as an entrepreneur. Under his leadership, the company has developed numerous buildings. In 2016, he was elected as the president of the Confederation of Real Estate Developers' Association of India (CREDAI), Uttar Pradesh Region.

== Political career ==
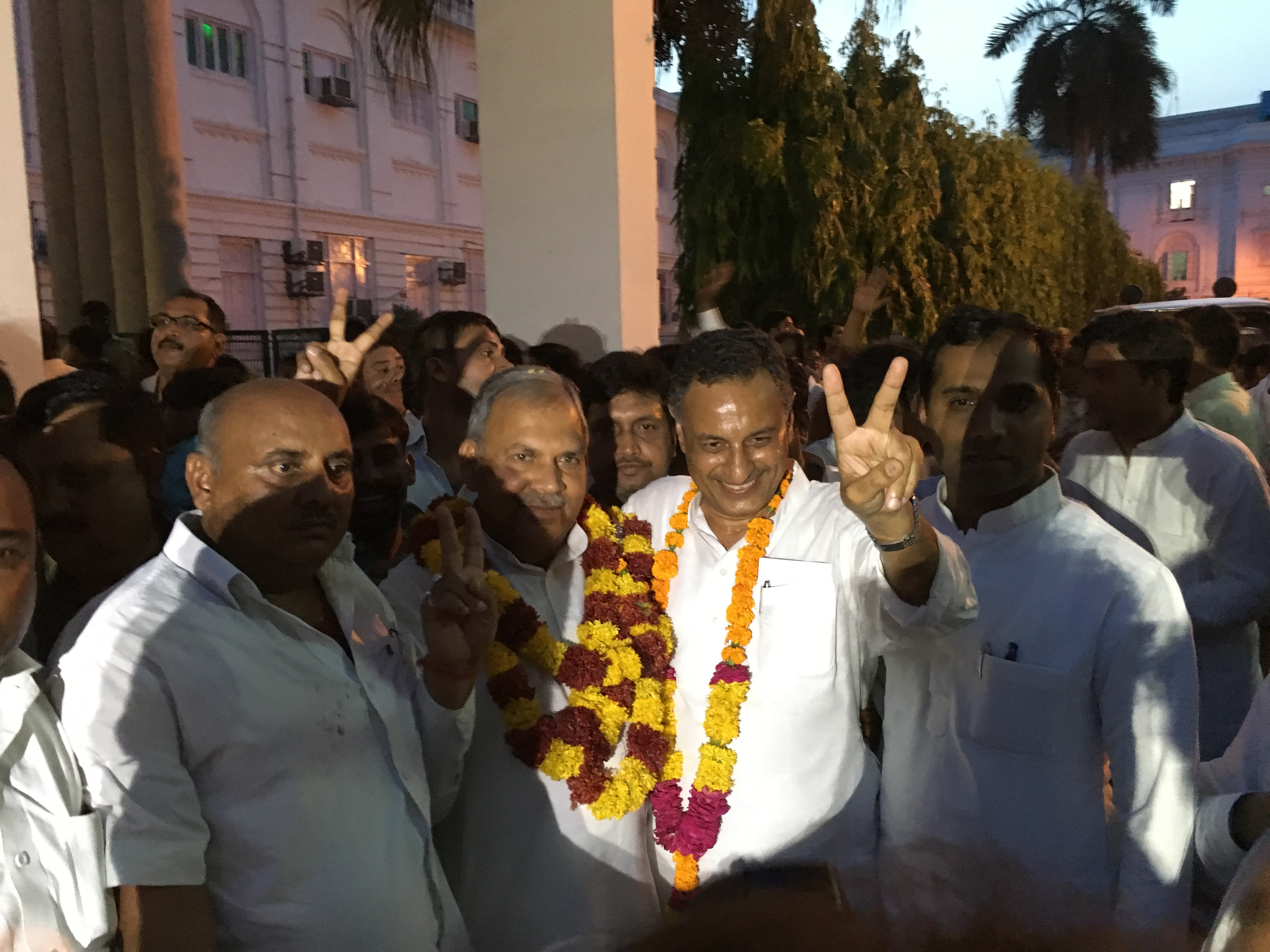
Seth at the inauguration of his term as Rajya Sabha MP

His early career was marked by associations with various leaders, including Samajwadi Party founder Mulayam Singh Yadav and his son Akhilesh Yadav. He was elected to the Rajya Sabha in July 2016.

An active member of the Rajya Sabha, Seth was appointed to the Parliamentary Committee on Water Resources (July 2016-Aug 2017). He also served on the Committee on Subordinate Legislation from September 2016 to June 2018. He is currently serving as a member on the Committee on Industry (since September 2017) and the Railway Convention Committee (since June 2018).

Seth joined Bharatiya Janta Party on 10 August 2019.

During his second term in the Rajya Sabha, he was reappointed to the Committee on Industry (February 2020 – July 2022) and also served on the House Committee (July 2020 – July 2022), in addition to being a Member of the Consultative Committee for the Ministry of Culture and Tourism (October 2019 – July 2022). In his current tenure, he holds memberships in the Committee on Finance (since September 2024), the Consultative Committee for the Ministry of Corporate Affairs (since October 2024), and the Committee of Privileges (since November 2024).

== Personal life ==
Seth is married to Leena Seth. They have a son and a daughter.
