= Arun Singh (Indian politician) =

Indian politician (born 1965)

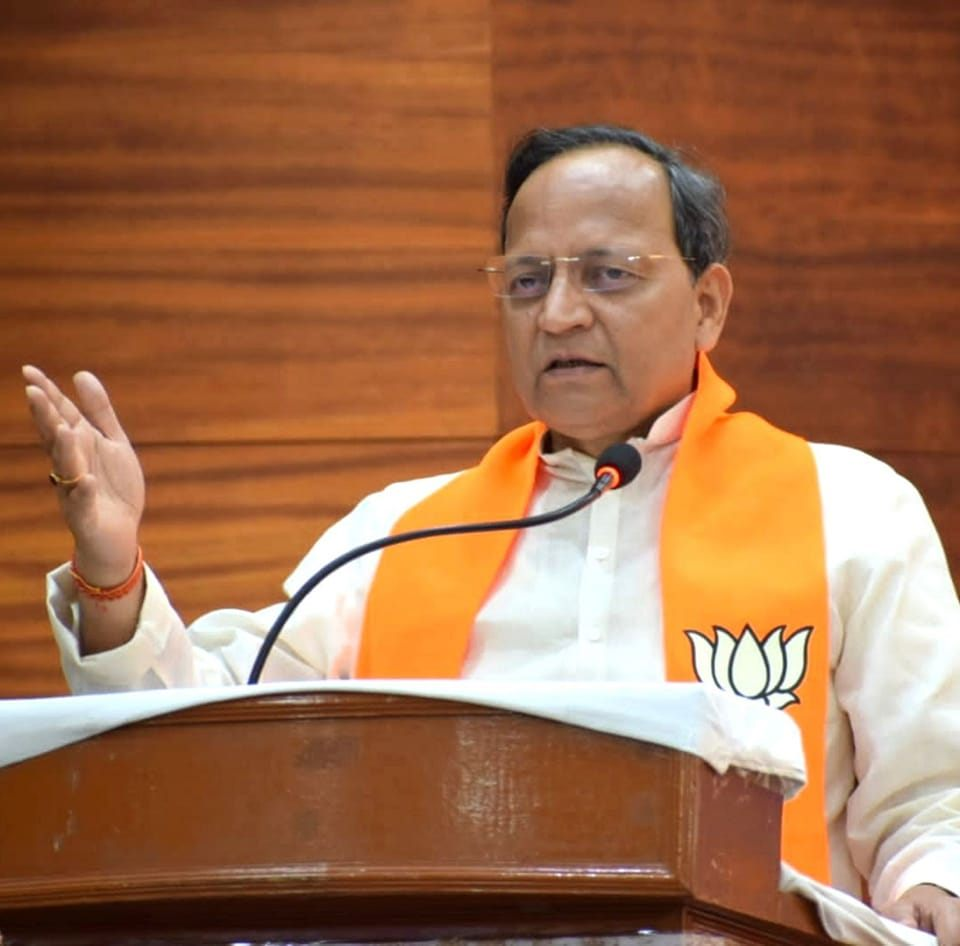

Member of parliament, Rajya Sabha
- In office 5 December 2019 – 25 November 2026
- Preceded by: Tazeen Fatma
- Constituency: Uttar Pradesh

Standing Committee Member
- Committee on Chemicals and Fertilizers; Committee on Consumer Affairs,Food and Public Distribution; Committee on Public Undertakings

National General Secretary of Bharatiya Janata Party
- Incumbent
- Assumed office 17 June 2015

State Incharge of Bharatiya Janata Party, Odisha
- In office 2013–2019

State Incharge of Bharatiya Janata Party of Karnataka & Rajasthan
- In office November 2019 – 2024
- Succeeded by: Radha Mohan Das Agarwal

Personal details
- Born: 4 April 1965 (age 61) Mirzapur, Uttar Pradesh, India
- Party: Bharatiya Janata Party
- Spouse: Meenakshi Singh (m. 1991)
- Children: 3 (1 son and 2 daughters)
- Parents: Vijay Naraian Singh (father); Lalita Singh (mother)
- Education: Chartered Accountant
- Alma mater: Allahabad University
- Website: www.arunsinghbjp.in
- Source

Arun Singh (born 4 April 1965) is an Indian politician and a senior leader of the Bharatiya Janata Party (BJP) who is currently serving his second term as a Member of Parliament in the Rajya Sabha. He previously served as the National General Secretary and Headquarters In-charge of the BJP.

Singh has discharged responsibilities as BJP's State Incharge of various states, including Andhra Pradesh, Rajasthan, Karnataka, Odisha, Jharkhand and Ladakh.

During the 2024 Lok Sabha Elections, he was appointed as the Election In-charge of Andhra Pradesh by the Bharatiya Janata Party (BJP). His efforts contributed to the BJP's strong performance in Andhra Pradesh during the 2024 General and Assembly elections.

As the State Incharge of Rajasthan from 2019 to 2023, he participated in giving the party organizational solidity and stability. Under the leadership of Prime Minister Narendra Modi, the efforts of Singh helped the BJP's victory in 2023 Rajasthan Vidhan Sabha Elections. Earlier, when he was Incharge of India's eastern state of Odisha, he helped the party to strengthen its organisational base at the grassroots level increasing the party's membership, which resulted in an exponential increase in vote share.

Singh led the CII-SPF Delegation of Members of Parliament from India to Japan as a Mission leader which visited multiple locations across Japan from 24 February to 1 March 2025. This visit was organized with an objective of strengthening bilateral ties between the two nations and aimed to enhance bilateral cooperation and collaborations, foster talent and technology exchange, and build strategic partnerships.

He has been actively involved in the parliamentary proceedings. Singh was an accountant before entering politics which helps him present the stand of the party on topics in the field of economics and finance. He played a crucial role in clarifying the party's position through his interventions in the Parliament over various bills like Union Budget 2020-21 and 2021–22, Insurance Amendment Bill 2021, Working of the Ministry of Micro, Small & Medium Enterprises, Foreign Contribution and Regulation Amendment Bill 2020, Insolvency & Bankruptcy Code and the Appropriation Bill 2022 and 2023.

== Early life and education ==
Arun Singh was born on 4 April 1965 in the remote village of Baidha in the district of Mirzapur, Uttar Pradesh. His father, Vijay Narayan Singh, was a teacher and farmer.

Singh completed his primary and secondary education at Mirzapur. He is a graduate from Allahabad University in commerce. In 1984, after graduating, he went to Delhi to pursue a Chartered Accountancy course. In 1988, he qualified as a Chartered Accountant with an All India Rank. In his 20s, he travelled across the country as an auditor. Since his youth, he developed an interest in the ideology of nationalism, which led to his association with the Rashtriya Swayamsevak Sangh (RSS). He started working with the Sampark Pramukh. Subsequently, he joined the Bharatiya Janta Party's Youth wing and worked towards expanding the party.

Singh has also been an academician. He has been a guest faculty in the discipline of management and finance, served as the Director of State Bank of India and Union Bank for seven years, worked as a consultant for projects of World Bank and United Nations and with several notable corporations. He is the Secretary of the Dr. Shyama Prasad Mukherjee Research Foundation (SPMRF).

== Political career ==
His public life commenced with joining Rashtriya Swayamsevak Sangh (RSS) and began to work with Sampark Pramukh. He later became the leader of the Bharatiya Janata Yuva Morcha, the youth wing of the Bharatiya Janata Party (BJP). Singh assumed the office of Vice President and National Treasurer of the youth wing of BJP from 1999 to 2004; he became the National Co-convener of the Investor Cell in 2005 and later became National Convenor in 2009.

Being the National Treasurer of BJYM, he is credited for organising the largest ever National Youth Convention in Agra on 3–4 October 2001. The valedictory session of the convention was addressed by the then Prime Minister Shri Atal Bihari Vajpayee. He was also instrumental as National Vice President of BJYM in organizing the International Youth Convention at Delhi in 2003. The convention focused on the subject of the "International Youth Conference on Terrorism". It was attended by the youth of more than 40 countries.

Singh managed various processes, promoting the party's ideology and vision and handling the media in the 2003, 2008, and 2013 Chhattisgarh elections. Later, he managed Chhattisgarh in the 2009 Lok Sabha elections and Jharkhand Vidhan Sabha elections.

Singh also served as the National Executive Member of the BJP from 2009 to 2014. He was the State Co-Incharge (Prabhari) of Odisha BJP from 2013 to 2014 and was later promoted to the post of State Incharge in 2014. He has been a member of the Team of Modi Campaign Committee. He served as the National Secretary of BJP from 16 August 2014 till 16 June 2015. He was the National Co-Incharge for the membership drive under the leadership of Shri Amit Shah. The campaign led to his promotion to the post of National General Secretary and Headquarter In-charge of BJP on 17 June 2015.

During the 2024 Lok Sabha Elections, he was appointed as the election In-charge of the South Indian state Andhra Pradesh by Bharatiya Janata Party. Prior to that, he was also BJP Incharge of Rajasthan and another southern state Karnataka, where he played an instrumental role in giving the party organizational solidity and stability. Under the leadership of Prime Minister Narendra Modi, Singh was considered a key face behind the Party's thumping victory in the 2023 Rajasthan Vidhan Sabha Elections. During 2019 Lok Sabha Elections too, Singh played a pivotal role in strengthening the organizational base of the party in Odisha at the grassroots level. He was also the Incharge for the 2020 election of Ladakh Autonomous Hill Development Council (LAHDC), where BJP registered a stunning victory.

Singh is the Member of Parliament (Rajya Sabha) for Uttar Pradesh, as well as the National General Secretary, In-Charge of the BJP Headquarters, and member of the Office Modernisation Committee. He also leads the party's National Member Programme. In December 2019, he was elected as a Member of Parliament, Rajya Sabha from Uttar Pradesh, and he was reelected in November 2020 for the consecutive second term.

Singh is also a member of the Standing Committee on Water Resources and Standing Committee on Chemical & Fertilizers. He also holds membership in the Committee on Petitions Rajya Sabha and the Consultative Committee for the Ministry of Finance.

== Ideology ==
Singh believes in Integral Humanism.

== Personal life ==
Singh's wife is a Post Graduate in Zoology. They have two daughters and a son.
