= Munquad Ali =

Indian politician

Member of Parliament, Rajya Sabha
- In office 3 April 2012 – 2 April 2018
- Succeeded by: Sakal Deep Rajbhar, BJP
- Constituency: Uttar Pradesh

President of Bahujan Samaj Party, Uttar Pradesh
- In office 8 Aug 2019 – 15 Nov 2020
- National President: Mayawati
- Preceded by: R. S. Kushwaha

Personal details
- Party: Bahujan Samaj Party

Munquad Ali is a politician and Uttar Pradesh state president of Bahujan Samaj Party. He was a Member of the Parliament of India representing Uttar Pradesh in the Rajya Sabha, the upper house of the Indian Parliament.
