= Banwari Lal Verma =

Indian politician (born 1961)

Banwari Lal Verma (Lodhi)
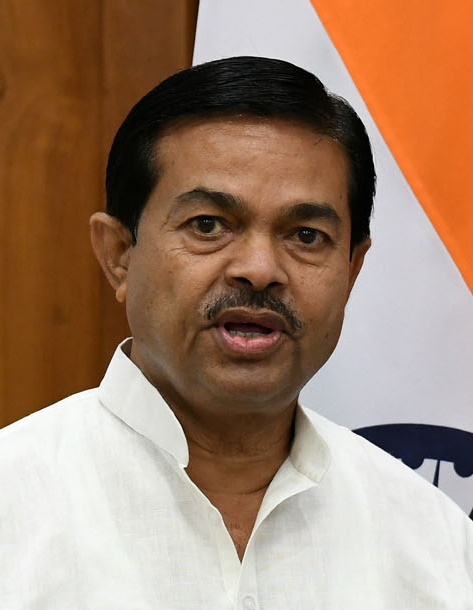
- Official portrait, 2021

Union Minister of State for Consumer Affairs, Food & Public Distribution
- Incumbent
- Assumed office 10 June 2024
- Minister: Pralhad Joshi

Union Minister of State for Social Justice & Empowerment
- Incumbent
- Assumed office 10 June 2024
- Minister: Virendra Kumar Khatik

Union Minister of State for Development of North Eastern Region
- In office 7 July 2021 – 9 June 2024
- Minister: G. Kishan Reddy

Union Minister of State for Cooperation
- In office 7 July 2021 – 9 June 2024
- Minister: Amit Shah

Member of Parliament, Rajya Sabha
- In office 26 November 2020 – 25 November 2026
- Preceded by: Veer Singh
- Constituency: Uttar Pradesh

Personal details
- Born: 7 August 1961 (age 65) Ujhani, Uttar Pradesh, India
- Party: Bharatiya Janata Party
- Spouse: Shanti Devi Verma (m. 1975)
- Children: 3 (1 son & 2 daughters)
- Parents: Panna Lal Verma (father); Bhagya Wati Devi (mother)
- Education: Master of Arts
- Alma mater: Sampurnanand Sanskrit Vishwavidyalaya

Banwari Lal Verma (born 7 August 1961) is an Indian politician and current Minister of State in the Ministry of Social Justice and Empowerment and Minister of State in the Ministry of Consumer Affairs, Food and Public Distribution of the Government of India.

== Political career ==
Verma started off as a party worker from Badaun. He holds the charge of state vice-president since 2018. He is a prominent leader among the OBC Lodhi community in western UP. Verma is a former president of the Braj region. He is considered as a close-aide former CM Kalyan Singh.

He also holds the post of chairman of UP State Construction Development Corporation Limited (UP Samaj Kalyan Nirman Nigam) which has the same status as of a Minister of State.

== See also ==
- Third Modi ministry
