= Lalit Suri =

Indian politician (1946-2006)

Member of Parliament, Rajya Sabha
- In office 14 November 2002 – 4 July 2004
- Preceded by: B. P. Singhal
- Succeeded by: Jaya Bachchan
- Constituency: Uttar Pradesh

Personal details
- Born: 19 November 1946 Rawalpindi, Punjab, British India
- Died: 10 October 2006 (aged 59) London, England
- Party: Independent
- Spouse: Jyotsna Suri (m. 1973)
- Children: 4
- Occupation: Businessperson; politician

Lalit Suri (19 November 1946 — 10 October 2006) was an Indian politician. He was a Member of Parliament, representing Uttar Pradesh in the Rajya Sabha the upper house of India's Parliament as an Independent politician.

Being the Chairman of the Bharat Hotels chain now known as LaLiT, he was the single-largest hotel owner owning around 1600 rooms. His hotel chain encompasses seven hotels including the flagship InterContinental The Grand in Delhi along with other six Grand hotels in Mumbai, Goa, Bangalore, Srinagar, Udaipur and Khajuraho. He died at the age of 59 on October 10, 2006, in London.

== Election History ==
=== Rajya Sabha ===
Position	Party	Const	From	To	Tenure
Member of Parliament, Rajya Sabha (1st Term)	IND	Uttar Pradesh	14 November 2002	7 April 2004	1 year, 145 days
Member of Parliament, Rajya Sabha (2nd Term)	IND	Uttar Pradesh	5 July 2004	10 October 2006	2 years, 97 days
