= Geeta Shakya =

Indian politician

Geeta alias Chandra Prabha

Member of Parliament, Rajya Sabha
- Incumbent
- Assumed office 25 November 2020
- Preceded by: P. L. Punia
- Constituency: Uttar Pradesh

Personal details
- Born: 11 November 1969 (age 56) Hamirpur, Uttar Pradesh, India
- Party: Bharatiya Janata Party
- Spouse: Mukut Singh
- Children: 2
- Education: M.A. in sociology
- Alma mater: Kanpur University
- Profession: Teacher, Principal, Politician
- Nickname: Chandraprabha

Geeta Shakya also known as Geeta alias Chandra Prabha is an Indian politician and a Member of Parliament in the Rajya Sabha from Uttar Pradesh. She is a member of the Bharatiya Janata Party.

She is a former district president of the BJP from Auraiya and a prominent leader among the OBC.

== Personal life ==
She began her career as a teacher and was a Principal from 2005 to 2010 and her husband has also been a Principal. She has two children, a son and a daughter. Her son Rishabh is in the BSF Airwing and her daughter is married.

== Political career ==
Geeta Shakya began her political career as Gram Pradhan from Shihuan Gram Panchayat in 2000.

Later she joined the Bharatiya Janata Party and became the district president of Auraiya for two years.

She is also State President of BJP’s Women Wing since July 2021.

She is prominent as a leader among the Other Backward Classes in the state.
