= Sangh Priya Gautam =

Indian politician

Union Minister of State (Independent Charge) of Agro and Rural Industries
- In office 29 January 2003 – 22 May 2004
- Prime Minister: Atal Bihari Vajpayee
- Preceded by: Kariya Munda
- Succeeded by: Mahaveer Prasad

Member of Parliament, Rajya Sabha
- In office 9 November 2000 – 4 July 2004
- Constituency: Uttarakhand
- In office 5 July 1998 – 8 November 2000
- Constituency: Uttar Pradesh
- In office 3 April 1990 – 2 April 1996
- Constituency: Uttar Pradesh

Personal details
- Born: 31 January 1931 (age 95) Bulandshahr
- Party: Bharatiya Janata Party
- Education: Aligarh Muslim University

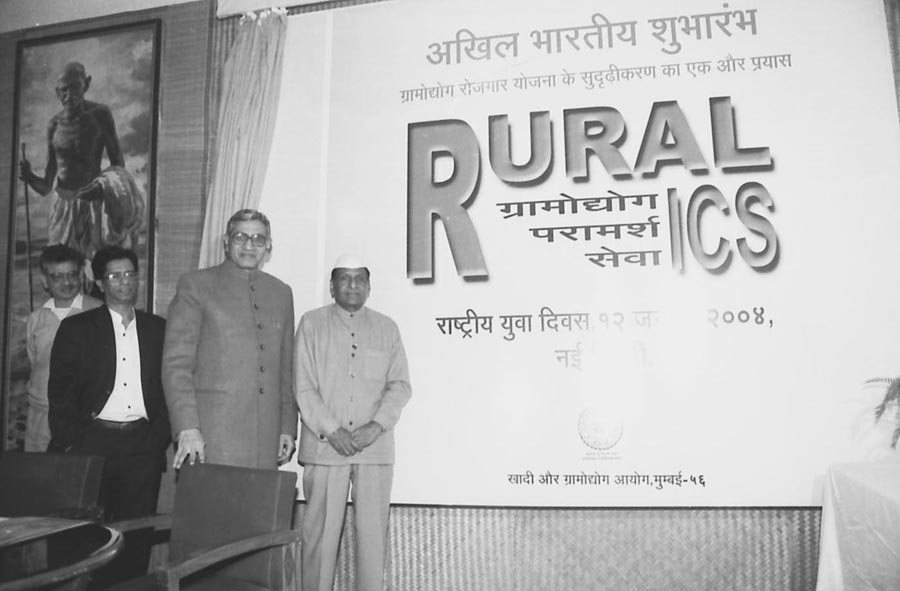
The Minister of Agro and Rural Industries Shri Sangh Priya Gautam launches Rural Industries Consultancy Services (RICS) on the occasion of "National Youth Day" in New Delhi on January 12, 2003

Sangh Priya Gautam (b 1931) is a former Union minister of state for agro and rural industries of India. He was minister in the Third Vajpayee ministry between 2003 and 2004. He was born in 1931 in Bulandshahr district in Uttar Pradesh in India and studied at law Aligarh Muslim University. A Lawyer by profession, he was elected to Rajya Sabha in 1990 and in 1998 as a candidate of Bharatiya Janata Party.

He was BJP candidate for Hapur constituency in 1984 when he came third. Later he was elected to Rajya Sabha twice. After the defeat of the Vajpayee Government in the 2004 general election, Shri Gautam started to complain about being sidelined in the party and was suspended in 2006 for anti-party activities. He was admitted back in the party in 2011. Even in 2010s after re-joining BJP, he continued to be a vocal critic of the party.

== See also ==
Sanghmitra Maurya, a woman leader of the same party (BJP) in UP in 2010s, with a similar name which causes confusion for some people
