= Brij Lal (politician) =

Indian politician

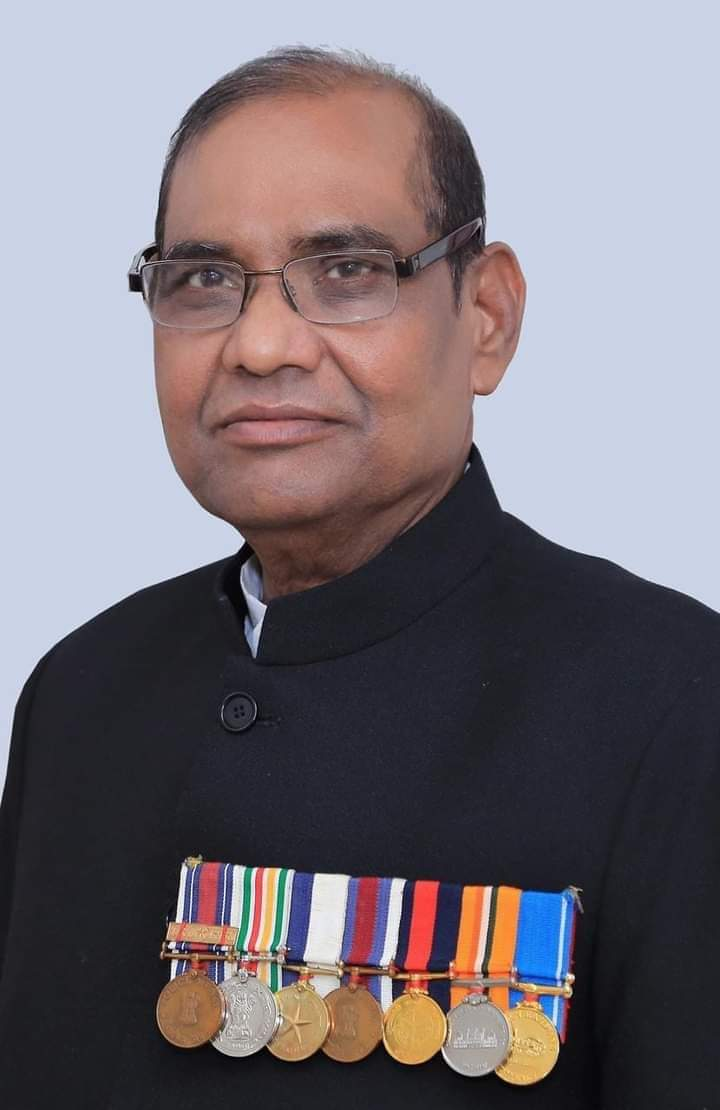

Member of Parliament, Rajya Sabha
- Incumbent
- Assumed office 25 November 2020
- Preceded by: Javed Ali Khan
- Constituency: Uttar Pradesh

Director General of Police, Uttar Pradesh Police
- In office 30 September 2011 – 8 January 2012
- Preceded by: Karamveer Singh
- Succeeded by: Atul Kumar

Chairman of Uttar Pradesh SC/ST Commission
- In office April 2018 – November 2019
- Chief Minister: Yogi Adityanath

Personal details
- Born: 17 November 1954 (age 71) Gujrauliya Chilhiya Shohratgarh Siddharthnagar; India
- Party: Bharatiya Janata Party
- Education: University of Allahabad (BSc); University of Allahabad (MSc Mathematics)
- Occupation: IPS officer, politician
- Profession: Indian Police Service

Brij Lal is a 1977-batch IPS officer and an Indian politician. He is a Member of Parliament in the Rajya Sabha from Uttar Pradesh. He belongs to the Bharatiya Janata Party. He was the Director General of Police of Uttar Pradesh during the Mayawati Government.

In 2018, the Government of Uttar Pradesh appointed him as the head of scheduled caste and scheduled tribes commission in the state. he belong to the Koli community of Uttar Pradesh.

After his retirement he has been active in Dalit politics. He has emerged as one of the strong Dalit leaders of the party.

== Police career ==
Brij Lal
- Police career
- Department: Uttar Pradesh Police
- Service years: 1977- 2014
- Rank: Director General of Police
- Awards: President's Police Medal for Distinguished Service; President's Police Medal for Gallantry

=== Indian Police Service ===
He is a 1977-batch IPS officer. He held the charge of Special Director General (law and order) of UP Police. He has held many positions like ADG Law & order and crime, Anti-Terror Squad (ATS) and Special Task Force (STF).

=== Uttar Pradesh DGP ===
He Worked As Director General Of Uttar Pradesh Police from 30 September 2011 to 8 January 2012.

=== Medals by President of India ===
- President's Police Medal for Distinguished Services.
- Police Medal for Long and Meritorious Services.
- Police Medal for Gallantry.
- BAR to Police Medal for Gallantry.

=== Other medals and decorations ===
- Uttar Pradesh Chief Minister’s, Police Medal for Outstanding Services with 25000/- Rupees Cash Reward.
- Rs. 1 Lakh cash Reward by Delhi Police for Liquidating a Notorious Mafia of Delhi in 1992.
- Rs. 3 Lakh cash Reward by Uttar Pradesh Government for Anti-Dacoity Operations in Chambal and Patha area of U.P.
- D.G. RPF Insignia (Silver Disk) for Bravery.

== Politics ==
He was considered a close-aide of former Chief Minister and BSP chief Mayawati. However, In 2015 after he retired he joined the Bharatiya Janata Party.

In 2020, he was nominated to the Rajya Sabha from Uttar Pradesh.

In 2020 he said,

Like land mafia, mining mafia, coal mafia and jungle mafia, there exists a kanoon (law) mafia which ensures denial of justice to the society and system.

== Books published. ==
- Siyasat ka Sabak (Jogendra Nath Mandal).
- Indian Mujahidin (Nishane Par Gujarat).
- Police ki Barat, (Pashchimi U.P. Gangwar, Phoolan Devi aur Chambal Gangs.)
- Dedh Biswa Zameen (Purvi U.P. Gangwar aur Lucknow ke Rangbaaz)

== See also ==
- Law enforcement in India
