= Shiv Pratap Shukla =

Indian politician (born 1952)

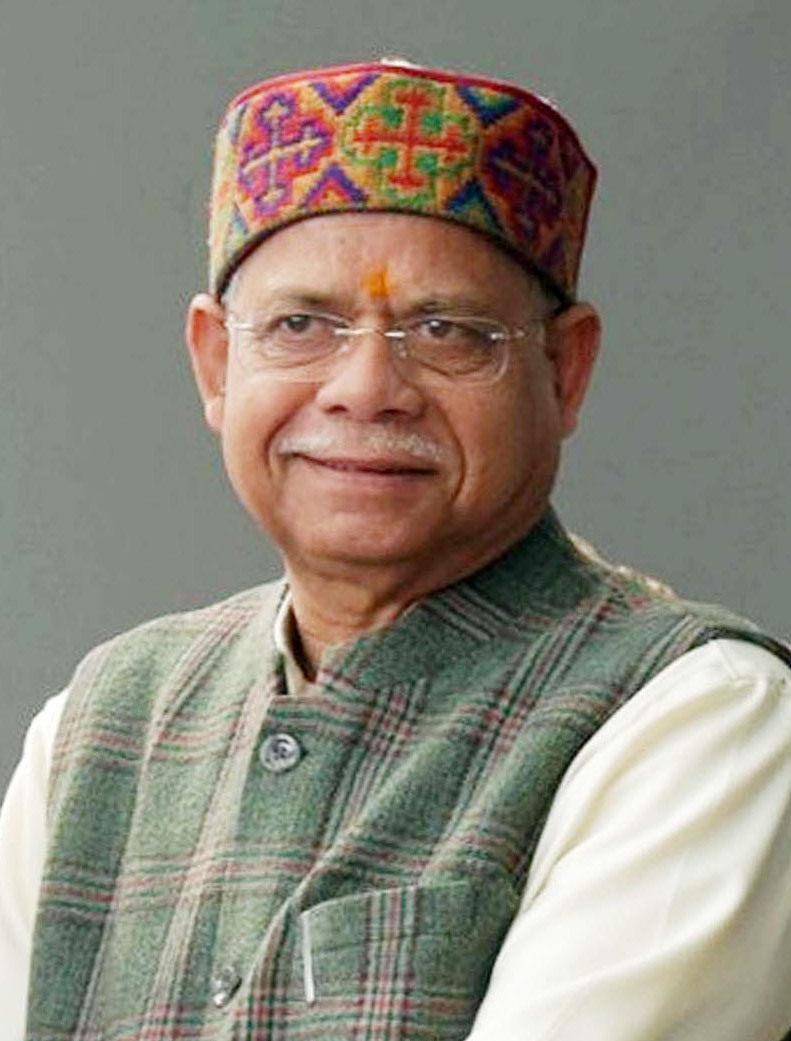
- Shukla in 2018

5th Governor of Telangana
- Incumbent
- Assumed office 11 March 2026
- President: Droupadi Murmu
- Chief Minister: Revanth Reddy
- Preceded by: Jishnu Dev Varma

Governor of Himachal Pradesh
- In office 18 February 2023 – 11 March 2026
- Preceded by: Rajendra Arlekar
- Succeeded by: Kavinder Gupta

Union Minister of State for Finance
- In office 3 September 2017 – 30 May 2019
- Minister: Arun Jaitley
- Preceded by: Santosh Gangwar
- Succeeded by: Anurag Thakur

Member of Parliament, Rajya Sabha
- In office 5 July 2016 – 4 July 2022
- Preceded by: Mukhtar Abbas Naqvi, BJP
- Succeeded by: Kapil Sibal, IND
- Constituency: Uttar Pradesh

Vice President of Bharatiya Janata Party, Uttar Pradesh
- In office 2012–2017

Cabinet Minister in Uttar Pradesh
- In office 21 September 1997 – 8 March 2002
- Chief Minister: Kalyan Singh; Ram Prakash Gupta; Rajnath Singh

Member of Uttar Pradesh Legislative Assembly
- In office 5 December 1989 – 8 March 2002
- Preceded by: Sunil Kumar Shastri
- Succeeded by: Radha Mohan Das Agarwal
- Constituency: Gorakhpur Urban

Personal details
- Born: 1 April 1952 (age 74) Rudrapur, Uttar Pradesh, India
- Party: Bharatiya Janata Party
- Education: Gorakhpur University
- Occupation: Politician; lawyer; statesman

Shiv Pratap Shukla (born 1 April 1952) is an Indian politician and statesman. Currently, he is the Governor of Telangana since 2026. He served as the 22nd Governor of Himachal Pradesh from 2023 to 2026. He was the Minister of State for Finance in the First Modi ministry. He was a Member of Parliament in the upper house (Rajya Sabha) of the Indian Parliament represented the Indian state, Uttar Pradesh.

== Political career ==
=== Member of Legislative Assembly ===
Shukla campaigned in the General Elections in 1989 and was elected a member of the Uttar Pradesh Legislative Assembly, defeating Shri Sunil Shastri of INC. He was elected as Member of the Legislative Assembly four consecutive times in 1989, 1991, 1993 and 1996.

=== Minister of state in the BJP government ===
Shukla was appointed a state minister in Bharatiya Janata Party (BJP) led governments in Uttar Pradesh. He was appointed the cabinet Minister for Jails in 1996–1998 under Bharatiya Janata Party–Bahujan Samaj Party a short-lived coalition government of Mayawati and Kalyan Singh and later on appointed Minister for Rural Development in year 1998–2002 under the BJP government of then Chief Minister Rajnath Singh.

Political offices
Preceded by Jishnu Dev Varma	Governor of Telangana; 06 March 2026 – present	Incumbent
