= Javed Ali Khan =

Indian politician (born 1962)

Member of Parliament, Rajya Sabha for Uttar Pradesh
- Incumbent
- Assumed office 5 July 2022
- Constituency: Uttar Pradesh
- In office 26 November 2014 – 25 November 2020
- Succeeded by: Brij Lal

Personal details
- Born: 31 October 1962 (age 63) Sambhal, Uttar Pradesh, India
- Party: Samajwadi Party
- Spouse: Asima Kishwar (m. 1995)
- Children: 2 (1 son and 1 daughter)
- Parents: Ashfaq Ali Khan (father); Mushtaq Begum (mother)

Javed Ali Khan (born 31 October 1962) is an Indian politician. He is a member of the Samajwadi Party and a member of the Rajya Sabha, representing Uttar Pradesh.

== Early life ==
Khan was born on October 31, 1962, in Mirzapur Nasrullapur in Sambhal district, Uttar Pradesh, to Ashfaq Ali Khan and Mushtaq Begum. Khan completed his primary education in Bahjoi (Sambhal). For higher education he went to Delhi with his father who worked in the government. After enrolling in Jamia Millia Islamia from Delhi, he earned a diploma in civil engineering. He then graduated from Rohilkhand University, Bareilly. He earned his Masters in political science through correspondence from Osmania University, Hyderabad. He married Asima Kishwar in the year 1995.

== Political career ==
Khan became active in student politics, and while studying at Jamia, he joined the left-wing All India Students' Federation and was elected general secretary of the Jamia Students' Union in the academic year 1984–85. He served as president of the leftist student organization All India Youth Federation during 1993-94 and joined the Samajwadi Party in 1994. Since then he has continuously worked for the party and organization.

In 1999, when Mulayam Singh Yadav, then-President of the Samajwadi Party, contested the Lok Sabha election from Sambhal, Khan played an important role in his campaign and became a close associate.

He was made the district president of the Samajwadi Party unit Moradabad in 2006 and in the 2007 Uttar Pradesh assembly elections, he contested for the from Thakurdwara constituency, where he was defeated. In the 2014 Lok Sabha elections, Khan was momentarily the Samajwadi Party's candidate from the Sambhal constituency, outgoing MP Shafiqur Rahman Barq was instead declared the candidate. Despite being cut, Khan pledged allegiance to the party. He worked in favor of the party.

In the November 2014, the Samajwadi Party made him the party's candidate for the Rajya Sabha and remained a member until 2020. In 2022, he was reelected. Khan served on the Coordination Committee of the Indian National Developmental Inclusive Alliance at its 2023 Mumbai convention.
