= Pyare Lal Kureel =

Indian politician

Member of Parliament, Lok Sabha
- In office 1952-1957
- Succeeded by: Raja Dinesh Singh
- Constituency: Banda cum Fatehpur, Uttar Pradesh

Member of Parliament, Rajya Sabha
- In office 03-Apr-1974 – 02-Apr-1980
- Constituency: Uttar Pradesh

Personal details
- Born: 27 December 1916 Ghatampur, Purwa Tehsil, Kanpur Division, United Provinces, British India
- Died: 27 December 1984 (aged 68) Lucknow, Uttar Pradesh, India
- Party: Indian National Congress
- Spouse: Smt.Krishna Kumari

Pyare Lal Kureel 'Talib' (27 December 1916 – 27 December 1984) was an Indian politician, Urdu poet and Dalit activist.

== Early life ==
Pyare Lal Kureel was born to Manuva Ram Kureel, who was a subedar-major into British Indian Army, and was also honoured by Imperial Service Order. They left their native place and moved to Lucknow due to various incidents of discrimination against them. His elder brother, Mohanlal Kureel served in the Chamar Regiment and been part of INA.

He did B.A from Forman Christian College (Lahore), MA and also LLB from University of Lucknow and started practicing as a lawyer in the District Court.

== Political career ==
In 1942 he joined Dr. B. R. Ambedkar's Scheduled Caste Federation and became president of its Lucknow branch. He became a member of the Central Legislative Assembly in the same year and served until 1946. He also became Secretary of the Independent Party in the Central Assembly. Later he gave support to Congress and joined it.

In 1952, he became Member of Parliament from Banda cum Fatehpur constituency sharing seat with Shive Dayal and served until 1957. He also served as the member of Rajya Sabha from Uttar Pradesh.

He also became a member of the Electoral College for Presidential Election in 1982.

== Activism ==
He joined social service with his father and started foing works for upliftment of Dalits, abolition of the Choudhary system used to do adjucating the cases between communities and also played prominent role against Brahminism. He also built libraries schools and Ravidas temples for own community. He along with Dalit leaders protested against passing of Poona Pact.

Kureel was founder of the All India Scheduled Castes Students's movement at Lucknow for the rights of students of Depressed Classes. Later he founded All India Depressed Classes Association and started his own business and been M.D of Kureel Leather Works Ltd.

In 1948 he became member of District Board Unnao, State Harijan Sahayak Board (U.P) Lucknow, member of Delhi University Court and Governing Body of the Indian School of Mines (Dhanbad).

== Literary career ==
He also worked as editor of "Jalte Deep" (a monthly film magazine), the "Social Reform" and the "Apna Desh" (a weekly). He was Chairman of Oriental Films Corporation of India Ltd. In 1947 he became President of S.C. Educational and Cultural Society (U.P) and in 1952 of Social Reform Publications Ltd.

He was one of the known poet and his writings include "Nawa-i-Sarosh", "Sarir-e-khama" and "Nala-e-Dard" (Urdu), "The Problem of Minorities" and "What about the sixty millions".
