= Sangeeta Balwant =

Indian politician

Member of Parliament, Rajya Sabha
- Incumbent
- Assumed office 2024
- Preceded by: Sakal Deep Rajbhar
- Constituency: Uttar Pradesh

Minister of state for Co-operatives Government of Uttar Pradesh
- In office 26 September 2021 – 25 March 2022
- Chief Minister: Yogi Adityanath
- Minister: Mukut Bihari

Member of Uttar Pradesh Legislative Assembly
- In office 2017–2022
- Preceded by: Vijay Kumar Mishra
- Succeeded by: Jaikishan
- Constituency: Ghazipur Sadar

Personal details
- Born: 1 October 1978 (age 47) Ghazipur, Uttar Pradesh
- Party: Bharatiya Janata Party
- Spouse: Dr Awdhesh Kumar (m. 2002)
- Children: 2 sons
- Parent: Ram Surat Bind (father)
- Education: B.Ed, LLB, PhD
- Profession: Politician

Sangeeta Balwant is an Indian politician from the Bhartiya Janata Party. Currently Serving as Member of Parliament Rajya Sabha From Uttar Pradesh. Balwant contested the Uttar Pradesh Legislative Assembly election held in 2017 and was elected from the Ghazipur Sadar assembly constituency. She is known as grass-rooted political leader.

== Early life ==
Sangeeta was born in Ghazipur City. She got her education in the city and started taking part in political activities of Bahujan Samaj Party. However, with the influence of BJP leader Manoj Sinha, she joined Bhartiya Janata Party.

== Posts held ==
#	From	To	Position	Comments
01	2017	2022	Member, 17th Legislative Assembly	

== See also ==
- Uttar Pradesh Legislative Assembly
