= Gorakhpur Urban Assembly constituency =

Constituency of the Uttar Pradesh legislative assembly in India

Coordinates: 26.76°N 83.39°E

Gorakhpur Urban
- Constituency No. 322 for the Uttar Pradesh Legislative Assembly

Constituency details
- Country: India
- Region: North India
- State: Uttar Pradesh
- District: Gorakhpur
- Lok Sabha constituency: Gorakhpur
- Total electors: 4,64,784
- Reservation: None

Member of Legislative Assembly
- 18th Uttar Pradesh Legislative Assembly
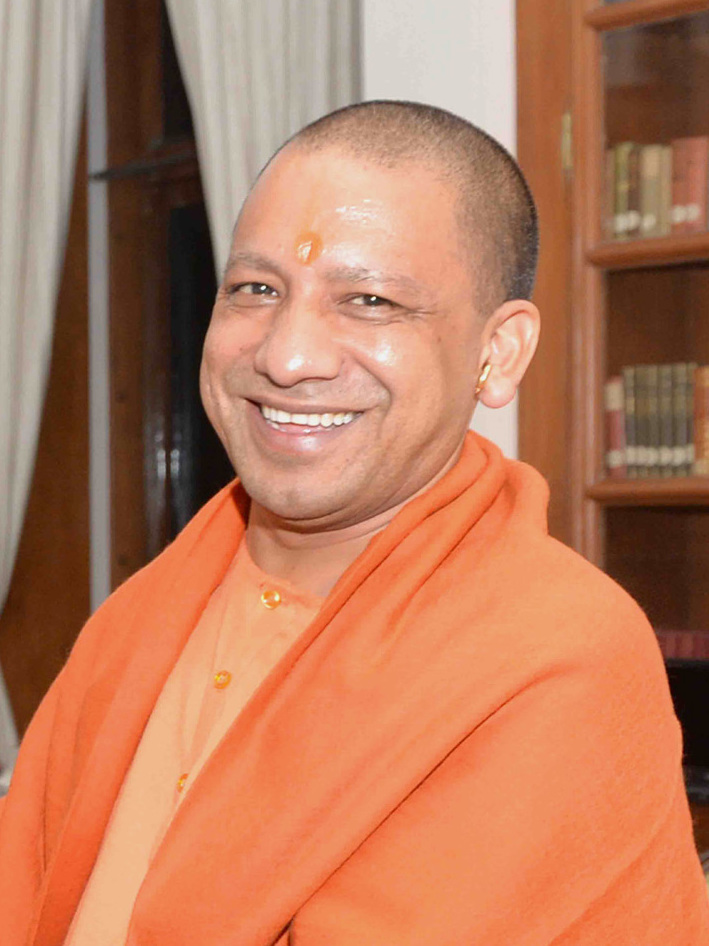
- Incumbent Yogi Adityanath
- Party: BJP
- Alliance: NDA
- Elected year: 2022
- Preceded by: R. M. Das Agarwal, BJP

Gorakhpur Urban is a constituency of the Uttar Pradesh Legislative Assembly covering the city of Gorakhpur in the Gorakhpur district of Uttar Pradesh, India.

Gorakhpur Urban is one of five assembly constituencies in the Gorakhpur Lok Sabha constituency. Since 2008, this assembly constituency is numbered 322 amongst 403 constituencies.

In 2022 Uttar Pradesh Legislative Assembly election, Bharatiya Janata Party (BJP) candidate Yogi Adityanath as well as the incumbent Chief Minister of Uttar Pradesh won the seat by defeating Samajwadi Party candidate Sabhawati Shukla by a margin of 1,03,390 votes.

== Members of the Legislative Assembly ==
Year	Member	Party
1951	Istafa Hussain	Indian National Congress
1957	Istafa Hussain	Indian National Congress
1962	Niyamatullah Ansari	Indian National Congress
1967	Udai Pratap Dubey	Bharatiya Jana Sangh
1969	Ram Lal Bhai	Indian National Congress
1974	Awadhesh Srivastava	Bharatiya Jana Sangh
1977	Awadhesh Srivastava	Janata Party
1980	Sunil Shastri	Indian National Congress (I)
1985	Sunil Shastri	Indian National Congress
1989	Shiv Pratap Shukla	Bharatiya Janata Party
1991	Shiv Pratap Shukla	Bharatiya Janata Party
1993	Shiv Pratap Shukla	Bharatiya Janata Party
1996	Shiv Pratap Shukla	Bharatiya Janata Party
2002	Radha Mohan Das Agarwal	Hindu Mahasabha
2007	Radha Mohan Das Agarwal	Bharatiya Janata Party
2012	Radha Mohan Das Agarwal	Bharatiya Janata Party
2017	Radha Mohan Das Agarwal	Bharatiya Janata Party
2022	Yogi Adityanath	Bharatiya Janata Party

== Election results ==
=== 2027 ===
2027 Uttar Pradesh Legislative Assembly election: Gorakhpur Urban
Party	Candidate	Votes	%	±%
BJP	Yogi Adityanath			
SP				
BSP				
NOTA	None of the above			
Majority				
Turnout				
		Swing		

=== 2022 ===
2022 Uttar Pradesh Legislative Assembly election: Gorakhpur Urban
Party	Candidate	Votes	%	±%
BJP	Yogi Adityanath	165,499	66.18	▲10.33
SP	Subhavati Shukla	62,109	24.84	
BSP	Khawaja Shamsuddin	6,157	3.21	▼7.89
ASP(KR)	Chandrashekhar Azad	5,764	3.06	New
INC	Chetna Pandey	4,288	1.15	▼26.95
NOTA	None of the above	1,194	0.48	▲0.1
Majority		103,390	41.34	▲13.59
Turnout		250,067	53.80	▲2.82
BJP hold		Swing	▲10.33	

=== 2017 ===
2017 Uttar Pradesh Legislative Assembly election: Gorakhpur Urban
Party	Candidate	Votes	%	±%
BJP	Radha Mohan Das Agarwal	122,221	55.85	
INC	Rana Rahul Singh	61,491	28.10	
BSP	Janardan Chaudhary	24,297	11.10	
PECP	Arun Kumar Shrivastava	2,252	1.03	
NOTA	None of the above	839	0.38	
Majority		60,730	27.75	
Turnout		218,831	50.98	
BJP hold		Swing	▲6.66	

=== 2012 ===
2012 Uttar Pradesh Legislative Assembly election: Gorakhpur Urban
Party	Candidate	Votes	%	±%
BJP	Radha Mohan Das Agarwal	81,148	49.19	
SP	Raj Kumari Devi	33,694	20.42	
BSP	Divesh Chandra Srivastava	23,811	14.43	
INC	Narendra Mani Tripathi	11,171	6.77	
PECP	Dr. Vijay Kumar	2,187	1.33	
Majority		47,454	28.77	
Turnout		1,64,973	46.19	
BJP hold		Swing		
