= Braj Bihari Sharma =

Indian politician

Member of Parliament, Rajya Sabha
- In office 1952-1960
- Constituency: Uttar Pradesh

Personal details
- Born: 1897
- Died: 1978 (aged 80–81)
- Party: Indian National Congress

Braj Bihari Sharma (1897-1978) was an Indian politician, a Member of Parliament representing Uttar Pradesh in the Rajya Sabha (the upper house of India's Parliament) for the Indian National Congress.
