= Balihari =

Indian politician

Shri Balihari Babu (died 28 April 2021) was an Indian politician.

He served as a Member of the Rajya Sabha, representing Uttar Pradesh for the Bahujan Samaj Party, from 2006 to 2009.

Later he join Samajwadi party

Babu died from COVID-19 in 2021 during the COVID-19 pandemic in India.
