= Akhilesh Das =

Indian politician

Akhilesh Das Gupta
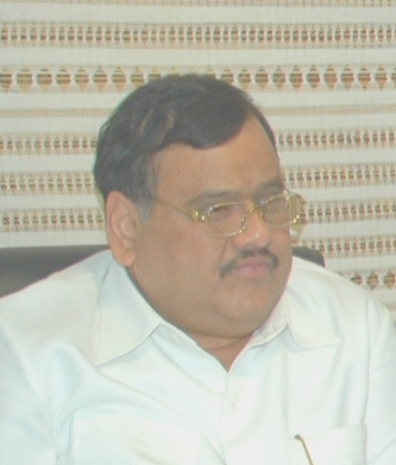

Member of Parliament, Rajya Sabha
- In office November 1996 – November 2014

Minister for Steel
- In office January 2006 – May 2008

Personal details
- Born: 31 March 1961 Bulandshahr, Uttar Pradesh, India
- Died: 12 April 2017 (aged 56) Lucknow, Uttar Pradesh, India
- Party: Indian National Congress (Before April 2008; January 2017–April 2017)
- Other political affiliations: Bahujan Samaj Party (2008–2014)
- Spouse: Alka Das
- Children: Viraj Sagar Das; Sonakshi Das
- Profession: Lawyer, Politician

Akhilesh Das Gupta (31 March 1961 – 12 April 2017) was an educationist, professor, and Indian politician. He was the son of Freedom Fighter Babu Banarasi Das, former Chief Minister of Uttar Pradesh. He was the president of Badminton Association of India, vice president of Badminton Asia Confederation, a member of the Executive Council of Badminton World Federation, and vice president of Indian Olympic Association.

== Early life and education ==
Akhilesh Das Gupta (born on 31 March 1961) attended Colvin Taluqdars College, Lucknow, to earn a Diploma in Public Administration, LL.B., MBA & PhD (Management). He had been a National Level Badminton Player and had represented the state of Uttar Pradesh from 1977 to 1983. He had also represented the country in various International Badminton Tournaments.

== Professional life ==
Akhilesh Das Gupta served as Founder Chancellor of Babu Banarasi Das University, Lucknow in the year 1998. He was the Chairman of Babu Banarasi Das Educational Institutions that provide education to over 30,000 students every year in the fields of Management, Engineering, Dental Sciences, Pharmacy, Law, Architecture and Social Sciences in Lucknow & Delhi. He was Mayor of Lucknow (Uttar Pradesh) from May 1993– Nov 1996 and contributed extensively in the development of the city. He had held country's most prestigious office as 'Member of Parliament'(Rajya Sabha) for 18 years serving three consecutive terms of 6 years each from November 1996 to November 2014. He had held the office of the Minister for Steel from January 2006 till May 2008 under Dr. Manmohan Singh Government during UPA-I. He actively served as secretary of Congress Parliamentary Party between 2003 and 2006 when Sonia Gandhi was heading Congressas well as chairman of the Organizational Election Authority for Congress in Tamil Nadu and Pondicherry, and successfully conducted the grass-roots level organizational elections of the Party in the year 2004–05.

In Uttar Pradesh, he had served as Jt. secretary, general secretary and vice president of the UP Congress Committee, and also chairman, Uttar Pradesh Traders' Cell of the UP Congress, as well as chairman of the Standing Committee of Parliament on Industries. and was the national general secretary of the Bahujan Samaj Party from the year 2008 to 2014.

== Fraud Allegations ==
Akhilesh Das Gupta, along with other higher officials of the Badminton Association of India were accused of fraud and nepotism, by favoring their own children for a goodwill trip to Japan, and were investigated by the CBI. The Japanese Government had sponsored a Badminton tournament in Tokyo as a means of promoting Japanese culture and values amongst Asian youth. The criteria for selection was that players be between 17 and 23 years and that they should have played at the regional or state level in that country.

According to the CBI, Akhilesh Das Gupta, along with other top officials such as Jitender Kochar DCBA general secretary, Harish Ahuja DCBA vice-president, Apinder Sabharwal former secretary of DCBA, Kamal Kumar Thapar former treasurer of DCBA and Harish Mittal former member, connived and had their own kin and wards posing as badminton players to be short-listed for the trip. No advertisement was published or any trial conducted for genuine badminton players. The CBI had completed the investigation and sent its report to the Sports Ministry, Government of India, but no action had been taken thus far.

== Rajya Sabha Election History ==
Position	Party	Constituency	From	To	Tenure
Member of Parliament, Rajya Sabha (1st Term)	INC	Uttar Pradesh	26 November 1996	25 November 2002	5 years, 364 days
Member of Parliament, Rajya Sabha (2nd Term)	INC	Uttar Pradesh	26 November 2002	25 November 2008	5 years, 365 days
Member of Parliament, Rajya Sabha (3rd Term)	BSP	Uttar Pradesh	26 November 2008	25 November 2014	5 years, 364 days

== Death ==
Akhilesh Das Gupta died from a heart attack on 12 April 2017 in the early morning at his residence.

== Extra-curricular activities ==
Akhilesh Das Gupta served as an officer in these organizations:

- President, Badminton Association of India (BAI)
- Chairman, Premier Badminton League (PBL)
- President, Uttar Pradesh Olympic Association (UPOA)
- Vice President, Indian Olympic Association (IOA)
- Vice President, Badminton Asia Confederation (BAC)
- Executive Council, Badminton World Federation (BWF)
