= Ramji Gautam =

Indian politician

Member of Parliament, Rajya Sabha
- Incumbent
- Assumed office 2 November 2020
- Succeeded by: Rajaram
- Constituency: Uttar Pradesh

Party Leader in Rajya Sabha Bahujan Samaj Party
- Incumbent
- Assumed office 2 November 2022
- Constituency: Uttar Pradesh

Personal details
- Born: 1 June 1976 (age 50) Lakhimpur, Uttar Pradesh, India
- Party: Bahujan Samaj Party
- Spouse: Vartika Chaudhary (m. 2008)
- Children: 2 (1 son and 1 daughter)
- Parents: Jagat Narayan (father); Parvati Devi (mother)
- Education: Chaudhary Charan Singh University

Ramji Gautam is an Indian politician and political strategist. He was born in Jatav family. He is currently a Member of Parliament in Rajya Sabha, the Upper House of the Indian Parliament. He has been the National Vice-president and current national coordinator of the Bahujan Samaj Party.He completed his B.E from KN Modi Institute of Technology, Modinagar, Ghaziabad
