= Prem Manohar =

Indian politician 1923–2013

Member of Parliament, Rajya Sabha
- In office 1968-74,1977-80
- Constituency: Uttar Pradesh

Personal details
- Born: 9 October 1923
- Died: 2013 (aged 89–90)
- Party: Janata Party

Prem Manohar (9 October 1923 – 2013) was an Indian politician. He was a Member of Parliament, representing Uttar Pradesh in the Rajya Sabha the upper house of India's Parliament as a member of the Janata Party.
