= Kunj Bihari Lal Rathi =

Indian politician

Member of Parliament, Rajya Sabha
- In office 3 April 1966 – 13 July 1968
- Succeeded by: Mohanlal Gautam
- Constituency: Uttar Pradesh

Personal details
- Born: 17 August 1910
- Died: 13 July 1968 (aged 57)
- Party: Bharatiya Jana Sangh
- Spouse: Narbada Devi
- Children: 1 son, 2 daughters
- Parent: Lal Mangal Chand (father)
- Education: B.A., LL.B

Kunj Bihari Lal Rathi (1910–1968) was a leader of Bharatiya Jana Sangh from Uttar Pradesh. He had served as Member of Rajya Sabha from 1966 to 1968.
