= G. V. L. Narasimha Rao =

Indian politician (born 1964)

Member of Parliament, Rajya Sabha
- In office 03 April 2018 – 02 April 2024
- Preceded by: Pramod Tiwari (INC)
- Succeeded by: Sanjay Seth
- Constituency: Uttar Pradesh

Personal details
- Born: 5 July 1964 (age 61) Ballikurava, Andhra Pradesh, India
- Party: Bharatiya Janata Party
- Spouse: Mydhili Rao
- Parents: G.Venkateswara Rao (father); G. Chowdeswari (mother)
- Education: B.Sc.(Agriculture), P.G. Diploma in Rural Management (PGDRM)
- Alma mater: Agricultural College, Bapatla, Andhra Pradesh; Institute of Rural Management Anand, Anand, Gujarat
- Occupation: Politician, businessman, psephologist

Guntupalli Venkata Lakshmi Narasimha Rao is an Indian politician of the Bharatiya Janata Party (BJP). He was a member of the Rajya Sabha, the upper house of Indian Parliament, representing the state of Uttar Pradesh.

== Early life ==
GVL Narasimha Rao's ancestral village is Ballikurava in Bapatla district of Andhra Pradesh where his father served as Panchayat Sarpanch for three decades. Rao hails from Narasaraopet, headquarter town of Palnadu district, where he studied up to Intermediate. He later did his Agricultural BSc degree in Bapatla Agricultural College and his MBA (PGDRM) from Institute of Rural Management Anand, in Gujarat.

== Political career ==
Rao served as national spokesperson of the central committee of BJP, chaired by former National President Amit Shah and frequently appears on national television networks representing the BJP led by National President J. P. Nadda on important topics. Rao is a senior leader of the BJP in Andhra Pradesh and a member of the party’s Core Committee in Andhra Pradesh deciding party's political and policy position on various issues.

Rao is a Member of various important parliamentary committees; the Standing Committee on Finance, the Committee of Privileges, Consultative Committee of External Affairs and is a Member of the Spices Board, Tobacco Board and Chairman of the Chilli Task Force Committee of the Spices Board, Ministry of Commerce, Government of India.

Rao was elected to the Rajya Sabha from Uttar Pradesh in March 2018.
