= Neki Ram =

Indian freedom fighter

Pandit Neki Ram Sharma

Personal details
- Born: 5 September 1887 Kelanga, Bhiwani
- Died: 8 June 1956 (aged 68)
- Party: Indian National Congress
- Spouse: Tijan

Pandit Neki Ram Sharma was a prominent Indian freedom fighter and politician known for his opposition to British colonial rule and his contributions to India's independence movement. He represented Punjab in the Rajya Sabha, the upper house of India’s Parliament, as a member of the Indian National Congress.

== Early life and education ==
Pandit Neki Ram Sharma was born on September 7, 1887, in Kelanga (now known as Kalinga) village in Rohtak district, Haryana, to Pandit Hariprasad Sharma. He pursued advanced studies in Sanskrit, spending time in Sitapur, Banaras, and Ayodhya in Uttar Pradesh. His exposure to the Indian independence movement began in 1905 at the annual session of the Indian National Congress in Banaras, where he met esteemed leaders like Gopal Krishna Gokhale, Lokmanya Bal Gangadhar Tilak, Lala Lajpat Rai, Surendranath Banerjee, and Madan Mohan Malviya.

== Journey into Freedom Struggle ==
In 1907, inspired by the revolutionary spirit of leaders like Bhagat Singh, Lala Lajpat Rai, and Tilak, Pandit Neki Ram returned to his village, where he began his lifelong struggle against British rule. The sentencing of Tilak in 1908 particularly stirred him, leading him to vow to oppose British rule fervently. During this period, Pandit Neki Ram contemplated armed rebellion, even considering making bombs. However, a meeting with Congress leader Surendranath Banerjee in Calcutta redirected him towards a non-violent path.

== Role in Key Independence Movements ==
Pandit Neki Ram was deeply involved in multiple independence movements, including:

- Non-Cooperation Movement (1920–22): In response to Mahatma Gandhi’s call, he actively participated and was arrested for his involvement in 1921. He had first met Gandhi in 1915 and was inspired by his teachings on nonviolence and the campaign against untouchability.
- Home Rule Movement: He joined the movement and met Pandit Jawaharlal Nehru in 1918, forming a lasting friendship. In June 1918, he was arrested alongside Asaf Ali for his role in the movement.
- Anti-Rowlatt Act Movement (1919): Pandit Neki Ram opposed the oppressive Rowlatt Act and became a leader in the protests.
- Salt Satyagraha (1930–34), Individual Satyagraha (1940–41), and Quit India Movement (1942–44): He played a prominent role in these campaigns and spent a total of 2,200 days in prison due to his relentless opposition to British rule.

== Defiance Against British Attempts to Suppress Him ==
Pandit Neki Ram’s popularity and influence in the Home Rule Movement led the British authorities to try to bribe him with an offer of 25 acres of land, which he rejected.

He famously retorted to the British District Collector,

This entire country is mine; what land will you give me ?

== The Ambala Divisional Political Conference ==
To support the Non-Cooperation Movement, Pandit Neki Ram organized the Ambala Divisional Political Conference on October 22, 1920, in Bhiwani. With an attendance of around 60,000 people, including 50,000 farmers, the event saw the participation of prominent leaders like Mahatma Gandhi, Maulana Abul Kalam Azad, and Kasturba Gandhi.

== Legacy ==
Pandit Neki Ram Sharma remains an activist in India’s freedom struggle history. His participation and campaigns in pushing for independence, justice and against British colonial rule , and his involvement in India’s key movements have contributed to the nation’s transition to freedom.
