= Veer Singh (politician) =

Indian politician

Member of Parliament, Rajya Sabha
- In office 26-Nov-2002 – 26-Nov-2020
- Succeeded by: B. L. Verma
- Constituency: Uttar Pradesh

Personal details
- Party: Bahujan Samaj Party

Veer Singh (born 15/02/1956, Jojkheda, District Jyotiba Phule Nagar (Uttar Pradesh)) a politician from Samajwadi Party, is a Member of the Parliament of India representing Uttar Pradesh in the Rajya Sabha, the upper house of the Indian Parliament.

He resides at Moradabad.
