= Radha Mohan Das Agarwal =

Indian politician (born 1955)

Dr. Radha Mohan Das Agrawal

State In Charge Bharatiya Janata Party
- Incumbent
- In office 2024–2026
- Preceded by: Arun Singh
- Succeeded by: Harish Dwivedi
- Constituency: Karnataka, Rajasthan

Member of Parliament, Rajya Sabha
- Incumbent
- Assumed office 5 July 2022
- Constituency: Uttar Pradesh

Member of Uttar Pradesh Legislative Assembly
- In office March 2002 – 10 March 2022
- Preceded by: Shiv Pratap Shukla
- Succeeded by: Yogi Adityanath
- Constituency: Gorakhpur Urban

Personal details
- Born: 6 March 1955 (age 71) Gorakhpur, Uttar Pradesh, India
- Party: Bharatiya Janata Party (2007-present)
- Other political affiliations: Hindu Mahasabha (until 2007)
- Spouse: Ragini Agrawal (m. 1988)
- Children: 1
- Parent: Dau Das Agrawal (father)
- Education: Institute of Medical Sciences, Banaras Hindu University
- Profession: Politician; Physician

Dr. Radha Mohan Das Agrawal (born 6 March 1955) is the National General Secretary of the Bharatiya Janata Party and a Member of Parliament (Rajya Sabha) from Uttar Pradesh since 5 July 2022, and has been a member of the 14th, 15th, 16th, and 17th Legislative Assembly of Uttar Pradesh. Since 2002, he has represented Gorakhpur Urban (Assembly constituency) as a member of the BJP.

In September 2022, BJP national president J. P. Nadda appointed him as in-charge of the BJP in Lakshadweep and as co-in-charge of the BJP in Kerala. He has been given responsibility as BJP Karnataka State election in-charge for the 2024 Lok Sabha general. BJP declared him as State Organisation Incharge of Karnataka BJP. In addition to Karnataka he has been given responsibility of Rajasthan BJP as well as organisational incharge.

He has been appointed a Member of the Consultative Committee of the Ministry of Finance and a Member of the Standing Committee of Finance for 2022–23. Furthermore, he has also been appointed as a member of the Hindi Advisory Committee of the Ministry of Parliamentary Affairs since 2022. He is nominated as a Member of the Council of the National Institute of Pharmaceutical Education and Research and a Member of the Joint Parliamentary Committee on the Jan Vishwas Bill 2022. In March 2023, he was elected to the Member Standing Committee on Public Undertaking. Since 2024 he is member of Business Advisory committee of Rajyasabha. On 9 August 2024 he has been appointed as Member on Joint Parliamentary committee on Waqf Board Amendment bill -2024. On 27 September 2024 he has been nominated as Chairman of Standing Committee on Home Affairs. On 21 October 2024 he was nominated as Member of Consultative committee of Ministry of Health and family welfare. He has again nominated as Chairman Standing committee on Home Affairs for 2nd consecutive year on 1 October 2025.

== Personal life ==
Dr. Agrawal was born on 6 March 1955, in Gorakhpur to Late. Daw Das Agrawal. He married Ragini Agrawal on 20 January 1988 and has a pediatrician daughter. He is also a pediatrician. Agrawal did his MBBS in 1976 and his MD in pediatrics in 1981, both from the Banaras Hindu University.

== Political career ==
Agrawal's political journey started during college when he joined the Rashtriya Swayamsevak Sangh and later joined student politics. He was elected president of the Junior Doctors Association in 1974 and later general secretary of the BHU Teachers Association (BHUTA). He was then chosen as General Secretary of the Federation of Central University Teacher's Unions by profession. In 1986, after resigning as Asst. Professor of BHU started a clinic in Gorakhpur, inaugurated by the National President of the then Janata Party, Chandra Shekhar, who became Prime Minister of India. He led Kashmir Bachao Manch, Swadeshi Jagran Manch, and Pragya Prawah as Vibhaag Sangyojak. He served as a deputy secretary of Vishwa Samvad Kendra at Gorakhprant of RSS.

His political activities started in 1998 at the invitation of Yogi Adityanath, the then Mahant of Gorakhnath Math. He became his election convenor of the Gorakhpur Urban (Assembly constituency) when Yogi was contesting as a BJP MP candidate from Gorakhpur for the first time. He was elected as an MLA from Gorakhpur Urban (Vidhan Sabha constituency) in the 14th Legislative Assembly of Uttar Pradesh (2002) from a ticket of Hindu Mahasabha. He defeated Samajwadi Party candidate Pramod Kumar Tekriwal by a margin of 18,448 (18.67%) votes.

Before the 2007 elections, he joined the Bharatiya Janata Party. In the 15th Legislative Assembly of Uttar Pradesh (2007) elections, he again contested from Gorakhpur Urban (Assembly constituency) and was elected MLA by defeating Bhanu Prakash Mishra (Samajwadi Party) by a margin of 22,392 (24.66%) votes.

In his 3rd Vidhan Sabha election (2012), he won by a margin of 48,000, and in the fourth election in 2017, he again increased his margin to 62,000.

In 2022, the BJP high command decided to nominate Yogi Adityanath as an MLA candidate for Gorakhpur. The BJP national president, J. P. Nadda, requested he vacate the seat, which he gladly accepted.

The BJP high command nominated him as a BJP candidate for the Rajya Sabha election on 31 May 2022, which he won unopposed.

Recently, on 4 April 2023, Dr. Agrawal was acquitted of a criminal case under Articles 147, 323, 352, and 447 of the Indian Penal Code. He was also acquitted under Articles 3 and 4 of the Prevention of Damage to Public Property Act, which Dr. Agrawal said was a result of political jealousy and rivalry. Two other cases were also filed against him but were later dropped.

From 30 January 2023 till 17th August 2026 Dr. Agrawal worked as National General Secretary of the BJP. Dr. Agrawal has been given the responsibility of Karnataka BJP Election In-Charge for the 2024 Lok Sabha. Since July 2024 he is BJP Rajasthan incharge as well.
