= Virendra Bhatia =

Indian politician

Personal details
- Born: 22 April 1947 Sialkot, Punjab, British India
- Died: 24 May 2010 (aged 63) New Delhi, India
- Party: Samajwadi Party
- Spouse: Saroj Bhatia
- Children: Gaurav Bhatia and one daughter

Virendra Bhatia (22 April 1947 – 24 May 2010) was a politician from the Samajwadi Party and a Member of the Parliament of India represented Uttar Pradesh in the Rajya Sabha, the upper house of the Indian Parliament. His son Gaurav Bhatia is the national spokesperson of the Bharatiya Janata Party.

Bhatia died on 24 May 2010 in Apollo Hospital in New Delhi after a short illness.
