= Banarasi Das =

Indian politician (1912–1985)

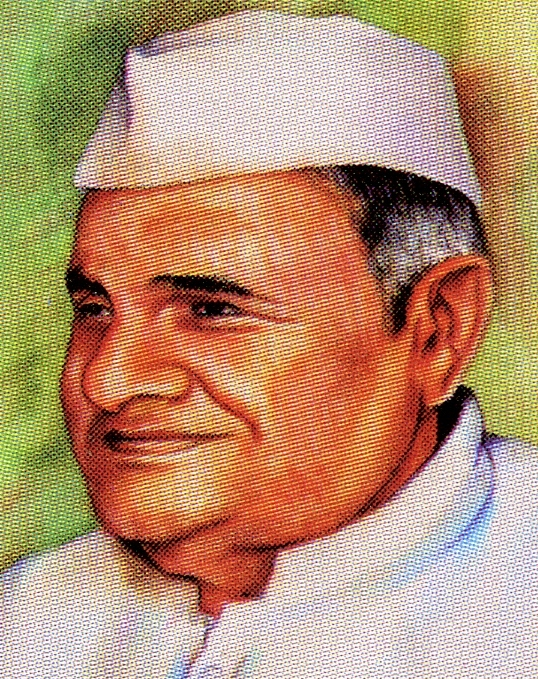

11th Chief Minister of Uttar Pradesh
- In office 28 February 1979 – 17 February 1980
- Preceded by: Ram Naresh Yadav
- Succeeded by: V. P. Singh

Personal details
- Born: 18 July 1912 Utarawli, United Provinces of Agra and Oudh, British India
- Died: 3 August 1985 (aged 73) India
- Party: Janata Party

Banarasi Das, popularly known as Babu Banarasi Das (8 July 1912 – 3 August 1985) was an Indian politician and Chief Minister of Uttar Pradesh. He was from Janata Party.

== Career ==
Banarasi Das was a freedom fighter. He went to jail many times during India's freedom struggle. He was elected to Uttar Pradesh Vidhan Sabha in 1977 as member of Janata Party from Hapur or Khurja, both those seats having elected a member named Banarsi Das. He was Chief Minister from 28 February 1979 to 17 February 1980. He joined Charan Singh's Janata Party (Secular) when the Janata Party split. He lost 1980 Vidhan Sabha election.

== Personal life ==
Banarasi Das was born in Utarawli, Bulandshahr, Uttar Pradesh. Banarasi Das was married and had five sons and five daughters. Two of his sons followed his footsteps. The elder one Harendra Agarwal was the former member of legislative council & is active in Indian politics. The youngest son Late Dr Akhilesh Das Gupta was a former Rajya sabha MP and ex national general secretary of Bahujan Samaj Party and was Minister of State in Manmohan singh government.

== Legacy ==
An Indian postal stamp featuring Das was issued in 2013. Babu Banarasi Das University, Lucknow, Babu Banarasi Das Indoor Stadium, Babu Banarasi Das Northern India Institute of Technology, Babu Banarasi Das Institute of Technology and Management, Babu Banarasi Das College of Dental Sciences, in Uttar Pradesh are named in his honor.

Political offices
Preceded by Ram Naresh Yadav	Chief Minister of Uttar Pradesh; 28 February 1979 – 17 February 1980	Succeeded by President's Rule; Administered by the Governor of Uttar Pradesh, Ganpat Rao devji Tapase, 17 February 1977 – 27 February 1980; Chandeshwar Prasad Narayan Singh, 28 February 1980 – 9 June 1980 title/post subsequently held by- Vishwanath Pratap Singh
