= Sakal Deep Rajbhar =

Indian politician

Sakal Deep Rajbhar सकल दीप राजभर

Member of Parliament, Rajya Sabha
- In office 2018–2024
- Preceded by: Munquad Ali
- Succeeded by: Sangeeta Balwant
- Constituency: Uttar Pradesh

Personal details
- Born: 1 January 1956 (age 70) Sikandarpur (Uttar Pradesh)
- Party: Bharatiya Janata Party

Sakal Deep Rajbhar (born 1 January 1956) is an Indian politician. He is former Member of Parliament Rajya Sabha representing Uttar Pradesh in the Rajya Sabha the upper house of India's Parliament representing the Bharatiya Janata Party.

== Early life ==
Sakal Deep Rajbhar is one of the oldest BJP leaders in the state and has been associated with the Sangh for a long time. Sakaldeep Rajbhar, resident of the Belthra road assembly constituency, had contested the assembly elections in 2002, but had to face defeat. Graduating, he received education from Inter, had also contested the election of Gram Pradhan in 1995 and was also involved in agricultural work. Salkadeep has also worked for Moharruer in Tehsil Rajbhar. After securing the Belthra Road Legislative Assembly, Sakladip Rajbhar had contested a ticket from Sikandarpur in the Legislative Assembly elections in 2017, but he did not get the ticket.
