= Ranbir Singh Latayan =

Indian chemist, academic administrator and politician (born 1925)

Ranbir Singh (born 30 June 1925) was an Indian chemist, academic administrator and politician. Singh served as the principal of the Janta Vedic College (formerly known as Jat Vedic College), Baraud, Uttar Pradesh, India from 1963 to 1972. He was the founding principal of Sri Aurobindo College. From 1994 to 2000, he served as Member of Parliament in the Rajya Sabha.

== Background ==
Ranbir Singh was the third child of late Ch. Kanwal Singh and late Mrs. Manbhari Devi, born in village Titawi, district Muzaffarnagar, Uttar Pradesh, India.

== Education and teaching ==
After completing his schooling at Titawi, Baghra, and Muzaffarnagar, he did his B.Sc. and M.Sc. from Birla College of Technology and Science, Pilani in 1949. He received his Ph.D. in the field of Organic Chemistry from Banaras Hindu University, Varanasi in 1955. After completing his Ph.D., Singh was appointed as a faculty member in the Chemistry Department at Sagar University, Sagar, Madhya Pradesh (now Dr. Hari Singh Gour University, Sagar). In 1957, Dr. Singh received a postdoctoral fellowship in the Chemistry Department at Johns Hopkins University. On his return to India in 1960, he resumed his faculty member position at Sagar University and taught there till 1963.

== Administration ==
In 1963, Singh became the principal of Jat Vedic College, Baraut, Uttar Pradesh. He was the fourth principal in the college's history and the youngest so far. After 9 years of service, he left to become the founding principal of Sri Aurobindo College in New Delhi where he served from 1972 to 1988.

== Rajya Sabha ==
Singh was nominated as Member of Parliament in Rajya Sabha to represent Uttar Pradesh from 1994 to 2000. During this period, he also served as the president of the BJP working committee of Western UP in 1996.
