= Sohan Lal Dhusiya =

Indian politician

Member of Parliament, Rajya Sabha
- In office 1984–1990
- Constituency: Uttar Pradesh

Member of Parliament, Lok Sabha
- In office 1952–1957
- Constituency: Basti Distt. (Central East) cum Gorakhpur Distt

Personal details
- Born: 1 July 1923
- Died: 18 February 2005 (aged 81)
- Party: Indian National Congress
- Spouse: Chhaya Devi

Sohan Lal Dhusiya (1923–2005) was an Indian politician. He was a Member of Parliament, representing Uttar Pradesh in the Rajya Sabha the upper house of India's Parliament as a member of the Indian National Congress.
