= Kapil Verma =

Indian politician (1928–2016)

Member of Parliament, Rajya Sabha
- In office 1985–1992
- Constituency: Uttar Pradesh

Personal details
- Born: 21 March 1928
- Died: 9 January 2016 (aged 87)
- Party: Indian National Congress

Kapil Verma (21 March 1928 – 9 January 2016) was an Indian politician. He was a Member of Parliament, representing Uttar Pradesh in the Rajya Sabha the upper house of India's Parliament as a member of the Indian National Congress. Verma died on 9 January 2016, at the age of 87.
