= Veer Pal Singh Yadav =

Indian politician

Shri Veer Pal Singh Yadav is a politician from the Samajwadi Party and a former member of the Parliament of India, representing Uttar Pradesh in the Rajya Sabha.

On 8 March 2010 seven members of parliament (MPs) of Rajya Sabha, including Yadav, tore the copies of the Women's Reservation Bill, snatched the microphones on the chairman's podium and climbed onto the reporters’ table. The following day, Rajya Sabha unanimously suspended Yadav along with other six MPs for their unruly behaviour in the house that day. The motion for their suspension was moved by Minister of State for Parliamentary Affairs Prithviraj Chavan and was passed by a voice vote. The action was taken under Rule 256 of the House, for showing total disregard for the dignity of council and authority of the chair by obstructing the business of the house. The last time a member was suspended for unruly behaviour was in 1987.
