= Ambeth Rajan =

Indian politician

MP of Rajya Sabha for Uttar Pradesh
- In office 5 July 2010 – 4 July 2016

Personal details
- Party: Naam Tamilar Katchi
- Other political affiliations: Bahujan Samaj Party

Ambeth Rajan, a former associate of Bahujan Samaj Party’s founder Kanshi Ram, joined Seeman’s Naam Tamilar Katchi in Chennai earlier this week. Ambeth Rajan (born 9 February 1956 in Mayiladuthurai, Mayiladuthurai district (Tamil Nadu) is a Member of the Parliament of India represented Uttar Pradesh in the Rajya Sabha, the upper house of the Indian Parliament.

He resides at Noida.

== Election History ==
=== Rajya Sabha ===
Position	Party	Constituency	From	To	Tenure
Member of Parliament, Rajya Sabha (1st Term)	BSP	Uttar Pradesh	26 Sept 2007	4 July 2010	2 years, 281 days
Member of Parliament, Rajya Sabha (2nd Term)	BSP	Uttar Pradesh	5 July 2010	4 July 2016	5 years, 365 days
