= Jashaud Singh Bisht =

Indian politician

Member of Parliament, Rajya Sabha
- In office 1952–1962
- Constituency: Uttar Pradesh

Personal details
- Born: 1 October 1897
- Died: 24 May 1971 (aged 73)
- Party: Indian National Congress

Jashaud Singh Bisht was an Indian politician. He was a Member of Parliament representing Uttar Pradesh in the Rajya Sabha the upper house of India's Parliament as member of the Indian National Congress.
