= Alia Zuberi =

Indian politician

Alia Zuberi Kumari, Ms, Dr

MP of Rajya Sabha for Uttar Pradesh
- In office 11 November 1989 – 4 July 1992
- Constituency: Uttar Pradesh

Personal details
- Born: 1 January 1953 (age 73) India
- Party: Indian National Congress
- Children: 0

Alia Zuberi also known as Kumari Alia (Ms. Alia) is an Indian politician and ex-Member of Parliament from Uttar Pradesh. She has been the delegate of India under Govt of India's Haj Goodwill delegation for Saudi Arabia in 2005 and 2007. She has been elected member of the All India Congress Committee many times.
