= Banwari Lal Kanchhal =

Indian politician

Shri Banwari Lal Kanchhal a politician from Samajwadi Party is a Member of the Parliament of India representing Uttar Pradesh in the Rajya Sabha, the upper house of the Indian Parliament. He was elected for the term 2006-2012 but resigned in 2009 after joining BSP.
