= Om Prakash Tyagi =

Indian politician

Om Prakash Tyagi (1912–1986) was a leader of Bharatiya Jan Sangh from Uttar Pradesh. He was a member of the 4th Lok Sabha from Moradabad and 6th Lok Sabha from Bahraich. He lost from Bahraich in 1971 and 1980. After losing his bid for a place in Lok Sabha in 1971, he served as a member of the Rajya Sabha from 1972 to 1977.

He was born in 1912 in Bulandshahr District. He studied at Banaras Hindu University. He took active part in the "Quit India" movement in 1942 and was imprisoned. He was associated with Arya Samaj and RSS. He was founder President of Arya Veer Dal. Later he joined Jan Sangh. He was involved with Bharatiya Mazdoor Sangh too . He wrote a number of books on religion, social and political themes. In 1978 he introduced Freedom of Religion Bill as a private bill in Lok Sabha to make 'fraudulent' conversions illegal.
