= Sitaram Jaipuria =

Indian politician

Member of Parliament, Rajya Sabha
- In office 1962–1974
- Constituency: Uttar Pradesh

Personal details
- Born: 27 May 1926
- Died: 23 July 1985 (aged 59)
- Party: Independent

Sitaram Jaipuria was an Indian politician. He was a Member of Parliament representing Uttar Pradesh in the Rajya Sabha the upper house of India's Parliament as an independent.
