= Shanti Tyagi =

Indian politician

Member of Parliament, Rajya Sabha
- In office 1985–1992
- Constituency: Uttar Pradesh

Personal details
- Born: 1920
- Died: 19 March 2001 (aged 80–81)
- Party: Indian National Congress
- Spouse: Swadesh Tyagi

Shanti Tyagi (1920-2001) was an Indian politician. He was a Member of Parliament, representing Uttar Pradesh in the Rajya Sabha the upper house of India's Parliament as a member of the Indian National Congress.
