= R. B. S. Varma =

Indian politician and academic

R. B. S. Varma is a leader of Bharatiya Janata Party from Uttar Pradesh. He was member of Rajya Sabha from 1994 to 2006. He also served as a member of Uttar Pradesh Legislative Assembly from 1977 to 1980 and 1990 to 1992. He completed MSC in chemistry and Ph.D. and served as professor.
