= Sukhdev Prasad =

8th Governor of Rajasthan
- In office 20 February 1988 – 3 February 1990
- Preceded by: Vasantdada Patil
- Succeeded by: Milap Chand Jain

Member of Parliament (Rajya Sabha)
- In office 1966-78
- In office 82-88
- Constituency: Uttar Pradesh

Personal details
- Born: 20 March 1921
- Died: 19 May 1995 (aged 74)
- Party: Indian National Congress
- Spouse: Sajani Dev
- Children: 6 Sons and 5 daughters

Sukhdev Prasad (1921-1995) was an Indian politician. He was a member of the Rajya Sabha, the upper house of the Parliament of India representing Uttar Pradesh as a member of the Indian National Congress for 3 terms. He was the Union Deputy Minister for Steel and Mines from 1973 to 1977.
