= Krishna Kaul (politician) =

Indian politician (1921–2008)

Member of Parliament, Rajya Sabha
- In office 1982–1988
- Constituency: Uttar Pradesh

Personal details
- Born: Krishna Kaul; 20 November 1921 Lucknow, British India
- Died: 13 December 2008 (aged 87)
- Party: Indian National Congress

Krishna Kaul (20 November 1921 – 13 December 2008) was an Indian politician. She was a Member of Parliament, Uttar Pradesh in the Rajya Sabha the upper house of India's Parliament as a member of the Indian National Congress.

Kaul died on 13 December 2008, at the age of 87.
