= Tarkeshwar Pandey =

Indian politician (1910–1989)

Tarkeshwar Pandey (1910–1989) was an Indian Member of Parliament from 1952 to 1977. He was member of Rajya Sabha between 1952 and 1971. Between 1972 and 1977 he represented Salempur.
