= Hira Vallabh Tripathi =

Indian politician (1902–1982)

Member of Parliament, Rajya Sabha
- In office 1957-1972
- Constituency: Uttar Pradesh

Member of Parliament, Lok Sabha
- In office 1952-1957
- Constituency: Muzaffarnagar South, Uttar Pradesh

Personal details
- Born: 1902 Kankhal, North-Western Provinces, British India
- Died: 1982 (aged 79–80)
- Party: Indian National Congress

Hira Vallabh Dutt Tripathi born August 1902 in Kankhal, was an Indian politician, lawyer, and trade unionist. Son of Pandit Padma Dutt Tripathi, he was a member of the Indian National Congress and held various roles in cooperative banking, labor unions, and municipal administration in Uttar Pradesh. He served as Chairman of the Municipal Board, Haridwar, and was associated with the I.N.T.U.C., U.P.C.C., and A.I.C.C..
