= List of current MPs from Kerala =

Member of parliament in India refers to persons who serve in the Indian parliament. These include:

- Member of Parliament, Lok Sabha: Representative of the Indian voters to the Lok Sabha, the lower house of the Parliament of India.
- Member of Parliament, Rajya Sabha: Representative of the Indian states to the upper house of the Parliament of India (Rajya Sabha).

In addition to the 29 MPs representing the state in the upper and lower houses, there are 4 MPs from Keralam who have either been nominated or elected from other states . Totally there are 33 MPs working for Kerala and representing Kerala in both houses in Parliament.

== List of Lok Sabha MPs from Kerala ==
The Lok Sabha is the lower house of the Parliament of India and there are 20 Lok Sabha MPs from Kerala

Keys:

UDF (18) INC (14) IUML (2) RSP(1) KEC(1)

LDF (1) CPI(M) (1)

NDA (1) BJP (1)

| No. | Constituency | Name of Elected M.P. | Alliance | Party Affiliation |
|---|---|---|---|---|
| 1. | Kasaragod | Rajmohan Unnithan | UDF | INC |
| 2. | Kannur | K. Sudhakaran | UDF | INC |
| 3. | Vatakara | Shafi Parambil | UDF | INC |
| 4. | Wayanad | Priyanka Gandhi Vadra | UDF | INC |
| 5. | Kozhikode | M. K. Raghavan | UDF | INC |
| 6. | Ponnani | M. P. Abdussamad Samadani | UDF | IUML |
| 7. | Malappuram | E. T. Muhammed Basheer | UDF | IUML |
| 8. | Palakkad | V. K. Sreekandan | UDF | INC |
| 9. | Alathur | K Radhakrishnan | LDF | CPI(M) |
| 10. | Thrissur | Suresh Gopi | NDA | BJP |
| 11. | Chalakudy | Benny Behanan | UDF | INC |
| 12. | Ernakulam | Hibi Eden | UDF | INC |
| 13. | Idukki | Dean Kuriakose | UDF | INC |
| 14. | Kottayam | K.Francis George | UDF | KC |
| 15. | Alappuzha | K C Venugopal | UDF | INC |
| 16. | Mavelikkara | Kodikunnil Suresh | UDF | INC |
| 17. | Pathanamthitta | Anto Antony Punnathaniyil | UDF | INC |
| 18. | Kollam | N. K. Premachandran | UDF | RSP |
| 19. | Attingal | Adoor Prakash | UDF | INC |
| 20. | Thiruvananthapuram | Shashi Tharoor | UDF | INC |

== List of Rajya Sabha MPs from Kerala ==
The Rajya Sabha is the upper house of the Parliament of India and there are 9 Rajya Sabha MPs from Kerala.

Keys: LDF (6) CPI(M) (3) CPI (2) KC(M) (1)

UDF (3) INC (1) IUML (2)

| S.No | Name | Alliance | Party | Date of Appointment | Date of Retirement |
|---|---|---|---|---|---|
| 8. | P.P. Suneer | LDF | CPI | 1 July 2024 | 30 June 2030 |
| 7. | Jose K Mani | LDF | KCM | 1 July 2024 | 30 June 2030 |
| 1. | Dr. John Brittas | LDF | CPIM | 24 April 2021 | 23 April 2027 |
| 2. | Dr. V. Sivadasan | LDF | CPIM | 24 April 2021 | 23 April 2027 |
| 3. | P. V. Abdul Wahab | UDF | IUML | 24 April 2021 | 23 April 2027 |
| 9. | Haris Beeran | UDF | IUML | 1 July 2024 | 30 June 2030 |
| 4. | Adv. P. Santhosh Kumar | LDF | CPI | 4 April 2022 | 3 April 2028 |
| 5. | Adv. A. A. Rahim | LDF | CPIM | 4 April 2022 | 3 April 2028 |
| 6. | Jebi Mather Hisham | UDF | INC | 4 April 2022 | 3 April 2028 |

== List of MPs from Kerala who were nominated or elected in other states ==
In addition to the 29 MPs representing the state in the upper and lower houses, there is 1 Keralite who have either been nominated or elected in other states.

== See also ==
- Kerala Council of Ministers
- 2021 Indian Rajya Sabha elections
- 2019 Indian general election in Kerala
- List of Rajya Sabha members from Kerala
- List of nominated members of the Rajya Sabha
