= 2021 Rajya Sabha elections =

Elections for the upper house of Indian Parliament

- February – November 2021

17 (Note: Including 13 casual vacancies) of the 233 (Note: excluding 12 nominated seats) elected seats in the Rajya Sabha 121 (Note: out of 241 (excluding 4 vacancies and including 12 nominated seats)) total seats needed for a majority
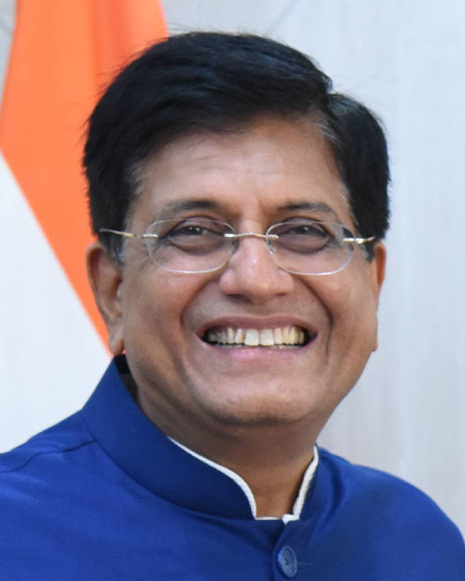

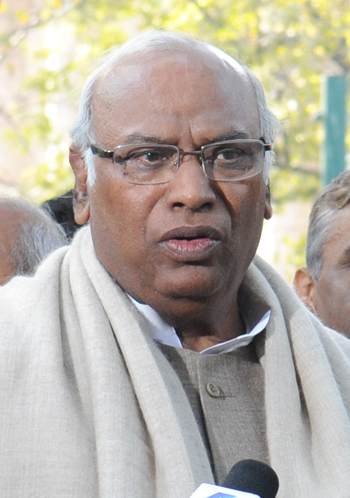
	First party	Second party
Leader	Piyush Goyal	Mallikarjun Kharge
Party	BJP	INC
Alliance	NDA	UPA
Leader since	14 July 2021	16 February 2021
Seats before	84 (Note: excluding 8 nominated members)	35
Seats after	88 (Note: excluding 9 nominated members)	34
Seat change	▲4	▼1
Alliance seats before	107 (Note: excluding 12 nominated members)	50
Alliance seats after	107 (Note: excluding 12 nominated members)	52
Seat change	Steady	▲2
Majority before election
None
Majority after
election
None

Rajya Sabha elections were held throughout 2021, to elect new members to fill vacancies in the Rajya Sabha, the Indian Parliament's upper chamber. Members sit for staggered terms lasting six years, with elections every year but almost a third of the 233 designates up for election every two years.

Elections to the 4 vacant seats from Jammu and Kashmir were not held in February as the union territory is under President's rule and the assembly had been dissolved. These were held later in 2025.

== Results ==
Alliance/ Party			Seats	+/–			
Alliance/ Party				NDA	Bharatiya Janata Party	6	+4
All India Anna Dravida Munnetra Kazhagam	0	-4		NDA			
Total	6	0		NDA			
UPA		Dravida Munnetra Kazhagam	3	+3			
UPA		Indian National Congress	1	-1			
UPA		Indian Union Muslim League	1	0			
UPA		Kerala Congress (M)	1	0			
UPA	Total		6	+2			
Others		All India Trinamool Congress	3	0			
Others		Communist Party of India (Marxist)	2	+1			

== Members retiring & Elected ==
=== Kerala ===
Seat No.	Previous MP	Previous Party	Date of retirement	Elected MP	Party	Appointing date	Ref.
1	K. K. Ragesh	Communist Party of India (Marxist)	21-Apr-2021	John Brittas	Communist Party of India (Marxist)	24-Apr-2021	
2	Vayalar Ravi	Indian National Congress	21-Apr-2021	V. Sivadasan	Communist Party of India (Marxist)	24-Apr-2021	
3	P. V. Abdul Wahab	Indian Union Muslim League	21-Apr-2021	P. V. Abdul Wahab	Indian Union Muslim League	24-Apr-2021	

=== Puducherry ===
Seat No.	Previous MP	Previous Party	Date of retirement	Elected MP	Party	Appointing date	Ref.
1	N Gokulakrishnan	All India Anna Dravida Munnetra Kazhagam	06-Oct-2021	S Selvaganapathy	Bharatiya Janata Party	7 October 2021	

=== By-elections ===
Aside from automatic elections, unforeseen vacancies caused by members' resignation, death or disqualification, are unless a few months before the expected natural expiry of the term of tenure, filled via by-elections, which for the Rajya Sabha often take some months to organise.

==== Assam ====
- On 21 November 2020 Biswajit Daimary resigned.
- Biswajit Daimary Elected As MLA.

S.No	Former MP	Party	Date of Vacancy	Elected MP	Party	Date of Appointment	Date of retirement
1	Biswajit Daimary	Bodoland People's Front	21 November 2020	Biswajit Daimary	Bharatiya Janata Party	22 February 2021	9 April 2026
2	Biswajit Daimary	Bharatiya Janata Party	12 May 2021	Sarbananda Sonowal	Bharatiya Janata Party	27 September 2021	9 April 2026

==== Gujarat ====
- On 25 November 2020 Ahmed Patel died.
- On 1 December 2020 Abhay Bharadwaj died.

S.No	Former MP	Party	Date of Vacancy	Elected MP	Party	Date of Appointment	Date of retirement
1	Ahmed Patel	Indian National Congress	25 November 2020	Dineshchandra Anavadiya	Bharatiya Janata Party	23 February 2021	18 August 2023
2	Abhay Bharadwaj	Bharatiya Janata Party	1 December 2020	Rambhai Mokariya	Bharatiya Janata Party	23 February 2021	21 June 2026

==== Kerala ====
- On 9 January 2021 Jose K. Mani resigned.

S.No	Former MP	Party	Date of Vacancy	Elected MP	Party	Date of Appointment	Date of retirement
1	Jose K. Mani	Kerala Congress (M)	9 January 2021	Jose K. Mani	Kerala Congress (M)	24-Nov-2021	01-Jul-2024

==== West Bengal ====
- On 12 February 2021, Dinesh Trivedi resigned.
- Manas Bhunia Elected As MLA.
- On 15 September 2021, Arpita Ghosh resigned.

S.No	Former MP	Party	Date of Vacancy	Elected MP	Party	Date of Appointment	Date of retirement
1	Dinesh Trivedi	All India Trinamool Congress	12-Feb-2021	Jawhar Sircar	All India Trinamool Congress	03-Aug-2021	02-Apr-2026
2	Manas Bhunia	All India Trinamool Congress	9-May-2021	Sushmita Dev	All India Trinamool Congress	27-Sep-2021	18-Aug-2023
3	Arpita Ghosh	All India Trinamool Congress	15-Sept-2021	Luizinho Faleiro	All India Trinamool Congress	24-Nov-2021	02-Apr-2026

==== Tamil Nadu ====
- On 24 March 2021, A. Mohammedjan died.
- On 10 May 2021, K. P. Munusamy Resigned Due To Election As MLA.
- On 10 May 2021, R. Vaithilingam Resigned Due To Election As MLA.

S.No	Former MP	Party	Date of Vacancy	Elected MP	Party	Date of Appointment	Date of retirement
1	A. Mohammedjan	All India Anna Dravida Munnetra Kazhagam	24-Mar-2021	M. M. Abdulla	Dravida Munnetra Kazhagam	06-Sept-2021	24-Jul-2025
2	K. P. Munusamy	All India Anna Dravida Munnetra Kazhagam	10-May-2021	Kanimozhi NVN Somu	Dravida Munnetra Kazhagam	27-Sep-2021	02-Apr-2026
3	R. Vaithilingam	All India Anna Dravida Munnetra Kazhagam	10-May-2021	K. R. N. Rajeshkumar	Dravida Munnetra Kazhagam	27-Sep-2021	29-Jun-2022

==== Maharashtra ====
- On 16 May 2021, Rajeev Satav died.

S.No	Former MP	Party	Date of Vacancy	Elected MP	Party	Date of Appointment	Date of retirement
1	Rajeev Satav	Indian National Congress	16 May 2021	Rajani Patil	Indian National Congress	27-Sep-2021	02-Apr-2026

==== Madhya Pradesh ====
- On 7 July 2021, Thawar Chand Gehlot resigned due to his appointment as Governor of Karnataka.

S.No	Former MP	Party	Date of Vacancy	Elected MP	Party	Date of Appointment	Date of retirement
1	Thawar Chand Gehlot	Bharatiya Janata Party	07-Jul-2021	L. Murugan	Bharatiya Janata Party	27-Sep-2021	02-Apr-2024

== Nominations ==
=== Nominated members ===
- On 16 March 2021, Swapan Dasgupta resigned.
- On 9 May 2021, Raghunath Mohapatra died

S.No	Former MP	Party	Date of Vacancy	Elected MP	Party	Date of Appointment	Date of retirement
1	Swapan Dasgupta	Nominated	16-Mar-2021	Swapan Dasgupta	Nominated (BJP whip)	02-Jun-2021	24-Apr-2022
2	Raghunath Mohapatra	Nominated (BJP whip)	9-May-2021	Mahesh Jethmalani	Nominated (BJP whip)	02-Jun-2021	13-Jul-2024

== See also ==
- List of current members of the Rajya Sabha
- Member of the Legislative Assembly (India)
- List of members of the 17th Lok Sabha
- 2021 elections in India
- 2022 Punjab Legislative Assembly election
- 2021 Legislative Council elections
