= List of Rajya Sabha members from Kerala =

Upper house members from Kerala

The list of current and past Rajya Sabha members from the Kerala State. State elect 9 members for the term of 6 years and indirectly elected by the state legislators, since year 1956.

== Alphabetical list of all Rajya Sabha members from Kerala state ==
Alphabetical list by last name

The list is incomplete.

- Star (*) represents current Rajya Sabha members from KL State.

Name (alphabetical last name)	Party	Date of appointment	Date of retirement	Term	Notes
Joy Abraham	KC(M)	2 July 2012	1 July 2018	1	
M. P. Achuthan	CPI	22 April 2009	21 April 2015	1	
A K Antony	INC	3 April 1985	2 April 1991	1	
A K Antony	INC	3 April 1991	2 April 1996	2	Resigned 22 March 1995
A K Antony	INC	30 May 2005	2 April 2010	3	Bye-2005
A K Antony	INC	3 April 2010	2 April 2016	4	
A K Antony	INC	3 April 2016	2 April 2022	5	
Binoy Viswam	CPI	2 July 2018	1 July 2024	1	*
M A Baby	CPI(M)	3 April 1986	2 April 1992	1	
M A Baby	CPI(M)	3 April 1992	2 April 1998	1	
K.N. Balagopal	CPI(M)	3 April 2010	2 April 2016	1	
E. Balanandan	CPI(M)	2 July 1988	1 July 1994	1	
E. Balanandan	CPI(M)	2 July 1994	1 July 2000	2	
Elamaram Kareem	CPI(M)	2 July 2018	1 July 2024	1	*
N. E. Balaram	CPI	22 April 1985	21 April 1991	1	
N. E. Balaram	CPI	22 April 1991	21 April 1997	2	dea 16 July 1994
Thalekunnil Basheer	INC	20 July 1977	21 April 1979	1	bye 1977 M V A Seyid
Thalekunnil Basheer	INC	22 April 1979	21 April 1985	2	29 December 1984
E. K. Imbichi Bava	CPI(M)	3 April 1952	2 April 1954	1	Madras State
Jose K. Mani	KC(M)	2 July 2018	9 January 2021	1	Resigned on 9 January 2021
Jose K. Mani	KC(M)	1 December 2021	1 July 2024	2	* bye 2021
Jose K. Mani	KC(M)	2 July 2024	01 Jul 2030	3	
Bharati Udayabhanu	INC	3 April 1954	2 April 1958	1	Travancore Cochin
Bharati Udayabhanu	INC	3 April 1958	2 April 1964	2	Travancore Cochin
Bharati Udayabhanu	INC	3 April 1958	2 April 1964	2	Travancore Cochin
John Brittas	CPI(M)	24 April 2021	23 April 2027	1	*
K Chandrasekharan	Socialist Party (India)	17 April 1967	2 April 1970	1	bye 1967
K Chathunni Master	CPI(M)	22 April 1979	21 April 1985	1	
J. Chitharanjan	CPI	22 April 1997	21 April 2003	1	
K. Damodaran	CPI	3 April 1964	2 April 1970	1	
Devaki Gopidas	INC	3 April 1962	2 April 1968	1	
K Gopalan	OTH	2 July 1982	1 July 1988	1	
K C George	KSC	3 April 1952	2 April 1954	1	res 5 March 1954 Travancore Cochin
K Ahammed Haji	INC	3 April 1998	2 April 2004	1	dea 12 May 2003
C Haridas	INC	3 April 1980	2 April 1986	1	
K. E. Ismail	CPI	2 July 2006	1 July 2012	1	
M. M. Jacob	INC	2 July 1982	1 July 1988	1	
M. M. Jacob	INC	2 July 1988	1 July 1994	1	
O J Joseph	CPI(M)	3 April 1980	2 April 1986	1	
Aravindakshan Kaimal	OTH	17 April 1967	2 April 1968	1	bye 1967 M N Nair
S Chattanatha Karayalar	INC	3 April 1952	2 April 1958	1	Travancore Cochin
S Chattanatha Karayalar	INC	3 April 1958	2 April 1964	1	Travancore Cochin
K. Karunakaran	INC	25 April 1995	21 April 1997	1	
K. Karunakaran	INC	22 April 1997	21 April 2003	2	3 March 1998 LS
K. Karunakaran	INC	3 April 2004	2 April 2010	3	
Kesavan Thazhava	CPI(M)	22 April 1967	21 April 1973	1	dea 28 November 1969
B. V. Abdulla Koya	IUML	15 April 1967	14 April 1973	1	
B. V. Abdulla Koya	IUML	3 April 1974	2 April 1980	2	
B. V. Abdulla Koya	IUML	3 April 1980	2 April 1986	3	
B. V. Abdulla Koya	IUML	3 April 1986	2 April 1992	4	
B. V. Abdulla Koya	IUML	3 April 1992	2 April 1998	5	
P K Koya	INC	3 April 1962	2 April 1968	1	
Thomas Kuthiravattom	KC(M)	22 April 1985	21 April 1991	1	
N.K. Krishnan	CPI	10 November 1970	2 April 1974	1	bye 1970 C A Menon
P. Santhosh Kumar	CPI	3 April 2022	3 April 2028	1	*
M. P. Veerendra Kumar	JDU	3 April 2016	21 December 2017	1	
M. P. Veerendra Kumar	JDU	23 March 2018	2 April 2022	2	dea 28 May 2020
M. V. Shreyams Kumar	LJD	25 August 2020	2 April 2022	1	bye 2020
A V Kunhambu	CPI	29 April 1957	2 April 1958	1	bye 1957
K M Kurien	CPI(M)	3 April 1970	2 April 1976	1	
Prof P. J. Kurien	INC	10 January 2005	1 July 2006	1	Bye 2005
Prof P. J. Kurien	INC	2 July 2006	1 July 2012	2	
Prof P. J. Kurien	INC	2 July 2012	1 July 2018	3	
P. P. Suneer	CPI	2 July 2024	01 Jul 2030	1	
K K Madhavan	INC	3 April 1976	2 April 1982	1	
Mathai Manjooran	KSC	3 April 1952	2 April 1954	1	Travancore Cochin
Vakkachen Mattathil	KCJ	3 April 1998	2 April 2004	1	
Joseph Mathen	INC	3 April 1960	2 April 1966	1	
Jebi Mather	INC	3 April 2022	3 April 2028	1	*
P Balachandra Menon	CPI(M)	22 April 1967	21 April 1973	1	
V. K. Krishna Menon	INC	3 April 1956	2 April 1962	2	Res 15 March 1957 Ele 2-LS MAS 1953-56
C. Achutha Menon	CPI	3 April 1968	2 April 1974	1	Res 24 April 1970
K P S Menon	CPI(M)	3 April 1968	2 April 1974	1	
Leela Damodara Menon	INC	3 April 1974	2 April 1980	1	
Viswanatha Menon	CPI(M)	3 April 1974	2 April 1980	1	
K Mohanan	CPI(M)	2 July 1982	1 July 1988	1	
Joy Nadukkara	KC(M)	27 October 1995	21 April 1997	1	bye 1995
C K Govindan Nair	INC	3 April 1964	2 April 1970	1	dea 27 June 1964
G Gopinathan Nair	RSP	3 April 1968	2 April 1974	1	
K P Madhavan Nair	INC	3 April 1952	2 April 1956	1	Travancore Cochin
K P Madhavan Nair	INC	3 April 1956	2 April 1962	2	Travancore Cochin
M N Govindan Nair	CPI	3 April 1956	2 April 1962	1	
M N Govindan Nair	CPI	3 April 1962	2 April 1968	2	3 March 1967
P. Narayanan Nair	CPI	3 April 1956	2 April 1960	1	
C.P. Narayanan	CPI(M)	2 July 2012	1 July 2018	1	
K. Chandran Pillai	CPI(M)	22 April 2003	21 April 2009	1	
C Narayana Pillai	INC	3 April 1952	2 April 1958	1	Travancore Cochin
S. Ramachandran Pillai	CPI(M)	22 April 1991	21 April 1997	1	
S. Ramachandran Pillai	CPI(M)	22 April 1997	21 April 2003	2	
Thennala Balakrishna Pillai	INC	30 July 1991	2 April 1992	1	
Thennala Balakrishna Pillai	INC	3 April 1992	2 April 1998	2	
Thennala Balakrishna Pillai	INC	22 April 2003	21 April 2009	3	
C O Poulose	CPI(M)	7 April 1998	21 April 2003	1	bye 1998
N.K. Premachandran	RSP	2 July 2000	1 July 2006	1	
K.K. Ragesh	CPI(M)	22 April 2015	21 April 2021	1	
V. V. Raghavan	CPI	2 July 2000	1 July 2006	1	dea 27 October 2004
A. A. Rahim	CPI(M)	03 Apr 2022	03 Apr 2028	1	*
Pattiam Rajan	CPI(M)	3 April 1976	2 April 1982	1	
P. R. Rajan	CPI(M)	2 July 2006	1 July 2012	1	
P_Rajeev	CPI(M)	22 April 2009	21 April 2015	1	
A. Subba Rao	CPI	3 April 1958	2 April 1964	1	
Vayalar Ravi	INC	2 July 1994	1 July 2000	1	
Vayalar Ravi	INC	22 April 2003	21 April 2009	2	
Vayalar Ravi	INC	22 April 2009	21 April 2015	3	
Vayalar Ravi	INC	22 April 2015	21 April 2021	4	
A Abdul Razak	INC	3 April 1952	2 April 1956	1	Travancore Cochin
E S Sait	ML	3 April 1960	2 April 1966	1	
S M Sait	IND	3 April 1964	2 April 1970	1	
H A Schamnad	ML	5 February 1970	21 April 1973	1	Bye 1970 Kesavan Thazhava
H A Schamnad	INC	22 April 1973	21 April 1979	2	
Haris Beeran	IUML	2 July 2024	01 Jul 2030	1	
K C Sabastian	INC	22 April 1979	21 April 1985	1	
M. P. Abdussamad Samadani	ML	2 July 1994	1 July 2000	1	
M. P. Abdussamad Samadani	ML	2 July 2000	1 July 2006	2	
Dr. T. N Seema	CPI(M)	3 April 2010	2 April 2016	1	
N. C. Sekhar	CPI	3 April 1954	2 April 1960	1	Travancore Cochin
Dr M V A Seyid	INC	22 April 1973	21 April 1979	1	21 March 1977
V. Sivadasan	CPI(M)	24 Apr 2021	23 Apr 2027	1	*
P. A. Soloman	CPI	3 April 1958	2 April 1964	1	
K. Somaprasad	CPI(M)	3 April 2016	2 April 2022	1	
A Sreedharan	JD	2 July 1988	1 July 1994	1	
Dr P J Thomas	IND	22 April 1957	3 April 1962	1	bye 1957 V K K Menon
T K C Vaduthala	INC	3 April 1986	2 April 1992	1	dea 1 July 1988
A. Vijayaraghavan	CPI(M)	3 April 1998	2 April 2004	1	
A. Vijayaraghavan	CPI(M)	3 April 2004	2 April 2010	2	
P. V. Abdul Wahab	IUML	3 April 2004	2 April 2010	1	
P. V. Abdul Wahab	IUML	22 April 2015	21 April 2021	2	
P. V. Abdul Wahab	IUML	24 April 2021	23 April 2027	3	*

== People from Kerala who were nominated members in Rajyasabha ==
Name (Term order)	Party	Year of appointment	Year of retirement	Field
C. Sadanandan Master	BJP	2025	2031	Social Service
P. T. Usha	Nonpartisan	2022	2028	Sports
Suresh Gopi	BJP	2016	2022	Arts
M. S. Swaminathan	Nonpartisan	2007	2013	Science
Krishnaswamy Kasturirangan	Nonpartisan	2003	2009	Science
Abu Abraham	Nonpartisan	1972	1978	Arts
G. Sankara Kurup	Nonpartisan	1968	1972	Literature
K. M. Panikkar	Nonpartisan	1959	1961	Social Service

== See also ==
- List of current MPs from Kerala
