= 2027 Rajya Sabha elections =

Elections for the Upper House of Indian Parliament

- April and October 2027

4 of the 233 (Note: excluding 12 nominated seats) elected seats in the Rajya Sabha 123 (Note: out of 245 (including 12 nominated seats)) total seats needed for a majority
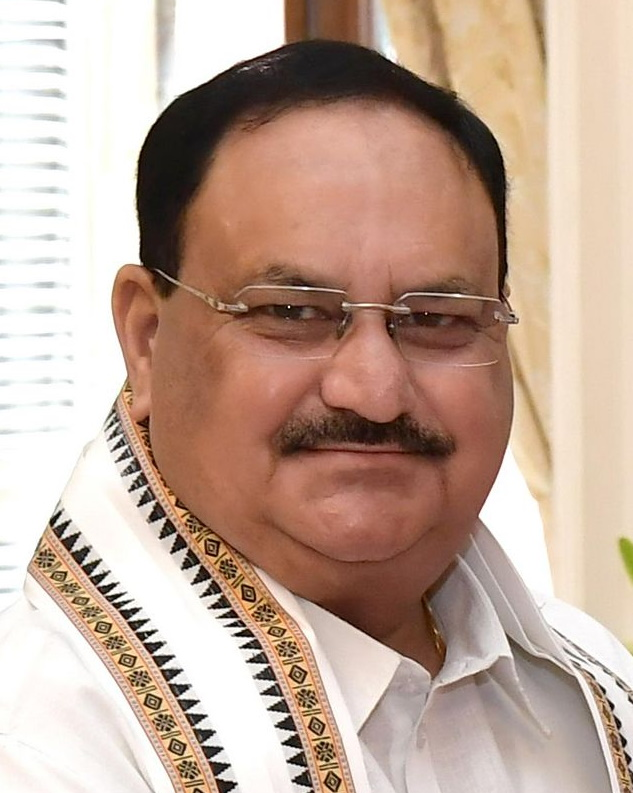

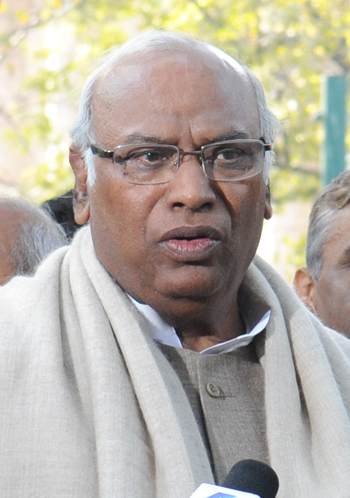
	First party	Second party
Leader	J. P. Nadda	Mallikarjun Kharge
Party	BJP	INC
Alliance	NDA	INDIA
Leader since	24 June 2024	16 February 2021
Seats before	113 (Note: excluding 5 nominated members.)	30
Current Alliance seats	142 (Note: excluding 12 nominated members.)	64
Majority before election
National Democratic Alliance
Elected Majority
National Democratic Alliance

The 2027 Rajya Sabha elections will be held as part of a routine six-year cycle of the upper house of the Parliament of India to elect 4 of its 245 members, of which the states through their legislators elect 233, and the remaining 12 are appointed by the President.

== Members retiring ==
=== Kerala ===
#	Previous MP		Term end	Elected MP	
1	P. V. Abdul Wahab	IUML	23-Apr-2027	TBD	IUML
2	John Brittas	CPI(M)	23-Apr-2027	TBD	INC
3	V. Sivadasan	CPI(M)	23-Apr-2027	TBD	CPI(M)

=== Puducherry ===
#	Previous MP		Term end	Elected MP	
1	S. Selvaganapathy	BJP	6-Oct-2027	TBD	NDA
