= 1967 Rajya Sabha elections =

Elections for the Upper House of Indian Parliament

Rajya Sabha elections were held on various dates in 1967, to elect members of the Rajya Sabha, Indian Parliament's upper chamber.

== Elections ==
Elections were held to elect members from various states.

=== Members elected ===
The following members are elected in the elections held in 1967. They are members for the term 1967-1973 and retire in year 1973, except in case of the resignation or death before the term. The list is incomplete.

State - Member - Party

Rajya Sabha members for term 1967-1973
| State | Member Name | Party | Remark |
|---|---|---|---|
| Kerala | P Balachandra Menon | CPI | |
| Kerala | Kesavan Thazhava | CPM | dea 28/11/1969 |
| Kerala | B. V. Abdulla Koya | ML | |

== Bye-elections ==
The following bye elections were held in the year 1967.

State - Member - Party

1. Andhra - Yasoda Reddy - INC ( ele 23/03/1967 term till 1972 )
2. Madras - V V Ramaswamy -OTH ( ele 20/03/1967 term till 1968 )
3. Andhra - M Chenna Reddy - INC ( ele 27/03/1967 term till 1968 )
4. Madhya Pradesh - Shiv Dutt Upadhyaya - INC ( ele 31/03/1967 term till 1970 )
5. Haryana - Mukhtiar Singh Malik - INC ( ele 06/04/1967 term till 1968 )
6. Punjab - Bhupinder Singh Brar - INC ( ele 06/04/1967 term till 1970 )
7. Bihar - Rewati Kant Sinha - INC ( ele 06/04/1967 term till 1970 )
8. Kerala - Aravindakshan Kaimal - OTH ( ele 17/04/1967 term till 1968 )
9. Kerala - K Chandrasekaran - SP ( ele 17/04/1967 term till 1970 )
10. Maharashtra - Vimal Punjab Deshmukh - INC ( ele 19/04/1967 term till 1972 )
11. Maharashtra - A. G. Kulkarni - INC ( ele 19/04/1967 term till 1970 )
12. Orissa - Bira Kesari Deo - INC ( ele 19/04/1967 term till 1970 )
13. Uttar Pradesh - Triloki Singh - INC ( ele 27/04/1967 term till 1968 )
14. Uttar Pradesh - Srikrishna Dutt Paliwal - INC ( ele 27/04/1967 term till 1968 )
15. Tripura - Dr Triguna Sen - INC ( ele 27/04/1967 term till 1968 )
16. Mysore - T Siddalingaya - INC ( ele 03/05/1967 term till 1968 )
17. Rajashtan - Ram Niwas Mirdha - INC ( ele 04/05/1967 term till 1968 )
18. Rajashtan - Harish Chandra Mathur - IND ( ele 04/05/1967 term till 1968 )
19. Jammu and Kashmir - Tirath Ram Amla - INC ( ele 04/05/1967 term till 1970 )
20. Jammu and Kashmir - A M Tariq - INC ( ele 04/05/1967 term till 1968 )
21. Assam - Sriman Prafulla Goswami - INC ( ele 04/05/1967 term till 1972 )
22. Assam - Emonsing M Sangma - INC ( ele 04/05/1967 term till 1972 )
23. Uttar Pradesh - Bindumati Devi - C-O ( ele 09/07/1967 term till 1972 )
24. Gujarat - Tribhovandas K Patel - INC ( ele 21/07/1967 term till 1968 )
25. Orissa - Brahmananda Panda - OTH ( ele 30/11/1967 term till 1972 )
