= Mathen =

- Gender: Male

Origin
- Origin: Saint Thomas Christians
- Meaning: Gift of God
- Region of origin: Kerala, India

Other names
- Related names: Mathai, Mathew, Matten

Mathen is a given name and family name of Nasrani origin. It is a variant of the Syriac name which refers to Mathew. It is common in the Indian state of Kerala among the Nasrani (also common among the Syrian Christians). Mathen originated from Matten, a Welsh name. With the same meaning, Matten was spelled by the English as Mathen to fit their grammatical structure and then was transferred to India from the United Kingdom.

Notable people with the name include:

- Carissima Mathen (born late 1960s), Canadian judge and legal scholar
- Chalakuzhy Paulose Mathen (1890–1960), an Indian banker and politician
- Denis Mathen (born 1965), governor of the province of Namur in Belgium
- George Mathen (artist), also known as Appupen, graphic novelist and artist from Bangalore, India
- Joseph Mathen (1917–1995), Indian politician and Member of Kerala State assembly
- Lucy Mathen (born 1953), British-Indian medic and journalist
- Robert-Joseph Mathen (1916–1997), the 28th Bishop of Namur in Belgium
