= H. K. Dua =

Indian journalist and diplomat (1937–2026)

Nominated member of the Rajya Sabha
- In office 18 November 2009 – 17 November 2015
- Preceded by: K. Kasturirangan

Personal details
- Born: 1 July 1937 Sargodha, Punjab Province, British India (present-day Punjab, Pakistan)
- Died: 4 March 2026 (aged 88) Delhi
- Spouse: Aditi Dua (m. 2000)
- Children: Prashant Dua
- Occupation: Journalist; diplomat; politician

Hari Krishan Dua (1 July 1937 – 4 March 2026) was an Indian journalist and diplomat who was a nominated member of the Rajya Sabha.

== Life and career ==
Dua was born on 1 July 1937. He was the editor of the Hindustan Times from 1987 to 1994, editor-in-chief of The Indian Express from 1994 to 1996, and editor of The Tribune from 2003 to 2009. During his time at the Indian Express, Dua was adjudged the 'media person for 1994' by India Media, an organization to promote mass communication. From 10 May 2001 to 26 May 2003, he served as India's Ambassador to Denmark. From February 2008 to November 2009, he was member of the National Security Council.

He has been Media Advisor to two former prime ministers – Mr Atal Behari Vajpayee and Mr H.D. Deve Gowda.

He was awarded the Padma Bhushan in 1998. He was nominated by the UPA Government to the Rajya Sabha in November 2009, with his term expiring in November 2015.

Dua died on 4 March 2026, at the age of 88, after having been admitted to hospital three weeks earlier for an unspecified illness.
