= Udayabhanu =

Udayabhanu may refer to:

- Udaya Bhanu (actress), Indian actress
- A. P. Udhayabhanu, Indian freedom fighter and author
- K. P. Udayabhanu, Indian singer and music director
- Uday Bhan, Mughal commander in the Battle of Sinhagad (1670)
