= Lakshmi N. Menon =

Indian politician

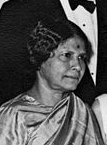
- Born: 29 March 1899
- Died: 30 November 1994 (aged 95)

Lakshmi Nandan Menon (29 March 1899 – 30 November 1994) was an Indian freedom fighter and politician. She was Minister of State from 1962 to 1966. As delegate she held a speech at the United Nations General Assembly in December 1948 at the adoption of the Universal Declaration of Human Rights.

== Early life ==
Born in Trivandrum, she was the child of Rama Varma Thampan and Madhavikutty Amma. In 1930, she married Professor V. K. Nandan Menon, who later became vice-chancellor of the University of Travancore (1950–1951) and of Patna University, as well as director for the Indian Institute of Public Administration.

== Career ==
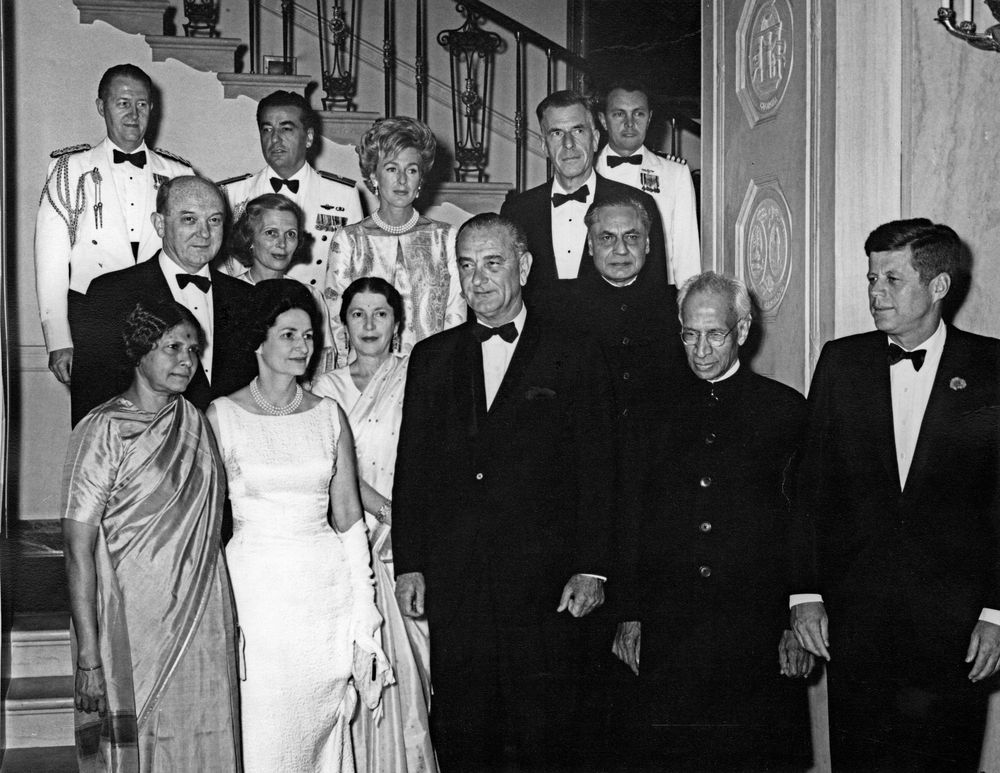
Menon (front row, far left) attending a state dinner at the White House, 3 June 1963.

She was a Rajya Sabha member from 1952 to 1966. She served in the Ministry of External Affairs as parliamentary secretary from 1952 to 1957, as deputy minister from 1957 to 1962 and as Minister of State to 1966. Retiring from political service in 1967, she turned to social work and also to writing, authoring among other things a book on Indian women for the Oxford Pamphlets on Indian Affairs series, published by Oxford University Press. She helped to found the Federation of University Women in India. In recognition of her services, she was awarded the Padma Bhushan in 1957 and she was the second Malayali to receive the award.

Menon dedicated her active life after politics for the cause of the nation. She served the All India Women's Conference as president and patron for many years. She was the vice president of All India Prohibition Council along with Morarji Desai. In 1988, she along with A. P. Udhayabhanu and Johnson J. Edayaranmula established Alcohol & Drug Information Centre (ADIC)-India and served as its president till her death. She also served as president of the All India Committee for the Eradication of Illiteracy Among Women and as chairman of the Kasturba Gandhi National Memorial Trust from 1972 to 1985.

Lakshmi Menon's tenure as Minister of State in Nehru Government was instrumental in smoothing the bureaucratic procedure involved in setting up Thumba Equatorial Rocket Launching Station at Trivandrum.

== Bibliography ==
- Ranade, Shobana; Nayar, Sushila (2003). "Lakshmi N. Menon (1899–1994)". In Mankekar, Kamla (ed.). Women Pioneers in India's Renaissance. New Delhi: National Book Trust India. ISBN 9788123737669.
