= Badri Nath Prasad =

Indian politician (1899–1966)

Member of Parliament, Rajya Sabha
- In office 3 April 1964 – 18 January 1966
- Constituency: Nominated

Personal details
- Born: 12 January 1899
- Died: 18 January 1966 (aged 67)
- Profession: Mathematician

Badri Nath Prasad (12 January 1899 – 18 January 1966) was an Indian parliamentarian. He wrote many books on mathematics and was awarded the Padma Bhushan in 1963. He was a nominated member of the Rajya Sabha from 1964 until his death in 1966.
