= C. Sadanandan Master =

Indian politician (born 1964)

- C. Sadanandan Master during Kathakali festival at Mridangasyleshwari Temple 2026

Member of Parliament, Rajya Sabha
- Incumbent
- Assumed office 21 July 2025
- Nominated by: Droupadi Murmu
- Preceded by: Ram Shakal
- Constituency: Nominated (Social work) (Keralam - Nodal State)

Personal details
- Born: May 1, 1964 (age 62) Perinchery, Mattannur, Kannur, Kerala, India
- Party: Bharatiya Janata Party
- Spouse: Vanitharani T.
- Children: Yamuna Bharati
- Occupation: Teacher, Social worker, Writer, Poet,

C. Sadanandan Master (born May 1, 1964) an Indian school teacher and social worker turned politician from Keralam who is serving as a Member of Rajya Sabha (2025) and Vice President of Bharatiya Janata Party Kerala unit. He is the vice-president of the National Teachers Union (NTU) of Kerala and the editor of its publication, Deshiya Adhyapaka Vartha.

He is currently serving as a Member of India - Japan Parliamentary Friendship Group of India Government. He is also a member of parliamentary Committee on Education, Women, Children, Youth and Sports & Committee on Health and Family Welfare. In addition he is also a board member of both Coconut Development Board and the Spices Board of India.

In 1994, at age 30, he was attacked by the members of CPI (M) party and both his legs were hacked below the knees. He unsuccessfully contested the 2016 and 2021 assembly elections from the Kuthuparamba Assembly constituency, before being nominated by the President of India to the Rajya Sabha in 2025.

== Early life and education ==
Master was born in the village Perinchery near Mattannur, in a Communist-supporting family. His father was Kunhiraman Nambiar, and his mother was Devi Amma. He completed his schooling at Sivapuram Higher Secondary School, Mattannur. Subsequently, he did his pre-degree course at Pazhassi Raja N. S. S. College, Mattanur (Kannur University), followed by graduation from St. Mary's College, Kuthuparamba. He was active as a member of the CPM during his college days, but later left it due to ideological differences. He gained a B.Com degree from Gauhati University, Assam and a B.Ed from Calicut University. In 1984, he joined the RSS through its students’ wing Akhil Bhartiya Vidyarthi Parishad (ABVP) and later worked as the RSS Boudhik Pramukh in Ernakulam.

== Career ==
He started his career as a primary school teacher at Kuzhikkal LP School in Kannur. He has held several key positions as president of the National Teachers' Union, Deputy Vice President of BJP in Kerala, Bharatiya Vichara Kendram as a member, and worked in editorial board of BJP's Kerala mouthpiece, Janmabhoomi, RSS Boudhik Pramukh for Kannur.

Addressing the Rajya Sabha, Feb 2, 2026 (He placed his artificial limbs on the table during his maiden speech)

“Those who were roaring about democracy committed an attack upon me 31 years ago in Kerala. I was returning home when organised criminals caught me from behind, put me down on the road and cut my legs, shouting Inquilab Zindabad,”

— C. Sadanandan Master,

Over the next decade, he grew in the RSS, and by 1994, at age 30, he was serving as the RSS Sahkaryavah in Kannur district. On January 25, 1994, around 8.30 pm, he got down from a bus at Uruvachal near Mattannur, that is when a gang of CPI (M) members allegedly attacked him, pinned him to the ground and hacked both his legs below the knee. They also mutilated the legs so that he couldn't be rejoined surgically. However, after a few months in the hospital, he returned to his school, using prosthetic legs to walk.

In the coming years, he continued his teaching career, remained active in Sangh Parivar politics and was a major opponent of political violence in Kerala politics. In the process, he also gained a popular epithet as 'Master' or 'Maashay. In 1999, he joined as a Social Science teacher at the Sree Durga Vilasam Higher Secondary School in Peramangalam, Thrissur.

In 2020, he retired as a teacher from a school in Peramangalam village, Thrissur, and became a part of the intellectual wing of the RSS, Bharatiya Vichara Kendram. In 2025, he appointed one of the vice-presidents of the BJP's Kerala Unit.

== Personal life ==
He is married to Vanitha Rani, also a teacher. The couple have a daughter, Yamuna Bharati, who is a B.Tech. student.
