= Rewati Kant Sinha =

Indian politician

Rewanti Kant Sinha (3 August 1928 – 19 May 1979) was a politician from Bihar, India. He represented Bihar in the Rajya Sabha from 1967 to 1970.

In 1958, he was elected general secretary of the Bihar State Non-Gazetted Employees Federation and in 1960, he became its president. In 1970, he was elected to Bihar Legislative Council.

He died on 9 July 1979. He was survived by his wife, Vidyawati Sinha. He had six sons and three daughters.
