= P. Narayanan Nair =

Indian politician (1908–1973)

P. Narayanan Nair (1908 – 10 July 1973) was an Indian politician who, from 1956 to 1962, represented Kerala in the Rajya Sabha as a member of the Communist Party of India. And editor of Mathrubhumi.

== Background ==
P. Narayanan Nair was born in 1908 at Perathu Tharavad, Killimangalam. He died on 10 July 1973.
