= Satyavrata Siddhantalankar =

Indian educationist and parliamentarian

Prof. Satyavrata Siddhantalankar (1898–1992) was an Indian educationist and parliamentarian. He was the Vice-Chancellor of the Gurukul Kangri Vishwavidyalaya and wrote a number of books on education & social science. He was nominated as a member of Rajya Sabha in 1964 and served till 1968.

== Sources ==
- Brief Biodata
