= Bharati Udayabhanu =

Bharati Udayabhanu was an Indian politician and author from the state of Kerala. She was a member of the Rajya Sabha for two consecutive terms.

Her book depicting her transition from a housewife to a Parliamentarian, Aṭukkaḷayilninnȧ pārlimenr̲ileykkȧ, was critically acclaimed.

She was married to the Indian National Congress leader and celebrated Malayalam author A. P. Udayabhanu.

== Early life ==
Bharati was born to V. Kochu Pillai Panikkar of the Varanappallil family and K. Kochu Chekothi of the Komelezhathu family in the year 1915. According to prevailing system of matrilineal inheritance, she belonged to the famous Ezhava family, Komalezhathu from Mavelikkara, Alappuzha.

After her schooling in local institutions, she joined the Madras university for graduation. She stood second in the University for the BA examination. During her university days, she met her future husband, fell in love and the couple married when both of them were hardly twenty.

== Politics ==
Bharati was elected to the Rajya Sabha, the upper house of the Indian Parliament from Kerala for the first time in 1954. During her tenure, she actively defended Kerala's interests in the States Reorganisation in 1957. She was subsequently re-elected for a second term and remained a member till 1964. She was the second woman to be elected a Member of the Parliament from the reorganized state of Kerala.

== Literature ==
Bharati authored a two-part memoir of her time in Parliament, Adukkalyil Ninnu Parliamentilekku, ( Form Kitchen to Parliament), which was critically acclaimed. The first part of the book won her the Sahitya Akademi Award in the year 1961. Her biography of Jawaharlal Nehru, Ormakalile Nehru, a collection of her memoirs on the former Indian Prime Minister too received wide acclaim.

== Personal life ==
She was married to the noted freedom fighter, politician, and social activist, A. P. Udhayabhanu. The couple had 5 children.

== Death ==
Bharati Udayabhanu died at her residence in Trivandrum in April 1983 due to a cardiac arrest.

== Published works ==
1. Adukkalayil ninnu Parlimentilekku( 2 Volumes)
2. Ormakalile Nehru
3. Roopantharangal
