= M. Ajmal Khan =

M. Ajmal Khan was an Urdu lexicographer and parliamentarian. He was nominated as a member of Rajya Sabha in 1964 and served till 1972.

== Sources ==
- Brief Biodata
