= A. P. Udhayabhanu =

Indian politician and writer

A. P. Udayabhanu
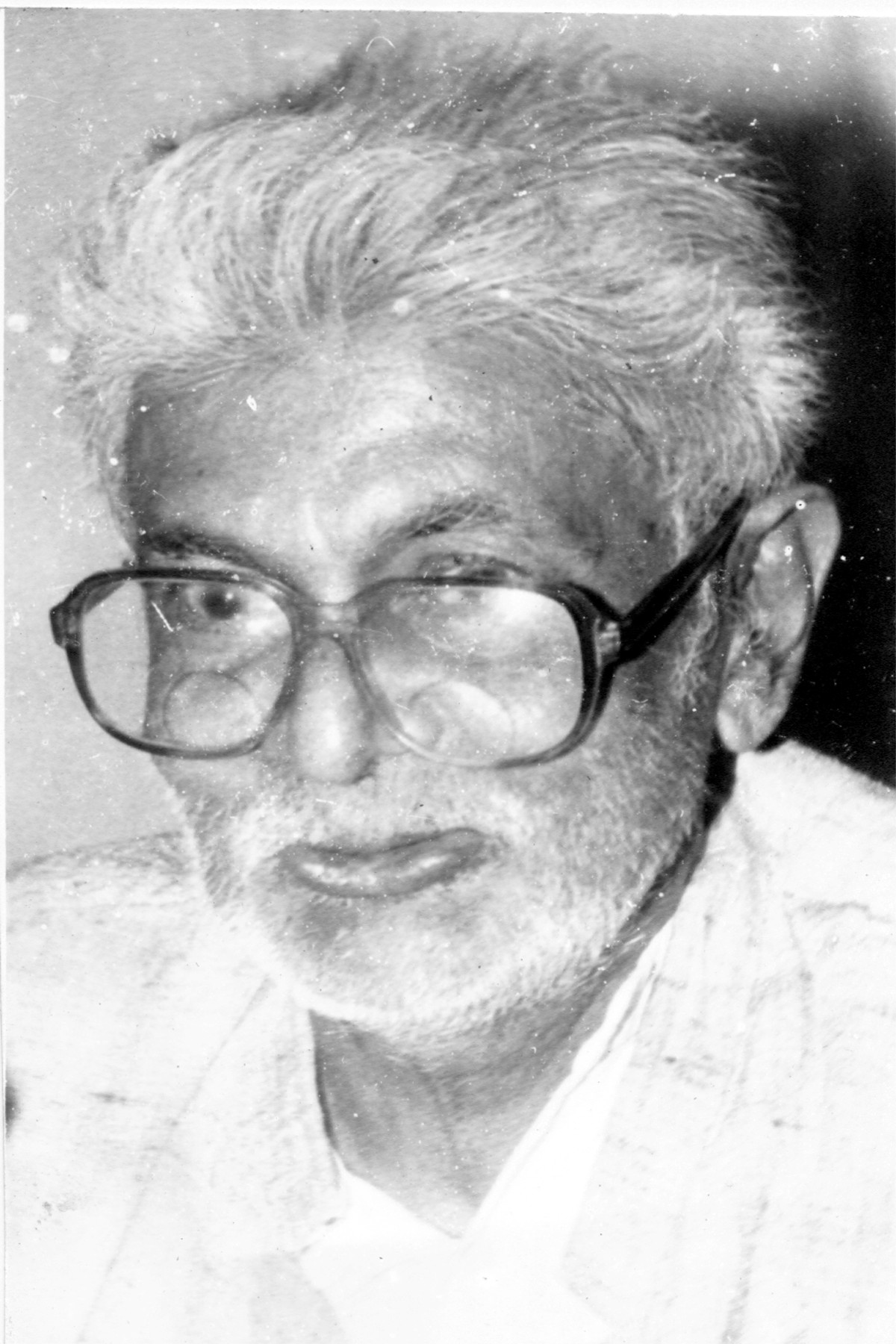
- Born: 1 October 1915; Haripad, Alleppey, Travancore (in present-day Kerala, India)
- Died: 15 December 1999 (aged 84)
- Occupations: Politician; journalist; writer
- Notable credit: Mathrubhumi
- Spouse: Bharati Udayabhanu

President of Kerala Pradesh Congress Committee
- In office 1955–1956

Member of Travancore Legislative Assembly
- In office 1944, 1948
- Writing career
- Language: Malayalam
- Notable work: Koccucakkaracci; Saṃsārikkunna daivaṃ; Ānayuṃ alpaṃ teluṅkuṃ; En̠r̠e kathayuṃ alpaṃ (autobiography)
- Notable awards: Kerala Sahithya Academy Award, lifetime contributions 1993; Swadeshabhimani Award, contributions to journalism 1993

Alumoottil Padeetathil Udayabhanu (1 October 1915 – 15 December 1999) was an Indian freedom fighter, politician, journalist, writer, and social activist from the state of Kerala.

Udayabhanu was a leader of the Indian National Congress and served as the president of the Kerala Pradesh Congress Committee (known at the time as the Thiru-Kochi Pradesh Congress). He was first elected to the Travancore Legislative Assembly in 1944. As a journalist, Udayabhanu worked as the chief editor of many newspapers, including Mathrubhumi. His articles and columns appeared in many Malayalam periodicals and newspapers on a regular basis, primarily commenting on social issues.

== Personal life ==
Udayabhanu was born on 1 October 1915 to Kunhiraman Channar of the Komath family and Narayani Channatti of the Alummoottil family, in Muttom near Haripad of Central Travancore. Udayabhanu got his family name, Alumoottil Padeetathil, through matrilineal succession.

The Alummoottil family, had their family title as Channar. He pursued a Bachelor of Arts degree in 1936, as well as a Bachelor of Law degree. He practiced law in the courts of Mavelikkara and Thiruvananthapuram, beginning 1940.

Udayabhanu was married to Bharati Udayabhanu, who was a member of the Indian Parliament (1954 – 1958, 1958 – 1964) and one of Kerala's first female MPs in the Rajya Sabha. She was also a writer, and her autobiographical work Aṭukkaḷayilninnu Pārlimentilēkku (From Kitchen to Parliament) won her the Kerala Sahitya Academy Award in 1960. She died in 1983. The couple had 5 children.

== Political career ==
Udayabhanu was influenced by the political involvement of his uncle, the social reformer T.K. Madhavan, who was one of the organisers of the Vaikom Satyagraha. He participated in the freedom struggle actively.

In 1932, he became a member of the Indian National Congress. A prolific speaker, he rose to the leadership of the party very quickly: Udayabhanu was first elected to the Travancore Legislative Assembly on the Congress ticket in 1944, at the age of 29; then again in 1948, this time as general secretary. He was the president of the Pradesh Congress committee (at the time, the Thiru-Kochi Pradesh Congress Committee) from 1955 to 1956.

Udayabhanu was a member of the Kerala Public Service Commission from 1963 to 1969. He also served as chairman of the Kerala Government Prohibition Commission responsible for the Udayabhanu Commission Report on Alcohol Policy, in response to growing anti-liquor protests following incidents of methanol poisoning in the state. The report put forth recommendations — which subsequent governments took up to varying extents — that any prohibition should be introduced gradually, and that consumption of drinks with lower alcohol content should be encouraged over stronger beverages. Udayabhanu additionally chaired the A. P. Udayabhanu Commission for the Kerala Jail Reforms Committee, tasked with studying prison administration and living conditions in the state and suggesting reforms. The committee released a report spanning 1991–1993.

Along with Lakshmi N. Menon, Udayabhanu was one of the founders of the non-governmental organization Alcohol & Drug Information Centre (ADIC-India), and he acted as its president after Menon's death, until 15 December 1999. Udayabhanu also served as chairperson of the Kerala chapter of the World Wide Fund for Nature.

== Journalistic career ==
Udayabhanu held editorial positions at a number of newspapers. He established the newspaper Prabodham in 1948, from Alappuzha, and later acted as chief editor at Deenabandhu.

Between 1961 and 1978, Udayabhanu served on the editorial board of Mathrubhumi, one of Kerala's major morning dailies, and was noted for his distinct writing style. He was associate editor of the newspaper from 1962 to 1963, and became resident editor of the Kozhikode edition in 1969.

Aside from his work at Mathrubhumi, he contributed guest columns at various newspapers, such as Manorajyam, Kunkumam, and Keralabhushanam.

He received the Swadeshabhimani Award for contributions to journalism in 1993.

== Literary career ==
Udayabhanu is also known for his contributions to Malayalam literature, especially towards the genre of light essays, often with a humorous bent. Along with autobiographical anecdotes, some of his writing included social critiques arising from issues of caste and religion, as well as satirical examinations of corruption and government. Works such as Saṃsārikkunna daivaṃ, Ānayuṃ alpaṃ teluṅkuṃ, Koccucakkaracci, and Arthavuṃ anarthavuṃ helped him gain prominence as a writer of eminence in Malayalam. In 1993, he was honored with the Kerala Sahithya Academy Award for lifetime contributions.

En̠r̠e kathayuṃ alpaṃ is his autobiography.

== Awards ==
- Kerala Sahithya Academy Award for lifetime contributions in 1993
- Swadeshabhimani Award for contributions to journalism in 1993
- Editor K. Sukumaran Memorial Award in 1995
- C. Achyutha Menon Award for contribution to public work

== Bibliography ==
List is not comprehensive. All works are in Malayalam.

- Kṣētr̲amillātta kṣētr̲aṃ (The temple without a temple). Kottayam: D.C. Books. 1993.
- Koccucakkaracci : lēkhanaṅṅaḷ (Koccucakkaracci: essays). Kottayam: Sahithya Pravarthaka Co-operative Society Ltd., National Bookstall. 1968.
- Pāpattint̲e nagaraṃ (City of sins). Kottayam: D.C. Books. 1987.
- Smaraṇakaḷ sambhavaṅṅaḷ (Memories and Incidents). Kottayam: D.C. Books. 1993.
- Ōrmmayuṭe kaṇṇāṭi (The Mirror of Memory). Kottayam: D.C. Books. 1997.
- Udayabhānuvin̠r̠e tirañjeṭutta upanyāsaṅṅaḷ (Selected Essays of Udayabhanu). Kottayam: D.C. Books. 1984.
- Prakr̥tipūja : lēkhanaṅṅaḷ (Pūja for nature: essays). Trivandrum: World Wild Life Fund. 1986.
- Onnākum koccutumpi (Together, little dragonfly). Kottayam: Sahithya Pravarthaka Co-operative Society Ltd. 1969.
- Oru pūkkināvu': narmmalēkhanaṅṅaḷ (A flowery dream: humorous essays). Kottayam: Sahitya Pravarthaka Co-operation Society Ltd. 1979.
- En̠r̠e kathayillāymakaḷ (The spaces in my story). Kottayam: D.C. Books. 1991.
- En̠r̠e kathayuṃ alpaṃ: ātmakatha (My story until now: autobiography). Kottayam: D.C. Books. 1998.
- Arthavuṃ anarthavuṃ, hāsyalēkhanaṅṅaḷ (Meaning and meaninglessness: humorous essays). Kottayam: Sahithya Pravarthaka Co-operative Society Ltd. 1967.
- En̠r̠e manōrājyaṅṅaḷ: lēkhanaṅṅaḷ (My kingdom of memories: essays). Kottayam: Urmila Vijayan, National Bookstall. 1981.
- Maraṇattin̠r̠e mukhaṃ (The face of death). Kottayam: D.C. Books. 1987.
- Tala tiriñña cintakaḷ: rāṣṭr̲īya nirīkṣaṇaṅṅaḷ (Head-spinning thoughts: observations on politics). Kottayam: D.C. Books. 1985.
- Ānayuṃ alpaṃ Teluṅkuṃ: lēkhanaṅṅaḷ (An elephant and a Telugu: essays). Kottayam: Sahithya Pravarthaka Co-operative Society Ltd., National Bookstall. 1968.
- Saṃsārikkunna daivaṃ, hāsyalēkhanaṅṅaḷ (The talking god: humorous essays). Kottayam: Sahithya Pravarthaka Co-operative Society Ltd. 1967.
- Ōrō taḷiriluṃ (With each sprig). Kozhikode: Touring Bookstall. 1971.
- Pr̲ēmakkiḷi : lēkhanaṅṅaḷ (Lovebird: essays). Kottayam: Sahithya Pravarthaka Co-operative Society Ltd., National Bookstall. 1973.
- Pēppaṭṭiseminār. Kottayam: D.C. Books. 1983.
- Vr̥ddhavicāraṃ (History). Thiruvananthapuram: Prabhatham Printing & Publishing Co. 2000.
- Kaḷiyuṃ kāryavuṃ (Play and serious matters). Kozhikode: Mathrubhumi Printing and Publishing. 1975.
