= Alummoottil =

Aristocratic family from Kerala, India

- Country: India
- Place of origin: Alappuzha, Kerala
- Founded: 1600s
- Final head: Kochu Krishnan Channar
- Estates: Alummoottil Meda in Muttom, Kerala
- Dissolution: Early 1900s

Alummoottil is an Indian aristocratic Ezhava family (Tharavad) in Karthikapally Thaluk of Alappuzha district in Kerala. The family was at its financial peak during the seventeenth to twentieth centuries.

AP Udayabhanu's novel "Ente Kadha Illaymakal" suggests that by the early 1800s, the family was wealthier than the King of Travancore.

== History ==
The family's lineage is traced back to the early 1600s. During the 1700s, Alummoottil family was the supplier of cavalry regiments - mounted soldiers, lances, and war horses - to the Odanad Maharaja. Alummootil members were also known for their expertise in Kalaripayattu martial art of Kerala. At its peak, the family used to administer 64 Kalaris (Kalaripayattu training centers), annually supplying 1000 infantrymen and 250 mounted-soldiers to the kingdom. Alummoottil Karanavars (chieftains) served as the Gurukkals (instructors) of these training centres.

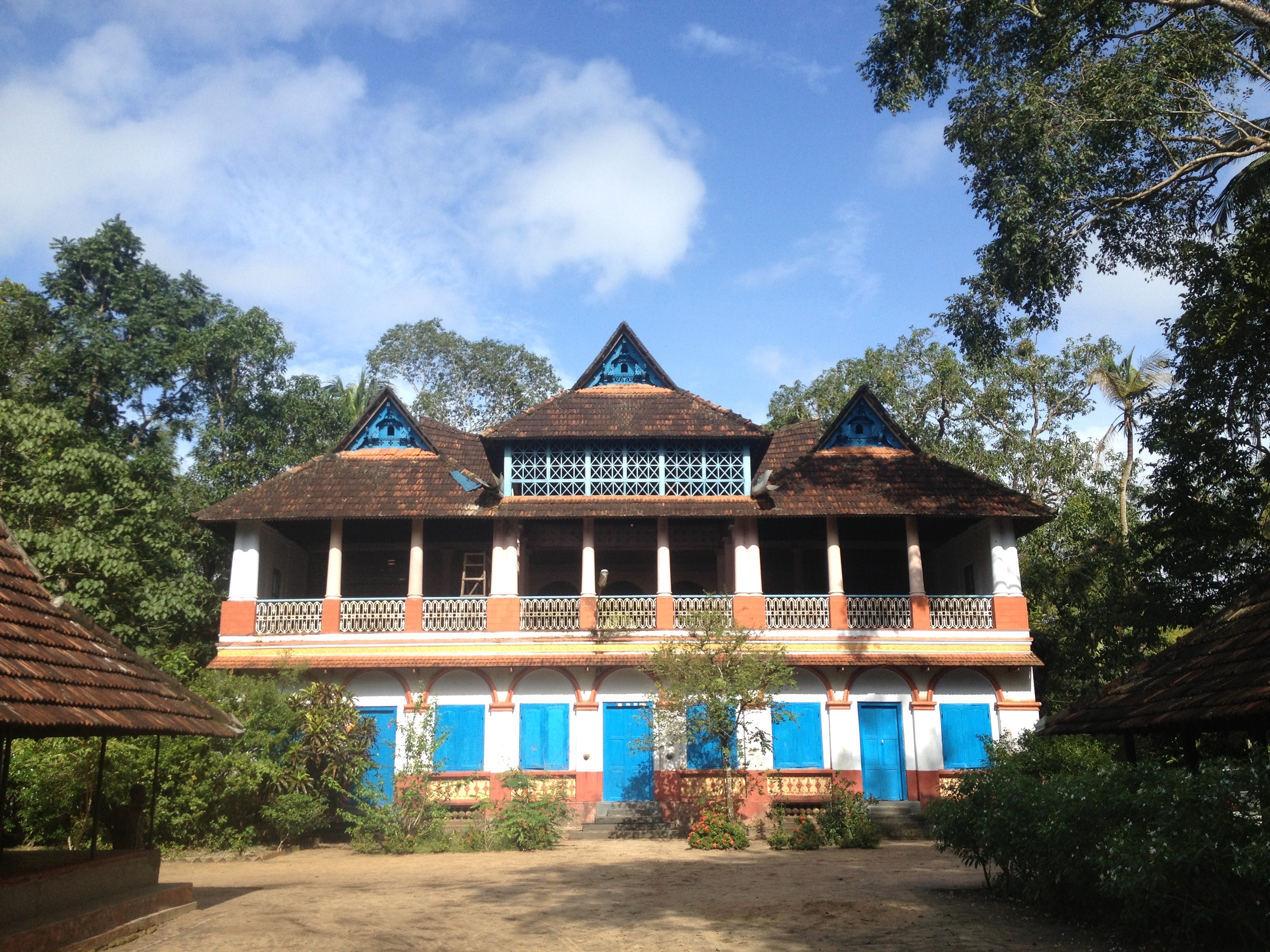
The Alummoottil mansion in Alappuzha.

Alummoottil soldiers commanded infantry regiments and intelligence platoons within the Maharaja's army. This role briefly ended when King Marthanda Varma annexed the Kayamkulam kingdom to Travancore in 1746. A few years after the annexation, Varma summoned the Alummoottil Karanavar and asked for the family's support. After negotiations, Alummoottil agreed to help the kingdom of Travancore if the former Kayamkulam Maharaja's life was spared and the dissolved military ranks of the Alummoottil family members were restored, conditions which Varma agreed to.

Following the fall of the Odanad kingdom, Alummoottil Karanavars started focusing on trade. By the 1750s, most of the spice trade between Europe and Southern Kerala flowed through the warehouses of Alummoottil. The family were one of the highest tax-payers within the Travancore kingdom. AP Udayabhanu's novel "Ente Kadha Illaymakal" suggests that by the early 1800s, the family was wealthier than the King of Travancore.

In the beginning of the 20th century, internal rifts and fissures started developing in the family, eventually leading to the assassination of Kochu Kunju Channar in March 1921, the second-last Karanavar of the Alummoottil family. The main accused, AP Shreedharan Channar (nephew of Kochu Kunju Channar), was executed in 1921 by the royal decree.

The last Karanavar of Alummoottil, Kochu Krishnan Channar, split the family properties among the descendants, in the 1940s, dissolving one of the wealthiest families in contemporary Kerala history.

The Alummoottil Meda (mansion), the historical home of the family is located in Muttom, Kerala. The property's courtyard (nalukettu) is over 425 years old and is one of the oldest such structures in Kerala. The mansion itself is 125 years old.

== In the movies ==
The 1993 Indian Malayalam-language film Manichitrathazhu is loosely based on the murder of Kochu Kunju Channar. The movie was remade in other languages, including the 2004 Kannada remake Apthamitra, 2005 Tamil remake Chandramukhi and the 2007 Hindi comedy-horror Bhool Bhulaiyaa. The Alummoottil Meda was featured in the film Rakhtasakshikal Sindabad.

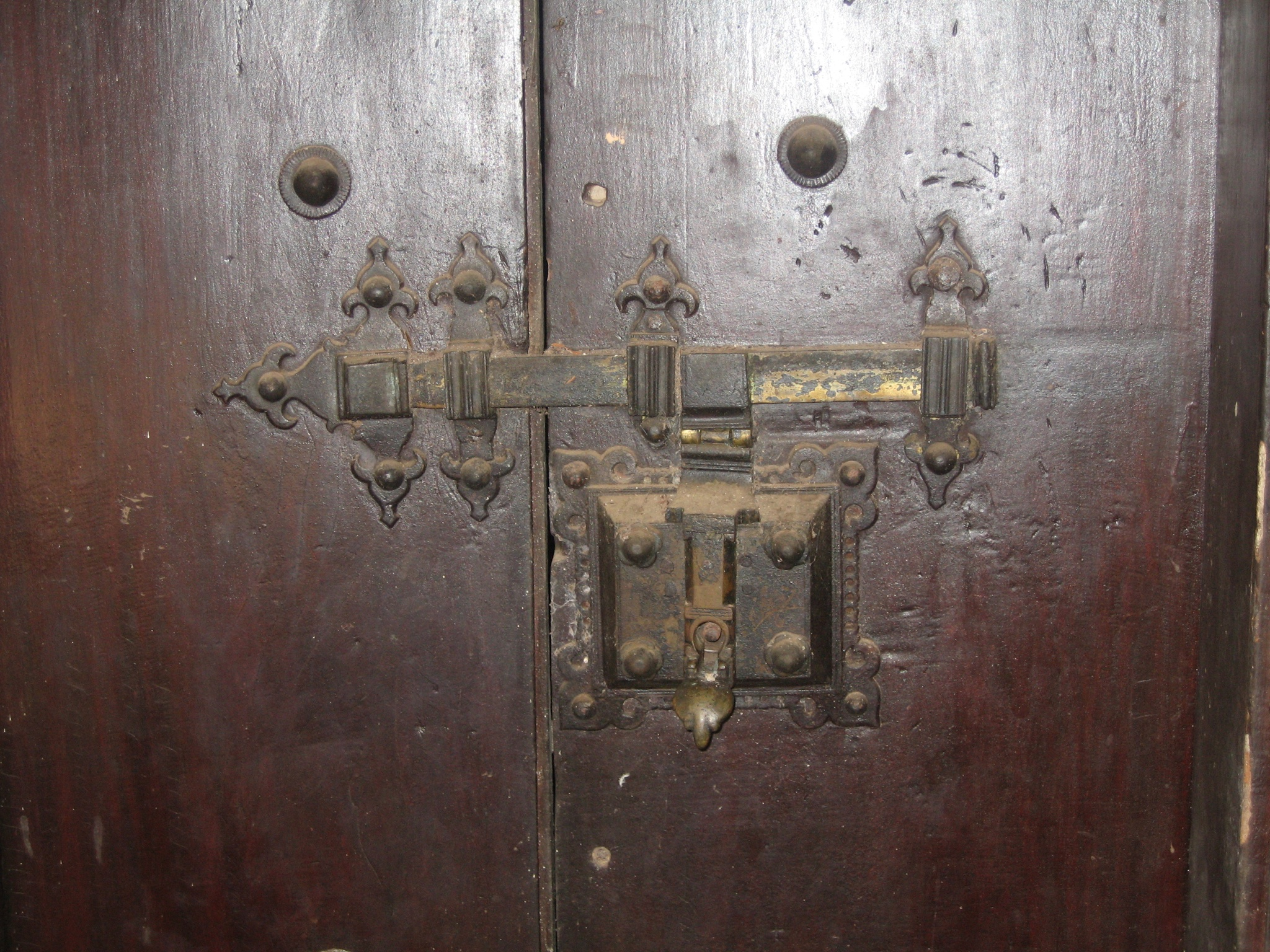
This is the ornamental lock that inspired the movie name Manichitrathazhu.

== Notable people ==
- T. K. Madhavan
- A.P. Udayabhanu
- Dr C. O. Karunakaran
- Arattupuzha Velayudha Panicker
- Madhu Muttom

== See also ==
- Ezhava
- Manichithrathazhu
