= Kamla Mankekar =

Indian journalist, author, and activist (1928–2018)

- Born: 1928; Lahore
- Died: 2018 (aged 89–90)
- Occupation: Journalist
- Partner: D.R. Mankekar
- Writing career
- Language: English
- Notable works: Decline and Fall of Indira Gandhi, Breaking News

Kamla Mankekar (1928–2018) was an Indian journalist, author, and social activist. She is best known as one of the early female journalists in the independent India.

== Life and career ==
Kamla Mankekar was born in Lahore, British India (currently in Pakistan), the daughter of Lilavati and Harbans Lal. Her family fled West Punjab for India as refugees during Partition.

In Delhi, she studied at the refugee camp college, and took evening postgraduate classes in journalism.

Mankekar started her career as writer, columnist, and sub-editor for the Indian News Chronicle, In 1950, she started working for The Times of India, where she was a writer, sub-editor, and film critic. She later worked at The Indian Express for five years. She eventually went on to work as a freelance journalist.

In 1958, she married D.R. Mankekar, author and former editor of both The Indian Express and The Times of India. They would go on to co-author the book Decline and Fall of Indira Gandhi.

An active member of civil society, she helped found the Consumer Guidance Society in Bombay, and was a long-time member of the All India Women's Conference. She was also the first chairperson of the Delhi State Commission for Women, a member of India's National Integration Council, and on India's film censor board.

In the 1960s, she headed the public relations department of Rallis India Ltd.

She wrote about her experiences as a pioneering Indian female journalist in her 2014 memoir, Breaking News: A Woman in a Man's World.

After the death of her husband, she moved to California to be near her children.

== Works ==
- Abortion: A Social Dilemma (1973)
- Voluntary Effort in Family Planning: A Brief History (1974)
- Women in India (1975)
- Decline and Fall of Indira Gandhi (1977, with D.R. Mankekar)
- Nagendra Singh, A Many Splendoured Life (1998)
- Women Pioneers in India's Renaissance (2002, with Sushila Nayar)
- Culture and Religious Traditions in Temples of Goa (2004)
- Breaking News: A Woman in a Man's World (2014)
