= Carissima Mathen =

Canadian judge

Judge of the Ontario Superior Court of Justice
- Incumbent
- Assumed office 2024-05-01
- Appointed by: Arif Virani
- Preceded by: T. J. McEwen

Carissima Mathen is a Canadian judge. She was appointed a judge of the Ontario Superior Court of Justice on May 1, 2024. Before her appointment as a judge, Mathen was a law professor at the University of Ottawa Faculty of Law and the University of New Brunswick Faculty of Law, and a lawyer with Women's Legal Education and Action Fund.

== Books ==
- Mathen, Carissima; Plaxton, Michael (2020). The tenth justice: judicial appointments, Marc Nadon, and the Supreme Court Act Reference. Landmark Cases in Canadian Law. Vancouver: UBC Press. ISBN 978-0-7748-6429-9.
- Mathen, Carissima; Macklem, Patrick, eds. (2022). Canadian constitutional law (Sixth ed.). Toronto, Ontario: Emond Montgomery Publications Limited. ISBN 978-1-77462-137-0. OCLC 1287092261.
- Mathen, Carissima (2019). Courts without cases: the law and politics of advisory opinions. Oxford London New York New Delhi Sydney: Hart. ISBN 978-1-5099-2250-5. OCLC 1076375275.
