= Aravindakshan Kaimal =

Indian politician

Aravindakshan Kaimal was a politician from the Indian state of Kerala who represented Kerala in the Rajya Sabha from 1967 to 1968. He was from Kechery in the Thrissur district.
