= B. V. Abdulla Koya =

Indian politician

B. V. Abdulla Koya (1914–1998) was an Indian politician from Kerala. He was elected to Indian Parliament (Rajya Sabha) from Kerala several times (1967–73, 1974–80, 1980–86, 1986–92 and 1992–98) with the IUML. He is one of the longest served Rajyasabha member served more than 30 years .. he will attended more than 100 parliament sessions.

== Election History ==
=== Rajya Sabha ===
Position	Party	Constituency	From	To	Tenure
Member of Parliament, Rajya Sabha (1st Term)	IUML	Kerala	15 April 1967	14 April 1973	5 years, 364 days
Member of Parliament, Rajya Sabha (2nd Term)	IUML	Kerala	3 April 1974	2 April 1980	5 years, 365 days
Member of Parliament, Rajya Sabha (3rd Term)	IUML	Kerala	3 April 1980	2 April 1986	5 years, 364 days
Member of Parliament, Rajya Sabha (4th Term)	IUML	Kerala	3 April 1986	2 April 1992	5 years, 365 days
Member of Parliament, Rajya Sabha (5th Term)	IUML	Kerala	3 April 1992	2 April 1998	5 years, 364 days
