= List of nominated members of the Rajya Sabha =

Twelve members are nominated to the Rajya Sabha by the President of India for a six-year term for their contributions towards arts, literature, sciences, and social services. This right has been bestowed upon the President according to the Fourth Schedule (Articles 4(1) and 80(2)) of the Constitution of India.

== Current members ==
This is a Current list of Members of the Rajya Sabha who have been nominated by the President.

#	Name	Field	Party	Term start	Term end
1	Meenakshi Jain	Literature and Education	NOM	13 July 2025	12 July 2031
2	Sudha Murty	Social work and Education	NOM	8 March 2024	7 March 2030
3	Veerendra Heggade	Social work	NOM	7 July 2022	6 July 2028
4	Ilaiyaraaja	Art	NOM	7 July 2022	6 July 2028
5	V. Vijayendra Prasad	Art	NOM	7 July 2022	6 July 2028
6	P. T. Usha	Sports	NOM	7 July 2022	6 July 2028
7	Harivansh Narayan Singh	Journalism	NOM	10 April 2026	9 April 2032
8	Ujjwal Nikam	Law	BJP	13 July 2025	12 July 2031
9	C. Sadanandan Master	Social work	BJP	13 July 2025	12 July 2031
10	Harsh Vardhan Shringla	Diplomacy	BJP	13 July 2025	12 July 2031
11	Satnam Singh Sandhu	Education	BJP	30 January 2024	29 January 2030
12	Ghulam Ali Khatana	Social work	BJP	14 September 2022	13 September 2028

== List of members ==
This is a complete list of Members of the Rajya Sabha who have been nominated by the President.

Sr. No.	Portrait	Name	Field	Start of Term	End of Term
1		Alladi Krishnaswamy Iyer	Law	3 April 1952	3 October 1953
2		Satyendranath Bose	Science	3 April 1952	2 July 1959
3		Prithviraj Kapoor	Arts	3 April 1952	2 April 1960
4	–	Jagadisan Mohandas Kumarappa	Education	3 April 1952	2 April 1954
5		Kalidas Nag	Education	3 April 1952	2 April 1954
6		Rukmini Devi Arundale	Arts	3 April 1952	2 April 1962
7	–	N. R. Malkani	Education	3 April 1952	2 April 1962
8		Sahib Singh Sokhey	Science	3 April 1952	2 April 1956
9		Zakir Husain	Education	3 April 1952	6 July 1957
10		Maithili Sharan Gupt	Literature	3 April 1952	2 April 1964
11		Kaka Kalelkar	Education	3 April 1952	2 April 1964
12		Radha Kumud Mukherjee	Literature	3 April 1952	2 April 1958
13		Pandurang Vaman Kane	Law	16 November 1953	11 September 1959
14		Moturi Satyanarayana	Social Work	3 April 1954	2 April 1966
15	–	Ardeshir Ruttonji Wadia	Education	3 April 1954	2 April 1966
16		Bhargavram Vitthal Warerkar	Literature	3 April 1956	23 September 1964
17	–	Tara Chand	Literature	22 August 1957	2 April 1968
18		Ajudhia Nath Khosla	Science	3 April 1958	4 October 1959
19	–	K. M. Panikkar	Literature	25 August 1959	22 May 1961
20		Jairamdas Daulatram	Law	19 October 1959	2 April 1976
21	–	Mohanlal Saksena	Law	22 November 1959	2 April 1964
22		Tarasankar Bandyopadhyay	Literature	3 April 1960	2 April 1966
23	–	V. T. Krishnamachari	Public Affairs	9 June 1961	13 February 1964
24		R. R. Diwakar	Literature & Social Work	3 April 1962	2 April 1968
25		Gopal Singh	Literature	3 April 1962	2 April 1968
26	–	M. Ajmal Khan	Literature	31 March 1964	18 October 1969
27		Shakuntala Paranjpye	Social Work	3 April 1964	2 April 1970
28	–	Badri Nath Prasad	Education	3 April 1964	18 January 1966
29	–	G. Ramachandran	Social Work	3 April 1964	2 April 1970
30	–	Satyavrata Siddhantalankar	Education	25 November 1964	2 April 1968
31	–	M. N. Kaul	Public Affairs	30 March 1966	2 April 1972
32		Harivansh Rai Bachchan	Literature	3 April 1966	2 April 1972
33		Dhananjay Ramchandra Gadgil	Economics	3 April 1966	31 August 1967
34		M. C. Setalvad	Law	3 April 1966	2 April 1972
35		G. Sankara Kurup	Literature	3 April 1968	2 April 1972
36		Joachim Alva	Law & Public Affairs	3 April 1968	2 April 1974
37		S. Nurul Hasan	Education	3 April 1968	30 September 1971
38	–	K. Ramiah	Science	3 April 1968	2 April 1974
39	–	Ganga Sharan Sinha	Social Work	3 April 1968	2 April 1974
40		Maragatham Chandrasekar	Social Work	3 April 1970	2 April 1982
40		Maragatham Chandrasekar	Social Work	27 September 1982	29 December 1984
41		Umashankar Joshi	Literature	3 April 1970	2 April 1976
42		Rasheeduddin Khan	Education	3 April 1970	2 April 1982
43	–	Vidya Prakash Dutt	Education	4 December 1971	2 April 1980
44	–	Abu Abraham	Arts	3 April 1972	2 April 1978
45	–	Pramathanath Bishi	Education	3 April 1972	2 April 1978
46		C. K. Daphtary	Law	3 April 1972	2 April 1978
47		Habib Tanvir	Arts	3 April 1972	2 April 1978
48	–	Krishna Kripalani	Literature	3 April 1974	2 April 1980
49		Lokesh Chandra	Literature	3 April 1974	2 April 1986
50	–	Scato Swu	Social Work	3 April 1974	2 April 1986
51	–	B. N. Banerjee	Public Affairs	3 April 1976	2 April 1982
52		Malcolm Adiseshiah	Economics	14 April 1978	13 April 1984
53	–	Fathema Ismail	Social Work	14 April 1978	13 April 1984
54	–	Pandurang Dharmaji Jadhav	Social Work	14 April 1978	13 April 1984
55		Bhagwati Charan Varma	Literature	14 April 1978	5 October 1981
56		Nargis	Arts	3 April 1980	3 May 1981
57		Khushwant Singh	Journalism	3 April 1980	2 April 1986
58	–	Asima Chatterjee	Science	18 February 1982	13 April 1984
58	–	Asima Chatterjee	Science	9 May 1984	8 May 1990
59		Sivaji Ganesan	Arts	18 February 1982	2 April 1986
60	–	Hayatullah Ansari	Literature	27 September 1982	26 September 1988
61	–	Madan Bhatia	Law	27 September 1982	26 September 1988
61	–	Madan Bhatia	Law	25 November 1988	24 November 1994
62	–	V. N. Tiwari	Education	27 September 1982	3 April 1984
63	–	Ghulam Rasool Kar	Social Work	9 May 1984	28 December 1987
64	–	Tindivanam K. Ramamurthy	Law & Social Work	9 May 1984	8 May 1990
65	–	H. L. Kapur	Others — Army	3 January 1985	14 November 1985
66		Purushottam Kakodkar	Social Work	3 January 1985	2 January 1991
67		Salim Ali	Science	4 September 1985	20 June 1987
68		Ela Bhatt	Social Work	12 May 1986	26 September 1988
69		Amrita Pritam	Literature	12 May 1986	11 May 1992
70		M. F. Husain	Arts	12 May 1986	11 May 1992
71		R. K. Narayan	Literature	12 May 1986	11 May 1992
72		Ravi Shankar	Arts	12 May 1986	11 May 1992
73		Anwara Taimur	Public Affairs	25 November 1988	8 May 1990
74	–	Sat Paul Mittal	Social Work	25 November 1988	12 January 1992
75		Bishambhar Nath Pande		25 November 1988	24 November 1994
76		Mohammad Yunus	Public Affairs	15 June 1989	14 June 1995
77		Jagmohan	Public Affairs	28 May 1990	9 May 1996
78		Prakash Ambedkar	Law & Social Work	18 September 1990	17 September 1996
79	–	Bhupinder Singh Mann	Others — Agriculture	18 September 1990	17 September 1996
80	–	Russi Karanjia	Journalism	11 January 1991	10 January 1997
81		Mahendra Prasad	Public Affairs	27 August 1993	24 November 1994
82	–	M. Aram	Education	27 August 1993	24 May 1997
83		Vyjayantimala	Arts	27 August 1993	26 August 1999
84	–	B. B. Dutta	Education	27 August 1993	26 August 1999
85	–	Habibur Rahman Nomani	Social Work	27 August 1993	26 August 1999
86		Nirmala Deshpande	Social Work	27 August 1997	26 August 1999
86		Nirmala Deshpande	Social Work	24 June 2004	1 May 2008
87		Shabana Azmi	Arts	27 August 1997	26 August 2003
88	–	P. Selvie Das	Education	27 August 1997	26 August 2003
89	–	Kartar Singh Duggal	Literature	27 August 1997	26 August 2003
90		Kuldip Nayyar	Journalism	27 August 1997	26 August 2003
91	–	Raja Ramanna	Science	27 August 1997	26 August 2003
92		C. Narayana Reddy	Literature	27 August 1997	26 August 2003
93		Mrinal Sen	Arts	27 August 1997	26 August 2003
94		Harmohan Singh Yadav	Social Work	27 August 1997	26 August 2003
95		Nanaji Deshmukh	Social Work	22 November 1999	21 November 2005
96		Lata Mangeshkar	Arts	22 November 1999	21 November 2005
97		Fali Sam Nariman	Law	22 November 1999	21 November 2005
98	–	Cho Ramaswamy	Journalism	22 November 1999	21 November 2005
99		Hema Malini	Arts	27 August 2003	26 August 2009
100		Bimal Jalan	Economics	27 August 2003	26 August 2009
101		K. Kasturirangan	Science	27 August 2003	8 July 2009
102	–	Narayan Singh Manaklao	Social Work	27 August 2003	26 August 2009
103		Vidya Niwas Misra	Education	27 August 2003	14 February 2005
104	–	Chandan Mitra	Journalism	27 August 2003	26 August 2009
105		Dara Singh	Arts	27 August 2003	26 August 2009
106		Kapila Vatsyayan	Education	16 February 2006	24 March 2006
106		Kapila Vatsyayan	Education	10 April 2007	15 February 2012
107		Shobhana Bhartia	Literature	16 February 2006	15 February 2012
108		Shyam Benegal	Arts	16 February 2006	15 February 2012
109		Ram Jethmalani	Law	10 April 2006	26 August 2009
110		M. S. Swaminathan	Science	10 April 2007	9 April 2013
111		C. Rangarajan	Economics	9 August 2008	10 August 2009
112	–	H. K. Dua	Journalism	18 November 2009	17 November 2015
113		Ashok Sekhar Ganguly	Others	18 November 2009	17 November 2015
114		Mani Shankar Aiyar	Public Affairs	22 March 2010	21 March 2016
115		Javed Akhtar	Literature	22 March 2010	21 March 2016
116		B. Jayashree	Arts	22 March 2010	21 March 2016
117		Ram Dayal Munda	Others — Agriculture	22 March 2010	30 September 2011
118		Bhalchandra Mungekar	Economics	22 March 2010	21 March 2016
119		Anu Aga	Social Work	27 April 2012	26 April 2018
120		Rekha	Arts	27 April 2012	26 April 2018
121		Sachin Tendulkar	Sports	27 April 2012	26 April 2018
122	–	Mrinal Miri	Education	29 June 2012	21 March 2016
123	–	K. Parasaran	Law	29 June 2012	28 June 2018
124	–	K. T. S. Tulsi	Law	25 February 2014	24 February 2020
125		Navjot Singh Sidhu	Public Affairs	25 April 2016	18 July 2016
126		Pranav Pandya		4 May 2016	11 May 2016
127		Narendra Jadhav	Economics	25 April 2016	24 April 2022
128		Swapan Dasgupta	Literature	25 April 2016	16 March 2021
128		Swapan Dasgupta	Literature	02 June 2021	24 April 2022
129		Mary Kom	Sports	25 April 2016	24 April 2022
130		Suresh Gopi	Arts	25 April 2016	24 April 2022
131		Subramanian Swamy	Public Affairs	25 April 2016	24 April 2022
132		Sambhaji Raje		13 June 2016	03 May 2022
133		Roopa Ganguly	Arts	04 October 2016	24 April 2022
134		Raghunath Mohapatra	Arts	14 July 2018	9 May 2021
135		Sonal Mansingh	Arts	14 July 2018	23 July 2024
136		Ram Shakal	Public Affairs	14 July 2018	23 July 2024
137		Rakesh Sinha	Literature	14 July 2018	23 July 2024
138		Ranjan Gogoi	Law	19 March 2020	18 March 2026
139		Mahesh Jethmalani	Law	02 June 2021	13 July 2024
140		P. T. Usha	Sports	7 July 2022	6 July 2028
141		Veerendra Heggade	Social Work	7 July 2022	6 July 2028
142		Ilaiyaraaja	Arts	7 July 2022	6 July 2028
143		K. V. Vijayendra Prasad	Arts	7 July 2022	6 July 2028
144		Ghulam Ali Khatana	Social Work	10 September 2022	9 September 2028
145		Satnam Singh Sandhu	Education	31 January 2024	30 January 2030
146		Sudha Murty	Social Work & Education	8 March 2024	7 March 2030
147		Ujjwal Nikam	Law	13 July 2025	12 July 2031
148		C. Sadanandan Master	Social Work	13 July 2025	12 July 2031
149		Harsh Vardhan Shringla	Diplomacy	13 July 2025	12 July 2031
150		Meenakshi Jain	Literature	13 July 2025	12 July 2031
151		Harivansh Narayan Singh	Journalism	10 April 2026	9 April 2032
