= P. Santhosh Kumar =

Indian politician

P. Sandosh Kumar
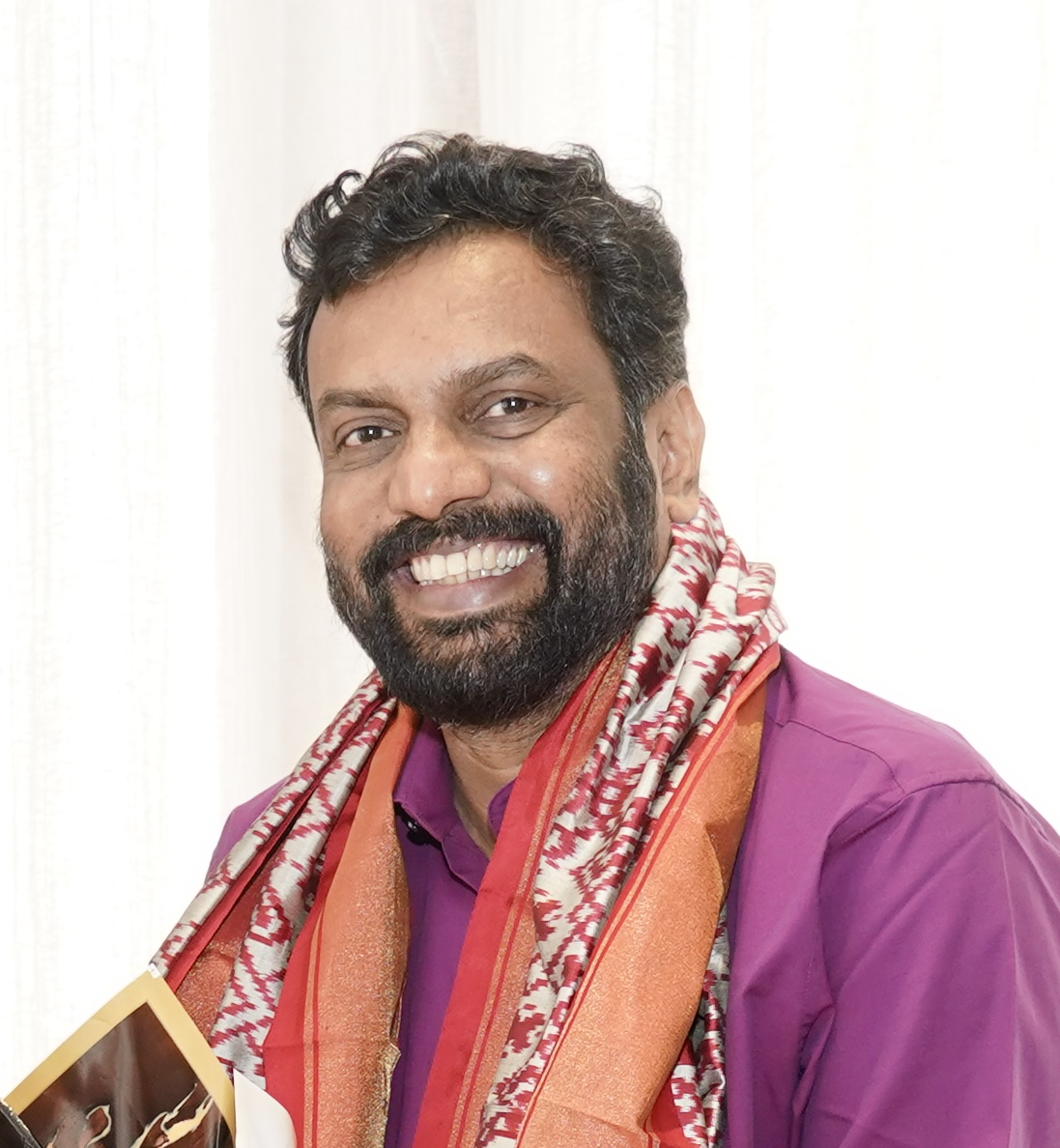

Member of Parliament, Rajya Sabha
- Incumbent
- Assumed office 4 April 2022
- Preceded by: M. V. Shreyams Kumar
- Constituency: Kerala

Personal details
- Born: Padiyoor, Irikkur, Kannur
- Party: Communist Party of India
- Education: (BA Economics;LLB) SN College, Kannur, Kerala Law Academy Law College, Thiruvananthapuram, University of Kerala, Thiruvanathapuram
- Alma mater: Kerala Law Academy

Prabhakaran Sandosh Kumar is a member of the Rajya Sabha, from the state of Kerala and a leader of the Communist Party of India.

== Early life ==
He was born to K P Prabhakaran Nambiar and P V Radha in 1971 at Padiyoor in Irikoor, Kerala. Although born in Padiyoor, his primary residence is in Chittariparamba, Kannur.

== Political career ==
He is serving as a national executive member of the Communist Party of India (CPI). He was also the former AIYF national general secretary and president.

He also served as the CPI Kannur District Secretary and the syndicate member of Kannur University
