= Joseph Mathen =

Indian politician

Joseph Mathen (1917–1995) was a member of the Kerala state Legislative assembly and the Rajya Sabha (1960–1966). Mr. Mathen represented Indian National Congress in both the Kerala assembly and Rajya Sabha. Mr. Mathen was one of the three general secretaries of the Kerala Pradesh Congress Committee. He has also actively participated in the formation of KSU.
