= Kesavan Thazhava =

Indian politician

Kesavan Thazhava (26 March 1903 – 28 November 1969) was an Indian politician from Kerala. He belonged to the Communist Party of India (Marxist). He was born in Thazhava(Thadathil veedu) in Karunagappally, Kollam District

== Career ==
He served as the 11th General Secretary of S.N.D.P Yogam, serving from 1935 to 1936. He was a member of Travancore Sree Moolam Popular Assembly from 1937 to 1938. He represented Kerala in Rajya Sabha, the Council of States of India parliament, from 1967 to 1973, and was a leader of the Communist Party of India (Marxist).

== Personal life ==
He had a daughter, Rema Bai, who married Mahadevan, a rankholder in L.L.B. from Aligarh University

He died on 28 November 1969.
