= V. Sivadasan =

Indian politician from Kerala

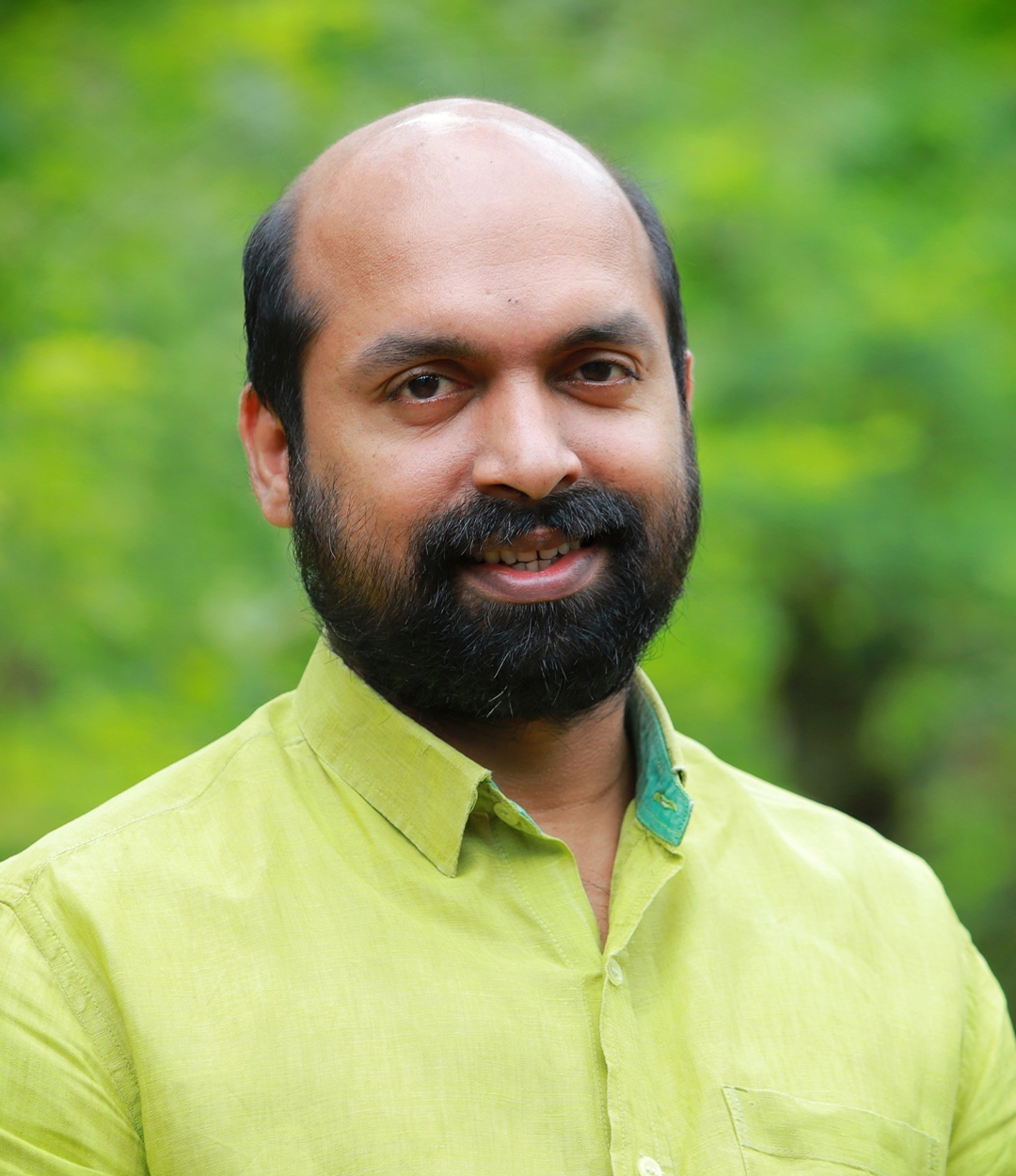

Member of Parliament, Rajya Sabha forKerala
- Incumbent
- Assumed office 8 June 2021
- Constituency: Kerala

Personal details
- Born: 1979 (age 47) Iritty, Kannur, India
- Party: Communist Party of India (Marxist)
- Education: Post Doctoral Fellow
- Alma mater: Jawaharlal Nehru University, New Delhi; Kannur University
- Website: https://vsivadasan.com/

V. Sivadasan (born 1979) is an Indian Marxist politician from Kerala state belonging to the Communist Party of India (Marxist) and a Rajya Sabha member from Kerala. He was also the Independent Director of Kerala State Electricity Board.

== Personal life ==
V. Sivadasan was born in 1979 to K. Narayanan and V. Madhavi in Iritty, Kannur. His wife is Sahana and she belongs to Panoli, Kannur.

== Education ==
V. Sivadasan completed his high school education from Pala Government High School, Kannur. He completed his pre degree from Pazhassi Raja N.S.S. College, Mattannur. He did his Masters from Government Brennen College, Thalassery. He obtained Ph.D. from Kannur University in 2010 for his doctoral thesis "Agrarian Problems and the Role of Media and Literature in Kerala with special reference to Socio-Economic Transformation 1934-1971". He was awarded Post Doctoral Fellowship by Jawaharlal Nehru University.

== Political life ==
=== Student politics ===
V. Sivadasan entered politics through active participation in Balasangham and Students' Federation of India. He was enrolled as a SFI member while studying at Pala government school, Kannur and became its unit secretary. In 1994 January, the student activist Sivadasan studying in eight standard got arrested by police for defying the prohibitionary orders around Koothuparambu and participating in district conference.

Sivadasan has held the responsibility of being the Area Secretary of SFI committee in Peravoor, and then both the presidentship and secretaryship of Kannur district committee. He became the University Union Chairman of Kannur University in 2006. In the same year, he was elected as the state vice president of SFI committee in Kerala. He later became the state joint secretary of the committee.

By 2008, V. Sivadasan entered the realm of national student politics by being the All India Joint Secretary of Students' Federation of India. In the 14th All India Conference of SFI which was held at Madurai, Tamil Nadu in 2012, Sivadasan became the All India President of Students' Federation of India. In 2013, V Sivadasan along with M. B. Rajesh faced police brutality in a protest action at national capital demanding the removal of P. J. Kurien (then Rajya Sabha Deputy Chairman) for his alleged involvement in the Suryanelli rape case. After few months he along with his fellow comrades was jailed in Tihar Prison, New Delhi for the SFI's protest demonstration against the Solar Scam in Kerala during UDF government. He faced brutal police atrocity after SFI launched protest action outside Himachal Pradesh Vidhan Sabha against the fee hike in Himachal Pradesh University on 18 March 2015. CPI(M) demanded judicial probe on this matter and met Governor Kalyan Singh and submitted a memorandum. Under the leadership of Sivadasan, SFI initiated alliance with Ambedkar Students Association (ASA) in Pondicherry University.

Against the raid conducted by Delhi Police for alleged consumption of Beef in Kerala house, Sivadasan organised huge protest demonstrations in New Delhi and argued it as an attack on Indian Secularism.

=== Party politics ===
Sivadasan is the state committee member of Communist Party of India (Marxist) in Kerala. He was entrusted with the responsibility of organising the celebration of Malayalam month of Karkidakkam for CPI(M). He argued that its the responsibility of secular people to protect the plurality of faith. He is also the head of CPI(M) IT wing and education sub-committee in Kerala. He was the convenor of ‘Youth Summit on Future Kerala’, a two-day conclave being organised by the AKG Study and Research in 2021.

==== Member of Parliament ====
Sivadasan is a member of Rajya Sabha. He was elected unopposed from Kerala on 25 April 2021.

As a parliamentarian, V Sivadasan urged the HRD Minister to revoke Professor Gilbert Sebastian's suspension for calling the RSS a "Proto-fascist" organisation, and demanded to put an end to the attempts to constrain academic freedom. Protesting against the maladministration of Praful Patel in Lakshadweep, he said "reducing natives to second-class citizens in their own homeland is not acceptable." He also staged protest on 31 May 2021 accusing the central government of trying to abolish the special rights of Lakshadweep.

== Books ==
- Higher Education in India: Politics and Policies (Co-authored with Dr Abhilash Babu), Current Books: 2019.
- Peasants Media Literature; Agrarian Problems in Kerala: Role of the Media and Literature (1934-1971), Current Books: 2017.
