= John Brittas =

Indian journalist and politician (born 1966)

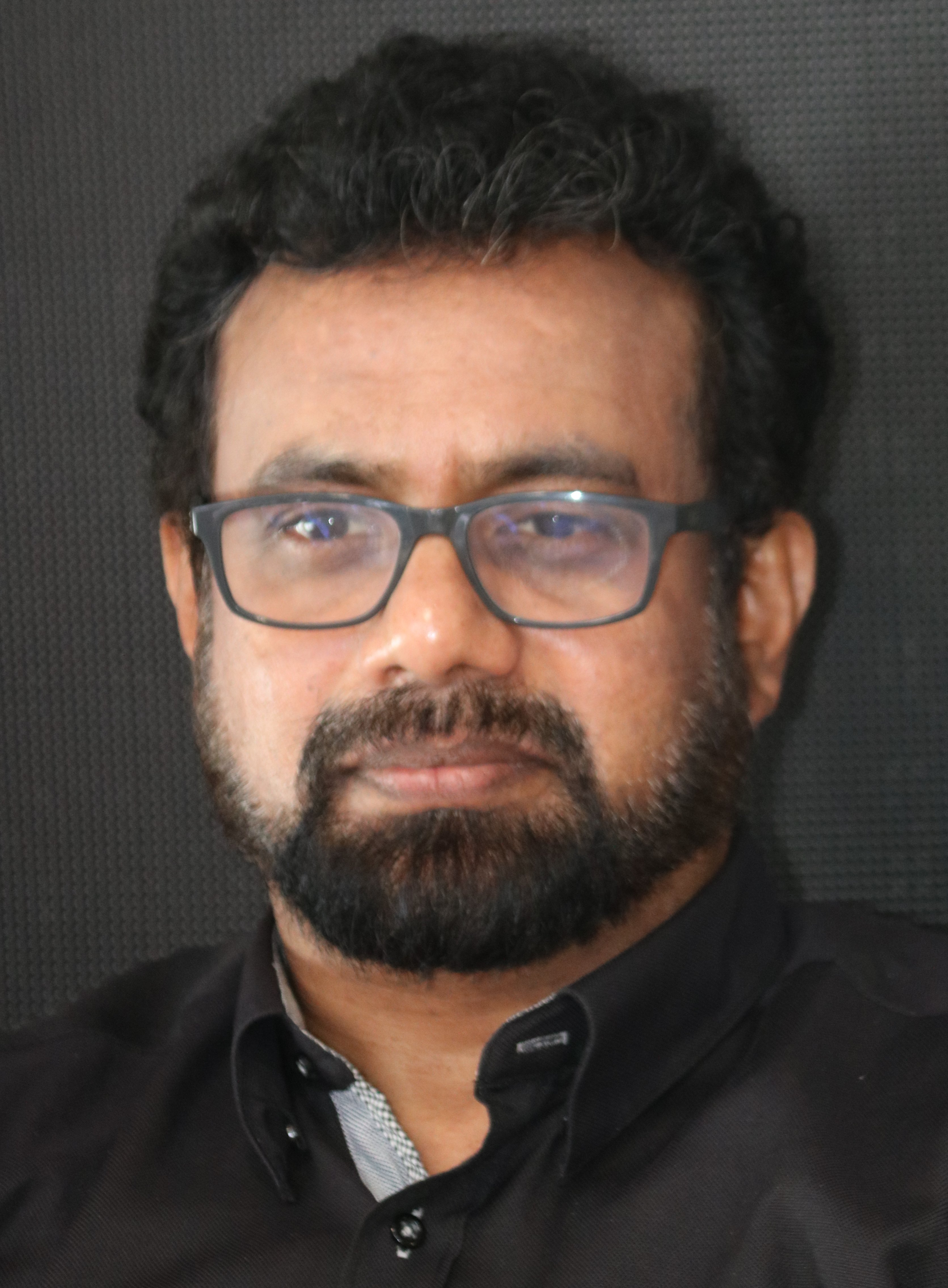
- Brittas

Member of Parliament, Rajya Sabha
- Incumbent
- Assumed office 8 June 2021
- Preceded by: K. K. Ragesh
- Constituency: Kerala
- Born: 15 May 1966 (age 60); Naduvil, Kannur district, Kerala, India
- Other name: Brittas
- Education: Sir Syed College, Taliparamba (pre-degree); Payyanur College (BA); Sree Kerala Varma College, Thrissur (MA) in Political Sciences Jawaharlal Nehru University (PhD)
- Occupation: Journalist
- Known for: Managing Director of Kairali TV and former Business head of Asianet Communications Member of Rajya Sabha
- Television: Asianet; Kairali TV
- Political party: Communist Party of India (Marxist)
- Spouse: Sheeba
- Children: 2
- Website: brittas.in

John Brittas (born 15 May 1966) is an Indian politician, journalist, and managing director and chief editor of Malayalam Communications Ltd., which owns the entertainment channel Kairali TV and the news channel Kairali News. He is a parliamentarian who has represented the Communist Party of India (Marxist) in the upper house of the Indian Parliament since June 2021. He was one of the advisors to the Chief Minister of Kerala, Shri Pinarayi Vijayan from 2016 till 2021. He is currently the CPI(M) parliamentary party leader in Rajya Sabha.

He has been a member of the Parliamentary Consultative Committee for the Ministry of Electronics and Information Technology since October 2024 and member of the Parliamentary Committee on Ministry of External Affairs (India) since September 2024. According to Indian parliamentary data by PRS Legislative Research, Dr. John Brittas is one of the most active members in parliamentary debates and discussions, having participated in 889 debates—nearly ten times the national average of 90.3 and significantly higher than the state average of 336.2. With a 94% attendance record, 375 questions raised (well above the national average of 168.52), and 16 Private Member’s Bills introduced (compared to the national average of 1.2), his engagement in legislative proceedings stands out among his peers.

== Early life and education ==
John Brittas was born on 15 May 1966 at Naduvil, Kannur district, Kerala to A. P. Paily and Annamma. After primary education in a nearby school, he attended high school at Don Bosco Higher Secondary School, Mannuthy, Thrissur. He went to Sir Syed College, Taliparamba in Kannur for his pre-degree studies. He did his bachelor's degree in political science from Payyanur College, and master's degree in political science from Sree Kerala Varma College, Thrissur. He also enrolled for his law degree at the Kerala Law Academy College, Thiruvananthapuram, from which he graduated with first rank. Brittas completed his Master of Philosophy (M Phil) in 1996 and doctorate in 2022 from the Jawaharlal Nehru University, New Delhi.

Brittas was active in student politics during his college days and was one of the office bearers of the University Students Union.

== Career ==
Though he had a flair for writing and was involved in literary activities during college, his entry into journalism was by chance. With the sole intention of securing a job, he applied for the post of sub-editor in Deshabhimani, the mouthpiece journal of the Communist Party of India (Marxist), and was selected. A while later when he moved to New Delhi for higher studies, the newspaper transferred him to its Delhi office, letting him study and work simultaneously. In Delhi, he was first assigned to escort the then CPI(M) chief minister of Kerala to Punjab for a discussion with the leaders of the Akali Movement, which was seeking independent statehood for Punjab. Brittas often credits the exposure he received in Delhi at a young age for his achievements. Arriving in Delhi at a time when the political stage of India was undergoing radical changes, he became a witness to many major changes that shaped the country's future both on the home front and in global geopolitics.

By the time Kairali TV was launching under Malayalam Communications Ltd by Communist Party of India (Marxist) in the year 2000, Brittas had become a seasoned media personality. He was an ideal choice to head the Delhi Bureau for Kairali TV. Brittas took it as an opportunity to try out the electronic media, after a long association with the print media. Upon heading the Delhi office for three years, he was elevated as the managing director of the channel and posted at its headquarters in Thiruvananthapuram.

After an eleven-year stint at Malayalam Communications Ltd., he moved to its competitor Asianet Communications Limited in 2011 as its Business Head. He returned to Kairali TV almost two years later in February 2013.

At Kairali TV and Asianet (TV channel), he ran popular interview programmes, besides his other responsibilities, such as Question Time, Cross Fire, JB Junction (Kairali TV) and Nammal Thammil (Asianet) that have gained huge appreciation from the viewers. He now regularly contributes opinions and analyses on contemporary socio-political issues to various Indian media outlets. He has also authored many books in Malayalam such as Chillujalakakkootil, Innocent Samsarikunnu, Malayalathinte Manavikatha, Sthreeparvam and Marayillathe. He also acted in the lead role in Malayalam movie,Vellivelichathil released in 2014, which received mixed reviews.

Brittas was the youngest journalist to secure the Central Hall pass in the Parliament. He has covered parliamentary proceedings for both Kairali TV and Desabhimani. He did first-hand reporting on the general elections between 1991 and 1999. He also covered the general elections in Nepal soon after the death of King Birendra of Nepal. He was one of the first Indian journalists to reach Baghdad soon after the launch of America's Iraq war in 2003. From the war-torn areas, he not only reported for his channel but also wrote for various Indian newspapers.

His maiden speech in the Rajya Sabha (Council of States) on the role of the judiciary and the appointment of judges in the Supreme Court of India and High Courts of India was praised by the Vice President of India and the chairman of Rajya Sabha Venkaiah Naidu.

== Awards and accolades ==
He received the Journalism Educational Award from the Goenka Foundation for his research on "The Impact of Globalization in Print Media".

== Television ==
As Host

year	Program	Channel	Notes
2008-2010	Question Time	Kairali TV	
2010-2011	Cross fire	Kairali TV	
2012-2013	Nammal Thammil	Asianet	
2014–2020	J.B.junction	Kairali TV	
2018–2020	Njan Malayalee	Kairali TV	
2021	Votography	Kairali TV	
