= K. K. Ragesh =

Indian politician (born 1970)

K.K. Ragesh

MP of Rajya Sabha for Kerala
- In office 22 April 2015 – 22 April 2021
- Constituency: Kerala

District Secretary, CPIM Kannur

Personal details
- Born: 13 May 1970 (age 56) Kanhirode, Kannur, Kerala, India
- Party: CPI(M)
- Spouse: Priya Varghese
- Education: Kerala Law Academy Law College
- Profession: Politician

K.K. Ragesh is an Indian politician and member of the Communist Party of India (Marxist). He was elected as a member of the Rajya Sabha the Upper house of Indian Parliament from Kerala in 2015. He was earlier the president of the Students Federation of India. In 2020, he received Parliamentary Group for Children (PGC) Award for the commendable work done in the parliament for the protection of the rights of children and students.

On 21 September 2020, Ragesh along with seven other members were suspended from the Rajya Sabha for their unruly behavior in the house by tearing documents, breaking mic and heckling the Deputy Chairman of the Rajya Sabha. Their actions were condemned by several leaders.

In May 2021, Ragesh has been appointed as the private secretary to the Chief Minister of Kerala.

In April 2025, K.K. Ragesh was appointed as the CPI(M) Kannur district secretary.
