= P. V. Abdul Wahab =

Indian politician

P. V. Abdul Wahab MP
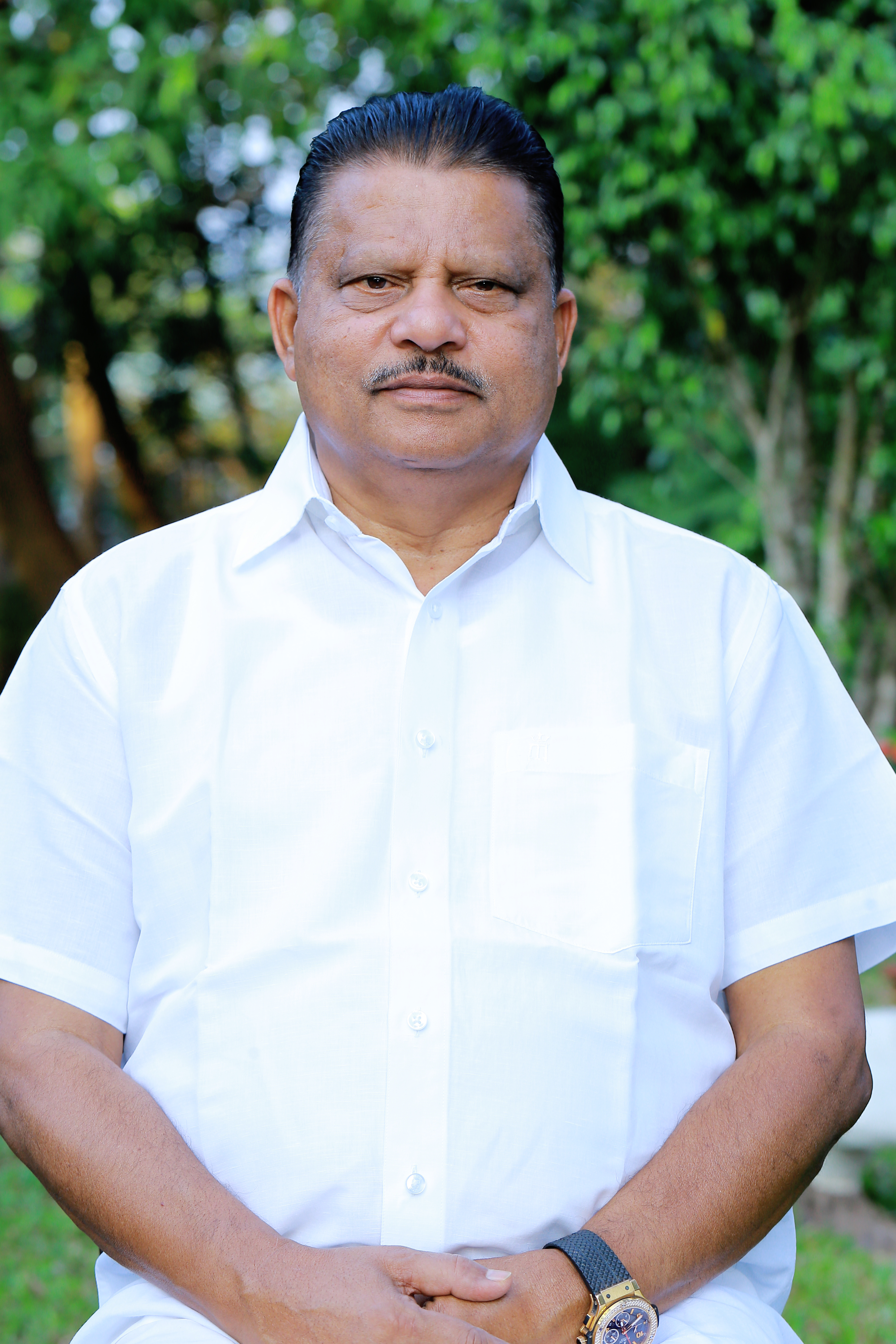
- Wahab in 2018

Member of Parliament, Rajya Sabha
- Incumbent
- Assumed office 22 April 2015
- Constituency: Kerala
- In office 2004–2010
- Constituency: Kerala

Personal details
- Born: 1 July 1950 (age 76) Nilambur, India
- Party: Indian Union Muslim League
- Spouse: Yasmine Wahab
- Parents: P. V. Alavikutty (father); V. Fathima
- Education: Dr. Gafoor Memorial MES Mampad College

Pulikkal Veettil Abdul Wahab (born 1 July 1950) is an Indian entrepreneur, politician and philanthropist from Nilambur, Malappuram. He currently serves as a Member of Parliament from Kerala in the Rajya Sabha (the Council of States or the Upper House). He is also a non-resident Indian businessman with activities in India and the Middle East.

Wahab also serves as the Treasurer, Indian Union Muslim League and Leader, Indian Union Muslim League in Rajya Sabha. He has been elected as Member of Rajya Sabha from Kerala thrice (2004–10, 2015–21, and 2021 to the present). He is currently a member of the Parliamentary Committee on External Affairs.

== Life and career ==
Wahab was born on 1 July 1950 to P. V. (Pulikkal Veettil) Alavikutty and Varikkodan Fathima at Nilambur in northern Kerala. He was educated at Government Manavedan High School, Nilambur and M. E. S College, Mampad.

He is married to Yasmine from 1976 and the couple has four sons. He was first elected to the Rajya Sabha in 2004.

=== Parliamentary committees ===
- Committee on Social Justice and Empowerment (2004–2010)
- Committee on Rules (2015–2018)
- Committee on Chemicals and Fertilizers (2015–2019)
- Railway Convention Committee (2016–2019)
- Committee on External Affairs (2019–2021)
- Committee on Industry (2021–2022)

=== Consultative Committees ===
- Consultative Committee for the Ministry of Civil Aviation (2004–2010)
- Consultative Committee for the Ministry of Human Resource Development (2015–2019)
- Consultative Committee for the Ministry of Minority Affairs (2019–2021)

=== Business portfolio ===
- Head, Peevees and Bridgeway Group (in India, United Arab Emirates, Qatar and Saudi Arabia)
- Chairman, Indus Motors, Kerala
- Director, Malabar Institute of Medical Sciences
- Director, Feroke Boards, Kozhikode
- Director, Cheraman Financial Services
- Centre Square Shopping Mall, Cochin
- Amal College of Advanced Studies, Nilambur

=== Social profile ===
- Chairman, Peevees Charitable Trust
- Chairman, Keraleeyam (an NGO for HIV affected people)
- Chairman, Calicut Airport Development Committee, 1994–2004
- Chairman, Jan Sikshan Sansthan (an NGO sponsored by the Ministry of Human Resource Development)
- Patron, Nilambur Orphanage
- President, Peevees Schools
- Member
  - Islamic Chair, Calicut University
  - Kerala State Haj Committee, Kozhikode.
  - Kerala Waqf Board, Kochi.
  - Chairman, Malabar Airport Development Action Committee (MADAC)
  - Malabar Development Board
  - Malabar Chamber of Commerce
  - Rajiv Gandhi International Sports Foundation (former)

=== Recognitions ===
- Confucius Prize for Literacy, UNESCO (2016) for Jan Sikshan Sansthan.
- Saakshar Bharat Award (2014) for Jan Sikshan Sansthan.

Wahab has 'adopted' Karulayi village near his municipality, Nilambur, under the Sansad Adarsh Gram Yojana (SAGY) project.

== Electoral History ==
=== Rajya Sabha ===
Position	Party	Constituency	From	To	Tenure
Member of Parliament, Rajya Sabha (1st Term)	IUML	Kerala	3 April 2004	2 April 2010	5 years, 364 days
Member of Parliament, Rajya Sabha (2nd Term)	IUML	Kerala	22 April 2015	21 April 2021	5 years, 364 days
Member of Parliament, Rajya Sabha (3rd Term)	IUML	Kerala	24 April 2021	23 April 2027	5 years, 364 days
