= Rajya Sabha =

Upper house of the Indian Parliament

Coordinates: 28°37′0″N 77°12′30″E

Type
- Type: Upper house of the Parliament of India
- Term limits: 6 years for each member; One third of members retire every 2 years

Leadership
- Chairman: C. P. Radhakrishnan since 12 September 2025
- Deputy Chairman: Harivansh Narayan Singh, NOM since 9 August 2018
- Leader of the House: Jagat Prakash Nadda, BJP since 24 June 2024
- Leader of the Opposition: Mallikarjun Kharge, INC since 16 February 2021
- Secretary General: Pramod Chandra Mody since 12 November 2021

Structure
- Seats: 245 (233 elected and 12 nominated)
- Political groups: Government (152) NDA (152): BJP (117) (Note: Including 5 nominated members.); AIADMK (4); JD(U) (4); NCP (4); TDP (4); SHS (2); AGP (1); JSP (1); NPP (1); PMK (1); RLD (1); RLM (1); RPI(A) (1); IND (3) (Note: Kartikeya Sharma in Haryana, Parimal Nathwani in Jharkhand and Dilip Ray in Odisha.); NOM (7); Official Opposition (64); INDIA (64): INC (30); MAITC (9); SP (5); CPI(M) (3); JKNC (3); JMM (3); RJD (3); CPI (2); IUML (2); KC(M) (1); NCP-SP (1); SS(UBT) (1); IND (1) (Note: Kapil Sibal in Uttar Pradesh); Other opposition (28): DMK (8); BJD (5); YSRCP (4); AAP (3); BRS (3); UPPL (2); DMDK (1); MNM (1); ZPM (1); Vacant (1) Vacant (1)

Elections
- Voting system: 233 members by single transferable vote by state legislatures 12 members appointed by the president
- First election: 1952
- Last election: 2026
- Next election: 2027

Meeting place
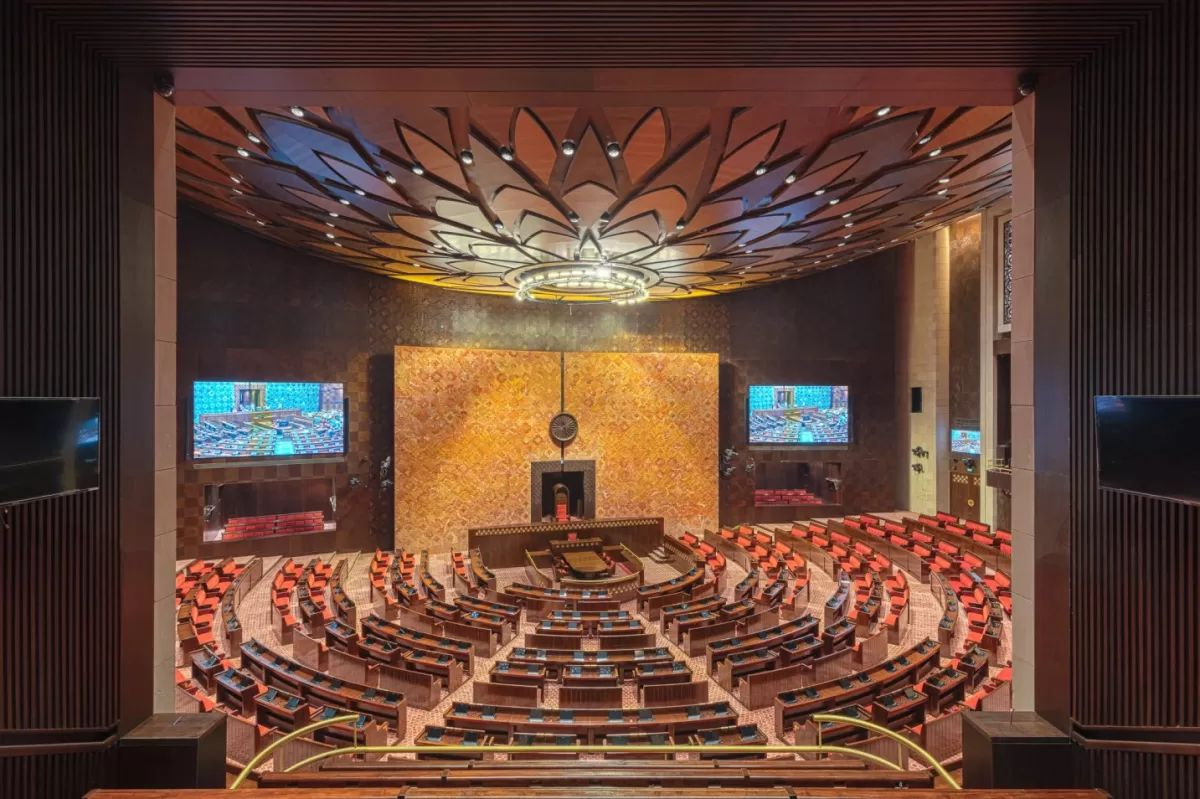
- Rajya Sabha Chamber, Sansad Bhavan, 118, Rafi Marg, New Delhi, Delhi, India – 110001

Website
- sansad.in/rs

Constitution
- Constitution of India

Rules
- The Rules of Procedure and Conduct of Business in the Council of States (Rajya Sabha) (English)

The Rajya Sabha, also known as Council of States, is the upper house of the Parliament of India, of which the Lok Sabha is the lower house. The Rajya Sabha represents India's federal units – the states and union territories. Where the Lok Sabha is directly elected by the population, the Rajya Sabha is composed of members chosen by the state and union territory legislatures, giving the states a formal role in national law-making. Unlike the Lok Sabha, it is a permanent house and cannot be dissolved.

The council has a maximum membership of 245, of which 233 are indirectly elected by the state legislative assemblies of India and union territories using single transferable votes through open ballots, while the President of India can nominate 12 members for their contributions to art, literature, science, and social service. The total allowed capacity is 250 (238 elected, 12 appointed) according to article 80 of the Constitution of India. The current potential seating capacity of the Rajya Sabha is 245 (233 elected, 12 appointed), after the Jammu and Kashmir Reorganisation Act. The maximum seats of 250 members can be filled up at the discretion and requirements of the council.

Members sit for staggered terms lasting six years, with about a third of the 233 members retiring every two years, in even-numbered years. Unlike the Lok Sabha, the Rajya Sabha is a continuing chamber and hence not subject to dissolution.

The Rajya Sabha has equal footing in legislation with the Lok Sabha, except in the area of loss of supply, where the latter has overriding powers. In the case of a deadlock, a joint session of parliament can be held, where the Lok Sabha holds a greater influence because of its larger membership. The vice president of India is the ex-officio chairman of the Rajya Sabha, who presides over its sessions. The Deputy Chairman of the Rajya Sabha, who is elected from amongst the house's members, takes care of the day-to-day matters of the house in the absence of the chairman. The council held its first sitting on 13 May 1952.

The Rajya Sabha meets in the eponymous chamber in Parliament House in New Delhi. Since 18 July 2018, the Rajya Sabha has the facility for simultaneous interpretation in all the languages with official status in India. Rajya Sabha proceedings are televised live on channel Sansad TV, headquartered within the premises of Parliament. The new parliament building has a seating capacity of 384 for the Rajya Sabha.

== Qualifications ==
Article 84 of the Constitution lays down the qualifications for membership of Parliament. A member of the Rajya Sabha must:

- Be a citizen of India.
- Make and subscribe before some person authorized in that behalf by the Election Commission an oath or affirmation according to the form set out for the purpose in the Third Schedule to the Constitution.
- Be at least 30 years old.
- Not be a proclaimed criminal.
- Not be a subject of insolvency, i.e. they should not be in debt that they are not capable of repaying in a current manner and should have the ability to meet their financial expenses.
- Not hold any other office of profit under the Government of India.
- Not be of unsound mind.
- Possess such other qualifications as may be prescribed in that behalf by or under any law made by Parliament.

== Membership ==
=== Elected members ===
Based on the § Qualifications, 233 members are elected by the Legislative Assemblies of States and Union territories by means of single transferable vote through proportional representation.

=== Nominated members ===
Based on the qualifications, twelve members are nominated by the President of India who have special knowledge in various areas like arts and science. However, they are not entitled to vote in presidential elections as per Article 55 of the Constitution.

== Limitations ==
The Constitution of India places some restrictions on the Rajya Sabha, and the Lok Sabha (the lower house, House of the People) is more powerful in certain areas.

=== Money bills ===
The definition of a money bill is given in Article 110 of the Constitution of India. A money bill can be introduced only in the Lok Sabha by a minister and only on the recommendation of the president of India. After the Lok Sabha passes a money bill, it sends the bill to the Rajya Sabha for 14 days, during which it can make recommendations. If the Rajya Sabha fails to return the bill in 14 days to the Lok Sabha, the bill is deemed to have passed both houses. Also, if the Lok Sabha rejects any (or all) of the amendments proposed by the Rajya Sabha, the bill is deemed to have been passed by both houses of Parliament in the form the Lok Sabha finally passes it. Hence, the Rajya Sabha can only give recommendations for a money bill, and cannot amend it. This is to ensure that the Rajya Sabha does not add any non-money matters to the bill. There is no joint sitting of both the houses for money bills, because all final decisions are taken by the Lok Sabha.

=== Joint Sitting of the Parliament ===
Article 108 provides for a joint sitting of the two houses of Parliament in certain cases. A joint sitting can be convened by the president of India when one house has either rejected a bill passed by the other house, has not taken any action on a bill transmitted to it by the other house for six months, or has disagreed with the amendments proposed by the Lok Sabha on a bill passed by it. Considering that the numerical strength of the Lok Sabha is more than twice that of the Rajya Sabha, the Lok Sabha tends to have a greater influence in a joint sitting of Parliament. A joint session is chaired by the speaker of the Lok Sabha. Also, because the joint session is convened by the president on the advice of the government, which already has a majority in the Lok Sabha, the joint session is usually convened to get bills passed through a Rajya Sabha in which the government has a minority.

Joint sessions of Parliament are a rarity, and have been convened three times in the last 71 years, for passage of a specific legislative act, the latest time being in 2002:

- 1961: Dowry Prohibition Act, 1958
- 1978: Banking Services Commission (Repeal) Act, 1977
- 2002: Prevention of Terrorism Act, 2002

=== No-confidence motion ===
Unlike the Lok Sabha, members of the Rajya Sabha cannot bring to the house a no-confidence motion against the government.

== Powers ==
In the Indian quasi-federal structure, the Rajya Sabha is representative of the states and union territories in the federal legislature (hence the name, Council of States). For this reason, the Rajya Sabha has powers that protect the rights of states against the Union (federal) government.

=== Union-State relations ===
The Constitution empowers the Parliament of India to make laws on the matters reserved for States. However, this can only be done if the Rajya Sabha first passes a resolution by a two-thirds majority granting such a power to the Union Parliament. The Union government cannot make a law on a matter reserved for States without any authorisation from the Rajya Sabha.

The Union government reserves the power to make laws directly affecting the citizens across all the States whereas, a single state in itself reserves the power to make rules and governing laws of their region. The Rajya Sabha plays a vital role in protecting the States' culture and interests.

=== Creation of All-India services ===
The Rajya Sabha, by a two-thirds super majority, can pass a resolution empowering the Indian government to create more all-India services common to both the union and the states.

== Party position ==
Number of members of parliament by party-wise and their floor leaders (As on 22 November 2026):

Alliance	Political party	No. of MPs	Floor leader of the party
Government; NDA; Seats: 151	Bharatiya Janata Party	116	Jagat Prakash Nadda (Leader of the House)
Government; NDA; Seats: 151	All India Anna Dravida Munnetra Kazhagam	4	M. Thambi Durai
Government; NDA; Seats: 151	Janata Dal (United)	4	Sanjay Kumar Jha
Government; NDA; Seats: 151	Nationalist Congress Party	4	Praful Patel
Government; NDA; Seats: 151	Telugu Desam Party	4	Sana Sathish Babu
Government; NDA; Seats: 151	Shiv Sena	2	Milind Murli Deora
Government; NDA; Seats: 151	Asom Gana Parishad	1	Birendra Prasad Baishya
Government; NDA; Seats: 151	Janasena Party	1	Lingamaneni Ramesh
Government; NDA; Seats: 151	National People's Party	1	James Pangsang Kongkal Sangma
Government; NDA; Seats: 151	Pattali Makkal Katchi	1	Anbumani Ramadoss
Government; NDA; Seats: 151	Rashtriya Lok Dal	1	Jayant Chaudhary
Government; NDA; Seats: 151	Rashtriya Lok Morcha	1	Upendra Kushwaha
Government; NDA; Seats: 151	Republican Party of India (Athawale)	1	Ramdas Bandu Athawale
Government; NDA; Seats: 151	Independent	3	Steady
Government; NDA; Seats: 151	Nominated	7	Steady
Opposition; INDIA; Seats: 63	Indian National Congress	30	Mallikarjun Kharge (Leader of the Opposition)
Opposition; INDIA; Seats: 63	Mamata All India Trinamool Congress	9	Derek O'Brien
Opposition; INDIA; Seats: 63	Samajwadi Party	4	Ram Gopal Yadav
Opposition; INDIA; Seats: 63	Communist Party of India (Marxist)	3	John Brittas
Opposition; INDIA; Seats: 63	Jammu & Kashmir National Conference	3	Chowdry Mohammad Ramzan
Opposition; INDIA; Seats: 63	Jharkhand Mukti Morcha	3	Sarfraz Ahmad
Opposition; INDIA; Seats: 63	Rashtriya Janata Dal	3	Faiyaz Ahmad
Opposition; INDIA; Seats: 63	Communist Party of India	2	P. Sandosh Kumar
Opposition; INDIA; Seats: 63	Indian Union Muslim League	2	Abdul Wahab
Opposition; INDIA; Seats: 63	Kerala Congress (M)	1	Jose K. Mani
Opposition; INDIA; Seats: 63	Nationalist Congress Party – Sharadchandra Pawar	1	Sharadchandra Pawar
Opposition; INDIA; Seats: 63	Shiv Sena (Uddhav Balasaheb Thackeray)	1	Sanjay Raut
Opposition; INDIA; Seats: 63	Independent	1	Steady
Others; Seats: 29	Dravida Munnetra Kazhagam	8	Tiruchi Siva
Others; Seats: 29	Biju Janata Dal	5	Manas Ranjan Mangaraj
Others; Seats: 29	Yuvajana Sramika Rythu Congress Party	4	Yerram Venkata Subba Reddy
Others; Seats: 29	Aam Aadmi Party	3	Sanjay Singh
Others; Seats: 29	Bharat Rashtra Samithi	3	Ravi Chandra Vaddiraju
Others; Seats: 29	United People's Party, Liberal	2	Pramod Boro
Others; Seats: 29	Bahujan Samaj Party	1	Ramji
Others; Seats: 29	Desiya Murpokku Dravida Kazhagam	1	L. K. Sudhish
Others; Seats: 29	Makkal Needhi Maiam	1	Kamal Haasan
Others; Seats: 29	Zoram People's Movement	1	Khiangte Laltluangkima
Vacant; Seat: 2	Madhya Pradesh	1	N/A
Vacant; Seat: 2	Uttar Pradesh	1	N/A
Total		245	

== Composition ==
Seats are allotted in proportion to the population of each state or union territory. Because of population changes since previous apportionment of seats, states which once had higher relative populations may have more seats than other states which currently have a higher population. For example, Tamil Nadu has 18 representatives for 72 million inhabitants (in 2011) whereas Bihar (104 million) and West Bengal (91 million) only have 16. As the members are elected by the state legislature, some small union territories, those without legislatures, cannot have representation. Hence, Andaman and Nicobar Islands, Chandigarh, Dadra and Nagar Haveli and Daman and Diu, Ladakh and Lakshadweep do not send any representatives. Twelve members are nominated by the president.

As per the Fourth Schedule to the Constitution of India on 26 January 1950, the Rajya Sabha was to consist of 216 members, of which 12 members were to be nominated by the president and the remaining 204 elected to represent the states. The present sanctioned strength of the Rajya Sabha in the Constitution of India is 250, which can be increased by constitutional amendment. However, the present strength is 245 members according to the Representation of People Act, 1951, which can be increased up to 250 by amending the act itself, of whom 233 are representatives of the states and union territories and 12 are nominated by the president. The 12 nominated members of the Rajya Sabha are persons who are eminent in particular fields and are well-known contributors in the particular field.

=== Number of members by state/union territory ===
State/UT	Seats	Largest party		NDA		INDIA		Others		Vacant	Election cycle(s)
Andhra Pradesh	11	TDP	4	TDP	4	-		YSRCP	4	-	2028 (4); 2030 (3); 2032 (4)
Andhra Pradesh	11	TDP	4	BJP	2	-		YSRCP	4	-	2028 (4); 2030 (3); 2032 (4)
Andhra Pradesh	11	TDP	4	JSP	1	-		YSRCP	4	-	2028 (4); 2030 (3); 2032 (4)
Arunachal Pradesh	1	BJP	1	BJP	1	-		-		-	2032 (1)
Assam	7	BJP	4	BJP	4	-		UPPL	2	-	2028 (2); 2031 (2); 2032 (3)
Assam	7	BJP	4	AGP	1	-		UPPL	2	-	2028 (2); 2031 (2); 2032 (3)
Bihar	16	BJP	7	BJP	7	RJD	3	-		-	2028 (5); 2030 (6); 2032 (5)
Bihar	16	BJP	7	JD(U)	4	INC	1	-		-	2028 (5); 2030 (6); 2032 (5)
Bihar	16	BJP	7	RLM	1			-		-	2028 (5); 2030 (6); 2032 (5)
Chhattisgarh	5	INC	3	BJP	2	INC	3	-		-	2028 (2); 2030 (1); 2032 (2)
Delhi	3	AAP	2	BJP	1	-		AAP	2	-	2030 (3)
Goa	1	BJP	1	BJP	1	-				-	2029 (1)
Gujarat	11	BJP	11	BJP	11	-		-		-	2029 (3); 2030 (4); 2032 (4)
Haryana	5	BJP	3	BJP	3	INC	1	-		-	2028 (2); 2030 (1); 2032 (2)
Haryana	5	BJP	3	IND	1	INC	1	-		-	2028 (2); 2030 (1); 2032 (2)
Himachal Pradesh	3	BJP	2	BJP	2	INC	1	-		-	2028 (1); 2030 (1); 2032 (1)
Jammu and Kashmir	4	JKNC	3	BJP	1	JKNC	3	-		-	2031 (4)
Jharkhand	6	JMM	3	BJP	2	JMM	3	-		-	2026 (2); 2028 (2); 2030 (2)
Jharkhand	6	JMM	3	IND	1	JMM	3	-		-	2026 (2); 2028 (2); 2030 (2)
Karnataka	12	INC	7	BJP	5	INC	7	-		-	2028 (4); 2030 (4); 2032 (4)
Kerala	9	CPI(M)	3	-		CPI(M)	3	-		-	2027 (3); 2028 (3); 2030 (3)
Kerala	9	CPI(M)	3	-		CPI	2	-		-	2027 (3); 2028 (3); 2030 (3)
Kerala	9	CPI(M)	3	-		IUML	2	-		-	2027 (3); 2028 (3); 2030 (3)
Kerala	9	CPI(M)	3	-		INC	1	-		-	2027 (3); 2028 (3); 2030 (3)
Kerala	9	CPI(M)	3	-		KC(M)	1	-		-	2027 (3); 2028 (3); 2030 (3)
Madhya Pradesh	11	BJP	9	BJP	9	INC	2	-		-	2028 (3); 2030 (5); 2032 (3)
Maharashtra	19	BJP	8	BJP	8	INC	2	-		-	2028 (6); 2030 (6); 2032 (7)
Maharashtra	19	BJP	8	NCP	4	NCP-SP	1	-		-	2028 (6); 2030 (6); 2032 (7)
Maharashtra	19	BJP	8	SS	2	SS(UBT)	1	-		-	2028 (6); 2030 (6); 2032 (7)
Maharashtra	19	BJP	8	RPI(A)	1			-		-	2028 (6); 2030 (6); 2032 (7)
Manipur	1	BJP	1	BJP	1	-		-		-	2032 (1)
Meghalaya	1	NPP	1	NPP	1	-		-		-	2032 (1)
Mizoram	1	ZPM	1	-		-		ZPM	1	-	2032 (1)
Nagaland	1	BJP	1	BJP	1	-		-		-	2028 (1)
Odisha	10	BJD	5	BJP	5	-		BJD	5	-	2028 (3); 2030 (3); 2032 (4)
Puducherry	1	BJP	1	BJP	1	-		-		-	2027 (1)
Punjab	7	BJP	6	BJP	6	-		AAP	1	-	2028 (7)
Rajasthan	10	BJP	5	BJP	5	INC	5	-		-	2028 (4); 2030 (3); 2032 (3)
Sikkim	1	BJP	1	BJP	1	-		-		-	2030 (1)
Tamil Nadu	18	DMK	8	AIADMK	4	INC	3	DMK	8	-	2028 (6); 2031 (6); 2032 (6)
Tamil Nadu	18	DMK	8	PMK	1			DMDK	1	-	2028 (6); 2031 (6); 2032 (6)
Tamil Nadu	18	DMK	8	-				MNM	1	-	2028 (6); 2031 (6); 2032 (6)
Telangana	7	INC	4	-		INC	4	BRS	3	-	2028 (2); 2030 (3); 2032 (2)
Tripura	1	BJP	1	BJP	1	-		-		-	2028 (1)
Uttar Pradesh	31	BJP	24	BJP	24	SP	4	BSP	1	-	2026 (10); 2028 (11); 2030 (10)
Uttar Pradesh	31	BJP	24	RLD	1	IND	1	BSP	1	-	2026 (10); 2028 (11); 2030 (10)
Uttarakhand	3	BJP	3	BJP	3	-		-		-	2026 (1); 2028 (1); 2030 (1)
West Bengal	16	MAITC	9	BJP	7	MAITC	9	-			2029 (6); 2030 (5); 2032 (5)
Presidential nominees	12	BJP	5	BJP	5	-		-		-	2028 (5); 2030 (2); 2031 (4); 2032 (1)
Presidential nominees	12	BJP	5	NOM	7	-		-		-	2028 (5); 2030 (2); 2031 (4); 2032 (1)
Total	245	BJP	118	153		63		29		0	2026 (13); 2027 (4); 2028 (75) (Note: Including 5 nominated seats.); 2029 (10); 2030 (67) (Note: Including 2 nominated seats.); 2031 (16) (Note: Including 4 nominated seats.); 2032 (60) (Note: Including 1 nominated seat.)

== Officers of the House ==
=== Chairman ===
The chairman is the presiding officer of the Rajya Sabha and is ex-officio the Vice President of India. As of October 2025, the Chairman of the Rajya Sabha is C. P. Radhakrishnan, who is also the Vice President of India. He assumed office on September 12, 2025.

=== Deputy Chairman ===
The deputy chairman is elected by the Rajya Sabha from among its members and acts as the presiding officer in the absence of the chairman. Harivansh Narayan Singh is the current deputy chairman, and having been elected for a third term on 17 April 2026.

=== Leader of the House ===
Besides the chairman (vice-president of India) and the deputy chairman, there is also a position called leader of the House. This is a cabinet minister – the prime minister if they are a member of the House or another nominated minister. The leader has a seat next to the chairman, in the front row.

=== Leader of the Opposition ===
Besides the leader of the House, who is the government's chief representative in the House, there is also a leader of the opposition (LOP) – leading the opposition parties. The function was only recognized in the Salary and Allowances of Leaders of the Opposition in Parliament Act, 1977. This is commonly the leader of the largest non-government party and is recognized as such by the chairman.

=== Panel of Vice-chairpersons ===
A group of members nominated by the chairman to preside over the sessions of the Rajya Sabha in the absence of both the chairman and deputy chairman.

Members of the Panel of Vice-chairpersons (since 15 April 2026)
Sl.no	Chairperson name	Party	State	Appointed by
1.	Dinesh Sharma	BJP	Uttar Pradesh	C. P. Radhakrishnan
2.	S. Phangnon Konyak	BJP	Nagaland	C. P. Radhakrishnan
3.	Ghanshyam Tiwari	BJP	Rajasthan	C. P. Radhakrishnan
4.	Phulo Devi Netam	INC	Chhattisgarh	C. P. Radhakrishnan
5.	M. Thambi Durai	AIADMK	Tamil Nadu	C. P. Radhakrishnan
6.	Sasmit Patra	BJD	Odisha	C. P. Radhakrishnan

=== Secretary General ===
The Secretary General is the principal executive officer of the Rajya Sabha Secretariat and serves as the chief advisor to the Chairman of the Rajya Sabha on parliamentary matters. Pramod Chandra Mody serves as the Secretary General since November 2021.

== Secretariat ==
The Secretariat of the Rajya Sabha was set up under the provisions contained in Article 98 of the Constitution. The article, which provides for a separate secretarial staff for each house of Parliament, reads as follows:

98. Secretariat of Parliament – Each House of Parliament shall have a separate secretarial staff: Provided that nothing in this clause shall be construed as preventing the creation of posts common to both Houses of Parliament. (2) Parliament may by law regulate the recruitment and the conditions of service of persons appointed to the secretarial staff of either House of Parliament.

The Rajya Sabha Secretariat functions under the overall guidance and control of the chairman. The main activities of the Secretariat among other things include the following:

(i) providing secretarial assistance and support to the effective functioning of the Council of States (Rajya Sabha); (ii) providing amenities as admissible to Members of Rajya Sabha; (iii) servicing the various Parliamentary Committees; (iv) preparing research and reference material and bringing out various publications; (v) recruitment of manpower in the Sabha Secretariat and attending to personnel matters; and (vi) preparing and publishing a record of the day-to-day proceedings of the Rajya Sabha and bringing out such other publications, as may be required concerning the functioning of the Rajya Sabha and its Committees.

In the discharge of their constitutional and statutory responsibilities, the chairman of the Rajya Sabha is assisted by the secretary-general, who holds the rank equivalent to the cabinet secretary to the government of India. The secretary-general, in turn, is assisted by senior functionaries at the level of secretary, additional secretary, joint secretary and other officers and staff of the secretariat. The present secretary-general is Pramod Chandra Mody. In the winter 2019 session, uniforms of Rajya Sabha marshals were restyled from traditional Indian attire comprising turbans to dark navy blue and olive green military-style outfits with caps.

== Media ==
Sansad TV (STV) is a 24-hour parliamentary television channel owned and operated jointly by both houses of Indian Parliament. The channel aims to provide in-depth coverage and analysis of parliamentary affairs, especially its functioning and policy development. During sessions, Sansad TV provides live coverage and presents an analysis of the proceedings of the house as well as other day-to-day parliamentary events and developments.

Earlier, both houses of parliament had their own channels named Rajya Sabha TV and Lok Sabha TV respectively.

== See also ==
- Lok Sabha
- List of Rajya Sabha elections
- List of current members of the Rajya Sabha
- State legislative councils of India
- Secretary General of the Rajya Sabha
- Senate
