= List of Rajya Sabha members from Karnataka =

The Rajya Sabha is the upper house of the Parliament of India. Karnataka elects 12 seats and they are indirectly elected by the state legislators of Karnataka. The number of seats allocated to the party are determined by the number of seats a party possesses during nomination, and the party nominates a member to be voted on. Elections within the state legislatures are held using Single transferable vote with proportional representation.

== Incumbent Members of Parliament ==
Keys: INC (7) BJP (5)

#	Name	Party	Term start	Term End
1	Mallikarjun Kharge	INC	26-Jun-2026	25-Jun-2032
2	Mansoor Ali Khan	INC	26-Jun-2026	25-Jun-2032
3	Pawan Khera	INC	26-Jun-2026	25-Jun-2032
4	Syed Naseer Hussain	INC	03-Apr-2024	03-Apr-2030
5	Ajay Maken	INC	03-Apr-2024	03-Apr-2030
6	G. C. Chandrasekhar	INC	03-Apr-2024	03-Apr-2030
7	Jairam Ramesh	INC	01-Jul-2022	30-Jun-2028
8	M. Nagaraja	BJP	26-Jun-2026	25-Jun-2032
9	Narayana Bhandage	BJP	03-Apr-2024	03-Apr-2030
10	Nirmala Sitharaman	BJP	01-Jul-2022	30-Jun-2028
11	Lehar Singh Siroya	BJP	01-Jul-2022	30-Jun-2028
12	Jaggesh	BJP	01-Jul-2022	30-Jun-2028

== Chronological List of all Rajya Sabha members ==
This is the term wise list of former Rajya Sabha members from Karnataka, arranged chronologically by Last date of election of the member.

=== Karnataka ===
Name	Party	Term start	Term end	Term(s)	Notes
Mallikarjun Kharge	INC	26-Jun-2026	25-Jun-2032	2	
Mansoor Ali Khan	INC	26-Jun-2026	25-Jun-2032	1	
Pawan Khera	INC	26-Jun-2026	25-Jun-2032	1	
M. Nagaraja	BJP	26-Jun-2026	25-Jun-2032	1	
Syed Naseer Hussain	INC	03-Apr-2024	03-Apr-2030	2	
Ajay Maken	INC	03-Apr-2024	03-Apr-2030	1	
G. C. Chandrasekhar	INC	03-Apr-2024	03-Apr-2030	2	
Narayana Bhandage	BJP	03-Apr-2024	03-Apr-2030	1	
Nirmala Sitharaman	BJP	01-Jul-2022	30-Jun-2028	2	
Lehar Singh Siroya	BJP	01-Jul-2022	30-Jun-2028	1	
Jaggesh	BJP	01-Jul-2022	30-Jun-2028	1	
Jairam Ramesh	INC	01-Jul-2022	30-Jun-2028	2	
K. Narayan	BJP	26-Nov-2020	25-Jun-2026	1	bye - death of Ashok Gasti
Ashok Gasti	BJP	26-Jun-2020	17-Sep-2020	1	death
Eranna Kadadi	BJP	26-Jun-2020	25-Jun-2026	1	
Mallikarjun Kharge	INC	26-Jun-2020	25-Jun-2026	1	
H. D. Deve Gowda	JDS	26-Jun-2020	25-Jun-2026	2	
K. C. Ramamurthy	BJP	05-Dec-2019	30-Jun-2022	2	bye - resignation by himself
Syed Naseer Hussain	INC	03-Apr-2018	02-Apr-2024	1	
L. Hanumanthaiah	INC	03-Apr-2018	02-Apr-2024	1	
G. C. Chandrashekhar	INC	03-Apr-2018	02-Apr-2024	1	
Rajeev Chandrasekhar	BJP	03-Apr-2018	02-Apr-2024	3	
Oscar Fernandes	INC	01-Jul-2016	13-Sep-2021	4	death
Jairam Ramesh	INC	01-Jul-2016	30-Jun-2022	1	
K. C. Ramamurthy	INC	01-Jul-2016	16-Oct-2019	1	resigned
Nirmala Sitharaman	BJP	01-Jul-2016	30-Jun-2022	1	
B. K. Hariprasad	INC	26-Jun-2014	25-Jun-2020	4	
Rajeev Gowda	INC	26-Jun-2014	25-Jun-2020	1	
Prabhakar Kore	BJP	26-Jun-2014	25-Jun-2020	3	
D. Kupendra Reddy	JDS	26-Jun-2014	25-Jun-2020	1	
B. K. Hariprasad	INC	22-Aug-2013	25-Jun-2014	3	bye - resignation of Anil Lad
R. Ramakrishna	BJP	03-Apr-2012	02-Apr-2018	1	
Basavaraj Patil Sedam	BJP	03-Apr-2012	02-Apr-2018	1	
Rajeev Chandrasekhar	Ind	03-Apr-2012	11-Mar-2018	2	resigned
K. Rahman Khan	INC	03-Apr-2012	02-Apr-2018	4	
Hema Malini	BJP	04-Mar-2011	03-Apr-2012	1	bye - death of M. Rajasekara Murthy
Venkaiah Naidu	BJP	01-Jul-2010	30-Jun-2016	3	
Ayanur Manjunath	BJP	01-Jul-2010	30-Jun-2016	1	
Vijay Mallya	Ind	01-Jul-2010	04-May-2016	2	resigned
Oscar Fernandes	INC	01-Jul-2010	30-Jun-2016	3	
Rama Jois	BJP	26-Jun-2008	25-Jun-2014	1	
Prabhakar Kore	BJP	26-Jun-2008	25-Jun-2014	2	
S. M. Krishna	INC	26-Jun-2008	25-Jun-2014	2	
Anil Lad	INC	26-Jun-2008	20-May-2013	1	elected to Bellary City Assembly
K. B. Shanappa	BJP	03-Apr-2006	02-Apr-2012	1	
M. Rajasekara Murthy	JDS	03-Apr-2006	05-Dec-2010	3	death
K. Rahman Khan	INC	03-Apr-2006	02-Apr-2012	3	
Rajeev Chandrasekhar	Ind	03-Apr-2006	02-Apr-2012	1	
B. K. Hariprasad	INC	01-Jul-2004	30-Jun-2010	2	
Oscar Fernandes	INC	01-Jul-2004	30-Jun-2010	2	
Venkaiah Naidu	BJP	01-Jul-2004	30-Jun-2010	2	
M. A. M. Ramaswamy	JDS	01-Jul-2004	30-Jun-2010	1	
M. V. Rajasekharan	INC	10-Apr-2002	09-Apr-2008	1	
Janardhana Poojary	INC	10-Apr-2002	09-Apr-2008	2	
Prema Cariappa	INC	10-Apr-2002	09-Apr-2008	1	
Vijay Mallya	Ind	10-Apr-2002	09-Apr-2008	1	
K. Rahman Khan	INC	03-Apr-2000	02-Apr-2006	2	
K. B. Krishna Murthy	INC	03-Apr-2000	02-Apr-2006	1	
Bimba Raikar	INC	03-Apr-2000	02-Apr-2006	1	
M. Rajasekara Murthy	BJP	03-Apr-2000	10-Nov-2005	2	resigned
K. C. Kondaiah	INC	14-Jan-2000	09-Apr-2002	1	bye - resignation of S. M. Krishna
A. Lakshmisagar	JD	13-Apr-1998	09-Apr-2002	1	bye - resignation of H. D. Deve Gowda
H. K. Javare Gowda	JD	03-Apr-1998	02-Apr-2004	1	
S. R. Bommai	JD	03-Apr-1998	02-Apr-2004	1	
Venkaiah Naidu	BJP	03-Apr-1998	02-Apr-2004	1	
Oscar Fernandes	INC	03-Apr-1998	02-Apr-2004	1	
H. D. Deve Gowda	JD	23-Sep-1996	02-Mar-1998	1	bye - resignation of Leeladevi Renuka Prasad elected to Hassan Lok Sabha constituency
Ramakrishna Hegde	JD	10-Apr-1996	09-Apr-2002	2	
C. M. Ibrahim	JD	10-Apr-1996	09-Apr-2002	1	
Leeladevi R Prasad	JD	10-Apr-1996	22-Apr-1996	1	resigned
S. M. Krishna	INC	10-Apr-1996	14-Oct-1999	1	sworn in as Chief minister of Karnataka
H. Hanumanthappa	INC	03-Apr-1994	02-Apr-2000	3	
M. Rajasekara Murthy	INC	03-Apr-1994	23-Aug-1999	1	resigned
Janardhana Poojary	INC	03-Apr-1994	02-Apr-2000	1	
K. Rahman Khan	INC	03-Apr-1994	02-Apr-2000	1	
Margaret Alva	INC	03-Apr-1992	02-Apr-1998	4	
K. R. Jayadevappa	INC	03-Apr-1992	02-Apr-1998	1	
Gundappa Korwar	INC	03-Apr-1992	02-Apr-1998	1	
Satchidananda	INC	03-Apr-1992	02-Apr-1998	3	
Satchidananda	INC	04-Sep-1991	02-Apr-1992	2	bye - resignation of Taradevi Siddhartha
B. K. Hariprasad	INC	10-Apr-1990	09-Apr-1996	1	
Prabhakar Kore	INC	10-Apr-1990	09-Apr-1996	1	
G. Y. Krishnan	INC	10-Apr-1990	09-Apr-1996	1	
I. G. Sanadi	INC	10-Apr-1990	09-Apr-1996	1	
Taradevi Siddhartha	INC	26-Mar-1990	16-Jun-1991	1	bye - resignation of D. B. Chandregowda elected to Chikmagalur Lok Sabha
J.P. Javali	JP	03-Apr-1988	02-Apr-1994	1	
Ram Jethmalani	JP	03-Apr-1988	02-Apr-1994	1	
Abdul Samad Siddiqui	JP	03-Apr-1988	02-Apr-1994	1	
H. Hanumanthappa	INC	03-Apr-1988	02-Apr-1994	2	
D. B. Chandregowda	JP	03-Apr-1986	14-Dec-1989	1	elected to Tirthahalli Assembly
K. G. Maheswarappa	JP	03-Apr-1986	02-Apr-1992	1	
R. S. Naik	JP	03-Apr-1986	02-Apr-1992	1	
Margaret Alva	INC	03-Apr-1986	02-Apr-1992	3	
K. G. Thimme Gowda	JP	10-Apr-1984	09-Apr-1990	1	
M. S. Gurupadaswamy	JP	10-Apr-1984	09-Apr-1990	3	
Sarojini Mahishi	JP	10-Apr-1984	09-Apr-1990	2	
Kollur Mallappa	INC	10-Apr-1984	09-Apr-1990	3	
Sarojini Mahishi	JP	08-Sep-1983	09-Apr-1984	1	bye - resignation of Ramakrishna Hegde
H. Hanumanthappa	INC	03-Apr-1982	02-Apr-1988	1	
F. M. Khan	INC	03-Apr-1982	02-Apr-1988	2	
Veershetty Moglappa Kushnoor	INC	03-Apr-1982	02-Apr-1988	1	
M. Rajagopal	INC	03-Apr-1982	02-Apr-1988	1	
Margaret Alva	INC	03-Apr-1980	02-Apr-1986	2	
M. Basavaraju	INC	03-Apr-1980	02-Apr-1986	1	
Monika Das	INC	03-Apr-1980	02-Apr-1986	1	
M. Maddanna	INC	03-Apr-1980	02-Apr-1986	1	
B. Ibrahim	INC	25-Mar-1980	09-Apr-1984		bye - resignation of H. R. Basavaraj
H. R. Basavaraj	INC	10-Apr-1978	17-Jan-1980	1	resigned
Maqsood Ali Khan	INC	10-Apr-1978	09-Apr-1984	2	
Satchidananda	INC	10-Apr-1978	09-Apr-1984	1	
Ramakrishna Hegde	JP	10-Apr-1978	23-May-1983	1	sworn in as Chief minister of Karnataka
L. R. Naik	INC	20-Jul-1977	02-Apr-1980	1	bye - resignation of B. Rachaiah
T. V. Chandrasekharappa	INC	13-Jul-1977	09-Apr-1978	1	bye - resignation of T. A. Pai
L. G. Havanur	INC	13-Jul-1977	09-Apr-1978	1	bye - death of H. S. Narasiah
R. M. Desai	INC	03-Apr-1976	02-Apr-1982	1	
F. M. Khan	INC	03-Apr-1976	02-Apr-1982	1	
Mulka Govinda Reddy	INC	03-Apr-1976	02-Apr-1982	4	
K.S. Malle Gowda	Ind	03-Apr-1976	02-Apr-1982	2	
Margaret Alva	INC	03-Apr-1974	02-Apr-1980	1	
Kollur Mallappa	INC	03-Apr-1974	02-Apr-1980	2	
B. Rachaiah	INC	03-Apr-1974	21-Mar-1977	1	elected to Chamarajanagar Lok Sabha
U. K. Lakshmana Gowda	Ind	03-Apr-1974	02-Apr-1980	2	

=== Mysore state ===
Name	Party	Term start	Term end	Term(s)	Notes
Maqsood Ali Khan	INC	10-Apr-1972	09-Apr-1978	1	
H. S. Narasiah	INC	10-Apr-1972	15-May-1977	1	death
T. A. Pai	INC	10-Apr-1972	21-Mar-1977	1	elected to Udupi Lok Sabha
Veerendra Patil	INC(O)	10-Apr-1972	09-Apr-1978	1	
K. Nagappa Alva	INC(O)	03-Apr-1970	02-Apr-1976	1	
B. P. Nagaraja Murthy	INC	03-Apr-1970	02-Apr-1976	1	
Mulka Govinda Reddy	INC	03-Apr-1970	02-Apr-1976	3	
K. S. Malle Gowda	Ind	03-Apr-1970	02-Apr-1976	1	
M. Sherkhan	INC	30-Mar-1970	02-Apr-1972	3	bye - death of Violet Alva
B. T. Kemparaj	INC	03-Apr-1968	02-Apr-1974	1	
Kollur Mallappa	INC	03-Apr-1968	02-Apr-1974	1	
Patil Puttappa	INC	03-Apr-1968	02-Apr-1974	2	
U. K. Lakshmana Gowda	Ind	03-Apr-1968	02-Apr-1974	1	
T. Siddalingayya	INC	03-May-1967	02-Apr-1970	1	bye - resignation of C. M. Poonacha
Violet Alva	INC	03-Apr-1966	20-Nov-1969	2	death
M. S. Gurupadaswamy	INC	03-Apr-1966	02-Apr-1972	2	
N. Sri Rama Reddy	INC	03-Apr-1966	02-Apr-1972	2	
M. D. Narayan	Ind	03-Apr-1966	02-Apr-1972	1	
C. M. Poonacha	INC	03-Apr-1964	25-Feb-1967	1	elected to Mangalore Lok Sabha
M. Sherkhan	INC	03-Apr-1964	02-Apr-1970	2	
Annapurna Devi Thimmareddy	INC	03-Apr-1964	02-Apr-1970	2	
Mulka Govinda Reddy	Ind	03-Apr-1964	02-Apr-1970	2	
D. P. Karmarkar	INC	03-Apr-1962	02-Apr-1968	1	
M. Govind Reddy	INC	03-Apr-1962	02-Apr-1968	3	
J Venkatappa	PSP	03-Apr-1962	02-Apr-1968	1	
Patil Puttappa	INC	03-Apr-1962	02-Apr-1968	1	
M. Sherkhan	INC	09-Mar-1961	02-Apr-1964	2	bye - death of M Valiulla
Violet Alva	INC	03-Apr-1960	02-Apr-1966	1	
M. S. Gurupadaswamy	INC	03-Apr-1960	02-Apr-1966	1	
N. Sri Rama Reddy	INC	03-Apr-1960	02-Apr-1966	1	
B.C. Nanjundaiya	INC	03-Apr-1960	02-Apr-1966	2	
B. P. Basappa Shetty	INC	03-Apr-1958	02-Apr-1964	2	
Annapurna Devi Thimmareddy	INC	03-Apr-1958	02-Apr-1964	1	
M Valiulla	INC	03-Apr-1958	17-Dec-1960	2	death
Mulka Govinda Reddy	PSP	03-Apr-1958	02-Apr-1964	1	
B.C. Nanjundaiya	INC	25-Apr-1957	02-Apr-1960	1	bye - resignation of H. C. Dasappa
B. Shiva Rao	INC	25-Apr-1957	02-Apr-1960	1	bye - resignation of K. Chengalaraya Reddy
M. Govind Reddy	INC	03-Apr-1956	02-Apr-1962	2	
N. S. Hardikar	INC	03-Apr-1956	02-Apr-1962	2	
Janardhan Rao Desai	INC	03-Apr-1956	02-Apr-1962	1	
S. V. Krishnamoorthy Rao	INC	03-Apr-1956	01-Mar-1962	2	elected to Shimoga Lok Sabha
Raghavendra Rao	INC	03-Apr-1954	02-Apr-1960	1	
H. C. Dasappa	INC	03-Apr-1954	13-Mar-1957	1	elected to Bangalore Lok Sabha
K. Chengalaraya Reddy	INC	03-Apr-1954	18-Mar-1957	2	elected to Kolar Lok Sabha
K. Chengalaraya Reddy	INC	09-Oct-1952	02-Apr-1954	1	bye - death of L. H. Thimmabovi
N. S. Hardikar	INC	07-Aug-1952	02-Apr-1956	1	
Lalchand Hirachand	INC	03-Apr-1952	02-Apr-1958	1	
B. P. Basappa Shetty	INC	03-Apr-1952	02-Apr-1958	1	
M Valiulla	INC	03-Apr-1952	02-Apr-1958	1	
S. V. Krishnamoorthy Rao	INC	03-Apr-1952	02-Apr-1956	1	
M. Govind Reddy	INC	03-Apr-1952	02-Apr-1956	1	
L. H. Thimmabovi	INC	03-Apr-1952	24-Aug-1952	1	death
C. Gopala Krishnamoorthy Reddy	SOC	03-Apr-1952	02-Apr-1954	1	
