= 2020 Rajya Sabha elections =

Elections for the upper house of Indian Parliament

- April – December 2020

78 (Note: Including 6 casual vacancies) of the 233 (Note: excluding 12 nominated seats) elected seats in the Rajya Sabha 122 (Note: out of 242 (excluding 3 vacancies and including 12 nominated seats)) total seats needed for a majority
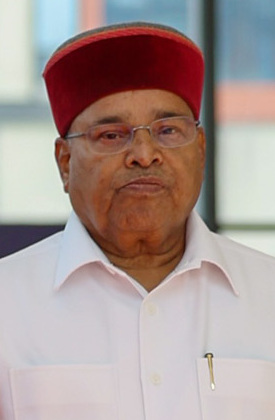

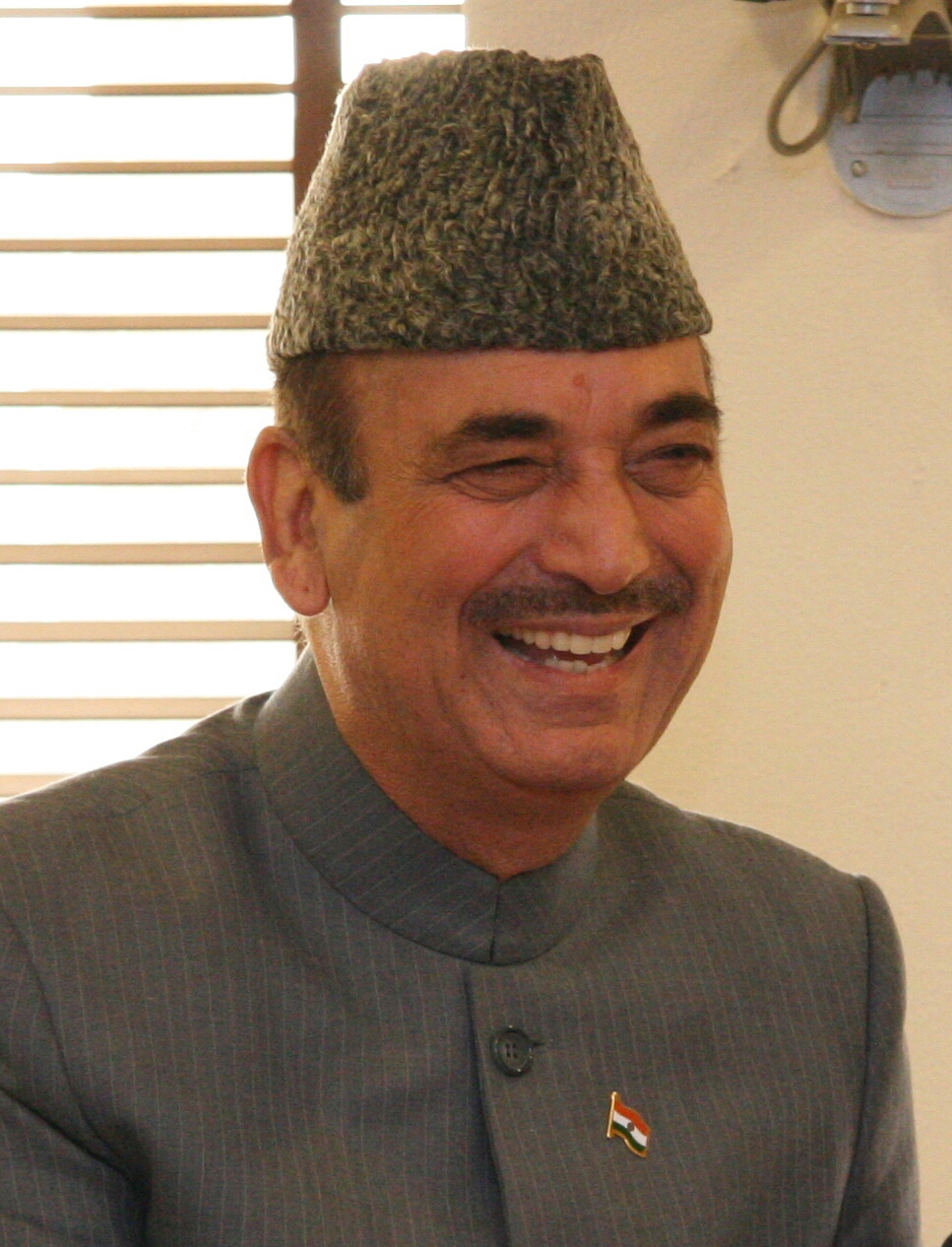
| | First party | Second party |
|---|---|---|
| Leader | Thawar Chand Gehlot | Ghulam Nabi Azad |
| Party | BJP | INC |
| Alliance | NDA | UPA |
| Leader since | 11 June 2019 | 8 June 2014 |
| Seats before | 75 (Note: excluding 8 nominated members) | 44 |
| Seats after | 85 (Note: excluding 8 nominated members and one vacancy) | 36 |
| Seat change | ▲10 | ▼8 |
| Alliance seats before | 99 (Note: excluding 11 nominated members) | 62 (Note: excluding 1 nominated member) |
| Alliance seats after | 107 (Note: excluding 12 nominated members) | 59 |
| Seat change | ▲8 | ▼3 |
Majority before election
None
Majority after election
None

2020 Rajya Sabha elections were the set of indirect elections by the members of State legislatures of India, to elect new members to fill vacancies in the Rajya Sabha – the upper house of the Parliament of India. The elections are held annually and throughout the year on an ad hoc basis. The elections in 2020 are for a total of 72 seats of which 55 of them were to be elected by March 26. The remaining were postponed due to the COVID-19 pandemic. The Election Commission of India later announced all the elections for the remaining 24 Rajya Sabha seats were to be held on 19 June 2020.

On 12 June 2020, Election commission of India declared unopposed victory over 4 seats of Karnataka and 1 seat of Arunachal Pradesh. Leaving behind 19 seats to go for elections on 19 June 2020.

On 2 November 2020, Election commission of India declared unopposed victory over 10 seats of Uttar Pradesh and 1 seat of Uttarakhand.

== Results ==
| Alliance/ Party | | | Seats | +/– | | | |
|---|---|---|---|---|---|---|---|
| Alliance/ Party | | | | NDA | Bharatiya Janata Party | 30 (Note: excluding one vacancy) | +10 |
| All India Anna Dravida Munnetra Kazhagam | 2 | -2 | | NDA | | | |
| Janata Dal (United) | 2 | -1 | | NDA | | | |
| Bodoland People's Front | 1 | 0 | | NDA | | | |
| Mizo National Front | 1 | +1 | | NDA | | | |
| National People's Party | 1 | +1 | | NDA | | | |
| Republican Party of India (Athawale) | 1 | 0 | | NDA | | | |
| Tamil Maanila Congress (Moopanar) | 1 | +1 | | NDA | | | |
| Independent (Sanjay Kakade) | 0 | -1 | | NDA | | | |
| Independent (Parimal Nathwani) | 0 | -1 | | NDA | | | |
| Total | 39 | +8 | | NDA | | | |
| UPA | | Indian National Congress | 9 | -8 | | | |
| UPA | | Dravida Munnetra Kazhagam | 3 | +1 | | | |
| UPA | | Nationalist Congress Party | 2 | 0 | | | |
| UPA | | Rashtriya Janata Dal | 2 | +2 | | | |
| UPA | | Jharkhand Mukti Morcha | 1 | +1 | | | |
| UPA | | Independent (Ajit Kumar Bhuyan) | 1 | +1 | | | |
| UPA | Total | | 18 | -3 | | | |
| Others | | All India Trinamool Congress | 4 | 0 | | | |
| Others | | Biju Janata Dal | 4 | 0 | | | |
| Others | | Yuvajana Sramika Rythu Congress Party | 4 | +4 | | | |
| Others | | Telangana Rashtra Samithi | 2 | +2 | | | |
| Others | | Bahujan Samaj Party | 1 | -1 | | | |
| Others | | Communist Party of India (Marxist) | 1 | -1 | | | |
| Others | | Janata Dal (Secular) | 1 | -2 | | | |
| Others | | Loktantrik Janata Dal | 1 | -2 | | | |
| Others | | Samajwadi Party | 1 | -2 | | | |
| Others | | Shiv Sena | 1 | 0 | | | |

== Members retiring & Elected ==
=== April Election ===
==== Maharashtra ====
| # | Previous MP | Party | Term end | Elected MP | Party |
|---|---|---|---|---|---|
| 1 | Sharad Pawar | NCP | 02-Apr-2020 | Sharad Pawar | NCP |
| 2 | Majeed Memon | NCP | 02-Apr-2020 | Fouzia Khan | NCP |
| 3 | Husain Dalwai | INC | 02-Apr-2020 | Rajiv Satav | INC |
| 4 | Rajkumar Dhoot | SS | 02-Apr-2020 | Priyanka Chaturvedi | SS |
| 5 | Ramdas Athawale | RPI(A) | 02-Apr-2020 | Ramdas Athawale | RPI(A) |
| 6 | Amar Shankar Sable | BJP | 02-Apr-2020 | Udayanraje Bhosale | BJP |
| 7 | Sanjay Kakade | IND | 02-Apr-2020 | Bhagwat Karad | BJP |

==== Odisha ====
| # | Previous MP | Party | Term end | Elected MP | Party |
|---|---|---|---|---|---|
| 1 | Ranjib Biswal | INC | 02-Apr-2020 | Subhash Chandra Singh | BJD |
| 2 | Narendra Kumar Swain | BJD | 02-Apr-2020 | Munna Khan | BJD |
| 3 | Sarojini Hembram | BJD | 02-Apr-2020 | Sujeet Kumar | BJD |
| 4 | Vacant (Anubhav Mohanty) | | | Mamata Mohanta | BJD |

==== Tamil Nadu ====
| # | Previous MP | Party | Term end | Elected MP | Party |
|---|---|---|---|---|---|
| 1 | Sasikala Pushpa | AIADMK | 02-Apr-2020 | M. Thambidurai | AIADMK |
| 2 | Vijila Sathyananth | AIADMK | 02-Apr-2020 | K. P. Munusamy | AIADMK |
| 3 | S. Muthukaruppan | AIADMK | 02-Apr-2020 | G. K. Vasan | TMC |
| 4 | K. Selvaraj | AIADMK | 02-Apr-2020 | Anthiyur P. Selvaraj | DMK |
| 5 | Tiruchi Siva | DMK | 02-Apr-2020 | Tiruchi Siva | DMK |
| 6 | T. K. Rangarajan | CPI(M) | 02-Apr-2020 | N. R. Elango | DMK |

==== West Bengal ====
| # | Previous MP | Party | Term end | Elected MP | Party |
|---|---|---|---|---|---|
| 1 | Ahmed Hassan Imran | AITC | 02-Apr-2020 | Dinesh Trivedi | AITC |
| 2 | Kanwar Deep Singh | AITC | 02-Apr-2020 | Arpita Ghosh | AITC |
| 3 | Jogen Chowdhury | AITC | 02-Apr-2020 | Mausam Noor | AITC |
| 4 | Manish Gupta | AITC | 02-Apr-2020 | Subrata Bakshi | AITC |
| 5 | Ritabrata Banerjee | IND | 02-Apr-2020 | Bikash Ranjan Bhattacharya | CPI(M) |

==== Andhra Pradesh ====
| # | Previous MP | Party | Term end | Elected MP | Party |
|---|---|---|---|---|---|
| 1 | T. Subbarami Reddy | INC | 09-Apr-2020 | Alla Ayodhya Rami Reddy | YSRCP |
| 2 | Mohd. Ali Khan | INC | 09-Apr-2020 | Pilli Subhash Chandra Bose | YSRCP |
| 3 | Thota Seetharama Lakshmi | TDP | 09-Apr-2020 | Mopidevi Venkataramana | YSRCP |
| 4 | K. Keshava Rao | TRS | 09-Apr-2020 | Parimal Nathwani | YSRCP |

==== Assam ====
| # | Previous MP | Party | Term end | Elected MP | Party |
|---|---|---|---|---|---|
| 1 | Biswajit Daimary | BPF | 09-Apr-2020 | Biswajit Daimary | BPF |
| 2 | Vacant (Bhubaneshwar Kalita) | | | Bhubaneshwar Kalita | BJP |
| 3 | Vacant (Sanjaya Sinh) | | | Ajit Kumar Bhuyan | IND |

==== Bihar ====
| # | Previous MP | Party | Term end | Elected MP | Party |
|---|---|---|---|---|---|
| 1 | Harivansh Narayan Singh | JD(U) | 09-Apr-2020 | Harivansh Narayan Singh | JD(U) |
| 2 | Ram Nath Thakur | JD(U) | 09-Apr-2020 | Ram Nath Thakur | JD(U) |
| 3 | Kahkashan Perween | JD(U) | 09-Apr-2020 | Prem Chand Gupta | RJD |
| 4 | Ravindra Kishore Sinha | BJP | 09-Apr-2020 | Amarendra Dhari Singh | RJD |
| 5 | C. P. Thakur | BJP | 09-Apr-2020 | Vivek Thakur | BJP |

==== Chhattisgarh ====
| # | Previous MP | Party | Term end | Elected MP | Party |
|---|---|---|---|---|---|
| 1 | Ranvijay Singh Judev | BJP | 09-Apr-2020 | K. T. S. Tulsi | INC |
| 2 | Motilal Vora | INC | 09-Apr-2020 | Phulo Devi Netam | INC |

==== Gujarat ====
| # | Previous MP | Party | Term end | Elected MP | Party |
|---|---|---|---|---|---|
| 1 | Chunibhai K Gohel | BJP | 09-Apr-2020 | Abhay Bhardwaj | BJP |
| 2 | Shambhuprasad Tundiya | BJP | 09-Apr-2020 | Ramilaben Bara | BJP |
| 3 | Lal Sinh Vadodia | BJP | 09-Apr-2020 | Narhari Amin | BJP |
| 4 | Madhusudan Mistry | INC | 09-Apr-2020 | Shaktisinh Gohil | INC |

==== Haryana ====
| # | Previous MP | Party | Term end | Elected MP | Party |
|---|---|---|---|---|---|
| 1 | Selja Kumari | INC | 09-Apr-2020 | Deepender Singh Hooda | INC |
| 2 | Vacant (Ram Kumar Kashyap) | | | Ram Chander Jangra | BJP |

==== Himachal Pradesh ====
| # | Previous MP | Party | Term end | Elected MP | Party |
|---|---|---|---|---|---|
| 1 | Viplove Thakur | INC | 09-Apr-2020 | Indu Goswami | BJP |

==== Jharkhand ====
| # | Previous MP | Party | Term end | Elected MP | Party |
|---|---|---|---|---|---|
| 1 | Prem Chand Gupta | RJD | 09-Apr-2020 | Shibu Soren | JMM |
| 2 | Parimal Nathwani | IND | 09-Apr-2020 | Deepak Prakash | BJP |

==== Madhya Pradesh ====
| # | Previous MP | Party | Term end | Elected MP | Party |
|---|---|---|---|---|---|
| 1 | Satyanarayan Jatiya | BJP | 09-Apr-2020 | Jyotiraditya Scindia | BJP |
| 2 | Prabhat Jha | BJP | 09-Apr-2020 | Sumer Singh Solanki | BJP |
| 3 | Digvijaya Singh | INC | 09-Apr-2020 | Digvijaya Singh | INC |

==== Manipur ====
| # | Previous MP | Party | Term end | Elected MP | Party |
|---|---|---|---|---|---|
| 1 | Bhabananda Singh | BJP | 09-Apr-2020 | Leishemba Sanajaoba | BJP |

==== Rajasthan ====
| # | Previous MP | Party | Term end | Elected MP | Party |
|---|---|---|---|---|---|
| 1 | Narayan Lal Panchariya | BJP | 09-Apr-2020 | Rajendra Gehlot | BJP |
| 2 | Ramnarayan Dudi | BJP | 09-Apr-2020 | K. C. Venugopal | INC |
| 3 | Vijay Goel | BJP | 09-Apr-2020 | Neeraj Dangi | INC |

==== Telangana ====
| # | Previous MP | Party | Term end | Elected MP | Party |
|---|---|---|---|---|---|
| 1 | Garikapati Mohan Rao | BJP | 09-Apr-2020 | K. Keshava Rao | BRS |
| 2 | K. V. P. Ramachandra Rao | INC | 09-Apr-2020 | K. R. Suresh Reddy | BRS |

==== Meghalaya ====
| # | Previous MP | Party | Term end | Elected MP | Party |
|---|---|---|---|---|---|
| 1 | Wansuk Syiem | INC | 12-Apr-2020 | Wanweiroy Kharlukhi | NPP |

=== June Election ===
==== Arunachal Pradesh ====
| # | Previous MP | Party | Term end | Elected MP | Party |
|---|---|---|---|---|---|
| 1 | Mukut Mithi | INC | 23-Jun-2020 | Nabam Rebia | BJP |

==== Karnataka ====
| # | Previous MP | Party | Term end | Elected MP | Party |
|---|---|---|---|---|---|
| 1 | Prabhakar Kore | BJP | 25-Jun-2020 | Ashok Gasti | BJP |
| 2 | B. K. Hariprasad | INC | 25-Jun-2020 | Eranna Kadadi | BJP |
| 3 | Rajeev Gowda | INC | 25-Jun-2020 | Mallikarjun Kharge | INC |
| 4 | D. Kupendra Reddy | JD(S) | 25-Jun-2020 | H. D. Deve Gowda | JD(S) |

==== Mizoram ====
| # | Previous MP | Party | Term end | Elected MP | Party |
|---|---|---|---|---|---|
| 1 | Ronald Sapa Tlau | INC | 18-Jul-2020 | K. Vanlalvena | MNF |

=== November Election ===
==== Uttar Pradesh ====
| # | Previous MP | Party | Term end | Elected MP | Party |
|---|---|---|---|---|---|
| 1 | Ram Gopal Yadav | SP | 25-Nov-2020 | Ram Gopal Yadav | SP |
| 2 | Ravi Prakash Verma | SP | 25-Nov-2020 | Seema Dwivedi | BJP |
| 3 | Chandrapal Singh Yadav | SP | 25-Nov-2020 | Hardwar Dubey | BJP |
| 4 | Javed Ali Khan | SP | 25-Nov-2020 | Brij Lal | BJP |
| 5 | Hardeep Singh Puri | BJP | 25-Nov-2020 | Hardeep Singh Puri | BJP |
| 6 | Arun Singh | BJP | 25-Nov-2020 | Arun Singh | BJP |
| 7 | Neeraj Shekhar | BJP | 25-Nov-2020 | Neeraj Shekhar | BJP |
| 8 | P. L. Punia | INC | 25-Nov-2020 | Geeta Shakya | BJP |
| 9 | Veer Singh | BSP | 25-Nov-2020 | B. L. Verma | BJP |
| 10 | Rajaram | BSP | 25-Nov-2020 | Ramji Gautam | BSP |

==== Uttarakhand ====
| # | Previous MP | Party | Term end | Elected MP | Party |
|---|---|---|---|---|---|
| 1 | Raj Babbar | INC | 25-Nov-2020 | Naresh Bansal | BJP |

=== By-elections ===
Aside from automatic elections, unforeseen vacancies caused by members' resignation, death or disqualification, are unless a few months before the expected natural expiry of the term of tenure, filled via by-elections, which for the Rajya Sabha often take some months to organise.

==== Haryana ====
- On 20 January 2020 Birender Singh Resigned from membership of the Rajya Sabha from Haryana

| # | Former MP | Party | Date of Vacancy | Elected MP | Party | Term start | Term end |
|---|---|---|---|---|---|---|---|
| 1 | Birender Singh | BJP | 20-Jan-2020 | Dushyant Kumar Gautam | BJP | 16-Mar-2020 | 01-Aug-2022 |

==== Bihar ====
- On 8 October 2020, Union Minister Ram Vilas Paswan died.

| # | Former MP | Party | Date of Vacancy | Elected MP | Party | Term start | Term end |
|---|---|---|---|---|---|---|---|
| 1 | Ram Vilas Paswan | LJP | 08-Oct-2020 | Sushil Kumar Modi | BJP | 07-Dec-2020 | 02-Apr-2024 |

==== Uttar Pradesh ====
- On 27 March 2020 Beni Prasad Verma died.
- On 1 August 2020 Amar Singh died.

| # | Former MP | Party | Date of Vacancy | Elected MP | Party | Term start | Term end |
|---|---|---|---|---|---|---|---|
| 1 | Beni Prasad Verma | SP | 27-Mar-2020 | Jai Prakash Nishad | BJP | 17-Aug-2020 | 04-Jul-2022 |
| 2 | Amar Singh | IND | 01-Aug-2020 | Syed Zafar Islam | BJP | 11-Sep-2020 | 04-Jul-2022 |

==== Kerala ====
- On 28 May 2020 Veerendra Kumar died.

| # | Former MP | Party | Date of Vacancy | Elected MP | Party | Term start | Term end |
|---|---|---|---|---|---|---|---|
| 1 | M. P. Veerendra Kumar | IND | 28-May-2020 | M. V. Shreyams Kumar | LJD | 24-Aug-2020 | 02-Apr-2022 |

==== Karnataka ====
- On 17 September 2020 Ashok Gasti died.

| # | Former MP | Party | Date of Vacancy | Elected MP | Party | Term start | Term end |
|---|---|---|---|---|---|---|---|
| 1 | Ashok Gasti | BJP | 17-Sep-2020 | K. Narayan | BJP | 24-Nov-2020 | 25-Jun-2026 |

== Nominations ==
Note:

- Listed According Date Of Retirement

=== Nominated ===
| # | Previous MP | Party | Term end | Nominated MP | Party | Term start | Reference |
|---|---|---|---|---|---|---|---|
| 1 | K. T. S. Tulsi | Nominated | 25-Feb-2020 | Ranjan Gogoi | Nominated | 16-Mar-2020 | |
