= 1958 Rajya Sabha elections =

Elections for the Upper House of Indian Parliament

Rajya Sabha elections, 1958
- 1958
Elected Rajya Sabha members for term 1958-1964
TBD

Rajya Sabha elections were held in 1958, to elect members of the Rajya Sabha, Indian Parliament's upper chamber.

== Elections ==
Elections were held in 1958 to elect members from various states. The list is incomplete.

=== Members elected ===
The following members are elected in the elections held in 1958. They are members for the term 1958-64 and retire in year 1964, except in case of the resignation or death before the term.

State - Member - Party

Rajya Sabha members for term 1958-1964
State	Member Name	Party	Remark
Andhra	A Chakradhar	OTH	R
Andhra	N Venkateshwara Rao	INC	
Andhra	M H Samuel	INC	
Andhra	Yudhvir Seeta	INC	
Assam	Joy Bhadra Hagjer	INC	res. 17/03/1962 3LS
Assam	Maulana M Tayyebulla	INC	
Bombay	Abid Ali	INC	
Bombay	Babubhai M Chinai	INC	
Bombay	Rohit M Dave	INC	
Bombay	Somnath P Dave	INC	Death 05/01/1959
Bombay	Bhaurao D Khobragade	RPI	
Bombay	Dahyabhai V Patel	INC	
Bombay	Sonusinh D Patil	INC	
Bombay	Lalji Moreshwar Pendse	CPI	
Bihar	Ahmed Hussain Kazi	INC	Dea. 29/07/1961
Bihar	Anand Chand	INC	
Bihar	Kamta Singh	OTH	
Bihar	Devendra Pratap Singh	OTH	
Bihar	Jahanara Jaipal Singh	INC	
Bihar	Awadeshwar Prasad Sinha	INC	
Bihar	Braj Kishore Prasad Sinha	INC	
Bihar	Rajeshwar Prasad Narain Sinha	INC	
Bihar	Rama Bahadur Sinha	INC	
Bihar	Sheel Bhadra Yajee	INC	
Delhi	Begum Siddiqa Kidwai	INC ( dea 03/06/1958 )	
Hyderabad	S Channa Reddy	INC	
Hyderabad	Narsing Rao	INC	
Jammu & Kashmir	Sardar Budh Singh	JKNC	
Jammu & Kashmir	Pir Mohhmed Khan	JKNC	
Madhya Pradesh	Tribak D Pustake	INC	Dea. 11/08/1960
Madhya Pradesh	Vishnu Vinayak Sarwate	INC	earlier fr Madhya Bharat
Madhya Pradesh	Ramrao Deshmukh	INC	
Madhya Pradesh	Dayaldas Kurre	INC	
Madhya Pradesh	Niranjan Singh	INC	
Madhya Pradesh	Dr Seeta Parmanand	INC	
Madras	T S A Chettiar	INC	
Madras	N M Lingam	INC	
Madras	K L Narsimham	CPI	
Madras	B Parmeswaran	OTH	res. 12/03/1962
Madras	G Rajagopalan	INC	
Madras	H D Rajah	RPI	dea. 30/11/1959
Mysore	Mulka Govinda Reddy	OTH	
Mysore	P B Basappa Shetty	INC	
Mysore	Annapurna Devi Thihmareddy	INC	
Mysore	M Valiulla	INC	dea. 17/12/1960
Nominated	Dr P V Kane	NOM	res 11/09/1959
Nominated	Maithili Sharan Gupt	NOM	
Nominated	Kaka Kalelkar	NOM	
Nominated	Dr A N Khosla	NOM	res 11/09/1959
Orissa	Bibudhendra Misra	INC	Res. 27/02/1962 ele 3LS
Orissa	Harihar Patel	OTH	Res. 28/06/1961
Orissa	Dibakar Patnaik	OTH	
Punjab	Jagan Nath Kaushal	INC	earlier fr. P E P S U
Punjab	Rajkumari Amrit Kaur	INC	dea 06/02/1964
Punjab	Darshan Singh Pheruman	INC	
Punjab	Madho Ram Sharma	INC	
Rajashtan	Keshvanand	INC	
Rajashtan	Tika Ram Paliwal	OTH	Res. 27/02/1962 ele 3LS
Kerala	K Udayabhau Bharti	INC	earlier fr Travancore & Cochin
Kerala	S. Chattanatha Karayalar	INC	
Kerala	Dr A Subba Rao	CPI	
Kerala	P A Soloman	CPI	
Uttar Pradesh	J P Agrawal	OTH	
Uttar Pradesh	F H Ansari	OTH	
Uttar Pradesh	Dr Z A Ahmad	CPI	res. 19/03/1962
Uttar Pradesh	Mahabir Prasad Bhargava	INC	
Uttar Pradesh	Nawab Singh Chauhan	INC	res. 21/06/1963
Uttar Pradesh	A Dharam Das	INC	Dea. 27/07/1960
Uttar Pradesh	Dr Dharam Prakash	INC	
Uttar Pradesh	Shyam Dhar Misra	INC	01/03/1962
Uttar Pradesh	Tarkeshwar Pande	INC	
Uttar Pradesh	Pandit Govind Ballabh Pant	INC	dea.07/03/1961
Uttar Pradesh	Ajit pratap Singh	INC	28/02/1962
Uttar Pradesh	Pandit Sham Sundar Narain Tankha	INC	
Madhya Pradesh	Banarasi Das Chaturvedi	INC	earlier fr Vindyachal P
West Bengal	A Ahmed	INC	
West Bengal	Santosh Kumar Basu	INC	
West Bengal	Atinath Nath Bose	OTH	Dea. 17/10/1961
West Bengal	Maya Devi Chettry	INC	
West Bengal	Bhupesh Gupta	CPI	

== Bye-elections ==
The following bye elections were held in the year 1958.

State - Member - Party

1. Assam - Lila Dhar Barooah - INC ( ele 27/08/1958 term till 1960 )
2. Andhra - B Gopala Reddi - INC ( ele 18/08/1958 term till 1960 )
3. Delhi - Ahmed A Mirza - IND ( ele 17/09/1958 term till 1964 )
4. Madras - Abdul Rahim - INC ( term till 1962 )
5. Rajasthan - Sadiq Ali - INC ( ( ele 04/11/1958 term till 1964 )
6. Uttar Pradesh - Dr Dharam Prakash - INC ( ele 09/08/1958 term till 1962 )
7. Uttar Pradesh - Hafiz Mohamad Ibrahim - INC ( ele 18/08/1958 term till 1962 )
