= Krishnarajanagara Assembly constituency =

Legislative Assembly constituency in Karnataka State, India

Coordinates: 12.44°N 76.38°E

Krishnarajanagara
- Constituency No. 211 for the Karnataka Legislative Assembly
- Map of Vidhana Sabha constituency

Constituency details
- Country: India
- Region: South India
- State: Karnataka
- District: Mysore
- Lok Sabha constituency: Mandya
- Established: 1951
- Total electors: 218,050 (2023)
- Reservation: None

Member of Legislative Assembly
- 16th Karnataka Legislative Assembly
- Incumbent D. Ravishankar
- Party: Indian National Congress
- Elected year: 2023
- Preceded by: S. R. Mahesh

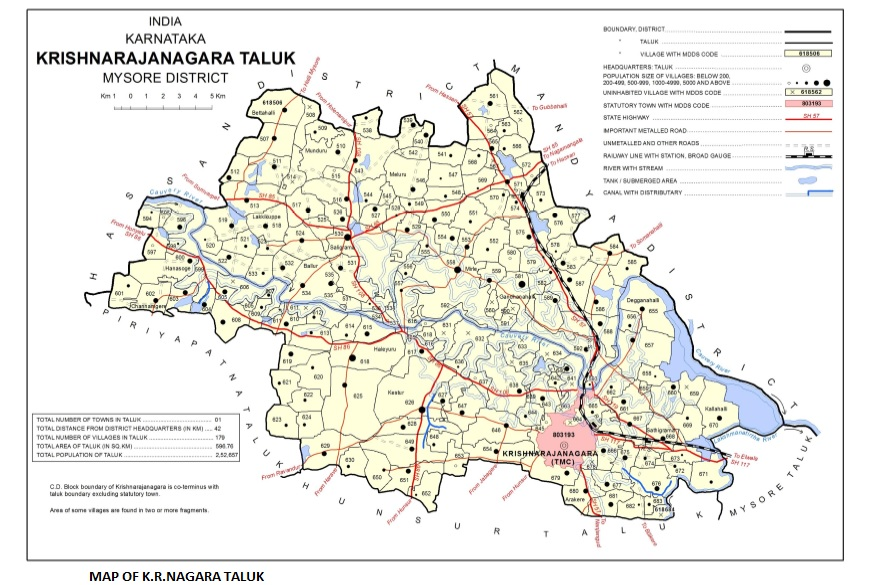
Taluk boundary same as Assembly Constituency as per 2011 Census

Assembly Constituencies of Mysore district

Krishnarajanagara Assembly constituency is one of the 224 Legislative Assembly constituencies of Karnataka in India.

It is part of Mysore district.

== Members of the Legislative Assembly ==
Year	Member	Political party
1952	S. H. Thammaiya (Note: Alias Hanumanthe Gowdara)	Independent politician
1957	H. M. Channabasappa	Indian National Congress
1962	K. S. Gowdaiah	Independent politician
1967	M. Basavaraju	Independent politician
1972	H. B. Kenche Gowda	Indian National Congress
1978	Adagur H. Vishwanath	Indian National Congress (I)
1983	S. Nanjappa	Janata Party
1985	S. Nanjappa	Janata Party
1989	Adagur H. Vishwanath	Indian National Congress
1994	S. Nanjappa	Janata Dal
1999	Adagur H. Vishwanath	Indian National Congress
2004	K. Mahadeva	Janata Dal (Secular)
2008	S. R. Mahesh	Janata Dal (Secular)
2013	S. R. Mahesh	Janata Dal (Secular)
2018	S. R. Mahesh	Janata Dal (Secular)
2023	D. Ravishankar	Indian National Congress

== Election results ==
=== Assembly Election 2023 ===
2023 Karnataka Legislative Assembly election : Krishnarajanagara
Party	Candidate	Votes	%	±%
INC	D. Ravishankar	104,502	55.34%	▲7.78
JD(S)	Sa. Ra. Mahesh	78,863	41.76%	▼6.81
BJP	Hosahalli Venkatesh	2,350	1.24%	▼0.31
NOTA	None of the above	539	0.29%	▼0.39
Margin of victory		25,639	13.58%	▲12.56
Turnout		188,886	86.63%	▲0.76
Total valid votes		188,841		
Registered electors		218,050		▲6.79
INC gain from JD(S)		Swing	▲6.77	

=== Assembly Election 2018 ===
2018 Karnataka Legislative Assembly election : Krishnarajanagara
Party	Candidate	Votes	%	±%
JD(S)	Sa. Ra. Mahesh	85,011	48.57%	▼1.87
INC	D. Ravishankar	83,232	47.56%	▲6.44
BJP	H. G. Shwetha Gopala	2,716	1.55%	▲0.40
Independent	Hosahalli Venkatesh	1,743	1.00%	New
NOTA	None of the above	1,193	0.68%	New
Margin of victory		1,779	1.02%	▼8.30
Turnout		175,331	85.87%	▲2.26
Total valid votes		175,017		
Registered electors		204,182		▲8.32
JD(S) hold		Swing	▼1.87	

=== Assembly Election 2013 ===
2013 Karnataka Legislative Assembly election : Krishnarajanagara
Party	Candidate	Votes	%	±%
JD(S)	Sa. Ra. Mahesh	81,457	50.44%	▼3.24
INC	Doddaswamegowda	66,405	41.12%	▲1.71
KJP	Basant. K. N	3,827	2.37%	New
BJP	M. P. Kumara	1,860	1.15%	▼1.74
BSP	Lakshmana. D	1,812	1.12%	▼1.08
Independent	G. B. Dharmendra	1,416	0.88%	New
Margin of victory		15,052	9.32%	▼4.94
Turnout		157,604	83.61%	▲3.16
Total valid votes		161,496		
Registered electors		188,498		▲5.26
JD(S) hold		Swing	▼3.24	

=== Assembly Election 2008 ===
2008 Karnataka Legislative Assembly election : Krishnarajanagara
Party	Candidate	Votes	%	±%
JD(S)	S. R. Mahesh	77,322	53.68%	▲18.36
INC	Adagur H. Vishwanath	56,774	39.41%	▲4.37
BJP	K. C. Putta Siddasetty	4,158	2.89%	▼18.15
BSP	Dr. S. P. Yoganna	3,170	2.20%	▼3.10
Independent	Rajendra. K. J	2,631	1.83%	New
Margin of victory		20,548	14.26%	▲13.98
Turnout		144,077	80.45%	▲5.98
Total valid votes		144,055		
Registered electors		179,084		▲16.77
JD(S) hold		Swing	▲18.36	

=== Assembly Election 2004 ===
2004 Karnataka Legislative Assembly election : Krishnarajanagara
Party	Candidate	Votes	%	±%
JD(S)	K. Mahadeva	40,341	35.32%	▲11.99
INC	Viswanath. H	40,018	35.04%	▼18.88
BJP	Sa. Ra. Mahesh	24,028	21.04%	▼1.71
BSP	Mohammed Asgar Pasha	6,048	5.30%	New
Kannada Nadu Party	Palaksha	1,243	1.09%	New
Independent	Lakkegowda. K. R	818	0.72%	New
Margin of victory		323	0.28%	▼30.30
Turnout		114,206	74.47%	▼2.67
Total valid votes		114,203		
Registered electors		153,360		▲9.62
JD(S) gain from INC		Swing	▼18.60	

=== Assembly Election 1999 ===
1999 Karnataka Legislative Assembly election : Krishnarajanagara
Party	Candidate	Votes	%	±%
INC	Adagur H. Vishwanath	58,161	53.92%	▲7.03
JD(S)	K. Mahadeva	25,168	23.33%	New
BJP	S. A. Govindaraju	24,546	22.75%	▲21.01
Margin of victory		32,993	30.58%	▲29.35
Turnout		107,922	77.14%	▼2.71
Total valid votes		107,875		
Rejected ballots		47	0.04%	▼1.35
Registered electors		139,901		▲3.92
INC gain from JD		Swing	▲5.79	

=== Assembly Election 1994 ===
1994 Karnataka Legislative Assembly election : Krishnarajanagara
Party	Candidate	Votes	%	±%
JD	S. Nanjappa	51,014	48.13%	▲44.83
INC	H. Vishwanatha	49,707	46.89%	▼18.99
INC	R. N. Nagaraj	2,273	2.14%	New
BJP	Srinivasagowda Mirle	1,844	1.74%	▼0.03
Margin of victory		1,307	1.23%	▼36.30
Turnout		107,499	79.85%	▼1.85
Total valid votes		106,001		
Rejected ballots		1,498	1.39%	▼3.77
Registered electors		134,620		▲11.73
JD gain from INC		Swing	▼17.75	

=== Assembly Election 1989 ===
1989 Karnataka Legislative Assembly election : Krishnarajanagara
Party	Candidate	Votes	%	±%
INC	Adagur H. Vishwanath	61,509	65.88%	▲19.63
JP	S. Nanjappa	26,467	28.35%	New
JD	G. Prakash	3,079	3.30%	New
BJP	S. A. Ajit Raj	1,652	1.77%	▼0.43
Margin of victory		35,042	37.53%	▲33.26
Turnout		98,439	81.70%	▲8.83
Total valid votes		93,364		
Rejected ballots		5,075	5.16%	▲3.52
Registered electors		120,489		▲31.54
INC gain from JP		Swing	▲15.36	

=== Assembly Election 1985 ===
1985 Karnataka Legislative Assembly election : Krishnarajanagara
Party	Candidate	Votes	%	±%
JP	S. Nanjappa	33,170	50.52%	▼3.87
INC	H. Vishwanatha	30,366	46.25%	▲2.99
BJP	Thontadarya	1,444	2.20%	▲0.69
Independent	Y. C. Revanna	582	0.89%	New
Margin of victory		2,804	4.27%	▼6.87
Turnout		66,750	72.87%	▼7.42
Total valid votes		65,654		
Rejected ballots		1,096	1.64%	▼0.39
Registered electors		91,599		▲9.19
JP hold		Swing	▼3.87	

=== Assembly Election 1983 ===
1983 Karnataka Legislative Assembly election : Krishnarajanagara
Party	Candidate	Votes	%	±%
JP	S. Nanjappa	35,896	54.39%	▲14.42
INC	Viswanath. H	28,546	43.26%	▲38.82
BJP	Thontadarya	995	1.51%	New
INC(J)	Y. S. Lingaiah	555	0.84%	New
Margin of victory		7,350	11.14%	▼3.79
Turnout		67,357	80.29%	▲0.74
Total valid votes		65,992		
Rejected ballots		1,365	2.03%	▼0.21
Registered electors		83,891		▲6.68
JP gain from INC(I)		Swing	▼0.50	

=== Assembly Election 1978 ===
1978 Karnataka Legislative Assembly election : Krishnarajanagara
Party	Candidate	Votes	%	±%
INC(I)	Adagur H. Vishwanath	33,571	54.89%	New
JP	S. Nanjappa	24,441	39.97%	New
INC	S. B. Javare Gowda	2,717	4.44%	▼33.43
Margin of victory		9,130	14.93%	▲2.61
Turnout		62,555	79.55%	▲13.93
Total valid votes		61,155		
Rejected ballots		1,400	2.24%	▲2.24
Registered electors		78,637		▲21.79
INC(I) gain from INC		Swing	▲17.02	

=== Assembly Election 1972 ===
1972 Mysore State Legislative Assembly election : Krishnarajanagara
Party	Candidate	Votes	%	±%
INC	H. B. Kenche Gowda	15,604	37.87%	▲19.45
INC(O)	H. L. Thimmegowda	10,526	25.55%	New
Independent	M. Basavaraju	9,395	22.80%	New
Independent	G. S. Gangaiah	2,775	6.74%	New
SWA	Kempegowda	1,082	2.63%	New
Independent	Lakshmanegowda	881	2.14%	New
Independent	M. A. Javaregowda	690	1.67%	New
Independent	L. K. Siddappa	249	0.60%	New
Margin of victory		5,078	12.32%	▲2.54
Turnout		42,370	65.62%	▼4.14
Total valid votes		41,202		
Registered electors		64,568		▲16.70
INC gain from Independent		Swing	▲8.21	

=== Assembly Election 1967 ===
1967 Mysore State Legislative Assembly election : Krishnarajanagara
Party	Candidate	Votes	%	±%
Independent	M. Basavaraju	10,418	29.66%	New
Independent	S. H. R. Gowda	6,983	19.88%	New
INC	K. S. Gowdaiah	6,471	18.42%	▼28.52
ABJS	Y. S. Lingaiah	5,817	16.56%	New
Independent	S. B. Boranna	4,058	11.55%	New
Independent	B. Gowda	1,376	3.92%	New
Margin of victory		3,435	9.78%	▲3.66
Turnout		38,595	69.76%	▼0.57
Total valid votes		35,123		
Registered electors		55,327		▼6.31
Independent hold		Swing	▼23.40	

=== Assembly Election 1962 ===
1962 Mysore State Legislative Assembly election : Krishnarajanagara
Party	Candidate	Votes	%	±%
Independent	K. S. Gowdaiah	20,976	53.06%	New
INC	H. M. Channabasappa	18,557	46.94%	▼8.00
Margin of victory		2,419	6.12%	▼11.46
Turnout		41,531	70.33%	▲1.70
Total valid votes		39,533		
Registered electors		59,051		▲19.62
Independent gain from INC		Swing	▼1.88	

=== Assembly Election 1957 ===
1957 Mysore State Legislative Assembly election : Krishnarajanagara
Party	Candidate	Votes	%	±%
INC	H. M. Channabasappa	18,615	54.94%	▲27.88
Independent	K. S. Gowdaiah	12,659	37.36%	New
Independent	H. B. Kenche Gowda	1,436	4.24%	New
PSP	C. L. Veerathaiah	1,171	3.46%	New
Margin of victory		5,956	17.58%	▲9.70
Turnout		33,881	68.63%	▲10.04
Total valid votes		33,881		
Registered electors		49,366		▲29.26
INC gain from Independent		Swing	▲19.99	

=== Assembly Election 1952 ===
1952 Mysore State Legislative Assembly election : Krishnarajanagara
Party	Candidate	Votes	%	±%
Independent	S. H. Thammaiya Alias Hanumanthe Gowdara	7,820	34.95%	New
INC	M. L. Nanjaraja Urs	6,056	27.06%	New
Socialist Party (India)	K. S. Gowdaiah	4,073	18.20%	New
KMPP	B. Shiddalinga Shetty	3,695	16.51%	New
Independent	L. K. Siddappa	732	3.27%	New
Margin of victory		1,764	7.88%	
Turnout		22,376	58.59%	
Total valid votes		22,376		
Registered electors		38,190		
Independent win (new seat)				

== See also ==
- List of constituencies of the Karnataka Legislative Assembly
- Mysore district
