= 2019 Rajya Sabha elections =

Elections for the upper house of Indian Parliament

- 31 May – 5 December 2019

22 seats in the Rajya Sabha (Note: Including 14 casual vacancies)
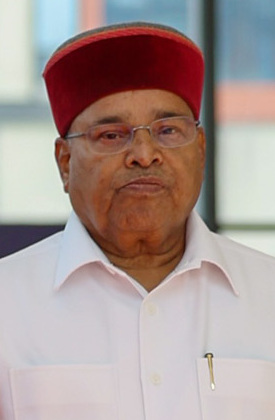

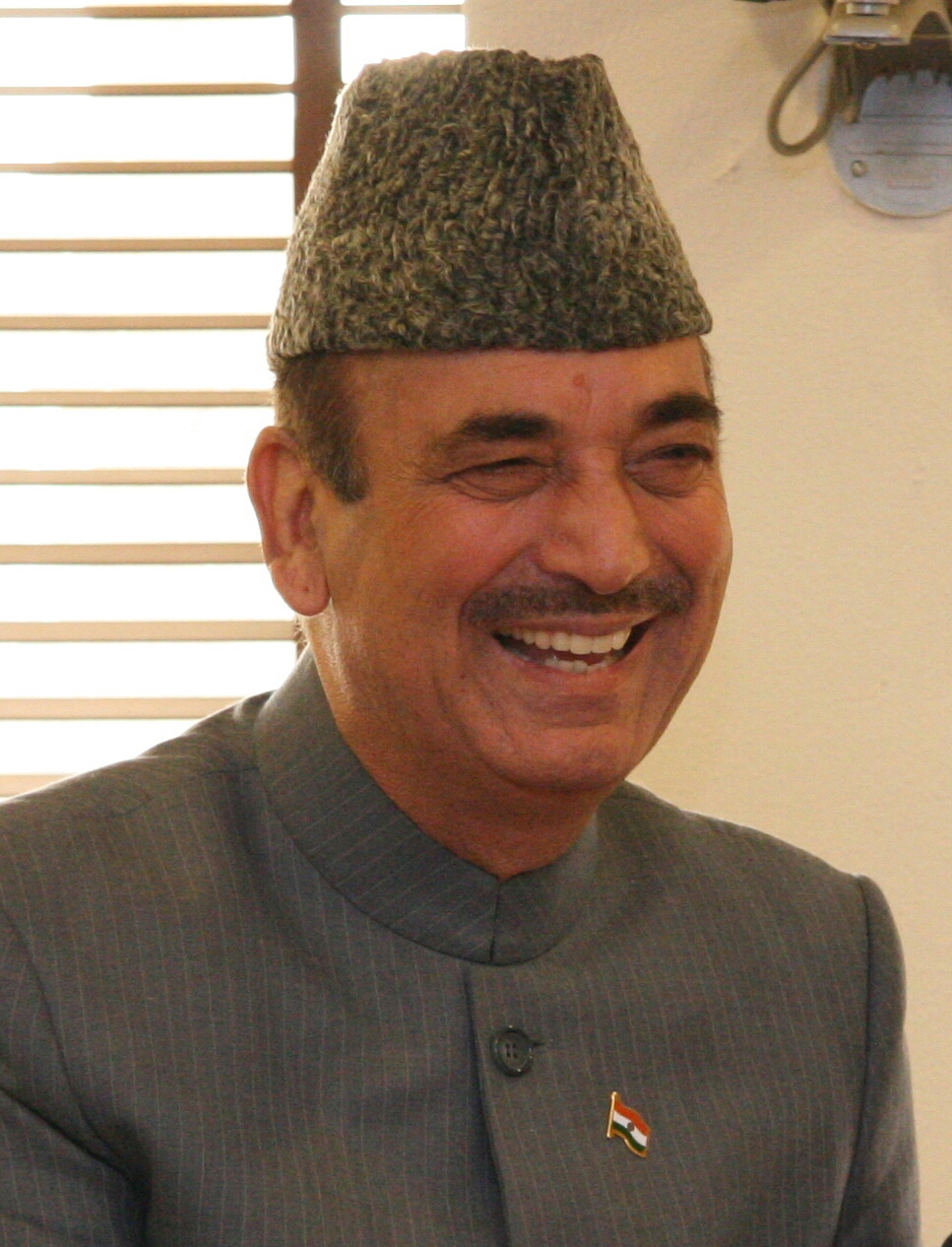
	First party	Second party
Leader	Thawar Chand Gehlot	Ghulam Nabi Azad
Party	BJP	INC
Alliance	NDA	UPA
Leader since	11 June 2019	8 June 2014
Leader's seat	Madhya Pradesh	Jammu and Kashmir
Seats before	73	50
Seats after	83	46
Seat change	▲10	▼4

2019 Rajya Sabha elections were held throughout 2019, to fill the vacancies in the Rajya Sabha, the Indian Parliament's upper chamber. The elections were held to elect 2 members from Assam as well as 6 members from Tamil Nadu. By-elections were held for 14 seats among various states.

The elections resulted in the ruling BJP maintaining and increasing their majority with a net gain of 6 seats.

== Results ==
=== Elections ===
==== Assam ====
Seat No	Previous MP	Previous Party	Elected MP	Elected Party	Reference
1	Manmohan Singh	Indian National Congress	Kamakhya Prasad Tasa	Bharatiya Janata Party	
2	Santiuse Kujur	Indian National Congress	Birendra Prasad Baishya	Asom Gana Parishad	

==== Tamil Nadu ====
Seat No	Previous MP	Previous Party	Elected MP	Elected Party	Reference
1	R. Lakshmanan	All India Anna Dravida Munnetra Kazhagam	A. Mohammedjan	All India Anna Dravida Munnetra Kazhagam	
2	V. Maitreyan	All India Anna Dravida Munnetra Kazhagam	N. Chandrasekaran	All India Anna Dravida Munnetra Kazhagam	
3	K. R. Arjunan	All India Anna Dravida Munnetra Kazhagam	Anbumani Ramadoss	Pattali Makkal Katchi	
4	T. Rathinavel	All India Anna Dravida Munnetra Kazhagam	M. Shanmugam	Dravida Munnetra Kazhagam	
5	Kanimozhi	Dravida Munnetra Kazhagam	P. Wilson	Dravida Munnetra Kazhagam	
6	D. Raja	Communist Party of India	Vaiko	Marumalarchi Dravida Munnetra Kazhagam	

=== By-elections ===
Aside from automatic elections, unforeseen vacancies caused by members' resignation, death or disqualification, are unless a few months before the expected natural expiry of the term of tenure, filled via by-elections, which for the Rajya Sabha often take some months to organise.

==== Bihar ====
- On 23 May 2019 Ravi Shankar Prasad Resigned from membership of the Rajya Sabha from Bihar due to his election as the member of Lok Sabha From Patna Sahib
- On 8 September 2019 Ram Jethmalani Had Died

S.No	Former MP	Party	Date of Vacancy	Elected MP	Party	Date of appointment	Date of retirement
1	Ravi Shankar Prasad	Bharatiya Janata Party	23 May 2019	Ram Vilas Paswan	Lok Janshakti Party	28 June 2019	2 April 2024
2	Ram Jethmalani	Rashtriya Janata Dal	8 September 2019	Satish Chandra Dubey	Bharatiya Janata Party	9 October 2019	7 July 2022

==== Gujarat ====
- On 23 May 2019 Amit Shah Resigned from membership of the Rajya Sabha from Gujarat due to his election as the member of Lok Sabha From Gandhinagar
- On 24 May 2019 Smriti Irani Resigned from membership of the Rajya Sabha from Gujarat due to her election as the member of Lok Sabha From Amethi

S.No	Former MP	Party	Date of Vacancy	Elected MP	Party	Date of appointment	Date of retirement
1	Amit Shah	Bharatiya Janata Party	23 May 2019	S. Jaishankar	Bharatiya Janata Party	5 July 2019	18 August 2023
2	Smriti Irani	Bharatiya Janata Party	24 May 2019	Jugalji Thakore	Bharatiya Janata Party	5 July 2019	18 August 2023

==== Odisha ====
- On 24 May 2019 Achyuta Samanta Resigned from membership of the Rajya Sabha from Odisha due to his election as the member of Lok Sabha From Kandhamal
- On 6 June 2019 Soumya Ranjan Patnaik Resigned from membership of the Rajya Sabha from Odisha due to his election as the member of Odisha Legislative Assembly From Khandapada
- On 6 June 2019 Pratap Keshari Deb Resigned from membership of the Rajya Sabha from Odisha due to his election as the member of Odisha Legislative Assembly From Aul

S.No	Former MP	Party	Date of Vacancy	Elected MP	Party	Date of appointment	Date of retirement
1	Achyuta Samanta	Biju Janata Dal	24 May 2019	Ashwini Vaishnaw	Bharatiya Janata Party	28 June 2019	3 April 2024
2	Soumya Ranjan Patnaik	Biju Janata Dal	6 June 2019	Amar Patnaik	Biju Janata Dal	28 June 2019	3 April 2024
3	Pratap Keshari Deb	Biju Janata Dal	9 June 2019	Sasmit Patra	Biju Janata Dal	28 June 2019	1 July 2022

==== Rajasthan ====
- 24 June 2019 Madan Lal Saini Had Died

S.No	Former MP	Party	Date of Vacancy	Elected MP	Party	Date of appointment	Date of retirement
1	Madan Lal Saini	Bharatiya Janata Party	24 June 2019	Manmohan Singh	Indian National Congress	26 August 2019	3 April 2024

==== Uttar Pradesh ====
- On 15 July 2019 Neeraj Sekhar Resigned from membership of the Rajya Sabha from Uttar Pradesh And Membership Of Samajwadi Party And Joined Bharatiya Janata Party
- On 2 August 2019 Surendra Singh Nagar Resigned from membership of the Rajya Sabha from Uttar Pradesh And Membership Of Samajwadi Party And Joined Bharatiya Janata Party
- On 5 August 2019 Sanjay Seth Resigned from membership of the Rajya Sabha from Uttar Pradesh And Membership Of Samajwadi Party And Joined Bharatiya Janata Party
- On 24 August 2019 Arun Jaitley Had Died
- On 24 October 2019 Tazeen Fatma Resigned from membership of the Rajya Sabha from Uttar Pradesh due to her election as the member of Uttar Pradesh Legislative Assembly On 21 October by-poll From Rampur

S.No	Former MP	Party	Date of Vacancy	Elected MP	Party	Date of appointment	Date of retirement
1	Neeraj Shekhar	Samajwadi Party	15 July 2019	Neeraj Shekhar	Bharatiya Janata Party	26 August 2019	25 November 2020
2	Surendra Singh Nagar	Samajwadi Party	2 August 2019	Surendra Singh Nagar	Bharatiya Janata Party	16 September 2019	4 July 2022
3	Sanjay Seth	Samajwadi Party	5 August 2019	Sanjay Seth	Bharatiya Janata Party	16 September 2019	4 July 2022
4	Arun Jaitley	Bharatiya Janata Party	24 August 2019	Sudhanshu Trivedi	Bharatiya Janata Party	9 October 2019	2 April 2024
5	Tazeen Fatma	Samajwadi Party	24 October 2019	Arun Singh	Bharatiya Janata Party	5 December 2019	25 November 2020

==== Karnataka ====
- On 16 October 2019 K. C. Ramamurthy Resigned from membership of the Rajya Sabha from Karnataka And Membership of Indian National Congress And Joined Bharatiya Janata Party

S.No	Former MP	Party	Date of Vacancy	Elected MP	Party	Date of appointment	Date of retirement
1	K. C. Ramamurthy	Indian National Congress	16 October 2019	K. C. Ramamurthy	Bharatiya Janata Party	5 December 2019	30 June 2022

== See also ==
- 2019 Indian general election
