= Venkatappa =

Venkatappa may refer to:

== People ==
- J Venkatappa (1928–2010), Indian politician
- K. Venkatappa (1886–1965), Indian painter
- M. V. Venkatappa (1932–2013), Indian politician
- Raja Venkatappa Nayaka, Indian monarch

== Other uses ==
- Venkatappa Art Gallery, art gallery in India
- Varnashilpi Venkatappa Award, painting award
