= Basavaraj =

Basavaraj may refer to:

- Basavaraj Durga Island, Indian parcel of land

== Surnames ==
- Byrati Basavaraj (born 1964), Indian politician
- G. S. Basavaraj (born 1941), Indian politician
- H. R. Basavaraj (1921–1999), Indian politician

== Given names ==
- Basavaraj Bommai (born 1960), Indian politician and engineer
  - Basavaraj Bommai ministry
- Basavaraj Horatti (born 1946), Indian politician
- Basavaraj Kattimani (1919–1989), Indian progressive writer, novelist and journalist
- Basavaraj Patil Attur (born 1952), Indian politician
- Basavaraj Rajguru (1920–1991), Indian classical vocalist
- Basavaraj Rayareddy (born 1956), Indian politician
- Basavaraj Shivannanavar (born 1956), Indian politician

== See also ==
- K. Rajashekar Basavaraj Hitnal (born 1979), Indian politician
- Rajashekhar Basavaraj Patil (born 1975), Indian politician
