= Kakade =

Kakade is an Indian surname. Notable people with the surname include:

- Bandya Kakade (c. 1945–2012), Indian footballer
- Kartik Kakade (born 1995), Indian cricketer
- Sambhajirao Kakade (1931–2021), Indian politician
- Sanjay Kakade (born 29 August 1967), Indian politician
- Sham Kakade, American computer scientist
