= Lehar Singh Siroya =

Indian politician

Lahar Singh Siroya
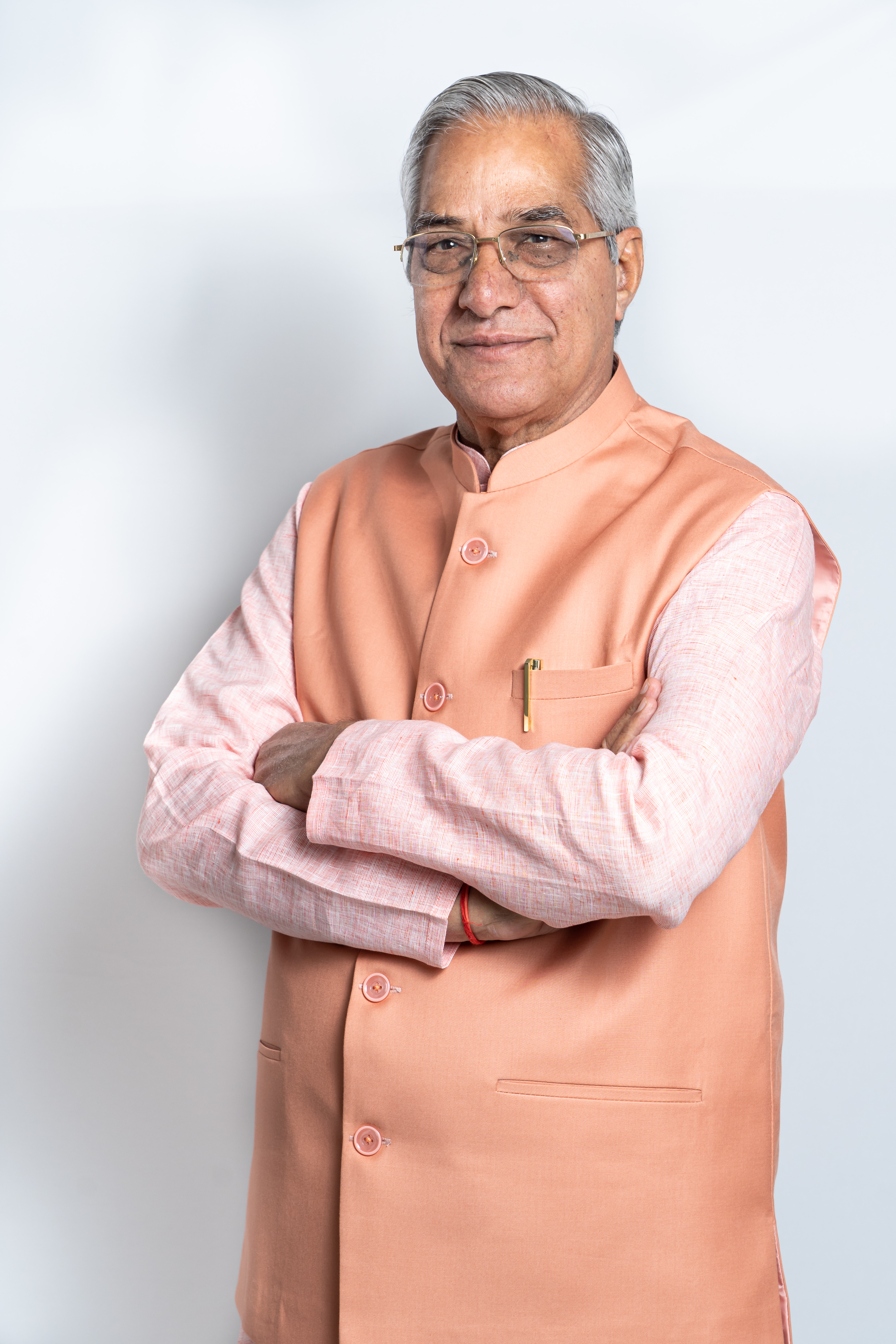

Member of Parliament, Rajya Sabha
- Incumbent
- Assumed office 1 July 2022
- Preceded by: Oscar Fernandes
- Constituency: Karnataka

Member of the Karnataka Legislative Council
- In office 14 June 2016 – 13 June 2022
- Constituency: Elected by Legislative Assembly members
- In office 29 May 2010 – 28 May 2016
- Constituency: Nominated by Governor

Personal details
- Born: 14 July 1948 (age 78) Kunwariya, Udaipur State (present-day Rajasthan), India
- Party: BJP
- Spouse: Shanta Bai Siroya
- Children: Deepak Kumar Siroya, Sanjay Kumar Siroya, Asha Gandhi
- Parent: Kesarilal Siroya (father)
- Education: [10th Pass]
- Occupation: Politician, Entrepreneur

Lahar Singh Siroya (born 14 July 1948) is an Indian politician of the Bharatiya Janata Party (BJP). He got elected to Rajya Sabha (Upper House) as a Member of Parliament from Karnataka in July 2022. Previously Lahar Singh was a Member of the Karnataka Legislative Council for two consecutive terms from June 2010 to June 2022.

Lahar Singh is an entrepreneur by profession and a politician by passion. As a senior party member, he has held various positions in the party from time to time. Currently, he is the co-treasurer of BJP Karnataka.

A political strategist, Lahar Singh, is known to have the ear of people who matter in the BJP and is a crucial figure at the national level on political affairs of Karnataka. Lahar Singh is known to be close to Prime Minister Shri Narendra Modi and former Karnataka Chief Minister B.S. Yediyurappa and is a interlocutor between the top BJP leadership in Delhi and Karnataka.

== Political career ==
In his two terms as a member of the Karnataka legislative council, Lahar Singh has often raised issues of public interest, focusing on the deterioration of the city of Bengaluru, the issue of corruption, and drug usage among youths.

While Lahar Singh is known for taking up issues like the drug menace and many others, on the other hand, he is famous across the country for often being surrounded by controversies.

In 2010, Lahar Singh sparked an uproar across the country when he published an advertisement in all Hindi dailies congratulating Narendra Modi, who was then the Gujarat Chief Minister, on winning the panchayat elections. The advertisement was also interpreted as a response to Sushma Swaraj's statement during her campaign in Bihar where she mocked Narendra Modi for having a reach only in Gujarat and not the rest of the country.

In May 2013, Lahar Singh wrote an open letter alleging that L.K. Advani, the then BJP President, had compromised on corruption in the past when it suited his interest. He accused Advani of taking a moral high ground over corruption and pushing for B.S.Yediyurappa's removal from the BJP, resulting in the party's loss in the Karnataka State Election. Lahar Singh was temporarily suspended by the party over the issue.

In July 2022, Lahar Singh was elected to the Rajya Sabha from Karnataka. With no strong caste backing in Karnataka and limited acceptance within the state BJP unit, his victory in the Rajya Sabha elections reflects his stature and relationship with the BJP's national leadership.

=== Pradhan Mantri TB Mukt Bharat Abhiyaan ===
Responding to PM Narendra Modi's call for community participation to achieve TB Mukt Bharat by 2025, on 25 November 2022, Lahar Singh Siroya adopted 500 TB patients in Bengaluru under PM's Nikshay Mitra initiative and pledged to contribute and work to make Karnataka free from TB. The adopted patients have been receiving food kits that consist of essential nutrition to aid them in their recovery.

On Lahar Singh's appeal, many industrialists and businessmen came forward and have adopted nearly 1400 TB patients in Bengaluru (as of June 2023).

In January 2023, from his MPLAD funds, Lahar Singh also donated a CBNAAT machine and a mobile handheld X-Ray machine to Dr. Babu Jagjivan Ram BBMP Referral Hospital in Chamarajapet, in Bengaluru. These machines will help in fast, accurate, and comprehensive testing of TB patients.

=== Establishing Crafts Village on the Bengaluru-Mysuru expressway ===
In December 2022, Lahar Singh Siroya urged the Central Government to develop 'Crafts Village' on the Bengaluru-Mysuru 10 lane-lane expressway. He raised this demand in the parliament during the Zero Hour in Rajya Sabha, urging the Government to establish Crafts Village on the vacant lands along the highway, which will provide space for Channapatna artists to showcase and sell their toys & handicrafts and build restaurants to offer the most sought-after local cuisine.

Lahar Singh met Union Minister for Road Transport and Highways Nitin Gadkari and Union Minister for Micro, Small and Medium Enterprises Narayan Rane on this issue and offered to coordinate with the Highways ministry, state government, and local elected representatives to ensure the idea of Crafts Village becomes a reality.

Keeping aside the political differences, Lahar Singh Siroya also called on Karnataka Congress President D.K. Shivakumar and Bengaluru Rural Congress Member of Parliament D.K. Suresh to take ahead the idea of establishing a crafts village on the Bengaluru-Mysuru expressway to protect artisans of Channapatna toys. He also met JDS Leader and former Karnataka Chief Minister H.D. Kumaraswamy and requested his support.

== Positions held ==
Date	Position
2022 – Till Date	Member, Consultative Committee for the Ministry of Home Affairs
2022 – Till Date	Member, Committee on Communications and Information Technology
2022 – Till Date	Member of Parliament from Karnataka in Rajya Sabha
2016–2022	Member, Legislative Council Karnataka
2010–2016	Member, Legislative Council Karnataka
2009–2010	Director, Karnataka Power Corporation Limited
2006 – Till date	Treasurer, BJP Karnataka
2004	State BJP Office Bearer (Nidhi Pramukh)
1993–2002	National Council Member, BJP
1988–1990	State Executive Member, BJP Karnataka
1980	General Secretary, Bharatiya Janatha Yuva Morcha
1972	Started Political Career as Treasurer of Local Body
