= Y Sayeed Ahmed =

INC politician from Karnataka, India

General Secretary, Bangalore City Youth Congress
- In office 1979–1982

Vice President, Bangalore City Youth Congress
- In office 1982–1984

Organizing Secretary, Karnataka Pradesh Youth Congress
- In office 1984–1987

General Secretary, Karnataka PradeshYouth Congress
- In office 1987–1989

Vice President, Karnataka Pradesh Youth Congress
- In office 1989–1993

Joint Secretary, Karnataka Pradesh Congress Committee
- In office 1994–1996

General Secretary, Karnataka Pradesh Congress Committee
- In office 1996–1999

General Secretary, Karnataka Pradesh Congress Committee
- In office 1999–2000

General Secretary, Karnataka Pradesh Congress Committee
- In office 2001–2003

Chairman, Minority Department of Karnataka Pradesh Congress Committee
- In office 02 July 2015 – Present

Personal details
- Party: Indian National Congress
- Parent: Late M.Murtuza Khan (father)
- Education: B.A. (Public Administration)
- Occupation: Politician

Y Sayeed Ahmed is a leader of the Indian National Congress and Former Chairman of the State minority cell of the Karnataka Pradesh Congress Committee (KPCC).

== Political career ==
Sayeed Ahmed contested in Karnataka Legislative Assembly election as the candidate from the Congress Party in 1999 from Binnypet (Vidhana Sabha Constituency) and in 2008 from Chamrajpet (Vidhana Sabha constituency) . He was also declared as the official Congress Lok Sabha candidate from Bangalore North Parliamentary Constituency in place of late veteran Congress Leader C.K. Jaffer Sharief in 1996. On 2 July 2015, Y Sayeed Ahmed was appointed as the chairman of the Minority Department of Karnataka Pradesh Congress Committee (KPCC).

== Positions held ==
Political activities and position held
Year	Description
1979-1982	General Secretary, Bangalore City Youth Congress
1982-1984	Vice President, Bangalore City Youth Congress
1984-1987	Organizing Secretary, Karnataka Pradesh Youth Congress
1987-1989	General Secretary, Karnataka Pradesh Youth Congress
1989-1993	Vice President, Karnataka Pradesh Youth Congress
1994-1996	Joint Secretary, Karnataka Pradesh Congress Committee
1996-1999	General Secretary, Karnataka Pradesh Congress Committee
1999-2000	General Secretary, Karnataka Pradesh Congress Committee
2001-2003	General Secretary, Karnataka Pradesh Congress Committee
20.9.1990	Member, Advisory Board, Small Scale Industries Govt of Karnataka
1989	Member, Manifesto Committee, KPPCC
1989	Executive Committee Member, Minority Cell KPCC
1990	Member, Central Board Of Film Censors
20.02.1994	Member, National Council Minority Cell, AICC
