= S. R. Mahesh =

Indian politician

Saligrama Ramegowda Mahesh

Minister of Sericulture and Tourism
- In office 6 June 2018 – 8 July 2019

Member of Karnataka Legislative Assembly
- In office 2008 – 2023
- Preceded by: Manchanahalli Mahadev
- Succeeded by: D. Ravishankar
- Constituency: Krishnarajanagara

Personal details
- Born: 10 August 1966 (age 59) Saligrama
- Party: Janata Dal (Secular)
- Spouse: Anitha Mahesh
- Children: Dr. Dhanush and Jayanth
- Education: Graduate
- As of July, 2021

Saligrama Ramegowda Mahesh is an Indian politician who served as Minister of Tourism and Sericulture from 6 June 2018 to 8 July 2019 and he is ex Member of Karnataka Legislative Assembly from Krishnarajanagara Assembly constituency since 2008.
