= K. Narayan =

Indian politician

Member of Parliament, Rajya Sabha
- In office 24 November 2020 – 25 June 2026
- Preceded by: Ashok Gasti
- Succeeded by: Pawan Khera
- Constituency: Karnataka

Personal details
- Born: Koragappa Narayana; 12 June 1952 (age 74) Mangalore, Karnataka, India
- Party: Bharatiya Janata Party
- Education: B.A
- Occupation: Entrepreneur, Journalist, politician
- Known for: Starting Sambashana Sandesha in 1994, Social Work in the field of education, culture and religion.

Koragappa Narayan is an Indian businessman, journalist and politician who is the current Member of Parliament, Rajya Sabha from Karnataka from 24 November 2020. He is the founder of a monthly Sanskrit magazine Sambashana Sandesha. Narayan is also an editor of Tuluvere Kedige a Tulu magazine.

He is the owner of Span Print and a former Co-convenor of Nekara Prakoshta (weavers' cell) of the Bharatiya Janata Party, Karnataka and an executive director of Hindu Seva Prathishtana. Narayan is also nominated as the BJP's candidate for the Rajya Sabha by-polls from Karnataka.

== Early life ==
Narayan was born in Mangalore, Dakshina Kannada, Karnataka. He completed his schooling and college education at Mangalore and moved to Bengaluru in 1971. He belongs to the Devanga community.

== Journalistic career ==
He has worked as an editor for a Tulu magazine called Tuluvere Kedige.

In 1994, he started a monthly Sanskrit magazine called Sambashana Sandesha. He founded a company called Span Print. He has been active in promoting Sanskrit language through his publications.

== Political career ==
Narayana has been a part of the Rashtriya Swayamsevak Sangh and later joined the Bharatiya Janata Party. He has been the co-convenor of the Bharatiya Janata Party, Karnataka-unit's weavers cell and an executive director of Hindu Seva Prathishtana.

In 2020, he was nominated as the candidate of the BJP for the Rajya Sabha by-poll, to fill the vacant seat due to the death of Ashok Gasti.
