= Surendra Singh Nagar =

Indian politician (born 1965)

Member of Parliament, Rajya Sabha
- Incumbent
- Assumed office 5 Jul 2022
- In office 16 Sep 2019 – 4 Jul 2022
- In office 5 Jul 2016 – 2 Aug 2019
- Constituency: Uttar Pradesh

Member of Parliament, Lok Sabha
- In office 2009–2014
- Preceded by: constituency created
- Succeeded by: Mahesh Sharma
- Constituency: Gautam Buddha Nagar

Personal details
- Born: 10 May 1965 (age 61) Gulaothi, Uttar Pradesh, India
- Party: Bharatiya Janata Party (August 2019–present)
- Other political affiliations: Samajwadi Party (2014 – August 2019); Bahujan Samaj Party (May 2008–2014)
- Spouse: Rakhi Nagar (m. 1987)
- Children: 3 (2 sons and 1 daughter)
- Parents: Ved Ram Nagar (father); Dharam Wati Nagar (mother)
- Education: SSV College, Hapur
- Profession: Agriculturist, Businessperson, Politician

Surendra Singh Nagar (born 10 May 1965) is an Indian politician and Member of Parliament in Rajya Sabha since July 2016. He was also a Member of Parliament in the 15th Lok Sabha from Gautam Buddha Nagar constituency of Uttar Pradesh as a Bahujan Samaj Party candidate. He was a member of Bahujan Samaj Party from May 2008 to 2014. He joined Samajwadi Party before the Lok Sabha elections in 2014. On 10 August 2019, he joined Bharatiya Janta Party.

== Personal life ==
Surendra Nagar was born on 10 May 1965 in the village of Gulaothi of Bulandshahr district in Uttar Pradesh to Ved Ram Nagar and Dharam Wati Nagar. He holds a B.Com. degree from SSV College in Hapur. He married Rakhi Nagar 2 May 1987, with whom he has two sons and a daughter. By profession, Nagar is an agriculturist and businessman.

== Political career ==
Nagar has been in active politics since 1990s and has held various posts during the years. This is his first term as M.P.

Prior to becoming M.P., Nagar was also two term member of Uttar Pradesh Legislative Council.

In June 2016, he became a Member of Parliament in Rajya Sabha. He resigned on 2 August 2019.

On 10 August 2019, Nagar joined Bharatiya Janta Party.

== Positions held ==
Surendra Singh Nagar has been elected 1 time as Lok Sabha MP and 3 times as Rajya Sabha MP.

#	From	To	Position	Party
1.	1998	2004	MLC (1st term) in Uttar Pradesh Legislative Council	
2.	2004	2009	MLC (2nd term) in Uttar Pradesh Legislative Council (resigned in 2009)	
3.	2009	2014	MP (1st term) in 15th Lok Sabha from Gautam Buddha Nagar	BSP
4.	2016	2019	MP (1st term) in Rajya Sabha from Uttar Pradesh (resigned in 2019)	SP
5.	2019	2022	MP (2nd term) in Rajya Sabha from Uttar Pradesh (by-poll)	BJP
6.	2022	Present	MP (3rd term) in Rajya Sabha from Uttar Pradesh	BJP

== See also ==
- 15th Lok Sabha
- Politics of India
- Parliament of India
- Government of India
- Bahujan Samaj Party
- Gautam Buddha Nagar (Lok Sabha constituency)
- Uttar Pradesh Legislative Assembly

Lok Sabha
Preceded by Constituency Created	Member of Parliament for Gautam Buddh Nagar; 2009–2014	Succeeded by Mahesh Sharma
