= G. C. Chandrashekhar =

Indian politician

- ಜಿ. ಸಿ. ಚಂದ್ರಶೇಖರ್
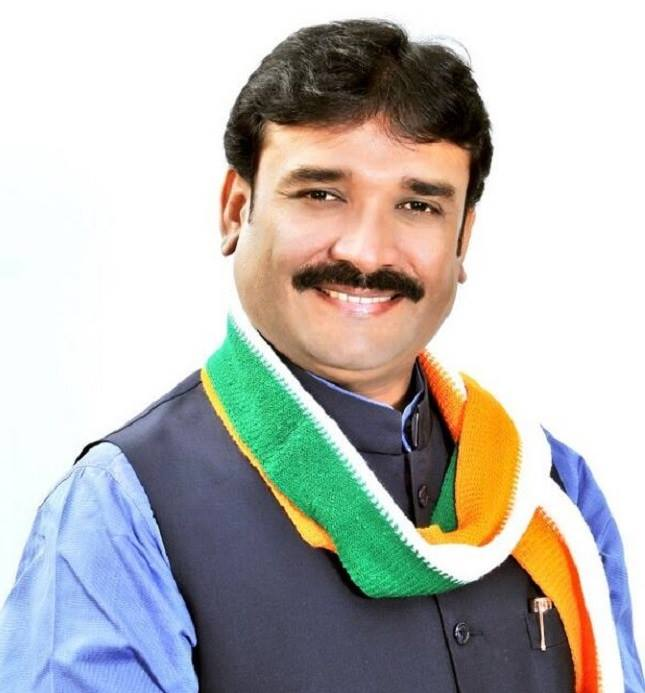

Member of Parliament, Rajya Sabha for Karnataka.
- Incumbent
- Assumed office 6 April 2018

General Secretary of Indian National Congress
- In office 2010–2014

Chairman of Karnataka Urban Water Supply Board
- In office 2014–2016

Chairman of Sarva Shiksha Abhiyan
- In office 2003–2004

Personal details
- Born: 12 February 1969 (age 57) Mirle, Mysuru District, Karnataka, India
- Party: Indian National Congress
- Spouse: Sudha (m. 21 June 1999)
- Education: Master of Arts in Public Administration

Gangur Cheluvegowda Chandrashekhar is an Indian politician from the Indian National Congress. He is also a member of the Rajya Sabha for Karnataka. He took oath in Kannada which was praised by Vice President of India.

Chandrashekhar is currently Member of Parliament in Rajya Sabha and Working President at Karnataka Pradesh Congress Committee (KPCC) and has served as the Chairman of the Karnataka Urban Water Supply Board. Prior to that he has served as a General Secretary and spokesperson for the Karnataka Pradesh Congress Committee. He has also served as political secretary to G. Parameshwara, the President of the Karnataka Pradesh Congress Committee. He has also served as Chairman for the Sarva Shiksha Abhiyan.

== Early life and education ==
Chandrashekhar is from a small village, Ganguru, situated in Hassan District, Karnataka, India. He studied Public Administration at the Government College, Hassan in 1985 obtaining a Master of Arts degree in Public Administration.

== Career ==
Chandrashekhar was the Chairman of Karnataka Urban Water Supply Board. Prior to that, he served as a General Secretary and spokesperson for the Karnataka Pradesh Congress Committee and as the political secretary to Karnataka Pradesh Congress Committee president, G. Parameshwara.

== Political career ==
Chandrashekhar joined the Indian National Congress (INC) in 2003 and has served as a spokesperson for the party. He was one of three candidates nominated by the INC to contest the Rajya Sabha elections on 23 March 2018. He successfully contested the seat of Karnataka by getting 46 first preference votes out of 185.

Chandrashekhar as chairman of KUWSDB got in lot of changes which were revolutionary. Urban Development Minister Vinaykumar Sorake said that this was a first-of-its-kind service in India and was open to everybody. The control rooms also provide information pertaining to KUWSDB and its ongoing works. Under the guidance of Chandrashekhar the Karnataka Urban Water Supply and Drainage Board office was temporarily converted into a control room following floods in Chennai. Google search engine selected it as the first step communication for those looking for information on Chennai floods.

Chandrashekhar received the Guard of Honor on the occasion of 67th Republic Day on 26 January 2016, which is a ceremonial ritual practiced in the commonwealth countries.

Chandrashekhar took oath in Kannada as a member of Rajya Sabha. The Vice President of India, Venkaiah Naidu, who is also the chairman of Rajya Sabha acknowledged the efforts of Chandrashekhar.

== Positions held ==
- Chairman of Karnataka Urban Water Supply Board
- Advisory member of Sarva Shikshana Abhiyaana
- Political Secretary to Karnataka Pradesh Congress Committee President, G. Parameshwara
- Spokesperson Karnataka Pradesh Congress Committee
- General Secretary to AICC
- Vice President at Karnataka Pradesh Congress Committee
- Member of Parliament Rajya Sabha (Karnataka)
