= D. Ravishankar =

Indian politician

Member of the Karnataka Legislative Assembly
- Incumbent
- Assumed office 13 May 2023
- Preceded by: S. R. Mahesh
- Constituency: Krishnarajanagara

Personal details
- Born: 1 January 1976 (age 50)
- Party: Indian National Congress
- Spouse: Sunitha S R
- Parent: Doddaswamegowda
- Education: BA, LLB from Bangalore University
- Occupation: Politician

D Ravishankar (born 1 January 1976) is an Indian politician from the state of Karnataka. He is a leader of Indian National Congress. He is current MLA of Krishnarajanagara constituency in Mysore District.

== Political career ==
He contested general assembly elections in 2023 from Krishnarajanagara Constituency and won the seat by a huge margin. In 2018 assembly elections he lost to S. R. Mahesh of JDS party by 1779 votes.
