= Iranna B. Kadadi =

Indian politician

Iranna Kadadi

Member of Parliament, Rajya Sabha
- In office 26 June 2020 – 25 June 2026
- Preceded by: B. K. Hariprasad
- Succeeded by: Mansoor Ali Khan
- Constituency: Karnataka

Personal details
- Born: Kalloli, Gokak
- Party: Bharatiya Janata Party

Iranna Kadadi is an Indian politician and a Member of Parliament representing Karnataka in the Rajya Sabha. He served as the Belagavi district Panchayat president in 2010. He also served as Bharatiya Janata Party's Belagavi district unit president. He also served as the chairman of NGEF, Hubli

Kadadi had unsuccessfully contested the assembly election from Arabhavi constituency in 1994 on a BJP ticket. Kadadi belongs to Veerashiva Lingayat community from Belagavi district.

His nomination along with Ashok Gasti to the Rajya Sabha in 2020 came as a surprise from the national leadership of Bharatiya Janata Party as they were never in the limelight. The BJP later said that the party believes in appreciating grass root level workers, hence rewarded them with this opportunity.

== Early life ==
Eranna Kadadi was associated with the BJP from his student days through the Akhil Bharatiya Vidyarthi Parishad (ABVP) and later got involved in the organisation work for the BJP. He started his active political career in 1989.
