= B. Ibrahim =

Indian politician

Member of Rajya Sabha
- In office 25 March 1980 – 9 April 1984

Personal details
- Born: 2 January 1946 (age 80)
- Party: Indian National Congress
- Spouse: Mymoona Ibrahim
- Children: 2 daughters & 2 sons
- Parent: Haji B. Zakria
- Education: B.A., B.L.

B. Ibrahim (born 2 January 1946) is an Indian politician and former member of Rajya Sabha (the upper house of the Parliament of India) from 1980 to 1984.

== Early life and background ==
Ibrahim was born on 2 January 1946. He completed his education in B.A., B.L.

== Personal life ==
Ibrahim married to Mymoona Ibrahim and the couple has 2 daughters and 2 sons

== Position held ==
#	From	To	Position
1	1980	1984	Member of Rajya Sabha (the upper house of the Parliament of India)
