= Dharam Prakash =

Indian politician

Member of Parliament, Rajya Sabha
- In office 1958–1968
- Succeeded by: Ganeshi Lal Chaudhary
- Constituency: Uttar Pradesh

Member of Constituent Assembly of India
- In office 9 December 1946 – 24 January 1950
- Constituency: United Provinces

Dharam Prakash was an Indian politician. He was a Member of Parliament representing Uttar Pradesh in the Rajya Sabha the upper house of India's Parliament as member of the Indian National Congress.
