= Ashok Gasti =

Indian politician

Member of Parliament, Rajya Sabha
- In office 26 June 2020 – 17 September 2020
- Preceded by: Prabhakar Kore
- Succeeded by: K. Narayan
- Constituency: Karnataka

Personal details
- Born: 14 November 1964
- Died: 17 September 2020 (aged 55); Bangalore, Karnataka, India
- Political party: Bharatiya Janata Party
- Education: LL.B.

Ashok Gasti (14 November 1964 – 17 September 2020) was an Indian politician and a lawyer from Raichur, Karnataka. He was a Member of Parliament who represented Karnataka in the Rajya Sabha, the upper house of the Indian Parliament, for less than 3 months until his death in 2020. He previously served as the former general secretary of the BJP's OBC Cell and served as the chairman of the State Backward Class Development Corporation.

== Political life ==
He was a member of the Bharatiya Janata Party and the Rashtriya Swayamsevak Sangh. He belonged to the Savita Samaj. He also served as party in charge for Bellary district, Koppal district and Raichur district.

His nomination along with Eranna Kadadi to the Rajya Sabha in 2020 came as a surprise from the national leadership of Bharatiya Janata Party as they were never in the limelight. The BJP later said that the party believed in appreciating grass root level workers, hence rewarded them with this opportunity. Gasti had been associated with the BJP from his student days through the Akhil Bharatiya Vidyarthi Parishad (ABVP) and later became involved in the organisational work for the BJP. In 1989 he was made the president of Raichur District Yuva Morcha.

== Death ==
Gasti tested positive for COVID-19 during the COVID-19 pandemic in India in September 2020. He was hospitalized at Manipal Hospital and, by 17 September, he was in critical condition with severe pneumonia and multi-organ failure. That same day, senior government officials took to social media to express their condolences for Gasti's death, but the hospital denied this and said the lawmaker remained in critical condition. Hours later, the hospital confirmed that Gasti had died at 10:31 p.m. He was 55 years old.
