= Seeta Yudhvir =

Indian politician

Member of Parliament, Rajya Sabha
- In office 1958–1970
- Constituency: Andhra Pradesh

Personal details
- Born: 9 November 1922
- Died: 21 February 1994 (aged 71)
- Party: Indian National Congress

Seeta Yudhvir (9 November 1922 – 21 February 1994) was an Indian politician. She was a Member of Parliament, representing Andhra Pradesh in the Rajya Sabha the upper house of India's Parliament as a member of the Indian National Congress.
