= Karnataka Pradesh Congress Committee =

Karnataka Pradesh Congress Committee ಕರ್ನಾಟಕ ಪ್ರದೇಶ ಕಾಂಗ್ರೆಸ್ ಸಮಿತಿ
- President: B. K. Hariprasad
- Chairman: D. K. Shivakumar (Chief Minister)
- General Secretary: H.B. Chand Pasha
- Headquarters: Congress Bhawan, Queens Road, Bengaluru, Karnataka
- Youth wing: Karnataka Youth Congress
- Women's wing: Karnataka Pradesh Mahila Congress Committee
- Ideology: Kannadiga nationalism; Liberalism; Third Way; Environmentalism; Regionalism; Civic nationalism; Federalism; Secularism
- Political position: Centre-left
- ECI status: A State Unit of Indian National Congress
- Alliance: Indian National Developmental Inclusive Alliance
- Seats in Rajya Sabha: 7 / 12
- Seats in Lok Sabha: 9 / 28
- Seats in Karnataka Legislative Council: 38 / 75
- Seats in Karnataka Legislative Assembly: 138 / 224

Election symbol

Party flag

Website
- inckarnataka.in

Karnataka Pradesh Congress Committee (Karnataka PCC) is the unit of the Indian National Congress for the state of Karnataka. Its head office is situated at the Congress Bhawan, Queens Road, Bengaluru. It is responsible for organizing and coordinating the party's activities and campaigns within the state, as well as selecting candidates for local, state, and national elections.

The current president of the Karnataka Pradesh Congress Committee is B. K. Hariprasad. The committee has been involved in several political events in the state's history, including the formation of the first democratically elected government in the state in 1952.

== Electoral performance ==
=== Karnataka Legislative Assembly ===
Year	Party leader	Seats won	Change in seats	Outcome
Mysore State
1952	K. Chengalaraya Reddy	74 / 99	▲74	Government
1957	S. Nijalingappa	150 / 208	▲76	Government
1962	S. R. Kanthi	138 / 208	▼12	Government
1967	S. Nijalingappa	126 / 216	▼12	Government
1972	D. Devaraj Urs	165 / 216	▲39	Government
Karnataka
1978	D. Devaraj Urs	149 / 224	▼16	Government
1983	R. Gundu Rao	82 / 224	▼67	Opposition
1985	R. Gundu Rao	65 / 224	▼17	Opposition
1989	Veerendra Patil	178 / 224	▲113	Government
1994	Veerappa Moily	34 / 224	▼144	Opposition
1999	S.M. Krishna	132 / 224	▲98	Government
2004	S.M. Krishna	65 / 224	▼67	Government later Opposition
2008	Mallikarjun Kharge	80 / 224	▲15	Opposition
2013	Siddaramaiah	122 / 224	▲42	Government
2018	Siddaramaiah	80 / 224	▼42	Government later Opposition
2023	Siddaramaiah	135 / 224	▲56	Government

Karnataka Congress Legislative Assembly seat count

=== General Elections ===
Lok Sabha Elections
Year	Lok Sabha	Seats contested	Seats won	Change in seats	Percentage of votes	Vote swing	Popular vote	Outcome
Mysore
1951	1st	11	10 / 11	▲10	53.43%	new	15,09,075	Government
1957	2nd	26	23 / 26	▲13	55.52%	▲2.09	32,19,014	Government
1962	3rd	26	25 / 26	▲2	52.67%	▼2.85	33,81,276	Government
1967	4th	27	18 / 27	▼7	49.02%	▼3.65	37,55,339	Government
1971	5th	27	27 / 27	▲9	70.87%	▲21.85	54,18,541	Government
Karnataka
1977	6th	28	26 / 28	▼1	56.80%	▼14.07	58,33,567	Opposition
1980	7th	28	27 / 28	▲1	56.25%	▼0.55	61,54,746	Government
1984	8th	28	24 / 28	▼3	51.63%	▼4.62	69,74,044	Government
1989	9th	28	27 / 28	▲3	48.90%	▼2.73	90,08,980	Opposition
1991	10th	28	23 / 28	▼4	42.13%	▼6.77	64,90,020	Government
1996	11th	28	5 / 28	▼18	30.29%	▼11.84	56,68,988	Opposition
1998	12th	28	9 / 28	▲4	36.22%	▲5.93	76,42,756	Opposition
1999	13th	28	18 / 28	▲9	45.41%	▲9.19	1,01,50,765	Opposition
2004	14th	28	8 / 28	▼10	36.82%	▼8.59	92,47,605	Government
2009	15th	28	6 / 28	▼2	37.65%	▲0.83	92,50,984	Government
2014	16th	28	9 / 28	▲3	40.80%	▲3.15		Opposition
2019	17th	21	1 / 28	▼8	31.88%	▼8.92	1,12,03,016	Opposition
2024	18th	28	9 / 28	▲8	45.43%	▲13.55	1,75,54,381	Opposition

Karnataka Congress Lok Sabha seat count

== Frontal Organisation Chiefs of Karnataka PCC ==
#	Name of the Organisation	Name of the President
01	Karnataka PCC President	D. K. Shivakumar
02	Karnataka PCC Working Presidents	Tanveer Sait; G. C. Chandrashekhar; Saleem Ahmed; Ramalinga Reddy
03	Karnataka Youth Congress	H. S. Manjunath
04	Karnataka Pradesh Mahila Congress Committee	Sowmya Reddy
05	NSUI Karnataka	Kirthi Ganesh
06	Karnataka Congress Seva Dal	Ramachandra
07	INTUC Karnataka	S.S. Praksham

== Prominent members ==
- Mallikarjun Kharge, AICC president, former Union Railways Minister
- D. K. Shivakumar, Current Chief Minister of Karnataka, former minister of energy, former minister for water resources of Karnataka, former minister for medical education and current KPCC president
- Sunil Kanugolu, Media Advisor to CM, KPCC
- John Paul, Secondary Media Advisor KPCC
- Siddaramaiah, Former Chief Minister of Karnataka
- Y Sayeed Ahmed, (1996-2003), General Secretary, Karnataka Pradesh Congress Committee; (2015–2021) chairman, Minority Department
- G. Parameshwara, former Deputy Chief minister of Karnataka, Home minister of Karnataka, former president of KPCC.
- Veerappa Moily, former Chief Minister of Karnataka, former Union Cabinet minister.
- Dinesh Gundu Rao, former president of KPCC, former minister for Food and Civil Supplies.
- Dr. Shivanand Hulyalkar, Spokesperson for the Indian National Congress, media in-charge, and in-charge for Karnataka for the Congress Party. He is associated with the Kalpataru Group and Sivaan Aviation Pvt. Ltd.

== List of Karnataka PCC Presidents ==
#	Name of the President	Term	
1.	S. Channaiah	1967	1970
2.	D. Devaraj Urs	1970	1972
3.	K. H. Ranganath	1972	1974
4.	K. H. Patil	1974	Jan 1977
5.	S. B. Nagral	Jan 1977	Jul 1977
1 (from renaming)	K. H. Patil	Jul 1977	1979
2	D. Devaraj Urs	1979	May 1979
3.	S. Bangarappa	May 1979	1980
4.	K. H. Rathod	1980	1983
5.	K. Mallanna	1983	1983
6.	K. H. Patil	1983	1985
7.	K. H. Ranganath	1985	1986
8.	Oscar Fernandes	1986	1987
9.	Janardhana Poojary	1987	1988
10.	Veerendra Patil	1988	1989
(8).	Oscar Fernandes	1989	1992
11.	V. Krishna Rao	1992	1995
12.	D. K. Naiker	1995	1996
13.	Dharam Singh	1996	1999
14.	S. M. Krishna	1999	2000
15.	V. S. Koujalgi	2000	2001
16.	Allum Veerabhadrappa	2001	2003
(9).	Janardhana Poojary	2003	2005
17.	Mallikarjun Kharge	2005	2008
18.	R. V. Deshpande	2008	27 October 2010
19.	G. Parameshwara	27 October 2010	4 July 2018
20.	Dinesh Gundu Rao	4 July 2018	11 March 2020
21.	D. K. Shivakumar	2 July 2020	3 June 2026
22.	B. K. Hariprasad	3 June 2026	Incumbent

== List of Chief Ministers ==
S.no	Name	Portrait	Term		
1.	D. Devaraj Urs		1 November 1973	31 December 1977	7 years, 238 days
1.	D. Devaraj Urs		28 February 1978	7 January 1980	7 years, 238 days
2.	R. Gundu Rao		12 January 1980	10 January 1983	2 years, 363 days
3.	Veerendra Patil		30 November 1989	10 October 1990	193 days
4.	Sarekoppa Bangarappa		17 October 1990	19 November 1992	2 years, 33 days
5.	Veerappa Moily		19 November 1992	11 December 1994	2 years, 22 days
6.	S. M. Krishna		11 October 1999	28 May 2004	4 years, 230 days
7.	Dharam Singh		28 May 2004	3 February 2006	1 year, 251 days
8.	Siddaramaiah		13 May 2013	17 May 2018	8 years, 18 days
8.	Siddaramaiah		20 May 2023	3 June 2026	8 years, 18 days
9.	D. K. Shivakumar		3 June 2026	incumbent	149 days

== Karnataka Indian youth Congress outreach cell ==
1. Dr. Adithiya Gowda
2. Ms.Sheethal Subhas
