= Lalji Moreshwar Pendse =

Indian politician

Lalji Moreshwar Pendse is an Indian politician from Maharashtra. He was a member of Rajya Sabha from Bombay and a leader of the Communist Party of India.

He lost the 1962 Bombay City South Lok Sabha election to Sadashiv Kanoji Patil of the Indian National Congress party.
