= H. Hanumanthappa =

Indian politician (1932–2026)

Member of Parliament, Rajya Sabha
- In office 1982–2000
- Constituency: Karnataka

Personal details
- Born: 13 May 1932
- Died: 12 July 2026 (aged 94)
- Party: Indian National Congress
- Spouse: Kotramma

H. Hanumanthappa (13 May 1932 – 12 July 2026) was an Indian politician. He was a Member of Parliament, representing Karnataka in the Rajya Sabha, the upper house of India's Parliament, as a member of the Indian National Congress.

Hanumanthappa died on 12 July 2026, at the age of 94.
