= J.P. Javali =

Indian Politician (1931-2001)

Member of Rajya Sabha
- In office 3 April 1988 – 2 April 1994

Personal details
- Born: 4 May 1931
- Died: 21 November 2001 (aged 70)
- Party: Janata Dal
- Spouse: Shakuntla J. Javali (1954)
- Children: 3 sons and 1 daughter
- Parent: Padmanabhaiah (father)
- Education: Karnataka College Dharwad, Karnataka

J.P. Javali (4 May 1931 – 21 November 2001) was an Indian politician and Member of Rajya Sabha (the upper house of the Parliament of India) from 1988 to 1994.

== Early life and background ==
Javali was born on 4 May 1931 in Tumkur. Padmanabhaiah was his father. He completed his education from Karnataka College Dharwad, Karnataka.

== Personal life ==
Javali married Shakuntla J. Javali in 1954 and the couple has 3 sons and 1 daughter.

== Position held ==
#	From	To	Position
1	1988	1994	Member of Rajya Sabha (the upper house of the Parliament of India)

== Death ==
J.P. Javali died on 21 November 2001 at the age of 70.
