= B. C. Nanjundaiya =

Indian politician (born 1913)

Mysore Representative Assembly
- In office 1937-1944

Mysore Legislative Assembly
- In office 1948-1957

Rajya Sabha
- In office 25 April 1957 to 2 April 1960

Personal details
- Born: 17 January 1913 (age 112)
- Spouse: Shrimati B. Ambabai
- Children: 3 sons and 4 daughters
- Parent: Shri Bhavikattay Channabasappa (father)

B.C. Nanjundaiya (born 17 January 1913) is an Indian politician and former Member of the upper house of the Indian Parliament, the Rajya Sabha, from the state of Mysore (now Karnataka).

== Personal life ==
B.C. Nanjundaiya was born on 17 January 1913. Shri Bhavikattay Channabasappa was his father.

B.C. Nanjundaiya married Shrimati B. Ambabai and couple has 3 sons and 4 daughters.

== Position held ==
#	From	To	Position
1.	1937	1944	Member of Mysore Representative Assembly.
2.	1948	1957	Member of Mysore Legislative Assembly.
3.	1957	1960	MP (1st term) in Rajya Sabha.
4.	1960	1966	MP (2nd term) in Rajya Sabha.
