= H. R. Basavaraj =

Indian politician (1921 – 1999)

Member of Rajya Sabha
- In office 10-4-1978 – 10-4-1978

Personal details
- Born: 21 January 1921 Hirehal village of Anantapur district.
- Died: 6 April 1999 (aged 78)
- Party: Indian National Congress
- Parent: Hirehal Ramaiah (father)

H. R. Basavaraj (21 January 1921 – 6 April 1999) was an Indian politician and member of Rajya Sabha (the upper house of the Parliament of India) from 1978 to 1980.

== Personal life ==
Basavaraj was born on 21 January 1921 in Hirehal village of Anantapur district. Hirehal Ramaiah was his father. He was SSLC educated.

== Position held ==
#	From	To	Position
1	1978	1980	Member of Rajya Sabha (the upper house of the Parliament of India)

== Death ==
Basavaraj died on 6 April 1999 at the age of 78.
