= K. C. Ramamurthy =

Indian politician

MP of Rajya Sabha for Karnataka
- In office 5 December 2019 – 30 June 2022
- Constituency: Karnataka
- In office 1 July 2016 – 16 October 2019
- Preceded by: Vijay Mallya, Independent
- Constituency: Karnataka

Personal details
- Born: 12 June 1952 (age 73)
- Party: Bharatiya Janata Party (Since 16 October 2019)
- Other political affiliations: Indian National Congress (Till 16 October 2019)
- Spouse: Sabitha Ramamurthy
- Children: 2
- Occupation: Former policeman; chairman of CMR Jnanadhara Trust

K. C. Ramamurthy is the chairman of the CMR Jnanadhara Trust and was a member of the Rajya Sabha from the state of Karnataka, India. He was also a former Inspector General of Police in Bangalore, Karnataka, and Registrar of the Bangalore University between January 2002 and October 2003.

== Early life ==
Ramamurthy is one of twelve children in a large, wealthy and liberal-minded family. His father was Chikka Muniappa Reddy. He is married to Sabitha, with whom he has a daughter and son.

== Career ==
Ramamurthy was an Inspector General of Police As was quite common among senior police officers in Karnataka, he took retirement to concentrate on politics in December 2007, at which time he was Additional Commissioner of Police (Traffic & Security).

Despite not having much interaction with the Indian National Congress (INC), Ramamurthy was elected in 2016 to serve a two-year term as an INC representative in the Rajya Sabha - the upper house of the Parliament of India - by the Legislative Assembly of Karnataka. He had previously expressed a desire to stand as an INC candidate for election to the Lok Sabha in the 2014 Indian general election and had been wooed by the Janata Dal (Secular) party after the INC chose not to select him.

== CMR Jnanadhara Trust ==
The CMR Jnanadhara Trust was established in 1994 with Ramamurthy as chairman and his wife as president. Its origins lie in the National Junior Public School that was established in 1990 in an orchard that then belonged to the Ramamurthy family. It has expanded to operate a wide range of institutions, ranging from a Montessori school, a junior college, as well as institutes of management studies and technology. The umbrella organisation now includes CMR Institute of Technology and CMR University.
