= M. Basavaraju =

Indian politician (1927 - 1994)

Member of Karnataka Legislative Assembly
- In office 1967–1972

Member of Rajya Sabha
- In office 3 April 1980 – 2 April 1986

Personal details
- Born: 1 November 1927
- Died: 10 May 1994 (aged 66)
- Party: Indian National Congress
- Spouse: Shrimati Chikkananjammanni
- Children: 4 sons and 2 daughters.
- Parent: Hasan Muddanna (father)

M. Basavaraju ( 1 November 1927 – 10 May 1994) was an Indian politician of the Indian National Congress. He was also member of Karnataka Legislative Assembly and member of Rajya Sabha (the upper house of the Parliament of India).

== Early life and background ==
M. Basavaraju was born on 1 November 1927 in Gandanahalli of Karnataka. He completed his education from intermediate college of Mysore.

== Personal life ==
M. Basavaraju married Shrimati Chikkananjammanni in 1955. The couple had six children which include 4 sons and 2 daughters.

== Political career ==
Basavaraju stepped into politics and became the member of Karnataka Legislative Assembly (1967 - 1972) and member of Rajya Sabha from 3 April 1980 to 2 April 1986.

== Position held ==
#	From	To	Position
1	1967	1972	Member of Karnataka Legislative Assembly
2	1980	1986	Member of Rajya Sabha (the upper house of the Parliament of India)

== Death ==
Basavaraju died on 10 May 1994 at the age of 66.
