= M Valiulla =

Indian politician (1899 - 1960)

Personal details
- Born: 1899
- Died: 19 December 1960 (aged 60–61)
- Political party: Indian National Congress
- Spouse: Habebunnisa Begum
- Parent: Mohamed Ibrahim Saheb (father)
- Education: B.A., LL.B

Mohamed Valiulla (1899 - 19 December 1960) was an Indian politician. He was a Member of the Mysore Constituent Assembly from 1948 to 1950. He also served as a Member of the Mysore Legislative Assembly from 1950 to 1952 and Member of Rajya Sabha (the upper house of the Parliament of India) twice from 1952 to 1958 and from 1958 to 1960. He was a member of the Indian National Congress.

== Position held ==
#	From	To	Position
1	1948	1950	Member of Mysore Constituent Assembly
2	1950	1952	Member of Mysore Legislative Assembly
3	1952	1958	Member of Parliament - Rajya Sabha
4	1958	1960	Member of Parliament - Rajya Sabha
