= Oscar Fernandes =

Indian politician (1941–2021)

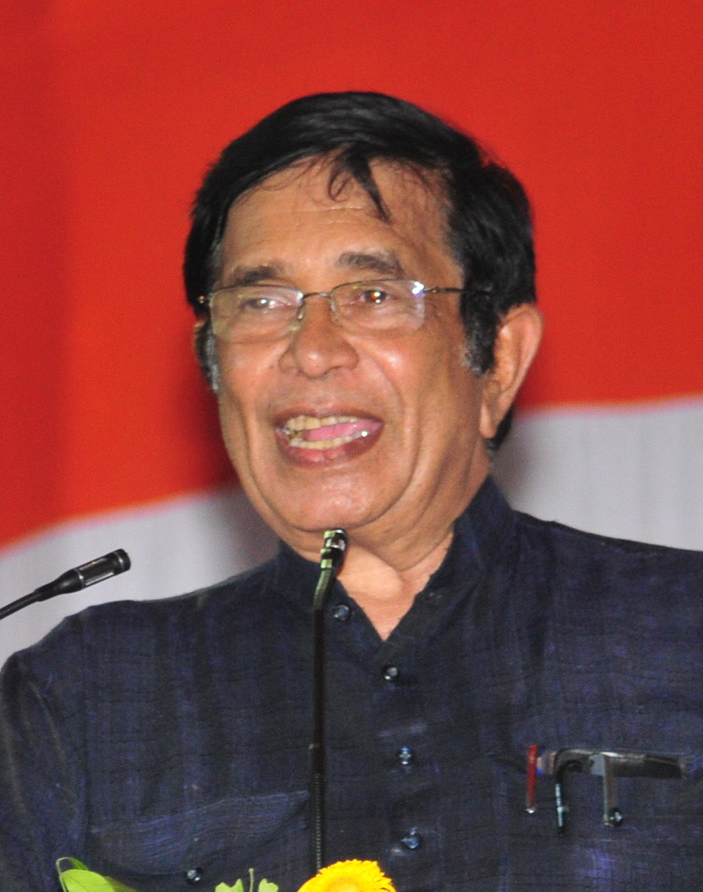
- Fernandes in 2013

Minister of Road Transport and Highways
- In office 17 June 2013 – 26 May 2014
- Prime Minister: Manmohan Singh
- Preceded by: C. P. Joshi; Manmohan Singh (acting)
- Succeeded by: Nitin Gadkari

Minister of Labour and Employment
- In office 15 December 2013 – 26 May 2014
- Prime Minister: Manmohan Singh
- Preceded by: Sis Ram Ola
- Succeeded by: Narendra Singh Tomar
- In office 24 October 2006 – 3 March 2009 (as Minister of State, Independent Charge)
- Preceded by: Manmohan Singh (acting)
- Succeeded by: G. K. Vasan

Minister of State (Independent Charge) of Statistics and Programme Implementation
- In office 23 May 2004 – 29 January 2006
- Preceded by: Atal Bihari Vajpayee
- Succeeded by: G. K. Vasan

Member of Parliament, Rajya Sabha
- In office 1 July 1998 – 13 September 2021
- Succeeded by: Lehar Singh Siroya
- Constituency: Karnataka

Member of Parliament, Lok Sabha
- In office 18 January 1980 – 4 March 1998
- Preceded by: T. A. Pai
- Succeeded by: I. M. Jayarama Shetty
- Constituency: Udupi

Personal details
- Born: 27 March 1941 Udupi, Madras Presidency, British India (now in Karnataka, India)
- Died: 13 September 2021 (aged 80) Mangalore, Karnataka, India
- Party: Indian National Congress
- Spouse: Blossom Fernandes (m. 1981)
- Children: 2

Oscar Fernandes (27 March 1941 – 13 September 2021) was an Indian politician, a senior Indian National Congress leader and was the Union Cabinet Minister for Transport, Road and Highways and Labour and Employment, Government of India in UPA government. He was one of the closest confidants of the former Congress President Rahul Gandhi and one of the major leaders involved in the decision making process related to Congress Party. He was closely associated with the late Mogaveera community leader Mr.Ananda Mendon and both together worked for the social upliftment of rural areas of coastal Karnataka.

== Political life and career ==
Fernandes was the Chairman of Central Election Authority of the All India Congress Committee. He was previously the AICC General Secretary, the Minister of State (Independent charge) of the Ministry of Labour and Employment in Dr. Manmohan Singh's first UPA government in India. He served as Parliamentary Secretary to Rajiv Gandhi.

He was elected to the 7th Lok Sabha in 1980 from Udupi constituency in Karnataka. He was re-elected to the Lok Sabha in 1984, 1989, 1991 and 1996 from the same constituency. Later, he was elected to the Rajya Sabha in 1998. He was re-elected to the Rajya Sabha in 2004. He was a Union Minister from 2004 to 2009, holding a number of portfolios such as Statistics and Programme Implementation, NRI Affairs, Youth and Sports Affairs and Labour and Employment. He served two terms as a member of the Council of the Indian Institute of Science, Bangalore.

Name of Oscar Fernandes is also figured in the National Harold case.

== Personal life ==
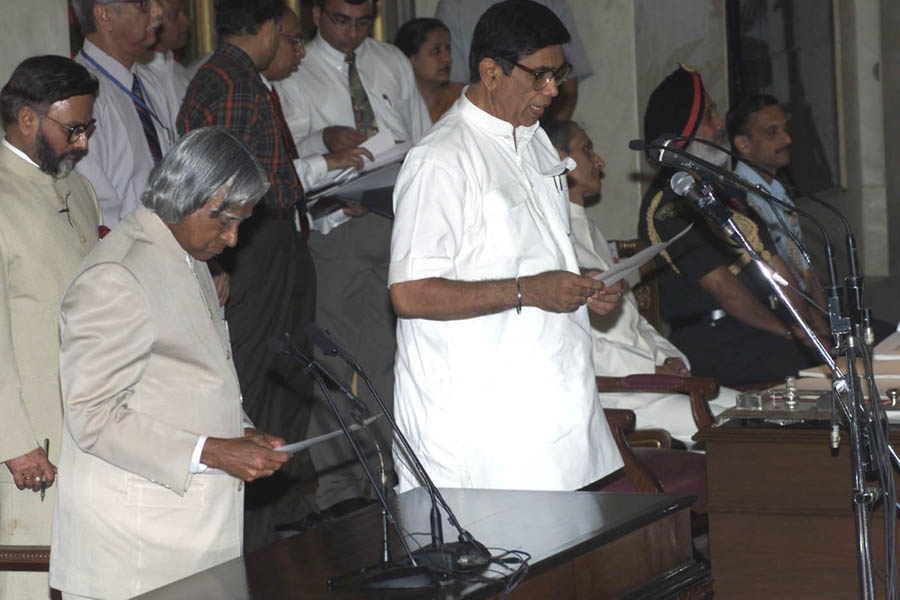
A.P.J. Abdul Kalam, then President of India, administering the oath as Minister of State (Independent Charge) to Fernandes at a Swearing-in Ceremony in New Delhi, May 22, 2004.

Oscar was born to Roque Fernandes, the head of Government Composite PU College and the first President of Manipal Institute of Technology and Leonissa M. Fernandes, the first Women’s Bench Magistrate of undivided Dakshina Kannada district, at the family estate at Udupi. Fernandes was one of 12 children in his family, and grew up with a strong Catholic background. As a child he was an altar boy, and as a youth he was active in Church activities. His family belongs to the Fernandes-Prabhu clan, a Mangalorean Catholic clan from Udyavara in Udupi district. He married Blossom Mathias Prabhu on 26 August 1981 and had one son Oshan and one daughter Oshanie. His son Oshan is married to Frazil Quadros and Oscar's daughter Oshanie is married to Mark Saldanha. In 2002 Fernandes inaugurated the Glowinstar Academy, an integrated development school, in Ambalpady, dedicated to his father, Roque.

== Death ==
Fernandes died on 13 September 2021 at the age of 80, due to age related ailments at Yenepoya hospital in Mangalore. He was undergoing treatment there since 19 July, following a clot in brain due to a fall at his home.

== Election History ==
=== Rajya Sabha ===
Position	Party	Constituency	From	To	Tenure
Member of Parliament, Rajya Sabha (1st Term)	INC	Karnataka	3 April 1998	2 April 2004	5 years, 365 days
Member of Parliament, Rajya Sabha (2nd Term)	INC	Karnataka	1 July 2004	30 June 2010	5 years, 364 days
Member of Parliament, Rajya Sabha (3rd Term)	INC	Karnataka	1 July 2010	30 June 2016	5 years, 365 days
Member of Parliament, Rajya Sabha (4th Term)	INC	Karnataka	1 July 2016	13 September 2021	5 years, 74 days

== Citations ==
Political offices
Preceded by C. P. Joshi	Minister of Road Transport and Highways; 17 June 2013 – 25 May 2014	Succeeded by Nitin Gadkari
