= B. K. Hariprasad =

Indian politician

- Hariprasad in 2026

President of the Karnataka Pradesh Congress Committee
- Incumbent
- Assumed office 3 June 2026
- Preceded by: D. K. Shivakumar

Member of the Karnataka Legislative Council
- Incumbent
- Assumed office 1 July 2020
- Constituency: Elected by members of the Karnataka Legislative Assembly

Leader of the Opposition in the Karnataka Legislative Council
- In office 26 January 2022 – 14 May 2023
- Preceded by: S. R. Patil

AICC in-charge for Haryana
- In office February 2025 – 26 June 2026
- Preceded by: Dipak Babaria
- Succeeded by: Sanjay Dutt

Member of Parliament, Rajya Sabha
- In office 26 June 2014 – 25 June 2020
- Constituency: Karnataka

Member of Parliament, Rajya Sabha
- In office 22 August 2013 – 25 June 2014
- Preceded by: Anil Lad
- Constituency: Karnataka

Member of Parliament, Rajya Sabha
- In office 1 July 2004 – 30 June 2010
- Constituency: Karnataka

Member of Parliament, Rajya Sabha
- In office 10 April 1990 – 9 April 1996
- Constituency: Karnataka

Personal details
- Born: 29 July 1954 (age 72) Bangalore, Mysore State, India
- Party: Indian National Congress
- Spouse: Usha
- Children: 1

B. K. Hariprasad (born 29 July 1954) is an Indian politician of the Indian National Congress. He has served as president of the Karnataka Pradesh Congress Committee (KPCC) since 3 June 2026. He is a member of the Karnataka Legislative Council, to which he was first elected in 2020 and re-elected in June 2026.

Hariprasad previously represented Karnataka for four terms in the Rajya Sabha and served as Leader of the Opposition in the Karnataka Legislative Council from January 2022 to May 2023.

== Early life and education ==
Hariprasad was born on 29 July 1954 in Bangalore. His father was A. Kempaiah. He holds a Bachelor of Commerce degree.

He began his political involvement through student politics and became associated with the Indian National Congress in 1972.

== Political career ==
=== Congress organisation ===
Hariprasad served as General Secretary of the National Students' Union of India from 1979 to 1981 and as Vice-President of the Indian Youth Congress from 1989 to 1990.

He later held several positions in the All India Congress Committee and related organisations. He was Joint Secretary of the AICC from 1997 to 1998, Chairman of the All India Congress Seva Dal from 2000 to 2001, AICC Secretary from 2001 to 2006, and AICC General Secretary from 2006 to 2018.

During his tenure in the AICC, he handled party responsibilities in a number of states and union territories at different times, including Gujarat, Puducherry, Daman and Diu, Goa, Dadra and Nagar Haveli, Haryana, Madhya Pradesh, Chhattisgarh, Jharkhand, Odisha, Bihar, Rajasthan, Punjab, Maharashtra, Himachal Pradesh, Tripura, Manipur and Uttar Pradesh.

In 2023, Hariprasad was named a permanent invitee to the Congress Working Committee.

=== Rajya Sabha ===
Hariprasad represented Karnataka in the Rajya Sabha for four terms: from 10 April 1990 to 9 April 1996, from 1 July 2004 to 30 June 2010, from 22 August 2013 to 25 June 2014, and from 26 June 2014 to 25 June 2020.

During his parliamentary career, he served on committees dealing with health and family welfare, labour and welfare, chemicals and fertilisers, urban and rural development, social justice and empowerment, public accounts and other subjects.

In 2009, Hariprasad participated in proceedings at the United Nations as part of the Indian delegation. In November that year, he responded on behalf of India during a UN discussion in which Pakistan raised the issue of Jammu and Kashmir.

In 2018, Hariprasad was the opposition candidate for Deputy Chairman of the Rajya Sabha. Harivansh Narayan Singh was elected after receiving 125 votes, while Hariprasad received 105.

=== Lok Sabha elections ===
Hariprasad contested the 1999 Indian general election from the Bangalore South Lok Sabha constituency as the Indian National Congress candidate. He finished second to Ananth Kumar of the Bharatiya Janata Party.

He again contested Bangalore South as the Congress candidate in the 2019 Indian general election, when he was defeated by BJP candidate Tejasvi Surya.

=== Karnataka Legislative Council ===
In June 2020, Hariprasad was elected unopposed to the Karnataka Legislative Council along with Congress candidate Naseer Ahmed. He took oath as a member in July 2020.

Hariprasad became Leader of the Opposition in the Legislative Council on 26 January 2022. His tenure ceased with effect from 14 May 2023 following the dissolution of the Council of Ministers headed by then Chief Minister Basavaraj Bommai.

He was re-elected to the Karnataka Legislative Council in the biennial election held on 18 June 2026. Hariprasad was one of five Congress candidates elected to the seven seats contested.

=== AICC in-charge for Haryana ===
Hariprasad was appointed AICC in-charge for Haryana in February 2025. His tenure ended on 26 June 2026 when the Congress appointed Sanjay Dutt as its new in-charge for Haryana.

=== KPCC president ===
On 3 June 2026, Congress president Mallikarjun Kharge appointed Hariprasad president of the Karnataka Pradesh Congress Committee, succeeding D. K. Shivakumar. The Indian National Congress subsequently listed Hariprasad as president of its Karnataka state unit.

== Personal life ==
Hariprasad is married to Usha and they have one daughter.
