= J Venkatappa =

Indian politician (1928 - 2010)

President - Shidlaghatta Town Municipal Council
- Incumbent
- Assumed office 1954
- Incumbent
- Assumed office 1957

Member - Rajya Sabha
- In office 1962–1968

Personal details
- Born: 15 March 1928
- Died: 22 August 2010 (aged 82)
- Spouse: Shrimati Chowdamma

J Venkatappa (15 May 1928 – 22 August 2010) was an Indian politician who served in the Member of Mysore legislative Assembly from 1957 to 1962 and was a Member of Rajya Sabha (the Upper house of the Parliament of India) from 1962 to 1968.

== Early life ==
He was born on 15 May 1928. J. Naranappa was his father. He was person who started Ethihanole project which is currently in progress where he got paramashivaiah to conduct a DPR and submit the report to the government. He donated 5 lakh rupees in 1960 to the government to start the project. Even today people in his constituency remember him for the work he is done.

== Position held ==
#	From	To	Position
1	1954		President - Shidlaghatta Town Municipal Council
2	1957		President - Shidlaghatta Town Municipal Council
3	1957		Member - Legislative Council
4	1962	1968	Member - Rajya Sabha
5	1972	1978	Member - Legislative Assembly.
