= Mulka Govinda Reddy =

Indian politician

Member of Parliament, Rajya Sabha
- In office 1958–1976
- Constituency: Karnataka

Personal details
- Born: 20 September 1915
- Died: 9 December 2013 (aged 97) Bangalore, India
- Party: Indian National Congress
- Other political affiliations: Praja Socialist Party

Mulka Govinda Reddy (1915-2013) was an Indian politician belonging to the Indian National Congress. He was earlier a member of the Praja Socialist Party. He was elected to the Rajya Sabha, upper house of the Parliament of India from Karnataka.

He was a founding member of the India China Friendship Association (ICFA), founded in 1949, and was the first president of ICFA Karnataka.
