= Sanjay Kakade =

Indian politician (born 1967)

Member of Parliament Rajya Sabha
- In office 3 April 2014 – 2 April 2020
- Preceded by: Bharatkumar Raut
- Succeeded by: Bhagwat Karad
- Constituency: Maharashtra

Personal details
- Born: Sanjay Dattatraya Kakade; 29 August 1967 (age 58)
- Party: Bharatiya Janata Party
- Spouse: Usha Kakade
- Profession: Real estate developer, politician

Sanjay Dattatraya Kakade (born 29 August 1967) is a Member of Parliament, representing Maharashtra in the Rajya Sabha the upper house of Indian Parliament. He was elected as an independent candidate but later joined the Bharatiya Janata Party. He is a real estate developer.
