= List of current members of the Rajya Sabha =

List of Members of Parliament

The Parliament of India, a bicameral legislature composed of the Rajya Sabha (Council of States) and the Lok Sabha (House of the People). Membership is limited to 250 members. 238 are elected by the State legislative assemblies, and 12 are nominated by the president of India for their contributions to art, literature, science, and social services. Members sit for overlapping six years terms, with one-third of the members retiring every two years.

== Andhra Pradesh ==
Keys: TDP (4) YSRCP (4) BJP (2) JSP (1)

#	Name	Party	Term start	Term end
1	Bhashyam Rama Krishna	TDP	22-Jun-2026	21-Jun-2032
2	Sana Sathish	TDP	22-Jun-2026	21-Jun-2032
3	Chintakayala Vijay	TDP	22-Jun-2026	21-Jun-2032
4	Beeda Masthan Rao	TDP	13-Dec-2024	21-Jun-2028
5	Y. V. Subba Reddy	YSRCP	03-Apr-2024	02-Apr-2030
6	Meda Raghunadha Reddy	YSRCP	03-Apr-2024	02-Apr-2030
7	Golla Babu Rao	YSRCP	03-Apr-2024	02-Apr-2030
8	S. Niranjan Reddy	YSRCP	22-Jun-2022	21-Jun-2028
9	R. Krishnaiah	BJP	13-Dec-2024	21-Jun-2028
10	Paka Venkata Satyanarayana	BJP	01-May-2025	21-Jun-2028
11	Lingamaneni Ramesh	JSP	22-Jun-2026	21-Jun-2032

== Arunachal Pradesh ==
Keys: BJP (1)

#	Name	Party	Term start	Term end
1	Tai Tagak	BJP	24-Jun-2026	23-Jun-2032

== Assam ==
Keys: BJP (4) UPPL (2) AGP (1)

#	Name	Party	Term start	Term end
1	Jogen Mohan	BJP	10-Apr-2026	09-Apr-2032
2	Terash Gowalla	BJP	10-Apr-2026	09-Apr-2032
3	Kanad Purkayastha	BJP	15-Jun-2025	14-Jun-2031
4	Pabitra Margherita	BJP	03-Apr-2022	02-Apr-2028
5	Pramod Boro	UPPL	10-Apr-2026	09-Apr-2032
6	Rwngwra Narzary	UPPL	03-Apr-2022	02-Apr-2028
7	Birendra Prasad Baishya	AGP	15-Jun-2025	14-Jun-2031

== Bihar ==
Keys: BJP (7) JD(U) (4) RJD (3) RLM (1) INC (1)

#	Name	Party	Term start	Term end
1	Nitin Nabin	BJP	10-Apr-2026	09-Apr-2032
2	Shivesh Kumar	BJP	10-Apr-2026	09-Apr-2032
3	Dharamshila Gupta	BJP	03-Apr-2024	02-Apr-2030
4	Bhim Singh	BJP	03-Apr-2024	02-Apr-2030
5	Satish Chandra Dubey	BJP	08-Jul-2022	07-July-2028
6	Shambhu Sharan Patel	BJP	08-Jul-2022	07-July-2028
7	Manan Kumar Mishra	BJP	28-Aug-2024	07-July-2028
8	Nitish Kumar	JD(U)	10-Apr-2026	09-Apr-2032
9	Ram Nath Thakur	JD(U)	10-Apr-2026	09-Apr-2032
10	Sanjay Kumar Jha	JD(U)	03-Apr-2024	02-Apr-2030
11	Khiru Mahto	JD(U)	08-Jul-2022	07-Jul-2028
12	Manoj Jha	RJD	03-Apr-2024	02-Apr-2030
13	Sanjay Yadav	RJD	03-Apr-2024	02-Apr-2030
14	Faiyaz Ahmad	RJD	08-Jul-2022	07-Jul-2028
15	Upendra Kushwaha	RLM	10-Apr-2026	09-Apr-2032
16	Akhilesh Prasad Singh	INC	03-Apr-2024	02-Apr-2030

== Chhattisgarh ==
Keys: INC (3) BJP (2)

#	Name	Party	Term start	Term end
1	Phulo Devi Netam	INC	10-Apr-2026	09-Apr-2032
2	Ranjeet Ranjan	INC	30-Jun-2022	29-Jun-2028
3	Rajeev Shukla	INC	30-Jun-2022	29-Jun-2028
4	Laxmi Verma	BJP	10-Apr-2026	09-Apr-2032
5	Raja Devendra Pratap Singh	BJP	03-Apr-2024	02-Apr-2030

== Goa ==
Keys: BJP (1)

#	Name	Party	Term start	Term end
1	Sadanand Tanavade	BJP	29-Jul-2023	28-Jul-2029

== Gujarat ==
Keys:

BJP (11)

#	Name	Party	Term start	Term end
1	Rajesh Shukla (politician)	BJP	22-Jun-2026	21-Jun-2032
2	Mukesh Rathwa	BJP	22-Jun-2026	21-Jun-2032
3	Mansingh Parmar	BJP	22-Jun-2026	21-Jun-2032
4	Jitendra Kanjariya	BJP	22-Jun-2026	21-Jun-2032
5	J. P. Nadda	BJP	03-Apr-2024	02-Apr-2030
6	Govind Dholakia	BJP	03-Apr-2024	02-Apr-2030
7	Mayankbhai Nayak	BJP	03-Apr-2024	02-Apr-2030
8	Jasvantsinh Parmar	BJP	03-Apr-2024	02-Apr-2030
9	S. Jaishankar	BJP	19-Aug-2023	18-Aug-2029
10	Kesridevsinh Jhala	BJP	19-Aug-2023	18-Aug-2029
11	Babubhai Desai	BJP	19-Aug-2023	18-Aug-2029

== Haryana ==
Keys: BJP (3) INC (1) IND (1)

#	Name	Party	Term start	Term end
1	Sanjay Bhatia	BJP	10-Apr-2026	09-Apr-2032
2	Subhash Barala	BJP	03-Apr-2024	02-Apr-2030
3	Rekha Sharma	BJP	13-Dec-2024	01-Aug-2028
4	Karamvir Singh Boudh	INC	10-Apr-2026	09-Apr-2032
5	Kartikeya Sharma	IND	02-Aug-2022	01-Aug-2028

== Himachal Pradesh ==
Keys: BJP (2) INC (1)

#	Name	Party	Term start	Term end
1	Harsh Mahajan	BJP	03-Apr-2024	02-Apr-2030
2	Sikander Kumar	BJP	03-Apr-2022	02-Apr-2028
3	Anurag Sharma	INC	10-Apr-2026	09-Apr-2032

== Jharkhand ==
Keys: JMM (3) BJP (2) IND (1)

#	Name	Party	Term start	Term end
1	Baidyanath Ram	JMM	22-Jun-2026	21-Jun-2032
2	Sarfaraz Ahmad	JMM	04-May-2024	03-May-2030
3	Mahua Maji	JMM	08-Jul-2022	07-Jul-2028
4	Pradip Kumar Varma	BJP	04-May-2024	03-May-2030
5	Aditya Sahu	BJP	08-Jul-2022	07-Jul-2028
6	Parimal Nathwani	IND	22-Jun-2026	21-Jun-2032

== Karnataka ==
Keys: INC (7) BJP (5)

#	Name	Party	Term start	Term end
1	Mallikarjun Kharge	INC	26-Jun-2026	25-Jun-2032
2	Pawan Khera	INC	26-Jun-2026	25-Jun-2032
3	Mansoor Ali Khan	INC	26-Jun-2026	25-Jun-2032
4	Ajay Maken	INC	03-Apr-2024	02-Apr-2030
5	G. C. Chandrasekhar	INC	03-Apr-2024	02-Apr-2030
6	Syed Naseer Hussain	INC	03-Apr-2024	02-Apr-2030
7	Jairam Ramesh	INC	01-Jul-2022	30-Jun-2028
8	M. Nagaraja	BJP	26-Jun-2026	25-Jun-2032
9	Narayana Bhandage	BJP	03-Apr-2024	02-Apr-2030
10	Nirmala Sitharaman	BJP	01-Jul-2022	30-Jun-2028
11	Jaggesh	BJP	01-Jul-2022	30-Jun-2028
12	Lehar Singh Siroya	BJP	01-Jul-2022	30-Jun-2028

== Kerala ==
Keys: CPI(M) (3) CPI (2) IUML (2) INC (1) KC(M) (1)

#	Name	Party	Term start	Term end
1	A. A. Rahim	CPI(M)	03-Apr-2022	03-Apr-2028
2	V. Sivadasan	CPI(M)	24-Apr-2021	23-Apr-2027
3	John Brittas	CPI(M)	24-Apr-2021	23-Apr-2027
4	P. P. Suneer	CPI	02-Jul-2024	01-Jul-2030
5	P. Santhosh Kumar	CPI	03-Apr-2022	02-Apr-2028
6	Haris Beeran	IUML	02-Jul-2024	01-Jul-2030
7	P. V. Abdul Wahab	IUML	24-Apr-2021	23-Apr-2027
8	Jose K. Mani	KC(M)	02-Jul-2024	01-Jul-2030
9	Jebi Mather	INC	03-Apr-2022	02-Apr-2028

== Madhya Pradesh ==
Keys: BJP (9) INC (2)

#	Name	Party	Term start	Term end
1	Mahesh Kewat	BJP	22-Jun-2026	21-Jun-2032
2	Rajneesh Agrawal	BJP	22-Jun-2026	21-Jun-2032
3	Tarun Chugh	BJP	22-Jun-2026	21-Jun-2032
4	Maya Naroliya	BJP	03-Apr-2024	02-Apr-2030
5	Umesh Nath Maharaj	BJP	03-Apr-2024	02-Apr-2030
6	Bansilal Gurjar	BJP	03-Apr-2024	02-Apr-2030
7	Hardeep Singh Puri	BJP	05-Nov-2026	02-Apr-2030
8	Sumitra Valmiki	BJP	30-Jun-2022	29-Jun-2028
9	Kavita Patidar	BJP	30-Jun-2022	29-Jun-2028
10	Ashok Singh Yadav	INC	03-Apr-2024	02-Apr-2030
11	Vivek Tankha	INC	30-Jun-2022	29-Jun-2028

== Maharashtra ==
Keys: BJP (7) NCP (4) SHS (2) INC (2) RPI(A) (1) NCP-SP (1) SS(UBT) (1) Vacant (1)

#	Name	Party	Term start	Term end
1	Vinod Tawde	BJP	03-Apr-2026	02-Apr-2032
2	Maya Ivnate	BJP	03-Apr-2026	02-Apr-2032
3	Ashok Chavan	BJP	03-Apr-2024	02-Apr-2030
4	Medha Kulkarni	BJP	03-Apr-2024	02-Apr-2030
5	Ajit Gopchade	BJP	03-Apr-2024	02-Apr-2030
6	Anil Bonde	BJP	05-Jul-2022	04-Jul-2028
7	Dhananjay Mahadik	BJP	05-Jul-2022	04-Jul-2028
8	Parth Pawar	NCP	03-Apr-2026	02-Apr-2032
9	Praful Patel	NCP	03-Apr-2024	02-Apr-2030
10	Nitin Patil	NCP	28-Aug-2024	04-Jul-2028
11	Rajendra Jain	NCP	08-Jun-2026	04-Jul-2028
12	Jyoti Waghmare	SS	03-Apr-2026	02-Apr-2032
13	Milind Deora	SS	03-Apr-2024	02-Apr-2030
14	Chandrakant Handore	INC	03-Apr-2024	02-Apr-2030
15	Imran Pratapgarhi	INC	05-Jul-2022	04-Jul-2028
16	Ramdas Athawale	RPI(A)	03-Apr-2026	02-Apr-2032
17	Sharad Pawar	NCP-SP	03-Apr-2026	02-Apr-2032
18	Sanjay Raut	SS(UBT)	05-Jul-2022	04-Jul-2028
19	Vacant Since 22-Nov-2026			02-Apr-2032

== Manipur ==
Keys: BJP (1)

#	Name	Party	Term start	Term end
1	Adhikarimayum Sharda Devi	BJP	22-Jun-2026	21-Jun-2032

== Meghalaya ==
Keys: NPP (1)

#	Name	Party	Term start	Term end
1	James Sangma	NPP	22-Jun-2026	21-Jun-2032

== Mizoram ==
Keys: ZPM (1)

#	Name	Party	Term start	Term end
1	K Laltluangkima	ZPM	19-Jul-2026	18-Jul-2032

== Nagaland ==
Keys: BJP (1)

#	Name	Party	Term start	Term end
1	Phangnon Konyak	BJP	03-Apr-2022	02-Apr-2028

== Odisha ==
Keys: BJD (5) BJP (4) IND (1)

#	Name	Party	Term start	Term end
1	Santrupt Misra	BJD	03-Apr-2026	02-Apr-2032
2	Subhashish Khuntia	BJD	04-Apr-2024	03-Apr-2030
3	Sasmit Patra	BJD	02-Jul-2022	01-Jul-2028
4	Manas Mangaraj	BJD	02-Jul-2022	01-Jul-2028
5	Sulata Deo	BJD	02-Jul-2022	01-Jul-2028
6	Manmohan Samal	BJP	03-Apr-2026	02-Apr-2032
7	Sujeet Kumar	BJP	03-Apr-2026	02-Apr-2032
8	Ashwini Vaishnaw	BJP	04-Apr-2024	03-Apr-2030
9	Debashish Samantaray	BJP	08-Jun-2026	03-Apr-2030
10	Dilip Ray	IND	03-Apr-2026	02-Apr-2032

== Punjab ==
Keys: BJP (6) AAP (1)

#	Name	Party	Term start	Term end
1	Vikramjit Singh Sahney	BJP	05-Jul-2022	04-Jul-2028
2	Ashok Mittal	BJP	10-Apr-2022	09-Apr-2028
3	Raghav Chadha	BJP	10-Apr-2022	09-Apr-2028
4	Sandeep Pathak	BJP	10-Apr-2022	09-Apr-2028
5	Harbhajan Singh	BJP	10-Apr-2022	09-Apr-2028
6	Rajinder Gupta	BJP	24-Oct-2025	09-Apr-2028
7	Balbir Singh Seechewal	AAP	05-Jul-2022	04-Jul-2028

== Rajasthan ==
Keys: BJP (5) INC (5)

#	Name	Party	Term start	Term end
1	Satish Poonia	BJP	22-Jun-2026	21-Jun-2032
2	Alka Gurjar	BJP	22-Jun-2026	21-Jun-2032
3	Chunnilal Garasiya	BJP	04-Apr-2024	03-Apr-2030
4	Madan Rathore	BJP	04-Apr-2024	03-Apr-2030
5	Ghanshyam Tiwari	BJP	05-Jul-2022	04-Jul-2028
6	Neeraj Dangi	INC	22-Jun-2026	21-Jun-2032
7	Sonia Gandhi	INC	04-Apr-2024	03-Apr-2030
8	Randeep Surjewala	INC	05-Jul-2022	04-Jul-2028
9	Mukul Wasnik	INC	05-Jul-2022	04-Jul-2028
10	Pramod Tiwari	INC	05-Jul-2022	04-Jul-2028

== Sikkim ==
Keys: BJP (1)

#	Name	Party	Term start	Term end
1	Dorjee Tshering Lepcha	BJP	24-Feb-2024	23-Feb-2030

== Tamil Nadu ==
Keys: DMK (8) AIADMK (4) INC (3) PMK (1) DMDK (1) MNM (1)

#	Name	Party	Term start	Term end
1	Tiruchi Siva	DMK	03-Apr-2026	02-Apr-2032
2	Constandine Ravindran	DMK	03-Apr-2026	02-Apr-2032
3	Rajathi	DMK	25-Jul-2025	24-Jul-2031
4	S. R. Sivalingam	DMK	25-Jul-2025	24-Jul-2031
5	P. Wilson	DMK	25-Jul-2025	24-Jul-2031
6	K. R. N. Rajeshkumar	DMK	30-Jun-2022	29-Jun-2028
7	R. Girirajan	DMK	30-Jun-2022	29-Jun-2028
8	S. Kalyanasundaram	DMK	30-Jun-2022	29-Jun-2028
9	M. Thambidurai	AIADMK	03-Apr-2026	02-Apr-2032
10	M. Dhanapal	AIADMK	25-Jul-2025	24-Jul-2031
11	I. S. Inbadurai	AIADMK	25-Jul-2025	24-Jul-2031
12	R. Dharmar	AIADMK	30-Jun-2022	29-Jun-2028
13	Christopher Tilak	INC	03-Apr-2026	02-Apr-2032
14	P. Chidambaram	INC	30-Jun-2022	29-Jun-2028
15	Praveen Chakravarty	INC	08-Jun-2026	29-Jun-2028
16	Anbumani Ramadoss	PMK	03-Apr-2026	02-Apr-2032
17	L.K. Sudhish	DMDK	03-Apr-2026	02-Apr-2032
18	Kamal Haasan	MNM	25-Jul-2025	24-Jul-2031

== Telangana ==
Keys: INC (4) BRS (3)

#	Name	Party	Term start	Term end
1	Vem Narender Reddy	INC	10-Apr-2026	09-Apr-2032
2	Abhishek Singhvi	INC	10-Apr-2026	09-Apr-2032
3	M. Anil Kumar Yadav	INC	03-Apr-2024	02-Apr-2030
4	Renuka Chowdhury	INC	03-Apr-2024	02-Apr-2030
5	Vaddiraju Ravichandra	BRS	03-Apr-2024	02-Apr-2030
6	B. Parthasaradhi Reddy	BRS	22-Jun-2022	21-Jun-2028
7	D. Damodar Rao	BRS	22-Jun-2022	21-Jun-2028

== Tripura ==
Keys: BJP (1)

#	Name	Party	Term start	Term end
1	Rajib Bhattacharjee	BJP	04-Sep-2024	02-Apr-2028

== Uttar Pradesh ==
Keys: BJP (24) SP (5) RLD (1) IND (1)

#	Name	Party	Term start	Term end
1	Dharmpal Singh	BJP	26-Nov-2026	25-Nov-2032
2	Radha Kant Ojha	BJP	26-Nov-2026	25-Nov-2032
3	Prakash Pal	BJP	26-Nov-2026	25-Nov-2032
4	Vidyasagar Sonkar	BJP	26-Nov-2026	25-Nov-2032
5	Gopi Krishna Pandey	BJP	26-Nov-2026	25-Nov-2032
6	Priyanka Singh Rawat	BJP	26-Nov-2026	25-Nov-2032
7	Ram Pratap Singh Chauhan	BJP	26-Nov-2026	25-Nov-2032
8	Shruti Gangwar	BJP	26-Nov-2026	25-Nov-2032
9	Sudhanshu Trivedi	BJP	03-Apr-2024	02-Apr-2030
10	Sanjay Seth	BJP	03-Apr-2024	02-Apr-2030
11	Naveen Jain	BJP	03-Apr-2024	02-Apr-2030
12	Sadhana Singh	BJP	03-Apr-2024	02-Apr-2030
13	Sangeeta Balwant	BJP	03-Apr-2024	02-Apr-2030
14	Ratanjit Pratap Narain Singh	BJP	03-Apr-2024	02-Apr-2030
15	Chaudhary Tejveer Singh	BJP	03-Apr-2024	02-Apr-2030
16	Amarpal Maurya	BJP	03-Apr-2024	02-Apr-2030
17	Laxmikant Bajpai	BJP	05-Jul-2022	04-Jul-2028
18	Radha Mohan Das Agarwal	BJP	05-Jul-2022	04-Jul-2028
19	Surendra Singh Nagar	BJP	05-Jul-2022	04-Jul-2028
20	Sangeeta Yadav	BJP	05-Jul-2022	04-Jul-2028
21	Darshana Singh	BJP	05-Jul-2022	04-Jul-2028
22	Baburam Nishad	BJP	05-Jul-2022	04-Jul-2028
23	K. Laxman	BJP	05-Jul-2022	04-Jul-2028
24	Mithlesh Kumar	BJP	05-Jul-2022	04-Jul-2028
25	Ram Gopal Yadav	SP	26-Nov-2026	25-Nov-2032
26	Dhanraj Nathwani	SP	26-Nov-2026	25-Nov-2032
27	Jaya Bachchan	SP	03-Apr-2024	02-Apr-2030
28	Ramji Lal Suman	SP	03-Apr-2024	02-Apr-2030
29	Javed Ali Khan	SP	05-Jul-2022	04-Jul-2028
30	Jayant Chaudhary	RLD	05-Jul-2022	04-Jul-2028
31	Kapil Sibal	IND	05-Jul-2022	04-Jul-2028

== Uttarakhand ==
Keys: BJP (3)

#	Name	Party	Term start	Term end
1	Dinesh Arya	BJP	26-Nov-2026	25-Nov-2032
2	Mahendra Bhatt	BJP	03-Apr-2024	02-Apr-2030
3	Kalpana Saini	BJP	05-Jul-2022	04-Jul-2028

== West Bengal ==
Keys: MAITC (9) BJP (7)

#	Name	Party	Term start	Term end
1	Babul Supriyo	MAITC	03-Apr-2026	02-Apr-2032
2	Menaka Guruswamy	MAITC	03-Apr-2026	02-Apr-2032
3	Rajeev Kumar	MAITC	03-Apr-2026	02-Apr-2032
4	Sagarika Ghose	MAITC	03-Apr-2024	02-Apr-2030
5	Mamata Bala Thakur	MAITC	03-Apr-2024	02-Apr-2030
6	Nadimul Haque	MAITC	03-Apr-2024	02-Apr-2030
7	Derek O'Brien	MAITC	19-Aug-2023	18-Aug-2029
8	Dola Sen	MAITC	19-Aug-2023	18-Aug-2029
9	Samirul Islam	MAITC	19-Aug-2023	18-Aug-2029
10	Rahul Sinha	BJP	03-Apr-2026	02-Apr-2032
11	Koel Mallick	BJP	10-Oct-2026	2-Apr-2032
12	Samik Bhattacharya	BJP	03-Apr-2024	02-Apr-2030
13	Sushmita Dev	BJP	17-Jul-2026	02-Apr-2030
14	Nagendra Ray	BJP	19-Aug-2023	18-Aug-2029
15	Sukhendu Sekhar Roy	BJP	17-Jul-2026	18-Aug-2029
16	Prakash Chik Baraik	BJP	17-Jul-2026	18-Aug-2029

== Delhi ==
Keys: AAP (2) BJP (1)

#	Name	Party	Term start	Term end
1	Sanjay Singh	AAP	28-Jan-2024	27-Jan-2030
2	Narain Dass Gupta	AAP	28-Jan-2024	27-Jan-2030
3	Swati Maliwal	BJP	28-Jan-2024	27-Jan-2030

== Jammu and Kashmir ==
Keys: JKNC (3) BJP (1)

#	Name	Party	Term start	Term end
1	Sajjad Ahmad Kichloo	JKNC	25-Oct-2025	24-Oct-2031
2	Ch. Mohammad Ramzan	JKNC	25-Oct-2025	24-Oct-2031
3	Gurwinder Singh Oberoi	JKNC	25-Oct-2025	24-Oct-2031
4	Sat Paul Sharma	BJP	25-Oct-2025	24-Oct-2031

== Puducherry ==
Keys: BJP (1)

#	Name	Party	Term start	Term end
1	S. Selvaganapathy	BJP	07-Oct-2021	06-Oct-2027

== Nominated ==
Keys: NOM (7) BJP (5)

#	Name	Field	Party	Term start	Term end
1	Harivansh Narayan Singh	Journalism	NOM	10-Apr-2026	09-Apr-2032
2	Meenakshi Jain	Literature and Education	NOM	13-Jul-2025	12-Jul-2031
3	Sudha Murty	Social work and Education	NOM	08-Mar-2024	07-Mar-2030
4	Veerendra Heggade	Social work	NOM	07-Jul-2022	06-Jul-2028
5	Ilaiyaraaja	Art	NOM	07-Jul-2022	06-Jul-2028
6	V. Vijayendra Prasad	Art	NOM	07-Jul-2022	06-Jul-2028
7	P. T. Usha	Sports	NOM	07-Jul-2022	06-Jul-2028
8	Harsh Vardhan Shringla	Diplomacy	BJP	13-Jul-2025	12-Jul-2031
9	Ujjwal Nikam	Law	BJP	13-Jul-2025	12-Jul-2031
10	C. Sadanandan Master	Social work	BJP	13-Jul-2025	12-Jul-2031
11	Satnam Singh Sandhu	Education	BJP	30-Jan-2024	29-Jan-2030
12	Ghulam Ali Khatana	Social work	BJP	14-Sep-2022	13-Sep-2028

== Party position ==
Number of members of parliament by party-wise and their floor leaders (As on 22 November 2026):

Alliance	Political party	No. of MPs	Floor leader of the party
Government; NDA; Seats: 153	Bharatiya Janata Party	118	Jagat Prakash Nadda (Leader of the House)
Government; NDA; Seats: 153	All India Anna Dravida Munnetra Kazhagam	4	M. Thambi Durai
Government; NDA; Seats: 153	Janata Dal (United)	4	Sanjay Kumar Jha
Government; NDA; Seats: 153	Nationalist Congress Party	4	Praful Patel
Government; NDA; Seats: 153	Telugu Desam Party	4	Sana Sathish Babu
Government; NDA; Seats: 153	Shiv Sena	2	Milind Murli Deora
Government; NDA; Seats: 153	Asom Gana Parishad	1	Birendra Prasad Baishya
Government; NDA; Seats: 153	Janasena Party	1	Lingamaneni Ramesh
Government; NDA; Seats: 153	National People's Party	1	James Sangma
Government; NDA; Seats: 153	Pattali Makkal Katchi	1	Anbumani Ramadoss
Government; NDA; Seats: 153	Rashtriya Lok Dal	1	Jayant Chaudhary
Government; NDA; Seats: 153	Rashtriya Lok Morcha	1	Upendra Kushwaha
Government; NDA; Seats: 153	Republican Party of India (Athawale)	1	Ramdas Bandu Athawale
Government; NDA; Seats: 153	Nominated	7	Steady
Government; NDA; Seats: 153	Independent	3	Steady
Opposition; INDIA; Seats: 64	Indian National Congress	30	Mallikarjun Kharge (Leader of the Opposition)
Opposition; INDIA; Seats: 64	Mamata All India Trinamool Congress	9	Derek O'Brien
Opposition; INDIA; Seats: 64	Samajwadi Party	5	Ram Gopal Yadav
Opposition; INDIA; Seats: 64	Communist Party of India (Marxist)	3	John Brittas
Opposition; INDIA; Seats: 64	Jammu & Kashmir National Conference	3	Chowdry Mohammad Ramzan
Opposition; INDIA; Seats: 64	Jharkhand Mukti Morcha	3	Sarfaraz Ahmad
Opposition; INDIA; Seats: 64	Rashtriya Janata Dal	3	Faiyaz Ahmad
Opposition; INDIA; Seats: 64	Communist Party of India	2	P. Sandosh Kumar
Opposition; INDIA; Seats: 64	Indian Union Muslim League	2	Abdul Wahab
Opposition; INDIA; Seats: 64	Nationalist Congress Party – Sharadchandra Pawar	1	Sharadchandra Pawar
Opposition; INDIA; Seats: 64	Shiv Sena (Uddhav Balasaheb Thackeray)	1	Sanjay Raut
Opposition; INDIA; Seats: 64	Kerala Congress (M)	1	Jose K. Mani
Opposition; INDIA; Seats: 64	Independent	1	Steady
Others; Seats: 28	Dravida Munnetra Kazhagam	8	Tiruchi Siva
Others; Seats: 28	Biju Janata Dal	5	Manas Ranjan Mangaraj
Others; Seats: 28	Yuvajana Sramika Rythu Congress Party	4	Y. V. Subba Reddy
Others; Seats: 28	Aam Aadmi Party	3	Sanjay Singh
Others; Seats: 28	Bharat Rashtra Samithi	3	Ravi Chandra Vaddiraju
Others; Seats: 28	United People's Party, Liberal	2	Rwngwra Narzary
Others; Seats: 28	Desiya Murpokku Dravida Kazhagam	1	L. K. Sudhish
Others; Seats: 28	Makkal Needhi Maiam	1	Kamal Haasan
Others; Seats: 28	Zoram People's Movement	1	K. Laltluangkima
Total		245	

== See also ==
- List of current members of the (18th) Lok Sabha
- List of Rajya Sabha elections
- Member of Parliament, Rajya Sabha
