= 2024 Rajya Sabha elections =

Elections for the upper house of Indian Parliament

- January – December 2024

84 (Note: Including 19 casual vacancies) of the 233 (Note: excluding 12 nominated seats) elected seats in the Rajya Sabha 119 (Note: out of 237 (excluding 8 vacancies and including 12 nominated seats)) total seats needed for a majority
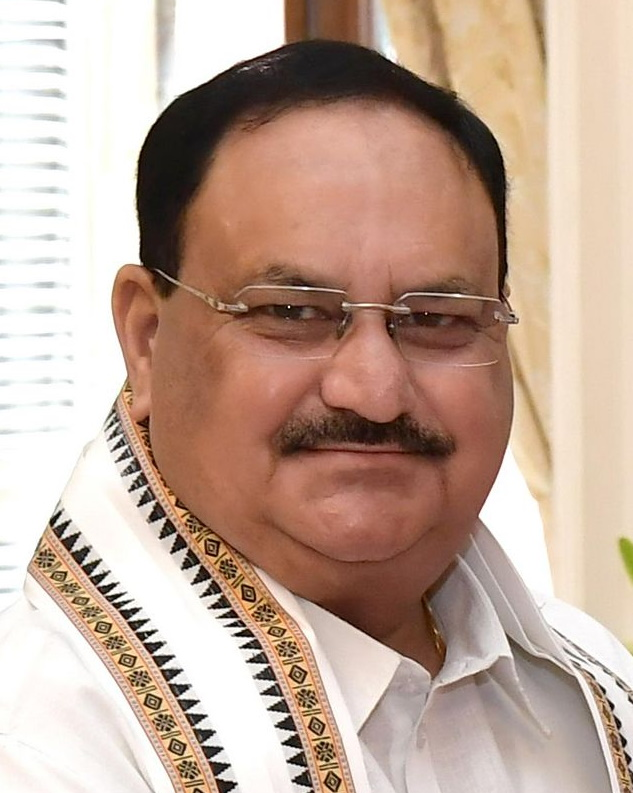

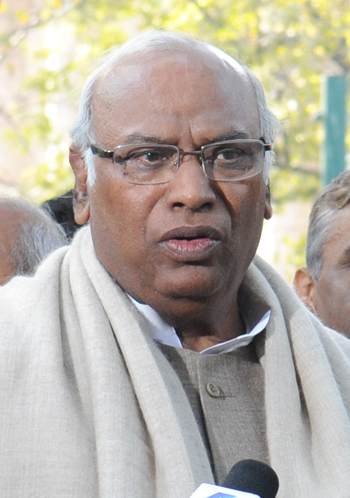
	First party	Second party
Leader	J. P. Nadda	Mallikarjun Kharge
Party	BJP	INC
Alliance	NDA	INDIA
Leader since	24 June 2024	16 February 2021
Seats before	89 (Note: excluding 5 nominated members)	30
Seats after	96 (Note: excluding 2 nominated members)	27
Seat change	▲7	▼3
Alliance seats before	106 (Note: excluding 10 nominated members)	91
Alliance seats after	117 (Note: excluding 8 nominated members)	87
Seat change	▲11	▼4
Majority before election
None
Majority after
election
National Democratic Alliance (Note: including the support of 8 nominated members)

The 2024 Rajya Sabha elections were held as part of a routine six-year cycle of the upper house of the Parliament of India from January to December 2024, to elect 65 of its 245 members and 19 bye elections, of which the states through their legislators elect 233, and the remaining 12 are appointed by the President.

National Democratic Alliance secured majority in the Rajya Sabha for the first time since it assumed office in 2014, after winning 11 of the 12 bypolls held in August 2024.

== Electoral system ==
MPs are elected through indirect election by the members of the State legislative assemblies using the system of proportional representation by means of the single transferable vote. Each voter (MLA) ranks candidates in the order of preference (marking 1, 2, 3 and so on) under an open ballot system. Candidate have to reach a specific quota of votes in order to win a seat.

$\text{Quota} = \left( \frac{\text{Total valid votes}}{\text{Vacancies} + 1} \right) + 1$

For a single-seat election, each ballot is valued at one. When multiple seats are filled, the ballot value is set to one hundred.

A candidate is elected unopposed when the number of candidates matches the number of available seats after nominations and withdrawals period.

== Results ==
Alliance/ Party			Seats	+/–			
Alliance/ Party				NDA	Bharatiya Janata Party	44	+7
Nationalist Congress Party	3	+2		NDA			
Telugu Desam Party	2	+1		NDA			
Janata Dal (United)	1	-1		NDA			
Rashtriya Lok Morcha	1	+1		NDA			
Shiv Sena	1	+1		NDA			
Total	52	+11		NDA			
INDIA		Indian National Congress	10	-3			
INDIA		All India Trinamool Congress	5	0			
INDIA		Aam Aadmi Party	3	0			
INDIA		Indian Union Muslim League	2	+1			
INDIA		Rashtriya Janata Dal	2	-1			
INDIA		Samajwadi Party	2	+1			
INDIA		Communist Party of India	1	0			
INDIA		Jharkhand Mukti Morcha	1	+1			
INDIA		Shiv Sena (Uddhav Balasaheb Thackeray)	0	-1			
INDIA		Nationalist Congress Party – Sharadchandra Pawar	0	-1			
INDIA		Communist Party of India (Marxist)	0	-1			
INDIA	Total		26	-4			
Others		Yuvajana Sramika Rythu Congress Party	3	-1			
Others		Biju Janata Dal	2	-2			
Others		Bharat Rashtra Samithi	1	-3			
Others		Sikkim Democratic Front	0	-1			

== Members retiring and elected ==
=== January Election ===
==== Delhi ====
#	Previous MP	Party	Term end	Elected MP	Party	Term start
1	Sanjay Singh	AAP	27-Jan-2024	Sanjay Singh	AAP	28-Jan-2024
2	N. D. Gupta	AAP	27-Jan-2024	N. D. Gupta	AAP	28-Jan-2024
3	Sushil Gupta	AAP	27-Jan-2024	Swati Maliwal	AAP	28-Jan-2024

==== Sikkim ====
#	Previous MP	Party	Term end	Elected MP	Party	Term start
1	Hishey Lachungpa	SDF	23-Feb-2024	Dorjee Tshering Lepcha	BJP	24-Feb-2024

=== March Election ===
==== Andhra Pradesh ====
#	Previous MP	Party	Term end	Elected MP	Party	Term start
1	Vemireddy Prabhakar Reddy	YSRCP	02-Apr-2024	Y. V. Subba Reddy	YSRCP	03-Apr-2024
2	C. M. Ramesh	BJP	02-Apr-2024	Meda Raghunadha Reddy	YSRCP	03-Apr-2024
3	Kanakamedala Ravindra Kumar	TDP	02-Apr-2024	Golla Babu Rao	YSRCP	03-Apr-2024

==== Bihar ====
#	Previous MP	Party	Term end	Elected MP	Party	Term start
1	Sushil Modi	BJP	02-Apr-2024	Dharamshila Gupta	BJP	03-Apr-2024
2	Anil Hegde	JD(U)	02-Apr-2024	Bhim Singh	BJP	03-Apr-2024
3	Bashistha Narain Singh	JD(U)	02-Apr-2024	Sanjay Kumar Jha	JD(U)	03-Apr-2024
4	Akhilesh Prasad Singh	INC	02-Apr-2024	Akhilesh Prasad Singh	INC	03-Apr-2024
5	Ashfaque Karim	RJD	02-Apr-2024	Sanjay Yadav	RJD	03-Apr-2024
6	Manoj Jha	RJD	02-Apr-2024	Manoj Jha	RJD	03-Apr-2024

==== Chhattisgarh ====
#	Previous MP	Party	Term end	Elected MP	Party	Term start
1	Saroj Pandey	BJP	02-Apr-2024	Devendra Pratap Singh	BJP	03-Apr-2024

==== Gujarat ====
#	Previous MP	Party	Term end	Elected MP	Party	Term start
1	Parshottam Rupala	BJP	02-Apr-2024	J. P. Nadda	BJP	03-Apr-2024
2	Mansukh Mandaviya	BJP	02-Apr-2024	Govind Dholakia	BJP	03-Apr-2024
3	Amee Yajnik	INC	02-Apr-2024	Mayankbhai Nayak	BJP	03-Apr-2024
4	Naranbhai Rathwa	INC	02-Apr-2024	Jasvantsinh Parmar	BJP	03-Apr-2024

==== Haryana ====
#	Previous MP	Party	Term end	Elected MP	Party	Term start
1	D. P. Vats	BJP	02-Apr-2024	Subhash Barala	BJP	03-Apr-2024

==== Himachal Pradesh ====
#	Previous MP	Party	Term end	Elected MP	Party	Term start
1	J. P. Nadda	BJP	02-Apr-2024	Harsh Mahajan	BJP	03-Apr-2024

==== Karnataka ====
#	Previous MP	Party	Term end	Elected MP	Party	Term start
1	Syed Naseer Hussain	INC	02-Apr-2024	Syed Naseer Hussain	INC	03-Apr-2024
2	L. Hanumanthaiah	INC	02-Apr-2024	Ajay Maken	INC	03-Apr-2024
3	G. C. Chandrasekhar	INC	02-Apr-2024	G. C. Chandrasekhar	INC	03-Apr-2024
4	Rajeev Chandrasekhar	BJP	02-Apr-2024	Narayana Bhandage	BJP	03-Apr-2024

==== Madhya Pradesh ====
#	Previous MP	Party	Term end	Elected MP	Party	Term start
1	L. Murugan	BJP	02-Apr-2024	L. Murugan	BJP	03-Apr-2024
2	Dharmendra Pradhan	BJP	02-Apr-2024	Umesh Nath Maharaj	BJP	03-Apr-2024
3	Kailash Soni	BJP	02-Apr-2024	Maya Naroliya	BJP	03-Apr-2024
4	Ajay Pratap Singh	BJP	02-Apr-2024	Bansilal Gurjar	BJP	03-Apr-2024
5	Rajmani Patel	INC	02-Apr-2024	Ashok Singh	INC	03-Apr-2024

==== Maharashtra ====
#	Previous MP	Party	Term end	Elected MP	Party	Term start
1	Prakash Javadekar	BJP	02-Apr-2024	Medha Kulkarni	BJP	03-Apr-2024
2	Narayan Rane	BJP	02-Apr-2024	Ajit Gopchade	BJP	03-Apr-2024
3	V. Muraleedharan	BJP	02-Apr-2024	Ashok Chavan	BJP	03-Apr-2024
4	Anil Desai	SS(UBT)	02-Apr-2024	Milind Deora	SHS	03-Apr-2024
5	Vandana Chavan	NCP(SP)	02-Apr-2024	Praful Patel	NCP	03-Apr-2024
6	Kumar Ketkar	INC	02-Apr-2024	Chandrakant Handore	INC	03-Apr-2024

==== Telangana ====
#	Previous MP	Party	Term end	Elected MP	Party	Term start
1	Badulgula Lingaiah Yadav	TRS	02-Apr-2024	Renuka Chowdhury	INC	03-Apr-2024
2	Joginapally Santosh Kumar	TRS	02-Apr-2024	M. Anil Kumar Yadav	INC	03-Apr-2024
3	Vaddiraju Ravi Chandra	TRS	02-Apr-2024	Vaddiraju Ravi Chandra	BRS	03-Apr-2024

==== Uttar Pradesh ====
#	Previous MP	Party	Term end	Elected MP	Party	Term start
1	Sudhanshu Trivedi	BJP	02-Apr-2024	Sudhanshu Trivedi	BJP	03-Apr-2024
2	Kanta Kardam	BJP	02-Apr-2024	Ratanjit Pratap Narain Singh	BJP	03-Apr-2024
3	Ashok Bajpai	BJP	02-Apr-2024	Chaudhary Tejveer Singh	BJP	03-Apr-2024
4	Harnath Singh Yadav	BJP	02-Apr-2024	Sadhana Singh	BJP	03-Apr-2024
5	Anil Agrawal	BJP	02-Apr-2024	Amarpal Maurya	BJP	03-Apr-2024
6	Sakal Deep Rajbhar	BJP	02-Apr-2024	Sangeeta Balwant	BJP	03-Apr-2024
7	Anil Jain	BJP	02-Apr-2024	Naveen Jain	BJP	03-Apr-2024
8	G. V. L. Narasimha Rao	BJP	02-Apr-2024	Sanjay Seth	BJP	03-Apr-2024
9	Vijaypal Singh Tomar	BJP	02-Apr-2024	Ramji Lal Suman	SP	03-Apr-2024
10	Jaya Bachchan	SP	02-Apr-2024	Jaya Bachchan	SP	03-Apr-2024

==== Uttarakhand ====
#	Previous MP	Party	Term end	Elected MP	Party	Term start
1	Anil Baluni	BJP	02-Apr-2024	Mahendra Bhatt	BJP	03-Apr-2024

==== West Bengal ====
#	Previous MP	Party	Term end	Elected MP	Party	Term start
1	Nadimul Haque	TMC	02-Apr-2024	Nadimul Haque	TMC	03-Apr-2024
2	Subhasish Chakraborty	TMC	02-Apr-2024	Mamata Bala Thakur	TMC	03-Apr-2024
3	Abir Biswas	TMC	02-Apr-2024	Sagarika Ghose	TMC	03-Apr-2024
4	Santunu Sen	TMC	02-Apr-2024	Sushmita Dev	TMC	03-Apr-2024
5	Abhishek Singhvi	INC	02-Apr-2024	Samik Bhattacharya	BJP	03-Apr-2024

==== Odisha ====
#	Previous MP	Party	Term end	Elected MP	Party	Term start
1	Amar Patnaik	BJD	03-Apr-2024	Debashish Samantaray	BJD	04-Apr-2024
2	Prashanta Nanda	BJD	03-Apr-2024	Subhashish Khuntia	BJD	04-Apr-2024
3	Ashwini Vaishnaw	BJP	03-Apr-2024	Ashwini Vaishnaw	BJP	04-Apr-2024

==== Rajasthan ====
#	Previous MP	Party	Term end	Elected MP	Party	Term start
1	Manmohan Singh	INC	03-Apr-2024	Sonia Gandhi	INC	04-Apr-2024
2	Bhupender Yadav	BJP	03-Apr-2024	Chunnilal Garasiya	BJP	04-Apr-2024
3	Vacant (Kirodi Lal Meena)			Madan Rathore	BJP	04-Apr-2024

==== Jharkhand ====
#	Previous MP	Party	Term end	Elected MP	Party	Term start
1	Sameer Oraon	BJP	03-May-2024	Pradeep Verma	BJP	04-May-2024
2	Dhiraj Prasad Sahu	INC	03-May-2024	Sarfaraz Ahmad	JMM	04-May-2024

=== June election ===
==== Kerala ====
#	Previous MP	Party	Term end	Elected MP	Party	Term start
1	Binoy Viswam	CPI	01-Jul-2024	P. P. Suneer	CPI	02-Jul-2024
2	Jose K. Mani	KCM	01-Jul-2024	Jose K. Mani	KCM	02-Jul-2024
3	Elamaram Kareem	CPI(M)	01-Jul-2024	Haris Beeran	IUML	02-Jul-2024

== Nominations ==
#	Nominated MP	Affiliation	Field	Term start	Nominated by
1	Satnam Singh Sandhu	BJP	Education	31-Jan-2024	Droupadi Murmu
2	Sudha Murty	NOM	Social work and Education	08-Mar-2024	Droupadi Murmu

== By-elections ==
=== Andhra Pradesh ===
#	Previous MP	Party	Vacancy date	Elected MP	Party	Term start	Term end	Reason for Vacancy
1	Mopidevi Venkataramana	YSRCP	29-Aug-2024	Sana Satish	TDP	13-Dec-2024	21-Jun-2026	Resignation
2	R. Krishnaiah	YSRCP	29-Aug-2024	R. Krishnaiah	BJP	13-Dec-2024	21-Jun-2028	Resignation
2	Beeda Masthan Rao	YSRCP	29-Aug-2024	Beeda Masthan Rao	TDP	13-Dec-2024	21-Jun-2028	Resignation

=== Assam ===
#	Previous MP	Party	Vacancy date	Elected MP	Party	Term start	Term end	Reason for Vacancy
1	Kamakhya Prasad Tasa	BJP	05-Jun-2024	Mission Ranjan Das	BJP	28-Aug-2024	14-Jun-2025	Elected to 18th Lok Sabha
2	Sarbananda Sonowal	BJP	05-Jun-2024	Rameswar Teli	BJP	28-Aug-2024	09-Apr-2026	Elected to 18th Lok Sabha

=== Bihar ===
#	Previous MP	Party	Vacancy date	Elected MP	Party	Term start	Term end	Reason for Vacancy
1	Vivek Thakur	BJP	05-Jun-2024	Upendra Kushwaha	RLM	28-Aug-2024	09-Apr-2026	Elected to 18th Lok Sabha
2	Misa Bharti	RJD	05-Jun-2024	Manan Kumar Mishra	BJP	28-Aug-2024	07-Jul-2028	Elected to 18th Lok Sabha

=== Haryana ===
#	Previous MP	Party	Vacancy date	Elected MP	Party	Term start	Term end	Reason for Vacancy
1	Deepender Singh Hooda	INC	05-Jun-2024	Kiran Chaudhary	BJP	28-Aug-2024	09-Apr-2026	Elected to 18th Lok Sabha
2	Krishan Lal Panwar	BJP	15-Oct-2024	Rekha Sharma	BJP	13-Dec-2024	01-Aug-2028	Elected to 15th Haryana Assembly

=== Madhya Pradesh ===
#	Previous MP	Party	Vacancy date	Elected MP	Party	Term start	Term end	Reason for Vacancy
1	Jyotiraditya Scindia	BJP	05-Jun-2024	George Kurian	BJP	28-Aug-2024	21-Jun-2026	Elected to 18th Lok Sabha

=== Maharashtra ===
#	Previous MP	Party	Vacancy date	Elected MP	Party	Term start	Term end	Reason for Vacancy
1	Praful Patel	NCP	27-Feb-2024	Sunetra Pawar	NCP	21-Jun-2024	04-Jul-2028	Resignation
2	Udayanraje Bhosale	BJP	05-Jun-2024	Dhairyashil Patil	BJP	28-Aug-2024	02-Apr-2026	Elected to 18th Lok Sabha
3	Piyush Goyal	BJP	05-Jun-2024	Nitin Patil	NCP	28-Aug-2024	04-Jul-2028	Elected to 18th Lok Sabha

=== Odisha ===
#	Previous MP	Party	Vacancy date	Elected MP	Party	Term start	Term end	Reason for Vacancy
1	Mamata Mohanta	BJD	31-Jul-2024	Mamata Mohanta	BJP	28-Aug-2024	02-Apr-2026	Resignation
2	Sujeet Kumar	BJD	06-Sep-2024	Sujeet Kumar	BJP	13-Dec-2024	02-Apr-2026	Resignation

=== Rajasthan ===
#	Previous MP	Party	Vacancy date	Elected MP	Party	Term start	Term end	Reason for Vacancy
1	K. C. Venugopal	INC	05-Jun-2024	Ravneet Singh Bittu	BJP	28-Aug-2024	21-Jun-2026	Elected to 18th Lok Sabha

=== Telangana ===
#	Previous MP	Party	Vacancy date	Elected MP	Party	Term start	Term end	Reason for Vacancy
1	K. Keshava Rao	BRS	05-Jul-2024	Abhishek Manu Singhvi	INC	28-Aug-2024	09-Apr-2026	Resignation

=== Tripura ===
#	Previous MP	Party	Vacancy date	Elected MP	Party	Term start	Term end	Reason for Vacancy
1	Biplab Kumar Deb	BJP	05-Jun-2024	Rajib Bhattacharjee	BJP	27-Aug-2024	02-Apr-2028	Elected to 18th Lok Sabha

=== West Bengal ===
#	Previous MP	Party	Vacancy date	Elected MP	Party	Term start	Term end	Reason for Vacancy
1	Jawhar Sircar	AITC	08-Sep-2024	Ritabrata Banerjee	AITC	13-Dec-2024	02-Apr-2026	Resignation

== See also ==
- List of current members of the Rajya Sabha
- 2024 elections in India
- 2024 Indian general election
