= List of Rajya Sabha members from Madhya Pradesh =

The list of current and past Rajya Sabha members from the Madhya Pradesh State. The state elects 11 member for a term of six years and these members indirectly elected by the state legislators of Madhya Pradesh using single transferable votes. Members sit for staggered six-year terms, with one third of the members retiring every two years.

== History of Rajya Sabha seats ==
Earlier, since 1952, there were 12 seats from Madhya Pradesh, 6 seats from Madhya Bharat, 4 seats from Vindhya Pradesh state and 1 seat from Bhopal State to Rajya Sabha. After Constitution (Seventh Amendment) Act, 1956, there were 16 seats from Madhya Pradesh. After the Madhya Pradesh Reorganisation Act, 2000, 5 seats are allocated to Chhattisgarh state from Madhya Pradesh State, reducing its seats from 16 to 11 seats, since 15 November 2000.

== Current members ==
Keys: BJP (9) INC (2)

Name	Party	Term start	Term end
Rajneesh Agrawal	BJP	22-Jun-2026	21-Jun-2032
Mahesh Kewat	BJP	22-Jun-2026	21-Jun-2032
Tarun Chugh	BJP	22-Jun-2026	21-Jun-2032
Umesh Nath Maharaj	BJP	03-Apr-2024	02-Apr-2030
Bansilal Gurjar	BJP	03-Apr-2024	02-Apr-2030
Hardeep Singh Puri	BJP	05-Nov-2026	02-Apr-2030
Maya Naroliya	BJP	03-Apr-2024	02-Apr-2030
Kavita Patidar	BJP	30-Jun-2022	29-Jun-2028
Sumitra Balmik	BJP	30-Jun-2022	29-Jun-2028
Ashok Singh	INC	03-Apr-2024	02-Apr-2030
Vivek Tankha	INC	30-Jun-2022	29-Jun-2028

== List of Rajya Sabha Members from Madhya Pradesh State ==
Chronological list by last date of appointment

- * represents current members

Name	Party	Term start	Term end	Term	Notes
Hardeep Singh Puri	BJP	05-Nov-2026	02-Apr-2030	1	bye-resignation of L. Murugan
Rajneesh Agrawal	BJP	22-Jun-2026	21-Jun-2032	1	
Mahesh Kewat	BJP	22-Jun-2026	21-Jun-2032	1	
Tarun Chugh	BJP	22-Jun-2026	21-Jun-2032	1	
L. Murugan	BJP	03-Apr-2024	05-Nov-2026	2	Resigned
Umesh Nath Maharaj	BJP	03-Apr-2024	02-Apr-2030	1	
Maya Naroliya	BJP	03-Apr-2024	02-Apr-2030	1	
Bansilal Gurjar	BJP	03-Apr-2024	02-Apr-2030	1	
Ashok Singh	INC	03-Apr-2024	02-Apr-2030	1	
Kavita Patidar	BJP	30-Jun-2022	29-Jun-2028	1	
Sumitra Valmiki	BJP	30-Jun-2022	29-Jun-2028	1	
Vivek Tankha	INC	30-Jun-2022	29-Jun-2028	2	
George Kurian	BJP	03-Sep-2024	21-Jun-2026	1	bye- resignation of Jyotiraditya Scindia
Sumer Singh Solanki	BJP	22-Jun-2020	21-Jun-2026	1	
Digvijay Singh	INC	22-Jun-2020	21-Jun-2026	2	
L. Murugan	BJP	27-Sep-2021	02-Apr-2024	1	bye - resignation of Thawar Chand Gehlot
Jyotiraditya Scindia	BJP	22-Jun-2020	04-Jun-2024	1	elected to Guna Lok Sabha
Thawar Chand Gehlot	BJP	03-Apr-2018	07-Jul-2021	2	appointed as Governor of Karnataka
Dharmendra Pradhan	BJP	03-Apr-2018	02-Apr-2024	1	
Ajay Pratap Singh	BJP	03-Apr-2018	02-Apr-2024	1	
Kailash Soni	BJP	03-Apr-2018	02-Apr-2024	1	
Rajmani Patel	INC	03-Apr-2018	02-Apr-2024	1	
Sampatiya Uike	BJP	01-Aug-2017	29-Jun-2022	1	bye - death of Anil Madhav Dave
Anil Madhav Dave	BJP	30-Jun-2016	18-May-2017	3	expired
M. J. Akbar	BJP	30-Jun-2016	29-Jun-2022	1	
Vivek Tankha	INC	30-Jun-2016	29-Jun-2022	1	
La. Ganesan	BJP	07-Oct-2016	02-Apr-2018	1	bye - resignation of Najma Heptulla
Meghraj Jain	BJP	15-Sep-2014	02-Apr-2018	2	bye - resignation of Kaptan Singh Solanki
Prakash Javadekar	BJP	13-Jun-2014	02-Apr-2018	1	bye - resignation of Faggan Singh Kulaste
Prabhat Jha	BJP	10-Apr-2014	09-Apr-2020	2	
Satyanarayan Jatiya	BJP	10-Apr-2014	09-Apr-2020	1	
Digvijay Singh	INC	10-Apr-2014	09-Apr-2020	1	
Kaptan Singh Solanki	BJP	03-Apr-2012	27-Jul-2014	2	appointed as Governor of Haryana
Thawar Chand Gehlot	BJP	03-Apr-2012	02-Apr-2018	1	
Faggan Singh Kulaste	BJP	03-Apr-2012	16-May-2014	1	elected to Mandla Lok Sabha
Najma Heptulla	BJP	03-Apr-2012	17-Aug-2016	1	appointed as Governor of Manipur
Satyavrat Chaturvedi	INC	03-Apr-2012	02-Apr-2018	2	
Meghraj Jain	BJP	06-May-2011	02-Apr-2012	1	bye - death of Arjun Singh
Anil Madhav Dave	BJP	30-Jun-2010	29-Jun-2016	2	
Chandan Mitra	BJP	30-Jun-2010	29-Jun-2016	2	
Vijayalaxmi Sadho	INC	30-Jun-2010	29-Jun-2016	1	
Kaptan Singh Solanki	BJP	04-Aug-2009	02-Apr-2012	1	bye - resignation of Sushma Swaraj
Anil Madhav Dave	BJP	04-Aug-2009	29-Jun-2010	1	bye - resignation of Su. Thirunavukkarasar
Narendra Singh Tomar	BJP	20-Jan-2009	29-Jun-2010	1	bye - death of Laxminarayan Sharma
Raghunandan Sharma	BJP	10-Apr-2008	09-Apr-2014	1	
Prabhat Jha	BJP	10-Apr-2008	09-Apr-2014	1	
Maya Singh	BJP	10-Apr-2008	08-Dec-2013	2	elected to Gwalior East Assembly
Narayan Singh Kesari	BJP	03-Apr-2006	02-Apr-2012	2	
Anusuiya Uikey	BJP	03-Apr-2006	02-Apr-2012	1	
Vikram Verma	BJP	03-Apr-2006	02-Apr-2012	2	
Sushma Swaraj	BJP	03-Apr-2006	16-May-2009	1	elected to Vidisha Lok Sabha
Arjun Singh	INC	03-Apr-2006	04-Mar-2011	2	expired
Laxminarayan Sharma	BJP	30-Jun-2004	17-Oct-2008	1	expired
Pyarelal Khandelwal	BJP	30-Jun-2004	06-Oct-2009	2	expired
Su. Thirunavukkarasar	BJP	30-Jun-2004	05-Jul-2009	1	resigned
Narayan Singh Kesari	BJP	24-Jun-2004	02-Apr-2006	1	bye - resignation of Kailash Chandra Joshi
Obaidullah Khan Azmi	INC	10-Apr-2002	09-Apr-2008	1	
Suresh Pachouri	INC	10-Apr-2002	09-Apr-2008	4	
Maya Singh	BJP	10-Apr-2002	09-Apr-2008	1	
Manhar Bhagatram	INC	03-Apr-2000	02-Apr-2006	3	RS member from Chhattisgarh from 01-Nov-2000
H. R. Bhardwaj	INC	03-Apr-2000	02-Apr-2006	4	
Arjun Singh	INC	03-Apr-2000	02-Apr-2006	1	
P K Maheshwari	INC	03-Apr-2000	02-Apr-2006	1	
Kailash Chandra Joshi	BJP	03-Apr-2000	13-May-2004	1	elected to Bhopal Lok Sabha
Vikram Verma	BJP	03-Apr-2000	02-Apr-2006	1	
Balkavi Bairagi	INC	30-Jun-1998	29-Jun-2004	1	
Jhumak Lal Bendia	INC	30-Jun-1998	29-Jun-2004	1	RS member from Chhattisgarh from 01-Nov-2000
Mabel Rebello	INC	30-Jun-1998	29-Jun-2004	1	
Dilip Singh Judeo	BJP	30-Jun-1998	29-Jun-2004	2	RS member from Chhattisgarh from 01-Nov-2000
O. Rajagopal	BJP	30-Jun-1998	29-Jun-2004	2	
Surendra Kumar Singh	INC	10-Apr-1996	09-Apr-2002	1	RS member from Chhattisgarh from 01-Nov-2000
Suresh Pachouri	INC	10-Apr-1996	09-Apr-2002	3	
Abdul Gaiyur Qureshi	INC	10-Apr-1996	09-Apr-2002	1	
Lakkhiram Agarwal	BJP	10-Apr-1996	09-Apr-2002	2	RS member from Chhattisgarh from 01-Nov-2000
Sikander Bakht	BJP	10-Apr-1996	09-Apr-2002	2	
Hans Raj Bhardwaj	INC	03-Apr-1994	02-Apr-2000	3	
Veena Verma	INC	03-Apr-1994	02-Apr-2000	3	
Radhakishan Malviya	INC	03-Apr-1994	02-Apr-2000	3	
Ghufran Azam	INC	03-Apr-1994	02-Apr-2000	2	
Govindram Miri	BJP	03-Apr-1994	02-Apr-2000	1	
Raghavji	BJP	03-Apr-1994	02-Apr-2000	2	
Dilip Singh Judeo	BJP	30-Jun-1992	29-Jun-1998	1	
Narain Prasad Gupta	BJP	30-Jun-1992	29-Jun-1998	1	
O. Rajagopal	BJP	30-Jun-1992	29-Jun-1998	1	
Jagannath Singh	BJP	30-Jun-1992	29-Jun-1998	1	
Ajit Jogi	INC	30-Jun-1992	03-Mar-1998	2	elected to Raigarh Lok Sabha
Raghavji	BJP	12-Aug-1991	29-Jun-1992	1	bye - resignation of Atal Bihari Vajpayee
Shivprasad Chanpuria	BJP	10-Apr-1990	09-Apr-1996	1	
Kailash Sarang	BJP	10-Apr-1990	09-Apr-1996	1	
Lakhiram Agrawal	BJP	10-Apr-1990	09-Apr-1996	1	
Sikander Bakht	BJP	10-Apr-1990	09-Apr-1996	1	
Suresh Pachouri	INC	10-Apr-1990	09-Apr-1996	2	
Jinendra Kumar Jain	BJP	23-Mar-1990	02-Apr-1994	1	bye - resignation of Lal Krishna Advani
Ghufran Azam	INC	16-Jun-1989	02-Apr-1994	1	bye - resignation of Motilal Vora
Motilal Vora	INC	03-Apr-1988	08-Mar-1989	1	elected to Durg Lok Sabha
Hans Raj Bhardwaj	INC	03-Apr-1988	02-Apr-1994	2	
Ratan Kumari	INC	03-Apr-1988	02-Apr-1994	3	
Veena Verma	INC	03-Apr-1988	02-Apr-1994	2	
Radhakishan Malviya	INC	03-Apr-1988	02-Apr-1994	2	
Lal Krishna Advani	BJP	03-Apr-1988	27-Nov-1989	2	elected to New Delhi Lok Sabha
Satish Sharma	INC	30-Jun-1986	18-Nov-1991	1	elected to Amethi Lok Sabha
Surendra Singh Thakur	INC	30-Jun-1986	29-Jun-1992	1	
Ajit Jogi	INC	30-Jun-1986	29-Jun-1992	1	
Sayeeda Khatun	INC	30-Jun-1986	29-Jun-1992	1	
Atal Bihari Vajpayee	BJP	30-Jun-1986	17-Jun-1991	1	elected to Lucknow Lok Sabha
Veena Verma	INC	26-Jun-1986	02-Apr-1988	1	bye - death of Shrikant Verma
Chandrika Prasad Tripathi	INC	10-Apr-1984	09-Apr-1990	1	
Suresh Pachouri	INC	10-Apr-1984	09-Apr-1990	1	
Jagatpal Singh Thakur	INC	10-Apr-1984	09-Apr-1990	1	
Manhar Bhagatram	INC	10-Apr-1984	09-Apr-1990	2	
Vijaya Raje Scindia	BJP	10-Apr-1984	27-Nov-1989	2	elected to Guna Lok Sabha
Hans Raj Bhardwaj	INC	03-Apr-1982	02-Apr-1988	1	
Keshav Prasad Shukla	INC	03-Apr-1982	02-Apr-1988	1	
Shrikant Verma	INC	03-Apr-1982	25-May-1986	2	expired
Ratan Kumari	INC	03-Apr-1982	02-Apr-1988	2	
Radhakishan Malviya	INC	03-Apr-1982	02-Apr-1988	1	
Lal Krishna Advani	BJP	03-Apr-1982	02-Apr-1988	1	
Nand Kishore Bhatt	INC	30-Jun-1980	29-Jun-1986	3	
Praveen Kumar Prajapati	INC	30-Jun-1980	29-Jun-1986	1	
Maimoona Sultan	INC	30-Jun-1980	29-Jun-1986	2	
Pyarelal Khandelwal	BJP	30-Jun-1980	29-Jun-1986	1	
J. K. Jain	BJP	30-Jun-1980	29-Jun-1986	1	
Rajendra Singh Ishwar Singh	INC	30-Jun-1980	02-Apr-1982	1	bye - resignation of Prakash Chandra Sethi
Bhai Mahavir	JP	10-Apr-1978	09-Apr-1984	1	
Vijaya Raje Scindia	JP	10-Apr-1978	09-Apr-1984	1	
Baleshwar Dayal	JP	10-Apr-1978	09-Apr-1984	2	
Ladli Mohan Nigam	JP	10-Apr-1978	09-Apr-1984	1	
Manhar Bhagatram	INC	10-Apr-1978	09-Apr-1984	1	
Jamuna Devi	JP	10-Apr-1978	02-Apr-1980	1	bye - resignation of Bhairon Singh Shekhawat
Baleshwar Dayal	JP	14-Jul-1977	09-Apr-1978	1	bye - resignation of Virendra Kumar Sakhlecha
Sawai Singh Sisodiya	INC	03-Apr-1976	02-Apr-1982	3	
Prakash Chandra Sethi	INC	03-Apr-1976	07-Jan-1980	3	elected to Indore Lok Sabha
Gurudev Gupta	INC	03-Apr-1976	02-Apr-1982	2	
Balram Das	INC	03-Apr-1976	02-Apr-1982	2	
Ratan Kumari	INC	03-Apr-1976	02-Apr-1982	1	
Shrikant Verma	INC	03-Apr-1976	02-Apr-1982	1	
Jagdish Joshi	INC	03-Apr-1974	02-Apr-1980	1	
Shyamkumari Devi	INC	03-Apr-1974	02-Apr-1980	2	
Narayan Prasad Chaudhary	INC	03-Apr-1974	02-Apr-1980	2	
Maimoona Sultan	INC	03-Apr-1974	02-Apr-1980	1	
Bhairon Singh Shekhawat	BJS	03-Apr-1974	05-Dec-1977	1	elected to Chhabra Lok Sabha
Nand Kishore Bhatt	INC	10-Apr-1972	09-Apr-1978	2	
Vidyawati Chaturvedi	INC	10-Apr-1972	09-Apr-1978	2	
Shankarlal Tiwari	INC	10-Apr-1972	09-Apr-1978	1	
Mahendra Bahadur Singh	INC	10-Apr-1972	09-Apr-1978	1	
Virendra Kumar Sakhlecha	BJS	10-Apr-1972	26-Jun-1977	1	elected to Jawad Assembly
Balram Das	INC	03-Apr-1970	02-Apr-1976	1	
Chakrapani Shukla	INC	03-Apr-1970	02-Apr-1976	2	
Sawai Singh Sisodiya	INC	03-Apr-1970	02-Apr-1976	2	
Bhawani Prasad Tiwari	INC	03-Apr-1970	02-Apr-1976	2	
Sambhaji Angre	BJS	03-Apr-1970	02-Apr-1976	2	
Vijay Bhusan Deosharan	BJS	03-Apr-1970	02-Apr-1976	1	
Sawai Singh Sisodiya	INC	28-Apr-1969	02-Apr-1970	1	bye - death of K. C. Baghel
D. K. Jadhav	INC	25-Mar-1969	02-Apr-1970	1	bye - death of Niranjan Singh
Syed Ahmad	INC	03-Apr-1968	02-Apr-1974	2	
Narayan Prasad Chaudhary	INC	03-Apr-1968	02-Apr-1974	1	
Shyamkumari Devi	INC	03-Apr-1968	02-Apr-1974	1	
Ram Sahai	INC	03-Apr-1968	02-Apr-1974	1	
Narayan Shejwalkar	BJS	03-Apr-1968	02-Apr-1974	1	
Shiv Dutt Upadhyaya	INC	31-Mar-1967	02-Apr-1970	1	bye - resignation of Prakash Chandra Sethi
Chakrapani Shukla	INC	08-Feb-1966	02-Apr-1970	1	bye - death of Giriraj Kishore Kapoor
Nand Kishore Bhatt	INC	03-Apr-1966	02-Apr-1972	1	
Vidyawati Chaturvedi	INC	03-Apr-1966	02-Apr-1972	1	
Shankar Pratap Singh	INC	03-Apr-1966	02-Apr-1972	1	
A. D. Mani	Ind	03-Apr-1966	02-Apr-1972	2	
Niranjan Varma	BJS	03-Apr-1966	02-Apr-1972	1	
Bhawani Prasad Tiwari	INC	03-Apr-1964	02-Apr-1970	1	
Prakash Chandra Sethi	INC	03-Apr-1964	20-Feb-1967	2	elected to Indore Lok Sabha
Dayaldas Kurre	INC	03-Apr-1964	02-Apr-1970	2	
Niranjan Singh	INC	03-Apr-1964	17-Oct-1968	2	expired
Giriraj Kishore Kapoor	Oth	03-Apr-1964	29-Aug-1965	1	expired
K. C. Baghel	Ind	03-Apr-1964	22-Feb-1969	1	expired
Ram Sahai	INC	03-Apr-1962	02-Apr-1968	2	
Rameshchandra Khandekar	INC	03-Apr-1962	02-Apr-1968	1	
Mahant Laxmi Narayan Das	INC	03-Apr-1962	02-Apr-1968	1	
Syed Ahmad	INC	03-Apr-1962	02-Apr-1968	1	
Vimal Kumar Chordia	BJS	03-Apr-1962	02-Apr-1968	1	
Prakash Chandra Sethi	INC	02-Feb-1961	02-Apr-1964	1	bye - disqualification of Kesho Prasad Verma
A. D. Mani	Ind	22-Dec-1960	02-Apr-1966	1	bye - death of Trimbak Damodar Pustake
Gurudev Gupta	INC	03-Apr-1960	02-Apr-1966	1	
Thakur Bhannu Pratap Singh	INC	03-Apr-1960	02-Apr-1966	3	
Ratanlal Kishorilal Malviya	INC	03-Apr-1960	02-Apr-1966	2	
Gopikrishna Vijayavargiya	INC	03-Apr-1960	02-Apr-1966	2	
Kesho Prasad Verma	Oth	03-Apr-1960	02-Apr-1966	1	disqualified
Dayaldas Kurre	INC	03-Apr-1958	02-Apr-1964	1	
Seeta Parmanand	INC	03-Apr-1958	02-Apr-1964	2	
Trimbak Damodar Pustake	INC	03-Apr-1958	11-Aug-1960	2	expired
Vishnu Vinayak Sarwate	INC	03-Apr-1958	02-Apr-1964	2	
Niranjan Singh	INC	03-Apr-1958	02-Apr-1964	1	

== Before the formation of Madhya Pradesh state in 1956 ==
=== Madhya Bharat ===
Name	Party	Term start	Term end	Term	Notes
Gopikrishna Vijayavargiya	INC	03-Apr-1954	02-Apr-1960	1	
Raghubir Sinh	INC	03-Apr-1954	02-Apr-1960	2	
Trimbak Damodar Pustake	INC	03-Apr-1952	02-Apr-1958	1	
Vishnu Vinayak Sarwate	INC	03-Apr-1952	02-Apr-1958	1	
Krishna Kant Vyas	INC	03-Apr-1952	02-Apr-1956	1	
Kanhaiyalal Vaidya	INC	03-Apr-1952	02-Apr-1956	1	
Raghubir Sinh	INC	03-Apr-1952	02-Apr-1954	1	
Sambhaji Angre	HMS	03-Apr-1952	02-Apr-1954	1	

=== Bhopal State ===
Name	Party	Term start	Term end	Term	Notes
Bheron Prasad	INC	03-Apr-1952	02-Apr-1958	1	

=== Vindhya Pradesh ===
Name	Party	Term start	Term end	Term	Notes
Krishna Kumari	INC	03-Apr-1954	02-Apr-1960	1	
Gulsher Ahmed	INC	03-Apr-1952	02-Apr-1956	1	
Baij Nath Dube	Socialist Party (India)	03-Apr-1952	02-Apr-1954	1	
