= 2030 Rajya Sabha elections =

Elections for the upper house of Indian Parliament

- 2030

65 of the 233 (Note: excluding 12 nominated seats) elected seats in the Rajya Sabha 123 (Note: out of 245(including 12 nominated seats)) total seats needed for a majority
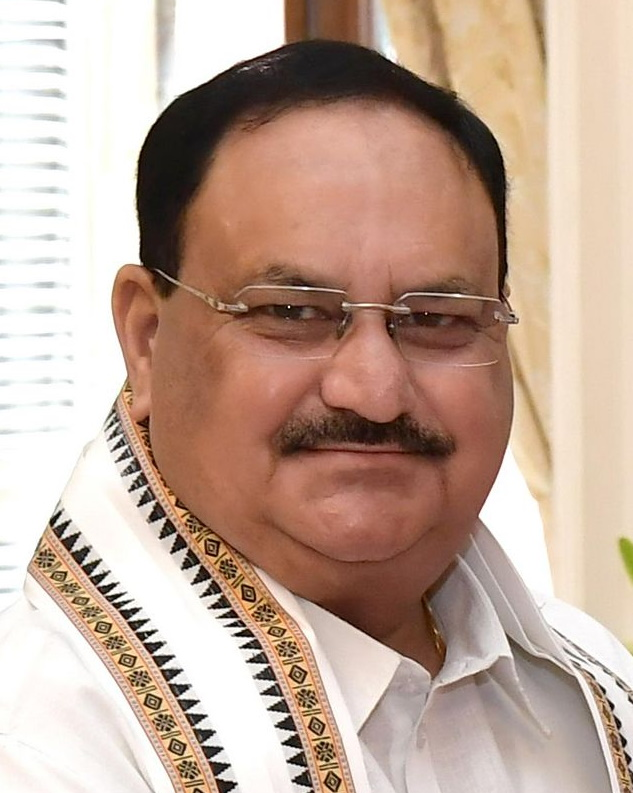

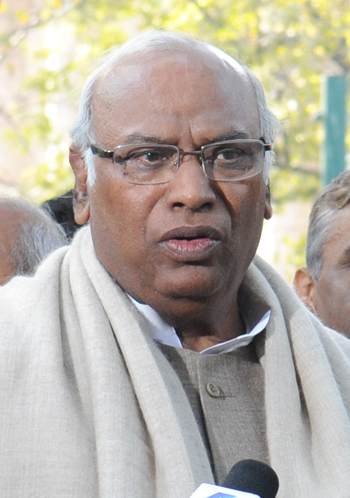
	First party	Second party
Leader	J. P. Nadda	Mallikarjun Kharge
Party	BJP	INC
Alliance	NDA	INDIA
Leader since	24 June 2024	16 February 2021
Majority before election
National Democratic Alliance
Elected Majority
TBD

The 2030 Rajya Sabha elections will be held as part of a routine six-year cycle of the upper house of the Parliament of India to elect 65 of its 245 members, of which the states through their legislators elect 233, and the remaining 12 are appointed by the President.

== Members retiring ==
=== Delhi ===
#	Previous MP	Party	Term end	Elected MP	Party
1	Sanjay Singh	AAP	27-Jan-2030	Sanjay Singh	AAP
2	N. D. Gupta	AAP	27-Jan-2030		BJP
3	Swati Maliwal (Note: Defected from AAP to BJP in April 2026.)	BJP	27-Jan-2030		BJP

=== Sikkim ===
#	Previous MP	Party	Term end	Elected MP	Party
1	Dorjee Tshering Lepcha	BJP	23-Feb-2030	TBD	

=== Andhra Pradesh ===
#	Previous MP	Party	Term end	Elected MP	Party
1	Y. V. Subba Reddy	YSRCP	02-Apr-2030	TBD	
2	Meda Raghunath Reddy	YSRCP	02-Apr-2030	TBD	
3	Golla Baburao	YSRCP	02-Apr-2030	TBD	

=== Bihar ===
#	Previous MP	Party	Alliance	Term end	Elected MP	Party	Alliance
1	Dharamshila Gupta	BJP	NDA	02-Apr-2030			NDA
2	Bhim Singh	BJP	NDA	02-Apr-2030			NDA
3	Sanjay Kumar Jha	JD(U)	NDA	02-Apr-2030			NDA
4	Akhilesh Prasad Singh	INC	MGB (INDIA)	02-Apr-2030			NDA
5	Sanjay Yadav	RJD	MGB (INDIA)	02-Apr-2030			NDA
6	Manoj Jha	RJD	MGB (INDIA)	02-Apr-2030			MGB (INDIA)

=== Chhattisgarh ===
#	Previous MP	Party	Term end	Elected MP	Party
1	Devendra Pratap Singh	BJP	02-Apr-2030	TBD	

=== Gujarat ===
#	Previous MP	Party	Term end	Elected MP	Party
1	J. P. Nadda	BJP	02-Apr-2030	TBD	
2	Govind Dholakia	BJP	02-Apr-2030	TBD	
3	Mayankbhai Nayak	BJP	02-Apr-2030	TBD	
4	Jasvantsinh Parmar	BJP	02-Apr-2030	TBD	

=== Haryana ===
#	Previous MP	Party	Term end	Elected MP	Party
1	Subhash Barala	BJP	02-Apr-2030	TBD	

=== Himachal Pradesh ===
#	Previous MP	Party	Term end	Elected MP	Party
1	Harsh Mahajan	BJP	02-Apr-2030	TBD	

=== Karnataka ===
#	Previous MP	Party	Term end	Elected MP	Party
1	Syed Naseer Hussain	INC	02-Apr-2030	TBD	
2	Ajay Maken	INC	02-Apr-2030	TBD	
3	G. C. Chandrasekhar	INC	02-Apr-2030	TBD	
4	Narayana Bhandage	BJP	02-Apr-2030	TBD	

=== Madhya Pradesh ===
#	Previous MP	Party	Term end	Elected MP	Party
1	L. Murugan	BJP	02-Apr-2030	TBD	
2	Umesh Nath Maharaj	BJP	02-Apr-2030	TBD	
3	Maya Naroliya	BJP	02-Apr-2030	TBD	
4	Bansilal Gurjar	BJP	02-Apr-2030	TBD	
5	Ashok Singh	INC	02-Apr-2030	TBD	

=== Maharashtra ===
#	Previous MP	Part	Alliance	Term end	Elected MP	Party	Alliance
1	Medha Kulkarni	BJP	MY (NDA)	02-Apr-2030	TBD		
2	Ajit Gopchade	BJP	MY (NDA)	02-Apr-2030	TBD		
3	Ashok Chavan	BJP	MY (NDA)	02-Apr-2030	TBD		
4	Milind Deora	SHS	MY (NDA)	02-Apr-2030	TBD		
5	Praful Patel	NCP	MY (NDA)	02-Apr-2030	TBD		
6	Chandrakant Handore	INC	MVA (INDIA)	02-Apr-2030	TBD		

=== Telangana ===
#	Previous MP	Party	Term end	Elected MP	Party
1	Renuka Chowdhury	INC	02-Apr-2030	TBD	
2	M. Anil Kumar Yadav	INC	02-Apr-2030	TBD	
3	Vaddiraju Ravichandra	BRS	02-Apr-2030	TBD	

=== Uttar Pradesh ===
#	Previous MP	Party	Term end	Elected MP	Party
1	Sudhanshu Trivedi	BJP	02-Apr-2030	TBD	
2	Ratanjit Pratap Narain Singh	BJP	02-Apr-2030	TBD	
3	Chaudhary Tejveer Singh	BJP	02-Apr-2030	TBD	
4	Sadhana Singh	BJP	02-Apr-2030	TBD	
5	Amarpal Maurya	BJP	02-Apr-2030	TBD	
6	Sangeeta Balwant	BJP	02-Apr-2030	TBD	
7	Naveen Jain	BJP	02-Apr-2030	TBD	
8	Sanjay Seth	BJP	02-Apr-2030	TBD	
9	Ramji Lal Suman	SP	02-Apr-2030	TBD	
10	Jaya Bachchan	SP	02-Apr-2030	TBD	

=== Uttarakhand ===
#	Previous MP	Party	Term end	Elected MP	Party
1	Mahendra Bhatt	BJP	02-Apr-2030	TBD	

=== West Bengal ===
#	Previous MP	Party	Term end	Elected MP	Party
1	Nadimul Haque	MAITC	02-Apr-2030		DTC
2	Mamata Bala Thakur	MAITC	02-Apr-2030		BJP
3	Sagarika Ghose	MAITC	02-Apr-2030		BJP
4	Sushmita Dev	BJP	02-Apr-2030		BJP
5	Samik Bhattacharya	BJP	02-Apr-2030	Samik Bhattacharya	BJP

=== Odisha ===
#	Previous MP	Party	Term end	Elected MP	Party
1	Debashish Samantaray	BJP	03-Apr-2030	TBD	
2	Ashwini Vaishnaw	BJP	03-Apr-2030	TBD	
3	Subhashish Khuntia	BJD	03-Apr-2030	TBD	

=== Rajasthan ===
#	Previous MP	Party	Term end	Elected MP	Party
1	Sonia Gandhi	INC	03-Apr-2030	TBD	
2	Chunnilal Garasiya	BJP	03-Apr-2030	TBD	
3	Madan Rathore	BJP	03-Apr-2030	TBD	

=== Jharkhand ===
#	Previous MP	Party	Alliance	Term end	Elected MP	Party	Alliance
1	Pradip Kumar Varma	BJP	NDA	03-May-2030	TBD		
2	Sarfaraz Ahmad	JMM	MGB (INDIA)	03-May-2030	TBD		

=== Kerala ===
#	Previous MP	Party	Alliance	Term end	Elected MP	Party	Alliance
1	Haris Beeran	IUML	UDF (INDIA)	01-Jul-2030			UDF (INDIA)
2	P. P. Suneer	CPI	LDF (INDIA)	01-Jul-2030			UDF (INDIA)
3	Jose K. Mani	KC(M)	LDF (INDIA)	01-Jul-2030			(Note: Quota = 140 ÷ (3+1) + 1 = 36 votes. UDF with 102 MLAs could win 2 seats; remaining votes are UDF 30, LDF 35 and Others 6. Since none reach 36, the result of the 3rd seat depends on the stand of the 3 Other MLAs (BJP-3).)

=== Nominations ===
No	Previous MP	Party	Term end	Nominated MP	Party	Date of appointment
1	Satnam Singh Sandhu	Nominated (BJP)	29-Jan-2024	TBD		
2	Sudha Murty	Nominated	07-Mar-2024	TBD		

== See also ==
- List of current members of the Rajya Sabha
- 2030 elections in India
