= 1980 Rajya Sabha elections =

Elections for the Upper House of Indian Parliament

Rajya Sabha elections were held in 1980, to elect members of the Rajya Sabha, Indian Parliament's upper chamber.

== Elections ==
Elections were held in 1980 to elect members from various states. The list is incomplete.

=== Members elected ===
The following members are elected in the elections held in 1980. They are members for the term 1980-86 and retire in year 1986, except in case of the resignation or death before the term.

State - Member - Party

Rajya Sabha members for term 1980-1986
State	Member Name	Party	Remark
Andhra Pradesh	V C Keshava Rao	INC	R
Andhra Pradesh	Syed R Ali	INC	
Andhra Pradesh	A. S. Chowdhri	INC	
Andhra Pradesh	B Krishna Mohan	INC	
Andhra Pradesh	Smt Roda Mistry	OTH	
Andhra Pradesh	G Swamy Naik	INC	
Assam	Biswa Goswami	OTH	
Assam	Bijoy Krishna Handique	INC	
Bihar	Ashwini Kumar	BJP	
Bihar	Sitaram Kesari	INC	
Bihar	Indradeep Sinha	CPI	
Bihar	Manorama Pandey	INC	
Bihar	Ramchandra Bharadwaj	INC	
Bihar	Ram Bhagat Paswan	INC	29/12/1984
Bihar	Hukmdeo Narayan Yadav	JAN	
Haryana	Sultan Singh	INC	
Haryana	Sushil Chand Mohunta	JD	
Himachal Pradesh	Usha Malhotra	INC	
Jammu and Kashmir	Ghulan M Shawl	JKNC	
Kerala	B. V. Abdulla Koya	ML	
Kerala	C Haridas	INC	
Kerala	O J Joseph	CPM	
Karnataka	Margaret Alva	INC	
Karnataka	M Basavaraju	INC	
Karnataka	Monika Das	INC	
Karnataka	M Maddanna	INC	
Karnataka	R S Naik	JDU	
Madhya Pradesh	Nand Kishore Bhatt	INC	
Madhya Pradesh	Pyarelal Khandelwal	BJP	
Madhya Pradesh	Maimoona Sultan	INC	
Madhya Pradesh	J K Jain	BJP	
Madhya Pradesh	Parveen Kumar Prajapati	INC	
Maharashtra	Jagannath S Akarte	INC	
Maharashtra	Najma Heptulla	INC	
Maharashtra	A. G. Kulkarni	INC	
Maharashtra	S W Dhabe	INC	
Maharashtra	Pramilabai D Chavan	INC	28/12/1984
Maharashtra	Dr Joseph Leon D'souza	INC	28/12/1984
Maharashtra	Dr Shanti G Patel	JD	
Nagaland	T Aliba Imti	OTH	
Nominated	Nargis	NOM	Dea 03/05/1981
Nominated	Dr Lokesh Chandra	NOM	
Nominated	Scato Swu	NOM	
Nominated	Khuswant Singh	NOM	
Orissa	Jagadish Jani	INC	
Orissa	Dr Shyam Sundar Mohapatra	IND	
Orissa	Akshay Panda	INC	
Punjab	Harvendra Singh Hanspal	INC	
Punjab	Jagdev Singh Talwandi	SAD	
Rajashtan	Ram Niwas Mirdha	INC	29/12/1984
Rajashthan	Dhuleshwar Meena	INC	
Rajashthan	Molana Asrarul Haq	INC	
Rajashthan	Jaswant Singh	BJP	
Tamil Nadu	P Anbalagan	AIADMK	
Tamil Nadu	R Mohanarangam	AIADMK	disq 08/09/1982
Tamil Nadu	L Ganesan	DMK	
Tamil Nadu	D Heerachand	AIADMK	
Tamil Nadu	M Kalyanasundaram	CPI	
Tamil Nadu	M S Ramachandran	INC	
Tamil Nadu	R Ramakrishnan	AIADMK	
Tripura	Ila Bhattacharya	CPM	
Uttar Pradesh	Kalp Nath Rai	INC	
Uttar Pradesh	Ram Sewak Chaudhary	INC	
Uttar Pradesh	Satya Pal Malik	INC	
Uttar Pradesh	Rudra Pratap Singh	INC	
Uttar Pradesh	Maulana Asad Madani	INC	
Uttar Pradesh	Syed S Razi	INC	res 14/05/1985
Uttar Pradesh	Piare Lall Kureel	INC	dea 27/12/1984
Uttar Pradesh	Mustafa Rashid Shervani	INC	dea 08/04/1981
Uttar Pradesh	S A Hashmi	OTH	
Uttar Pradesh	Khurshed Alam Khan	INC	res 06/12/1984
Uttar Pradesh	Dharamvir	INC	dea 22/12/1984
Uttar Pradesh	Sudhakar Pandey	INC	

== Bye-elections ==
The following bye elections were held in the year 1980.

State - Member - Party

1. WB - Sangdopal Lepcha - CPM ( ele 11/03/1980 term till 1984 )
2. HR - Hari Singh Nalwa - INC ( ele 19/03/1980 term till 1982 )
3. Jammu & Kashmir - Sharief-ud-Din Shariq - JKNC ( ele 19/03/1980 term till 1984 )
4. Karnataka - B Ibrahim - INC ( ele 25/03/1980 term till 1984 )
5. Punjab - Gurcharan Singh Tohra - SAD ( ele 09/05/1980 term till 1982 )
6. MH - M C Bhandare - INC ( ele 30/06/1980 term till 1982 )
7. UP - Dinesh Singh - OTH ( ele 30/06/1980 term till 1982 )
8. UP - Narsingh Narain Pandey - OTH ( ele 30/06/1980 term till 1982 )
9. MP - Rajendra Singh Ishwar Singh - OTH ( ele 30/06/1980 term till 1982 )
10. Tamil Nadu - P Anbalagan - AIADMK ( ele 28/07/1980 term till 1984 )
11. MH - N M Kamble - INC ( ele 04/08/1980 term till 1982 )
12. Uttar Pradesh - P N Sukul - INC ( ele 05/07/1980 term till 1984 )
