= Sumer Singh Solanki =

Indian politician

Member of Parliament, Rajya Sabha
- In office 22 July 2020 – 21 June 2026
- Preceded by: Prabhat Jha
- Succeeded by: Rajneesh Agrawal
- Constituency: Madhya Pradesh

Personal details
- Born: 1 May 1972 (age 54)
- Party: Bharatiya Janata Party
- Relatives: Makhansingh Solanki (Uncle)
- Education: PhD (History)

Sumer Singh Solanki (born 1 May 1972) is an Indian politician and a member of the Rajya Sabha from Madhya Pradesh. He is a member of the Bharatiya Janata Party. Before entering politics he was an assistant professor of history in Barwani, Madhya Pradesh. In 2020 Solanki's name in the list of Rajya Sabha candidates surprised many and it was later known that he was chosen on the recommendations of the RSS.

Solanki has been working for the upliftment of tribal people through Vanwasi Kalyan Parishad for long time.
