= Kurre =

Kurre may refer to:

- Dayaldas Kurre, an Indian politician from Madhya Pradesh
- Kurre Jehanabad, a village in Bihar, India
- Kurre Lansburgh (born 1977), a Swedish freestyle skier
