= Balram Das =

Indian politician (born 1931)

Member of Parliament, Rajya Sabha
- In office 1970–1982
- Constituency: Madhya Pradesh

Personal details
- Born: 7 March 1931
- Party: Indian National Congress
- Spouse: Ram Kumari

Balram Das (born 7 March 1931) is an Indian politician. He was a Member of Parliament, representing Madhya Pradesh in the Rajya Sabha the upper house of India's Parliament as a member of the Indian National Congress.
