= Kavita Patidar =

Indian politician

Member of Parliament, Rajya Sabha
- Incumbent
- Assumed office 2022
- Constituency: Madhya Pradesh

Personal details
- Born: 17 August 1974 (age 51) Indore
- Party: Bharatiya Janata Party

Kavita Patidar is an Indian politician, who is a member of the Rajya Sabha, the upper house of the Parliament of India, from Madhya Pradesh. She is the Indore district panchayat chairperson in the Madhya Pradesh unit of the Bharatiya Janata Party.
