= Niranjan Varma =

Indian politician (1914–2012)

Member of Parliament, Rajya Sabha
- In office 1966–1972
- Constituency: Madhya Pradesh

Personal details
- Born: October 1914 Vidisha district, Madhya Pradesh, British India
- Died: 17 March 2012 (aged 97)
- Party: Bharatiya Jana Sangh

Niranjan Varma (October 1914 – 17 March 2012) was an Indian politician. He was a Member of Parliament, representing Madhya Pradesh in the Rajya Sabha the upper house of India's Parliament as a member of the Bharatiya Jana Sangh. Varma died on 17 March 2012, at the age of 97.
