= Meghraj Jain =

Indian politician

MP of Rajya Sabha for Madhya Pradesh
- In office 15 September 2014 – 2 April 2018
- Succeeded by: Ajay Pratap Singh, BJP
- Constituency: Madhya Pradesh

Personal details
- Born: May 13, 1943
- Party: Bharatiya Janata Party
- Profession: Politician

Meghraj Jain (13 May 1943) is a Bharatiya Janata Party (BJP) politician and former RSS Pracharak. He is a Member of Parliament, representing Madhya Pradesh in the Rajya Sabha the upper house of Indian Parliament. He was elected in a Rajya Sabha twice by bye election in 2011 & 2014 In 2011 Replace Arjun Singh ji who is dead & 2014 replace Kaptan Singh Solanki who resigned to become the Governor of Haryana.
