= Tarun Chugh =

Indian politician

Member of Parliament, Rajya Sabha
- Incumbent
- Assumed office 22 June 2026
- Preceded by: George Kurian
- Constituency: Madhya Pradesh

Personal details
- Born: 3 May 1973 (age 53) Amritsar district, Punjab, India
- Party: Bharatiya Janata Party
- Occupation: Politician; Spokesperson

Tarun Chugh (born 3 May 1973) is an Indian politician from the Bharatiya Janata Party. He is a Member of Parliament, representing Madhya Pradesh in the Rajya Sabha the upper house of India's Parliament since June 2026.

Hailing from Amritsar, Punjab, Chugh is a key organizational strategist within the BJP and comes from a family with a three-generation association with the Rashtriya Swayamsevak Sangh.
