= Ashok Singh (politician, born 1963) =

Indian politician from Madhya Pradesh

Member of Parliament, Rajya Sabha from Madhya Pradesh
- Incumbent
- Assumed office 3 April 2024
- Preceded by: Rajmani Patel

Party roles
- c. 2023 – c. present: Vice-president of Madhya Pradesh Congress Committee
- 2021 - 2023: State Treasurer of Madhya Pradesh Congress Committee

Personal details
- Born: 1 November 1963 (age 62) Gwalior, Madhya Pradesh, India
- Party: Indian National Congress
- Education: Jiwaji University (B.Com)
- Occupation: Politician, rentor

Ashok Singh (born 1 November 1963) is an Indian politician who is serving as Member of Rajya Sabha from Madhya Pradesh since April 2024. A member of Indian National Congress, he served as Vice-President of Madhya Pradesh Congress Committee.

== Birth and education ==
Singh was born on 1 November 1963 in Gwalior, Madhya Pradesh. His father Rajendra Singh was former MLA and state PWD minister of Madhya Pradesh. He completed his studies of Bachelor of Commerce in Jiwaji University in 1981.

== Political career ==
Singh has contested elections four times from the Gwalior Lok Sabha seat in 2007 (by-election), 2009, 2014, and 2019, albeit facing defeat each time to Bharatiya Janata Party. Despite that, Singh has held several key positions within the party, including Treasurer in 2021, General Secretary, and District President for rural areas in Madhya Pradesh Congress wing.

He was elected as member of Rajya Sabha in 2024 elections, succeeding Rajmani Patel. He was also election observer in 2018 by-polls and the 2020 and 2023 assembly elections in Madhya Pradesh. He is also known to be close ally of former Chief Minister Digvijaya Singh and also considered a rival of the Scindia royal family, who dominated the Gwalior politics for decades.
