= Sawai Singh Sisodiya =

Indian politician

Minister of State for Finance (Department of Revenue and Expenditure)
- In office 19 October 1980 – 2 September 1982
- Prime Minister: Indira Gandhi
- Minister: Ramaswamy Venkataraman; Pranab Mukherjee
- Preceded by: Jagannath Pahadia
- Succeeded by: S. B. P. Pattabhirama Rao

Member of Parliament, Rajya Sabha
- In office 28 April 1969 – 2 September 1982
- Constituency: Madhya Pradesh

Personal details
- Born: 19 November 1919 Barnagar, Ujjain District, Central Provinces, British India
- Died: 24 March 2007 (aged 87)
- Party: Indian National Congress

Sawai Singh Sisodiya (1919–2007) was an Indian politician. He was a Member of Parliament representing Madhya Pradesh in the Rajya Sabha the upper house of India's Parliament as member of the Indian National Congress. He served as Minister of State in the Ministry of Finance (Department of Revenue and Expenditure) in the Fourth Indira Gandhi ministry between 19 October 1980 and 2 September 1982.
