= Vivek Tankha =

Indian politician

The Honourable Vivek Krishna Tankha MP
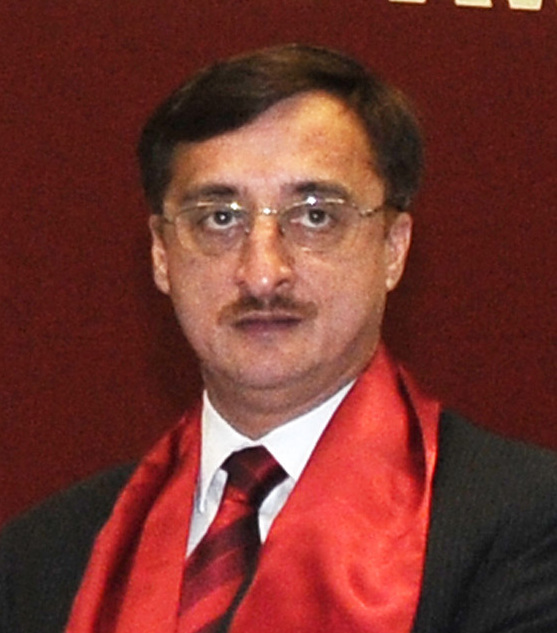
- Vivek Tankha in 2010

Member of Parliament, Rajya Sabha
- Incumbent
- Assumed office 30 June 2016
- Preceded by: Vijayalaxmi Sadho, INC
- Constituency: Madhya Pradesh

Advocate General of Madhya Pradesh State
- In office 16 February 1999 – 15 November 2003
- Preceded by: S. L. Saxena
- Succeeded by: R. N. Singh

Personal details
- Born: 21 September 1956 (age 70) Rewa, Madhya Pradesh, India
- Party: Indian National Congress
- Spouse: Aarti Tankha
- Children: 2
- Education: LLB
- Alma mater: Delhi University
- Profession: Lawyer, Politician
- Website: http://vivektankha.blogspot.com/
- As of 17 June, 2018 Source: ["Affidavit" (PDF). Vidhan Sabha, Madhya Pradesh Legislative Assembly.]

Vivek Krishna Tankha (born 21 September 1956) is an Indian lawyer and politician, serving as a Senior Advocate at the Supreme Court of India and as a Member of Parliament. He previously had served as the Additional Solicitor General of India and Advocate General of Madhya Pradesh.

He was elected to the Rajya Sabha, upper house of the Parliament of India from Madhya Pradesh as a member of the Indian National Congress. He was the Congress party's candidate for Lok Sabha from Jabalpur in the 2014 Indian general elections and the 2019 Indian general elections.

He was reelected as a Rajya Sabha MP in 2022.

== Career ==
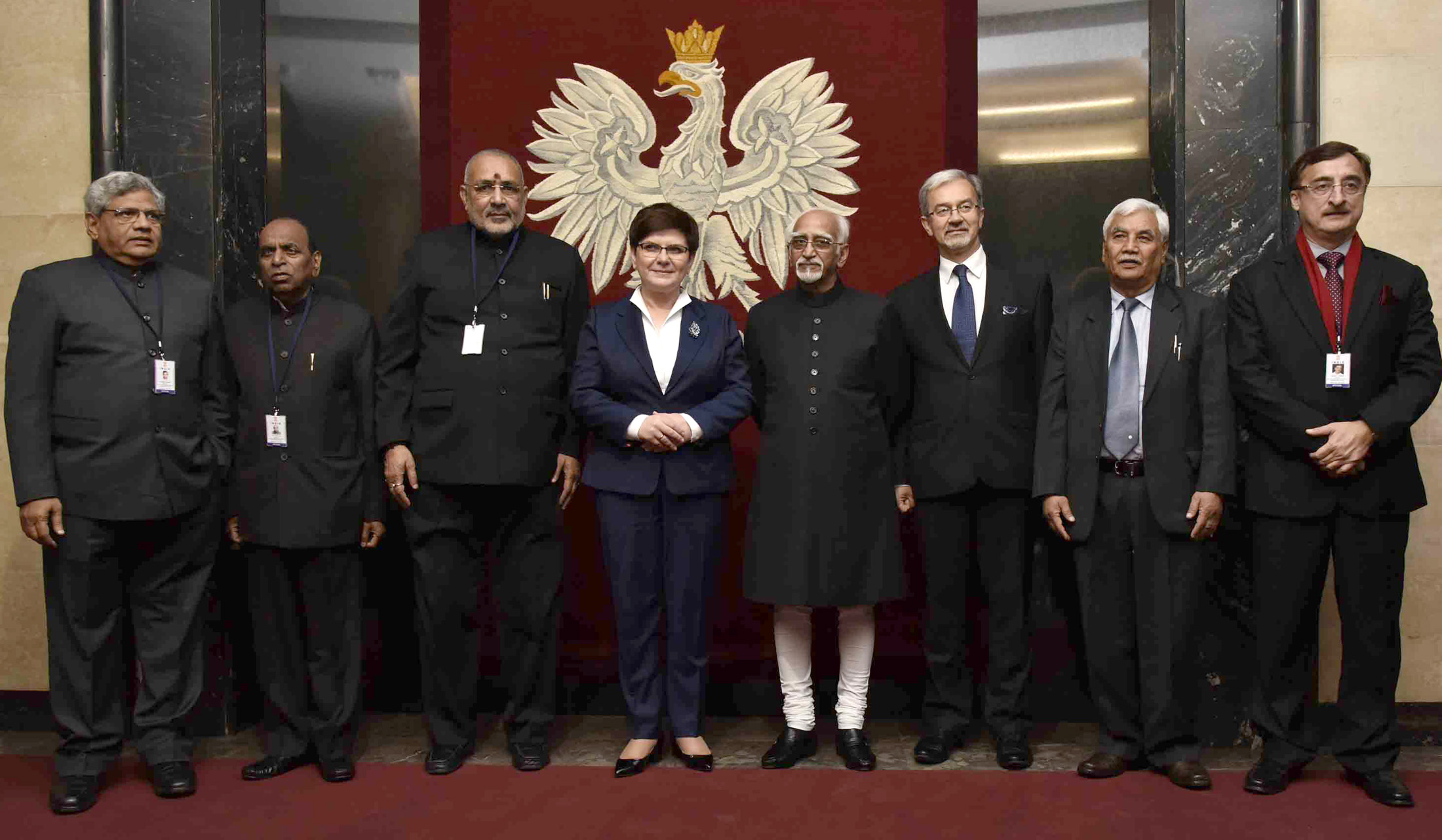
Tankha (first from right) in Poland with then Indian Vice President Hamid Ansari and Polish Prime Minister Beata Szydło

Vivek Tankha was one of the youngest Advocate Generals of Madhya Pradesh (16 February 1999 to 15 November 2003). Tankha was Designated Senior Advocate by the Full Court of the High Court in 1999. He was also the first lawyer from Madhya Pradesh to have been appointed Additional Solicitor General of India. He is also Chairman at Legal Department of AICC. K C Mittal is Secretary Legal Department of AICC.

In 2022, he introduced a private member bill titled "KASHMIRI PANDITS (RECOURSE, RESTITUTION, REHABILITATION AND RESETTLEMENT) BILL, 2022" in Rajya Sabha in 2022, to restore Kashmiri Pandits.
