= Sumitra Balmik =

Indian politician

The Honourable Sumitra Balmik MP
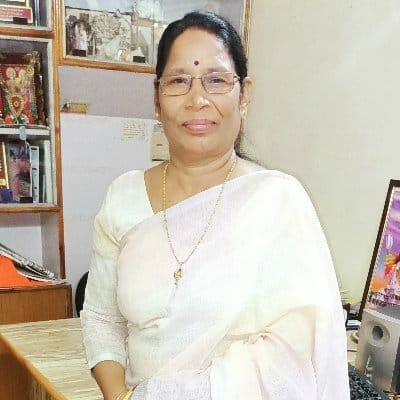
- Sumitra Balmik

Member of Parliament, Rajya Sabha
- Incumbent
- Assumed office 2022
- Constituency: Madhya Pradesh

Vice-president of Madhya Pradesh BJP
- Incumbent
- Assumed office 2021

Chair of the Municipal Corporation in Jabalpur
- In office 2014–2019

Deputy chair of the Municipal Corporation in Jabalpur
- In office 2006–2009

Personal details
- Born: 1 July 1955 (age 71) Jabalpur
- Party: Bharatiya Janata Party
- Children: 3
- Education: BA
- Profession: Politician

Sumitra Balmik (born 1 July 1955) is an Indian politician, Member of the Parliament Rajya Sabha. She is a vice president of the Bharatiya Janata Party, Madhya Pradesh unit.

== Career ==
She became a member of the Bharatiya Janata Party of Madhya Pradesh unit in 1993. In 1999, she was first time elected as councillor from Jabalpur, Madhya Pradesh. In 2004, she was again re-elected for the second time as councillor from Jabalpur, Madhya Pradesh.

In 2006, Sumitra Valmiki become the City president of Mahila Morcha from Jabalpur, Madhya Pradesh. In same year, she was also elected as Deputy Chairman of the Municipal Corporation of Jabalpur, Madhya Pradesh. In 2014, she was again re-elected as councillor by winning from Jabalpur, Madhya Pradesh and she was elected as Chairman of the Municipal Corporation of Jabalpur, Madhya Pradesh.

== Early life ==
Sumitra Valmiki was born in the Shahpura, Patan-Tehsil Jabalpur District, Madhya Pradesh to a Dalit caste family. She finished her schooling from Govt. School of Shahpura, Patan-Tehsil Jabalpur District, Madhya Pradesh and went on to obtain a Bachelor of Arts degree from the Government College, Jabalpur District. After completing her Graduation, she taught tailoring classes in order to empower women in the area. She also has extensive legal knowledge and is an activist for local female welfare. Her social dedication to sort-out the issues for women welfare and other issues related to their area make her popular.
