= Chakrapani Shukla =

Indian politician (1916–1992)

Member of Parliament, Rajya Sabha
- In office 1966–1976
- Constituency: Madhya Pradesh

Personal details
- Born: 2 April 1916
- Died: 1992 (aged 75–76)
- Party: Indian National Congress

Chakrapani Shukla (2 April 1916 – 1992) was an Indian politician. He was a Member of Parliament, representing Madhya Pradesh in the Rajya Sabha the upper house of India's Parliament as a member of the Indian National Congress.

Shukla died in 1992.
