= Shruti Gangwar =

Indian politician

Member of Parliament, Rajya Sabha
- Incumbent
- Assumed office 26 November 2026
- Preceded by: Arun Singh (Indian politician)

Personal details
- Party: Bharatiya Janata Party
- Parent: Santosh Kumar Gangwar (father)

Shruti Gangwar is an Indian politician who represents the Bharatiya Janata Party. A member of Parliament in the Rajya Sabha from Uttar Pradesh. she is the daughter of veteran BJP leader and Jharkhand Governor Santosh Kumar Gangwar.
