= Niranjan Singh =

Indian politician

Member of Parliament, Rajya Sabha
- In office 1958–1968
- Constituency: Madhya Pradesh

Personal details
- Born: 1906
- Party: Indian National Congress

Niranjan Singh was an Indian politician. He was a Member of Parliament, representing Madhya Pradesh in the Rajya Sabha the upper house of India's Parliament as a member of the Indian National Congress.
