= Prabhat Jha (politician) =

Indian politician (1957–2024)

Member of Parliament, Rajya Sabha
- In office 10 April 2008 – 9 April 2020
- Succeeded by: Sumer Singh Solanki
- Constituency: Madhya Pradesh

President of Bharatiya Janata Party, Madhya Pradesh
- In office 8 May 2010 – 16 December 2012
- Preceded by: Narendra Singh Tomar
- Succeeded by: Narendra Singh Tomar

Personal details
- Born: 4 June 1957; Darbhanga, Bihar, India
- Died: 26 July 2024 (aged 67); Delhi, India
- Political party: Bharatiya Janata Party
- Spouse: Ranjana Jha (m. 1986)
- Children: 2 sons
- Parents: Paneshwar Jha (father); Amarawati Devi (mother)
- Education: B.Sc, M.A. (Political Science), LL.B
- Alma mater: Maharani Laxmi Bai Govt. College of Excellence
- Profession: Journalist, writer, columnist, politician

Prabhat Jha (4 June 1957 – 26 July 2024) was an Indian politician. He had been a member of the Rajya Sabha from Madhya Pradesh state in India. He was the Madhya Pradesh Bharatiya Janata Party President in 2010 until December 2012. He was the National Vice President of the Bharatiya Janata Party.

Jha was also editor of BJP mouthpiece Kamal Sandesh.

== Biography ==
Jha was born in Hariharpur, Darbhanga district, Bihar. He did his schooling from Gwalior, Madhya Pradesh India. He was a journalist before entering politics.

Jha was married to Ranjana Jha and they had two sons. He died in Delhi on 26 July 2024, at the age of 67.
