= Rajneesh Agrawal =

Indian politician

Member of Parliament, Rajya Sabha
- Incumbent
- Assumed office 21 June 2026
- Preceded by: Sumer Singh Solanki
- Constituency: Madhya Pradesh

Personal details
- Born: Mandi Bamora, Sagar district, Madhya Pradesh, India
- Party: Bharatiya Janata Party
- Occupation: Politician

Rajneesh Agrawal is an Indian politician from the Bharatiya Janata Party. He is a Member of Parliament, representing Madhya Pradesh in the Rajya Sabha the upper house of India's Parliament since June 2026.
