= Trimbak Damodar Pustake =

Indian politician

Member of Parliament, Rajya Sabha
- In office 1952-1960
- Constituency: Madhya Pradesh

Personal details
- Born: 10 June 1889
- Party: Indian National Congress

Trimbak Damodar Pustake was an Indian politician. He was a Member of Parliament representing Madhya Pradesh in the Rajya Sabha the upper house of India's Parliament as member of the Indian National Congress.
