= Dayaldas Kurre =

Indian politician (born 1923)

Member of Parliament, Rajya Sabha
- In office 1958–1970
- Constituency: Madhya Pradesh

Personal details
- Born: 15 September 1923
- Party: Indian National Congress

Dayaldas Kurre (born 15 September 1923) was an Indian politician. He was a Member of Parliament, representing Madhya Pradesh in the Rajya Sabha the upper house of India's Parliament as a member of the Indian National Congress.
