= Bheron Prasad =

Indian politician

Member of Parliament, Rajya Sabha
- In office 1952–1958
- Constituency: Madhya Pradesh

Personal details
- Born: 6 February 1900
- Party: Indian National Congress
- Spouse: Sheelavati Devi
- Children: 2 Sons and 1 daughter

Bheron Prasad was an Indian politician. He was a Member of Parliament, representing Madhya Pradesh in the Rajya Sabha the upper house of India's Parliament as a member of the Indian National Congress.
