= Ghufran Azam =

Indian politician

Member of Parliament, Lok Sabha
- In office 1980–1984
- Preceded by: Subhash Chandra Ahuja
- Succeeded by: Aslam Sher Khan
- Constituency: Betul

Member of Parliament, Rajya Sabha
- In office 1989–2000
- Constituency: Madhya Pradesh

Personal details
- Born: 1 July 1943
- Died: 2 April 2015
- Party: Indian National Congress
- Spouse: Vineeta Aza

Ghufran Azam was an Indian politician, elected to the Lok Sabha, the lower house of the Parliament of India as a member of the Indian National Congress.
