= Jyoti Waghmare =

Member of Parliament, Rajya Sabha
- Incumbent
- Assumed office 2026
- Constituency: Maharastra

Personal details
- Party: Shiv Sena

Jyoti Nagnath Waghmare is an Indian politician. She was elected to the Rajya Sabha from Maharastra as a member of the Shiv Sena.
