= Vishnu Vinayak Sarwate =

Indian politician

Vishnu Vinayak Sarwate is an Indian politician and member of the Indian National Congress. Sarwate was a member of the Madhya Pradesh Legislative Assembly. He was elected Deputy Chairman of Madhya Pradesh Legislative Assembly in 1956 and continued to hold the post till 1957. He was a member of the Rajya Sabha of the Indian Parliament from 1958 to 1964.
