= Kailash Soni =

Indian politician

Member of Parliament, Rajya Sabha
- In office 3 April 2018 – 2 April 2024
- Preceded by: La Ganesan
- Constituency: Madhya Pradesh

Personal details
- Born: 4 November 1950 (age 75) Kareli, Narsinghpur
- Party: Bharatiya Janata Party
- Spouse: Manju Soni
- Education: B.A, L.L.B.
- Profession: Agriculturist, Advocate, Politician

Kailash Soni (born 4 November 1950) was elected to the Rajya Sabha from Madhya Pradesh on 15 March 2018.
