= Manhar Bhagatram =

Indian politician (1938–2003)

Manhar Bhagatram (b. 22 October 1938; d 20–6–2003) was an Indian politician from Chhattisgarh belong to Indian National Congress. He studied Bachelor of Science in agriculture.

He was member of 5th Lok Sabha by winning by-elections in 1974 at Janjgir Lok Sabha constituency.

He was Member of Rajya Sabha for three terms, 10-4-1978 to 9–4–1984, 10-4-1984 to 9-4-1990 and 3-4-2000 to 31-10-2000 from Madhya Pradesh and 1-11-2000 to 20-6-2003 from Chhattisgarh. He was Treasurer of INC Party in Parliament.

He is survived by Shrimati Kamla Manhar, one daughter and one son.
