= Ratan Kumari =

Indian politician (1913–2003)

Ratan Kumari Devi

Member of Parliament, Rajya Sabha
- In office 3-4-1976–2-4-1994
- Constituency: Madhya Pradesh

Madhya Pradesh Legislative Assembly, MLA
- In office 1962–1976
- Preceded by: Narayan Singh
- Succeeded by: Ram Chandra Maheshwari
- Constituency: Pipariya

Personal details
- Born: Ratan Kumari; 13 December 1913
- Died: 16 April 2003 (aged 89) Bhopal
- Party: Indian National Congress

Ratan Kumari Devi was an Indian politician. She was a Member of Parliament, representing Madhya Pradesh in the Rajya Sabha the upper house of India's Parliament as a member of the Indian National Congress.
