= Anil Hegde =

Indian politician

Member of Parliament of Rajya Sabha
- In office 30 May 2022 – 3 April 2024
- Preceded by: Mahendra Prasad
- Succeeded by: B. Singh
- Constituency: Bihar

Personal details
- Born: Mangaluru, Karnataka, india
- Party: Janata Dal (United)

Anil Hegde is an Indian politician from Janata Dal (United) party, a Member of the Parliament of India representing Bihar in the Rajya Sabha elected from bypoll due to the death of Pharmaceutical Baron and seven time Parliamentarian Mahendra Prasad.
