= Jagatpal Singh Thakur =

Indian politician

Samiulla Khan

Member of Parliament Rajya Sabha
- In office 1984–1990
- Constituency: Madhya Pradesh

Personal details
- Born: 11 March 1923
- Died: 21 October 1999 (aged 76)
- Party: Indian National Congress
- Spouse: Vidya Vati

Jagatpal Singh Thakur (1923–1999) was an Indian politician. He was a Member of Parliament, representing Madhya Pradesh in the Rajya Sabha the upper house of India's Parliament representing the Indian National Congress.
