= Sanjay Yadav (Bihar politician) =

Member of Rajya Sabha from Bihar (born 1984)

Member of Parliament, Rajya Sabha
- Incumbent
- Assumed office 3 April 2024
- Preceded by: Ashfaque Karim
- Constituency: Bihar

Personal details
- Born: 24 February 1984 (age 42) Nangal Sirohi, Haryana, India
- Party: Rashtriya Janata Dal (since 2012)
- Domestic partner: Sunishtha Yadav
- Children: 3 (1 son & 2 daughters)
- Education: MBA
- Alma mater: Makhanlal Chaturvedi National University of Journalism and Communication (M.Sc)
- Occupation: Politician, advisor

Sanjay Yadav (born 24 February 1984) is an Indian politician from Haryana, who has been serving as Member of Parliament, Rajya Sabha from Bihar since 2024. He is a member of Rashtriya Janata Dal (RJD), and known as a senior political advisor to its leader Tejashwi Yadav, son of Lalu Prasad Yadav.

== Early life ==
Yadav was born on 24 February 1984 at Nangal Sirohi village of Mahendragarh in Haryana. His father's name is Prabhati Lal and mother is Basanti Devi. In 2007, he completed his studies by earning a Master of Science degree in Computer Science at Makhanlal Chaturvedi National University of Journalism and Communication in Bhopal, Madhya Pradesh.

Yadav worked with three multinational corporations in Delhi until 2010. He devotes the majority of his time to data analysis and analyzing the state's political and social equation.

== Political career ==
Yadav met Tejashwi when the latter was an Indian Premier League player from Delhi Daredevils team. He had also closely associated working with Samajwadi Party leader Akhilesh Yadav.

He joined RJD in 2012. He helped the party to rise during 2015 and 2020 election in Bihar and closed associate of Tejashwi. In 2021, Tejaswi's brother Tej Pratap had called him an NRI, which sparked controversy.

Yadav was summoned by the Central Bureau of Investigation (CBI) to ask questions related to Bihar land scam. He was elected to Rajya Sabha in 2024.

== Personal life ==
Yadav is married to Sunishtha since 20 June 2014 and they have a son and 2 daughter Miraya Rao and Tanya Rao.
