= Mayankbhai Nayak =

Indianpolitician

Member of Parliament, Rajya Sabha from Gujarat
- Incumbent
- Assumed office 3 April 2024
- Preceded by: Amee Yajnik

Personal details
- Party: Bharatiya Janata Party
- Education: Diploma in mechanical engineer
- Occupation: Politician, businessman

Mayankbhai Nayak is an Indian politician from Gujarat who is serving as member of Rajya Sabha from Gujarat, representing Bharatiya Janata Party, since 2024.

== Education ==
Nayak holds a diploma in mechanical engineer.

== Career ==
Nayak started his political career in 1992. He has been elected as member of Mehsana Taluka Panchayat in Lakhvad.

In addition to leading the state party OBC Morcha, Nayak currently oversees the Gandhinagar Lok Sabha seat, which is held by Union Home Minister Amit Shah. He had previously served as the party's representative for the Patan Lok Sabha seat and district.

He served as member of Rashtriya Swayamsevak Sangh and became a trustee of Shamlaji Vishnu Temple.
