= Pyarelal Khandelwal =

Indian politician

Pyarelal Khandelwal (6 April 1925 – 6 October 2009) was a Rashtriya Swayamsevak Sangh pracharak and Bharatiya Janata Party politician in India.

== Career ==
He served as a member of the Parliament of India representing Madhya Pradesh in the Rajya Sabha, the upper house of the Indian Parliament.

Khandelwal beat Digvijay Singh in the Indian general election of 1989, being returned as the member for the Rajgarh Lok Sabha constituency.

== Death ==
Khandelwal died following a cardiac arrest on 6 October 2009. He was 84 years old and had been suffering from cancer.
