= Maimoona Sultan =

Indian politician

- Born: 1932
- Died: 2006 (aged 73–74)
- Occupation: Member of Parliament

Maimoona Sultan (1932–2006) was a member of the Parliament of India and belonged to the Indian National Congress. She was elected to the second and third Lok Sabha from Bhopal. She was member of the Rajya Sabha from April 1974 to April 1980 and from June 1980 to June 1986.
