= Nand Kishore Bhatt =

Indian politician (1919–2013)

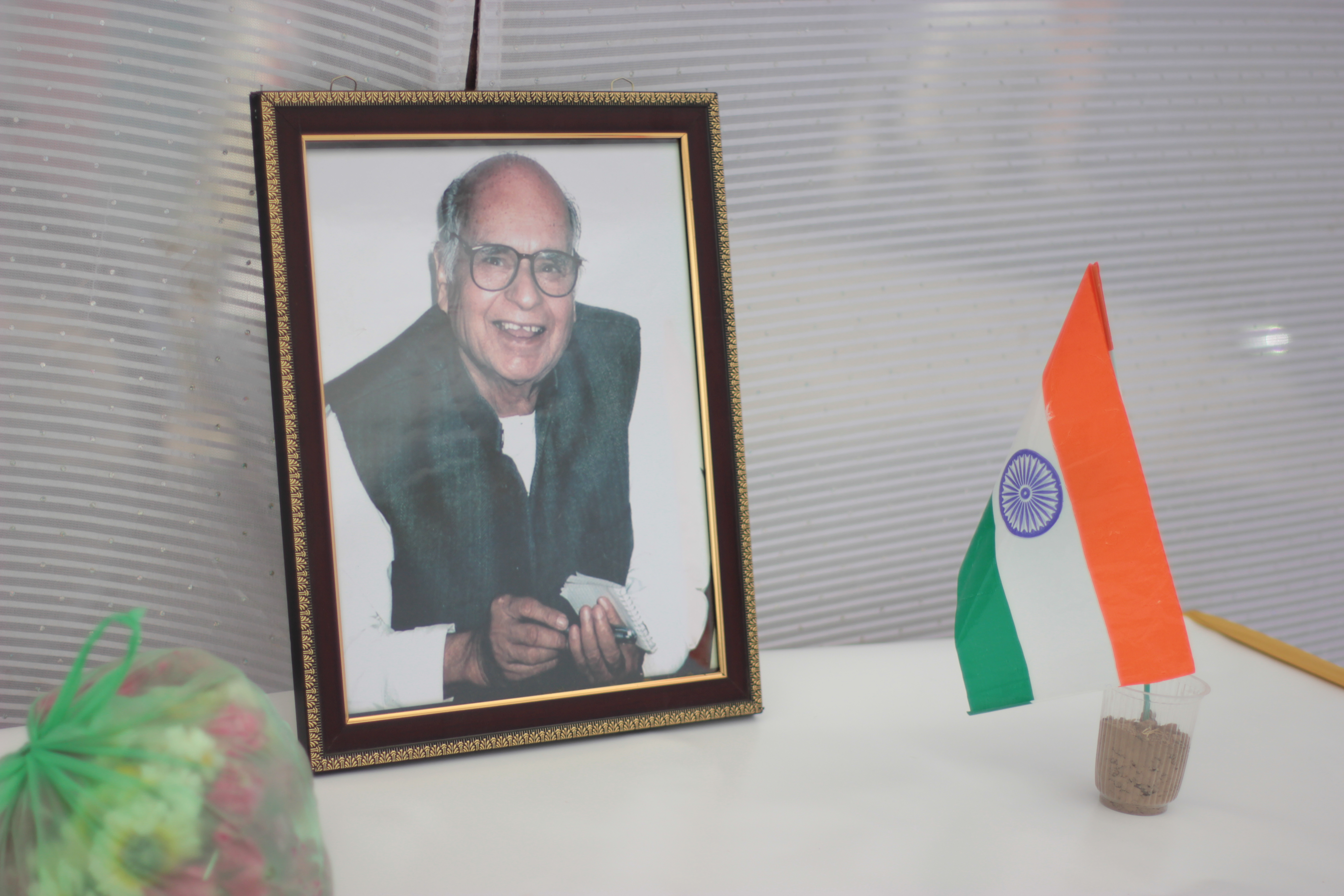

Member of Parliament, Rajya Sabha
- In office MP – 1966–72, 1972–78, 1980–86
- Constituency: Madhya Pradesh

INTUC (Indian National Trade Union Congress) President
- In office 1980–1984

CLEAR (Centre for Labour Education and Social Research)
- In office 1986–2013

Personal details
- Born: 17 December 1919 Shajapur, Gwalior State, British India
- Died: 14 January 2013 (aged 93) New Delhi, India
- Party: Indian National Congress
- Spouse: Smt. Tara Priyadarshini Bhatt
- Children: Anama Acharya, Dr. Anjana Raval, Aparna Trivedi, Anupam Bhatt

Nand Kishore Bhatt (17 December 1919 –14 January 2013) was an Indian politician. He was a Member of Parliament representing Madhya Pradesh in the Rajya Sabha, the upper house of India's Parliament as member of the Indian National Congress. In his tribute read out in Rajya Sabha by the then vice president, Dr. Hamid Ansari, he was described as a distinguished parliamentarian, trade unionist, and a veteran freedom fighter.

== Early life ==
Bhatt was born in Shajapur, Madhya Pradesh on 17 December 1919, to Shri Sidhnathji Bhatt. When in eighth grade, his father asked him to drop out of school and join his other brothers in their farming practice. Bhatt did not want to discontinue his education but wanted to study further and also join the freedom struggle as India was then ruled by the British. Therefore, he left home and went to the city of Indore, which had better schools and gave him an opportunity to join the freedom struggle. He completed his education including a BA and law degree. His alma mater included Christian College – DAV University – Indore, Madhav College – Ujjain, Agra University, Nagpur University and Delhi University.

== Freedom struggle ==
A freedom fighter and a trade unionist, Bhatt actively participated in the freedom struggle and was imprisoned during the Quit India Movement.

== Political career ==
=== Parliamentarian (MP, Rajya Sabha) ===
Bhatt represented the State of Madhya Pradesh in the upper house, Rajya Sabha, from April 1966 to April 1972; from April 1972 to April 1978; and, again from June 1980 to June 1986. He contested the Lok Sabha election in 1977 from the Indore constituency after the emergency and lost the election by one of the most narrow margins.

=== Trade unionist ===
Bhatt was associated with the INTUC (Indian National Trade Union Congress) since its inception in 1947 and held various positions in that organisation. He served as its president from 1980 to 1984. Throughout his life, he was actively involved in welfare activities for labourers, miners and workers in various sectors. He was chairman of the Joint Committee on the Plantations Labour Bill during 1974 to 1975.

Bhatt visited the United States of America and Japan to study the productivity movement and industrial relations systems in these countries. He was the Leader of the Indian Delegation Young Workers Conference at Casablanca, Morocco, in 1962. Bhatt had attended various International Conferences on labour welfare and trade unions notably the International Confederation of Free Trade Unions (ICFTU) Congress at Vienna in 1955 and at London in 1972; ILO Conferences at Geneva in 1955, 1972 and 1973 and Eighth Constitutional Convention of the American Federation of Labour and Congress of Industrial Organisations (AFICO) in Los Angeles in 1977. He was also a delegate to the Twenty-First Commonwealth Parliamentary Conference in 1975. In September 1964, a delegation consisting of Bhatt and two journalists – Mr. SR Mohan Das from the Economic Times, and Mr. Raghuvir Desai from Majoor Sandesh, Ahmedabad visited England to meet with Frank Cousins, the general secretary of Transport and General Workers Union

He was also strongly associated with the unions of MOIL (Manganese Ore (India) Limited) and WCL (Western Coal Fields). He was also associated with DPC (Delhi Productivity Council) and NPC (National Productivity Council).

== Post-retirement ==
After retiring from politics, Bhatt started his own social service organization called CLEAR or Center for Labour Education and Social Research. The organization was based out of his residence in Delhi and had an office in Bilaspur, MP (now Chhattisgarh). He served as part of this until his death in 2013. He was revered as a freedom fighter on several occasions by Dr. APJ Abdul Kalam and PV Narasimha Rao.

== Personal life ==
Bhatt married Tara Vyas in 1945. They had four children - three daughters and one son. Bhatt was a voracious reader who keenly read all Hindu epics frequently. He consistently practiced Yoga and took keen interest in Indian music including playing the Sitar. He suffered a stroke during an Angiogram. He earlier had bypass surgery in 1999. As a result, while he was still able to perform all routine tasks, his eyesight significantly deteriorated affecting his ability to read. He died in his sleep on 14 January 2013. He was survived by his 4 children, 10 grandchildren and 12 great grandchildren.
