= Naveen Jain (politician) =

Indian politician from Uttar Pradesh

Member of Parliament, Rajya Sabha from Uttar Pradesh
- Incumbent
- Assumed office 3 April 2024
- Preceded by: Anil Jain

Other offices
- 2017-2022: Mayor of Agra
- 2019-2022: President of All India Council of Mayors

Personal details
- Party: Bharatiya Janata Party
- Education: Dr. Bhimrao Ambedkar University (2007)

Naveen Jain is an Indian politician from Uttar Pradesh representing Uttar Pradesh in Rajya Sabha. A member of Bharatiya Janata Party, he has served as mayor of Agra from 2017 until 2022.

== Biography ==
Jain was graduated from Dr. Bhimrao Ambedkar University in Agra in the year 2007.

== Career ==
Jain was elected as mayor of Agra in 2017 municipal elections. During his swearing-in-ceremony, all 9 MLAs boycotted from the state, claiming humiliation in the presence of Deputy Chief Minister Dinesh Sharma. They told when they reached the ceremony ground, MLAs were allegedly asked to clear the stage and sit below, angering them.

In 2019, Jain welcomed US President Donald Trump by gifting him a 'key of the Agra city' which is made of silver.

During the coronavirus epidemic in 2020, Jain requested to the Union Government that the nation's historical sites, including the Taj Mahal, be closed indefinitely until the situation was under control.

In June 2022, Jain proposed a large-scale event to celebrate Agra's "birthday" with a lavish celebration, but there's no set date. A nine-person committee will determine the exact year of Agra's founding, visiting various parts of the city and consulting historians and historical texts to find the date. The event will be held annually on that occasion.

Jain was elected to Rajya Sabha in February 2024. He is the richest member in the house with assets worth Rs 441 crore which he shares with his wife.

== Controversies ==
In 2019, Jain has raised a storm in the teacup by calling the Aligarh Muslim University (AMU) a "hub of terrorists". His remarks infuriated a number of former AMU students. They demanded that Jain apologize to the students for branding them terrorists.

In 2022, Jain informed all mayors that if there is an Aurangzeb plaque or a road named after him, it must be destroyed. He said that Aurangzeb "was a cruel ruler who destroyed Hindu temples..." and forced Hindus "to convert to Islam".
