= Jasvantsinh Parmar =

Indian politician from Gujarat (born 1977)

Dr.Jasvantsinh Salamsinh Parmar

Member of Parliament, Rajya Sabha
- Incumbent
- Assumed office 3 April 2024
- Preceded by: Naranbhai Rathwa
- Constituency: Gujarat

Personal details
- Born: 1977 (age 48–49) Gujarat, India
- Party: Bharatiya Janata Party
- Education: B. J. Medical College, Ahmedabad
- Occupation: Politician, Surgeon

Dr.Jasvantsinh Salamsinh Parmar is an Indian politician and former surgeon who is serving as member of Rajya Sabha from Gujarat since 2024, representing Bharatiya Janata Party.

== Early life ==
=== Birth ===
Parmar was born in 1977 in Godhra, Gujarat. Parmar’s parents were also affiliated with the BJP. His father, Salamsinh, was a school principal and an active member of the BJP and was elected to the taluka panchayat twice. Parmar’s mother, Lalitaben, was elected to the district panchayat thrice and had also held the post of chairperson of the health committee of the panchayat.

=== Education ===
Dr.Parmar holds MBBS MS (General Surgery) degrees from BJ Medical College Gujrat University, Ahemdabad.

== Career ==
Parmar, a general surgeon from Godhra in Panchmahal, is a well-known BJP leader. In the 2017 Assembly elections, the 47-year-old revolted against the party and ran as an independent against current MLA C.K. Raulji, polling 10.54 percent of the vote from the Godhra seat. The contest resulted in a five-year expulsion from the party. Nevertheless, he returned to the party in 2022.

He was elected unopposed to the Rajya Sabha in 2024 along with his colleagues.
