= Ajit Gopchade =

Member of Parliament, Rajya Sabha from Maharashtra

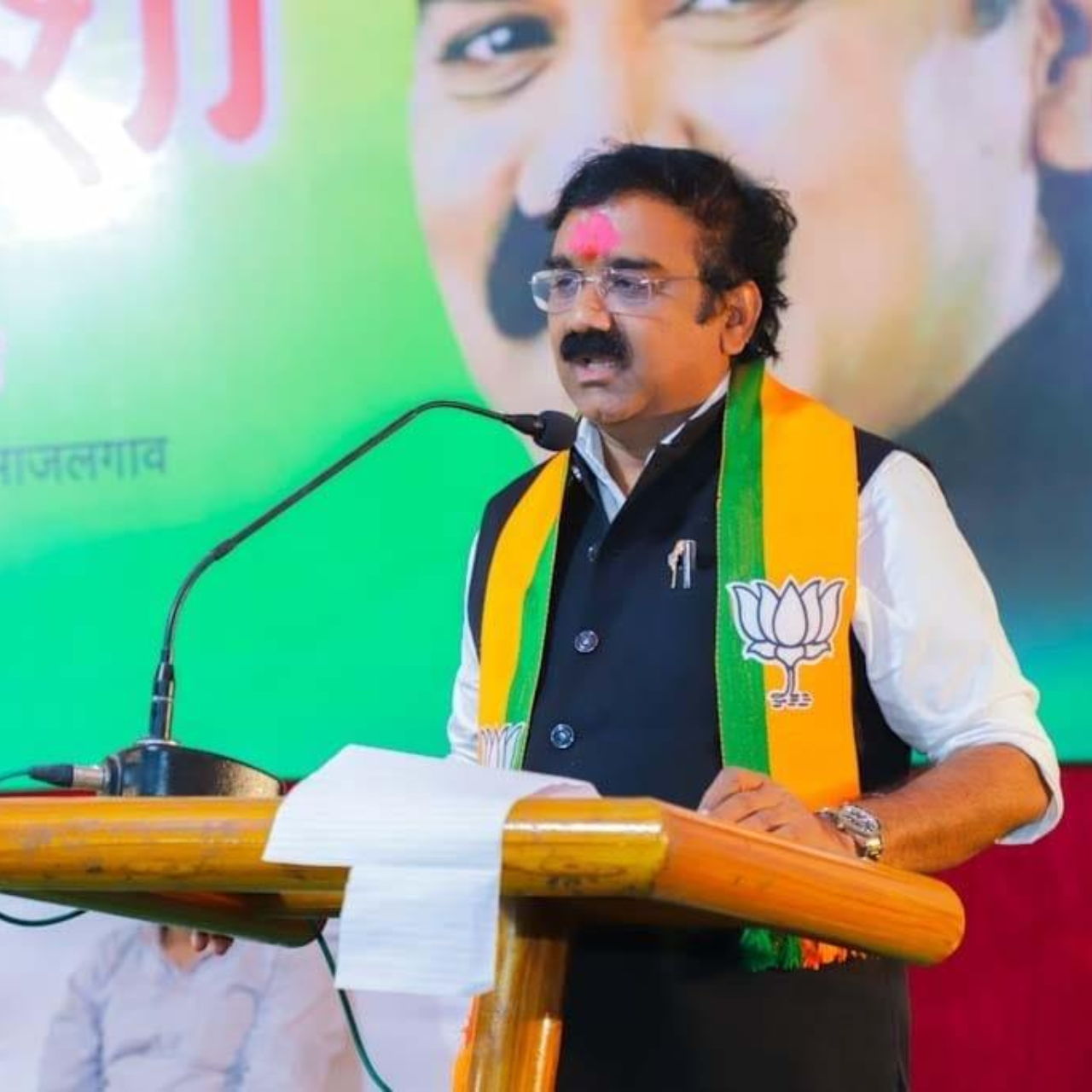

Member of Parliament, Rajya Sabha
- Incumbent
- Assumed office 3 April 2024
- Preceded by: V. Muraleedharan
- Constituency: Maharashtra

Personal details
- Born: 19 November 1970 (age 55) Nanded, Nanded district, Maharashtra
- Party: Bharatiya Janata Party
- Spouse: Chetna Gopchade (m. 1999)
- Children: 1 son, 1 daughter
- Parents: Madhavrao Gopchade (father); Rukminibai Gopchade (mother)
- Education: M.B.B.S., M.D. (Paediatrics)
- Alma mater: Swami Ramanand Teerth Rural Medical College; Government Medical College, Aurangabad
- Profession: Doctor, Politician

Dr. Ajit Madhavrao Gopchade is an Indian politician and activist from Maharashra, who is serving as Member of Parliament, Rajya Sabha from Maharashtra state since 2024. He is representing Bharatiya Janata Party.

== Early career ==
In 1992, Gopchade has finished his study on MBBS and joined with a group of over 300 Hindutva youth activists to Ayodhya for "karseva," or serving Lord Ram. He admitted that he was in the widely shared 6 December 1992, picture of a group of young people gleefully standing atop one of the Babri Masjit's three domes.

== Political career ==
After completing his M.D. at a government medical college, he joined the BJP and functioned as the convener of the party's doctors' cell. He was then elevated to the position of party vice-president in the state.

Because of his capacity to organize and his proactive involvement in setting up medical camps during COVID-19, the BJP has suggested that he run for the Maharashtra Legislative Council elections in May 2020. But at the last moment, his name was omitted.

== Rajya Sabha member (2024–present) ==
In 2024, he was nominated to Rajya Sabha from Maharashtra by BJP along with his colleagues Medha Kulkarni and Ashok Chavan.
