= Bhim Singh (Bihar politician) =

Member of Parliament, Rajya Sabha from Bihar (born 1962)

Member of Parliament, Rajya Sabha
- Incumbent
- Assumed office 3 April 2024
- Preceded by: Anil Hegde
- Constituency: Bihar

Cabinet Minister Government of Bihar
- In office 2010–2015
- Chief Minister: Nitish Kumar; Jitan Ram Manjhi
- Ministry or Departments: Rural Works; Road Construction; Panchayati Raj; Industries; Sugarcane

Member of Bihar Legislative Council
- In office 2006–2015
- Elected By: Member of Legislative Assembly
- Succeeded by: Chandeshwar Prasad

Personal details
- Born: 30 November 1962 (age 63) Bedauli, Gaya, Bihar, India
- Party: Bharatiya Janata Party (since 2015)
- Other political affiliations: Janata Dal (United) (2009 - 2015); Rashtriya Janata Dal (before 2009)
- Education: B.Sc., M. A., LL.B., Ph.D..
- Alma mater: Patna University

Bhim Singh Chandravanshi (born 30 November 1962) is an Indian educationist and politician who has been serving as a Member of Parliament, Rajya Sabha from Bihar since 2024. A member of the Bharatiya Janata Party since 2015, he holds the position of vice president of the BJP in the state of Bihar.

Prior to that, he served as a cabinet minister under the cabinets of Nitish Kumar and Jitan Ram Manjhi from 2012 until his resignation in 2015. He also served as a member of the Bihar Vidhan Parishad for three consecutive terms from 2006 to 2015.

== Education ==
He has earned Bachelor of Science in engineering, two Master of Arts, a law (LLB) bachelor and doctorate from Patna University.

== Political career ==
He was active in Patna University as a student and employee leader. During this time, he developed associations with former Bihar CM Karpuri Thakur and grew closer to Lalu Prasad Yadav, Ram Vilas Paswan, and Nitish Kumar.

He assumed the role in the formation of Janata Dal as General Secretary. He also co-founded the formation of the Samata Party along with Nitish Kumar.

Later, he joined RJD and became the state general secretary of the party. He defected to JDU in 2009 and joined the BJP in 2015.

== Controversies ==
Singh found himself in the center of controversy when he said that people who joined the army either died or became martyrs. He made this statement on a day when the four Bihar army officers who had died were being cremated with full state honors in front of hundreds of mourners. His party did not take kindly to the statement and quickly distanced itself from it.
