= M. Anil Kumar Yadav =

Indian politician

Mandadi Anil Kumar Yadav
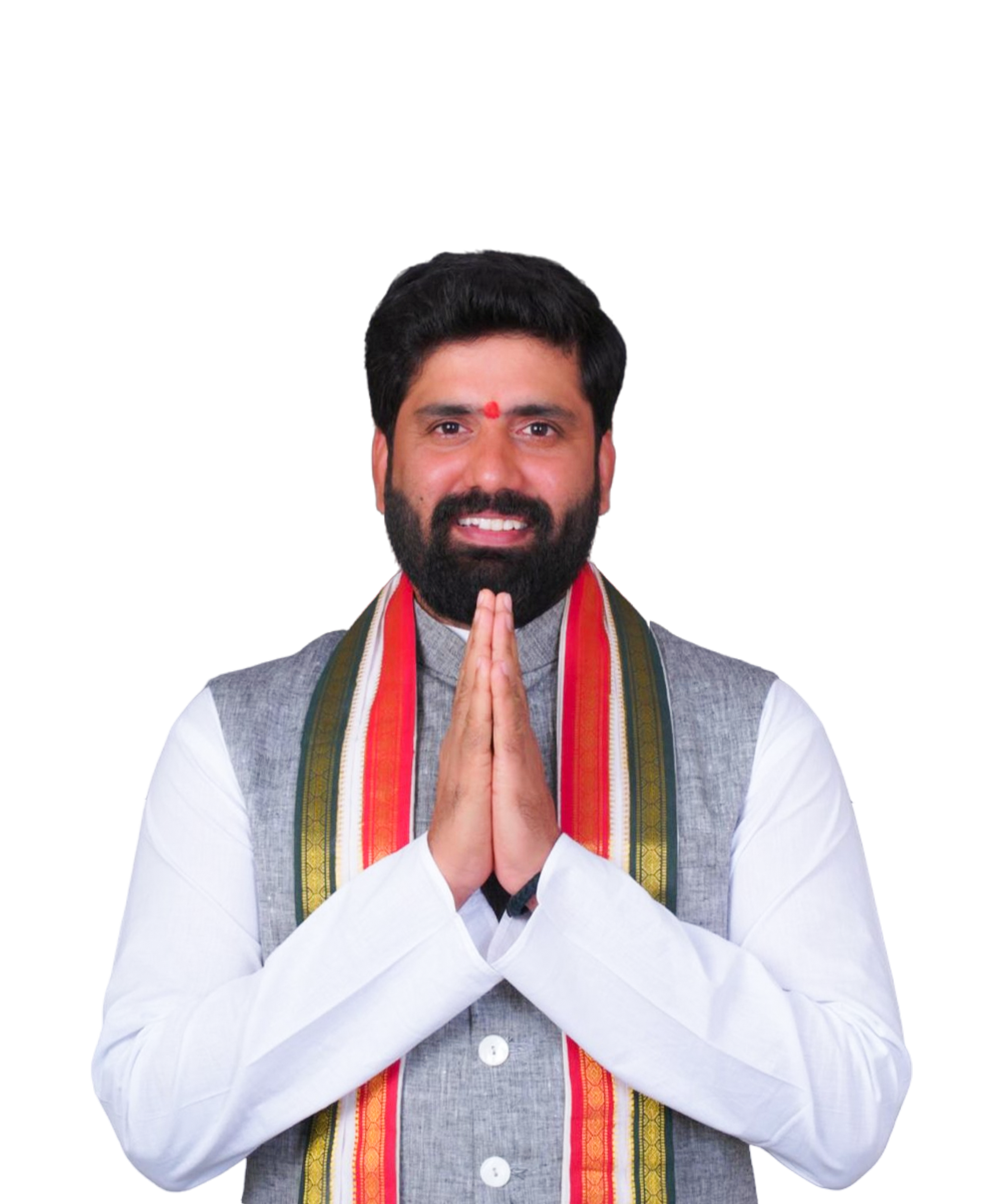
- Mandadi Anil Kumar Yadav

Member of Parliament, Rajya Sabha
- Incumbent
- Assumed office 3 April 2024
- Preceded by: Joginapally Santosh Kumar
- Constituency: Telangana

Personal details
- Born: 9 September 1982 (age 44) Hyderabad, Telangana, India
- Party: Indian National Congress
- Spouse: Shrimati Devika Yadav
- Children: 2
- Education: B.Com., LL.B.
- Profession: Lawyer, Politician, Social Worker, Sportsperson

Mandadi Anil Kumar Yadav is an Indian politician from the state of Telangana and a member of Indian National Congress. He is a member of Rajya Sabha from Telangana. He has earlier served as a Telangana Youth Congress president.

== Early life and education ==
Anil Kumar Yadav was born on 9 September 1982 in Hyderabad, Telangana, to Shri M. Anjan Kumar Yadav Mandadi (father) and Shrimati Nagamani (mother). His father, Anjan Kumar Yadav, served as the Member of Parliament for Secunderabad from 2004 to 2014, representing the Indian National Congress (INC) party. Anil Kumar Yadav pursued his education at Osmania University, Hyderabad, earning a degree in Bachelor of Commerce (B.Com.) and Bachelor of Laws (LL.B.).

== Political career ==
=== Member of Parliament (Rajya Sabha) ===
Mandadi Anil Kumar Yadav was elected as a Member of Parliament (Rajya Sabha) from the state of Telangana. He assumed office on 3 April 2024, succeeding Joginapally Santosh Kumar.

=== Political Leadership and Positions ===
- DCC President, Secunderabad, Telangana.
- Former General Secretary, Indian Youth Congress.
- First Elected State President, Telangana Youth Congress.
- Former Elected State Vice President, Andhra Pradesh Youth Congress.

=== Committee Appointments ===
- Member, Committee on Coal, Mines and Steel. (September 2024 onwards).
- Member, Committee on Papers Laid on the Table. (October 2024 onwards).
- Member, Committee on Information and Communication Technology Management in Rajya Sabha.
- Member, Consultative Committee for the Ministry of Micro, Small and Medium Enterprises.

== Personal life ==
Mandadi Anil Kumar Yadav is married to Shrimati Devika Yadav since 22 November 2009. The couple has two children.He is best friends with Sania Mirza and Lavraj Bhalerao
