= Haris Beeran =

Indian politician

Member of Parliament, Rajya Sabha
- Incumbent
- Assumed office 2 July 2024
- Preceded by: Elamaram Kareem
- Constituency: Kerala

Personal details
- Party: Indian Union Muslim League

Haris Beeran(haaːris biiːraaːn)is an Indian lawyer and politician who was elected to Rajya Sabha from Kerala State nominated by Indian Union Muslim League. Mr. Beeran has represented the IUML on various cases in the Supreme Court including the one against the Citizenship Amendment Act.
