= Ajay Pratap Singh (Madhya Pradesh politician) =

Indian politician (born 1967)

Member of Parliament, Rajya Sabha
- In office April 2018 – April 2024
- Constituency: Madhya Pradesh

Personal details
- Born: 28 April 1967 (age 58) Sidhi, Madhya Pradesh
- Spouse: Anita Singh
- Children: 1
- Education: Post Graduation
- Alma mater: S.G.S. College, Sidhi

Ajay Pratap Singh (born 28 April 1967) is an Indian politician and one of the senior most leader of Madhya pradesh BJP unit. He was elected to the Rajya Sabha from Madhya Pradesh on 15 March 2018. Earlier He also worked as State General Secretary, Vice president and Secretary of BJP Madhya Pradesh Organisation. In 2011 he Also Worked as a chairman(Cabinet Minister Rank)of Vindhya Development Authority.
