= Dharmshila Gupta =

Member of Parliament, Rajya Sabha from Bihar (born 1969)

Member of Parliament, Rajya Sabha
- Incumbent
- Assumed office 3 April 2024
- Preceded by: Sushil Kumar Modi
- Constituency: Bihar

Personal details
- Born: 27 November 1969 (age 56) Ghoghardiha, Madhubani district, Bihar, India
- Party: Bharatiya Janata Party
- Spouse: Parshuram Gupta (m. 1983)
- Children: 2 sons, 2 daughters
- Parents: Asharfi Lal Sah (father); Bimla Devi (mother)
- Education: B.Ed., M.Sc.(Botany), Ph.D.
- Alma mater: Lalit Narayan Mithila University
- Profession: Educationist, Politician

Dharamshila Gupta (born 1969) is an Indian politician who has been serving as a Member of Parliament, Rajya Sabha from Bihar since 2024.

== Early life ==
Dharamshila Gupta was born in Darbhanga, Bihar in 1969.

== Political career ==
In February 2024, Gupta was nominated by the Bharatiya Janata Party and was elected unopposed as Member of Parliament, Rajya Sabha in place of Sushil Modi from Bihar.
