= Maya Naroliya =

Indian politician

Member of Parliament, Rajya Sabha
- Incumbent
- Assumed office 2024
- Constituency: Madhya Pradesh

Personal details
- Party: Bharatiya Janata Party

Maya Naroliya is an Indian politician. She is a Member of Parliament, representing Madhya Pradesh in the Rajya Sabha the upper house of India's Parliament as a member of the Bharatiya Janata Party.
