= Narayana Bhandage =

Indian politician

Member of Parliament, Rajya Sabha
- Incumbent
- Assumed office 3 April 2024
- Preceded by: Rajeev Chandrasekhar
- Constituency: Karnataka

Member of Karnataka Legislative Council
- In office 15 June 2010 – 14 June 2016
- Constituency: elected by Legislative Members

Personal details
- Born: 21 November 1951 (age 73); Solapur, Maharashtra
- Spouse: Vimala
- Children: 2 sons, 3 daughters
- Parent: Krishnasa (father)

Narayansa Krishnasa Bhandage is an Indian politician from Bharatiya Janata Party, Karnataka who has been a member of Rajya Sabha from 3 April 2024.

== Career ==
He had earlier served as the member of Karnataka Legislative Council from 2010 to 2016. He also held various positions in the BJP Karnataka organization - Bagalkot District General Secretary, Bagalkot District President, Bijapur Yuva Morcha President, State BJP Secretary, State BJP Vice President.
