= Subhashish Khuntia =

Indian politician

MP of Rajya Sabha for List of Rajya Sabha members from Odisha
- Incumbent
- Assumed office 2024
- Constituency: Odisha

Personal details
- Party: Biju Janata Dal

Subhashish Khuntia is an Indian politician. He is a Member of Parliament, representing Odisha in the Rajya Sabha the upper house of India's Parliament as a member of the Biju Janata Dal.
