= Member of Parliament, Rajya Sabha =

Member of the upper house of the Indian Parliament

- Logo of The Rajya Sabha

- Flag of India
- Ministry of Parliamentary Affairs
- Style: Honourable (Inside India); His/Her Excellency (Outside India)
- Type: Upper house of the Parliament of India
- Status: Active
- Abbreviation: MP
- Member of: Rajya Sabha
- Reports to: Chairman of Rajya Sabha & Deputy Chairman of Rajya Sabha
- Seat: Parliament of India
- Nominator: President of India on the advice of Council of Ministers (in case of nominated MPs)
- Appointer: Vice President of India
- Term length: 6 years; renewable
- Constituting instrument: Fourth Schedule to the Constitution of India
- Formation: 26 January 1950; 76 years ago
- First holder: 1952
- Salary: ₹124,000 (US$1,300) (incl. allowances) per month
- Website: sansad.in/rs

A Member of Parliament in the Rajya Sabha (abbreviated: MP) is the representative of the Indian states to the upper house of the Parliament of India which is known as Rajya Sabha (constitutionally "Council of States"). Rajya Sabha MPs are elected by the electoral college of the elected members of the State Assembly with a system of proportional representation by a single transferable vote. The Parliament of India is bicameral with two houses; Rajya Sabha (Upper house i.e. Council of States) and the Lok Sabha (Lower house i.e. House of the People). Compared to the Lok Sabha, the Rajya Sabha has fewer members and its members have more restricted power. Unlike the Lok Sabha, the Rajya Sabha is a permanent body and cannot be dissolved at any time. However, every second year, one third of the members are retired and the vacancies are filled by fresh elections and Presidential nomination at the beginning of every third year.

All members of Rajya Sabha rank 21st in the Order of Precedence of India.

== Responsibilities of the members of parliament ==
Broad responsibilities of the members of parliament of Rajya Sabha are:

- Legislative responsibility: To pass Laws of India in the Rajya Sabha.
- Oversight responsibility: To ensure that the executive (i.e. government) performs its duties satisfactorily.
- Representative responsibility: To represent the views and aspirations of the people of their constituency in the Parliament of India (Rajya Sabha).
- Power of the purse responsibility: To approve and oversee the revenues and expenditures proposed by the government.
- The Union Council of Ministers, who are also members of parliament have an additional responsibility of the executive as compared to those who are not in the Council of Ministers.

=== Special powers ===
Members of Parliament in the Rajya Sabha enjoy special powers and responsibilities with regard to:

- Making laws on any subject in the State List;
- Making laws to create services at national level.
- Supreme court judges tenure variable

== Term ==
Unlike Lok Sabha, Rajya Sabha can not be dissolved and is a permanent body, therefore members usually get chances to serve their full tenure unless they resign or vacate the seat due to death. One third of its members retire every two years. So each member has a term of six years

== Qualifications for being a member of parliament ==
A person must satisfy all following conditions to be qualified to become a member of parliament of the Rajya Sabha:

- Must be a citizen of India
- 30 years of age

== Disqualifications for being a member of parliament ==
A person would be ineligible for being a Member of the Rajya Sabha if the person:

- Holds any office of profit under the Government of India (other than an office permitted by Parliament of India by law).
- Is of unsound mind.
- Is an undischarged insolvent.
- Has ceased to be a citizen of India.
- Is so disqualified by any law made by the Indian Parliament.
- Is so disqualified on the ground of defection.
- Has been convicted, among other things, for promoting enmity between different groups.
- Has been convicted for offence of bribery.
- Has been punished for preaching and practicing social crimes such as untouchability, dowry, sati.
- Has been convicted for an offence and sentenced to imprisonment.
- Has been dismissed for corruption or for disloyalty to the State (in case of a government servant).

== Composition/strength ==
Membership in the Rajya Sabha is limited to 250 members, and up to 238 members are elected by the members of all the Vidhan Sabhas (individual state legislatures) and up to 12 are nominated by the President for their contributions to art, literature, science, and social services. The strength can be lower than 250: the current one is at 245. (See next section on members.)

== See also ==
- Member of parliament, Lok Sabha
- List of current members of the Rajya Sabha
- Parliament of India
