= 2012 Rajya Sabha elections =

Elections for the upper house of Indian Parliament

66 seats to the Rajya Sabha (Note: Including 2 casual vacancies)
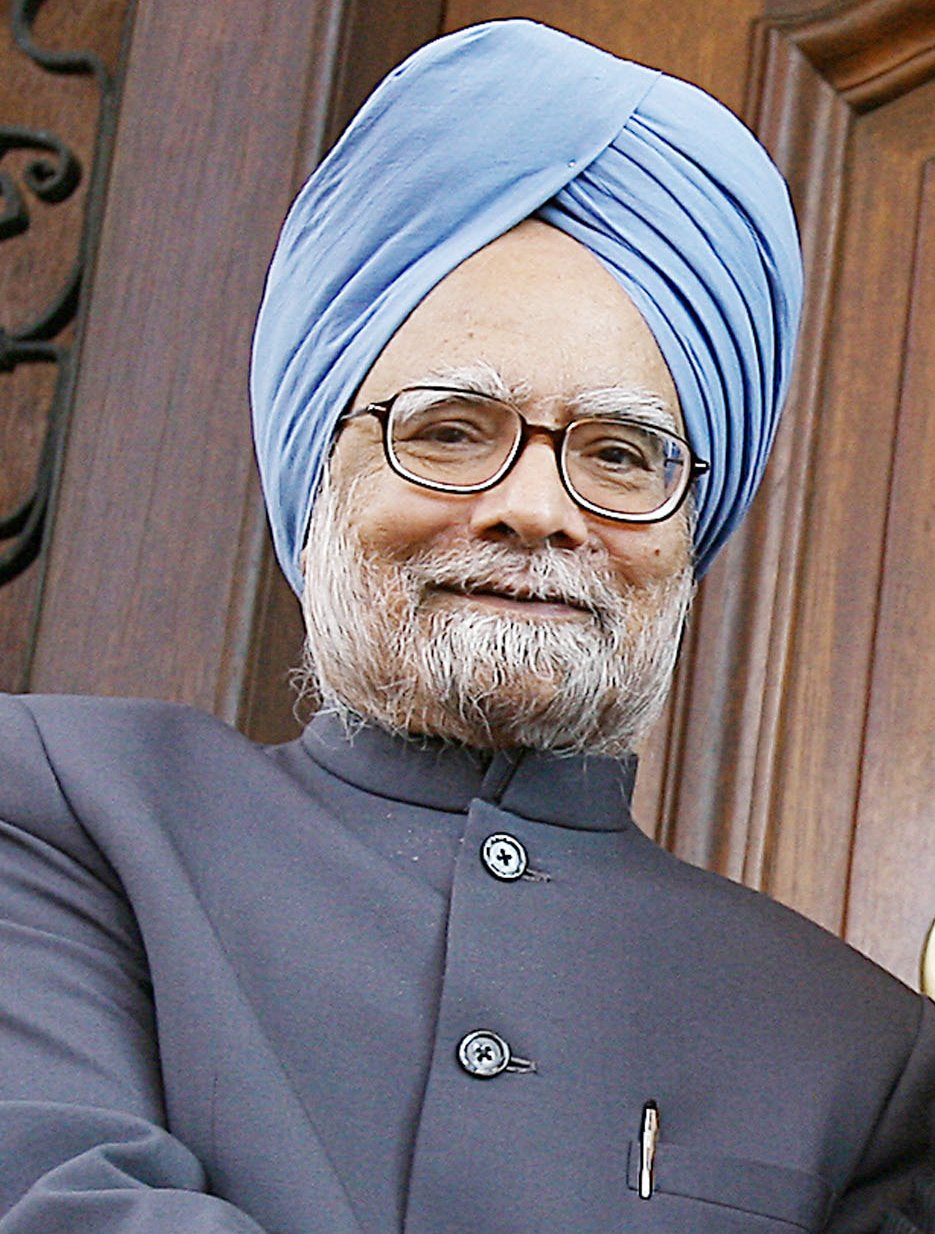

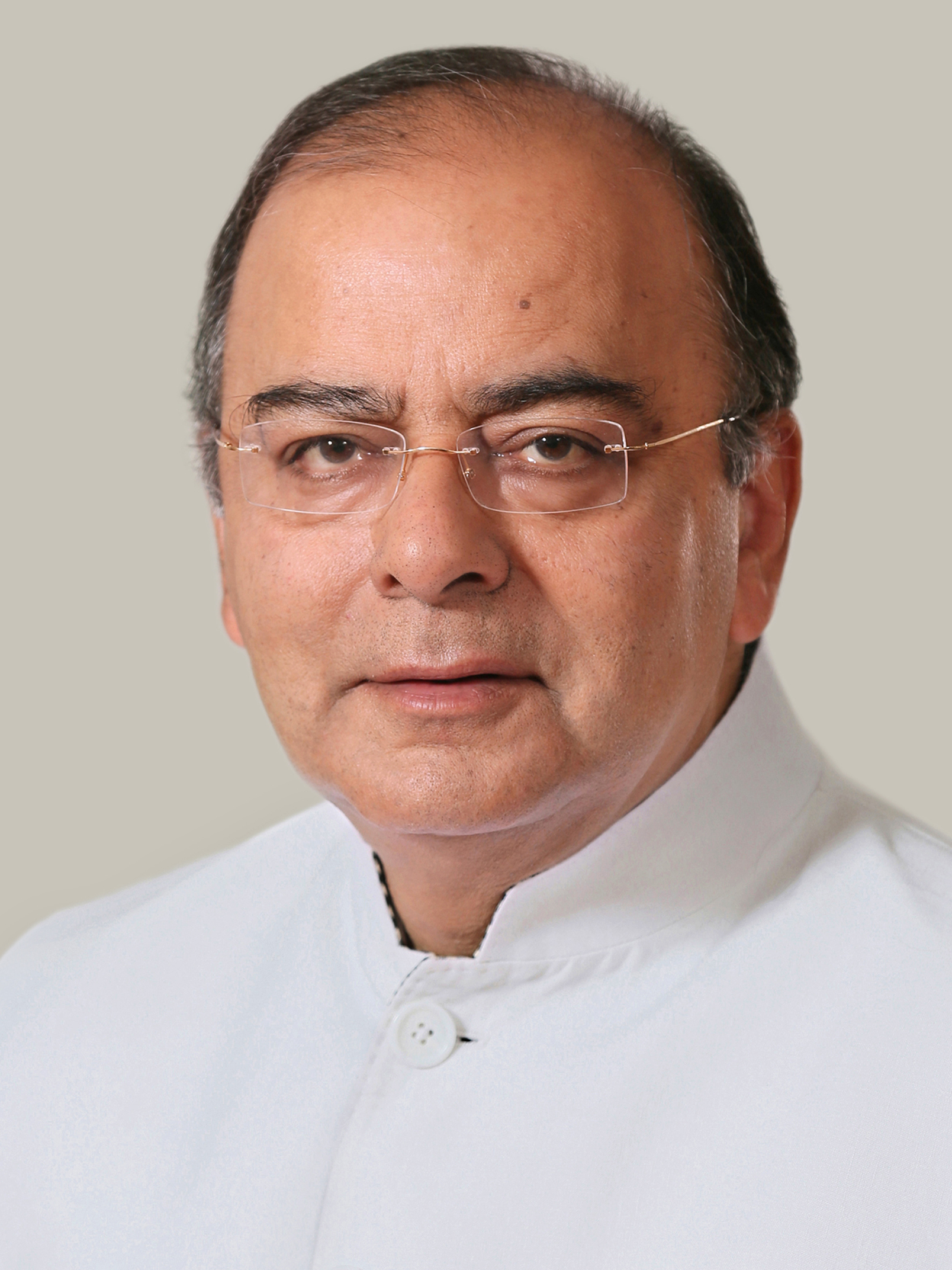
	First party	Second party
Leader	Manmohan Singh	Arun Jaitley
Party	INC	BJP

Rajya Sabha elections were held on various dates in 2012, to elect members of the Rajya Sabha, Indian Parliament's upper chamber. The elections were held in January to elect respectively 3 members from NCT of Delhi, one member from Sikkim, and in March for 57 members from 15 States for the Rajya Sabha and in June for three members from Kerala.

The bye-elections to Council of States were also held from the States of Uttar Pradesh and Maharashtra.

== January Elections ==
=== NCT of Delhi ===
Seat No	Previous MP	Previous Party	Elected MP	Elected Party	Reference
1	Karan Singh	Congress	Karan Singh	Congress	
2	Janardan Dwivedi	Congress	Janardan Dwivedi	Congress	
3	Parvez Hashmi	Congress	Parvez Hashmi	Congress	

=== Sikkim ===
Seat No	Previous MP	Previous Party	Elected MP	Elected Party	Reference
1	O. T. Lepcha	SDF	Hishey Lachungpa	SDF	

== March Elections ==
=== Andhra Pradesh ===
Seat No	Previous MP	Previous Party	Elected MP	Elected Party	Reference
1	Raashid Alvi	Congress	Chiranjeevi	Congress	
2	K. Keshava Rao	Congress	Renuka Chowdary	Congress	
3	Dasari Narayana Rao	Congress	Rapolu Ananda Bhaskar	Congress	
4	G. Sanjeeva Reddy	Congress	P. Govardhan Reddy	Congress	
5	M. V. Mysura Reddy	TDP	T.Devender Goud	TDP	
6	Syed Azeez Pasha	CPI	C. M. Ramesh	TDP	

=== Bihar ===
Seat No	Previous MP	Previous Party	Elected MP	Elected Party	Reference
1	Ravi Shankar Prasad	BJP	Ravi Shankar Prasad	BJP	
2	Jabir Husain	RJD	Dharmendra Pradhan	BJP	
3	Mahendra Prasad	JD(U)	Mahendra Prasad	JD(U)	
4	Ali Anwar Ansari	JD(U)	Ali Anwar Ansari	JD(U)	
5	Anil Kumar Sahani	JD(U)	Anil Kumar Sahani	JD(U)	
6	Rajniti Prasad	RJD	Bashistha Narain Singh	JD(U)	

=== Chhattisgarh ===
Sr No	Previous MP	Previous Party	Elected MP	Elected Party	Reference
1	Shreegopal Vyas	BJP	Dr Bhushan Lal Jangde	BJP	

=== Gujarat ===
Seat No	Previous MP	Previous Party	Elected MP	Elected Party	Reference
1	Arun Jaitley	BJP	Arun Jaitley	BJP	
2	Vijay Rupani	BJP	Shankarbhai Vegad	BJP	
3	Kanjibhai Patel	BJP	Mansukh L. Mandaviya	BJP	
4	Praveen Rashtrapal	Congress	Praveen Rashtrapal	Congress	

=== Haryana ===
Seat No	Previous MP	Previous Party	Elected MP	Elected Party	Reference
1	Shadi Lal Batra	Congress	Shadi Lal Batra	Congress	

=== Himachal Pradesh ===
Sr No	Previous MP	Previous Party	Elected MP	Elected Party	Reference
1	Viplove Thakur	Congress	Jagat Prakash Nadda	BJP	

=== Jharkhand ===
Seat No	Previous MP	Previous Party	Elected MP	Elected Party	Reference
1	S. S. Ahluwalia	BJP	Sanjiv Kumar	JMM	
2	Mabel Rebello	Congress	Pradeep Kumar Balmuchu	Congress	

=== Karnataka ===
Seat No	Previous MP	Previous Party	Elected MP	Elected Party	Reference
1	Hema Malini	BJP	R Ramakrishna	BJP	
2	K. B. Shanappa	BJP	Basavaraj Patil Sedam	BJP	
3	K. Rahman Khan	Congress	K. Rahman Khan	Congress	
4	Rajeev Chandrasekhar	Independent	Rajeev Chandrasekhar	Independent	

=== Madhya Pradesh ===
Seat No	Previous MP	Previous Party	Elected MP	Elected Party	Reference
1	Kaptan Singh Solanki	BJP	Kaptan Singh Solanki	BJP	
2	Anusuiya Uikey	BJP	Najma Heptulla	BJP	
3	Meghraj Jain	BJP	Faggan Singh Kulaste	BJP	
4	Narayan Singh Kesari	BJP	Thawar Chand Gehlot	BJP	
5	Vikram Singh	BJP	Satyavrat Chaturvedi	Congress	

=== Maharashtra ===
Seat No	Previous MP	Previous Party	Elected MP	Elected Party	Reference
1	Balavant Apte	BJP	Ajay Sancheti	BJP	
2	Vilasrao Deshmukh	Congress	Vilasrao Deshmukh	Congress	
3	Rajeev Shukla	Congress	Rajeev Shukla	Congress	
4	Govindrao Adik	NCP	Vandana Chavan	NCP	
5	Ranjitsinh Mohite-Patil	NCP	D.P.Tripathi	NCP	
6	Manohar Joshi	SHS	Anil Desai	SHS	

=== Odisha ===
Seat No	Previous MP	Previous Party	Elected MP	Elected Party	Reference
1	Kishore Kumar Mohanti	BJD	Dilip Tirkey	BJD	
2	Rudra Narayan Pany	BJP	A V Swamy	BJD	
3	Sushila Tiriya	Congress	Ananga Udaya Singh Deo	BJD	

=== Rajasthan ===
Seat No	Previous MP	Previous Party	Elected MP	Elected Party	Reference
1	Abhishek Manu Singhvi	Congress	Abhishek Manu Singhvi	Congress	
2	Narendra Budania	Congress	Narendra Budania	Congress	
3	Ramdas Agarwal	BJP	Bhupender Yadav	BJP	

=== Uttar Pradesh ===
Seat No	Previous MP	Previous Party	Elected MP	Elected Party	Reference
1	Kalraj Mishra	BJP	Jaya Bachchan	SP	
2	Naresh Agrawal	SP	Naresh Agrawal	SP	
3	Veerpal Singh Yadav	SP	Darshan Singh Yadav	SP	
4	Mahendra Mohan	SP	Munvvar Saleem	SP	
5	Jai Prakash	BSP	Mayawati	BSP	
6	Ganga Charan Rajput	BSP	Munquad Ali	BSP	
7	Pramod Kureel	BSP	Brij Bhushan Tiwari	SP	
8	Munkad	BSP	Kiranmay Nanda	SP	
9	Vinay Katiyar	BJP	Vinay Katiyar	BJP	
10	Mahmood Madani	RLD	Rasheed Masood	Congress	Disq 19/09/2013

=== Uttarakhand ===
Seat No	Previous MP	Previous Party	Elected MP	Elected Party	Reference
1	Satyavrat Chaturvedi	INC	Mahendra Singh Mahra	INC	

=== West Bengal ===
Seat No	Previous MP	Previous Party	Elected MP	Elected Party	Reference
1	Tapan Kumar Sen	CPM	Tapan Kumar Sen	CPM	
2	Moinul Hassan	CPM	Md. Nadimul Haque	AITC	
3	Saman Pathak	CPM	Vivek Gupta	AITC	
4	R. C. Singh	CPM	Kunal Kumar Ghosh	AITC	
5	Mukul Roy	AITC	Mukul Roy	AITC	

== June Election ==
=== Kerala ===
Seat No	Previous MP	Previous Party	Elected MP	Elected Party	Reference
1	P. J. Kurien	Congress	P. J. Kurien	Congress	
2	K. E. Ismail	CPI	Joy Abraham	KC(M)	
3	P. R. Rajan	CPM	C.P. Narayanan	CPM	

== Bye-elections ==
The following bye-elections were held in the year 2012.

- The bye election was held, to fill the vacancy caused by death of Brij Bhushan Tiwari representing Uttar Pradesh. Alok Tiwari was elected unopposed on June 18, 2012, with the term till 2 April 2018.
- The bye election was held, to fill the vacancy caused by death of Vilasrao Deshmukh representing Maharashtra. Rajni Patil was elected unopposed on December 30, with the term till 2 April 2018.

Seat No	State	Previous MP	Previous Party	Elected MP	Elected Party	Reference
1	Uttar Pradesh	Brij Bhushan Tiwari	SP	Alok Tiwari	SP	
2	Maharashtra	Vilasrao Deshmukh	INC	Rajni Patil	INC	
