= 2018 Rajya Sabha elections =

Elections for the upper house of Indian Parliament

- 16 January, 23 March and 21 June 2018

72 seats to the Rajya Sabha (Note: Including 2 casual vacancies)
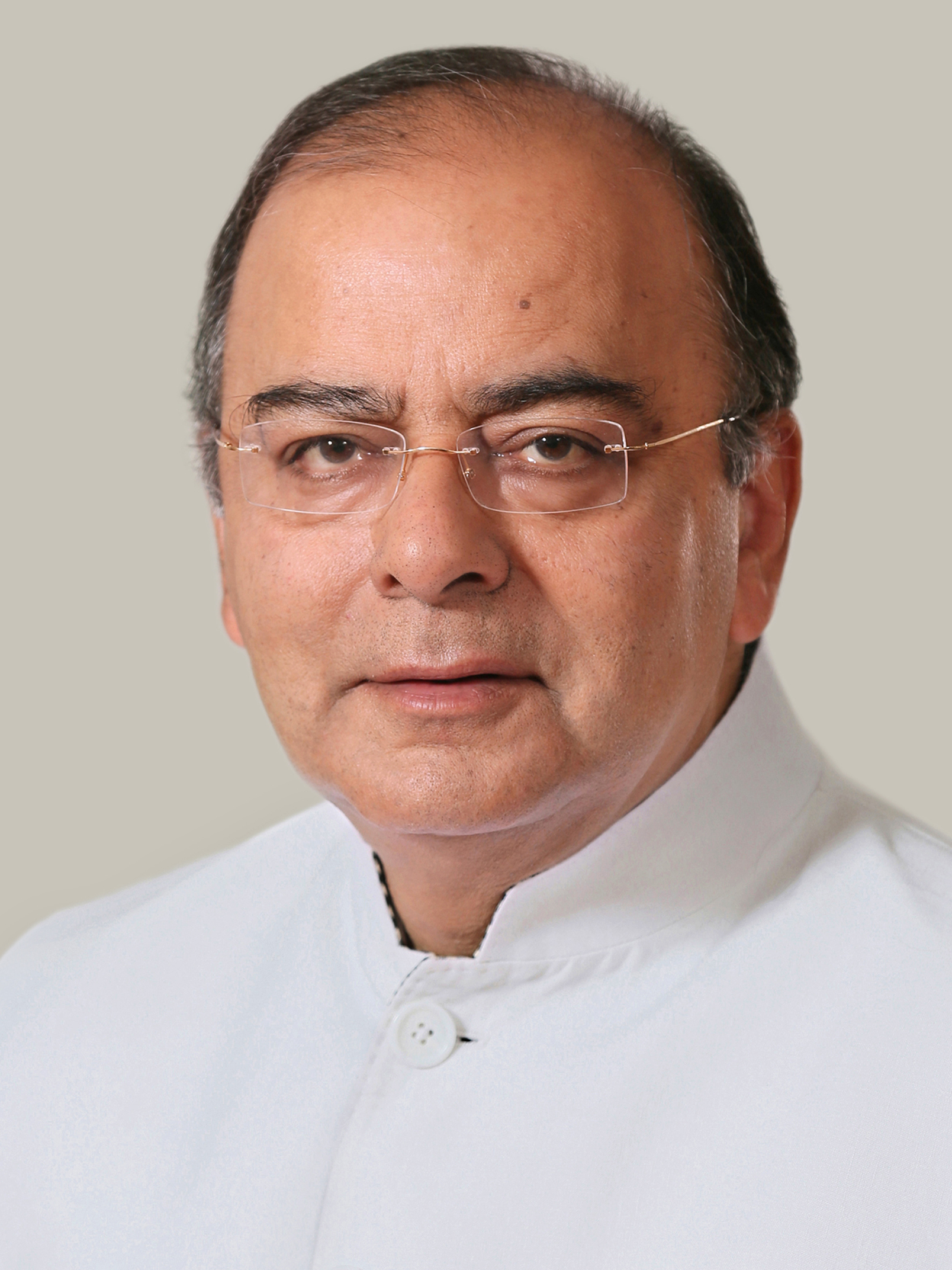

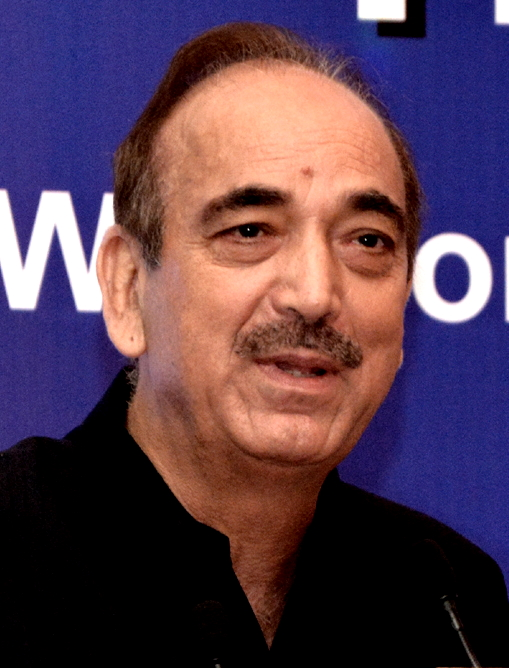

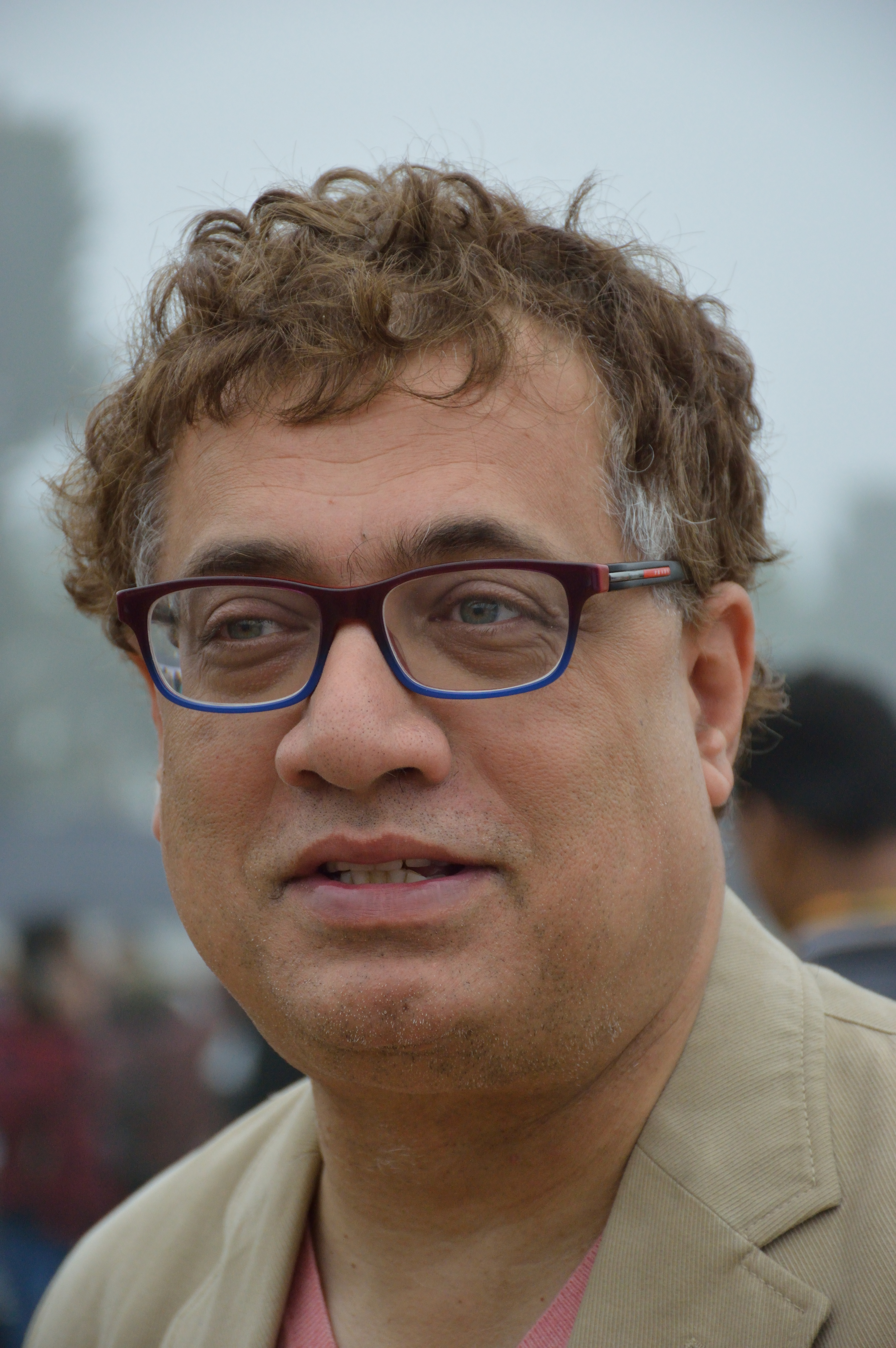
	First party	Second party
Leader	Arun Jaitley	Ghulam Nabi Azad
Party	BJP	INC
Alliance	NDA	UPA
Leader since	2 June 2014	8 June 2014
Leader's seat	Uttar Pradesh	Jammu and Kashmir
Seats before	58	58
Seats after	73	50
Seat change	▲15	▼8
	Third party	Fourth party
Leader	Derek O'Brien	Ram Gopal Yadav
Party	AITC	SP
Leader since	19 August 2011	26 November 2014
Leader's seat	West Bengal	Uttar Pradesh
Seats before	13	18
Seats after	13	13
Seat change	–	▼5

Rajya Sabha elections were held in 2018 to elect the 65 retiring members of the Rajya Sabha, Indian Parliament's upper chamber. There were, as routine, three such elections held among relevant State and Union Territory legislators by single transferable vote (STV) and Open Ballot: on 16 January to elect 3 members from Delhi and 1 member from Sikkim; on 23 March to elect 58 members from 16 States; and lastly on 21 June to elect 3 members from Kerala. Being even-numbered, 2018 was a year in which about 30% of the State Legislature-elected 233-seat component of the body is elected. The other 12 seats of the body are appointed by the President.

Not as part of a six-yearly cycle, a by-election was held to elect 1 member from Kerala in March, which proved to be a re-election but as an independent member, of M. P. Veerendra Kumar, the only by-election of the year. This was the first time a Non-Congress party became the Largest Party in the Upper House.

== Elections ==
The elections were held to elect 3 members from National Capital Territory of Delhi and 1 member from Sikkim. 3 members from the National Capital Territory of Delhi retired on 27 January 2018 and 1 member from Sikkim retired on 23 February 2018. Elections for 58 seats and a by-election for 1 seat were held on 23 March 2018. The election was held for 3 seats of Kerala on 21 June 2018.

State	Members retiring	Date of retirement
Delhi	3	27 January 2018
Sikkim	1	23 February 2018
Andhra Pradesh	3	2 April 2018
Bihar	6	2 April 2018
Chhattisgarh	1	2 April 2018
Gujarat	4	2 April 2018
Haryana	1	2 April 2018
Himachal Pradesh	1	2 April 2018
Karnataka	4	2 April 2018
Madhya Pradesh	5	2 April 2018
Maharashtra	6	2 April 2018
Telangana	3	2 April 2018
Uttar Pradesh	10	2 April 2018
Uttarakhand	1	2 April 2018
West Bengal	5	2 April 2018
Odisha	3	3 April 2018
Rajasthan	3	3 April 2018
Jharkhand	2	3 May 2018
Kerala	3	1 July 2018
Nominated	4	14 July 2018

== Members Elected ==
=== National Capital Territory of Delhi ===
Delhi had an election for 3 Rajya Sabha seats on 16 January 2018 to replace members retiring on 27 January 2018.

Seat No	Former MP	Former Party	Elected MP	Elected Party	Reference
1	Karan Singh	INC	Sanjay Singh	AAP	
2	Parvez Hashmi	INC	Sushil Gupta	AAP	
3	Janardan Dwivedi	INC	N. D. Gupta	AAP	

=== Sikkim ===
Sikkim had an election for 1 Rajya Sabha seat on 16 January 2018 to replace member retiring on 23 February 2018.

Seat No	Former MP	Former Party	Elected MP	Elected Party	Reference
1	Hishey Lachungpa	SDF	Hishey Lachungpa	SDF	

=== Andhra Pradesh ===
From Andhra Pradesh State, 3 members are elected unopposed for the Rajya Sabha seats on 15 March 2018, to replace members retiring on 2 April 2018.

Seat No	Former MP	Former Party	Elected MP	Elected Party	Reference
1	Tulla Devender Goud	TDP	C. M. Ramesh	TDP	
2	Renuka Chowdhury	INC	Kanakamedala Ravindra Kumar	TDP	
3	Chiranjeevi	INC	Vemireddy Prabhakar Reddy	YSRCP	

=== Bihar ===
From Bihar State, 6 members are elected unopposed for the Rajya Sabha seats on 15 March 2018, to replace members retiring on 2 April 2018.

Seat No	Former MP	Former Party	Elected MP	Elected Party	Reference
1	Ravi Shankar Prasad	BJP	Ravi Shankar Prasad	BJP	
2	Dharmendra Pradhan	BJP	Akhilesh Prasad Singh	INC	
3	Mahendra Prasad	JD(U)	Mahendra Prasad	JD(U)	
4	Bashistha Narain Singh	JD(U)	Bashistha Narain Singh	JD(U)	
5	Anil Kumar Sahani	JD(U)	Ashfaque Karim	RJD	
6	Vacant (Ali Anwar)	JD(U)	Manoj Jha	RJD	

=== Chhattisgarh ===
From Chhattisgarh State, 1 member is elected for the Rajya Sabha seat on 23 March 2018, to replace member retiring on 2 April 2018.

Seat No	Former MP	Former Party	Elected MP	Elected Party	Reference
1	Bhushan Lal Jangde	BJP	Saroj Pandey	BJP	

=== Gujarat ===
From Gujarat State, 4 members are elected unopposed for the Rajya Sabha seats on 15 March 2018, to replace members retiring on 2 April 2018.

Seat No	Former MP	Former Party	Elected MP	Elected Party	Reference
1	Parshottam Rupala	BJP	Parshottam Rupala	BJP	
2	Mansukh L. Mandaviya	BJP	Mansukh L. Mandaviya	BJP	
3	Arun Jaitley	BJP	Naranbhai Rathwa	INC	
4	Shankarbhai Vegad	BJP	Amee Yajnik	INC	

=== Haryana ===
From Haryana State, 1 member is elected unopposed for the Rajya Sabha seats on 15 March 2018, to replace member retiring on 2 April 2018.

Seat No	Former MP	Former Party	Elected MP	Elected Party	Reference
1	Shadi Lal Batra	INC	D.P. Vats	BJP	

=== Himachal Pradesh ===
From Himachal Pradesh State, 1 member is elected unopposed for the Rajya Sabha seats on 15 March 2018, to replace member retiring on 2 April 2018.

Seat No	Former MP	Former Party	Elected MP	Elected Party	Reference
1	Jagat Prakash Nadda	BJP	Jagat Prakash Nadda	BJP	

=== Jharkhand ===
From Jharkhand State, 2 members are elected for the Rajya Sabha seats on 23 March 2018, to replace members retiring on 3 May 2018.

Seat No	Former MP	Former Party	Elected MP	Elected Party	Reference
1	Sanjiv Kumar	JMM	Sameer Oraon	BJP	
2	Pradeep Kumar Balmuchu	INC	Dhiraj Prasad Sahu	INC	

=== Karnataka ===
From Karnataka State, 4 members are elected for the Rajya Sabha seats on 23 March 2018, to replace members retiring on 2 April 2018.

Seat No	Former MP	Former Party	Elected MP	Elected Party	Reference
1	R Ramakrishna	BJP	Syed Naseer Hussain	INC	
2	Basavaraj Patil Sedam	BJP	L. Hanumanthaiah	INC	
3	K. Rahman Khan	INC	G C Chandrasekhar	INC	
4	Vacant (Rajeev Chandrasekhar)	Independent	Rajeev Chandrasekhar	BJP	

=== Madhya Pradesh ===
From Madhya Pradesh State, 5 members are elected unopposed for the Rajya Sabha seats on 15 March 2018, to replace members retiring on 2 April 2018.

Seat No	Former MP	Former Party	Elected MP	Elected Party	Reference
1	Satyavrat Chaturvedi	INC	Rajmani Patel	INC	
2	Meghraj Jain	BJP	Dharmendra Pradhan	BJP	
3	Prakash Javadekar	BJP	Kailash Soni	BJP	
4	La Ganesan	BJP	Ajay Pratap Singh	BJP	
5	Thawar Chand Gehlot	BJP	Thawar Chand Gehlot	BJP	

=== Maharashtra ===
From Maharashtra State, 6 members are elected unopposed for the Rajya Sabha seats on 15 March 2018, to replace members retiring on 2 April 2018.

Seat No	Former MP	Former Party	Elected MP	Elected Party	Reference
1	Ajay Sancheti	BJP	Prakash Javadekar	BJP	
2	D. P. Tripathi	NCP	Narayan Rane	BJP	
3	Rajeev Shukla	INC	V. Muraleedharan	BJP	
4	Rajni Patil	INC	Kumar Ketkar	INC	
5	Vandana Chavan	NCP	Vandana Chavan	NCP	
6	Anil Desai	SS	Anil Desai	SS	

=== Odisha ===
From Odisha State, 3 members are elected unopposed for the Rajya Sabha seats on 15 March 2018, to replace members retiring on 3 April 2018.

Seat No	Former MP	Former Party	Elected MP	Elected Party	Reference
1	Ananga Udaya Singh Deo	BJD	Prashanta Nanda	BJD	
2	Dilip Tirkey	BJD	Achyuta Samanta	BJD	
3	A V Swamy	Independent	Soumya Ranjan Patnaik	BJD	

=== Rajasthan ===
From Rajasthan State, 3 members are elected unopposed for the Rajya Sabha seats on 15 March 2018, to replace members retiring on 3 April 2018.

Seat No	Former MP	Former Party	Elected MP	Elected Party	Reference
1	Abhishek Singhvi	INC	Kirodi Lal Meena	BJP	
2	Narendra Budania	INC	Madan Lal Saini	BJP	
3	Bhupender Yadav	BJP	Bhupender Yadav	BJP	

=== Telangana ===
From Telangana State, 3 members are elected for the Rajya Sabha seats on 23 March 2018, to replace members retiring on 2 April 2018.

Seat No	Former MP	Former Party	Elected MP	Elected Party	Reference
1	C. M. Ramesh	TDP	Joginapally Santosh Kumar	TRS	
2	Rapolu Ananda Bhaskar	INC	Badulgula Lingaiah Yadav	TRS	
3	Vacant (P. Govardhan Reddy)	INC	Banda Prakash	TRS	

=== Uttarakhand ===
From Uttarakhand State, 1 member is elected unopposed for the Rajya Sabha seats on 15 March 2018, to replace member retiring on 2 April 2018.

Seat No	Former MP	Former Party	Elected MP	Elected Party	Reference
1	Mahendra Singh Mahra	INC	Anil Baluni	BJP	

=== Uttar Pradesh ===
From Uttar Pradesh State, 10 members are elected for the Rajya Sabha seats on 23 March 2018, to replace members retiring on 2 April 2018.

Seat No	Previous MP	Previous Party	Elected MP	Elected Party	Reference
1	Jaya Bachchan	SP	Jaya Bachchan	SP	
2	Naresh Chandra Agrawal	SP	Arun Jaitley	BJP	
3	Alok Tiwari	SP	Anil Jain	BJP	
4	Munvvar Saleem	SP	Ashok Bajpai	BJP	
5	Darshan Singh Yadav	SP	Harnath Singh Yadav	BJP	
6	Kiranmay Nanda	SP	Anil Agrawal	BJP	
7	Munquad Ali	BSP	Sakal Deep Rajbhar	BJP	
8	Vacant (Mayawati)	BSP	Kanta Kardam	BJP	
9	Pramod Tiwari	INC	G. V. L. Narasimha Rao	BJP	
10	Vinay Katiyar	BJP	Vijaypal Singh Tomar	BJP	

=== West Bengal ===
From West Bengal State, 5 members are elected for the Rajya Sabha seats on 23 March 2018, to replace members retiring on 2 April 2018.

Seat No	Previous MP	Previous Party	Elected MP	Elected Party	Reference
1	Tapan Kumar Sen	CPI(M)	Abhishek Singhvi	INC	
2	Nadimul Haque	AITC	Nadimul Haque	AITC	
3	Vivek Gupta	AITC	Abir Biswas	AITC	
4	Kunal Kumar Ghosh	AITC	Santunu Sen	AITC	
5	Vacant (Mukul Roy)	AITC	Subhasish Chakraborty	AITC	

=== Kerala ===
From Kerala State, 3 members are elected unopposed for the Rajya Sabha seats on 14 June 2018, to replace members retiring on 1 July 2018.

Seat No	Former MP	Former Party	Elected MP	Elected Party	Reference
1	C.P. Narayanan	CPI(M)	Elamaram Kareem	CPI(M)	
2	P. J. Kurien	INC	Binoy Viswam	CPI	
3	Joy Abraham	KC(M)	Jose K. Mani	KC(M)	

=== Nominated ===
Seat No	Former MP	Former Party	Elected MP	Elected Party	Reference
1	Anu Aga	Nominated	Raghunath Mohapatra	BJP	
2	K. Parasaran	Nominated	Sonal Mansingh	BJP	
3	Rekha	Nominated	Ram Shakal	BJP	
4	Sachin Tendulkar	Nominated	Rakesh Sinha	BJP	

== By-elections ==
In addition to scheduled elections, unforeseen vacancies, caused by members' resignation, death or disqualification, may also be filled via By-elections.

- On 2 September 2017, Manohar Parrikar resigned from membership of the Rajya Sabha from Uttar Pradesh, due to his election as the member of Goa Legislative Assembly on 23 August by-poll.

=== Uttar Pradesh ===
S.No	Former MP	Party	Date of Vacancy	Elected MP	Party	Date of appointment	Date of retirement
1	Manohar Parrikar	BJP	2 September 2017	Hardeep Singh Puri	BJP	9 January 2018	25 November 2020

=== Kerala ===
- On 20 December 2017, M. P. Veerendra Kumar resigned from Rajya Sabha due to disqualification of Sharad Yadav.

S.No	Former MP	Party	Date of Vacancy	Elected MP	Party	Date of appointment	Date of retirement
1	M. P. Veerendra Kumar	Janata Dal (United)	20 December 2017	M. P. Veerendra Kumar	IND	24 March 2018	2 April 2022
