= 2006 Rajya Sabha elections =

Elections for the upper house of Indian Parliament

(of 228 seats) to the Rajya Sabha
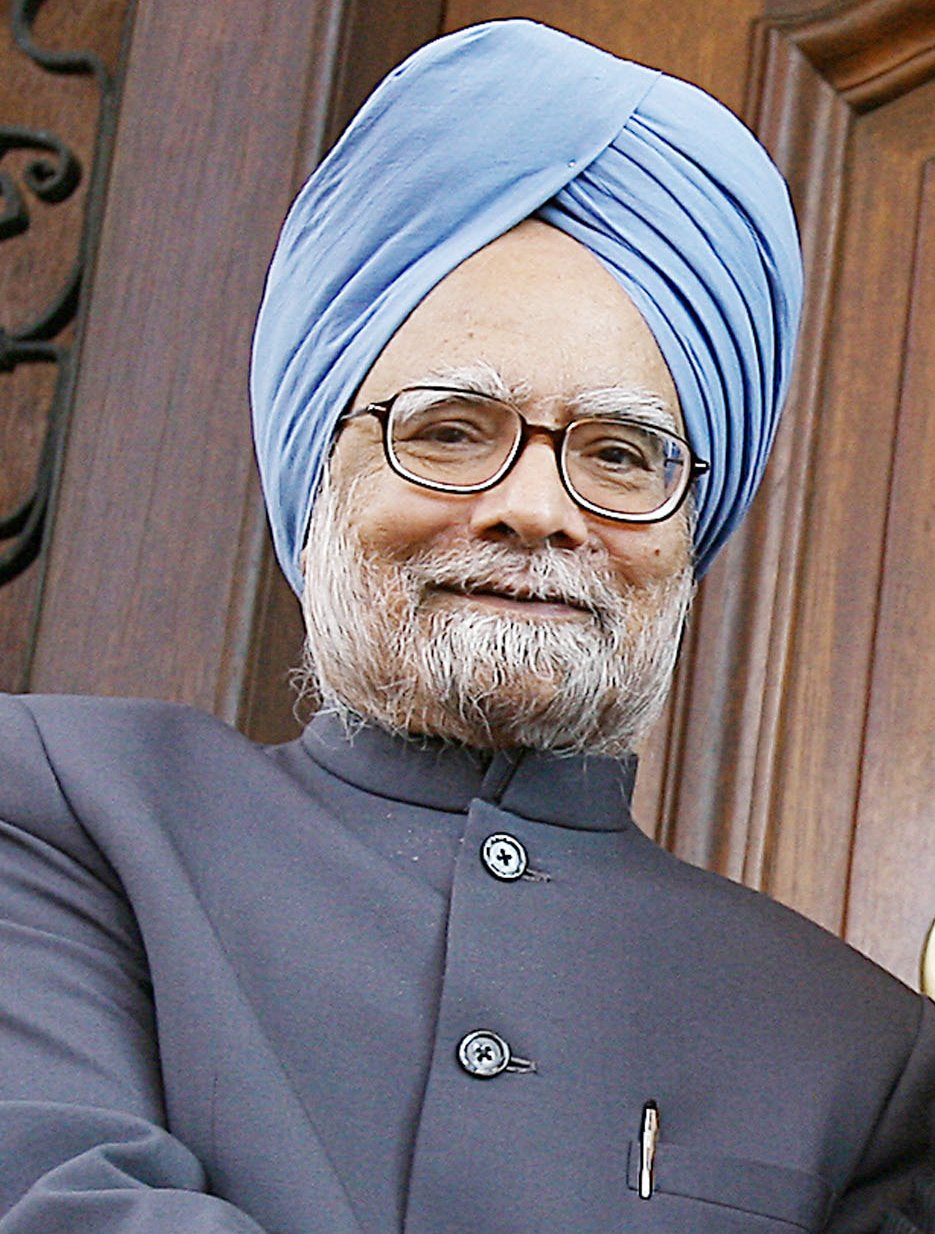

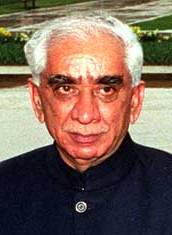
| | First party | Second party |
|---|---|---|
| Leader | Manmohan Singh | Jaswant Singh |
| Party | INC | BJP |

Rajya Sabha elections were held on various dates in 2006, to elect members of the Rajya Sabha, Indian Parliament's upper chamber. The elections were held to elect respectively one member from Sikkim, 58 members from 15 states, two members from Jharkhand, and three members from Kerala, for the Council of States, the Rajya Sabha.

== Elections ==
Elections were held to elect members from various states.

=== Members elected ===
The following members are elected in the elections held in 2006. The list is incomplete.

State - Member - Party

Rajya Sabha members for term 2006-2012
| State | Member Name | Party | Remark |
|---|---|---|---|
| SK | O. T. Lepcha | SDF | |
| DL | Dr Karan Singh | INC | R |
| DL | Janardan Dwivedi | INC | |
| DL | Parvez Hashmi | INC | |
| AP | Syed Azeez Pasha | CPI | |
| AP | K. Keshava Rao | INC | |
| AP | Dasari Narayana Rao | INC | |
| AP | Raashid Alvi | INC | |
| AP | G. Sanjeeva Reddy | INC | |
| AP | M. V. Mysura Reddy | TDP | |
| BH | Ravi Shankar Prasad | BJP | R |
| BH | Mahendra Prasad | JDU | |
| BH | Ali Anwar | JDU | |
| BH | Anil Kumar Sahani | JDU | |
| BH | Rajniti Prasad | RJD | |
| BH | Jabir Husain | RJD | |
| CG | Shreegopal Vyas | BJP | R |
| GJ | Arun Jaitley | BJP | R |
| GJ | Vijay Rupani | BJP | |
| GJ | Kanjibhai Patel | BJP | |
| GJ | Praveen Rashtrapal | INC | |
| HR | Shadi Lal Batra | INC | |
| HP | Viplove Thakur | INC | |
| JH | S. S. Ahluwalia | BJP | |
| JH | Mabel Rebello | INC | |
| KA | Hema Malini | BJP | |
| KA | K. B. Shanappa | BJP | |
| KA | K. Rahman Khan | INC | |
| KA | Rajeev Chandrasekhar | IND | |
| MP | Kaptan_Singh_Solanki | BJP | |
| MP | Anusuiya Uikey | BJP | |
| MP | Meghraj Jain | BJP | |
| MP | Narayan Singh Kesari | BJP | |
| MP | Vikram Verma | BJP | |
| MP | Hans Raj Bhardwaj | INC | res 29/06/2009 Govr KA |
| MH | Balavant Apte | BJP | |
| MH | Manohar Joshi | SS | |
| MH | Vilasrao Deshmukh | INC | |
| MH | Rajeev Shukla | INC | |
| MH | Govindrao Adik | NCP | |
| MH | Ranjitsinh Mohite-Patil | NCP | R |
| OR | Rudra Narayan Pany | BJP | |
| OR | Kishore Kumar Mohanti | BJD | |
| OR | Sushila Tiriya | INC | |
| RJ | Ramdas Agarwal | BJP | |
| RJ | Narendra Budania | INC | |
| RJ | Abhishek Manu Singhvi | INC | |
| UP | Kalraj Mishra | BJP | |
| UP | Vinay Katiyar | BJP | |
| UP | Naresh Agrawal | SP | |
| UP | Veerpal Singh Yadav | SP | |
| UP | Mahendra Mohan | SP | |
| UP | Jai Prakash | BSP | |
| UP | Banwari Lal Kanchhal | SP | res 23/04/2009 |
| UP | Ganga Charan Rajput | SP | ele 19/06/2009 |
| UP | Pramod Kureel | BSP | |
| UP | Munkad | BSP | |
| UP | Mahmood Madani | RLD | |
| UK | Satyavrat Chaturvedi | INC | |
| WB | Tapan Kumar Sen | CPM | |
| WB | Moinul Hassan | CPM | |
| WB | Saman Pathak | CPM | |
| WB | R. C. Singh | AIFB | |
| WB | Mukul Roy | TMC | |
| JH | S. S. Ahluwalia | BJP | |
| JH | Mabel Rebello | INC | |
| KL | P. J. Kurien | INC | |
| KL | K. E. Ismail | CPI | |
| KL | P. R. Rajan | CPM | |

== Bye-elections ==
The following bye elections were held in the year 2006.

State - Member - Party

- Bye-elections were held on 28/03/2006 for vacancy from Orissa due to the expulsion of seating member Dr Chhattrapal Singh Lodha on 23 December 2005 with term ending on 1 July 2010
- Bye-elections were held on 15/06/2006 for vacancy from Uttar Pradesh due to disqualification of seating member Jaya Bachchan on 16.03.2006 with term ending on -- and due to resignation of seating member Anil Ambani on 29.03.2006 with term ending on --
- Bye-elections were held on 15/06/2006 for vacancy from Maharashtra and Jammu and Kashmir due to death of seating member Pramod Mahajan on 03.05.2006 with term ending on -- and due to resignation of seating member Ghulam Nabi Azad on 29.04.2006 with term ending on --
- Bye-elections were held on 13/07/2006 for vacancy from Tamil Nadu due to resignation of seating member R. Sarath Kumar on 31 May 2006, with term ending on 24 July 2007
- Bye-elections were held on 18/09/2006 for vacancy from Maharashtra due to death of seating member Vasant Chavan on 11 July 2006, with term ending on 2 April 2012
- Bye-elections were held on 11/12/2006 for vacancy from Uttar Pradesh due to death of seating member Lalit Suri on 10 October 2006, with term ending on 4 July 2010
