= 2000 Rajya Sabha elections =

Elections for the upper house of Indian Parliament

(of 228 seats) to the Rajya Sabha
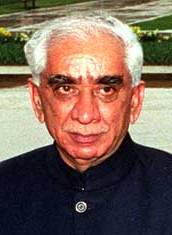

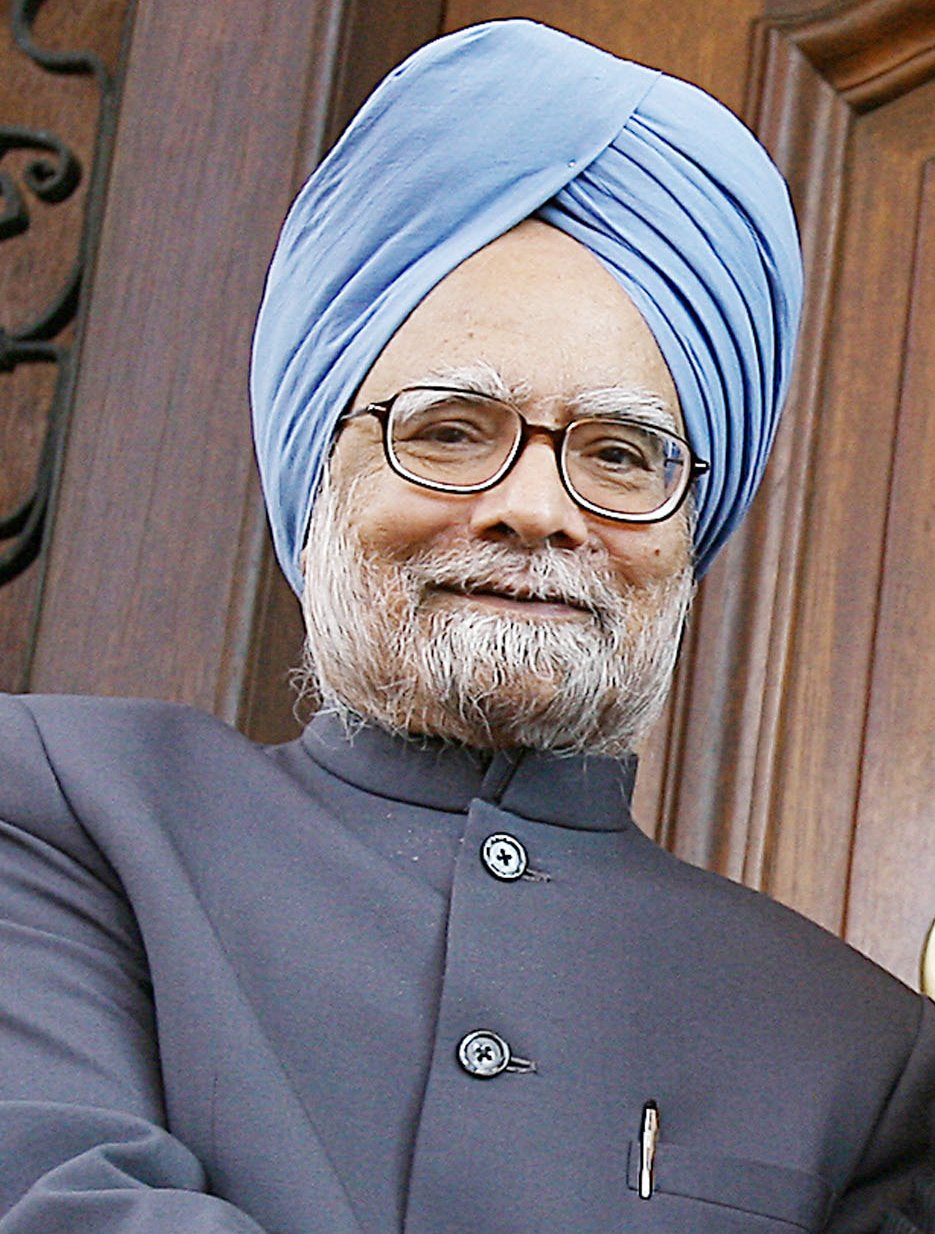
	First party	Second party
Leader	Jaswant Singh	Manmohan Singh
Party	BJP	INC

Rajya Sabha elections were held in 2000, to elect members of the Rajya Sabha, Indian Parliament's upper chamber. The elections were held to elect respectively 3 seats from Delhi and 1 seat from Sikkim, 58 members from 15 states and 3 members from Kerala for the Council of States, the Rajya Sabha.

== Elections ==
Elections were held in 2000 to elect members from various states. The list is incomplete.

=== Members elected ===
The following members are elected in the elections held in 2000. They are members for the term 2000-2006 and retire in year 2006, except in case of the resignation or death before the term.

State - Member - Party

Rajya Sabha members for term 2000-2006
State	Member Name	Party	Remark
Delhi	Karan Singh	INC	
Delhi	Janardan Dwivedi	INC	
Delhi	P. M. Sayeed	INC	
Sikkim	P.T. Gyamtso	SDF	
AP	Alladi P Rajkumar	INC	R
AP	Venga Geetha	TDP	
AP	Dasari Narayana Rao	INC	
AP	Raashid Alvi	INC	
AP	K. Rama Mohana Rao	TDP	
AP	Ramamuni Reddy Sirigi Reddy	TDP	
BH	Kumkum Rai	JDU	
BH	Mahendra Prasad	JDU	
BH	Ravi Shankar Prasad	BJP	
BH	Faguni Ram	INC	
BH	Vidya Sagar Nishad	RJD	
BH	Vijay Singh Yadav	RJD	
CG	Kamla Manhar	INC	
GJ	Arun Jaitley	BJP	
GJ	Dr A K Patel	INC	
GJ	Rajubhai A Parmar	INC	
GJ	Lekhraj H Bachani	INC	
HR	Ramji Lal	INLD	
HP	Sunil Barongpa	INC	
JH	S. S. Ahluwalia	BJP	
JH	RK Anand	INC	
KA	Bimba Raikar	INC	
KA	K. Rahman Khan	INC	
KA	M. Rajasekara Murthy	INC	Res 10-11-2005
KA	K.B. Krishna Murthy	INC	
MP	H. R. Bhardwaj	INC	
MP	Arjun Singh	INC	
MP	P K Maheshwari	INC	
MP	Narayan Singh Kesari	BJP	
MP	Vikram Verma	BJP	
MH	Balavant Apte	BJP	
MH	R. S. Gavai	RPI	
MH	Yusuf Sanwar Khan	INC	
MH	Rajeev Shukla	INC	
MH	Praful Patel	NCP	
MH	Vasant Chavan	NCP	
MH	Ram Jethmalani	OTH	
UP	Kalraj Mishra	BJP	
UP	Ram Nath Kovind	BJP	
UP	Balbir Punj	BJP	
UP	R. B. S. Varma	BJP	
UP	Ghanshyam Chandra Kharwar	BSP	
UP	Sakshi Maharaj	BJP	
UP	Janeshwar Mishra	SP	
UP	Dara Singh Chauhan	BSP	
UP	Rajeev Shukla	INC	
UP	Prof M. M. Agarwal	IND	
UP	Sushma Swaraj	BJP	fr UP till 08/11/2000
WB	Nilotpal Basu	CPM	
WB	Dipankar Mukherjee	CPM	
WB	Manoj Bhattacharya	RSP	
WB	Jayanta Bhattacharya	INC	
WB	Biplab Dasgupta	CPM	Dea 17-07-2005
OR	Rudra Narayan Pany	BJP	
OR	Birabhadra Singh	--	
OR	Baijayant Panda	BJD	
RJ	Ramdas Agarwal	BJP	
RJ	Jamna Devi	INC	
RJ	Mool Chand	INC	
Kerala	P.J. Kurien	INC	
Kerala	N.K. Premachandran	RSP	
Kerala	M. P. Abdussamad Samadani	ML	

== Bye-elections ==
The following bye elections were held in the year 2000.

State - Member - Party

- Bye-elections were held on 20/01/2000 for vacancy from Karnataka and Jammu Kashmir due to resignations of seating members S M Krishna on 14.10.1999 with term ending on 09.04.2002 and Dr Karan Singh on 12.08.1999 with term ending on 29 November 2002. From Karnataka K. C. Kondaiah of INC became member.
- Bye-elections were held on 20/01/2000 for vacancy from Tamil Nadu due to resignations of seating members R.K. Kumar on 03.10.1999 with term ending on 02.04.2002 and T.M. Venkatachalam on 02.12.1999 with term ending on 02.04.2002.
- Bye-elections were held on 29/03/2000 for vacancy from Jammu Kashmir and Bihar due to resignation of seating member Dr Karan Singh on 12.08.1999 with term ending on 29 November 2002 and death of seating member Jagdambi Mandal on 13 January 2000 with term ending on 09.04.2002.
- Bye-elections were held on 21/09/2000 for vacancy from Sikkim due to death of seating member K G Bhutia on 12.8.2000 with term ending on 23 February 2006.
