= List of Rajya Sabha members from the Aam Aadmi Party =

Aam Aadmi Party upper house members

Aam Aadmi Party is a political party in India, It is currently the ruling party of the state of Punjab. The Rajya Sabha members are elected for a six year term.

#	Name	Constituency	Term start	Term end	Term	Notes
1	N. D. Gupta	Delhi	28 January 2018	27 January 2024	1	
2	Sushil Gupta	Delhi	28 January 2018	27 January 2024	1	
3	Sanjay Singh	Delhi	28 January 2018	27 January 2024	1	
4	Ashok Kumar Mittal	Punjab	10 April 2022	24 April 2026	1	Resigned from the Aam Aadmi Party on 24 April 2026 and joined the Bharatiya Janata Party.
5	Harbhajan Singh	Punjab	10 April 2022	24 April 2026	1	Resigned from the Aam Aadmi Party on 24 April 2026 and joined the Bharatiya Janata Party.
6	Raghav Chadha	Punjab	10 April 2022	24 April 2026	1	Resigned from the Aam Aadmi Party on 24 April 2026 and joined the Bharatiya Janata Party.
7	Sandeep Pathak	Punjab	10 April 2022	24 April 2026	1	Resigned from the Aam Aadmi Party on 24 April 2026 and joined the Bharatiya Janata Party.
8	Sanjeev Arora	Punjab	10 April 2022	1 July 2025	1	Resigned from the Rajya Sabha after being elected to the Punjab Legislative Assembly in a by-election.
9	Balbir Singh Seechewal	Punjab	4 July 2022	9 April 2028	1	
10	Vikramjit Singh Sahney	Punjab	4 July 2022	9 April 2028	1	Resigned from the Aam Aadmi Party on 24 April 2026 and joined the Bharatiya Janata Party.
(1)	N. D. Gupta	Delhi	28 January 2024	27 January 2030	2	
(3)	Sanjay Singh	Delhi	28 January 2024	27 January 2030	2	
11	Swati Maliwal	Delhi	28 January 2024	24 April 2026	1	Resigned from the Aam Aadmi Party on 24 April 2026 and joined the Bharatiya Janata Party.
12	Rajinder Gupta	Punjab	24 October 2025	24 April 2026	1	Elected in a by-election following the resignation of Sanjeev Arora. Resigned from the Aam Aadmi Party on 24 April 2026 and joined the Bharatiya Janata Party.
