= Vasisht =

Vasisht may refer to:

- Akash Vasisht, Indian cricket player
- Shanta Vasisht, Indian politician
- Vashistha, Indian Vedic sage
