= Delhi Commission for Women =

Statutory body for women's rights, India

- Abbreviation: DCW
- Formation: 1996 (30 years ago)
- Founder: Government of Delhi
- Founded at: New Delhi
- Type: Governmental Organization
- Legal status: Protection for women's
- Headquarters: Delhi, New Delhi, India
- Location: Delhi, India
- Region served: Delhi
- Chairperson: Lata Gupta (BJP)
- Parent organization: Government of Delhi
- Website: dcw.delhi.gov.in

The Delhi Commission for Women (DCW) is a statutory body of the Government of Delhi constituted to investigate and examine all matters relating to the safety and security of women under the constitution and other laws in Delhi, India.

Swati Maliwal was the chairperson of DCW, who took charge on 29 July 2015 until 19 January 2024.

== History ==
DCW was constituted in 1994 by the Government of Delhi under the Delhi Commission for Women Act, 1994, and it started functioning in 1996. The primary agenda of the Commission is the investigation and examination of all matters relating to the safety and security provided to women under the Constitution and other laws. The Commission is also committed to making recommendations for effective implementation of laws and to improve the conditions of women in Delhi.

== Composition ==
According to the DCW Act, the commission consists of:

1. A Chairperson, committed to the cause of women, to be nominated by the Government.
2. Five members to be nominated by the Government from and amongst the persons having not less than 10 years experience in the field of women welfare, administration economic development, health education or social welfare, including at least one Member belonging to the Scheduled Castes or Scheduled Tribes.
3. A Member-Secretary to be nominated by the Government who shall be: an expert in the field of management, organisational structure or sociological movement, or an officer who is a member of a civil services of the Union or of an All India Service holds a civil post under the Union with appropriate experience.

Although members need to have at least 10 years experience in women welfare, the Chairperson is not required to have any such qualification.

== Functions ==
The commission has various functions such as to "investigate and examine all matters relating to the safeguards provided for women under the constitution and other laws". In certain matters the commission also acts as a quasi-judicial body. The commission has all the powers of a civil court trying suit in certain cases such as "summoning and enforcing the attendance of any person from any part of India and examine him on oath" and "requiring the discovery and production of any document".

- Commission should ensure that it adheres to the provision and protection guaranteed for women under Constitution of India and women related legislations.
- In case any agency in the state fails to implement protective measures against women, getting the same to the notice of Government.
- Making recommendations for the amendments in any law if it fails on provision of justice to the women of the state.
- Taking up with concerned authorities any issue of violation of women's rights and recommending follow-up action to them.
- Women who have complaints of violation of their rights and non-implementation of their protective measures guaranteed under the Constitution of India can directly approach Women Commission for redressal.
- Counselling and assisting women who are victims of atrocities and discrimination in the state.
- Financing litigation expenses for any issues involving mass group of women and occasionally make reports to the state government relating to them.
- Inspecting any premises, jail or other remand home where women prisoners are lodged or any other case and bringing them to the notice of respective authorities, in case of need.
- Enquire, study and investigate any specific women-based issues.
- Initiate educational research or undertaking any promotional method and recommend ways for ensuring women representation in all areas and identifying reasons depriving them of their rights.
- To enquire suo-moto or any complaints of any issue which deprives women of their rights or women protection laws not being implemented or noncompliance of any policies relating to them or failure of following instructions relating to women welfare and relief associated with them.

== See also ==
National Commission for Women
