= Member of Parliament (India) =

Member of Indian Parliament

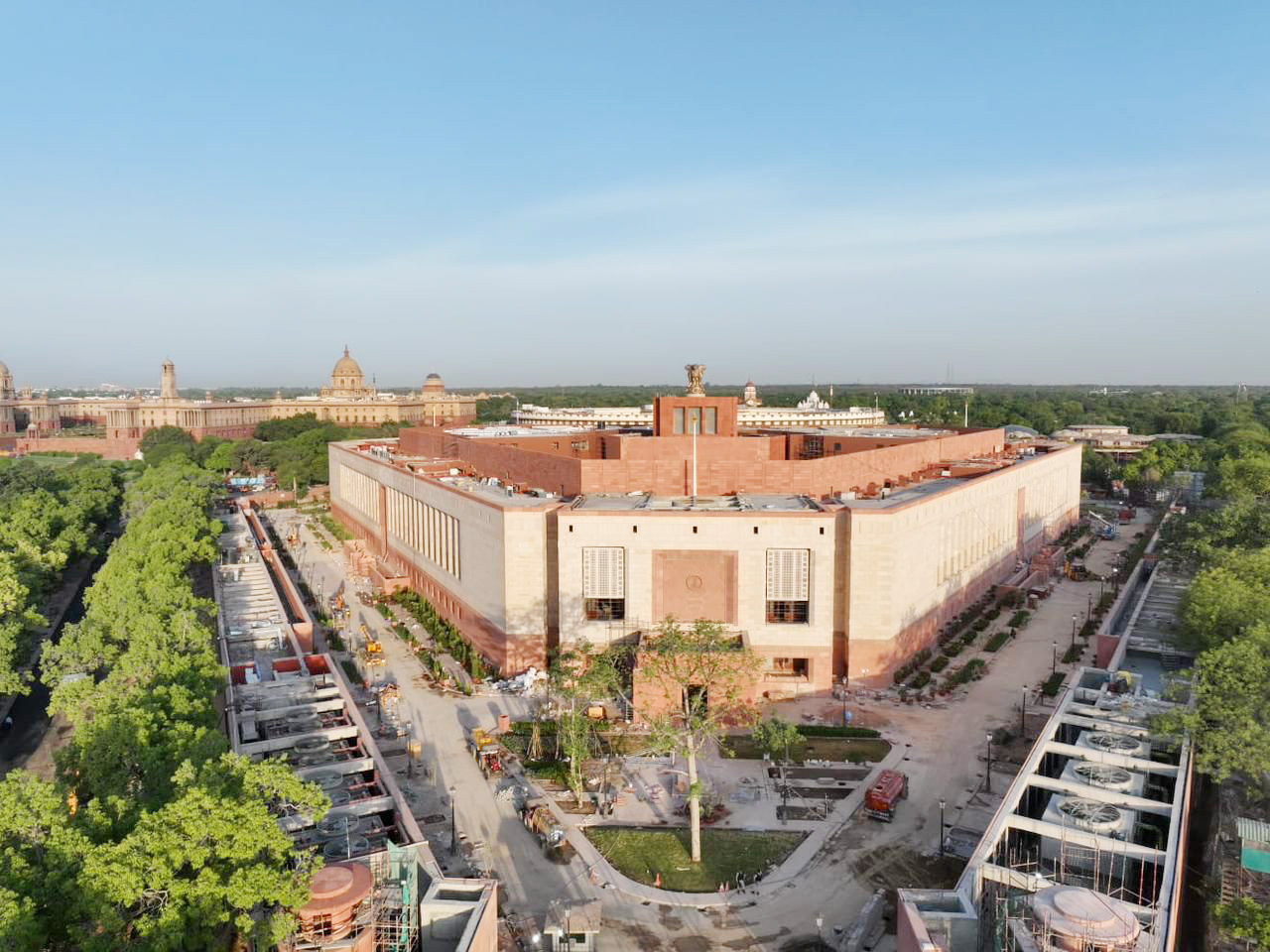
Parliament House in New Delhi

A member of Parliament (MP) in India refers to persons who serve in the Parliament of India. These include:

- Member of Parliament, Rajya Sabha: representative of the Indian states to the Rajya Sabha, the upper house of the Parliament of India.
- Member of Parliament, Lok Sabha: representative of the Indian citizens to the Lok Sabha, the lower house of the Parliament of India.

== Lok Sabha ==
- Lists of members of the Lok Sabha by year: Members of the 1st Lok Sabha to the 18th Lok Sabha

== Rajya Sabha ==
1. List of current members of the Rajya Sabha
2. List of nominated members of Rajya Sabha
3. List of Rajya Sabha members from Andhra Pradesh
4. List of Rajya Sabha members from Arunachal Pradesh
5. List of Rajya Sabha members from Assam
6. List of Rajya Sabha members from Bihar
7. List of Rajya Sabha members from Chhattisgarh
8. List of Rajya Sabha members from Goa
9. List of Rajya Sabha members from Gujarat
10. List of Rajya Sabha members from Haryana
11. List of Rajya Sabha members from Himachal Pradesh
12. List of Rajya Sabha members from Jharkhand
13. List of Rajya Sabha members from Karnataka
14. List of Rajya Sabha members from Kerala
15. List of Rajya Sabha members from Madhya Pradesh
16. List of Rajya Sabha members from Maharashtra
17. List of Rajya Sabha members from Manipur
18. List of Rajya Sabha members from Meghalaya
19. List of Rajya Sabha members from Mizoram
20. List of Rajya Sabha members from Nagaland
21. List of Rajya Sabha members from Odisha
22. List of Rajya Sabha members from Punjab
23. List of Rajya Sabha members from Rajasthan
24. List of Rajya Sabha members from Sikkim
25. List of Rajya Sabha members from Tamil Nadu
26. List of Rajya Sabha members from Telangana
27. List of Rajya Sabha members from Tripura
28. List of Rajya Sabha members from Uttar Pradesh
29. List of Rajya Sabha members from Uttarakhand
30. List of Rajya Sabha members from West Bengal
31. List of Rajya Sabha members from Delhi
32. List of Rajya Sabha members from Jammu and Kashmir
33. List of Rajya Sabha members from Puducherry
