= Parsadih =

Indian village

Parsadih is a small Village/hamlet in Baloda Bazar Tehsil and District of Chhattisgarh State in India.

Dr Bhushan Lal Jangde, the Rajya Sabha member and Member of Parliament from Chhattisgarh is from this village.
