= Sushil Gupta =

Indian politician

Member of Parliament, Rajya Sabha
- In office 28 January 2018 – 27 January 2024
- Preceded by: Parvez Hashmi
- Succeeded by: Swati Maliwal
- Constituency: National Capital Territory of Delhi

Incharge, Aam Aadmi Party Haryana
- Incumbent
- Assumed office 17 June 2020

Personal details
- Born: 1 May 1961 (age 64) Jind, Punjab (present–day Haryana), India
- Party: Aam Aadmi Party
- Occupation: Educationist, politician

Sushil Kumar Gupta is an Indian politician, businessman and owner of various schools in and around Delhi. He was a Member of Parliament in the Rajya Sabha of the Indian Parliament from the Aam Aadmi Party.

He was named in the Pandora Papers which exposed various secret offshore accounts.

Rajya Sabha
Preceded by ?	Member of Parliament in Rajya Sabha for Delhi; 28 January 2018 – 27 January 2024	Succeeded by Swati Maliwal
Aam Aadmi Party political offices
New political party	Ex-Officio Member of AAP ? – present	Incumbent
