= Syed Naseer Hussain =

Indian politician

Member of Parliament, Rajya Sabha
- Incumbent
- Assumed office 03 April 2018
- Preceded by: R. Ramakrishna
- Constituency: Karnataka

AICC General Secretary Incharge - Jammu & Kashmir and Ladakh
- Incumbent
- Assumed office 14 February 2025
- Preceded by: Bharatsinh Madhavsinh Solanki

Personal details
- Born: 10 June 1970 (age 56) Channagiri, Davanagere District, Karnataka, India
- Party: Indian National Congress
- Spouse: Mehnaz Ansari
- Children: 2 sons
- Parent: Syed Hafeez Akhtar Unnisa
- Education: St. Philomena's College, Mysore (BA) University of Mysore (MA) Jawaharlal Nehru University (MPhil, PhD)
- Profession: Politician
- Website: https://drsyednaseerhussain.in/

Syed Naseer Hussain (born June 10, 1970) is a senior Indian politician who hails from Ballari, Karnataka. A member of the Indian National Congress (INC), he currently serves as a Member of Parliament representing the state of Karnataka in the Rajya Sabha. He is a Member of the Congress Working Committee (CWC), General Secretary, In-charge for Jammu & Kashmir and Ladakh and National Spokesperson. He also serves as Whip CPP in Rajya Sabha.

He was in-charge of the office of the President, Indian National Congress Shri. Mallikarjun Kharge from 23 December 2023 to 14 February 2025, and prior to that, he was the campaign manager for Shri. Mallikarjun Kharge for the office of the President, Indian National Congress.

Hussain has been a political activist and student leader from his school days. He has won several students' union elections and went on to serve as the President of the Jawaharlal Nehru University Students' Union (JNUSU) in 1999–2000.

He is currently a lead voice in the Parliament on issues related to constitutional rights. He was suspended thrice for protesting on bills and passage of laws affecting farmers' rights, labour codes and breach of security in the Parliament.

== Early life ==
Syed Naseer Hussain was born in a Kannadiga Muslim family on 10 June 1970 in Channagiri, district Davanagere, Karnataka, India. His father is Syed Hafeez, and his mother is Late. Akhtar Unnisa. His father worked as traffic inspector with KSRTC (Karnataka State Road Transport Corporation) and was elected President of the KSRTC Employees’ Union. His mother retired as the Head Mistress of the Government Urdu Higher Primary School, Cowl Bazaar, Ballari. His parents resided in Ballari, Karnataka.

Since childhood, Naseer has been strongly influenced by his parents’ lives’ and thinking. His father’s life as a trade union leader who tirelessly worked for the betterment of labour and fought for their rights paved the way for Naseer’s social activism and commitment to fight for social justice. His parents encouraged modern education and were progressive in their outlook.

== Education and alma mater ==
Dr. Hussain spent his early years in Ballari, Karnataka. He completed his primary and high school education from St.Joseph’s English Medium Primary School and St.John’s High School, Ballari.

He was the Mass PT Leader in St. Joseph’s English Medium Primary School. He went on to become the President of Young Students Movement (an international organization), while he was at St. John’s High School, Ballari where he was also the President of Interact Club (Rotary).

He completed his PUC (Grade 12) from Vijayanagar College in Hospet, Karnataka. During this period, he served as the District President of Young Students Movement, Ballari.

Dr. Hussain graduated from St. Philomena’s College, Mysore with a Bachelor of Arts degree in History, Economics and Political Science in 1992 ^{[i]}. He was twice elected as Class Representative at St. Philomena’s College, Mysore, for two consecutive terms; 1989-1990 and 1990-1991 and was awarded Best Class Representative of the Student’s Union, St.Philomena’s College, both times. Thereafter, he was elected as President of St. Philomena’s College Student’s Union with huge margin for the term 1991-1992. The same year (1991-1992), he was nominated as the Secretary of Mysore City Students Action Committee.

He obtained his Masters’ degree in Political Science from the University of Mysore in 1994, during which period he was elected as the General Secretary of Mysore City Students Action Committee twice; first in 1992-1993 and subsequently in 1993-1994^{[ii]}.

In 1996, Dr.Naseer Hussain enrolled at Jawaharlal Nehru University, New Delhi (JNU), where he completed his M.Phil and Ph.D in International Relations. Continuing with his winning streak, Naseer was elected as Joint Secretary in 1997-1998, Vice President in 1998- 1999, and President in 1999-2000 of the JNU Student’s Union (JNUSU). He also served as the Vice-President, Karnataka Sanskrathika Sangha (Kannada Sangha) at JNU from 1997-2000.^{[iii]}

| Year | | Description |
| 1977-1984 | ● Grades 1 to 7 | ● St.Joseph’s English Medium Primary School, Ballari |
| 1984-1987 | ● Grades 8 to 10 | ● St.John’s High School, Ballari |
| 1987-1989 | ● Grades 11 and 12 | ● Vijayanagar College, Hospet (PUC) |
| 1989-1992 | ● B.A. in History, Economics and Political Science | ● St. Philomena’s College, Mysore |
| 1992-1994 | ● M.A. in Political Science | ● University of Mysore, Mysore |
| 1996-1998 | • M.Phil. in International Studies | ● Jawaharlal Nehru University (JNU), Delhi |
| 1998-2003 | • Ph.D. in International Studies | ● Jawaharlal Nehru University (JNU), Delhi |

== Educationist ==
For a brief period in the year 1996, Hussain taught political science in Devadurga Government College, Raichur District.

== In Indian Politics ==
Indian Youth Congress (IYC)

Dr. Hussain joined the Indian Youth Congress in March 2001. He was appointed as Chief Electoral Officer, IYC and was promoted as the Chief Election Authority, IYC in November 2001. In January 2002, he was given additional responsibility as the Observer In-charge of Jharkhand and Assam. In March 2003, he was appointed as the National Secretary of the Indian Youth Congress.

Karnataka Pradesh Congress Committee (KPCC)

He served as a Member of KPCC Manifesto Committee in 2017 for the Karnataka Assembly Elections, 2018. He was appointed Vice President, KPCC on 10 April 2022 and served till 20 August 2023.

All India Congress Committee (AICC)

In 2014, he became a National Media Panelist of the AICC and appeared on major television channels in four languages. Later on he was promoted as a National Spokesperson of the AICC on December 21, 2018.

In October 2022, he was appointed the campaign manager of AICC Presidential candidate, Shri. Mallikarjun Kharge. Subsequently, after the victory of Shri. Kharge, Dr. Hussain and three others were appointed as the coordinators of the office of the Congress President on November 11, 2022.

On August 20, 2023, he was appointed as a Member of the Congress Working Committee (CWC) and, thereafter on December 23, 2023, he was made in-charge of the Office of the President of Indian National Congress (INC).

On February 14, 2025, he was appointed as General Secretary, AICC, In-Charge of Jammu & Kashmir, and Ladakh.

In Parliament

Dr. Naseer Hussain was elected to the Rajya Sabha from Karnataka state on 23 March 2018 and was soon appointed Whip of the Congress Parliamentary Party in Rajya Sabha on 11 August 2021. He was re-elected to Rajya Sabha on 28 February 2024.

| Year | Description |
| 2006 - 2008 | ● Member, Cine Workers Welfare Board, Ministry of Labour, Government of India. (check Cine and Television) |
| 2008-2012 | ● Vice-Chairman, Central Advisory Board on Child Labour, Ministry of Labour, Government of India. |
| 2012-2014 | ● Vice-Chairman, Central Advisory Board on Beedi and Cigar Workers Fund, Ministry of Labour, Government of India. |
| April 2018 | ● Elected to Rajya Sabha. |
| September 2018 - May 2019 | ● Member, Committee on Water Resources. |
| June 2018 - May 2019 & October 2019 to 2024 | ● Member, Consultative Committee for the Ministry of Minority Affairs. |
| Sept. 2019 onwards | ● Member, Committee on Information Technology |
| Nov. 2019 - March 2021 | ● Member, Committee on Provision of Computers to Members of Rajya Sabha (PCMRS) |
| May 2021 to April 2022 | ● Member, Committee on Public Undertakings |
| May 2022 to April 2023 May 2023 to April 2024 | ● Member, Committee on Public Undertakings ● Member, Committee on Public Undertakings |
| September 2023 to April 2024 | ● Member, Committee on Communications and Information Technology |
| April 2024 | ● Re-elected to Rajya Sabha |
| August 2024 | ● Joint Committee on Waqf |
| September 2024 onwards | ● Member, Standing Committee on Labour, Textiles and Skill Development |
| 2024 onwards | ● Member, Consultative Committee, Social Justice and Empowerment |

== Suspensions ==
In his tenure as Member of Parliament, Hussain was suspended thrice for protesting against bills that infringed on social justice and security breach in Parliament.

=== Farm bills (2020) ===
On 22 September 2020, Hussain was suspended from the Rajya Sabha for one week after protesting the passage of the Farm Bills. He and several other MPs had raised slogans and staged a protest in the House over the manner in which the bills were passed, alleging that parliamentary procedures were flouted and the farmers’ interests were sidelined.

He was among the eight MPs who raised slogans of protest and demonstrated before Rajya Sabha deputy chairman Harivansh Rai Singh, for failing to follow House procedures over the passage of farm bills.

=== Labour codes (2021) ===
Suspended for protesting against labour codes.

The Farm Laws of 2021 were repealed after fourteen months of agitation by the farmers across the country, and opposition MPs continued to demand compensation for more than seventy of the lives lost during the agitation and for fixing MSPs for different commodities. Following the protests and demands, Hussain and eleven other opposition MPs were suspended for the winter session of the Parliament.

=== Parliament breach (2023) ===
December 14, 2023 - Suspended for protest against 2023 Indian Parliament breach

On December 14, 2023, a significant security breach occurred at the Indian Parliament when an individual scaled a 20-meter-high wall and entered the premises near the Garuda Gate. The intruder, identified as a 20-year-old man from Uttar Pradesh, was apprehended by security personnel shortly after gaining access.

The breach later led to the suspension of 146 opposition parliament members on claims of causing disorder, 95 from the Lok Sabha, and 46 from the Rajya Sabha. The suspensions were later condemned by Human Rights Watch.^{[xiv]} Allegedly, the intruders had gained access to the Lok Sabha with the help of sitting BJP MP.

== Humanitarian services ==
On 17 May 2021, Hussain performed the asthivisargan, last rites of Prof Savitri Vishwanathan who died of COVID-19. Prof.Savitri Vishwanathan, former head of the Chinese and Japanese Studies Department at Delhi University, was a family friend of Hussain's.

== Personal life ==
Syed Nasir Hussain married Mehnaz Ansari on 6 October 2003. The couple has two sons.
