= Bimba Raikar =

Indian politician (born 1933)

Member of Parliament, Rajya Sabha
- In office 2000–2006
- Constituency: Karnataka

Personal details
- Born: 21 December 1933 (age 92)
- Party: Indian National Congress

Bimba Raikar (born 21 December 1933) is an Indian politician. She was a Member of Parliament, representing Karnataka in the Rajya Sabha the upper house of India's Parliament as a member of the Indian National Congress.
