= Bhushan Lal Jangde =

Indian politician

Dr Bhushan Lal Jangde

MP of Rajya Sabha for Chhattisgarh
- In office 3 April 2012 – 2 April 2018
- Preceded by: Shreegopal Vyas, BJP
- Succeeded by: Saroj Pandey, BJP

Personal details
- Born: 4 October 1943 (age 82) Parsadih, Baloda Bazar district CG
- Party: BJP
- Profession: Politician

Dr Bhushan Lal Jangde is a Bharatiya Janata Party (BJP) politician. He was a Member of Parliament, representing Chhattisgarh in the Rajya Sabha the upper house of Indian Parliament succeeded by Saroj Pandey.

He is an Ayurveda physician.
