= Praveen Rashtrapal =

Indian politician

MP of Rajya Sabha for Gujarat
- In office 3 April 2012 – 12 May 2016 (death)

Personal details
- Born: 24 December 1939
- Died: 12 May 2016 (aged 76) Delhi
- Party: Indian National Congress

Shri Praveen Rashtrapal, a politician from Indian National Congress party, was a Member of the Parliament of India representing Gujarat in the Rajya Sabha, the upper house of the Parliament. He died on 12 May 2016.

== Career ==
He was an Assistant Commissioner of Income Tax, before he entered politics and represented the trade union movement of Income Tax employees and other Central Government employees, of India. Later he took up the role of AICC Secretary, in charge of Uttar Pradesh matters. Praveen Rashtrapal was elected to the 13th Lok Sabha, and in 2006 he was nominated by the Congress to the Rajya Sabha, from April 2006 to April 2012. Again he was re-elected in 2012. Rashtrapal was a member of the Joint Parliamentary Committee on 2G spectrum case in the 15th Lok Sabha.

== Death ==
He died on Thursday morning, 12 May 2016, due to a massive cardiac arrest, before he could be given any medical aid. His wife had already passed away and he is survived by three daughters and a son. He was succeeded by Parsottambhai Rupala, of Bharatiya Janata Party, in the Rajya Sabha.
