= Brij Bhushan Tiwari =

Indian politician and former Member of Parliament

Member of Parliament, Rajya Sabha
- In office 3 April 2012 – 25 April 2012
- Preceded by: Elected
- Succeeded by: Alok Tiwari

Member of Parliament, Rajya Sabha
- In office December 2006 – July 2010
- Preceded by: Casual Vacancy
- Succeeded by: Vacant

Member of Parliament, Lok Sabha for Domariaganj
- In office 1 June 1996 – 4 December 1997
- Preceded by: Rampal Singh
- Succeeded by: Rampal Singh
- Constituency: Domariaganj

Member of Parliament, Lok Sabha for Domariaganj
- In office 2 December 1989 – 13 March 1991
- Preceded by: Kazi Jalil Abbasi
- Succeeded by: Rampal Singh
- Constituency: Domariaganj

Member of Parliament, Lok Sabha for Khalilabad
- In office 23 March 1977 – 22 August 1979
- Preceded by: Keshav Dev Malviya
- Succeeded by: Krishna Chandra Pandey
- Constituency: Khalilabad

Personal details
- Born: 13 October 1941 Jamuni, Uttar Pradesh, India
- Died: April 25, 2012 (aged 70) New Delhi, India
- Party: Samajwadi Party
- Other political affiliations: Janata Partyn (1977); Janata Dal (1989)
- Spouse: Nirmala Tiwari
- Children: 5 (including Alok Tiwari, Pawan Tiwari)
- Education: Allahabad University

Brij Bhushan Tiwari (13 October 1941 – 25 April 2012) was an Indian politician belonging to the Samajwadi Party. He served as a Member of Parliament in both the Lok Sabha (lower house) and the Rajya Sabha (upper house) representing Uttar Pradesh. A veteran socialist leader, he also served as the National Vice-President of the Samajwadi Party.

== Early life and education ==
Brij Bhushan Tiwari was born on 13 October 1941 in Jamuni village of Siddharthnagar district, Uttar Pradesh. He completed his higher education at Allahabad University, where he served as the President of the Students' Union in 1964–65. He was actively inspired by the socialist icon Ram Manohar Lohia during his student life.

== Political career ==
Tiwari had a long and distinguished legislative career spanning over three decades, serving multiple terms in both houses of the Indian Parliament. He was involved in the socialist movement and was jailed for 19 months during the 1975 Emergency.

=== Party leadership ===
Apart from his parliamentary responsibilities, Tiwari was a key organizational figure within the Samajwadi Party, where he held the position of National Vice-President.

== Death ==
Just hours after taking his second oath as a Rajya Sabha member on 24 April 2012, Tiwari suffered a fatal cardiac arrest. He died on 25 April 2012 in New Delhi at the age of 70.
