= Jadambi Mandal =

Indian politician

Member of Parliament, Rajya Sabha
- In office 1996-2000
- Constituency: Bihar

Personal details
- Born: 1 January 1929
- Died: 23 February 2000 (aged 71)
- Party: Rashtriya Janata Dal
- Other political affiliations: Janata Dal
- Spouse: Geeta Devi

Jadambi Mandal was an Indian politician. He was a Member of Parliament, representing Bihar in the Rajya Sabha the upper house of India's Parliament as a member of the Rashtriya Janata Dal.
