= Swati Maliwal =

Indian social activist and politician (born 1984)

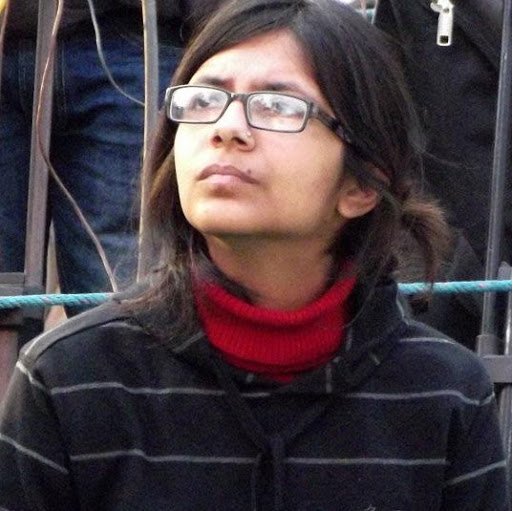
- Maliwal in January 2015

Member of Parliament, Rajya Sabha
- Incumbent
- Assumed office 28 January 2024
- Preceded by: Sushil Kumar Gupta
- Constituency: Delhi

Chairperson of Delhi Commission for Women
- In office July 2015 – 19 January 2024

Personal details
- Born: 15 October 1984 (age 42) Ghaziabad, Uttar Pradesh, India
- Party: Bharatiya Janata Party (since 2026)
- Other political affiliations: Aam Aadmi Party (2012–2026)
- Spouse: Naveen Jaihind (m. 2012–2020)
- Profession: Politician; activist

Swati Maliwal (born 15 October 1984) is an Indian social activist and politician. She currently serves as a Member of Parliament in the Rajya Sabha representing Delhi. She participated in the 2011 Indian anti-corruption movement led by social activist Anna Hazare and later, served as the chairperson of the Delhi Commission for Women (DCW) from 2015 to 2024.

== Early and personal life ==
Maliwal was born in Ghaziabad, Uttar Pradesh on 15 October 1984. Her father was an officer of the Indian Armed Forces and her mother was Sangita Maliwal. She went to Amity International School and received a bachelor's degree in Information Technology from the JSS Academy of Technical Education.

On 23 January 2012, she married Naveen Jaihind, whom she had met during the early days of the 2011 Indian anti-corruption movement led by Anna Hazare. Later, Naveen became a politician, representing the Aam Aadmi Party. The couple divorced in February 2020.

In 2023, Maliwal accused her father of sexually assaulting & abusing her in her childhood. The news was well covered by various media houses, but later overshadowed by several other controversies around her.

== Social and political life ==
After her education, she joined a non-governmental organization named "Parivartan" which was founded by Arvind Kejriwal and Manish Sisodia among others. She worked in grass-roots campaigns across India, as a part of the organization. In 2011, Maliwal was one of the committee that organized the India Against Corruption movement led by activist Anna Hazare, which later led to the passage of the Jan Lokpal Bill.

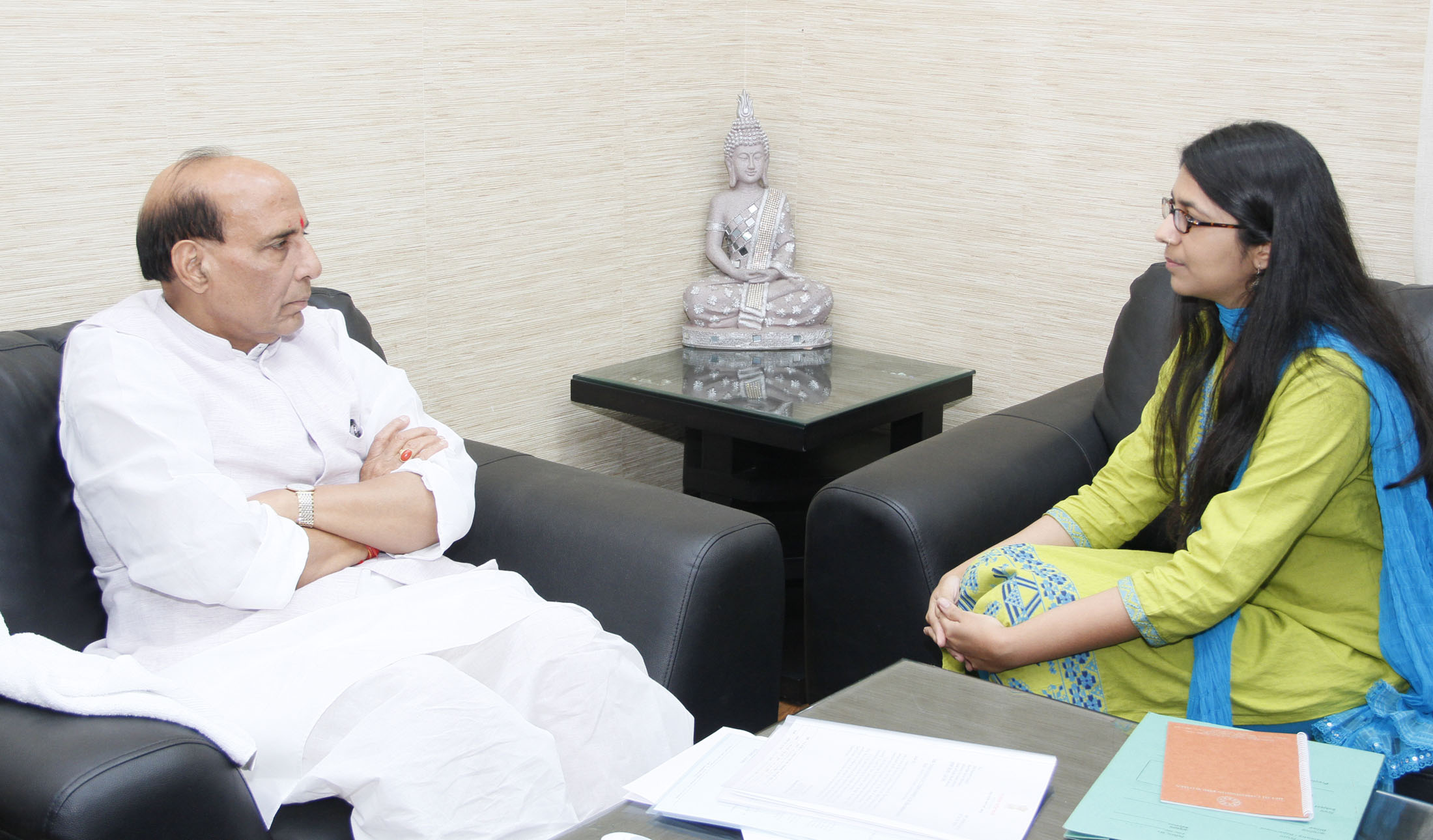
Maliwal with Rajnath Singh, then Minister of Home Affairs in 2015

She was appointed as the chairperson of Delhi Commission for Women (DCW) in July 2015. She was one of the youngest to lead the women's commission. She advocated for the passage of the Juvenile Justice (Care and Protection of Children) Act, 2015, which allowed minors from the ages of 16–18 years, to be tried as adults in case of heinous crimes. During her tenure as the chairperson of DCW, she demanded greater accountability of Delhi police, which resulted in putting the commission in loggerheads with the police department.

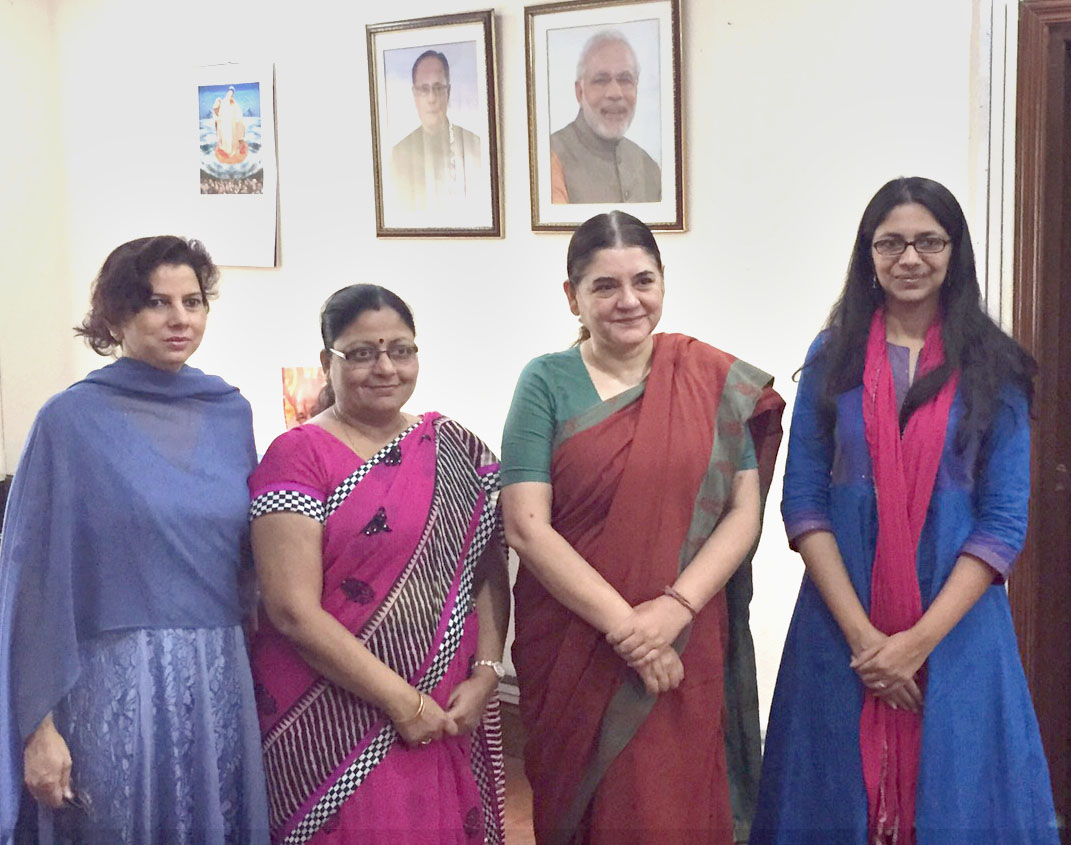
Maliwal (right most) with Maneka Gandhi (third from left), then Minister of Women and Child Development in 2015

In 2016, based on a petition by the commission, the Delhi High Court directed all police stations in Delhi to install CCTV cameras on their premises. In December 2016, based on the direction of the Delhi High Court on a petition by the DCW, a special task force on women safety was constituted in Delhi. In 2017, following the commission's request, Delhi police officers were asked to wear body cameras while on duty, to improve their accountability and reduce chances of misconduct.

In April 2018, she went on a 10-day hunger strike demanding several reforms including the passage of laws mandating death penalty for individuals who rape children, recruiting police under the United Nations standards and more accountability of the police. In 2019, she went on another hunger strike demanding expedited justice to rape survivors, correct utilization of Nirbhaya Fund and additional police resources to handle crimes against women. She organized multiple campaigns and protests, advocating for time-bound stringent punishment for rapists and women safety.

In 2019, she led a 13-day march, covering crime-prone areas of Delhi to raise awareness about gender-based violence among local communities and register grievances. In November 2020, the DCW under Maliwal was involved in rescuing girls from child traffickers in Jharkhand. During the 2023–2024 Manipur violence, Maliwal visited the state in July 2023 to gather details and sent her recommendations to the President of India.

During her tenure, the commission handled more than 1.7 lakh cases of domestic violence, rape and other crimes against women. During her tenure, over 50,000 Mahila Panchayats were organized which served as community meetings for dispute resolution. Crisis Intervention Centre (CIC) and Rape Crisis Cell (RCC) were established, which provided medical attention, legal support and counseling to rape survivors. During her tenure, the DCW also addressed child trafficking and acid attack cases, which led to a passage of new laws regulating the working of spas, rehabilitation and free treatment for acid attack victims, as well as the ban of the retail sale of acid.

In January 2024, she was elected as a Member of Parliament in the Rajya Sabha representing Delhi.

On 24 April 2026, she switched to the Bharatiya Janata Party along with a faction of 6 other AAP Rajya Sabha MPs led by Raghav Chadha.

== Allegation of assault ==
On 13 May 2024, Maliwal alleged that she was assaulted by Bibhav Kumar, the personal assistant to then Delhi chief minister Arvind Kejriwal, at the chief minister's residence. Maliwal reported the incident to the Police Control Room, leading to the registration of a First Information Report (FIR) by the Delhi Police on 16 May at the Civil Lines Police Station.

Vibhav Kumar was arrested by Police on 18 May. He was sent to police custody for five days. On 24 May, he was sent to four days of judicial custody, following which he was again remanded to police custody for three days. The Lower Courts and the Delhi High Court denied Bail to Kumar. On 2 September 2024, Bibhav Kumar was granted bail by the Supreme Court, though the court imposed strict conditions on Kumar's bail. He was barred from being reinstated as the personal secretary to the chief minister or holding any political office associated with the chief minister's office. Additionally, Kumar was prohibited from entering the chief minister's residence until all witnesses in the case had been examined.

The Delhi Police hinted at a larger conspiracy, but it filed a 500-page charge sheet with 50 witnesses in July 2024 only against Vibhav Kumar.
