= Shanta Vasisht =

Indian politician

Shanta Vasisht (born ca. 1926) is an Indian politician. During the 1950s and 1960s she served as minister in the Delhi state government and as a member of the Rajya Sabha.

== Student years ==
Vasisht studied law at the University of Delhi. Her father, L.D. Vasisht, served as Chief Administrative Officer of the Ministry of Defence. During her student years she was active in the Delhi branch of the Indian National Congress and worked with the Kingsway Refugee Committee. In 1950 she studied social work at the University of Chicago, through a Foreign Student scholarship of the Kappa Alpha Theta sorority.

== Delhi Assembly ==
Upon her return to India, Vasisht contested the 1952 Delhi Legislative Assembly election. Vasisht stood as the Congress Party candidate in the Kotla Feroze Shah constituency. She won the seat, defeating V.P. Joshi of the Bharatiya Jan Sangh. In total Vasisht obtained 4,646 votes (56.26% of the votes in the constituency). In 1953 she was appointed by the Chief Minister of Delhi Chaudhary Brahm Prakash as Deputy Minister for Education in the Delhi State government. Her nomination was criticised by a minority faction inside the Congress Legislature Party in Delhi, who claimed that the Chief Minister shouldn't have nominated deputy ministers without consulting the assembly members of the party.

Vasisht took part in the reviving of the Delhi Library Association in 1954, and served as longest president of the association.

== Rajya Sabha ==
Vasisht was elected to the Rajya Sabha (the upper house of the Parliament of India) in 1960. Her term lasted from 3 April 1960 to 2 April 1966, under the governments of Jawaharlal Nehru, Lal Bahadur Shastri and Indira Gandhi.

== Later period ==
In 2008 Vasisht released the book Nehru to Iraq, which details her experiences in the struggle for Indian Independence. As of 2013, Vasisht resided in the Sarvodaya Enclave.
