= Syed Azeez Pasha =

Indian politician

Syed Azeez Pasha (born 27 February 1945) is an Indian politician from Communist Party of India, was a Member of the Parliament of India representing Andhra Pradesh in the Rajya Sabha, the upper house of the Parliament from 3 April 2006 to 2 April 2012.

He founded All India Tanzeem-e-Insaaf in 2013 and working as the President of the Organisation since then. He is currently National Secretary of Communist Party of India.

== Early life and education ==
Syed Azeez Pasha was born on 27 February 1945 to Syed Yaseen Pasha and Syeda Bathool Bee at Humnabad, Bidar district of Karnataka.

Pasha completed his education in B.A LLB from Osmania University Law College, Hyderabad.

== Personal life ==
Syed Azeez Pasha was married to Syeda Daulath Fatima on 24 August 1972 and they have 3 children together.
