= Sanjay Singh (AAP politician) =

Indian politician (born 1972)

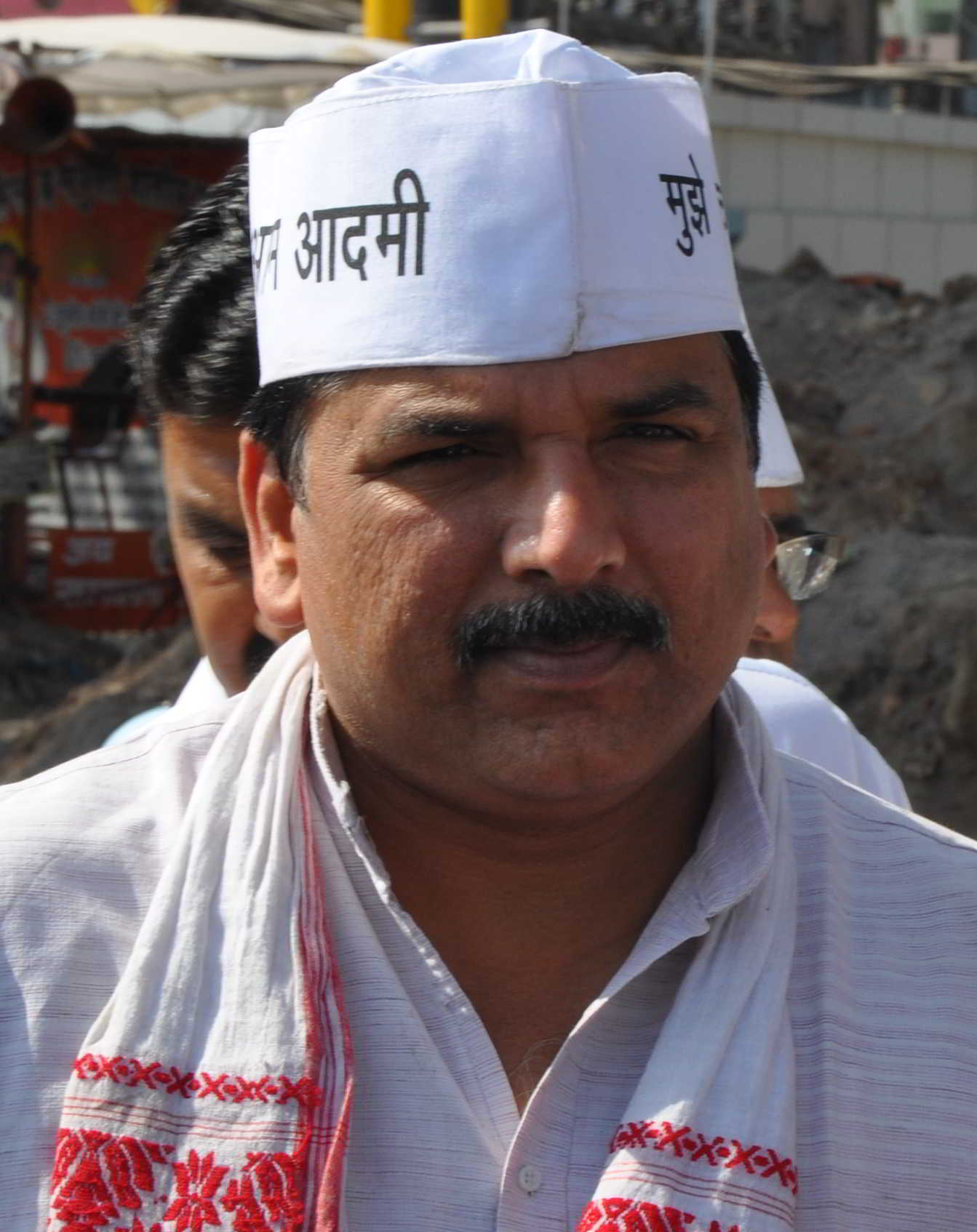
- Singh in 2013

Member of Parliament, Rajya Sabha
- Incumbent
- Assumed office 28 January 2018
- Preceded by: Karan Singh
- Constituency: Delhi

Personal details
- Born: 22 March 1972 (age 54) Sultanpur, Uttar Pradesh, India
- Party: Aam Aadmi Party (AAP)
- Other political affiliations: Samajwadi Party (until 2007)
- Spouse: Anita Singh
- Children: 2
- Education: Diploma in Mining Engineering
- Profession: Politician; activist
- Website: sanjaysingh.org.in

Sanjay Singh (born 22 March 1972) is an Indian politician and activist, currently serving as a Member of Parliament for Delhi since 2018. Singh is also the national spokesman for the Aam Aadmi Party.

He was active with Arvind Kejriwal in his campaigns, spanning from the Right to Information endeavour in 2006 to the IAC movement led by social activist Anna Hazare.

== Personal life ==
He was born on 22 March 1972 in Sultanpur, Uttar Pradesh. He was born in a middle-class family, his parents were government teachers.

He completed a diploma in mining engineering from Orissa School of Mining Engineering, Keonjhar in 1993.

He is married and has a family residing in Delhi. Before joining politics, he founded the Azad Samaj Seva Samiti in Lucknow in 1994 and worked for the welfare of miners and street hawkers.

== Career ==
=== Activism ===
He formed the Azad Samaj Seva Samiti in Lucknow in 1994, which he has described as an initiative aimed at providing employment opportunities to economically disadvantaged communities.

He has been a fellow companion of socialist leader Raghu Thakur of the Democratic Socialist Party and participated in various welfare and socialist conferences and movements along with him. Singh also proffered his services for disaster relief operations in Gujarat, Uttarakhand, Jammu and Kashmir, Tamil Nadu and Nepal.

=== Aam Aadmi Party ===
Singh is a founder member of Aam Aadmi Party. During the 2020 Delhi elections, he was designated the campaign in-charge along with Pankaj Gupta, who was entrusted the duties of the campaign director.

=== Career as MP ===
In January 2018, Singh was elected as a Member of Parliament in Rajya Sabha from Delhi.

During the furore and public outcry over the passing of the 2020 Indian agriculture acts by the BJP-led central government, Sanjay Singh, along with seven other members of the opposition, were suspended from the Rajya Sabha by its Deputy Chairman for conducting protests within the Parliament.

Three years later, in 2023, Singh was suspended from the Rajya Sabha yet again for the entirety of the monsoon session by Vice President Jagdeep Dhankhar after he protested against the BJP-led central government for introducing a bill to pave the way for its paramountcy over the elected government in Delhi on matters related to administration of services in the state, and for demanding that Prime Minister Narendra Modi break his prolonged silence on the ethnic conflict marring Manipur and issue a statement.

Singh raised concerns related to, inter alia, child deaths, child trafficking, stringent punishments for sexual abuse of children in the Parliament of India. He was felicitated with the PGC Award by UNICEF India in 2020 for his efforts.

Singh was nominated for another tenure as a Member of Parliament in the Rajya Sabha in January 2024.

=== Cases ===
In 2016, he accused Bikram Singh Majithia, the then Revenue Minister for Punjab, for being a "drug dealer". In turn, Majithia filed a defamation suit against him, Arvind Kejriwal and Ashish Khetan. Later, AAP president Arvind Kejriwal apologised to Majithia for his party's slander against him. As of 2022, Singh admitted in the court that he stands by his statement.

During the heyday of the Rafale deal controversy, wherein grave charges were levelled against the BJP government stemming from alleged financial and procedural irregularities in the procurement of combat jets for the Indian Air Force, Sanjay Singh received a notice from an Ahmedabad civil court in the state of Gujarat owing to a defamation suit lodged by Anil Ambani and several of his companies, primarily Reliance Defence Limited. Anil Ambani, an industrialist and the younger brother of Mukesh Ambani, enjoys close ties to the ruling regime of India.

In 2017, Singh was assaulted by a woman worker of the AAP.

In January 2023, a special court in Sultanpur of Uttar Pradesh convicted him and sentenced him to three months in prison for protesting against frequent power cuts in Sultanpur in 2001. He is currently out on bail. The Allahabad High Court, however, stayed the sentence in August 2024, observing that the judgments of both the trial court and the sessions court (which upheld the verdict) are "perverse". The High Court further stated that a prima facie examination of the verdicts of the two lower courts seem to be missing the ingredients of sections 143 and 391 of the Indian Penal Code, provisions under which Singh was charged.

==== Delhi liquor excise policy case ====
In February 2021, the AAP government in Delhi introduced a bill to allow the cessation of state government involvement in the sale of liquor, paving the way for the issuance of licensing to private enterprises. The government stated that divesting the state from involvement in the sale of liquor was necessary to ensure it fulfilled its mandate as a regulatory and taxation authority; furthermore, it stated that privatisation was necessary to bolster competition in a domain previously the sole monopoly of the government: competitive bidding for liquor vending zones by private enterprises would bolster revenue while concurrently encouraging competition, thereby tending to consumer welfare.

The ratification of this policy triggered a raft of allegations from the Indian National Congress and the BJP, the principal political adversaries of the Aam Aadmi Party, which alleged "corruption" in its implementation. Singh was named as an accomplice in the chargesheet filed by the Enforcement Directorate (ED), an agency tasked with combating financial crimes under the jurisdiction of the central government led by the BJP, before the Rouse Avenue district court in New Delhi. The BJP-led central government has been the subject of severe criticism for misusing central investigative agencies to harass members of the opposition, particularly the Aam Aadmi Party. Since the introduction of the Prevention of Money Laundering Act, 2002 (PMLA), the principal legislative instrument empowering the ED to combat financial crime, the conviction rate as a proportion of total cases registered by it stands at an abysmal 0.65%.

In October 2023, he was arrested by the ED in connection with the alleged irregularities and was held in Tihar Jail until he was granted bail in April 2024.

Singh’s pre-trial detention, without the ED furnishing any prima facie evidence or credible proof indicating his involvement in the alleged irregularities, has triggered severe criticism owing to Section 24 of the Prevention of Money Laundering Act governing bail. The provision effectively flips the presumption of innocence by placing the burden on the accused to satisfy the court of their innocence in order to be considered for bail. This broader inversion of criminal procedure is further reinforced by Section 45, under which stringent bail conditions were initially struck down by the Supreme Court of India as unconstitutional, only to be effectively reinstated through successive amendments introduced by the BJP-led central government. These changes were enacted as money bills, thereby bypassing the upper house of the Parliament of India to avoid parliamentary scrutiny.

===== Acquittal =====
In February 2026, the Rouse Avenue district court acquitted Sanjay Singh of all charges, stating that there was "no overarching conspiracy or criminal intent in the excise policy". The presiding magistrate also rapped the Central Bureau of Investigation (CBI) conducting a botched probe and recommended a departmental enquiry against the officials who oversaw the investigation. The court further stated the CBI failed to produce any evidence indicating implication in the alleged irregularities, and that its probe failed to attain even the threshold necessary for suspicion.

== Election History ==
=== Rajya Sabha ===
Position	Party	Constituency	From	To	Tenure
Member of Parliament, Rajya Sabha (1st Term)	AAP	N.C.T. Delhi	28 January 2018	27 January 2024	5 years, 364 days
Member of Parliament, Rajya Sabha (2nd Term)	AAP	N.C.T. Delhi	28 January 2024	27 January 2030	2 years, 269 days

== See also ==
- Jan Lokpal Bill 2011

Rajya Sabha
Preceded by ?	Member of Parliament in Rajya Sabha for Delhi; 28 January 2018 –	Incumbent
Aam Aadmi Party political offices
New political party	Member of Political Affairs Committee of AAP; 2012 – present	Incumbent
New political party	Member of National Executive Committee of AAP ? – present	Incumbent
