= Mabel Rebello =

Indian politician

Member of Parliament, Rajya Sabha
- In office 3 April 2006 – 2 April 2012
- Constituency: Jharkhand

Personal details
- Born: 26 March 1950 (age 76) Kundapura, Karnataka
- Party: INC
- As of 22 November, 2010

Miss Mabel Rebello (born 1950) is a politician from Indian National Congress party and a Member of the Parliament of India representing Jharkhand in the Rajya Sabha, the upper house of the Indian Parliament.

She was a Member of the National Commission for Minorities, Government of India and completed her term in 2016.

== Political Reception ==
Mabel used to be the backroom brain running the Congress affairs and assisting Sonia Gandhi in multiple areas.

During atrocities on Christians who are minorities as Member of Parliament, she stated that the fringe groups create problems as majority Hindus are secular and broad minded people.
