= R. Ramakrishna =

Indian politician (born 1934)

MP of Rajya Sabha for Karnataka
- In office 3 April 2012 – 2 April 2018
- Succeeded by: Syed Naseer Hussain, INC

Personal details
- Born: Rangasayee Ramakrishna; 15 March 1934 (age 91); Chidambaram, Cuddalore district, Tamil Nadu, British India
- Political party: Bharatiya Janata Party
- Spouse: Shanta

Rangasayee Ramakrishna (born 15 March 1934) is an Indian politician of the Bharatiya Janata Party. He was also a civil servant and political activist.

== Life and career ==
Ramakrishna joined the Indian Administrative Service in 1957 and served in different positions till his retirement in 1992. He is Active Member of BJP since 1995 and was Co-convener of Economic Cell of BJP during 1995–2000; He is National Convener of Election Cell of BJP since 1998 and is Permanent Invitee in the National Executive of BJP.

He was elected to Rajya Sabha from state of Karnataka of the ticket of BJP in April 2012.

His wife, Dr Shanta Ramakrishna, is a retired professor from JNU New Delhi.
