= Ajay Sancheti =

Indian politician

Member of Parliament, Rajya Sabha
- In office 3 April 2012 – 2 April 2018
- Constituency: Maharashtra

Personal details
- Born: 22 October 1965
- Party: BJP
- Spouse: Savita Sancheti
- Children: Nirbhay Sancheti & Varun Sancheti
- Education: G S Commerce College Nagpur
- Profession: Politician, Industrialist

Ajay Sancheti (born 22 October 1965) is Member of Rajya Sabha belongs to Bharatiya Janata Party. He is a Member of Parliament, representing Maharashtra in the Rajya Sabha the upper house of Indian Parliament.

== Early life ==
Sancheti was born to Vijaya Sancheti and Shaktikumar Sancheti.

== Family and personal life ==
Ajay Sancheti married Savita on 15 February 1989. They have two sons. Shri. Ajay Shaktikumar Sancheti - Non Executive Vice Chairman A Commerce Graduate. He started his career in 1985 with a Coal Mine Construction Project. He has excellent managerial and interpersonal skills for business development. Owing & opening of Indonesian Coal mine is a major breakthrough. He has extensively travelled worldwide and widely known for his public relations. Heading/representing many social & Professional Bodies

=== Legislative ===
- May 2012 onwards Member, Committee on Ministry of Urban Development
- Member of Constitution (One Hundred and Twenty Second Amendment) Bill 2014, Since 12 May 2015
- Member Payment and Settlement Systems (Amendment) Bill 2014, Since 23 December 2014
- Member of Finance Committee since 1 September 2015
