= A. V. Swamy =

Indian politician (1929–2019)

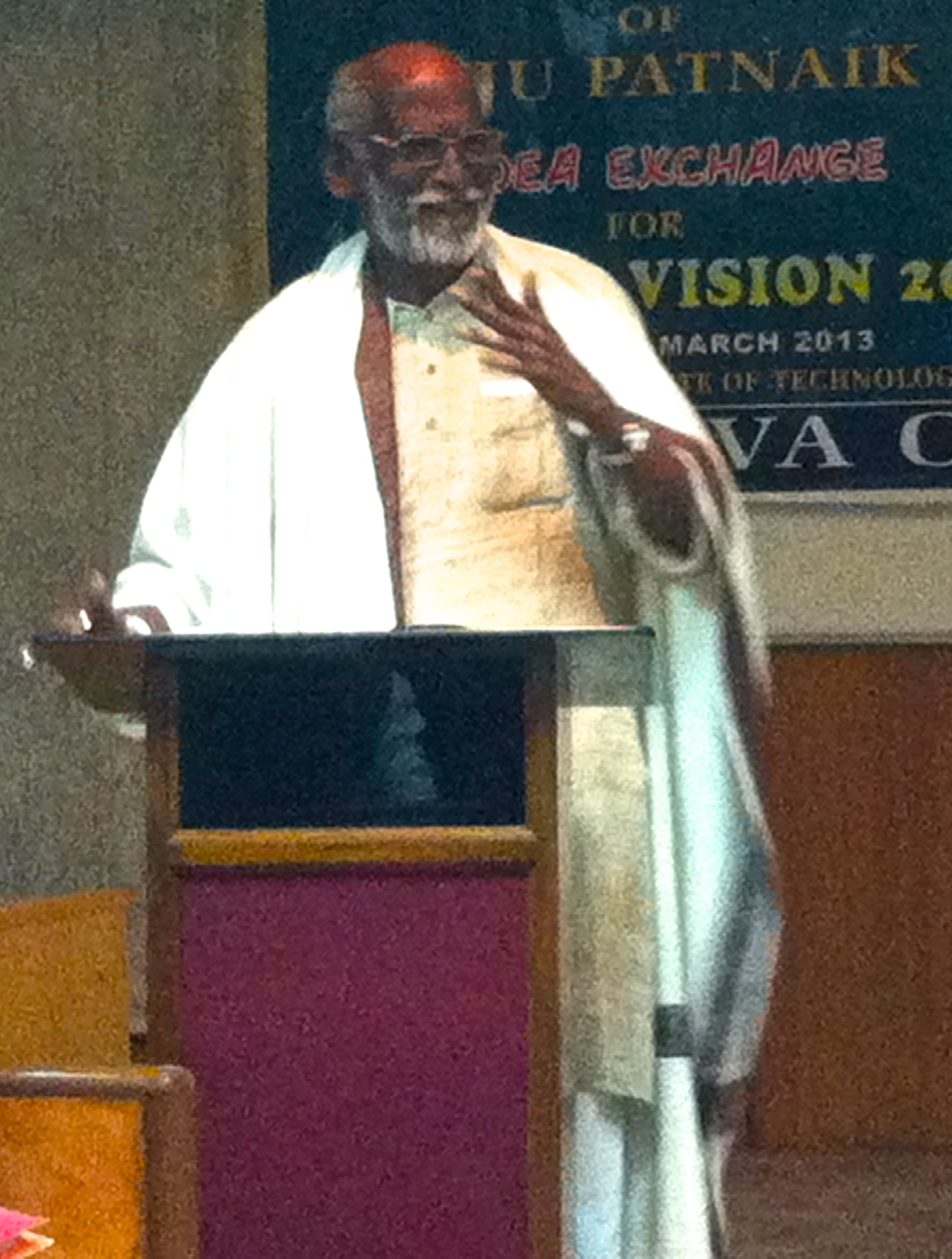
- A.V. Swamy addressing a public gathering in New Delhi.

Member of Parliament, Rajya Sabha
- In office 4 April 2012 – 3 April 2018
- Succeeded by: Achyuta Samanta, BJD
- Constituency: Odisha

Personal details
- Born: 14 January 1929 Nawarangpur, Odisha, British India
- Died: 31 December 2019 (aged 90)
- Spouse: Alajangi Kalavati
- Children: 5
- Profession: Politician

Alajangi Veerabhadra Swamy (14 January 1929 – 31 December 2019) was an Indian politician from the Odisha state. He was elected to the Rajya Sabha the Upper house of Indian Parliament from Odisha as an Independent candidate. Swamy died on 31 December 2019, at the age of 90, several years after suffering a stroke.
