= R. C. Singh =

Indian politician

R.C. Singh was a member of the Rajya Sabha representing West Bengal and a member of the Communist Party of India. He served as an active leader of the AITUC union and was appointed as the State President of AITUC in West Bengal.
