= P. R. Rajan =

Indian politician

P. R. Rajan, a politician from the Communist Party of India (Marxist), was a Member of the Parliament of India, representing Kerala in the Rajya Sabha, the upper house of the Indian Parliament. He died in 2014.
