= Alok Tiwari =

Indian politician

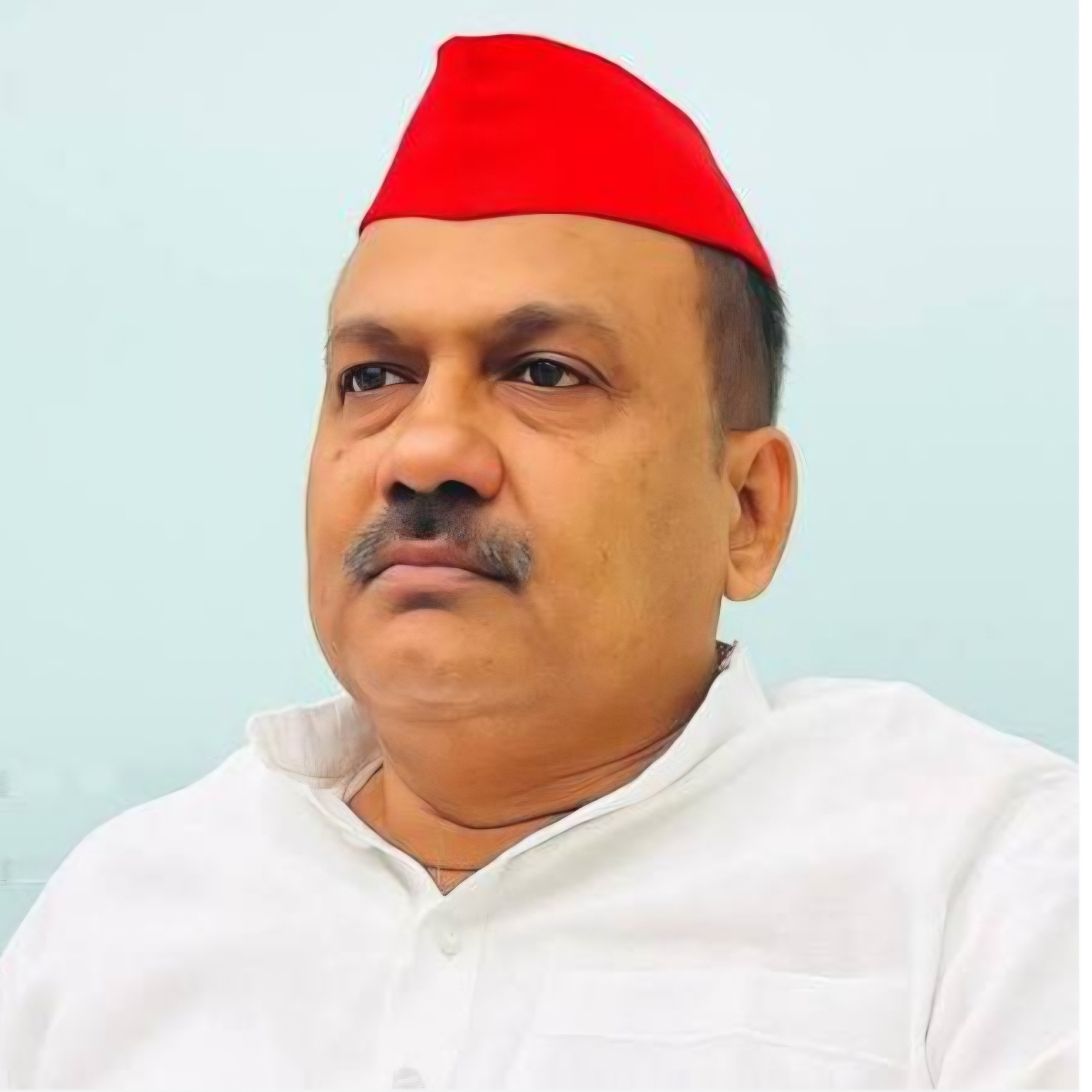

Member of Parliament, Rajya Sabha
- In office 18 June 2012 – 2 April 2018
- Leader: Manmohan Singh; Narendra Modi
- Preceded by: Brij Bhushan Tiwari

Personal details
- Born: 1 June 1972 (age 54) Jamuni, Siddharthnagar district, Uttar Pradesh, India
- Citizenship: Indian
- Party: Samajwadi Party
- Parent: Brij Bhushan Tiwari (father)
- Education: University of Delhi (graduate)
- Profession: Politician

Alok Tiwari (born 1 June 1972) is an Indian politician belonging to the Samajwadi Party (SP).

From 2012 to 2018, he represented the state of Uttar Pradesh as a Member of Parliament in the Rajya Sabha.

== Early life and education ==
Alok Tiwari was born on 1 June 1972 in Jamuni Village, located in the Siddharthnagar district of Uttar Pradesh.

He is the son of the veteran politician and former Rajya Sabha member, Brij Bhushan Tiwari. He graduated from the University of Delhi.

== Political career ==
Tiwari entered active legislative politics in mid-2012 following the sudden demise of his father, Brij Bhushan Tiwari, who passed away shortly after taking his oath as a Rajya Sabha member.

In the subsequent by-election held in June 2012, Tiwari was elected unopposed to fill the vacant parliamentary seat from Uttar Pradesh. He served the remainder of the term until 2 April 2018.

=== Parliamentary performance ===
During his tenure as an MP (2012–2018), Tiwari maintained an active legislative record in the Rajya Sabha. He recorded a attendance rate of 94%.
