= Rajniti Prasad =

Indian politician

Rajniti Prasad (Hindi: राजनीति प्रसाद, Rājnīti Prasād, born 9 August 1946) is a politician from Rashtriya Janata Dal party, and a Member of the Parliament representing Bihar in the Rajya Sabha since 2006, the upper house of the Parliament of India. He came into limelight by tearing lokpal bill documents in Rajya Sabha while his party leader and former Bihar chief Minister Lalu Prasad Yadav looked on from visitors gallery of the Parliament of India. Opposition leaders called this event as the murder of the democracy.

== Tearing document in Rajya Sabha ==
On 29 December 2011, during discussion on Lokpal bill, Prasad snatched lokpal bill document from the hands of Minister of State in the Prime Minister's Office(PMO), Narayanswami while debating the Lokpal Bill in the House. Opposition parties like BJP, CPI have accused Indian National Congress and Rastriya Janata Dal of choreographing the whole debate and said that the government was running away from the House because it is in minority. Later Prasad clarified his stand by saying that he doesn't regret his behavior and he did it spontaneously to oppose lokpal bill, which will investigate Members of Parliament against corruption. He also stated that he doesn't want to cut the same branch on which he is sitting and harm himself.

== Trivia ==
In Hindi, his first name Rajniti (Hindi: राजनीति, Rājnīti) means "politics".
