= N. D. Gupta =

Indian politician

Member of Parliament, Rajya Sabha
- Incumbent
- Assumed office 28 January 2018
- Preceded by: Janardan Dwivedi
- Constituency: National Capital Territory of Delhi

Personal details
- Born: 16 October 1945 (age 80) Sonipat, British India
- Party: Aam Aadmi Party
- Spouse: Veena Gupta (m. 1971)
- Education: Shri Ram College of Commerce (BCom); Delhi University
- Occupation: Member of Parliament Rajya Sabha

Narain Dass Gupta (born 16 October 1945) is an Indian politician and chartered accountant who is serving as member of parliament Rajya Sabha from NCT of Delhi and previously served as the president of Institute of Chartered Accountants of India (ICAI). He is a financial policy expert who has written several books on taxation.

He is the first Indian to be elected on the Board of International Federation of Accountants, U.S.A (a federation of 164 regulatory accounting bodies of 116 countries). He passed B.Com (H) from Shri Ram College of Commerce, Delhi University and was awarded Outstanding Alumni Award for outstanding achievement in his sphere of activity thereby bringing honor to his alma mater which was given by the then Prime Minister of India, Sh. Atal Bihari Vajpayee on 30 November 2001. Through support and help from professional colleagues, a modest contribution of Rs. 51 lakhs was handed over to then Prime Minister of India, towards Prime Minister's National Relief Fund. He has passed his CA examinations with distinction.

== Early life ==
N. D. Gupta was born on 16 October 1945, the third of the seven children of Fimo Devi and Rameshwar Dass Gupta. His father Rameshwar Dass Gupta was Sarpanch of Village Guhna, Sonipat District of Haryana. His son CA Naveen N D Gupta has been president of ICAI.

== Positions as member of parliament, Rajya Sabha (2018–24) ==
• Chairman : Parliamentary Standing Committee on Information & Communication Technology Management in Rajya Sabha

• Member : Parliamentary Standing Committee on Petroleum & Natural Gas

• Member : Parliamentary Standing Committee on Energy

• Member : House Committee Rajya Sabha

• Member : Parliamentary Consultative Committee of Commerce & Industry

• Member : Standing Committee on Rules

• Member : General Purposes Committee

=== Positions held ===
Narain Dass Gupta has been elected 2 times as Rajya Sabha MP.

#	From	To	Position	Party
1.	2018	2024	MP (1st term) in Rajya Sabha from NCT of Delhi	AAP
2.	2024	Present	MP (2nd term) in Rajya Sabha from NCT of Delhi	AAP

== Biography ==
Narain Dass Gupta was the President of Institute of Chartered Accountants of India(2001–02). He was the candidate of the Aam Aadmi Party for the Rajya Sabha. On 8 January 2018 he was elected unopposed. He was renominated for his second term in Council of States by Aam Aadmi Party on 5 January 2024 and declared elected unopposed on 12 January 2024. He was the second member of parliament in Rajya Sabha to take oath in the New Parliament Chamber inaugurated by Hon'ble Prime Minister of India Shri Narendra Modi.

== Early life ==
N D Gupta was born on 16 October 1945, the third of the seven children of Fimo Devi and Rameshwar Dass Gupta. His father Rameshwar Dass Gupta was Sarpanch of Village Guhna, Sonipat District of Haryana. His son CA Naveen N D Gupta has been president of ICAI.

== Positions in Regulatory & Governmental/Semi Governmental Authorities ==
• Trustee : National Pension Fund System, Pension Fund Regulatory & Development Authority ( 2015–2017)

• President: Institute of Chartered Accountants of India (ICAI), (2001–02)

• Vice President: Institute of Chartered Accountants of India (ICAI), (2000–01)

• Chairman, Group to identify gaps and implement Accounting Standards in Banks constituted by the Reserve Bank of India (2002–2003).

• Board Member of Insurance Regulatory & Development Authority, Government of India (2001–2002)

• Board Member, International Accounting Standards Committee (IASC), UK (2000–2001) (presently known as International Accounting Standards Board)

• Board Member, International Federation of Accountants (IFAC), USA ( 2001–2004)

• Member, National Advisory Committee on Accounting Standard (NACAS) constituted by the Ministry of Company Affairs, Government of India (2001–2002).

• Board Member nominated by S.E.B.I. on the Board of Directors of Delhi Stock Exchange and elected by the Board as its Chairman (1996–98) & (2002–2004)

• Member, Working Group on Consolidated Accounting and Other Quantitative Methods to Facilitate Consolidated Supervision, Reserve Bank of India (2001–2002).

• Member, Central Direct Taxes Advisory Committee, Ministry of Finance, Government of India (2001–2002).

• Member, Audit Advisory Board, Comptroller & Auditor General of India (2001–2002)

• Member, Committee of Central Board of Direct Taxes, Ministry of Finance to revise and rationalize the Tax Return Forms.

• Member, Sales-Tax Advisory Committee of Government of Delhi (2001–2003)

• Trustee, Bombay Port Trust under Ministry of Surface Transport, Government of India (1992–1996).

• Member, Technical Advisory Group of Ministry of Planning and Programme Implementation, Government of India (1996–1997).

• Member, Group for Economic Survey of India, Ministry of Planning & Programme Implementation, Government of India (1996–1997).

== Positions held in Educational Bodies ==
• Chairman, Board of Governors, Motilal Nehru National Institute of Technology, MHRD, Government of India (2005–2011)

• Member, Academic Council (Apex body), Guru Gobind Singh Indraprastha University, Govt. of Delhi (2005–2008)

• President: Institute of Chartered Accountants of India (ICAI) (2001–02)

• Member, Governing Body of Deen Dayal Upadhyay College, Delhi University (2001–2003)

• Board Member, International Federation of Accountants (IFAC), USA (2001–2004) (First Indian to be elected on the board of the International federation of the 164 regulatory accounting bodies of 116 countries)

• Board Member, International Accounting Standards Committee (IASC), U.K (2000) (presently known as International Accounting Standards Board)

• Chairman: ICAI- Accounting Research Foundation (2001–02)

• Member, Advisory Board for Post-Graduate Diploma in Internal Audit and Management Control Systems by Department of Commerce, Delhi School of Economics, Delhi University (1988–1992)

== Books authored and Articles contributed ==
• First in India, book on "Indian Accounting Standards IFRS, US GAAP Comparison" published by LexisNexis Butterworths, U.K., authored in 2005.

• Authored Articles & Papers in Professional Journal "The Chartered Accountant":

– Future After Withdrawal of Sec. 10(20A)

– Transformation from Accounting to Management – Indian Perspective

– Governmental Accounting – A Re-examination

– Governmental Accounting Standards – Perspective

– Enterprise Governance & Risk Management

– Insurance – A Booming Professional Opportunity

– Networking

• Editor-in-Chief of the ICAI's journal, "The Chartered Accountant" (2001–2002).

Rajya Sabha
Preceded by Janardan Dwivedi	Member of Parliament in Rajya Sabha for Delhi; 28 January 2018 –	Incumbent
Aam Aadmi Party political offices
New political party	Ex-Officio Member of AAP ? – present	Incumbent
