= Mahendra Mohan =

Indian politician

Shri Mahendra Mohan a politician from Samajwadi Party is a Member of the Parliament of India representing Uttar Pradesh in the Rajya Sabha, the upper house of the Indian Parliament during 2006–2012.
