= List of Rajya Sabha members from Delhi =

The list of current and past Rajya Sabha members from the Delhi State. State elect 3 member for the term of 6 years and indirectly elected by the state legislators, since year 1956.

== Current members ==
| # | Name | Party | Term start | Term end |
|---|---|---|---|---|
| 1 | Sanjay Singh | AAP | 28-Jan-2024 | 27-Jan-2030 |
| 2 | Narain Dass Gupta | AAP | 28-Jan-2024 | 27-Jan-2030 |
| 3 | Swati Maliwal | BJP | 28-Jan-2024 | 27-Jan-2030 |

== Chronological list of all Rajya Sabha members from Delhi ==
Chronological list by last date of appointment

- Star (*) represents current Rajya Sabha members from DL State.

| Name | Party | Term start | Term end | Term | Notes |
|---|---|---|---|---|---|
| Swati Maliwal | BJP | 28-Jan-2024 | 27-Jan-2030 | 1 | * |
| N. D. Gupta | AAP | 28-Jan-2024 | 27-Jan-2030 | 2 | * |
| Sanjay Singh | AAP | 28-Jan-2024 | 27-Jan-2030 | 2 | * |
| Sanjay Singh | AAP | 28-Jan-2018 | 27-Jan-2024 | 1 | |
| N. D. Gupta | AAP | 28-Jan-2018 | 27-Jan-2024 | 1 | |
| Sushil Gupta | AAP | 28-Jan-2018 | 27-Jan-2024 | 1 | |
| Janardan Dwivedi | INC | 28-Jan-2012 | 27-Jan-2018 | 3 | |
| Parvez Hashmi | INC | 28-Jan-2012 | 27-Jan-2018 | 2 | |
| Karan Singh | INC | 28-Jan-2012 | 27-Jan-2018 | 3 | |
| Parvez Hashmi | INC | 04-Aug-2009 | 27-Jan-2012 | 1 | bye - res of Jai Parkash Aggarwal |
| Jai Parkash Aggarwal | INC | 28-Jan-2006 | 27-Jan-2012 | 1 | elected to North East Delhi LS on 16-May-2009 |
| Janardan Dwivedi | INC | 28-Jan-2006 | 27-Jan-2012 | 2 | |
| Karan Singh | INC | 28-Jan-2006 | 27-Jan-2012 | 2 | |
| Janardan Dwivedi | INC | 10-Aug-2004 | 27-Jan-2006 | 1 | bye - res of Ambika Soni |
| P. M. Sayeed | INC | 10-Aug-2004 | 27-Jan-2006 | 1 | bye - res of Akhlaqur Rahman Kidwai expired on 18-Nov-2005 |
| Akhlaqur Rahman Kidwai | INC | 28-Jan-2000 | 27-Jan-2006 | 1 | appointed as Governor of Haryana on 07-Jul-2004 |
| Karan Singh | INC | 28-Jan-2000 | 27-Jan-2006 | 1 | |
| Ambika Soni | INC | 28-Jan-2000 | 27-Jan-2006 | 1 | elected to Punjab RS on 05-Jul-2004 |
| Om Prakash Kohli | BJP | 28-Jan-1994 | 27-Jan-2000 | 1 | |
| K. R. Malkani | BJP | 28-Jan-1994 | 27-Jan-2000 | 1 | |
| Vijay Kumar Malhotra | BJP | 28-Jan-1994 | 27-Jan-2000 | 1 | elected to South Delhi LS on 06-Oct-1999 |
| Vishwa Bandhu Gupta | INC | 03-Apr-1984 | 02-Apr-1990 | 1 | |
| Laxmi Narain | INC | 21-Nov-1983 | 20-Nov-1989 | 1 | |
| Shamim Ahmed Siddiqui | INC | 21-Nov-1983 | 20-Nov-1989 | 1 | |
| Jagannathrao Joshi | BJP | 03-Apr-1978 | 02-Apr-1984 | 1 | |
| Charanjit Chanana | INC | 03-Apr-1976 | 02-Apr-1982 | 1 | |
| Khurshed Alam Khan | INC | 16-Apr-1974 | 15-Apr-1980 | 1 | |
| Savita Behen | INC | 03-Apr-1972 | 02-Apr-1978 | 1 | |
| L. K. Advani | ABJS | 03-Apr-1970 | 02-Apr-1976 | 1 | |
| Bhai Mahavir | ABJS | 16-Apr-1968 | 15-Apr-1974 | 1 | |
| Shanta Vasisht | INC(O) | 03-Apr-1966 | 02-Apr-1972 | 2 | |
| Sardar Santokh Singh | INC | 16-Apr-1962 | 15-Apr-1968 | 1 | |
| Shanta Vasisht | INC | 03-Apr-1960 | 02-Apr-1966 | 1 | |
| Ahmed Ali Mirza | IND | 17-Sep-1958 | 02-Apr-1964 | 1 | bye - death of Begum Siddiqa Kidwai |
| Begum Siddiqa Kidwai | INC | 03-Apr-1958 | 02-Apr-1964 | 2 | expired on 03-Jun-1958 |
| S. K. Dey | INC | 31-Jan-1957 | 01-Mar-1962 | 1 | elected to Nagaur LS |
| Begum Siddiqa Kidwai | INC | 24-Nov-1956 | 02-Apr-1958 | 1 | |
| Onkar Nath | INC | 24-Nov-1956 | 02-Apr-1960 | 2 | |
| Mehr Chand Khanna | INC | 13-May-1955 | 14-Dec-1956 | 1 | resigned on 14-Dec-1956 |
| Onkar Nath | INC | 03-Apr-1952 | 16-Apr-1955 | 1 | resigned on 16-Apr-1955 |
