= List of Rajya Sabha members from Sikkim =

The Rajya Sabha (meaning the "Council of States") is the upper house of the Parliament of India. Sikkim elects 1 seat and it is indirectly elected by the state legislators of Sikkim, since year 1976. The number of seats, allocated to the party, are determined by the number of seats, a party possesses during nomination and the party nominates a member to be voted on. Elections in within the state legislatures are held using Single transferable vote with proportional representation.

== List ==
List of Rajya Sabha members representing Sikkim
No.	Name	Party	Term start	Term End
1	Leonard Soloman Saring	Indian National Congress	20 October 1975	19 October 1981
1	Leonard Soloman Saring	Indian National Congress	20 October 1981	19 October 1987
2	Khamsum Namgyal Pulger	Sikkim Sangram Parishad	20 October 1987	1 March 1988 (Note: Resignation)
3	Karma Topden	Indian National Congress	30 March 1988 (Note: Bye-election)	19 October 1993
3	Karma Topden	Indian National Congress	24 February 1994	23 February 2000
4	K. G. Bhutia	Sikkim Democratic Front	24 February 2000	12 August 2000 (Note: Died in office)
5	Palden Tsering Gyamtso	Sikkim Democratic Front	22 September 2000	23 February 2006
6	O. T. Lepcha	Sikkim Democratic Front	24 February 2006	23 February 2012
7	Hishey Lachungpa	Sikkim Democratic Front	24 February 2012	23 February 2018
7	Hishey Lachungpa	Sikkim Democratic Front	24 February 2018	23 February 2024
8	Dorjee Tshering Lepcha *	Bharatiya Janata Party	24 February 2024	23 February 2030

* Indicates current member
