= Narayan Singh Kesari =

Indian politician

Narayan Singh Kesari (born 2 July 1936) is an Indian politician of the Bharatiya Janata Party and a member of the Parliament of India representing Madhya Pradesh in the Rajya Sabha, the upper house of the Parliament.
