= Shreegopal Vyas =

Indian politician (1932–2024)

Shreegopal Vyas (15 February 1932 – 7 November 2024) was an Indian politician of the Bharatiya Janata Party who was a member of the Parliament of India, representing Chhattisgarh in the Rajya Sabha, the upper house of the Parliament. He was an alumnus of the Jabalpur Engineering College. He retired from the Rajya Sabha on 13 February 2019. Shreegopal Vyas was Rajyasabha MP from Chhattisgarh state from 3 April 2006 to 2 April 2012. Vyas died on 7 November 2024, at the age of 92.
