= Balavant Apte =

Indian politician and lawyer

Bal Apte

Member of Rajya Sabha
- In office 3 April 2000 – 2 April 2012
- Constituency: Maharashtra

Personal details
- Born: Balavant Apte; 18 January 1939 Rajgurunagar, Pune district, Maharashtra
- Died: 17 July 2012 (aged 73) Mumbai, Maharashtra
- Party: Bharatiya Janata Party
- Spouse: Nirmala Apte
- Children: 1
- Education: Government Law College, Bombay University.
- Profession: Lawyer

Balavant Apte, also called Bal Apte and Balasaheb Apte (18 January 1939 – 17 July 2012) was a lawyer, politician of the Bharatiya Janata Party (BJP) and a member of the Parliament of India representing Maharashtra in the Rajya Sabha, the upper house of the Indian Parliament. He was a MA LLM. He died on 17 July 2012 at Hinduja Hospital in Mumbai.

== Career ==
Bal Apte was a Vice President of the BJP. He had been actively involved in the legal process of the Ram Janmabhoomi movement. He rose to fame after the BJP's defeat in the 2009 General elections, when he was appointed to frame a report on the reasons for the Party's loss. Called the "Bal Apte Report," it was a big critique of the functioning of the party and an indirect indictment of many of its top leaders.

Apte was a dedicated swayamsevak of the Rashtriya Swayamsevak Sangh and the National President of the Akhil Bharatiya Vidyarthi Parishad and was active in ABVP for 38 Years. He was an Additional Advocate General for the State of Maharashtra and a Senior Advocate of the Supreme Court of India.
