= Mahendra Prasad =

Indian politician (1940–2021)

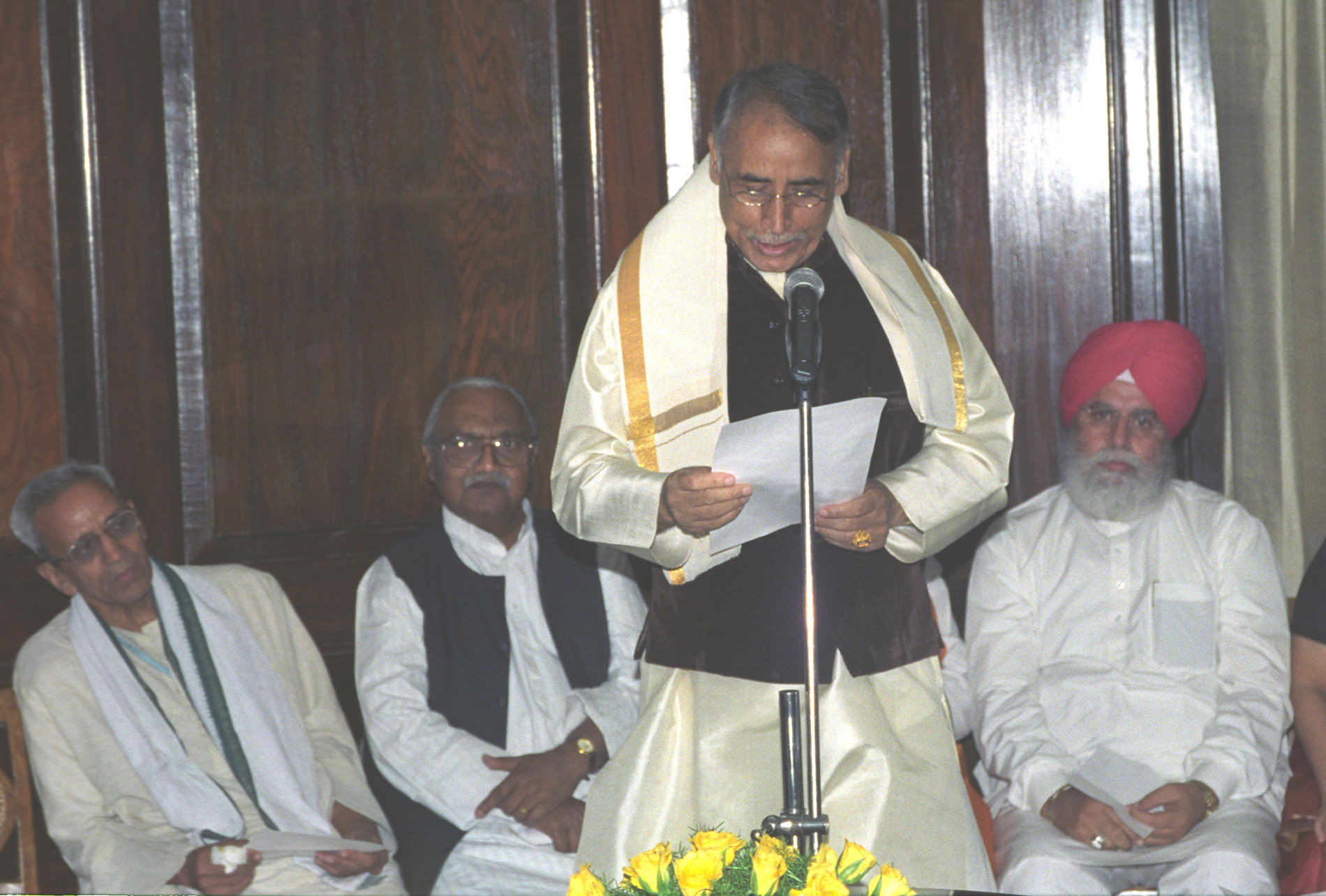
- Prasad in 2006

MP of Rajya Sabha
- In office May 1985 – December 2021
- Succeeded by: Anil Hegde
- Constituency: Bihar

Personal details
- Born: 8 January 1940 Govindpur, Jehanabad district, Bihar, British India
- Died: 27 December 2021 (aged 81) Delhi, India
- Party: Janata Dal (United)
- Education: Patna College

Mahendra Prasad (8 January 1940 – 27 December 2021) was an Indian politician from Janata Dal (United) party, a Member of the Parliament of India representing Bihar in the Rajya Sabha. He was the richest Indian MP. Prasad also owned two pharmaceutical companies, Aristo Pharmaceuticals and Mapra Laboratories Pvt Ltd. He died at Apollo Hospital in Delhi on 27 December 2021, at the age of 81.

== Personal life ==
Prasad was born at Govindpur village in the modern Indian state of Bihar. He belonged to Bhumihar family. He was married to Satula Devi and had 3 sons Rajiv Sharma, Ranjit Sharma and late Devinder.

== Career ==
Prasad moved out of his home at the age of 24. At young age he left for Bombay to start a business. He worked as a teacher in a school.He started working with pharma businessman Samprada Singh. He later went on to start his company Aristo Pharmaceuticals in 1971. He started his political career in 1980 when he was elected to Lok Sabha on a congress ticket. He was a seven term MP from Bihar who was also once elected to Lok Sabha. He also owned two pharmaceutical companies named Aristo Pharmaceuticals and Mapra Laboratories Pvt Ltd.

== Rajya Sabha Election History ==
Position	Party	Constituency	From	To	Tenure
Member of Parliament, Rajya Sabha (1st Term)	INC(I)	Bihar	31 January 1985	6 July 1986	1 year, 156 days
Member of Parliament, Rajya Sabha (2nd Term)	INC(I)	Bihar	7 July 1986	6 July 1992	5 years, 365 days
Member of Parliament, Rajya Sabha (3rd Term)	NOM	Nominated	27 August 1993	24 Nov 1994	1 year, 89 days
Member of Parliament, Rajya Sabha (4th Term)	IND	Bihar	3 April 2000	2 April 2006	5 years, 364 days
Member of Parliament, Rajya Sabha (5th Term)	JD(U)	Bihar	3 April 2006	2 April 2012	5 years, 365 days
Member of Parliament, Rajya Sabha (6th Term)	JD(U)	Bihar	3 April 2012	2 April 2018	5 years, 364 days
Member of Parliament, Rajya Sabha (7th Term)	JD(U)	Bihar	3 April 2018	27 Dec 2021	3 years, 268 days
