= Janardan Dwivedi =

Indian politician (born 1945)

Member of Parliament for Rajya Sabha
- In office 28 January 2004 – 27 January 2018
- Succeeded by: N. D. Gupta
- Constituency: NCT Delhi

General Secretary, All India Congress Committee
- In office 2004 – December 2017
- Succeeded by: Ashok Gehlot

Personal details
- Born: 5 September 1945 (age 81) Lodhawara, Chitrakoot, UP, India
- Party: Indian National Congress
- Children: 2 Sons & 1 daughter
- Education: University of Delhi; University of Allahabad

Janardan Dwivedi is an Indian politician and member of the Indian National Congress.

== Early life ==
Dwivedi was born in Lodhawara in the present-day Chitrakoot district, Uttar Pradesh.

== Political career ==
In May 2009 he took charge from Veerappa Moily as Manager of Media Department of Congress in addition to serving as the party General Secretary. He was the general secretary (Administration)of Congress Party.

He was on the four member committee that included Rahul Gandhi, A.K.Antony and Ahmed Patel to look after the party's affairs in Sonia Gandhi's absence.

=== Controversies ===
On 6 June 2011, during a press conference in Delhi he criticized Swami Ramdev and the Bharatiya Janata Party. Dwivedi had a unsuccessfully shoe thrown at him as an insult by Sunil Kumar, who claimed to be a journalist from Jhunjhunu in Rajasthan state.

=== Stand on reservation ===
On 4 February 2014, he urged congress vice-president Rahul Gandhi to reconsider the party's stand on caste based reservations in India. He said that caste based reservation should end and urged all the financially backward class to get the benefit irrespective of caste. However, congress party separated from Dwivedi's view saying that it was his personal view and not the party's. Congress president Sonia Gandhi later clarified the party's stand and said that Caste based reservations should continue for SCs, STs and OBCs.

== Election History ==
=== Rajya Sabha ===
Position	Party	Constituency	From	To	Tenure
Member of Parliament, Rajya Sabha (1st Term)	INC	Delhi	10 August 2004	27 January 2006	1 year, 170 days
Member of Parliament, Rajya Sabha (2nd Term)	INC	Delhi	28 January 2006	27 January 2012	5 years, 364 days
Member of Parliament, Rajya Sabha (3rd Term)	INC	Delhi	28 January 2012	27 January 2018	5 years, 364 days

Rajya Sabha
Preceded by ?	Member of Parliament in Rajya Sabha for Delhi; 28 January 2018 –	Succeeded by N. D. Gupta
Party political offices
Preceded by ?	General Secretary of All India Congress Committee; 2004–2017	Succeeded by Ashok Gehlot
