= Rae Bareli Lok Sabha constituency =

Lok Sabha constituency in Uttar Pradesh, India

Coordinates: 26.23°N 81.25°E

Rae Bareli UP-36
- Lok Sabha constituency
- Interactive Map Outlining Rae Bareli Lok Sabha constituency

Constituency details
- Country: India
- Region: North India
- State: Uttar Pradesh
- Assembly constituencies: Bachhrawan; Harchandpur; Rae Bareli; Sareni; Unchahar
- Established: 1952–present
- Reservation: None

Member of Parliament
- 18th Lok Sabha
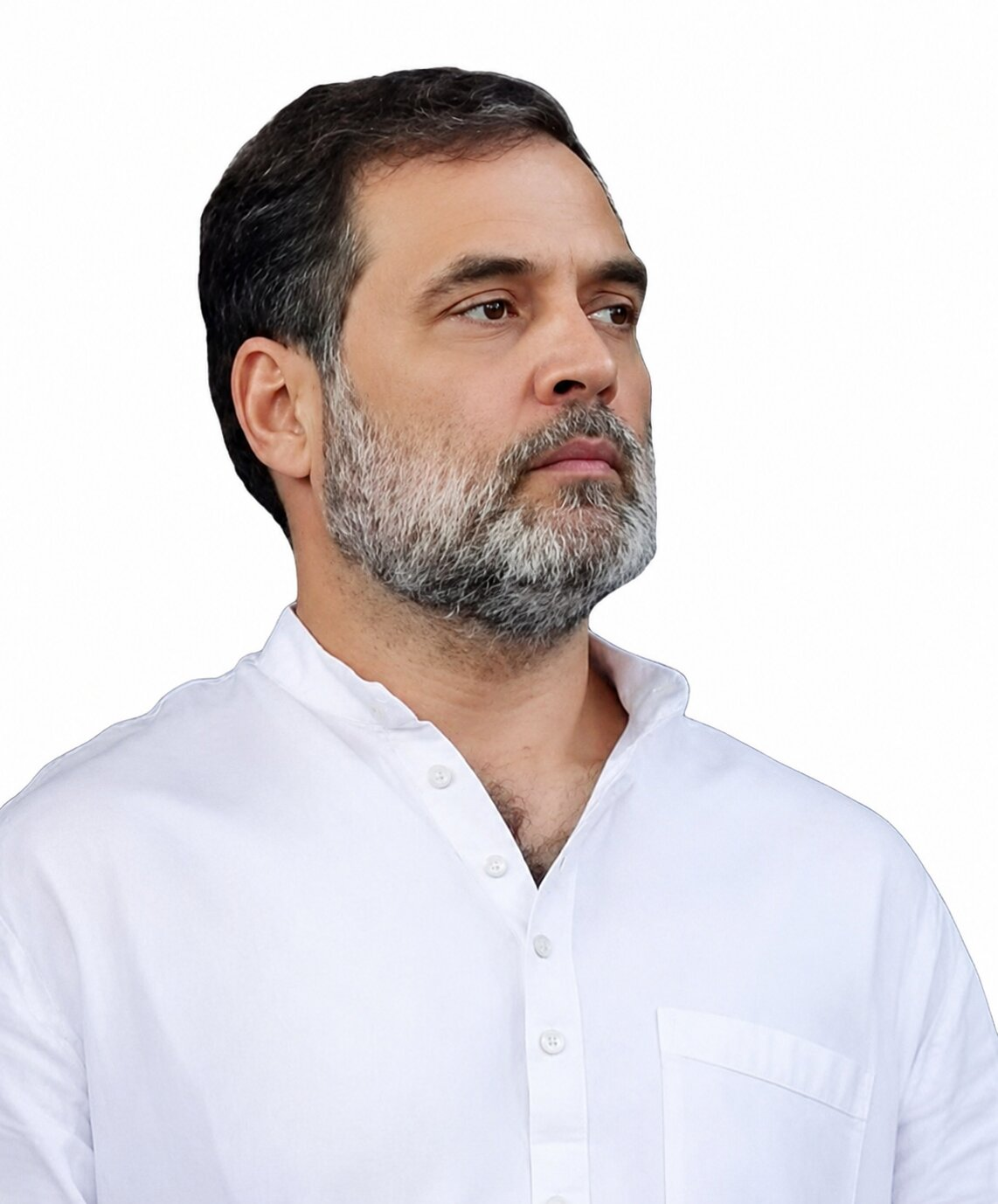
- Incumbent Rahul Gandhi; Leader of the Opposition in Lok Sabha
- Party: Indian National Congress
- Elected year: 2024
- Preceded by: Sonia Gandhi; Indian National Congress

Each election in the Rae Bareli Lok Sabha constituency has been won by a different political party (1952–2024)
1. INC (18 term) (85.7%)
2. BJP (2 term) (9.52%)
3. JP (1 term) (4.76%)

Rae Bareli is one of the 80 Lok Sabha (Parliamentary) constituencies in the northern Indian state of Uttar Pradesh. It is considered to be a bastion of the Indian National Congress. The first Member of Parliament was Baijnath Kureel. From 1967 to 1977, the seat was held by former Prime Minister Indira Gandhi, and from 2004 until her appointment to the Rajya Sabha in 2024, by Sonia Gandhi. It is currently represented by Rahul Gandhi, the Leader of the Opposition in Lok Sabha. The Indian National Congress is the most successful party in Rae Bareli, having won 17 out of 20 elections since 1952 (including three by-elections).

== Demographics and assembly segments ==
The constituency has an electorate of 9.59 lakhs in 2019 of which nearly 30% belongs to Scheduled Castes, 12% Muslims,12.5% Yadavs,Brahman 12%,Rajput 9%.

Presently, Rae Bareli comprises five Assembly (legislative assembly) segments. These are:

No	Name	District	Member	Party	2024 Lead
177	Bachhrawan (SC)	Raebareli	Shyam Sunder Bharti	SP	INC
179	Harchandpur	Raebareli	Rahul Lodhi Rajput	SP	INC
180	Rae Bareli	Raebareli	Aditi Singh	BJP	INC
182	Sareni	Raebareli	Devendra Pratap Singh	SP	INC
183	Unchahar	Raebareli	Manoj Kumar Pandey	BJP	INC

== Members of Lok Sabha ==
Year	Member	Party
1952	Feroze Gandhi	Indian National Congress
1957	Feroze Gandhi	Indian National Congress
1960^	R P Singh	Indian National Congress
1962	Baijnath Kureel	Indian National Congress
1967	Indira Gandhi	Indian National Congress
1971	Indira Gandhi	Indian National Congress
1977	Raj Narain	Janata Party
1980	Indira Gandhi	Indian National Congress
1980^	Arun Nehru	Indian National Congress
1984	Arun Nehru	Indian National Congress
1989	Sheila Kaul	Indian National Congress
1991	Sheila Kaul	Indian National Congress
1996	Ashok Singh	Bharatiya Janata Party
1998	Ashok Singh	Bharatiya Janata Party
1999	Satish Sharma	Indian National Congress
2004	Sonia Gandhi	Indian National Congress
2006^	Sonia Gandhi	Indian National Congress
2009	Sonia Gandhi	Indian National Congress
2014	Sonia Gandhi	Indian National Congress
2019	Sonia Gandhi	Indian National Congress
2024	Rahul Gandhi	Indian National Congress

^By-Poll

== Election results ==
Vote share of Winning candidates
2024	66.17%
2019	55.80%
2014	63.80%
2009	72.23%
2006 (By-Poll)	80.49%
2004	58.75%
1999	32.76%
1998	36.15%
1996	33.93%
1991	23.06%
1989	42.81%
1984	70.07%
1980 (By-Poll)	66.22%
1980	58.27%
1977	53.51%
1971	66.35%
1967	55.19%
1962	38.67%
1960 (By-Poll)	47.76%
1957	24.08%
1957	19.74%
1952	32.96%
1952	28.99%

=== 2024 ===
2024 Indian general election: Rae Bareli
Party	Candidate	Votes	%	±%
INC	Rahul Gandhi	687,649	66.17	▲10.37
BJP	Dinesh Pratap Singh	297,619	28.64	▼9.72
BSP	Thakur Prasad Yadav	21,624	2.08	
NOTA	None of the Above	7,872	0.76	▼0.31
IND	Horilal	5,399	0.52	
OTH	4 Other Party Candidates	19,056	1.83	
Majority		390,030	37.53	▲20.09
Turnout		1,036,997	58.04	▲1.70
INC hold		Swing		

=== 2019 ===
2019 Indian general election: Rae Bareli
Party	Candidate	Votes	%	±%
INC	Sonia Gandhi	534,918	55.80	▼8.00
BJP	Dinesh Pratap Singh	367,740	38.36	▲17.31
NOTA	None of the Above	10,252	1.07	▲0.41
IND	6 Independent Candidates	22,317	2.33	
OTH	7 Other Party Candidates	23,329	2.43	
Majority		167,178	17.44	▼25.31
Turnout		959,022	56.34	▲4.61
INC hold		Swing		

=== 2014 ===
2014 Indian general election: Rae Bareli
Party	Candidate	Votes	%	±%
INC	Sonia Gandhi	526,434	63.80	▼8.43
BJP	Ajay Agarwal	173,721	21.05	▲17.23
BSP	Pravesh Singh	63,633	7.71	▼8.69
AAP	Archana Srivastava	10,383	1.26	
NOTA	None of the Above	5,409	0.66	
AITC	Anju Singh	3,507	0.43	
IND	4 Independent Candidates	22,558	2.73	
OTH	8 Other Party Candidates	19,491	2.36	
Majority		352,713	42.75	▼13.08
Turnout		825,142	51.73	▲3.40
INC hold		Swing		

=== 2009 ===
2009 Indian general election: Rae Bareli
Party	Candidate	Votes	%	±%
INC	Sonia Gandhi	481,490	72.23	▼8.26
BSP	R. S. Kushwaha	109,325	16.40	
BJP	R. B. Singh	25,444	3.82	▲0.49
IND	11 Independent Candidates	36,027	5.40	
OTH	2 Other Party Candidates	14,362	2.15	
Majority		372,165	55.83	▼15.00
Turnout		666,648	48.33	▲5.03
INC hold		Swing		

=== 2006 by-election ===
The 2006 Rae Bareli by-election was necessitated after Congress President Sonia Gandhi resigned from the Lok Sabha amid the "office of profit" controversy. She re-contested the by-election on 8 May 2006 and was re-elected by a margin of over four lakh votes.

By-election, 2006: Rae Bareli
Party	Candidate	Votes	%	±%
INC	Sonia Gandhi	474,891	80.49	▲21.74
SP	Raj Kumar	57,003	9.66	▼10.28
BJP	Vinay Katiyar	19,657	3.33	▼1.53
RJP	Deepa	8,336	1.41	
IND	Sunder Lal	6,780	1.15	
Majority		4,17,888	70.83	▲32.02
Turnout		5,90,033	43.30	▼5.12
INC hold		Swing		

=== 2004 ===
2004 Indian general election: Rae Bareli
Party	Candidate	Votes	%	±%
INC	Sonia Gandhi	378,107	58.75	▲25.99
SP	Ashok Kumar Singh	128,342	19.94	▼2.07
BSP	Rajesh Yadav	57,543	8.94	▼11.19
BJP	Girish Narayan Panday	31,290	4.86	▼15.04
IND	Hori Lal	15,160	2.36	
IND	8 Independent Candidates	18,204	2.83	
OTH	3 Other Party Candidates	14,914	2.32	
Majority		249,765	38.81	▲28.06
Turnout		643,560	48.42	▼9.85
INC hold		Swing		

=== 1999 ===
1999 Indian general election: Rae Bareli
Party	Candidate	Votes	%	±%
INC	Captain Satish Sharma	224,202	32.76	▲25.20
SP	Gajadhar Singh	150,653	22.01	▼7.93
BSP	Anand Prakash Lodhi	137,775	20.13	▲0.27
BJP	Arun Kumar Nehru	136,217	19.90	▼16.25
IND	16 Independent Candidates	25,012	3.65	
OTH	3 Other Party Candidates	10,602	1.55	
Majority		73,549	10.75	▲4.54
Turnout		684,461	58.27	▲1.21
INC gain from BJP		Swing		

=== 1998 ===
1998 Indian general election: Rae Bareli
Party	Candidate	Votes	%	±%
BJP	Ashok Singh	237,204	36.15	▲2.22
SP	Surendra Bahadur Singh	196,482	29.94	
BSP	Ramesh Kumar Maurya	130,342	19.86	▼4.94
INC	Deepa Kaul	49,615	7.56	▲2.27
IND	Ram Kishore	18,787	2.86	
JD	Ram Harsh Verma	12,106	1.85	▼25.05
IND	6 Independent Candidates	4,851	0.74	
OTH	4 Other Party Candidates	6,760	1.03	
Majority		40,722	6.21	▼0.82
Turnout		668,083	57.06	▲15.68
BJP hold		Swing		

=== 1996 ===
1996 Indian general election: Rae Bareli
Party	Candidate	Votes	%	±%
BJP	Ashok Singh	163,390	33.93	▲13.23
JD	Ashok Singh	129,503	26.90	▲4.72
BSP	Babulal Lodhi	119,422	24.80	▲16.68
INC	Vikram Kaul	25,457	5.29	▼17.77
IND	30 Independent Candidates	24,213	5.04	
OTH	6 Other Party Candidates	5,670	1.17	
Majority		33,887	7.03	▲6.15
Turnout		481,482	41.38	▼7.37
BJP gain from INC		Swing		

=== 1991 ===
1991 Indian general election: Rae Bareli
Party	Candidate	Votes	%	±%
INC	Sheila Kaul	102,331	23.06	▼19.75
JD	Ashok Kumar Singh	98,414	22.18	▼2.49
BJP	Ram Shankar Varma	91,850	20.70	▲7.36
JP	Yashpal Kapoor	75,128	16.93	▲14.60
BSP	Sudarshan Ram	36,018	8.12	▲5.11
DDP	Udaipratap Singh	2,235	0.50	▼1.55
IND	18 Independent Candidates	37,815	8.51	
Majority		3,917	0.88	▼17.26
Turnout		469,015	48.75	▼2.59
INC hold		Swing		

=== 1989 ===
1989 Indian general election: Rae Bareli
Party	Candidate	Votes	%	±%
INC	Sheila Kaul	197,658	42.81	▼27.26
JD	Rajendra Pratap Singh	113,879	24.67	
BJP	Surendra Bahadur Singh	61,585	13.34	
IND	Kaka Jogindinder Singh	14,168	3.07	
BSP	Sudarshan Ram	13,892	3.01	
LKD(B)	Mahadev Prasad	10,762	2.33	
JP	Basudev Prasad	10,742	2.33	
DDP	Udai Pratap Singh	9,465	2.05	▲1.13
IND	14 Independent Candidates	29,528	6.39	
Majority		83,779	18.14	▼39.33
Turnout		492,021	51.34	▼8.29
INC hold		Swing		

=== 1984 ===
1984 Indian general election: Rae Bareli
Party	Candidate	Votes	%	±%
INC	Arun Kumar Nehru	314,028	70.07	▲3.85
LKD	Ambedkar Savita	56,475	12.60	
IND	Jagdish Narain Misra	51,413	11.47	
DDP	Nav Ratan Pd. Dixit	4,125	0.92	
IND	11 Independent Candidates	22,102	4.93	
Majority		257,553	57.47	▲17.21
Turnout		459,235	59.63	
INC hold		Swing		

=== 1980 by-election ===
This by-election was necessitated by the resignation of Prime Minister Indira Gandhi, who had contested and won the Lok Sabha elections from both Raebareli and Medak. She retained the Medak seat and resigned from the Raebareli seat, necessitating the by-election.

1980 Rae Bareli by-election
Party	Candidate	Votes	%	±%
INC(I)	Arun Nehru	176,456	66.22	▲7.95
JP(S)	Janeshwar Mishra	69,166	25.96	▲13.38
IND	K. B. Singh	4,175	1.57	
IND	R. Pratap	4,004	1.50	
IND	J. B. S. Sanyasi	2,521	0.95	
IND	S. Narain	2,115	0.79	
IND	B. P. Dixit	1,625	0.61	
IND	K. A. Khan	1,364	0.51	
IND	K. Pal	1,305	0.49	
IND	L. D. Pandey	970	0.36	
IND	M. L. Yadav	960	0.36	
IND	B. alias G. Prasad	945	0.35	
IND	M. B. Singh	859	0.32	
Majority		107,290	40.26	▼4.93
INC(I) hold		Swing		

=== 1980 ===
Indira Gandhi was also elected from Medak (Andhra Pradesh, present day Telangana). She retained her seat in Medak and resigned from Rae Bareli.

1980 Indian general election: Rae Bareli
Party	Candidate	Votes	%	±%
INC(I)	Indira Gandhi	223,903	58.27	▲21.38
JP	Vijayaraje Scindia	50,249	13.08	▼40.43
JP(S)	Mahipal Singh	48,353	12.58	
IND	23 Independent Candidates	61,744	16.09	
Majority		173,654	45.19	▲28.57
Turnout		396,214	56.68	▲2.52
INC(I) gain from JP		Swing		

=== 1977 ===
This time the incumbent Prime minister Indira Gandhi lost to her opponent, the only such instance to date.

1977 Indian general election: Rae Bareli
Party	Candidate	Votes	%	±%
JP	Raj Narain	177,719	53.51	
INC	Indira Gandhi	122,517	36.89	▼29.46
IND	P. Nallathampy Terah	9,311	2.80	
IND	Kamal Ahmad Khan	7,467	2.25	
IND	Krishna Prasad	4,083	1.23	
IND	Nagarmal Bajoriya	2,980	0.90	
IND	Siya Ram Shukla	2,839	0.85	
IND	Hari Prasad Sharma	2,703	0.81	
IND	Thakur Prasad	2,503	0.75	
Majority		55,202	16.62	▼23.85
Turnout		342,742	54.16	▼1.06
JP gain from INC		Swing		

=== 1971 ===
Indira Gandhi's election was annulled by the Allahabad High Court in June 1975 on a technicality, but the Supreme Court of India overturned the decision following an amendment to the constitution.

1971 Indian general election: Rae Bareli
Party	Candidate	Votes	%	±%
INC	Indira Gandhi	183,309	66.35	▲11.16
SSP	Raj Narain	71,499	25.88	
IND	Swami Adwaita Nand	16,627	6.02	
RSM	Rameshwar Dutta Manav	4,839	1.75	
Majority		111,810	40.47	▲5.23
Turnout		284,752	55.22	▼1.64
INC hold		Swing		

=== 1967 ===
1967 Indian general election: Rae Bareli
Party	Candidate	Votes	%	±%
INC	Indira Gandhi	143,602	55.19	▲16.52
IND	B. C. Seth	51,899	19.95	
IND	R. N. Anarya	20,522	7.89	
IND	G. Gurbax	14,220	5.46	
CPI	J. Kishore	13,297	5.11	
IND	C. K. C. T. Chand	7,707	2.96	
IND	H. Swarup	4,997	1.92	
IND	S. D. Singh	3,959	1.52	
Majority		91,703	35.24	▲28.12
Turnout		272,736	56.86	▲7.86
INC hold		Swing		

=== 1962 ===
1962 Indian general election: Rae Bareli (SC)
Party	Candidate	Votes	%	±%
INC	Baijnath Kureel	77,435	38.67	▼9.09
ABJS	Taravati	63,167	31.55	▲2.93
Socialist	Deotadin	59,641	29.78	▲16.11
Majority		14,268	7.12	▼12.03
Turnout		206,809	49.00	
INC hold		Swing		

=== 1960 by-election ===
1960 Rae Bareli by-election
Party	Candidate	Votes	%	±%
INC	R. P. Singh	104,840	47.76	
ABJS	N. B. Singh	62,809	28.62	
Socialist	N. Kishore	30,006	13.67	
IND	Madan Mohan	14,582	6.64	
CPI	Ram Narain	7,253	3.30	
Majority		42,031	19.15	
INC hold		Swing		

=== 1957 ===
1957 Indian general election: Rae Bareli (2 seats)
Party	Candidate	Votes	%	±%
INC	Feroze Gandhi	162,595	24.08	
IND	Nand Kishore	133,342	19.74	
INC	Baij Nath Kureel	126,318	18.70	
ABJS	Chhote Lal	100,651	14.90	
PSP	Raguvendra Datt	94,109	13.93	
IND	Guru Dayal Das	58,342	8.64	
Majority		29,253	4.34	
Turnout		675,357	41.98	

=== 1952 ===
1952 Indian general election: Pratapgarh Distt (West) cum Rae Bareli Distt (East) (2 seats)
Party	Candidate	Votes	%	±%
INC	Feroze Gandhi	158,569	32.96	
INC	Baij Nath Kureel	139,485	28.99	
Socialist	Nand Ram Gupta	44,791	9.31	
ABJS	Ramesh Kumar	42,438	8.82	
RRP	Jamuna Prasad	39,273	8.16	
IND	Fateh Bahadur Singh	29,103	6.05	
Socialist	Guru Dayal Das	27,472	5.71	
Majority		19,084	3.97	
Turnout		481,131	34.53	

== See also ==
- Amethi Lok Sabha constituency
- Raebareli district
- List of constituencies of the Lok Sabha

== Notes ==
Lok Sabha
Vacant since 1966 (Prime Minister in Rajya Sabha) Title last held by Sabarkantha	Constituency represented by the prime minister 1967–1977	Succeeded by Surat
Vacant since 2014; No Official opposition Title last held by Vidisha	Constituency represented by the leader of the opposition 2024 – present	Incumbent
