= R. P. Singh (Raebareli politician) =

Indian politician

Member of Parliament, Lok Sabha
- In office December 1960 – March 1962
- Preceded by: Feroze Gandhi
- Succeeded by: Baijnath Kureel
- Constituency: Rae Bareli

Personal details
- Party: Indian National Congress

Rajendra Pratap Singh, commonly referred to as R. P. Singh, was an Indian politician affiliated with the Indian National Congress. He represented the Rae Bareli Lok Sabha constituency in Uttar Pradesh in the 2nd Lok Sabha, having been elected in a by-election in 1960 following the death of the sitting member, Feroze Gandhi.

== Political career ==
Following the death of Feroze Gandhi in September 1960, a by-election was held in the Rae Bareli Lok Sabha constituency to fill the vacant seat. The Indian National Congress fielded Rajendra Pratap Singh as its candidate. He won the election, retaining the constituency for the party. Singh secured 104,840 votes, defeating his nearest rival, N. B. Singh, who contested on behalf of the Bharatiya Jana Sangh and received 62,809 votes. Singh won by a margin of 42,031 votes.

=== Electoral performance ===
1960 Lok Sabha by-election: Rae Bareli
Party	Candidate	Votes	%
INC	R. P. Singh	104,840	47.76
ABJS	N. B. Singh	62,809	28.62
Majority		42,031	19.15
