= Satish Sharma =

Indian politician (1947–2021)

Minister of Petroleum and Natural Gas
- In office 1993–1996

Member of Parliament, Rajya Sabha
- In office 5 July 2010 – 4 July 2016
- Constituency: Uttar Pradesh
- In office 5 July 2004 – 4 July 2010
- Preceded by: Sangh Priya Gautam
- Succeeded by: Tarun Vijay
- Constituency: Uttarakhand

Member of Parliament, Lok Sabha
- In office 5 March 1998 – 15 May 2004
- Preceded by: Ashok Singh
- Succeeded by: Sonia Gandhi
- Constituency: Rae Bareli
- In office 19 June 1991 – 5 March 1998
- Preceded by: Rajiv Gandhi
- Succeeded by: Dr. Sanjay Singh
- Constituency: Amethi

Personal details
- Born: 11 October 1947 Secunderabad, Hyderabad State
- Died: 17 February 2021 (aged 73) Goa, India
- Party: Indian National Congress
- Spouse: Sterre Sharma
- Children: one son and one daughter

Satish C. Sharma (11 October 1947 – 17 February 2021) was an Indian politician. He represented the Indian National Congress, and was a former member of the Union Cabinet in the Government of India. Sharma's political career was boosted by his closeness to both Rajiv Gandhi, and after his assassination, his wife and the de facto political power center of the Congress party, Sonia Gandhi. He held seats in the Lok Sabha at the behest of both the Nehru - Gandhi family and the electorate.

== Personal life ==
Satish Sharma was born on 11 October 1947 in Secunderabad, a city in the Indian state Telangana. He was educated in Col. Brown Cambridge School in Dehra Dun and was later trained as a pilot in Kansas City, Missouri. He was married to Sterre Sharma who founded and runs the Tribal jewellery museum at Mangar Bani on the Delhi - Haryana which is a sacred grove in Faridabad district. He died on 17 February 2021 in Goa.

== Political career ==
He was first elected as a Rajya Sabha MP in 1986 from Madhya Pradesh. In 1991 he was elected to the Lok Sabha in a by-poll from Rajiv Gandhi's constituency of Amethi following the latter's assassination. From January 1993 until December 1996 he was Minister of Petroleum and Natural Gas. He was elected to Lok Sabha from Amethi again in 1996, and after losing in Amethi in 1998, he was elected again to Lok Sabha from Raebareli in 1999. From 2004 to 2016, he served as a Rajya Sabha MP from Uttarakhand and Uttar Pradesh.

In October 2021, Sharma was named in the Pandora Papers. These documents showed that Sharma owned property and had control of multiple international trusts, starting in 1995, which were not declared to the Election Commission of India. According to Sharma's wife Sterre Sharma, her husband had no offshore accounts, and the property was liquidated to pay taxes.

== Parliamentary Committees ==
- Member, Committee on Transport and Tourism (1999 – 2000)
- Member, Consultative Committee for the Ministry of Civil Aviation (October 2004 – May 2009 and August 2009 – July 2010)
- Member, Committee on Transport, Tourism and Culture (August 2009 – May 2014)
- Member, Committee on Urban Development (September 2014 – 2021)
