= Pradeep Gadge =

Indian Diabetologist

- Known for: Diabetologist
- Medical career
- Profession: Medical Doctor
- Sub-specialties: Diabetology
- Website: www.drpradeepgadge.com

Pradeep Gadge is an Indian Diabetologist known for managing complicated diabetic cases.

== Education ==
Pradeep Gadge is a graduate of Maharashtra University of Health Sciences. He holds an MD in Medicine, DPH, Diploma in Diabetology, and F.R.S.H (London).

== Medical career ==
Pradeep Gadge specializes in Diabetology and is known for treating diabetic patients and taking initiatives to educate people about diabetes care. He serves as a Clinical Investigator on several clinical endeavours. He also serves in the teaching faculty for postgraduate Diabetology students at the College of Physicians & Surgeons of Mumbai.

Pradeep has worked as a Visiting Diabetologist at Seven Hills Hospital, Mumbai and Breach Candy Hospital, Mumbai.

Pradeep has worked as a Clinical Associate-ICU at S L Raheja Hospital Mumbai & All India Institute of Diabetes Mahim, Mumbai . He has also served at Lilavati Hospital & Research Centre in the Department of Endocrinology / Diabetology. Gadge writes articles on diabetes which are regularly published in various textbooks. He is a certified speaker for the American Diabetes Association (ADA).

Pradeep is regularly quoted in various medical write-ups published by reputed newspapers such as The Times of India, DNA, Hindustan Times, Business Standard, Mumbai Mirror, The Economic Times,

== See also ==
- Diabetes mellitus
- Diabetes mellitus type 1
- Diabetes mellitus type 2
