= Electoral history of Rahul Gandhi =

Elections featuring Indian politician

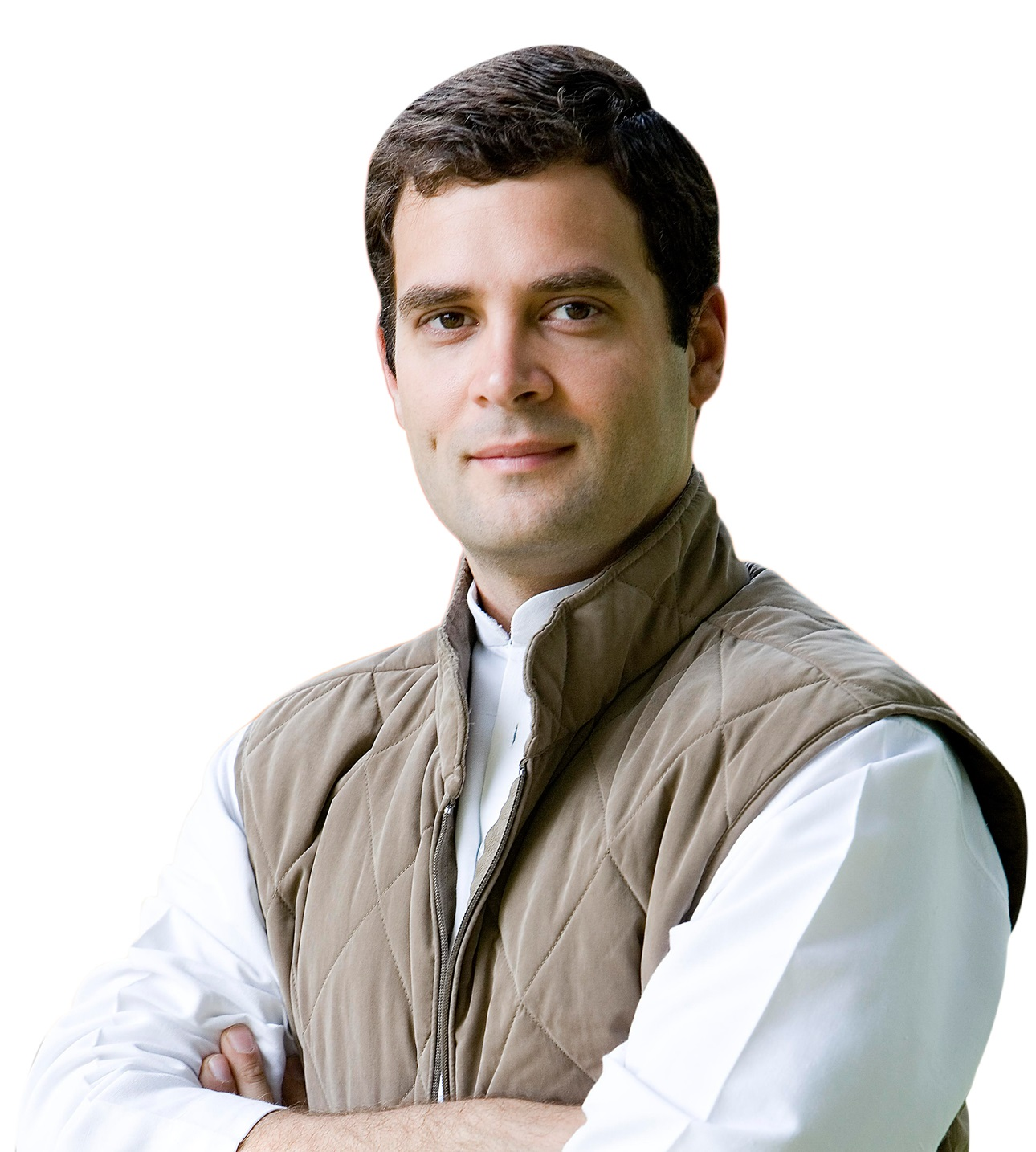
Rahul Gandhi in 2008

This is a summary of the electoral history of Rahul Gandhi, who is currently serving as the 12th leader of the Opposition in Lok Sabha and as the member of the Lok Sabha for Rae Bareli, Uttar Pradesh, since June 2024.

In the 2004 general election, Gandhi contested from Amethi and won, securing 390,179 votes with a vote share of 66.18 per cent. He contested again in the 2009 general election from Amethi, winning with 464,195 votes and a vote share of 71.78 per cent. In the 2014, 2014 general election, he retained his seat in Amethi, winning with 408,651 votes and a vote share of 46.71 per cent. In the 2019 Indian general election, he lost from Amethi, securing 413,394 votes with a vote share of 43.86 per cent. He won from Wayanad in the same election, garnering 706,367 votes with a vote share of 64.67 per cent. In the 2024 general election, Gandhi contested from Wayanad and Rae Bareli and won both garnering 364,422 votes with a vote share of 59.69 per cent and 390,030 votes with a vote share of 66.17 per cent respectively. Top leadership of Congress decided that Gandhi will retain Rae Bareli in the 18th Lok Sabha and Priyanka Gandhi was announced as the Congress candidate for Wayanad bypoll.

== Summary ==
=== Lok Sabha elections ===
Year	Constituency	Party	Votes	%	Result
2004	Amethi	INC	390,179	66.18%	Won
2009	Amethi	INC	464,195	71.78%	Won
2014	Amethi	INC	408,651	46.71%	Won
2019	Wayanad	INC	706,367	64.67%	Won
2019	Amethi	INC	413,394	43.86%	Lost
2024	Wayanad	INC	647,445	59.69%	Won
2024	Rae Bareli	INC	687,649	66.17%	Won

== Detailed results ==
=== General election 2004 ===
Rahul Gandhi, Sonia Gandhi's son, won the seat and represented the constituency in the Fourteenth Lok Sabha.

2004 Indian general election: Amethi
Party	Candidate	Votes	%	±%
INC	Rahul Gandhi	390,179	66.18	
BSP	Chandra Parkash Mishra	99,326	16.85	
BJP	Ram Vilas Vedanti	55,438	9.40	
Independent	Sri Ram	12,320	2.09	
AD(K)	Udai Raj Maurya	11,280	1.91	
Margin of victory		290,853	49.33	
Turnout		589,596	44.50	
INC hold		Swing		

=== General election 2009 ===
Rahul Gandhi held the seat and represented the constituency in the Fifteenth Lok Sabha.

2009 Indian general election: Amethi
Party	Candidate	Votes	%	±%
INC	Rahul Gandhi	464,195	71.78	
BSP	Asheesh Shukla	93,997	14.54	
BJP	Pradeep Kumar Singh	37,570	5.81	
JPS	Bhuwal	10,396	1.61	
Independent	Swami Nath	9,642	1.49	
Margin of victory		370,198	57.24	
Turnout		646,650	45.16	
INC hold		Swing		

=== General election 2014 ===
Rahul Gandhi won a third term as MP in the Sixteenth Lok Sabha.

2014 Indian general election: Amethi
Party	Candidate	Votes	%	±%
INC	Rahul Gandhi	408,651	46.71	▼25.07
BJP	Smriti Irani	300,748	34.38	▲28.57
BSP	Dharmendra Pratap Singh	57,716	6.60	▼7.94
AAP	Dr. Kumar Vishvas	25,527	2.92	New
NOTA	None of the Above	1,784	0.20	N/A
Margin of victory		1,07,903	12.33	▼32.83
Turnout		8,74,872	52.39	▲7.22
INC hold		Swing	▼26.82	

=== General election 2019 ===
==== Wayanad ====
2019 Indian general election: Wayanad
Party	Candidate	Votes	%	±%
INC	Rahul Gandhi	706,367	64.94	▲23.73
CPI	P. P. Suneer	274,597	25.24	▼13.68
BDJS	Thushar Vellappally	78,816	7.25	N/A
SDPI	Babu Mani	5,426	0.50	▼1.07
Margin of victory		4,31,770	39.69	37.41
Turnout		10,87,783	80.37	6.77
Registered electors		13,59,679		8.82
INC hold		Swing	23.73	

==== Amethi ====
2019 Indian general election: Amethi
Party	Candidate	Votes	%	±%
BJP	Smriti Irani	468,514	49.71	▲15.33
INC	Rahul Gandhi	413,394	43.84	▼2.85
NOTA	None of the Above	3,940	0.42	▲0.22
Margin of victory		55,120	5.85	▼6.48
Turnout		9,42,956	54.08	+1.69
BJP gain from INC		Swing	▲3.00	

=== General election 2024 ===
==== Wayanad ====
2024 Indian general election: Wayanad
Party	Candidate	Votes	%	±%
INC	Rahul Gandhi	647,445	59.69	▼5.25
CPI	Annie Raja	2,83,023	26.09	▲0.85
BJP	K. Surendran	1,41,045	13.00	▲6.75
NOTA	None of the above	6,999	0.65	
Majority		3,64,422	33.59	▼7.09
Turnout		10,86,459	74.19	
INC hold		Swing	▼5.25	

Percentage change (±) denotes the change in the number of votes from the immediate previous election.

==== Rae Bareli ====
2024 Indian general election: Rae Bareli
Party	Candidate	Votes	%	±%
INC	Rahul Gandhi	687,649	66.17	▲10.37
BJP	Dinesh Pratap Singh	297,619	28.64	▼9.72
BSP	Thakur Prasad Yadav	21,624	2.08	▲2.08
NOTA	None of the above	7,872	0.76	▼0.31
Majority		390,030	37.61	▲20.17
Turnout		10,369,97	58.04	▲1.70
INC hold		Swing		

== See also ==
- Electoral history of the Indian National Congress
- Electoral history of Indira Gandhi
