= Amarpal Maurya =

Indian politician

MP of Rajya Sabha for Uttar Pradesh
- Incumbent
- Assumed office 2024
- Preceded by: Anil Agrawal

Personal details
- Party: Bharatiya Janata Party
- Website: https://amarpalmaurya.com/

Amarpal Maurya is an Indian politician. He is a Member of Parliament, representing Uttar Pradesh in the Rajya Sabha the upper house of India's Parliament as a member of the Bharatiya Janata Party.

Maurya served as State General Secretary of the organisation for the Bharatiya Janata Party and was fielded as a candidate from Unchahar Assembly constituency in 2022 Uttar Pradesh Legislative Assembly elections. In this election, he faced two times MLA from Samajwadi Party Manoj Kumar Pandey and was defeated by a margin of 3% votes.

Maurya is an original resident of Pratapgarh district of Uttar Pradesh, but, he is said to have influence over voters in both Pratapgarh and Raebareli district. In past, he has also worked for the Rashtriya Swayamsevak Sangh in Haryana. In a personal interview, Maurya said that he comes from a farming family, which used to grow vegetables and in his childhood, he used to go to market to sell the vegetables. In his student life, he entered into politics and contested his first legislative assembly election from Unchahar Assembly constituency. He secured more than 76,000 votes, which was far better than votes polled in favour of any of the BJP candidate from this constituency in past.

Maurya pitched for Lok Sabha candidature from Pratapgarh Lok Sabha constituency in 2019, but in the seat distribution, this constituency was given to BJP's ally Apna Dal and he was asked by party leadership to contest on the symbol of Apna Dal. However, Maurya refused to do so. In February 2024, he was sent to Rajya Sabha, the upper house of Indian parliament by the BJP.

After working for years as the member of Rashtriya Swayamsevak Sangh, Maurya also worked as the personal assistant of former Madhya Pradesh chief minister and veteran BJP leader Uma Bharti to rise in ranks within the BJP.
