= Electoral history of Indira Gandhi =

Elections featuring Prime Minister of India

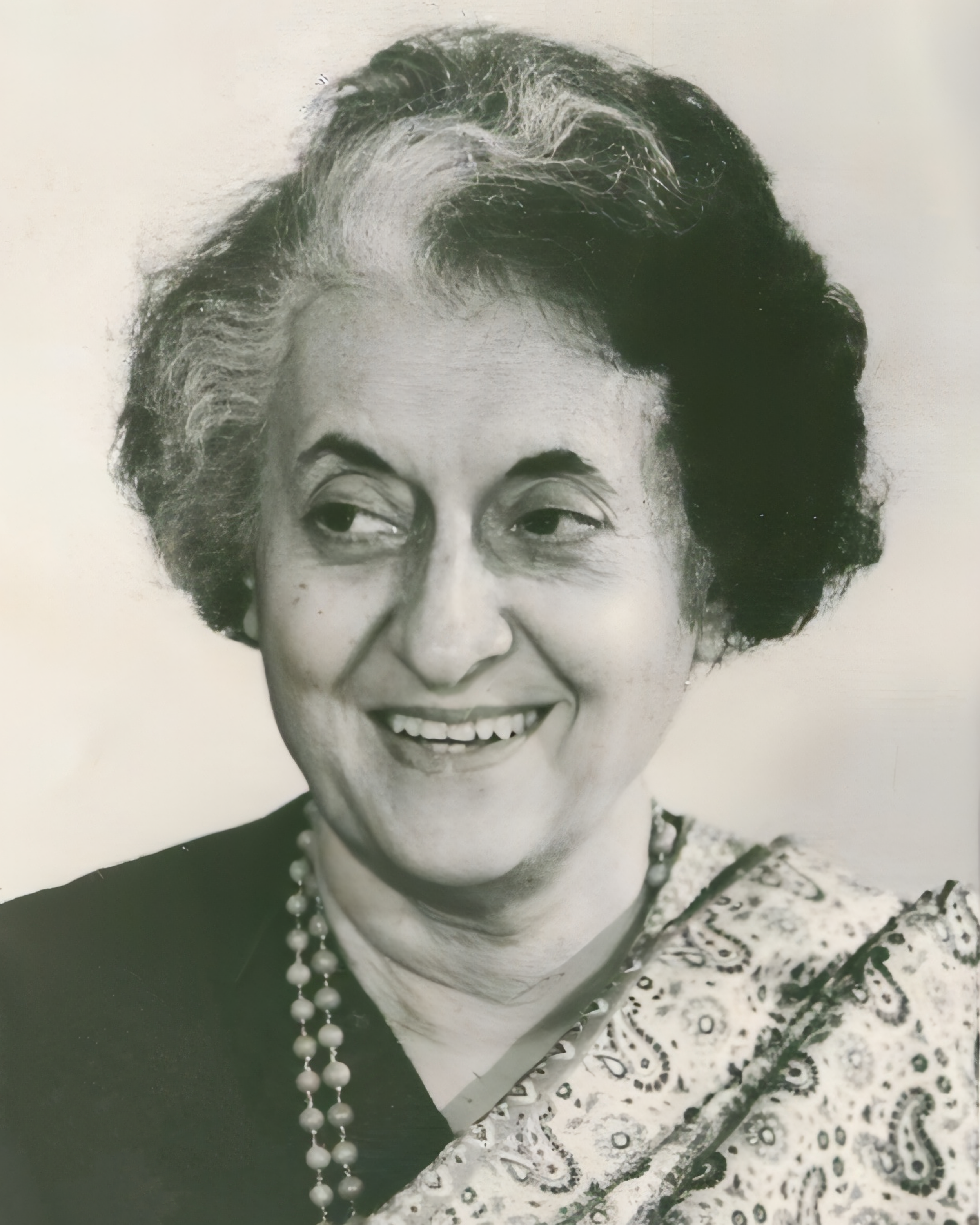
Indira Gandhi

This is a summary of the electoral history of Indira Gandhi, who served as the prime minister of India from January 1966 to March 1977, and again from January 1980 to October 1984.

== Detailed results ==
=== General Election 1971 ===
1971 Indian general election: Rae Bareli
Party	Candidate	Votes	%	±%
INC(R)	Indira Gandhi	183,309	66.35%	
SSP	Raj Narain	71,499	25.88%	
Independent	Swami Adwaita Nand	16,627	6.02%	
Revolutionary Socialist Party of India (Marxist–Leninist)	Rameshwar Dutta Manav	4,839	1.75%	
Majority		111,810	39.26%	
Turnout		284,752	55.22%	
Registered electors		515,711		
INC hold		Swing		

- Gandhi's election was annulled by the Allahabad High Court in June 1975 on a technicality, but the Supreme Court of India overturned the decision following an amendment to the constitution.

=== General Election 1977 ===
1977 Indian general election: Rae Bareli
Party	Candidate	Votes	%	±%
JP	Raj Narain	177,719	53.51	New
INC(R)	Indira Gandhi	122,517	36.89	▼29.46
Independent	P. Nallathampy Terah	9,311	2.80	
Independent	Kamal Ahamad Khan	7,467	2.25	
Independent	Krishna Prasad	4,083	1.23	
Majority		55,202	16.62	
Turnout		332,122	52.48	
JP gain from INC		Swing		

This time the incumbent Prime minister Indira Gandhi lost to her opponent, the only such instance to date.

=== 1978 by-election ===
1978 Lok Sabha by-election: Chikmagalur
Party	Candidate	Votes	%	±%
INC(I)	Indira Gandhi	249,376		
JP	Veerendra Patil	172,043		
Majority		77,333		
Turnout				
Registered electors				
INC hold		Swing		

=== General Election 1980 ===
Won from both Raebareli and Medak Lok Sabha constituencies. As per law, a candidate can represent only one constituency. Resigned from the Raebareli seat to retain the Medak seat.

1980 Indian general election: Medak
Party	Candidate	Votes	%	±%
INC(I)	Indira Gandhi	301,577	67.93%	
JP	S. Jaipal Reddy	82,453	18.57%	
JP(S)	Kesava Rao Jadav	26,149	5.89%	
Majority		219,124	49.36%	
Turnout		443,934	63.21%	
Registered electors		724,930		
INC hold		Swing		

1980 Indian general election: Rae Bareli
Party	Candidate	Votes	%	±%
INC(I)	Indira Gandhi	223,903	58.27%	
JP	Vijayaraje Scindia	50,249	12.58%	
JP(S)	Mahipal Singh	48,353	13.08%	
Majority		173,654	45.19%	
Turnout		384,249	56.68%	
Registered electors		699,064		
INC hold		Swing		

== See also ==
- Electoral history of the Indian National Congress
- Electoral history of Rahul Gandhi
