= Parsi Lying-in Hospital =

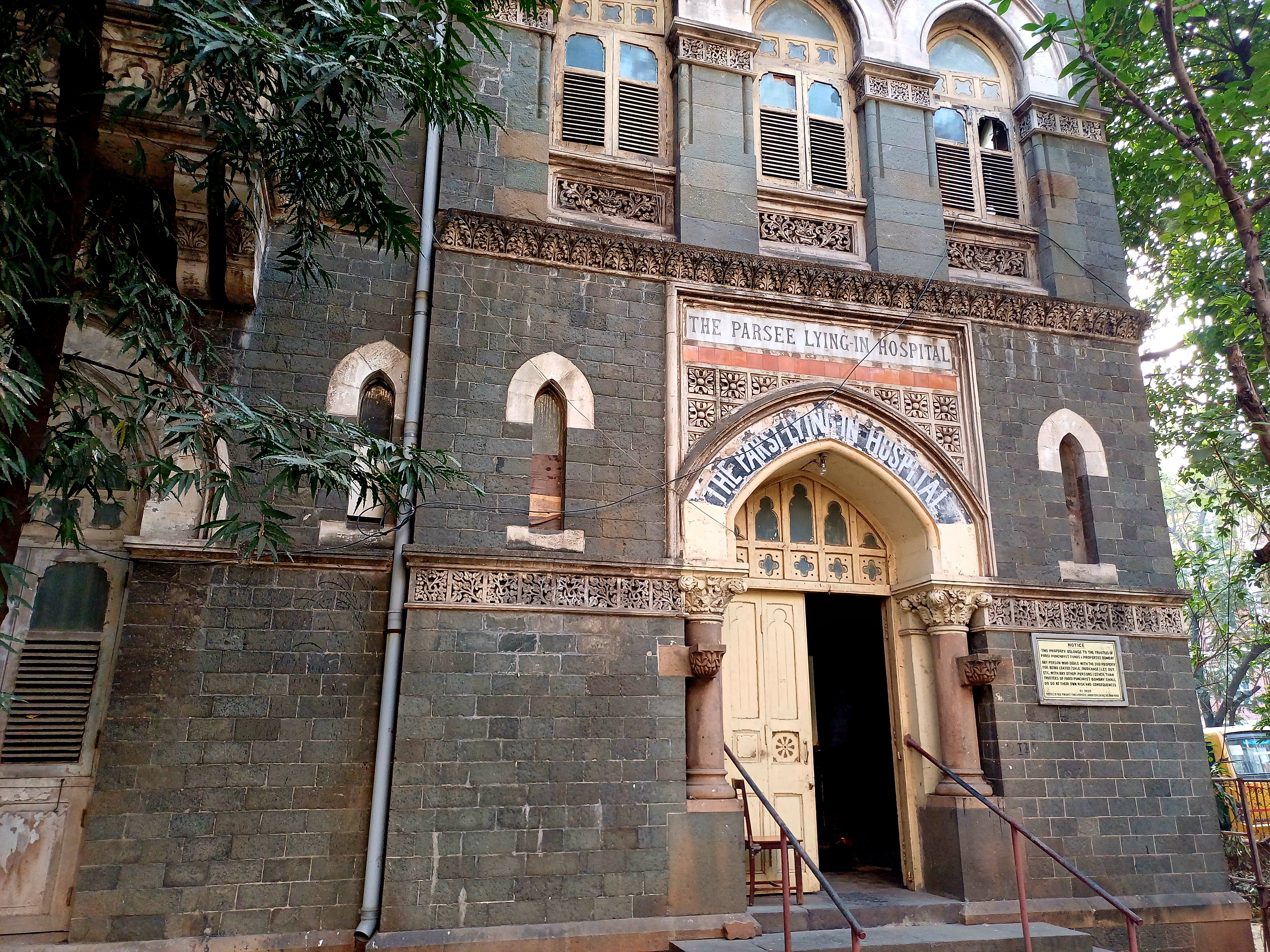

Geography
- Location: Mumbai, Maharashtra, India
- Coordinates: 18.935883°N 72.832588°E

Organisation
- Type: Specialist

Services
- Beds: 50 (as of 1895)
- Speciality: Maternity hospital

History
- Founded: 1887
- Closed: 1960s

Links
- Lists: Hospitals in India

The Parsi Lying-in Hospital (PLIH), also known as Temulji's Lying-in Hospital, sometimes spelled Tehmulji's Lying-in Hospital, was one of the first maternity hospitals in Bombay (now Mumbai). It was co-founded by physician and obstetrician Temulji Bhicaji Nariman in 1887 and completed in 1895. Dwindling numbers of Parsi births in the latter half of the 20th century led to its closure.

== Origins ==
During the 19th century, Bombay's Parsi women had largely given birth at home, confined to poorly ventilated and unsanitary conditions. In 1887, obstetrician and dean of Grant Medical College, Temulji Nariman, concerned about the prevalence of puerperal fever, founded the PLIH.

The hospital was initially located in a small house facing the ocean in the Marine Lines. It was run by Nariman as the Parsi Maternity Asylum and established Nariman's name in the community. Shortly, however, a plot was bought from the government on the esplanade in the Hornby Estate of Mumbai. The building was designed by Muncherji Murzban, a key figure in the Bombay Municipal Corporation who was inspired by the Peabody estates of London and who oversaw the construction of the building. It was completed in 1895 at a cost 105,000 rupees but by 1914, the total cost had increased to 130,541 rupees. Fakirjee Dinshaw served as the contractor. It was one of the city's first maternity hospitals built in the Gothic Revival style. Arranged around a courtyard, it could accommodate 50 women. It became popularly known as Temuljinu Suvarvakhana (Temulji’s lying-house).

== Early years ==
Previously, during their confinement, women had been located in the darkest and dampest corners of the house on the ground floor where sewage gases could contribute to ill-health. The PLIH, however, located women on upper floors with better hygiene and more space. The hospital acquired a reputation for cleanliness and the availability of midwives and clean linen. New mothers stayed for more than a month and it was felt by the Parsi community that it fulfilled an unmet need.

Temulji Nariman became symbolic of "Parsi motherhood". He was the hospital's honorary secretary and chief physician at the time of the opening ceremony on 11 January 1895, and he encouraged the wealthier Parsis to allow those poorer to make use of its placements. The fee structure had three tiers. The third class received free treatment, the second class paid 1.80 rupees per day and first class paid 3 rupees per day. A refundable deposit was also taken.

Within the first four years, about 1,750 patients had been treated and by the turn of the 20th century, Parsi women had three hospitals to choose from within the district of the Esplanade, the Bomanjee Edaljee Allbless Obstetric Hospital, the Pestanjee Hormusjee Cama Hospital for Women and Children and the PLIH.

Among notable Parsis born at the PLIH, were Feroze Gandhi in 1912. Jamsetji Tata was a committee member.

== Later years ==
In the early 21st century there were plans to convert the grade 2B listed building into an orthopaedic hospital, however, in 2015 the first floor was being used as offices and the remainder of the building was empty.
