= Feroze Gandhi College =

College in Raebareli, Uttar Pradesh, India

Feroze Gandhi College, Raebareli
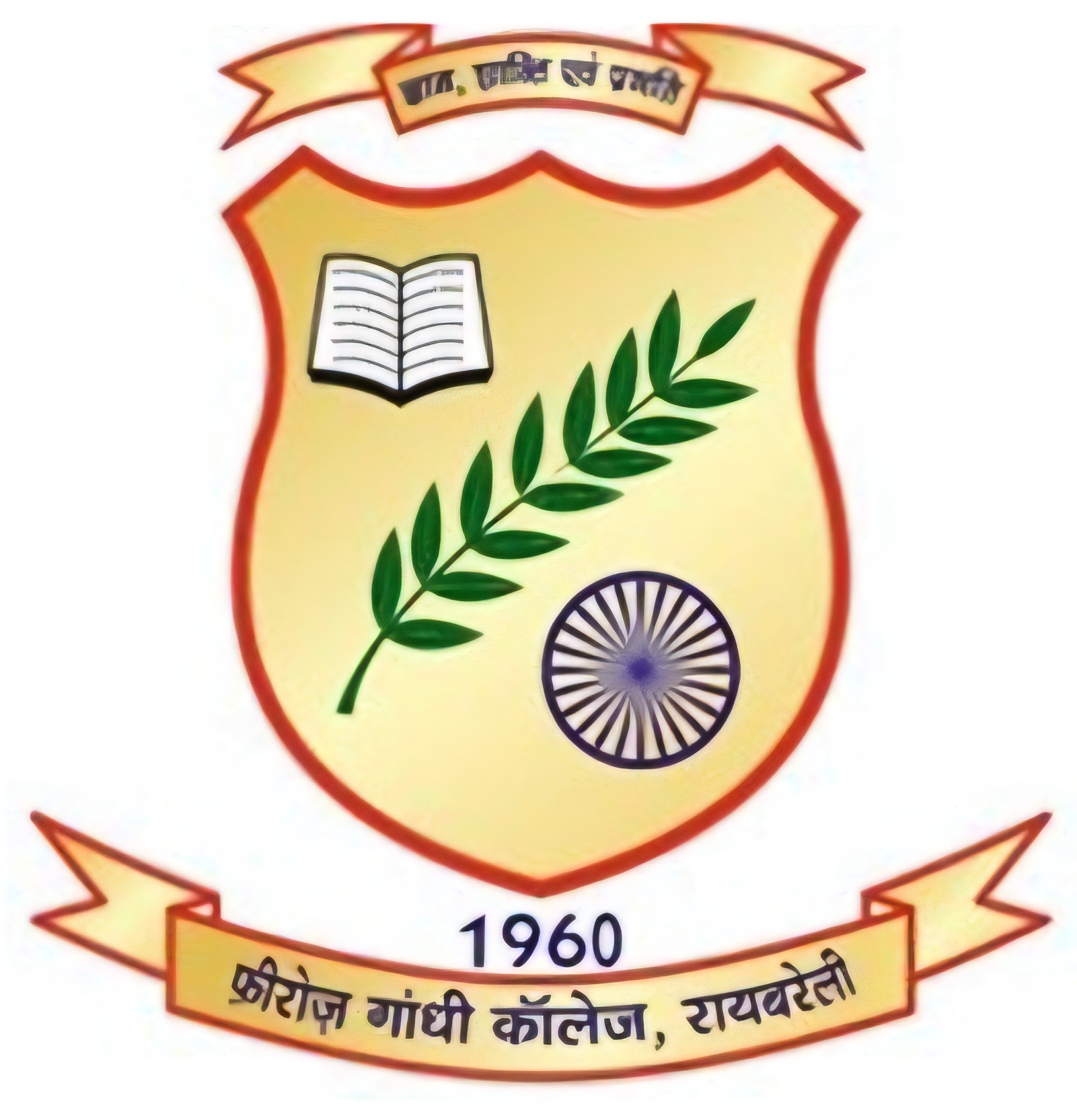
- Former name: Raebareli College
- Type: Government Aided College
- Established: 8 August 1960
- Founder: Feroze Gandhi
- Academic affiliations: University of Lucknow (2020-present); Chhatrapati Shahu Ji Maharaj University (erstwhile Kanpur University) (1968-2020); Agra University (1960-1968)
- Principal: Prof. Manoj Kumar Tripathi
- Location: Raebareli, Uttar Pradesh, India; 26.2166677°N 81.2441459°E
- Campus: Urban
- Website: fgc.edu.in

Feroze Gandhi College, is a college in Raebareli, Uttar Pradesh, established on 8 August 1960 by then local Member of Parliament Feroze Gandhi. It is associated with University of Lucknow.

== About ==
Feroze Gandhi College is the main center for higher education in the Raebareli district. The college was established on 8 August 1960 by the then Member of Parliament Sri Feroze Gandhi. At present the college is providing education in four faculties namely "Science, Arts, Commerce & Education". There is also a proposal to declare it “A Deemed University”.

== Notable alumni ==
- Dinesh Pratap Singh, MLC & Minister of State, Uttar Pradesh Government
- Manoj Kumar Pandey, MLA
- Akhilesh Kumar Singh, former MLA
- Ram Singh Patel, former MLA

== See also ==
- Feroze Gandhi
- Rajiv Gandhi National Aviation University
