= Sareni Assembly constituency =

Assembly constituency in Uttar Pradesh

Sareni
- Constituency No. 182 for the Uttar Pradesh Legislative Assembly

Constituency details
- Country: India
- Region: North India
- State: Uttar Pradesh
- District: Rae Bareli
- Lok Sabha constituency: Amethi
- Total electors: 3,71,469
- Reservation: None

Member of Legislative Assembly
- 18th Uttar Pradesh Legislative Assembly
- Incumbent Devendra Pratap Singh
- Party: Samajwadi Party
- Elected year: 2022

Sareni is a constituency of the Uttar Pradesh Legislative Assembly covering the city of Sareni in the Rae Bareli district of Uttar Pradesh, India.

Sareni is one of five assembly constituencies in the Rae Bareli Lok Sabha constituency. Since 2008, this assembly constituency is numbered 182 amongst 403 constituencies.

== Members of the Legislative Assembly ==
Election	Name	Party
1996	Ashok Kumar Singh	Samajwadi Party
2002	Devendra Pratap Singh	Samajwadi Party
2007	Ashok Kumar Singh	Indian National Congress
2012	Devendra Pratap Singh	Samajwadi Party
2017	Dhirendra Bahadur Singh	Bharatiya Janata Party
2022	Devendra Pratap Singh	Samajwadi Party

== Election results ==
=== 2027 ===
2027 Uttar Pradesh Legislative Assembly election: Sareni
Party	Candidate	Votes	%	±%
INDIA				
NDA				
BSP				
NOTA	None of the above			
Majority				
Turnout				
gain from		Swing		

=== 2022 ===
2022 Uttar Pradesh Legislative Assembly election: Sareni
Party	Candidate	Votes	%	±%
SP	Devendra Pratap Singh	66,166	30.53	+14.52
BJP	Dhirendra Bahadur Singh	62,359	28.78	−3.38
INC	Sudha Dwivedi	42,702	19.71	−0.91
BSP	Thakur Prasad Yadav	38,155	17.61	−8.2
NOTA	None of the above	1,395	0.64	−0.62
Majority		3,807	1.75	−4.6
Turnout		216,700	58.34	+0.1
SP gain from BJP		Swing		

2017 Uttar Pradesh Legislative Assembly Election: Saren
Party	Candidate	Votes	%	±%
BJP	Dhirendra Bahadur Singh	65,873	32.16	
BSP	Thakur Prasad Yadav	52,866	25.81	
INC	Ashok Kumar Singh	42,232	20.62	
SP	Devendra Pratap Singh	32,792	16.01	
Independent	Hori Lal	2,036	0.99	
NOTA	None of the above	2,545	1.26	
Majority		13,007	6.35	
Turnout		204,852	58.24	
