= Unchahar Assembly constituency =

Constituency of the Uttar Pradesh legislative assembly in India

Unchahar
- Constituency No. 183 for the Uttar Pradesh Legislative Assembly

Constituency details
- Country: India
- Region: North India
- State: Uttar Pradesh
- District: Rae Bareli
- Lok Sabha constituency: Rae Bareli
- Established: 2008
- Total electors: 325371 (2017)
- Reservation: None

Member of Legislative Assembly
- 18th Uttar Pradesh Legislative Assembly
- Incumbent Manoj Kumar Pandey
- Party: Bharatiya Janata Party
- Alliance: NDA
- Elected year: 2022

Unchahar is a constituency of the Uttar Pradesh Legislative Assembly covering the city of Unchahar in the Rae Bareli district of Uttar Pradesh, India.

Unchahar is one of five assembly constituencies in the Lok Sabha constituency of Rae Bareli. It was established as instructed by the Delimitaion Order 2008. It is numbered 183 among the constituencies of Uttar Pradesh Legislative Assembly.

Currently this seat is held by Manoj Pande (who later defected to the Bharatiya Janata Party) Manoj Kumar Pandey has held this seat since the first election after its creation, 2012.

== Members of Legislative Assembly ==
Year	Member	Party
2012	Manoj Kumar Pandey	Samajwadi Party
2017	Manoj Kumar Pandey	Samajwadi Party
2022 (Note: Switched to Bharatiya Janata Party in 2024.)	Manoj Kumar Pandey	Samajwadi Party

== Election results ==
=== 2027 ===
2027 Uttar Pradesh Legislative Assembly election: Unchahar
Party	Candidate	Votes	%	±%
INDIA	Swami Prasad Maurya			
NDA	Manoj Pandey			
BSP				
NOTA	None of the above			
Majority				
Turnout				
gain from		Swing		

=== 2022 ===
2022 Uttar Pradesh Legislative Assembly election: Unchahar
Party	Candidate	Votes	%	±%
SP	Manoj Kumar Pandey	82,514	38.92	▲10.38
BJP	Amarpal Maurya	75,893	35.79	▲8.18
BSP	Anjali Maurya	34,692	16.36	▼5.54
INC	Atul Singh	9,985	4.71	▼11.84
NOTA	None of the above	1,243	0.59	▼0.64
Majority		6,621	3.13	▲2.2
Turnout		212,030	62.54	▼1.11
SP hold		Swing	+10.7%	

=== 2017 ===
2017 Uttar Pradesh Legislative Assembly election: Unchahar
Party	Candidate	Votes	%	±%
SP	Manoj Kumar Pandey	59,103	28.54	
BJP	Utkrist Maurya	57,169	27.61	
BSP	Vivek Vikram Singh	45,356	21.9	
INC	Ajai Pal Singh	34,274	16.55	
BMP	Mohd Junaid	2,000	0.97	
NOTA	None of the above	2,517	1.23	
Majority		1,934	0.93	
Turnout		207,088	63.65	
SP hold		Swing	-4.7%	

=== 2012 ===
2012 Uttar Pradesh Legislative Assembly election: Unchahar
Party	Candidate	Votes	%	±%
SP	Manoj Kumar Pandey	61,930	33.2	−
BSP	Utkrist Maurya	59,348	31.8	−
INC	Ajay Pal Singh	47,898	25.7	−
Independent	Jitendra Bahadur Singh	3,814	2.0	−
BJP	Ramesh Kumar	3,763	2.0	−
Majority		2,582	1.4%	−
Turnout		1,86,356	64.7%	New Seat

Note: Constituency was established in 2008, hence no swing data.

== See also ==
- Rae Bareli District
- Rae Bareli Lok Sabha constituency
- 18th Uttar Pradesh Legislative Assembly
- Uttar Pradesh Vidhan Sabha
