= Temulji Bhicaji Nariman =

Indian obstetrician (1848–1940)

Sir Temulji Bhicaji Nariman RCSEd
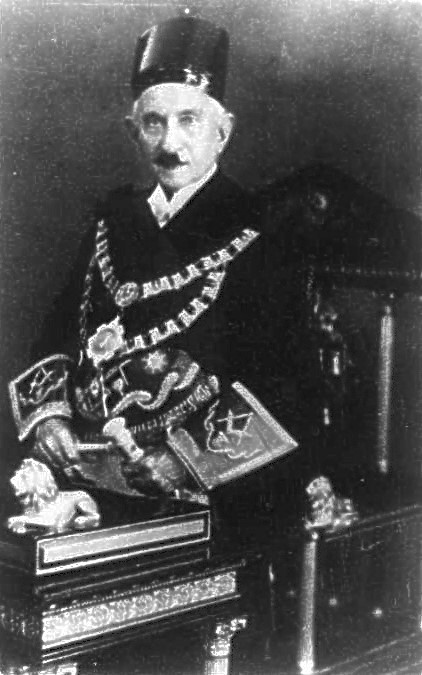
- Nariman in his freemason's robes
- Born: 3 September 1848
- Died: 1 August 1940 (aged 91)
- Occupations: Obstetrician and physician
- Known for: Founding Bombay's Parsi Lying-in Hospital in 1887
- Medical career
- Awards: Kaisar-i-Hind Medal (1909)

Sir Temulji Bhicaji Nariman RCSEd, also recorded as Tehmulji B. Nariman (3 September 1848 – 1 August 1940), was a obstetrician from Bombay (now Mumbai) who co-founded one of the city's first lying-in hospitals in 1887 and was knighted in 1914 for his work during the plague epidemic in India at the turn of the 19th century.

A graduate of Grant Medical College, he became its Dean and remained active in medical education. He headed the maternity hospital for twenty-one years, was awarded the Kaisar-i-Hind Medal in 1909 and became president of the College of Physicians and Surgeons of Bombay.

== Early life and family ==
Temulji B. Nariman was born on 3 September 1848 to a poor family at Navsari.

His marriage to Lady Nariman of Bombay of 86 years duration was officially noted as the longest marriage ever recorded.

== Career ==
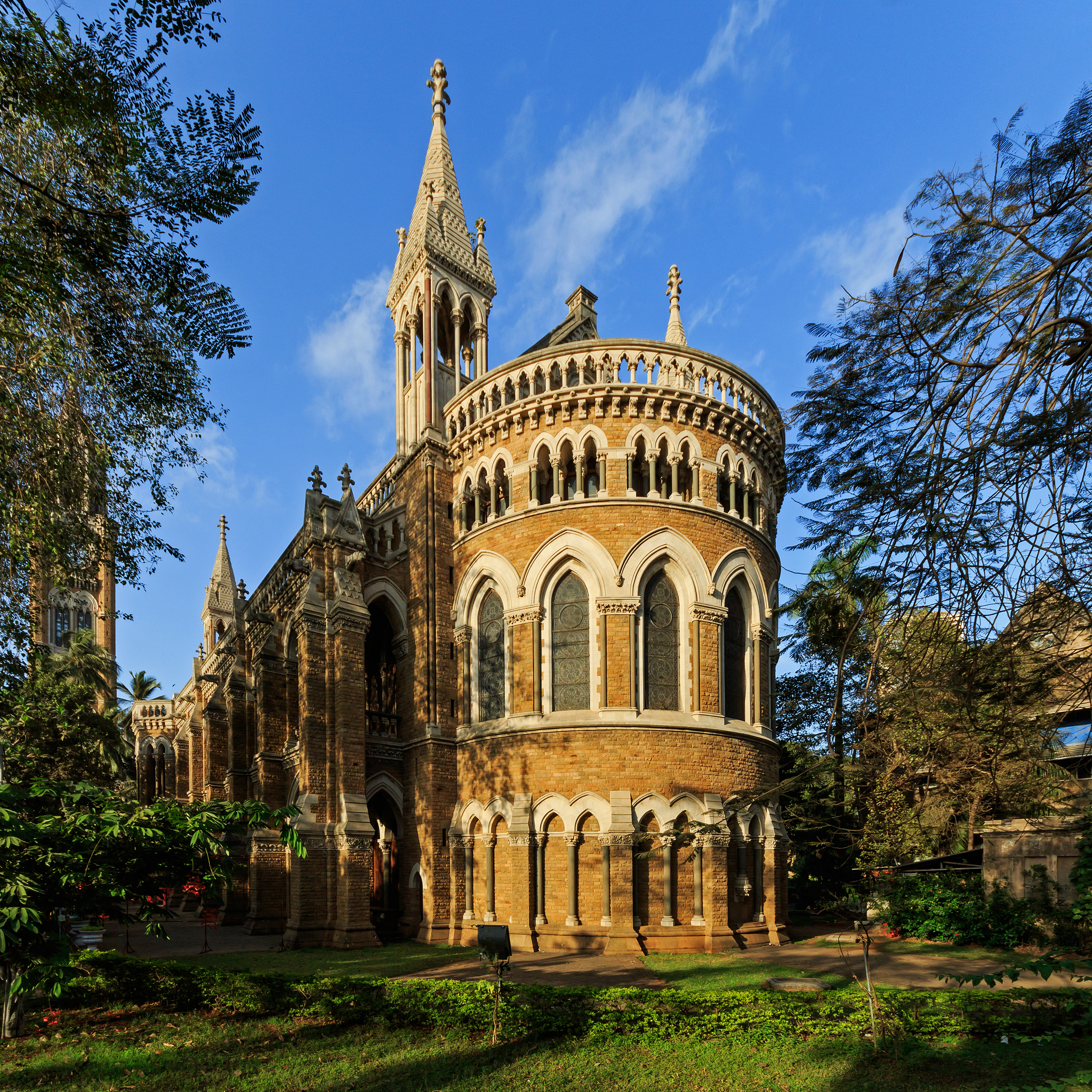
Mumbai (Bombay) University

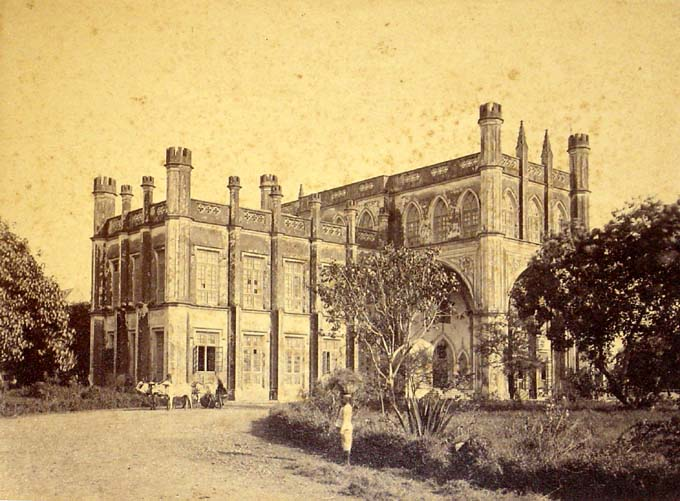
Old Grant Medical College building, 1860

In 1872, Temulji passed his medical licentiate at Grant Medical College. Subsequently, he became the first University of Bombay graduate to be elected its medical Dean.

In 1887, his interest in puerperal fever led him to co-found the Parsi Lying-in Hospital, one of Bombay's first maternity hospitals, which was completed in 1895. It was later popularly known as Temulji's Lying-in Hospital and he came to be symbolic of "Parsi motherhood". Nariman headed the maternity hospital for twenty one years and joined the Governor's council in 1910.

In 1902, he prepared an essay describing his time at Grant Medical College (1867 to 1902). Among the descriptions of the training and examination arrangements there he noted that the college physicians were often in competition with local "quacks" and unqualified medical practitioners known as vaids and hakims who offered traditional remedies and sometimes were able to claim a success when a patient who was already close to recovery was transferred to their care.

For his diverse activities, Nariman was awarded the gold Kaisar-i-Hind Medal in 1909.

In 1913, Nariman was elected vice president of the newly formed College of Physicians and Surgeons of Bombay and later became its president.

He was knighted in 1914 for his work during the plague epidemic in India at the turn of the 19th century. He later became a Fellow of Royal College of Surgeons of Edinburgh in 1922, by which time he claimed to have attended more than 25,000 maternity cases. He was selected as Sheriff of Bombay for 1922–23.

From 1932 to 1938, he was grandmaster of the District Grand Lodge of India, the first grandmaster of All Scottish Freemasonry in India.

== Death and legacy ==
Nariman died on 1 August 1940 at almost 92. A painting of him was unveiled at Grant Medical College in 1925. In 2014, plans were confirmed to rebuild Temulji's Lying-in hospital into an orthopaedic hospital.
