= Harchandpur Assembly constituency =

Constituency of the Uttar Pradesh legislative assembly in India

Harchandpur
- Constituency No. 179 for the Uttar Pradesh Legislative Assembly

Constituency details
- Country: India
- Region: North India
- State: Uttar Pradesh
- District: Rae Bareli
- Reservation: None

Member of Legislative Assembly
- 18th Uttar Pradesh Legislative Assembly
- Incumbent Rahul Rajpoot
- Party: Samajwadi Party
- Elected year: 2022

Harchandpur is a constituency of the Uttar Pradesh Legislative Assembly covering the city of Harchandpur in the Rae Bareli district of Uttar Pradesh, India.

Harchandpur is one of five assembly constituencies in the Lok Sabha constituency of Rae Bareli. Since 2008, this assembly constituency is numbered 179 amongst 403 constituencies.

== Members of the Legislative Assembly ==
Year	Winner	Party
2012	Surendra Vikram Singh	Samajwadi Party
2017	Rakesh Singh	Indian National Congress
2022	Rahul Rajpoot	Samajwadi Party

== Election results ==
=== 2027 ===
2027 Uttar Pradesh Legislative Assembly election: Harchandpur
Party	Candidate	Votes	%	±%
INDIA				
NDA				
BSP				
NOTA	None of the above			
Majority				
Turnout				
gain from		Swing		

=== 2022 ===
2022 Uttar Pradesh Legislative Assembly election: Harchandpur
Party	Candidate	Votes	%	±%
SP	Rahul Rajpoot	92,498	45.87	
BJP	Rakesh Singh	78,009	38.69	+5.56
INC	Surendra Vikram Singh	16,230	8.05	−27.05
BSP	Sher Bahadur	7,335	3.64	−20.65
NOTA	None of the above	2,411	1.2	−0.1
Majority		14,489	7.18	+5.21
Turnout		201,651	63.09	+2.04
SP gain from INC		Swing		

=== 2017 ===
Indian National Congress candidate Rakesh Singh won in 2017 Uttar Pradesh Legislative Elections defeating BJP candidate Kanchan Lodhi by a margin of 3,652 votes.

2017 Uttar Pradesh Legislative Assembly Election: Harchandpu
Party	Candidate	Votes	%	±%
INC	Rakesh Singh	65,104	35.1	
BJP	Kanchan Lodhi	61,452	33.13	
BSP	Manish Kumar Singh	45,057	24.29	
Independent	Rakesh	2,277	1.23	
NOTA	None of the above	2,376	1.3	
Majority		3,652	1.97	
Turnout		185,489	61.05	
