= Ashok Singh (politician, born 1955) =

Indian politician

Member of Parliament, Lok Sabha
- In office 1996–1999
- Preceded by: Sheila Kaul
- Succeeded by: Satish Sharma
- Constituency: Rae Bareli

Member of Uttar Pradesh Legislative Assembly
- In office 1989–1992
- Preceded by: Ramesh Chandra Shukla
- Succeeded by: Akhilesh Kumar Singh
- Constituency: Rae Bareli

Personal details
- Born: 12 January 1955 (age 71) Lalupur Khas, Uttar Pradesh, India
- Party: Bharatiya Janata Party
- Other political affiliations: Janata Dal
- Spouse: Kiran Singh (m. 1977)
- Children: 2 sons, 1 daughter
- Parent: Devendra Nath Singh (father)

Ashok Singh (born 12 January 1955) is an India politician. He was elected from Rae Bareli on the BJP ticket for the 11th and 12th Lok Sabha.

He married Kiran Singh on 21 May 1977 and they have two sons and one daughter.

== Positions held ==
- 1987: Block Pramukh, Amawa, Rae Bareli
- 1989-92: Member, Uttar Pradesh Legislative Assembly (two terms)
- 1996: Elected to 11th Lok Sabha
- 1996-98: Member, Committee on Urban and Rural Development
- 1998: Re-elected to 12th Lok Sabha (2nd term)
- 1998-99: Member, Committee on Human Resource Development and its Sub-Committee on Drug Control
- Member, Consultative Committee, Ministry of Petroleum and Natural Gas
- Chairman, District. Co-operative Bank Ltd. since 1994
