= Raebareli Assembly constituency =

Constituency of the Uttar Pradesh legislative assembly in India

Rae Bareli
- Constituency No. 180 for the Uttar Pradesh Legislative Assembly

Constituency details
- Country: India
- Region: North India
- State: Uttar Pradesh
- District: Rae Bareli
- Lok Sabha constituency: Rae Bareli
- Reservation: None

Member of Legislative Assembly
- 18th Uttar Pradesh Legislative Assembly
- Incumbent Aditi Singh
- Party: Bharatiya Janata Party
- Elected year: 2022

Rae Bareli is a constituency of the Uttar Pradesh Legislative Assembly covering the city of Rae Bareli in the Rae Bareli district of Uttar Pradesh, India.

Rae Bareli (रायबरेली) is one of five assembly constituencies in the Rae Bareli Lok Sabha constituency. Since 2008, this assembly constituency is numbered 180 amongst 403 constituencies.

Currently this seat belongs to Aditi Singh who won in last Assembly election of 2017 Uttar Pradesh Legislative Elections, as Congress candidate, defeating Bahujan Samaj Party candidate Mohd Shahbaz Khan by a margin of more than 90,000 votes. In May 2020, Aditi Singh was suspended from Congress Party for indiscipline amidst rumours that she was getting close to BJP. In November 2021 Aditi Singh officially joined BJP.

== Vidhan Sabha Members ==
Year	Member	Party
1962	Krishna Pal Singh	Bharatiya Jana Sangh
1962	Rati Pal	Praja Socialist Party
1967	Madan Mohan Misra	Indian National Congress
1969	Madan Mohan Misra	Indian National Congress
1974	Sunita Chauhan	Indian National Congress
1977	Mohan Lal Tripathi	Indian National Congress
1980	Ramesh Chandra Shukla	Indian National Congress (I)
1985	Ramesh Chandra Shukla	Indian National Congress
1989	Ashok Kumar Singh	Janata Dal
1991	Ashok Kumar Singh	Janata Dal
1993	Akhilesh Kumar Singh	Indian National Congress
1996	Akhilesh Kumar Singh	Indian National Congress
2002	Akhilesh Kumar Singh	Indian National Congress
2007	Akhilesh Kumar Singh	Independent
2012	Akhilesh Kumar Singh	Peace Party of India
2017	Aditi Singh	Indian National Congress
2022	Aditi Singh	Bharatiya Janata Party

== Election results ==
Vote share of winning candidates
2022	44.51%
2017	61.89%
2012	39.73%
2007	51.90%
2002	74.18%
1996	62.19%
1993	49.73%
1991	32.80%
1989	42.60%

=== 2027 ===
2027 Uttar Pradesh Legislative Assembly election: Raebareli
Party	Candidate	Votes	%	±%
INDIA				
NDA				
BSP				
NOTA	None of the above			
Majority				
Turnout				
gain from		Swing		

=== 2022 ===
2022 Uttar Pradesh Legislative Assembly election: Rae Bareli
Party	Candidate	Votes	%	±%
BJP	Aditi Singh	102,429	44.51	+30.61
SP	Ram Pratap Yadav	95,254	41.40	
INC	Manish Chauhan	14,954	6.50	−55.39
BSP	Mohd Ashraf	9,331	4.06	−14.83
NOTA	None of the above	2,281	0.99	−0.7
Majority		7,175	3.11	−39.89
Turnout		230,100	62.82	+3.81
BJP gain from INC		Swing		

=== 2017 ===
2017 Uttar Pradesh Legislative Assembly Election: Raebarel
Party	Candidate	Votes	%	±%
INC	Aditi Singh	128,319	61.89	
BSP	Mohd Shahbaz Khan	39,156	18.89	
BJP	Anita Srivastava	28,821	13.90	
NOTA	None of the above	3,448	1.69	
Majority		89,163	43.00	
Turnout		207,329	59.01	
INC gain from PECP		Swing		

=== 2012 ===
2012 Uttar Pradesh Legislative Assembly election: Rae Bareli
Party	Candidate	Votes	%	±%
PECP	Akhilesh Kumar Singh	75,588	39.73	New
SP	Ram Pratap Yadav	46,094	24.22	+13.22
INC	Avadhesh Bahadur Singh	35,660	18.74	−1.51
BSP	Pushpendra Singh	18,809	9.89	+2.07
BJP	Sushil Sharma	3,940	2.07	−0.07
Majority		29,494	15.51	−16.14
Turnout		189,647	60.11	

=== 2007 ===
2007 Uttar Pradesh Legislative Assembly election: Rae Bareli
Party	Candidate	Votes	%	±%
Independent	Akhilesh Kumar Singh	76,603	51.90	New
INC	Rudra Pratap Singh	29,892	20.25	−53.93
SP	Rajiv Kumar	16,236	11.00	−1.83
BSP	Ram Lautan Singh	11,540	7.82	+4.66
BJP	Kusum Singh	3,159	2.14	New
Majority		46,711	31.65	−29.70
Turnout		147,607		

=== 2002 ===
2002 Uttar Pradesh Legislative Assembly election: Rae Bareli
Party	Candidate	Votes	%	±%
INC	Akhilesh Kumar Singh	115,869	74.18	+11.99
SP	Rajeev Kumar	20,032	12.83	New
LJP	Arvind	8,327	5.33	New
BSP	Ram Narayan	4,941	3.16	New
Independent	Shiv Nath Singh	3,567	2.28	+1.82
Majority		95,837	61.35	+17.24
Turnout		156,190	53.95	+1.79

=== 1996 ===
1996 Uttar Pradesh Legislative Assembly election: Rae Bareli
Party	Candidate	Votes	%	±%
INC	Akhilesh Kumar Singh	86,358	62.19	+12.46
BJP	Santosh Kumar Misra	25,105	18.08	−4.26
JD	Jagannath Singh	23,846	17.17	New
BJSH	Baldev	1,112	0.80	New
AD	Neeta Patel	919	0.66	New
Majority		61,253	44.11	+16.72
Turnout		138,853	52.16	−7.56

=== 1993 ===
1993 Uttar Pradesh Legislative Assembly election: Rae Bareli
Party	Candidate	Votes	%	±%
INC	Akhilesh Kumar Singh	69,505	49.73	+31.20
BJP	Pradeep Kumar Trivedi (Pappu)	31,226	22.34	+7.69
SP	Raurdeen	27,307	19.54	New
BKD	Mohan Lal Kamal	1,825	1.31	New
Independent	Bhaumesh Kumar	1,268	0.91	New
Majority		38,279	27.39	+18.14
Turnout		139,755	59.72	+7.58

=== 1991 ===
1991 Uttar Pradesh Legislative Assembly election: Rae Bareli
Party	Candidate	Votes	%	±%
JD	Ashok Kumar Singh	34,231	32.80	
JP	Ram Naresh Yadav	24,582	23.55	
INC	Uma Shankar Mishra	19,336	18.53	
BJP	Surendra Bahadur Singh	15,292	14.65	
BSP	Mohan Lal	4,699	4.50	
Majority		9,649	9.25	
Turnout		104,377	52.14	

=== 1989 ===
1989 Uttar Pradesh Legislative Assembly election: Rae Bareli
Party	Candidate	Votes	%	±%
JD	Ashok Kumar Singh	44,035	42.60	
INC	Ramesh Chandu Shukl	38,017	36.78	
BJP	Sushil Kumar Sharma	4,538	4.39	
BSP	Kanta Prasad Mourya	3,064	2.96	
Janata Party (JP)	Moti Lal	2,626	2.54	
Majority		6,018	5.82	
Turnout		103,374	51.67	

=== 1967 ===
- M. M. Misra (INC) : 24,422 votes.
- J. Prasad (BJS) : 6,999 votes.
