= John Henderson (guard) =

American football player (1912–2020)

Profile
- Position: Guard

Personal information
- Born: December 24, 1912; Fort Worth, Texas
- Died: October 16, 2020 (aged 107); Austin, Texas

Career information
- College: University of Texas at Austin

John Paul Henderson (December 24, 1912 – October 16, 2020) was an American college football player who played four seasons as a guard for the Texas Longhorns. Raised in Fort Worth, Texas, he was a member of the team from 1932 through 1936. He later worked for Humble Oil for over thirty years and eventually became the school's oldest living former football player in 2010.

== Early and personal life ==
Henderson was born on December 24, 1912, and grew up in Fort Worth, Texas. He entered the University of Texas at Austin in 1932 and joined the Longhorns as a guard that same year. He remained a member of the team until 1936, when he graduated with a master's degree in education. He met his wife, Charlotte Curtis (November 8, 1914 – October 26, 2021), in class in 1934. They were married on December 22, 1939, and celebrated their 80th anniversary in 2019, as the oldest living couple in the world.

== Football ==
Henderson joined the Longhorns in an era when the University of Texas neither recruited players nor offered them scholarships. To support himself, he worked at the Gregory Gymnasium two hours a day to earn $30 a month (approximately $708 in present-day terms). The University of Texas was part of the Southwest Conference at the time and Henderson played his first season under coach Clyde Littlefield. That year, the team finished 5-1, behind conference champions Texas Christian University, and 8–2 overall. The following year, again under Littlefield, the Longhorns finished 2-3-1 in their conference and 4-5-2 overall. In 1934 Littlefield was replaced by Jack Chevigny and the squad went 4-1-1 in the conference, behind Rice, and 7-2-1 overall. In his final season, under Chevigny, the Longhorns were 4–6 overall and 1–5 in their conference.

== Later life ==
Henderson and Curtis moved to Baytown, Texas, after graduation. They later married, and worked in Houston, where Curtis found employment as a teacher and Henderson at Humble Oil. He retired in the 1970s and in 2009 returned to Austin as the first resident of Longhorn Village, a retirement community for the school's alumni. Henderson became the Longhorns' oldest living former player in 2010 and turned 100 in 2012. As of 2016, he had attended at least one Longhorn football game each season since his 1932 debut. In November 2019, Henderson, 106, and Curtis, 105, were named world's oldest living couple by Guinness World Records. Henderson died on October 16, 2020, in Austin at the age of 107. His wife Charlotte died just over a year later on October 26, 2021, at the age of 106.

== See also ==
- List of centenarians (sportspeople)
