= List of long marriages =

This is a list of long marriages. It includes only marriages extending over at least 80 years.

== Background ==
A study by Robert and Jeanette Lauer, reported in the Journal of Family Issues, conducted on 40 sets of spouses married for at least 50 years, concluded that the long-term married couples received high scores on the Lock-Wallace marital satisfaction test and were closely aligned on how their marriages were doing. In a 1979 study on about 55 couples in marriages with an average length of 55.5 years, couples said their marriages lasted so long because of mutual devotion and special regard for each other. Couples who have been married for a long time have a lower likelihood of divorcing because "common economic interests and friendship networks increase over time" and enduring stress can assist in sustaining the relationship.

Another study found that people in long marriages are wedded to the idea of "marital permanency" in which "They don't see divorce as an option". Sociologist Pepper Schwartz, the American Association of Retired Persons's relationships authority, said that it was helpful to have a spouse who is quick to recover when there are surprises in life.

A study of 1,152 couples who had been married for over 50 years found that they attributed their long marriages to faith in each other, love, ability to make concessions, admiration for each other, reliance on each other, children, and strong communication. Bowling Green State University (BGSU)'s National Center for Family and Marriage Research found that 7% of American marriages last at least 50 years.

== Recording longest marriages ==
The longest marriage recorded (although not officially recognized) is a granite wedding anniversary (90 years) between Karam and Kartari Chand, who both lived in the United Kingdom, but were married in India. The couple married in 1925, and died in 2016 and 2019, respectively.

Guinness World Records published its first edition in 1955. In the 1984 to 1998 editions, the longest recorded marriages were between Sir Temulji Bhicaji and Lady Nariman, and Lazarus and Mary Molly Rowe. According to the New England Historical and Genealogical Register, both of them are stated as spanning 86 years. Guinness has since recognized couples with longer marriage spans, with the current world record holders (as of 2024) being David and Sarah Hiller. It also keeps record of the oldest married couple by aggregate age.

Other organizations have created events where they honor couples with long marriages. In 2011, World Marriage Encounter (WME), an American organization that was responsible for making a World Marriage Day, created a Longest Married Couple Project (LMCP), where they pick a couple with a long marriage and honor them on Valentine's Day. They have since expanded the awards to representatives in each of the 50 states, although the candidates selected are not necessarily the ones with record-setting marriages. Starting in 2004, the Louisiana Family Forum (LFF) has honored its annual list of long-time married couples in that particular state, beginning with George and Germaine Briant.

== List of marriages reported of 80 years or more ==
At least one spouse is deceased, or the marriage had ended in divorce Both spouses are (most likely) still living and still married Disputed and/or unverified

Names	Marriage date	Length of marriage	End date (death of first spouse or divorce)	Residence (at date of last report, first death, or divorce)	Notes	Refs
Karam Chand; Kartari Chand	11 December 1925	90 years, 291 days	27 September 2016 (Karam)	Bradford, United Kingdom	(Note: Not recognized by Guinness World Records)	
David Jacob Hiller; Sarah (née Davy) Hiller	23 April 1809	88 years, 350 days	8 April 1898 (Sarah)	Michigan, United States	Recognized by Guinness World Records as longest marriage ever as of 2024	
K. Philipose Thomas; Sosamma Thomas	17 February 1918	88 years, 2 days	19 February 2006 (Sosamma)	Kerala, India		
Herbert Fisher Sr. Zelmyra (née George) Fisher	13 May 1924	86 years, 290 days	27 February 2011 (Herbert Sr.)	North Carolina, United States	Was previously recognized by Guinness World Records as longest marriage ever	
Sir Temulji Bhicaji Nariman; Lady Nariman	c. 31 December 1853	c. 86 years, 214 days	1 August 1940 (Sir Temulji Bhicaji)	Maharashtra, India	Temulji and Lady Nariman married as cousins when they were five years old. This was noted as the longest marriage recorded through 1940. Shared Guinness World Record with Lazarus and Mary Molly Rowe for editions up to 1998.	
Liu Yung-Yang; Liu Yang Yang-Wan	10 March 1917	86 years, 133 days	21 July 2003 (Yang Yang-Wan)	Taoyuan, Taiwan	Was recognized by Guinness World Records 2004 (published in 2003) as world's longest marriage	
Ralph Kohler; Dorothy (née Redding) Kohler	16 September 1935	86 years, 77 days	2 December 2021 (Dorothy)	California, United States	Recognized as America's longest lived married couple in 2020 and 2021	
John George Betar Sr. Ann (née Shawah) Betar	25 November 1932	85 years, 291 days	12 September 2018 (John George Sr.)	Connecticut, United States	Winner of the "Worldwide Marriage Encounter's Longest Married Couple Project" in 2013	
Duranord Veillard; Jeanne Hermina Veillard	29 November 1932	85 years, 184 days	1 June 2018 (Duranord)	New York, United States		
Lazarus Rowe; Mary Molly (née Webber) Rowe	c. 31 December 1743	c. 85 years, 178 days	27 June 1829 (Mary Molly)	Maine, United States	Shared Guinness World Record with Sir and Lady Nariman for editions up to 1998	
Oliver Jackson Glenn; Cora Lee (née Clark) Glenn	6 November 1904	85 years, 48 days	24 December 1989 (Oliver Jackson)	Alabama, United States	Previously recognized as the "Longest-married American couple" in 1989	
Tadanosuke Hashimoto; Hanae Hashimoto	1911	c. 85 years	c. 1996/7 (Hanae)	Hyogo, Japan		
Manoel Angelim Dino; Maria Almeida (née de Souza) Dino	20 November 1940	84 years, 334 days	20 October 2025 (Manoel)	Boa Viagem, Brazil	Recognized by Guinness World Records as the then longest incumbent marriage in February 2025. Longest validated marriage in Brazil ever.	
Mario Calì; Antonina (née Ardilio) Calì	19 November 1931	84 years, 328 days	12 October 2016 (Antonina)	Sicily, Italy	Recognized as the "longest marriage in Europe" in 2015	
William Fullingim; Nancy (née Watson) Fullingim	11 August 1879	84 years, 259 days	26 April 1964 (Nancy)	Oklahoma, United States		
Cleovis Whiteside Sr. Arwilda (née Kelly) Whiteside	24 July 1939	84 years, 242 days	23 March 2024 (Cleovis Sr.)	Arkansas, United States	Recognized as the longest marriage in the state	
José Francisco dos Santos; Otacília Gomes (née de Oliveira) dos Santos	1 February 1929	84 years, 231 days	20 September 2013 (José Francisco)	Poço das Trincheiras, Brazil	Possibly the last marriage of the 1920s in which both parties were still alive. Also previously recognized as the longest known marriage in Brazil.	
Lyle Gittens; Eleanor Gittens	4 June 1942	84 years, 164 days		Florida, United States	Recognized by Guinness World Records as the then longest incumbent marriage in November 2025.	
Marco Milo; Pasqua (née Palmieri) Milo	15 January 1938	84 years, 122 days	17 May 2022 (Marco)	Bari, Italy		
Francisco Garcia; Paulina (née Calvillo) Garcia	26 May 1926	84 years, 92 days	26 August 2010 (Paulina)	Texas, United States	Recognized as "Texas's oldest married couple" in 2008	
William J. "Bill" Jones; Eluned Jones	3 February 1923	83 years, 359 days	28 January 2007 ("Bill")	Pontypridd, United Kingdom	Longest marriage ever in the United Kingdom and previously recognized as the "World's longest marriage" in 2006	
Maurice Kaye; Helen Kaye	27 August 1934	83 years, 330 days	23 July 2018 (Maurice)	Bournemouth, United Kingdom		
Daniel W. Williams; Willie Williams	17 August 1937	83 years, 318 days	1 July 2021 (Daniel W.)	North Carolina, United States		
Elton Denner; Betty (née Lord) Denner	18 October 1942	83 years, 308 days	22 August 2026 (Betty D.)	Oregon, United States		
Thell E. Ellison; Margie Lea (née Rose) Ellison	24 June 1941	83 years, 303 days	23 April 2025 (Thell E.)	Arkansas, United States		
Eduard Gerardus Sophia "Ward" Cuyvers; Maria Angelina/e (née Haeseldonckx) Cuyvers	30 January 1943	83 years, 289 days		Houthalen-Helchteren, Belgium	Recognized as the longest marriage in the history of Belgium, also its first ever marriage of at least 80 years. He was inducted in the Order of Leopold.	
Henry Andrew Johnson; Lena (née Knudsen) Johnson	8 February 1920	83 years, 231 days	27 September 2003 (Lena)	Iowa, United States		
William B. Ritchie; Claudia Lillian Ritchie	12 April 1919	83 years, 224 days	22 November 2002 (William B.)	Kentucky, United States	Previously recognized as the "World's oldest married couple" in 2002	
Norman James Burmah; Norma "Mickey" (née Depland) Burmah	27 January 1931	83 years, 222 days	6 September 2014 ("Mickey")	Louisiana, United States	Recognized by the Louisiana Family Forum in 2013 and 2014. Also recognized as the longest marriage in the state.	
Marshall N. Kuykendall; Winifred Louisiana "Winnie Louise" (née Macnab) Kuykendall	14 February 1929	83 years, 221 days	22 September 2012 ("Winnie Louise")	New Mexico, United States	Winner of the Worldwide Marriage Encounter's inaugural Longest Married Couple Project in 2011	
Harold Levine; Sylvia Levine	2 November 1941	83 years, 210 days	31 May 2025 (Harold)	Florida, United States		
George Leon Briant; Germaine (née Thibodeaux) Briant	20 July 1921	83 years, 192 days	28 January 2005 (Germaine)	Louisiana, United States	Honored by Congressman David Vitter in the Louisiana Family Forum's inaugural Louisiana's longest married couple contest in 2004. George, a World War I veteran, was interviewed by Richard Rubin in the same year.	
Steven "Steve" Wrubel; Victoria Virginia "Vicky" (née Puvalowski) Wrubel	28 August 1929	83 years, 192 days	8 April 2013 ("Vicky")	Florida, United States	Were recognized by Guinness World Records in 2011, but did not clinch the record	
René Saulet; Lucienne Saulet (née Perez)	22 May 1943	83 years, 177 days		Thouarcé, France		
Evert Stolpe; Anni (née Lepistö) Stolpe	24 March 1941	83 years, 176 days	16 September 2024 (Evert)	Ostrobothnia, Finland		
Harley Dewey Utz; Sylvia (née Booker) Utz	15 June 1918	83 years, 150 days	12 November 2001 (Harley Dewey)	Ohio, United States	Recognized by Guinness World Records as the world's oldest living married couple in 2001. Sylvia survived her husband by almost 8 years, eventually becoming a supercentenarian.	
Albert Squilla; Anna Squilla	7 November 1942	c. 83 years, 144 days	March 2026 (Anna)	Pennsylvania, United States		
Marcel Brouard; Berthe (née Pallu) Brouard	26 November 1938	83 years, 131 days	6 April 2022 (Marcel)	Saint-Éliph, France	Recognized as the longest marriage in the history of France	
Harold Clyde Park; Josephine "Jo" (née May) Park	19 December 1941	83 years, 125 days	23 April 2025 (Harold Clyde)	Texas, United States		
George Cuthbert Clarence Vail; Mayme Lillie (née Arcand) Vail	17 February 1925	83 years, 118 days	14 June 2008 (George Cuthbert Clarence)	Minnesota, United States	Previously recognized as the "Longest married couple in the United States"	
René Debove; Denise (née Dauboin) Debove	4 October 1941	83 years, 99 days	11 January 2025 (Denise)	Clermont-l'Hérault, France		
Allan McDowell; Dorothy McDowell	26 September 1941	83 years, 83 days	18 December 2024 (Allan)	United Kingdom		
Ira B. Milan; Margery Mary (née Peter) Milan	17 January 1942	83 years, 82 days	9 April 2025 (Margery Mary)	Louisiana, United States	Recognized by the Louisiana Family Forum in 2023, 2024 and 2025	
Charles Henry Feuton Humbles; Joyce Irene (née Munday) Humbles	23 November 1940	83 years, 53 days	15 January 2024 (Joyce Irene)	Hertfordshire, United Kingdom	Previously recognised as the oldest lived married couple in the United Kingdom	
Thommen Thomas; Aley (née Thomman) Thomas	13 February 1932	82 years, 351 days	30 January 2015 (Note: It is unknown as to which spouse's death ended the marriage)	Thodupuzha, India		
Cal(vin) Elmer Dunmire; Mina Lena (née Boarts) Dunmire	24 April 1906	82 years, 328 days	18 March 1989 (Mina Lena)	Pennsylvania, United States	Nominated as "Nation's longest married couple"	
Raimundo Barros Ferreira; Nair (née Lopes) Ferreira	1 July 1939	82 years, 321 days	18 May 2022 (Nair)	Fortaleza, Brazil		
Raymond Johnson; Mary Johnson	11 January 1944	82 years, 308 days		Florida, United States		
Ignacy Stasiak; Stefania (née Sałata) Stasiak	1 February 1931	82 years, 302 days	30 November 2013 (Ignacy)	Aleksandrów Łódzki, Poland	Recognized as the "Longest marriage in [the history of] Poland"	
Arend Noordhuis; Aaltje (née Nijstad) Noordhuis	22 January 1938	82 years, 298 days	15 November 2020 (Arend)	Ruinen, Netherlands	Recognized as the longest marriage in the history of the Netherlands	
João Manoel Gonçalves; Serafina (née Melo) Gonçalves	2 May 1934	82 years, 218 days	6 December 2016 (Serafina)	Torres, Brazil		
Gottfried Schmelzer; Ursula Schmelzer	17 May 1944	82 years, 182 days		Bad Sobernheim, Germany		
Orlando Simas; Ephigenia Xavier (née da Silva) Simas	28 October 1942	82 years, 179 days	25 April 2025 (Ephigenia)	Petrópolis, Brazil		
Christopher James "Mick" Girlow; Edith Florence Girlow	15 November 1940	82 years, 168 days	2 May 2023 ("Mick")	Hampshire, United Kingdom		
Isalino Miranda Costa; Elvira (née Mendes) Costa	31 January 1932	82 years, 120 days	31 May 2014 (Elvira)	Taiobeiras, Brazil		
George Dennis; Louise Dennis	4 February 1944	82 years, 120 days	4 June 2026 (George)	Alabama, United States	Recognized as the longest marriage in the state	
Robert W. "Bob" Schaum; Edith Mae Schaum	26 December 1942	82 years, 113 days	18 April 2025 ("Bob")	Pennsylvania, United States		
Alton B. Daniels; Opal (née Schronk) Daniels	12 August 1944	82 years, 95 days		Texas, United States	He is a World War II veteran	
Eric Frank Kingston; Annie Sarah "Nancy" Kingston	1 June 1940	82 years, 72 days	12 August 2022 (Eric Frank)	Blackford, United Kingdom		
David P. Beachy; Katherine (née Swartz) Beachy	23 December 1939	82 years, 59 days	20 February 2022 (David P.)	Florida, United States		
Alberto José Leite; Francisca (née de Oliveira) Leite	20 January 1938	82 years, 42 days	2 March 2020 (Alberto José)	Ibirama, Brazil		
William Aaron Bruce; Georgette Nadine (née Holth) Bruce	19 June 1943	82 years, 25 days	14 July 2025 (Georgette)	Indiana, United States		
Lauris Broussard; Earline Marie (née Dyson) Broussard	25 January 1941	82 years, 15 days	9 February 2023 (Earline Marie)	Louisiana, United States	Recognized by the Louisiana Family Forum in 2022 and 2023	
Edgar Eugene "Gene" Bond; Irene (née Montgomery) Bond	15 August 1942	82 years, 4 days	19 August 2024 ("Gene")	Oklahoma, United States		
José "Major" Amâncio de Almeida; Anna Amâncio	17 July 1939	c. 81/82 years	c. 2021/2	Belo Horizonte, Brazil		
Vernon H. Mize; Ruth Ann (née Wright) Mize	15 November 1944	82 years, 0 days		Kentucky, United States		
Ronald "Ron" Bond; Joyce E. (née Sanders) Bond	4 January 1941	81 years, 350 days	20 December 2022 ("Ron")	Milton Keynes, United Kingdom		
Francisco Fernandes Alencar; Sebastiana Coelho (née de Matos) Alencar	October 1936	c. 81 years, 345 days	11 September 2018 (Sebastiana)	Federal District, Brazil		
Olegário Batista de Queiroz; Rita de Queiroz	20 December 1937	81 years, 339 days	24 November 2019 (Olegário Batista)	São Francisco de Sales, Brazil	Previously recognized as the longest marriage in Brazil in 2018 and 2019	
Robert "Bob" Cochran; Ann (née Yates) Cochran	30 December 1944	81 years, 320 days		South Carolina, United States		
Mota Eli Young; Avanelle (née McGinnis) Young	14 April 1936	81 years, 314 days	22 February 2018 (Mota Eli)	Kentucky, United States	He was a World War II veteran	
Cecil Belvedire "Cy" Souders; Jean (née Hoover) Souders	18 November 1939	81 years, 285 days	30 August 2021 ("Cy")	Ohio, United States	He was a retired National Football League (NFL) player who played three seasons for the Detroit Lions in the 1940s and also the oldest living ex-NFL player	
Gail Richardson; Marjorie Rita "Patsy" (née Naquin) Richardson	1 September 1940	81 years, 285 days	13 June 2022 ("Patsy")	Louisiana, United States	Recognized by the Louisiana Family Forum in 2020, 2021 and 2022. He was a World War II veteran.	
Jean Couret; Christiane (née Reynaud) Couret	27 May 1944	81 years, 269 days	20 February 2026 (Jean)	Saint-Julien-Chapteuil, France		
Isaías "Zai" Fernandes Farias; Elília "Lila" (née Ribeiro) Farias	9 September 1938	81 years, 258 days	24 May 2020 ("Lila")	Brotas de Macaúbas, Brazil		
Laura Mays; Billie Mays	13 April 1945	81 years, 216 days		Texas, United States		
Masao Matsumoto; Miyako (née Sonoda) Matsumoto	20 October 1937	81 years, 209 days	17 May 2019 (Masao)	Kagawa, Japan	Was recognized by Guinness World Record as "Oldest living married couple, aggregate age" in August 2018, and as "Oldest married couple, aggregate age" on 17 May 2019 (Note: At the time of Masao Matsumoto's death, on 17 May 2019, he (born 9 July 1910) was aged 108 years and 312 days and his wife, Miyako Sonoda (born 24 November 1917), 101 years and 174 days: a combined age of 210 years and 121 days)	
Charles Abraham "Charlie" Muise; Anne Celina "Annie" (née Bourque) Muise	13 July 1942	81 years, 194 days	23 January 2024 ("Charlie")	Nova Scotia, Canada		
Roy Walter; Dorothy Walter	27 July 1942	81 years, 192 days	4 February 2024 (Dorothy)	Wingham, United Kingdom	Marriage date recognized in 2017 article about their 75th wedding anniversary	
Reginald Louis Arthur "Jimmy/Reg" Woolgar; Doris Woolgar	30 August 1942	81 years, 191 days	8 March 2024 ("Jimmy/Reg")	Brighton, United Kingdom		
Vern(on) Howard Stinebaugh; Angela Mae (née Sollenberger) Stinebaugh	19 August 1942	81 years, 181 days	16 February 2024 (Angela Mae)	Pennsylvania, United States	Previously recognized as the longest marriage in the state	
Wallace P. Menard; Gladys (née Broussard) Menard	17 September 1938	81 years, 177 days	12 March 2020 (Wallace P.)	Louisiana, United States	Recognized by the Louisiana Family Forum in 2018 and 2019	
Arnold Ritson Bell; Kathleen "Kathy" Bell	16 November 1943	81 years, 173 days	8 May 2025 (Arnold)	Prudhoe, United Kingdom	He was a World War II veteran	
John McCarty; Oneta McCarty	2 June 1945	81 years, 166 days		Iowa, United States		
Isaac Benjamin Williams; Ima Jewel (née Alverson) Williams	4 September 1937	81 years, 159 days	10 February 2019 (Isaac Benjamin)	Arkansas, United States	Recognized by "The Family Council", a Christian society, in 2018	
Francis Joseph "Frank" Murray; Delma Joyce "Del" (née Earsman) Murray	16 June 1945	81 years, 152 days		Newcastle, Australia	He is the last surviving member of the 6th Machine Gun Battalion	
Jacob Miller; Edith (née Wiseman) Miller	2 July 1945	81 years, 136 days		Missouri, United States		
James Garfield Stephenson Sr. Gussie Mae (née Shirlee) Stephenson	25 December 1939	81 years, 105 days	9 April 2021 (Gussie Mae)	Arkansas, United States		
Herman "Gene" Brinson; Dovie (née Criswell) Brinson	14 February 1945	81 years, 97 days	22 May 2026 ("Gene")	Georgia, United States	Recognized as the longest marriage in the state and "Gene" was a World War II veteran	
Irving Black; Dorothy Black	11 November 1940	81 years, 92 days	11 February 2022 (Dorothy)	New York, United States		
Ray Williams; Ellie Williams	15 August 1945	81 years, 92 days		Georgia, United States	They were married on VJ Day	
Chester A. "Chet" Pish; Martha M. (née Kuchinski) Pish	23 May 1942	81 years, 89 days	20 August 2023 ("Chet")	Pennsylvania, United States	Previously recognized as the longest marriage in the state	
Jerry Long; Betty (née Williams) Long	31 August 1945	81 years, 76 days		California, United States		
Adolph Velasquez; Lucia "Lucy" (née Ramirez) Velasquez	17 July 1942	81 years, 64 days	19 September 2023 ("Lucy")	Missouri, United States		
Roy Ward; Freda Ward	1 July 1943	c. 81 years, 31 days	August 2024 (Roy)	Bilton, United Kingdom		
Warren Clinton Snell; Arline (née Larson) Snell	25 February 1940	81 years, 20 days	17 March 2021 (Warren Clinton)	Iowa, United States		
André Léon Alphonse Debry; Marguerite Céline (née Pingaud) Debry	12 August 1924	81 years, 19 days	31 August 2005 (André Léon Alphonse)	Sète, France	He was one of the last surviving World War I veterans in France and was appointed to the Légion d'Honneur.	
Daniel Frederick Bakeman; Susan (née Brewer) Bakeman	29 August 1782	81 years, 12 days	10 September 1863 (Susan)	New York, United States	He is purported to be the last surviving soldier from the Revolutionary War to receive a pension	
Leroy Kayser; Julia (née Teitler) Kayser	8 January 1944	81 years, 11 days	19 January 2025 (Leroy)	New York, United States		
Roger Lee Kunkle; Beverly B. (née Robinson) Kunkle	6 August 1943	81 years, 10 days	16 August 2024 (Roger Lee)	Ohio, United States		
Louis Herman Marine; Grace Marie (née Jacks) Marine	15 January 1942	81 years, 6 days	21 January 2023 (Grace)	California, United States		
Manoel Vargas; Saturnina (née Farias) Vargas	27 August 1930	c. 81 years	c. 2011/2	São João do Sul, Brazil		
Michael Nikolaus; Katharina Nikolaus	26 December 1924	80 years, 358 days	19 December 2005 (Katharina)	Siegen, Germany		
Elbert Maddox; Edith Maddox	24 November 1945	80 years, 356 days		Texas, United States		
Ronald "Ron" Golightly; Beryl Golightly	8 January 1941	80 years, 349 days	23 December 2021 ("Ron")	Harrogate, United Kingdom		
Loyd Monroe Collins; Evelyn Eunice (née Garlington) Collins	11 August 1934	80 years, 333 days	10 July 2015 (Evelyn Eunice)	Louisiana, United States	Recognized by the Louisiana Family Forum in 2012	
Morrie Markoff; Rebecca "Betty" (née Goldmintz) Markoff	4 November 1938	80 years, 321 days	21 September 2019 (Betty)	Los Angeles, United States	Morrie Markoff was the oldest living man in the United States and the world's oldest blogger	
João Raichaski; Maria (née Pizzetti) Raichaski	17 September 1944	80 years, 319 days	2 August 2025 (João)	Içara, Brazil		
Joseph Migné; Yolande (née Renaudineau) Migné	10 January 1944	80 years, 315 days	20 November 2024 (Joseph)	La Garnache, France		
William Henry Wilcher; Juanita Wilcher	12 May 1941	80 years, 312 days	20 March 2022 (William Henry)	Virginia, United States		
Orvel Sherrill; Virginia Lee (née Hurd) Sherrill	3 July 1942	80 years, 306 days	5 May 2023 (Virginia Lee)	Oklahoma, United States	Recognized by the Worldwide Marriage Encounter in 2022	
John Paul Henderson; Charlotte (née Curtis) Henderson	22 December 1939	80 years, 299 days	16 October 2020 (John Paul)	Texas, United States	Recognized by Guinness World Records in 2019 as the oldest living married couple by aggregate age and oldest married couple by aggregate age. (Note: At the time of John Paul Henderson's death, on 16 October 2020, he (born 24 December 1912) was aged 107 years and 297 days and his wife, Charlotte Curtis (8 November 1914 – 26 October 2021), 105 years and 343 days: a combined age of 213 years and 274 days)	
William Henry Olive; Vacle P. Olive	25 January 1941	80 years, 295 days	16 November 2021 (William Henry)	Arkansas, United States		
Carlos Machado de Moraes; Julietta (née Almeida) de Moraes	29 August 1915	80 years, 294 days	18 June 1996 (Julietta)	Bom Jesus do Itabapoana, Brazil	Recognized as the first known Brazilian marriage of at least 80 years	
David Meixner; Gretchen Emma (née Mertens) Meixner	18 January 1942	80 years, 282 days	27 October 2022 (Gretchen Emma)	Florida, United States		
Ralph Francis Lumb; Phyllis Mae (née Wetherbee) Lumb	11 February 1941	80 years, 252 days	21 October 2021 (Phyllis Mae)	New York, United States		
Donald Louis Mergler; Margaret Anne (née Beckman) Mergler	4 September 1926	80 years, 233 days	25 April 2007 (Donald Louis)	Maryland, United States		
Floyd Cletus Hall; Betty June (née Hayes) Hall	22 July 1939	80 years, 212 days	19 February 2020 (Floyd Cletus)	Arkansas, United States		
John Swaney Carroll; Gerald Lena "Jerry" (née Griggs) Carroll	18 April 1946	80 years, 211 days		Tennessee, United States	Recognized as the longest marriage in the history of the state	
Donald Niles Hart Sr. Vivian Cornelia (née Brecker) Hart	25 June 1937	80 years, 206 days	17 January 2018 (Donald Niles Sr.)	Michigan, United States		
Timmie Laron Waters; Violet (née Moore) Waters	22 March 1941	80 years, 204 days	9 October 2021 (Violet)	Louisiana, United States	Recognized by the Louisiana Family Forum in 2021	
Ronald Gilbert "Ron" Collings; Esther Elizabeth Collings	19 October 1938	80 years, 187 days	24 April 2019 (Esther Elizabeth)	Adelaide, Australia		
Mel McMullen; Jennifer McMullen	13 May 1946	80 years, 186 days		California, United States		
Willie Chambers; Geraldine Chambers	28 January 1943	80 years, 180 days	27 July 2023 (Willie)	Maryland, United States		
Raymond Taylor; Theresa Taylor	5 June 1946	80 years, 163 days		Ontario, Canada		
Kermit Eastman; Betty (née Swan) Eastman	6 June 1946	80 years, 162 days		Minnesota, United States		
Allen John Frandsen; Evelyn (née Mackay) Frandsen	30 March 1942	80 years, 159 days	5 September 2022 (Allen John)	Utah, United States	Recognized by the Utah governor's office in 2022 as the then-longest marriage in the state	
Michael Robert Vincel Jr. Mildred F. Vincel	10 September 1944	80 years, 154 days	11 February 2025 (Michael Robert Jr.)	Virginia, United States		
Albino Augusto; Leonilda (née Martini) Augusto	28 July 1944	80 years, 147 days	22 December 2024 (Leonilda)	Campo Largo, Brazil		
Joffre Cecil "Jeff" Laurent; Dawn Laurent	3 March 1945	80 years, 140 days	21 July 2025 ("Jeff")	Hawke's Bay, New Zealand		
Luiz Luize; Maria Luiza (née Rossi) Luize	4 July 1946	80 years, 134 days		Cornélio Procópio, Brazil		
Jan Ihnatík; Alžběta Ihnatíková	12 July 1946	80 years, 126 days		Ostrava, Czech Republic		
Leo Dormaier; Vivian Marie (née Blankenship) Dormaier	25 February 1944	80 years, 122 days	26 June 2024 (Vivian Marie)	Washington, United States	Recognized as the longest marriage in the state	
Bill G. Jones; Beatrice "Bea" Jones	23 December 1945	80 years, 116 days	18 April 2026 (Bill G.)	California, United States	Recognized as the longest marriage in the state	
Jón Albert Magnússon; Rita Rona Magnússon	14 July 1940	80 years, 97 days	19 October 2020 (Jón Albert)	Hvidovre, Denmark		
Nicolaas Christiaan "Nico" Cornelisse; Anna (née Breijaen) Cornelisse	16 September 1942	80 years, 66 days	23 November 2022 ("Nico")	Bellingwolde, Netherlands		
Robert Samuel Cornish; Leora Marie (née Wincapaw) Cornish	10 March 1937	80 years, 63 days	12 May 2017 (Robert Samuel)	Wisconsin, United States		
Joseph Marshall Huckaby Jr. Irene Ruby (née Johnson) Huckaby	23 December 1944	80 years, 63 days	24 February 2025 (Joseph Marshall Jr.)	Tennessee, United States		
Henry Willis Hoell Sr. Rosa (née Gurganus) Hoell	28 April 1941	80 years, 49 days	16 June 2021 (Rosa)	North Carolina, United States		
Jack Bare; Joan (née Banks) Bare	3 August 1939	80 years, 38 days	10 September 2019 (Jack)	Codsall, United Kingdom	Previously recognized as Britain's "longest married couple"	
Alan Williams; Joan Williams	20 January 1945	80 years, 33 days	22 February 2025 (Joan)	Hervey Bay, Australia	They both served in the Australian Army in World War II	
Benjamin Franklin "Ben" Hartley; Drusilla Orlena (née Keith) Hartley	24 November 1875	80 years, 32 days	26 December 1955 ("Ben")	Idaho, United States	Recognized as "Nation's Longest Marriage" ever for several years	
Warren Leslie MacQuarrie; Clara Wilma MacQuarrie	15 September 1942	80 years, 31 days	16 October 2022 (Clara Wilma)	California, United States		
Andrew Paul "Andy" Kowalczyk; Bertha "Bunny" (née Burnham) Kowalczyk	1 January 1944	80 years, 30 days	31 January 2024 ("Andy")	Missouri, United States	He was a World War II United States Navy veteran and electrical engineer	
Percy George Arrowsmith; Florence Mary "Flo" (née Dallimore) Arrowsmith	1 June 1925	80 years, 14 days	15 June 2005 (Percy George)	Hereford, United Kingdom	Previously recognized as Britain's "longest married couple"	
Peter Mascolo; Anna (née DiTuccio) Mascolo	23 April 1928	80 years, 9 days	2 May 2008 (Peter)	Connecticut, United States	They were the parents of actor Joseph Mascolo	
Pierre Jean Louis Germain Soulages; Colette Marcelle Léonie (née Llaurens) Soulages	24 October 1942	80 years, 1 day	25 October 2022 (Pierre Jean Louis Germain)	Sète, France	He was an artist whose abstract works are in many modern art museums	
