= Ashok Singh =

Ashok Singh may refer to:

- Ashok Singh (politician, born 1955), member of the Lok Sabha, the lower house of the Parliament of India (1996–1997, 1998–1999)
- Ashok Singh (politician, born 1963), member of the Rajya Sabha
- Ashok Singh Moirangmayum (born 1993), Indian football defender
- Ashok Kumar Singh (disambiguation), several people
- Ashok Veer Vikram Singh (1949–2014), member of the Madhya Pradesh Legislative Assembly
