= Anil Agrawal =

Indian politician

Anil Agarwal

Member of Parliament, Rajya Sabha
- In office 2018–2024
- Preceded by: Mayawati
- Succeeded by: Amarpal Maurya
- Constituency: Uttar Pradesh

Personal details
- Born: 31 October 1962 (age 62); Laksar, Haridwar, Uttar Pradesh (present day Uttarakhand)
- Political party: Bharatiya Janata Party
- Spouse: Deepanjali Agrawal (m. 1987)
- Parents: Harish Chandra (father); Ramkali Devi (mother)
- Education: B.E (Civil), M.B.A
- Alma mater: Bangalore University; SHUATS

Anil Agarwal (born 31 October 1962) is an Indian politician and an MP from the Bharatiya Janata Party from Uttar Pradesh. He was fielded as the ninth candidate in the ten Rajya Sabha seats which went for elections He defeated Mayawati of the BSP who got 35 first preference votes and required a minimum of 37 votes. He had got 22 first preference votes and increased the tally based on second preference votes.
