= Aditi Singh (politician) =

Indian politician (born 1987)

Member of the Uttar Pradesh Legislative Assembly
- Incumbent
- Assumed office 11 March 2017
- Preceded by: Akhilesh Kumar Singh
- Constituency: Rae Bareli

Personal details
- Born: 15 November 1987 (age 38) Lucknow, Uttar Pradesh, India
- Party: Bharatiya Janata Party (2021–present)
- Other political affiliations: Indian National Congress (2017- 2021)
- Spouse: Angad Singh (m. 2019-2023)
- Parent: Akhilesh Kumar Singh (father)
- Education: Duke University
- Occupation: Politician

Aditi Singh (born 15 November 1987) is an Indian politician and a state legislator from Rae Bareli in Uttar Pradesh, India. She is serving as a member of Legislative Assembly (MLA) from the Rae Bareli Sadar constituency of Uttar Pradesh, having won the seat in 2017 and 2022, 18th Uttar Pradesh Assembly. She became one of the youngest MLAs in Uttar Pradesh upon winning her first election in 2017.

She entered electoral politics with the Indian National Congress in 2017, but her views were often at odds with the party, such as her support for the abrogation of Article 370 in 2019. She also expressed support for Prime Minister Modi on several issues of national interest, and subsequently joined the Bharatiya Janata Party (BJP) in 2021. She went on to win the Rae Bareli (Sadar) constituency again in 2022 as a BJP candidate.

== Early life and education ==
She was born into a political family in Uttar Pradesh. Her father Akhilesh Kumar Singh was a five-time representative of Raebareli Sadar seat, and the family has their ancestral home in Lalupur village of Raebareli, Uttar Pradesh.

Aditi did most of her schooling in boarding schools in Mussorie and New Delhi and later went to United States for higher studies but maintained close relations with her family in Uttar Pradesh. She did her Master's in Management Studies (MMS) from Duke University's Fuqua School of Business in the United States before returning to India in 2014. She subsequently stayed in India due to her father's illness and eventually went on to enter politics.

== Career ==
In her first election in 2017, Aditi Singh won the assembly election by a margin of more than 90,000 votes on a Congress ticket. In a case of electoral rivalry turning violent, her vehicle was attacked by henchmen of the local politician, A. P. Singh in May 2019.

In August 2019, she came out in support of the abrogation of Article 370 noting that "It will help in integrating Jammu and Kashmir into mainstream India. It's a historic decision". On 24 November 2021 she officially joined the Bharatiya Janata Party.

In the 2022 UP assembly elections, as BJP candidate, Aditi Singh won the Rae Bareli Sadar seat again, bagging 93,780 votes, defeating Samajwadi Party's Ram Pratap Yadav, who got 86,359 votes, while Manish Singh Chauhan of the Congress got 14,063 votes.

#	From	To	Position	Comments
01	2017	2022	Member, 17th Legislative Assembly	Indian National Congress
02	2022	Incumbent	Member, 18th Legislative Assembly	Bharatiya Janata Party

== Personal life ==
She considers herself to be a spiritual and religious person and welcomed the inauguration of Ram Mandir in Ayodhya. She was married in 2019 to Angad Singh Saini, an MLA in Punjab Legislative Assembly from Nawanshahr constituency, and the couple mutually separated in 2023.
