= Devendra Pratap Singh (UP politician, born 1958) =

Indian politician (born 1958)

Member of Uttar Pradesh Legislative Assembly
- Incumbent
- Assumed office 2022
- Preceded by: Dhirendra Bahadur Singh
- Constituency: Sareni
- In office 2012–2017
- Preceded by: Susil Kumar
- Succeeded by: Dhirendra Bahadur Singh
- Constituency: Sareni
- In office 2002–2007
- Preceded by: Ashok Kumar Singh
- Succeeded by: Ashok Kumar Singh
- Constituency: Sareni

Member of Uttar Pradesh Legislative Council
- In office 1990–1996
- Constituency: Raibareli Local Authorities

Personal details
- Born: 2 May 1958 (age 67) Khajurgaon, Uttar Pradesh, India
- Party: Samajwadi Party
- Spouse: Krishna Singh (m. 1985)
- Children: 2
- Parent: Swyambar Singh (father)
- Profession: Politician

Devendra Pratap Singh (born 2 May 1958) is an Indian politician who is currently serving as a member of the 18th Uttar Pradesh Legislative Assembly. He has represented the Sareni constituency of Raebareli district since 2002. He is a member of the Samajwadi Party.

== Political career ==
Singh previously held the first term MLA in 2002 and second term in 2012 from the Sareni Assembly.

In the following 2022 Uttar Pradesh Legislative Assembly election, Singh won the Sareni seat by defeating Dhirendra Bahadur Singh of the Bharatiya Janata Party with a vote margin of 3807.
