= Rahul Rajpoot =

Indian politician (born 1997)

Rahul Lodhi Rajpoot

Member of the Uttar Pradesh Legislative Assembly
- Incumbent
- Assumed office 2022
- Preceded by: Rakesh Singh
- Constituency: Harchandpur

Personal details
- Born: 1997 (age 27–28); Harchandpur, Rae Bareli district, Uttar Pradesh
- Political party: Samajwadi Party
- Education: Graduation (Babu Jaishankar Gaya Prasad College, Unnao)

Rahul Lodhi Rajpoot (born 1997) is an Indian politician from Uttar Pradesh. He is a member of the Uttar Pradesh Legislative Assembly from Harchandpur Assembly constituency in Rae Bareli district. He won the 2022 Uttar Pradesh Legislative Assembly election representing the Samajwadi Party. He is one of the youngest Member of the Legislative Assembly in Uttar Pradesh.

== Early life and education ==
Rajpoot is from Harchandpur, Rae Bareli district, Uttar Pradesh. He is the son of Shiv Ganesh Lodhi. He completed his graduation in 2017 at Babu Jaishankar Gaya Prasad College, Unnao, which if affiliated with Chhatrapati Shahu Ji Maharaj University, Kanpur.

== Career ==
Rajpoot won from Harchandpur Assembly constituency representing Samajwadi Party in the 2022 Uttar Pradesh Legislative Assembly election. He polled 92,498 votes and defeated his nearest rival, Rakesh Singh of the Bharatiya Janata Party, by a margin of 14,489 votes.
