= College of Physicians & Surgeons of Mumbai =

Postgraduate Medical Examination Board in India

College of Physicians and Surgeons of Mumbai
- Abbreviation: CPS Mumbai
- Established: 1912; 114 years ago
- Founder: H.W. Stevenson
- President: Dr. Ajay D. Sambre (DOMS, FCPS)
- Website: www.cpsmumbai.org

College of Physicians & Surgeons of Mumbai (CPS Mumbai) is a post-graduate educational institute in Mumbai, India, established in 1912. It provides postgraduate medical education, offering 10 Fellowship & 17 Diploma courses. The college is located close to King Edward Memorial Hospital, and trains doctors from across India. The qualifications granted by CPS Mumbai allow practitioners to register themselves as specialists, upon completing the tenure of 2 years Diploma or 3 years Fellowship and passing the exit examination.

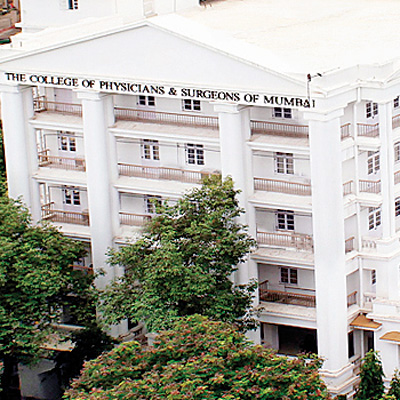
CPS House, Parel

== History ==
In 1912, through the Governor-General of India, the British Government approved the establishment of a postgraduate medical institution, as a sister institute to the Royal College of Surgeons in London. Dr. Rajab Ali Patel agreed to establish the College of Physicians and Surgeons, dropping the word 'Royal' from the name. On 21 April 1912, a committee meeting was called to discuss the proposal to form a college, which was passed unanimously. The college was established as a Registered Society, under the Societies Registration Act, 1860, with documents signed to that effect on 4 March 1913.

Surgeon General H W. Stevenson was unanimously elected as the founding president, with Dr. Temulji B. Nariman and Col. C. H. L. Meyer elected as vice-presidents. The college committee converted itself into the first council of the college, before drafting and unanimously passing a constitution.

CPS functions as an examining body and provides affiliations to different district and private hospitals and medical colleges.

CPS Mumbai has been offering various fellowship and diploma courses at the postgraduate level to meet the shortage of specialist doctors in India. It is the only examining body besides the National Board of Examinations in Medical Sciences (NBEMS) to have been recognized by the Ministry of Health and Family Welfare to impart postgraduate medical education.

The college was recognised until July 2024 to grant specialist qualifications (Fellowship & Diploma) in the specialties of Medicine, Surgery, Midwifery & Gynaecology, Dermatology, Pathology, Ophthalmology and Child Health which were recognised by the National Medical Commission of India. For a brief period between 2017 and 2018, it granted specialist qualifications (Diploma) in other specialties such as Orthopaedics, Anaesthesiology, Radiology & Electrology, Public Health, Tuberculosis Diseases, Oto-Rhino-Laryngology, Psychological Medicine, Transfusion Medicine and Family Planning which were recognised nationally by the National Medical Commission of India.

At its peak, it had around 1,600 doctors pursuing specialization under its ambit. CPS is said to have granted almost 45,000 doctors over its 110-year history with diploma or fellowship qualifications allowing them to register themselves as specialists. Currently, CPS Mumbai is recognised by various State Governments of India to grant specialist qualifications with validity confined to only those states or union territories.

== Administration office ==
CPS is situated in the prime locality of Mumbai near KEM Hospital, Parel, and its office comprises an area of approximately 80,000 sq. feet in a five-storied building having different departments. The CPS has four lecture halls and four examination halls, which accommodates approximately 500 students.

== Fellowship and diploma ==
College of Physicians and Surgeons of Mumbai offers 3-year fellowship and 2-year diploma courses. Both courses are full-time stipendiary hospital positions allowing the holder an entry onto the specialist register.

Various fellowship courses offered by CPS (3-year Specialist Training Course)

Course	Course name
FCPS(MED)	FCPS-Medicine
FCPS(SURG)	FCPS-Surgery
FCPS(MID-GY)	FCPS-Midwifery & Gynaecology
FCPS(OPTHL)	FCPS-Ophthalmology
FCPS(CH)	FCPS-Child Health
FCPS(DERMT)	FCPS-Dermatology and Venereology
FCPS(ORL)	FCPS-Oto-Rhino-Laryngology
FCPS(ORTHO)	FCPS-Orthopaedics
FCPS(ANAES)	FCPS-Anaesthesiology
FCPS(PATHO)	FCPS-Pathology

Various Diploma Courses offered by CPS (2-year Specialist Training Course)

Course	Course name
DGO	Diploma in Gynaecology and Obstetrics
DCH	Diploma in Child Health
DPB	Diploma in Pathology and Bacteriology
D.ORTHO	Diploma in Orthopaedics
DMRE	Diploma in Medical Radiology and Electrology
DDV	Diploma in Dermatology and Venereology
DOMS	Diploma in Ophthalmic Medicine and Surgery
DORL	Diploma in Oto-Rhino-Laryngology
TDD	Diploma in Tuberculosis Diseases
DA	Diploma in Anaesthesiology
DPM	Diploma in Psychological Medicine
DGM	Diploma in General Medicine
DGS	Diploma in General Surgery
DTMH	Diploma in Tropical Medicine and Hygiene
DTM	Diploma in Transfusion Medicine
DPH	Diploma in Public Health
DFP	Diploma in Family Planning

== Certificate ==
Certificate Courses: These were 1-year training programmes designed to be imparted at post MBBS level. They were recognised as specialist medical qualifications by the Gujarat Medical Council. However, no post MBBS certificate course was recognised by National Medical Commission/Medical Council of India as a specialist qualification. Enrollment into the Certificate Courses has ceased since 2019.

Course	Course name
C-DIAB	Certificate in Diabetology
C-HIV	Certificate in HIV/AIDS

== State Medical Council recognition ==
Various Diploma, Fellowship and Certificate Courses are recognised by different Indian States which allow the holders to practice as specialists in those states, namely

1. Maharashtra Medical Council (MMC) vide GR Extraordinary 4-B dated 15 March 2010 through notification no. PGM.1010/CR-18 (Part 2)/ 10/EDU-2 read with the MMC Act 1965. The qualifications are recognised only for candidates possessing CPS qualifications when granted either before 14 July 2023; or if enrolled before 14 July 2023. All non NMC recognised CPS qualifications are not valid in the state of Maharashtra if enrolled after 14 July 2023.

2. Gujarat Medical Council (GMC) vide GR no. MCG/10/2011/460646/J dated 26 August 2011, provided the candidate is a domicile of the State of Gujarat.

3. Rajasthan Medical Council (RMC) since 2016, provided the entire course of Diploma or Fellowship is completed within the state of Rajasthan. The state ceased any new admissions after 2018.

4. Union Territory of Dadra & Nagar Haveli and Daman & Diu.

Such recognition has sometimes been controversial.

== National recognition ==
MCPS, FCPS (Medicine), FCPS (Surgery), FCPS (Midwifery & Gynaecology), FCPS (Ophthalmology), FCPS (Dermatology & Venereology), FCPS (Pathology), DGO, DCH and DPB qualifications granted by College of Physicians and Surgeons of Mumbai were recognised since its Inception in 1913. However, in December 2009, the Union Ministry of Health and Family Welfare derecognised qualifications granted by the College of Physicians and Surgeons owing to a lack of infrastructure and faculty required to run the courses.

Ministry of Health and Family Welfare, New Delhi (MoHFW) in the Notification dated October 17, 2017, recognised all the PG diploma courses (DGO, DCH, DPB, D.ORTHO, DMRE, DDV, DTMH, DOMS, DA, TDD, DORL, DGM, DGS, DFP, DPM, DTM, DFP, DEME along with Super-speciality Diploma Courses) offered by the College of Physicians & Surgeons of Mumbai after an extensive review of the courses and based on recommendations of PG Medical Education Committee spearheaded by Dr Devi Shetty with the following note,

(i) All the admissions should be through NEET PG and centralised counselling and as per Government policy from time to time. (ii) The CPS qualifications shall not be treated as a recognised medical qualification for the purpose of teaching. (iii) Further, any postgraduate degree course to be run by the CPS shall be with the prior approval of this Ministry subject to fulfillment of stipulations prescribed on the lines of Minimum Standard Requirement Regulations of MCI.

Four months after the Union Ministry of Health and Family Welfare had recognised all PG diplomas granted by the College of Physicians and Surgeons, the same ministry derecognised all of them except DGO, DCH and DPB, by a notification published on January 22, 2018. They added 6 Fellowship courses to the list of courses recognised by the Medical Council of India. Therefore, only three PG Diplomas and six Fellowships granted by CPS were recognised by the Medical Council of India (MCI)/National Medical Commission (NMC) . However, this notification didn't affect the recognition status of candidates who enrolled themselves in PG Diploma Courses offered by CPS Mumbai between October 2017 and February 2018. All the Broad Specialty PG Diploma holders (D.ORTHO, DMRE, DDV, DOMS, DORL, DPM, DTMH, DTM, DA, TDD, DTM, DFP, DPH, DGM, DGS) of this interim period continue to be recognised as specialists.

The Postgraduate Medical Education Board of NMC in its meeting held on 16.7.2024, decided to discontinue recognition for all CPS courses. Therefore, any admission into any PG Diploma or Fellowship courses of CPS Mumbai after 16.7.2024 stands non recognised by the National Medical Commission.
