= Feroze Gandhi =

Indian independence activist, politician and journalist (1912 – 1960)

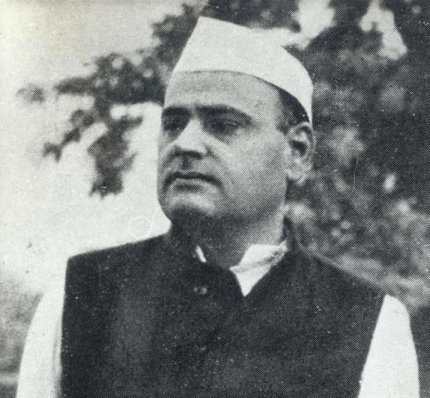
- Gandhi before 1950

Member of Parliament, Lok Sabha
- In office 17 April 1952 – 4 April 1957
- Preceded by: Constituency established
- Succeeded by: Himself
- Constituency: Rae Bareli (previously Pratapgarh District (west)-Rae Bareli district)

Member of Parliament, Lok Sabha
- In office 5 May 1957 – 8 September 1960
- Succeeded by: Baij Nath Kureel
- Constituency: Rae Bareli
- Preceded by: Himself

Personal details
- Born: 12 September 1912 Bombay, Bombay Presidency, British Raj (present-day Mumbai, Maharashtra, India)
- Died: 8 September 1960 (aged 47) New Delhi, Union Territory of Delhi, India
- Cause of death: Heart attack
- Resting place: Parsi cemetery, Prayagraj
- Party: Indian National Congress
- Spouse: Indira Gandhi (m. 1942)
- Children: Rajiv Gandhi (son); Sanjay Gandhi (son)
- Relatives: See Nehru–Gandhi family
- Education: Ewing Christian College (dropped out)
- Occupation: Politician

Feroze Jehangir Gandhi (12 September 1912 – 8 September 1960) was an Indian independence activist, politician and journalist. He served as a member of the provincial parliament between 1950 and 1952, and later a member of the Lok Sabha, the Lower house of Indian parliament. He published The National Herald and The Navjivan newspapers. His wife, Indira Gandhi (daughter of Jawaharlal Nehru, the first Prime Minister of India), and their elder son Rajiv Gandhi were both prime ministers of India. He was a member of the Indian National Congress.

== Early life and education ==
Feroze Gandhi was born on 12 September 1912 to a Parsi family at the Tehmulji Nariman Hospital in the Fort district of Bombay; his parents, Jehangir Faredoon Ghandy and Ratimai (née Commissariat), lived in Nauroji Natakwala Bhawan in Khetwadi Mohalla in Bombay. His father Jehangir was a marine engineer working for Killick Nixon and was later promoted as a warrant engineer.

Feroze was the youngest of the five children with two brothers Dorab and Faridun Jehangir, and two sisters, Tehmina Kershasp and Aloo Dastur. The family had migrated to Bombay from Bharuch (now in South Gujarat) where their ancestral home, which belonged to his grandfather, still exists in Kotpariwad. In the early 1920s, after the death of his father, Feroze and his mother moved to Allahabad to live with his unmarried maternal aunt, Shirin Commissariat, a surgeon at the city's Lady Dufferin Hospital.

Feroze attended the Vidya Mandir High School, and then the British-staffed Ewing Christian College, Prayagraj. Later, in 1935, he went to London to complete his education at the London School of Economics and obtained a B.Sc. degree.

== Family and career ==
In 1930, the wing of Congress Freedom fighters, the Vanar Sena was formed. Feroze met Kamala Nehru and Indira among the women demonstrators picketing outside Ewing Christian College. Kamala fainted from the sun's heat and Feroze went to look after her. The next day, he abandoned his studies to join the Indian independence movement.

He was imprisoned in 1930, along with Lal Bahadur Shastri (head of Allahabad District Congress Committee, later second Prime Minister of India) and detained in Faizabad Jail for nineteen months over his participation in the independence movement. Soon after his release, he was involved with the agrarian no-rent campaign in the United Province (now Uttar Pradesh) and was imprisoned twice, in 1932 and 1933, while working closely with Nehru.

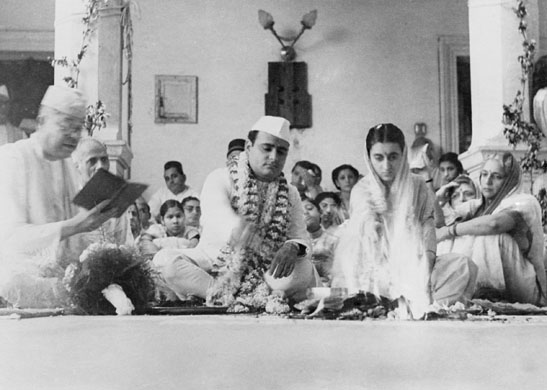
The marriage ceremony of Feroze Gandhi and Indira Nehru at Anand Bhavan, on 26 March 1942. In 1984, a photograph of the wedding was used in court to show that the ceremony followed Hindu, and not Parsi, rituals.

Feroze first proposed to Indira in 1933, but she and her mother rejected it, as she was still sixteen. Feroze grew close to the Nehru family, especially to Indira's mother Kamala Nehru, accompanying her to the TB sanatorium at Bhowali in 1934, helping arrange her trip to Europe when her condition worsened in April 1935, and visiting her at the sanatorium at Badenweiler and finally at Lausanne, where he was at her bedside when she died on 28 February 1936. In the following years in England, Indira and Feroze grew closer. They married in March 1942 according to Adi Dharam Hindu rituals.

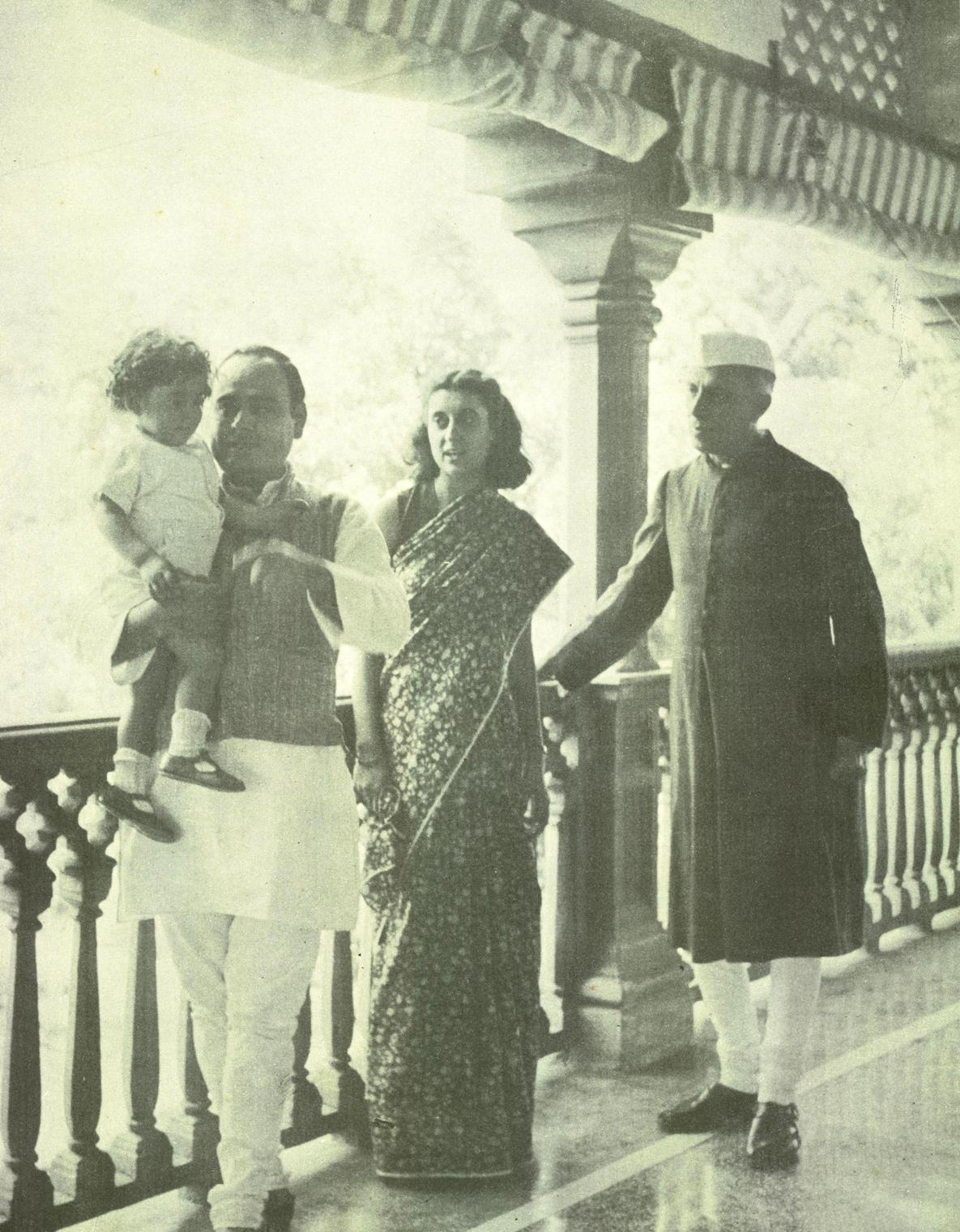
Rajiv, Feroze, Indira Gandhi and Nehru at Anand Bhawan, 1945

The couple was arrested and jailed in August 1942, during the Quit India Movement less than six months after their marriage. Feroze was imprisoned for a year in Allahabad's Naini Central Prison. The following five years were of comfortable domestic life and the couple had two sons, Rajiv and Sanjay, born in 1944 and 1946, respectively.

After independence, Jawaharlal became the first Prime Minister of India. Feroze and Indira settled in Allahabad with their two young children, and Feroze became managing director of The National Herald, a newspaper founded by his father-in-law, Jawaharlal Nehru.

After being a member of the provincial parliament (1950–1952), Feroze won a seat in independent India's first general elections in 1952, for the Rae Bareli constituency in Uttar Pradesh. Indira travelled from Delhi and worked as his campaign organizer. Feroze soon became a prominent force in his own right, criticizing the government of his father-in-law and beginning a fight against corruption.

In the years after independence, many Indian business houses had become close to the political leaders, and some of them resulted in various financial irregularities. In a case exposed by Feroze in December 1955, he revealed how Ram Kishan Dalmia, as chairman of a bank and an insurance company, used these companies to fund his takeover of Bennett and Coleman and started laundering money from publicly held companies for personal benefit.

In 1957, he was re-elected from Rae Bareli. In the parliament in 1958, he raised the Haridas Mundhra scandal involving the government controlled Life Insurance Corporation of India (LIC). This revelation eventually led to the resignation of the Finance Minister T. T. Krishnamachari.

Feroze also initiated a number of nationalization drives, starting with LIC. At one point he also suggested that TATA Engineering and Locomotive Company (TELCO) be nationalized since they were charging nearly double the price of a Japanese railway engine. This raised a stir in the Parsi community since the Tatas were Parsi. He continued challenging the government on a number of other issues, and emerged as a parliamentarian well-respected on both sides of the bench.

== Death and legacy ==
Feroze suffered a heart attack in 1958. Indira, who stayed with her father at Teen Murti House, the official residence of the prime minister, was at that time away on a state visit to Bhutan. She returned to look after him in Kashmir. Feroze died in 1960 at the Willingdon Hospital in Delhi, after suffering a second heart attack. He was cremated and his ashes interred at the Parsi cemetery in Allahabad.

His Rae Bareli Lok Sabha constituency seat was held by his wife, Indira Gandhi from 1967 to 1976 and his future daughter-in-law, and wife of Rajiv Gandhi, Sonia Gandhi from 2004 to 2024, followed by his grandson Rahul from 2024.

A school of higher education that he helped found was named after him in Rae Bareli. NTPC Limited renamed their Unchahar Thermal Power Station in Uttar Pradesh to Feroze Gandhi Unchahar Thermal Power Plant.
