= Akhilesh Kumar Singh =

Indian politician (1959–2019)

Member of the Legislative Assembly for Rae Bareli
- In office 1993–2017
- Preceded by: Ashok Kumar Singh
- Succeeded by: Aditi Singh
- Constituency: Rae Bareli Sadar

Personal details
- Born: 15 September 1959 Raebareli, Uttar Pradesh, India
- Died: 20 August 2019 (aged 59) Lucknow, Uttar Pradesh, India
- Party: Peace Party of India
- Other political affiliations: Indian National Congress
- Children: Aditi Singh
- Education: Feroze Gandhi College, Kanpur University
- Occupation: Politician

Akhilesh Kumar Singh (15 September 1959 – 20 August 2019) was an Indian politician.

Akhilesh Singh was born on 15 September 1959. Singh was first elected to the Uttar Pradesh Legislative Assembly in 1993 as an Indian National Congress candidate from Rae Bareli Sadar. Singh won reelection twice, in 1996 and 2002, while retaining his affiliation with Congress. Expelled from Congress prior to the 2007 election, Singh ran as a political independent and won a fourth legislative term. Singh contested the 2012 election after joining the Peace Party of India. Upon the completion of his fifth legislative term, Singh's daughter Aditi announced that she would contest her father's open seat in 2017, which she won on Congress ticket.

In later life, Singh was diagnosed with cancer, and died of the disease while seeking treatment at the Sanjay Gandhi Postgraduate Institute of Medical Sciences on 20 August 2019.
