= Manoj Kumar Pandey (politician) =

Indian politician

Member of the Uttar Pradesh legislative assembly
- Incumbent
- Assumed office 8 March 2012
- Constituency: Unchahar

Personal details
- Born: 15 April 1968 (age 58) Raebareli, Uttar Pradesh, India
- Party: Bharatiya Janata Party (2024-Present)
- Other political affiliations: Samajwadi Party (2012-2024)
- Education: Feroze Gandhi College, Kanpur University

Manoj Kumar Pandey is an Indian politician and cabinet minister of Uttar Pradesh from Bharatiya Janata Party. He represents Raebareli district's Unchahar in the Uttar Pradesh Legislative Assembly.

Manoj Kumar Pandey was expelled from Samajwadi Party on 23 June 2025 for working against party principles and supporting the BJP in the Rajya Sabha elections. He later joined the BJP.

== Early life and education ==
He was born in Raebareli. He completed his graduation from Feroze Gandhi College (Kanpur University). He was awarded honorary doctorate in Social Sciences from Sam Higginbottom Institute of Agriculture, Technology and Sciences in 2013.
