= List of Rajya Sabha members from Odisha =

The Rajya Sabha or Council of States, is the upper house of the Parliament of India. Odisha elects 10 seats and they are indirectly elected by the state legislators of Odisha. The number of seats allocated to the party, are determined by the number of seats a party possesses during nomination and the party nominates a member to be voted on. Elections within the state legislatures are held using Single transferable vote with proportional representation.

== Current members ==
Keys: BJD (5) BJP (5)

#	Name	Party	Term start	Term end
1	Subhashish Khuntia	BJD	04-Apr-2024	03-Apr-2030
2	Debashish Samantaray	BJP	18-Jun-2026	03-Apr-2030
3	Sasmit Patra	BJD	02-Jul-2022	01-Jul-2028
4	Sulata Deo	BJD	02-Jul-2022	01-Jul-2028
5	Manas Mangaraj	BJD	02-Jul-2022	01-Jul-2028
6	Santrupta Mishra	BJD	03-Apr-2026	02-Apr-2032
7	Dilip Ray	BJP	03-April-2026	02-April-2032
8	Manmohan Samal	BJP	03-April-2026	02-April-2032
9	Sujeet Kumar	BJP	03-April-2026	02-April-2032
10	Ashwini Vaishnaw	BJP	04-Apr-2024	03-Apr-2030

== Chronological list of all members from Odisha ==
represents current members

Name	Party	Term start	Term end	Term	Notes
Debashish Samantaray	BJP	18-Jun-2026	03-Apr-2030	2	defected from BJD
Manmohan Samal	BJP	03-Apr-2026	02-Apr-2032	1	
Sujeet Kumar	BJP	03-Apr-2026	02-Apr-2032	3	
Dilip Ray	BJP	03-Apr-2026	02-Apr-2032	3	
Santrupta Mishra	BJD	03-Apr-2026	02-Apr-2032	1	
Sujeet Kumar	BJP	13-Dec-2024	02-Apr-2026	2	defected from BJD
Mamata Mohanta	BJP	28-Aug-2024	02-Apr-2026	2	defected from BJD
Subhashish Khuntia	BJD	04-Apr-2024	03-Apr-2030	1	
Debashish Samantaray	BJD	04-Apr-2024	28-May-2026	1	defected to BJP
Ashwini Vaishnaw	BJP	04-Apr-2024	03-Apr-2030	2	
Sasmit Patra	BJD	02-Jul-2022	01-Jul-2028	2	
Sulata Deo	BJD	02-Jul-2022	01-Jul-2028	1	
Manas Mangaraj	BJD	02-Jul-2022	01-Jul-2028	1	
Niranjan Bishi	BJD	07-Jun-2022	02-Apr-2026	1	bye - resignation of Subhash Chandra Singh
Sujeet Kumar	BJD	03-Apr-2020	06-Sep-2024	1	defected to BJP
Mamata Mohanta	BJD	03-Apr-2020	31-Jul-2024	1	defected to BJP
Munna Khan	BJD	03-Apr-2020	02-Apr-2026	1	
Subhash Chandra Singh	BJD	03-Apr-2020	21-Apr-2022	1	resigned
Sasmit Patra	BJD	29-Jun-2019	01-Jul-2022	1	bye - resignation of Pratap Keshari Deb
Amar Patnaik	BJD	29-Jun-2019	03-Apr-2024	1	bye - resignation of Soumya Ranjan Patnaik
Ashwini Vaishnaw	BJP	29-Jun-2019	03-Apr-2024	1	bye - resignation of Achyuta Samanta
Prashanta Nanda	BJD	04-Apr-2018	03-Apr-2024	1	
Achyuta Samanta	BJD	04-Apr-2018	24-May-2019	1	elected to Kandhamal Lok Sabha
Soumya Ranjan Patnaik	BJD	04-Apr-2018	09-Jun-2019	1	elected to Khandapada Assembly
Pratap Keshari Deb	BJD	19-May-2017	09-Jun-2019	1	elected to Aul Assembly bye - resignation of Bishnu Charan Das
N. Bhaskar Rao	BJD	02-Jul-2016	01-Jul-2022	1	
Prasanna Acharya	BJD	02-Jul-2016	01-Jul-2022	1	
Bishnu Charan Das	BJD	02-Jul-2016	21-Mar-2017	1	resigned
Narendra Kumar Swain	BJD	07-Dec-2015	02-Apr-2020	1	bye - death of Kalpataru Das
Ananga Udaya Singh Deo	BJD	26-Jun-2014	03-Apr-2018	2	bye - resignation of Rabinarayan Mohapatra
Bhupinder Singh	BJD	26-Jun-2014	01-Jul-2016	1	bye - resignation of Shashi Bhusan Behera
Anubhav Mohanty	BJD	13-Jun-2014	24-May-2019	1	elected to Kendrapara Lok Sabha
Sarojini Hembram	BJD	03-Apr-2014	02-Apr-2020	1	
Ananga Udaya Singh Deo	BJD	03-Apr-2014	17-Apr-2014	1	
Kalpataru Das	BJD	03-Apr-2014	25-Jul-2015	1	death
Ranjib Biswal	INC	03-Apr-2014	02-Apr-2020	1	
Dilip Tirkey	BJD	04-Apr-2012	03-Apr-2018	1	
Rabinarayan Mohapatra	BJD	04-Apr-2012	30-May-2014	1	elected to Ranpur Assembly
A. V. Swamy	Ind	04-Apr-2012	03-Apr-2018	1	
Baishnab Charan Parida	BJD	02-Jul-2010	01-Jul-2016	1	
Shashi Bhusan Behera	BJD	02-Jul-2010	28-May-2014	1	elected to Jayadev Assembly
Pyarimohan Mohapatra	Ind	02-Jul-2010	01-Jul-2016	2	
Kishore Kumar Mohanty	BJD	06-Aug-2009	03-Apr-2012	1	bye - resignation of Baijayant Panda
Renubala Pradhan	BJD	03-Apr-2008	02-Apr-2014	1	
Mangala Kisan	BJD	03-Apr-2008	02-Apr-2014	1	
Balbir Punj	BJP	03-Apr-2008	02-Apr-2014	1	
Ramachandra Khuntia	INC	03-Apr-2008	02-Apr-2014	2	
Baijayant Panda	BJD	04-Apr-2006	16-May-2009	2	elected to Kendrapara Lok Sabha
Rudra Narayan Pany	BJP	04-Apr-2006	03-Apr-2012	2	
Sushila Tiriya	INC	04-Apr-2006	03-Apr-2012	2	
Bhagirathi Majhi	BJP	24-Mar-2006	01-Jul-2010	1	bye - disqulaification of Chhatrapal Singh Lodha
Pyarimohan Mohapatra	BJD	02-Jul-2004	01-Jul-2010	1	
Chhatrapal Singh Lodha	BJP	02-Jul-2004	23-Dec-2005	1	disqualified
Radhakant Nayak	INC	02-Jul-2004	01-Jul-2010	1	
Rudra Narayan Pany	BJP	24-Jun-2004	03-Apr-2006	1	bye - resignation of Manmohan Samal
Pramila Bohidar	BJD	03-Apr-2002	02-Apr-2008	1	
Sushree Devi	BJD	03-Apr-2002	02-Apr-2008	1	
Surendra Lath	BJP	03-Apr-2002	02-Apr-2008	1	
Dilip Ray	Ind	03-Apr-2002	02-Apr-2008	2	
Birabhadra Singh	BJD	04-Apr-2000	03-Apr-2006	1	
Baijayant Panda	BJD	04-Apr-2000	03-Apr-2006	1	
Manmohan Samal	BJP	04-Apr-2000	23-May-2004	1	elected to Dhamnagar Assembly
Ranganath Misra	INC	02-Jul-1998	01-Jul-2004	1	
M. N. Das	INC	02-Jul-1998	01-Jul-2004	1	
Ramachandra Khuntia	INC	02-Jul-1998	01-Jul-2004	1	
Frida Topno	INC	07-Apr-1998	02-Apr-2002	1	bye - resignation of Jayanti Patnaik
Ananta Sethi	INC	03-Apr-1996	02-Apr-2002	1	
Maurice Kujur	INC	03-Apr-1996	02-Apr-2002	1	
Jayanti Patnaik	INC	03-Apr-1996	03-Mar-1998	1	elected to Berhampur Lok Sabha
Dilip Ray	JD	03-Apr-1996	02-Apr-2002	1	
Rahasbihari Barik	JD	03-Apr-1994	02-Apr-2000	1	
Sanatan Bisi	JD	03-Apr-1994	02-Apr-2000	1	
Bhagaban Majhi	JD	03-Apr-1994	02-Apr-2000	1	
Ila Panda	JD	02-Jul-1992	01-Jul-1998	1	
Narendra Pradhan	JD	02-Jul-1992	01-Jul-1998	1	
S. R. Bommai	JD	02-Jul-1992	02-Apr-1998	1	elected to Rajya Sabha from Karnataka
Basant Kumar Das	JD	03-Apr-1990	02-Apr-1996	1	
Mira Das	JD	03-Apr-1990	02-Apr-1996	1	
Sarada Mohanty	JD	03-Apr-1990	02-Apr-1996	1	
Pravat Kumar Samantaray	JD	03-Apr-1990	02-Apr-1996	1	
Baikunatha Nath Sahu	INC	07-Oct-1988	02-Apr-1990	1	bye - death of K. Vasudeva Panicker
Kanhu Charan Lenka	INC	03-Apr-1988	02-Apr-1994	1	
Manmohan Mathur	INC	03-Apr-1988	02-Apr-1994	1	
Santosh Kumar Sahu	INC	03-Apr-1988	02-Apr-1994	3	
Jagadish Jani	INC	02-Jul-1986	01-Jul-1992	2	
Basudeb Mohapatra	INC	02-Jul-1986	28-Oct-1990	1	death
Sushila Tiriya	INC	02-Jul-1986	01-Jul-1992	1	
Ganeshwar Kusum	INC	03-Apr-1984	02-Apr-1990	1	
Subas Mohanty	INC	03-Apr-1984	02-Apr-1990	1	
K. Vasudeva Panicker	INC	03-Apr-1984	03-May-1988	1	death
Sunil Kumar Pattnaik	INC	03-Apr-1984	02-Apr-1990	1	
Banamali Babu	INC	03-Apr-1982	02-Apr-1988	1	
Santosh Kumar Sahu	INC	03-Apr-1982	02-Apr-1988	2	
Gaya Chand Bhuyan	JP	03-Apr-1982	02-Apr-1988	1	
Akshay Panda	INC	02-Jul-1980	01-Jul-1986	1	
Jagadish Jani	INC	02-Jul-1980	01-Jul-1986	1	
Shyam Sundar Mohapatra	Ind	02-Jul-1980	01-Jul-1986	1	
Dhaneswar Majhi	JP	03-Apr-1978	02-Apr-1984	1	
Harekrushna Mallick	JP	03-Apr-1978	02-Apr-1984	1	
Bhabani Charan Pattanayak	JP	03-Apr-1978	02-Apr-1984	3	
Surendra Mohanty	INC	03-Apr-1978	02-Apr-1984	2	
Patitpaban Pradhan	JP	13-Jul-1977	02-Apr-1982	1	bye - resignation of Nilamani Routray
Narasingha Prasad Nanda	INC	03-Apr-1976	02-Apr-1982	1	
Santosh Kumar Sahu	INC	03-Apr-1976	02-Apr-1982	1	
Nilamani Routray	JP	03-Apr-1976	26-Jun-1977	1	
Bhairab Chandra Mahanti	INC	03-Apr-1974	02-Apr-1980	1	
Rabi Ray	UC	03-Apr-1974	02-Apr-1980	1	
Lakshmana Mahapatro	CPI	03-Apr-1974	02-Apr-1980	1	
Debananda Amat	INC	06-Mar-1973	02-Apr-1974	1	bye - resignation of Nandini Satpathy
Chaitanya Prasad Majhi	INC	03-Apr-1972	02-Apr-1978	1	
Saraswati Pradhan	INC	03-Apr-1972	02-Apr-1978	1	
Brahmananda Panda	INC	03-Apr-1972	02-Apr-1978	2	
Lokanath Misra	SWA	03-Apr-1972	02-Apr-1978	3	
Kamakhya Prasad Singh Deo	SWA	28-Jan-1972	02-Apr-1976	1	bye - resignation of Surajmal Saha
Biju Patnaik	UC	13-May-1971	06-Oct-1971	1	bye - resignation of Banka Behary Das
Bira Kesari Deo	SWA	03-Apr-1970	02-Apr-1976	2	
Surajmal Saha	SWA	03-Apr-1970	13-Sep-1971	1	death
Binoy Kumar Mahanti	INC	03-Apr-1970	02-Apr-1976	2	
Krishna Chandra Panda	SWA	03-Apr-1968	02-Apr-1974	1	
Sundarmani Patel	SWA	03-Apr-1968	02-Apr-1974	2	
Nandini Satpathy	INC	03-Apr-1968	29-Nov-1972	2	resigned
Brahmananda Panda	INC	30-Nov-1967	02-Apr-1972	1	bye - resignation of Haneef Mahammed
Bira Kesari Deo	SWA	19-Apr-1967	02-Apr-1970	1	bye - death of Shankar Pratap Singh Deb
Bhabani Charan Pattanayak	INC	03-Apr-1966	02-Apr-1972	2	
Haneef Mahammed	INC	03-Apr-1966	06-Oct-1967	1	
Lokanath Misra	SWA	03-Apr-1966	02-Apr-1972	2	
Banka Behary Das	PSP	03-Apr-1966	04-Apr-1971	1	elected to Dharmasala Assembly
Narayan Patra	INC	03-Apr-1964	02-Apr-1970	1	
Binoy Kumar Mahanti	INC	03-Apr-1964	02-Apr-1970	1	
Shankar Pratap Singh Deb	SWA	03-Apr-1964	03-Aug-1965	1	death
Satyanand Mishra	INC	07-Apr-1962	02-Apr-1964	1	bye - resignation of Bibudhendra Mishra
Nandini Satpathy	INC	03-Apr-1962	02-Apr-1968	1	
Manmathnath Misra	INC	03-Apr-1962	02-Apr-1968	1	
Sundarmani Patel	SWA	03-Apr-1962	02-Apr-1968	1	
Bhabani Charan Pattanayak	INC	29-Aug-1961	02-Apr-1966	1	bye - resignation of Bishwanath Das
Dhananjoy Mohanty	INC	22-Aug-1961	02-Apr-1964	1	bye - resignation of Harihar Patel
Nanda Kishore Das	INC	03-Apr-1960	02-Apr-1966	1	
Bishwanath Das	INC	03-Apr-1960	22-Jun-1961	2	elected to Kodala West Assembly
Lokanath Misra	SWA	03-Apr-1960	02-Apr-1966	1	
Bairagi Dwibedy	SWA	03-Apr-1960	02-Apr-1966	1	
Ghasiram Sandil	INC	05-May-1959	02-Apr-1960	1	bye - death of Prafulla Chandra Bhanj Deo
Bibudhendra Mishra	INC	03-Apr-1958	27-Feb-1962	1	elected to Puri Lok Sabha
Harihar Patel	GP	03-Apr-1958	28-Jun-1961	1	elected to Sundargarh Assembly
Dibakar Patnaik	PSP	03-Apr-1958	02-Apr-1964	1	
Lingaraj Misra	INC	27-Apr-1957	19-Dec-1957	1	death bye - resignation of Surendra Mohanty
Bhubanananda Das	INC	27-Apr-1957	02-Apr-1958	1	bye - resignation of Radhakrishna Biswasroy
Govind Chandra Misra	INC	06-Dec-1956	02-Apr-1960	1	
Bhagirathi Mahapatra	INC	03-Apr-1956	02-Apr-1962	1	
Maheshwar Naik	INC	03-Apr-1956	27-Feb-1962	1	elected to Mayurbhanj Lok Sabha
Abhimanyu Rath	GP	03-Apr-1956	02-Apr-1962	1	
Swapnananda Panigrahi	INC	03-Apr-1954	02-Apr-1960	1	
Bishwanath Das	INC	03-Apr-1954	02-Apr-1960	1	
Prafulla Chandra Bhanj Deo	GP	03-Apr-1954	05-Mar-1959	2	death
Bodhram Dubey	INC	03-Apr-1952	02-Apr-1958	1	
Radhakrishna Biswasroy	INC	03-Apr-1952	01-Apr-1957	1	elected to Umerkote Assembly
Surendra Mohanty	GP	03-Apr-1952	23-Mar-1957	1	elected to Dhenkanal Lok Sabha
Jagannath Das	INC	03-Apr-1952	02-Apr-1956	1	
Sunder Mohan Hemrom	INC	03-Apr-1952	02-Apr-1956	1	
Surendranath Dwivedy	SP	03-Apr-1952	02-Apr-1956	1	
Sailabala Das	INC	03-Apr-1952	02-Apr-1954	1	
Prafulla Chandra Bhanj Deo	GP	03-Apr-1952	02-Apr-1954	1	
Baidyanath Rath	CPI	03-Apr-1952	02-Apr-1954	1	
