= 1990 Rajya Sabha elections =

Elections for the Upper House of Indian Parliament

(of 228 seats) to the Rajya Sabha

	First party	Second party
Leader	M. S. Gurupadaswamy	P. Shiv Shankar
Party	Janata Dal	INC

Rajya Sabha elections were held in 1990, to elect members of the Rajya Sabha, Indian Parliament's upper chamber.

== Elections ==
Elections were held in 1990 to elect members from various states. The list is incomplete.

=== Members elected ===
The following members are elected in the elections held in 1990. They are members for the term 1990-96 and retire in year 1996, except in case of the resignation or death before the term.

=== Andhra Pradesh ===
#	Candidate	Party	Term start
1	T. Chandrasekhar Reddy	INC	10-Apr-1990
2	R. K. Dhawan	INC	10-Apr-1990
3	Pragada Kotaiah	INC	10-Apr-1990
4	M. M. Hashim	INC	10-Apr-1990
5	P. Upendra	TDP	10-Apr-1990
6	Jaipal Reddy	JD	10-Apr-1990

=== Arunachal Pradesh ===
#	Candidate	Party	Term start
1	Nyodek Yonggam	INC	27-May-1990

=== Assam ===
#	Candidate	Party	Term start
1	Bhadreswar Buragohain	AGP	10-Apr-1990
2	Dinesh Goswami	AGP	10-Apr-1990
3	Bhubaneswar Kalita	INC	10-Apr-1990

=== Bihar ===
#	Candidate	Party	Term start
1	Ranjan Prasad Yadav	JD	10-Apr-1990
2	Shankar Dayal Singh	JD	10-Apr-1990
3	Digvijay Singh	JD	10-Apr-1990
4	Rajni Ranjan Sahu	INC	10-Apr-1990
5	Rameshwar Thakur	INC	10-Apr-1990
6	Chaturanan Mishra	CPI	10-Apr-1990
7	Kameshwar Paswan	BJP	10-Apr-1990

=== Gujarat ===
#	Candidate	Party	Term start
1	Chimanbhai Mehta	JD	10-Apr-1990
2	Dinesh Trivedi	JD	10-Apr-1990
3	Anant Dave	BJP	10-Apr-1990
4	Gopalsinh Solanki	BJP	10-Apr-1990

=== Haryana ===
#	Candidate	Party	Term start
1	Vidya Beniwal	JD	10-Apr-1990
2	Sushma Swaraj	BJP	10-Apr-1990

=== Himachal Pradesh ===
#	Candidate	Party	Term start
1	Krishan Lal Sharma	BJP	10-Apr-1990

=== Karnataka ===
#	Candidate	Party	Term start
1	I. G. Sanadi	INC	10-Apr-1990
2	G. Y. Krishnan	INC	10-Apr-1990
3	Prabhakar Kore	INC	10-Apr-1990
4	B. K. Hariprasad	INC	10-Apr-1990

=== Madhya Pradesh ===
#	Candidate	Party	Term start
1	Shivprasad Chanpuria	BJP	10-Apr-1990
2	Kailash Sarang	BJP	10-Apr-1990
3	Lakhiram Agrawal	BJP	10-Apr-1990
4	Sikander Bakht	BJP	10-Apr-1990
5	Suresh Pachouri	INC	10-Apr-1990

=== Maharashtra ===
#	Candidate	Party	Term start
1	Shankarrao Chavan	INC	10-Apr-1990
2	Jagesh Desai	INC	10-Apr-1990
3	Chandrika Jain	INC	10-Apr-1990
4	N. K. P. Salve	INC	10-Apr-1990
5	Ghulam Nabi Azad	INC	10-Apr-1990
6	Viren J. Shah	BJP	10-Apr-1990
7	Bapu Kaldate	JD	10-Apr-1990

=== Manipur ===
#	Candidate	Party	Term start
1	B. D. Behring	JD	03-Apr-1990

=== Meghalaya ===
#	Candidate	Party	Term start
1	George Gilbert Swell	HSPDP	13-Apr-1990

=== Mizoram ===
#	Candidate	Party	Term start
1	Hiphei	INC	27-May-1990

=== Odisha ===
#	Candidate	Party	Term start
1	Basant Kumar Das	JD	03-Apr-1990
2	Mira Das	JD	03-Apr-1990
3	Sarada Mohanty	JD	03-Apr-1990
4	Prabhat Kumar Samantaray	JD	03-Apr-1990

=== Rajasthan ===
#	Candidate	Party	Term start
1	Ramdas Agarwal	BJP	10-Apr-1990
2	M. G. K. Menon	JD	10-Apr-1990
3	K. K. Birla	INC	10-Apr-1990

=== Tamil Nadu ===
#	Candidate	Party	Term start
1	Tha. Kiruttinan	DMK	03-Apr-1990
2	Misa Ganesan	DMK	03-Apr-1990
3	Vaiko	DMK	03-Apr-1990
4	K. K. Veerappan	DMK	03-Apr-1990
5	T.A. Mohammed Saqhy	DMK	03-Apr-1990
6	S Madhavan	AIADMK	03-Apr-1990

=== Uttar Pradesh ===
#	Candidate	Party	Term start
1	Satya Prakash Malaviya	JD	03-Apr-1990
2	Anantram Jaiswal	JD	03-Apr-1990
3	Virendra Verma	JD	03-Apr-1990
4	Harmohan Singh Yadav	JD	03-Apr-1990
5	Meem Afzal	JD	03-Apr-1990
6	Obaidullah Khan Azmi	JD	03-Apr-1990
7	Kedar Nath Singh	INC	03-Apr-1990
8	Makhan Lal Fotedar	INC	03-Apr-1990
9	Balram Singh Yadav	INC	03-Apr-1990
10	Jagdish Prasad Mathur	BJP	03-Apr-1990
11	Sangh Priya Gautam	BJP	03-Apr-1990

=== West Bengal ===
#	Candidate	Party	Term start
1	Sarla Maheshwari	CPM	03-Apr-1990
2	Ratna Bahadur Rai	CPM	03-Apr-1990
3	Mohammed Salim	CPM	03-Apr-1990
4	Debabrata Biswas	AIFB	03-Apr-1990
5	Ashoke Kumar Sen	JD	03-Apr-1990

== Bye-elections ==
The following bye elections were held in the year 1990.

=== Bihar ===
#	Member	Party	Date of vacancy	Member	Party	Term start
1	Jagannath Mishra	INC	27-Nov-1989 (Note: sworn in as the Chief Minister of Bihar)	Kamala Sinha	JD	19-Apr-1990

=== Haryana ===
#	Member	Party	Date of vacancy	Member	Party	Term start
1	Bhajan Lal Bishnoi	INC	27-Nov-1989 (Note: elected to Faridabad Lok Sabha constituency)	Krishan Kumar Deepak	JD	26-Mar-1990
2	Krishan Kumar Deepak	JD	13-Jul-1990 (Note: resigned)	Ranjit Singh Chautala	JD	12-Sep-1990

=== Karnataka ===
#	Member	Party	Date of vacancy	Member	Party	Term start
1	D. B. Chandregowda	JD	14-Dec-1989 (Note: elected to Tirthahalli Assembly constituency)	D K Tharadevi	INC	23-Mar-1990

=== Madhya Pradesh ===
#	Member	Party	Date of vacancy	Member	Party	Term start
1	Lal Krishna Advani	BJP	27-Nov-1989 (Note: elected to New Delhi Lok Sabha constituency)	Jinendra Kumar Jain	BJP	23-Mar-1990

=== Rajasthan ===
#	Member	Party	Date of vacancy	Member	Party	Term start
1	Jaswant Singh	BJP	27-Nov-1989 (Note: elected to Jodhpur Lok Sabha constituency)	Gaj Singh	BJP	26-Mar-1990

=== Uttar Pradesh ===
#	Member	Party	Date of vacancy	Member	Party	Term start
1	Rasheed Masood	JP	27-Nov-1989 (Note: elected to Saharanpur Lok Sabha constituency)	Raja Ramanna	JD	23-Mar-1990
2	Sharad Yadav	LKD	27-Nov-1989 (Note: elected to Badaun Lok Sabha constituency)	Rajmohan Gandhi	JD	23-Mar-1990
3	Ajit Singh	LKD	27-Nov-1989 (Note: elected to Baghpat Lok Sabha constituency)	Sompal Shastri	JD	23-Mar-1990
4	Kalpnath Rai	INC	27-Nov-1989 (Note: elected to Ghosi Lok Sabha constituency)	M. S. Gurupadaswamy	JD	10-Apr-1990
5	Virendra Verma	LKD	14-Jun-1990 (Note: appointed as Governor of Punjab)	Sanjaya Sinh	JD	13-Jul-1990
6	Mohammed Amin Ansari	INC	14-Jul-1990 (Note: death)	Z.A. Ahmed	CPI	23-Aug-1990
