= Chandabali Assembly constituency =

Assembly constituency in Odisha

Coordinates: 20.78°N 86.75°E

Chandabali
- Constituency No. 47 for the Odisha Legislative Assembly

Constituency details
- Country: India
- Region: East India
- State: Odisha
- Division: Central Division
- District: Bhadrak
- Lok Sabha constituency: Bhadrak
- Established: 1951
- Total electors: 2,53,394 (Note: as on 2024) (Note: as data published by election commission)
- Reservation: None

Member of Legislative Assembly
- 17th Odisha Legislative Assembly
- Incumbent Byomakesh Ray
- Party: Biju Janata Dal
- Elected year: 2024

Chandabali is a Vidhan Sabha constituency of Bhadrak district, Odisha.

The area of this constituency includes Chandabali, Chandabali block and eight GPs (Daulatapur, Bamanbindha, Harisinghpur, Jamjodi, Rajnagar, Barasar, Sahapur and Gobindapur) of Tihidi block.

== Elected members ==
Vote share of winning candidates
2024	42.72%
2019	43.11%
2014	43.99%
2009	43.57%
2004	39.86%
2000	51.24%
1995	39.8%
1990	58.17%
1985	52.14%
1980	56.92%
1977	61.69%

Since its formation in 1951, 17 elections have been held till date. It was a two-member constituency for 1952 and 1957.

List of members elected from Chandabali constituency:

Year	Member	Party
2024	Byomakesh Ray	Biju Janata Dal
2019	Byomakesh Ray	Biju Janata Dal
2014	Byomakesh Ray	Biju Janata Dal
2009	Bijaya Nayak	Biju Janata Dal
2004	Netrananda Mallick	Indian National Congress
2000	Bishnu Charan Sethi	Bharatiya Janata Party
1995	Netrananda Mallick	Indian National Congress
1990	Bairagi Jena	Janata Dal
1985	Netrananda Mallick	Indian National Congress
1980	Netrananda Mallick	Indian National Congress (I)
1977	Gangadhar Das	Janata Party
1974	Manmohan Das	Utkal Congress
1971	Gangadhar Das	Indian National Congress (R)
1967	Manmohan Das	Orissa Jana Congress
1961	Bairagi Jena	Indian National Congress
1957 (Note: It was a two member constituency.)	Nanda Kishore Jena	Indian National Congress
1957	Nilamani Routray	Indian National Congress
1951 (Note: It was a two member constituency.)	Brundabana Das	Indian National Congress
1951	Chakradhar Behera	Indian National Congress

== Election results ==
=== 2024 ===
Voting was held on 1 June 2024 in the 4th phase of the Odisha Assembly election and the 7th phase of the Indian general election. Counting of votes was on 4 June 2024. In the 2024 election, Biju Janata Dal candidate Byomakesh Ray defeated Bharatiya Janata party candidate Manmohan Samal by a margin of 1,916 votes.

2024 Odisha Vidhan Sabha election: Chandabali
Party	Candidate	Votes	%	±%
BJD	Byomakesh Ray	83,063	42.72	▼0.49
BJP	Manmohan Samal	81,147	41.74	▲3.48
INC	Amiya Kumar Mahapatra	28,483	14.65	▼2.16
NOTA	None of the above	317	0.16	▼0.14
Majority		1,916	0.98	
Turnout		1,94,420	76.73	
BJD hold				

=== 2019 ===
In the 2019 election, Biju Janata Dal candidate Byomakesh Ray defeated Bharatiya Janata party candidate Manmohan Samal by a margin of 8080 votes.

2019 Odisha Legislative Assembly election: Chandabali
Party	Candidate	Votes	%	±%
BJD	Byomakesh Ray	77,313	43.11	
BJP	Manmohan Samal	69,233	38.26	
INC	Digambar Das	30,146	16.81	
BSP	Ajaya Kumar Mahalik	1,083	0.6	
NOTA	None of the above	536	0.3	
Majority		8,080	4.85	
Turnout		1,79,352	75.09	
BJD hold				

=== 2014 ===
In the 2014 election, Biju Janata Dal candidate Byomakesh Ray defeated Indian National Congress candidate Amiya Kumar Mahapatra by a margin of 24,883 votes.

2014 Vidhan Sabha election: Chandabali
Party	Candidate	Votes	%	±%
BJD	Byomakesh Ray	68,557	43.99	0.42
INC	Amiya Kumar Mahapatra	43,674	28.02	9.87
BJP	Manmohan Samal	38,952	24.99	13.97
NOTA	None of the above	539	0.35	−
Majority		24,883	15.96	10.29
Turnout		1,55,859	76.8	8.51
Registered electors		2,02,953		
BJD hold				

=== 2009 ===
In the 2009 election, Biju Janata Dal candidate Bijaya Nayak defeated Indian National Congress candidate Amiya Kumar Mahapatra by a margin of 7,613 votes.

2009 Odisha Legislative Assembly election: Chandabali
Party	Candidate	Votes	%	±%
BJD	Bijaya Nayak	58,467	43.57	−
INC	Amiya Kumar Mahapatra	50,854	37.89	−
BJP	Purna Chandra Pani	14,784	11.02	−
Majority		7,613	5.67 (Note: %of total valid votes)	−
Turnout		1,34,220	68.29	−
BJD gain from INC				
