= Pratap Keshari Deb =

Indian politician

Member of Odisha Legislative Assembly
- Incumbent
- Assumed office June 2019
- Preceded by: Devendra Sharma (Congress)
- Constituency: Aul

MP of Rajya Sabha for Odisha
- Preceded by: Bishnu Charan Das, BJD
- Constituency: Odisha

Personal details
- Born: 16 October 1972 (age 53)
- Party: BJD
- Parent(s): Lt. Sarat Kumar Deb (Father), Sushree Devi (Mother)
- Education: B.A. from Ramjas College, 12th from Rajkumar College, Raipur
- Profession: Social Work, Agriculture, Pisci Culture

Pratap Keshari Deb (born 16 October 1972) is an Indian politician from the state of Odisha. In May 2017, he won a bypoll to the Rajya Sabha seat from Odisha constituency which was vacated by Bishnu Charan Das when he was appointed chairman of Odisha State Planning Board. Pratap Deb filed a nomination and won the seat uncontested on 18 May 2017. He will complete the remainder of his term on 1 July 2022.

Pratap Keshari Deb is a member of 16th Assembly of Odisha (2019 - 2024) elected from Aul. Deb had defeated his nearest Congress rival Devendra Sharma by a margin of 55,601 votes. He was inducted into Naveen Patnaik's Cabinet as Industries, Micro, Small and Medium Enterprises, Energy Minister in June 2022.

Rajya Sabha
Preceded by Bishnu Charan Das	Member of Parliament in Rajya Sabha for Odisha; 2017 –	Succeeded by ?
State Legislative Assembly
Preceded by Devendra Sharma (INC)	Member of the Odisha Legislative Assembly from Aul Assembly constituency 2019–	Succeeded by successor
