= Munna Khan =

Indian actor and politician

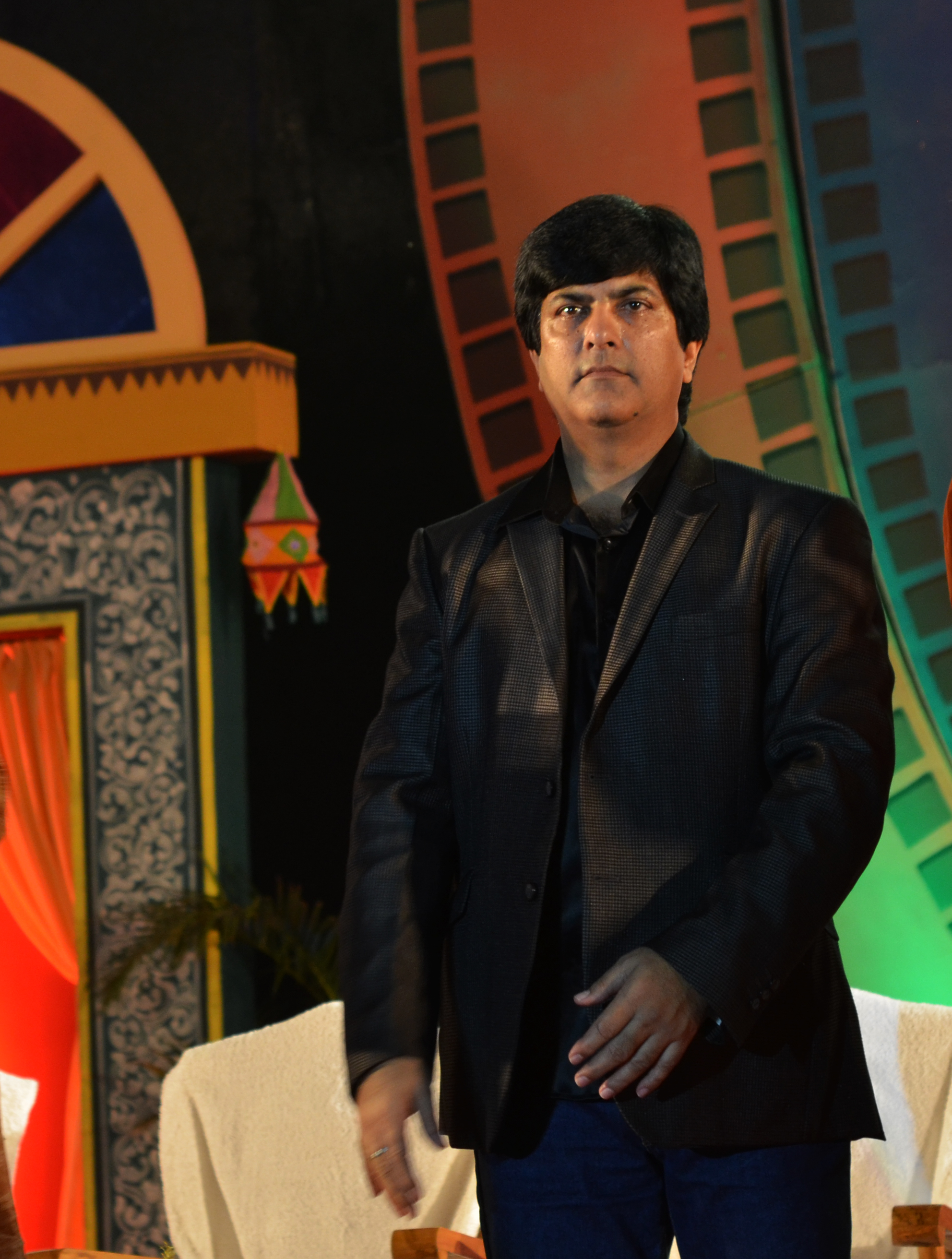
- Khan during Odisha State Film Awards 2014

Member of Parliament, Rajya Sabha
- In office 3 April 2020 – 2 April 2026
- Succeeded by: Santrupt Misra
- Constituency: Odisha

Personal details
- Born: 13 January 1963 (age 63) Nabarangpur, Odisha, India
- Party: Biju Janata Dal

Munna Khan, also known as Muzibulla Khan, is a former film actor and politician who served as a member of parliament of India (Rajya Sabha).

He was with Janata Dal earlier and joined Biju Janata Dal after its formation. He was also BJD’s minority cell president for a brief period.

Before becoming full time politician Munna Khan started his career as an Odia film actor and moved to politics at the age of 23. He is best known for Mamata Ra Dori (1989), Kie Kahara(1997), Mu Premi Mu Pagala (2011) and Mu Kana Ete Kharap (2010).
