= Mamata Mohanta =

Indian politician (born 1976)

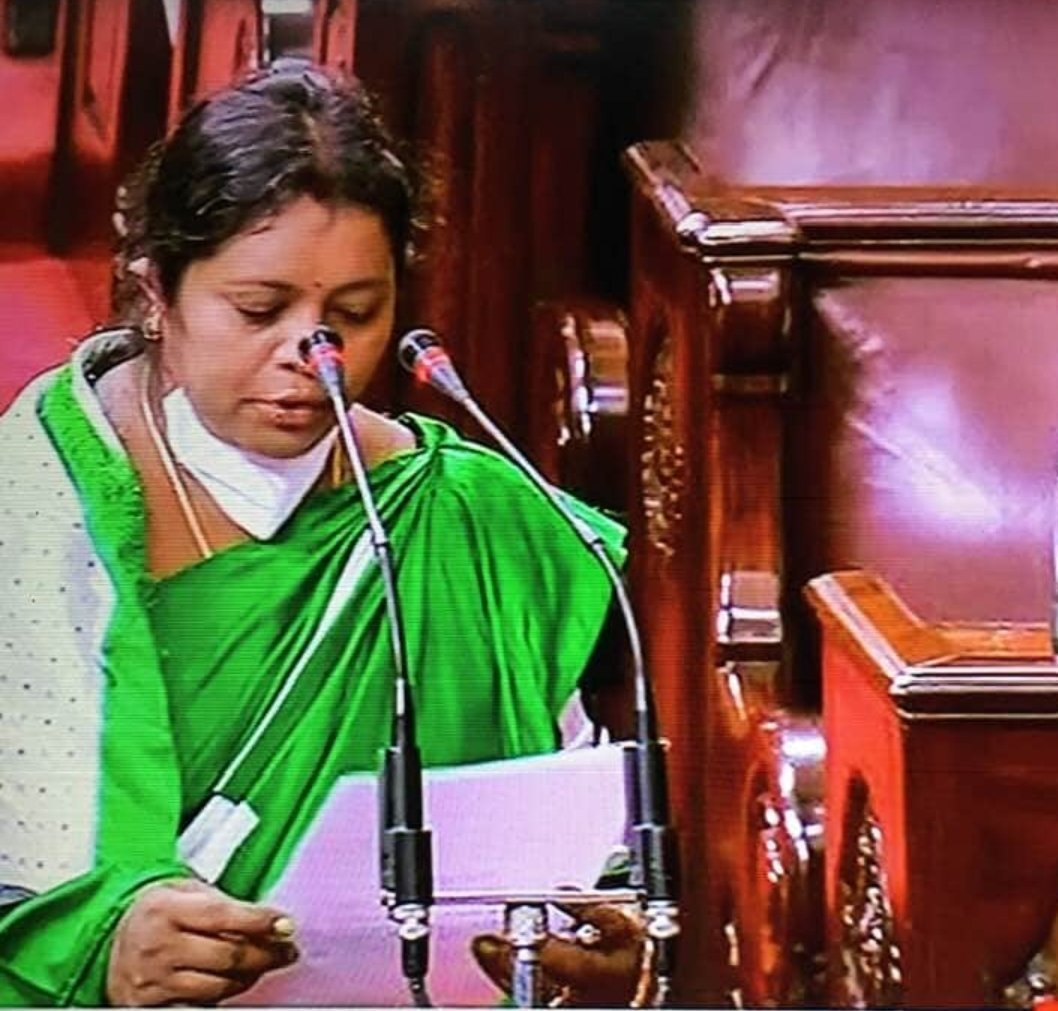
- Mohanta taking oath in 2020

Member of Parliament, Rajya Sabha
- In office 27 August 2024 – 2 April 2026
- Preceded by: Herself
- Succeeded by: Manmohan Samal
- Constituency: Odisha
- In office 3 April 2020 – 31 July 2024
- Succeeded by: Herself
- Constituency: Odisha

Personal details
- Born: 20 February 1976 (age 50) Saraskana, Odisha, India
- Party: Bharatiya Janata Party
- Other political affiliations: Biju Janata Dal
- Spouse: Bijay Kumar Mohanta (m. 2006)
- Children: 1
- Parents: Baburam Mohanta (father); Golap Manjari Mohanta (mother)
- Education: Utkal University
- Occupation: Farmer; politician

Mamata Mohanta (born 20 February 1976) is an Indian politician. She was a member of parliament in Rajya Sabha the upper house of Indian Parliament from Odisha as a member of the Bharatiya Janata Party.

She was declared elected unopposed among the four candidates for the four seats from Odisha in the 2020 Rajysabha Elections. She resigned from BJD and Joined BJP. She also resigned as Rajya Sabha MP.

== Biography ==
Mamata Mohanta is a social activist and leader of the Kudmi community in Odisha, India. The Kudmi community is historically marginalized and oppressed and primarily relies on agriculture for their livelihood. Mamata Mohanta has been a vocal advocate for the rights of the Kudmi community and has been involved in various movements and protests to demand land rights, better working conditions for farmers, and access to education and healthcare. She is also the founder of the Kudmi Mahila Sabha, a women's organization that works towards empowering women in the Kudmi community and promoting their rights. Mamata Mohanta has been recognized for her work and has received several awards, including the Odisha Living Legend Award and the International Women's Day Awards. Overall, Mamata Mohanta is a respected figure in the Kudmi community and a prominent voice for social justice and equality in Odisha.
