= Sakala (Odia) =

Indian newspaper

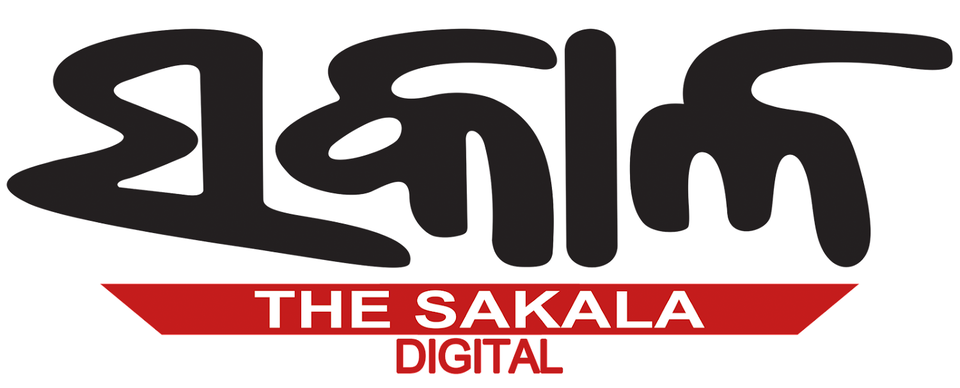
- Type: Daily
- Format: Print, Online
- Owner: Manas Ranjan Mangaraj
- Publisher: Amit Kumar Mallik
- Associate editor: Samarendu Das
- Founded: 1 December 2020
- Language: Odia
- Headquarters: Bhubaneswar
- Website: sakalaepaper.com thesakala.in

Sakala is an Indian newspaper of Odia language which is published daily from Bhubaneswar, Odisha. It is one of the fastest growing Odia newspapers in Odisha. It is published from the capital city of Bhubaneswar, as well as from Cuttack, Berhampur, Rourkela, Sambalpur, Balasore, Jajpur, Jeypore, and Angul. The first edition of this newspaper was published on December 1, 2020, in Bhubaneswar.

Sakala also has the largest readership in the state of Odisha.
