= Rourkela Assembly constituency =

Constituency of the Odisha legislative assembly in India

Coordinates: 22.22°N 84.86°E

Rourkela
- Constituency No. 12 for the Odisha Legislative Assembly
- Rourkela Assembly constituency in Sundargarh district

Constituency details
- Country: India
- Region: East India
- State: Odisha
- Division: Northern Division
- District: Sundargarh
- Lok Sabha constituency: Sundargarh
- Established: 1967
- Total electors: 2,15,294 (Note: as on 2024) (Note: as data published by election commission)
- Reservation: None

Member of Legislative Assembly
- 17th Odisha Legislative Assembly
- Incumbent Sarada Prashad Nayak
- Party: Biju Janata Dal
- Elected year: 2024

Rourkela is an Assembly constituency of Sundergarh district in Odisha State. It was established in 1967.

== Extent of Assembly Constituencies ==
- Rourkela Municipal Corporation
- Bisra Block : Kulunga (O.G.), Jagada and Jhirpani GPs.

== Elected members ==
Vote share of winning candidates
| 2024 | 46.46% |
| 2019 | 47.29% |
| 2014 | 48.37% |
| 2009 | 53.25% |
| 2004 | 58.51% |
| 2000 | 52.86% |
| 1995 | 43.64% |
| 1990 | 77.22% |
| 1985 | 45.48% |
| 1980 | 34.13% |
| 1977 | 62.39% |

Since its formation in 1967, 15 elections were held till date including one bypoll in 1971.

List of members elected from Rourkela constituency are:

| Year | Member | Party |
|---|---|---|
| 2024 | Sarada Prashad Nayak | Biju Janata Dal |
| 2019 | Sarada Prashad Nayak | Biju Janata Dal |
| 2014 | Dilip Kumar Ray | Bharatiya Janata Party |
| 2009 | Sarada Prashad Nayak | Biju Janata Dal |
| 2004 | Sarada Prashad Nayak | Biju Janata Dal |
| 2000 | Ajit Das | Biju Janata Dal |
| 1995 | Prabhat Mohapatra | Indian National Congress |
| 1990 | Dilip Kumar Ray | Janata Dal |
| 1985 | Dilip Kumar Ray | Janata Dal |
| 1980 | Gurupada Nanda | Indian National Congress (I) |
| 1977 | Braja Kishore Mohanty | Indian National Congress |
| 1974 | Dhananjaya Mohanty | Indian National Congress |
| 1971 (bypoll) (Note: Resignation of Shyamsundar Mohapatra) | Bishwanath Das | Independent politician |
| 1971 | Shyamsundar Mohapatra | Indian National Congress |
| 1967 | Rajkishore Samantarai | Praja Socialist Party |

== Election results ==
=== 2024 ===
Voting were held on 20 May 2024 in 2nd phase of Odisha Assembly Election & 5th phase of Indian General Election. Counting of votes was on 4 June 2024. In 2024 election, Biju Janata Dal candidate Sarada Prasad Nayak defeated Bharatiya Janata Party candidate Dilip Kumar Ray by a margin of 3,552 votes.

2024 Odisha Vidhan Sabha Election, Rourkela
| Party | Candidate | Votes | % | ±% |
|---|---|---|---|---|
| BJD | Sarada Prashad Nayak | 64,660 | 46.46 | ▼0.83 |
| BJP | Dilip Kumar Ray | 61,108 | 43.91 | ▲4.74 |
| INC | Birendra Nath Pattnaik | 8,751 | 6.29 | ▼4.57 |
| Independent | Nihar Ray | 2,522 | 1.81 | |
| NOTA | None of the above | 837 | 0.6 | ▼0.10 |
| Majority | | 3,552 | 2.55 | |
| Turnout | | 139,170 | 64.64 | |
| BJD hold | | Swing | | |

=== 2019 ===
In 2019 election, Biju Janata Dal candidate Sarada Prasad Nayak defeated Bharatiya Janata Party candidate Nihar Ray by a margin of 10,460 votes.

2019 Odisha Legislative Assembly election: Rourkela
| Party | Candidate | Votes | % | ±% |
|---|---|---|---|---|
| BJD | Sarada Prashad Nayak | 60,877 | 47.29 | ▲7.78 |
| BJP | Nihar Ray | 50,417 | 39.17 | ▼9.2 |
| INC | Biren Senapaty | 13,977 | 10.86 | ▲2.43 |
| NOTA | None of the above | 895 | 0.7 | − |
| Majority | | 10,460 | 7.96 | |
| Turnout | | 1,31,375 | 63.75 | |
| BJD gain from BJP | | Swing | | |

=== 2014 ===
In 2014 election, Bharatiya Janata Party candidate Dilip Kumar Ray defeated Biju Janata Dal candidate Sarada Prasad Nayak by a margin of 10,929 votes.

2014 Odisha Legislative Assembly election: Rourkela
| Party | Candidate | Votes | % | ±% |
|---|---|---|---|---|
| BJP | Dilip Kumar Ray | 59,653 | 48.37 | ▲24.74 |
| BJD | Sarada Prashad Nayak | 48,724 | 39.51 | ▼13.74 |
| INC | Pravat Mohapatra | 10,397 | 8.43 | ▼8.59 |
| NOTA | None of the above | 1,091 | 0.88 | − |
| Majority | | 10,929 | 8.86 | |
| Turnout | | 1,23,320 | 68.84 | 21.05 |
| Registered electors | | 1,79,140 | | |
| BJP gain from BJD | | | | |

=== 2009 ===
In 2009 election, Biju Janata Dal candidate Sarada Prashad Nayak defeated Bharatiya Janata Party candidate Ramesh Kumar Agrawal 25,596 votes.

2009 Odisha Legislative Assembly election: Rourkela
| Party | Candidate | Votes | % | ±% |
|---|---|---|---|---|
| BJD | Sarada Prashad Nayak | 46,020 | 53.25 | − |
| BJP | Ramesh Kumar Agrawal | 20,424 | 23.63 | − |
| INC | Prashanta Kumar Behera | 14,707 | 17.02 | − |
| Majority | | 25,596 | 29.61 (Note: % of total valid votes) | |
| Turnout | | 86,488 | 47.79 | |
| BJD hold | | | | |
