= Pramila =

Pramila may refer to:

- Pramila Bhatt, Indian cricketer
- Pramila Bohidar, Indian member of parliament
- Pramila Jayapal, U.S. congresswoman
- Pramila Patten, UN official from Mauritius
- Pramila (moth), a genus of moths
- Pramila or Esther Victoria Abraham, an Indian actress
