= Byomakesh Ray =

Indian politician

Member of Odisha Legislative Assembly
- Incumbent
- Assumed office 4 June 2024
- Preceded by: Byomakesh Ray
- Constituency: Chandabali

Personal details
- Party: Biju Janata Dal
- Profession: Politician

Byomakesh Ray is an Indian politician who was elected to the Odisha Legislative Assembly from Chandabali as a member of the Biju Janata Dal.
