= Sarada Prasad Nayak =

Indian politician (born 1959)

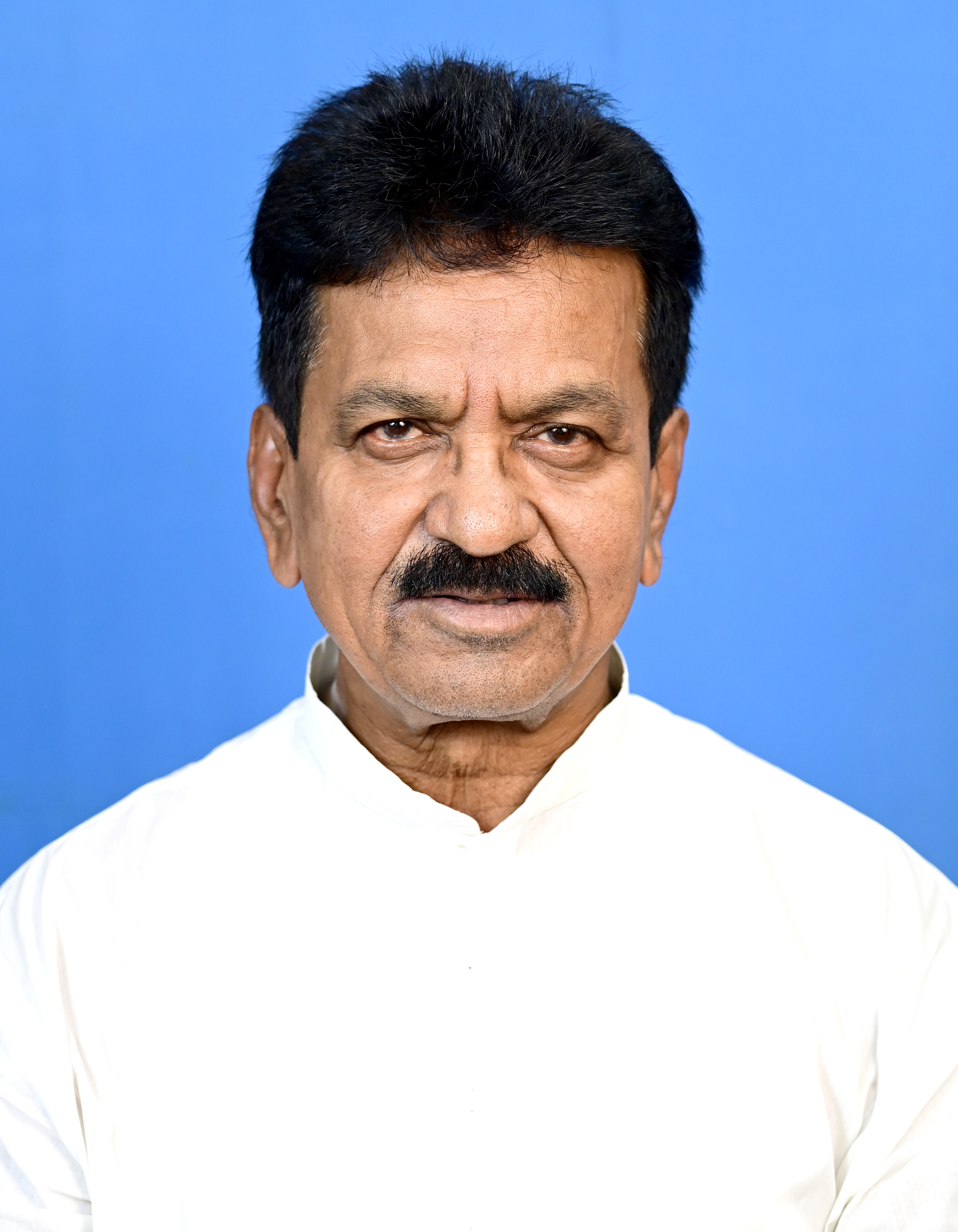
- Official Portrait 2024

Member Of Odisha Legislative Assembly
- Incumbent
- Assumed office June 2024
- Preceded by: Himself
- Succeeded by: Himeslf
- Constituency: Rourkela
- In office 2009–2014
- Preceded by: Himself
- Succeeded by: Dilip Ray
- Constituency: Rourkela
- In office 2004–2009
- Preceded by: Ajit Das
- Succeeded by: Himself
- Constituency: Rourkela
- In office 2019–2024
- Preceded by: Dilip Ray
- Succeeded by: Himself
- Constituency: Rourkela

Minister Of Odisha Govt.
- In office 22 May 2023 – 11 June 2024
- Chief Minister: Naveen Patnaik
- In office 21 May 2009 – 4 June 2012
- Chief Minister: Naveen Patnaik

Personal details
- Born: 5 January 1959 (age 67) Kendrapara, Orissa, India
- Party: Biju Janata Dal
- Parent: Natbar Nayak (father)
- Profession: Politician, MLA, social service

Sarada Prasad Nayak is an Indian politician, belonging to the Biju Janata Dal party; who was elected as MLA of Rourkela Constituency. He is the 10th,11th,13th and 14th MLA of Rourkela. He was elected from General (Quota) in Fourteenth Assembly from 19 May 2009 to 18 May 2014, and has been serving the current term since then. Nayak was sworn in as a Cabinet Minister of the Naveen Patnaik-led government in May 2023. He was entrusted with the Labour & Employees’ State Insurance department.
