= Niranjan Bishi =

Indian politician

Member of Parliament, Rajya Sabha
- In office 2022–2026
- Succeeded by: Dilip Ray
- Constituency: List of Rajya Sabha members from Odisha

Personal details
- Party: Biju Janata Dal

Niranjan Bishi is an Indian politician and a former member of the Rajya Sabha, upper house of the Parliament of India from Odisha as member of the Biju Janata Dal.
