= Surendra Lath =

Indian politician

Member of Parliament, Rajya Sabha
- In office 3 April 2002 – 2 April 2008
- Succeeded by: Balbir Punj
- Constituency: Odisha

Personal details
- Born: 30 November 1949 (age 76) Sambalpur, Odisha
- Party: Bharatiya Janata Party
- Spouse: Sushila Devi Lath (m. 1972)
- Children: 2 sons (Sachin Lath, Sidharth Lath), 1 daughter
- Parents: Prabhudayal Lath (father); Radha Devi Lath (mother)
- Education: Bachelor of Commerce
- Alma mater: Sambalpur University

Surendra Lath (born 30 November 1949) is an Indian politician of the Bharatiya Janata Party. He served one term (3 April 2002 – 2 April 2008) as a member of the Parliament of India representing Orissa in the Rajya Sabha, the upper house of the Indian Parliament.
