= Dhamnagar Assembly constituency =

Constituency of the Odisha legislative assembly in India

Coordinates: 20.92°N 86.44°E

Dhamnagar
- Constituency No. 46 for the Odisha Legislative Assembly

Constituency details
- Country: India
- Region: East India
- State: Odisha
- Division: Central Division
- District: Bhadrak
- Lok Sabha constituency: Bhadrak
- Established: 1951
- Total electors: 2,47,651 (Note: as on 2024) (Note: as data published by election commission)
- Reservation: SC

Member of Legislative Assembly
- 17th Odisha Legislative Assembly
- Incumbent Suryabanshi Suraj
- Party: Bharatiya Janata Party
- Elected year: 2024

Dhamnagar is a constituency of the Odisha Legislative Assembly, in Bhadrak district, Odisha, India. This constituency includes Dhamnagar block and 13 GPs (Paliabindha, Nayananda, Achak, Dolasahi, Guamal, Talapada, Kubera, Bilana, Baro, Bodak, Kanpada, Shyamsundarpur and Talagopabindha) of Tihidi block.

== Elected members ==
Vote share of winning candidates
2024	50.31%
2022 (bypoll)	49.09%
2019	48.47%
2014	47.98%
2009	43.57%
2004	48.55%
2000	35.03%
1995	42.69%
1991 (bypoll)	56.20%
1990	56.21%
1985	50.00%
1980	61.23%
1977	54.21%

Since its formation in 1951, 19 elections were held till date including two bypolls in 1990 & 2022.

List of members elected from Dhamnagar constituency are:

Election	Name	Party
2024	Suryabanshi Suraj	Bharatiya Janata Party
2022 (bypoll) (Note: Death of Bishnu Sethi)	Suryabanshi Suraj	Bharatiya Janata Party
2019	Bishnu Charan Sethi	Bharatiya Janata Party
2014	Muktikanta Mandal	Biju Janata Dal
2009	Rajendra Kumar Das	Biju Janata Dal
2004	Manmohan Samal	Bharatiya Janata Party
2000	Manas Ranjan Mallik	Independent politician
1995	Jagannath Rout	Indian National Congress
1990 (bypoll) (Note: Death of Hrudananda Mallick)	Manas Ranjan Mallik	Janata Dal
1990	Hrudananda Mallick	Janata Dal
1985	Jagannath Rout	Indian National Congress
1980	Jagannath Rout	Indian National Congress (I)
1977	Hrudananda Mallick	Janata Party
1974	Hrudananda Mallick	Utkal Congress
1971	Hrudananda Mallick	Utkal Congress
1967	Satyabhama Dei	Orissa Jana Congress
1961	Muralidhar Jena	Indian National Congress
1957	Muralidhar Jena	Indian National Congress
1951	Nilamani Routray	Indian National Congress

== Election results ==
=== 2024 ===
Voting were held on 1 June 2024 in 4th phase of Odisha Assembly Election & 7th phase of Indian General Election. Counting of votes was on 4 June 2024. In 2024 election, Bharatiya Janata Party candidate Suryabanshi Suraj defeated Biju Janata Dal candidate Sanjay Kumar Das by a margin of 8,095 votes.

2024 Odisha Vidhan Sabha Election, Dhamnagar
Party	Candidate	Votes	%	±%
BJP	Suryabanshi Suraj	90,555	50.31	
BJD	Sanjay Kumar Das	82,460	45.81	
INC	Ranjan Kumar Behera	5,732	3.18	
NOTA	None of the above	361	0.2	
Majority		8,095	4.5	
Turnout		1,79,992	72.68	
BJP gain from				

=== 2022 Bypoll ===
In 2022 bye-election, Bharatiya Janata Party candidate Suryabanshi Suraj defeated Biju Janata Dal candidate Abanti Das by a margin of 9,881 votes.

Odisha Assembly by election, 2022: Dhamnagar
Party	Candidate	Votes	%	±%
BJP	Suryabanshi Suraj	80,351	49.09	
BJD	Abanti Das	70,470	43.05	
Independent	Rajendra Kumar Das	8,153	4.98	
INC	Harekrushna sethi	3,533	2.18	
NOTA	None of the above	649	0.4	
Majority		9,881	6.04	
Turnout		1,63,682	66.63	
BJP hold				

=== 2019 ===
In 2019 election, Bharatiya Janata Party candidate Bishnu Charan Sethi defeated Biju Janata Dal candidate Rajendra Kumar Das by a margin of 4,625 votes.

2019 Odisha Legislative Assembly election: Dhamnagar
Party	Candidate	Votes	%	±%
BJP	Bishnu Charan Sethi	80,111	47.47	
BJD	Rajendra Kumar Das	75,486	45.67	
INC	Bidyadhar Jena	7,303	4.42	
BSP	Budhiram Samal	769	0.47	
NOTA	None	613	0.37	
Majority		4,625	2.80	
Turnout		1,65,272	71.93	
BJP gain from BJD				

=== 2014 ===
In 2014 election, Biju Janata Dal candidate Muktikanta Mandal defeated Bharatiya Janata Party candidate Bishnu Charan Sethi by a margin of 9,192 votes.

2014 Odisha Legislative Assembly election: Dhamnagar
Party	Candidate	Votes	%	±%
BJD	Muktikanta Mandal	71,538	47.98	9.2
BJP	Bishnu Charan Sethi	62,346	41.82	7.0
INC	Hrudananda Sethi	12046	8.08	−15.82
NOTA	None of the above	739	0.5	−
Majority		9,192	6.16	2.2
Turnout		1,49,090	74.22	8.11
Registered electors		2,00,867		
BJD hold				

=== 2009 ===
In 2009 election, Biju Janata Dal candidate Rajendra Kumar Das defeated Bharatiya Janata Party candidate Bishnu Charan Sethi by a margin of 4,944 votes.

2009 Odisha Legislative Assembly election, Dhamnagar
Party	Candidate	Votes	%	±%
BJD	Rajendra Kumar Das	48,424	38.78	−
BJP	Bishnu Charan Sethi	43,480	34.82	−
INC	Netrananda Mallick	29,844	23.90	−
Majority		4,944	3.96 (Note: %of total valid votes)	−
Turnout		1,24,930	66.11	−
BJD gain from BJP				
