= Bishnu Sethi =

Indian politician (1961–2022)

Bishnu Charan Sethi
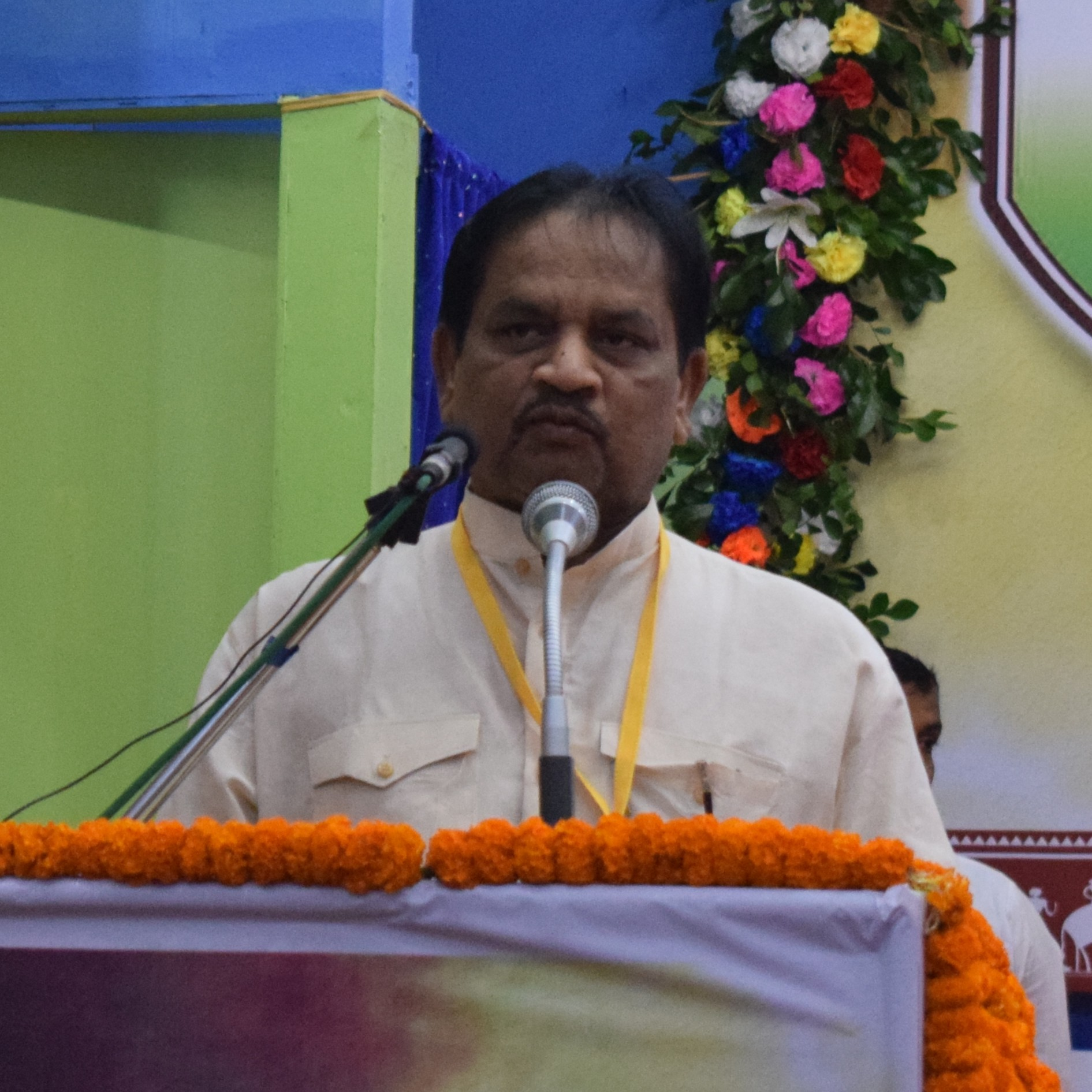
- Sethi in 2019
- Born: 5 June 1961; Tihidi, Odisha, India
- Died: 19 September 2022 (aged 61); Bhubaneshwar, Odisha, India
- Education: Jawaharlal Nehru University
- Occupations: Politician; writer
- Children: Suryabanshi Suraj

Signature
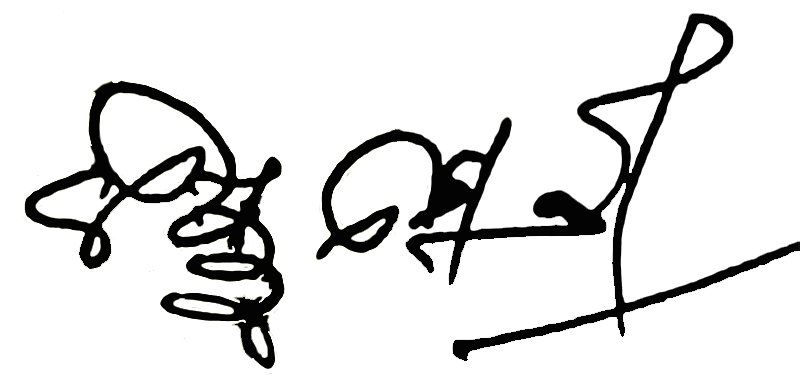

Bishnu Sethi ([bisɳu t͡ʃɔɾɔɳɔ seʈʰi]) (5 June 1961 – 19 September 2022) was an Indian politician who served in the Odisha Legislative Assembly.

A leader of Bharatiya Janata Party, Sethi was the BJP Odisha unit vice president. He was the MLA for Chandabali Assembly Constituency from 2000 to 2004 and then for Dhamnagar from 2019 till his death in 2022. He was also a poet and writer in Odia literature.

In July 2022 he was hospitalised for COVID-19 and subsequently died from the virus.

== Early life and education ==
Sethi was born on 5 June 1961 in a remote village of Tihidi in the district of Bhadrak (Odisha). From the very beginning of his childhood, he lost his mother and was brought up by his father Gayadhar Sethi. He completed his schooling from Tihidi High School. He has been connected with RSS/BJP and ABVP from his early political life.

He passed BA in History & Library Science from Utkal University then moved to JNU. He qualified for OAS conducted by OPSC two times. He was the founder secretary of a mere English Medium School, Tihidi, Bhadrak.

== Early political career ==
Being influenced by the ideology of Atal Bihari Bajpayee, Sethi's first political exposure was: a member of Bharatiya Janata Yuva Morcha. During the rise of BJP in India, Sethi stood in Bhadrak Lokasabha seat at the age of 30 from BJP in 1991 but he lost. Then he was appointed secretary of Bharatiya Janata Yuva Morcha of Odisha state. With his leadership, BJP was propelled to a greater political prominence in Bhadrak. He took the charge of district president of his party three times.

== Political career ==
In the year of 1995, he had joined BJP.

In 2000 Sethi was elected to Odisha Legislative Assembly from Chandabali seat as a member. In 2004 Sethi again appeared as an MLA candidate from BJP and BJD united alliance; but he lost the battle by a mere margin of votes in same.

In the year of 2006 he was selected as the chairman of Odisha State Cashew Development Corporation. Being the chairperson of the Corporation he threw his attempts to boost cashew plantation program in Odisha abruptly and laid the paper before Goa Convention regarding this.

In 2009 and 2014 Sethi again fought as the BJP candidate from Dhamanagar assembly constituency but he could not win the elections. Regardless of the defeats, he had virtues of his oratorical and organisational skills. In 2016 he has been appointed state vice president of Odisha BJP.

He was elected as a member of estimate committee of Odisha Legislative Assembly.

He was Deputy Leader of BJP Legislature Party in Odisha Assembly.

In 2019 Odisha Assembly Election he won from Dhamanagar seat as BJP candidate, but following this he died in 2022 due to Coronavirus.

== Political ideology ==
Sethi believed in "ଏକାତ୍ମା ମାନବବାଦ" (Ekātmā Mānaba Bāda) the doctrine of integral humanism, which is also the official doctrine of his party. He had a strong belief in the ideology of BJP and Prime Minister Narendra Modi and was confident about BJP fulfilling all its commitments towards nation made during general election. He had also written an Odia work "Ghāsåphulå" (ଘାସଫୁଲ).

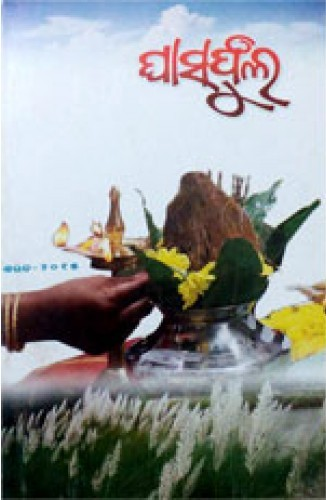
Ghasaphula

== Literature works ==
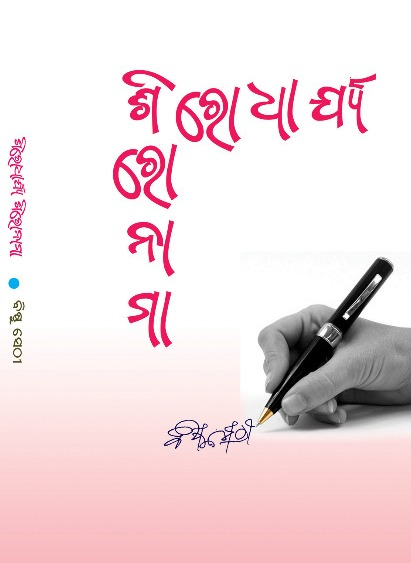
Sironama Sirodharya

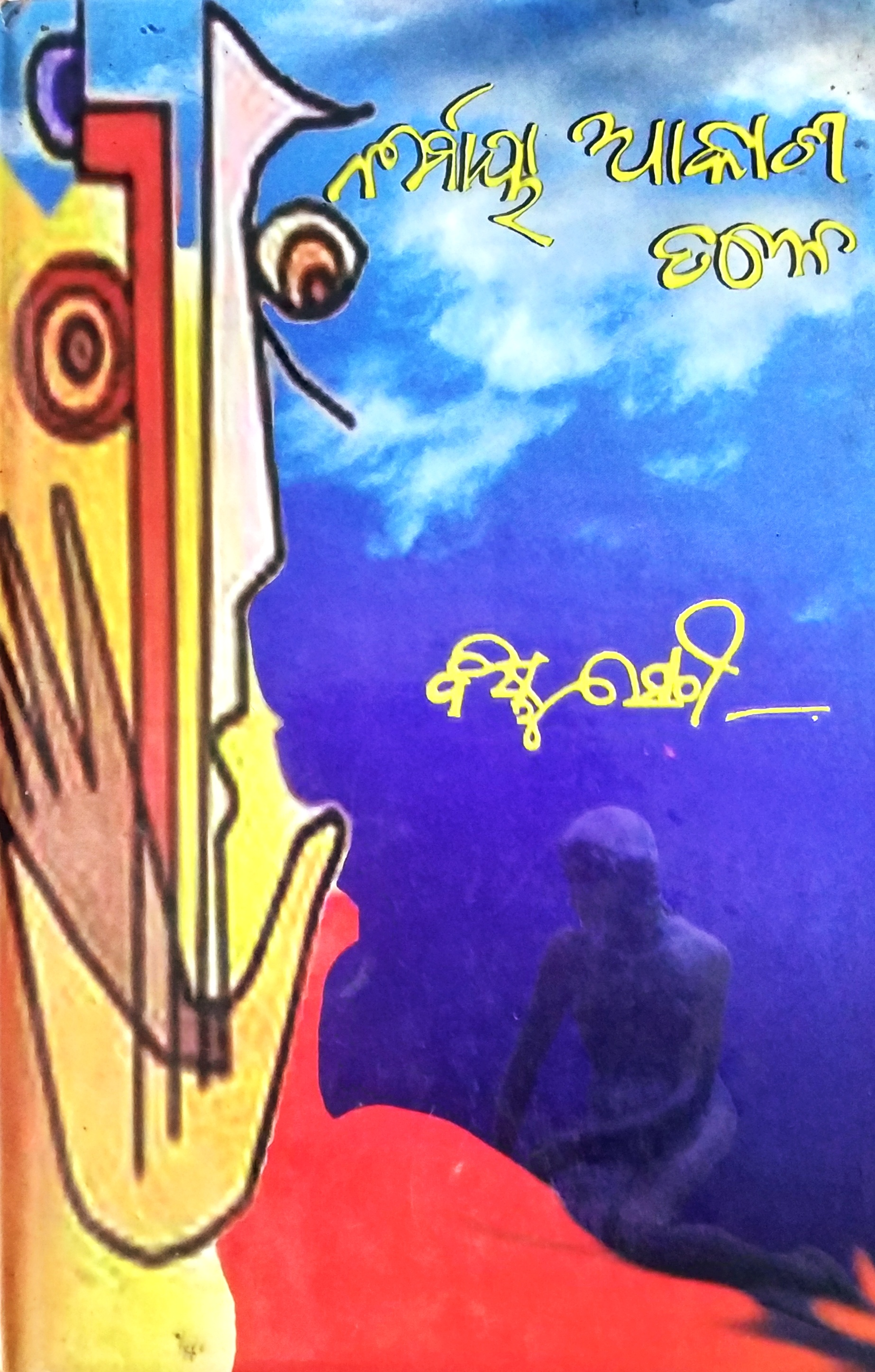
Nirmaya Akasha Tale

Sethi was the sub-editor of Odia weekly Bisesh Khabar. He was the editor of Ghasaphula, a historical and cultural quarterly magazine. His prose collection 'Sironama Sirodharya' reflects many socio-cultural issues and their solutions. He wrote two poem collections named Nirmaya Aakash Tale and Niswa Matira Swara. Moreover, he had keen interest in short stories and Odia history, culture, heritage and language also. He was the regular columnist of various Odia newspapers and journals. He has been elected as the Senate Member to Utkal University of Culture, Bhubaneswar.

For last years he was the pioneer to organize the Literary assembly of college and school level students. He was the editorial member of 'Utkal Sammilani'.

He was the regular member of Indian National Trust for Art and Cultural Heritage which makes commitment on Indian architectural heritage and cultural-historical symphony.

During his first time membership of Odisha Legislative Assembly, he drew the attention of Odisha to declare Bande Utkal Janani as State Anthem, the creation of Late Kantakabi Lakshmikanta Mahapatra, which is not achieved officially.
