= Dilip Ray =

Indian Politician

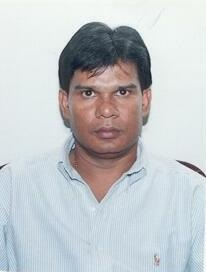

Member of Parliament, Rajya Sabha
- Incumbent
- Assumed office 3 April 2026
- Preceded by: Niranjan Bishi
- Constituency: Odisha

Union Minister of State (Independent Charge) of Steel
- In office 13 October 1999 – 27 May 2000
- Prime Minister: Atal Bihari Vajpayee
- Preceded by: Naveen Patnaik
- Succeeded by: Braja Kishore Tripathy

Union Minister of State (Independent Charge) of Coal
- In office 20 March 1998 – 13 October 1999
- Prime Minister: Atal Bihari Vajpayee
- Preceded by: Inder Kumar Gujral
- Succeeded by: Ministry abolished

Union Minister of State (Independent Charge) of Food Processing Industries
- In office 6 July 1996 – 25 December 1997
- Prime Minister: H. D. Deve Gowda; Inder Kumar Gujral
- Preceded by: H. D. Deve Gowda
- Succeeded by: Jaipal Reddy

Union Minister of State (Independent Charge) of Animal Husbandry and Dairying
- In office 29 June 1996–6 July 1996
- Prime Minister: H. D. Deve Gowda
- Succeeded by: Raghuvansh Prasad Singh

Former Member Of Rajya Sabha
- In office 1996–2002
- In office 2002–2008
- Succeeded by: Mangala Kisan

Minister Of Odisha Govt. Under Biju Patnaik Cabinet
- In office 15 March 1990 – 1 January 1991
- In office 1 January 1991 – 15 March 1995

Member Of Odisha Legislative Assembly
- In office 1985–1995
- Preceded by: Gurupada Nanda
- Succeeded by: Prabhat Mohapatra
- Constituency: Rourkela
- In office 2014–2019
- Preceded by: Sarada Prasad Nayak
- Succeeded by: Sarada Prasad Nayak
- Constituency: Rourkela

Personal details
- Born: January 9, 1954 (age 72) Rourkela, Orissa, India
- Party: Bharatiya Janata Party(2014-Present)
- Other political affiliations: Janata Party (1985-1990); Janata Dal(1990-1997); Biju Janata Dal (1997-2002)
- Spouses: Pooja Ray(m.2010s); Nilima Ray(1980s-?)
- Children: 3
- Relatives: Nilamani Routray (Distant Relative)
- Occupation: Politician; Hotelier

Dilip Ray is an Indian politician and hotelier from the state of Odisha. He is a member of parliament from Odisha and a member of the Bharatiya Janata Party. He was formerly Union Minister of Steel, Coal and Parliamentary Affairs. He was also served minister In Biju Patnaik Cabinet. He is the founder and CMD of Mayfair Group of Hotels and Resorts, largely based in eastern India.

== Political career ==
Ray was elected as the chairman of the then Rourkela Notified Council in 1985. In the same year he was elected as MLA from Rourkela Constituency (1985–90) and was re-elected again in the year 1990. He served as Minister of Industries in the Janata Dal Government (1990–95) which was headed by Biju Patnaik. Ray is a distant relative to former Odisha CM Nilamani Routray.

Ray was nominated to the upper house of Parliament, i.e., Rajya Sabha in 1996 and continued to be the member of the house for two consecutive terms (1996–2002; 2002–2008). As a parliamentarian, he held several ministry portfolios and was a member of different parliamentary committees.

He also played a role in the foundation of the Biju Janata Dal. Ray considered Biju Patnaik his mentor and Biju spent the last years of his life with him. During his last days, Biju Patnaik had expressed his desire to form a regional party for which he had consultations with several national leaders like Atal Bihari Vajpayee, Lal Krishna Advani, and Pramod Mahajan but could not effectuate it because of his untimely demise.

After the death of Biju Patnaik, Ray and along with other Janata Dal leaders founded Biju Janata Dal. When the party came into existence, Gyan Patnaik, wife of Biju Patnaik, asked him to take the leadership of the party, but he declined and requested someone from the family take the position.

Ray was a sitting member of Odisha Legislative Assembly representing Rourkela Assembly constituency before he left politics for some time in the year 2018.

He was elected from Rajya Sabha in 2026, after being supported by Bharatiya Janata Party.

== Positions held ==
- Chairman, Rourkela Municipality
- Member, Odisha Legislative Assembly (1985–1990)
- Member, Odisha Legislative Assembly (1990–1995)
- Minister of State, Industries (15 Mar 1990 – 24 Jul 1990)
- Minister of State, Industries, excluding textiles and handlooms (24 Jul 1990 – 2 Jan 1991)
- Minister, Industries, excluding textiles and handlooms (2 Jan 1991 – 15 Mar 1995)
- Elected to Rajya Sabha (1996–2002)
- Union MoS (I/C) of the Ministry of Animal Husbandry and Dairying
- Union MoS (I/C) of the Ministry of Food Processing Industries
- Union MoS (I/C) of the Ministry of Coal
- Union MoS of Parliamentary Affairs
- Union MoS of Ministry of Steel
- Elected to Rajya Sabha for the second term (2002–2008)
- Member, Consultative Committee for the Civil Aviation
- Member, Committee on Labour and Welfare
- Member Committee on Labour
- Member, Odisha Legislative Assembly (2014–2019)
- Elected to Rajya Sabha (2026–present)

== Rajya Sabha Election History ==
Position	Party	Constituency	From	To	Tenure
Member of Parliament, Rajya Sabha (1st Term)	BJD	Odisha	3 April 1996	2 April 2002	5 years, 364 days
Member of Parliament, Rajya Sabha (2nd Term)	IND	Odisha	3 April 2002	2 April 2008	5 years, 365 days
Member of Parliament, Rajya Sabha (3rd Term)	IND	Odisha	3 April 2026	2 April 2032	5 years, 365 days
