= Biju Sena =

Biju Sena is a separate political bloc inside political party Biju Janata Dal in the state of Odisha, India. Biju Sena was formed by followers of Biju Patnaik. Since Patnaik's death the movement has lost much of its importance, but still exists.
