= Sushree Devi =

Indian politician (1950–2024)

Smt Sushree Devi
- ସୁଶ୍ରୀ ଦେବୀ

Personal details
- Born: Sushree Devi; 10 January 1950 Kendrapara, Orissa
- Died: January 10, 2024 (aged 74) Cuttack

Smt Sushree Devi, also casually knowns as, Sushree Devi, (10 October 1950 – 10 January 2024) was a prominent Indian politician. She was a member of the Biju Janata Dal party. She served as a Member of Parliament, representing Orissa in the Rajya Sabha, the upper house of the Indian Parliament.

== Early life ==
Sushree Devi was born on 10 October 1950 in Kendrapara, Orissa.

=== Death ===
Sushree Devi, the mother of Former Aul MLA and Odisha Minister Pratap Keshari Deb's, died on January 10, 2024, at her Cuttack residence due to illness. She was 73 years old at the time of her demise.
