= Suryabanshi Suraj =

Indian politician

Minister of Higher Education Government of Odisha
- Incumbent
- Assumed office 12 June 2024
- Chief Minister: Mohan Charan Majhi
- Preceded by: Atanu Sabyasachi Nayak

Minister of Sports & Youth Services Government of Odisha
- Incumbent
- Assumed office 12 June 2024
- Chief Minister: Mohan Charan Majhi
- Preceded by: Tusharkanti Behera

Minister of Odia Language, Literature & Culture Government of Odisha
- Incumbent
- Assumed office 12 June 2024
- Chief Minister: Mohan Charan Majhi
- Preceded by: Aswini Kumar Patra

Member of Odisha Legislative Assembly
- Incumbent
- Assumed office 2022
- Preceded by: Bishnu Sethi
- Constituency: Dhamnagar (SC)

Personal details
- Born: 18 May 1995 (age 31)
- Party: Bharatiya Janata Party
- Parent: Bishnu Sethi (father)
- Education: Bachelor of Technology; Bachelor of Laws

Suryabanshi Suraj is an Indian politician from Bharatiya Janata Party who is serving as member of Odisha Legislative Assembly representing the Dhamnagar Assembly constituency. His father, Bishnu Sethi also served as the member of assembly from the same constituency.

== Early life and education ==
Suraj was born on 18 May 1995 at Bhadrak to Bishnu Sethi, a former politician and poet from Odisha. His mother, Urmila Panigrahi, is a retired headmistress. He completed his B.Tech from Siksha 'O' Anusandhan and pursued LLB (Bachelor of Laws) from Fakir Mohan University.

Before venturing into politics, Suraj was working as a Software Developer at Tata Consultancy Services. Subsequently, he served as a System Engineer at Adani DPCL, Dhamra, contributing to critical infrastructure projects.

== Political career ==
Suryabanshi Suraj's entry into politics was marked by the untimely passing of his father, Bishnu Sethi. In 2022, he contested the by-elections to carry forward his father's legacy and successfully secured victory. Since then, he has been representing the Dhamnagar constituency in the Odisha Legislative Assembly.
