= Aul Assembly constituency =

Constituency of the Odisha legislative assembly in India

Coordinates: 20.67°N 86.64°E

Aul
- Constituency No. 98 for the Odisha Legislative Assembly

Constituency details
- Country: India
- Region: East India
- State: Odisha
- Division: Central Division
- District: Kendrapara
- Lok Sabha constituency: Kendrapara
- Established: 1951
- Total electors: 2,75,973 (Note: as on 2024) (Note: as data published by election commission)
- Reservation: None

Member of Legislative Assembly
- 17th Odisha Legislative Assembly
- Incumbent Pratap Keshari Deb
- Party: Biju Janata Dal
- Elected year: 2024

Aul is a Vidhan Sabha constituency of Kendrapara district, Odisha.

This constituency includes Aul block and Rajkanika block.

== Elected members ==
Vote share of winning candidates
2024	42.37%
2019	57.67%
2014	48.90%
2009	50.00%
2004	53.08%
2000	59.40%
1995	51.09%
1990	56.60%
1985	52.07%
1980	51.96%
1977	57.18%

Since its formation in 1951, 17 elections were held till date.

List of members elected from Aul constituency are:

Year	Member	Party
2024	Pratap Keshari Deb	Biju Janata Dal
2019	Pratap Keshari Deb	Biju Janata Dal
2014	Devendra Sharma	Indian National Congress
2009	Pratap Keshari Deb	Biju Janata Dal
2004	Pratap Keshari Deb	Biju Janata Dal
2000	Pratap Keshari Deb	Biju Janata Dal
1995	Dolagobinda Nayak	Indian National Congress
1990	Sushree Devi	Janata Dal
1985	Dolagobinda Nayak	Indian National Congress
1980	Sarat Kumar Deb	Janata Party (Secular)
1977	Sarat Kumar Deb	Janata Party
1974	Sarat Kumar Deb	Swatantra Party
1971	Sarat Kumar Deb	Swatantra Party
1967	Dibakarnath Sharma	Indian National Congress
1961	Raja Sailendra Narayan Bhanja Deo	Indian National Congress
1957	Raja Sailendra Narayan Bhanja Deo	Indian National Congress
1951	Raja Sailendra Narayan Bhanja Deo	Independent politician

== Election results ==
=== 2024 ===
Voting were held on 1 June 2024 in 4th phase of Odisha Assembly Election & 7th phase of Indian General Election. Counting of votes was on 4 June 2024. In 2024 election, Biju Janata Dal candidate Pratap Keshari Deb defeated Indian National Congress candidate Debasmita Sharma by a margin of 19,628 votes.

2024 Odisha Vidhan Sabha Election, Aul
Party	Candidate	Votes	%	±%
BJD	Pratap Keshari Deb	73,678	42.37	▼15.30
INC	Debasmita Sharma	54,050	31.08	▲5.62
BJP	Krishna Chandra Panda	44,852	25.79	▲10.49
NOTA	None of the above	510	0.29	▼0.03
Majority		19,628	11.29	
Turnout		1,73,882	63.01	
BJD hold				

=== 2019 ===
In 2019 election, Biju Janata Dal candidate Pratap Keshari Deb defeated Indian National Congress candidate Devendra Sharma by a margin of 55,851 votes.

2019 Vidhan Sabha Election, Aul
Party	Candidate	Votes	%	±%
BJD	Pratap Keshari Deb	99,837	57.67	
INC	Devendra Sharma	43,986	25.46	
BJP	Dolagobinda Nayak	26,487	15.3	
NOTA	None of the above	547	0.32	
Majority		55,851	32.21	
Turnout		1,73,106	65.98	
BJD gain from INC				

=== 2014 ===
In 2014 election,Indian National Congress candidate Devendra Sharma defeated Biju Janata Dal candidate Pratap Keshari Deb by a margin of 3,503 votes.

2014 Vidhan Sabha Election: Aul
Party	Candidate	Votes	%	±%
INC	Devendra Sharma	81,254	48.9	−
BJD	Pratap Keshari Deb	77,751	46.8	−
BJP	Braja Sundar Bhuyan	3,914	2.36	−
NOTA	None of the above	1,153	0.69	−
Majority		3,503	2.1	
Turnout		1,73,106	65.98	
INC gain from BJD				

=== 2009 ===
In 2009 election, Biju Janata Dal candidate Pratap Keshari Deb defeated Indian National Congress candidate Devendra Sharma by a margin of 5,877 votes.

2009 Vidhan Sabha Election, Aul
Party	Candidate	Votes	%	±%
BJD	Pratap Keshari Deb	72,012	50.00	▲3.08
INC	Devendra Sharma	66,135	45.92	▲0.76
BJP	Braja Sundar Bhuyan	3,358	2.33	−
Majority		5,877	4.08 (Note: %of total valid votes)	−
Turnout		1,44,062	63.11	▲0.41
Registered electors		2,28,257		
BJD hold				
