= Akshay Panda =

Indian politician

Ganeshwar Kusum

Member of Parliament, Rajya Sabha
- In office 1980-1986
- Constituency: Odisha

Personal details
- Born: 19 September 1937
- Party: Indian National Congress
- Spouse: Saila Bala Panda

Akshay Panda is an Indian politician. He was a Member of Parliament, representing Odisha in the Rajya Sabha, the upper house of India's Parliament, as a member of the Indian National Congress.
