= Abhimanyu Rath =

Indian politician

Member of Parliament, Rajya Sabha
- In office 1956-1962
- Constituency: Odisha

Personal details
- Born: 13 March 1921
- Died: 20 December 1989 (aged 68)
- Party: Ganatantra Parishad

Abhimanyu Rath (1921-1989) was an Indian politician. He was a Member of Parliament, representing Odisha in the Rajya Sabha the upper house of India's Parliament as a member of the Ganatantra Parishad.
