= Surajmal Saha =

Indian politician

Member of Parliament, Rajya Sabha
- In office 1970-1971
- Constituency: Odisha

Personal details
- Born: 20 January 1918
- Died: 15 November 1971 (aged 53)
- Party: Jana Congress
- Spouse: Nanu Devi Saha

Surajmal Saha (1918-1971) was an Indian politician. He was a Member of Parliament, representing Odisha in the Rajya Sabha the upper house of India's Parliament as a member of the Jana Congress.
