= Bhabani Charan Pattanayak =

Indian politician and independence activist (1922–2020)

Padma Shri Bhabani Charan Pattanayak
- ଭବାନୀ ଚରଣ ପଟ୍ଟନାୟକ

Member of Parliament, Rajya Sabha
- In office 1961–1972
- In office 1978–1984
- Constituency: Odisha

Personal details
- Born: 11 May 1922 Andhia, Nimapara, Puri, Bihar and Orissa Province, British India
- Died: 14 May 2020 (aged 98) Bhubaneswar, Khurdha, Odisha, India
- Party: Indian National Congress
- Spouse: Basanta Manjari Pattanayak
- Children: 2 sons and 3 daughters
- Awards: Padma Shri

Padma Shri Bhabani Charan Pattanayak (11 May 1922 – 14 May 2020) was an Indian politician and independence activist. He was a Member of the Parliament of India representing Odisha in the Rajya Sabha, the upper house of the Indian Parliament, for three terms. Pattanayak was elected in 1961, 1966 and 1978. He had earlier taken part in the Indian freedom struggle. In 2018, he was awarded the Padma Shri.

He was also one of the founder members of Nimapara Autonomous College, Nimapara.

He died in Bhubaneswar on May 14, 2020, at the age of 98.
