= Harmohan Singh Yadav =

Indian politician

Chaudhary Harmohan Singh Yadav (or Chaudhary Sahab) (18 October 1921 – 25 July 2012) was an Indian educationist, social worker, independence activist, and an active politician from Samajwadi Party. He received the Shaurya Chakra award for valour from the president of India in 1991, for protecting Sikhs from attack during the 1984 anti-Sikh riots following the assassination of Indira Gandhi.

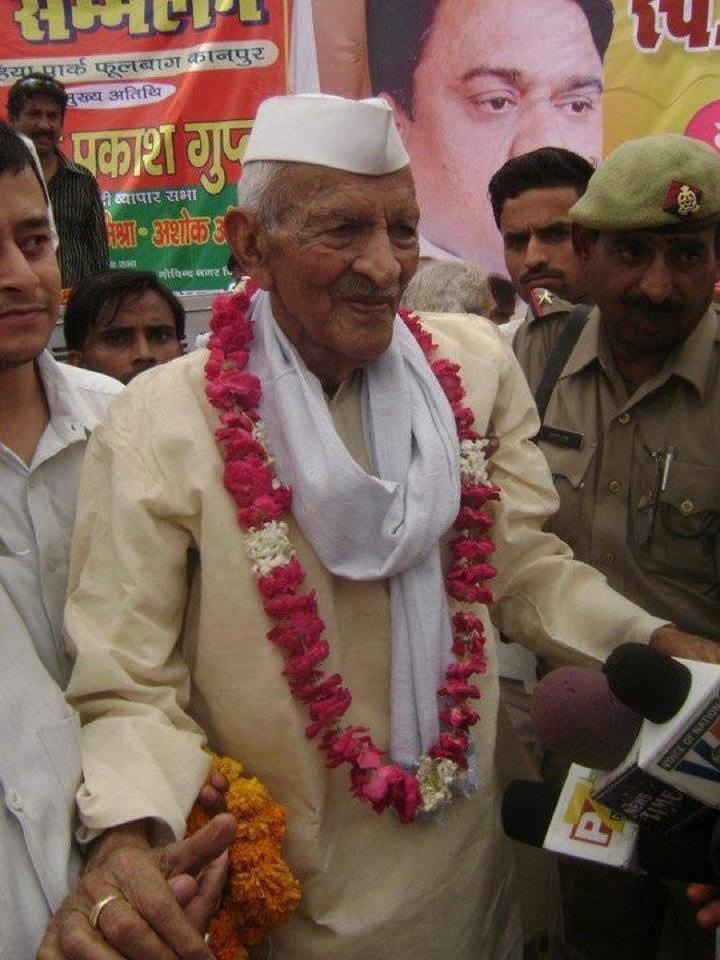
Chaudhary Harmohan Singh Yadav

== Early life ==
Yadav was born on 18 October 1921 at a small village of Kanpur known as Meharban Singh ka Purva. His father was Dhaniram Singh Yadav, a farmer, and his mother Parwati Devi. Brothers Ramgopal Singh and Harmohan Singh were given the nicknames Bade Saheb ("elder master") and Chote Saheb ("younger master"). Harmohan Singh married Gaya Kumari; he had five sons and one daughter.

== Political life ==
Yadav took his first step into the political field at the age of 31 under the supervision of his elder brother and in 1952 he was individually selected as village pradhan of Gujaini twice running. For the first time on 16 May 1970 he was elected as M.L.C. (Member Legislative Council, Vidhan Parishad in Hindi) from Farukhabad-Kanpur. He remained a member of the Legislative Council until 5 May 1982.

On 6 May 1976 he stood for the post of Legislative Assembly and he won the seat. For the third time on 6 May 1982 he got the ticket from Janta Dal and was selected as a member of Legislative Council until 5 May 1990. Working as a senior member of Legislative Council, Singh also remained the chairman of Assurance Committee and Co-operative Bank also from Kanpur. After that he was selected as vice-chairman of Land Development Bank. In 1980, Singh got the ticket for Lok Dal from Bilhore parliament seat, but did not win.

In 1991, for the first time he was elected as a member from Rajya Sabha through the Assembly and became a member of several Parliament Committees. He was chairman of state Lok Dal and member of Janta Dal working committees. In the year 1997 for the second time he was nominated as a member of Rajya Sabha by the President of India, Ramaswamy Venkataraman. Singh retained this post for six years, but he remained a member of Rajya Sabha for a total of 12 years.

Harmohan Singh Yadav was elected as a National Chairman of Akhil Bhartiya Yadav Mahasabha (All-India Yadav Mahasabha) which took place at Mathura. In 1993 he was elected as a Chairman for the second time. In 1994 the meeting of the All-India Yadav Mahasabha took place at Hyderabad, and once again Harmohan Singh Yadav was elected for third time as a Chairman. After the completion of his term D. Nagendra was elected as a Chairman, but the Committee designated Singh as a "guardian". In November 2005 Nagendra suddenly died, and after the request of National Working Committee Singh took over all the responsibilities of that Mahasabha as Chairman..Chaudhary Sahab with help of his son Sukhram Singh had established many educational institutions in and around kanpur which includes Colleges and schools.

== Shaurya Chakra ==
In 1978, Chaudhary Harmohan Singh Yadav and his family moved from Juhi Colony to the Ratan Lal Nal Colony, where most of the population was Sikh. Yadav and his family were on good terms with the Sikhs, who would come to him with their questions and problems. On 31 October 1984, Prime Minister Indira Gandhi was assassinated by her Sikh bodyguards, following which mobs sought out Sikhs to persecute. At the time Yadav was at home in Ratan Lal Nagar with his son Sukhram, and had among them a rifle, carbine, and guns; noting the approaching mobs, they moved towards the terrace, firing into the air and driving back the attackers. Locals Sikhs of the village fled to Yadav's house for protection, and the Yadav family protected them from attack until the mob members were dispersed or arrested. For these actions to protect the lives of Sikhs in the village, in 1991 Indian president Ramaswamy Venkataraman awarded Yadav the Shaurya Chakra, a medal awarded to civilians for acts of valour.

== Cake-cutting controversy ==
In 2013, bailable warrants were served to SP politicians Shivpal Singh Yadav and Irfan Solanki, over video footage of Harmohan Singh Yadav's 2010 birthday party, at which a cake resembling the Indian tri-colour flag was cut. Complainants alleged that this act violated the Prevention of Insults to National Honour Act 1971, and charges were filed against a number of people. By 2013 charges against Harmohan Singh Yadav and another member were dropped due to their deaths in the intervening time.

== Death ==
Yadav died on 24 July 2012 at the age of 91 due to cardiac arrest.
