= Sundarmani Patel =

Indian politician (born 1923)

Member of Parliament, Rajya Sabha
- In office 1962–1974
- Constituency: Odisha

Personal details
- Born: 6 September 1923
- Party: Swatantra Party
- Spouse: Chhayavati Patel

Sundarmani Patel (born 6 September 1923) was an Indian politician. He was a Member of Parliament, representing Odisha in the Rajya Sabha the upper house of India's Parliament as a member of the Swatantra Party.
