= Pramila Bohidar =

Indian politician

Pramila Bohidar is an Indian politician from the Biju Janata Dal party. She represents Orissa in the Rajya Sabha, the upper house of the Parliament of India.
