= Bhubanananda Das =

Indian independence activist

Bhubhananda Das

Bhubanananda Das (1885-1958) was an Indian Independence activist from Orissa. He was a member of the Central Legislative Assembly, Constituent Assembly of India, Provisional Parliament, the Rajya Sabha and the Lok Sabha.

Das was president of the First All Orissa States People's Conference, held at Cuttack in 1931, which was the precursor of the Praja Mandala movement in Orissa.
