= Devendra Sharma (politician) =

Indian politician (1959–2025)

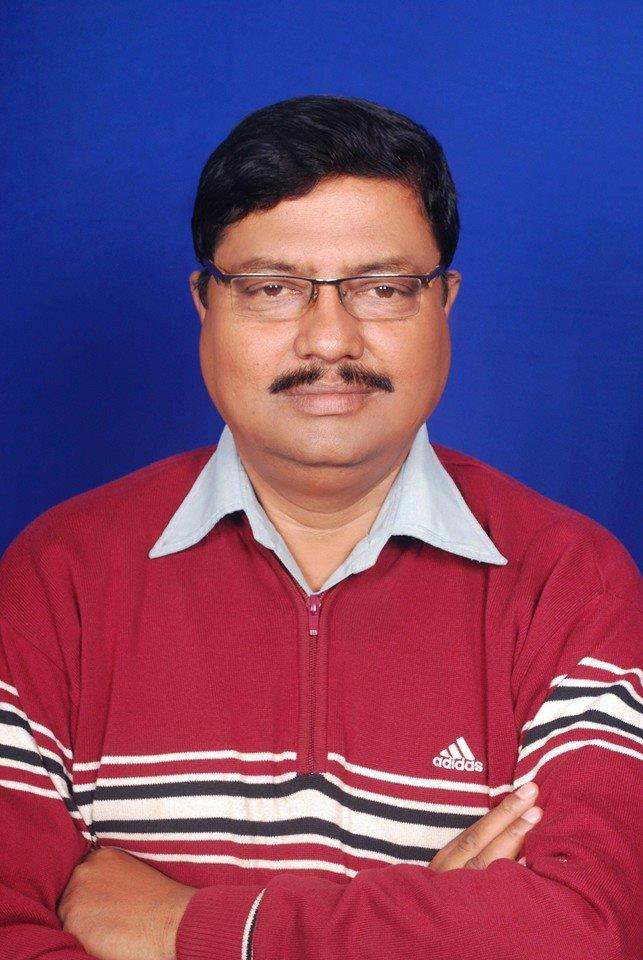

Member, 15th Vidhan Sabha
- Incumbent
- Assumed office 2014–2019
- Constituency: AUL

Member: Odisha Vidhan Sabha
- Incumbent
- Assumed office 28 May 2014 – June 2019

Personal details
- Born: Devendra Sharma; 18 March 1959 Cuttack, Orrisa, India
- Died: 21 March 2025 (aged 66) Bhubaneswar, Odisha, India
- Party: Indian National Congress
- Spouse: Anita Devi (m. 1 July 1993)
- Children: Dr. Debasmita Sharma
- Education: Ravenshaw Collegiate School
- Profession: Politician, social worker, lawyer

Devendra Sharma (18 March 1959 – 21 March 2025) was an Indian politician, who served as a Member of Legislative Assembly. He was one of the strong leaders of Odisha Pradesh Congress Committee and a member of Opposition in the Odisha Legislative Assembly. He was the 15th MLA, elected from the Aul constituency in 2014. He belonged to the Indian National Congress party.

== Early life ==
Sharma was born in Cuttack, Odisha to Dr. Dibakar Sharma, Ex-MLA Aul and Kumari Kamala Devi. He studied at Ravenshaw Collegiate School, Cuttack. He studied law at Mayurbhanj Law College and graduated in 1982. Sharma is the grandson of Kabiraj Jagannath Sharma.

== Political career ==
Sharma followed in the footsteps of his father and was a Member of the Legislative Assembly from Aul, Odisha. He headed the district congress association, Kendrapara, and was a member of AICC and OPCC.

== Sports ==
Sharma was an active member of the Odisha cricket association and president of the district cricket association, Kendrapara. He was mainly known in India and Odisha for his work in the field of football as he was responsible for the recognition of many star female Indian footballers such as Sasmita Malick.

== Social work ==
Sharma ran Dr. Dibakar Sharma girls' high school meant for educating poor girls, and also ran Satya Sai School for the poor in Aul. He was also the President of Aul College.

== Personal life and death ==
Sharma married Kumari Anita Devi of Korkor, on 1 July 1993, the daughter of Zamindar Gagananda Rout and Atara Devi. They had one child together, a daughter named Debasmita Sharma. Sharma was a doctor by profession having completed her MBBS from Indore, Madhya pradesh and schooling from St.Xavier's High School, Kedargouri, Bhubaneswar in India. In 2024, she followed in her father's footsteps and entered politics.

Devendra Sharma died on 21 March 2025, at the age of 66.
