= Meem Afzal =

Indian politician and Urdu Journalist

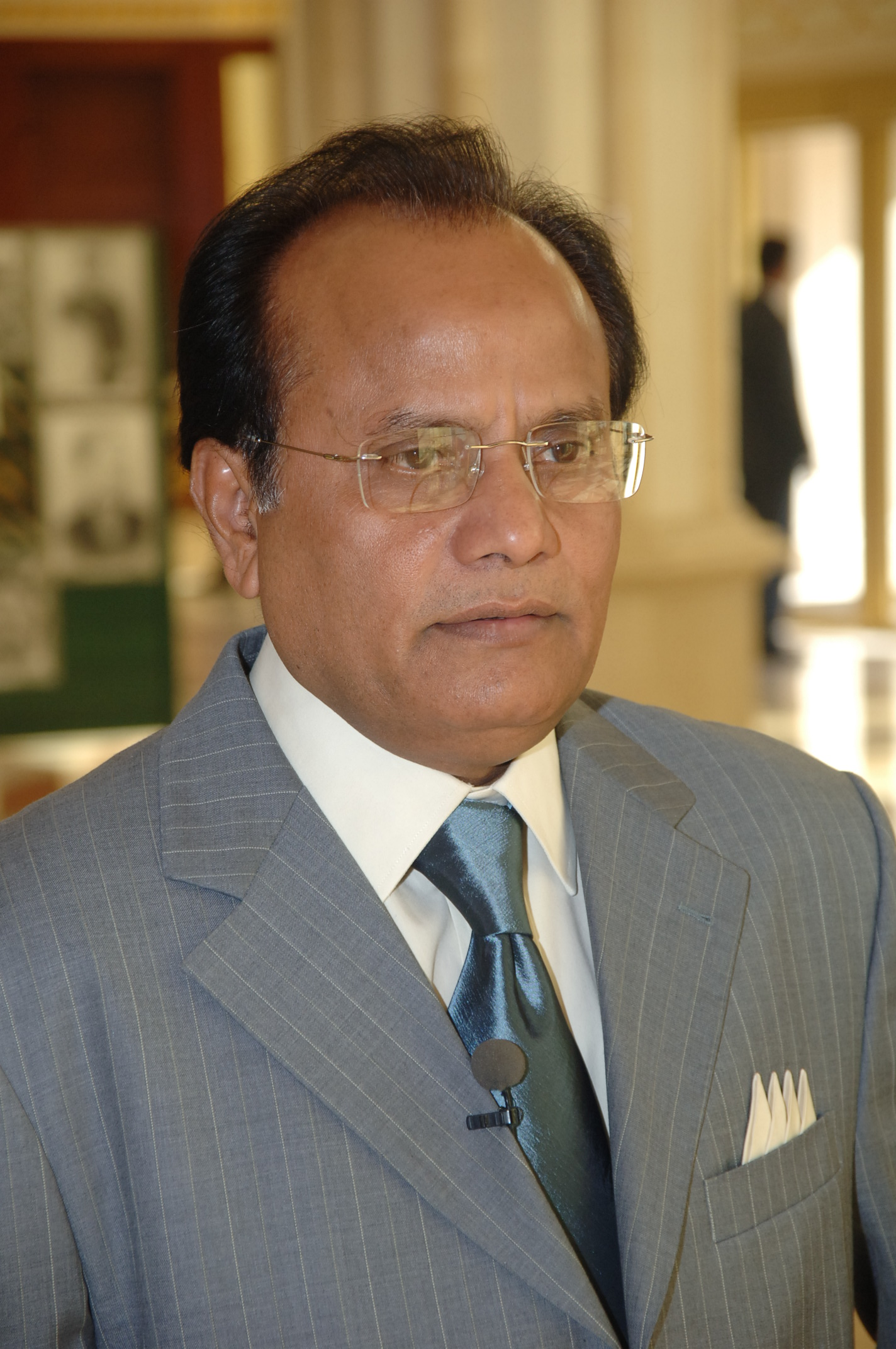

Member of Parliament, Rajya Sabha
- In office 1990–1996
- Constituency: Uttar Pradesh

Vice-chair, Urdu Academy, Delhi
- In office 2004–2005

Ambassador of India
- In office 2005–2010

National Spokesperson. Indian National Congress
- In office 2013 – till date

Personal details
- Born: 1952 (age 73–74) Delhi, India
- Party: Indian National Congress
- Spouse: Shehnaz
- Education: MA (Political Science), BEd
- Alma mater: University of Delhi; Jamia Millia Islamia

Mohammed Afzal, better known as Meem Afzal, is an Indian politician and Urdu journalist. He was a member of parliament and also served as an Indian ambassador to various countries. Currently he is a National Spokesperson of Indian National Congress party and Chief Editor of Akhbar E Nau, an Urdu weekly published from New Delhi.

== Early life ==
Born in Delhi, Meem Afzal completed his M.A in Political Science from Delhi University and B.Ed. from Jamia Milia Islamia. He started his newspaper in the year 1983 which he edits till date and has written nearly five thousand articles and write-ups, which is a record in Urdu journalism. He has interviewed a large number of political leaders in his journalistic carrier spanning over four decades. He was appointed as the president of All India Urdu Editors Conference, member of All India Newspapers Editors Conference, Indian Federation of Small and Medium Newspapers Federation and Legislatures of India.

== Political career ==
Afzal began his political career in 1988 and got elected to Rajya Sabha in 1990 from Janta Dal. As a member of parliament, he raised his voice on matters like enactment of TADA or innocent people arrested under TADA, repression in Kashmir, disappearance of voters’ name from voters lists in the Parliament. He has also worked to promote the Urdu language and Urdu journalism. He also served as member of numerous consultative and standing committees of Parliament and Advisory Committee of Ministry of Information and Broadcasting for Urdu programs.

After disintegration of Janta Dal, he joined Indian National Congress in the year 2000 and was appointed as National Secretary of its Minority Department. In the year 2004, he was nominated as Vice-Chairman of Urdu Academy, Government of Delhi.

In 2005, he was appointed as an Indian ambassador to Angola (also accredited to Republic of Congo and Gabon) during the government headed by Dr. Manmohan Singh. Upon completing his tenure in Angola, he was appointed as an ambassador to Turkmenistan.

After completing his diplomatic assignment in 2010, he joined active politics again and was appointed National Spokesperson of Indian National Congress party by the Congress President Sonia Gandhi in 2013.

== Personal life ==
Afzal is married to Shehnaz since 1977 and has a son Adeel and daughters Sana & Ariba.
