= Vidya Beniwal =

Indian politician

Member of Parliament, Rajya Sabha
- In office 1990-1996
- Constituency: Haryana

Personal details
- Born: 1944 (age 81–82)
- Party: Janata Dal
- Other political affiliations: Indian National Lok Dal

Vidya Beniwal is an Indian politician. She was a Member of Parliament, representing Haryana in the Rajya Sabha the upper house of India's Parliament as a member of the Janata Dal.
