= Kailash Sarang =

Indian politician (died 2020)

Kailash Narayan Sarang (died 14 November 2020) was an Indian politician who served as a member of the Rajya Sabha.
