= Manas Mangaraj =

Indian politician

Manas Ranjan Mangaraj

Member of Parliament, Rajya Sabha
- Incumbent
- Assumed office 2 July 2022
- Preceded by: Prasanna Acharya
- Constituency: Odisha

Personal details
- Born: 19 February 1971 (age 55) Cuttack, Odisha, India
- Party: Biju Janata Dal
- Other political affiliations: Indian National Congress
- Spouse: Gayatribala Panda
- Children: Maneet Mangaraj
- Parents: Nrusing Charan Mangaraj (father); Sradhanjali Mangaraj (mother)
- Education: Berhampur University

Manas Ranjan Mangaraj is an Indian politician and a member of the Rajya Sabha, upper house of the Parliament of India from Odisha as member of the Biju Janata Dal.

== Personal life ==
Mangaraj was born on 19 February 1971 in a Karan family to Nrusing Charan Mangaraj. He married Gayatribala Panda, a writer and journalist.
