= Manmohan Samal =

Indian politician

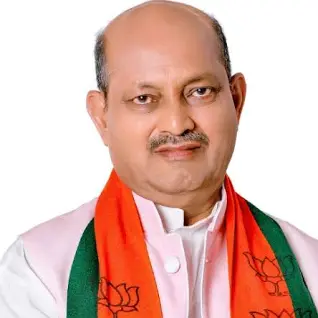

Member of Parliament, Rajya Sabha
- Incumbent
- Assumed office 3 April 2026
- Preceded by: Mamata Mohanta
- Constituency: Odisha

President of Bharatiya Janata Party, Odisha
- Incumbent
- Assumed office 24 March 2023
- National President: JP Nadda; Nitin Nabin
- Preceded by: Samir Mohanty
- In office 1999–2004
- Preceded by: Jual Oram
- Succeeded by: Jual Oram

Minister of Revenue Government of Odisha
- In office 18 May 2004 – 10 December 2008
- Chief Minister: Naveen Patnaik
- Preceded by: Biswabhusan Harichandan
- Succeeded by: Naveen Patnaik

Minister of Food Supplies & Consumer Welfare Government of Odisha
- In office 18 May 2004 – 10 December 2008
- Chief Minister: Naveen Patnaik
- Preceded by: Bed Prakash Agarwal
- Succeeded by: Naveen Patnaik

Member of Odisha Legislative Assembly
- In office 2004–2009
- Preceded by: Manas Ranjan Mallik
- Succeeded by: Rajendra Kumar Das
- Constituency: Dhamnagar

Member of Parliament, Rajya Sabha
- In office 4 April 2000 – 23 May 2004
- Succeeded by: Rudra Narayan Pany
- Constituency: Odisha

Personal details
- Born: 15 April 1959 (age 67) Bhadrak, Odisha, India
- Party: Bharatiya Janata Party
- Spouse: Pranati Samal (m. 1994)
- Children: 1 son, 1 daughter
- Parents: Kambhupani Samal (father); Basant Kumari Samal (mother)
- Education: Bachelor of Arts; Bachelor of Laws
- Alma mater: Utkal University
- Profession: Politician
- Website: https://manmohansamal.in/

Manmohan Samal is an Indian politician currently serving as the President of BJP Odisha since 24-March-2023, a post which he had earlier held from 1999 to 2004. He is also currently serving as a Rajya Sabha member from Odisha.He had won 2004 Odisha Legislative Assembly election from Dhamnagar Assembly constituency and was inducted as the Minister of Revenue, Food Supplies & Consumer Welfare.
