= Jagadish Jani =

Indian politician

Member of Parliament, Rajya Sabha
- In office 1980-1992
- Constituency: Odisha

Personal details
- Born: 3 January 1921
- Died: 23 April 2008 (aged 87)
- Party: Indian National Congress

Jagadish Jani (3 January 1921 – 23 April 2008) was an Indian politician. He was a Member of Parliament, representing Odisha in the Rajya Sabha the upper house of India's Parliament as a member of the Indian National Congress
