= Mira Das =

Indian politician

Member of Parliament, Rajya Sabha
- In office 1990-1996
- Constituency: Odisha

Personal details
- Born: 10 November 1941 (age 84)
- Party: Janata Dal

Mira Das is an Indian politician. She was a Member of Parliament, representing Odisha in the Rajya Sabha the upper house of India's Parliament as a member of the Janata Dal
