= Sarada Mohanty =

Indian politician (1925–2015

Member of Parliament, Rajya Sabha
- In office 1990–1996
- Constituency: Odisha

Personal details
- Born: 7 March 1925
- Died: 8 July 2015 (aged 90)
- Party: Janata Dal
- Spouse: Bidyabati Mohanty

Sarada Mohanty (7 March 1925 – 8 July 2015) was an Indian politician. He was a Member of Parliament, representing Odisha in the Rajya Sabha the upper house of India's Parliament as a member of the Janata Dal.

Mohanty died on 8 July 2015, at the age of 90.
