= Biju Janata Dal =

Political party in India

- Abbreviation: BJD
- Chairperson: Naveen Patnaik
- Rajya Sabha Leader: Manas Ranjan Mangaraj
- Founder: Naveen Patnaik
- Founded: 26 December 1997 (28 years ago)
- Split from: Janata Dal
- Headquarters: Sankha Bhawan; Plot No. 798, Unit - VI, Bhubaneswar – 751001, Odisha, India
- Student wing: Ipsita Sahu.
- Youth wing: Chinmaya Sahu.
- Women's wing: Snehangini Chhuria
- Labour wing: Prafulla Samal
- Peasant's wing: Biju Krusaka Janata Dal
- Ideology: Social democracy; Odia nationalism; Patnaikism
- Political position: Centre-left to centre-right
- Colours: Green
- ECI Status: State Party
- Alliance: National Democratic Alliance (1998–2009)
- Seats in Rajya Sabha: 5 / 245
- Seats in Lok Sabha: 0 / 543
- Seats in Odisha Legislative Assembly: 50 / 147
- Number of states and union territories in government: 0 / 31

Election symbol

Party flag
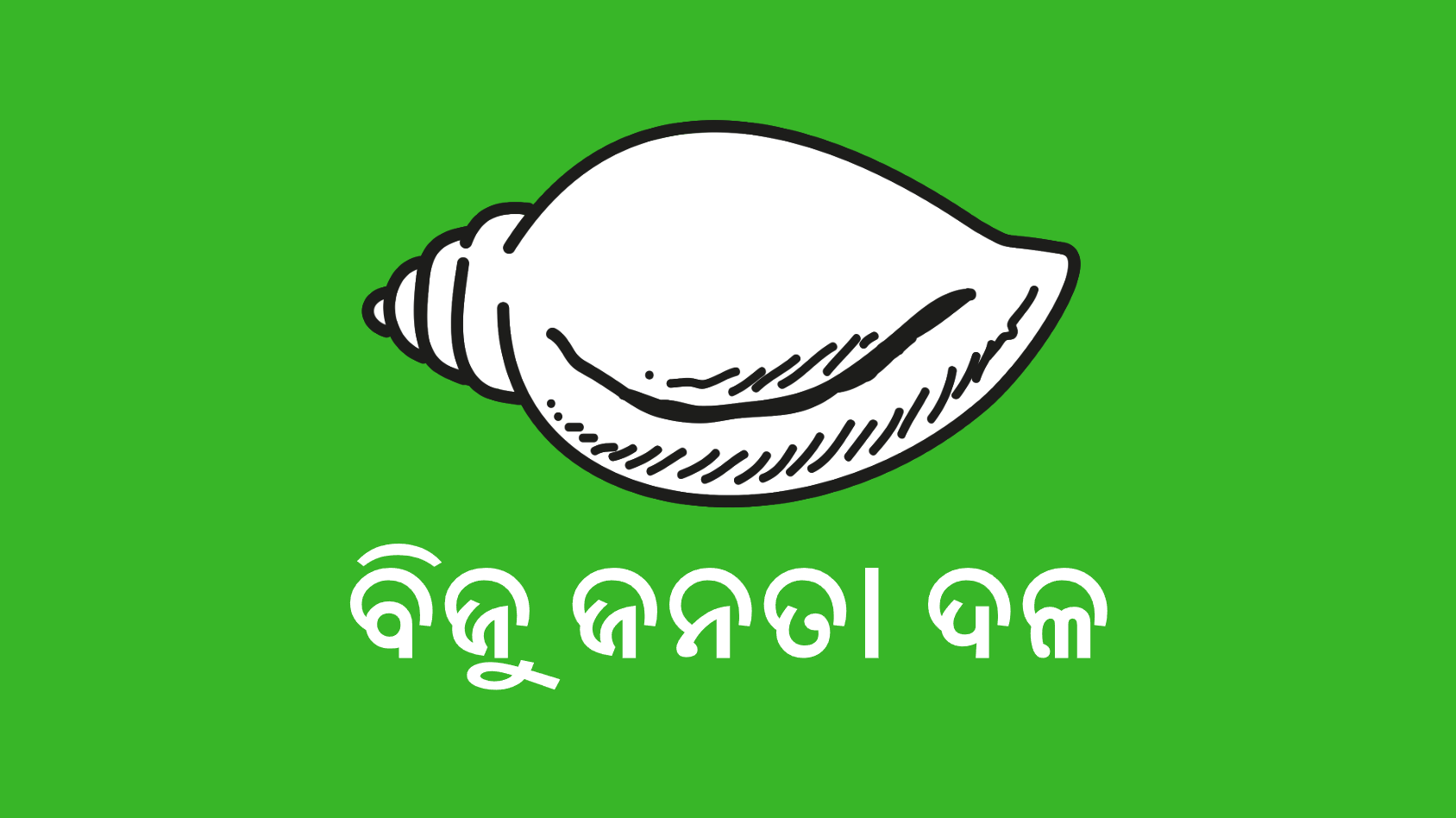

Website
- www.bjdodisha.org.in

The Biju Janata Dal (BJD; lit. 'Biju People's Party') (Note: Odia: ବିଜୁ ଜନତା ଦଳ) is an Indian regional political party with significant influence in the state of Odisha. The party was established to uphold the legacy of former Chief Minister Biju Patnaik, uphold Odia nationalism, and address the unique socio-economic challenges faced by the people of the state. The party aims to provide a platform for regional development, cultural identity, and social welfare.

Under the leadership of its founding president Naveen Patnaik, who served as Chief Minister from 2000 to 2024, the BJD emerged as a dominant political force in Odisha. In its first 11 years it had allied with the NDA, but afterwards it chose to be unallied. The party's governance has been marked by a focus on infrastructure development, poverty alleviation, and various welfare programs aimed at improving the quality of life for its citizens. The BJD has consistently won a significant share of seats in both state and national elections, reflecting its strong grassroots support and commitment to regional issues. The headquarters of the party is located in Forest Park, Bhubaneswar.

== History ==
The Biju Janata Dal (BJD) is a regional political party in Odisha, founded on 26 December 1997, by Naveen Patnaik. The party emerged as a breakaway faction from the Janata Dal following internal conflicts and the decline of the party's influence in the region. The formation of the BJD was largely motivated by the desire to continue the political legacy of Naveen's father, Bijayananda (Biju) Patnaik, a statesman, plus a prominent figure in Odisha's political landscape and a two-time Chief Ministery. The Biju Janata Dal also rose because Orissa had no key regional party at that time. The other main desire was to oppose the Indian National Congress.

When Biju Patnaik was a leader of Janata Party and Janata Dal in Orissa, the State Unit had several differences with the National Unit.

Naveen Patnaik became its founding president. The creation of the BJD aimed to provide a regional alternative to both the Indian National Congress (Congress Party) and the Bharatiya Janata Party (BJP), focusing on issues pertinent to the people of Odisha. It sought to address local concerns, uphold Odia regionalism/nationalism, maintain a distinct Odia identity in politics, and promote development.

== Alliances ==
It had first formed alliance with the BJP and had seat-sharing formulae. Some MPs of BJD were appointed ministers in Atal Bihari Vajpayee's council of ministers. It formed state government of Orissa in 2000 with Naveen Patnaik as Chief Minister. Both BJP, BJD were constituents of Naveen Patnaik's first two ministries. Later in 2009 BJD severed ties with BJP then joined the Third Front, lending some seats to CPI, CPM, NCP. Later around 2014 it chose to be unallied and left even Third Front. Since 2009, Biju Janata Dal is equi-distant from both the key national coalitions. It maintains impartiality, neutral nature, equal distance from both UPA and NDA actually. But there have been some moments when the party had leaned towards BJP plus supported the bills presented by BJP in the Upper House of Parliament.

== Position in political spectrum ==
Biju Janata Dal is never fixed at one political spectrum. It sometimes leans to left, sometimes to right, sometimes remains at centre, to cope with the mood of the public of Orissa/Odisha. This has helped it to garner appreciation from across the state.

== Elections ==
The BJD won nine seats in the 1998 general election and Naveen was named Minister for Mines. In the 1999 general elections, the BJD won 10 seats. The party won a majority of seats in the Odisha Legislative Assembly in the 2000 and 2004 elections in alliance with the Bharatiya Janata Party (BJP). The BJD won 11 Lok Sabha seats in the 2004 elections. In the aftermath of the 2008 Kandhamal riots, the BJD parted ways with the BJP in the Lok Sabha and Assembly elections held in 2009, citing communalism and differences in seat sharing. During the election, BJD won 14 seats and secured a strong 108 legislative seats out of 147 seats in the 2009 Odisha legislative elections. Biju Janata Dal won a huge victory in the 2014 general election, securing 20 of the 21 Odishan Lok Sabha seats and 117 of the 147 Odisha Legislative Assembly seats. They were re-elected to power in Odisha in 2019, winning 112 of the 147 seats in the Odisha state assembly; however, their seats in the Lok Sabha were reduced to 12. In 2022, BJD clean swept elections of Panchayat & urban local bodies in the state. In 2024, they lost all their Lok Sabha seats and also lost the assembly election, with the BJP winning both.

== Leadership ==
The highest decision-making body of the party is its Core Committee.

- Naveen Patnaik - Founder, National Chairman, Leader of the Party in the Odisha Legislative Assembly
- Pinaki Misra - ex Leader of the Party in the Lok Sabha
- Prasanna Acharya - Leader of the Party in the Rajya Sabha
- Niranjan Pujari - Former Minister of Finance, Excise in Government of Odisha
- Pranab Prakash Das - General Secretary (Organisation)
- Sanjay Kumar Das Burma - General Secretary (Headquarters)
- Subhash Chandra Singh - Mayor of Cuttack, Party Treasurer and General Secretary of the Biju Sramika Samukhya
- Chinmoy kumar sahoo - President, Biju Yuba Janata Dal
- Ipshitaa sahoo - President, Biju Chhatra Janata Dal
- Rajeshraj Swain- working President, Biju Chhatra Janata Dal
- Snehangini Chhuria - President, Biju Mahila Janata Dal

== Electoral performance ==
=== Indian general elections ===
Lok Sabha Elections
Year	Lok Sabha	Party leader	Seats contested	Seats won	Change in seats	Percentage of votes	Vote swing	Popular vote	Outcome
1998	12th	Naveen Patnaik	12	9 / 543	▲9	1.00%	Steady	3,669,825	Government
1999	13th	Naveen Patnaik	12	10 / 543	▲1	1.20%	▲0.20%	4,378,536	Government
2004	14th	Naveen Patnaik	12	11 / 543	▲1	1.30%	▲0.10%	5,082,849	Opposition
2009	15th	Naveen Patnaik	18	14 / 543	▲3	1.59%	▲0.29%	6,612,552	Others
2014	16th	Naveen Patnaik	21	20 / 543	▲6	1.73%	▲0.14%	9,489,946	Others
2019	17th	Naveen Patnaik	21	12 / 543	▼8	1.68%	▼0.05%	10,174,021	Others
2024	18th	Naveen Patnaik	21	0 / 543	▼12	1.46%	▼0.22%	9,413,379	Lost

=== State legislative assembly elections ===
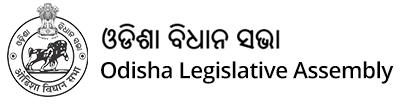
Odisha Legislative Assembly Elections
Year	Assembly	Party leader	Seats contested	Seats won	Change in seats	Percentage of votes	Vote swing	Popular vote	Outcome
2000	12th	Naveen Patnaik	84	68 / 147	▲68	29.40%	Steady	4,151,895	Government
2004	13th	Naveen Patnaik	84	61 / 147	▼7	27.36%	▼2.04%	4,632,280	Government
2009	14th	Naveen Patnaik	129	103 / 147	▲42	38.86%	▲11.50%	6,903,641	Government
2014	15th	Naveen Patnaik	147	117 / 147	▲14	43.35%	▲4.49%	9,335,159	Government
2019	16th	Naveen Patnaik	146	112 / 147	▼5	44.71%	▲1.36%	10,475,697	Government
2024	17th	Naveen Patnaik	147	51 / 147	▼61	40.22%	▼4.49%	10,102,454	Opposition

== List of party leaders ==
=== Presidents ===
No.	Portrait	Name (Birth–Death)	Term in office		
No.	Portrait	Name (Birth–Death)	Assumed office	Left office	Time in office
1		Naveen Patnaik (b. 1946)	26 December 1997	Incumbent	28 years, 199 days

== Legislative leaders ==
=== List of Union Cabinet Ministers ===
No.	Portrait	Name (Birth–Death)	Portfolio	Term in office			Elected constituency (House)	Prime Minister
No.	Portrait	Name (Birth–Death)	Portfolio	Assumed office	Left office	Time in office	Elected constituency (House)	Prime Minister
1		Naveen Patnaik (b. 1946)	Ministry of Steel and Mines	19 March 1998	13 October 1999	1 year, 208 days	Aska (Lok Sabha)	Atal Bihari Vajpayee
1		Naveen Patnaik (b. 1946)	Ministry of Mines and Minerals	13 October 1999	4 March 2000	143 days	Aska (Lok Sabha)	Atal Bihari Vajpayee
2		Arjun Charan Sethi (1941–2020)	Ministry of Water Resources	27 May 2000	22 May 2004	3 years, 361 days	Bhadrak (Lok Sabha)	Atal Bihari Vajpayee

=== List of Union Ministers of State (independent charge) ===
No.	Portrait	Name (Birth–Death)	Portfolio	Term in office			Elected constituency (House)	Prime Minister
No.	Portrait	Name (Birth–Death)	Portfolio	Assumed office	Left office	Time in office	Elected constituency (House)	Prime Minister
1		Dilip Kumar Ray (b. 1954)	Ministry of Coal	20 March 1998	13 October 1999	1 year, 207 days	Odisha (Rajya Sabha)	Atal Bihari Vajpayee
1		Dilip Kumar Ray (b. 1954)	Ministry of Steel	13 October 1999	27 May 2000	227 days	Odisha (Rajya Sabha)	Atal Bihari Vajpayee
2		Braja Kishore Tripathy (b. 1947)	Ministry of Steel	27 May 2000	22 May 2004	3 years, 361 days	Puri (Lok Sabha)	Atal Bihari Vajpayee

=== List of Chief Ministers ===
==== Chief Ministers of Odisha ====
No.	Portrait	Name (Birth–Death)	Term in office			Assembly (Election)	Elected constituency	Ministry
No.	Portrait	Name (Birth–Death)	Assumed office	Left office	Time in office	Assembly (Election)	Elected constituency	Ministry
1		Naveen Patnaik (b. 1946)	5 March 2000	15 May 2004	24 years, 98 days	12th (2000)	Hinjili	Naveen I
1		Naveen Patnaik (b. 1946)	16 May 2004	21 May 2009	24 years, 98 days	13th (2004)	Hinjili	Naveen II
1		Naveen Patnaik (b. 1946)	22 May 2009	20 May 2014	24 years, 98 days	14th (2009)	Hinjili	Naveen III
1		Naveen Patnaik (b. 1946)	21 May 2014	28 May 2019	24 years, 98 days	15th (2014)	Hinjili	Naveen IV
1		Naveen Patnaik (b. 1946)	29 May 2019	11 June 2024	24 years, 98 days	16th (2019)	Hinjili	Naveen V

=== List of Union Ministers of State ===
No.	Portrait	Name (Birth–Death)	Portfolio	Term in office			Elected constituency (House)	Cabinet Minister	Prime Minister
No.	Portrait	Name (Birth–Death)	Portfolio	Assumed office	Left office	Time in office	Elected constituency (House)	Cabinet Minister	Prime Minister
1		Dilip Kumar Ray (b. 1954)	Ministry of Parliamentary Affairs	22 May 1998	22 October 1999	1 year, 153 days	Odisha (Rajya Sabha)	Madan Lal Khurana P. R. Kumaramangalam Pramod Mahajan	Atal Bihari Vajpayee

=== List of leaders of the opposition ===
==== Leaders of the Opposition in the Odisha Legislative Assembly ====
No.	Portrait	Name (Birth–Death)	Term in office			Assembly (Election)	Elected constituency
No.	Portrait	Name (Birth–Death)	Assumed office	Left office	Time in office	Assembly (Election)	Elected constituency
1		Naveen Patnaik (b. 1946)	20 June 2024	Incumbent	2 years, 23 days	17th (2024)	Hinjili

=== List of deputy leaders of the opposition ===
==== Deputy Leaders of the Opposition in the Odisha Legislative Assembly ====
No.	Portrait	Name (Birth–Death)	Term in office			Assembly (Election)	Elected constituency	Leader of the Opposition
No.	Portrait	Name (Birth–Death)	Assumed office	Left office	Time in office	Assembly (Election)	Elected constituency	Leader of the Opposition
1		Prasanna Acharya (b. 1949)	20 June 2024	Incumbent	2 years, 23 days	17th (2024)	Rairakhol	Naveen Patnaik

== See also ==
- Biju Sena, front group of Biju Janata Dal
