= List of Rajya Sabha members from the Bharatiya Janata Party =

The Bharatiya Janata Party (BJP) is one of the two major parties in the political system of Republic of India, the other being the Indian National Congress (INC). As of 2026, it is the country's largest political party in terms of representation in the Lok Sabha (House of people) and Rajya Sabha (Council of States). and is the world's largest political party in terms of primary membership. Established in 1980, the BJP's platform is generally considered as the right-wing of the political spectrum.

The Rajya Sabha (Council of States) is the upper house of the Parliament of India. As of October 2025, 381 BJP leaders have been a member of the Rajya Sabha, out of which 113 are sitting members. Members of the Rajya Sabha are indirectly elected by state and territorial legislatures using single transferable votes, while twelve members are appointed by the President of India for their contributions to art, literature, science, and social services. According to the Constitution of India, the Rajya Sabha has certain special powers being a federal chamber. The Rajya Sabha is not subjected to dissolution unlike the Lok Sabha, and the term of its member is six years.

Thirty seven of the Rajya Sabha members from the BJP are women, out of which fifteen are sitting members – Laxmi Verma, Rekha Sharma, Maya Ivnate, Nirmala Sitharaman, Dharamshila Gupta, Maya Naroliya, Sumitra Valmiki, Kavita Patidar, Ramilaben Bara, Kalpana Saini, Swati Maliwal, Phangnon Konyak and Medha Kulkarni. Eleven of the sitting members from the BJP are members of the Union Council of Ministers of India. Jaswant Singh represented Rajasthan for four terms which amounted to a total tenure length of 7398 days, the longest for any Rajya Sabha member from the BJP. The only other BJP members to serve four terms as a Rajya Sabha member are Arun Jaitley, Pramod Mahajan, Venkaiah Naidu, and Ravi Shankar Prasad.

BJP members have represented 27 states and union territories in the Rajya Sabha. Out of these, Uttar Pradesh has contributed the highest number of members (63). It is followed by Madhya Pradesh and Gujarat with 45 each.

== Current ==
| S.No | Name | Date of Appointment | Date of Retirement | Term | State | Remarks |
|---|---|---|---|---|---|---|
| 1 | R. Krishnaiah | 13-Dec-2024 | Incumbent | 1 year, 303 days | Andhra Pradesh | Elected In By-election |
| 2 | Paka Venkata Satyanarayana | 01-May-2025 | Incumbent | 1 year, 164 days | Andhra Pradesh | Elected In By-election |
| 3 | Tai Tagak | 24-Jun-2026 | Incumbent | 110 days | Arunachal Pradesh | |
| 4 | Jogen Mohan | 10-Apr-2026 | Incumbent | 185 days | Assam | |
| 5 | Terash Gowalla | 10-Apr-2026 | Incumbent | 185 days | Assam | |
| 6 | Kanad Purkayastha | 15-Jun-2025 | Incumbent | 1 year, 119 days | Assam | |
| 7 | Pabitra Margherita | 03-Apr-2022 | Incumbent | 4 years, 192 days | Assam | |
| 8 | Nitin Nabin | 10-Apr-2026 | Incumbent | 185 days | Bihar | |
| 9 | Shivesh Kumar | 10-Apr-2026 | Incumbent | 185 days | Bihar | |
| 10 | Dharamshila Gupta | 03-Apr-2024 | Incumbent | 2 years, 192 days | Bihar | |
| 11 | Bhim Singh | 03-Apr-2024 | Incumbent | 2 years, 192 days | Bihar | |
| 12 | Satish Chandra Dubey | 08-Jul-2022 | Incumbent | 7 years, 3 days | Bihar | |
| 12 | Satish Chandra Dubey | 9 October 2019 | 07-Jul-2022 | 7 years, 3 days | Bihar | Elected In By-election |
| 13 | Shambhu Sharan Patel | 08-Jul-2022 | Incumbent | 4 years, 96 days | Bihar | |
| 14 | Manan Kumar Mishra | 28-Aug-2024 | Incumbent | 2 years, 45 days | Bihar | |
| 15 | Laxmi Verma | 10-Apr-2026 | Incumbent | 185 days | Chhattisgarh | |
| 16 | Raja Devendra Pratap Singh | 03-Apr-2024 | Incumbent | 2 years, 192 days | Chhattisgarh | |
| 17 | Sadanand Tanavade | 29-Jul-2023 | Incumbent | 3 years, 75 days | Goa | |
| 18 | Rajubhai Shukla | 22-Jun-2026 | Incumbent | 112 days | Gujarat | |
| 19 | Mukeshbhai Rathwa | 22-Jun-2026 | Incumbent | 112 days | Gujarat | |
| 20 | Mansingh Parmar | 22-Jun-2026 | Incumbent | 112 days | Gujarat | |
| 21 | Jitendra Kanzariya | 22-Jun-2026 | Incumbent | 112 days | Gujarat | |
| 22 | J. P. Nadda | 03-Apr-2024 | Incumbent | 14 years, 192 days | Gujarat | |
| 22 | J. P. Nadda | 03-Apr-2012 | 02-Apr-2018 | 14 years, 192 days | Himachal Pradesh | |
| 22 | J. P. Nadda | 03-Apr-2018 | 02-Apr-2024 | 14 years, 192 days | Himachal Pradesh | |
| 23 | Govind Dholakia | 03-Apr-2024 | Incumbent | 2 years, 192 days | Gujarat | |
| 24 | Mayankbhai Nayak | 03-Apr-2024 | Incumbent | 2 years, 192 days | Gujarat | |
| 25 | Jasvantsinh Parmar | 03-Apr-2024 | Incumbent | 2 years, 192 days | Gujarat | |
| 26 | S. Jaishankar | 19-Aug-2023 | Incumbent | 7 years, 99 days | Gujarat | |
| 26 | S. Jaishankar | 05-Jul-2019 | 18-Aug-2023 | 7 years, 99 days | Gujarat | Elected In By-election |
| 27 | Kesridevsinh Jhala | 19-Aug-2023 | Incumbent | 3 years, 54 days | Gujarat | |
| 28 | Babubhai Desai | 19-Aug-2023 | Incumbent | 3 years, 54 days | Gujarat | |
| 29 | Sanjay Bhatia | 10-Apr-2026 | Incumbent | 2 years, 185 days | Haryana | |
| 30 | Subhash Barala | 03-Apr-2024 | Incumbent | 2 years, 192 days | Haryana | |
| 31 | Rekha Sharma | 13-Dec-2024 | Incumbent | 1 year, 303 days | Haryana | Elected In By-election |
| 32 | Harsh Mahajan | 03-Apr-2024 | Incumbent | 2 years, 192 days | Himachal Pradesh | |
| 33 | Sikander Kumar | 03-Apr-2022 | Incumbent | 4 years, 192 days | Himachal Pradesh | |
| 34 | Pradip Kumar Varma | 04-May-2024 | Incumbent | 2 years, 161 days | Jharkhand | |
| 35 | Aditya Sahu | 08-Jul-2022 | Incumbent | 4 years, 96 days | Jharkhand | |
| 36 | M. Nagaraja | 26-Jun-2026 | Incumbent | 108 days | Karnataka | |
| 37 | Narayana Bhandage | 03-Apr-2024 | Incumbent | 2 years, 192 days | Karnataka | |
| 38 | Nirmala Sitharaman | 01-Jul-2022 | Incumbent | 10 years, 103 days | Karnataka | |
| 38 | Nirmala Sitharaman | 01-Jul-2016 | 30-Jun-2022 | 10 years, 103 days | Karnataka | |
| 38 | Nirmala Sitharaman | 26-Jun-2014 | 21-Jun-2016 | 1 year, 361 days | Andhra Pradesh | Elected In By-election |
| 39 | Jaggesh | 01-Jul-2022 | Incumbent | 4 years, 103 days | Karnataka | |
| 40 | Lehar Singh Siroya | 01-Jul-2022 | Incumbent | 4 years, 103 days | Karnataka | |
| 41 | Mahesh Kewat | 22-Jun-2026 | Incumbent | 112 days | Madhya Pradesh | |
| 42 | Rajneesh Agrawal | 22-Jun-2026 | Incumbent | 112 days | Madhya Pradesh | |
| 43 | Tarun Chugh | 22-Jun-2026 | Incumbent | 112 days | Madhya Pradesh | |
| 44 | Maya Naroliya | 03-Apr-2024 | Incumbent | 2 years, 192 days | Madhya Pradesh | |
| 45 | Umesh Nath Maharaj | 03-Apr-2024 | Incumbent | 2 years, 192 days | Madhya Pradesh | |
| 46 | Bansilal Gurjar | 03-Apr-2024 | Incumbent | 2 years, 192 days | Madhya Pradesh | |
| 47 | L. Murugan | 03-Apr-2024 | Incumbent | 5 years, 15 days | Madhya Pradesh | |
| 47 | L. Murugan | 27-Sep-2021 | 02-Apr-2024 | 5 years, 15 days | Madhya Pradesh | Elected In By-election |
| 48 | Sumitra Valmiki | 30-Jun-2022 | Incumbent | 4 years, 104 days | Madhya Pradesh | |
| 49 | Kavita Patidar | 30-Jun-2022 | Incumbent | 4 years, 104 days | Madhya Pradesh | |
| 50 | Vinod Tawde | 03-Apr-2026 | Incumbent | 192 days | Maharashtra | |
| 51 | Maya Ivnate | 03-Apr-2026 | Incumbent | 192 days | Maharashtra | |
| 52 | Ramrao Wadkute | 03-Apr-2026 | Incumbent | 192 days | Maharashtra | |
| 53 | Ashok Chavan | 03-Apr-2024 | Incumbent | 2 years, 192 days | Maharashtra | |
| 54 | Medha Kulkarni | 03-Apr-2024 | Incumbent | 2 years, 192 days | Maharashtra | |
| 55 | Ajit Gopchade | 03-Apr-2024 | Incumbent | 2 years, 192 days | Maharashtra | |
| 56 | Anil Bonde | 05-Jul-2022 | Incumbent | 4 years, 99 days | Maharashtra | |
| 57 | Dhananjay Mahadik | 05-Jul-2022 | Incumbent | 4 years, 99 days | Maharashtra | |
| 58 | Adhikarimayum Sharda Devi | 22-Jun-2026 | Incumbent | 112 days | Manipur | |
| 59 | Phangnon Konyak | 03-Apr-2022 | Incumbent | 4 years, 192 days | Nagaland | |
| 60 | Manmohan Samal | 03-Apr-2026 | Incumbent | 192 days | Odisha | |
| 60 | Manmohan Samal | 04-Apr-2000 | 18-May-2004 | 4 years, 44 days | Odisha | Resigned after getting elected as MLA |
| 61 | Sujeet Kumar | 03-Apr-2026 | Incumbent | 1 year, 303 days | Odisha | |
| 61 | Sujeet Kumar | 13-Dec-2024 | 02-Apr-2026 | 1 year, 303 days | Odisha | Elected In By-election |
| 62 | Ashwini Vaishnaw | 04-Apr-2024 | Incumbent | 7 years, 106 days | Odisha | |
| 62 | Ashwini Vaishnaw | 28-Jun-2019 | 03-Apr-2024 | 7 years, 106 days | Odisha | Elected In By-election |
| 63 | Debashish Samantaray | 12-Jun-2026 | Incumbent | 122 days | Odisha | |
| 64 | Raghav Chadha | 27-Apr-2026 | Incumbent | 168 days | Punjab | Merged from AAP |
| 65 | Ashok Mittal | 27-Apr-2026 | Incumbent | 168 days | Punjab | Merged from AAP |
| 66 | Sandeep Pathak | 27-Apr-2026 | Incumbent | 168 days | Punjab | Merged from AAP |
| 67 | Harbhajan Singh | 27-Apr-2026 | Incumbent | 168 days | Punjab | Merged from AAP |
| 68 | Vikramjit Singh Sahney | 27-Apr-2026 | Incumbent | 168 days | Punjab | Merged from AAP |
| 69 | Rajinder Gupta | 27-Apr-2026 | Incumbent | 168 days | Punjab | Merged from AAP |
| 70 | Satish Poonia | 22-Jun-2026 | Incumbent | 112 days | Rajasthan | |
| 71 | Alka Gurjar | 22-Jun-2026 | Incumbent | 112 days | Rajasthan | |
| 72 | Chunnilal Garasiya | 04-Apr-2024 | Incumbent | 2 years, 191 days | Rajasthan | |
| 73 | Madan Rathore | 04-Apr-2024 | Incumbent | 2 years, 191 days | Rajasthan | |
| 74 | Ghanshyam Tiwari | 05-Jul-2022 | Incumbent | 4 years, 99 days | Rajasthan | |
| 75 | Dorjee Tshering Lepcha | 24-Feb-2024 | Incumbent | 2 years, 230 days | Sikkim | |
| 76 | Rajib Bhattacharjee | 04-Sep-2024 | Incumbent | 2 years, 38 days | Tripura | Elected In By-election |
| 77 | Dharmpal Singh | 26-Nov-2026 | Incumbent | −45 days | Uttar Pradesh | |
| 78 | Radhakant Ojha | 26-Nov-2026 | Incumbent | −45 days | Uttar Pradesh | |
| 79 | Prakash Pal | 26-Nov-2026 | Incumbent | −45 days | Uttar Pradesh | |
| 80 | Vidyasagar Sonkar | 26-Nov-2026 | Incumbent | −45 days | Uttar Pradesh | |
| 81 | Gopi Krishna Pandey | 26-Nov-2026 | Incumbent | −45 days | Uttar Pradesh | |
| 82 | Priyanka Singh Rawat | 26-Nov-2026 | Incumbent | −45 days | Uttar Pradesh | |
| 83 | Ram Pratap Singh Chauhan | 26-Nov-2026 | Incumbent | −45 days | Uttar Pradesh | |
| 84 | Shruti Gangwar | 26-Nov-2026 | Incumbent | −45 days | Uttar Pradesh | |
| 85 | Sudhanshu Trivedi | 03-Apr-2024 | Incumbent | 7 years, 3 days | Uttar Pradesh | |
| 85 | Sudhanshu Trivedi | 09-Oct-2019 | 02-Apr-2024 | 7 years, 3 days | Uttar Pradesh | Elected In By-election |
| 86 | Sanjay Seth | 03-Apr-2024 | Incumbent | 2 years, 192 days | Uttar Pradesh | |
| 86 | Sanjay Seth | 16-Sep-2019 | 04-Jul-2022 | 4 years, 100 days | Uttar Pradesh | Elected In By-election |
| 87 | Naveen Jain | 03-Apr-2024 | Incumbent | 2 years, 192 days | Uttar Pradesh | |
| 88 | Sadhana Singh | 03-Apr-2024 | Incumbent | 2 years, 192 days | Uttar Pradesh | |
| 89 | Sangeeta Balwant | 03-Apr-2024 | Incumbent | 2 years, 192 days | Uttar Pradesh | |
| 90 | Ratanjit Pratap Narain Singh | 03-Apr-2024 | Incumbent | 2 years, 192 days | Uttar Pradesh | |
| 91 | Chaudhary Tejveer Singh | 03-Apr-2024 | Incumbent | 2 years, 192 days | Uttar Pradesh | |
| 92 | Amarpal Maurya | 03-Apr-2024 | Incumbent | 2 years, 192 days | Uttar Pradesh | |
| 93 | Laxmikant Bajpai | 05-Jul-2022 | Incumbent | 4 years, 99 days | Uttar Pradesh | |
| 94 | Radha Mohan Das Agarwal | 05-Jul-2022 | Incumbent | 4 years, 99 days | Uttar Pradesh | |
| 95 | Surendra Singh Nagar | 05-Jul-2022 | Incumbent | 7 years, 26 days | Uttar Pradesh | |
| 95 | Surendra Singh Nagar | 16-Sep-2019 | 04-Jul-2022 | 7 years, 26 days | Uttar Pradesh | Elected In By-election |
| 96 | Sangeeta Yadav | 05-Jul-2022 | Incumbent | 4 years, 99 days | Uttar Pradesh | |
| 97 | Darshana Singh | 05-Jul-2022 | Incumbent | 4 years, 99 days | Uttar Pradesh | |
| 98 | Baburam Nishad | 05-Jul-2022 | Incumbent | 4 years, 99 days | Uttar Pradesh | |
| 99 | K. Laxman | 05-Jul-2022 | Incumbent | 4 years, 99 days | Uttar Pradesh | |
| 100 | Mithlesh Kumar | 05-Jul-2022 | Incumbent | 4 years, 99 days | Uttar Pradesh | |
| 101 | Dinesh Arya | 26-Nov-2026 | Incumbent | −45 days | Uttarakhand | |
| 102 | Mahendra Bhatt | 03-Apr-2024 | Incumbent | 2 years, 192 days | Uttarakhand | |
| 103 | Kalpana Saini | 05-Jul-2022 | Incumbent | 4 years, 99 days | Uttarakhand | |
| 104 | Rahul Sinha | 03-Apr-2026 | Incumbent | 192 days | West Bengal | |
| 105 | Samik Bhattacharya | 03-Apr-2024 | Incumbent | 2 years, 192 days | West Bengal | |
| 106 | Ananta Maharaj | 19-Aug-2023 | Incumbent | 3 years, 54 days | West Bengal | |
| 107 | Sushmita Dev | 17-Jul-2026 | Incumbent | 87 days | West Bengal | Elected In By-election |
| 108 | Sukhendu Sekhar Roy | 17-Jul-2026 | Incumbent | 87 days | West Bengal | Elected In By-election |
| 109 | Prakash Chik Baraik | 17-Jul-2026 | Incumbent | 87 days | West Bengal | Elected In By-election |
| 110 | Koel Mallick | 10-Oct-2026 | Incumbent | 2 days | West Bengal | Elected In By-election |
| 111 | Swati Maliwal | 27-Apr-2026 | Incumbent | 168 days | Delhi | Merged from AAP |
| 112 | Sat Paul Sharma | 25-Oct-2025 | Incumbent | 352 days | Jammu And Kashmir | |
| 113 | S. Selvaganapathy | 07-Oct-2021 | Incumbent | 5 years, 5 days | Puducherry | |
| 114 | Harsh Vardhan Shringla | 13-Jul-2025 | Incumbent | 1 year, 91 days | Nominated | |
| 115 | Ujjwal Nikam | 13-Jul-2025 | Incumbent | 1 year, 91 days | Nominated | |
| 116 | C. Sadanandan Master | 13-Jul-2025 | Incumbent | 1 year, 91 days | Nominated | |
| 117 | Satnam Singh Sandhu | 30-Jan-2024 | Incumbent | 2 years, 255 days | Nominated | |
| 118 | Ghulam Ali Khatana | 14-Sep-2022 | Incumbent | 4 years, 28 days | Nominated | |

== Former ==
| Name | Date of Appointment | Date of Retirement | Term | State | Remarks |
|---|---|---|---|---|---|
| Daggubati Venkateswara Rao | 27-Jan-1998 | 09-Apr-2002 | 4 years, 72 days | Andhra Pradesh | Merged From TDP(NTR) |
| Suresh Prabhu | 22-Jun-2016 | 21-Jun-2022 | 7 years, 204 days | Andhra Pradesh | |
| Suresh Prabhu | 29-Nov-2014 | 21-Jun-2016 | 7 years, 204 days | Haryana | Elected in By-election |
| Sujana Chowdary | 20-Jun-2019 | 21-Jun-2022 | 3 years, 1 day | Andhra Pradesh | Merged From TDP |
| T. G. Venkatesh | 20-Jun-2019 | 21-Jun-2022 | 3 years, 1 day | Andhra Pradesh | Merged From TDP |
| C. M. Ramesh | 20-Jun-2019 | 03-Apr-2024 | 4 years, 288 days | Andhra Pradesh | Merged From TDP |
| Nabam Rebia | 24-Jun-2020 | 23-Jun-2026 | 5 years, 364 days | Arunachal Pradesh | |
| Indramoni Bora | 15-Jun-2001 | 14-Jun-2007 | 5 years, 364 days | Assam | |
| Kamakhya Prasad Tasa | 15-Jun-2019 | 05-Jun-2024 | 4 years, 356 days | Assam | Elected to Lok Sabha |
| Bhubaneswar Kalita | 10-Apr-2020 | 09-Apr-2026 | 5 years, 364 days | Assam | |
| Biswajit Daimary | 22-Feb-2021 | 12-May-2021 | 79 days | Assam | Elected in By-election; Resigned after getting elected as MLA |
| Sarbananda Sonowal | 01-Oct-2021 | 05-Jun-2024 | 2 years, 248 days | Assam | Elected to Lok Sabha |
| Mission Ranjan Das | 28-Aug-2024 | 14-Jun-2025 | 290 days | Assam | Elected in By-election |
| Rameswar Teli | 28-Aug-2024 | 09-Apr-2026 | 1 year, 224 days | Assam | Elected In By-election |
| Ram Lakhan Prasad Gupta | 06-Apr-1980 | 02-Apr-1984 | 3 years, 362 days | Bihar | Merged From JP |
| Ashwani Kumar | 07-Jul-1986 | 06-Jul-1992 | 12 years, 0 days | Bihar | |
| Ashwani Kumar | 07-Jul-1980 | 06-Jul-1986 | 12 years, 0 days | Bihar | |
| Jagdambi Prasad Yadav | 03-Apr-1982 | 02-Apr-1988 | 5 years, 365 days | Bihar | |
| Kailashpati Mishra | 10-Apr-1984 | 09-Apr-1990 | 5 years, 364 days | Bihar | |
| Kameshwar Paswan | 10-Apr-1990 | 09-Apr-1996 | 5 years, 365 days | Bihar | |
| Janardan Yadav | 03-Apr-1994 | 02-Apr-2000 | 5 years, 365 days | Bihar | |
| Shatrughan Sinha | 10-Apr-1996 | 09-Apr-2002 | 11 years, 365 days | Bihar | |
| Shatrughan Sinha | 10-Apr-2002 | 09-Apr-2008 | 11 years, 365 days | Bihar | |
| Ravi Shankar Prasad | 03-Apr-2000 | 02-Apr-2006 | 19 years, 50 days | Bihar | |
| Ravi Shankar Prasad | 03-Apr-2006 | 02-Apr-2012 | 19 years, 50 days | Bihar | |
| Ravi Shankar Prasad | 03-Apr-2012 | 02-Apr-2018 | 19 years, 50 days | Bihar | |
| Ravi Shankar Prasad | 03-Apr-2018 | 23-May-2019 | 19 years, 50 days | Bihar | |
| Jai Narain Prasad Nishad | 08-Jul-2004 | 26-Mar-2008 | 3 years, 262 days | Bihar | Disqualified |
| C. P. Thakur | 10-Apr-2014 | 09-Apr-2020 | 11 years, 365 days | Bihar | |
| C. P. Thakur | 10-Apr-2008 | 09-Apr-2014 | 11 years, 365 days | Bihar | |
| Rajiv Pratap Rudy | 08-Jul-2010 | 16-May-2014 | 5 years, 316 days | Bihar | Elected to Lok Sabha |
| Rajiv Pratap Rudy | 04-Jul-2008 | 07-Jul-2010 | 5 years, 316 days | Bihar | Elected in By-election |
| Ravindra Kishore Sinha | 10-Apr-2014 | 09-Apr-2020 | 5 years, 365 days | Bihar | |
| Ram Kripal Yadav | 12-Mar-2014 | 16-May-2014 | 65 days | Bihar | Merged From RJD; Elected to Lok Sabha |
| Gopal Narayan Singh | 08-Jul-2016 | 07-Jul-2022 | 5 years, 364 days | Bihar | |
| Vivek Thakur | 10-Apr-2020 | 04-Jun-2024 | 4 years, 55 days | Bihar | Elected to Lok Sabha |
| Sushil Kumar Modi | 07-Dec-2020 | 02-Apr-2024 | 3 years, 117 days | Bihar | Elected in By-election |
| Lakkhiram Agarwal | 10-Apr-1996 | 09-Apr-2002 | 11 years, 364 days | Chhattisgarh | Elected as Rajya Sabha members from Madhya Pradesh continued as RS member from Chhattisgarh from 1-Nov-2000 onwards |
| Lakkhiram Agarwal | 10-Apr-1990 | 09-Apr-1996 | 11 years, 364 days | Madhya Pradesh | |
| Dilip Singh Judeo | 30-Jun-2004 | 16-May-2009 | 10 years, 320 days | Chhattisgarh | Elected to Lok Sabha |
| Dilip Singh Judeo | 30-Jun-1998 | 29-Jun-2004 | 10 years, 320 days | Chhattisgarh | Elected as Rajya Sabha members from Madhya Pradesh continued as RS member from Chhattisgarh from 1-Nov-2000 onwards |
| Shreegopal Vyas | 03-Apr-2006 | 02-Apr-2012 | 5 years, 365 days | Chhattisgarh | |
| Shiv Pratap Singh | 10-Apr-2008 | 09-Apr-2014 | 5 years, 364 days | Chhattisgarh | |
| Nand Kumar Sai | 30-Jun-2010 | 29-Jun-2016 | 6 years, 330 days | Chhattisgarh | |
| Nand Kumar Sai | 04-Aug-2009 | 29-Jun-2010 | 6 years, 330 days | Chhattisgarh | Elected in By-election |
| Bhushan Lal Jangde | 03-Apr-2012 | 02-Apr-2018 | 5 years, 364 days | Chhattisgarh | |
| Ranvijay Singh Judeo | 10-Apr-2014 | 09-Apr-2020 | 5 years, 365 days | Chhattisgarh | |
| Ramvichar Netam | 30-Jun-2016 | 29-Jun-2022 | 5 years, 364 days | Chhattisgarh | |
| Saroj Pandey | 03-Apr-2018 | 02-Apr-2024 | 5 years, 365 days | Chhattisgarh | |
| Vinay Dinu Tendulkar | 29-Jul-2017 | 28-Jul-2023 | 5 years, 365 days | Goa | |
| Shankersinh Vaghela | 10-Apr-1984 | 27-Nov-1989 | 5 years, 231 days | Gujarat | Elected to Lok Sabha |
| Anant Dave | 10-Apr-1990 | 09-Apr-1996 | 11 years, 364 days | Gujarat | |
| Anant Dave | 10-Apr-1996 | 09-Apr-2002 | 11 years, 364 days | Gujarat | |
| Gopalsinh G Solanki | 10-Apr-1990 | 09-Apr-1996 | 11 years, 364 days | Gujarat | |
| Gopalsinh G Solanki | 10-Apr-1996 | 09-Apr-2002 | 11 years, 364 days | Gujarat | |
| Chimanbhai Haribhai Shukla | 19-Aug-1993 | 18-Aug-1999 | 5 years, 364 days | Gujarat | |
| Kanaksinh Mangrola | 03-Apr-1994 | 02-Nov-1996 | 2 years, 213 days | Gujarat | Resigned |
| Anandiben Patel | 03-Apr-1994 | 12-Mar-1998 | 3 years, 343 days | Gujarat | Resigned after getting elected as MLA |
| Bangaru Laxman | 10-Apr-1996 | 09-Apr-2002 | 5 years, 364 days | Gujarat | |
| Prafull Goradia | 07-Apr-1998 | 02-Apr-2000 | 1 year, 361 days | Gujarat | Elected in By-election |
| Lalitbhai Mehta | 19-Aug-1999 | 18-Aug-2005 | 5 years, 364 days | Gujarat | |
| Savita Sharda | 19-Aug-1999 | 18-Aug-2005 | 5 years, 364 days | Gujarat | |
| Lekhraj Bachani | 03-Apr-2000 | 02-Apr-2006 | 5 years, 364 days | Gujarat | |
| A. K. Patel | 03-Apr-2000 | 02-Apr-2006 | 5 years, 364 days | Gujarat | |
| Jayantilal Barot | 10-Apr-2002 | 09-Apr-2008 | 5 years, 365 days | Gujarat | |
| Keshubhai Patel | 10-Apr-2002 | 09-Apr-2008 | 5 years, 365 days | Gujarat | |
| Jana Krishnamurthi | 10-Apr-2002 | 25-Sep-2007 | 5 years, 168 days | Gujarat | Died in office |
| Suryakant Acharya | 19-Aug-2005 | 21-Dec-2009 | 4 years, 124 days | Gujarat | Died in office |
| Surendra Motilal Patel | 19-Aug-2005 | 18-Aug-2011 | 5 years, 364 days | Gujarat | |
| Vijay Rupani | 03-Apr-2006 | 02-Apr-2012 | 5 years, 365 days | Gujarat | |
| Kanjibhai Patel | 03-Apr-2006 | 02-Apr-2012 | 5 years, 365 days | Gujarat | |
| Bharatsinh Parmar | 10-Apr-2008 | 09-Apr-2014 | 5 years, 364 days | Gujarat | |
| Parshottam Rupala | 03-Apr-2018 | 02-Apr-2024 | 7 years, 306 days | Gujarat | |
| Parshottam Rupala | 01-Jun-2016 | 02-Apr-2018 | 7 years, 306 days | Gujarat | Elected in By-election |
| Parshottam Rupala | 10-Apr-2008 | 09-Apr-2014 | 5 years, 364 days | Gujarat | |
| Natubhai Thakore | 10-Apr-2008 | 09-Apr-2014 | 5 years, 364 days | Gujarat | |
| Pravin Naik | 19-Feb-2010 | 18-Aug-2011 | 1 year, 180 days | Gujarat | |
| Smriti Irani | 19-Aug-2017 | 29-May-2019 | 7 years, 283 days | Gujarat | Elected to Lok Sabha |
| Smriti Irani | 19-Aug-2011 | 18-Aug-2017 | 7 years, 283 days | Gujarat | |
| Dilip Pandya | 19-Aug-2011 | 18-Aug-2017 | 5 years, 364 days | Gujarat | |
| Mansukh Mandaviya | 03-Apr-2018 | 02-Apr-2024 | 11 years, 365 days | Gujarat | |
| Mansukh Mandaviya | 03-Apr-2012 | 02-Apr-2018 | 11 years, 365 days | Gujarat | |
| Shankarbhai Vegad | 03-Apr-2012 | 02-Apr-2018 | 5 years, 364 days | Gujarat | |
| Shambhuprasad Tundiya | 10-Apr-2014 | 09-Apr-2020 | 5 years, 365 days | Gujarat | |
| Chunibhai K Gohel | 10-Apr-2014 | 09-Apr-2020 | 5 years, 365 days | Gujarat | |
| Lal Sinh Vadodia | 10-Apr-2014 | 09-Apr-2020 | 5 years, 365 days | Gujarat | |
| Amit Shah | 19-Aug-2017 | 29-May-2019 | 1 year, 283 days | Gujarat | Elected to Lok Sabha |
| Jugalji Thakor | 06-Jul-2019 | 18-Aug-2023 | 4 years, 43 days | Gujarat | Elected in By-election |
| Abhay Bharadwaj | 22-Jun-2020 | 01-Dec-2020 | 162 days | Gujarat | Died in office |
| Dineshchandra Anavadiya | 22-Feb-2021 | 18-Aug-2023 | 2 years, 177 days | Gujarat | Elected in By-election |
| Ramilaben Bara | 22-Jun-2020 | 21-Jun-2026 | 5 years, 364 days | Gujarat | |
| Narhari Amin | 22-Jun-2020 | 21-Jun-2026 | 5 years, 364 days | Gujarat | |
| Rambhai Mokariya | 23-Feb-2021 | 21-Jun-2026 | 5 years, 118 days | Gujarat | Elected in By-election |
| Chaudhary Birender Singh | 02-Aug-2016 | 20-Jan-2020 | 5 years, 52 days | Haryana | Resigned |
| Chaudhary Birender Singh | 29-Nov-2014 | 01-Aug-2016 | 5 years, 52 days | Haryana | Elected in By-election |
| D. P. Vats | 03-Apr-2018 | 02-Apr-2024 | 5 years, 365 days | Haryana | |
| Ram Kumar Kashyap | 26-Jun-2019 | 07-Nov-2019 | 134 days | Haryana | Merged From INLD; Resigned after getting elected as MLA |
| Dushyant Kumar Gautam | 19-Mar-2020 | 01-Aug-2022 | 5 years, 365 days | Haryana | Elected in By-election |
| Krishan Lal Panwar | 02-Aug-2022 | 14-Oct-2024 | 2 years, 73 days | Haryana | Resigned after getting elected as MLA |
| Ram Chander Jangra | 10-Apr-2020 | 09-Apr-2026 | 5 years, 364 days | Haryana | |
| Kiran Choudhry | 28-Aug-2024 | 09-Apr-2026 | 1 year, 224 days | Haryana | Elected in By-election |
| Mohinder Kaur | 06-Apr-1980 | 09-Apr-1984 | 4 years, 3 days | Himachal Pradesh | Merged BJP From JP |
| Krishan Lal Sharma | 10-Apr-1990 | 09-Apr-1996 | 5 years, 365 days | Himachal Pradesh | |
| Maheshwar Singh | 03-Apr-1992 | 02-Apr-1998 | 5 years, 364 days | Himachal Pradesh | |
| Kripal Parmar | 03-Apr-2000 | 02-Apr-2006 | 5 years, 364 days | Himachal Pradesh | |
| Suresh Bhardwaj | 10-Apr-2002 | 09-Apr-2008 | 5 years, 365 days | Himachal Pradesh | |
| Shanta Kumar | 10-Apr-2008 | 09-Apr-2014 | 5 years, 364 days | Himachal Pradesh | |
| Bimla Kashyap Sood | 03-Apr-2010 | 02-Apr-2016 | 5 years, 365 days | Himachal Pradesh | |
| Indu Goswami | 10-Apr-2020 | 09-Apr-2026 | 5 years, 364 days | Himachal Pradesh | |
| Shamsheer Singh Manhas | 11-Feb-2015 | 10-Feb-2021 | 5 years, 365 days | Jammu and Kashmir | |
| Parmeshwar Kumar Agarwalla | 08-Jul-1998 | 07-Jul-2004 | 11 years, 365 days | Jharkhand | Elected as Rajya Sabha members from Bihar continued as RS member from Jharkhand from 15-Nov-2000 onwards |
| Parmeshwar Kumar Agarwalla | 08-Jul-1992 | 07-Jul-1998 | 11 years, 365 days | Bihar | |
| S. S. Ahluwalia | 03-Apr-2006 | 02-Apr-2012 | 11 years, 365 days | Jharkhand | |
| S. S. Ahluwalia | 03-Apr-2000 | 02-Apr-2006 | 11 years, 365 days | Jharkhand | Elected as Rajya Sabha members from Bihar continued as RS member from Jharkhand from 15-Nov-2000 onwards |
| Abhay Kant Prasad | 05-Jun-2002 | 07-Jul-2004 | 2 years, 32 days | Jharkhand | Elected in By-election |
| Ajay Maroo | 10-Apr-2002 | 09-Apr-2008 | 5 years, 365 days | Jharkhand | |
| Devdas Apte | 02-Jul-2002 | 09-Apr-2008 | 5 years, 282 days | Jharkhand | Elected in By-election |
| Yashwant Sinha | 08-Jul-2004 | 16-May-2009 | 4 years, 312 days | Jharkhand | Elected to Lok Sabha |
| Jai Prakash Narayan Singh | 10-Apr-2008 | 09-Apr-2014 | 5 years, 355 days | Jharkhand | |
| Mahesh Poddar | 08-Jul-2016 | 07-Jul-2022 | 5 years, 364 days | Jharkhand | |
| Mukhtar Abbas Naqvi | 08-Jul-2016 | 07-Jul-2022 | 5 years, 364 days | Jharkhand | |
| Mukhtar Abbas Naqvi | 05-Jul-2010 | 04-Jul-2016 | 5 years, 365 days | Uttar Pradesh | |
| Mukhtar Abbas Naqvi | 26-Nov-2002 | 25-Nov-2008 | 5 years, 365 days | Uttar Pradesh | |
| Sameer Oraon | 04-May-2018 | 03-May-2024 | 5 years, 365 days | Jharkhand | |
| Deepak Prakash | 22-Jun-2020 | 21-Jun-2026 | 5 years, 364 days | Jharkhand | |
| M. Rajasekara Murthy | 03-Apr-2000 | 10-Nov-2005 | 5 years, 221 days | Karnataka | Resigned |
| K. B. Shanappa | 03-Apr-2006 | 02-Apr-2012 | 5 years, 365 days | Karnataka | |
| Prabhakar Kore | 26-Jun-2014 | 25-Jun-2020 | 11 years, 365 days | Karnataka | |
| Prabhakar Kore | 26-Jun-2008 | 25-Jun-2014 | 11 years, 365 days | Karnataka | |
| Rama Jois | 26-Jun-2008 | 25-Jun-2014 | 5 years, 364 days | Karnataka | |
| Ayanur Manjunath | 01-Jul-2010 | 30-Jun-2016 | 5 years, 365 days | Karnataka | |
| Hema Malini | 04-Mar-2011 | 03-Apr-2012 | 1 year, 30 days | Karnataka | Elected in By-election |
| Hema Malini | 27-Aug-2003 | 26-Aug-2009 | 5 years, 364 days | Nominated | |
| Basavaraj Patil Sedam | 03-Apr-2012 | 02-Apr-2018 | 5 years, 364 days | Karnataka | |
| R. Ramakrishna | 03-Apr-2012 | 02-Apr-2018 | 5 years, 364 days | Karnataka | |
| Rajeev Chandrasekhar | 03-Apr-2018 | 02-Apr-2024 | 5 years, 365 days | Karnataka | |
| K. C. Ramamurthy | 05-Dec-2019 | 30-Jun-2022 | 2 years, 207 days | Karnataka | Elected in By-election |
| Ashok Gasti | 26-Jun-2020 | 17-Sep-2020 | 83 days | Karnataka | Died in office |
| Iranna B. Kadadi | 26-Jun-2020 | 25-Jun-2026 | 5 years, 364 days | Karnataka | |
| K. Narayan | 24-Nov-2020 | 25-Jun-2026 | 5 years, 213 days | Karnataka | Elected in By-election |
| Vijaya Raje Scindia | 10-Apr-1984 | 27-Nov-1989 | 9 years, 235 days | Madhya Pradesh | Elected to Lok Sabha |
| Vijaya Raje Scindia | 06-Apr-1980 | 09-Apr-1984 | 9 years, 235 days | Madhya Pradesh | Merged From JP |
| Pyarelal Khandelwal | 30-Jun-2004 | 06-Oct-2009 | 5 years, 98 days | Madhya Pradesh | Died in office |
| Pyarelal Khandelwal | 30-Jun-1980 | 29-Jun-1986 | 5 years, 364 days | Madhya Pradesh | |
| Jinendra Kumar Jain | 23-Mar-1990 | 02-Apr-1994 | 4 years, 10 days | Madhya Pradesh | Elected in By-election |
| Jinendra Kumar Jain | 30-Jun-1980 | 29-Jun-1986 | 5 years, 364 days | Madhya Pradesh | |
| L. K. Advani | 03-Apr-1988 | 30-Nov-1989 | 9 years, 241 days | Madhya Pradesh | Elected to Lok Sabha |
| L. K. Advani | 03-Apr-1982 | 02-Apr-1988 | 9 years, 241 days | Madhya Pradesh | |
| L. K. Advani | 06-Apr-1980 | 02-Apr-1982 | 9 years, 241 days | Gujarat | Merged From JP |
| Atal Bihari Vajpayee | 30-Jun-1986 | 17-Jun-1991 | 4 years, 352 days | Madhya Pradesh | Elected to Lok Sabha |
| Shivprasad Chanpuria | 10-Apr-1990 | 09-Apr-1996 | 5 years, 365 days | Madhya Pradesh | |
| Kailash Sarang | 10-Apr-1990 | 09-Apr-1996 | 5 years, 365 days | Madhya Pradesh | |
| Sikander Bakht | 10-Apr-1996 | 09-Apr-2002 | 11 years, 364 days | Madhya Pradesh | |
| Sikander Bakht | 10-Apr-1990 | 09-Apr-1996 | 11 years, 364 days | Madhya Pradesh | |
| Raghavji | 03-Apr-1994 | 02-Apr-2000 | 5 years, 365 days | Madhya Pradesh | |
| Raghavji | 12-Aug-1991 | 29-Jun-1992 | 322 days | Madhya Pradesh | Elected in By-election |
| Narain Prasad Gupta | 30-Jun-1992 | 29-Jun-1998 | 5 years, 364 days | Madhya Pradesh | |
| O. Rajagopal | 30-Jun-1998 | 29-Jun-2004 | 11 years, 365 days | Madhya Pradesh | |
| O. Rajagopal | 30-Jun-1992 | 29-Jun-1998 | 11 years, 365 days | Madhya Pradesh | |
| Jagannath Singh | 30-Jun-1992 | 29-Jun-1998 | 5 years, 364 days | Madhya Pradesh | |
| Govindram Miri | 03-Apr-1994 | 02-Apr-2000 | 5 years, 365 days | Madhya Pradesh | |
| Kailash Chandra Joshi | 03-Apr-2000 | 13-May-2004 | 4 years, 40 days | Madhya Pradesh | Elected to Lok Sabha |
| Vikram Verma | 03-Apr-2006 | 02-Apr-2012 | 11 years, 365 days | Madhya Pradesh | |
| Vikram Verma | 03-Apr-2000 | 02-Apr-2006 | 11 years, 365 days | Madhya Pradesh | |
| Maya Singh | 10-Apr-2008 | 08-Dec-2013 | 11 years, 212 days | Madhya Pradesh | Resigned after getting elected as MLA |
| Maya Singh | 10-Apr-2002 | 09-Apr-2008 | 11 years, 212 days | Madhya Pradesh | |
| Narayan Singh Kesari | 03-Apr-2006 | 02-Apr-2012 | 1 year, 282 days | Madhya Pradesh | |
| Narayan Singh Kesari | 24-Jun-2004 | 02-Apr-2006 | 1 year, 282 days | Madhya Pradesh | Elected in By-election |
| Laxminarayan Sharma | 30-Jun-2004 | 17-Oct-2008 | 4 years, 109 days | Madhya Pradesh | Died in office |
| Su. Thirunavukkarasar | 30-Jun-2004 | 05-Jul-2009 | 5 years, 5 days | Madhya Pradesh | Resigned |
| Anusuiya Uikey | 03-Apr-2006 | 02-Apr-2012 | 5 years, 365 days | Madhya Pradesh | |
| Sushma Swaraj | 03-Apr-2006 | 16-May-2009 | 9 years, 43 days | Madhya Pradesh | Elected to Lok Sabha |
| Sushma Swaraj | 03-Apr-2000 | 02-Apr-2006 | 9 years, 43 days | Uttarakhand | Elected as the Rajya Sabha member from Uttar Pradesh. Continued the term as the Rajya Sabha member from Uttarakhand onwards 9 November 2000. |
| Sushma Swaraj | 10-Apr-1990 | 09-Apr-1996 | 5 years, 365 days | Haryana | |
| Prabhat Jha | 10-Apr-2014 | 09-Apr-2020 | 11 years, 365 days | Madhya Pradesh | |
| Prabhat Jha | 10-Apr-2008 | 09-Apr-2014 | 11 years, 365 days | Madhya Pradesh | |
| Raghunandan Sharma | 10-Apr-2008 | 09-Apr-2014 | 5 years, 364 days | Madhya Pradesh | |
| Narendra Singh Tomar | 20-Jan-2009 | 16 May 2009 | 116 days | Madhya Pradesh | Elected in By-election; Elected to Lok Sabha |
| Anil Madhav Dave | 30-Jun-2016 | 18-May-2017 | 7 years, 287 days | Madhya Pradesh | Died in office |
| Anil Madhav Dave | 30-Jun-2010 | 29-Jun-2016 | 7 years, 287 days | Madhya Pradesh | |
| Anil Madhav Dave | 04-Aug-2009 | 29-Jun-2010 | 7 years, 287 days | Madhya Pradesh | |
| Kaptan Singh Solanki | 03-Apr-2012 | 27-Jul-2014 | 4 years, 357 days | Madhya Pradesh | Resigned after Appointed as Governor Of Haryana |
| Kaptan Singh Solanki | 04-Aug-2009 | 02-Apr-2012 | 4 years, 357 days | Madhya Pradesh | Elected in By-election |
| Chandan Mitra | 30-Jun-2010 | 29-Jun-2016 | 5 years, 365 days | Madhya Pradesh | |
| Chandan Mitra | 27-Aug-2003 | 26-Aug-2003 | 5 years, 364 days | Nominated | |
| Meghraj Jain | 15-Sep-2014 | 02-Apr-2018 | 3 years, 199 days | Madhya Pradesh | Elected in By-election |
| Meghraj Jain | 06-May-2011 | 02-Apr-2012 | 332 days | Madhya Pradesh | Elected in By-election |
| Najma Heptulla | 03-Apr-2012 | 17-Aug-2016 | 4 years, 136 days | Madhya Pradesh | Resigned after Appointed as Governor Of Manipur |
| Najma Heptulla | 05-Jul-2004 | 04-Jul-2010 | 5 years, 364 days | Rajasthan | |
| Faggan Singh Kulaste | 03-Apr-2012 | 16-May-2014 | 2 years, 43 days | Madhya Pradesh | Elected to Lok Sabha |
| Thawar Chand Gehlot | 03-Apr-2018 | 07-Jul-2021 | 9 years, 95 days | Madhya Pradesh | Resigned after Appointed as Governor Of Karnataka |
| Thawar Chand Gehlot | 03-Apr-2012 | 02-Apr-2018 | 9 years, 95 days | Madhya Pradesh | |
| Satyanarayan Jatiya | 10-Apr-2014 | 09-Apr-2020 | 5 years, 365 days | Madhya Pradesh | |
| La. Ganesan | 07-Oct-2016 | 02-Apr-2018 | 1 year, 177 days | Madhya Pradesh | Elected in By-election |
| M. J. Akbar | 30-Jun-2016 | 29-Jun-2022 | 6 years, 361 days | Madhya Pradesh | |
| M. J. Akbar | 03-Jul-2015 | 29-Jun-2016 | 6 years, 361 days | Madhya Pradesh | Elected in By-election |
| Sampatiya Uikey | 01-Aug-2017 | 29-Jun-2022 | 4 years, 332 days | Madhya Pradesh | Elected in By-election |
| Kailash Soni | 03-Apr-2018 | 02-Apr-2024 | 5 years, 365 days | Madhya Pradesh | |
| Ajay Pratap Singh | 03-Apr-2018 | 02-Apr-2024 | 5 years, 365 days | Madhya Pradesh | |
| Dharmendra Pradhan | 03-Apr-2018 | 02-Apr-2024 | 11 years, 365 days | Madhya Pradesh | |
| Dharmendra Pradhan | 03-Apr-2012 | 02-Apr-2018 | 11 years, 365 days | Bihar | |
| Jyotiraditya Scindia | 22-Jun-2020 | 04-Jun-2024 | 3 years, 348 days | Madhya Pradesh | Elected to Lok Sabha |
| Sumer Singh Solanki | 22-Jun-2020 | 21-Jun-2026 | 5 years, 364 days | Madhya Pradesh | |
| George Kurian | 28-Aug-2024 | 21-Jun-2024 | 1 year, 297 days | Madhya Pradesh | Elected In By-election |
| Pramod Mahajan | 05-Jul-2004 | 03-May-2006 | 7 years, 301 days | Maharashtra | Died in office |
| Pramod Mahajan | 05-Jul-1998 | 04-Jul-2004 | 7 years, 301 days | Maharashtra | |
| Pramod Mahajan | 05-Jul-1992 | 10-May-1996 | 9 years, 310 days | Maharashtra | Elected to Lok Sabha |
| Pramod Mahajan | 05-Jul-1986 | 04-Jul-1992 | 9 years, 310 days | Maharashtra | |
| Viren J. Shah | 03-Apr-1990 | 02-Apr-1996 | 5 years, 365 days | Maharashtra | |
| Gopalrao Patil | 03-Apr-1994 | 02-Apr-2000 | 5 years, 365 days | Maharashtra | |
| Suryabhan Vahadane-Patil | 03-Apr-1996 | 02-Apr-2002 | 5 years, 364 days | Maharashtra | |
| Ram Kapse | 27-Sep-1996 | 04-Jul-1998 | 1 year, 280 days | Maharashtra | Elected in By-election |
| Ved Prakash Goyal | 03-Apr-2002 | 02-Apr-2008 | 11 years, 365 days | Maharashtra | |
| Ved Prakash Goyal | 03-Apr-1996 | 02-Apr-2002 | 11 years, 365 days | Maharashtra | |
| Balavant Apte | 03-Apr-2006 | 02-Apr-2012 | 11 years, 365 days | Maharashtra | |
| Balavant Apte | 03-Apr-2000 | 02-Apr-2006 | 11 years, 365 days | Maharashtra | |
| Prakash Javadekar | 03-Apr-2018 | 02-Apr-2024 | 9 years, 294 days | Maharashtra | |
| Prakash Javadekar | 13-Jun-2014 | 02-Apr-2018 | 9 years, 294 days | Madhya Pradesh | |
| Prakash Javadekar | 03-Apr-2008 | 02-Apr-2014 | 5 years, 364 days | Maharashtra | |
| Piyush Goyal | 05-Jul-2022 | 04-Jun-2024 | 13 years, 336 days | Maharashtra | Elected to Lok Sabha |
| Piyush Goyal | 05-Jul-2016 | 04-Jul-2022 | 13 years, 336 days | Maharashtra | |
| Piyush Goyal | 05-Jul-2010 | 04-Jul-2016 | 13 years, 336 days | Maharashtra | |
| Ajay Sancheti | 03-Apr-2012 | 02-Apr-2018 | 5 years, 364 days | Maharashtra | |
| Amar Shankar Sable | 14-Mar-2015 | 02-Apr-2020 | 5 years, 19 days | Maharashtra | Elected in By-election |
| Vikas Mahatme | 05-Jul-2016 | 04-Jul-2022 | 5 years, 364 days | Maharashtra | |
| Vinay Sahasrabuddhe | 05-Jul-2016 | 04-Jul-2022 | 5 years, 364 days | Maharashtra | |
| Narayan Rane | 03-Apr-2018 | 02-Apr-2024 | 5 years, 365 days | Maharashtra | |
| V. Muraleedharan | 03-Apr-2018 | 02-Apr-2024 | 5 years, 365 days | Maharashtra | |
| Udayanraje Bhosale | 03-Apr-2020 | 04-Jun-2024 | 4 years, 62 days | Maharashtra | Elected to Lok Sabha |
| Bhagwat Karad | 03-Apr-2020 | 02-Apr-2026 | 6 years, 62 days | Maharashtra | |
| Dhairyashil Patil | 28-Aug-2024 | 02-Apr-2026 | 1 year, 280 days | Maharashtra | Elected in By-election |
| Bhabananda Singh | 25-May-2017 | 09-Apr-2020 | 2 years, 320 days | Manipur | Elected in By-election |
| Leishemba Sanajaoba | 22-Jun-2020 | 21-Jun-2026 | 5 years, 364 days | Manipur | |
| Surendra Lath | 03-Apr-2002 | 02-Apr-2008 | 5 years, 365 days | Odisha | |
| Chhatrapal Singh Lodha | 02-July-2004 | 18-Dec-2005 | 1 year, 169 days | Odisha | Disqualified |
| Rudra Narayan Pany | 04-Apr-2006 | 03-Apr-2012 | 7 years, 284 days | Odisha | |
| Rudra Narayan Pany | 24-Jun-2004 | 03-Apr-2006 | 7 years, 284 days | Odisha | Elected in By-election |
| Bhagirathi Majhi | 24-Mar-2006 | 01-Jul-2010 | 4 years, 10 days | Odisha | Elected in By-election |
| Balbir Punj | 03-Apr-2008 | 02-Apr-2014 | 5 years, 364 days | Odisha | |
| Balbir Punj | 03-Apr-2000 | 02-Apr-2006 | 5 years, 364 days | Uttar Pradesh | |
| Mamata Mohanta | 28-Aug-2024 | 02-Apr-2026 | 1 year, 217 days | Odisha | Elected in By-election |
| Lajpat Rai | 10-Apr-1998 | 09-Apr-2004 | 5 years, 365 days | Punjab | |
| Gurcharan Kaur | 07-Jun-2001 | 04-Jul-2004 | 3 years, 27 days | Punjab | Elected in By-election |
| Avinash Rai Khanna | 10-Apr-2010 | 09-Apr-2016 | 5 years, 365 days | Punjab | |
| Shwait Malik | 10-Apr-2016 | 09-Apr-2022 | 5 years, 364 days | Punjab | |
| Hari Shankar Bhabhra | 06-Apr-1980 | 09-Apr-1984 | 4 years, 3 days | Rajasthan | Merged From JP |
| Jaswant Singh | 05-Jul-2004 | 16-May-2009 | 10 years, 315 days | Rajasthan | Elected to Lok Sabha |
| Jaswant Singh | 05-Jul-1998 | 04-Jul-2004 | 10 years, 315 days | Rajasthan | |
| Jaswant Singh | 05-Jul-1986 | 27-Nov-1989 | 9 years, 145 days | Rajasthan | Elected to Lok Sabha |
| Jaswant Singh | 05-Jul-1980 | 04-Jul-1986 | 9 years, 145 days | Rajasthan | |
| Gaj Singh | 26-Mar-1990 | 04-Jul-1992 | 2 years, 100 days | Rajasthan | Elected in By-election |
| Ramdas Agarwal | 04-Apr-2006 | 03-Apr-2012 | 5 years, 365 days | Rajasthan | |
| Ramdas Agarwal | 10-Apr-1996 | 09-Apr-2002 | 11 years, 364 days | Rajasthan | |
| Ramdas Agarwal | 10-Apr-1990 | 09-Apr-1996 | 11 years, 364 days | Rajasthan | |
| Sunder Singh Bhandari | 05-Jul-1992 | 26-Apr-1998 | 5 years, 295 days | Rajasthan | Resigned after Appointed as Governor Of Karnataka |
| Sunder Singh Bhandari | 06-Apr-1980 | 02-Apr-1982 | 1 year, 361 days | Uttar Pradesh | Merged From JP |
| Shiv Charan Singh | 05-Jul-1992 | 04-Jul-1998 | 5 years, 295 days | Rajasthan | |
| Satish Chandra Agarwal | 03-Apr-1994 | 10-Sep-1997 | 3 years, 160 days | Rajasthan | Died in office |
| Kanak Mal Katara | 03-Apr-1994 | 02-Apr-2000 | 5 years, 365 days | Rajasthan | |
| Mahesh Chandra Sharma | 10-Apr-1996 | 09-Apr-2002 | 5 years, 364 days | Rajasthan | |
| Onkar Singh Lakhawat | 16-Oct-1997 | 02-Apr-2000 | 2 years, 169 days | Rajasthan | Elected in By-election |
| Laxmi Mall Singhvi | 05-Jul-1998 | 04-Jul-2004 | 5 years, 365 days | Rajasthan | |
| Gyan Prakash Pilania | 10-Apr-2008 | 09-Apr-2014 | 9 years, 284 days | Rajasthan | |
| Gyan Prakash Pilania | 29-Jun-2004 | 09-Apr-2008 | 9 years, 284 days | Rajasthan | Elected in By-election |
| Lalit Kishore Chaturvedi | 05-Jul-2004 | 04-Jul-2010 | 5 years, 364 days | Rajasthan | |
| Krishan Lal Balmiki | 04-Apr-2006 | 21-Apr-2010 | 4 years, 17 days | Rajasthan | Died in office |
| Om Prakash Mathur | 05-Jul-2016 | 04-Jul-2022 | 5 years, 364 days | Rajasthan | |
| Om Prakash Mathur | 10-Apr-2008 | 09-Apr-2014 | 5 years, 364 days | Rajasthan | |
| V. P. Singh Badnore | 05-Jul-2010 | 04-Jul-2016 | 5 years, 365 days | Rajasthan | |
| Bhupender Yadav | 04-Apr-2018 | 03-Apr-2024 | 11 years, 365 days | Rajasthan | |
| Bhupender Yadav | 04-Apr-2012 | 03-Apr-2018 | 11 years, 365 days | Rajasthan | |
| Ramnarayan Dudi | 10-Apr-2014 | 09-Apr-2020 | 5 years, 365 days | Rajasthan | |
| Vijay Goel | 10-Apr-2014 | 09-Apr-2020 | 5 years, 365 days | Rajasthan | |
| Narayan Lal Panchariya | 10-Apr-2014 | 09-Apr-2020 | 5 years, 365 days | Rajasthan | |
| Harshvardhan Singh Dungarpur | 05-Jul-2016 | 04-Jul-2022 | 5 years, 364 days | Rajasthan | |
| Ram Kumar Verma | 05-Jul-2016 | 04-Jul-2022 | 5 years, 364 days | Rajasthan | |
| Venkaiah Naidu | 05-Jul-2016 | 10-Aug-2017 | 1 year, 36 days | Rajasthan | Resigned after getting elected as Vice-President |
| Venkaiah Naidu | 01-Jul-2010 | 30-Jun-2016 | 11 years, 365 days | Karnataka | |
| Venkaiah Naidu | 01-Jul-2004 | 30-Jun-2010 | 11 years, 365 days | Karnataka | |
| Venkaiah Naidu | 03-Apr-1998 | 02-Apr-2004 | 5 years, 365 days | Karnataka | |
| Alphons Kannanthanam | 10-Nov-2017 | 04-Jul-2022 | 4 years, 236 days | Rajasthan | Elected in By-election |
| Kirodi Lal Meena | 04-Apr-2018 | 03-Apr-2024 | 5 years, 365 days | Rajasthan | |
| Madan Lal Saini | 04-Apr-2018 | 24-Jun-2019 | 1 year, 81 days | Rajasthan | Died in office |
| Rajendra Gehlot | 22-Jun-2020 | 21-Jun-2026 | 5 years, 364 days | Rajasthan | |
| Ravneet Singh Bittu | 28-Aug-2024 | 21-Jun-2026 | 1 year, 297 days | Rajasthan | Elected In By-election |
| Garikapati Mohan Rao | 20-Jun-2019 | 09-Apr-2020 | 294 days | Telangana | Merged From TDP |
| Manik Saha | 03-Apr-2022 | 04-Jul-2022 | 92 days | Tripura | Resigned after getting elected as MLA |
| Biplab Kumar Deb | 22-Sep-2022 | 04-Jun-2024 | 1 year, 256 days | Tripura | Elected in By-election; Elected to Lok Sabha |
| Lakhan Singh | 06-Apr-1980 | 02-Apr-1984 | 3 years, 362 days | Uttar Pradesh | Merged From JP |
| Jagdish Prasad Mathur | 03-Apr-1990 | 02-Apr-1996 | 5 years, 365 days | Uttar Pradesh | |
| Jagdish Prasad Mathur | 06-Apr-1980 | 02-Apr-1984 | 3 years, 362 days | Uttar Pradesh | Merged From JP |
| Kalraj Mishra | 03-Apr-2006 | 21-Mar-2012 | 10 years, 288 days | Uttar Pradesh | |
| Kalraj Mishra | 07-Jun-2001 | 02-Apr-2006 | 10 years, 288 days | Uttar Pradesh | Elected in By-election |
| Kalraj Mishra | 06-Apr-1980 | 02-Apr-1984 | 3 years, 362 days | Uttar Pradesh | Merged From JP |
| Murli Manohar Joshi | 05-Jul-2004 | 16-May-2009 | 4 years, 315 days | Uttar Pradesh | Elected to Lok Sabha |
| Murli Manohar Joshi | 05-Jul-1992 | 11-May-1996 | 3 years, 311 days | Uttar Pradesh | Elected to Lok Sabha |
| T. N. Chaturvedi | 05-Jul-1998 | 20-Aug-2002 | 10 years, 46 days | Uttar Pradesh | Resigned after Appointed as Governor Of Karnataka |
| T. N. Chaturvedi | 05-Jul-1992 | 04-Jul-1998 | 10 years, 46 days | Uttar Pradesh | |
| Baldev Prakash | 05-Jul-1992 | 17-Nov-1992 | 135 days | Uttar Pradesh | Died in Office |
| Ishwar Chandra Gupta | 05-Jul-1992 | 04-Jul-1998 | 5 years, 364 days | Uttar Pradesh | |
| Ram Ratan Ram | 05-Jul-1992 | 04-Jul-1998 | 5 years, 364 days | Uttar Pradesh | |
| Vishnu Kant Shastri | 05-Jul-1992 | 04-Jul-1998 | 5 years, 364 days | Uttar Pradesh | |
| Naunihal Singh | 05-Jul-1992 | 04-Jul-1998 | 5 years, 364 days | Uttar Pradesh | |
| Rajnath Singh | 26-Nov-2002 | 25-Nov-2008 | 5 years, 365 days | Uttar Pradesh | |
| Rajnath Singh | 03-Apr-2000 | 19-Apr-2001 | 7 years, 16 days | Uttar Pradesh | |
| Rajnath Singh | 03-Apr-1994 | 02-Apr-2000 | 7 years, 16 days | Uttar Pradesh | |
| Malti Sharma | 03-Apr-1994 | 02-Apr-2000 | 5 years, 365 days | Uttar Pradesh | |
| R. B. S. Varma | 03-Apr-2000 | 02-Apr-2006 | 11 years, 364 days | Uttar Pradesh | |
| R. B. S. Varma | 03-Apr-1994 | 02-Apr-2000 | 11 years, 364 days | Uttar Pradesh | |
| Ranbir Singh Latayan | 03-Apr-1994 | 02-Apr-2000 | 5 years, 365 days | Uttar Pradesh | |
| Ram Nath Kovind | 03-Apr-2000 | 02-Apr-2006 | 11 years, 364 days | Uttar Pradesh | |
| Ram Nath Kovind | 03-Apr-1994 | 02-Apr-2000 | 11 years, 364 days | Uttar Pradesh | |
| Chaudhary Chunnilal | 26-Nov-1996 | 03-Dec-2000 | 4 years, 7 days | Uttar Pradesh | Died in office |
| Narendra Mohan | 26-Nov-1996 | 20-Sep-2002 | 5 years, 298 days | Uttar Pradesh | Died in office |
| Devi Prasad Singh | 26-Nov-1996 | 25-Nov-2002 | 5 years, 364 days | Uttar Pradesh | |
| Rajnath Singh Surya | 26-Nov-1996 | 25-Nov-2002 | 5 years, 364 days | Uttar Pradesh | |
| Dinanath Mishra | 05-Jul-1998 | 04-Jul-2004 | 5 years, 365 days | Uttar Pradesh | |
| Arun Shourie | 05-Jul-2004 | 04-Jul-2010 | 11 years, 364 days | Uttar Pradesh | |
| Arun Shourie | 05-Jul-1998 | 04-Jul-2004 | 11 years, 364 days | Uttar Pradesh | |
| B. P. Singhal | 05-Jul-1998 | 04-Jul-2004 | 5 years, 365 days | Uttar Pradesh | |
| Shyam Lal | 16-Feb-2001 | 25-Nov-2002 | 1 year, 282 days | Uttar Pradesh | Elected in By-election |
| Sunil Shastri | 22-May-2002 | 25-Nov-2002 | 187 days | Uttar Pradesh | Elected in By-election |
| Vinay Katiyar | 03-Apr-2012 | 02-Apr-2018 | 11 years, 364 days | Uttar Pradesh | |
| Vinay Katiyar | 03-Apr-2006 | 02-Apr-2012 | 11 years, 364 days | Uttar Pradesh | |
| Kusum Rai | 26-Nov-2008 | 25-Nov-2014 | 5 years, 364 days | Uttar Pradesh | |
| Manohar Parrikar | 26-Nov-2014 | 02-Sep-2017 | 2 years, 280 days | Uttar Pradesh | Resigned after getting elected as MLA |
| Shiv Pratap Shukla | 05-Jul-2016 | 04-Jul-2022 | 6 years, 17 days | Uttar Pradesh | |
| Ashok Bajpai | 03-Apr-2018 | 02-Apr-2024 | 5 years, 365 days | Uttar Pradesh | |
| Vijaypal Singh Tomar | 03-Apr-2018 | 02-Apr-2024 | 5 years, 365 days | Uttar Pradesh | |
| Anil Agrawal | 03-Apr-2018 | 02-Apr-2024 | 5 years, 365 days | Uttar Pradesh | |
| Anil Jain | 03-Apr-2018 | 02-Apr-2024 | 5 years, 365 days | Uttar Pradesh | |
| Harnath Singh Yadav | 03-Apr-2018 | 02-Apr-2024 | 5 years, 365 days | Uttar Pradesh | |
| Sakal Deep Rajbhar | 03-Apr-2018 | 02-Apr-2024 | 5 years, 365 days | Uttar Pradesh | |
| Kanta Kardam | 03-Apr-2018 | 02-Apr-2024 | 5 years, 365 days | Uttar Pradesh | |
| G. V. L. Narasimha Rao | 03-Apr-2018 | 02-Apr-2024 | 5 years, 365 days | Uttar Pradesh | |
| Arun Jaitley | 03-Apr-2018 | 24-Aug-2019 | 19 years, 143 days | Uttar Pradesh | |
| Arun Jaitley | 03-Apr-2012 | 02-Apr-2018 | 19 years, 143 days | Gujarat | |
| Arun Jaitley | 03-Apr-2006 | 02-Apr-2012 | 19 years, 143 days | Gujarat | |
| Arun Jaitley | 03-Apr-2000 | 02-Apr-2006 | 19 years, 143 days | Gujarat | |
| Jai Prakash Nishad | 17-Aug-2020 | 04-Jul-2022 | 1 year, 321 days | Uttar Pradesh | Elected in By-election |
| Syed Zafar Islam | 04-Sep-2020 | 04-Jul-2022 | 1 year, 303 days | Uttar Pradesh | Elected in By-election |
| Hardwar Dubey | 26-Nov-2020 | 26-Jun-2023 | 2 years, 212 days | Uttar Pradesh | Died in office |
| Dinesh Sharma | 08-Sept-2023 | 11-Sept-2026 | 3 years, 3 days | Uttar Pradesh | Elected In By-election; Resigned after appointed as LG Of Andaman and Nicobar Islands |
| Hardeep Singh Puri | 26-Nov-2020 | 25-Nov-2026 | 8 years, 320 days | Uttar Pradesh | |
| Hardeep Singh Puri | 09-Jan-2018 | 25-Nov-2020 | 8 years, 320 days | Uttar Pradesh | Elected In By-election |
| Arun Singh | 26-Nov-2020 | 25-Nov-2026 | 6 years, 355 days | Uttar Pradesh | |
| Arun Singh | 05-Dec-2019 | 25-Nov-2020 | 6 years, 355 days | Uttar Pradesh | Elected In By-election |
| Banwari Lal Verma | 26-Nov-2020 | 25-Nov-2026 | 5 years, 364 days | Uttar Pradesh | |
| Brij Lal | 26-Nov-2020 | 25-Nov-2026 | 5 years, 364 days | Uttar Pradesh | |
| Neeraj Shekhar | 26-Nov-2020 | 25-Nov-2026 | 7 years, 91 days | Uttar Pradesh | |
| Neeraj Shekhar | 26-Aug-2019 | 25-Nov-2020 | 7 years, 91 days | Uttar Pradesh | Elected In By-election |
| Seema Dwivedi | 26-Nov-2020 | 25-Nov-2026 | 5 years, 364 days | Uttar Pradesh | |
| Geeta Shakya | 26-Nov-2020 | 25-Nov-2026 | 5 years, 364 days | Uttar Pradesh | |
| Manohar Kant Dhyani | 26-Nov-1996 | 25-Nov-2002 | 5 years, 364 days | Uttarakhand | Elected as the Rajya Sabha member from Uttar Pradesh. Continued the term as the Rajya Sabha member from Uttarakhand onwards 9 November 2000. |
| Sangh Priya Gautam | 05-Jul-1998 | 04-Jul-2004 | 5 years, 365 days | Uttarakhand | Elected as the Rajya Sabha member from Uttar Pradesh. Continued the term as the Rajya Sabha member from Uttarakhand onwards 9 November 2000. |
| Sangh Priya Gautam | 03-Apr-1990 | 02-Apr-1996 | 5 years, 365 days | Uttar Pradesh | |
| Bhagat Singh Koshyari | 26-Nov-2008 | 16-May-2014 | 5 years, 171 days | Uttarakhand | Elected to Lok Sabha |
| Tarun Vijay | 05-Jul-2010 | 04-Jul-2016 | 5 years, 365 days | Uttarakhand | |
| Anil Baluni | 03-Apr-2018 | 02-Apr-2024 | 5 years, 365 days | Uttarakhand | |
| Naresh Bansal | 26-Nov-2020 | 25-Nov-2026 | 5 years, 364 days | Uttarakhand | |
| Bhai Mahavir | 06-Apr-1980 | 02-Apr-1984 | 3 years, 362 days | Delhi | Merged From JP |
| Jagannathrao Joshi | 06-Apr-1980 | 02-Apr-1984 | 3 years, 362 days | Delhi | Merged From JP |
| Om Prakash Kohli | 28-Jan-1994 | 27-Jan-2000 | 5 years, 364 days | Delhi | |
| Vijay Kumar Malhotra | 28-Jan-1994 | 27-Jan-2000 | 5 years, 364 days | Delhi | |
| K. R. Malkani | 28-Jan-1994 | 27-Jan-2000 | 5 years, 364 days | Delhi | |
| Narayan Singh Manaklao | 27-Aug-2003 | 26-Aug-2009 | 5 years, 364 days | Nominated | |
| Dara Singh | 27-Aug-2003 | 26-Aug-2009 | 5 years, 364 days | Nominated | |
| Navjot Singh Sidhu | 25-Apr-2016 | 18-Jul-2016 | 84 days | Nominated | Resigned |
| Suresh Gopi | 25-Apr-2016 | 24-Apr-2022 | 5 years, 364 days | Nominated | |
| Subramanian Swamy | 25-Apr-2016 | 24-Apr-2022 | 5 years, 364 days | Nominated | |
| Sambhaji Raje | 13-Jun-2016 | 03-May-2022 | 5 years, 324 days | Nominated | |
| Roopa Ganguly | 04-Oct-2016 | 24-Apr-2022 | 5 years, 202 days | Nominated | |
| Raghunath Mohapatra | 14-Jul-2018 | 09-May-2021 | 2 years, 299 days | Nominated | Died in office |
| Sonal Mansingh | 14-Jul-2018 | 13-Jul-2024 | 5 years, 365 days | Nominated | |
| Ram Shakal | 14-Jul-2018 | 13-Jul-2024 | 5 years, 365 days | Nominated | |
| Rakesh Sinha | 14-Jul-2018 | 13-Jul-2024 | 5 years, 365 days | Nominated | |
| Swapan Dasgupta | 02-Jun-2021 | 24-Apr-2022 | 326 days | Nominated | |
| Mahesh Jethmalani | 02-Jun-2021 | 13-Jul-2024 | 3 years, 41 days | Nominated | |

== See also ==
- List of chief ministers from the Bharatiya Janata Party
- List of presidents of the Bharatiya Janata Party
