= List of Rajya Sabha members from Jharkhand =

The list of current and past Rajya Sabha members from the Jharkhand State. State elect six members for the term of six years. They are indirectly elected by the state legislators of Jharkhand state, since 2002 biennial elections to Rajya Sabha. As per the Bihar Reorganisation Act 2000, these six seats are allocated to Jharkhand state from Bihar State, reducing Bihar seats from 22 to 16 seats, since 15 November 2000.

== Current members ==
Keys: BJP (2) JMM (3) Independent (1)

#	Name	Party	Term start	Term end
1	Sarfaraz Ahmad	JMM	04-May-2024	03-May-2030
2	Pradip Kumar Varma	BJP	04-May-2024	03-May-2030
3	Mahua Maji	JMM	08-Jul-2022	07-Jul-2028
4	Aditya Sahu	BJP	08-Jul-2022	07-Jul-2028
5	Baidyanath Ram	JMM	18-Jun-2026	19-Jun-2032
6	Parimal Nathwani	IND	18-Jun-2026	19-Jun-2032

== Chronological list of Rajya Sabha members from Jharkhand state ==
Alphabetical list by last name

The list is incomplete.

- * represents current members

Name	Party	Term start	Term end	Term	Notes
Sarfaraz Ahmad	JMM	04-May-2024	03-May-2030	1	
Pradip Kumar Varma	BJP	04-May-2024	03-May-2030	1	
Mahua Maji	JMM	08-Jul-2022	07-Jul-2028	1	
Aditya Sahu	BJP	08-Jul-2022	07-Jul-2028	1	
Baidyanath Ram	JMM	18-Jun-2026	19-Jun-2032	1	
Parimal Nathwani	IND	18-Jun-2026	19-Jun-2032	3	
Deepak Prakash	BJP	22-Jun-2020	21-Jun-2026	1	
Shibu Soren	JMM	22-Jun-2020	04-Aug-2025	3	Death On 04-Aug-2025
Sameer Oraon	BJP	04-May-2018	03-May-2024	1	
Dhiraj Prasad Sahu	INC	04-May-2018	03-May-2024	3	
Mukhtar Abbas Naqvi	BJP	08-Jul-2016	07-Jul-2022	1	
Mahesh Poddar	BJP	08-Jul-2016	07-Jul-2022	1	
M. J. Akbar	BJP	03-Jul-2015	29-Jun-2016	1	bye- res of K. D. Singh
Prem Chand Gupta	RJD	10-Apr-2014	09-Apr-2020	1	
Parimal Nathwani	IND	10-Apr-2014	09-Apr-2020	2	
Pradeep Kumar Balmuchu	INC	04-May-2012	03-May-2018	1	
Sanjiv Kumar	JMM	04-May-2012	03-May-2018	1	
K. D. Singh	JMM	08-Jul-2010	12-Feb-2014	1	resigned
Dhiraj Prasad Sahu	INC	08-Jul-2010	07-Jul-2016	2	
Dhiraj Prasad Sahu	INC	24-Jun-2009	07-Jul-2010	1	bye - res of Digvijay Singh
Hemant Soren	JMM	24-Jun-2009	04-Jan-2010	1	bye -res of Yashwant Sinha resigned
Parimal Nathwani	IND	10-Apr-2008	09-Apr-2014	1	
Jai Prakash Narayan Singh	BJP	10-Apr-2008	09-Apr-2014	1	
S. S. Ahluwalia	BJP	03-Apr-2006	02-Apr-2012	2	
Mabel Rebello	INC	03-Apr-2006	02-Apr-2012	1	
Digvijay Singh	JDU	06-Jun-2005	05-Apr-2009	1	bye - res of Stephen Marandi resigned
Stephen Marandi	JMM	08-Jul-2004	16-Mar-2005	1	disqualified
Yashwant Sinha	BJP	08-Jul-2004	16-May-2009	1	elected to Hazaribagh Lok Sabha
Devdas Apte	BJP	02-Jul-2002	09-Apr-2008	1	bye - res of Shibu Soren
Ajay Maroo	BJP	10-Apr-2002	09-Apr-2008	1	
Shibu Soren	JMM	10-Apr-2002	02-Jun-2002	2	resigned
S. S. Ahluwalia	BJP	03-Apr-2000	02-Apr-2006	1	
R. K. Anand	INC	03-Apr-2000	02-Apr-2006	1	
Abhay Kant Prasad	BJP	05-Jun-2002	07-Jul-2004	1	bye - death of Dayanand Sahay
Dayanand Sahay	IND	19-Jul-2001	19-Mar-2002	1	bye - res of Shibu Soren expired
Shibu Soren	JMM	08-Jul-1998	18-Jul-2001	1	resigned
Parmeshwar Kumar Agarwalla	BJP	08-Jul-1998	07-Jul-2004	1	
Ven'ble Dhammaviriyo	RJD	15-Nov-2000	09-Apr-2002	1	
Obaidullah Khan Azmi	JD	10-Apr-1996	09-Apr-2002	1	

== Party-wise MPs list ==
=== Bharatiya Janata Party ===
- * represents current members

#	Name	Party	Term start	Term end	Notes
1.	Parmeshwar Kumar Agarwalla	BJP	08-Jul-1998	07-Jul-2004	
2.	Abhay Kant Prasad	BJP	05-Jun-2002	07-Jul-2004	
3.	S. S. Ahluwalia	BJP	03-Apr-2000	02-Apr-2006	1st term
3.	S. S. Ahluwalia	BJP	03-Apr-2006	02-Apr-2012	2nd term
4.	Ajay Maroo	BJP	10-Apr-2002	09-Apr-2008	
5.	Devdas Apte	BJP	02-Jul-2002	09-Apr-2008	
6.	Yashwant Sinha	BJP	08-Jul-2004	16-May-2009	
7.	Jai Prakash Narayan Singh	BJP	10-Apr-2008	09-Apr-2014	
8.	M. J. Akbar	BJP	03-Jul-2015	29-Jun-2016	
9.	Mahesh Poddar	BJP	08-Jul-2016	07-Jul-2022	
10.	Mukhtar Abbas Naqvi	BJP	08-Jul-2016	07-Jul-2022	
11.	Sameer Oraon	BJP	04-May-2018	03-May-2024	
12.	Deepak Prakash	BJP	22-Jun-2020	21-Jun-2026	
13.	Aditya Sahu	BJP	08-Jul-2022	07-Jul-2028	
14.	Pradip Kumar Varma	BJP	04-May-2024	03-May-2030	

=== Jharkhand Mukti Morcha ===
- * represents current members

#	Name	Party	Term start	Term end	Notes
1.	Shibu Soren	JMM	08-Jul-1998	18-Jul-2001	1st term
1.	Shibu Soren	JMM	10-Apr-2002	02-Jun-2002	2nd term
1.	Shibu Soren	JMM	22-Jun-2020	04-Aug-2025	3rd term
2.	Stephen Marandi	JMM	08-Jul-2004	16-Mar-2005	
3.	Hemant Soren	JMM	24-Jun-2009	04-Jan-2010	
4.	Kanwar Deep Singh	JMM	08-Jul-2010	12-Feb-2014	
5.	Sanjiv Kumar	JMM	04-May-2012	03-May-2018	
6.	Mahua Maji	JMM	08-Jul-2022	07-Jul-2028	
7.	Sarfaraz Ahmad	JMM	04-May-2024	03-May-2030	
8.	Baidyanath Ram	JMM	22-Jun-2026	21-Jun-2032	

=== Indian National Congress ===
#	Name	Party	Term start	Term end	Notes
1	Ram Kumar Anand	INC	03-Apr-2000	02-Apr-2006	
2	Mabel Rebello	INC	03-Apr-2006	02-Apr-2012	
3	Dhiraj Prasad Sahu	INC	24-Jun-2009	07-Jul-2010	1st term
3	Dhiraj Prasad Sahu	INC	08-Jul-2010	07-Jul-2016	2nd term
3	Dhiraj Prasad Sahu	INC	04-May-2018	03-May-2024	3rd term
4	Pradeep Kumar Balmuchu	INC	04-May-2012	03-May-2018	

=== Rashtriya Janata Dal ===
#	Name	Party	Term start	Term end	Notes
1	Ven'ble Dhammaviriyo	RJD	15-Nov-2000	09-Apr-2002	
2	Prem Chand Gupta	RJD	10-Apr-2014	09-Apr-2020	

=== Janata Dal (United) ===
#	Name	Party	Term start	Term end	Notes
1	Digvijay Singh	JD(U)	06-Jun-2005	05-Apr-2009	

=== Janata Dal ===
#	Name	Party	Term start	Term end	Notes
1	Obaidullah Khan Azmi	JD	10-Apr-1996	09-Apr-2002	

=== Independent ===
#	Name	Party	Term start	Term end	Notes
1	Dayanand Sahay	IND	19-Jul-2001	19-Mar-2002	
2	Parimal Nathwani	IND	10-Apr-2008	09-Apr-2014	1st term
(2)	Parimal Nathwani	IND	10-Apr-2014	09-Apr-2020	2nd term
