= Bharatiya Janata Party – Jharkhand =

Jharkhand Pradesh affiliate of the Bharatiya Janata Party

- Abbreviation: BJP
- President: Aditya Sahu
- Chairman: Babulal Marandi (Leader of the Opposition)
- General Secretary: Karmveer Singh
- Founder: Atal Bihari Vajpayee; Lal Krishna Advani; Murli Manohar Joshi; Nanaji Deshmukh; K. R. Malkani; Sikandar Bakht; Vijay Kumar Malhotra; Vijaya Raje Scindia; Bhairon Singh Shekhawat; Shanta Kumar; Ram Jethmalani; Jagannathrao Joshi
- Founded: 6 April 1980 (46 years ago)
- Headquarters: Dr. Syama Prasad Mookerji Bhawan M-7, Harmu Housing Colony, Ranchi - 834 002 Jharkhand
- Colours: Saffron
- ECI status: National Party
- Seats in Rajya Sabha: 3 / 6
- Seats in Lok Sabha: 8 / 14
- Seats in Jharkhand Legislative Assembly: 21 / 81

Election symbol
- Lotus

Party flag

Website
- bjpjharkhand.org

Bharatiya Janata Party – Jharkhand, or simply BJP Jharkhand, is the affiliate of Bharatiya Janata Party for the state of Jharkhand. Its head office is situated at the M-7, Harmu Housing Colony, Ranchi. Aditya Sahu was appointed as the State President of the Jharkhand unit on 14 January 2026.

== History ==
At the time of its formation in 1980, the Bharatiya Janata Party had limited success in what would become Jharkhand. In the 1985 Bihar legislative assembly election, the BJP won 16 seats of which 14 were in regions that would become part of Jharkhand. In 1989, the BJP won five seats in the region. The BJP had long supported the creation of a state out of the southern part of Bihar they called 'Vananchal', in keeping with their naming of the Adivasis as 'Vanvasis'. The BJP's rhetoric at this time with regards to the Jharkhand movement largely claimed that the mainstream leaders, which they saw as westernized 'elites', were using the Jharkhand movement to enrich themselves. The BJP sought to persuade non-Christian tribals by claiming they were part of the 'Hindu nation', while demonizing Christian tribals as westernised. Much of this groundwork was prepared by sister organisations like the Vanavasi Kalyan Ashram, which sought to prevent Christian conversions among Adivasis and Hinduize them.

In 1989, due to their promise for Vananchal, they obtained 5 out of the 14 seats in the Lok Sabha, with a 30% vote share. In 1990, the BJP gained 20 seats with a vote share of at least 20% in the Jharkhand region, which stayed with the party throughout the 1990s. In 1991, the BJP officially added a promise to set up a commission to study the division of larger states, including Bihar, into smaller states and gained five seats. The electorate in Jharkhand were favouring national parties who could form a government at the Centre and grant them statehood, and the BJP was the most influential party advocating strongly for statehood. In 1996 and 1998, the BJP obtained 12 seats in the Jharkhand region, and 11 in 1999, squeezing out other regional parties like JMM and AJSU who were also advocating for statehood. The BJP combined its small states agenda with a patronization of tribal institutions and nomination of tribal candidates for the elections. In the 2000 Bihar assembly elections, the BJP gained the most seats in the Jharkhand region, with 39.5% of the vote, and when the BJP at the centre formed the three new states, the BJP formed the first government. Babulal Marandi was chosen as the first Chief Minister.

The BJP was not alone in this government and had to share power with both the Janata Dal (United), Vananchal Congress and AJSU. There was constant infighting in this coalition up to and including blackmail of ministers. This all was compounded by the controversial domicile bill he attempted to pass to restrict eligibility for residency in Jharkhand to those whose ancestors appeared in a 1932 land survey, which caused major controversy among the significant population of more recent migrants to the state. At last a major political crisis erupted in March 2003 when seven ministers from the coalition resigned and a bill was defeated. Marandi was forced to resign, and Arjun Munda was selected to be the next Chief Minister of Jharkhand.

In the 2004 elections, the rival Congress-led UPA won 13 out of 14 seats in Jharkhand. The dissolution of the alliance with the JD(U) and AJSU led them to act as vote spoilers for the BJP in several constituencies, while widespread dissatisfaction over unemployment and unpopularity of certain candidates among locals and party workers alike led to lacklustre support. In addition the BJP lost support among Adivasis and other OBCs, remaining strong only in its core upper caste vote base. In 2005 however, the BJP was able to make a comeback by winning 30 out of 81 seats, while its coalition partners won 6 seats. After Shibu Soren tried and failed to form a government, Arjun Munda became Chief Minister again with a very unstable majority.

However the government was only supported by a set of independents, so in 2006 Arjun Munda was forced to resign and was replaced by Madhu Koda, who was supported by the UPA. In the 2009 Lok Sabha elections, the party performed well, winning 8 out of 14 seats. In the subsequent assembly elections, the party won 18 seats and formed a coalition government with Shibu Soren as Chief Minister. However when Soren lost a byelection to be eligible to be Chief Minister and due to his alienation of the BJP, the party withdrew support from his coalition in May 2010 and forced the imposition of President's Rule for several months. In September 2010, Arjun Munda was invited to be Chief Minister again as the head of a BJP-JMM coalition with Shibu Soren as deputy CM. After three years, the JMM withdrew support for his government in January 2013.

In 2014, Jharkhand was caught up in the 'Modi wave' like the rest of the country, and the BJP won 12 out of 14 Lok Sabha seats from Jharkhand. In the assembly elections also, the BJP performed very well and secured 37 seats. The BJP gave the seat to Raghubar Das, an OBC non-tribal from Chhattisgarh who had his base in Jamshedpur. However his decisions to amend the domicile policy to grant residency status to anyone who had lived in the state for 30 years and his plans for changing land tenancy to allow non-agricultural use of tribal land alienated Adivasi voters. The BJP ended up losing six out of seven byelections held before the 2019 Lok Sabha polls. In 2019 however, the BJP again dominated the Lok Sabha elections winning 11 out of 14 seats. The BJP campaign focused on nationalism, putting emphasis on the Balakot strikes as a response to the Pulwama attack allowing them to capture votes of OBCs and tribals in addition to their upper caste votebank. However in the subsequent assembly elections, anti-incumbency against Raghubar Das' government led to a defeat of the BJP where they won only 25 seats with Das himself losing his seat. The BJP thus became the opposition party and attempted to bring the demise of Chief Minister Hemant Soren's government by bringing votes of no confidence, most notably on 5 September 2022. The party's nomination of Draupadi Murmu as president was partially to appeal to the tribal votebank in states like Jharkhand.

In 2024, the BJP won fewer Lok Sabha seats in Jharkhand (8 out of 14) and suffered votebank erosion especially in tribal-majority areas. The INDIA opposition especially talked about the arrest of Hemant Soren in a criminal case as an example of BJP 'prejudice' towards tribals and significantly eroded BJP support among tribals. After the release of Hemant Soren and his retaking of the CM chair, the former CM Champai Soren joined the BJP. In the leadup to the 2024 assembly elections, the BJP emphasized alleged "infiltration" of Muslims from Bangladesh to the state, especially in Santhal Parganas, to win support from local voters concerned about 'outsiders' and to split the tribal-Muslim coalition which supported the INDIA alliance. However in the elections, the BJP won only 21 seats, and continues to be in opposition to the current INDIA government. The election cemented the alienation of the BJP from their former tribal votebank.

== Electoral history ==
=== Lok Sabha election ===
Year	Seats won	+/-	Outcome
2004	1 / 14	Steady	Opposition
2009	9 / 14	▲8	Opposition
2014	12 / 14	▲3	Government
2019	11 / 14	▼1	Government
2024	8 / 14	▼3	Government

=== Legislative Assembly election ===
Year	Seats won	+/-	Voteshare (%)	+/- (%)	Outcome
2005	30 / 81	▲30	23.57%	▲23.57	Government, later Opposition
2009	18 / 81	▼12	20.18%	▼3.39%	Government, later Opposition
2014	37 / 81	▲19	31.26%	▲11.08%	Government
2019	25 / 81	▼12	33.37%	▲2.11%	Opposition
2024	21 / 81	▼4	33.18%	▼0.19%	Opposition

== List of chief ministers ==
#	Portrait	Name	Constituency	Term			Assembly
1		Babulal Marandi	Ramgarh	15 November 2000	18 March 2003	2 years, 123 days	1st
2		Arjun Munda	Kharsawan	18 March 2003	2 March 2005	1 year, 349 days	1st
2		Arjun Munda	Kharsawan	12 March 2005	19 September 2006	1 year, 191 days	2nd
2		Arjun Munda	Kharsawan	11 September 2010	18 January 2013	2 years, 129 days	3rd
3		Raghubar Das	Jamshedpur East	28 December 2014	29 December 2019	5 years, 1 day	4th

== List of deputy chief ministers ==
#	Portrait	Name	Constituency	Term			Assembly	Chief Minister
1		Raghubar Das	Jamshedpur East	30 December 2009	31 May 2010	152 days	3rd	Shibu Soren

== List of leaders of the opposition ==
#	Portrait	Name	Constituency	Term			Assembly
1		Arjun Munda	Kharsawan	4 December 2006	29 May 2009	2 years, 176 days	2nd
1		Arjun Munda	Kharsawan	19 July 2013	23 December 2014	1 year, 157 days	3rd
2		Babulal Marandi	Dhanwar	24 February 2020	16 October 2023	3 years, 234 days	5th
3		Amar Kumar Bauri	Chandankiyari	16 October 2023	23 November 2024	1 year, 38 days	5th
(2)		Babulal Marandi	Dhanwar	6 March 2025	Incumbent	1 year, 253 days	6th

== List of presidents ==
#	Name	Term in Office		
1	Prof. Dukha Bhagat	1998	Sep 2001	3 years
2	Abhay Kant Prasad	2 September 2001	18 July 2004	2 years, 320 days
3	Raghubar Das	18 July 2004	13 May 2005	299 days
4	Yadunath Pandey	13 May 2005	Oct 2007	2 years
5	Pashupati Nath Singh	Oct 2007	Jan 2009	1 year
6	Raghubar Das	Jan 2009	25 September 2010	1 year
7	Dineshanand Goswami	25 September 2010	10 March 2013	2 years, 166 days
8	Ravindra Kumar Ray	10 March 2013	17 May 2016	3 years, 68 days
9	Tala Marandi	17 May 2016	24 August 2016	99 days
10	Laxman Giluwa	24 August 2016	25 February 2020	3 years, 185 days
11	Deepak Prakash	25 February 2020	4 July 2023	3 years, 129 days
12	Babulal Marandi	4 July 2023	14 January 2026	2 years, 194 days
13	Aditya Sahu	14 January 2026	Incumbent	304 days

== List of MPs ==
=== Members of Parliament, Rajya Sabha ===
S.No	Members of Parliament	Term	
S.No	Members of Parliament	Term Start	Term End
1.	Parmeshwar Kumar Agarwalla	8 July 1998	7 July 2004
2.	Surendrajeet Singh Ahluwalia	3 April 2000	2 April 2006
2.	Surendrajeet Singh Ahluwalia	3 April 2006	2 April 2012
3.	Ajay Maroo	10 April 2002	9 April 2008
4.	Abhay Kant Prasad	5 June 2002	7 July 2004
5.	Devdas Apte	2 July 2002	9 April 2008
6.	Yashwant Sinha	8 July 2004	16 May 2009
7.	Jai Prakash Narayan Singh	10 April 2008	9 April 2014
8.	Mobasher Jawed Akbar	3 July 2015	29 June 2016
9.	Mahesh Poddar	8 July 2016	7 July 2022
10.	Mukhtar Abbas Naqvi	8 July 2016	7 July 2022
11.	Sameer Oraon	4 May 2018	3 May 2024
12.	Deepak Prakash	22 June 2020	21 June 2026
13.	Aditya Sahu	8 July 2022	7 July 2028
14.	Pradip Kumar Varma	4 May 2024	3 May 2030

=== Members of Parliament, Lok Sabha ===
S.No	MPs	Constituency	Term
1.	Babulal Marandi	Kodarma	2004-2006
2.	Devidhan Besra	Rajmahal (ST)	2009-2014
3.	Nishikant Dubey	Godda	2009-2014
3.	Nishikant Dubey	Godda	2014-2019
3.	Nishikant Dubey	Godda	2019-2024
3.	Nishikant Dubey	Godda	2024-2029
4.	Ravindra Kumar Pandey	Giridih	2009-2014
4.	Ravindra Kumar Pandey	Giridih	2014-2019
5.	Pashupati Nath Singh	Dhanbad	2009-2014
5.	Pashupati Nath Singh	Dhanbad	2014-2019
5.	Pashupati Nath Singh	Dhanbad	2019-2024
6.	Arjun Munda	Jamshedpur	2009-2011
6.	Arjun Munda	Khunti (ST)	2019-2024
7.	Kariya Munda	Khunti (ST)	2009-2014
7.	Kariya Munda	Khunti (ST)	2014-2019
8.	Sudarshan Bhagat	Lohardaga (ST)	2009-2014
8.	Sudarshan Bhagat	Lohardaga (ST)	2014-2019
8.	Sudarshan Bhagat	Lohardaga (ST)	2019-2024
9.	Yashwant Sinha	Hazaribagh	2009-2014
10.	Sunil Kumar Singh	Chatra	2014-2019
10.	Sunil Kumar Singh	Chatra	2019-2024
11.	Ravindra Kumar Ray	Kodarma	2014-2019
12.	Ram Tahal Choudhary	Ranchi	2014-2019
13.	Bidyut Baran Mahato	Jamshedpur	2014-2019
13.	Bidyut Baran Mahato	Jamshedpur	2019-2024
13.	Bidyut Baran Mahato	Jamshedpur	2024-2029
15.	Laxman Giluwa	Singhbhum (ST)	2014-2019
16.	Vishnu Dayal Ram	Palamu (SC)	2014-2019
16.	Vishnu Dayal Ram	Palamu (SC)	2019-2024
16.	Vishnu Dayal Ram	Palamu (SC)	2024-2029
17.	Jayant Sinha	Hazaribagh	2014-2019
17.	Jayant Sinha	Hazaribagh	2019-2024
18.	Sunil Soren	Dumka	2019-2024
19.	Annpurna Devi	Kodarma	2019-2024
19.	Annpurna Devi	Kodarma	2024-2029
20.	Sanjay Seth	Ranchi	2019-2024
20.	Sanjay Seth	Ranchi	2024-2029
21.	Kalicharan Singh	Chatra	2024-2029
22.	Dulu Mahato	Dhanbad	2024-2029
23.	Manish Jaiswal	Hazaribagh	2024-2029

== See also ==
- Bharatiya Janata Party – Gujarat
- Bharatiya Janata Party – Uttar Pradesh
- Bharatiya Janata Party – Madhya Pradesh
- State units of the Bharatiya Janata Party
