= List of parliamentary constituencies in Jharkhand =

== Lok Sabha ==
The Lok Sabha (meaning "House of the People") is the lower house of the Parliament of India, elected by the state electorates of Jharkhand.

=== Current constituencies ===
Keys: BJP (8) INC (2) JMM (3) AJSU (1)
Source: Parliament of India (Lok Sabha)

No.	Name	Reserved for (SC/ST/None)	Assembly constituency segment	Current member	Party
1	Rajmahal	ST	1. Rajmahal; 2. Borio; 3. Barhait; 4. Litipara; 5. Pakaur; 6. Maheshpur	Vijay Hansda	Jharkhand Mukti Morcha
2	Dumka	ST	7. Sikaripara; 8. Nala; 9. Jamtara; 10. Dumka; 11. Jama; 14. Sarath	Nalin Soren	Jharkhand Mukti Morcha
3	Godda	None	12. Jarmundi; 13. Madhupur; 15. Deoghar; 16. Poreyahat; 17. Godda; 18. Mahagama	Nishikant Dubey	Bharatiya Janata Party
4	Chatra	None	26. Simaria; 27. Chatra; 73. Manika; 74. Latehar; 75. Panki	Kali Charan Singh	Bharatiya Janata Party
5	Kodarma	None	19. Kodarma; 20. Barkatha; 28. Dhanwar; 29. Bagodar; 30. Jamua; 31. Gandey	Annapurna Devi Yadav	Bharatiya Janata Party
6	Giridih	None	32. Giridih; 33. Dumri; 34. Gomia; 35. Bermo; 42. Tundi; 43. Baghmara	Chandra Prakash Choudhary	All Jharkhand Students Union
7	Dhanbad	None	32. Bokaro; 37. Chandankiyari; 38. Sindri; 39. Nirsa; 40. Dhanbad; 41. Jharia	Dulu Mahato	Bharatiya Janata Party
8	Ranchi	None	50. Ichagarh; 61. Silli; 62. Khijri; 63. Ranchi; 64. Hatia; 65. Kanke	Sanjay Seth	Bharatiya Janata Party
9	Jamshedpur	None	44. Baharagora; 45. Ghatsila; 46. Potka; 47. Jugsalai; 48. Jamshedpur East; 49. Jamshedpur West	Bidyut Baran Mahato	Bharatiya Janata Party
10	Singhbhum	ST	51. Seraikella; 52. Chaibasa; 53. Majhgaon; 54. Jaganathpur; 55. Manoharpur; 56. Chakradharpur	Joba Majhi	Jharkhand Mukti Morcha
11	Khunti	ST	57. Kharsawan; 58. Tamar; 59. Torpa; 60. Khunti; 70. Simdega; 71. Kolebira	Kali Charan Munda	Indian National Congress
12	Lohardaga	ST	66. Mandar; 67. Sisai; 68. Gumla; 69. Bishunpur; 72. Lohardaga	Sukhdeo Bhagat	Indian National Congress
13	Palamu	SC	76. Daltonganj; 77. Bishrampur; 78. Chhatarpur; 79. Hussainabad; 80. Garhwa; 81. Bhawanathpur	Vishnu Dayal Ram	Bharatiya Janata Party
14	Hazaribagh	None	21. Barhi; 22. Barkagaon; 23. Ramgarh; 24. Mandu; 25. Hazaribagh	Manish Jaiswal	Bharatiya Janata Party

== Rajya Sabha ==
The Rajya Sabha (meaning the "Council of States") is the upper house of the Parliament of India. Jharkhand state elects six members and they are indirectly elected by the state legislators of Jharkhand. The number of seats allocated to the party, are determined by the number of seats a party possesses during nomination and the party nominates a member to be voted on. Elections within the state legislatures are held using Single transferable vote with proportional representation.

=== Current members ===
Keys: BJP (3) JMM (2) Vacant (1)

No.	Name	Party	Term (DD/MM/YYYY)
1	Deepak Prakash	Bharatiya Janata Party	22/06/2020 - 21/06/2026
2	Vacant	Vacant	08/2025 - 21/06/2026
3	Mahua Maji	Jharkhand Mukti Morcha	08/07/2022 – 07/07/2028
4	Aditya Sahu	Bharatiya Janata Party	08/07/2022 – 07/07/2028
5	Sarfaraz Ahmad	Jharkhand Mukti Morcha	04/05/2024 – 03/05/2030
6	Pradip Kumar Varma	Bharatiya Janata Party	04/05/2024 – 03/05/2030

== See also ==
- List of constituencies of the Jharkhand Legislative Assembly
