= Parimal Nathwani =

Indian Businessman and Politician

Parimal Dhirajlal Nathwani
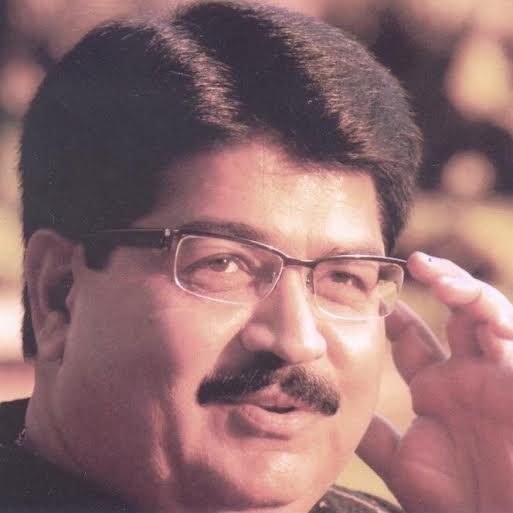

Member of Parliament, Rajya Sabha
- Incumbent
- Assumed office 22 June 2026
- Preceded by: Deepak Prakash
- Constituency: Jharkhand
- In office 22 June 2020 – 21 June 2026
- Preceded by: K. Keshava Rao
- Succeeded by: Lingamaneni Ramesh
- Constituency: Andhra Pradesh
- In office 10 April 2008 – 9 April 2020
- Preceded by: Devdas Apte
- Succeeded by: Deepak Prakash
- Constituency: Jharkhand

Personal details
- Born: 1 February 1956 (age 70) Bombay, Bombay State, India
- Party: Independent (since 2026)
- Spouse: Varsha Nathwani
- Children: Dhanraj Nathwani (son); Karan Nathwani (son)
- Parent(s): Dhirajlal Nathwani (Father); Pushpaben Nathwani(Mother)
- Occupation: Trader and Industrialist
- Website: www.parimalnathwani.com

Parimal Dhirajlal Nathwani (born 1 February 1956) is an Indian politician and industrialist. He represents Member of Parliament, Rajya Sabha from Jharkhand since the 2026 Rajya Sabha elections, previously serving as a Rajya Sabha MP for Jharkhand from 2008-2020 and from Andhra Pradesh for 2020-2026 term.

Mr. Nathwani is the Director of Corporate Affairs at Reliance Industries Limited. He worked closely with Shri Dhirubhai Ambani and Mukesh Ambani and was involved in land acquisition for the world's largest oil refinery in Jamnagar, Gujarat.

Nathwani has spearheaded several schemes of Reliance Industries Limited, like land acquisition, and setting up their retail platforms as well as the roll-out of Reliance Jio in Gujarat. As a Member of Parliament from Jharkhand, he worked towards the refinement of the villages he adopted under the PMSAGY scheme.

== Early life ==
Born on 1 February 1956 to Pushpaben Nathwani and Dhirajlal Nathwani in Mumbai, Parimal Nathwani did his schooling at Gokalibai Punamchand Pitambar High School, Mumbai. He holds a Ph.D. in management from the National Institute of Management, Ahmedabad. He holds a Professional Doctorate in Management from the National Institute of Management, Mumbai. He pursued his graduation from Mumbai.

Nathwani relocated to Vadodara and began working at the Vadodara Stock Exchange after trying his luck in Mumbai. From 30 September 2011 to 15 September 2012, he presided over the Vadodara Stock Exchange Limited Board as Chairman of the Board, and from February 2008 to 15 September 2012, he held the position of Director.

== Career ==
Parimal D. Nathwani serves as Director of Corporate Affairs at Reliance Industries Ltd. Nathwani has also served as the Vice President of the Gujarat Cricket Association during 2010-2019. He serves as Director of Gujarat Petcoke and Petroproducts P. Ltd. and Shri Dwarkadheesh Salt Works Pvt. Ltd. He served as the chairman of the Board of Vadodara Stock Exchange Limited from 30 September 2011 to 15 September 2012 and its Director from February 2008 to 15 September 2012. In 1997, he joined Reliance Industries. He led several projects for the group from the grass-root level. Nathwani holds key positions in various prestigious institutions like Reliance Rural Development Trust (RRDT)- Chairman, Dwarkadheesh Devasthan Samiti (DOS)- Vice-chairman (appointed by Govt. of Gujarat), Nathdwara Temple Board- Member (appointed by Govt. of Rajasthan), National Safety Council, Gujarat Chapter- Ex-Chairman, and Organization of Business, Commerce, and Industries (OBCI)- President. He also remained Director. Pavitra Yatradham Vikas Board was formed to improve and enhance facilities at all important Temples of Gujarat. He is an Executive Member of Lions Club of Jamnagar; Member of Rotary Club of Jamnagar, Jamnagar Chamber of Commerce and Industries and executive committee of Gujarat Chamber of Commerce and Industries.

In October 2019, Parimal Nathwani was elected as president of Gujarat State Football Association.

=== Political career ===
In 2008, Nathwani contested as an independent candidate for the Rajya Sabha from Jharkhand. UPA constituents hadn't been able to agree on a candidate, with Congress backing R. K. Anand and Jharkhand Mukti Morcha backing Kishori Lal. Nathwani won the seat with the help of five second preference votes from Jharkhand Vikas Morcha. He got re-elected as Rajya Sabha member from the tribal state in March 2014 with the support of Bharatiya Janata Party. After completing two terms as an MP from Jharkhand he is now elected as Member of Rajya Sabha from the state of Andhra Pradesh since April 2020. He joined YSR Congress Party on 11 March 2020 in the presence of Y. S. Jagan Mohan Reddy Chief Minister of Andhra Pradesh and President of YSR Congress Party.

== Journey With Reliance ==
Nathwani played a role in removing hurdles in land acquisition and facilitated the setting up of the refinery. Reliance bosses relocated Nathwani to Ahmedabad, and he gained more responsibilities in 1997. He led several projects of the group such as land acquisition for the Jamnagar refinery, setting up petroleum retail outlets, and establishing Jamnagar Special Economic Zone. Nathwani became the face of Reliance Industries Limited (RIL) in Gujarat and elsewhere.

He contributed to cross country gas transportation pipeline network, executed a telecom network for Reliance Infocomm, and helped create a consumer retail chain for the group. Since the RIL is poised to roll out a 4-G broadband network in 22 circles of the country, he is to lead the project. He remained in charge of the group's Corporate Affairs and industrial relations of the Group's establishments in Gujarat, Delhi, and Madhya Pradesh. He is part of RIL's top management.

== Role as Gujarat Cricket Association Former Vice-President ==
Nathwani was the Vice President of the Gujarat Cricket Association (GCA) from January 2010 to September 2019, overseeing GCA's project to rebuild the Motera stadium (now known as Narendra Modi Stadium) at Ahmedabad into the world's largest stadium. The previous Motera stadium was demolished. Nathwani worked with Union Home Minister Shri Amit Shah to complete the project. Nathwani also provided umbrellas to cricketers of Gujarat like Parthiv Patel, Yusuf Pathan, Irfan Pathan, and Ravindra Jadeja. Nathwani has helped the sportsmen of Jharkhand by providing them incentives during 34th National Games at Ranchi, providing cricket equipment to local sports clubs, constructing stadiums in villages, etc.

== Role as Dwarkadheesh Devasthan Samiti Ex-Vice Chairman ==
A setback in the stock market in the early 90s drew Nathwani to Krishna and Dwarkadheesh. Previously, he has served as Vice Chairman of Dwarkadheesh Devasthan Samiti. He is also a member of the Nathdwara Temple Board. He has been instrumental in the development of Dwarka, an important destination for pilgrimage tourism. The Government of Gujarat and Reliance Industries have worked together for the development of Dwarka. Renovation of Gomatighat, Dhirubhai Ambani Marg, Dwarka Parisar development, Kokila Dhiraj Dham, traffic circle and a road, floral decoration and illumination of Dwarkadheesh temple during festivals like Janmashtami, etc. have much of the credit to Nathwani and Reliance Industries. Sudama Setu, a cable-staid bridge to cross the Gomati River is the latest addition in Dwarka.

== Rajya Sabha Election History ==
Position	Party	Constituency	From	To	Tenure
Member of Parliament, Rajya Sabha (1st Term)	IND	Jharkhand	10 April 2008	9 April 2014	5 years, 364 days
Member of Parliament, Rajya Sabha (2nd Term)	IND	Jharkhand	10 April 2014	9 April 2020	5 years, 365 days
Member of Parliament, Rajya Sabha (3rd Term)	YSRCP	Andhra Pradesh	22 June 2020	21 June 2026	5 years, 364 days
Member of Parliament, Rajya Sabha (4th Term)	IND	Jharkhand	22 June 2026	21 June 2032	5 years, 365 days

== Positions held ==
- Member of Parliament (Rajya Sabha) from Andhra Pradesh
- Director - Corporate Affairs at Reliance Industries Limited (RIL)
- Member - Parliamentary Standing Committee on Science and Technology, Environment, Forests, and Climate Change
- Member - Consultative Committee, Ministry of Home Affairs
- Former Chairman - Reliance Rural Development Trust (RRDT)
- Director Dwarkadheesh Salt Works Pvt. Ltd.
- Former Group President - (Corporate Affairs and Projects), Reliance Industries Limited (RIL)
- Former Member - Standing Committee on Personnel, Public Grievances, Law & Justice
- Former Member - Standing Committee on Railways
- Former Member - Consultative Committee, Ministry of Civil Aviation
- Former Member - Select Committee on Payment & Settlement (Amendment) Bill
- Permanent Special Invitee - Consultative Committee, Ministry of External Affairs
- Former Member - Multi-sectoral Development Program Committee (MsDP), Jharkhand
- Former Member - Hindi Salahkar Samiti, Economic Affairs Division and Financial Services Division, Ministry of Finance
- Trustee in the Board of Governor's Social Welfare Fund (Gujarat)
- Former Vice President - Gujarat Cricket Association
- Ex-Vice Chairman - Dwarka Devasthan Samiti
- Former Chancellor - Shree Bruhad Gujarat Sanskrut Parishad
- Former Member - Gujarat Ayurved University Development Board
- Director - Gujarat Petcoke and Petro-products Supply Pvt. Ltd.
- Former President - Gujarat Industries Navratri Festival Society (GINFS)
- Ex-chairman - Vadodara Stock Exchange
- President - Gujarat State Football Association
- Chairman - Indian Institute of Public Health, Gandhinagar

== Bibliography ==
- ADORABLE & ADMIRABLE PARIMAL NATHWANI (27 MARCH 2021, AHMEDABAD)
- GIR LION – THE PRIDE OF GUJARAT, 1 January 2017, ISBN 9386206455

== Awards ==
Nathwani's accolades include a coveted Award for Social Service from then Governor of Gujarat Shri R.K. Trivedi.
