= Jiga Susaran Horo =

Indian politician

Member of the Jharkhand Legislative Assembly
- Incumbent
- Assumed office 2019
- Preceded by: Dinesh Oraon
- Constituency: Sisai

Personal details
- Party: Jharkhand Mukti Morcha

Jiga Susaran Horo is an Indian politician and an Member of Jharkhand Legislative Assembly from Sisai of Jharkhand as a member of Jharkhand Mukti Morcha 2019.
