= Maroo =

Maroo may refer to:

- Maroo Entertainment, South Korean company

== People with the surname ==
- Ajay Maroo (born 1958), Indian politician
- Buddhichand Maroo, founder of Shemaroo Entertainment
- Chetna Maroo (fl. 2023), British Indian author
- Raman Maroo, Indian film producer
