= Sisai Assembly constituency =

Coordinates: 23.17°N 84.76°E

Sisai
- Constituency No. 67 for the Jharkhand Legislative Assembly

Constituency details
- Country: India
- Region: East India
- State: Jharkhand
- District: Gumla
- Established: 2000
- Reservation: ST

Member of Legislative Assembly
- 5th Jharkhand Legislative Assembly
- Incumbent Jiga Susaran Horo
- Party: JMM
- Alliance: MGB
- Elected year: 2024

Sisai Assembly constituency is an assembly constituency in the Indian state of Jharkhand. It is a part of Lohardaga Lok Sabha constituency. Jiga Susaran Horo of JMM is the incumbent MLA.

== Members of the Legislative Assembly ==
Election	Member	Party
Bihar Legislative Assembly
1952	Baliya Bhagat	Jharkhand Party
1957	Kirpa Oraon	Jharkhand Party
1962	Sitaram Bhagat	Swatantra Party
1967	S. Bhagat	Indian National Congress
1969	Lalit Oraon	Bharatiya Jana Sangh
1972	Sukru Bhagat	Indian National Congress
1977	Lalit Oraon	Janata Party
1980-85: Constituency did not exist
1985	Bandi Oraon	Indian National Congress
1990	Lalit Oraon	Bharatiya Janata Party
1995	Bandi Oraon	Indian National Congress
2000	Dinesh Oraon	Bharatiya Janata Party
Jharkhand Legislative Assembly
2005	Sameer Oraon	Bharatiya Janata Party
2009	Geeta Shree Oraon	Indian National Congress
2014	Dinesh Oraon	Bharatiya Janata Party
2019	Jiga Susaran Horo	Jharkhand Mukti Morcha
2024	Jiga Susaran Horo	Jharkhand Mukti Morcha

== Election results ==
=== Assembly election 2024 ===
2024 Jharkhand Legislative Assembly election: Sisai
Party	Candidate	Votes	%	±%
JMM	Jiga Susaran Horo	106,058	55.09%	▼2.76
BJP	Arun Kumar Oraon	67,069	34.84%	▲0.70
CPI(M)	Madua Kachhap	3,994	2.07%	New
Independent	Sujit Tete	3,098	1.61%	New
Independent	Sanjay Barla	1,659	0.86%	New
Independent	Jenga Oraon	1,553	0.81%	New
BSP	Bande Kumar Tirkey	1,542	0.80%	New
NOTA	None of the Above	3,203	1.66%	▼1.43
Margin of victory		38,989	20.25%	▼3.46
Turnout		1,92,521	72.96%	▲4.09
Registered electors		2,63,873		▲12.18
JMM hold		Swing	▼2.76	

=== Assembly election 2019 ===
2019 Jharkhand Legislative Assembly election: Sisai
Party	Candidate	Votes	%	±%
JMM	Jiga Susaran Horo	93,720	57.85%	▲28.65
BJP	Dinesh Oraon	55,302	34.14%	▲3.12
JVM(P)	Lohor Main Oraon	2,154	1.33%	▼7.14
Independent	Sanjeet Minj	1,608	0.99%	New
Jharkhand Party	Sunita Topno	1,048	0.65%	▼5.38
Independent	Shashi Kant Bhagat	970	0.60%	New
NOTA	None of the Above	5,013	3.09%	▲0.83
Margin of victory		38,418	23.72%	▲21.91
Turnout		1,61,997	68.87%	▲2.89
Registered electors		2,35,231		▲8.23
JMM gain from BJP		Swing	▲26.84	

=== Assembly election 2014 ===
2014 Jharkhand Legislative Assembly election: Sisai
Party	Candidate	Votes	%	±%
BJP	Dinesh Oraon	44,472	31.01%	▲9.72
JMM	Jiga Susaran Horo	41,879	29.21%	▲13.95
INC	Geetashree Oraon	26,128	18.22%	▼16.15
JVM(P)	Ezra Bodra	12,152	8.47%	New
Jharkhand Party	Kiran Bara	8,648	6.03%	▼0.79
Independent	Shashi Kant Bhagat	1,967	1.37%	New
Independent	Sunil Kumar Kujur	1,634	1.14%	New
NOTA	None of the Above	3,247	2.26%	New
Margin of victory		2,593	1.81%	▼11.27
Turnout		1,43,396	65.98%	▲3.57
Registered electors		2,17,337		▲18.73
BJP gain from INC		Swing	▼3.35	

=== Assembly election 2009 ===
2009 Jharkhand Legislative Assembly election: Sisai
Party	Candidate	Votes	%	±%
INC	Geeta Shree Oraon	39,260	34.37%	▲3.91
BJP	Sameer Oraon	24,319	21.29%	▼9.76
JMM	Jiga Susaran Horo	17,427	15.26%	New
Jharkhand Party	Sufal Oraon	7,789	6.82%	▲3.02
AJSU	Deosharan Bhagat	7,208	6.31%	New
Independent	Baleshwar Oraon	3,217	2.82%	New
Independent	Isaac Ishwardatt Adetiya Minz	2,320	2.03%	New
Margin of victory		14,941	13.08%	▲12.50
Turnout		1,14,235	62.41%	▲1.02
Registered electors		1,83,053		▲1.94
INC gain from BJP		Swing	▲3.32	

=== Assembly election 2005 ===
2005 Jharkhand Legislative Assembly election: Sisai
Party	Candidate	Votes	%	±%
BJP	Sameer Oraon	34,217	31.04%	▼16.39
INC	Shashi Kant Bhagat	33,574	30.46%	▼1.95
Independent	Surya Mohan Oraon	6,056	5.49%	New
Independent	Bandi Oraon	5,842	5.30%	New
Independent	Johan Ekka	5,686	5.16%	New
Jharkhand Party	Sujet Tete	4,184	3.80%	▼0.08
Independent	Vijendra Vikram Oraon	3,549	3.22%	New
Margin of victory		643	0.58%	▼14.44
Turnout		1,10,221	61.38%	▲30.25
Registered electors		1,79,564		▲8.20
BJP hold		Swing	▼16.39	

=== Assembly election 2000 ===
2000 Bihar Legislative Assembly election: Sisai
Party	Candidate	Votes	%	±%
BJP	Dinesh Oraon	24,508	47.43%	New
INC	Bandi Oraon	16,745	32.41%	New
JMM	Deo Sharan Bhagat	5,884	11.39%	New
Jharkhand Party	K.D. Jojo	2,001	3.87%	New
RJD	Durga Ohdar	1,318	2.55%	New
BSP	Parsoyus Dhirkey	716	1.39%	New
JPP	Mahesh Kumar Dhan	500	0.97%	New
Margin of victory		7,763	15.02%	
Turnout		51,672	31.54%	
Registered electors		1,65,961		
BJP win (new seat)				

== See also ==
- Vidhan Sabha
- List of states of India by type of legislature
