= Vadodara Stock Exchange =

Defunct stock exchange in the city of Vadodara

Coordinates: 22.3080°N 73.1858°E

Vadodara Stock Exchange (VSE) was a stock exchange located in the city of Vadodara, and fully owned by Government of India in Western India. It was established in 1990 at Vadodara. It is the only existing stock exchange in the state of Gujarat along with Ahmedabad. It is recognized by the Securities Contract (Regulations) Act of 1956 as a permanent stock exchange.

From a humble beginning in 1986 with the Vadodara Stock Brokers' Association having 150 members, it was incorporated on 22 January 1990 as Vadodara Stock Exchange Limited. By 1999, the exchange had a total of 321 brokers, of which 65 were corporate brokers, 253 were proprietor brokers, and 3 were partnership brokers. Then, there were only 85 sub-brokers registered.

== See also ==
- List of South Asian stock exchanges
- List of stock exchanges in the Commonwealth of Nations
