= Pradip Kumar Varma =

Indian politician (born 1972)

Member of Parliament, Rajya Sabha
- Incumbent
- Assumed office 4 May 2024
- Preceded by: Samir Oraon
- Constituency: Jharkhand

National Secretary, Bharatiya Janata Party
- Incumbent
- Assumed office August 2026

State General Secretary, Bharatiya Janata Party, Jharkhand
- In office 2020–2023

Personal details
- Born: 24 February 1972 (age 54) Kolkata, West Bengal, India
- Party: Bharatiya Janata Party
- Spouse: Sarita Varma
- Education: B.Com, MBA (HR), M.A. (Hindi), PhD (Hindi)
- Website: https://www.pradipvarma.com/

Pradip Kumar Varma (born 24 February 1972) is an Indian politician, educationist, and social worker serving as a Member of Parliament in the Rajya Sabha representing Jharkhand since May 2024. A senior leader of the Bharatiya Janata Party (BJP),, he has been serving as the party's National Secretary since August 2026, and has been appointed as the co-incharge for BJP's organisational team in Uttar Pradesh. Prior to his national appointments, he held a succession of key organizational roles within the BJP's Jharkhand state unit, serving as State General Secretary from May 2020, State Vice President from 2016, and State Secretary from 2013.

== Early life and education ==
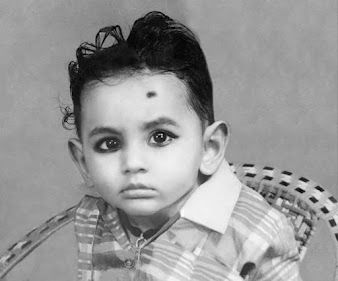
Childhood picture of Pradip Kumar Varma

Pradip Kumar Varma was born on 24 February 1972 in Kolkata, West Bengal, into a Hindu Swarnakar family. His ancestral roots lie in the Barwadih tehsil of Jharkhand's present-day Latehar district. The son of Bhagwanti Devi, a homemaker, and the late Seth Ram Autar Prasad, an employee of the Birla Group, he spent his formative years in Kolkata.

He received his early education at Subhas Vidya Mandir in Muraripukur and later attended Sarwodaya Vidyalaya in Muchipara. A competitive chess player during his youth, he participated in tournaments at the state level.

Following the completion of his intermediate studies in commerce in 1988, he attended Seth Anand Ram Jaipuria College at the University of Calcutta, where he graduated with a Bachelor of Commerce (B.Com.) degree in 1991. He subsequently pursued higher education at Vinayaka Mission University, earning both an Executive Master of Business Administration (MBA) and a Master of Arts (M.A.) in Hindi. Furthering his academic pursuits, he was awarded a Doctor of Philosophy (Ph.D.) in Hindi Literature. His doctoral thesis, titled "Ramcharitmanas Mein Parivar aur Samaj Prabandhan ke Sutra," explored the principles of family and social management within the Ramcharitmanas. A polyglot, he is fluent in Hindi, English, Bengali, Bhojpuri, Awadhi, and Nagpuri.

== Institutional leadership and Philanthropy ==
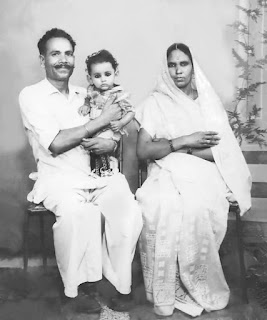
Parents of Pradip Kumar Varma

He began his professional career in healthcare administration as a manager at the Mahadevi Birla Tuberculosis Sanatorium. He later transitioned into the field of education, emerging as a prominent institution-builder in Jharkhand. He played a foundational role in establishing Mahadevi Birla Institute of Nursing and Clinical Technology in 2003, followed by Sarala Birla Public School Ranchi, in 2006 and then, Sarala Birla University, Ranchi in 2017.

Beyond academia, he remains highly active in regional sports governance. Drawing upon his early background in chess, he serves as the Chairman of the All Jharkhand Chess Association and concurrently holds the Chairmanship of the Jharkhand Wushu Association.

In his civic life, he has led numerous social welfare initiatives. He established Swantah Sukhayah, a charitable trust dedicated to uplifting underprivileged communities, and founded Public Policy for Indian People, a think tank focused on civic engagement and policy awareness. His infrastructure initiatives include providing developmental aid to local educational bodies such as the Ara Government School in Ranchi and the Anand Garodia School in Rahe. Notably, to foster political engagement among indigenous communities, he organized Jharkhand's first-ever Tribal Youth Parliament.

Deeply involved in community mobilization, he is a second-year Officers Training Camp (OTC)-trained volunteer of the Rashtriya Swayamsevak Sangh (RSS). Between 2009 and 2012, he served as the Joint Secretary of the zonal division of Seva Bharati and was a member of the RSS Prantiya Sampark Toli in Jharkhand. He is also the Chief Patron of the Akhil Bhartiya Vaishya Samiti (Jharkhand) and the Chotanagpur Sarna Samiti, the latter representing 147 panchayat blocks across the Ranchi district.

== Political career ==
His entry into public life began with student politics during his college years. Ideologically, he cites the teachings of Chanakya and Vidura, alongside the inspiring humanitarian Pandit Deendayal Upadhyaya and the political philosophy of Dr. Shyama Prasad Mukherjee, as major influences on his career.

His ascent within the state leadership of the Bharatiya Janata Party began in 2011 when he was appointed to the BJP Jharkhand State Executive Committee and named the State Co-Incharge for Training (Pradesh Sah Prashikshan Pramukh). Elevated to the position of State Secretary in 2013, he subsequently managed the party's state-level campaigns during the 2014 Indian general election. He was promoted to State Vice President in 2016. During the 2019 Jharkhand Legislative Assembly election, he was entrusted with managing the party's organizational strategy in the Dhanbad region, a campaign that yielded victories in the Dhanbad, Nirsa, Baghmara, and Sindri constituencies. In recognition of his organizational work, he was appointed State General Secretary in May 2020.

=== Parliamentary and committee roles ===
In May 2024, Varma took office as a Member of Parliament in the Rajya Sabha, representing Jharkhand. Following his entry into parliament, he has been appointed to several committees and bodies:

- Member, Parliamentary Standing Committee on Coal, Mines and Steel (since September 2024).
- Member, Consultative Committee for the Ministry of Electronics and Information Technology (since October 2024).
- Member, Institute Body of All India Institute of Mediacal Sciences(AIIMS), Deoghar (since December 2024).
- Member, Joint Parliamentary Committee on the Viksit Bharat Shiksha Adishthan Bill, 2025.
- Member, India–Georgia Parliamentary Friendship Group (since February 2026).

In August 2026, he was officially appointed as the National Secretary of the Bharatiya Janata Party.

== Publications ==
Varma has authored articles and commentaries on Indian history, culture, and figures such as Birsa Munda and Pandit Deendayal Upadhyaya. He has also written on historical events and concepts of national significance like the Hul movement and Vande Mataram. In December 2025, he authored and published the book Narendra Modi Ka Sankalp – Operation Sindoor.

== Personal life ==
Pradip Kumar Varma married Sarita Varma on 18 February 1993. The couple has two children. Their son, Aditya Vikram Varma, is a software engineer married to Arju Verma, a biotechnologist and entrepreneur from Garhwa. Their daughter, Satakchhi Priya Verma, is a practising advocate at the Jharkhand High Court and is married to Akash Ajit Kumar, who also practices as an advocate at the Jharkhand High Court.
