= Mukhtar Abbas Naqvi =

Indian politician (born 1957)

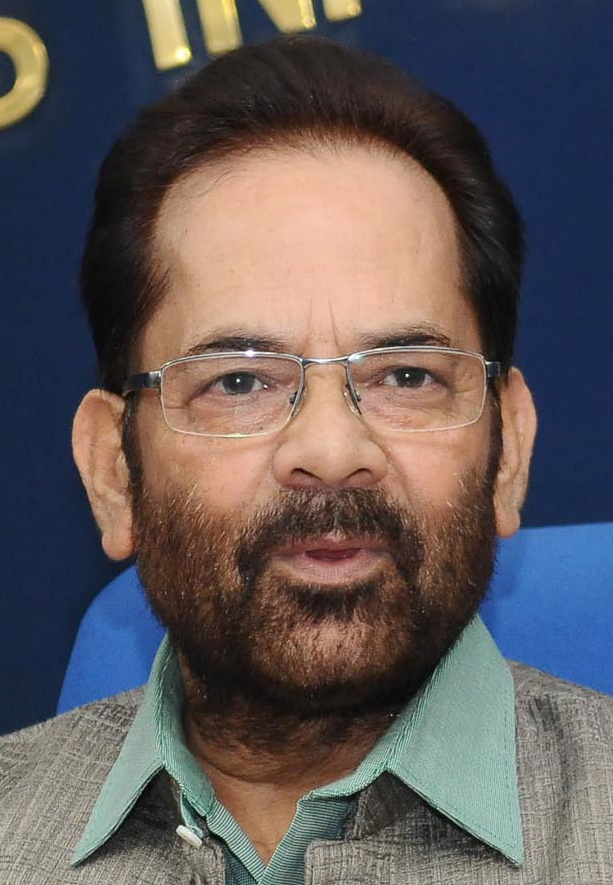
- Naqvi in 2017

Union Minister of Minority Affairs
- In office 12 July 2016 – 6 July 2022
- Prime Minister: Narendra Modi
- Preceded by: Najma Heptullah
- Succeeded by: Smriti Irani

Deputy Leader of the House in Rajya Sabha
- In office 19 July 2021 – 4 July 2022
- Leader: Piyush Goyal
- Preceded by: Piyush Goyal
- Succeeded by: Dharmendra Pradhan

Union Minister of State for Minority Affairs
- In office 26 May 2014 – 12 July 2016
- Minister: Najma Heptullah
- Preceded by: Ninong Ering
- Succeeded by: Virendra Kumar

Union Minister of State for Parliamentary Affairs
- In office 26 May 2014 – 3 September 2017
- Minister: M.Venkaiah Naidu; Ananth Kumar
- Preceded by: V Narayanasamy
- Succeeded by: Vijay Goel

Member of Parliament, Rajya Sabha
- In office 8 July 2016 – 4 July 2022
- Preceded by: M. J. Akbar
- Succeeded by: Aditya Sahu
- Constituency: Jharkhand
- In office 5 July 2010 – 4 July 2016
- Constituency: Uttar Pradesh
- In office 26 November 2002 – 25 November 2008
- Constituency: Uttar Pradesh

Personal details
- Born: 15 October 1957 (age 68) Allahabad, Uttar Pradesh, India (present-day Prayagraj)
- Party: Bharatiya Janata Party
- Spouse: Seema Naqvi (m. 1983)
- Children: 1
- Education: Bishop Johnson School; Asian Academy of Higher Studies, Noida

Mukhtar Abbas Naqvi (born 15 October 1957) is an Indian politician and was the Union Minister of Minority Affairs. He had served as a Member of Parliament in the Rajya Sabha from 2002 to 2022 and was Deputy Leader of the House in Rajya Sabha between 2021 and 2022.

Naqvi was a Member of Parliament in the Rajya Sabha from Uttar Pradesh from 2010 to 2016 and from Jharkhand from 2016 to 2022.

== Early and personal life ==
Naqvi was born to AH Naqvi and Sakina Begum on 15 October 1957 at Allahabad in Uttar Pradesh, India. He studied arts and mass communication. Naqvi married Seema Naqvi on 8 June 1983 and they have a son together.

== Political career ==
Naqvi was jailed at the age of 17 in 1975 during the period of Emergency at the Naini Central Jail in Allahabad due to his political activities. As a student leader, he had also participated in the activities of the Janata Party. Naqvi unsuccessfully contested elections for the legislative assembly of Uttar Pradesh in 1980 as a candidate of Janata Party (Secular). He also contested elections as an independent candidate in 1980 Lok Sabha elections from the Ayodhya constituency. He was elected to the 1998 Lok Sabha from Lok Sabha, and subsequently given the post of Minister of State for Ministry of Information and Broadcasting with additional charge of the Ministry of Parliamentary Affairs (2001-2003) in the Atal Bihari Vajpayee government.

He was elected to Rajya Sabha in 2016.

He became Minister of State for Minority Affairs and Parliamentary Affairs on 26 May 2014 in Narendra Modi ministry. After resignation of Najma Heptulla on 12 July 2016, he got independent charge of the Ministry of Minority Affairs.

He took oath as cabinet minister in Narendra Modi's cabinet on 30 May 2019 and continued with the Ministry of Minority Affairs.

== Views ==
=== Congress ===
According to Naqvi, a "baseless" campaign had been started by Congress party to prevent Indian Muslims from joining the Bharatiya Janata Party. Naqvi has also said that he does not harbour the allegations of Congress that as BJP came to power, there was nobody to cause riots against the minority community.

=== Muslims ===
Naqvi feels that Muslims do not desert other Muslims if they are given important posts in the Bharatiya Janata Party. For the party to increase support amongst the Muslims; he opines that they should feel that they are "equal citizens of this country", and also "understand that the bill on Muslim Personal Law will not take away their right to practise their religion". In addition, the party should also make them aware of the works done by the Vajpayee government.

Naqvi has also said that there is "no justification" for the 2002 Gujarat riots. In November 2015, when actor Aamir Khan said that he felt of leaving the country, Naqvi defended by saying that he had made the comment "in a hurry or maybe under influence from others".

=== BJP and RSS ===
Naqvi has said that Bharatiya Janata Party and the Rashtriya Swayamsevak Sangh are two "separate entities" and each of them has different views on different issues. According to him RSS is a nationalist organization and not an "anti-national" one.

== Books ==
Naqvi has written three books - Syah (1991), Danga (1998) and Vaisali (2008).

== See also ==
- Syed Zafar Islam
- Arif Mohammad Khan
- Bharatiya Janata Party

Lok Sabha
Preceded by Begum Noor Bano	Member of Parliament for Rampur; 1998 – 1999	Succeeded by Begum Noor Bano
Political offices
Preceded by Najma Heptulla	Minister of Minority Affairs; 12 July 2016 – 06 July 2022	Succeeded by Smriti Irani
