= Dinesh Oraon =

Indian politician

Dinesh Oraon is an Indian politician and leader of Bharatiya Janata Party from Jharkhand. He worked as a Speaker of Jharkhand Legislative Assembly from 2014 to 2019 and was elected twice from Sisai (Vidhan Sabha constituency) in 2000 and 2014 to the assembly.

In the 2014 assembly election he defeated Geetashree Oraon, a former minister of Indian National Congress. He did not contest the 2005 and 2009 elections. Oraon was born in Murgu, sisai Gumla district in 1962 and studied M A and earned his PhD. He served Ranchi University as lecturer.
