= Gopi Krishna Pandey =

Indian politician

Member of Parliament, Rajya Sabha
- Incumbent
- Assumed office 26 November 2026
- Preceded by: Seema Dwivedi

Personal details
- Party: Bharatiya Janata Party
- Profession: Politician

Gopi Krishna Pandey is an Indian politician who represents the Bharatiya Janata Party. A member of Parliament in the Rajya Sabha from Uttar Pradesh.
