= Maya Ivnate =

Member of Parliament, Rajya Sabha
- Incumbent
- Assumed office 2026
- Constituency: Maharastra

Personal details
- Party: Bharatiya Janata Party

Maya Chintaman Ivnate is an Indian politician. She was elected to the Rajya Sabha from Maharastra as a member of the Bharatiya Janata Party.
