= Dayanand Sahay =

Indian politician

Member of Parliament Rajya Sabha
- In office 1978–1984, 1988–1994
- Constituency: Bihar
- In office 2001–2002
- Constituency: Jharkhand

Personal details
- Born: November 15, 1932
- Died: March 20, 2002 (aged 69)
- Party: Independent
- Other political affiliations: Indian National Congress
- Spouse: Sushila Sahay

Dayanand Sahay was an Indian politician. He was a member of the Rajya Sabha, the upper house of the Parliament of India.
