= Sanjiv Kumar (Jharkhand politician) =

Indian politician

MP of Rajya Sabha for Jharkhand
- In office 4 May 2012 – 3 May 2018
- Succeeded by: Sameer Oraon, BJP

Personal details
- Party: JMM

Sanjiv Kumar is a politician from Jharkhand Mukti Morcha Party.

He was elected to Rajya Sabha from state of Jharkhand of the ticket of JMM in May 2012.
