= Dhiraj Prasad Sahu =

Indian politician and businessman

MP of Rajya Sabha for Jharkhand
- In office 4 May 2018 – 4 May 2024
- Preceded by: Pradeep Kumar Balmuchu, INC
- Succeeded by: Sarfaraz Ahmad, JMM,
- In office 24 June 2009 – 7 July 2016
- Preceded by: Yashwant Sinha
- Succeeded by: Mahesh Poddar, BJP

Personal details
- Born: 23 November 1959 (age 66) Lohardaga
- Party: Indian National Congress
- Relatives: Shiv Prasad Sahu (brother)
- Education: Marwari College, Ranchi

Dhiraj Prasad Sahu (born 23 November 1959) is an Indian businessman and a politician from the Indian National Congress Party. He was elected to Rajya Sabha from the state of Jharkhand on the ticket of INC in July 2010.

== Early life ==
He is son of social worker Baldeo Sahu and Shushila Devi. He is brother of former member of parliament Shiv Prasad Sahu. He has studied B. A. and resides at Lohardaga.

He was elected to Rajya Sabha from state of Jharkhand of the ticket of INC in July 2010.

He is son of Industrialist & social worker of the erstwhile Chotanagpur (division of State of Bihar, now Jharkhand) Late Shri Rai Sahab Baldeo Sahu, who was also involved in freedom struggle.

== Career ==
He joined politics in 1977. He was jailed during Jail Bharo Andolan in 1978. In June 2009 he was elected to Rajya Sabha and again reelected to Rajya Sabha in July 2010.

== Controversies ==
=== 2023 IT raids ===
In December 2023, the Income Tax Department conducted several raids on Sahu's premises across districts in Odisha, Jharkhand and West Bengal and over ₹353 crore (US$37 million) cash and gold has been seized. The authorities had to deploy a significant strength of officials and cash-counting machines to count the seized cash. According to the details, initially, more than 30 officers along with bank staff were involved in the counting of the seized money. To speed up the counting the notes, the IT department deployed nearly 40 large and small machines and brought in more department and bank staffers.

Indian National Congress General Secretary Jairam Ramesh on Saturday said the party "is in no way connected with the businesses" of Dhiraj Prasad Sahu, the MP in whose premises the IT department uncovered the cash stack. "Only he can explain, and should explain, how huge amounts of cash have been reportedly unearthed by the income-tax authorities from his properties," added Jairam Ramesh.

Sahu responded to the raid by saying that the money was related to his liquor firm and had nothing to do with the Congress or other parties. He refuted the BJP's allegation that the recovered cash was black money, saying that the source of the money was business firms run by him and his family.

He told people to let the Income Tax Department to decide whether the money was white or black. He has also said that he would give an account for everything.

== Election History ==
=== Rajya Sabha ===
| Position | Party | Constituency | From | To | Tenure |
|---|---|---|---|---|---|
| Member of Parliament, Rajya Sabha (1st Term) | INC | Jharkhand | 24 June 2009 | 7 July 2010 | 1 year, 13 days |
| Member of Parliament, Rajya Sabha (2nd Term) | INC | Jharkhand | 8 July 2010 | 7 July 2016 | 5 years, 365 days |
| Member of Parliament, Rajya Sabha (3rd Term) | INC | Jharkhand | 4 May 2018 | 3 May 2024 | 5 years, 365 days |
