= R. K. Anand =

Indian politician

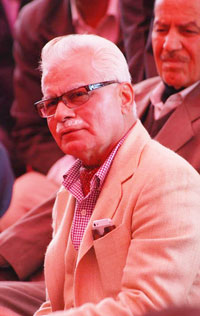
- RK Anand at Legal Aid Programme organised for Ex-Servicemen of Indian Forces

Senior Vice-President of Indian Olympic Association
- Incumbent
- Assumed office 14 December 2017
- Preceded by: Virendra D. Nanavati

Personal details
- Born: Ram Kumar Anand; 15 March 1943 (age 83) India
- Spouse: Bharti Anand (m. 1971; died 2015)
- Children: Chetan Anand; Tapeshwar Anand
- Education: University of the Punjab; DAV College, Chandigarh; Agra University

Ram Kumar Anand (born 15 March 1943) is a lawyer and former Member of Parliament, Rajya Sabha, serving during the NDA government. He is Senior Vice-President of Indian Olympic Association from 14 December 2017. He also served as the chairman of the Bar Council of Delhi for two terms and was a member of the Bar Council of Delhi for 25 years. He held the position of Vice-President of the Indian Law Institute for over 25 years.

== Life ==
Anand was born in 1943, the son of Roshan Lal Anand and his wife, Ram Lubhai Anand. He did his schooling and passed matriculation in 1958 from Punjab University. He studied at DAV College, Chandigarh and S.D. College, Palwal, (Haryana), graduating in 1963. He earned his law degree from the University of Agra in 1966.

Anand married advocate Bharti Anand on 27 September 1971. They have two sons, Chetan Anand and Tapeshwar Anand. Bharti Anand died on 27 October 2015.

== Legal career ==
=== Notable cases ===
Anand has been practising in the Supreme Court of India, Delhi High Court and other high courts since 1967. He is the only lawyer who has defended three successive sitting Prime Ministers of India. In June 1980 when Sanjay Gandhi died, his widow Menka Gandhi filed a petition for the granting of probate, which was contested. Then-Prime Minister Indira Gandhi engaged Anand in this case. Anand fought successfully before both the District Judge of Delhi and the Single Bench/Division Bench of the Delhi High Court.

Anand drafted Indira Gandhi's will, which was later given to Prime Minister Rajiv Gandhi, after her death. After the assassination of Indira Gandhi on 31 October 1984, Anand's services were engaged by Rajiv Gandhi, then Prime Minister of India, to settle probate of the will of Indira Gandhi. Anand fought the case in the Delhi High Court successfully.

After the death of Indira Gandhi major, anti-Sikh riots took place in Delhi and elsewhere. A commission was appointed under the Commission of Enquiry Act, headed by Ranganath Misra. Anand appeared before that commission on behalf of the Government of India and the police force. Anand handled the case of Air India Flight 182, in which 329 died, as well as other aircraft inquiries.

Anand also handled the case of P. V. Narasimha Rao, who was accused in three criminal cases: the Jharkhand Mukti Morcha Bribery Case (a cash-for-votes scam) the case against Godan Chandraswami for corruption, and the case of St. Kitts, where allegations were made that V.P. Singh, the former Prime Minister of India, had a foreign bank account. Anand fought the cases from trial court up to the Supreme Court of India, got bail granted to Rao, and got him acquitted in all three cases.

=== Legal troubles ===
In 1999, Anand took on the case of Sanjeev Nanda, grandson of the late Navy chief SM Nanda. Sanjeev Nanda was accused of killing six people with his BMW in a hit-and-run accident. During the case, Anand was accused of trying to influence witness Sunil Kulkarni, and was charged with contempt of court. In 2009 Anand was convicted of the contempt charge, stripped of his designation as senior counsel, barred from practising law in any Delhi court for four months, and fined Rs 2,000. Anand appealed, but his conviction was upheld in 2012. At that time he made a full apology, donated Rs 2.1 million to the Bar Council of India, and offered to work pro bono for one year.

== Political career ==
After earning his law degree, Anand began his practice in 1967. In 1972 he was elected to the State Bar Council of Delhi, where he remained a member from 1972 till 1998.

Anand was an active member of the Indian Law Institute, a research institution headed by the Ex Officio Chief Justice of India. Anand served as Vice-President for five three-year terms. He improved the institution by helping it obtain money and university status. During Anand's tenure a library was also established.

Anand has been involved in national and international sports. He has been associated with the Indian Olympic Association for over 35 years. He is the current Senior Vice-President of the Indian Olympic Association. He has been the Chairman of the Legal Commission for number of years. He created the Olympic Association in the newly established State of Jharkhand. During his tenure, in 2011 national games were organised in Jharkhand at Ranchi. He has constructed a lawn ball stadium with both his MP land fund and his own funds, which is the second-biggest stadium in India after Assam.

Anand was elected as a member of Parliament to the Rajya Sabha from Jharkhand in March 2000, during the NDA government. He was a member of the Standing Committee of Defense during his tenure as a Member of Rajya Sabha.

Anand contested General Elections in 2004 on Indian National Congress ticket from South Delhi constituency and lost the election.

He again contested General Elections in 2014 from Faridabad constituency on Indian National Lok Dal ticket. He lost the elections.

== Books written ==
Anand has written two books and numerous articles:

- Close Encounters of Niira Radia
- Assault on Merit
