= Deepak Prakash (politician) =

Indian politician

President of Bharatiya Janata Party, Jharkhand
- In office 25 February 2020 – 4 July 2023
- Preceded by: Laxman Giluwa
- Succeeded by: Babulal Marandi

Member of Parliament, Rajya Sabha
- In office 22 June 2020 – 21 June 2026
- Preceded by: Parimal Nathwani
- Constituency: Jharkhand

Personal details
- Born: 14 April 1964 (age 62) Hazaribagh, Hazaribagh district, Jharkhand
- Party: Bharatiya Janata Party
- Spouse: Shiwani Prakash
- Children: 1 son & 1 daughter
- Parents: Bipin Bihari Prasad (father); Sudha Prasad (mother)
- Education: Masters in Political Science
- Profession: Politician

Deepak Prakash is an Indian politician and a member of the Rajya Sabha from Jharkhand. He is also the ex state president of the Bharatiya Janata Party's Jharkhand Unit. He has also held the posts of vice-president and general secretary in the past in BJP's Jharkhand unit.

Prakash was initially connected with Akhil Bhartiya Vidyarthi Parishad during his early days and a member of the Rashtriya Swayamsevak Sangh. In 2020, Prakash was appointed chief of BJP Jharkhand unit.
