= Mahesh Poddar =

Indian politician

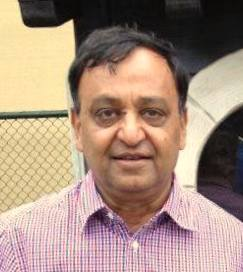

MP of Rajya Sabha for Jharkhand
- In office 8 July 2016 – 7 July 2022
- Preceded by: Dhiraj Prasad Sahu, INC
- Succeeded by: Mahua Maji, JMM
- Constituency: Jharkhand

Personal details
- Born: 14 November 1949 (age 76)
- Party: Bharatiya Janata Party
- Spouse: Nirmala Poddar
- Education: St. Xavier's College, Ranchi and M.S. Ramaiah Institute of Technology, Bangalore
- Profession: Businessman/Politician
- Website: www.mikiwire.co.in

Mahesh Poddar was a member of Rajya Sabha from the Jharkhand constituency. He is an businessman from Jharkhand.

He was the candidate for the biennial 2016 Rajya Sabha polls from Jharkhand. He won the polls by a narrow margin when his tally was increased using second preference votes. He got 2664 vote numbers as compared to 2600 vote numbers received by Jharkhand Mukti Morcha nominee Basant Soren.

== Personal life ==
He is the son of Late Shri Kedarnath Poddar, a wholesale cloth merchant from Gumla, Jharkhand. After completing his schooling in Gumla High School and St. Xavier's College, Ranchi, he moved to Bangalore to do his Mechanical Engineering from M.S. Ramaiah Institute of Technology. He is married to Nirmala Poddar and they both reside in Ranchi, Jharkhand.

== Career ==
In 1977 he established Miki Wire Works Pvt. Ltd, a pre-cast wire manufacturer in Mahilong, Ranchi. The corporation has shown relatively successful expansion nationally across India.

He has been actively involved in various groups and organisations, namely:

1. Past Chairman - Steel Wire Manufacturers Association of India (2003-2006)
2. Past President - Federation of Jharkhand Chamber of Commerce & Industries, Ranchi (1994-1995)
3. Past President - Jharkhand Small Industries Association
4. Director - Wire Association International
5. Present member of Bureau of Indian Standards sub-committee on Long Products
6. Present Trustee with Sri Sri Ravishankar Vidya Mandir Trust of Art of Living, Bangalore
