= Mahua Maji =

Indian politician

Member of Parliament, Rajya Sabha
- Incumbent
- Assumed office July 2022
- Constituency: Jharkhand

Chairperson of the Jharkhand State Women Commission
- In office 2013–2016

Personal details
- Born: 10 December 1964 (age 61) Ranchi, Jharkhand, India
- Party: Jharkhand Mukti Morcha
- Spouse: Shri Subodh Kumar Maji
- Education: Ranchi University (BA, MA, Phd)
- Profession: Politician

Mahua Maji is an Indian politician and a member of the Rajya Sabha, upper house of the Parliament of India from Jharkhand as a member of the Jharkhand Mukti Morcha. She is the chairperson of the Women's commission.
