= Parmeshwar Kumar Agarwalla =

Indian politician and coal industrialist

Member of Rajya Sabha
- In office 8 July 1992 – 7 July 1998
- Constituency: Bihar

Member of Rajya Sabha
- In office 8 July 1998 – 7 July 2002
- Constituency: Jharkhand

Personal details
- Born: Parmeshwar Kumar Agarwalla; 3 July 1937 (age 89) Dhanbad, Bihar Province, British India
- Party: Bhartiya Janata Party
- Spouse: Urmila Devi
- Children: Two sons and two daughters
- Education: Jharia and School of Mining
- Occupation: Industrialist

Parmeshwar Kumar Agarwalla was an Indian politician and coal industrialist. He was a Member of Parliament, representing Bihar in the Rajya Sabha the upper house of India's Parliament as a member of the Bhartiya Janata Party. He was re-elected to Rajya Sabha from Bihar in 1998 but in 2000, he shifted to Jharkhand post division of Bihar.

== Rajya Sabha Election History ==
Position	Party	Constituency	From	To	Tenure
Member of Parliament, Rajya Sabha (1st Term)	BJP	Bihar	8 July 1992	7 July 1998	5 years, 364 days
Member of Parliament, Rajya Sabha (2nd Term)	BJP	Bihar	8 July 1998	14 November 2000	2 years, 129 days
Member of Parliament, Rajya Sabha (3rd Term)	BJP	Jharkhand	15 November 2000	7 July 2004	3 years, 235 days
