= Aditya Sahu =

Indian politician

President of Bharatiya Janata Party – Jharkhand
- Incumbent
- Assumed office 14 January 2026
- Preceded by: Babulal Marandi

Member of Parliament, Rajya Sabha
- Incumbent
- Assumed office 8 July 2022
- Constituency: Jharkhand

Personal details
- Born: 7 October 1963 (age 62) Kuchu, Ormanjhi, Ranchi district, Bihar (present-day Jharkhand)
- Party: Bharatiya Janata Party
- Spouse: Lalita Devi (m. 1987)
- Children: 1 son & 1 daughter
- Parents: Chatur Sahu (father); Daulat Devi (mother)
- Education: Master of Commerce
- Alma mater: Ranchi University
- Profession: Professor, Politician

Aditya Sahu is an Indian politician and a member of the Rajya Sabha, upper house of the Parliament of India from Jharkhand as a member of the Bharatiya Janata Party. He is currently BJP Jharkhand President.

== Early life ==
He was born in Kuchu village of Ormanjhi of Ranchi district in state of Jharkhand. He is son of late Chatur Sahu and Daulat Devi. His two elder brother are Kaleswar Sahu and Meghnath Sahu. He had studied M.Com. He married Lalita Devi. He has one daughter and one son. He belongs to Teli community.

== Career ==
He was professor of Ram Tahal Chaudhary College till 2019. He is member of BJP since two decades. He was leader of state BJP unit from 2019. In 2022, he was elected as a member of Rajya Sabha.

== Positions held ==
Position	Organization	Period	
Lecturer	R.T.C. College, Ormanjhi, Ranchi	1989	2019
District Vice-Chairman	Twenty Point Programme	2003	2005
Independent Director	Bharat Heavy Electricals Limited	2021	2022
District Vice-President	Bharatiya Janata Party – Ranchi	1999	2003
District President	Bharatiya Janata Party – Ranchi	2009	2010
State Vice-President	Bharatiya Janata Party – Jharkhand	2015	2019
General Secretary	Bharatiya Janata Party – Jharkhand	2019	2020
State President	Bharatiya Janata Party – Jharkhand	2026	present
