= Jai Prakash Narayan Singh =

Indian politician

MP
- Constituency: Jharkhand

Personal details
- Born: 2 January 1949 (age 77) Chittoli, Siwan district, Bihar
- Party: BJP
- Spouse: Bishakha Singh
- Children: 2 sons
- As of 22 November, 2010

Jai Prakash Narayan Singh is an Indian politician who is a leader of the Bharatiya Janata Party. He was elected to the Rajya Sabha from Jharkhand in 2008.
