= Devdas Apte =

Indian politician

Member of Rajya Sabha
- In office 2 July 2002 – 9 April 2008
- Constituency: Jharkhand

Personal details
- Born: Devdas Apte; 15 June 1934 (age 92)
- Party: Bharatiya Janata Party
- Education: Nagpur University
- Occupation: Politician, Social Worker

Devdas Apte (born 15 June 1934 in Vadodara, Gujarat) is an Indian politician from Bharatiya Janata Party and a former member of the Parliament of India representing Jharkhand in the Rajya Sabha, the Upper House of the Parliament. He sat in Parliament from 2 July 2002 to 9 April 2008, when he retired. The son of Shri Kashi Nath and Shrimati Girija Apte, he received a B.A. from Nagpur University, Nagpur, and served as a social worker before going into politics.
