= Ajay Maroo =

Indian politician

Ajay Maroo (born 29 October 1958) is an Indian politician from the Bharatiya Janata Party. He represented Jharkhand in the Rajya Sabha, the upper house of the Parliament of India.
