= Sameer Oraon =

Indian politician

Samir Oraon

MP of Rajya Sabha for Jharkhand
- In office 4 May 2018 – 3 May 2024
- Preceded by: Sanjiv Kumar, JMM

Personal details
- Party: Bharatiya Janata Party

Samir Oraon is a prominent tribal leader of BJP from the state of Jharkhand. He is currently the National President BJP Scheduled Tribe wing. He was a member of Rajya Sabha from Jharkhand (2018–24).
