= List of Rajya Sabha members from West Bengal =

Members of Parliament from West Bengal, India

The Rajya Sabha (meaning the "Council of States") is the upper house of the Parliament of India. West Bengal elects 16 seats and they are indirectly elected by the state legislators of West Bengal. The number of seats, allocated to the party, are determined by the number of seats a party possesses during nomination and the party nominates a member to be voted on. Elections within the state legislatures are held using Single transferable vote with proportional representation.

== Current members ==
Keys: MAITC (09) BJP (07)

#	Name	Party	Term start	Term end
1	Babul Supriyo	MAITC	03-Apr-2026	02-Apr-2032
2	Menaka Guruswamy	MAITC	03-Apr-2026	02-Apr-2032
3	Rajeev Kumar	MAITC	03-Apr-2026	02-Apr-2032
4	Nadimul Haque	MAITC	03-Apr-2024	02-Apr-2030
5	Mamata Bala Thakur	MAITC	03-Apr-2024	02-Apr-2030
6	Sagarika Ghose	MAITC	03-Apr-2024	02-Apr-2030
7	Derek O'Brien	MAITC	19-Aug-2023	18-Aug-2029
8	Dola Sen	MAITC	19-Aug-2023	18-Aug-2029
9	Samirul Islam	MAITC	19-Aug-2023	18-Aug-2029
10	Rahul Sinha	BJP	03-Apr-2026	02-Apr-2032
11	Samik Bhattacharya	BJP	03-Apr-2024	02-Apr-2030
12	Ananta Maharaj	BJP	19-Aug-2023	18-Aug-2029
13	Sushmita Dev	BJP	17-Jul-2026	02-Apr-2030
14	Prakash Chik Baraik	BJP	17-Jul-2026	18-Aug-2029
15	Sukhendu Sekhar Roy	BJP	17-Jul-2026	18-Aug-2029
16	Koel Mallick	BJP	10-Oct-2026	02-Apr-2032

== Chronological list of all Rajya Sabha members from West Bengal state ==
Name	Party	Term start	Term end	Term(s)	Notes
Koel Mallick	BJP	10-Oct-2026	02-Apr-2032	2	
Sushmita Dev	BJP	17-July-2026	02-Apr-2030	3	
Prakash Chik Baraik	BJP	17-July-2026	18-Aug-2029	2	
Sukhendu Sekhar Roy	BJP	17-July-2026	18-Aug-2029	4	
Babul Supriyo	TMC	03-Apr-2026	02-Apr-2032	1	
Menaka Guruswamy	TMC	03-Apr-2026	02-Apr-2032	1	
Koel Mallick	TMC	03-Apr-2026	16-Jul-2026	1	resigned
Rajeev Kumar	TMC	03-Apr-2026	02-Apr-2032	1	
Rahul Sinha	BJP	03-Apr-2026	02-Apr-2032	1	
Nadimul Haque	TMC	03-Apr-2024	02-Apr-2030	3	
Mamata Bala Thakur	TMC	03-Apr-2024	02-Apr-2030	1	
Sagarika Ghose	TMC	03-Apr-2024	02-Apr-2030	1	
Sushmita Dev	TMC	03-Apr-2024	10-Jun-2026	2	resigned
Samik Bhattacharya	BJP	03-Apr-2024	02-Apr-2030	1	
Derek O'Brien	TMC	19-Aug-2023	18-Aug-2029	3	
Dola Sen	TMC	19-Aug-2023	18-Aug-2029	3	
Samirul Islam	TMC	19-Aug-2023	18-Aug-2029	1	
Prakash Chik Baraik	TMC	19-Aug-2023	11-Jun-2026	1	resigned
Sukhendu Sekhar Roy	TMC	19-Aug-2023	08-Jun-2026	3	resigned
Anant Maharaj	BJP	19-Aug-2023	18-Aug-2029	1	
Saket Gokhale	TMC	18-Jul-2023	02-Apr-2026	1	bye - resignation of Luizinho Faleiro
Luizinho Faleiro	TMC	24-Nov-2021	11-Apr-2023	1	resigned bye - resignation of Arpita Ghosh
Sushmita Dev	TMC	27-Sep-2021	18-Aug-2023	1	bye - resignation of Manas Bhunia
Ritabrata Banerjee	TMC	20-Dec-2024	02-Apr-2026	2	bye - resignation of Jawhar Sircar
Jawhar Sircar	TMC	03-Aug-2021	08-Sep-2024	1	resignedbye - resignation of Dinesh Trivedi
Dinesh Trivedi	TMC	03-Apr-2020	12-Feb-2021	2	resigned
Arpita Ghosh	TMC	03-Apr-2020	15-Sep-2021	1	resigned
Mausam Noor	TMC	03-Apr-2020	05-Jan-2026	1	resigned
Subrata Bakshi	TMC	03-Apr-2020	02-Apr-2026	1	
Bikash Ranjan Bhattacharya	CPM	03-Apr-2020	02-Apr-2026	1	
Nadimul Haque	TMC	03-Apr-2018	02-Apr-2024	2	
Abir Biswas	TMC	03-Apr-2018	02-Apr-2024	1	
Santanu Sen	TMC	03-Apr-2018	02-Apr-2024	1	
Subhasish Chakraborty	TMC	03-Apr-2018	02-Apr-2024	1	
Abhishek Singhvi	INC	03-Apr-2018	02-Apr-2024	1	
Derek O'Brien	TMC	19-Aug-2017	18-Aug-2023	2	
Sukhendu Sekhar Roy	TMC	19-Aug-2017	18-Aug-2023	2	
Dola Sen	TMC	19-Aug-2017	18-Aug-2023	2	
Shanta Chhetri	TMC	19-Aug-2017	18-Aug-2023	1	
Manas Bhunia	TMC	19-Aug-2017	02-May-2021	1	elected to Sabang Assembly
Pradip Bhattacharya	INC	19-Aug-2017	18-Aug-2023	2	
Manish Gupta	TMC	14-Mar-2017	02-Apr-2020	1	bye - resignation of Mithun Chakraborty
Dola Sen	TMC	14-Mar-2015	18-Aug-2017	1	bye - resignation of Srinjoy Bose
Mithun Chakraborty	TMC	03-Apr-2014	26-Dec-2016	1	resigned
Jogen Chowdhury	TMC	03-Apr-2014	02-Apr-2020	1	
Ahmed Hassan Imran	TMC	03-Apr-2014	02-Apr-2020	1	
Kanwar Deep Singh	TMC	03-Apr-2014	02-Apr-2020	1	
Ritabrata Banerjee	CPM	03-Apr-2014	02-Apr-2020	1	
Kunal Ghosh	TMC	03-Apr-2012	02-Apr-2018	1	
Vivek Gupta	TMC	03-Apr-2012	02-Apr-2018	1	
Nadimul Haque	TMC	03-Apr-2012	02-Apr-2018	1	
Mukul Roy	TMC	03-Apr-2012	11-Oct-2017	2	resigned
Tapan Kumar Sen	CPM	03-Apr-2012	02-Apr-2018	2	
Sukhendu Sekhar Roy	TMC	19-Aug-2011	18-Aug-2017	1	
Derek O'Brien	TMC	19-Aug-2011	18-Aug-2017	1	
Debabrata Bandyopadhyay	TMC	19-Aug-2011	18-Aug-2017	1	
Srinjoy Bose	TMC	19-Aug-2011	05-Feb-2015	1	resigned
Pradip Bhattacharya	INC	19-Aug-2011	18-Aug-2017	1	
Sitaram Yechury	CPM	19-Aug-2011	18-Aug-2017	2	
Barun Mukherji	AIFB	18-Nov-2008	02-Apr-2014	2	bye - resignation of Debabrata Biswas
Shyamal Chakraborty	CPM	03-Apr-2008	02-Apr-2014	1	
Prasanta Chatterjee	CPM	03-Apr-2008	02-Apr-2014	2	
Tarini Kanta Roy	CPM	03-Apr-2008	02-Apr-2014	2	
Debabrata Biswas	AIFB	03-Apr-2008	23-Sep-2008	4	resigned
Ahmed Saeed Malihabadi	Ind	03-Apr-2008	02-Apr-2014	1	
R. C. Singh	CPI	25-Jun-2008	02-Apr-2012	1	bye - resignation of Barun Mukherji
Mohammed Amin	CPM	17-May-2007	18-Aug-2011	2	bye - death of Chittabrata Majumdar
Moinul Hassan	CPM	03-Apr-2006	02-Apr-2012	1	
Saman Pathak	CPM	03-Apr-2006	02-Apr-2012	1	
Tapan Kumar Sen	CPM	03-Apr-2006	02-Apr-2012	1	
Barun Mukherji	AIFB	03-Apr-2006	06-May-2008	1	resigned
Mukul Roy	TMC	03-Apr-2006	02-Apr-2012	1	
Brinda Karat	CPM	19-Aug-2005	18-Aug-2011	1	
Sitaram Yechury	CPM	19-Aug-2005	18-Aug-2011	1	
Chittabrata Majumdar	CPM	19-Aug-2005	20-Feb-2007	2	expired
Abani Roy	RSP	19-Aug-2005	18-Aug-2011	3	
Arjun Kumar Sengupta	Ind	19-Aug-2005	26-Sep-2010	1	expired
Swapan Sadhan Bose	TMC	19-Aug-2005	18-Aug-2011	1	
Chittabrata Majumdar	CPM	30-Jun-2004	18-Aug-2005	1	bye - resignation of Pranab Mukherjee
Sheikh Khabir Uddin Ahmed	CPM	03-Apr-2002	02-Apr-2008	1	
Prasanta Chatterjee	CPM	03-Apr-2002	02-Apr-2008	1	
Tarini Kanta Roy	CPM	03-Apr-2002	02-Apr-2008	1	
Debabrata Biswas	AIFB	03-Apr-2002	02-Apr-2008	3	
Dinesh Trivedi	TMC	03-Apr-2002	02-Apr-2008	1	
Biplab Dasgupta	CPM	03-Apr-2000	17-Jul-2005	2	expired
Nilotpal Basu	CPM	03-Apr-2000	02-Apr-2006	2	
Dipankar Mukherjee	CPM	03-Apr-2000	02-Apr-2006	2	
Manoj Bhattacharya	RSP	03-Apr-2000	02-Apr-2006	1	
Jayanta Bhattacharya	Ind	03-Apr-2000	02-Apr-2006	1	
Sarla Maheshwari	CPM	19-Aug-1999	18-Aug-2005	2	
Chandrakala Pandey	CPM	19-Aug-1999	18-Aug-2005	2	
Jibon Roy	CPM	19-Aug-1999	18-Aug-2005	2	
Abani Roy	RSP	19-Aug-1999	18-Aug-2005	2	
Shankar Roychowdhury	Ind	19-Aug-1999	18-Aug-2005	1	
Pranab Mukherjee	INC	19-Aug-1999	13-May-2004	4	elected to Jangipur Lok Sabha
Abani Roy	RSP	24-Mar-1998	18-Aug-1999	1	bye - death of Tridib Chaudhuri
Bharati Ray	CPM	03-Apr-1996	02-Apr-2002	1	
Dawa Lama	CPM	03-Apr-1996	02-Apr-2002	1	
Mohammed Salim	CPM	03-Apr-1996	10-May-2001	2	elected to Entally Assembly
Bratin Sengupta	CPM	03-Apr-1996	02-Apr-2002	1	
Debabrata Biswas	AIFB	03-Apr-1996	02-Apr-2002	2	
Nilotpal Basu	CPM	03-Apr-1994	02-Apr-2000	1	
Biplab Dasgupta	CPM	03-Apr-1994	02-Apr-2000	1	
Dipankar Mukherjee	CPM	03-Apr-1994	02-Apr-2000	1	
Gurudas Dasgupta	CPI	03-Apr-1994	02-Apr-2000	3	
Joyanta Ray	AIFB	03-Apr-1994	02-Apr-2000	1	
Ram Narayan Goswami	CPM	19-Aug-1993	18-Aug-1999	3	
Ashok Mitra	CPM	19-Aug-1993	18-Aug-1999	1	
Chandrakala Pandey	CPM	19-Aug-1993	18-Aug-1999	1	
Jibon Roy	CPM	19-Aug-1993	18-Aug-1999	1	
Tridib Chaudhuri	RSP	19-Aug-1993	21-Dec-1997	2	expired
Pranab Mukherjee	INC	19-Aug-1993	18-Aug-1999	3	
Sarla Maheshwari	CPM	03-Apr-1990	02-Apr-1996	1	
Ratna Bahadur Rai	CPM	03-Apr-1990	02-Apr-1996	2	
Mohammed Salim	CPM	03-Apr-1990	02-Apr-1996	1	
Debabrata Biswas	AIFB	03-Apr-1990	02-Apr-1996	1	
Ashoke Kumar Sen	JD	03-Apr-1990	02-Apr-1996	1	
Ratna Bahadur Rai	CPM	23-Mar-1989	02-Apr-1990	1	bye - death of T. S. Gurung
Mohammed Amin	CPM	03-Apr-1988	02-Apr-1994	1	
Ashis Sen	CPM	03-Apr-1988	02-Apr-1994	1	
Sukomal Sen	CPM	03-Apr-1988	02-Apr-1994	2	
Gurudas Dasgupta	CPI	03-Apr-1988	02-Apr-1994	2	
Saurin Bhattacharjee	RSP	03-Apr-1988	02-Apr-1994	2	
Ram Narayan Goswami	CPM	10-Jul-1987	09-Jul-1993	2	
Samar Mukherjee	CPM	10-Jul-1987	09-Jul-1993	2	
Ramendra Kumar Podder	CPM	10-Jul-1987	09-Jul-1993	2	
Sunil Basuray	CPM	10-Jul-1987	09-Jul-1993	1	
Dipen Ghosh	CPM	10-Jul-1987	09-Jul-1993	2	
Tridib Chaudhuri	RSP	10-Jul-1987	09-Jul-1993	1	
Samar Mukherjee	CPM	29-Dec-1986	09-Jul-1987	1	bye -
Ram Narayan Goswami	CPM	22-Oct-1986	09-Jul-1987	1	bye - death of Sankar Prasad Mitra
T. S. Gurung	CPM	14-Mar-1986	13-Jan-1989	1	expired bye - resignation of Badri Narayan Pradhan
Chitta Basu	AIFB	02-Dec-1985	27-Nov-1989	2	elected to Barasat Lok Sabha bye - death of Amar Prasad Chakraborty
Gurudas Dasgupta	CPI	12-Mar-1985	02-Apr-1988	1	bye - death of Kalyan Roy
Ramendra Kumar Podder	CPM	12-Mar-1985	09-Jul-1987	1	bye - death of Arabinda Ghosh
Shantimoy Ghosh	CPM	18-Sep-1984	09-Jul-1987	1	bye - death of Santosh Mitra
Kanak Mukherjee	CPM	03-Apr-1984	02-Apr-1990	2	
Mostafa Bin Qausem	CPM	03-Apr-1984	02-Apr-1990	1	
Badri Narayan Pradhan	CPM	03-Apr-1984	22-Jan-1986	1	resigned
Amar Prasad Chakraborty	AIFB	03-Apr-1984	27-Oct-1985	2	expired
Deba Prasad Ray	INC	03-Apr-1984	02-Apr-1990	1	
Nepaldev Bhattacharjee	CPM	03-Apr-1982	02-Apr-1988	2	
Nirmal Chatterjee	CPM	03-Apr-1982	02-Apr-1988	1	
Sukomal Sen	CPM	03-Apr-1982	02-Apr-1988	1	
Kalyan Roy	CPI	10-July-1969	31-Jan-1985	3	expired
Ramkrishna Mazumder	AIFB	03-Apr-1982	02-Apr-1988	1	
Nepaldev Bhattacharjee	CPM	28-Sep-1981	02-Apr-1982	1	bye - resignation of Bhupesh Gupta
Debendra Nath Barman	CPM	10-Jul-1981	09-Jul-1987	1	
Arabinda Ghosh	CPM	10-Jul-1981	17-Jan-1985	1	expired
Santosh Mitra	CPM	10-Jul-1981	23-Apr-1984	1	expired
Dipen Ghosh	CPM	10-Jul-1981	09-Jul-1987	1	
Makhan Paul	RSP	10-Jul-1981	09-Jul-1987	1	
Sankar Prasad Mitra	Ind	10-Jul-1981	09-Aug-1986	1	expired
Sangdopal Lepcha	CPM	11-Mar-1980	02-Apr-1984	1	bye - resignation of Ananda Pathak
Ananda Pathak	CPM	03-Apr-1978	09-Jan-1980	2	elected to Darjeeling Lok Sabha
Syed Shahedullah	CPM	03-Apr-1978	02-Apr-1984	1	
Kanak Mukherjee	CPM	03-Apr-1978	02-Apr-1984	1	
Saurin Bhattacharjee	RSP	03-Apr-1978	02-Apr-1984	1	
Amar Prasad Chakraborty	AIFB	03-Apr-1978	02-Apr-1984	1	
Ananda Pathak	CPM	13-Jul-1977	02-Apr-1978	1	bye - resignation of Krishna Bahadur Chhetri
Sankar Ghose	INC	03-Apr-1976	02-Apr-1982	1	
Prasenjit Barman	INC	03-Apr-1976	02-Apr-1982	1	
Phanindra Nath Hansda	INC	03-Apr-1976	02-Apr-1982	1	
Purabi Mukhopadhyay	INC	03-Apr-1976	02-Apr-1982	2	
Bhupesh Gupta	CPI	03-Apr-1976	06-Aug-1981	5	expired
Pranab Mukherjee	INC	10-Jul-1975	09-Jul-1981	2	
Jaharlal Banerjee	INC	10-Jul-1975	09-Jul-1981	1	
Pratima Bose	INC	10-Jul-1975	09-Jul-1981	1	
D. P. Chattopadhyaya	INC	10-Jul-1975	09-Jul-1981	2	
Ahmad Hossain Mondal	INC	10-Jul-1975	09-Jul-1981	1	
Kalyan Roy	CPI	10-Jul-1975	09-Jul-1981	2	
Sardar Amjad Ali	INC	03-Apr-1972	02-Apr-1978	1	
Rajat Kumar Chakrabarti	INC	03-Apr-1972	02-Apr-1978	1	
Krishna Bahadur Chhetri	INC	03-Apr-1972	22-Mar-1977	1	elected to Darjeeling Lok Sabha
Kali Mukherjee	INC	03-Apr-1972	02-Apr-1978	1	
Sanat Kumar Raha	CPI	03-Apr-1972	02-Apr-1978	1	
Salil Kumar Ganguli	CPM	03-Apr-1970	02-Apr-1976	1	
Sasankasekhar Sanyal	CPM	03-Apr-1970	02-Apr-1976	1	
Dwijendralal Sen Gupta	Ind	03-Apr-1970	02-Apr-1976	2	
Bhupesh Gupta	CPI	03-Apr-1970	02-Apr-1976	4	
Purabi Mukhopadhyay	INC	03-Apr-1970	02-Apr-1976	1	
Monoranjan Roy	CPM	10-Jul-1969	09-Jul-1975	1	
Niren Ghosh	CPM	10-Jul-1969	09-Jul-1975	2	
Kalyan Roy	CPI	10-Jul-1969	09-Jul-1975	1	
Suhrid Mullick Chowdhury	AIFB	10-Jul-1969	09-Jul-1975	1	
D. P. Chattopadhyaya	INC	10-Jul-1969	09-Jul-1975	1	
Pranab Mukherjee	INC	10-Jul-1969	09-Jul-1975	1	
Mriganka Mohan Sur	INC	03-Apr-1966	02-Apr-1972	3	
Biren Roy	INC	03-Apr-1966	02-Apr-1972	2	
Rajpat Singh Doogar	INC	03-Apr-1966	02-Apr-1972	4	
Chitta Basu	AIFB	03-Apr-1966	02-Apr-1972	1	
Arun Prakash Chatterjee	CPM	03-Apr-1966	02-Apr-1972	1	
Debabrata Mookerjee	INC	04-Nov-1965	02-Apr-1968	1	bye - resignation of Niharranjan Ray
Phulrenu Guha	INC	03-Apr-1964	02-Apr-1970	1	
Muhammad Ishaque	INC	03-Apr-1964	02-Apr-1970	2	
Satyendra Prosad Ray	INC	03-Apr-1964	02-Apr-1970	3	
Dwijendralal Sen Gupta	Ind	03-Apr-1964	02-Apr-1970	1	
Bhupesh Gupta	CPI	03-Apr-1964	02-Apr-1970	3	
Ram Kumar Bhuwalka	INC	09-Sep-1963	02-Apr-1968	1	bye - death of Pannalal Saraogi
Nikunja Behari Maiti	INC	25-Apr-1962	02-Apr-1966	1	bye - resignation of Abha Maiti
Ram Prasanna Ray	INC	03-Apr-1962	02-Apr-1968	1	
Niharranjan Ray	INC	03-Apr-1962	01-Jun-1965	2	resigned
Pannalal Saraogi	INC	03-Apr-1962	13-Aug-1963	1	expired
Surendra Mohan Ghose	INC	03-Apr-1962	02-Apr-1968	2	
Niren Ghosh	CPM	03-Apr-1962	02-Apr-1968	1	
Syed Nausher Ali	CPI	03-Apr-1962	02-Apr-1968	2	
Muhammad Ishaque	INC	29-Dec-1961	02-Apr-1964	1	
Sudhir Ghosh	INC	03-Apr-1960	02-Apr-1966	1	
Abha Maiti	INC	03-Apr-1960	04-Mar-1962	1	elected to West Bengal Legislative Assembly
Rajpat Singh Doogar	INC	03-Apr-1960	02-Apr-1966	3	
Mriganka Mohan Sur	INC	03-Apr-1960	02-Apr-1966	2	
Biren Roy	INC	03-Apr-1960	02-Apr-1966	1	
Ansaruddin Ahmed	INC	03-Apr-1958	02-Apr-1964	1	
Santosh Kumar Basu	INC	03-Apr-1958	02-Apr-1964	2	
Maya Devi Chettry	INC	03-Apr-1958	02-Apr-1964	2	
Bhupesh Gupta	CPI	03-Apr-1958	02-Apr-1964	2	
Atindra Nath Bose	PSP	03-Apr-1958	27-Nov-1961	1	expired
Surendra Mohan Ghose	INC	13-Dec-1956	02-Apr-1962	1	
Mehr Chand Khanna	INC	15-Dec-1956	26-Feb-1962	1	elected to New Delhi Lok Sabha
Prabhu Dayal Himatsingka	INC	03-Apr-1956	02-Apr-1962	1	
Humayun Kabir	INC	03-Apr-1956	02-Apr-1962	1	
Satyendra Prosad Ray	INC	03-Apr-1956	02-Apr-1962	2	
Satyapriya Banerjee	AIFB	03-Apr-1956	23-Mar-1957	2	expired
Charu Chandra Biswas	INC	03-Apr-1954	02-Apr-1960	2	
Nalinaksha Dutt	INC	03-Apr-1954	02-Apr-1960	2	
Rajpat Singh Doogar	INC	03-Apr-1954	02-Apr-1960	2	
Suresh Chandra Majumdar	INC	03-Apr-1954	12-Aug-1954	2	expired
Abdur Rezzak Khan	CPI	03-Apr-1954	02-Apr-1960	1	
Niharranjan Ray	INC	03-May-1957	02-Apr-1962	1	
Santosh Kumar Basu	INC	03-May-1957	02-Apr-1958	1	
Sitaram Daga	INC	03-May-1957	02-Apr-1958	1	
Mriganka Mohan Sur	INC	13-Sep-1954	02-Apr-1960	1	
Charu Chandra Biswas	INC	03-Apr-1952	02-Apr-1954	1	
Nalinaksha Dutt	INC	03-Apr-1952	02-Apr-1954	1	
Rajpat Singh Doogar	INC	03-Apr-1952	02-Apr-1954	1	
Suresh Chandra Majumdar	INC	03-Apr-1952	02-Apr-1954	1	
Debaprasad Ghosh	BJS	03-Apr-1952	02-Apr-1954	1	
Syed Nausher Ali	INC	03-Apr-1952	02-Apr-1956	1	
Satyendra Prosad Ray	INC	03-Apr-1952	02-Apr-1956	1	
Indra Bhushan Beed	INC	03-Apr-1952	02-Apr-1956	1	
Satyapriya Banerjee	AIFB	03-Apr-1952	02-Apr-1956	1	
Beni Prasad Agarwal	INC	03-Apr-1952	02-Apr-1958	1	
Maya Devi Chettry	INC	03-Apr-1952	02-Apr-1958	1	
Bimal Comar Ghosh	PSP	03-Apr-1952	21-Mar-1957	1	elected to Barrackpore Lok Sabha
Satyendra Mazumdar	CPI	03-Apr-1952	05-Apr-1957	1	
Bhupesh Gupta	CPI	03-Apr-1952	02-Apr-1958	1	
