= 2005 Rajya Sabha elections =

Elections for the upper house of Indian Parliament

(of 228 seats) to the Rajya Sabha
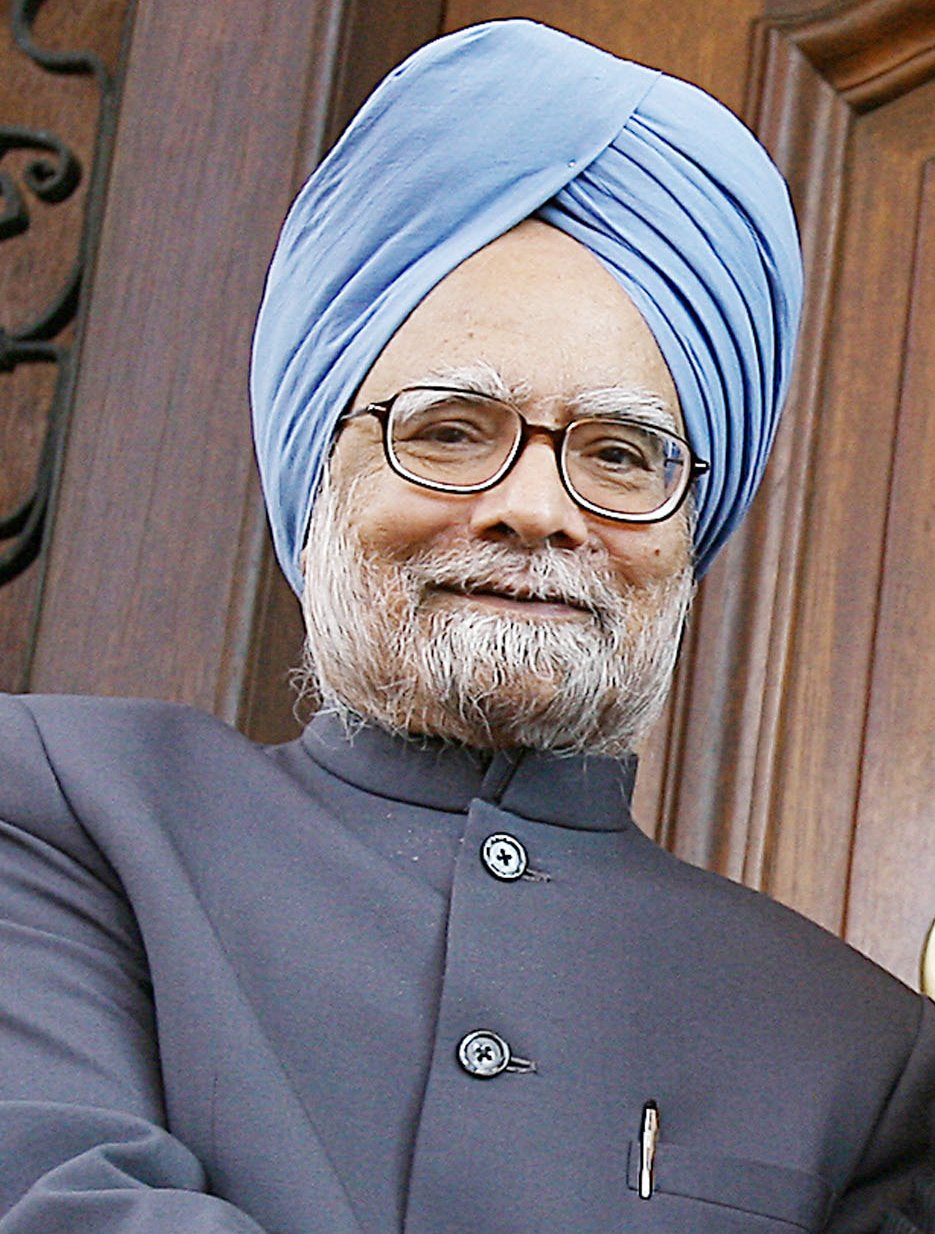

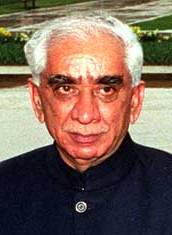
	First party	Second party
Leader	Manmohan Singh	Jaswant Singh
Party	INC	BJP

Rajya Sabha elections were held on various dates in 2005, to elect members of the Rajya Sabha, Indian Parliament's upper chamber. One member from Goa, three members from Gujarat and 6 members from West Bengal were elected.

== Elections ==
Elections were held to elect members from various states.

=== Members elected ===
The following members are elected in the elections held in 2005. They are members for the term 2005-2011 and retire in year 2011, except in case of the resignation or death before the term.

=== Goa ===
Seat No	Previous MP	Previous Party	Elected MP	Elected Party	Reference
1.	Eduardo Faleiro	INC	Shantaram Naik	INC	

=== Gujarat ===
Seat No	Previous MP	Previous Party	Elected MP	Elected Party	Reference
1.	Ahmed Patel	INC	Ahmed Patel	INC	
2.	Lalitbhai Mehta	BJP	Suryakantbhai Acharya	BJP	
3.	Savitaben V Sharda	BJP	Surendra Motilal Patel	BJP	

=== West Bengal ===
Seat No	Previous MP	Previous Party	Elected MP	Elected Party	Reference
1.	Abani Roy	RSP	Abani Roy	RSP	
2.	Chandrakala Pandey	CPI(M)	Sitaram Yechury	CPI(M)	
3.	Chittabrata Majumdar	CPI(M)	Chittabrata Majumdar	CPI(M)	
4.	Jibon Bihari Roy	CPI(M)	Brinda Karat	CPI(M)	
5.	Sarla Maheshwari	CPI(M)	Swapan Sadhan Bose	AITC	
6.	Shankar Roy Chowdhury	IND	Arjun Kumar Sengupta	IND	

== Bye-elections ==
The following bye elections were held in the year 2005.

State - Member - Party

- Bye-elections were held on 30/04/2005 for vacancy from Maharashtra due to resignation of seating member Nirupam on 18/03/2005 with term ending on 02/04/2006
- Bye-elections were held on 03/06/2005 for vacancy from Jharkhand and Kerala due to elections to JH Assembly of seating member Stephen Marandi on 16 March, 2005 with term ending on 07/07/2010 and resignation of seating member K. Karunakaran on 19/01/2007 with term ending on 02/04/2010
