= 2029 Rajya Sabha elections =

Elections for the upper house of Indian Parliament

- 2029

12 of the 233 (Note: excluding 12 nominated seats) elected seats in the Rajya Sabha 123 (Note: out of 245(including 12 nominated seats)) total seats needed for a majority
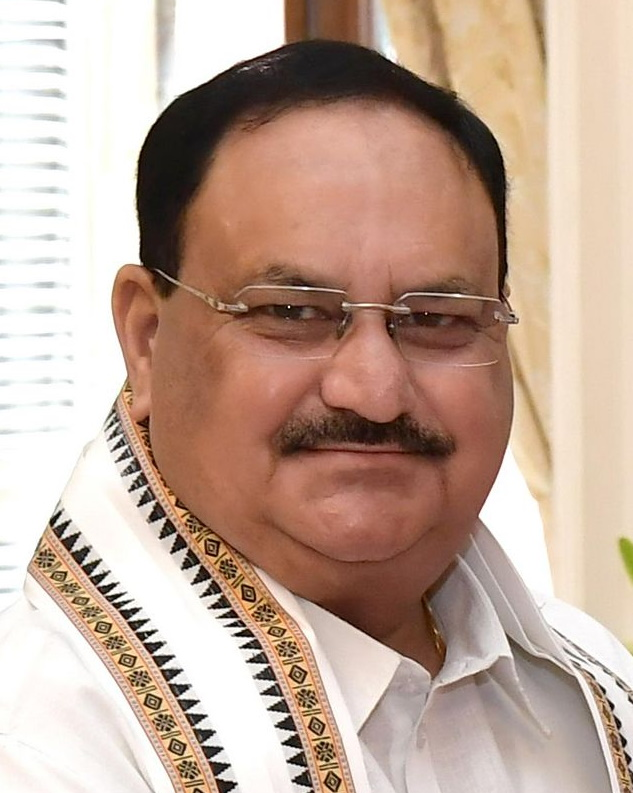

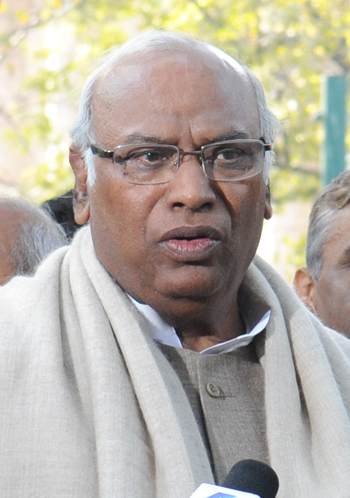
	First party	Second party
Leader	J. P. Nadda	Mallikarjun Kharge
Party	BJP	INC
Alliance	NDA	INDIA
Leader since	24 June 2024	16 February 2021

The 2029 Rajya Sabha elections will be held as part of a routine six-year cycle of the upper house of the Parliament of India to elect 10 of its 245 members, of which the states through their legislators elect 233, and the remaining 12 are appointed by the President.

== Members retiring ==
=== Goa ===
#	Previous MP	Party	Term end	Elected MP	Party
1	Sadanand Tanavade	BJP	28-Jul-2029	TBD	

=== Gujarat ===
#	Previous MP	Party	Term end	Elected MP	Party
1	S. Jaishankar	BJP	18-Aug-2029	TBD	
2	Kesridevsinh Jhala	BJP	18-Aug-2029	TBD	
3	Babubhai Desai	BJP	18-Aug-2029	TBD	

=== West Bengal ===
#	Previous MP	Party	Term end	Elected MP	Party
1	Anant Maharaj	BJP	18-Aug-2029		BJP
2	Prakash Chik Baraik	BJP	18-Aug-2029		BJP
3	Sukhendu Sekhar Roy	BJP	18-Aug-2029		BJP
4	Derek O'Brien	MAITC	18-Aug-2029		BJP
5	Samirul Islam	MAITC	18-Aug-2029		DTC
6	Dola Sen	MAITC	18-Aug-2029		(Note: Quota = 294 ÷ (6+1) + 1 = 43 votes. With 294 total MLAs, a candidate requires 43 first-preference votes to secure a seat. A party needs 215 votes to clear the quota for 5 seats outright. If no party holds enough surplus to meet the 43-vote threshold for the final slot, the 6th seat is determined by the elimination process and the transfer of remaining surplus votes or smaller group preferences.)

== See also ==
- 2029 elections in India
- List of current members of the Rajya Sabha
