= 1999 Rajya Sabha elections =

Elections for the upper house of Indian Parliament

(of 228 seats) to the Rajya Sabha
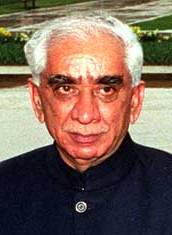

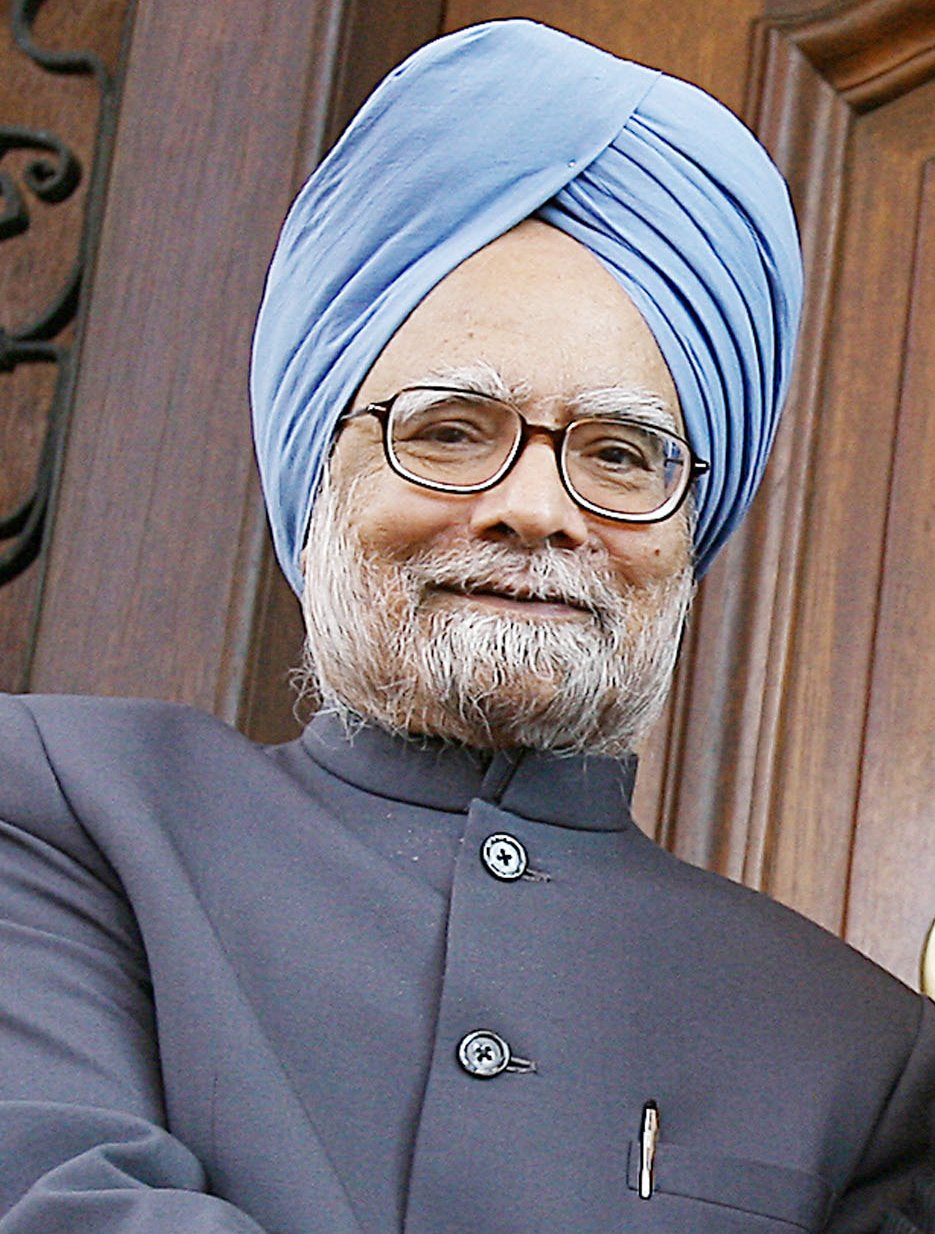
	First party	Second party
Leader	Jaswant Singh	Manmohan Singh
Party	BJP	INC

Rajya Sabha elections were held on various dates in 1999, to elect members of the Rajya Sabha, Indian Parliament's upper chamber. 1 member from Goa, 3 members from Gujarat and 6 members from West Bengal were elected.

== Elections ==
Elections were held to elect members from various states.

=== Members elected ===
The following members are elected in the elections held in 1999. They are members for the term 1999–2005 and retire in year 2005, except in case of the resignation or death before the term. The list is incomplete.

State - Member - Party

Rajya Sabha members for term 1999–2005
State	Member Name	Party	Remark
Goa	Faleiro Eduardo Martinho	INC	R
Gujarat	Ahmed Patel	INC	
Gujarat	Lalitbhai Mehta	BJP	
Gujarat	Savitaben V Sharda	BJP	
West Bengal	Abani Roy	RSP	
West Bengal	Chandrakala Pandey	CPM	
West Bengal	Chittabrata_Majumdar	CPM	
West Bengal	Jibon Bihari Roy	CPM	
West Bengal	Sarla Maheshwari	CPM	
West Bengal	Shankar Roy Chowdhury	IND.	

== Bye-elections ==
The following bye elections were held in the year 1999.

State - Member - Party

- Bye-elections were held on 30.08.1999 for vacancy from Assam due to death of seating member Parag Chaliha on 22 June 1999 with term ending on 14 June 2001 Joyasree Goswami Mahanta of AGP became the member on 24/08/1999.
