= 2023 Rajya Sabha elections =

Elections for the upper house of Indian Parliament

- July – September 2023

12 (Note: Including 2 casual vacancies) of the 233 (Note: excluding 12 nominated seats) elected seats in the Rajya Sabha 120 (Note: out of 239 (excluding 6 vacancies and including 12 nominated seats)) total seats needed for a majority
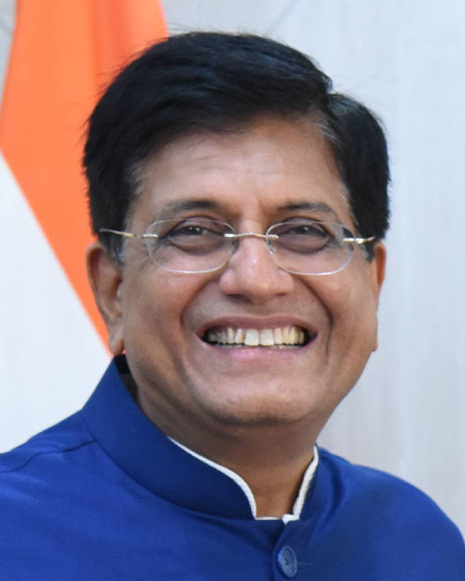

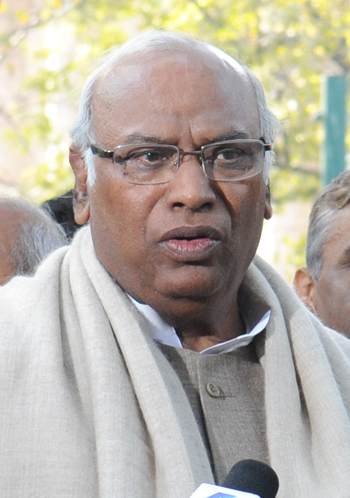
	First party	Second party
Leader	Piyush Goyal	Mallikarjun Kharge
Party	BJP	INC
Alliance	NDA	INDIA
Leader since	14 July 2021	16 February 2021
Seats before	87 (Note: excluding 5 nominated members)	31
Seats after	89 (Note: excluding 5 nominated members)	30
Seat change	▲2	▼1
Alliance seats before	100 (Note: excluding 10 nominated members)	96
Alliance seats after	102 (Note: excluding 10 nominated members)	96
Seat change	▲2	Steady
Majority before election
None
Majority after
election
None

The 2023 Rajya Sabha elections were held as part of a routine six-year cycle of the upper house of the Parliament of India on July and August 2023 to elect 10 of its 245 members, of which the states through their legislators elect 233, and the remaining 12 are appointed by the President.

== Results ==
Alliance/ Party		Seats	+/–			
Alliance/ Party			NDA	Bharatiya Janata Party	6	+2
INDIA	All India Trinamool Congress	6	+1			
INDIA	Indian National Congress	0	-1			
INDIA	Total	6	0			

== Elections ==
- Listed According To The Dates^{[1]}

State	Members retiring	Date of retirement
Goa	1	28 July 2023
Gujarat	3	18 August 2023
West Bengal	6	18 August 2023

== Members retiring and elected ==
=== Goa ===
#	Previous MP	Party	Term end	Elected MP	Party	Term start
1	Vinay Tendulkar	BJP	28-Jul-2023	Sadanand Tanavade	BJP	29-Jul-2023

=== Gujarat ===
#	Previous MP	Party	Term end	Elected MP	Party	Term start
1	S. Jaishankar	BJP	18-Aug-2023	S. Jaishankar	BJP	19-Aug-2023
2	Jugalji Thakor	BJP	18-Aug-2023	Kesridevsinh Jhala	BJP	19-Aug-2023
3	Dineshchandra Anavadiya	BJP	18-Aug-2023	Babubhai Desai	BJP	19-Aug-2023

=== West Bengal ===
#	Previous MP	Party	Term end	Elected MP	Party	Term start
1	Derek O'Brien	AITC	18-Aug-2023	Derek O'Brien	AITC	19-Aug-2023
2	Sukhendu Sekhar Roy	AITC	18-Aug-2023	Sukhendu Sekhar Roy	AITC	19-Aug-2023
3	Dola Sen	AITC	18-Aug-2023	Dola Sen	AITC	19-Aug-2023
4	Sushmita Dev	AITC	18-Aug-2023	Samirul Islam	AITC	19-Aug-2023
5	Shanta Chhetri	AITC	18-Aug-2023	Prakash Chik Baraik	AITC	19-Aug-2023
6	Pradip Bhattacharya	INC	18-Aug-2023	Anant Maharaj	BJP	19-Aug-2023

== By-elections ==
=== West Bengal ===
#	Previous MP	Party	Date of vacancy	Elected MP	Party	Date of appointment	Date of retirement
1	Luizinho Faleiro	AITC	11 April 2023	Saket Gokhale	AITC	30 July 2023	2 April 2026

=== Uttar Pradesh ===
#	Previous MP	Party	Date of vacancy	Elected MP	Party	Date of appointment	Date of retirement
1	Hardwar Dubey	BJP	26 June 2023	Dinesh Sharma	BJP	9 September 2023	25-Nov-2026

== See also ==
- 2023 elections in India
- List of current members of the Rajya Sabha
