= 1993 Rajya Sabha elections =

Elections for the Upper House of Indian Parliament

Rajya Sabha elections were held on various dates in 1993, to elect members of the Rajya Sabha, Indian Parliament's upper chamber.1 member from Goa, 3 members from Gujarat and 6 members from West Bengal are elected.

== Elections ==
Elections were held to elect members from various states.

=== Members elected ===
The following members are elected in the elections held in 1993. They are members for the term 1993-1999 and retire in year 1999, except in case of the resignation or death before the term. The list is incomplete.

State - Member - Party

Rajya Sabha members for term 1993-1999
State	Member Name	Party	Remark
Goa	John Fermin Fernandes	INC	R
Gujarat	Ahmed Patel	INC	
Gujarat	Urmilaben Chimanbhai Patel	INC	
Gujarat	Chimanbhai Haribhai Shukla	BJP	
Nominated	Dr M Aram	NOM	dea 24/05/1997
Nominated	Vyjayantimala Bali	NOM	dea 24/05/1997
Nominated	Dr B B Dutta	NOM	
Nominated	Maulana H R Nomani	NOM	
West Bengal	Abani Roy	RSP	ele 24/03/1998
West Bengal	Tridib Chaudhuri	RSP	Dea 21/12/1997
West Bengal	Chandrakala Pandey	CPM	
West Bengal	Ashok Mitra	CPM	
West Bengal	Jibon Bihari Roy	CPM	
West Bengal	Pranab Mukherjee	INC	
West Bengal	Ramnarayan Goswami	CPM	

== Bye-elections ==
The following bye elections were held in the year 1993.

State - Member - Party

1. BH - Braham Deo Anand Paswan - JD ( ele 01/06/1993 term till 1994 )
2. HR - Dinesh Singh - INC ( ele 06/07/1993 term till 1998 ) dea 30/11/1995
3. MH - Govindrao Adik - INC ( ele 03/08/1993 term till 1994 )
