= Mriganka =

Mriganka is an Indian given name. Notable people with the name include:

- Mriganka Sur (born 1953), Indian neuroscientist
- Mriganka Mohan Sur (1889–after 1972), Indian politician
- Mriganka Mahato (born 1963), Indian politician
