= Nadimul Haque =

Indian politician, journalist, and writer

Md. Nadimul Haque

Member of Parliament, Rajya Sabha
- Incumbent
- Assumed office 3 April 2012
- Constituency: West Bengal

Personal details
- Born: 20 September 1969 (age 57)
- Party: Trinamool Congress (until 2026); Mamata All India Trinamool Congress (from 2026)
- Education: Calcutta University (BA)
- Profession: Politician; Businessman

Nadimul Haque (born 20 September 1969) is a Member of Parliament representing Mamata All India Trinamool Congress in the Rajya Sabha from West Bengal. He is Journalist and Writer by profession.

== Early life ==
He did his schooling from Saifee Golden Jubilee English Public School (Saifee Hall) in Kolkata.

He earned the Bachelor of Arts with honors in Political Science at St. Xavier's College, Kolkata under Calcutta University.

== Career ==
He was nominated in the year May 2012 to Rajya Sabha from West Bengal.

Earlier during October 2009 to March 2012 he was Member of the Rajyasabha Committee of Ministry of Railways and during April 2010 to March 2012 he was Member of the Passenger Services Committee of Ministry of Railways. From May 2011 onward he became Members of various establishments of Government of West Bengal viz Press Accreditation Committee, West Bengal Minority Development & Finance Corporation, Governing Body of Urdu Academy, Mohammedan Burial Board of Kolkata Municipal Corporation, Citizens Committee of Kolkata Police and Nazrul Academy.

From May 2012 onward he is Member of Committee on Urban Development, of Indian Parliament.

== Rajya Sabha Elections ==
Position	Party	Constituency	From	To	Tenure
Member of Parliament, Rajya Sabha (1st Term)	AITC	West Bengal	3 April 2012	2 April 2018	14 years, 227 days
Member of Parliament, Rajya Sabha (2nd Term)	AITC	West Bengal	3 April 2018	2 April 2024	14 years, 227 days
Member of Parliament, Rajya Sabha (3rd Term)	AITC	West Bengal	3 April 2024	2 April 2030	14 years, 227 days
