= Barun Mukherji =

Barun Mukherji may refer to:

- Barun Mukherji (politician) (born 1933), Indian politician
- Barun Mukherji (cinematographer), Indian cinematographer
