= Kolkata Dakshin Lok Sabha constituency =

Lok Sabha Constituency in West Bengal, India

Coordinates: 22°34′22″N 88°21′50″E

Kolkata Dakshin WB-23
- Lok Sabha constituency
- Interactive Map Outlining Kolkata Dakshin Lok Sabha Constituency

Constituency details
- Country: India
- Region: East India
- State: West Bengal
- Assembly constituencies: Kasba; Behala Purba; Behala Paschim; Kolkata Port; Bhabanipur; Rashbehari; Ballygunge
- Established: 1967–Present
- Total electors: 1,719,821
- Reservation: None

Member of Parliament
- 18th Lok Sabha
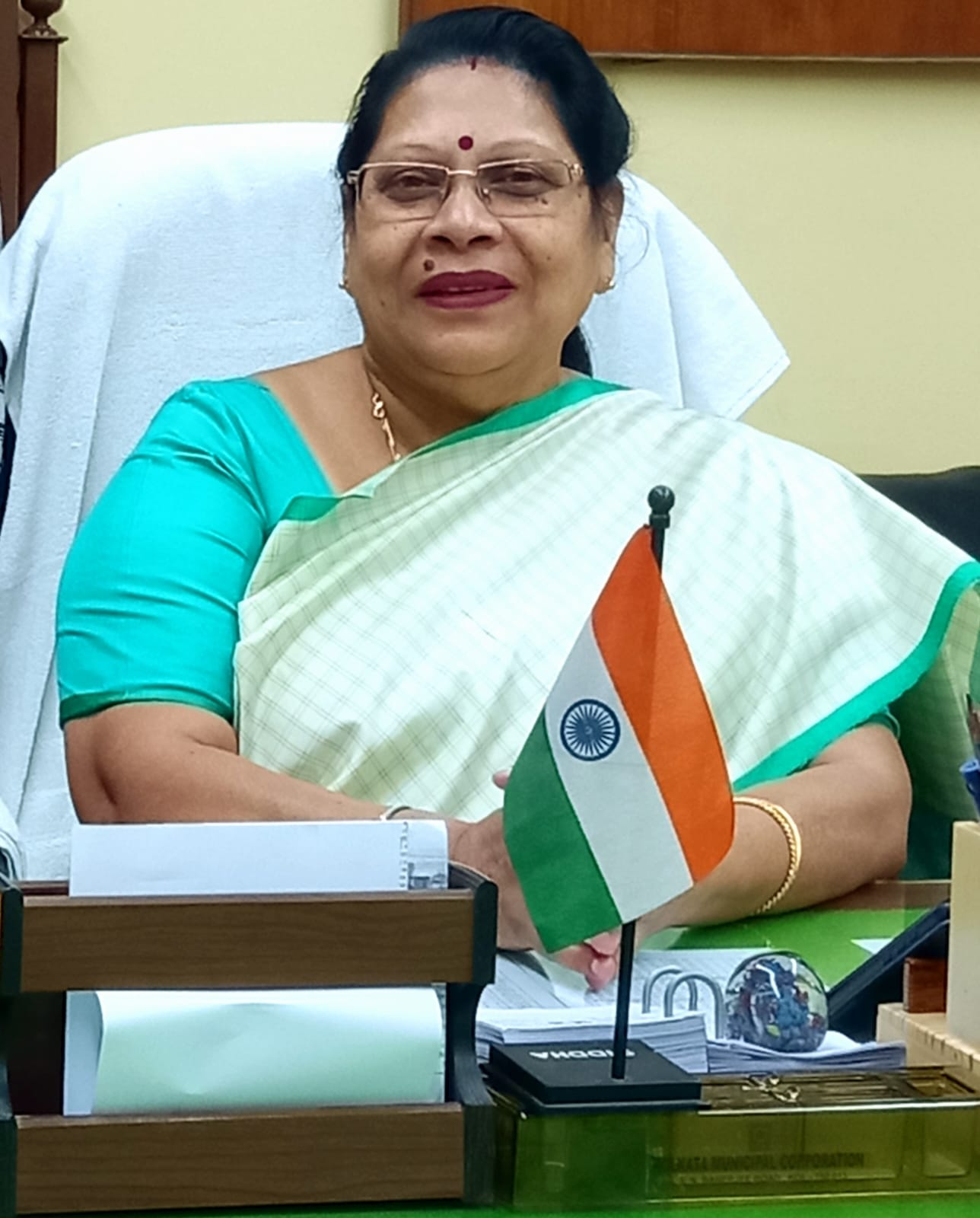
- Incumbent Mala Roy
- Party: NCPI
- Alliance: NDA
- Elected year: 2024

Kolkata Dakshin Lok Sabha constituency (earlier known as Calcutta South Lok Sabha constituency) is one of the 543 Lok Sabha (parliamentary) constituencies in India. The constituency centres on the southern part of Kolkata in West Bengal. While four of the seven legislative assembly segments on No. 23 Kolkata Dakshin Lok Sabha constituency are in Kolkata district, three are in South 24 Parganas district.

Considered to be a bastion of the Trinamool Congress, it has been won by the party since its formation in 1998. Prior to it, the seat was a stronghold of Indian National Congress. TMC's founder and former chief minister of West Bengal, Mamata Banerjee was the longest holder of the seat.

On 5 June 2026, MP Mala Roy switched her political party from Trinamool Congress to Nationalist Citizens Party of India (NCPI), which led to the end of the 28- year rule (for the first 17 years, it was known as Calcutta South) of the Trinamool Congress.

== Assembly segments ==
Parliamentary constituencies in West Bengal – 1. Cooch Behar, 2. Alipurduars, 3. Jalpaiguri, 4. Darjeeling, 5. Raiganj, 6. Balurghat, 7. Maldaha Uttar, 8. Maldaha Dakshin, 9. Jangipur, 10. Baharampur, 11. Murshidabad, 12. Krishnanagar, 13. Ranaghat, 14. Bangaon, 15. Barrackpore, 16. Dum Dum, 17. Barasat, 18. Basirhat, 19. Jaynagar, 20. Mathurapur, 21. Diamond Harbour, 22. Jadavpur, 23. Kolkata Dakshin, 24. Kolkata Uttar, 25. Howrah, 26. Uluberia, 27. Serampore, 28. Hoghly, 29. Arambagh, 30. Tamluk, 31. Kanthi, 32. Ghatal, 33. Jhargram, 34. Medinipur, 35. Purulia, 36. Bankura, 37. Bishnupur, 38. Bardhaman Purba, 39. Bardhaman Durgapur, 40. Asansol, 41. Bolpur, 42. Birbhum

As per order of the Delimitation Commission in respect of the Delimitation of constituencies in the West Bengal, Kolkata Dakshin Lok Sabha constituency is composed of the following legislative assembly segments from 2009:

#	Name	District	MLA	Party	2024 Lead
149	Kasba	South 24 Parganas	Javed Ahmed Khan	DTC	AITC
153	Behala Purba	South 24 Parganas	Shankar Sikder	BJP	AITC
154	Behala Paschim	South 24 Parganas	Indranil Khan	BJP	AITC
158	Kolkata Port	Kolkata	Firhad Hakim	DTC	AITC
159	Bhabanipur	Kolkata	Suvendu Adhikari	BJP	AITC
160	Rashbehari	Kolkata	Swapan Dasgupta	BJP	AITC
161	Ballygunge	Kolkata	Sovandeb Chattopadhyay	MAITC	AITC

== Members of Parliament ==
=== Calcutta South (1967 - 2009) ===
The constituency was named Calcutta South and remained for 42 years.

Year	Member	Party
1967	Ganesh Ghosh	Communist Party of India (Marxist)
1971	Priya Ranjan Dasmunsi	Indian National Congress
1977	Dilip Chakravarty	Janata Party
1980	Satya Sadhan Chakrabarty	Communist Party of India (Marxist)
1984	Bholanath Sen	Indian National Congress
1989	Biplab Dasgupta	Communist Party of India (Marxist)
1991	Mamata Banerjee	Indian National Congress
1996	Mamata Banerjee	Indian National Congress
1998	Mamata Banerjee	Trinamool Congress
1999	Mamata Banerjee	Trinamool Congress
2004	Mamata Banerjee	Trinamool Congress

^By-Poll

=== Kolkata Dakshin (since 2009) ===
The constituency was renamed Kolkata Dakshin and is staying for over 17 years, 142 days

MPs of Kolkata Dakshin Lok Sabha Constituency
#	Portrait	Name	From	To	Tenure	Political Party	Election
1		Mamata Banerjee	22 May 2009	4 September 2011 (Note: Resigned)	2 years, 105 days	Trinamool Congress	2009
2		Subrata Bakshi	4 September 2011	30 May 2019	7 years, 268 days	Trinamool Congress	2009
2		Subrata Bakshi	4 September 2011	30 May 2019	7 years, 268 days	Trinamool Congress	2014
3		Mala Roy	30 May 2019	Incumbent	7 years, 134 days	Trinamool Congress	2019
3		Mala Roy	30 May 2019	Incumbent	7 years, 134 days	Trinamool Congress	2024
3		Mala Roy	30 May 2019	Incumbent	7 years, 134 days	Nationalist Citizens Party of India	2026 (Note: Switched to NCPI as part of AITC Rebels in Lok Sabha.)

== Election results ==
Vote share of Winning candidates
2024	49.48%
2019	47.48%
2014	36.95%
2011 (By-Poll)	62.70%
2009	57.19%
2004	50.93%
1999	58.26%
1998	59.37%
1996	52.51%
1991	52.46%
1989	50.07%
1984	56.93%
1980	46.09%
1977	58.08%
1971	50.65%
1967	50.28%

=== 2024 ===
2024 Indian general election: Kolkata Dakshin
Party	Candidate	Votes	%	±%
AITC	Mala Roy	615,274	49.48	▲2.00
BJP	Debasree Chaudhuri	428,043	34.42	▼0.20
CPI(M)	Saira Shah Halim	168,531	13.55	▲1.93
NOTA	None of the Above	6,423	0.52	▼0.71
IND	9 Independent Candidates	15,209	1.22	
OTH	5 Other Party Candidates	9,997	0.80	
Majority		187,231	15.06	▲2.20
Turnout		1,243,477	67.21	▼2.58
AITC hold		Swing		

=== 2019 ===
2019 Indian general election: Kolkata Dakshin
Party	Candidate	Votes	%	±%
AITC	Mala Roy	573,119	47.48	▲10.53
BJP	Chandra Kumar Bose	417,927	34.62	▲9.34
CPI(M)	Nandini Mukherjee	140,275	11.62	▼12.21
INC	Mita Chakraborty	42,618	3.53	▼6.18
NOTA	None of the Above	14,824	1.23	▼0.44
BSP	Sarfaraz Khan	2,360	0.20	▼0.19
SUCI(C)	Debabrata Bera	2,391	0.20	▼0.14
SS	Sridhar Chandra Bagari	1,697	0.14	
IND	Santanu Roy	4,564	0.38	
IND	Rita Dutta	2,457	0.20	
IND	Niraj Agarwal	1,658	0.14	
IND	Kashinath Das	1,253	0.10	
IND	Badal Mondal	801	0.07	
IND	Gautam Mitra	701	0.06	
Majority		155,192	12.86	▲1.19
Turnout		1,206,645	69.79	▲0.49
AITC hold		Swing		

=== 2014 ===
2014 Indian general election: Kolkata Dakshin
Party	Candidate	Votes	%	±%
AITC	Subrata Bakshi	431,715	36.95	▼25.75
BJP	Tathagata Roy	295,376	25.28	
CPI(M)	Nandini Mukherjee	278,414	23.83	▼10.95
INC	Mala Roy	113,453	9.71	
NOTA	None of the Above	19,511	1.67	
IND	Ashoke Biswas	4,335	0.37	
SUCI(C)	Zubair Rabbani	3,994	0.34	
IUML	K. P. Md. Sharif	3,776	0.32	
IND	Shamali Das	3,356	0.29	
AMB	Hitangshu Banerjee	2,921	0.25	
BSP	Omprakash Prajapati	4,564	0.39	
IND	Badri Mondal	1,844	0.16	
WPOI	Md. Heshamuddin	1,554	0.13	
AIMF	Syed Md. Wasim Raza	1,195	0.10	
IJP	Karan Singh	1,103	0.09	
CPIM	T. P. Raveendran	875	0.07	
Majority		136,339	11.67	▼16.25
Turnout		1,167,986	69.30	▲16.48
AITC hold		Swing		

=== 2011 by-election ===
A bye election was held in this constituency in 2011 which was necessitated by the resignation of sitting MP Mamata Banerjee and her subsequent election to the State Assembly from the Bhabanipur Assembly constituency. In the by-election, Subrata Bakshi of Trinamool Congress defeated his nearest rival Ritabrata Banerjee of CPI(M) by 2,30,099 votes.

Bye-election, 2011: Kolkata Dakshin
Party	Candidate	Votes	%	±%
AITC	Subrata Bakshi	516,761	62.70	+5.51
CPI(M)	Ritabrata Banerjee	2,86,662	34.78	−0.61
IND	S. K. Biswas	8,068	0.98	+0.98
IND	Debashish Ghosh	7,049	0.86	+0.86
IND	Ranjit Kumar Dutta	5,596	0.68	+0.68
Majority		2,30,099	27.92	+6.12
Turnout		8,24,231	52.82	−14.07
AITC hold		Swing	+5.51	

=== 2009 ===
2009 Indian general election: Kolkata Dakshin
Party	Candidate	Votes	%	±%
AITC	Mamata Banerjee	576,045	57.19	▲6.26
CPI(M)	Rabin Deb	356,474	35.39	▼2.80
BJP	Jyotsna Banerjee	39,744	3.95	
BSP	Paresh Chandra Roy	6,745	0.67	▲0.10
IUML	Asif Md.	5,896	0.59	
IND	Yusuf Jamal Siddique	6,042	0.60	
IND	Ram Chandra Prasad	4,091	0.41	
IND	Nishat Khan	2,923	0.29	
IND	Barnali Mukhopadhyay	2,623	0.26	
IND	Arun Biswas	1,984	0.20	
IJP	Leela Hans	1,472	0.15	
IND	Jayanta Datta	1,512	0.15	
IND	Pijush Banerjee	1,674	0.17	
Majority		219,571	21.80	▲9.06
Turnout		1,007,225	66.90	▼3.40
AITC hold		Swing		

=== 2004 ===
2004 Indian general election: Calcutta South
Party	Candidate	Votes	%	±%
AITC	Mamata Banerjee	393,561	50.93	▼7.33
CPI(M)	Rabin Deb	295,132	38.19	▲6.51
INC	Nafisa Ali	60,377	7.81	▲1.38
IND	Sujit Kumar Roy	4,782	0.62	
BSP	Kusha Ram	4,431	0.57	▼0.19
IND	Bandana Das	4,130	0.53	
IND	Mukul Paul	2,524	0.33	
IND	Ranjit Banerjee	2,306	0.30	
IND	Barnali Mukherjee	2,258	0.29	
IND	Santu Mukherjee	1,708	0.22	
IND	Bhusan Mondal	1,533	0.20	
Majority		98,429	12.74	▼13.84
Turnout		770,828	70.30	▲3.34
AITC hold		Swing		

=== 1999 ===
1999 Indian general election: Calcutta South
Party	Candidate	Votes	%	±%
AITC	Mamata Banerjee	469,103	58.26	▼1.11
CPI(M)	Subhankar Chakraborty	255,095	31.68	▼1.27
INC	Partha Roy Chowdhury	51,735	6.43	▼0.26
CPI(ML)L	Dr. Partha Sarathi Ghosh	6,186	0.77	
BSP	Md. Shahabuddin	6,091	0.76	
IND	Ranjan Kumar Das	5,841	0.73	
IND	Murari Mohon Ghosh	4,512	0.56	
IND	Priya Nath Banerjee	2,740	0.34	
IND	Kabita Mukherjee	2,160	0.27	
IND	Bandana Biswas	1,658	0.21	
Majority		214,008	26.58	▲0.16
Turnout		805,268	66.96	▼7.48
AITC hold		Swing		

=== 1998 ===
1998 Indian general election: Calcutta South
Party	Candidate	Votes	%	±%
AITC	Mamata Banerjee	503,551	59.37	
CPI(M)	Prasanta Sur	279,470	32.95	▼7.19
INC	Sougata Ray	56,725	6.69	▼45.82
IND	Partha Sarathi Ghosh	1,937	0.23	
RJD	Salik Ram Shaw	1,498	0.18	
IND	G. Joseph	1,497	0.18	
IND	Rina Sutradhar	1,447	0.17	
IND	Adrish Bhattacharya	1,236	0.15	
IND	Addy Samir Kumar	493	0.06	
IND	Paresh Nath Banerjee	340	0.04	
Majority		224,081	26.42	▲14.05
Turnout		877,430	74.44	▲1.42
AITC gain from INC		Swing		

=== 1996 ===
1996 Indian general election: Calcutta South
Party	Candidate	Votes	%	±%
INC	Mamata Banerjee	438,252	52.51	▲0.05
CPI(M)	Bharati Mukherjee	334,991	40.14	▲1.04
BJP	Santi Roy	45,066	5.40	▼1.81
IND	Bulu Chatterjee	3,439	0.41	
IND	Sushil Chandra Majumdar	1,869	0.22	
IND	D. Guha	1,755	0.21	
IND	Tripti Das	1,589	0.19	
IND	Bandana Biswas	1,572	0.19	
AIIC(T)	Yasmeen Sen Gupta	1,527	0.18	
IND	Lalita Seth	1,482	0.18	
IND	Ramagardi Yadav	1,285	0.15	
IND	Bablu Dutta	958	0.11	
IND	Murari Mohan Ghosh	798	0.10	
Majority		103,261	12.37	▼0.99
Turnout		852,458	73.02	▲4.52
INC hold		Swing		

=== 1991 ===
1991 Indian general election: Calcutta South
Party	Candidate	Votes	%	±%
INC	Mamata Banerjee	367,896	52.46	▲5.85
CPI(M)	Biplab Das Gupta	274,233	39.10	▼10.97
BJP	Somraj Dutta	50,541	7.21	▲4.67
IND	Ashok Kr. Roy Chowdhury	1,958	0.28	
IND	Sushil Chandra Majumder	1,779	0.25	
BSP	Parimal Kanti Ray	1,121	0.16	
IND	Priti Mazumder	877	0.13	
IND	Bandana Biswas	837	0.12	
DDP	Hari Shankar Sah	792	0.11	
IND	Rajranchhor Chand Bhandari	548	0.08	
HSS	Bhagwan Das Nathany	413	0.06	
IND	Arun Ghosh	295	0.04	
Majority		93,663	13.36	▲9.90
Turnout		714,395	68.50	▼4.52
INC gain from CPI(M)		Swing		

=== 1989 ===
1989 Indian general election: Calcutta South
Party	Candidate	Votes	%	±%
CPI(M)	Biplab Dasgupta	363,674	50.07	▲8.73
INC	Bholanath Sen	338,518	46.61	▼10.32
BJP	Jnanendra Banerjee	18,418	2.54	
IND	Banerjee Sankar Som	2,213	0.30	
IND	Sourendra Nath Mitra	1,459	0.20	
IND	Arun Ghosh	1,065	0.15	
IND	Utpal Roy	996	0.14	
Majority		25,156	3.46	▼12.13
Turnout		740,076	73.02	▲0.50
CPI(M) gain from INC		Swing		

=== 1984 ===
1984 Indian general election: Calcutta South
Party	Candidate	Votes	%	±%
INC	Bhola Nath Sen	324,823	56.93	▲18.84
CPI(M)	Satyasadhan Chakraborty	235,884	41.34	▼4.75
IND	Mridula Mukherjee	2,544	0.45	
IND	Sk. Sultan	2,543	0.45	
IND	Dinesh Gupta	1,274	0.22	
IND	M. K. Ratnam	1,097	0.19	
IND	Chandan Banick	872	0.15	
IND	Shyam Sunder Thakur	789	0.14	
IND	Souren Mitra	740	0.13	
Majority		88,939	15.59	▲7.59
Turnout		582,369	72.52	▲10.98
INC gain from CPI(M)		Swing		

=== 1980 ===
1980 Indian general election: Calcutta South
Party	Candidate	Votes	%	±%
CPI(M)	Satya Sadhan Chakrabarty	213,441	46.09	
INC(I)	Bholanath Sen	176,432	38.09	▼2.50
JP	Dilip Chakrabarty	32,747	7.07	▼51.01
INC(U)	Priya Ranjan Dasmunsi	28,531	6.16	
SUCI	Subir Basu Roy	5,001	1.08	
IND	Anil Kumar Banerjee	2,102	0.45	
IND	Subrata Chatterjee	1,462	0.32	
IND	Sunil Prasad Roy	1,425	0.31	
IND	Shakya Sen	1,053	0.23	
IND	Karuna Nidhan Roy	495	0.11	
IND	Rabi Chowdhury	456	0.10	
Majority		37,009	8.00	▼9.49
Turnout		472,722	61.54	▲0.62
CPI(M) gain from JP		Swing		

=== 1977 ===
1977 Indian general election: Calcutta South
Party	Candidate	Votes	%	±%
JP	Dilip Chakravarty	225,556	58.08	
INC	Priya Ranjan Dasmunsi	157,616	40.59	▼10.06
IND	Pinaki Ranjan Chatterjee	5,182	1.33	
Majority		67,940	17.49	▲9.79
Turnout		398,561	60.92	▲1.92
JP gain from INC		Swing		

=== 1971 ===
1971 Indian general election: Calcutta South
Party	Candidate	Votes	%	±%
INC	Priya Ranjan Dasmunsi	144,952	50.65	▲13.07
CPI(M)	Ganesh Ghosh	122,913	42.95	▼7.33
INC(O)	Gobind Lal Banerjee	9,971	3.48	
SUCI	Ashutosh Banerjee	8,333	2.91	
Majority		22,039	7.70	▼5.00
Turnout		296,088	59.00	▼3.60
INC gain from CPI(M)		Swing		

=== 1967 ===
1967 Indian general election: Calcutta South
Party	Candidate	Votes	%	±%
CPI(M)	Ganesh Ghosh	155,574	50.28	
INC	B. B. Ghosh	116,287	37.58	
IND	M. Sen	24,613	7.95	
IND	D. Biswanath	12,954	4.19	
Majority		39,287	12.70	
Turnout		317,171	62.60	
CPI(M) win (new seat)				

== See also ==
- Kolkata
- List of constituencies of the Lok Sabha
