= Suryakant Acharya =

Indian politician

Member of Parliament Rajya Sabha
- In office 19 August 2005 – 21 December 2009
- Preceded by: Lalitbhai Mehta
- Succeeded by: Pravin Naik
- Constituency: Gujarat

Vice Chairman of State Planning Commission of Gujarat
- In office June 1998 – January 2003

Personal details
- Born: Suryakant Acharya; 12 December 1929 Junagadh, Junagadh State, British India
- Died: 21 December 2009 (aged 80) Junagadh, Gujarat, India
- Party: Bharatiya Janata Party (1980-2009)
- Other political affiliations: Bharatiya Jana Sangh (1957-1977); Janata Party (1977-1980)
- Spouse: Hemaben Acharya

Suryakant Acharya (9 December 1929 – 21 December 2009) was an Indian politician of the Bharatiya Janata Party and a member of the Parliament of India representing Gujarat in the Rajya Sabha, the upper house of the Indian Parliament.

He was elected from Gujarat State in Rajya Sabha, the Council of States of India parliament for the 2005 to 2011.

He was Vice Chairman of State Planning Commission of Gujarat from June 1998 to January 2003.

He was married to Hemaben Acharya who was Minister of Health at Govt of Gujarat during 1975–80. They had one son.
