= Bhupesh Gupta =

Indian politician

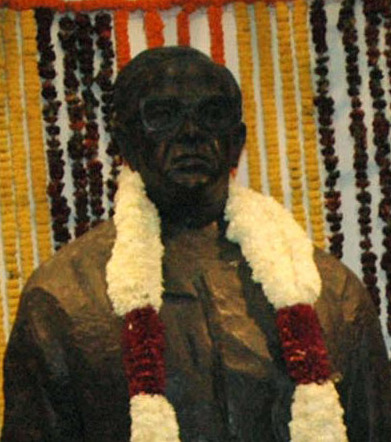

Member of Parliament, Rajya Sabha
- In office 3 April 1952 – 6 August 1981
- Preceded by: Office established
- Succeeded by: Nepaldev Bhattacharjee
- Constituency: West Bengal

Personal details
- Born: 20 October 1914 Itna, Kishoreganj District, Bengal Province, British India
- Died: 6 August 1981 (aged 66) Moscow, Russian SFSR, Soviet Union
- Party: Communist Party of India
- Parent: Mahesh Chandra Gupta (father)
- Education: Scottish Church College, University of Calcutta
- Occupation: Parliamentarian

Bhupesh Gupta (Bengali: ভূপেশ গুপ্ত) (20 October 1914 – 6 August 1981) was an Indian politician and a leader of the Communist Party of India.

He was one of the senior communist leaders and parliamentarians in Rajya Sabha. He was elected on 13 May 1952 as a Member of the Rajya Sabha and remained on the post till his death in 1981. He was the longest-serving member of the Rajya Sabha at the time of his death.

== Early life ==
He was born on 20 October 1914, at Itna, in the erstwhile Mymensingh District of Bengal Province in British India. He studied at the Scottish Church College of the University of Calcutta. Bhupesh Gupta joined the freedom movement of India in his early years when he was active in the Bengal revolutionary group Anushilan Samiti.

He did his Barrister-at-law from University College London and was called to the Bar from the Middle Temple, London. In England he was a close friend of Indira Gandhi as both they participated in the activities of the India League, though their political conviction was different in later course.

== Later life ==
He was a member of the Rajya Sabha for five terms from West Bengal, from 13 May 1952 till his death. He was reelected in 1958, 1964, 1970 and 1976. He was a skilled parliamentarian. He died in Moscow on 6 August 1981.

== Rajya Sabha Election History ==
Position	Party	Constituency	From	To	Tenure
Member of Parliament, Rajya Sabha (1st Term)	CPI	West Bengal	3 April 1952	2 April 1958	5 years, 364 days
Member of Parliament, Rajya Sabha (2nd Term)	CPI	West Bengal	3 April 1958	2 April 1964	5 years, 365 days
Member of Parliament, Rajya Sabha (3rd Term)	CPI	West Bengal	3 April 1964	2 April 1970	5 years, 364 days
Member of Parliament, Rajya Sabha (4th Term)	CPI	West Bengal	3 April 1970	2 April 1976	5 years, 365 days
Member of Parliament, Rajya Sabha (5th Term)	CPI	West Bengal	3 April 1976	6 August 1981	5 years, 125 days

== Sources ==
- Datta, Asit, ed. (2008), "Some Alumni of Scottish Church College", 175th Year Commemoration Volume, Kolkata, India: Scottish Church College, OCLC 243677369

Rajya Sabha
New office	Member of Parliament from West Bengal; 3 April 1952 – 6 August 1981	Succeeded by Nepaldev Bhattacharjee
