= Biren Roy =

Indian politician

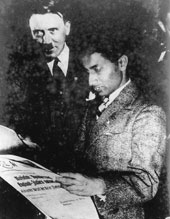
- Biren Roy with Adolf Hitler in 1936

Member of Parliament, Rajya Sabha
- In office 1960–1972
- Constituency: West Bengal

Member of Parliament, Lok Sabha
- In office 1957-1960
- Preceded by: Ashim Krishna Dutt
- Succeeded by: Indrajit Gupta
- Constituency: Calcutta South West

Personal details
- Born: 28 August 1909 Behala, Calcutta, British India
- Died: 22 January 1996 (aged 85) Calcutta, West Bengal, India
- Party: Indian National Congress
- Spouse: Meghmala Debi

Biren Roy (1909–1996) was an Indian politician. He was a Member of Parliament, representing West Bengal in the Rajya Sabha, the upper house of India's Parliament representing the Indian National Congress.
