= Biplab =

Biplab is a given name. Notable people with the name include:

- Biplab Chatterjee, Indian actor
- Biplab Dasgupta, Indian politician
- Biplab Kumar Deb, Indian politician, Chief Minister of Tripura since 2018
- Biplab Mitra, India politician
- Biplab Saikia, Indian cricketer
- Biplab Samantray, Indian cricketer
