= Tridib Chaudhuri =

Indian independence activist and politician

Comrade Tridib Kumar Chaudhuri

Member of Parliament, Rajya Sabha
- In office 1987–1997
- Succeeded by: Abani Roy
- Constituency: West Bengal

Member of Parliament, Lok Sabha
- In office 1952–1984
- Preceded by: Constituency established
- Succeeded by: Atish Chandra Sinha
- Constituency: Baharampur, West Bengal

Personal details
- Born: 13 December 1911 Dhaka, Eastern Bengal and Assam, British India (now in Dhaka Division, Bangladesh)
- Died: 21 December 1997 (aged 86) Calcutta, West Bengal, India
- Party: Revolutionary Socialist Party
- Other political affiliations: Indian National Congress; Congress Socialist Party
- Education: BA and MA
- Alma mater: Calcutta University
- As of 17 September, 2006

Tridib Kumar Chaudhuri (13 December 1911 – 21 December 1997) was an Indian independence activist and politician. He was a leader and founder of the Revolutionary Socialist Party and a member of Lok Sabha from Baharampur in West Bengal.

Chaudhuri was born to a middle-class zamindari family with roots in Haripur, Pabna District. He passed his BA examination in 1933 and subsequently MA in economics from the University of Calcutta as an external candidate from jail, when he was imprisoned for sedition against the colonial rule.

He was the joint opposition candidate for the 1974 Indian presidential election and became the first Bengali to participate in the presidential election in India. He was a member of Lok Sabha from 1952 to 1984 and Rajya Sabha from 1987 until his death in 1997. He had participated in Goa Liberation Movement. He was one of the founders of the Revolutionary Socialist Party.

== Lok Sabha experience ==
Tridib Chaudhuri was present in seven Lok Sabhas, from 1952 until 1984.

• 1st Lok Sabha

• 2nd Lok Sabha

• 3rd Lok Sabha

• 4th Lok Sabha

• 5th Lok Sabha

• 6th Lok Sabha

• 7th Lok Sabha

== 1974 Indian Presidential Election ==
On 17 August 1974, the Election Commission of India held indirect 6th presidential elections of India. Tridib Chaudhuri lost to Fakhruddin Ali Ahmed by a margin of 189,196 votes.

== Books ==
• The Swing Back: A Critical Survey of the Devious Zig-zags of CPI, Political Line (1947–50).
