= Sukhendu Sekhar Roy =

Indian politician

Member of Parliament, Rajya Sabha
- Incumbent
- Assumed office 19 August 2011
- Preceded by: Abani Roy
- Constituency: West Bengal

Editor of Jago Bangla
- In office 2022–2024
- Preceded by: Partha Chatterjee
- Succeeded by: Sovandeb Chattopadhyay

Chief Whip of All India Trinamool Congress in Rajya Sabha
- In office 2011–2024
- Leader: Derek O'Brien
- Preceded by: Position established
- Succeeded by: Nadimul Haque

Personal details
- Born: 5 April 1949 (age 77) English Bazar, Malda West Bengal, India
- Party: Bharatiya Janata Party (2026-present)
- Other political affiliations: Trinamool Congress (2011–2026); Indian National Congress (until 2011)
- Parent: Shibendu Sekhar Roy

Sukhendu Sekhar Roy (born 5 April 1949) is an Indian politician from West Bengal who is affiliated with the Bharatiya Janata Party. He was elected to the Rajya Sabha, the Upper house of Indian parliament, from West Bengal in 2011. He resigned from the Rajya Sabha on 8 June 2026 and was subsequently elected as a BJP candidate.
