= Pravin Naik =

Indian politician

Pravin Naik (born 3 January 1937) is a politician from Indian State of Gujarat. He is a part of the Bharatiya Janata Party.

He represented Gujarat State in Rajya Sabha, the Council of States of India parliament, from 2010 to 2011.

He became representative following the death of sitting member Suryakantbhai Acharya. He was Councillor in Surat Municipal Corporation.
