= Ashim Krishna Dutt =

Indian politician

Member of Parliament, Lok Sabha
- In office 1952–1957
- Constituency: Calcutta South West

Personal details
- Born: 29 December 1892
- Party: Indian National Congress
- Spouse: Shova Dutt

Ashim Krishna Dutt was an Indian politician. He was a Member of Parliament, representing Calcutta South West in the Lok Sabha, the lower house of India's Parliament representing the Indian National Congress.
