= 1974 Indian presidential election =

Election of Fakhruddin Ali Ahmed

- 17 August 1974
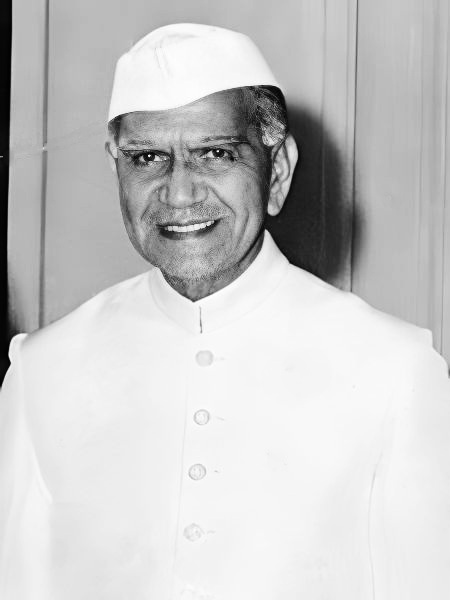
		RSP
Nominee	Fakhruddin Ali Ahmed	Tridib Chaudhuri
Party	INC(R)	RSP
Home state	Assam	West Bengal
Electoral vote	754,113	189,196
Percentage	79.94%	20.06%
President before election
Varahagiri Venkata Giri
Independent
Elected President
Fakhruddin Ali Ahmed
INC

The Election Commission of India held indirect sixth presidential elections of India on 17 August 1974. Fakhruddin Ali Ahmed, from Assam with 765,587 votes won over his nearest rival Tridib Chaudhuri, from West Bengal who got 189,196 votes.

== Electoral change ==
During the 1974 elections, there was a change in the electoral college. It now had 521 from the Lok Sabha, 230 from the Rajya Sabha and 3654 from the State assemblies.

== Schedule ==
The election schedule was announced by the Election Commission of India on 16 July 1974.

S.No.	Poll Event	Date
1.	Last Date for filing nomination	30 July 1974
2.	Date for Scrutiny of nomination	31 July 1974
3.	Last Date for Withdrawal of nomination	2 August 1974
4.	Date of Poll	17 August 1974
5.	Date of Counting	20 August 1974

== Results ==
Source: Web archive of Election Commission of India website

Candidate	Electoral Values
Fakhruddin Ali Ahmed	754,113
Tridib Chaudhuri	189,196
Total	943,309

== See also ==
- 1974 Indian vice presidential election
