= Subrata Bakshi =

Indian politician (born 1950)

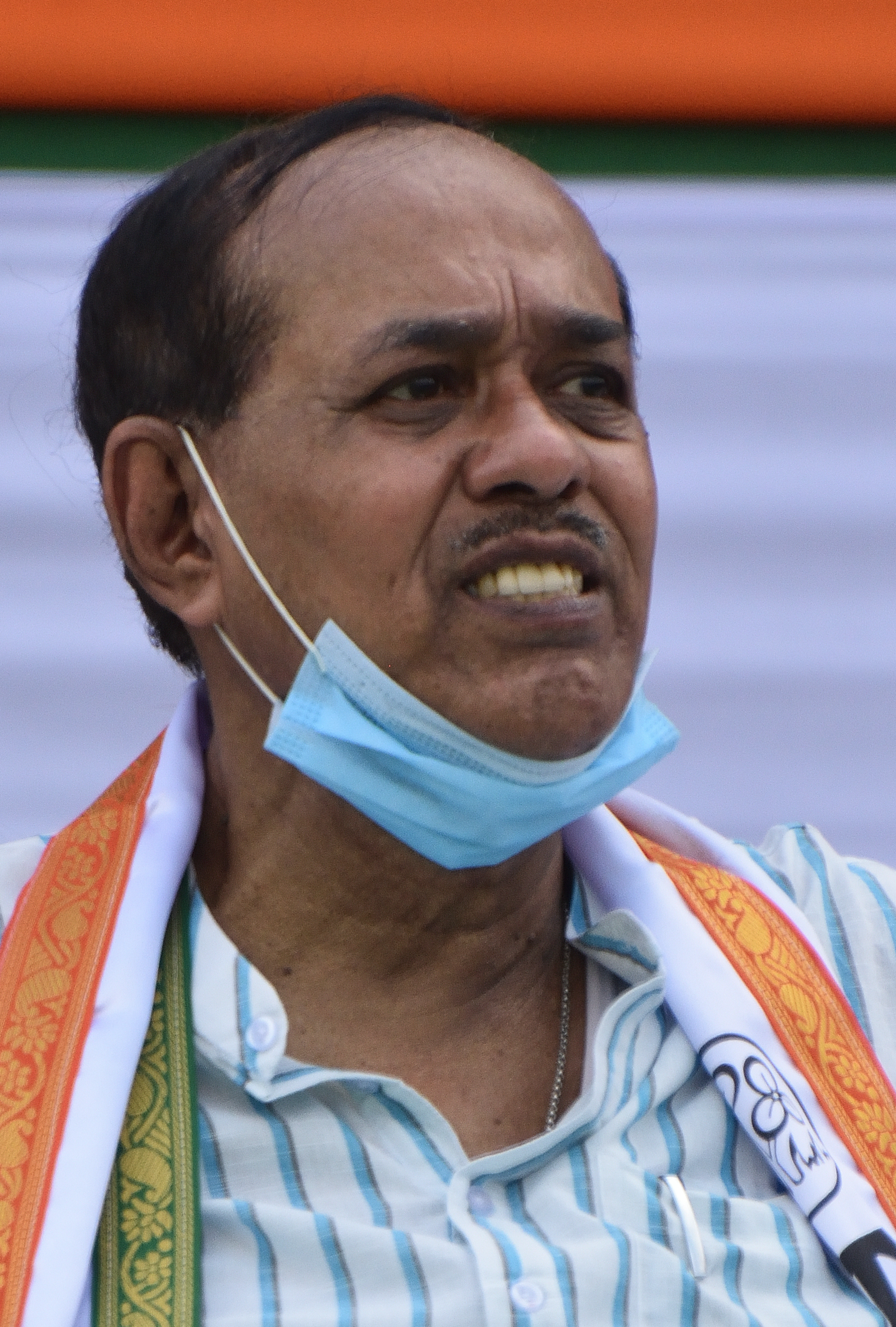
- Bakshi in March 2023

Member of Parliament, Rajya Sabha
- In office 3 April 2020 – 2 April 2026
- Preceded by: Manish Gupta
- Succeeded by: Babul Supriyo
- Constituency: West Bengal

State President of West Bengal Trinamool Congress
- In office 1 January 1998 – 5 June 2026
- Leader: Mamata Banerjee
- Preceded by: Position established
- Succeeded by: Chandrima Bhattacharya

Deputy Leader of Trinamool Congress in Rajya Sabha
- In office 3 April 2020 – 8 June 2024

Member of Parliament, Lok Sabha
- In office 4 December 2011 – 23 May 2019
- Preceded by: Mamata Banerjee
- Succeeded by: Mala Roy
- Constituency: Kolkata Dakshin
- Majority: 136,339 (11.67%)

Minister for Public Works Department, Government of West Bengal
- In office 20 May 2011 – 10 December 2011
- Chief Minister: Mamata Banerjee
- Preceded by: Kshiti Goswami
- Succeeded by: Sudarsan Ghosh Dastidar

Minister for Transport, Government of West Bengal
- In office 20 May 2011 – 10 December 2011
- Chief Minister: Mamata Banerjee
- Preceded by: Ranjit Kundu
- Succeeded by: Madan Mitra

Member of the West Bengal Legislative Assembly
- In office 13 May 2011 – 10 December 2011
- Preceded by: Constituency was named before as Kalighat
- Succeeded by: Mamata Banerjee
- Constituency: Bhabanipur
- In office 11 May 2006 – 13 May 2011
- Preceded by: Subrata Mukherjee
- Succeeded by: Sikha Mitra
- Constituency: Chowranghee
- In office 13 May 2001 – 11 May 2006
- Preceded by: Sankar Saran Sarkar
- Succeeded by: Rathin Sarkar
- Constituency: Bishnupur West

National General Secretary of All India Trinamool Congress
- In office 2015–2021
- Preceded by: Mukul Roy
- Succeeded by: Abhishek Banerjee

Personal details
- Born: 23 July 1950 (age 76) Kolkata, West Bengal, India
- Party: Trinamool Congress (1998–present)
- Other political affiliations: Indian National Congress (before 1998)
- Spouse: Sahana Bakshi (m. 1992)
- Children: 1 (Son)
- Education: Calcutta University (B.Sc., LL.B.)
- Profession: Social Worker, Politician
- As of 15 March 2021

Subrata Bakshi (born 23 July 1950) is an Indian politician who served as Member of Parliament, Rajya Sabha from West Bengal. He was the General Secretary of the Trinamool Congress and State President of West Bengal Trinamool Congress. He was the Minister for Public Works and the Minister for Transport in the Government of West Bengal from May to December 2011. He was also an MLA, elected from the Bhabanipur constituency in the 2011 West Bengal state assembly election.

He was elected to parliament from Kolkata Dakshin constituency after Mamata Banerjee resigned to become a member of the West Bengal Legislative Assembly. He was elected on 10 December 2011 with a margin of 2,30,999 votes, and re-elected in 2014.

State Legislative Assembly
Preceded by Sankar Saran Sarkar	Member of the West Bengal Legislative Assembly from Bishnupur, South 24 Parganas Assembly constituency 2001 – 2006	Succeeded by Rathin Sarkar
Preceded by Subrata Mukherjee	Member of the West Bengal Legislative Assembly from Chowrangee Assembly constituency 2006 – 2011	Succeeded by Sikha Mitra
New seat	Member of the West Bengal Legislative Assembly from Bhabanipur, West Bengal Assembly constituency 2011 –	Succeeded by Mamata Banerjee
Lok Sabha
Preceded by Mamata Banerjee	Member of Parliament for Kolkata Dakshin; 2011–2019	Succeeded by Mala Roy
Rajya Sabha
Preceded by Manish Gupta	Member of Parliament in Rajya Sabha for West Bengal; 2020 – 2026	Succeeded by Babul Supriyo
Political offices
Preceded by ?	Minister for Public Works, Government of West Bengal; 20 May 2011 – 10 December 2011	Succeeded by ?
Preceded by Ranjit Kundu	Minister for Transport, Government of West Bengal; 20 May 2011 – 10 December 2011	Succeeded by Madan Mitra
Party political offices
Preceded by Mukul Roy	General secretary All India Trinamool Congress; 1 January 1998 – present	Incumbent
