= Jawhar Sircar =

Member of Parliament, Indian Government

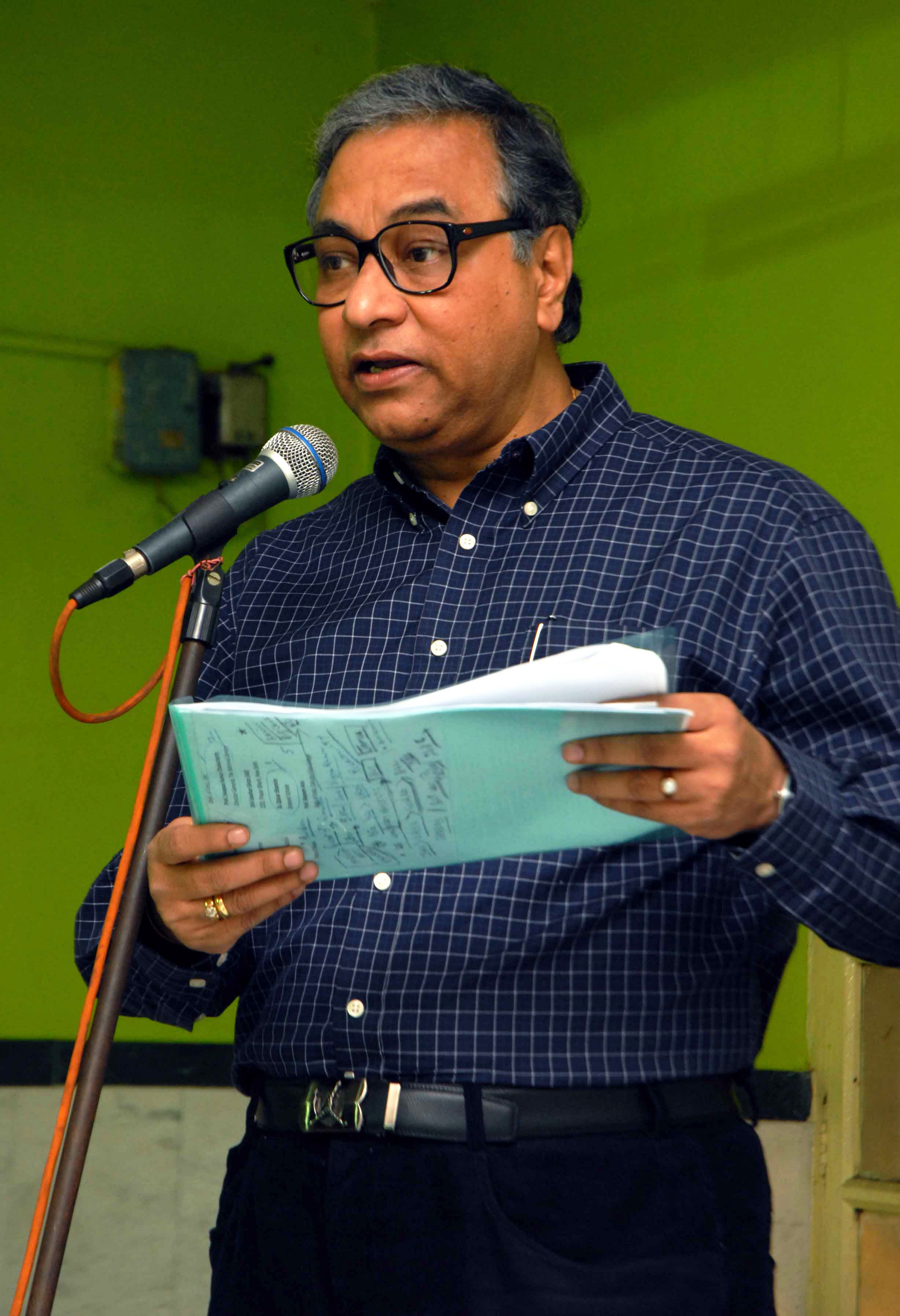
- Sircar in 2013

Member of Parliament, Rajya Sabha
- In office 4 August 2021 – 13 September 2024
- Preceded by: Dinesh Trivedi
- Succeeded by: Ritabrata Banerjee
- Constituency: West Bengal

Chief Executive Officer of Prasar Bharati
- In office 2012–2016

Personal details
- Born: 22 March 1952 (age 74) Calcutta, West Bengal, India
- Party: All India Trinamool Congress (2021–2024)
- Spouse: Nandita Sircar
- Children: 1
- Education: Calcutta University (BA, MA); University of Cambridge; University of Sussex
- Website: jawharsircar.com

Jawhar Sircar (born 22 March 1952) is an Indian former top civil servant and a public intellectual based out of Kolkata, West Bengal. He is known for resigning prematurely as Member of Parliament, Rajya Sabha, to protest against the West Bengal government's alleged repression and political corruption in September 2024. He now assists activists and advocacy groups with his experience in public affairs and administration. Many of his writings and speeches are on these issues.

Sircar has been active in research in cultural, historical and anthropological subjects for several years, even while working full-time in administration. He has published multiple articles and delivers regular talks on topics from history, culture, social responses and the media. His monograph: ‘The Construction of the Hindu Identity in Medieval Western Bengal: The Role of Popular Cults’ was well received in India and abroad. His book in his native Bengali on cultural festivals and rituals of India is widely acclaimed. India’s oldest intellectual body, the Asiatic Society awarded him for his ‘contribution to history and politics’.

In August 2021, he was elected unopposed to represent West Bengal as Member of the Upper House — the Council of States Rajya Sabha, the upper house of the Parliament of India by the AITC that is virulent in its opposition to Prime Minister Modi’s ruling party. While in Parliament, he took active part in debates and in criticising the Modi government.

== Summary ==
Jawhar Sircar was a member of the Upper House (Rajya Sabha) of the Indian Parliament who was nominated by the Trinamool Congress party and elected uncontested on 2 August 2021 to represent the State of West Bengal. He is a public intellectual based out of Kolkata. He resigned this post prematurely after three years to join a mass movement protesting the Indian government.

He previously headed India's Culture Ministry from November 2008 to February 2012, and was the longest serving secretary. Sircar supports campaigns to preserve India's cultural heritage against attempts to utilise it for sectarian gains. He has represented India in top international organisations, including the UNESCO and he speaks regularly and writes on public issues relating to the conservation of heritage.

He was chief executive officer of India's public broadcaster, Prasar Bharati from 2012 until 2016. He resigned from this post before his term ended, as he was not comfortable with the NDA government as he was appointed to the post by the UPA government. DIGIPUB News India Foundation, which represents large media organisations in India, selected him for its 'appellate committee' – as an individual with "unimpeachable public service record and accomplishments". He was on its four-member statutory national-level self-regulatory mechanism, which is chaired by former Supreme Court Justice Madan Lokur.

He was an active member of a pressure group of retired central secretaries, chief secretaries of states, director generals of police, Indian ambassadors and others, known as the 'Constitutional Conduct Group'.

He studied at the universities of Calcutta, Presidency, Cambridge and Sussex and has two master's degrees- in history and sociology. His main field work has been on social history, popular religion and the cult of Dharma Thakur in western Bengal.

He covered numerous field sites in five districts of the state of West Bengal, but could not submit his thesis, as government did not permit even a short sabbatical.

He has published numerous articles on cultural, historical and anthropological subjects for several years in books, as also in noted national and international journals and newspapers. He has also delivered several talks on the subjects of history, religion, contemporary affairs and the intersection between religion and anthropology. The Asiatic Society of Kolkata (established in 1774) has conferred its Biman Behari Memorial Award on him for his contribution to popularising the study of history and politics.

From 2017 to 2020, he has chaired the Board of Governors of the Centre for Studies in Social Sciences, Kolkata – one of India's highest rated social science research and teaching institutes. Sircar was its first non-academic chairman in its half-century history.

As an officer of India's premier Indian Administrative Service, he has served in the sectors of finance, commerce and industries for 17 years and in 'public communication', i.e., in the administration of education, culture and media for more than 12 years. He was honoured by the British Museum with its silver medal for piloting museum reforms in the country. A former president of India has publicly complimented him as an "outstanding performer and visionary", while a former prime minister described him as "one of India's most distinguished civil servants."

== Academics and publications ==
He has been active in research even while working full-time in administration. He has published multiple articles on cultural, historical and anthropological subjects for several years. He has published research papers on the subjects of history, culture, media and society.

He has also delivered talks on the subjects of history, culture and media. His monograph: The Construction of the Hindu Identity in Medieval Western Bengal: The Role of Popular Cults was well received in India and abroad.

His writings are both available in Bangla as well as English newspapers.

== Education ==
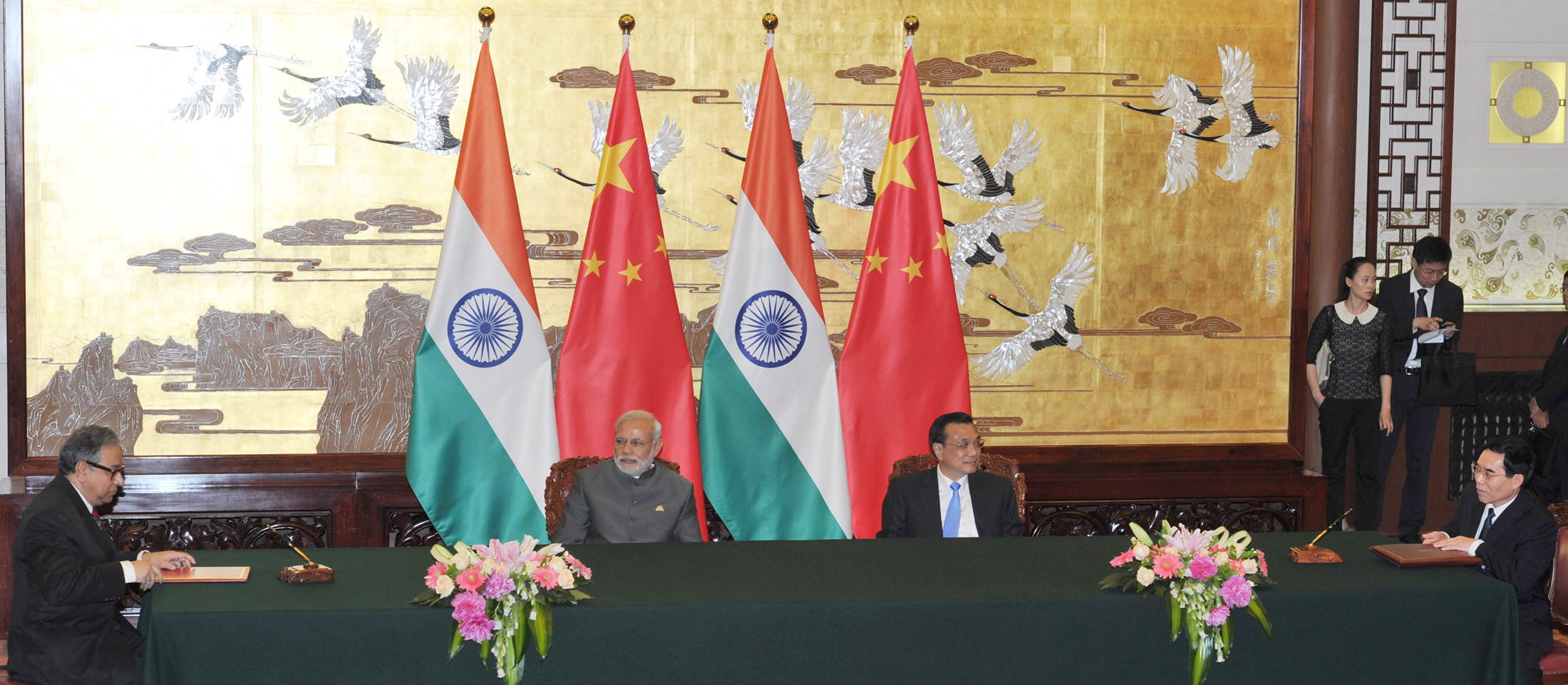
While Signing an MoU with Chinese Counterpart as Hon'ble PM Narendra Modi looks on

Jawhar Sircar studied at St. Xavier's School, Presidency College and Calcutta University - all in Kolkata. He did his master's degree in ancient Indian history and culture from Calcutta University and a second masters in sociology, with social anthropology. He graduated in political science from Presidency College, standing second in Calcutta University. He also studied at the University of Cambridge and the University of Sussex in the UK.

== Career in administration ==
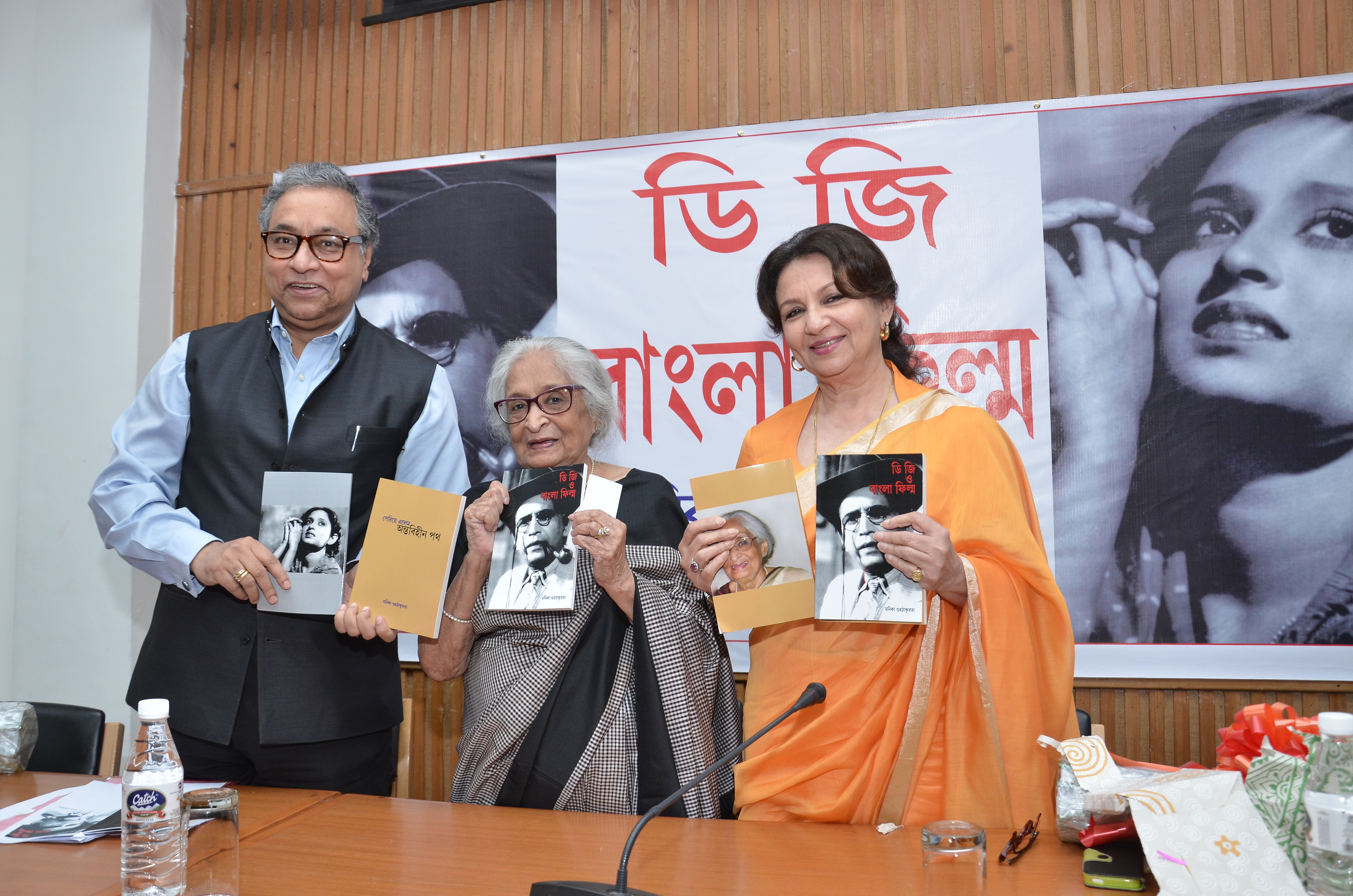
Jawhar Sircar with Veteran Actress Sharmila Tagore

After joining the Indian Administrative Service (IAS) in 1975 in West Bengal, he held several postings in the districts of Burdwan and 24 Parganas where he made a name for himself in tackling very difficult problems including communal riots. After this, he moved on to become the secretary in the Finance Department looking after Expenditure., he was appointed Sales Tax Commissioner of West Bengal where he could secure the highest rate of growth in the 1990s.

In May, 2006, Sircar was called to the Government of India in New Delhi, on promotion as Additional Secretary and Development Commissioner for Micro, Small and Medium Enterprises (MSME), a term that he helped introduce through a new Act of Parliament. He is known as the pioneer of 'Cluster Development', as well as for grass-roots financing of tiny industries, including Micro Finance and also for initiating several reforms in the sector.

In September 2008, he was elevated as Secretary to Government of India, and moved on to head the Ministry of Culture, where he served as its longest-serving Secretary till early 2012. He initiated long-pending reforms and helped fo modernise museums, archives, and libraries. He is credited with introducing many new programmes to assist cultural organizations and their expressions. Jawhar Sircar was successful in forging multiple cultural partnerships between India and other countries, and among his major credits are the Anish Kapoor exhibition from the UK and the holding of seven unique overseas exhibitions of the original paintings of Rabindra Nath Tagore which had not left India shores for more than 80 years.

He also briefly served as acting secretary for the Ministry of Information & Broadcasting, Government of India.

Sircar has worked in the fields of finance, commerce and industries for 17 of his 38 years in public service, where he has managed large corporations, including the multibillion-dollar Haldia Petrochemicals.

On the other hand, he has also worked in the field of public communication: in education, culture and media as well as related assignments, for over 11 years.

== Association ==
Jawhar Sircar was a member of the Governing Councils of Indian Council of World Affairs, Consortium for Educational Communication, Film & Television Institute of India and also Trustee/GB Member of IIM (India Institute of Management), Kolkata, Victoria Memorial Museum, Indian Museum, National Museum, National Library, National School of Drama, IGNCA, and the Three National Akademies.

He served on the National Advisory Council of Spic Macay, and was nominated on the National Executive Council of CII. He served on the Board of Governors of Media Research Users Council (MRUC), Mumbai, which does research and surveys for readership, viewership and listenership of various media for advertising. He had been on the advisory board of CEMPD, Kolkata (Centre for Environmental Management and Participatory Development). Sircar has also been a Trustee Member of PSBT (Public Service Broadcasting Trust) from 2012 to 2016.

== Other interests ==
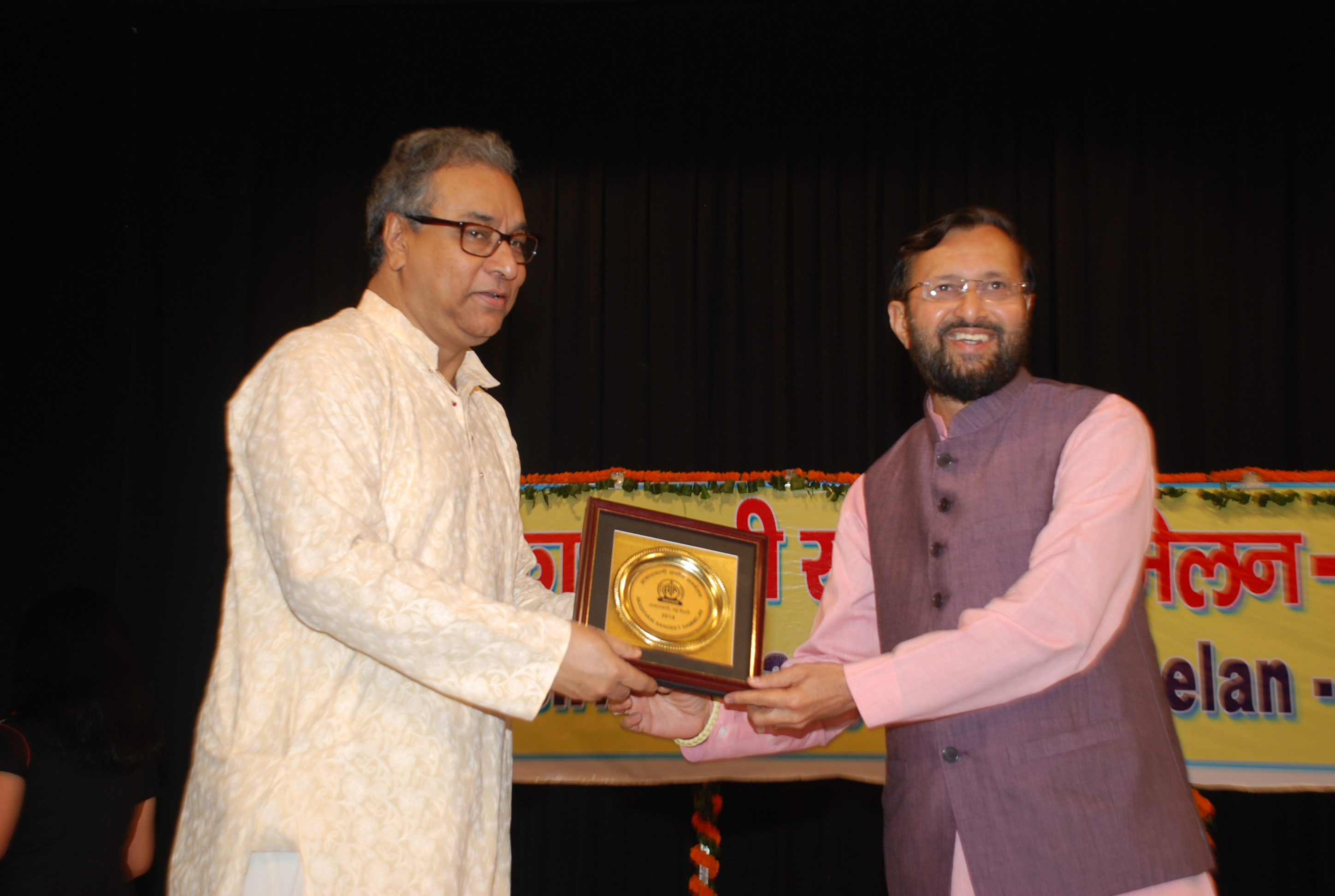
Jawhar Sircar with Prakash Javadekar

Jawhar Sircar was Vice President of the All India Tennis Association, and served as the president of India's Children's Little Theatre. Sircar has also been a trustee member of PSBT (Public Service Broadcasting Trust) from 2012 to 2016.

He is a Life Member of the 240-year-old Asiatic Society, Indian National Confederation and Academy of Anthropologists, & Cultural Heritage, Bangiya Sahitya Parishad, Indian History Congress and several other well-known institutions.

He was the moving spirit behind the Kolkata International Film Festival from 1997 to 2005, and has organized several film and media related programmes, with participation of many countries.

Sircar was instrumental in the management of world's largest book fair, in terms of attendance: the Kolkata Book Fair.

== Awards ==
- 'Pride of Bengal’ Award by the Indian Chamber of Commerce
- Biman Bihari Majumdar Award for History and Politics by Asiatic Society, Kolkata

in 2018

- Best CEO Award in 2013(Two years after joining PB)
- Maulana Jameel Ilyasi Excellency Award – August, 2013
- News Television Network CEO of the Year ENBA 2013 Award
- Corporate Broadcaster of the Year, Award by Calcutta Management Association
- In 2015 Digital Studio Broadcasting & Production Magazine had placed him among the 10 most important people in the broadcasting industry.
