= Samirul Islam =

Indian politician

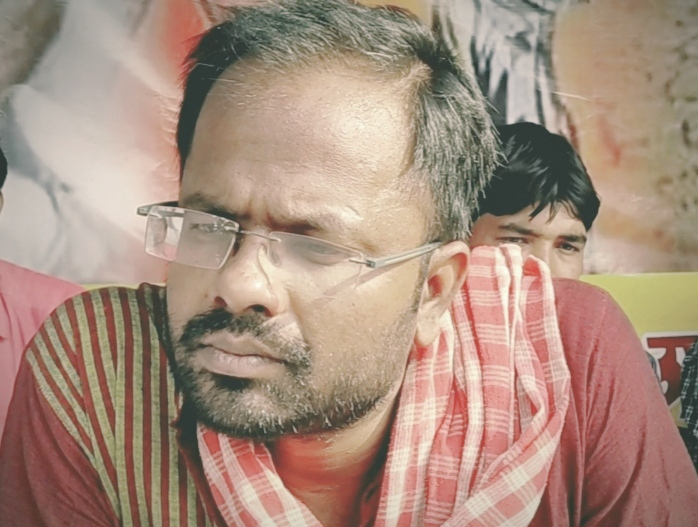

Member of Parliament, Rajya Sabha
- Incumbent
- Assumed office 03 August 2023
- Constituency: List of Rajya Sabha members from West Bengal

Ex-Chairman, Tenure 2023-2026 West Bengal Migrant Welfare Board,
- Incumbent
- Assumed office 01 August 2023
- Preceding: Position Established

Personal details
- Born: 3 April 1987 (age 39) Dunigram, Rampurhat, Birbhum District, West Bengal, India
- Party: All India Trinamool Congress (until 2026); Mamata All India Trinamool Congress (from 2026)
- Education: M.Sc (Chemistry), IIT Delhi (2011)
- Occupation: Politician, teacher

Samirul Islam (born 3 April 1987) is an Indian politician and former teacher who is serving as Member of Rajya Sabha from West Bengal since 2023, representing Mamata All India Trinamool Congress.

== Early life and education ==
He was born on 3 April 1987 at Dunigram, in Birbhum, West Bengal. He has earned M.Sc in Chemistry from IIT Delhi in 2011.

== Career ==
He worked as assistant professor in Andrews College, Kolkata.

Ahead of the 2021 Assembly elections in West Bengal, he 'bridged' the 'No Vote to BJP' slogan with other prominent leftist-intellectuals in Kolkata.

He was appointed member of Rajya Sabha in July 2023. Islam has been appointed chairman of West Bengal migrant welfare board since August 2023.
