= T. S. Gurung =

Indian politician

- Born: October 1923; Kohima, Nagaland
- Died: January 1989 (aged 65)

T. S. Gurung (1923-1989) was a social and political worker of Darjeeling, India.

== Life ==
Born in October 1923 at Kohima in Nagaland, Shri T. S. Gurung was educated in Guwahati and Shillong. He worked for the welfare of local population and was elected to the Rajya Sabha from West Bengal in 1986. He was also elected as an MLA.

He was murdered in January, 1989.
