= Sitaram Daga =

Indian politician

Member of Parliament, Rajya Sabha
- In office 1957-1958
- Preceded by: Late Dulichand Daga
- Constituency: West Bengal

Personal details
- Born: 18 December 1922 Jalpaiguri, West Bengal
- Died: 23 November 2014 (aged 91) Kolkata
- Party: Indian National Congress
- Spouse: Savitri Devi Daga

Sitaram Daga was an Indian industrialist with interests primarily in Tea Plantations and manufacturing on a large scale spread across the Indian states of West Bengal and Assam, besides other businesses. He was nominated to the Rajya Sabha representing the business community. He was a Member of Parliament, representing West Bengal in the Rajya Sabha the upper house of India's Parliament as a member of the Indian National Congress.
