= Abhishek Banerjee =

Abhishek Banerjee may refer to:

- Abhishek Banerjee (politician) (born 1987), Indian politician
- Abhishek Banerjee (actor) (born 1988), Indian actor and casting director

== See also ==
- Abhisek Banerjee (born 1984), Indian cricketer
