= Ramendra Kumar Podder =

Bengali biochemistry scholar (born 1930)

R. K. Poddar

Member of Parliament, Rajya Sabha
- In office 1985-1993
- Constituency: West Bengal

Personal details
- Born: 9 November 1930
- Party: Communist Party of India (Marxist)
- Spouse: Jharna Poddar

Ramendra Kumar Podder (born 9 November 1930) was an Indian Bengali scholar of biochemistry, who served as the Vice Chancellor of the University of Calcutta. He was a Member of Parliament, representing West Bengal in the Rajya Sabha the upper house of India's Parliament as a member of the Communist Party of India (Marxist).

Podder was educated at the renowned Scottish Church College in Calcutta, and at the University of Calcutta. He would serve as the Vice Chancellor of the University of Calcutta from 20 June 1979 to 30 December 1983.
