= Saurin Bhattacharjee =

Indian politician (1926–1997)

Member of Parliament, Rajya Sabha
- In office 1978–1984
- In office 1988-1994
- Constituency: West Bengal

Personal details
- Born: 30 January 1926
- Party: Revolutionary Socialist Party
- Spouse: Mira

Saurin Bhattacharjee (1926-1997) was an Indian politician. He was a Member of Parliament, representing West Bengal in the Rajya Sabha, the upper house of India's Parliament, as a member of the Revolutionary Socialist Party.
