= Surendra Motilal Patel =

Indian politician

Surendra Motilal Patel (born 11 December 1937 in Gada, Ta-Sojitra) is an Indian politician of the Bharatiya Janata Party and a member of the Parliament of India representing Gujarat in the Rajya Sabha, the upper house of the Parliament.

He is chairman of Charotar University of Science and Technology (State Private University under the State University Act, 2009) at Changa, Ta: Petlad. His MPLAD grant (per year Rs.2 million) is allotted for school infrastructure development in rural areas. Recently he was allotted Rs. 12 Lacs for a primary school building in the tiny village of Lakkadpura at Petlad.
