= Debabrata Biswas (politician) =

Indian politician

- দেবব্রত বিশ্বাস

Member of Parliament, Rajya Sabha
- In office 3 April 1990 – 2 April 2014

Personal details
- Born: 28 September 1945 (age 80) Calcutta, Bengal Presidency, British India
- Party: All India Forward Bloc
- Spouse: Swapna Biswas
- Children: 1
- Profession: Politician

Debabrata Biswas (born 28 September 1945) is a politician and the General Secretary of the All India Forward Bloc from 1997. He was a Member of the Parliament of India representing West Bengal in the Rajya Sabha, the upper house of the Parliament.

He was Member of Rajya Sabha for four terms, 3-4-1990 to 2-4-1996, 3-4-1996 to 2-4-2002 and 3-4-2002 to 2-4-2008 and 3-4-2008 to 2-4-2014. However he resigned on 23-9-2008.

He was Leader of AIFB in Rajya Sabha. He is married to Shrimati Swapna Biswas and has one daughter. He resides in Kolkata.

== Rajya Sabha Election History ==
Position	Party	Constituency	From	To	Tenure
Member of Parliament, Rajya Sabha (1st Term)	FL	West Bengal	3 April 1990	2 April 1996	5 years, 365 days
Member of Parliament, Rajya Sabha (2nd Term)	AIFB	West Bengal	3 April 1996	2 April 2002	5 years, 364 days
Member of Parliament, Rajya Sabha (3rd Term)	AIFB	West Bengal	3 April 2002	2 April 2008	5 years, 365 days
Member of Parliament, Rajya Sabha (4th Term)	AIFB	West Bengal	3 April 2008	23 September 2008	173 days
