= Maya Devi Chettry =

Indian politician

Member of Parliament, Rajya Sabha
- In office 1952–1964
- Constituency: West Bengal

Personal details
- Born: March 1921 Kurseong, India
- Died: 1994 Home, Kurseong
- Party: Indian National Congress
- Spouse: Dil Bahadur Chettry
- Children: 3

Maya Devi Chettry was an Indian politician. She was a Member of Parliament, representing West Bengal in the Rajya Sabha the upper house of India's Parliament as a member of the Indian National Congress.
