= Rajpat Singh Doogar =

Indian politician

- Born: July 14, 1909
- Died: 1990 (aged 80–81)

Rajpat Singh Doogar (July 14, 1909 - 1990) was an Indian politician from West Bengal. He was a member of the Indian National Congress.

He was Member of the Rajya Sabha for four terms from 1952 to 1972.

He is survived by Shrimati Kamla Doogar and two sons.

== Rajya Sabha Election History ==
Position	Party	Constituency	From	To	Tenure
Member of Parliament, Rajya Sabha (1st Term)	INC	West Bengal	3 April 1952	2 April 1954	1 year, 364 days
Member of Parliament, Rajya Sabha (2nd Term)	INC	West Bengal	3 April 1954	2 April 1960	5 years, 365 days
Member of Parliament, Rajya Sabha (3rd Term)	INC	West Bengal	3 April 1960	2 April 1966	5 years, 364 days
Member of Parliament, Rajya Sabha (4th Term)	IND	West Bengal	3 April 1966	2 April 1972	5 years, 365 days
