= Ritabrata Banerjee =

Indian politician (born 1979)

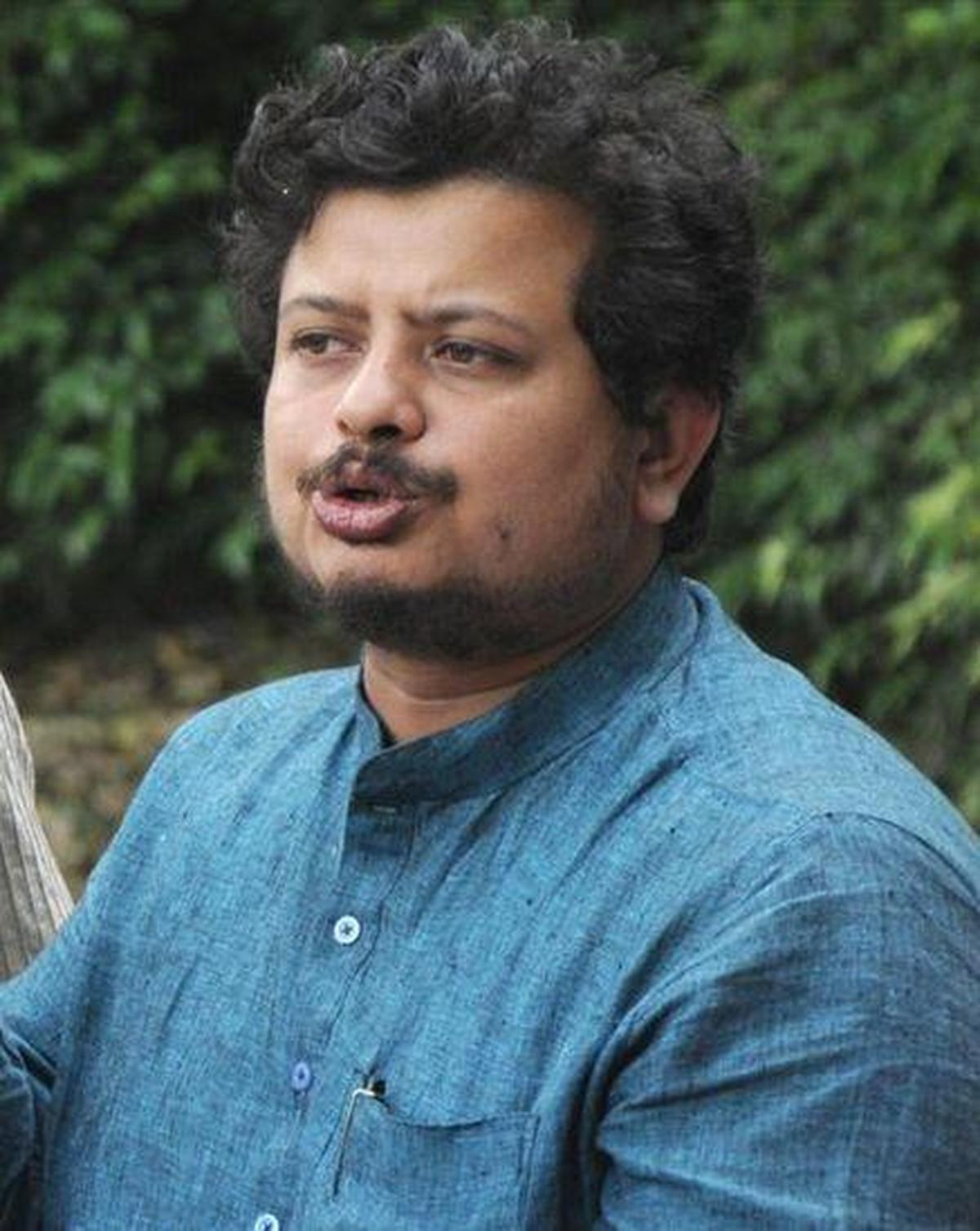
- Ritabrata Banerjee in 2026

Leader of the Opposition in the West Bengal Legislative Assembly
- Incumbent
- Assumed office 3 June 2026
- Governor: R. N. Ravi
- Preceded by: Sovandeb Chattopadhyay

Member of West Bengal Legislative Assembly
- Incumbent
- Assumed office 4 May 2026
- Preceded by: Bidesh Ranjan Bose
- Constituency: Uluberia Purba

Member of Parliament, Rajya Sabha
- In office 13 December 2024 – 2 April 2026
- Preceded by: Jawhar Sircar
- Succeeded by: Koel Mallick
- Constituency: West Bengal
- In office 3 April 2014 – 2 April 2020
- Succeeded by: Bikash Ranjan Bhattacharya
- Constituency: West Bengal

State President of INTTUC West Bengal
- In office 20 November 2020 – 1 June 2026
- Preceded by: Madan Mitra
- Succeeded by: Moloy Ghatak

General Secretary of Students' Federation of India
- In office 5 September 2008 – 25 January 2016
- Preceded by: K. K. Ragesh
- Succeeded by: Vikram Singh

Personal details
- Born: 15 November 1979 (age 46) Calcutta, West Bengal, India
- Party: Democratic Trinamool Congress (2026–present)
- Other political affiliations: Communist Party of India (Marxist) (till 2017); Independent (2017–2020) Trinamool Congress (2020-2026)
- Education: University of Calcutta (MA); Asutosh College (BA)

Ritabrata Banerjee (born 15 November 1979) is an Indian politician from West Bengal. He is currently serving as the Leader of the Opposition in the West Bengal Legislative Assembly since June 2026. He is serving as a Member of West Bengal Legislative Assembly from Uluberia Purba AC. He is the youngest leader of opposition.

== Early life ==
Banerjee attended South Point High School, Kolkata, and obtained BA degree from Asutosh College and MA degree in English at Calcutta University. He is a full-time political activist and a former General Secretary of the Student Union in his college.

== Political career ==
Banerjee's political journey began during his student days in Kolkata, when he was studying at Asutosh College. He actively became involved with Students' Federation of India, which is an affiliate of Communist Party of India (Marxist). He became extremely popular in unions as he was an efficient orator, and could grab people's attention easily.

In 2008, Ritabrata was elected as the National General Secretary of the Students' Federation of India (SFI). He led student protest, political campaigns and national conferences throughout India.

In 2017, he was accused with sexual exploitation and some explicit videos of his were leaked to the press. He also had conflicts with his party leaders Mohammed Salim, Prakash Karat, and Brinda Karat. He openely criticized them in several media shows with ABP Ananda, Republic Media. Consequently, after those interviews, he was expelled from the party.

He Cofounded Democratic Trinamool Congress with Arup Roy, A Fraction from the split from Trinamool Congress after 2026 Legislative Election. Making it the opposition party of West Bengal Legislative Assembly, as leader of opposition.

== Political controversy ==
He has been alleged along with other young comrades for harassment of former Finance minister of West Bengal Amit Mitra in New Delhi. In April 2013 in a protest program organised by Student Federation of India before the Planning Commission, few young members of the student organisation harassed Mr. Mitra.

He was suspended from CPI(M) party membership on 2 June 2017 for 3 months pending investigations to the allegations of moral turpitude and leaking party secrets to the press. On 10 October 2017 a lady named Namrata Dutta filed a complaint against Banerjee in Balurghat Police Station for sexual exploitation by promising marriage. Ritabrata denied the accusation claiming the woman was extorting money from him asked him for 50 Lakhs not to file an FIR and uploaded screenshots of a WhatsApp conversation in which she asked him for money. Subsequently, CID, West Bengal served a notice to him. Ritabrata was expelled by the CPI(M) after an interview to ABP Ananda television channel in which he spoke against Mohammed Salim. Ritabrata claimed that he was not against the party and only against Prakash Karat, Brinda Karat and Mohammed Salim.

On the month of June, after the 2026 West Bengal Legislative Assembly election result when he reported that TMC has duplicated his signature and made Sovandeb Chattopadhyay Leader of opposition as a consequence he got expelled from the party. After that He took the support of 2/3 majority and become leader of opposition and started rebel bloc of Trinomul Congress. His rebellion against the party he won sparked controversy. He also become vocal against Abhishek Banerjee's role of leading Trinamool Congress.
