= West Bengal Minority Development and Finance Corporation =

Bengal Oinority evelopment and Finance Corporation
- Motto
- Location: Salt Lake city, Calcutta, West Bengal, India
- Website: Official website

West Bengal Minority Minority Development Corporation (WBMDFC) is a government office to help religious minority groups. It is controlled by the Government of West Bengal.

== History ==
WBMDFC was established in 1996 as a result of the West Bengal Act XVIII of 1995 with the purpose of providing economic welfare, scholarships, vocational training, mass awareness and career counseling for religious minority groups (e.g. Muslims, Christians, Buddhists, Sikhs, Jains, Parsees, etc.).

== Scholarships ==
There are several scholarship that provides the minority students

Pre Matric, Post 50), Merit-cum-MeATYGG, Swami Vivekananda Merit-cum-Means, State Govt. Sponsored Stipend Under Talent Support Programme (TSP)
