= Hemaben Acharya =

Indian politician (1933–2025)

Hemaben Acharya (10 August 1933 – 11 May 2025) was an Indian politician who was leader of the Bharatiya Janata Party. She was Health minister in the Government of Gujarat from 1975 to 1980. She represented Junagadh (Vidhan Sabha constituency) in the Gujarat Legislative Assembly.

Acharya died in Junagadh on 11 May 2025, at the age of 91.
