= Savita Sharda =

Indian politician

Savita Sharda ( b 5 Nov 1947, Jammu ) is a politician from the Indian State of Gujarat and belongs to Bharatiya Janata Party.

She represents Gujarat State in Rajya Sabha, the Council of States of India parliament during 1999 to 2005.

She was Mayor of Surat Municipal Corporation in 1998 and Councillor since 1995.

She is married to Virendra Sharda and had 2 daughters. One of her daughter's is named Yogita Sharda.
