= Barun Mukherji (politician) =

Indian politician

Barun Mukherjee, a politician from All India Forward Bloc, was a Member of the Parliament of India representing West Bengal in the Rajya Sabha, the upper house of the parliament. He was a member during April 2006 to 2012 but resigned on 6 May 2008. He was again elected to Rajya Sabha in November 2008 till April 2014.
