= Prakash Chik Baraik =

Indian politician

Member of Parliament, Rajya Sabha
- Constituency: West Bengal
- Incumbent
- Assumed office 19 August 2023

Personal details
- Party: Bharatiya Janata Party (2026-present)
- Other political affiliations: All India Trinamool Congress (till 2026)
- Education: Suryasen College

Prakash Baraik is an Indian politician belonging to the Bharatiya Janata Party. He was elected to the Rajya Sabha the upper house of the Indian Parliament unopposed from West Bengal. He graduated in B.Com from Suryasen College, (University of North Bengal) Siliguri in 2004.

== Elections Contested ==
=== Rajya Sabha ===
Source
Position	Party	Constituency	From	To	Tenure
Member of Parliament, Rajya Sabha (1st Term)	AITC	West Bengal	19 August 2023	11 June 2026	2 years, 296 days
Member of Parliament, Rajya Sabha (2nd Term)	BJP	West Bengal	17 July 2026	Incumbent	87 days
