= Biplab Dasgupta =

Indian politician and economist

The Right Honourable Biplab Dasgupta

Member of Parliament, (Rajya Sabha)
- In office 1994–2005
- Constituency: West Bengal

Member of the Indian Parliament for Calcutta South
- In office 1989–1991
- Preceded by: Bholanath Sen
- Succeeded by: Mamata Banerjee

Personal details
- Born: 30 December 1938 Beleghata, West Bengal
- Died: 17 July 2005 (aged 66)
- Party: Communist Party of India (Marxist)
- Spouse: Arati Dasgupta
- Children: One Son
- Education: University of Calcutta (M.A.) London University (M.Sc.) London School of Economics (Ph.D.)
- Profession: Politician, Economist, Author, Editor

Biplab Dasgupta (30 December 1938 – 17 July 2005) was a Marxian economist, former member of Rajya Sabha, Lok Sabha and the Bengal state committee of the CPI(M). He was the author of several books on the agrarian economy of India.

== Biography ==
Dr. Biplab Dasgupta received his MA in economics from the University of Calcutta. In 1967 he received the PhD of London University as a member of SOAS for the thesis "Oil prices and the Indian market, 1886-1964" where his supervisor was Edith Penrose. He also received an MSc degree in computer science from the University of London.

Dasgupta was a popular student leader of 1950s and became a member of CPI in 1955. He joined CPI(M) in 1964.

He was elected a member of the state committee in 1980. He became a central committee member of the CPI(M) in 1985. A teacher at London and Sussex universities, Dasgupta acted as adviser to UN bodies including FAO, ILO, UNESCO, UNRISD and UNEP between 1972 and 1978. He was also the editor of Nandan Patrika, the cultural monthly of CPI(M) . He was elected to Lok Sabha in 1989.

== Death ==
Biplab Dasgupta died from Parkinson's disease at age 66.

== Notable works ==
=== Books ===
- The Oil Industry in India : some economic aspects (1971)
- The Naxalite Movement (1975)
- Patterns and Trends in Indian Politics (1976)
- Migration from Rural Areas (1977)
- Village Society and Labour Use (1977)
- Agrarian Change and the New Technology in India (1977)
- Village Studies in the Third World (1977)
- The New Agrarian Technology and India (1980)
- Naxalbadi Andolon (In hindi) (1980)
- Urbanisation Migration and Rural Change (1984)
- Calcutta's Urban Future: Agonies from the Past and Prospects for the Future (1992)
- Urbanisation in India : Basic Services and People's participation (1993)
- Structural Adjustment, Global Trade and the New Political Economy of Development (1998)
- European Trade and Colonial Conquest (Anthem South Asian Studies) (2005)
- Globalization: India's Adjustment Experience (2005)

He also wrote a number of books in Bengali on a variety of topics like his experiences as an administrator in CADC. His last book was a treatise the development of the Bengalis, their history, society, economics, culture and language.

He was also widely travelled and he regularly contributed about his experiences in forty countries and inside India in various Bengali periodicals like Pratikshan and Nandan . His experience in various parts of Africa is compelled in 'Africa Omnibus' (in Bengali).
