= Democratic Trinamool Congress =

- Abbreviation: DTC
- Leader: Ritabrata Banerjee
- Chairperson: Arup Roy
- Founder: Ritabrata Banerjee
- Founded: 18 September 2026; 59 days ago
- Split from: Trinamool Congress
- Headquarters: Kolkata, West Bengal, India
- Colours: Brown (customary); Saffron and Green (official)
- ECI status: Registered-Unrecognised
- Seats in West Bengal Legislative Assembly: 65 / 294

Election symbol

The Democratic Trinamool Congress (DTC) is a political party based in the Indian state of West Bengal. It was a breakaway faction of the Trinamool Congress, formed in September 2026 by Ritabrata Banerjee, the Leader of the Opposition in the West Bengal Legislative Assembly.

== Background ==
The party was formed after a split in All India Trinamool Congress (AITC) following the party's loss in the 2026 West Bengal Legislative Assembly election. Ritabrata Banerjee, a first-time MLA who was later expelled by the AITC, led the breakaway faction. He claimed the support of between 58 and 65 of the party's 80 MLAs in the state Assembly at various points, a figure contested by supporters of Mamata Banerjee, the longtime leader of AITC.

On 18 September 2026, the Election Commission of India allotted the name Gonotantrik Trinamool Congress, also referred to as Democratic Trinamool Congress, and the election symbol of an envelope to the faction led by Ritabrata Banerjee. The faction led by Mamata Banerjee was allotted the name "Mamata All India Trinamool Congress" and the "football player" symbol. The ECI recognized both factions as registered political parties in West Bengal, Meghalaya and Tripura for the purposes of the bypolls.

=== Election Commission ruling ===
On 18 September 2026, the Election Commission of India froze the name "All India Trinamool Congress" and its symbol "Flowers and Grass" under Paragraph 15 of the Election Symbols (Reservation and Allotment) Order, 1968, after two rival groups staked their claim to be the genuine party. The Commission ruled that a substantive determination was needed, and an interim arrangement ensured equal standing during the dispute. Both groups were ordered to submit three preferred names and symbols.

== Leadership ==
- Ritabrata Banerjee – Leader of the Opposition, West Bengal Legislative Assembly
- Arup Roy – Chairperson, National Working Committee

== See also ==
- Mamata All India Trinamool Congres
- Nationalist Citizens Party of India
