= Mriganka Mohan Sur =

Indian politician

Member of Parliament, Rajya Sabha
- In office 1954-1972
- Constituency: West Bengal

Personal details
- Born: 3 March 1889
- Party: Indian National Congress

Mriganka Mohan Sur was an Indian politician. He was a Member of Parliament representing West Bengal in the Rajya Sabha the upper house of India's Parliament as member of the Indian National Congress.
