= Ram Narayan Goswami =

Indian politician

Member of Parliament, Rajya Sabha
- In office 22 October 1986 – 18 August 1999
- Constituency: West Bengal

Member of the West Bengal Legislative Assembly
- In office 1982–1987
- Preceded by: Dwarakanath Ta
- Succeeded by: Benoy Choudhury
- Constituency: Burdwan North

Confidential Assistant of Hare Krishna Konar
- In office 1967–1974

Personal details
- Political party: Communist Party of India (Marxist)

Ram Narayan Goswami (died 9 February 2010 in Bardhaman) was an Indian communist politician and peasant leader. Goswami was a Central Committee member of the Communist Party of India (Marxist). He was a minister in the West Bengal state government 1982–1983.

Goswami became active in the peasant movement in West Bengal, led various campaigns and was jailed for his political activism.

He was the assistant of Hare Krishna Konar while konar was the minister of land and land reforms. Goswami was elected general secretary of the All India Kisan Sabha in 1989 and 1992. He had also been elected president of the West Bengal State Kisan Sabha two times.

He was elected twice to the West Bengal Legislative Assembly (1977 and 1982), and three times to the Rajya Sabha (the upper house of the Indian parliament).
