= Nepaldev Bhattacharya =

Indian politician and film director

Nepaldev Bhattacharjee

Member of Parliament, Rajya Sabha
- In office 1981-1988
- Constituency: West Bengal

Personal details
- Born: 19 December 1950
- Died: 13 May 2025 (aged 74)
- Party: Communist Party of India (Marxist)
- Spouse: Manjula Bhattacharjee
- Relatives: † Gopaldeb Bhattacharjee (Brother)

Nepaldev Bhattacharjee (19 December 1950―13 May 2025) was an Indian politician and film director. He was a Member of Parliament, representing West Bengal in the Rajya Sabha, the upper house of India's Parliament, as a member of the Communist Party of India (Marxist).

== Political career ==
Bhattacharya hailed from Bhatpara, North 24 Parganas. He was the General Secretary of Students' Federation of India for seven years from 1979. Later he became the Member of Parliament, on behalf of the CPI (M) during the period of 1981-88. He was expelled from the party for anti organisation activities. Thereafter he rejoined in State Committee of Communist Party of India (Marxist) in 2003 and remained active in trade union movement for road transport workers.

== Filmography ==
Year	Title	Cast	Ref.
2000	Chaka	Mithun Chakraborty, Debashree Roy	
