= Sarla Maheshwari =

Indian politician (born 1954)

Member of Parliament of Rajya Sabha
- In office 1990–1996
- Constituency: West Bengal
- In office 1999–2005
- Constituency: West Bengal

Personal details
- Born: 21 July 1954 (age 72) Bikaner, Rajasthan
- Party: Communist Party of India (Marxist)
- Spouse: Arun Maheshwari
- Children: 1 son and 1 daughter

Sarla Maheshwari (née Bhadani; born 21 July 1954) was an Indian politician. She was elected to the Rajya Sabha, the upper house of Indian Parliament from West Bengal as a member of the Communist Party of India (Marxist).
