= Lalitbhai Mehta =

Indian politician

Member of Parliament, Rajya Sabha
- In office 1999-2005
- Constituency: Gujarat

Personal details
- Born: 30 July 1937
- Party: Bharatiya Janata Party
- Spouse: Indumati Lalitbhai Mehta

Lalitbhai Mehta is an Indian politician. He was a Member of Parliament, representing Gujarat in the Rajya Sabha, the upper house of India's Parliament, representing the Bharatiya Janata Party.
