= Chittabrata Majumdar =

Indian politician

- Born: 14 August 1935; Dhaka
- Died: 20 February 2007 (aged 71); Kolkata
- Occupation: Political leader
- Spouse: Sabitri Majumdar

Chittabrata Majumdar (14 August 1935 – 20 February 2007) was an Indian politician. He was general secretary of Centre of Indian Trade Unions (CITU), the trade union wing of CPI(M) from 2003 till his death. He was a member of the Politburo, or executive committee, of the party. Upon his death, his body was donated to a hospital.

== Formative years ==
Born at Dhaka, now in Bangladesh in 1935, he joined the Communist Party of India (CPI) while still a student of Bangabasi College in 1954. After graduating in science he obtained another degree in textile technology. When CPI split in 1964, he joined CPI(M).

== Political career ==
Majumdar was first elected to the West Bengal state assembly in 1967 and was minister in charge of cottage and small-scale industries. As a member of the Politburo, he was also deeply involved in inter-party politics, and rose quickly within the party. He was a member of the district secretariat in Howrah in 1968, a member of the state committee in 1982, general secretary of state unit of CITU in 1991 and general secretary at the national level in 2003. As a CITU leader, he visited many countries, including the UK, Switzerland, Malaysia, France, Austria, North Korea, China and the then USSR.

Majumdar was elected a member of the Rajya Sabha in 2004. His nomination was viewed by his party as a way to "reflect the views of the working millions."

Speaking during the CPM central committee’s session at Kolkata in January 2007, which discussed land policy, Majumdar emphasized, "That policy only speaks of land for special economic zones (SEZs). The party has so far not taken any decision on how to deal with land acquisition for other industries."

Majumdar opposed foreign direct investment in India, which he believed compromised India's self-reliance.
