= Mamata All India Trinamool Congress =

- Abbreviation: MAITC (official); MTMC (alternative)
- Chairperson: Mamata Banerjee
- General Secretary: Abhishek Banerjee
- Parliamentary Chairperson: Abhishek Banerjee
- Rajya Sabha Leader: Derek O' Brien
- Lok Sabha Leader: Abhishek Banerjee
- Founder: Mamata Banerjee
- Founded: 18 September 2026; 2 months ago
- Split from: All India Trinamool Congress
- Headquarters: Kolkata, West Bengal, India
- Colours: Blue
- Slogan: Joy Bangla; Khela Hobe (Electoral Slogan); Ma Mati Manush (Political Slogan)
- ECI status: Registered-Unrecognised
- Alliance: INDIA (2026–present)
- Seats in Rajya Sabha: 9 / 245
- Seats in Lok Sabha: 8 / 543
- Seats in State Legislative Assemblies: 38 / 4,131 Indian states 15 / 294 (West Bengal) 5 / 60 (Meghalaya) 1 / 126 (Assam)
- Number of states and union territories in government: 0 / 31

Election symbol

The Mamata All India Trinamool Congress (abbreviated MAITC lit. 'Mamata All India Grassroots Congress') or simply referred to as the Mamata Trinamool Congress (MTMC) is a political party based in the Indian state of West Bengal. It is one of the two factions of the All India Trinamool Congress, formed in 2026 after a split in the party, the other being Democratic Trinamool Congress. The party is led by Mamata Banerjee, the former Chief minister of West Bengal.

== Background ==
The party was formed after a split in All India Trinamool Congress following the 2026 West Bengal Legislative Assembly election loss. The faction led by Mamata Banerjee restructured the party.

On 18 September 2026, the ECI allotted the name Mamata All India Trinamool Congress, and the election symbol of a football player to the faction led by Mamata Banerjee. The other faction was named Democratic Trinamool Congress, and was allotted the symbol of an Envelope. Both groups were to be treated as recognised political parties in West Bengal, Meghalaya and Tripura for the purposes of the bypolls.

== Leadership ==
=== List of chairpersons ===
This is a list of chairpersons of the Mamata All India Trinamool Congress.

Portrait	Name	Term Start	Term End	Ref.
	Mamata Banerjee	18 September 2026	Incumbent	

=== List of the national general secretaries ===
This is a list of national general secretaries of the Mamata All India Trinamool Congress.

Portrait	Name	Term Start	Term End	Ref.
	Abhishek Banerjee	18 September 2026	Incumbent	

=== List of Leaders in Different States ===
This is a list of leaders in different states from Mamata All India Trinamool Congress.

State	Portrait	Name	Post	Term Start	Term End	Ref.
West Bengal		Sovandeb Chattopadhyay	Leader	18 September 2026	Incumbent	
Meghalaya		Mukul Sangma	Leader of the Opposition	18 September 2026	Incumbent	
Assam		Sherman Ali Ahmed	Leader	18 September 2026	Incumbent	

== See also ==
- Democratic Trinamool Congress
- Nationalist Citizens Party of India
