= Abani Roy =

Indian politician (1939–2021)

Abani Roy (10 March 1939 – 25 November 2021) was a member of the Rajya Sabha, the upper house of the Indian Parliament, where he represented West Bengal. He was the leader of the Revolutionary Socialist Party. He was General Secretary of United Trade Union Congress. He associated with the RSP since the age of 20 in 1959, Roy was the member of its Central Secretariat, besides being the general secretary of the party for a brief period. His first foray into electoral politics was in 1978, when he was elected to the Kolkata Corporation. He entered the Rajya Sabha in 1998 and retired in August 2011.

He died on 25 November 2021 at the age of 84 at Ram Manohar Lohia Hospital in Delhi.

== Rajya Sabha Election History ==
Position	Party	Constituency	From	To	Tenure
Member of Parliament, Rajya Sabha (1st Term)	RSP	West Bengal	24 March 1998	18 August 1999	1 year, 147 days
Member of Parliament, Rajya Sabha (2nd Term)	RSP	West Bengal	19 August 1999	18 August 2005	5 years, 364 days
Member of Parliament, Rajya Sabha (3rd Term)	RSP	West Bengal	19 August 2005	18 August 2011	5 years, 364 days
