= List of Rajya Sabha members from Andhra Pradesh =

The Rajya Sabha (meaning the "Council of States") is the Upper House of the Parliament of India. Andhra Pradesh elects 11 seats and they are indirectly elected by the state legislators of Andhra Pradesh. After formation of Telangana State in 2014, 7 seats were allotted to Telangana, and 11 seats to Andhra Pradesh. The number of seats, allocated to the party, are determined by the number of seats a party possesses during nomination and the party nominates a member to be voted on. Elections in within the state legislatures are held using Single transferable vote with proportional representation.

== Current members ==
Keys: TDP (4) YSRCP (4) BJP (2) JSP (1)

#	Name	Party	Term start	Term end
1	Bhashyam Rama Krishna	TDP	22-Jun-2026	21-Jun-2032
2	Sana Sathish	TDP	22-Jun-2026	21-Jun-2032
3	Vijay Chintakayala	TDP	22-Jun-2026	21-Jun-2032
4	Beeda Masthan Rao	TDP	13-Dec-2024	21-Jun-2028
5	Y. V. Subba Reddy	YSRCP	03-Apr-2024	02-Apr-2030
6	Meda Raghunadha Reddy	YSRCP	03-Apr-2024	02-Apr-2030
7	Golla Babu Rao	YSRCP	03-Apr-2024	02-Apr-2030
8	S. Niranjan Reddy	YSRCP	22-Jun-2022	21-Jun-2028
9	R. Krishnaiah	BJP	13-Dec-2024	21-Jun-2028
10	Paka Venkata Satyanarayana	BJP	01-May-2025	21-Jun-2028
11	Lingamaneni Ramesh	JSP	22-Jun-2026	21-Jun-2032

== Chronological List of all Rajya Sabha members ==
Name	Portrait	Party	Term start	Term end	Term(s)	Notes
Paka Venkata Satyanarayana		BJP	29-Mar-2025	21-Jun-2028	1	*
R. Krishnaiah		BJP	13-Dec-2024	21-Jun-2028	2	*
Beeda Masthan Rao		TDP	13-Dec-2024	21-Jun-2028	2	*
Sana Sathish Babu		TDP	13-Dec-2024	21-Jun-2026	1	*
Y. V. Subba Reddy		YSRCP	03-Apr-2024	02-Apr-2030	1	*
Meda Raghunadha Reddy		YSRCP	03-Apr-2024	02-Apr-2030	1	*
Golla Babu Rao		YSRCP	03-Apr-2024	02-Apr-2030	1	*
V. Vijayasai Reddy		YSRCP	22-Jun-2022	21-Jun-2028	2	Resigned for MP seat on Jan 25th 2025
R. Krishnaiah		YSRCP	22-Jun-2022	21-Jun-2028	1	Resigned for MP seat on Sep 24th 2024
S. Niranjan Reddy		YSRCP	22-Jun-2022	21-Jun-2028	1	*
Beeda Masthan Rao		YSRCP	22-Jun-2022	21-Jun-2028	1	Resigned for MP seat on Aug 29th 2024
Alla Ayodhya Rami Reddy		YSRCP	22-Jun-2020	21-Jun-2026	1	*
Mopidevi Venkataramana		YSRCP	22-Jun-2020	21-Jun-2026	1	Resigned for MP seat on Aug 29th 2024
Pilli Subhash Chandra Bose		YSRCP	22-Jun-2020	21-Jun-2026	1	*
Parimal Nathwani		YSRCP	22-Jun-2020	21-Jun-2026	1	*
C. M. Ramesh		BJP	03-Apr-2018	02-Apr-2024	2	
Kanakamedala Ravindra Kumar		TDP	03-Apr-2018	02-Apr-2024	1	
Vemireddy Prabhakar Reddy		YSRCP	03-Apr-2018	02-Apr-2024	1	
T G Venkatesh		BJP	22-Jun-2016	21-Jun-2022	1	
Sujana Chowdary		BJP	22-Jun-2016	21-Jun-2022	2	
Suresh Prabhu		BJP	22-Jun-2016	21-Jun-2022	1	
V. Vijayasai Reddy		YSRCP	22-Jun-2016	21-Jun-2022	1	
Nirmala Sitharaman		BJP	26-Jun-2014	17-Jun-2016	1	bye - death of Nedurumalli Janardhana Reddy
T. Subbarami Reddy		INC	10-Apr-2014	09-Apr-2020	3	
Mohd. Ali Khan		INC	10-Apr-2014	09-Apr-2020	2	
K. V. P. Ramachandra Rao		INC	10-Apr-2014	09-Apr-2020	2	RS member from Telangana 1-Jun-2014 onwards
Garikapati Mohan Rao		BJP	10-Apr-2014	09-Apr-2020	1	RS member from Telangana 1-Jun-2014 onwards
Thota Seetharama Lakshmi		TDP	10-Apr-2014	09-Apr-2020	1	
K. Keshava Rao		BRS	10-Apr-2014	09-Apr-2020	2	
Chiranjeevi		INC	03-Apr-2012	02-Apr-2018	1	
Renuka Chowdary		INC	03-Apr-2012	02-Apr-2018	3	
Rapolu Ananda Bhaskar		INC	03-Apr-2012	02-Apr-2018	1	RS member from Telangana 1-Jun-2014 onwards
Palvai Govardhan Reddy		INC	03-Apr-2012	9-Jun-2017	1	RS member from Telangana 1-Jun-2014 onwards
C. M. Ramesh		TDP	03-Apr-2012	02-Apr-2018	2	RS member from Telangana 1-Jun-2014 onwards
Devender Goud		TDP	03-Apr-2012	02-Apr-2018	1	
Jairam Ramesh		INC	22-Jun-2010	21-Jun-2016	2	
Nedurumalli Janardhana Reddy		INC	22-Jun-2010	09-May-2014	3	death
Jesudasu Seelam		INC	22-Jun-2010	21-Jun-2016	2	
V. Hanumantha Rao		INC	22-Jun-2010	21-Jun-2016	3	RS member from Telangana 1-Jun-2014 onwards
Gundu Sudha Rani		TDP	22-Jun-2010	21-Jun-2016	1	RS member from Telangana 1-Jun-2014 onwards
Sujana Chowdary		TDP	22-Jun-2010	21-Jun-2016	1	
Nedurumalli Janardhana Reddy		INC	01-Apr-2009	21-Jun-2010	3	bye - resignation of C. Ramachandraiah
K. V. P. Ramachandra Rao		INC	10-Apr-2008	09-Apr-2014	1	
Mohd. Ali Khan		INC	10-Apr-2008	09-Apr-2014	2	
T. Subbarami Reddy		INC	10-Apr-2008	09-Apr-2014	3	
Nandi Yellaiah		INC	10-Apr-2008	14-Mar-2014	2	nominated to Andhra Pradesh Legislative Council
T. Ratna Bai		INC	10-Apr-2008	14-Mar-2014	1	nominated to Andhra Pradesh Legislative Council
Nandamuri Harikrishna		TDP	10-Apr-2008	22-Aug-2013	1	resigned
G. Sanjeeva Reddy		INC	03-Apr-2006	02-Apr-2012	1	
Dasari Narayana Rao		INC	03-Apr-2006	02-Apr-2012	2	
K. Keshava Rao		INC	03-Apr-2006	02-Apr-2012	1	
Raashid Alvi		INC	03-Apr-2006	02-Apr-2012	2	
Syed Azeez Pasha		CPI	03-Apr-2006	02-Apr-2012	1	
M. V. Mysura Reddy		TDP	03-Apr-2006	02-Apr-2012	1	
Jairam Ramesh		INC	22-Jun-2004	21-Jun-2010	1	
V. Hanumantha Rao		INC	22-Jun-2004	21-Jun-2010	2	
Gireesh Kumar Sanghi		INC	22-Jun-2004	21-Jun-2010	1	
Jesudasu Seelam		INC	22-Jun-2004	21-Jun-2010	1	
Penumalli Madhu		CPI(M)	22-Jun-2004	21-Jun-2010	1	
C. Ramachandraiah		TDP	22-Jun-2004	22-Jan-2009	2	resigned
Raashid Alvi		INC	22-Jun-2004	02-Apr-2006	1	bye - death of K. M. Khan
Sudarshan Akarapu		TDP	10-Apr-2002	09-Apr-2008	1	
S. M. Laljan Basha		TDP	10-Apr-2002	09-Apr-2008	1	
N. P. Durga		TDP	10-Apr-2002	09-Apr-2008	1	
Ravula Chandra Sekar Reddy		TDP	10-Apr-2002	09-Apr-2008	1	
T. Subbarami Reddy		INC	10-Apr-2002	09-Apr-2008	3	
Nandi Yellaiah		INC	10-Apr-2002	09-Apr-2008	2	
Alladi P Rajkumar		TDP	03-Apr-2000	02-Apr-2006	2	
Kambhampati Rama Mohana Rao		TDP	03-Apr-2000	02-Apr-2006	1	
Ramamuni Reddy Sirigi Reddy		TDP	03-Apr-2000	02-Apr-2006	1	
Vanga Geetha		TDP	03-Apr-2000	02-Apr-2006	1	
Dasari Narayana Rao		INC	03-Apr-2000	02-Apr-2006	2	
K. M. Khan		INC	03-Apr-2000	16-Oct-2003	2	death
Kimidi Kalavenkata Rao		TDP	03-Apr-1998	02-Apr-2004	1	
P. Prabhakar Reddy		TDP	03-Apr-1998	02-Apr-2004	1	
C. Ramachandraiah		TDP	03-Apr-1998	02-Apr-2004	2	
Rumandla Ramchandraiah		TDP	03-Apr-1998	02-Apr-2004	1	
Dasari Nagabhushana Rao		CPI	03-Apr-1998	02-Apr-2004	1	
Yadlapati Venkatarao		TDP	03-Apr-1998	02-Apr-2004	1	
C. Narayana Reddy		NOM	27-Aug-1997	26-Aug-2003	1	
S. Jaipal Reddy		JD	29-Sep-1997	02-Mar-1998	2	By-election due to the death of N. Giri Prasad in 1997. Elected to Lok Sabha in 1998 from Mahabubnagar, resigned on 2 March 1988 but term ends on 2 April 1988
Daggubati Venkateswara Rao		BJP	10-Apr-1996	09-Apr-2002	1	
Jaya Prada		TDP	10-Apr-1996	09-Apr-2002	1	
K M Saifullah		TDP	10/04/1996	09/04/2002	1	
S Ramachandra Reddy		TDP	10/04/1996	09/04/2002	1	
Yarlagadda Lakshmi Prasad		TDP	10-Apr-1996	09-Apr-2002	1	
Y. Radhakrishnamurthy		CPI(M)	10-Apr-1996	09-Apr-2002	1	
Mohan Babu		TDP	18-Apr-1995	02-Apr-2000	1	By-election due to the death of Majji Tulasi Das
Alladi P. Rajkumar		TDP	03-Apr-1994	02-Apr-2000	1	
Yerra Narayanaswamy		TDP	03-Apr-1994	21-Oct-1999	1	Resigned
T. Venkatram Reddy		INC	31/01/1994	02/04/2000	1	
Kishore Chandra Deo		INC	03-Apr-1994	02-Apr-2000	1	Central Minister
Majji Tulasi Das		INC	03-Apr-1994	21-Sep-1994	1	Died on 21 September 1994
K. M. Khan		INC	03-Apr-1994	02-Apr-2000	2	
N. Giri Prasad		CPI	03-Apr-1992	24-May-1997	1	dead 24/05/1997
A. S. Chowdary		INC(I)	03-Apr-1992	02-Apr-1998	3	
G. Prathap Reddy		INC(I)	03-Apr-1992	02-Apr-1998	1	
V. Hanumantha Rao		INC	03/04/1992	02/04/1998	1	
V Rajeshwar Rao		INC	03-Apr-1992	02-Apr-1998	1	
S. Jaipal Reddy		JD	10-Apr-1990	09-Apr-1996	2	Leader of Opposition in Rajya Sabha from 1991 to 1992
Pragada Kotaiah		INC(I)	10-Apr-1990	26-Nov-1995	1	Died on 26 November 1995
M. M. Hashim		INC(I)	10-Apr-1990	09-Apr-1996	1	
R. K. Dhawan		INC	10/04/1990	09/04/1996	1	
Mentay Padmanabham		TDP	13-Sep-1989	02-Apr-1994	1	By-election due to the death of L. Narsingh Naik
L. Narsingh Naik		TDP	03-Apr-1988	12-Jan-1989	1	Died on 12 January 1989
Dr. Yelamanchili Sivaji		TDP	03/04/1988	02/04/1994	1	
Narreddy Tulasi Reddy		TDP	03-Apr-1988	02-Apr-1994	1	
Dronamraju Satyanarayana		INC(I)	03-Apr-1988	02-Apr-2000	2	
Moturu Hanumantha Rao		CPI(M)	03-Apr-1988	02-Apr-1994	1	
Mohd. Khaleelur Rahman		TDP	05-Oct-1987	02-Apr-1994	2	By-election due to the death of K. L. N. Prasad
Rao Gopal Rao		TDP	03-Apr-1986	02-Apr-1992	1	
Talari Manohar		TDP	03/04/1986	02/04/1992	1	
Dr. G. Vijaya Mohan Reddy		TDP	03-Apr-1986	02-Apr-1992	1	
Kalvala Prabhakar Rao		TDP	03-Apr-1986	02-Apr-1992	1	
Renuka Chowdary		TDP	03/04/1986	02/04/1998	2	
Prof C. Lakshmanna		TDP	10-Apr-1984	09-Apr-1990	1	
Puttapaga Radhakrishna		TDP	10-Apr-1984	09-Apr-1990	1	
Yalla Sesi Bhushana Rao		TDP	10-Apr-1984	09-Apr-1990	1	
P. Upendra		TDP	10/04/1984	09/04/1996	2	
B. Satya Narayan Reddy		TDP	10-Apr-1984	09-Apr-1990	2	
S. B. Ramesh Babu		INC(I)	03-Apr-1982	02-Apr-1988	1	
Y. Adinarayana Reddy		INC(I)	03-Apr-1982	02-Apr-1988	2	
Prof. B. Ramachandra Rao		INC(I)	03-Apr-1982	02-Apr-1988	1	
P. Babul Reddy		JP	03-Apr-1982	02-Apr-1988	1	
Rayapati Sambasiva Rao		INC(I)	03-Apr-1982	02-Apr-1988	1	
Meka Rangaiah Appa Rao		INC(I)	20-Mar-1981	02-Apr-1982	1	
T. Chandrasekhar Reddy		INC	16/09/1981	02/04/1996	3	
K. V. R. S. Balasubba Rao		INC(I)	20-Mar-1981	09-Apr-1984	1	By-election due to the resignation of T. Anjaiah in 1981
Syed Rahmat Ali		INC(I)	03-Apr-1980	02-Apr-1986	1	
B. Krishna Mohan		INC(I)	03-Apr-1980	02-Apr-1986	1	
G. Swamy Naik		INC(I)	03-Apr-1980	02-Apr-1992	2	
Roda Mistry		INC	03-Apr-1980	02-Apr-1986	1	
A. S. Chowdary		INC(I)	03-Apr-1980	02-Apr-1986	3	
B. Satya Narayan Reddy		JP	10-Apr-1978	09-Apr-1984	2	Governor
Ghouse Mohiuddin Shaikh		INC	10/04/1978	09/04/1984	1	
Chadalavada Venkatrao		INC	10/04/1978	09/04/1984	1	
T. Anjaiah		INC(I)	10-Apr-1978	19-Feb-1981	1	
Buddha Priya Maurya		INC(I)	10-Apr-1978	09-Apr-1984	1	
N. P. Chengalraya Naidu		INC(I)	10-Apr-1978	09-Apr-1984	1	
N G Ranga		INC	18/07/1977	02/04/1980	2	
Mohammad Rahamathulla		INC(I)	03-Apr-1976	02-Apr-1982	1	
Palavalasa Rajasekharam		INC(I)	03-Apr-1976	02-Apr-1982	1	
M Y Saleem		INC	03/04/1974	02/04/1980	1	
R. Narasimha Reddy		JP	03-Apr-1974	02-Apr-1980	1	
V. C. Kesava Rao		INC(I)	03-Apr-1974	02-Apr-1986	4	
Kasu Brahmananda Reddy		INC	03-Apr-1974	20-Mar-1977	1	
Kota Punnaiah		INC	10-Apr-1972	09-Apr-1978	3	
Kasim Ali Abid		INC	10-Apr-1972	09-Apr-1978	1	
Nuthalapati Joseph		INC	30-Mar-1972	02-Apr-1974	1	
Nedurumalli Janardhana Reddy		INC	10-Apr-1972	09-Apr-1978	3	
Rathnabai Sreenivasa Rao		JP	10-Apr-1972	09-Apr-1978	1	
A. S. Chowdary		INC(I)	10-Apr-1972	09-Apr-1978	3	
Bezawada Papi Reddy		JP	10-Apr-1972	09-Apr-1978	1	
Todal Basar		INC	27/05/1972	26/05/1978	1	
M. R. Krishna		INC(I)	19-Jul-1972	02-Apr-1982	2	
K. L. N. Prasad		INC(I)	03-Apr-1970	16-Jul-1987	3	Died on 16 July 1987
V. B. Raju		INC(U)	03-Apr-1970	02-Apr-1982	2	
Venigalla Satyanarayana		INC	03/04/1970	02/04/1982	2	
Gaddam Narayana Reddy		INC	03-Apr-1970	02-Apr-1976	1	
Katragadda Srinivasa Rao		Independent	03-Apr-1970	02-Apr-1976	1	
M Anandam		INC(I)	11-Mar-1969	02-Apr-1980	2	
Marri Chenna Reddy		INC	27-Mar-1967	26-Nov-1968	2	
M. Srinivasa Reddy		INC	03-Apr-1968	02-Apr-1974	1	
Jagarlamudi Chandramouli		SWA	03-Apr-1968	02-Apr-1974	1	
Sanda Narayanappa		INC(O)	03-Apr-1968	02-Apr-1974	1	
M H Samuel		INC	03/04/1968	02/04/1974	3	
Yasoda Reddy		INC	23/03/1967	02/04/1972	2	
J. C. Nagi Reddy		INC(O)	03-Apr-1966	02-Apr-1972	2	
M. V. Bhadram		CPI	03-Apr-1966	02-Apr-1972	1	
J H Subbiah		Independent	03/04/1966	02/04/1972	2	
K. P. Mallikarjunudu		INC(O)	03-Apr-1966	02-Apr-1972	1	
Neelam Sanjiva Reddy		INC	03-Apr-1966	24-Feb-1967	3	Elected to Lok Sabha
Y. Adinarayana Reddy		INC	03-Apr-1964	02-Apr-1970	1	
Damodaram Sanjivayya		INC	03/04/1964	02/04/1976	2	Central Minister
Neelam Sanjiva Reddy		INC	20-Nov-1964	02-Apr-1966	3	
Yella Reddy		CPI	03/04/1964	02/04/1970	1	
M. L. Mary Naidu		INC	03-Apr-1964	02-Apr-1970	1	
V. C. Kesava Rao		INC	03/04/1962	02/04/1968	1	
K. V. Raghunatha Reddy		INC	03-Apr-1962	02-Apr-1980	3	Central Minister & Governor
Kasu Vengala Reddy		INC	03-Apr-1962	02-Apr-1968	1	
C. Ammanna Raja		INC	03-Apr-1962	02-Apr-1968	1	
P. K. Kumaran		CPI	03-Apr-1962	02-Apr-1968	1	
N. Narotham Reddy		INC	03-Apr-1962	02-Apr-1968	2	
Burgula Ramakrishna Rao		INC	21-Jun-1962	02-Apr-1966	1	
Kota Punnaiah		INC	03-Apr-1960	02-Apr-1972	3	
D. Ramanuja Rao		INC	16-Jun-1960	02-Apr-1962	1	
J. C. Nagi Reddy		INC	03-Apr-1960	16-Sep-1964	2	
K. L. Narasimha Rao		INC	03-Apr-1960	02-Apr-1966	1	
Narla Venkateswara Rao		INC	03-Apr-1958	02-Apr-1970	2	
S Channa Reddy		INC	03/04/1958	02/04/1964	1	
Narsing Rao		INC	03/04/1958	02/04/1964	1	
Smt Yudvir Seeta		INC	03/04/1958	02/04/1970	2	
Bezawada Gopala Reddy		INC	18-Aug-1958	27-Feb-1962	2	
A. Chakradhar		Independent	03-Apr-1958	02-Apr-1964	1	
M H Samuel		INC	18/04/1957	02/04/1964	2	
N. Narotham Reddy		INC	02-Apr-1956	15-Mar-1960	2	
Yasoda Reddy		INC	15/02/1956	02/04/1962	1	
V K Dhage		Independent	03/04/1956	02/04/1960	1	HY state
Janardhan Rao Desai		Independent	03/04/1956	02/04/1962	1	Mysore State
T J M Wilson		INC	07/07/1955	02/04/1958	1	
B V Gurumoorthy		INC	15/02/1954	02/04/1956	1	
Akbar Ali Khan		INC	03-Apr-1954	02-Apr-1972	3	
Shaik Galib		INC	03-Apr-1954	12-Jul-1958	1	
V Prasad Rao		CPI	03/04/1954	02/04/1960	1	HY state
J V K Vallabh Rao		CPI	03/04/1954	02/04/1960	1	
Adduru Balarami Reddy		INC	30-Nov-1953	09-Mar-1962	2	
Alluri Satyanarayana Raju		INC	19-Nov-1953	02-Apr-1960	2	
V Venkataramana		INC	30/11/1953	02/04/1962	2	
Nandury Durga Mallikarjuna Prasada Rao		CPI	30-Nov-1953	02-Apr-1956	1	bye 1953
D Italia Dinshaw		Independent	03/04/1952	02/04/1956	1	HY 52-56
B S Venkat Rao		Independent	03/04/1952	02/04/1954	1	dea 04/11/1953 HY state
Osman Sobani		Independent	03/04/1952	02/04/1954	1	HY state
J H Subbiah		Independent	03/04/1952	02/04/1954	1	HY state
Puranmal S Lahoti		INC	03/04/1952	02/04/1956	1	
K Narayanappa		INC	03/04/1952	02/04/1954	1	
Neelam Sanjiva Reddy		INC	22-Aug-1952	15-Sep-1953	3	Madras State, Resigned to become Deputy Chief Minister of newly formed Andhra State
Puchalapalli Sundarayya		CPI	03/04/1952	21/03/1955	1	
Dr. Raj Bahadur Gour		CPI	03-Apr-1952	02-Apr-1962	2	
Makineni Basavapunnaiah		CPI	03/04/1952	02/04/1966	3	
