= 2026 Rajya Sabha elections =

Elections for the upper house of Indian Parliament

- 16 March, 18 June, 24 July, 16 October, 12 November and TBD, 2026

81 (Note: including 9 casual vacancies) of the 233 (Note: excluding 12 nominated seats.) elected seats in the Rajya Sabha 123 (Note: out of 245 (including 12 nominated seats.)) total seats needed for a majority
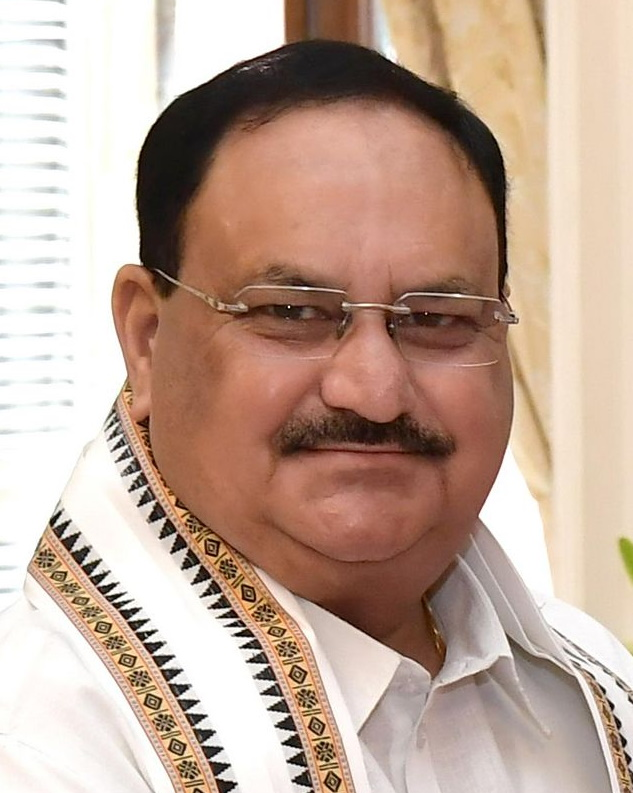

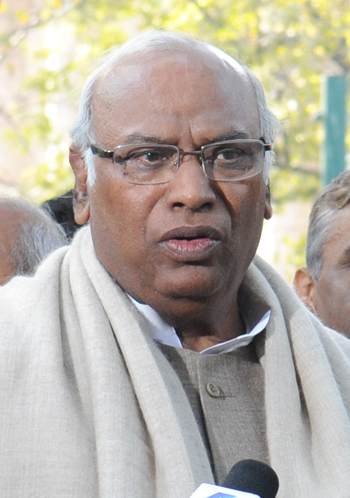
	First party	Second party
Leader	J. P. Nadda	Mallikarjun Kharge
Party	BJP	INC
Alliance	NDA	INDIA
Leader since	24 June 2024	16 February 2021
Seats before	97 (Note: excluding 5 nominated members.)	27
Seats after	113	30
Seat change	▲16	▲3
Alliance seats before	121 (Note: excluding 12 nominated members.)	80
Alliance seats after	142	64
Seat change	▲21	▼16
Majority before election
National Democratic Alliance
Majority after election
National Democratic Alliance

The 2026 Rajya Sabha elections were held as part of a routine six-year cycle of the upper house of the Parliament of India from 16 March to 16 October 2026 to elect 80 (Note: including 8 casual vacancies) of its 245 members, of which the states through their legislators elect 233, and the remaining 12 are appointed by the President.

The ruling National Democratic Alliance went on to retain and significantly expand its majority.

== Electoral system ==
MPs are elected through indirect election by the members of the State legislative assemblies using the system of proportional representation by means of the single transferable vote. Each voter (MLA) ranks candidates in the order of preference (marking 1, 2, 3 and so on) under an open ballot system. Candidates have to reach a specific quota of votes in order to win a seat.

$\text{Quota} = \left( \frac{\text{Total valid votes}}{\text{Vacancies} + 1} \right) + 1$

For a single-seat election, each ballot is valued at one. When multiple seats are filled, the ballot value is set to one hundred.

A candidate is elected unopposed when the number of candidates matches the number of available seats after nominations and withdrawals period.

== Schedule ==
Poll event	March election	June election	July By-elections	October election	November By-election
Seats Up for Election	37	24 + 3 By-elections	3 By-elections	11 + 1 By-election	1 By-election
Date of Notification	26 February 2026	1 June 2026	7 July 2026	29 September 2026	26 October 2026
Last date for filing nomination	5 March 2026	8 June 2026	14 July 2026	6 October 2026	2 November 2026
Scrutiny of nomination	6 March 2026	9 June 2026	15 July 2026	7 October 2026	3 November 2026
Last date for withdrawal of nomination	9 March 2026	11 June 2026	17 July 2026	9 October 2026	5 November 2026
Date of Poll (if necessary) & Declaration of Result	16 March 2026	18 June 2026	24 July 2026	16 October 2026	12 November 2026

== Results ==
Alliance/ Party		Seats Before	Seats After	+/-
NDA	BJP	31	39	▲8
NDA	ADMK	2	1	▼1
NDA	JD(U)	2	2	Steady
NDA	JD(S)	1	0	▼1
NDA	NCP	1	2	▲1
NDA	NPP	1	1	Steady
NDA	RLM	1	1	Steady
NDA	RPI(A)	1	1	Steady
NDA	TDP	1	3	▲2
NDA	TMC(M)	1	0	▼1
NDA	JSP	0	1	▲1
NDA	PMK	0	1	▲1
NDA	SHS	0	1	▲1
NDA	IND	0	2	▲2
NDA	Total	42	55	▲13
INDIA	INC	8	11	▲3
INDIA	AITC	8	4	▼4
INDIA	NCP-SP	2	1	▼1
INDIA	RJD	2	0	▼2
INDIA	AJP	1	0	▼1
INDIA	CPI(M)	1	0	▼1
INDIA	JMM	1	1	–
INDIA	SP	1	2	▲1
INDIA	SS(UBT)	1	0	▼1
INDIA	Total	25	19	▼6
Others	DMK	4	2	▼2
Others	BJD	3	1	▼2
Others	YSRCP	3	0	▼3
Others	BSP	1	0	▼1
Others	MNF	1	0	▼1
Others	BRS	1	0	▼1
Others	DMDK	0	1	▲1
Others	UPPL	0	1	▲1
Others	ZPM	0	1	▲1
Others	Total	13	6	▼7

== March election ==
Elections were held in Bihar, Haryana & Odisha to elect those states' Rajya Sabha MPs on 16 March 2026. For the rest of the states, MPs were elected unopposed as the number of candidates matched the number of available seats after the nomination and withdrawal period.

=== Assam ===
#	Previous MP	Party	Term end	Elected MP	Party
1	Bhubaneshwar Kalita	BJP	9-Apr-2026	Jogen Mohan	BJP
2	Rameswar Teli	BJP	9-Apr-2026	Terash Gowalla	BJP
3	Ajit Kumar Bhuyan	AJP	9-Apr-2026	Pramod Boro	UPPL

=== Bihar ===
#	Previous MP	Party	Term end	Elected MP	Party
1	Harivansh Narayan Singh	JD(U)	9-Apr-2026	Nitish Kumar	JD(U)
2	Ram Nath Thakur	JD(U)	9-Apr-2026	Ram Nath Thakur	JD(U)
3	Prem Chand Gupta	RJD	9-Apr-2026	Nitin Nabin	BJP
4	Amarendra Dhari Singh	RJD	9-Apr-2026	Shivesh Kumar	BJP
5	Upendra Kushwaha	RLM	9-Apr-2026	Upendra Kushwaha	RLM

=== Chhattisgarh ===
#	Previous MP	Party	Term end	Elected MP	Party
1	K. T. S. Tulsi	INC	9-Apr-2026	Laxmi Verma	BJP
2	Phulo Devi Netam	INC	9-Apr-2026	Phulo Devi Netam	INC

=== Haryana ===
#	Previous MP	Party	Term end	Elected MP	Party
1	Kiran Chaudhary	BJP	9-Apr-2026	Sanjay Bhatia	BJP
2	Ram Chander Jangra	BJP	9-Apr-2026	Karamvir Singh Boudh	INC

=== Himachal Pradesh ===
#	Previous MP	Party	Term end	Elected MP	Party
1	Indu Goswami	BJP	9-Apr-2026	Anurag Sharma	INC

=== Maharashtra ===
#	Previous MP	Party	Term end	Elected MP	Party
1	Dhairyashil Patil	BJP	2-Apr-2026	Vinod Tawde	BJP
2	Bhagwat Karad	BJP	2-Apr-2026	Ramrao Wadkute	BJP
3	Rajani Patil	INC	2-Apr-2026	Maya Ivnate	BJP
4	Priyanka Chaturvedi	SS(UBT)	2-Apr-2026	Jyoti Waghmare	SHS
5	Ramdas Athawale	RPI(A)	2-Apr-2026	Ramdas Athawale	RPI(A)
6	Fouzia Khan	NCP-SP	2-Apr-2026	Parth Pawar	NCP
7	Sharad Pawar	NCP-SP	2-Apr-2026	Sharad Pawar	NCP-SP

=== Odisha ===
#	Previous MP	Party	Term end	Elected MP	Party
1	Mamata Mohanta	BJP	2-Apr-2026	Manmohan Samal	BJP
2	Sujeet Kumar	BJP	2-Apr-2026	Sujeet Kumar	BJP
3	Munna Khan	BJD	2-Apr-2026	Santrupt Misra	BJD
4	Niranjan Bishi	BJD	2-Apr-2026	Dilip Ray	IND

=== Tamil Nadu ===
#	Previous MP	Party	Term end	Elected MP	Party
1	Tiruchi Siva	DMK	2-Apr-2026	Tiruchi Siva	DMK
2	N. R. Elango	DMK	2-Apr-2026	J. Constantine Ravindran	DMK
3	P. Selvarasu	DMK	2-Apr-2026	M. Christopher Tilak	INC
4	Kanimozhi N. V. N. Somu	DMK	2-Apr-2026	L. K. Sudhish	DMDK
5	M. Thambidurai	AIADMK	2-Apr-2026	M. Thambidurai	AIADMK
6	G. K. Vasan	TMC(M)	2-Apr-2026	Anbumani Ramadoss	PMK

=== Telangana ===
#	Previous MP	Party	Term end	Elected MP	Party
1	Abhishek Manu Singhvi	INC	9-Apr-2026	Abhishek Manu Singhvi	INC
2	K. R. Suresh Reddy	BRS	9-Apr-2026	Vem Narender Reddy	INC

=== West Bengal ===
#	Previous MP	Party	Term end	Elected MP	Party
1	Subrata Bakshi	AITC	2-Apr-2026	Babul Supriyo	AITC
2	Ritabrata Banerjee	AITC	2-Apr-2026	Koel Mallick (Note: Resigned from Rajya Sabha membership on 16 July 2026, and joined Bharatiya Janata Party in October 2026.)	AITC
3	Mausam Noor (Note: Defected from TMC to INC in January 2026.)	AITC	2-Apr-2026	Menaka Guruswamy	AITC
4	Saket Gokhale	AITC	2-Apr-2026	Rajeev Kumar	AITC
5	Bikash Ranjan Bhattacharya	CPI(M)	2-Apr-2026	Rahul Sinha	BJP

== June election ==
=== Andhra Pradesh ===
#	Previous MP	Party	Term end	Elected MP	Party
1	Sana Satish	TDP	21-Jun-2026	Sana Satish	TDP
2	Alla Ayodhya Rami Reddy	YSRCP	21-Jun-2026	Bhashyam Rama Krishna	TDP
3	Pilli Subhash Chandra Bose	YSRCP	21-Jun-2026	Chintakayala Vijay	TDP
4	Parimal Nathwani	YSRCP	21-Jun-2026	Lingamaneni Ramesh	JSP

=== Arunachal Pradesh ===
#	Previous MP	Party	Term end	Elected MP	Party
1	Nabam Rebia	BJP	23-Jun-2026	Tai Tagak	BJP

=== Gujarat ===
#	Previous MP	Party	Term end	Elected MP	Party
1	Rambhai Mokariya	BJP	21-Jun-2026	Rajesh Shukla	BJP
2	Ramilaben Bara	BJP	21-Jun-2026	Mukesh Rathwa	BJP
3	Narhari Amin	BJP	21-Jun-2026	Mansingh Parmar	BJP
4	Shaktisinh Gohil	INC	21-Jun-2026	Jitendra Kanjariya	BJP

=== Jharkhand ===
#	Previous MP	Party	Term end	Elected MP	Party
1	Vacant (Note: Death of Shibu Soren)			Baidyanath Ram	JMM
2	Deepak Prakash	BJP	21-Jun-2026	Parimal Nathwani	IND

=== Karnataka ===
#	Previous MP	Party	Term end	Elected MP	Party
1	Iranna B. Kadadi	BJP	25-Jun-2026	M. Nagaraja	BJP
2	K. Narayan	BJP	25-Jun-2026	Pawan Khera	INC
3	Mallikarjun Kharge	INC	25-Jun-2026	Mallikarjun Kharge	INC
4	H. D. Deve Gowda	JD(S)	25-Jun-2026	Mansoor Ali Khan	INC

=== Madhya Pradesh ===
#	Previous MP	Party	Term end	Elected MP	Party
1	George Kurian	BJP	21-Jun-2026	Tarun Chugh	BJP
2	Sumer Singh Solanki	BJP	21-Jun-2026	Rajneesh Agrawal	BJP
3	Digvijaya Singh	INC	21-Jun-2026	Mahesh Kewat	BJP

=== Manipur ===
#	Previous MP	Party	Term end	Elected MP	Party
1	Leishemba Sanajaoba	BJP	21-Jun-2026	Adhikarimayum Sharda Devi	BJP

=== Meghalaya ===
#	Previous MP	Party	Term end	Elected MP	Party
1	Wanweiroy Kharlukhi	NPP	21-Jun-2026	James Sangma	NPP

=== Mizoram ===
#	Previous MP	Party	Term end	Elected MP	Party
1	K. Vanlalvena	MNF	19-Jul-2026	K Laltluangkima	ZPM

=== Rajasthan ===
#	Previous MP	Party	Term end	Elected MP	Party
1	Rajendra Gehlot	BJP	21-Jun-2026	Satish Poonia	BJP
2	Ravneet Singh Bittu	BJP	21-Jun-2026	Alka Gurjar	BJP
3	Neeraj Dangi	INC	21-Jun-2026	Neeraj Dangi	INC

== October election ==
=== Uttarakhand ===
#	Previous MP	Party	Term end	Elected MP	Party
1	Naresh Bansal	BJP	25-Nov-2026	Dinesh Arya	BJP

=== Uttar Pradesh ===
#	Previous MP	Party	Term end	Elected MP	Party
1	Hardeep Singh Puri	BJP	25-Nov-2026	Dharmpal Singh	BJP
2	Dinesh Sharma	BJP	25-Nov-2026	Radha Kant Ojha	BJP
3	Seema Dwivedi	BJP	25-Nov-2026	Ram Prakash Pal	BJP
4	Brij Lal	BJP	25-Nov-2026	Vidyasagar Sonkar	BJP
5	Arun Singh	BJP	25-Nov-2026	Gopi Krishna Pandey	BJP
6	Neeraj Shekhar	BJP	25-Nov-2026	Priyanka Singh Rawat	BJP
7	Geeta Shakya	BJP	25-Nov-2026	Ram Pratap Singh	BJP
8	B. L. Verma	BJP	25-Nov-2026	Shruti Gangwar	BJP
9	Ram Gopal Yadav	SP	25-Nov-2026	Ram Gopal Yadav	SP
10	Ramji Gautam	BSP	25-Nov-2026	Dhanraj Nathwani	SP

== Nominated ==
#	Previous MP	Party	Term end	Nominated MP	Party
1	Ranjan Gogoi	NOM	16-Mar-2026	Harivansh Narayan Singh	NOM

== By-elections ==
=== Madhya Pradesh ===
#	Previous MP	Party	Vacancy date	Elected MP	Party	Term start	Term End	Reason for Vacancy
1	L. Murugan	BJP	13-Oct-2026	Hardeep Singh Puri	BJP	05-Nov-2026	02-Apr-2030	Resignation

=== Maharashtra ===
#	Previous MP	Party	Vacancy date	Elected MP	Party	Term start	Term End	Reason for Vacancy
1	Sunetra Pawar	NCP	6-May-2026	Rajendra Jain	NCP	18-Jun-2026	4-Jul-2028	Elected to 15th Maharashtra Assembly
2	Ramrao Wadkute	BJP	22 November 2026	TBD				Death

=== Odisha ===
#	Previous MP	Party	Vacancy date	Elected MP	Party	Term start	Term end	Reason for Vacancy
1	Debashish Samantaray	BJD	25-May-2026	Debashish Samantaray	BJP	18-Jun-2026	3-Apr-2030	Resignation

=== Tamil Nadu ===
#	Previous MP	Party	Vacancy date	Elected MP	Party	Term start	Term end	Reason for Vacancy
1	C. V. Shanmugam	AIADMK	7-May-2026	Praveen Chakravarty	INC	18-Jun-2026	29-Jun-2028	Elected to 17th Tamil Nadu Assembly

=== West Bengal ===
#	Previous MP	Party	Vacancy date	Elected MP	Party	Term start	Term end	Reason for Vacancy
1	Sukhendu Sekhar Roy	AITC	8-Jun-2026	Sukhendu Sekhar Roy	BJP	17-Jul-2026	18-Aug-2029	Resignation
2	Sushmita Dev	AITC	10-Jun-2026	Sushmita Dev	BJP	17-Jul-2026	2-Apr-2030	Resignation
3	Prakash Chik Baraik	AITC	11-Jun-2026	Prakash Chik Baraik	BJP	17-Jul-2026	18-Aug-2029	Resignation
4	Koel Mallick	AITC	16-Jul-2026	Koel Mallick	BJP	10-Oct-2026	2-Apr-2032	Resignation
