= 1972 Rajya Sabha elections =

Elections for the Upper House of Indian Parliament

Rajya Sabha elections were held in 1972, to elect members of the Rajya Sabha, Indian Parliament's upper chamber.

== Elections ==
Elections were held in 1972 to elect members from various states. The list is incomplete.

=== Members elected ===
The following members are elected in the elections held in 1972. They are members for the term 1972-78 and retire in year 1978, except in case of the resignation or death before the term.

State - Member - Party

Rajya Sabha members for term 1972-1978
	Member Name	Party	Remark
Andhra Pradesh	KASIM ALI ABID	INC	R
Andhra Pradesh	A. S. Chowdhri	IND	
Andhra Pradesh	Kota Punnaiah	INC	
Andhra Pradesh	N. Janardhana Reddy	INC	
Andhra Pradesh	Todak Basar	INC	
Andhra Pradesh	Bezavada Pepireddi	OTH	
Andhra Pradesh	Rathnabai S Rao	INC	
Assam	B C Bhagawati	INC	
Assam	Nabin Chandra Buragohain	INC	
Assam	Nripati Ranjan Choudhury	INC	
Bihar	Yogendra Sharma	CPI	
Bihar	Jahanara Jaipal Singh	INC	
Bihar	Bhupendra Narayan Mandal	SSP	dea 30/05/1975
Bihar	D.P. Singh	INC	
Bihar	Shyam Lal Gupta	INC	
Bihar	Bhaiya Ram Munda	INC	
Bihar	Gunanand Thakur	INC	
Delhi	Savita Behen	INC	
Gujarat	Ibrahim Kalaniya	INC	
Gujarat	Himmat Sinh	INC	
Gujarat	Sumitra G Kulkarni	INC	
Gujarat	H M Trivedi	JAN	
Haryana	Krishna Kant	INC	20/03/1977 LS
Haryana	Ranbir Singh	INC	
Himachal Pradesh	Jagannath Bhardwaj	JAN	
Jammu & Kashmir	D. P. Dhar	INC	res 07/02/1975
Karnataka	Maqsood Ali Khan	INC	
Karnataka	H S Narasiah	INC	15/05/1977
Karnataka	T A Pai	INC	21/03/1977 LS
Karnataka	Veerendra Patil	OTH	
Madhya Pradesh	Nand Kishore Bhatt	INC	
Madhya Pradesh	Vidyawati Chaturvedi	INC	
Madhya Pradesh	Virendra Kumar Saklecha	OTH	res 26/06/1977
Madhya Pradesh	Mahendra Bahadur Singh	INC	
Madhya Pradesh	Shankarlal Tiwari	INC	
Maharashtra	Sushila S Adivarekar	INC	
Maharashtra	D Y Pawar	INC	
Maharashtra	Gulabrao Patil	INC	
Maharashtra	N H Kumbhare	INC	
Maharashtra	Vinaykumar R Parashar	INC	
Maharashtra	Dr M R Vyas	INC	
Maharashtra	Sikandar Ali Wajd	INC	
Manipur	Salam Tombi	OTH	res 04/04/1974
Meghalaya	Showaless K Shilla	OTH	
Mizoram	Lalbuaia	INC	
Nominated	Abraham Abu	NOM	
Nominated	Premantha Nath Bisi	NOM	
Nominated	C. K. Daphtary	NOM	
Nominated	Tanvir Habib	NOM	
Orissa	Lokanath Misra	JAN	
Orissa	Brahmananda Panda	OTH	
Orissa	C P Majhi	INC	
Orissa	Saraswati Pradhan	INC	
Punjab	Mohan Singh	INC	
Punjab	Sita Devi	INC	dea 22/03/1974
Rajasthan	Jamnalal Berwa	INC	
Rajasthan	Lakshmi Kumari Chundawat	INC	
Rajasthan	Ganesh Lal Mali	INC	
Tamil Nadu	M S Abdul Khader	AIADMK	
Tamil Nadu	V.V. Swaminathan	AIADMK	
Tamil Nadu	M Kamalanathan	DMK	
Tamil Nadu	M C Balan	AIADMK	
Tamil Nadu	K A Krishnaswamy	AIADMK	
Tamil Nadu	A K Rafaye	MI	
Uttar Pradesh	Dr Z A Ahmad	CPI	
Uttar Pradesh	Sukhdev Prasad	INC	
Uttar Pradesh	Prof Saiyid Nurul Hasan	INC	
Uttar Pradesh	Dr M M S Siddhu	INC	
Uttar Pradesh	Mohan Singh Oberoi	OTH	
Uttar Pradesh	Banarsi Das	JAN	res 28/06/1977
Uttar Pradesh	Yashpal Kapur	INC	
Uttar Pradesh	Harsh Deo Malaviya	INC	
Uttar Pradesh	V R Mohan	IND	dea 28/01/1973
Uttar Pradesh	Anand Narain Mulla	INC	
Uttar Pradesh	Dr V B Singh	INC	
Uttar Pradesh	Omprakash Tyagi	JAN	21/03/1977
West Bengal	Sardar Ali Amjad	INC	
West Bengal	Dr Rajat Kumar Chakrabarti	INC	
West Bengal	Krishna Bahadur Chettri	INC	22/03/1977
West Bengal	Kali Mukherjee	INC	
West Bengal	Sanat Kumar Raha	CPI	

== Bye-elections ==
The following bye elections were held in the year 1972.

State - Member - Party

1. OR - K P Singh Deo - OTH ( ele 28/01/1972 term till 1976 )
2. AP - Nuthalapati Joseph - INC ( ele 30/03/1972 term till 1974 )
3. MH - Saroj Khaparde - INC ( ele 03/04/1972 term till 1974 )
4. BH - Bhola Paswan Shastri - INC ( ele 31/05/1972 term till 1976 )
5. Assam - Mahendramohan Chaudhury - INC ( ele 19/06/1956 term till 1974 )
6. AP - M R Krishna - INC ( ele 19/07/1972 term till 1976 )
