= Manthena =

Manthena or Mantena (Telugu: మంతెన) is a Telugu surname. Notable people with the surname include:

- Mantena Rama Raju (born 1977), Indian politician
- Manthena Venkata Raju (1904–1968), Indian politician

== See also ==
- Manthenavaripalem, a village in Guntur district in the state of Andhra Pradesh in India.
