= Vemireddy Prabhakar Reddy =

Indian businessman and politician

Member of Parliament, Lok Sabha
- Incumbent
- Assumed office 4 June 2024
- Preceded by: Adala Prabhakara Reddy
- Constituency: Nellore

Member of Parliament, Rajya Sabha
- In office 3 April 2018 – 2 April 2024
- Preceded by: Chiranjeevi
- Succeeded by: Meda Raghunath Reddy
- Constituency: Andhra Pradesh

Personal details
- Born: Nellore, Andhra Pradesh, India
- Party: Telugu Desam Party
- Other political affiliations: YSR Congress Party
- Education: Rishi Valley School, Loyala College, Chennai

Vemireddy Prabhakar Reddy is a business person and politician who is known for founding VPR Mining Infra Pvt. Ltd. He is also a member of the Telugu Desam Party and an elected Member of Parliament (Lok Sabha) for the biennial elections held in May 2024. He started Vemireddy Prabhakar Reddy Foundation (VPR Foundation) in 2015 at Nellore, Andhra Pradesh and was doing different social activities in the name VPR Vikas, VPR Vidya and VPR Vaidya.

Vemireddy Prabhakar Reddy who was elected as Rajya Sabha MP in 2018 has quit YSRCP on 21 February 2024, and joined Telugu Desam Party on 2 March 2024 in the presence of the then former and now serving Chief Minister Andhra Pradesh Chief Minister and TDP President Nara Chandrababu Naidu. He won that election on V. Vijayasai Reddy by a huge majority of 2,45,903 votes.
