= Chikhali =

Chikhali may refer to several places in India:

- Chikhali, Rajasthan, a village in Dungarpur district, Rajasthan

== Maharashtra ==
- Chikhali Bk., a village in Pune district
- Chikhali, Pune, a village in Pune district
- Chikhali, Latur district, a village in Latur district
- Chikhali, Ratnagiri district, a village in Ratnagiri district
- Chikhali (Vidhan Sabha constituency), an Assembly constituency in Buldhana district

== See also ==
- Chikhli (disambiguation)
