= Nookala =

Nookala or Nukala (Telugu: నూకల) is a Telugu surname:

- Nookala Chinna Satyanarayana is a Carnatic musician, a classical vocalist, musicologist, author, teacher, a great administrator and motivator.
- Nookala Narotham Reddy, past Vice chancellor of Osmania University and Rajya Sabha member.
- Nukala Ramachandra Reddy, a politician from the Telangana region.
- Nookala Srinivas Reddy, Businessman, Director of Medha Servo Drives Pvt. Ltd.

Nukala Srishanth Reddy Businessman, CMD NSR INFRA DEVELOPERS
