= Chikhalia =

Chikhalia is a surname. Notable people with the surname include:

- Bhavna Chikhalia (1955–2013), Indian politician
- Deepika Chikhalia (born 1965), Indian actress

== See also ==
- Chikhali (disambiguation)
