= Modugula Venugopala Reddy =

Indian politician

Member of Legislative Assembly Andhra Pradesh
- In office 2014–2019
- Preceded by: Kanna Lakshminarayana
- Succeeded by: Maddali Giridhar Rao
- Constituency: Guntur West

Member of Parliament, Lok Sabha
- In office 2009-2014
- Preceded by: Mekapati Rajamohan Reddy
- Succeeded by: Rayapati Sambasiva Rao
- Constituency: Narasaraopet, Andhra Pradesh

Personal details
- Born: 29 May 1966 (age 60) Pedaparimi, Guntur district, Andhra Pradesh
- Party: YSR Congress Party (2018–present)
- Other political affiliations: Telugu Desam Party (2008–2018)
- Spouse: Madhavi Krishna
- Relatives: Alla Ayodhya Rami Reddy (brother in law)

Modugla Venugopala Reddy is an Indian politician, belonging to YSR Congress Party. He was with TDP till February 2019, and in 2014 he contested Andhra Pradesh Legislative Assembly and won against former Minister Kanna Lakshminarayana from Guntur West Assembly Constituency. In the 2009 election he was elected to the 15th Lok Sabha from the Narasaraopet constituency in Andhra Pradesh.

Modugula Venugopala Reddy was born to Shri Modugula Papi Reddy & Smt. Modugula Adilakshmi and is married to Smt. Madhavi Krishna.

== General Elections 2009 ==
General Election, 2009: Narasaraopet
Party	Candidate	Votes	%	±%
TDP	Modugula Venugopala Reddy	463,358	42.83	−1.08
INC	Balashowry Vallabhaneni	461,751	42.69	−10.80
PRP	Shaik Syed Saheb	114,924	10.62	
Majority		1,607	0.14	
Turnout		1,081,754	79.52	+7.82
TDP gain from INC		Swing		

== Assembly elections 2014 ==
2014 Andhra Pradesh Legislative Assembly election: Guntur West
Party	Candidate	Votes	%	±%
TDP	Modugula Venugopala Reddy	78,837	46.00	
YSRCP	Appi Reddy Lella	60,924	35.55	
Majority		17,913	10.45	
Turnout		1,71,377	66.00	
TDP gain from INC		Swing		
