= P. Venkata Satyanarayana =

Indian politician from Andhra Pradesh (born 1961)

Paka Venkata Satyanarayana

Member of Parliament, Rajya Sabha
- Incumbent
- Assumed office 9 May 2025
- Preceded by: V. Vijayasai Reddy
- Constituency: Andhra Pradesh

Personal details
- Born: 1961 (age 64–65) Bhimavaram, Andhra Pradesh, India
- Party: Bharatiya Janata Party
- Education: DNR College, Bhimavaram (L.L.B)
- Occupation: Politician
- Profession: Advocate

Paka Venkata Satyanarayana (born 1961) is an Indian politician from Bharatiya Janata Party. He was elected unopposed as the Member of Parliament, Rajya Sabha from Andhra Pradesh in 2025. Before that, he was the party vice-president for BJP Andhra Pradesh from 2018 till 2021.

== Early life ==
Satyanarayana was born in Bhimavaram, Andhra Pradesh, in 1961. Belonging to an OBC family, he is an advocate by profession.

At the age of 15, Satyanarayana joined the Rashtriya Swayamsevak Sangh (RSS) in 1976. He led the Akhil Bharatiya Vidyarthi Parishad, the student branch of the RSS, at DNR College in Andhra Pradesh and was heavily involved in student politics.

== Political career ==
Satyanarayana joined the BJP in 1980. He became the BJP town general secretary, then a district secretary, and later elected as a counsellor in Bhimavaram Municipality. Later, he served as the BJP Assembly Convener from Bhimavaram. He contested the 1996 Lok Sabha elections from Narasapur but ranked fourth, securing less than 1% of the votes. He then contested for the MLC elections in 2006 but was unsuccessful.

Satyanarayana went on to become the BJP's state executive member in 1994 and served as its district president from Bhimavaram between 2006 and 2010. From 2012 to 2018, he served as its state Official Spokesperson for the BJP in Andhra Pradesh. He was a member of the election manifesto drafting committee for the then United Andhra Pradesh in 2014. He served as the BJP Andhra Pradesh vice president from 2018 to 2021.

== Career in Rajya Sabha ==
The BJP-TDP government nominated Satyanarayana for the Rajya Sabha from the Andhra seat in April 2025. He was elected unopposed on 6 May 2025.
