= Mopidevi Venkata Ramana Rao =

Indian politician (born 1962)

Member of Parliament, Rajya Sabha
- In office 22 June 2020 – 29 August 2024
- Preceded by: Thota Seetharama Lakshmi
- Succeeded by: Sana Satish
- Constituency: Andhra Pradesh

Minister of Fisheries, Animal Husbandry & Marketing Government of Andhra Pradesh
- In office 30 May 2019 – 21 July 2020
- Governor: E. S. L. Narasimhan; Biswabhusan Harichandan
- Chief Minister: Y. S. Jagan Mohan Reddy
- Preceded by: Adinarayana Reddy
- Succeeded by: Seediri Appalaraju

Minister of Excise & Prohibition Government of Andhra Pradesh
- In office 25 May 2009 – 25 May 2012
- Governor: N. D. Tiwari; E. S. L. Narasimhan
- Chief Minister: Y. S. Rajasekhara Reddy; Konijeti Rosaiah; Kiran Kumar Reddy
- Preceded by: Jakkampudi Rammohan Rao

Minister of Infrastructure & Investment, Ports, Airports and Natural Gas Government of Andhra Pradesh
- In office 26 April 2007 – 20 May 2009
- Governor: N. D. Tiwari
- Chief Minister: Y. S. Rajasekhara Reddy
- Preceded by: Konathala Ramakrishna
- Succeeded by: Komatireddy Venkat Reddy

Member of Legislative Assembly Andhra Pradesh
- In office 2009–2014
- Preceded by: Devineni Mallikharjunarao
- Succeeded by: Anagani Satya Prasad
- Constituency: Repalle
- In office 1999–2009
- Preceded by: Seetharamamma Evuru
- Succeeded by: Constituency Dissolved
- Constituency: Kuchinapudi

Personal details
- Born: 8 June 1962 (age 63) Nizampatam
- Party: Telugu Desam Party (2024-Incumbent)
- Other political affiliations: Indian National Congress (1999 - 2012); YSR Congress Party (2012 - 2024)

Mopidevi Venkata Ramana Rao (born 1962, Nizampatam) is an Indian politician, who served as the Member of Parliament, Rajya Sabha from YSR Congress Party representing Andhra Pradesh. He was the former cabinet minister under Kiran Kumar Reddy. He also served as Ports, infrastructure and investments minister under Y. S. Rajasekhara Reddy.

== Personal life ==
He is S/o late Mopidevi Veeraragaviah, he has completed his graduation from Loyola degree college, Vijayawada.

== Political career ==
In 1989, 1994 he contested and lost from Kuchinapudi Assembly Constituency. In 1999, 2004 he won from Kuchinapudi Assembly Constituency. In 2009, he won from Repalle Assembly Constituency. In 2014, 2019 he lost from Repalle Assembly Constituency.

He was elected to Rajya Sabha, Upper House of the Parliament of India from Andhra Pradesh in the 2020 Rajyasabha elections as a member of the YSR Congress Party.

Mopidevi Venkataramana resigned to YSR Congress party's primary membership and also as Rajya Sabha MP on 29 August 2024. He joined Telugu Desam Party in the presence of Chief Minister Nara Chandrababu Naidu on 9 October 2024.

== Arrest ==
Mpidevi Venkatramana was arrested by CBI in alleged VANPIC scam along with Dharmana Prasad Rao during his ministry under Kiran Kumar Reddy.
