= Galla Madhavi =

Indian politician

Member of the Andhra Pradesh Legislative Assembly
- Incumbent
- Assumed office 2024
- Preceded by: Maddali Giridhar Rao
- Constituency: Guntur West

Personal details
- Born: 1984 (age 41–42)
- Party: Telugu Desam Party
- Education: Osmania University

Galla Madhavi (born 1984) is an Indian politician from Andhra Pradesh. She is a Member of the Legislative Assembly from Guntur West Assembly Constituency in Guntur district. She represents Telugu Desam Party. She won the 2024 Andhra Pradesh Legislative Assembly election.

== Early life and education ==
Piduguralla Madhavi, née Galla, is from Guntur, Andhra Pradesh, India. She married Galla Ramachandra Rao. She completed her Class 10 in 2000 at St. Basweshwara High School, Hyderabad and later, did her Intermediate, the pre university course, in 2002 at International Junior College, Shaikpet. In 2005, she earned a Bachelor of Science degree, and in 2008 did her post graduation in M.C.A. at Osmania University. She declared assets worth Rs.17 crore in her affidavit to the Election Commission of India.

== Political career ==
Madhavi was first elected in the 2024 Andhra Pradesh Legislative Assembly election from Guntur West Assembly Constituency representing the Telugu Desam Party. She polled 116,067 votes and defeated her nearest rival and former health minister, Vidadala Rajini of the YSR Congress Party, by a margin of 51,150 votes.

=== Controversy ===
Before the Assembly election in April 2024, Madhavi allegedly tried to file a nomination on behalf of an imposter woman, with the same name as her opponent from YSR Congress, Vidadala Rajini. The attempt was foiled after police intervened following a kidnap complaint from the woman's family members. After a search, the police found Rajani, the namesake woman, and handed her to the family. A case of violation of model code of conduct was also filed against the TDP candidate by her opponents.
