= Guntur-II Assembly constituency =

Defunct constituency of the Andhra Pradesh legislative Assembly, India

Coordinates: 16.79°N 80.94°E

Guntur-II
- Former constituency No. 101 for the Andhra Pradesh Legislative Assembly

Constituency details
- Country: India
- Region: South India
- State: Andhra Pradesh
- District: Guntur
- Lok Sabha constituency: Guntur
- Established: 1955
- Abolished: 2008
- Total electors: 187,633
- Reservation: None

Guntur-II Assembly constituency was a constituency of the Andhra Pradesh Legislative Assembly, India until the 2008 delimitation in Guntur district.

== History of the constituency ==
After the passing of the Delimitation of Parliamentary and Assembly Constituencies Act, 1952, the Guntur-II constituency was first created for the Andhra state Legislative Assembly in 1955. Its extent was:

	Firka
1	Guntur firka (excluding ward Nos. 5 to 32 of Guntur municipality)
2	Tadikonda firka (excluding Pedamaddur, Vaikuntapuram, Harischandrapuram, Pitchikaiapalem, Dondapad, Borupalem, Abbarajupalem, Rayapudi, Kondarajupalem, Lingayapalem, Uddandarayadupalem, Nelapad, Thullur, Vaddamanu and Endroy villages), in Guntur taluk.

After the passing of the States Reorganisation Act, 1956, it became a part of the new Andhra Pradesh Legislative Assembly. After the passing of the Delimitation of Parliamentary and Assembly Constituencies Act, 1962, its extent was:

	Firka
1	Guntur firka (excluding wards Nos. 5 to 32 and the houses and streets in 4th and 5th localities specified in item (59) of the Appendix in Guntur municipality), 17th street in locality No. 4 in Guntur municipality
2	Villages in Tadikonda firka specified in item (60) of the Appendix in Guntur taluk

After the passing of the Delimitation of Parliamentary and Assembly Constituencies Act, 1976, its extent was:

	Firka
1	Guntur firka (excluding Wards 11 to 30 in Guntur municipality and 56-Mandapadu, 57-Velvarthipadu, 58-Visadala, 60-Bandarupalli, 66-Jonnalagadda, 67-Lam, 68-Damarapalli and 71-Gorantla villages) in Guntur taluk.

It was not present in the Delimitation of Parliamentary and Assembly Constituencies Order, 2008 and hence was defunct as of the 2009 Andhra Pradesh Legislative Assembly election.

Guntur West Assembly constituency was created by the 2008 delimitation. It covers Guntur mandal (Part), Guntur (M.Corp) (Part) and Guntur (M.Corp) – Ward No.1 to 6 and 24 to 28.

Mandal
Guntur mandal

== Overview ==
It was a part of the Guntur Lok Sabha constituency along with another six Andhra Pradesh Legislative Assembly segments, namely, Prathipad, Guntur-I, Tadikonda, Sattenapalli, Peddakurapadu and Chilakaluripet.

== Members of the Legislative Assembly ==
Year	Member	Political party
1955	Meduri Nageswara Rao	Indian National Congress
1962	Chebrolu Hanumaiah	Indian National Congress
1967	Chebrolu Hanumaiah	Indian National Congress
1972	Nissankara Rao Venkatarathnam	Independent
1978	Gade Veeranjaneya Sharma	Indian National Congress (I)
1983	Nissankara Rao Venkatarathnam	Telugu Desam Party
1985	Chadalavada Jayarambabu	Indian National Congress
1989	Chadalavada Jayarambabu	Indian National Congress
1994	Challa Venkata Krishna Reddy	Telugu Desam Party
1999	Sanakkayala Aruna	Telugu Desam Party
2004	Tadisetti Venkatarao	Indian National Congress

== Election results ==
=== 1955 ===
1955 Andhra State Legislative Assembly election: Guntur-II
Party	Candidate	Votes	%	±%
INC	Meduri Nageswara Rao	21,648	52.30%	
CPI	Bellamkonda Veeraiah	18,352	44.34%	
Margin of victory		3,296	7.96%	
Turnout		41,389	60.13%	
Registered electors		68,830		
INC win (new seat)				

=== 1962 ===
1962 Andhra Pradesh Legislative Assembly election: Guntur-II
Party	Candidate	Votes	%	±%
INC	Chebrolu Hanumaiah	26,261	49.42%	
CPI	Damineni Yagna Ramaiah	25,903	48.75%	
Margin of victory		358	0.67%	
Turnout		55,135	79.49%	
Registered electors		69,363		
INC hold		Swing		

=== 1967 ===
1967 Andhra Pradesh Legislative Assembly election: Guntur-II
Party	Candidate	Votes	%	±%
INC	Chebrolu Hanumaiah	31,936	53.43%	
CPI	Kanaparthi Nagaiah	17,877	19.91%	
Margin of victory		14,059	23.52%	
Turnout		63,219	75.32%	
Registered electors		83,932		
INC hold		Swing		

=== 1972 ===
1972 Andhra Pradesh Legislative Assembly election: Guntur-II
Party	Candidate	Votes	%	±%
Independent	Nissankara Rao Venkatarathnam	35,103	50.94%	
INC	Chebrolu Hanumaiah	32,340	46.93%	
Margin of victory		2,763	4.01%	
Turnout		70,131	64.86%	
Registered electors		108,131		
Independent gain from INC		Swing		

=== 1978 ===
1978 Andhra Pradesh Legislative Assembly election: Guntur-II
Party	Candidate	Votes	%	±%
INC(I)	Gade Veeranjaneya Sharma	26,472	43.42%	
JP	Nissankara Rao Venkatarathnam	19,607	32.16%	
Margin of victory		6,865	11.26%	
Turnout		61,975	69.44%	
Registered electors		89,254		
INC(I) gain from Independent		Swing		

=== 1983 ===
1983 Andhra Pradesh Legislative Assembly election: Guntur II
Party	Candidate	Votes	%	±%
TDP	Nissankara Rao Venkatarathnam	42,472	57.40%	
INC	Gade Veeranjaneya Sharma	12,709	17.18%	
Margin of victory		29,763	40.22%	
Turnout		75,210	66.05%	
Registered electors		113,865		
TDP gain from INC(I)		Swing		

=== 1985 ===
1985 Andhra Pradesh Legislative Assembly election: Guntur-II
Party	Candidate	Votes	%	±%
INC	Jaya Rambabu Chadalavada	36,713	48.71%	
TDP	Gade Durga Prasunamba	35,448	47.03%	
Margin of victory		1,265	1.68%	
Turnout		76,224	60.47%	
Registered electors		146,152		
INC gain from TDP		Swing		

=== 1989 ===
1989 Andhra Pradesh Legislative Assembly election: Guntur-II
Party	Candidate	Votes	%	±%
INC	Jaya Ramababu Chadalavada	58,590	60.01%	
TDP	Kilari Koteswara Rao	37,616	38.53%	
Margin of victory		20,974	21.48%	
Turnout		100,027	63.38%	
Registered electors		157,826		
INC hold		Swing		

=== 1994 ===
1994 Andhra Pradesh Legislative Assembly election: Guntur-II
Party	Candidate	Votes	%	±%
TDP	Challa Venkata Krishna Reddy	51,322	52.31%	
INC	Jaya Rambabu Chadalavada	38,554	39.30%	
Margin of victory		12,768	13.01%	
Turnout		99,456	60.02%	
Registered electors		165,701		
TDP gain from INC		Swing		

=== 1999 ===
1999 Andhra Pradesh Legislative Assembly election: Guntur-II
Party	Candidate	Votes	%	±%
TDP	Aruna Sanakkayala	55,612	52.06%	
INC	Eswara Venkata Bharathi Kosanam	49,298	46.15%	
Margin of victory		6,314	5.91%	
Turnout		108,485	56.31%	
Registered electors		200,756		
TDP gain from CPI(M)		Swing		

=== 2004 ===
2004 Andhra Pradesh Legislative Assembly election: Guntur- II
Party	Candidate	Votes	%	±%
INC	Tadisetti Venkata Rao	50,658	45.30%	
TDP	Dr. T.V. Rao	35,354	31.61%	
Margin of victory		15,304	13.68%	
Turnout		111,925	59.65%	
Registered electors		187,633		
INC gain from TDP		Swing		

== See also ==
- List of constituencies of Andhra Pradesh Legislative Assembly
- Guntur West Assembly constituency
