= Maddali Giridhar Rao =

Indian politician

Member of Andhra Pradesh Legislative Assembly
- In office May 2019 – June 2024
- Preceded by: Modugula Venugopala Reddy
- Succeeded by: Galla Madhavi
- Constituency: Guntur West

Personal details
- Born: 21 March 1976 (age 49) Guntur
- Political party: YSR Congress Party
- Parent: Maddali Subba Rao (father)
- Education: Bachelor of Commerce
- Alma mater: Acharya Nagarjuna University
- Occupation: Politician

Maddali Giridhar Rao (born 21 March 1976) is an Indian politician from Andhra Pradesh. He is an MLA of YSR Congress Party from Guntur West Assembly Constituency in Guntur district. He won the 2019 Andhra Pradesh Legislative Assembly Election.

== Early life and education ==
Rao was born in R. Agraharam, Guntur to Maddali Subba Rao. He completed his B.Com. in 1995 in a college affiliated with Acharya Nagarjuna University. He runs his own business.

== Career ==
Rao started his political career with Telugu Desam Party in 1983. In 2014, he contested from Guntur East Constituency but lost to Mohammad Musthafa Shaik of YSR Congress Party by a margin of 3,151 votes. He contested again from Guntur West Constituency and won the 2019 Andhra Pradesh Legislative Assembly Election defeating Chandragiri Yesuratnam by a margin of 4,289 votes.

A few days after meeting YSRCP chief Jagan Mohan Reddy, he wrote a letter to TDP president N. Chandrababu Naidu in January 2020, alleging a raw deal for him within the party. He also made allegations against TDP and Naidu for favouring particular community members in the party. In September 2020, he is one among the four MLAs to declare support to YSRCP. But they did not join the party formally to avoid disqualification. However, the respective parties later complained to the speaker of the Assembly. In February 2024, eight MLAs, four from TDP and four from YSRCP were disqualified by the Assembly Speaker as per the anti defection rules and Rao was one of them.
