= Bhashyam Rama Krishna =

Indian educationist and politician

Member of Parliament, Rajya Sabha
- Incumbent
- Assumed office 22 June 2026
- Preceded by: Alla Ayodhya Rami Reddy
- Constituency: Andhra Pradesh

State Vice-President, Telugu Desam Party Andhra Pradesh
- Incumbent
- Assumed office 15 April 2026
- National President: N. Chandrababu Naidu
- State President: Palla Srinivasa Rao

Personal details
- Born: Enikapadu, Amaravathi mandal, Guntur district, Andhra Pradesh (present-day Palnadu district)
- Party: Telugu Desam Party
- Spouse: Bhashyam Lakshmi Prasanna
- Parents: Bhashyam Rama Rao (father); Bhashyam Peramma (mother)
- Occupation: Educationist, entrepreneur, politician
- Known for: Founder and Chairman of Bhashyam Educational Institutions

Bhashyam Rama Krishna is an Indian educationist, entrepreneur and politician serving as a Member of Parliament in the Rajya Sabha from Andhra Pradesh. He is the founder and chairman of the Bhashyam Group of Educational Institutions. In June 2026, he was nominated by the Telugu Desam Party as its candidate for the Rajya Sabha from Andhra Pradesh. His term of office commenced on 22 June 2026.

== Early life and career ==
Bhashyam Rama Krishna was born to Bhashyam Rama Rao and Peramma in Enikapadu village, in present-day Palnadu district of Andhra Pradesh. Rama Krishna is married to Lakshmi Prasanna. They have two children, a son, Saketh Ram, and a daughter, Janani Krishna.

He began his professional career as a mathematics teacher before founding Bhashyam Educational Institutions in 1993. Over the years, the institution expanded into a network of schools and junior colleges across Andhra Pradesh, Telangana and Karnataka.

== Political career ==
Rama Krishna sought to contest the 2014, 2019, and 2024 elections as a candidate of the Telugu Desam Party, but did not receive the party's nomination. Ahead of the 2024 Indian general election, he was widely reported to be a prospective TDP candidate for the Eluru Lok Sabha constituency; however, the party ultimately did not field him due to electoral considerations.

In April 2026, Rama Krishna was appointed as a State Vice-President of the Telugu Desam Party in Andhra Pradesh.

In June 2026, the Telugu Desam Party nominated Bhashyam Rama Krishna as one of its candidates for the Rajya Sabha elections from Andhra Pradesh.

He was elected unopposed after no other candidates remained in the contest for the four Rajya Sabha seats from Andhra Pradesh. His six-year term commenced on 22 June 2026.

== Philanthropy ==
Rama Krishna has been associated with educational and charitable initiatives through the Bhashyam Group and the Bhashyam Peramma Charitable Trust. The trust has undertaken scholarship programmes, medical camps, blood donation drives and donations for disaster relief and public welfare causes.

== See also ==
- Rajya Sabha
- Telugu Desam Party
