= Guntur West Assembly constituency =

Constituency of the Andhra Pradesh Legislative Assembly, India

Coordinates: 16.29°N 80.40°E

Guntur West
- Constituency No. 94 for the Andhra Pradesh Legislative Assembly
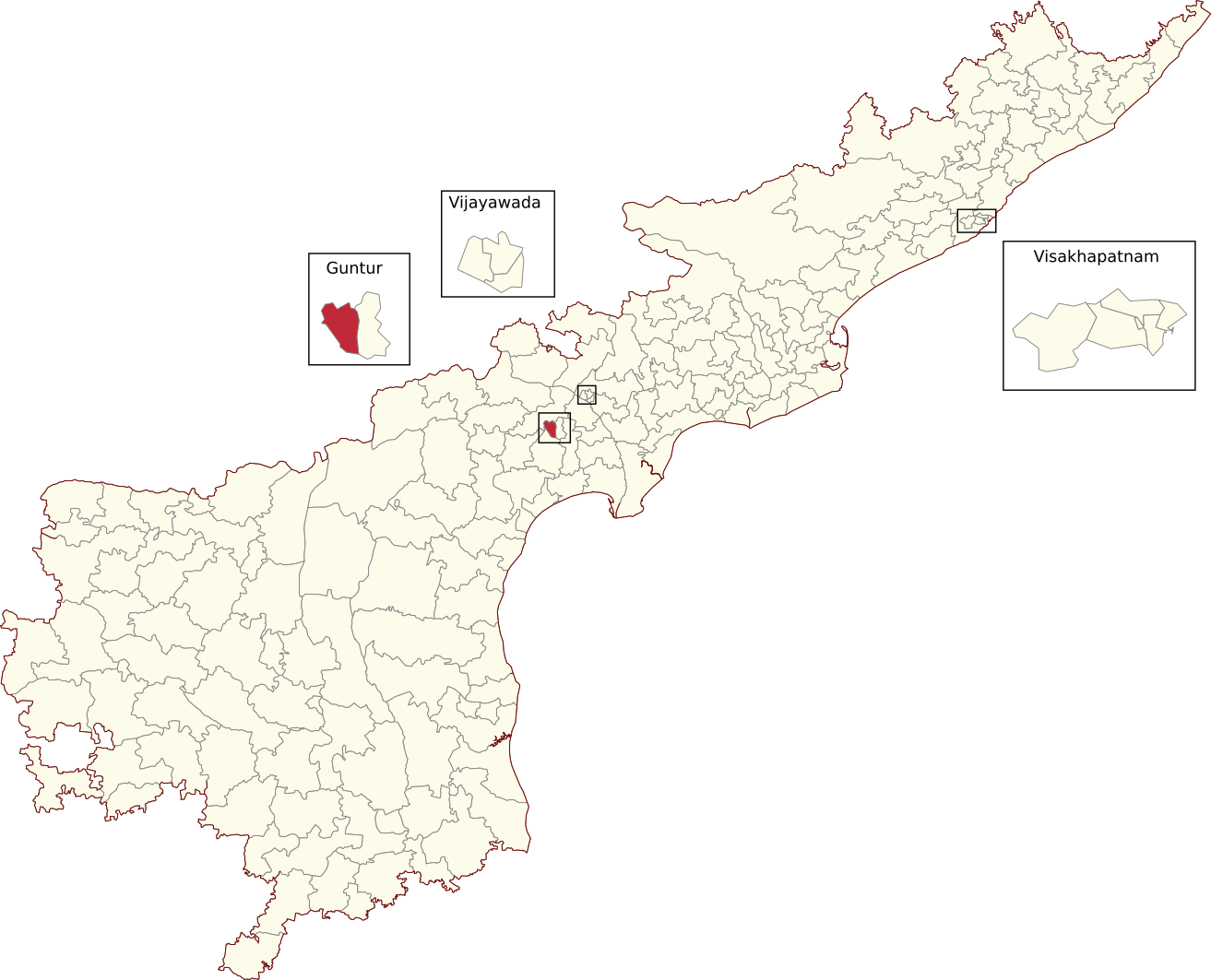
- Location of Guntur West Assembly constituency within Andhra Pradesh

Constituency details
- Country: India
- Region: South India
- State: Andhra Pradesh
- District: Guntur
- Lok Sabha constituency: Guntur
- Established: 2008
- Total electors: 2,78,320
- Reservation: None

Member of Legislative Assembly
- 16th Andhra Pradesh Legislative Assembly
- Incumbent Galla Madhavi
- Party: TDP
- Alliance: NDA
- Elected year: 2024

Guntur West is a constituency in Guntur district of Andhra Pradesh that elects representatives to the Andhra Pradesh Legislative Assembly in India. It is one of the seven assembly segments of Guntur Lok Sabha constituency.

Galla Madhavi is the current MLA of the constituency, having won the 2024 Andhra Pradesh Legislative Assembly election from Telugu Desam Party. As of 2024, there are a total of 2,78,320 electors in the constituency. The constituency was established in 2008, as per the Delimitation Orders (2008).

== Mandals ==
It covers Guntur mandal (Part), Guntur (M.Corp) (Part) and Guntur (M.Corp) – Ward No.1 to 6 and 24 to 28.

Mandal
Guntur mandal

== Members of the Legislative Assembly ==
Year	Member	Political party
2009	Kanna Lakshmi Narayana	Indian National Congress
2014	Modugula Venugopala Reddy	Telugu Desam Party
2019	Maddali Giridhar Rao	Telugu Desam Party
2024	Galla Madhavi	Telugu Desam Party

== Election results ==
=== 2024 ===
2024 Andhra Pradesh Legislative Assembly election: Guntur West
Party	Candidate	Votes	%	±%
TDP	Galla Madhavi	116,067	61.58	
YSRCP	Rajini Vidadala	64,917	34.44	
INC	John Babu Rachakonda	3,719	1.97	
NOTA	None of the above	1,055	0.56	
Majority		51,150	27.14	
Turnout		1,88,475	67.71	
Registered electors		2,78,320		
TDP hold		Swing		

=== 2019 ===
2019 Andhra Pradesh Legislative Assembly election: Guntur West
Party	Candidate	Votes	%	±%
TDP	Maddali Giridhar Rao	71,864	41.15	
YSRCP	Chandragiri Yesu Ratnam	67,575	38.69	
JSP	Dr. Thota Chandra Shekhar	27,869	15.96	
Majority		4,289	2.46	
Turnout		1,74,645	65.84	
TDP hold		Swing		

=== 2014 ===
2014 Andhra Pradesh Legislative Assembly election: Guntur West
Party	Candidate	Votes	%	±%
TDP	Modugula Venugopala Reddy	78,837	46.00	
YSRCP	Lella Appi Reddy	60,924	35.55	
Majority		17,913	10.45	
Turnout		1,71,377	66.00	
TDP gain from INC		Swing		

=== 2009 ===
2009 Andhra Pradesh Legislative Assembly election: Guntur West
Party	Candidate	Votes	%	±%
INC	Kanna Lakshminarayana	44,676	34.59	
TDP	Chukkapalli Ramesh	41,375	32.03	
PRP	Tulasi Rama Chandra Prabhu	34,004	26.32	
Majority		3,301	2.56	
Turnout		1,29,457	65.76	
INC hold		Swing		

== See also ==
- Guntur-II Assembly constituency
- List of constituencies of Andhra Pradesh Legislative Assembly
