= Thota Seetharama Lakshmi =

Indian politician (born 1951)

Member of Parliament, Rajya Sabha
- In office 10 April 2014 – 9 April 2020
- Succeeded by: Mopidevi Venkataramana
- Constituency: Andhra Pradesh

Personal details
- Born: 12 September 1951 (age 73); Uppuluru, West Godavari District
- Political party: Telugu Desam Party
- Spouse: Shri Thota Satyanarayana

Thota Sitarama Lakshmi (born 12 September 1951 in Uppuluru, West Godavari district, Andhra Pradesh) is an Indian politician from Telugu Desam Party who presently represents the party as a Member of Parliament (Rajya Sabha) from Andhra Pradesh, India.

Before her term as the Parliamentarian, she served as the Bhimavaram municipal Chairperson 2005–2010. She is also TDP District party President for West Godavari in Andhra Pradesh from 2009.

Her term as MP is from 10 April 2014 to 9 April 2020.

She has four daughters and one son.

== See also ==
- Rajya Sabha members from Andhra Pradesh
