= Chikhli =

Chikhli may refer to places in India:

- Chikhli, Maharashtra, a city and municipal council in Buldhana district, Maharashtra
- Chikhli, Gujarat, a town in Navsari district, Gujarat

== See also ==
- Chikhali (disambiguation)
