= Shyam Lal Gupta (born 1912) =

Indian publisher

- Born: November 8, 1912. Delhi
- Died: December 20, 1989.
- Occupations: Indian publisher, politician, philanthropist

Shyam Lal Gupta (born 1912), an Indian publisher, politician and philanthropist from Delhi, was the recipient of the Padma Shri, the highest civilian honor, awarded by the Government of India. He received Padma Shri in 1969 in field of Literature & Education.

He was born in 1912 in Delhi. His father's name was Shri Niranjan Lal.

He founded S. Chand & Company in 1937 with the purpose to give voice to Indian writers during colonial time, which is now transformed into S. Chand Group.

Gupta served as the member of Rajya Sabha from April 10 1972 to April 9, 1978. He was elected from Bihar. A philanthropist, he also founded the Shyam Lal Charitable Trust, and Shyam Lal College which is affiliated with the University of Delhi.

== See also ==
- List of Padma Shri award recipients (1960–1969)
- 1972 Rajya Sabha elections
