= V. Hanumantha Rao =

Indian politician

Member of Parliament, Rajya Sabha
- In office 22 June 2004 – 21 June 2016
- Preceded by: R. Ramachandraiah
- Succeeded by: D. Srinivas
- Constituency: Andhra Pradesh
- In office 3 April 1992 – 2 April 1998
- Preceded by: Kalvala Prabhakar Rao
- Succeeded by: K. Kala Venkat Rao
- Constituency: Andhra Pradesh

25th President of the Andhra Pradesh Congress Committee
- In office 1989 - 1992
- AICC President: Rajiv Gandhi; P. V. Narasimha Rao
- Preceded by: N. Janardhana Reddy
- Succeeded by: Majji Tulasi Das

Member of Legislative Assembly Andhra Pradesh
- In office 1989 - 1992
- Constituency: Amberpet
- In office 1978 - 1983
- Constituency: Amberpet

Personal details
- Born: Vuthpulla Hanumantha Rao; 16 June 1948 (age 78) Amberpet, Hyderabad, India
- Party: Indian National Congress
- Spouse: V. Chandrakala
- Children: 3 daughters
- Education: Osmania University (BA)
- Profession: Politician
- Website: Official website

V. Hanumantha Rao is a political leader from the Indian National Congress party. He is former AICC (All India Congress Committee) Secretary of Congress Party in Telangana. He was the Member of Parliament of Rajya Sabha. After Bifurcation of Andhra Pradesh he is allotted to Telangana state by draw of lots.

== Other information ==
- 2026–present:Advisor to Government Of Telangana; BC Welfare (Special Invitee To CM Revanth's cabinet Meeting)
- 2004–present:Secretary, AICC
- 2010-16: MP, Rajya Sabha elections
- 2004-10: MP, Rajya Sabha elections
- 1992-98: MP, Rajya Sabha elections
- 1989-92: MLA, Andhra Pradesh Congress Committee (Amberpet constituency )
- 1988-98: President, Andhra Pradesh Congress Committee (APCC)
- 1985-88: Joint Secretary, Andhra Pradesh Congress Committee (APCC)
- 1979-83: President, Andhra Pradesh Youth Congress
- 1978-83:MLA, Andhra Pradesh Legislative Assembly(Amberpet Assembly Constituency)

== Electoral History ==
=== Rajya Sabha ===
Position	Party	Constituency	From	To	Tenure
Member of Parliament, Rajya Sabha (1st Term)	INC(I)	Andhra Pradesh	3 April 1992	2 April 1998	5 years, 364 days
Member of Parliament, Rajya Sabha (2nd Term)	INC	Andhra Pradesh	22 June 2004	21 June 2010	5 years, 364 days
Member of Parliament, Rajya Sabha (3rd Term)	INC	Andhra Pradesh	22 June 2010	1 June 2014	3 years, 344 days
Member of Parliament, Rajya Sabha (4th Term)	INC	Telangana	2 June 2014	21 June 2016	2 years, 19 days
