= Bhagwat Karad =

Member of Parliament, Rajya Sabha (born 1956)

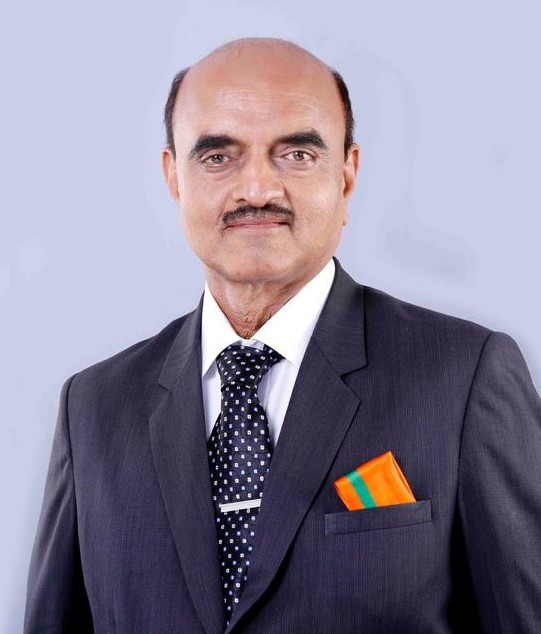
- Karad in 2020

Union Minister of State for Finance
- In office 7 July 2021 – 9 June 2024 Serving with Pankaj Choudhary
- Prime Minister: Narendra Modi
- Minister: Nirmala Sitharaman
- Preceded by: Anurag Thakur

Member of Parliament, Rajya Sabha
- In office 3 April 2020 – 2 April 2026
- Succeeded by: Ramrao Wadkute
- Constituency: Maharashtra

Mayor of Aurangabad
- In office 29 April 2005 – 4 November 2006
- Preceded by: Kishanchand Tanwani
- Succeeded by: Vijaya Rahatkar
- In office 29 April 2000 – 31 July 2001
- Preceded by: Sudam Patil Sonwane
- Succeeded by: Vikas Jain

Personal details
- Born: 16 July 1956 (age 70) Chikhali, Hyderabad State, India
- Party: Bharatiya Janata Party
- Spouse: Anjali Karad (m. 1981)
- Children: 3
- Education: MBBS; M.S. (Gen. Surgery); M.Ch. (Pediatric Surgery); F.C.P.S. (Gen. Surgery)
- Alma mater: College of Physicians & Surgeons of Mumbai, Mumbai University; Dr. Babasaheb Ambedkar Marathwada University
- Profession: Surgeon

Bhagwat Kishanrao Karad (born 16 July 1956) is an Indian politician and retired pediatric surgeon. He is a member of the Bharatiya Janata Party, and serves as a member of the Rajya Sabha from Maharashtra. He was the Mayor of Aurangabad twice. Karad became a Minister of State in the Ministry of Finance in the reshuffle of Prime Minister Modi's cabinet in the second term.

== Early life ==
Karad was born in Chikhali, Latur district, Maharashtra on 16 July 1956. His father was Kishan Rao and his mother was Gayabai Kishanrao Karad. He married Anjali on 21 December 1981 and has three sons. Karad studied at Dr. Babasaheb Ambedkar Marathwada University in Aurangabad and the College of Physicians & Surgeons of Mumbai, and holds a Master of Surgery in general surgery and a Magister Chirurgiae in pediatric surgery. He owns the Karad Hospital, a 50 bed multi-specialty hospital, in Aurangabad.

== Career ==
Karad served as the deputy mayor of the Aurangabad Municipal Corporation from 1997-1998. He served two terms as mayor of Aurangabad (2000-2001 and 2005-2006). He served as Director of REC Limited from 2018-2020. Karad was elected to the Rajya Sabha in April 2020. He became a member of the Committee on Petroleum and Natural Gas, and the Consultative Committee for the Ministry of Power and Ministry of New and Renewable Energy in June 2020. Karad was appointed as a Minister of State in the Ministry of Finance on 7 July 2021.

Karad provided emergency medical aid to a passenger suffering from vasovagal syncope while flying onboard IndiGo Flight 171 from Delhi to Mumbai on 16 November 2021. Karad, and another member of Parliament Subhash Bhamre, again provided emergency medical aid to a passenger while flying onboard Air India Flight 443 from Delhi to Aurangabad on 17 June 2022.
