= Manthena Venkata Raju =

Indian politician and social worker

- Born: May 20, 1904; Manthenavaripalem, Bapatla (taluka), British India
- Died: April 16, 1968 (aged 63)
- Political party: Indian National Congress
- Spouse: Smt. Annapurnamma

Manthena Venkata Raju (May 20, 1904 – April 16, 1968) was an Indian politician and social worker from Manthenavaripalem, Bapatla, Andhra Pradesh. He participated in the non-violent resistance against the British rule in India.

== Freedom fighter ==
In 1921, at the age of 17, Sri Manthena Venkata Raju, walked out of the National College and gave up education to participate in the Freedom Struggle of India. Since that year, he participated in several Campaigns and Satyagraha movements until India achieved Independence. He was jailed on several occasions during his participation in the Freedom Struggle. He occupied several important positions in the Andhra Congress party during this period. He served as Secretary and President of the Guntur District Congress and was the General Secretary of the Andhra Congress Party.

Among the notable leaders of Andhra Pradesh, Sri Kasu Brahmananda Reddy, Sri Alapati Venkataramaiah and Sri Venigalla Satyanarayana were all introduced to politics by Sri Manthena Venkata Raju.

In 1938, Sri Manthena Venkata Raju conducted the All India Workshop for Politics in the village of Manthenavaripalem and helped educate several leaders in the importance of politics and governance. Several leaders with Socialist-Communist lenience, within the Congress, also participated in the Workshop.

== Social worker ==
Sri Manthena Venkata Raju participated in several social causes. In 1934, he participated in a campaign to allow Harijans into temples. He helped dig many wells to provide drinking water to several villages and also encouraged people from all castes to inter mix socially. Specifically he encouraged inter-caste marriages.

He conducted widow marriages in the village of Karlapalem and also conducted several inter-caste marriages during his lifetime.

== Political leader ==
He entered the State Assembly in 1946, and was a member until 1962, barring a gap of two years. During his tenure in the State Assembly, he assumed a very important role in State Politics. During those times, Chief Ministers like, Sri Neelam Sanjeeva Reddy, Sri Gopal Reddy and Sri Sanjeevayya, were among those who sought the blessings of Sri Manthena Venkata Raju.

He always professed the principal of retirement from active politics after a certain age, like in any other salaried job; in accordance with this principle, he retired from Politics at the age of 58, in the year 1962. He believed in strong principles and was among those who lived by example.

Even without having riches or the caste equation working to his advantage, Sri Manthena Venkata Raju, established his presence in the political arena of the State of Andhra Pradesh through his disinterest in positions and his commitment to social work.

The Sri Manthena Venkata Raju Foundation was established by Champati Vijaya Ramaraju, ex-MLA of Bapatla, in his memory. The foundation does social services in Bapatla constituency and honors the accomplished 'sons and daughters' of the region.
