= N. Janardhana Reddy =

Indian politician (1935-2014)

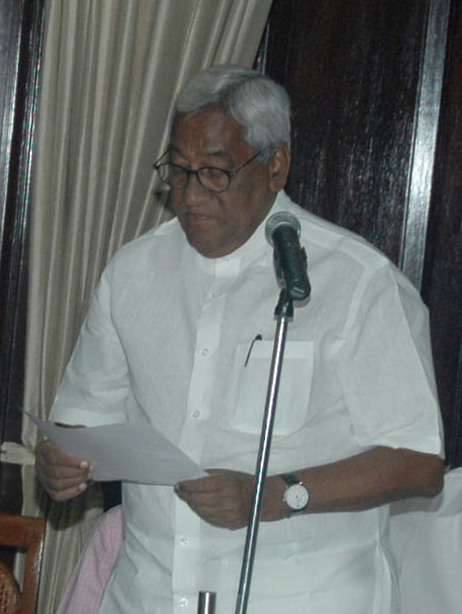
- Reddy, 2009

12th Chief Minister of Andhra Pradesh
- In office 17 December 1990 – 9 October 1992
- Governor: Krishan Kant
- Preceded by: Marri Chenna Reddy
- Succeeded by: Kotla Vijaya Bhaskara Reddy

Member of Parliament, Lok Sabha
- In office 17 May 2004 – 18 May 2009
- Preceded by: M. V. V. S. Murthy
- Succeeded by: Daggubati Purandeswari
- Constituency: Visakhapatnam
- In office 10 October 1999 – 6 February 2004
- Preceded by: Konijeti Rosaiah
- Succeeded by: Mekapati Rajamohan Reddy
- Constituency: Narasaraopet
- In office 10 March 1998 – 26 April 1999
- Preceded by: Ummareddy Venkateswarlu
- Succeeded by: Daggubati Ramanaidu
- Constituency: Bapatla

Minister of Agriculture, Command Area Development, Forests Government of Andhra Pradesh
- In office 1989–1990
- Governor: Kumudben Joshi; Krishan Kant
- Chief Minister: Marri Chenna Reddy

Member of Legislative Assembly Andhra Pradesh
- In office 1989–1994
- Preceded by: V. Bhaskara Saikrishna Yachendra
- Succeeded by: Raja VVRK. Yachendra Velugoti
- Constituency: Venkatagiri

President of the Andhra Pradesh Congress Committee
- In office 1988–1989
- AICC President: Rajiv Gandhi
- Preceded by: Jalagam Vengal Rao
- Succeeded by: V. Hanumantha Rao

Minister of Revenue, Power, Industries & Agriculture Government of Andhra Pradesh
- In office 1978–1983
- Governor: Sharada Mukherjee; K. C. Abraham; Ram Lal
- Chief Minister: Marri Chenna Reddy; Tanguturi Anjaiah; Bhavanam Venkatarami Reddy; Kotla Vijaya Bhaskara Reddy

Member of Legislative Council Andhra Pradesh
- In office 1978–1984
- Chairman: N. Venkata Subbaiah
- Leader of the House: Marri Chenna Reddy; Tanguturi Anjaiah; Bhavanam Venkatarami Reddy; Kotla Vijaya Bhaskara Reddy; N. T. Rama Rao
- Constituency: Andhra Pradesh

Member of Parliament, Rajya Sabha
- In office 2009–2014
- Preceded by: C. Ramachandraiah
- Succeeded by: V. Vijaysai Reddy
- Constituency: Andhra Pradesh
- In office 1972–1978
- Preceded by: Yasoda Reddy
- Succeeded by: Buddha Madhu Priya
- Constituency: Andhra Pradesh

Personal details
- Born: Nedurumalli Janardhana Reddy; 20 February 1935 Vakadu, Madras Presidency, British India
- Died: 9 May 2014 (aged 79) Hyderabad
- Party: Indian National Congress
- Spouse: Nedurumalli Rajyalakshmi
- Children: 4
- As of 12 May, 2006

Nedurumalli Janardhana Reddy (20 February 1935 – 9 May 2014) was an Indian politician from Andhra Pradesh. A member of the Indian National Congress, he represented the Visakhapatnam constituency in the Lok Sabha, the lower house of the Indian legislature. From 1990 to 1992, he served as 12th chief minister of Andhra Pradesh. His wife, Nedurumalli Rajyalakshmi, was a minister in the Government of Andhra Pradesh between 2004 and 2014.

In September 2007, members of the militant Naxal group attempted to assassinate Reddy and his wife; both escaped unharmed.

== Life and career ==
Janardhana Reddy was born in Vakadu, Tirupati district(Erstwhile Nellore district), Andhra Pradesh on 20 February 1935. After completing his education, he briefly worked as a teacher in a Vakadu school. He entered politics in 1972 and was elected to the Rajya Sabha. In 1978, he became the general secretary of the state congress, he was later elected to the Legislative Council. In his five-decade political career, he also served as a state minister and a legislator, He is the key person who laid foundation for development of technology park named “Sri.. Rajiv Gandhi Technology Park “ at Madhapur. Mr.Reddy worked until 1983 in Andhra Pradesh state government, serving as a minister in cabinets headed by Chief Ministers T. Anjaiah, Bhavanam Venkatram, and Kotla Vijayabhaskara Reddy. He was elected to Lok Sabha thrice, one each from the Bapatla (1998), Narsaraopet (1999) and Visakhapatnam (2004) constituencies. He represented Visakhapatnam as a congress member, and he served as President of the Andhra Pradesh Congress Committee in 1988. He joined Channa Reddy's cabinet in 1989, serving as Revenue Minister.

After Reddy quit the position of Chief Minister, Janardhan Reddy succeeded him, ascending to the Chief Ministership in 1990. Communal riots in Hyderabad presented a challenge; Reddy was credited with bringing law and order to the region in a short time. He was the first Chief Minister to ban the militant Naxalite People's War Group. One important decision during his career was the privatization of professional education. Many medical and engineering colleges in the private sector were permitted to operate during his tenure. Kotla Vijayabhaskara Reddy succeeded him as Chief Minister in October 1992. Members of the Naxalite extremist group, which Reddy had earlier outlawed, attempted to assassinate him on 7 September 2007. The attempt occurred while he was travelling with his family to his home village of Vakadu. Although three of his followers died in the incident, Reddy and his wife escaped unharmed. Reddy was elected to the Rajya Sabha again in 2010, where he served until his death. In his final years, Reddy suffered from a liver ailment and Parkinson's disease. He died in 2014 after prolonged illness, survived by his wife Rajyalaxmi and his four sons.

== Political history ==
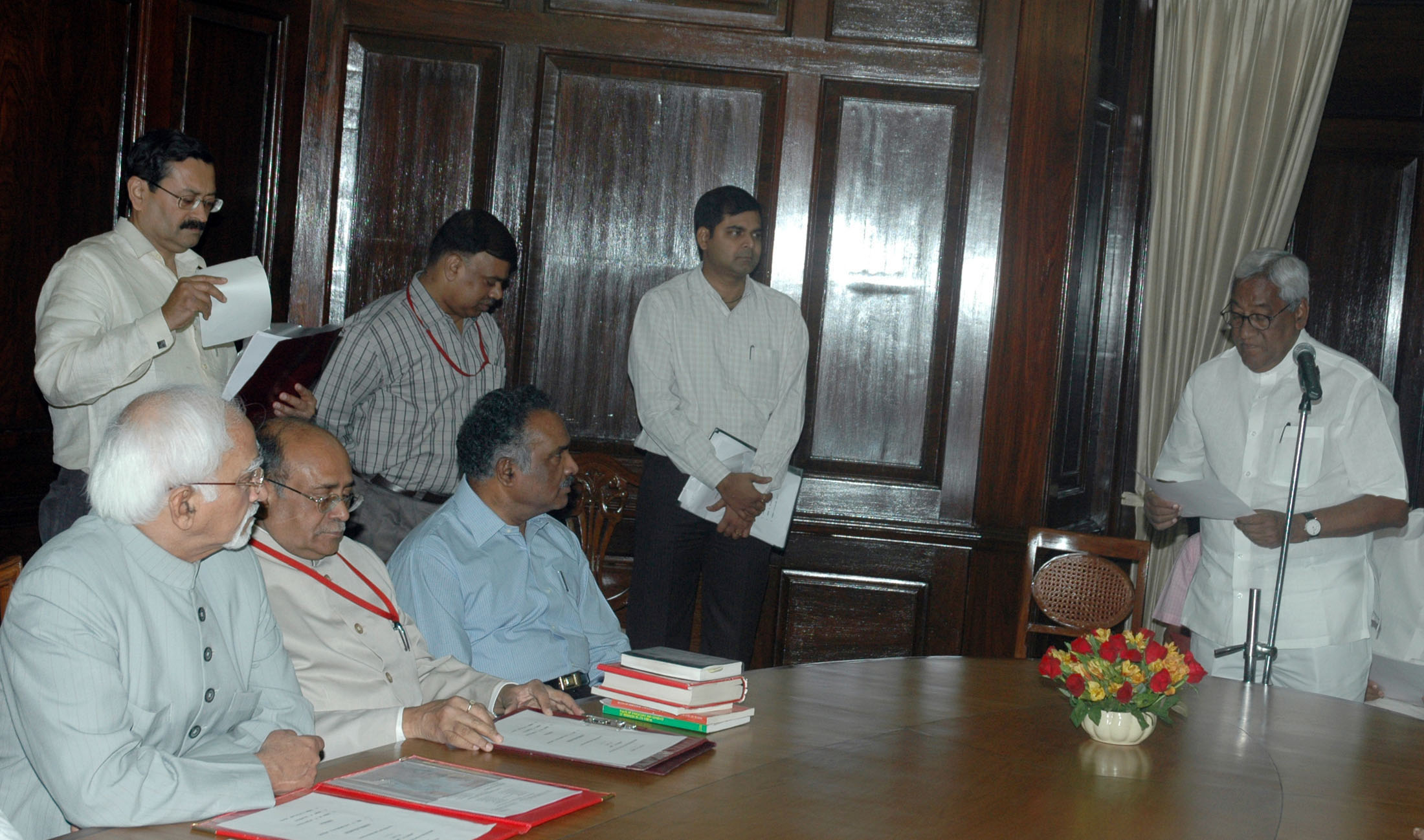
The chairman, Rajya Sabha and Vice President, Shri Mohd. Hamid Ansari administering the oath of office to Dr. N. Janardhana Reddy a newly elected Member of Rajya Sabha from Andhra Pradesh, in New Delhi on April 27, 2009

- 1972–1978 : Member of Rajya sabha.
- 1978–1984 : MLC.
- 1978–1983 : Cabinet Minister for Revenue, Industries, Power and Agriculture Departments in the Government of Andhra Pradesh.
- 1988–1989 : P.C.C. President.
- 1989–1994 : MLA of Venkatagiri (Assembly constituency).
- 1989–1990 : Cabinet Minister for Agriculture, Forests and Higher Education Departments in the Government of Andhra Pradesh.
- 1990–1992 : Chief Minister of Andhra Pradesh.
- 1998–1999 : MP (Bapatla – 12th Lok Sabha).
- 1999–2004 : MP (Narasaraopet – 13th Lok Sabha – 2nd term).
- 2004–2009 : MP (Visakhapatnam – 14th Lok Sabha – 3rd term).
- 2009 : Elected to Rajya Sabha.
- 2010 : Re-elected to Rajya Sabha.

== See also ==
- List of chief ministers of Andhra Pradesh
- Government of Andhra Pradesh
- Politics of Andhra Pradesh
