= Alla Ayodhya Rami Reddy =

Indian politician

Member of Parliament, Rajya Sabha
- In office 22 June 2020 – 21 June 2026
- Preceded by: T. G. Venkatesh
- Succeeded by: Bhashyam Rama Krishna
- Constituency: Andhra Pradesh

Personal details
- Born: 12 August 1964 (age 61) Pedakakani, Guntur district
- Party: YSR Congress Party
- Spouse: Alla Dakshayani
- Parents: Alla Dasaratha Rami Reddy (father); Alla Veera Raghavamma (mother)
- Relatives: Alla Ramakrishna Reddy (brother); Kallam Satish Reddy (brother-in-law); Modugula Venugopala Reddy (brother-in-law)
- Occupation: Politician, Industrialist

Alla Ayodhya Rami Reddy is an Indian politician. He was elected to the Rajya Sabha, upper house of the Parliament of India from Andhra Pradesh in the 2020 Rajyasabha elections as a member of the YSR Congress Party.

== Personal life ==
Alla Ayodhya Rami Reddy hailed from Guntur district. Born on August 12, 1964, in Pedakakani to Alla Dasaratha Rami Reddy and Veera Raghavamma. Mangalagiri MLA Alla Rama Krishna Reddy is his brother.

He completed his primary education at Pedakakani in Guntur district. He studied in Bapuji High School in Guntur city up to the tenth class. He studied Intermediate in Reddy College in Narasaraopet in Guntur district.

He completed B Tech (civil) at KLS Gogte Institute of Technology, Belagavi, Karnataka and M Tech (Civil) at Osmania University in Hyderabad. He started his career as a civil engineer in 1984. He is married to Alla Dakshayani.

== Business career ==
He Founded Ramky Group of Companies, having a net worth of US$350 Million he is the second richest Rajya sabha member in the Indian Parliament.

== Political career ==
Alla Ayodhya Rami Reddy joined YSR Congress Party in February 2014 and campaigned for election to Parliament in the 2014 General Election from Narasaraopet. He lost to Rayapati Sambasiva Rao of Telugu Desam Party.

In 2020 May he was elected as a Member of the Rajya Sabha from the YSR Congress Party.
