= Enikapadu =

- Village
- Interactive map of Enikapadu
- Location in Andhra Pradesh, India
- Coordinates: 16.5168°N 80.3613°E
- Country: India
- State: Andhra Pradesh
- District: Palnadu
- Mandal: Amaravathi

Languages
  - Official: Telugu
- Time zone: UTC+5:30 (IST)
- Area code: +91–8640
- Vehicle registration: AP

Enikapadu is a village in Palnadu district of the Indian state of Andhra Pradesh. It is located in Amaravathi mandal of Guntur revenue division.
