= Mudumala Henry Samuel =

Indian politician (1912–1972)

Member of Parliament (Rajya Sabha)
- In office 1957–1964, 1968–1972
- Constituency: Andhra Pradesh

Personal details
- Born: 21 June 1912 Kalasapad, Kadapa, Madras Presidency, British India
- Died: 13 March 1972 (aged 59)
- Party: Indian National Congress

Mudumala Henry Samuel (1912–1972) was an Indian politician. He was a member of the Rajya Sabha, the upper house of the Parliament of India representing Andhra Pradesh as a member of the Indian National Congress for three terms.
