= Yasoda Reddy =

Indian politician

Yashoda Reddy (5 August 1925 – 18 February 1983) was an Indian politician from Indian State of Andhra Pradesh. She was member of 3rd Lok Sabha from Kurnool during 1962–1967.

She was a member of the Rajya Sabha from Andhra Pradesh during 1956–1962 and 1967–1972.
