= Chikhali, Rajasthan =

Chikhali Chikhli, Cheekhli
- Town
- Location in Rajasthan, India Chikhali (India)
- Coordinates: 23°25′49″N 73°57′15″E
- Country: India
- State: Rajasthan
- District: Dungarpur
- Tehsil: chikhali

Population (2011)
  - Total: 3,373

Languages
  - Official: Hindi
- Time zone: UTC+5:30 (IST)
- PIN: 314030

There is another village named Cheekhli in Kotra Tehsil, Udaipur District, Rajasthan.

Chikhali (Cheekhli) is a panchayat village in the Vaagar area of Rajasthan, India. It is located near the Mahi River. Administratively it is under chikhali Tehsil in Dungarpur District, Rajasthan.

There are three villages in the Chikhali gram panchayat: Chikhali, Medi Temba and Mali.
