= Sana Sathish =

Indian politician and industialist

Sana Sathish Babu

Member of Parliament, Rajya Sabha
- In office 13 December 2024 – 22 June 2026
- Preceded by: Mopidevi Venkata Ramana Rao
- Constituency: Andhra Pradesh.

Personal details
- Born: 19 August 1972 (age 54) East Godavari, Andhra Pradesh, India
- Party: Telugu Desam Party
- Education: Diploma in E.C.E (2001)
- Occupation: Politician
- Profession: Cricket administrator; Industrialist
- Website: Personal website

Sana Sathish Babu (born 19 August 1972) is an Indian politician, industrialist, Sports administrator and philanthropist primarily based in Andhra region. A member of Telugu Desam Party, he has been serving as a member of Rajya Sabha from Andhra Pradesh since 2024. He is the founder of the Sana Sathish Babu Foundation. In October 2025, he has been nominated as Member to BCCI Infrastructure Development Committee.

== Early life and career ==
Sathish was born in Andhra Pradesh and spent his childhood in Kakinada. He completed his diploma on Electronics and Communication Engineering in 2001. He worked for almost a decade as an employee at state electricity department after his father died. After quitting the job, he left for Hyderabad and started business.

Sathish Babu is currently serving as Honorary Secretary to the Andhra Cricket Association and has also held important positions in the Andhra Cricket Association, BCCI, East Godavari District Cricket Association and others.

== Political career ==
Sathish joined Telugu Desam Party and became a key member of the party’s core team. He was elected as Rajya Sabha member in 2024 bye election seat from Andhra Pradesh. Soon after, he was appointed as floor leader of Telugu Desam Party Party in Rajya Sabha.

== Elections Contested ==
=== Rajya Sabha ===
Source
Position	Party	Constituency	From	To	Tenure
Member of Parliament, Rajya Sabha (1st Term)	TDP	Andhra Pradesh	13 December 2024	21 June 2026	1 year, 190 days
Member of Parliament, Rajya Sabha (2nd Term)	TDP	Andhra Pradesh	22 June 2026	Incumbent	153 days

== Controversy ==
He has been implicated in ED cases by politically motivated interests
