= Mansoor Ali Khan (Karnataka politician) =

Indian politician

Mansoor Ali Khan is an Indian politician from Karnataka who is serving as the Member of the Rajyabha from Karnataka since June 2026. He is associated with the Indian National Congress, a national political party. He is also serving as the Secretary in-charge of All India Congress Committee of Kerala and Lakshadweep. He is son of K. Rahman Khan, former Deputy Chairman of Rajya Sabha.
