= Lingamaneni Ramesh =

Indian politician

Member of Parliament, Rajya Sabha
- Incumbent
- Assumed office 22 June 2026
- Preceded by: Parimal nathwani
- Constituency: Andhra Pradesh

Personal details
- Born: 1973 (age 52–53) Vijayawada,NTR district Andhra Pradesh,India
- Party: Janasena Party
- Education: Madurai Kamaraj University (M.A. Discontinued)
- Occupation: Politician,Businessman

Lingamaneni Ramesh is an Indian politician from the Janasena Party. He is a Member of Parliament, representing Andhra Pradesh in the Rajya Sabha, the upper house of India's Parliament since June 2026.
