= Santrupt Misra =

Indian politician

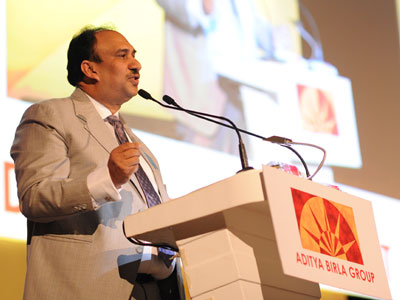
- Santrupt Misra in 2014

MP of Rajya Sabha for Odisha
- Incumbent
- Assumed office 03 April 2026

Personal details
- Born: 15 August 1965 (age 61) Burla, Sambalpur, Odisha
- Party: Biju Janata Dal
- Education: Ravenshaw College; Utkal University; Tata Institute of Social Sciences
- Occupation: Corporate Executive; Politician

Santrupt Misra is an Indian politician and member of Rajya Sabha from Odisha, India. In 2024, he joined politics after taking a voluntary retirement from the Aditya Birla Group. He is active in politics with Biju Janata Dal party.

== Early life and education ==
Misra was born on 15 August 1965 in Burla, Odisha. to Prof. Biswamohan Mishra and Sarajubala Mishra. He is a native of Puri district of Odisha. He finished his school education from Cuttack and then joined Ravenshaw College and did his master's degree in political science from Utkal University.

== Career ==
In 1994, he joined Hindustan Unilever and in 1996, he joined Aditya Birla Group. Till 2024 he worked in Aditya Birla Group and took volunteer retirement and joined politics. Apart from that, he worked as a director in Carbon Black.

== Political career ==
He joined Biju Janata Dal in 2024 during the 2024 Indian general election. He is working as the National Spokesperson of BJD. In 2024 Indian general election, he lost to Bhartrtuhari Mahtab of BJP from the Cuttack Lok Sabha constituency.

In 2026, he elected to Rajya Sabha from Odisha as a candidate of Biju Janata Dal.
