= V. C. Kesava Rao =

Indian politician

Member of Parliament, Rajya Sabha
- In office 1962-1967 ,1974-1986
- Constituency: Andhra Pradesh

Personal details
- Born: 24 May 1917
- Died: 1995
- Party: Indian National Congress

V. C. Kesava Rao was an Indian politician. He was a Member of Parliament representing Andhra Pradesh in the Rajya Sabha the upper house of India's Parliament as member of the Indian National Congress.
