= Narreddy Tulasi Reddy =

Indian politician

Dr Narreddy Thulasi Reddy, M.B.B.S

Former Member of Rajyasabha (1988/1994), Zilla Parishad Chairman, Kadapa (1995/2000), 20 Point Programme Chairman (2011/2014)
- Constituency: Pulivendula

Personal details
- Born: 1 August 1951 (age 74) Gaddam Vari Palle, Kadapa Dt., Andhra Pradesh, India
- Party: Indian National Congress
- Spouse: Narreddy Alamelu
- Children: 2

Narreddy Tulasi Reddy is an Indian politician. He is Chairman of 20 Point Program Committee. He belongs to Indian National Congress.
