= Manthenavaripalem =

- village
- Interactive map of Manthenavaripalem
- Location in Andhra Pradesh, India Manthenavaripalem (India)
- Coordinates: 15.987673°N 80.652673°E
- Country: India
- State: Andhra Pradesh
- District: Bapatla

Languages
  - Official: Telugu · Hindi · English
- Time zone: UTC+5:30 (IST)
- PIN: 522311
- Telephone code: 918643
- Vehicle registration: AP

Manthenavaripalem is a village in Bapatla district in the state of Andhra Pradesh in India.

Famous people from this village:

- Sri Manthena Venkata Raju (1904-1968) - Freedom fighter
