= Chikhali, Ratnagiri district =

Village in Maharashtra, India

Chikhali
- village
- Location in Maharashtra, India Chikhali (India)
- Coordinates: 17.25°N 73.58°E
- Country: India
- State: Maharashtra
- District: Ratnagiri district

Languages
  - Official: Marathi
- Time zone: UTC+5:30 (IST)
- PIN: Chikhali
- ISO 3166 code: IN-MH
- Nearest city: Chiplun, Ratnagiri, Karad, Satara

Chikhali is a village in the Sangameshwar taluka of Ratnagiri district in Maharashtra State, India. Chikhli is other variation for the same name.

== Transportation ==
Sangameshwar railway station is the closest railway station to Chikhali. Ratnagiri railway station is the railway station reachable from nearby towns.

Ratnagiri and Chiplun are the nearest towns to Chikhali which have road connectivity.
