= Osman Sobani =

Indian politician

Osman Sobhani

Member of Parliament, Rajya Sabha
- In office 1952-1954
- Constituency: Andhra Pradesh

Personal details
- Born: 8 December 1895
- Died: 9 February 1959 (aged 63)
- Party: Indian National Congress
- Spouse: Khatija

Osman Sobhani was an Indian politician . He was a Member of Parliament, representing Andhra Pradesh in the Rajya Sabha the upper house of India's Parliament as a member of the Indian National Congress.
