= Yelamanchili Sivaji =

Indian politician

Member of Parliament, Rajya Sabha
- In office 1988-1994
- Constituency: Andhra Pradesh

Personal details
- Born: 28 July 1947 (age 78)
- Party: Telugu Desam
- Spouse: Hema

Yelamanchili Sivaji is an Indian politician . He was a Member of Parliament, representing Andhra Pradesh in the Rajya Sabha the upper house of India's Parliament as a member of the Telugu Desam.
