= Ramrao Wadkute =

Indian politician (1954–2026)

Member of Parliament, Rajya Sabha
- In office 3 April 2026 – 22 November 2026
- Preceded by: Bhagwat Karad
- Constituency: Maharashtra

Member of Maharashtra Legislative Council
- In office 10 June 2014 – 14 October 2019
- Constituency: Nominated

Chairman of Sheep and Goat Development Corporation, Pune (Minister of State Status)
- In office 2001–2004, 2012–2014

Personal details
- Born: 1 July 1954 Babhulgaon, Parbhani District, Hyderabad State, India
- Died: 22 November 2026 (aged 72) Delhi, India
- Party: Bharatiya Janata Party (2019–2026)
- Other political affiliations: Nationalist Congress Party (before 2019)
- Spouse: Indumati Ramrao Wadkute
- Children: 3
- Occupation: Political and social worker

Ramrao Sakharam Wadkute (1 July 1954 – 22 November 2026) was an Indian politician from Maharashtra. He was elected to the Rajya Sabha from Maharashtra as a member of the Bharatiya Janata Party.

== Death ==
He died on 22 November 2026 due to a heart attack.
