= Jesudasu Seelam =

Indian politician

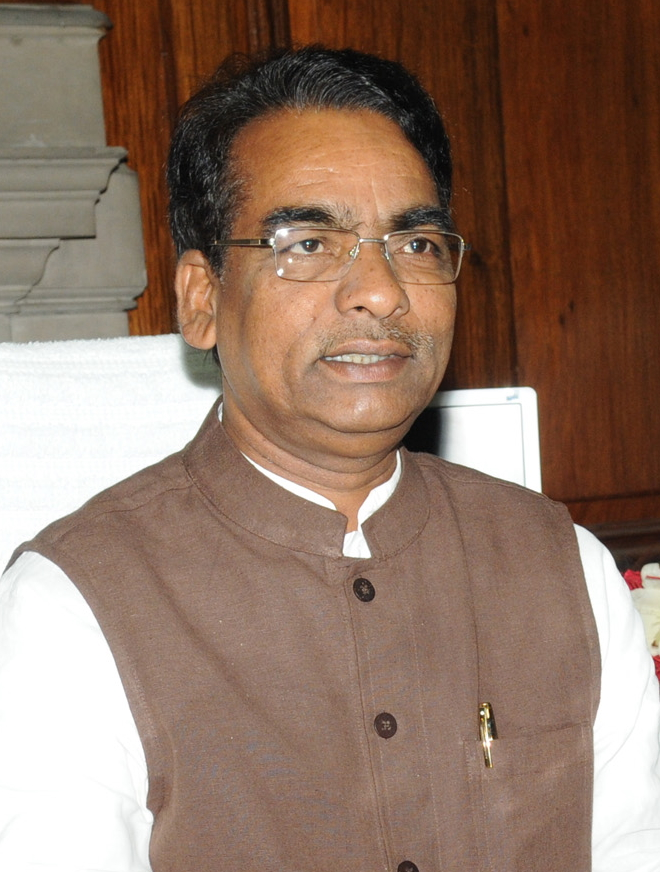

Minister of State for Finance Government of India
- In office 17 June 2013 – 26 May 2014
- Prime Minister: Manmohan Singh
- Preceded by: S. S. Palanimanickam
- Succeeded by: Nirmala Sitaraman

Member of Parliament Rajya Sabha
- In office 22 June 2004 – 21 June 2016
- Succeeded by: V. Vijaysai Reddy, YSRCP
- Constituency: Andhra Pradesh

Personal details
- Born: 13 August 1953 (age 72) Pusuluru, Guntur district. Andhra Pradesh
- Party: Indian National Congress
- Spouse: Smt. Sujatha Seelam
- Children: 2 daughters & 1 son (Mourya)
- Education: B.Sc., - Andhra Christian College, Guntur, Andhra Pradesh (1971-74) M.Sc., (Chemistry) - Andhra University, Visakhapatnam (1975 -77)
- As of May, 2014 Source: [dead link http://finmin.nic.in/the_ministry/ministerofstate/mosprofile.asp[dead link]]

Jesudasu Seelam is an Indian politician from Indian National Congress party, who was the Member of Parliament representing Andhra Pradesh in the Rajya Sabha, the upper house of the Parliament from 2004 till 2016. He was Minister of State (Revenue) under the Ministry of Finance from 17 June 2013. Prior to entering politics he served as an Indian Administrative Service (IAS) officer from 1984 to 1999 of Karnataka cadre.

== Election History ==
=== Rajya Sabha ===
Position	Party	Constituency	From	To	Tenure
Member of Parliament, Rajya Sabha (1st Term)	INC	Andhra Pradesh	22 June 2004	21 June 2010	5 years, 364 days
Member of Parliament, Rajya Sabha (2nd Term)	INC	Andhra Pradesh	22 June 2010	21 June 2016	5 years, 365 days
