= C. Ramachandraiah =

Indian politician and accountant

Chennamsetty Ramachandraiah

Member of Legislative Council Andhra Pradesh
- Incumbent
- Assumed office 30 March 2021
- Chairman: Shariff Mohammed Ahmed; Koyye Moshenu Raju
- Leader of the House: Y. S. Jagan Mohan Reddy
- Constituency: Elected by MLAs
- In office 18 March 2011 – 29 March 2017
- Chairman: A. Chakrapani
- Leader of the House: Kiran Kumar Reddy; N. Chandrababu Naidu
- Constituency: Elected by MLAs

Minister of Endowments Government of Andhra Pradesh
- In office 18 January 2012 – 21 February 2014
- Governor: E. S. L. Narasimhan
- Chief Minister: Kiran Kumar Reddy
- Succeeded by: Pydikondala Manikyala Rao

Member of Parliament, Rajya Sabha
- In office 3 April 1998 – 2 April 2008
- Preceded by: S. Jaipal Reddy
- Succeeded by: N. Janardhana Reddy
- Constituency: Andhra Pradesh

Minister of Endowments Government of Andhra Pradesh
- In office 1985 - 1989
- Governor: Shankar Dayal Sharma
- Chief Minister: N. T. Rama Rao
- Preceded by: Eli Anjaneyulu

Member of Legislative Assembly Andhra Pradesh
- In office 1985–1989
- Preceded by: S Rama Muni Reddy
- Succeeded by: K Sivananda Reddy
- Constituency: Kadapa

Personal details
- Born: Cuddapah
- Party: Telugu Desam Party (1982-2008) (2024-present)
- Other political affiliations: Indian National Congress (2011-2018); Praja Rajyam Party (2008-2011); YSR Congress Party (2018-2024)
- Spouse: C. Kasturi Bai

Chennamsetty Ramachandraiah is a politician of the Telugu Desam Party and Chartered Accountant by profession. He was a Member of the Legislative Council and a minister of endowments in the state cabinet of Andhra Pradesh. He was the Opposition leader of the Andhra Pradesh Legislative council. He is from Rajampeta, Kadapa district, Andhra Pradesh.

A chartered accountant by profession, Ramchandraiah was a bank employee before entering politics in 1981.

== Political career ==
He was elected to the Andhra Pradesh Legislative Assembly in 1985 and served as a minister in the state cabinet in 1986–88. He was also a member of the Rajya Sabha for two terms. He held many positions in the Telugu Desam Party (TDP), including as a member of its politburo. He quit TDP citing difference with Chandrababu Naidu in 2008. He joined Chiranjeevi's Praja Rajyam Party in 2008.

After the PRP merged with the Indian National Congress, Ramachandraiah was elected as MLC in Congress Party. On 19 January 2012 he also got Endowments ministry. This is his second time of being in state ministry cabinets.

He quits Congress and later joined YSRCP in 2018. He got elected as MLC in 2021.

C Ramachandraiah on 3 December 2023 resigned to YSRCP and joined Telugu Desam Party in the presence of party chief N Chandrababu Naidu.

== Election History ==
=== Rajya Sabha ===
Position	Party	Constituency	From	To	Tenure
Member of Parliament, Rajya Sabha (1st Term)	TDP	Andhra Pradesh	3 April 1998	2 April 2004	5 years, 365 days
Member of Parliament, Rajya Sabha (2nd Term)	TDP	Andhra Pradesh	22 June 2004	22 January 2009	4 years, 214 days
