= Mary Naidu =

Indian politician

Member of Parliament, Rajya Sabha
- In office 1964–1970
- Constituency: Andhra Pradesh

Personal details
- Born: 28 August 1910
- Party: Indian National Congress

M. L. Mary Naidu was an Indian politician. She was a Member of Parliament, representing Andhra Pradesh in the Rajya Sabha the upper house of India's Parliament as a member of the Indian National Congress.
