= Savita Behen =

Indian politician

- Born: 23 January 1919; Kala Gujran, Jhelum district, Punjab, British India
- Died: 10 March 2009 (aged 90); New Delhi, India
- Occupations: Social worker, Politician & Educationist
- Known for: Women empowerment
- Awards: Padma Shri

Savita Behen (23 January 1919 – 10 March 2009) was an Indian politician, social worker, educationist and a former member of Rajya Sabha, the upper house of the bicameral Indian Parliament. She was known to be an advocate of women empowerment and gender equality and was listed among the 3300 distinguished living women of the world by the Council for Parity Democracy in 1990. She was honoured by the Government of India in 1971 with Padma Shri, the fourth highest Indian civilian award.

== Early life & education ==
Savita Behen was born in a Punjabi Hindu family on 23 January 1919 at Kala Gujran in Jhelum district in the erstwhile British India, presently in Pakistan. She did her college studies at the Government College, Lahore and P. L. College, Shimla. Joining the Indian freedom struggle at a young age, she became active in social work. She founded Women Sevika Dal in 1944 and later, established Harijan Adult Education Centre and Tailoring and Industrial Centres for women in Delhi. She also founded three schools for harijan and dalit children.

== Work ==
Savita Behen was the chairman of the Refugee Widow Protection Committee and was instrumental in the establishment of two industrial and education centres for the refugee women. She held the presidency of the All India Women's Council, the Women's Welfare Association of Delhi and the Super Bazar Cooperative Stores Limited, New Delhi and was the first woman vice president of the Delhi Municipal Committee, a post she held from 1956 to 1957. She served the Punjab Legislative Council, the predecessor of the Punjab Legislative Assembly from 1962 to 1966. She was elected to the Rajya Sabha, the upper house of the Indian Parliament in 1972, representing Delhi and served the house till 1978. She was one of the 15 nominated members of the Joint Committee of Indian Parliament set up by Indian parliament for the establishment of the Central Council of Homoeopathy.

Savita Behen was the zonal coordinator for Business and Industry Wing of the Rajyoga Education and Research Foundation of the Brahma Kumaris World Spiritual University for the region of Warangal in Andhra Pradesh. She was awarded the civilian honour of Padma Shri in 1971 by the Government of India. The Council for Parity Democracy listed her among 3300 distinguished living women in 1990. She died on 10 March 2009 at the age of 90.

== See also ==
- Gender equality
