= Meda Raghunadha Reddy =

Indian businessman and politician (born 1965)

Member of Parliament, Rajya Sabha
- Incumbent
- Assumed office 3 April 2024
- Preceded by: C. M. Ramesh
- Constituency: Andhra Pradesh

Personal details
- Born: 1965 (age 60–61) Chinnaiahgaripalli, Nandalur Mandal, Kadapa District, Andhra Pradesh
- Relations: Meda Venkata Mallikarjuna Reddy (brother)

Meda Raghunadha Reddy is an Indian businessman and politician from Andhra Pradesh. On 8 February 2024, the YSRCP announced him as their Rajya Sabha candidate from Andhra Pradesh, he was subsequently elected to Rajya Sabha.

== Early life ==
Meda Raghunadha Reddy was born in 1965 to Meda Ramakrishna Reddy and Lakshminarasamma in the village of Chennaiyyagaripalle in Nandaluru Mandal, Kadapa district, Andhra Pradesh. He completed his degree in Tanguturu.
