= Chadalavada Venkatrao =

Indian politician

Chadalavada Venkatarao

Member of Parliament, Rajya Sabha
- In office 1978-1981
- Constituency: Andhra Pradesh

Personal details
- Born: 11 March 1931
- Died: 16 February 1981 (aged 49)
- Party: Indian National Congress

Chadalavada Venkatarao was an Indian politician. He was a Member of Parliament, representing Andhra Pradesh in the Rajya Sabha the upper house of India's Parliament as a member of the Indian National Congress.
