= Chikhali, Latur district =

Chikhali
- Village
- Country: India
- State: Maharashtra
- District: Latur
- Taluka: Ahmedpur
- Lok Sabha constituency: Latur
- Assembly constituency: Ahmedpur

Government
  - Type: Panchayati raj
  - Body: Gram panchayat
  - MP: Sudhakar Tukaram Shrangare (BJP)
  - MLA: Babasaheb Mohanrao Patil

Area
  - Total: 1,263 ha (3,120 acres)

Population (2011 Census)
  - Total: 3,538
  - Males: 1,835
  - Females: 1,703
- Time zone: UTC+5:30 (IST)
- PIN: 413 523

Chikhali is a village in Ahmedpur taluka of Latur district, Maharashtra.
