= Nuthalapati Joseph =

Indian politician

Member of Parliament, Rajya Sabha
- In office 1972–1974
- Constituency: Andhra Pradesh

Personal details
- Died: 1992
- Party: Indian National Congress
- Spouse: Leizziemma

Nuthalapati Joseph was an Indian politician. He was a Member of Parliament, representing Andhra Pradesh in the Rajya Sabha the upper house of India's Parliament as a member of the Indian National Congress.
