= V. Vijayasai Reddy =

Indian former politician (born 1957)

- Venumbaka Vijayasai Reddy
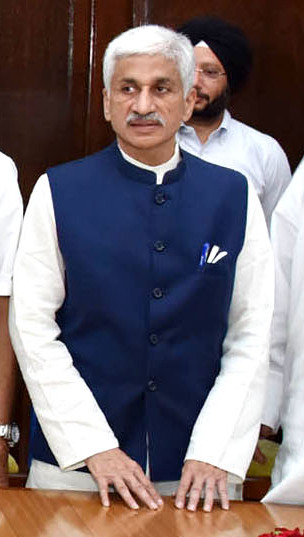

Member of Parliament, Rajya Sabha
- In office 22 June 2016 – 25 January 2025
- Preceded by: Jesudasu Seelam, INC
- Succeeded by: P. Venkata Satyanarayana
- Constituency: Andhra Pradesh

Personal details
- Born: Venumbaka Vijayasai Reddy; 1 July 1957 (age 69) Nellore, Andhra Pradesh, India
- Party: YSR Congress Party (2011-2025), Parivartan Rajniti Party (2026)
- Spouse: V. Sunanda Reddy (m. 1986)
- Children: 1
- Occupation: Politician
- Profession: Chartered accountant

Venumbaka Vijayasai Reddy (born 1 July 1957) is an Indian politician who served as a Member of Parliament in Rajya Sabha representing Andhra Pradesh from 2016 to 2025. He also served as Chairperson of the Parliamentary Standing Committee on Transport, Tourism and Culture and the National General Secretary of YSR Congress Party. Reddy is a Chartered Accountant by profession.

He has been an aide to two former Chief Ministers of Andhra Pradesh: Y.S. Rajashekhara Reddy and Y.S. Jaganmohan Reddy, and was a founding and senior member of the YSR Congress Party. During his membership of the party, he was widely considered the second-in-charge leader. In August 2026, he announced a new political party in Andhra Pradesh, a year and a half after he resigned from his long- term Rajya Sabha seat and left the YSRCP.

== Life and work ==
Venumbaka Vijayasai Reddy was born on 1 July 1957 in Tallapudi in the Nellore district of Andhra Pradesh to an agricultural family.

He completed his chartered accountancy in Chennai and practised for over 22 years. He is the senior most Partner in M/s. V S Reddy SP & Associates with offices in Chennai, Bangalore, Hyderabad, and other cities of Tamil Nadu.

Sai Reddy is married to Sunanda Reddy, and has a daughter named Penaka Neha Reddy, married to P Rohit Reddy, brother of Aurobindo Pharma Managing Director Sarath Chandra Reddy.

Sai Reddy served as Member of Board of Trustees of Tirumala Tirupati Devasthanams, Tirupati, for two consecutive Terms (GO Rt No. 1221 dated 08.2006). He also served on the board of several state government undertakings in addition to a stint as the Director of the Oriental Bank of Commerce.

Vijayasai was also financial advisor of several companies including Jagan's Group of companies and was the family auditor of former Andhra Pradesh Chief Minister late Y S Rajasekhara Reddy.

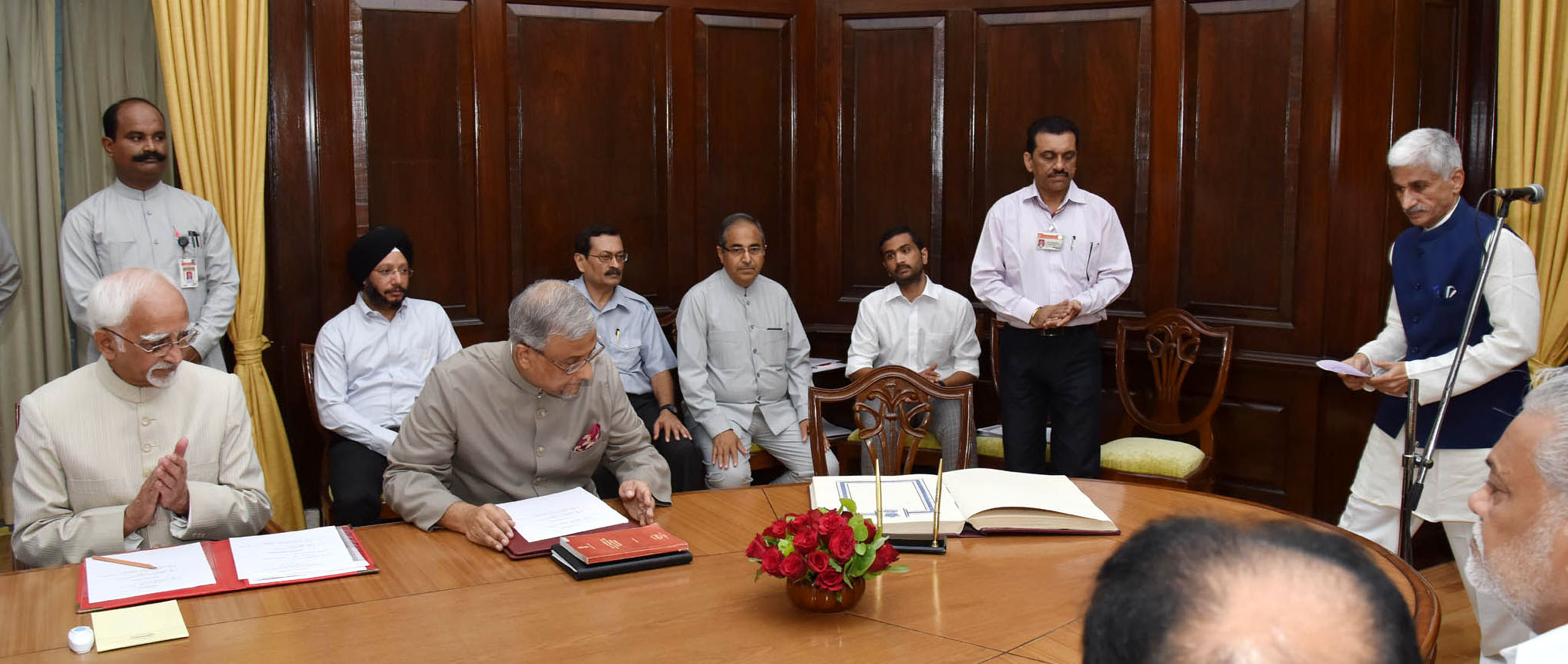
V. Vijayasai Reddy taking the oath administered by Shri M. Hamid Ansari in 2016

== Member of Parliament ==
In June 2016, he was the candidate for the Rajya Sabha seat from Andhra Pradesh and was elected unopposed. In 2023, he was renominated to the Rajya Sabha by the YSRC Parliamentary Party for a second term.

He has been as the longest serving Parliamentary Party leader for the YSR Congress Party from 2016 to 2024, a total period of 8 consecutive years. He is currently the Parliamentary Party leader in Rajya Sabha.

Until 2022, he was the Chairman of the Parliamentary Standing Committee on Commerce. He has served as the Chairman of the Parliamentary Standing Committee on Transport, Tourism and Culture from 2022 to 2023 and 2023-2024. He has been thrice nominated for the Panel of Vice-Chairpersons and chaired the Rajya Sabha on numerous occasions, Rajya Sabha and is a Member of the Business Advisory Committee, Rajya Sabha.

He has introduced 30 Private Member Bills in the Parliament.

== Electoral performance ==
Reddy expressed interest in contesting a direct election from the Venkatagiri Assembly Constituency when he joined politics. However, Jagan Mohan Reddy nominated him to the Rajya Sabha as an MP. He was also appointed as the Lok Sabha in-charge for the Nellore Parliamentary Constituency, and served as the YSRCP Regional Coordinator for the districts of Joint Prakasam, Joint Nellore, Bapatla, and Narasa Raopet.

He was appointed the Special Representative of the Government of Andhra Pradesh in Delhi.

=== Lok Sabha elections 2024 ===
YSRCP Rajya Sabha MP V Vijayasai Reddy was fielded by the ruling party at the prestigious Nellore (Lok Sabha constituency) for the Lok Sabha Election 2024. He was never prepared to contest in 2024 elections as his Rajya Sabha tenure is up to 2028. But he had to contest upon sudden instructions of his supremo as the existing candidate Vemireddy Prabhakara Reddy switched from YSRCP to TDP in the last minute. In a tough battle, He lost the seat to TDP's Nellore MP candidate Vemireddy Prabhakar Reddy with a margin of 2.4 Lakh votes.

=== Rajya Sabha ===
Position	Party	Constituency	From	To	Tenure
Member of Parliament, Rajya Sabha (1st Term)	YSRCP	Andhra Pradesh	22 June 2016	21 June 2022	5 years, 364 days
Member of Parliament, Rajya Sabha (2nd Term)	YSRCP	Andhra Pradesh	22 June 2022	25 January 2025	2 years, 217 days

== Awards and recognition ==
Reddy is a winner of the prestigious Sansad Ratna Award 2023 for his performance as a parliamentarian and was awarded by Prime Minister Narendra Modi and Parliamentary Affairs Minister Shri. Prahlad Joshi. He is also a winner of the Sansad Maharatna Award 2024 for his performance in chairing the Parliamentary Standing Committee on Transport, Tourism and Culture.

In 2020, he was awarded an Honorary Doctorate from University of Hyderabad for his contributions to public life.

== Embezzlement charges ==
=== Arrest ===
Vijayasai Reddy, an aide and financial advisor of Y. S. Jagan Mohan Reddy, was arrested on 2 January 2012, by Central Bureau of Investigation (CBI). He was the first accused to be arrested in relation to the disproportionate assets charges against Y.S. Jagan Mohan Reddy. The charges against Vijaysai Reddy include criminal conspiracy, cheating, criminal breach of trust, falsification of accounts and criminal misconduct. In addition, he was also charged with playing a mischief role in the sale of shares, worth 533 crores, of Santhoor Power Company.

=== Timeline of arrests and bails ===
- 2 January 2012: First arrest by CBI in relation to disproportionate assets against Y. S. Jagan Mohan Reddy.
- 13 April 2012: Bail granted by Special Court of CBI.
- 21 April 2012: Cancelled bail by High Court of Andhra Pradesh on review petition by CBI.
- 23 April 2012: Surrendered in CBI Court
- 30 April 2012: Granted bail by High Court of Andhra Pradesh, upholding Special Court of CBI's judgement given on 13 April 2012.
- 5 June 2013: Sent to judicial custody on cancellation of bail by Supreme Court of India.
- 8 October 2013: Granted bail by Special Court of CBI in Hyderabad.

== See also ==
- Yuvajana Shramika Rhythu Congress Party
- Y. S. Jagan Mohan Reddy
- Y. S. Rajashekhara Reddy
