= Nookala Narotham Reddy =

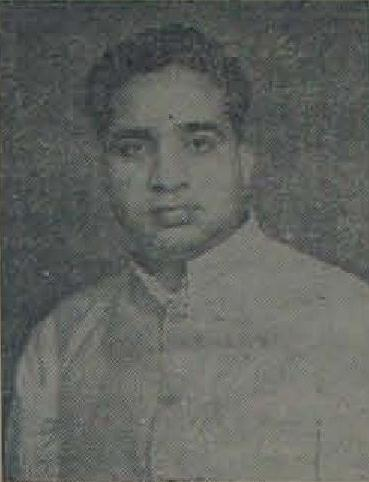
- N.Narothama Reddy

Member of Parliament

Personal details
- Born: 23 March 1921 Manukonda, Warangal district
- Died: 14 March 1984 (aged 62)
- Party: Indian National Congress
- Spouse: Sulochana Devi
- Children: 3 sons

Nookala Narotham Reddy, shortly N. Narotham Reddy M.A. (born 23 March 1921 - died 14 March 1984), was Vice Chancellor of Osmania University and Member of Rajya Sabha.

He is the son of Shri Ranga Reddy; born on 23 March 1921 at Manukonda, Warangal district. He married Shrimati Sulochana Devi. They had 3 sons. He did Master of Arts (M.A.) and worked as Editor of "Golakonda" magazine.

Reddy was member of Indian National Congress. He was President of Hyderabad Pradesh Congress Committee in 1956 and Andhra Pradesh State Congress Committee in 1960.

He was Member of Rajya Sabha from 2 April 1956 to 15 March 1960 and again from 3 April 1962 to 2 April 1968.

He was Syndicate member of Osmania University for about two decades and chosen as Vice Chancellor from 1972 to 1975.

He was chairman of Andhra Pradesh Lalit Kala Akademi and General Council member of National Lalit Kala Akademi.

Reddy died on 14 March 1984.
