= Venigalla Satyanarayana =

Indian politician (1918–1980)

Member of Parliament, Rajya Sabha
- In office 1970–1980
- Constituency: Andhra Pradesh

Personal details
- Born: 5 October 1918
- Died: 1980 (aged 61–62)
- Party: Indian National Congress

Venigalla Satyanarayana (5 October 1918 – 1980) was an Indian politician who was a Member of Parliament, representing Andhra Pradesh in the Rajya Sabha the upper house of India's Parliament as a member of the Indian National Congress.

Satyanarayana died in office in 1980.
