= Vijay Chintakayala =

Indian politician

Member of Parliament, Rajya Sabha
- Incumbent
- Assumed office 22 June 2026
- Constituency: Andhra Pradesh

State General Secretary, Telugu Desam Party
- Incumbent
- Assumed office November 2020 - Present

Convener, iTDP (TDP IT Cell)
- In office 2021–2026

President of Telugu Yuvata
- In office 2014–2018

Personal details
- Born: November 24, 1984 (age 41) Narsipatnam, Andhra Pradesh, India
- Party: Telugu Desam Party
- Spouse: Dr. Suvarna Kumari
- Children: 2
- Parent(s): Chintakayala Ayyanna Patrudu; Ch. Padmavathi
- Relatives: Rajesh Chintakayala (Brother)
- Education: George Washington University MIT School of Government, Pune Mahatma Gandhi Institute of Technology
- Occupation: Politician

Vijay Chintakayala (born 24 November 1984) is an Indian politician who is serving as a Member of Parliament in the Rajya Sabha from 2026 representing Andhra Pradesh. He is affiliated with the Telugu Desam Party (TDP).

In June 2026, Vijay was elected unopposed to the Rajya Sabha from Andhra Pradesh as a candidate of the Telugu Desam Party.

== Early life and education ==
Vijay was born on 24 November 1984 in Narsipatnam, Andhra Pradesh. He is the son of politician Chintakayala Ayyanna Patrudu and Ch. Padmavathi.

He earned a master's degree in political management from George Washington University, a master's degree in political governance from the MIT School of Government, Pune, and a Bachelor of Technology degree in Electronics and Communication Engineering from Jawaharlal Nehru Technological University.

== Political career ==
Vijay is associated with the Telugu Desam Party. He participated in party activities and campaigns, including the Youth for Babu programme, the Mee Kosam Padayatra campaign and Mee Kosam Padayatra campaign

In 2014, he was appointed president of Telugu Yuvatha, the youth wing of the Telugu Desam Party. In November 2020, he was appointed a state general secretary of the Telugu Desam Party. He later served as convener of iTDP, the party's information technology and social media wing. In April 2026, he was reappointed as state general secretary.

In June 2026, the Telugu Desam Party nominated Chintakayala as a candidate for the Rajya Sabha from Andhra Pradesh. He was elected unopposed on 11 June 2026.

== Personal life ==
Vijay is married to Dr. Suvarna Kumari in 2015. They have two children.
