= Kota Punnaiah =

Indian politician (1926–2013)

Member of Parliament, Rajya Sabha
- In office 1960–1978
- Constituency: Andhra Pradesh

Personal details
- Born: 4 May 1926
- Died: 29 June 2013
- Party: Indian National Congress

Kota Punnaiah (4 May 1926 – 29 June 2013) was an Indian politician. He was a Member of Parliament, representing Andhra Pradesh in the Rajya Sabha the upper house of India's Parliament as a member of the Indian National Congress.
