= List of Rajya Sabha members from Gujarat =

The Rajya Sabha (meaning the "Council of States") is the upper house of the Parliament of India. Gujarat elects 11 seats and they are indirectly elected by the state legislators of Gujarat. Earlier since 1952, Bombay State elects 17 seats, Saurashtra State elects 4 seats and Kutch State elects 1 seat. After Constitution (Seventh Amendment) Act of 1956, Bombay State elects 27 seats. After Bombay Reorganisation Act of 1960, three seats were increased and effective from 1 May 1960, the new Gujarat State elects 11 seats while new Maharashtra State elects 19 seats. The number of seats, allocated to the party, are determined by the number of seats a party possesses during nomination and the party nominates a member to be voted on. Elections within the state legislatures are held using Single transferable vote with proportional representation.

== Current members ==
Keys: BJP (11)

| Name | Party affiliation | Date of Appointment | Date of Retirement |
|---|---|---|---|
| Jagat Prakash Nadda | Bharatiya Janata Party | 02-Apr-2024 | 02-Apr-2030 |
| Jasvantsinh Parmar | Bharatiya Janata Party | 02-Apr-2024 | 02-Apr-2030 |
| Mayankbhai Nayak | Bharatiya Janata Party | 02-Apr-2024 | 02-Apr-2030 |
| Govind Dholakia | Bharatiya Janata Party | 02-Apr-2024 | 02-Apr-2030 |
| Subrahmanyam Jaishankar | Bharatiya Janata Party | 19-Aug-2023 | 18-Aug-2029 |
| Kesridevsinh Jhala | Bharatiya Janata Party | 19-Aug-2023 | 18-Aug-2029 |
| Babubhai Desai | Bharatiya Janata Party | 19-Aug-2023 | 18-Aug-2029 |
| Rajesh Shukla | Bharatiya Janata Party | 22-Jun-2026 | 21-Jun-2032 |
| Mukesh Rathwa | Bharatiya Janata Party | 22-Jun-2026 | 21-Jun-2032 |
| Mansingh Parmar | Bharatiya Janata Party | 22-Jun-2026 | 21-Jun-2032 |
| Jitendra Kanjariya | Bharatiya Janata Party | 22-Jun-2026 | 21-Jun-2032 |

== BJP MP List ==
| Name (Alphabetical Last Name) | Party | Date of Appointment | Date of Retirement | Term | Notes |
|---|---|---|---|---|---|
| Suryakantbhai Acharya | BJP | 19/08/2005 | 18/08/2011 | 1st | Death-21/12/2009 |
| Narhari Amin | BJP | 22/06/2020 | 21/06/2026 | 1 | * |
| Dineshchandra Anavadiya | BJP | 22/02/2021 | 18/08/2023 | 1 | Bye-e Ahmed Patel |
| Lekhraj Bachani | BJP | 03/04/2000 | 02/04/2006 | 1 | |
| Ramilaben Bara | BJP | 22/06/2020 | 21/06/2026 | 1 | * |
| Abhay Bharadwaj | BJP | 22/06/2020 | 01/12/2020 | 1 | Death: 1 December 2020 |
| Bangaru Laxman | BJP | 10/04/1996 | 09/04/2002 | 1 | |
| Jayantilal Barot | BJP | 10/04/2002 | 09/04/2008 | 1 | |
| Anantray Devshanker Dave | BJP | 10/04/1990 | 09/04/1996 | 1st | |
| Anantray Devshanker Dave | BJP | 10/04/1996 | 09/04/2004 | 2nd | |
| Babubhai Desai | BJP | 19/08/2023 | 18/08/2029 | 1 | * |
| Chunibhai K Gohel | BJP | 10/04/2014 | 09/04/2020 | 1 | |
| Prafull Goradia | BJP | 07/04/1998 | 02/04/2000 | 1 | bye 1998 res of A Patel |
| Smriti Zubin Irani | BJP | 19/08/2011 | 18/08/2017 | 1 | |
| Smriti Zubin Irani | BJP | 19/08/2017 | 18/08/2023 | 2 | Res.29/05/2019 -Ele 17-LS, Amethi |
| Arun Jaitley | BJP | 03/04/2000 | 02/04/2006 | 1 | |
| Arun Jaitley | BJP | 03/04/2006 | 02/04/2012 | 2 | |
| Arun Jaitley | BJP | 03/04/2012 | 02/04/2018 | 3 | |
| Subrahmanyam Jaishankar | BJP | 06/07/2019 | 18/08/2023 | 1st | bye 2019 res of Amit Shah |
| Subrahmanyam Jaishankar | BJP | 19/08/2023 | 18/08/2029 | 2nd | * |
| Kesridevsinh Jhala | BJP | 19/08/2023 | 18/08/2029 | 1 | * |
| Jana Krishnamurthi | BJP | 10/04/2002 | 09/04/2008 | 1st | Death-25/09/2007 |
| Mansukh L. Mandaviya | BJP | 03/04/2012 | 02/04/2018 | 1st | |
| Mansukh L. Mandaviya | BJP | 03/04/2018 | 02/04/2024 | 2nd | * |
| Kanaksinh Mohansinh Mangrola | BJP | 03/04/1994 | 02/04/2000 | 1st | Res.-02/11/1996 |
| Lalitbhai Mehta | BJP | 19/08/1999 | 18/08/2005 | 1 | |
| Rambhai Mokariya | BJP | 22/02/2021 | 21/06/2026 | 1 | * Bye-e Abhay Bharadwaj |
| Pravin Naik | BJP | 19/02/2010 | 18/08/2011 | 1st | Bye-e D. Acharya |
| Dilip Pandya | BJP | 19/08/2011 | 18/08/2017 | 1st | |
| Dr A. K. Patel | BJP | 03/04/2000 | 02/04/2006 | 1st | |
| Anandiben Patel | BJP | 03/04/1994 | 02/04/2000 | 1st | Res 12/03/1998 Ele GJ Assembly |
| Bharatsinh Parmar | BJP | 10/04/2008 | 09/04/2014 | 1st | |
| Kanjibhai Patel | BJP | 03/04/2006 | 02/04/2012 | 1st | |
| Keshubhai Patel | BJP | 10/04/2002 | 09/04/2008 | 1st | |
| Surendra Motilal Patel | BJP | 19/08/2005 | 18/08/2011 | 1st | |
| Urmilaben Chimanbhai Patel | BJP | 19/08/1993 | 18/08/1999 | 1st | |
| Parsottambhai Rupala | BJP | 10/04/2008 | 09/04/2014 | 1 | |
| Parsottambhai Rupala | BJP | 01/06/2016 | 02/04/2018 | 2nd | Bye-e D Rashtrapal |
| Parsottambhai Rupala | BJP | 03/04/2018 | 02/04/2024 | 3rd | * |
| Vijay Rupani | BJP | 03/04/2006 | 02/04/2012 | 1 | |
| Amit Shah | BJP | 19/08/2017 | 18/08/2023 | 1st | Res.29/05/2019 -Ele 17-LS, Gandhinagar |
| Chimanbhai Haribhai Shukla | BJP | 19/08/1993 | 18/08/1999 | 1st | Died-21/04/2008 |
| Savita Sharda | BJP | 19/08/1999 | 18/08/2005 | 1st | |
| Gopalsinh G Solanki | BJP | 10/04/1990 | 09/04/1996 | 1st | |
| Gopalsinh G Solanki | BJP | 10/04/1996 | 09/04/2002 | 2nd | |
| Jugalji Mathurji Thakor | BJP | 06/07/2019 | 18/08/2023 | 1 | bye 2019 res of Smriti Irani |
| Natuji Halaji Thakor | BJP | 10/04/2008 | 09/04/2014 | 1 | |
| Mahant Shambhuprasadji Tundiya | BJP | 10/04/2014 | 09/04/2020 | 1 | |
| Shankarbhai Vegad | BJP | 03/04/2012 | 02/04/2018 | 1st | |
| Lal Sinh Vadodia | BJP | 10/04/2014 | 09/04/2020 | 1 | |
| Shankersinh Vaghela | BJP | 10/04/1984 | 09/04/1990 | 1 | Res.27/11/1989 -Ele 9-LS, Gandhinagar |

== INC MP List ==
| Name (Alphabetical Last Name) | Party | Date of Appointment | Date of Retirement | Term | Notes |
|---|---|---|---|---|---|
| Brahma Kumar Bhatt | INC | 10/04/1996 | 09/04/2002 | 1 | died 6/1/2009 |
| Jitendrabhai Labhshanker Bhatt | INC | 14/08/1987 | 13/08/1993 | 1st | |
| Nanabhai Shah | INC | 03/04/1952 | 02/04/1956 | 1 | Saurashtra |
| Khemchandbhai Chavda | INC | 13/08/1960 | 02/04/1966 | 1st | bye 1960 |
| Khemchandbhai Chavda | INC | 03/04/1966 | 02/04/1972 | 2nd | Res.10/03/1971 Ele 5th LS, Patan |
| Suresh J Desai | INC | 03/04/1960 | 02/04/1966 | 1st | Bombay State |
| Suresh J Desai | INC(O) | 03/04/1966 | 02/04/1972 | 2nd | |
| Tilok Gogoi | INC | 20/07/1977 | 02/04/1980 | 1 | bye 1977 |
| Mohammed Husain Golandaz | INC | 03/04/1976 | 02/04/1982 | 1 | |
| Jethalal Harikrishna Joshi | INC | 22/04/1957 | 02/04/1960 | 1 | Bombay State Madhya Saurashtra 1952-57 |
| Jethalal Harikrishna Joshi | INC | 03/04/1960 | 02/04/1966 | 2nd | Bombay State |
| Shaktisinh Gohil | INC | 22/06/2020 | 21/06/2026 | 1 | |
| Jaisukh lal Hathi | INC | 03/04/1952 | 02/04/1958 | 1 | Saurashtra (state)Res-12/03/1957 Elected to 2nd LS |
| Jaisukh lal Hathi | INC | 03/04/1962 | 02/04/1968 | 2 | |
| Jaisukh lal Hathi | INC | 03/04/1968 | 02/04/1974 | 3 | |
| Kumud Ben Joshi | INC | 15/03/1973 | 02/04/1976 | 1 | bye 1973 dea D Patel |
| Kumud Ben Joshi | INC | 03/04/1976 | 02/04/1982 | 2 | |
| Kumud Ben Joshi | INC | 03/04/1982 | 02/04/1988 | 3 | Res.-25/11/1985 |
| Maganlal Bhagwanji Joshi | INC | 22/04/1957 | 02/04/1958 | 1 | bye 1957 resHathi Bombay State |
| Ibrahim Kalaniya | INC | 10/04/1972 | 09/04/1978 | 1 | |
| Ibrahim Kalaniya | INC | 10/04/1978 | 09/04/1984 | 2 | Died 27-7-1987 |
| Prof. Alka Balram Kshatriya | INC | 10/04/2002 | 09/04/2008 | 1 | |
| Prof. Alka Balram Kshatriya | INC | 10/04/2008 | 09/04/2014 | 2 | |
| Sumitra Kulkarni | INC | 10/04/1972 | 09/04/1978 | 1st | Switched to Janata Party in mid-term |
| Raoof Valiullah | INC | 10/04/1984 | 09/04/1990 | 1st | |
| Dr Dara Hormusji Variava | INC | 03/04/1952 | 02/04/1954 | 1st | Saurashtra State |
| Dr Dara Hormusji Variava | INC | 03/04/1954 | 02/04/1960 | 2nd | Bombay State |
| Shamprasad R Vasavada | INC | 30/08/1968 | 02/04/1970 | 1st | bye 1968 |
| Shamprasad R Vasavada | INC(O) | 03/04/1970 | 02/04/1976 | 2nd | Death -20/11/1972 |
| Amee Yajnik | INC | 03/04/2018 | 02/04/2024 | 1 | * |
| Lavji Lakhamshi | INC | 24/09/1952 | 04/02/1954 | 1st | bye 1952 Kutch State res Thaker |
| Lavji Lakhamshi | INC | 04/03/1954 | 04/02/1960 | 1st | Bombay State |
| Iqbal Mohammed Khan Lohani | INC | 13/08/1960 | 02/04/1964 | 1st | bye 1960 |
| Harisinh Bhagubava Mahida | INC | 14/08/1975 | 13/08/1981 | 1st | |
| Harisinh Bhagubava Mahida | INC | 14/08/1981 | 13/08/1987 | 2nd | Res.-15/03/1985 |
| Yogendra Makwana | INC | 05/03/1973 | 02/04/1976 | 1st | bye 1973 dea S Vasavada |
| Yogendra Makwana | INC | 04/03/1976 | 04/02/1982 | 2nd | |
| Yogendra Makwana | INC | 03/04/1982 | 02/04/1988 | 3rd | |
| Madhav Singh Solanki | INC | 03/04/1988 | 02/04/1994 | 1st | |
| Madhav Singh Solanki | INC | 03/04/1994 | 02/04/2000 | 2nd | |
| Premji B Thaker | INC | 03/04/1952 | 02/04/1954 | 1 | Saurashtra State res 26/07/1952 |
| Himmat Sinh | INC | 10/04/1972 | 09/04/1978 | 1st | |
| P Shiv Shankar | INC | 10/05/1985 | 13/08/1987 | 1st | bye 1985 res H Mahida |
| P Shiv Shankar | INC | 14/08/1987 | 13/08/1993 | 2nd | |
| Mahipatray M Mehta | INC | 03/04/1960 | 02/04/1966 | 1 | Bombay State - 5th LS Kutch |
| Pushpaben Mehta | INC(O) | 03/04/1966 | 02/04/1972 | 1st | |
| Irshad Baig Mirza | INC | 21/03/1983 | 09/04/1984 | 1st | bye 1983 dea of Piloo Modi |
| Irshad Baig Mirza | INC | 10/04/1984 | 09/04/1990 | 2nd | |
| Madhusudan Mistry | INC | 10/04/2014 | 09/04/2020 | 1 | |
| Raju Parmar | INC | 03/04/1988 | 02/04/1994 | 1st | |
| Raju Parmar | INC | 03/04/1994 | 02/04/2000 | 2nd | |
| Raju Parmar | INC | 03/04/2000 | 02/04/2006 | 3rd | |
| Ahmed Patel | INC | 19/08/2011 | 18/08/2017 | 4 | |
| Ahmed Patel | INC | 19/08/2017 | 25/11/2020 | 5 | Death, 25/11/2020 |
| Chhotubhai Sukhabhai Patel | INC | 14/08/1987 | 13/08/1993 | 1st | |
| Dahyabhai Patel | INC | 03/04/1958 | 02/04/1964 | 1st | Bombay State |
| Chimanbhai Mehta | INC | 10/04/1984 | 09/04/1990 | 1 | |
| Dahyabhai Patel | INC | 03/04/1964 | 02/04/1970 | 2nd | |
| Dahyabhai Patel | INC | 03/04/1970 | 02/04/1976 | 3rd | Death-11/08/1973 |
| Jadhavji Keshavji Modi | INC | 21/11/1957 | 02/04/1962 | 1 | bye 1957 res Shah Bombay State |
| Gulam Haider Valimohmed Momin | INC | 03/04/1964 | 02/04/1970 | 1 | |
| Pranab Mukherjee | INC | 14/08/1981 | 13/08/1987 | 3 | WB 1969-81 WB 1993-2004 |
| Maganbhai Shankerbhai Patel | INC | 16/08/1960 | 02/04/1962 | 1st | bye 1960 |
| Maganbhai Shankerbhai Patel | INC | 03/04/1962 | 02/04/1968 | 2nd | Death-16/04/1967 |
| Maniben Vallabhbhai Patel | INC | 03/04/1964 | 02/04/1970 | 1st | |
| Tribhuvandas Kishibhai Patel | INC | 21/07/1967 | 02/04/1968 | 1st | bye 1967 dea M Patel |
| Tribhuvandas Kishibhai Patel | INC | 03/04/1968 | 02/04/1974 | 2nd | |
| Vithalbhai Motibhai Patel | INC | 03/04/1982 | 02/04/1988 | 1st | |
| Vithalbhai Motibhai Patel | INC | 03/04/1988 | 02/04/1994 | 2nd | |
| Praveen Rashtrapal | INC | 03/04/2006 | 02/04/2012 | 1 | |
| Praveen Rashtrapal | INC | 03/04/2012 | 02/04/2018 | 2nd | Death-12/05/2016 |
| Naranbhai Rathwa | INC | 03/04/2018 | 02/04/2024 | 1 | * |
| Ramsinh Rathwa | INC | 03/04/1982 | 02/04/1988 | 1st | |
| Ramsinh Rathwa | INC | 03/04/1988 | 02/04/1994 | 2nd | |
| Sagar Rayka | INC | 27/01/1986 | 02/04/1988 | 1 | bye 1986 res of K Joshi |
| Bhogilal Maganlal Shah | INC | 03/04/1952 | 02/04/1956 | 1 | Saurashtra-Died.5-12-1976 |
| Kodardas Kalidas Shah | INC | 03/04/1960 | 02/04/1966 | 1st | Bombay State |
| Kodardas Kalidas Shah | INC | 03/04/1966 | 02/04/1972 | 2nd | Res.22/05/1971-Gov of TN |
| Maneklal Chunilal Shah | INC | 03/04/1962 | 02/04/1968 | 1 | 13/03/1967 |
| Manubhai Shah | INC | 03/04/1956 | 02/04/1962 | 1st | Res.-12/03/1957 Ele to 2 LS Madhya Saurashtra |
| Manubhai Shah | INC | 03/04/1970 | 02/04/1976 | 2nd | |
| Meghji Pethraj Shah | INC | 03/04/1956 | 02/04/1962 | 1st | Bombay State Res.-26/07/1957 |

== Other MP List ==
| Name (Alphabetical Last Name) | Party | Date of Appointment | Date of Retirement | Term | Notes | |
|---|---|---|---|---|---|---|
| Chimanbhai Mehta | Janata Dal | 10/04/1990 | 09/04/1996 | 2nd | | |
| Dinesh Trivedi | Janata Dal | 10/04/1990 | 09/04/1996 | 1 | WB 2002 - 08 | |
| Ghanshyam Oza | Janata Party | 10/04/1978 | 09/04/1984 | 1st | | |
| Prof Ramlal Parikh | Janata Party | 14/08/1975 | 13/08/1981 | 1st | | |
| H M Trivedi | Janata Party | 10/04/1972 | 09/04/1978 | 1 | | |
| Manubhai Patel | Janata Party | 10/04/1978 | 09/04/1984 | 1st | Died 27/03/2015 | |
| Piloo Modi | Janata Party | 10/04/1978 | 09/04/1984 | 1 | Death-29/01/1983 | |
| Sumitra Kulkarni | INC | Janata Party | 10/04/1972 | 09/04/1978 | 1st | Switched from INC in mid-term |
| Lal Krishna Advani | Bharatiya Jana Sangh | 03/04/1976 | 02/04/1982 | 2nd | DL 1970-76, MP 1982-89 | |
| Devdatt Kumar Kikabhai Patel | Bharatiya Jana Sangh | 03/04/1970 | 02/04/1976 | 1st | Died 27-12-2001 | |
| Rohit Manushankar Dave | Praja Socialist Party | 03/04/1958 | 02/04/1964 | 1st | Bombay State Died 11/10/1987 | |
| Dr Biharilal Naranji Antani | Swatantra Party | 03/04/1966 | 02/04/1972 | 1st | Death-16/09/1971 | |
| U N Mahida | Independent | 03/04/1968 | 02/04/1974 | 1st | Died 4-3-1991 | |
| Viren J. Shah | Independent | 14/08/1975 | 13/08/1981 | 1st | MH-RS 1990-96 | |
| Kishor Chandulal Mehta | Independent | 14/08/1981 | 13/08/1987 | 1 | | |
| Dr Yoginder K Alagh | Independent | 26/11/1996 | 02/04/2000 | 1st | bye 1996 res K Mangrola | |

- Star (*) Represents current Rajya Sabha members from GJ
