= 2014 Rajya Sabha elections =

Elections for the upper house of Indian Parliament

- Various dates in 2014

85 seats to the Rajya Sabha (Note: Including 13 casual vacancies)
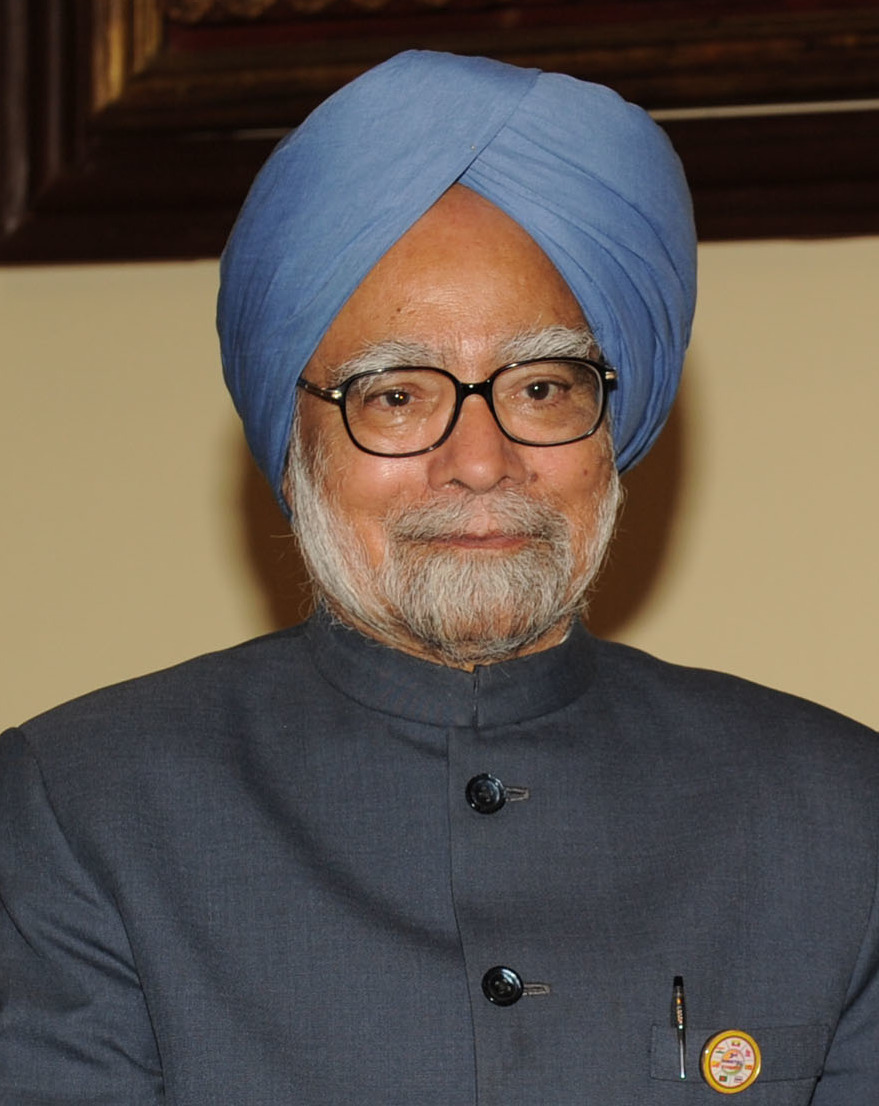

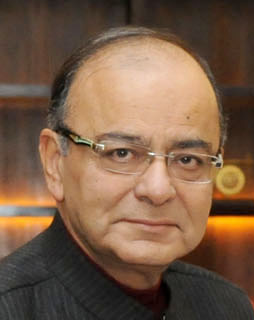
	First party	Second party
Leader	Manmohan Singh (Note: Ghulam Nabi Azad was elected leader of the Indian National Congress, on June 8, 2014, succeeding Dr. Manmohan Singh.)	Arun Jaitley
Party	INC	BJP
Alliance	UPA	NDA
Leader since	21 March 1998	3 June 2009
Leader's seat	Assam	Gujarat
Seats before	72	48
Seats won	69	45
Seat change	▼3	▼3

Rajya Sabha elections were held on three dates in 2014, to elect members of the Rajya Sabha, Indian Parliament's upper chamber. The elections were held in February, June, and November to elect respectively 55, 6, and 11 of its 245 members, from 16 of the States. They are held by an open ballot (for public scrutiny) on a single transferable vote (STV) basis among state legislators. Being even-numbered, 2014 was a year in which about 30% of the State Legislature-elected 233-seat component of the body was elected.

In addition to the 72 seats re-filled in this year of the six-year cycle (as the term of seat tenure is six years), 13 by-elections were held in 2014.

As of 2020, this is the last year in which the Bharatiya Janata Party has lost seats.

== February elections ==
The elections in February were from 16 state legislatures, and all were held on February 7, 2014.

=== Maharashtra ===
Has 19 members.

#	Previous MP	Party	Elected MP	Party	Reference
1	Husain Dalwai	INC	Husain Dalwai	INC	
2	Murli Deora	INC	Murli Deora	INC	
3	Yogendra P. Tiwari	NCP	Sharad Pawar	NCP	
4	Janardan Waghmare	NCP	Majeed Memon	NCP	
5	Rajkumar Dhoot	SHS	Rajkumar Dhoot	SHS	
6	Bharatkumar Raut	SHS	Sanjay Kakade	Ind	
7	Prakash Javadekar	BJP	Ramdas Athawale	RPI(A)	

=== Odisha ===
Has 10 members.

#	Previous MP	Party	Elected MP	Party	Reference
1	Mangala Kisan	BJD	Sarojini Hembram	BJD	
2	Renubala Pradhan	BJD	Anubhav Mohanty	BJD	
3	Balbir Punj	BJP	Ananga Udaya Singh Deo	BJD	
4	Ramachandra Khuntia	INC	Ranjib Biswal	INC	

=== Tamil Nadu ===
Has 18 members.

#	Previous MP	Party	Elected MP	Party	Reference
1	N. Balaganga	ADMK	S. Muthukaruppan	ADMK	
2	G. K. Vasan	INC	Vijila Sathyananth	ADMK	
3	Jayanthi Natarajan	INC	K. Selvaraj	ADMK	
4	S. Amir Ali Jinnah	DMK	Sasikala Pushpa	ADMK	
5	Vasanthi Stanley	DMK	Tiruchi Siva	DMK	
6	T. K. Rangarajan	CPM	T. K. Rangarajan	CPM	

=== West Bengal ===
Has 16 members.

#	Previous MP	Party	Elected MP	Party	Reference
1	Tarini Kanta Roy	CPM	Ritabrata Banerjee	CPM	
2	Prasanta Chatterjee	CPM	Kanwar Deep Singh	TMC	
3	Shyamal Chakraborty	CPM	Jogen Chowdhury	TMC	
4	Barun Mukherji	AIFB	Ahmed Hassan Imran	TMC	
5	Ahmed Saeed Malihabadi	Ind	Mithun Chakraborty	TMC	

=== Andhra Pradesh ===
Has 11 members.

Sr No	Previous MP	Party	Elected MP	Party	Reference
1	T. Subbarami Reddy	INC	T. Subbarami Reddy	INC	
2	Mohd. Ali Khan	INC	Mohd. Ali Khan	INC	
3	K. V. P. Ramachandra Rao	INC	K. V. P. Ramachandra Rao	INC	
4	Nandi Yellaiah	INC	K. Keshava Rao	TRS	
5	T. Ratna Bai	INC	Garikapati Mohan Rao	TDP	
6	Nandamuri Harikrishna	TDP	Thota Seetharama Lakshmi	TDP	

=== Assam ===
Has 7 members.

#	Previous MP	Party	Elected MP	Party	Reference
1	Biswajit Daimary	BPF	Biswajit Daimary	BPF	
2	Bhubaneswar Kalita	INC	Bhubaneswar Kalita	INC	
3	Birendra Prasad Baishya	AGP	Sanjay Sinh	INC	

=== Bihar ===
Has 16 members.

#	Previous MP	Party	Elected MP	Party	Reference
1	C. P. Thakur	BJP	C. P. Thakur	BJP	
2	Prem Chand Gupta	RJD	Ravindra Kishore Sinha	BJP	
3	Shivanand Tiwari	JDU	Kahkashan Perween	JDU	
4	N. K. Singh	JDU	Harivansh Narayan Singh	JDU	
5	Sabir Ali	JDU	Ram Nath Thakur	JDU	

=== Chhattisgarh ===
Has 5 members.

#	Previous MP	Party	Elected MP	Party	Reference
1	Motilal Vora	INC	Motilal Vora	INC	
2	Shivpratap Singh	BJP	Ranvijay Singh Judev	BJP	

=== Gujarat ===
Has 11 members.

#	Previous MP	Party	Elected MP	Party	Reference
1	Parsottambhai Rupala	BJP	Chunibhai K Gohel	BJP	
2	Natubhai Thakore	BJP	Shambhuprasad Tundiya	BJP	
3	Bharatsinh Parmar	BJP	Lal Sinh Vadodia	BJP	
4	Alka Balram Kshatriya	INC	Madhusudan Mistry	INC	

=== Haryana ===
Has 5 members.

#	Previous MP	Party	Elected MP	Party	Reference
1	Ram Prakash	INC	Selja Kumari	INC	
2	Ishwar Singh	INC	Ram Kumar Kashyap	INLD	

=== Himachal Pradesh ===
Has 3 members.

#	Previous MP	Party	Elected MP	Party	Reference
1	Shanta Kumar	BJP	Viplove Thakur	INC	

=== Jharkhand ===
Has 6 members.

#	Previous MP	Party	Elected MP	Party	Reference
1	Jai Prakash Narayan Singh	BJP	Prem Chand Gupta	RJD	
2	Parimal Nathwani	Ind	Parimal Nathwani	Ind	

=== Madhya Pradesh ===
Has 11 members.

#	Previous MP	Party	Elected MP	Party	Reference
1	Prabhat Jha	BJP	Prabhat Jha	BJP	
2	Maya Singh	BJP	Satyanarayan Jatiya	BJP	
3	Raghunandan Sharma	BJP	Digvijaya Singh	INC	

=== Manipur ===
Has 1 member.

#	Previous MP	Party	Elected MP	Party	Reference
1	Rishang Keishing	INC	Haji Abdul Salam	INC	

=== Rajasthan ===
Has 10 members.

#	Previous MP	Party	Elected MP	Party	Reference
1	Om Prakash Mathur	BJP	Narayan Lal Panchariya	BJP	
2	Gyan Prakash Pilania	BJP	Ramnarayan Dudi	BJP	
3	Prabha Thakur	INC	Vijay Goel	BJP	

=== Meghalaya ===
Has 1 member.

#	Previous MP	Party	Elected MP	Party	Reference
1	Wansuk Syiem	INC	Wansuk Syiem	INC	

== June elections ==
=== Arunachal Pradesh ===
Has 1 member.

#	Previous MP	Party	Elected MP	Party	Reference
1	Mukut Mithi	INC	Mukut Mithi	INC	

=== Karnataka ===
Has 12 members.

#	Previous MP	Party	Elected MP	Party	Reference
1	B. K. Hariprasad	INC	B. K. Hariprasad	INC	
2	S M Krishna	INC	Rajeev Gowda	INC	
3	Prabhakar Kore	BJP	Prabhakar Kore	BJP	
4	Rama Jois	BJP	D. Kupendra Reddy	JDS	

=== Mizoram ===
Has 1 member.

#	Previous MP	Party	Elected MP	Party	Reference
1	Lalhming Liana	MNF	Ronald Sapa Tlau	INC	

== November elections ==
The elections in November were from Uttar Pradesh and Uttarkhand, and were held on November 20, 2014.

=== Uttar Pradesh ===
Has 31 members.

#	Previous MP	Party	Elected MP	Party	Reference
1	Kusum Rai	BJP	Manohar Parrikar	BJP	
2	Ram Gopal Yadav	SP	Ram Gopal Yadav	SP	
3	Amar Singh	Ind	Chandrapal Singh Yadav	SP	
4	Brajesh Pathak	BSP	Javed Ali Khan	SP	
5	Brijlal Khabari	BSP	Tazeen Fatma	SP	
6	Avtar Singh Karimpuri	BSP	Neeraj Shekhar	SP	
7	Akhilesh Das Gupta	BSP	Ravi Prakash Verma	SP	
8	Veer Singh	BSP	Veer Singh	BSP	
9	Rajaram	BSP	Rajaram	BSP	
10	Mohammed Adeeb	Ind	P. L. Punia	INC	

=== Uttarakhand ===
Has 3 members.

#	Previous MP	Party	Elected MP	Party	Reference
1	Bhagat Singh Koshyari	BJP	Manorama Dobriyal Sharma	INC	

== By-elections ==
13 by-elections were held (caused by resignation, death or disqualification).

Seat No	State	Party		Party		Reference
1	Uttar Pradesh	S. P. Singh Baghel	BSP	Vishambhar Prasad Nishad	SP	
1	Andhra Pradesh	N. Janardhana Reddy	INC	Nirmala Sitharaman	BJP	
1	Bihar	Rajiv Pratap Rudy	BJP	Sharad Yadav	JD(U)	
2	Bihar	Ram Kripal Yadav	RJD	Pavan Kumar Varma	JD(U)	
3	Bihar	Ram Vilas Paswan	LJP	Gulam Rasool Balyawi	JD(U)	
1	Madhya Pradesh	Faggan Singh Kulaste	BJP	Prakash Javdekar	BJP	
1	Maharashtra	Tariq Anwar	NCP	Praful Patel	NCP	
2	Madhya Pradesh	Kaptan Singh Solanki	BJP	Meghraj Jain	BJP	
1	Tamil Nadu	T. M. Selvaganapathy	DMK	A. Navaneethakrishnan	AIADMK	
1	Odisha	Shashi Bhusan Behera	BJD	Bhupinder Singh	BJD	
2	Odisha	Rabinarayan Mohapatra	BJD	A U Singh Deo	BJD	
1	Haryana	Ch. Birender Singh	INC	Ch. Birender Singh	BJP	
2	Haryana	Ranbir Singh Prajapati	INLD	Suresh Prabhu	BJP	

=== Andhra Pradesh ===
#	State	Previous MP	Party	Elected MP	Party	Reference
1	Andhra Pradesh	N. Janardhana Reddy	INC	Nirmala Sitharaman	BJP	

=== Bihar ===
Seat No	State	Previous MP	Previous Party	Elected MP	Elected Party	Reference
1	Bihar	Rajiv Pratap Rudy	BJP	Sharad Yadav	JD(U)	
2	Bihar	Ram Kripal Yadav	RJD	Pavan Kumar Varma	JD(U)	
3	Bihar	Ram Vilas Paswan	LJP	Gulam Rasool Balyawi	JD(U)	
