= 2008 Rajya Sabha elections =

Elections for the upper house of Indian Parliament

(of 228 seats) to the Rajya Sabha
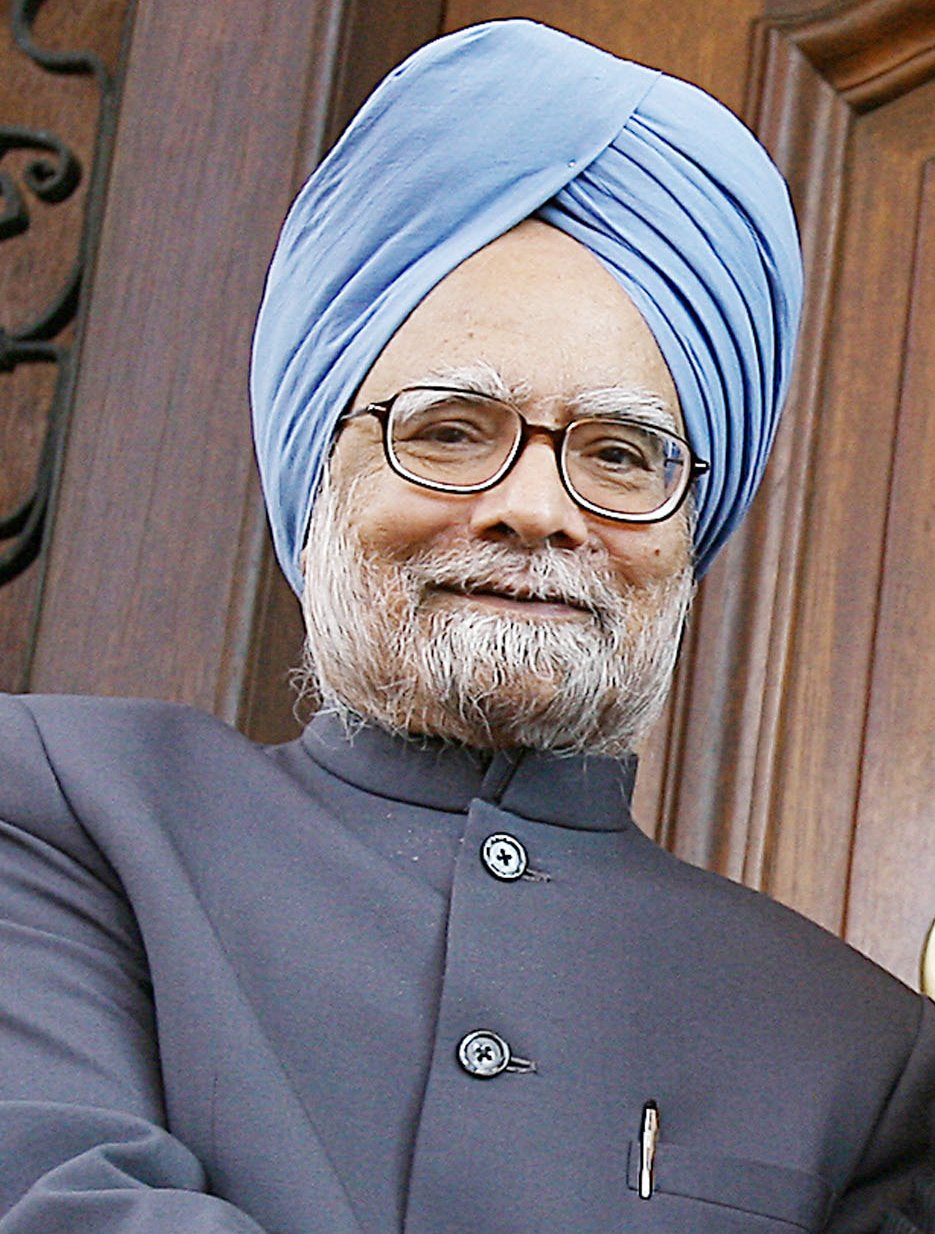

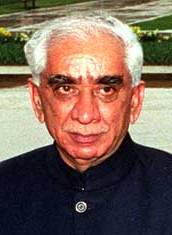
	First party	Second party
Leader	Manmohan Singh	Jaswant Singh
Party	INC	BJP

Rajya Sabha elections were held on various dates in 2008, to elect members of the Rajya Sabha, Indian Parliament's upper chamber. The elections were held to elect respectively 55 members from 15 states, four members from Karnataka and one member from Mizoram and Aruncahl Pradesh, and 11 members from two states for the Council of States, the Rajya Sabha.

== Elections ==
Elections were held to elect members from various states.

=== Members elected ===
The following members are elected in the elections held in 2008. The list is incomplete.

State - Member - Party

Rajya Sabha members for term 2008-2014
State	Member Name	Party	Remark
MH	Husain Dalwai	INC	
MH	Murli Deora	INC	
MH	Janardan Waghmare	NCP	
MH	Yogendra P. Tiwari	NCP	
MH	Rajkumar Dhoot	SS	
MH	Bharatkumar Raut	SS	
MH	Prakash Javadekar	BJP	
OR	Balbir Punj	BJP	
OR	Mangala Kisan	BJD	
OR	Renubala Pradhan	BJD	
OR	Rama Chandra Khuntia	INC	
TN	S A A Jinnah	DMK	
TN	Vasanthi Stanley	DMK	
TN	G. K. Vasan	INC	
TN	Jayanthi Natarajan	INC	
TN	N. Balaganga	ADMK	
TN	T. K. Rangarajan	CPM	
WB	Tarini Kanta Roy	CPM	
WB	Barun Mukherji	AIFB	
WB	Prasanta Chatterjee	CPM	
WB	Shyamal Chakraborty	CPM	
WB	Ahmed Saeed Malihabadi	IND	
AP	T. Subbarami Reddy	INC	
AP	Nandi Yellaiah	INC	
AP	Mohd. Ali Khan	INC	
AP	T. Ratna Bai	INC	
AP	K. V. P. Ramachandra Rao	INC	
AP	Nandamuri Harikrishna	TDP	
AS	Biswajit Daimary	BPF	
AS	Birendra Prasad Baishya	AGP	
AS	Bhubaneswar Kalita	INC	
BH	C P Thakur	BJP	R
BH	Shivanand Tiwari	JDU	
BH	N. K. Singh	JDU	
BH	Sabir Ali	JDU	
BH	Prem Chand Gupta	RJD	
CG	Motilal Vora	INC	R
CG	Shivpratap Singh	BJP	
GJ	Alka Balram Kshatriya	INC	R
GJ	Natuji Halaji Thakor	BJP	
GJ	Parsottambhai Rupala	BJP	
GJ	Bharatsinh Parmar	BJP	
HR	Ishwar Singh	INC	
HR	Ram Prakash	INC	
HP	Shanta Kumar	BJP	
JH	Jai Prakash Narayan Singh	BJP	
JH	Parimal Nathwani	IND	
MP	Prabhat Jha	BJP	
MP	Maya Singh	BJP	
MP	Raghunandan Sharma	BJP	
MN	Rishang Keishing	INC	
RJ	Om Prakash Mathur	BJP	
RJ	Dr Gyan Prakash Pilania	BJP	
RJ	Prabha Thakur	INC	
MG	Wansuk Syiem	INC	
AR	Mukut Mithi	INC	
KA	B. K. Hariprasad	INC	
KA	S M Krishna	INC	
KA	Prabhakar Kore	BJP	
KA	Rama Jois	BJP	
MZ	Lalhmingliana	INC	
UP	Akhilesh Das Gupta	BSP	
UP	Amar_Singh	BJP	
UP	Avtar Singh Karimpuri	BSP	
UP	Kusum Rai	BJP	
UP	Brijlal Khabari	BSP	
UP	Brajesh Pathak	BSP	
UP	Rajaram	BSP	
UP	Prof Ram Gopal Yadav	SP	
UP	Veer_Singh	BSP	
UP	Mohammad Adeeb	BSP	
UK	Bhagat Singh Koshyari	BJP	

== Bye-elections ==
The bye-elections were also held for the vacant seats from the State of Bihar, Nagaland, West Bengal and Bihar, West Bengal, and Madhya Pradesh.

- Bye-election was held on 26 March 2008 for vacancy from Bihar due to death of seating member Motiur Rahman on 18/12/2007 with term ending on 07/07/2010. Dr Ejaz Ali of JDU got elected unopposed.
- Bye-elections were held on 26 June 2008 for vacancy from Nagaland due to resignation of seating member T. R. Zeliang of NPF on 24/03/2008 with term ending on 02/04/2010, from West Bengal due to resignation of seating member Barun Mukherjee of AIFB on 06/05/2008 with term ending on 02/04/2012, and from Bihar due to disqualification of seating member Jai Narain Prasad Nishad of BJP on 26/03/2008 with term ending on 19/07/2010.H. Khekiho Zhimomi of NPF for Nagaland, Rajiv Pratap Rudy of BJP & R.C.Singh of CPI for West Bengal became members.
- Bye-election was held on 21 November 2008 for vacancy from West Bengal due to resignation of seating member Debabrata Biswas of AIFB on 23/09/2010 with term ending on 02/04/2014. Barun Mukherji of AIFB became the member
- Bye-election was held on 22 January 2009 for vacancy from Madhya Pradesh due to death of seating member Laxminarayan Sharma of BJP on 17/10/2008 with term ending on 29/06/2010. Narendra Singh Tomar of BJP became the member.
