= 2002 Rajya Sabha elections =

Elections for the upper house of Indian Parliament

(of 228 seats) to the Rajya Sabha
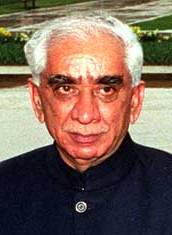

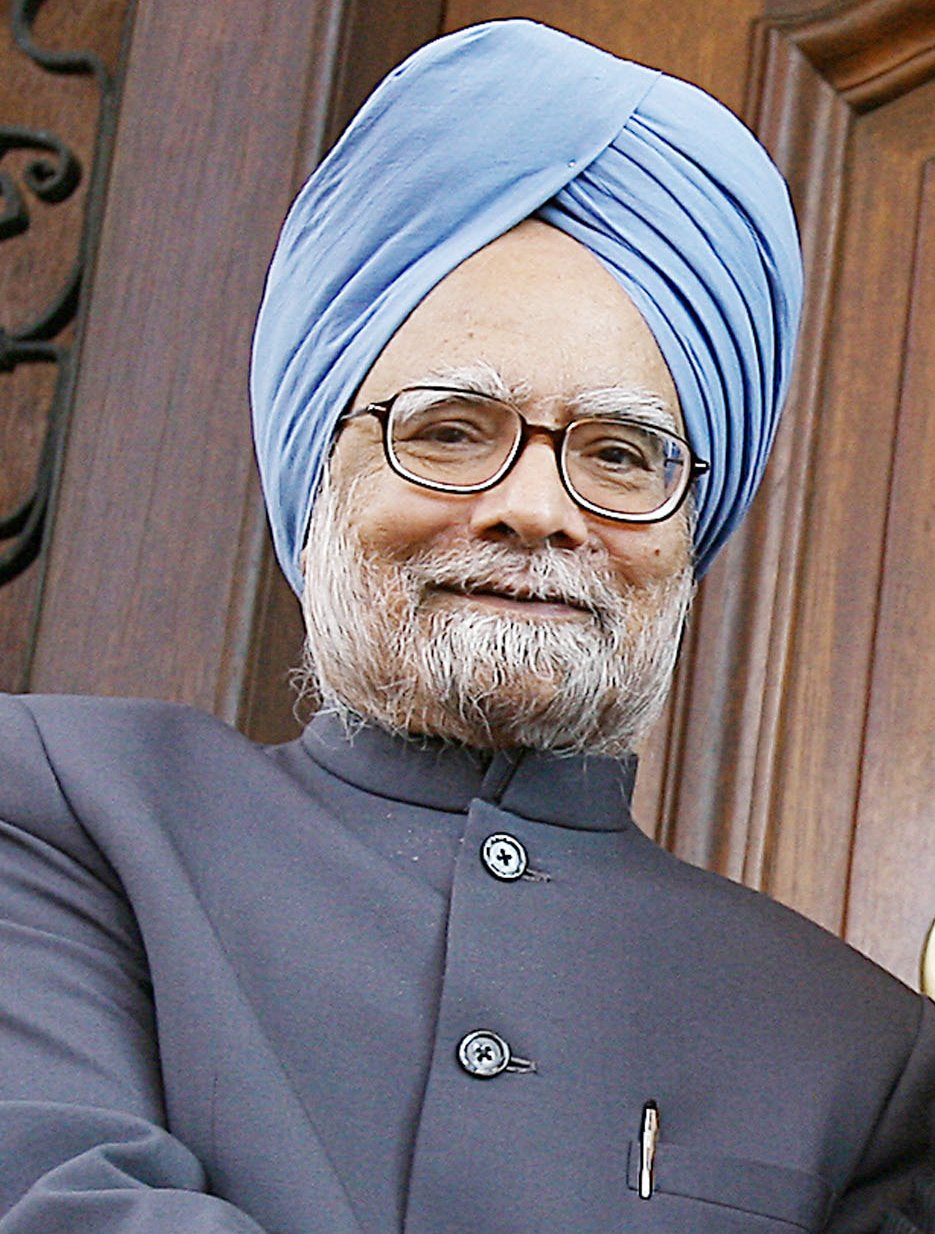
	First party	Second party
Leader	Jaswant Singh	Manmohan Singh
Party	BJP	INC

Rajya Sabha elections were held in 2002, to elect members of the Rajya Sabha, Indian Parliament's upper chamber. The elections were held to elect respectively 56 members from 17 states and four seats from Karnataka, four members from Jammu and Kashmir, and 11 members from two states for the Council of States, the Rajya Sabha.

== Elections ==
Elections were held in 2002 to elect members from various states. The list is incomplete.

=== Members elected ===
The following members are elected in the elections held in 2002. They are members for the term 2002–2008 and retire in year 2008, except in case of the resignation or death before the term.

State - Member - Party

Rajya Sabha members for term 2002-2008
State	Member Name	Party	Remark
MH	Ved Prakash Goyal	BJP	R
MH	Murli Deora	INC	
MH	Prithviraj Chavan	INC	
MH	Rajkumar Dhoot	SS	
MH	Eknath Thakur	SS	
MH	Datta Meghe	NCP	
MH	Mukeshbhai R Patel	NCP	dea 15/06/2002
MH	P C Alexander	IND	bye 29/07/2002
Orissa	Surendra Lath	BJD	
Orissa	Pramila Bahidar	INC	
Orissa	Sushree Devi	INC	
Orissa	Dilip Kumar Ray	BJP	
TN	R. Shunmugasundaram	DMK	
TN	G.K. Vasan	INC	
TN	N. Jothi	ADMK	
TN	S. P. M. Syed Khan	ADMK	
TN	Thanga Tamil Selvan	ADMK	
TN	C. Perumal	ADMK	
WB	Tarini Kanta Roy	CPM	
WB	Debabrata Biswas	AIFB	
WB	Prasanta Chatterjee	CPM	
WB	Sk. Khabir Uddin Ahmed	CPM	
WB	Dinesh Trivedi	AITC	
AP	T. Subbarami Reddy	INC	
AP	Nandi Yellaiah	INC	
AP	N. P. Durga	TDP	
AP	Ravula Chandra Sheker Reddy	TDP	
AP	S. M. Laljan Basha	TDP	
AP	Akarapu Sudershan	-	
AS	Urkhao Gwra Brahma	IND	
AS	Dwijendra Nath Sharmah	INC	
AS	Karnendu Bhattacharjee	INC	
BH	Shatrughan Sinha	BJP	R
BH	Vashist Narain Singh	SP	
BH	Magni Lal Mandal	RJD	
BH	Ramdeb Bhandary	RJD	
BH	Prem Chand Gupta	RJD	
CG	Motilal Vora	INC	R
CG	Ramdhar	INC	
GJ	Alka Balram Kshatriya	INC	R
GJ	Keshubhai Patel	BJP	
GJ	Jana Krishnamurthi	BJP	dea 25/07/2007
GJ	Jayantilal Barot	BJP	
HR	Harendra Singh Malik	INLD	
HR	Ram Prakash	INC	
HP	Suresh Bharadwaj	BJP	Res
JH	Devdas Apte	BJP	
JH	Ajay Kr. Masro	BJP	
MP	Suresh Pachouri	INC	
MP	Maya Singh	BJP	
MP	Mohd. Obedulla Khan	INC	
MN	Rishang Keishing	INC	
RJ	K. Natwar Singh	INC	
RJ	Prabha Thakur	INC	
RJ	Dr Ahmed Abrar	INC	dea 04/05/2004
RJ	Gyan Prakash Pilania	BJP	
MG	Robert Kharshiing	NCP	
AR	Nabam Rebia	INC	
KA	Janardhana Poojary	INC	
KA	Prema Cariappa	INC	
KA	M. V. Rajasekharan	INC	
KA	Vijay Mallya	IND	
Jammu and Kashmir	Tarlok Singh Bajwa	JKPDP	
Jammu and Kashmir	Saifuddin Soz	INC	
Jammu and Kashmir	Farooq Abdullah	JKNC	
Jammu and Kashmir	Aslam Chowdhary Mohammad	JKPDP	
UP	Akhilesh Das	BSP	Res 08/05/2008
UP	Abu Asim Azmi	SP	
UP	Amar Singh	SP	
UP	Isam Singh	BSP	Disq 04/07/2008
UP	Uday Pratap Singh	SP	
UP	Gandhi Azad	BSP	
UP	Mukhtar Abbas Naqvi	BJP	
UP	Rajnath Singh	BJP	
UP	Veer Singh	BSP	
UP	Shahid Siddiqui	SP	
UK	Harish Rawat	INC	R

== Bye-elections ==
The following bye elections were held in the year 2002.

State - Member - Party

- Bye-elections were held on 30/05/2002 for vacancy from Tripura and Punjab due to election to Lok Sabha of seating member Khagan Das on 25.02.2002 with term ending on 02.04.2004 and due to resignation of seating member Balwinder Singh Bhunder on 07.03.2002 with term ending on 09.04.2004
- Bye-elections were held on 30/05/2002 for vacancy from Uttar Pradesh and Jharkhand due to election to Lok Sabha of seating member Mohd. Azam Khan on 09.03.2002 with term ending on 25.11.2002 and due to resignation of seating member Dayanand Sahay on 19.03.2002 with term ending on 07.07.2004
- Bye-elections were held on 01/07/2002 for vacancy from Jharkhand due to election to JH Assembly of seating member Shibu Soren on 2 June 2002 with term ending on 2 April 2008.
- Bye-elections were held on 01/07/2002 for vacancy from Maharashtra due to death of seating member Mukeshbhai R Patel on 15 June 2002 with term ending on 2 April 2008. P C Alexander became member as IND candidate on bye 29/07/2002.
- Bye-elections were held on 18/11/2002 for vacancy from Uttar Pradesh due to resignation of seating member T N Chaturvedi on 20.8.2002 with term ending on --.
