= Parmar (surname) =

Parmar is an Indian surname.

== Notable people ==
Notable people bearing the name include:

- Abha Parmar (born 1963), Indian actress
- Arvind Parmar (born 1978), former British professional tennis player
- Ashish Parmar (1979–2020), Indian photographer
- Atmaram Parmar, Bharatiya Janata Party politician from Gujarat
- Belinda Parmar (born 1974), British entrepreneur, campaigner and corporate activist
- Bhaljibhai Ravjibhai Parmar (1920), Indian politician
- Bharatsinh Parmar, Indian politician
- Chirag Parmar (born 1990), Indian cricketer
- Dayaram Parmar (born 1945), Indian politician
- Dinesh Parmar, Indian politician and medical doctor
- Disha Parmar (born 1994), Indian television actress and former model
- Gajendrasinh Parmar (born 1978), Indian politician
- Gopal Parmar, Indian politician
- Govind Parmar, Indian politician
- Heena Parmar (born 1990), Indian actress
- Inderjeet Parmar, professor of international politics
- Ishwarbhai Parmar (born 1971), Indian politician
- Jashoda Parmar, Indian women politician
- Jaspal Parmar (born 1984), Indian football player
- Jaydrathsinh Parmar (born 1964), Bharatiya Janata Party politicians from Gujarat
- Jayveer Parmar (born 1998), Indian cricketer
- Juhi Parmar (born 1980), Indian anchor, actress, presenter, singer and dancer
- Kishan Parmar (born 1992), Indian cricketer
- Kripal Parmar (born 1959), Indian politician
- Madansingh Parmar (born 1936), Indian former cricketer
- Mahendrasinh Parmar (born 1967), Gujarati writer
- Manoj Parmar (born 1967), former Indian cricketer
- Mohan Parmar (born 1948), Gujarati language short story writer, novelist and critic
- Monish Parmar (born 1987), right-arm off-break bowler from India
- Mukund Parmar (born 1968), Indian former cricketer
- Natverlal Parmar (1927–2010), Indian politician
- Nilesh Parmar (born 1970), Indian former international cricketer
- Parmjeet Parmar (born 1970), New Zealand politician
- Parul Parmar (born 1973), Indian para-badminton player from Gujarat
- Pradip Parmar, Indian politician
- Pratibha Parmar (born 1955), British filmmaker- a writer, director and producer
- Raj Parmar (born 1981), British-Asian Bollywood dancer, choreographer, and television and radio personality
- Raju Parmar (born 1950), Indian politician
- Sandeep Parmar (born 1979), British women poet
- Sanjeev Parmar (born 1978), Canadian former soccer player
- Sarena Parmar, Canadian actress
- Shailesh Parmar (born 1969), Indian politician
- Talwinder Singh Parmar (1944–1992), Canadian-Sikh terrorist and religious extremist
- Vipin Singh Parmar (born 1964), Indian politician
- Vishvesh Parmar (born 1983), Indian playback singer/recording artist and composer
- Yashwant Singh Parmar (1906–1981), Indian politician
- Yusuf Parmar, Gujarat Indian National Congress politician
