= Battle of Variav =

11th century event in Gujarat

Date	Late 11th century
Location	Variav, Gujarat 21°15′39″N 72°49′14″E
Result	Raja of Ratanpur victory: Parsis of Variav killed or massacred

Belligerents
Raja of Ratanpur	Parsis of Variav

Commanders and leaders
Unknown	Unknown

Strength
Unknown	Unknown

Casualties and losses
Unknown	Unknown
- Location within Gujarat Battle of Variav (India)

Battle of Variav known as Tragedy of Variav in Parsi history refers to the late 11th century event in which the Parsis of Variav (in Gujarat) were subjugated to attack and massacre by the Rajput Raja of Ratanpur.

The Raja attempted to impose an exorbitant tribute on the small settlement of Parsis which they refused. They repelled the troops sent against them. Seeking revenge, the Raja launched a surprise attack on the community during a marriage festival. In a notable act of bravery, the Parsi women donned armour and fought valiantly in defence of their settlement but were overwhelmed. The event ended in a massacre of the Parsi community according to one version, while another tradition holds that the women drowned themselves in the Tapti River to avoid capture and dishonour. The tragedy, which occurred on Farvardin month, Arshishvang roz (25th Farvardin in the Zoroastrian calendar), is still commemorated by the Parsi community in Surat through special religious ceremonies.

== Background ==
For about three centuries after their landing at Sanjan, the Parsis lived in peace without any significant molestation. Over time, their numbers grew substantially, and many families began migrating to other parts of western India. They settled in places such as Cambay, Ankleshwar, Variav, Wankaner, and Surat in the north, and Thana and Chaul in the south. The Parsi settlement at Variav is believed to be one of the oldest. An inscription in Pahlavi found in the Kanheri Caves records that a group of Parsis visited the caves on 2 December 999 AD. Twenty-two year later 5 November 1021, a second band of group of Parsis visited the caves for an excursion. They left another inscription in Pahlavi to perpetuate the memory of their visit.

== Battle ==
The Parsi settlers in Variav engaged in agriculture and traders like other places. In late 11th century, the small Parsi colony had established itself at Variav. It was then under the rule of the Rajput Raja of Ratanpur. The Raja attempted to impose an exorbitant tribute on the Parsis. They refused to submit to the extortion. Instead, they took up arms and successfully defeated the troops sent to enforce the demand. Unable to retaliate openly, the Raja’s soldiers resorted to treachery. During a marriage festival outside Variav where all the local Parsi men had been invited. The Raja chose it as the moment to exact revenge. The Parsi women left with no choice decided to defend with courage. They donned the armour of their husbands and male relatives and took up arms to oppose the invaders. The women fought so bravely that victory seemed within their grasp. However, at the critical moment, the helmet of one of the female warriors fell off, revealing her long dishevelled hair. Upon discovering that they were being opposed by women, the Rajput soldiers rallied and launched a fierce assault, ultimately overwhelming the defenders. The outcome has two different accounts. The first states that the soldiers massacred the Parsi men, women, and children in a ruthless act of vengeance. The second account relates that the women preferring death over dishonour drowned themselves in the Tapti River.

== Aftermath ==
The day of this tragic event, which fell on the Favardin month and Arshishvang roz i.e. 25th day of Farvardin in the Zoroastrian calendar, is still commemorated by the Parsi community in Surat through special religious ceremonies.

== See also ==
- Battle of Sanjan

== Bibliography ==
- Hodivala, Shahpurshah Hormasji (2016-08-28) [1920]. Studies in Parsi History. Creative Media Partners, LLC. ISBN 978-1-372-07329-8.
- Hodivala, Shapurji Kavasji (1920). Parsis of Ancient India. S. K. Hodivala.
- Paymaster, Rustom Burjorji (1954). Early History of the Parsees in India from Their Landing in Sanjan to 1700 A.D. Zartoshti Dharam Sambandhi Kelavni Apnari Ane Dnyan Felavnari Mandli.
- Modi, Jivanji Jamshedji (2004) [1905]. A Few Events in the Early History of the Parsis and Their Dates. K.R. Cama Oriental Institute.
- Karaka, Dosabhai Framji (1884). History of the Parsis: Including Their Manners, Customs, Religion, and Present Position. Macmillan.
