= Variava =

Variava is a surname. Notable people with the surname include:

- Dara Hormusji Variava (1897–1961), Indian politician
- Heather Variava, American diplomat
- Sam Nariman Variava (born 1940), Indian judge
