= MSFC =

MSFC stands for:

== Sports ==
- Mamelodi Sundowns F.C.
- Markethill Swifts F.C.
- Metropolitan Sports Facilities Commission
- Michigan Stars FC
- Mickleover Sports F.C.
- Moroka Swallows F.C.
- Munster Senior Football Championship

== Other uses ==
- Marshall Space Flight Center, NASA
- Melbourne Science Fiction Club
- Multilayer switch Feature Card
- Maharashtra State Financial Corporation

== See also ==
- Microsoft Foundation Class
