= Ramilaben Bara =

Indian politician

Member of Parliament, Rajya Sabha
- In office 22 July 2020 – 20 June 2026
- Preceded by: Shambhuprasad Tundiya
- Succeeded by: Mukesh Rathwa
- Constituency: Gujarat

Member of the Gujarat Legislative Assembly
- In office 2004–2007
- Succeeded by: Ashwin Kotval
- Constituency: Khedbrahma

Personal details
- Party: Bharatiya Janata Party
- Spouse: Becharbhai Bara
- Education: B.Ed. (Gujarat Vidyapith); BA (Gujarat University)

Ramilaben Bara is an Indian politician and a member of the Rajya Sabha. She is a member of the Bharatiya Janata Party.

Ramilaben had contested Lok Sabha and Assembly polls as a BJP candidate in the past. She was, however, defeated by the Congress on all occasions except once in the 2003 elections. Ramilaben is the tribal face of the party in Gujarat. She is also the state vice president, a former MLA, and the chairman of the tribal development department. In 2017, she lost the Assembly polls for the Khedbrahma seat. In March 2020, she was nominated as a candidate of the Bharatiya Janata Party to the Rajya Sabha from Gujarat.
