= Little Miss Geek =

Little Miss Geek is a campaign that aims to inspire young women to consider careers in the technology and video-games industries. Little Miss Geek is the non-for-profit subsidiary of Lady Geek, a campaigning agency which aims to make technology more accessible and appealing to women.

== History ==
The campaign was launched on 3 October 2012 at the Apple Store on Regent Street by Belinda Parmar and her team at Lady Geek.

The Little Miss Geek campaign has received coverage in BBC, WIRED, Metro, The Guardian, The Independent and Computer Weekly.

== Her In Hero Campaign ==
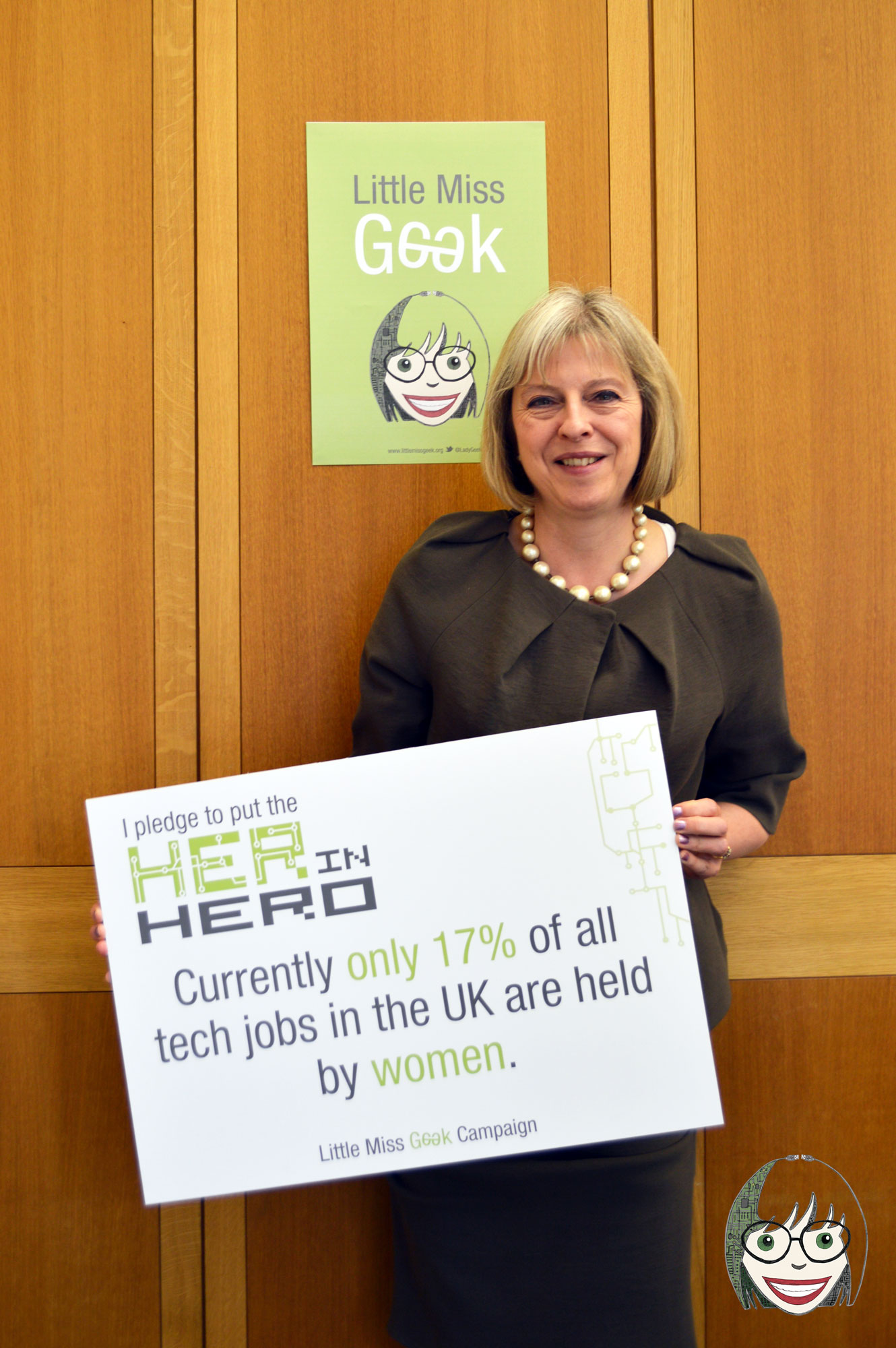
British MP and Home Secretary Theresa May supporting the Little Miss Geek campaign in 2013

For 2013 Ada Lovelace Day, Little Miss Geek created a campaign to put the 'Her In Hero'. Saying that 'Brilliant successful women in technology exist, but they are not celebrated in the same way their male counterparts are', the campaign urged schools and MPs to celebrate great female technologists, scientists and inventors to inspire girls with brilliant role models.

The campaign took place at over 15 schools across the UK, reaching out to over 10,000 students and gaining the support of over 40 MPs including Ms Jo Swinson MP, Hon Ed Vaizey MP, and Rt Hon Theresa May MP. The campaign received media coverage across Metro and the Guardian.

An event was held on the morning of Ada Lovelace Day at Highgate Wood School, featuring a talk from Siobhan Reddy of Media Molecule on her experiences with the games industry and how she got into it.

== School Takeovers ==
On 8 March 2013 (International Women's Day) Little Miss Geek ran the ‘Little Miss Geek ICT School Takeover’ at two schools in London: Queen Elizabeth's School for Girls and St Saviour's and St Olave's Church of England School. MP Simon Hughes attended the session and Boris Johnson who commented on the day. The events made use of Raspberry Pi computers in order to give girls actual software development experience, and address the gender imbalance in the technology industry.

According to Parmar, the Takeover events were intended to address an image problem: "girls think that people who work in technology are pizza-loving nerds who can't get girlfriends. The reality is technology is one of the most creative industries out there". "[Girls are] dreaming of using the iPad mini and the latest smart-phone, but they’re not dreaming of creating it,”

Parmar is a critic of British technology education. She states: "The education system should be the place where we convert childhood experiences with technology into an understanding about computing, where we lay the groundwork for a child to push on into adulthood with not only an interest in tech, but also the skills to start competing in the industry. As it is, however, we are failing our youngsters.”.

== Wearable Technology Event ==
On 25 April 2013 Little Miss Geek held a Wearable Tech Event in celebration of International Girls in ICT Day at St Saviour's and St Olave's Church of England School. Justin Tomlinson MP spoke to the girls about why the British Economy needs more women working in technology. The event featured contributions from fashion designer Francesca Rosella, wearable-technology specialists Cute Circuit, Microsoft and speakers from the British Fashion Council and was designed to shatter the "myth that technology is a boys-club".

British Vogue described the event as a "Collision of Fashion and Technology", however Metro questioned whether fashion can be used to introduce girls to technology.
