= Ekanath K. Thakur =

Indian politician

Ekanath Thakur
- Born: February 15, 1941; Mhapan, Sindhudurg
- Died: August 7, 2014 (aged 73); Mumbai, India
- Education: BA
- Occupation: Politician
- Notable work: Founder of National School of Banking
- Term: 2002-2008 (Rajya Sabha member)
- Political party: Shivsena

Shri Ekanath K. Thakur (15 February 1941 – 7 August 2014) was an Indian politician from the Shiv Sena party, born in Mhapan, Sindhudurg. He was a Member of the Parliament of India representing Maharashtra in the Rajya Sabha, the upper house of the Indian Parliament during 2002–2008.

Shri Thakur was the founder of National School of Banking, a successful training institute that prepares test takers for bank officers' exams in India. He was also chairman of the Board of Directors of Saraswat Bank, a leading Urban Co-operative Bank in India.

Shri Thakur held a bachelor's degree in arts (Hons.) and was also a CA. He served as the Director of the Central Board of State Bank of India, which has over 13,000 branches and business of nearly Rs 25 lakh crore. He was a Member of Parliament, Rajya Sabha, from 2002 to 2008, and was elected unopposed from the State of Maharashtra.

He was a member of the Parliamentary Standing Committee on Information and Technology, Defence, and Food Processing Industry. He was also a member of the Parliamentary Consultative Committee on Finance and Commerce. He served as the General Secretary of the World Bank (PNoWB), presided by Dr. Manmohan Singh and later by Mr. Shiraj Patil. He was vice president and later President of the All India Confederation of Bank Officers Organisations (AICBO), representing 2,00,000 officers and executives in India's banking industry.

In 1977, he represented India among 30,00,000 officers/ executives working in Public and Private sector in first ever World Conference for Officers held at International Labor Organisation (a branch of UNO), Geneva, Switzerland . At the conference, he was elected unopposed as Vice President of Officers Group from 127 countries. He was also elected as a member of the Drafting Committee. He was the Director of Maharashtra State Financial Corporation for four years during which he also acted as the chairman for two years. He was the President of Maharashtra Chamber of Commerce, Industry and Agriculture. He was also on Banking and Finance Committee of FICCI and was a member of Executive Committee of International Chamber of Commerce. He was Honorary Secretary and chief executive officer of Indian Education Society, one of the largest education institutions in Mumbai, having under its canopy 75 educational institutions. He was founder and Chairman of National School of Banking (NSB) which has trained over 3,00,000 plus candidates for numerous bank entrance exams through its 50 centers spread across India. He was Trustee of Kusumagraj Pratishthan, Nasik and Konkan Marathi Sahitya Parishad (Komaspaa). He was also President of Karachi Maharashtriya Shikshan Prasarak Mandal.

Award and Recognition:

1. Samaj Ratna Award
2. Dr. Babasaheb Ambedkar Award
3. Sane Guruji Award
4. Cancer Vijeta Award
5. Cancer Survivor Award. (He fought the affliction of cancer for 42 years and had undergone several surgeries and radiation, etc.)Rotary International's "Lifetime Achievement Award" at the hands of Rotary International Club's Dr. Mark Maloney and in the presence of Hon'ble Shri Prafulji Patel, then Union Minister for Civil Aviation in the Rotary International's District 3140 Annual Conference held at Hotel Leela Kempinski, in the presence of thousands of Rotarians. The "Excellence in Business Communication Award" given by the Association of Business Communicators of India (ABCI). Udyog Ratna Award given by Manohar Pratishthan The national-levef W.G. Alias Annasaheb Chirmule Charitable Trust conferred the Annasaheb Chirmule Award on Shri Thakur in recognition of his outstanding work in the field of banking and finance. In October, 2011 the All India Saraswat Cultural Organisation and "the All India Saraswat Foundation conferred the prestigious 'Saraswat Ratna Award' on Shri Thakur. (11) In March 2012, he was honoured with the Outstanding Konkani of the Year-2012 by the TMA Pai Foundation, Manipal In May, 2012 he was honoured with the Maxell Lifetime Achievement Award at the hands of Shri Prithviraj Chavan, Hon'ble Chief Minister of Maharashtra by the Maxell Foundation, Maharashtra.
