= Rambhai Mokariya =

Indian politician

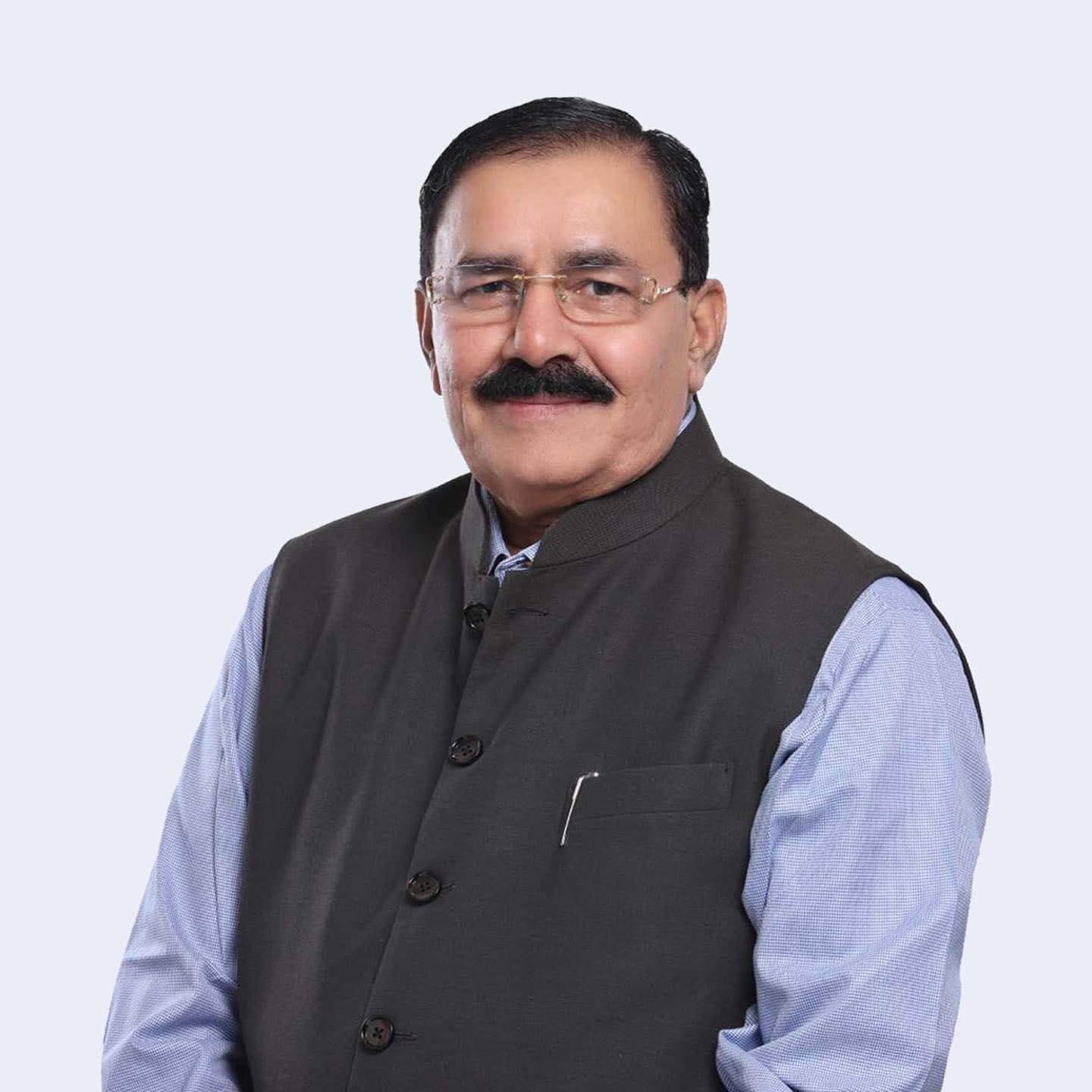

Member of Parliament, Rajya Sabha
- In office 19 February 2021 – 21 July 2026
- Preceded by: Abhay Bharadwaj
- Succeeded by: Rajesh Shukla
- Constituency: Gujarat

Personal details
- Born: 1 June 1957 Bhad, Porbandar district, Gujarat, India.
- Party: Bharatiya Janata Party
- Education: B.A. (Shri K.H. Madhvani Arts and Commerce College, Saurashtra University); LL.B. (D D Kotiyawala Municipal Law College, Saurashtra University)
- Profession: Businessman, politician
- Website: rammokariya.in

Rambhai Harjibhai Mokariya is an Indian politician. He was elected to the Rajya Sabha the upper house of Indian Parliament from Gujarat as a member of the Bharatiya Janata Party.

== Controversy ==
In the aftermath of the 2024 Rajkot gaming zone fire, where the building didn't have necessary fire safety certification, Mokariya alleged that before becoming an MP, he was forced to pay a bribe of ₹70,000 to get a fire department NOC for one of his properties. This incident garnered significant media attention after he physically pushed a local TV journalist from his residence, who had come to conduct an interview regarding his allegation, claiming trespassing.
