= Abhay Bharadwaj =

Indian politician and advocate (1954–2020)

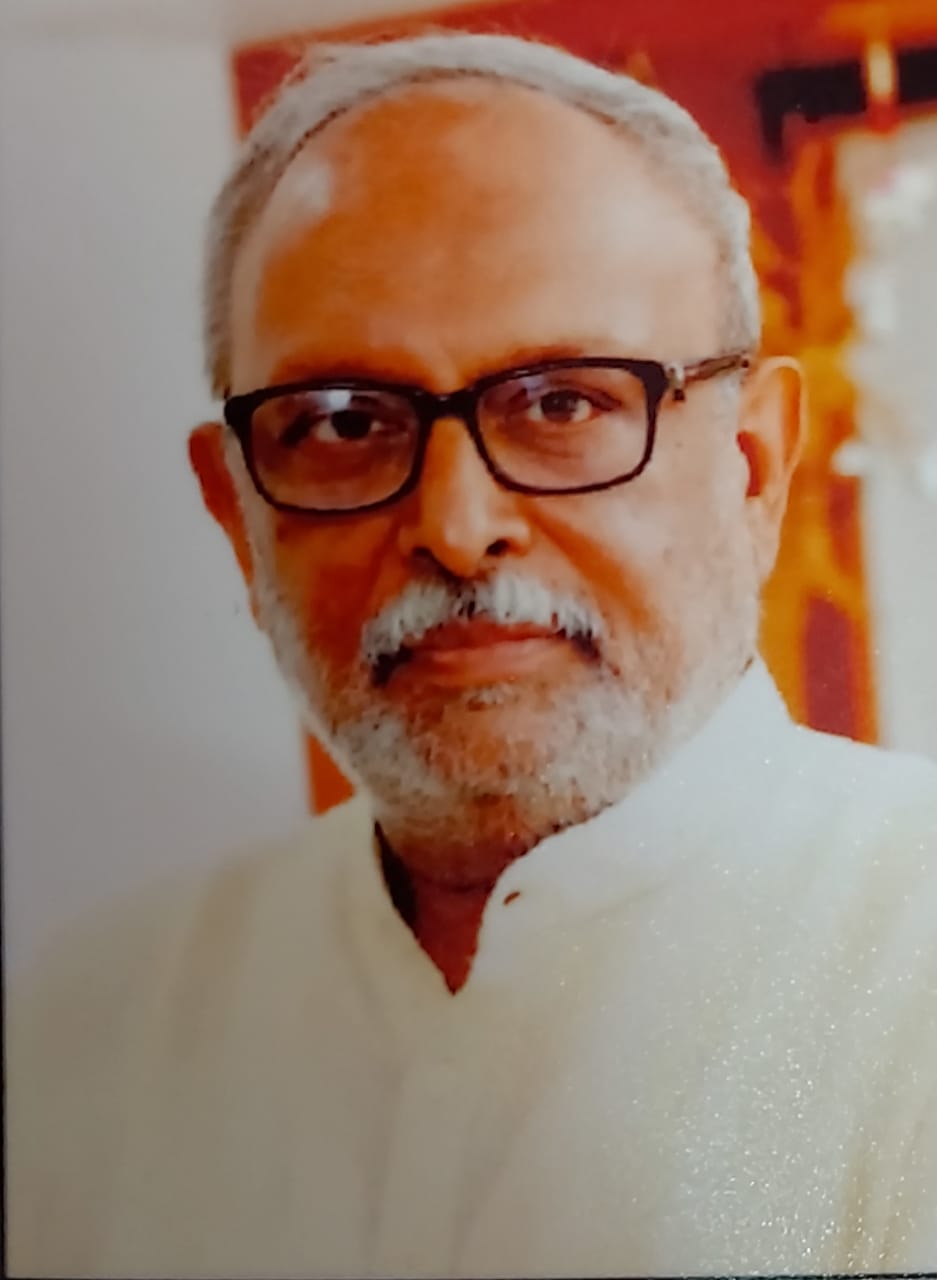

Member of Parliament, Rajya Sabha
- In office 22 July 2020 – 1 December 2020
- Preceded by: Chunibhai K Gohel
- Succeeded by: Rambhai Mokariya
- Constituency: Gujarat

Part-time Member, Law Commission of India
- In office 10 June 2016 – 31 August 2018

Personal details
- Born: 2 April 1954; Kampala, Uganda Protectorate
- Died: 1 December 2020 (aged 66); Chennai, Tamil Nadu, India
- Political party: Bharatiya Janata Party
- Spouse: Alka
- Children: 3
- Relatives: Nitin Bharadwaj (brother); Sadhana Mehta (sister)
- Occupation: Politician; attorney

Abhay Ganpatrai Bharadwaj (2 April 1954 – 1 December 2020) was an Indian advocate and politician who was a member of the Rajya Sabha. A leader of the Bharatiya Janata Party, he was closely affiliated with the Rashtriya Swayamsevak Sangh and the Akhil Bharatiya Vidyarthi Parishad since his college days. Bharadwaj had also unsuccessfully contested the Gujarat Legislative Assembly elections in 1995 as an independent candidate from Rajkot West.

== Early life ==
Abhay Bharadwaj was born on 2 April 1954 in Uganda, where his family lived then. In 1969 his family moved to India due to the civil war in Uganda.

== Legal career ==
He started his career as an advocate in 1980 with the Bar Council of Gujarat.

He was the lawyer who defended the accused in the Gulberg Society case, which took place during the 2002 Gujarat riots and culminated in the killing of nearly 70 residents of the neighbourhood. The trial culminated in a special court convicting 24 accused and acquitting 36 in 2016.

He also served as special public prosecutor for the Gujarat government in a case of alleged misuse of power against former IAS officer Pradeep Sharma during his tenure as Rajkot district collector.

== Political career ==
He was also a member of the 21st Law Commission of India and contributed towards legislation like Muslim Women (Protection of Rights on Marriage) Act, 2019 and Uniform civil code.

The government also appointed him on the committee to select a presiding officer for the central government's industrial tribunal.

He was sworn into the Rayja Sabha on 22 July 2020, as BJP MP.

== Death ==
Bharadwaj died of complications from COVID-19 in Chennai, on 1 December 2020, during the COVID-19 pandemic in India.
