= Sangam (newspaper) =

Urdu daily published newspaper

- Type: Daily newspaper
- Format: Broadsheet
- Founder: Ghulam Sarwar
- Headquarters: Ghulam Sarwar Clinic, Bhikna Pahari, Patna, Bihar
- City: Patna
- Country: India

Sangam is an Urdu daily published newspaper from Patna, Bihar. It was started by Ghulam Sarwar, an Indian politician from Bihar in January 1953. It became popular among Urdu reader due to its anti-congress nature. Ghulam Sarwar served as the first editor of the newspaper.

== History ==
It was started as a weekly newspaper in 1953 and since 1962, it was made a daily newspaper. It was also published from Kolkata till the death of Ghulam Sarwar in 2005.

== Editors ==
- Ghulam Sarwar
- Ejaz Ali
