= Ibrahim Kalaniya =

Member of Parliament, Rajya Sabha
- In office 1972-1984
- Constituency: Gujarat

Personal details
- Born: 1928
- Died: 1987 (aged 58–59)
- Party: Indian National Congress
- Spouse: Rehmatbai
- Children: 3 Sons and 3 daughters

Ibrahim Kalaniya (1928-1987) was an Indian politician, a Member of Parliament, representing Gujarat in the Rajya Sabha the upper house of India's Parliament as a member of the Indian National Congress.
