= Raoof Valiullah =

Indian politician

Raoof Valiullah was an Indian National Congress politician from Gujarat. He was a member of Rajya Sabha from 1984 to 1990. He was shot dead by the underworld gang in 1992.
