= Sam Nariman Variava =

Indian judge (born 1940)

Sam Nariman Variava (born 8 November 1940) is a retired Indian judge who was a judge of the Supreme Court of India from 2000 till 2005.

== Career ==
Variava was enrolled as an Advocate on 22 June 1964 and started practice on the original side of the Bombay High Court as well as in the Bombay City Civil Court. He passed LL.M. and also served as a part-time Professor of law in the Sydenham College of Commerce and Economics in Bombay. On 21 November 1986 he was appointed additional judge of the Bombay High Court, thereafter he became a permanent judge on 12 June 1987. Variava became the Chief Justice of Delhi High Court on 25 May 1999. He was elevated in the post of justice of the Supreme Court of India on 15 March 2000 and retired on 8 November 2005.

== See also ==
- Variav
