= Mohammad Adeeb =

Indian politician

Member of Parliament for Rajya Sabha
- In office 26 November 2008 – 25 November 2014
- Succeeded by: Chandrapal Singh Yadav
- Constituency: Uttar Pradesh

Personal details
- Party: Independent (Bahujan Samaj Party)

Mohammad Adeeb (born 5 September 1945) is an Indian politician from Delhi. He has been a former president of Rashtrawadi Samaj Party.

Before being a member of the Rajya Sabha represented the Bahujan Samaj Party. In 2019, he joined Shivpal Yadav's Samajwadi Party along with some Muslim leaders after the alliance of Samajwadi Party and Bahujan Samaj Party.

He graduated from Aligarh Muslim University and recently penned a book titled 'Zindagi Zara Ahista Chal', that sheds lights on the 50-year Muslim politics.

== Positions held ==
Year	Description
2008–2014	Elected to Rajya Sabha: Member - Committee on Labour (Jan 2009 - May 2009) & (Aug 2009 - Aug 2010); Member - Committee on Commerce (Sept 2009 - Aug 2010); Member - Select Committee to the Wakf (Amendment) Bill, 2010 (Aug 2010 - Dec 2011); Member - Committee on Information Technology (Aug 2010 - Nov 2014); Member - Consultative Committee for the Ministry of Information and Broadcasting (Aug 2010 - Nov 2014); Member - Court of the Aligarh Muslim University (Mar 2011 - Nov 2014)
