= Sheikh Khabir Uddin Ahmed =

Indian politician

Sheikh Khabir Uddin Ahmed, a politician from Communist Party of India (Marxist), is a Member of the Parliament of India representing West Bengal in the Rajya Sabha, the upper house of the Parliament.
