= Himmat Sinh =

Indian politician

Member of Parliament, Rajya Sabha
- In office 1972–1978
- Constituency: Gujarat

Personal details
- Party: Indian National Congress
- Spouse: Hasendra Kumari

Himmat Sinh is an Indian politician. He was a Member of Parliament, representing Gujarat in the Rajya Sabha the upper house of India's Parliament as a member of the Indian National Congress.
