= Gulam Rasool Balyawi =

Indian politician

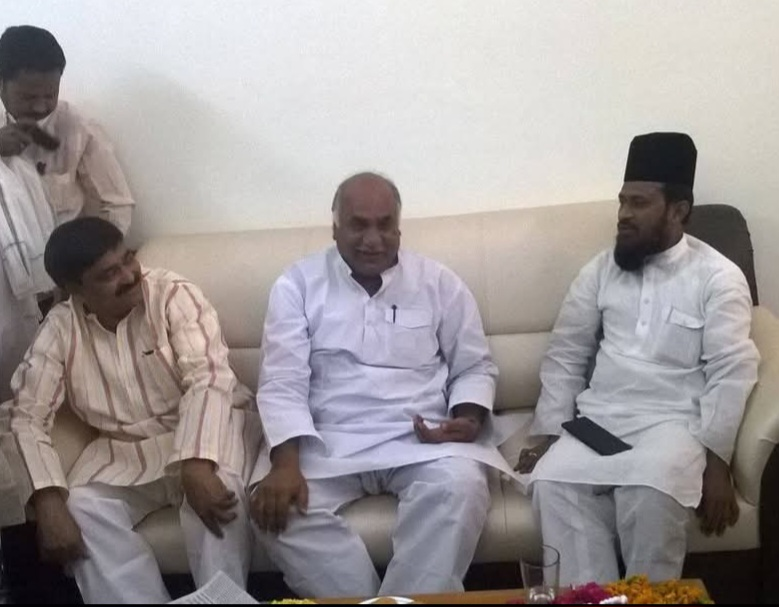
- Balyawi with Zubair ahmad qureshi and Suresh niranjan

Member of Bihar Legislative Council
- In office 8 July 2016 – 7 July 2022
- Preceded by: Uday Kant Choudhary
- Constituency: Nominated

Member of the Rajya Sabha
- In office 23 June 2014 – 7 July 2016
- Succeeded by: Ram Jethmalani
- Constituency: Bihar

Chairman of the Bihar State Minorities Commission
- Incumbent
- Assumed office 29 May 2025

Personal details
- Born: Gulam Rasool; 21 May 1969 (age 57) Semeri, Rampur, Ballia district, Uttar Pradesh
- Party: Janata Dal (United)
- Parent: Haji Saghir Ahmad Balyawi (father) Hajjan Ajmeri Khatoon (mother)
- Education: Fazilat (Chashma-e-Rehmat Oriental College, Ghazipur)

Gulam Rasool Balyawi (born May 21, 1969) is an Indian politician who is serving as the National General Secretary of Janata Dal (United) since 21 March 2023. He is the chairman of Bihar State Minorities Commission since 29 May 2025. He had served as a member of the Rajya Sabha from Bihar representing the Janata Dal (United) since 23 June 2014 to 7 July 2016. He was elected to Rajya Sabha in 2014 by-elections. He had served as a Member of the Bihar Legislative Council as a Nominated candidate representing Janata Dal (United) since 8 July 2016 to 7 July 2023. He is the founder of Non-governmental Barelvi organisation Qaumi Ittehad Morcha.

== Early life and education ==
Gulam Rasool Balyawi was born as Gulam Rasool in Semeri Village of Rampur Block in Ballia district, Uttar Pradesh to Haji Saghir Ahmad Balyawi and Hajjan Ajmeri Khatoon.

== Controversies ==
Balyawi called to change the cities like Karbala from a stage during a religious rally in Hazaribagh, Jharkhand, in response to the remarks made by Nupur Sharma, a former Spokesperson of Bharatiya Janata Party on Prophet Muhammad. He said, the lives of Muslims are for Muhammad and not theirs. Later, Balyawi said that turning cities into Karbala is to give away everything, sacrifice everything, but not let humanity and brotherhood be sacrificed.

=== Demanding Safety Act ===
Balyawi called to jam Ranchi to demand Muslim Safety Act and Namoos-e-Risalat Act. He later, attended a program at Sitamarhi, Bihar and against raised voice for the Muslim Safety Act.
