= Dwijendra Nath Sharmah =

Indian politician

Shri Dwijendra Nath Sharmah, a politician from Indian National Congress party, was a member of the Parliament of India representing Assam in the Rajya Sabha, the upper house of the Indian Parliament from 2002 to 2008.
