= Anant Dave =

Indian politician (1938–2012)

Member of Lok Sabha for Kutch
- In office 27 March 1977 – 22 August 1979

Member of Rajya Sabha for Gujarat
- In office 10 April 1990 – 9 April 2002

Personal details
- Born: Anantray Devshanker Dave; 27 May 1938 Mandvi, Kutch district, Gujarat, India
- Died: 7 October 2012 (aged 74)
- Party: Bharatiya Janata Party
- Spouse: Indira Anant Dave
- Parent(s): Devshanker (father); Kashiben (mother)
- Education: Bachelor of Arts; Bachelor of Laws
- Occupation: Lecturer

Anantray Devshanker Dave (27 May 1938 – 7 October 2012) was an Indian politician from the state of Gujarat, who represented Kutch constituency in the 6th Lok Sabha and was a member of the Rajya Sabha from 1990 to 2002. Born in Mandvi, he served as a member of the Mandvi Municipality and chairman of Sardar Patel Jal Sanchay Nigam.

== Personal life ==
Dave was born to Devshanker and Kashiben on 27 May 1938 in Mandvi, Kutch district. He completed his study of law from Gujarat University. He served as a lecturer in Sheth S.V.College. He married Indira Anant Dave on 11 December 1968. He has one son named Devang Dave and two daughters named Nehal Dave and Hetal Dave.

== Political career ==
Dave started his political career in the Rashtriya Swayamsevak Sangh. He served as a member of the Mandvi municipality for two terms. He won the 1977 Indian general election from Kutch constituency (now known as Kachchh) as a Janata Party candidate, and became a member of the 6th Lok Sabha. He had defeated Indian National Congress' senior politician Mahipat Mehta, and rose to the status of "giant killer". He was detained under Maintenance of Internal Security Act for eleven months during the emergency. He represented Gujarat in the Rajya Sabha from 1990 to 2002. He actively participated in water conservation movement in the Kutch district, and as the chairman of the Sardar Patel Jal Sanchay Nigam, he was the "cornerstone" for building eleven thousand checks dams in Kutch.

== Death ==
Dave died on 7 October 2012 after prolonged illness due to cancer. Narendra Modi expressed grief over his death, and said that he "played a key role in the development of Kutch". Vice President of India Hamid Ansari said that "the country has lost a noted social worker and able parliamentarian". Parsottambhai Rupala and Keshubhai Patel also expressed grief over his death.
