= Ratanpur Dhamanka =

Human settlement in Gujarat, India

Ratanpur Dhamanka is a village and former non-salute Rajput princely state on Saurashtra peninsula in Gujarat, western India.

== History ==
The petty princely state, in Gohelwar prant, was ruled by Gohel Rawal Rajput Chieftains. It comprised a second village, with a combined population of 651 in 1901, yielding 4,200 Rupees state revenue (1903–4, all from land), paying 903 Rupees tribute, to the Gaikwar Baroda State and Junagadh State.

== Sources and external links ==
- Imperial Gazetteer, on DSAL.UChicago.edu - Kathiawar
