= Chimanbhai Mehta =

Indian politician

Member of Parliament, Rajya Sabha
- In office 1984-1996
- Constituency: Gujarat

Personal details
- Born: 3 June 1925
- Died: 26 January 2010 (aged 84)
- Party: Janata Dal
- Other political affiliations: Indian National Congress
- Spouse: Nirmala Ben Mehta
- Children: Rahul Chimanbhai Mehta

Chimanbhai Mehta (3 June 1925 – 26 January 2010) was an Indian politician. He was a Member of Parliament, representing Gujarat in the Rajya Sabha the upper house of India's Parliament.

He also served on the panel of the Vice Chairmen Rajya Sabha from 1984 to 1985. He also served as Union Minister for State for Human Resource Development from 1989 to 1990.
