= Rajesh Shukla (politician) =

Indian politician and Rajya Sabha member from Gujarat

Member of Parliament, Rajya Sabha
- Incumbent
- Assumed office 21 June 2026
- Preceded by: Rambhai Mokariya
- Constituency: Gujarat

Personal details
- Party: Bharatiya Janata Party
- Occupation: Politician

Rajesh Shukla is an Indian politician from the Bharatiya Janata Party. He is a Member of Parliament, representing Gujarat in the Rajya Sabha, the upper house of India's Parliament since June 2026. Before his election to the Rajya Sabha, he was in-charge of the BJP's Surendranagar district unit and had previously served as the general secretary of the BJP unit for Mehsana district and as president of the municipality of Kadi town.

In October 2026, a single judge bench of the Gujarat High Court issued a summons to Shukla after Tushar Chaudhary, an Indian National Congress MLA in the Gujarat Legislative Assembly, filed an election petition seeking that Shukla's election to the Rajya Sabha be declared as null and void. Chaudhary's petition alleged that Shukla had suppressed information about a criminal case against him at the time of filing his nomination for the election.
