= Ejaz Ali =

Indian politician

Member of the Rajya Sabha
- In office 20 March 2008 – 7 July 2010
- Preceded by: Motiur Rahman
- Constituency: Bihar

National Convenor of All-India Backward Muslim Morcha
- Incumbent
- Assumed office 1994

Chief editor and publisher of Sangam
- In office 1998–2012

Personal details
- Party: Rashtriya Janata Dal
- Other political affiliations: Janata Dal (United)

Ejaz Ali is an Indian social worker, doctor, journalist and politician who served as a member of the Rajya Sabha from Bihar representing the Janata Dal (United) from 20 March 2008 to 7 July 2010. He formed All-India Backward Muslim Morcha, an organisation fighting exclusively for Dalit Muslims and serving as the national convenor since its foundation in 1994. He had worked for Sangam, an Urdu daily published from Patna as the Chief editor and publisher from 1998 to 2012. He joined Rashtriya Janata Dal in 2014 in presence of Lalu Prasad Yadav.

He is a doctor by profession and has been practicing medicine in Patna since 1984. He is charging 10 Rupees for his consultation at the Ejaz Clinic, Patna.

== Early life and education ==
Ejaz Ali was born in 1958 into a lower middle-class family of Sheikh Mumtaz Ali, who served as a Block divisional officer during the British Raj, as the sixth among 10 siblings. He belonged to the Kunjra caste.

He started his education at Madrasa Anjuman Islamia School, Munger and studied till 7th there and completed matriculation from Hazaribagh District School. He joined Patna Science College under Patna University for Intermediate. Later, he was admitted to the Patna Medical College and Hospital in 1975 for Bachelor of Medicine, Bachelor of Surgery and also completed master's in surgery.

== Personal life ==
Ejaz Ali was married to the daughter of Ghulam Sarwar, an Indian politician from Bihar.
