= Variav =

- Suburb
- Location in Gujarat, India
- Coordinates: 21°15′39″N 72°49′14″E
- Country: India
- State: Gujarat
- District: Surat

Languages
  - Official: Gujarati, Hindi
- Time zone: UTC+5:30 (IST)
- PIN: 394520
- Nearest city: surat

Variav is a village in Surat District, Gujarat, India. Variav is on the right bank of Tapti River. Variav was recently added to the region of Surat Municipal Corporation, and is now a suburb of Greater Surat.

== History ==
Variav is an ancient village of some historical importance in the district of Surat, which has been a major port city. As a result, international interaction of people of Surat is common and they traveled for business to far lands and many foreigners came to India via Surat. The people of Variav in particular are known for their welcoming attitude towards immigrants. As early as the seventh century CE it was the place of choice for migration by the Zoroastrians fleeing the fall of the Sassanid Empire. The arrival of Zoroastrians in India is documented in Qissa-i Sanjan, and the date of first arrival is variously interpreted as being 936 AD, 765 AD and 716 AD. Others have noted a gradual period of immigration between the 10th and 12th centuries. Similarly, many Memons who came from Sindh were also welcomed in Surat. Traders and religious scholars from Turkey, Central Asia and Middle East also settled in Surat and many Muslim Surtis and Variavwala trace their ancestry to these immigrants though many Muslims may also just be descendants of sons of soil whose family may have converted to Islam from Hinduism. These Muslim families can be traced in Variav from the 12th century at least with influence of Turkey and Central Asia and many families of Variav have undertaken the tradition of having a Hafiz ul Quran in their family.

== Variav tragedy ==
The Parsis landed as refugees in Sanjan but they worked very hard and prospered as agriculturists and artisans. Gujarati had become the native language of the community, and the sari was now the traditional garment of Parsi women. While they adapted to the land, they still kept their religion and customs alive. By the end of the 10th century the Parsis began to settle all over Gujarat and spread to Bharuch, Variav, Cambay, Navsari and Ankleswar. Variav is a settlement near Surat on the Tapti river, and the story of the heroism of the Parsi women of Variav is sung in Garbas (Gujarati folk songs) till this day.

The Parsis had prospered through their hard work and the rich earth of Gujarat yielded fruitful returns. They grew a variety of flowers and all types of grains and cereals. Their prosperity made the Raja of Ratanpur jealous. Towards the end of the 11th century he demanded a huge tribute from the Parsis. The Parsis refused to pay and the king sent troops to enforce his law. The Parsis, who were law abiding, now gathered together to resist this unjust tax. The king's troops had to retreat in defeat.

The king got even angrier and began plotting the downfall of the settlement. His spies informed him that the men of the community were going to be away at a ghambar (seasonal festival and feast) in the village of Tena near Surat. All adult men would be busy attending the festivities and the land would be easy to capture and destroy.

As the troops gathered outside the village, the brave village women of Variav decided that they could not give up their homes and fields without a fight. One of the women had a plan. She quickly gathered all the women and persuaded them to put on the clothes and armour of their men folk. They hid their long hair under the metal helmets of the men. When the king's troops attacked Variav they were surprised to find a large army of men facing them across the fields. The battle was long and fierce, the women had just started chasing the Ratanpur troops from their land when a sudden blow to a woman's helmet dislodged it and the woman's long hair was revealed. The fleeing soldiers saw that it was women they were fighting, and the cry went up that women would not defeat them. The soldiers turned back and fought fiercely. The women were tired now and had lost hope of victory. They decided that they would never surrender to injustice and raced across the fields to the Tapti river. They flung themselves into the river and drowned, preferring death to dishonour.

The ghambar over, the men returned at night from Tena. The Raja of Ratanpur's army awaited the men's return from the feast & the men fought back and defeated them out avenging the women. The soldiers did not even spare the children of the village.

Today, the courage of the Variav women is remembered in special prayers held in their memory at the Fire Temples of Navsari.

== Demographics and migration ==
Variav is home to a mixed population of Sunni Vohra, Parsi, and various castes of Hindu.

Surat being a major port city, from early times, Variavwala were sea-faring people interested in trade and commerce and traveled to foreign lands, undertaking long sea voyages. Many foreigners who came to Surat assimilated and some settled in Variav. People also left Variav in the early 19th century to settle in Burma, where they established many businesses and were great entrepreneurs; a number of them even became advisers to the Burmese rulers and contributed greatly to Burma's economic development. The Mayet, Seedat, Goonda, Bawa, Madha, Karwa, Manjra, Munnee, Mamsa, Baggia, Mapara and Ghulam Mohammed tribes were among the first Muslim tribes of Variav to migrate from Variav to Burma though maintaining links to Variav. However, many migrated to Pakistan due to the partition of India and Pakistan.

The largest populations of Variavwala outside India is in UK, USA and Pakistan.

== Amenities ==
Variav has its own drinking water tank from 1903 AD set up by Ebrahim Madha. The actual machinery was imported from Belgium.

In terms of religious establishments, there are four mosques, one madrassa, and one big Jain Derashar, as well as several Hindu temples. Other public facilities include two government-run schools and a library.

== See also ==
- Qissa-i Sanjan, an account of the early years of Zoroastrian settlers in India.
- List of tourist attractions in Surat
- Sam Nariman Variava
- Dara Hormusji Variava
