= T. S. Bajwa =

Indian politician

Member of Parliament, Rajya Sabha
- In office 2002 – 25 November 2008
- Constituency: Jammu and Kashmir

Personal details
- Party: Jammu and Kashmir People's Democratic Party (till October 2020)
- Spouse: Manjeet Kaur
- Profession: Politician

T.S. Bajwa is a politician and was a member of the Parliament of India representing Jammu and Kashmir in the Rajya Sabha (the upper house of the Parliament), with term ending on 25 November 2008. He resign from Jammu and Kashmir People's Democratic Party on 26 October 2020.

In March 2014, he was one of 48 politicians who were debarred by the Election Commission of India from contesting then ongoing Assembly and Parliamentary polls, for their failure to furnish expenditure details incurred during elections on different occasions earlier, while contesting Parliamentary and Assembly polls.
