= N. Jothi =

Indian politician

N. Jothi is an Indian politician who changed allegiance in 2008 from the All India Anna Dravida Munnetra Kazhagam party to the Dravida Munnetra Kazhagam party. He has been a Member of the Parliament of India representing Tamil Nadu in the Rajya Sabha, which is its upper house.
