= Belinda Parmar =

British businesswoman and corporate activist

Belinda Parmar OBE
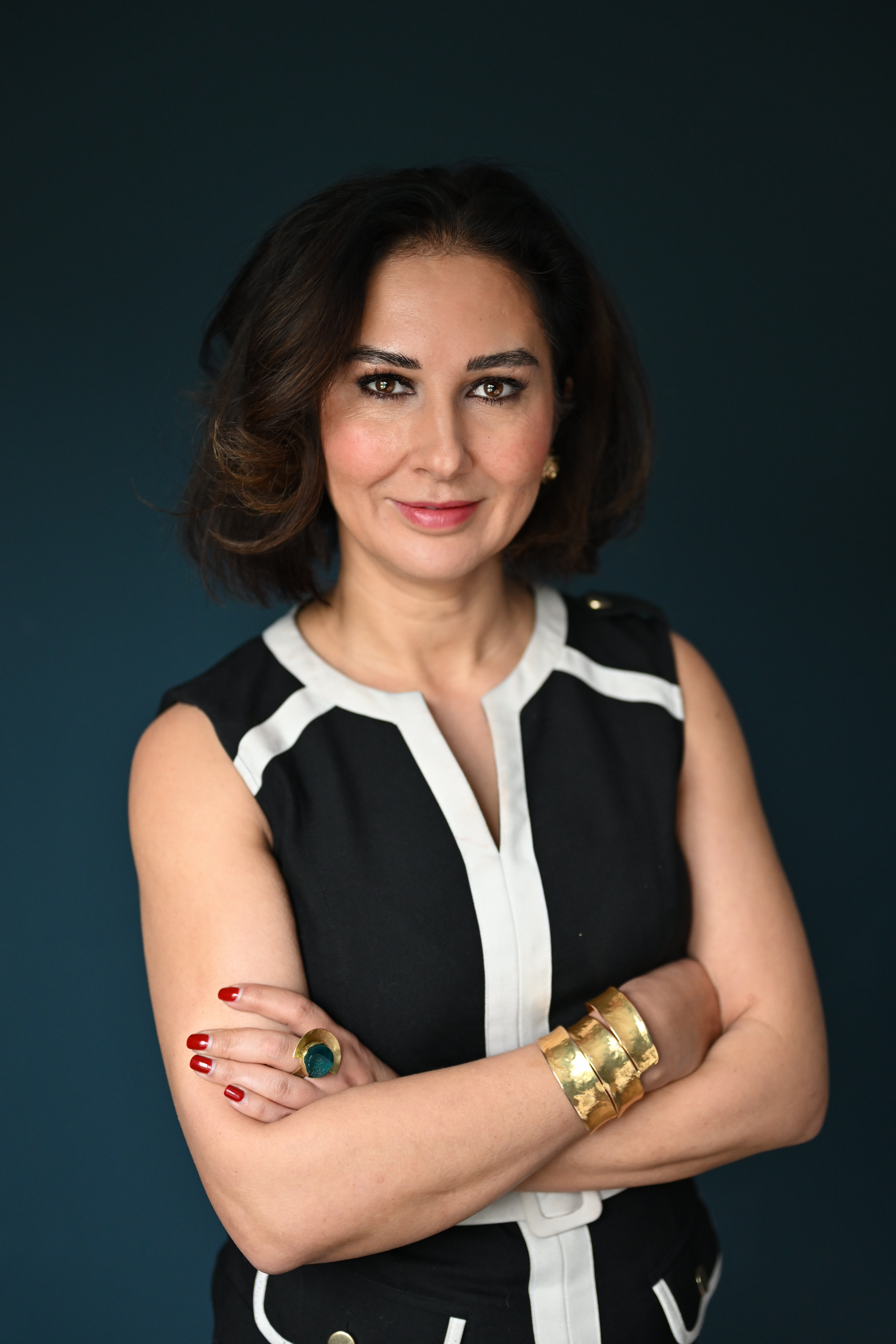
- Born: 12 March 1974 (age 52)
- Occupations: CEO and Campaigner
- Website: theempathybusiness.com

Belinda Parmar, OBE (born 12 March 1974), is a British entrepreneur, barrister, campaigner and corporate activist.

Parmar is the founder and CEO of "The Empathy Business", formerly known as "Lady Geek", a consultancy business that "embeds empathy into companies" and has published an annual "Global Empathy Index" in the Harvard Business Review which claims a causal relationship between corporate empathy and commercial performance. In 2018, Parmar stated “it may take a pandemic to end our relationship with junk tech. She claimed that technology is having a negative impact on mental health and compared social media to fast food calling it “junk tech” that requires “no cognitive effort”, despite having previously been described as "the high priestess of tech empowerment".

Parmar led the Little Miss Geek campaign, supported by forty MPs, which aimed to inspire women to follow careers oriented towards technology.

She now serves as a Non-Executive Director on the Ministry of Defence Service Justice Board, contributing to oversight of the military justice system.

== Early Life & Education ==
Parmar grew up in Essex and studied French and Spanish at the University of Manchester. She later completed executive education programmes at Saïd Business School, Oxford, and Cambridge Judge Business School.

In her forties, Parmar pursued legal training, completing the Graduate Diploma in Law at the University of Law and the Bar Professional Training Course at BPP University, qualifying as a barrister with distinction in 2024.

== Campaigning ==
Her campaign against “junk tech” provides support for parents, including workshops. As part of this campaign, Parmar has stated that "we no longer control technology: it controls us", "we have become slaves to technology" and talks about the dangers of "junk technology", comparing the effects of too much technology to the ill-effects of junk food. She aims to "hold to account the tech giants who are profiting from our over-engagement".

Parmar's previous campaigning mission, through Lady Geek, was "to end the stereotyping and patronising of women within the technology" and the “pink it & shrink it” approach of selling to women.

== Honours, Awards & Press ==
Parmar was appointed Officer of the Order of the British Empire (OBE) in the 2014 Birthday Honours for services to women in technology.

In 2014 Parmar was included in the World Economic Forum's List of Young Global Leaders and was named one of Business Insider Australia's "100 Most Influential Tech Women on Twitter". In October 2014 she was placed in Fortune's "55 most influential women on Twitter". In June 2015 Parmar was named by The Guardian "one of the UK's leading campaigners to get more women into tech". In 2017 she was included in The Cranfield Female FTSE Board Report '100 Women to Watch 2017'. Parmar is listed in the Computer Weekly Most Influential Women in Tech 2018.

In 2020, Parmar was voted one of Top 20 Global Diversity figures in public life for "bridging the gap in representation of women in tech and STEM".

=== Publications ===
Parmar has published extensively on empathy, leadership, and the ethical implications of technology. Her work has appeared in the Harvard Business Review, Financial Times, and other business publications.

Parmar was featured in the Financial Times in March 2025, discussing the role of Empathy and AI in Customer Service, stating that the goal of AI should be to "enhance human connection, not replace." She was further featured in the Financial Times Advisor in October 2025, outlining the way AI will work with humans in the workplace, through her 'Head, Heart and Hands' framework.
