= Mukesh Rathwa =

Indian politician and Rajya Sabha member from Gujarat

Member of Parliament, Rajya Sabha
- Incumbent
- Assumed office 21 June 2026
- Preceded by: Ramilaben Bara
- Constituency: Gujarat

Personal details
- Born: Chhota Udaipur district, Gujarat,India
- Party: Bharatiya Janata Party
- Education: MA,,M.ED,LLB
- Occupation: Politician

Mukesh Rathwa is an Indian politician from the Bharatiya Janata Party. He is a Member of Parliament, representing Gujarat in the Rajya Sabha, the upper house of India's Parliament since June 2026.
