= N. P. Durga =

Indian politician

N. P. Durga Ramakrishna, a politician originally from the Telugu Desam Party, was a Member of the Parliament of India who represented Andhra Pradesh in the Rajya Sabha, the upper house of the Parliament. In 2021, she joined the BJP.
