= Maneklal Chunilal Shah =

Indian politician

Member of Parliament Rajya Sabha
- In office 1962-1968
- Constituency: Bombay State

Personal details
- Born: December 1896
- Party: Indian National Congress
- Spouse: Taraben

Maneklal Chunilal Shah was an Indian politician. He was a Member of Parliament, representing Gujarat in the Rajya Sabha the upper house of India's Parliament representing the Indian National Congress.
