= Sagar Rayka =

Indian politician

Member of Parliament, Rajya Sabha
- In office 1986-1988
- Constituency: Gujarat

Personal details
- Party: Bharatiy Janta Party
- Spouse: Neela Rayka

Sagar Rayka is an Indian politician.

== Professional career ==
He was a Member of Parliament, representing Gujarat in the Rajya Sabha the upper house of India's Parliament as a member of the Indian National Congress.
