= Isham Singh =

Indian politician

Shri Isham Singh an Indian politician from the Bahujan Samaj Party was a former Member of the Parliament of India representing Uttar Pradesh in the Rajya Sabha, the upper house of the Indian Parliament.
