= Praful Goradia =

Indian politician

Prafull Goradia

MP of Rajya Sabha
- In office 1998–2000

Personal details
- Born: 27 March 1937 Vadodara, Gujarat
- Party: Bharatiya Janata Party

Praful Dwarkadas Goradia, a politician from Akhil Bharatiya Jan Sangh party. He was a member of the Parliament of India representing Gujarat in the Rajya Sabha, the upper house of the Parliament, from 1998 to 2000 as member of Bharatiya Janata Party. Currently, he is general secretary of the Akhil Bharatiya Jan Sangh.
