= Kusum Rai =

Indian politician

Kusum Rai (born 14 August 1968) is an Indian politician. She is a member of the Rajya Sabha, the upper house of the Indian Parliament.

She is a leader of the Bharatiya Janata Party. She is a senior woman leader of the Bharatiya Janata Party and a former chairperson of the UP Women Commission and also the national vice-president of the party's Mahila Morcha. She is the protégé of Kalyan Singh whom she considers like her father and calls him Babuji but has parted ways with him. Earlier she was also the Cabinet Minister of Public Works Department in the Government of Uttar Pradesh.
