= T. K. Rangarajan =

Indian politician and trade unionist

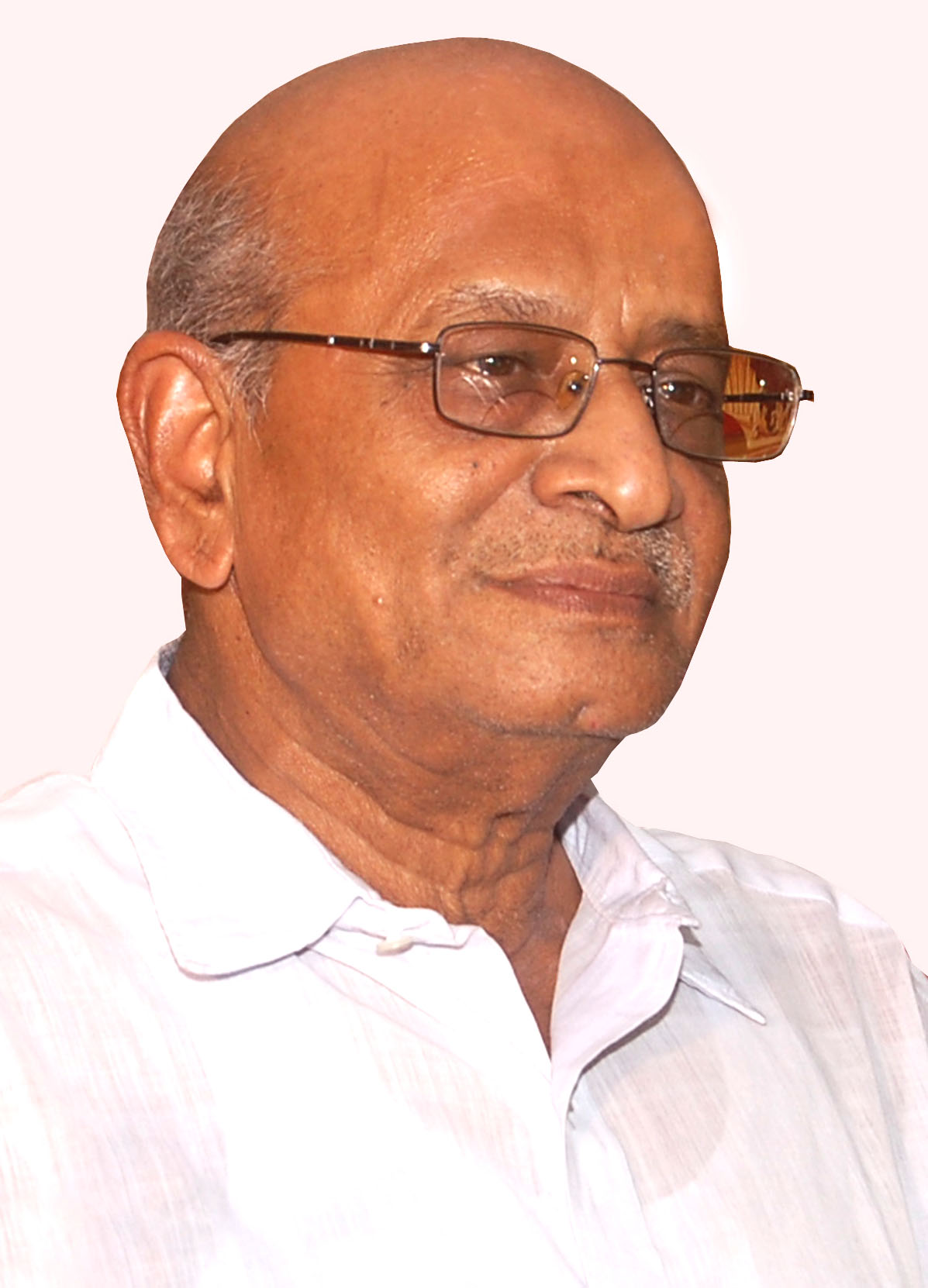

MP of Rajya Sabha for Tamil Nadu
- In office 3 April 2008 – 2 April 2020
- Constituency: Tamil Nadu

Personal details
- Born: 30 September 1941 (age 84) Madurai, Madras Presidency, British India
- Party: Communist Party of India (Marxist)
- Spouse: Vijaya Rangarajan
- Children: 2

T. K. Rangarajan (born 30 September 1941) is an Indian communist politician and trade unionist. He is a Central Committee member of the Communist Party of India (Marxist), Tamil Nadu State Executive Committee member of CPI(M), All India Vice-president of the Centre of Indian Trade Unions.

He is a member of Rajya sabha from Tamil Nadu for two terms. He is the Leader of the Parliamentary group of CPI(M) in Rajya Sabha, since the retirement of Sitaram Yechury, the General Secretary of the party, from the Rajya Sabha.
