= Renubala Pradhan =

Indian politician

Member of Parliament, Rajya Sabha
- In office 2008-2014
- Constituency: Odisha

Personal details
- Born: 10 May 1964 (age 61) Takarada, Ganjam Orissa
- Party: Biju Janata Dal
- Spouse: Rajendra Nath Pradhan
- Children: One son and one daughter
- As of August 13, 2012

Renubala Pradhan is an Indian politician from the Biju Janata Dal party.

She was a Member of the Parliament of India representing Orissa in the Rajya Sabha, the upper house of the Indian Parliament.
