= Jayantilal Barot =

Indian politician

Jayantilal Barot (24 August 1942 - 23 September 2017) was a politician from Bharatiya Janata Party and a member of the Parliament of India representing Gujarat in the Rajya Sabha, the upper house of the Indian Parliament during 10/04/2002 to 09/04/2008. He was chairman of Gujarat Backward Class Corporation till 2017.
