= Maharashtra State Financial Corporation =

State agency in Maharashtra, India

Maharashtra State Financial Corporation (MSFC) is the term lending development financial institution in Maharashtra state in India. It provides finance to small and medium scale enterprises. It was set up by Government of Maharashtra in 1962.
