= Dara Hormusji Variava =

Indian politician

Member of Parliament Rajya Sabha
- In office 1952-1960
- Constituency: Bombay State

Personal details
- Born: 5 July 1897
- Died: 1961 (aged 63–64)
- Party: Indian National Congress
- Spouse: Piloo Navroji Kalyanvala

Dara Hormusji Variava was an Indian politician. He was a Member of Parliament, representing Gujarat in the Rajya Sabha the upper house of India's Parliament representing the Indian National Congress.

== See also ==
- Variav
