= Raju Parmar =

Indian politician

Member of Parliament, Rajya Sabha
- In office 1988-2006
- Constituency: Gujarat

Personal details
- Born: 27 June 1950 (age 75)
- Party: Indian National Congress (till 2022); Bharatiya Janata Party(2022―)
- Spouse: Neela Rajubhai Parmar

Raju Parmar (born 27 June 1950) is an Indian politician. He was a Member of Parliament, representing Gujarat in the Rajya Sabha the upper house of India's Parliament as a member of the Indian National Congress(INC). In August 2022, he left INC and joined Bharatiya Janata Party (BJP).
