= Vasanthi Stanley =

Indian politician, journalist, and writer (1962–2019)

Member of Parliament, Rajya Sabha
- In office 2008-2014
- Constituency: Tamil Nadu

Personal details
- Born: 8 May 1962 Devakottai, Tamil Nadu
- Died: 27 April 2019 (aged 56) Chennai
- Party: DMK
- Spouse: Stanley Rajan
- As of 27 May, 2009

Vasanthi Stanley (8 May 1962 – 27 April 2019) was an Indian politician, journalist and writer. She was member of the Parliament of India representing Tamil Nadu in the Rajya Sabha, the upper house of the Indian Parliament from the Dravida Munnetra Kazhagam party. She died in a Chennai hospital after a brief illness on 27 April 2019, at age 56.
