= Mohd. Ali Khan =

Indian politician

Member of Parliament, Rajya Sabha
- In office 10 April 2008 – 9 April 2020
- Constituency: Andhra Pradesh

Personal details
- Born: 1 January 1948 (age 77) Rudrur, Nizamabad district, Telangana
- Political party: INC

Mohd. Ali Khan (born 1 January 1948 in Rudrur, Nizamabad district, Telangana) is a politician from the Indian National Congress (INC) party. He was first elected to the Rajya Sabha from the state of Andhra Pradesh on the INC ticket in April 2008. In 2013, he was appointed as Whip for the INC in the Rajya Sabha. He continued to represent Andhra Pradesh in the Rajya Sabha after its re-organization on 2 June 2014.
