= Ram Prakash =

Indian politician (1939–2023)

Member of Parliament, Rajya Sabha
- In office 2007–2014
- Constituency: Haryana

Personal details
- Born: 5 October 1939 Tangore, Kurukshetra district, Punjab Province, British India
- Died: 13 December 2023 (aged 84) Kurukshetra, Haryana, India
- Party: Indian National Congress
- Spouse: Vijay Kumari
- Education: Panjab University; Charles University, Prague
- Profession: Vedic Scholar, Author, Editor, Educationist, Politician

Ram Prakash (5 October 1939 – 13 December 2023) was a Vedic scholar, author, educationist and a member of the Parliament of India representing Haryana in the Rajya Sabha, the upper house of the Indian Parliament from 2007 to 2014.

He authored and edited books on Vedic philosophy and was the second Chairperson of the 'Centre for Studies in Civilizations'. He was a professor of Chemistry, a Fulbright scholar, and the Chancellor of Gurukula Kangri University, Haridwar.

== Early life ==
Ram Prakash, son of Sh. Prabhu Dayal, was born on 5 October 1939, in the village of Tangore, Kurukshetra district of Haryana (formerly Punjab), India, of OBC (Other Backward Castes). Prakash gained his MSc and PhD degrees in Chemistry from the Punjab University, Chandigarh, and subsequently taught at the institution. Later, he joined the new Kurukshetra University as the Pro-Vice Chancellor for a while.

== Politics ==
Prakash entered politics in 1990–1991 and in 1999 won the local elections on an Indian National Congress (INC) party ticket. Being close to the Haryana Chief Minister, Bhupinder Singh Hooda, he eventually rose to be Working President of the INC party in Haryana and was elevated to the Rajya Sabha in 2007.

== Personal life and death ==
In 1966 Prakash married SM. Vijay Kumari, and had two sons by his marriage. He lived mostly in Kurukshetra, Haryana, and also at New Delhi.

Ram Prakash died on 13 December 2023, at the age of 84.

== Positions held ==
Year	Position	Party/Organisation
1991–1996	M.L.A, Thanesar	INC
1991–1993	State Minister for Science, Technology and Electronics	INC
2005	Working President, Haryana Pradesh Congress Committee	INC
2007–2008	Member of Parliament, Rajya Sabha	INC
2007 – present	Member, Committee on Rural Development	INC
2008	Member, Committee on External Affairs Member	INC
2008 – 2014	Re-Elected as M.P., Rajya Sabha	INC
2010	Member, Committee on Official Language	INC
