= Chunibhai K Gohel =

Indian politician

Chunibhai Kanjibhai Gohel

MP of Rajya Sabha for Gujarat
- In office 10 April 2014 – 9 April 2020
- Constituency: Gujarat

Personal details
- Born: May 19, 1955 (age 70) Veraval, Gujarat, India
- Party: Bharatiya Janata Party
- Profession: Politician

Chunibhai Kanjibhai Gohel (born 19 May 1955 Veravel district, GJ ) is an Indian politician of the Bharatiya Janata Party. Since April 2014, he is the member of the Parliament of India representing Gujarat State in the Rajya Sabha, the upper house.
