= Tarini Kanta Roy =

Indian politician

Tarini Kanta Roy, a politician from Communist Party of India (Marxist), was a member of the Parliament of India representing West Bengal in the Rajya Sabha, the upper house of the Indian Parliament, from 4 March 2008 to 4 February 2014.
