= Natubhai Thakore =

Indian politician

Natubhai Thakore (b 1 June 1960 Vadavi, Ta.-Kadi, Mehsana district, Gujarat ) is a member of Rajya Sabha and a leader of Bharatiya Janata Party. He was elected to Rajya Sabha from Gujarat in 2008.

He is Member of Committee on Petroleum and Natural Gas and Aug. 2012 onwards Member of Committee on Social Justice and Empowerment.

== Positions held ==
- April 2008 Elected to Rajya Sabha
- May 2008 - May 2009 Member, Committee on Industry
- Aug. 2009 onwards Member, Committee on Industry
- Aug. 2009 onwards Member, Consultative Committee for the Ministry of Heavy Industries and Public Enterprises
- May 2012 onwards Member, Committee on Welfare of Other Backward Classes
