= Prasanta Chatterjee =

Indian politician

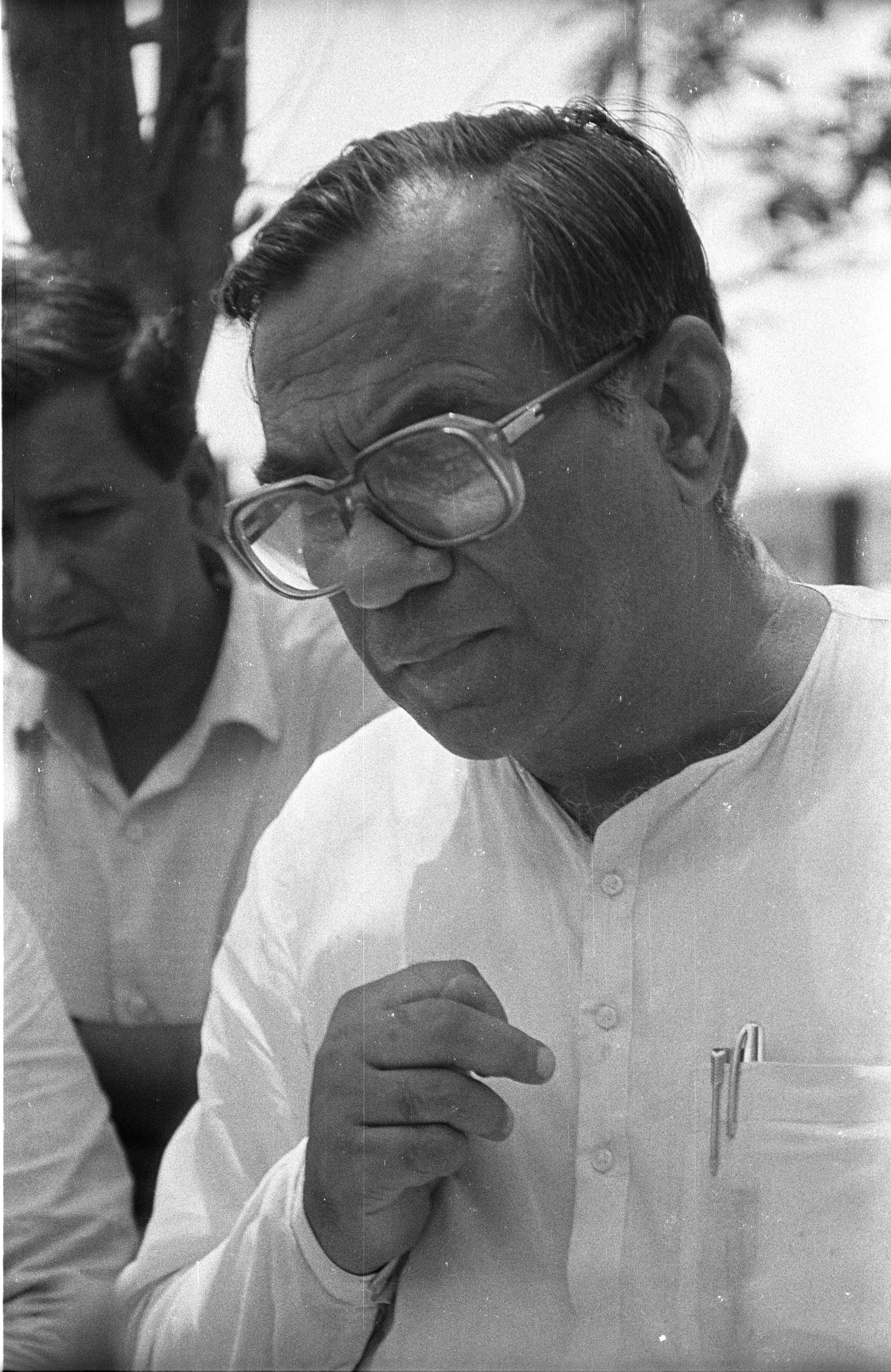
- Chatterjee in 1993

34th Mayor of Kolkata
- In office 30 July 1990 – 12 July 2000
- Preceded by: Kamal Kumar Basu
- Succeeded by: Subrata Mukherjee

Prasanta Chatterjee, a politician from Communist Party of India (Marxist), is a Member of the Parliament of India representing West Bengal in the Rajya Sabha, the upper house of the Parliament.
