= Bharatsinh Parmar =

Indian politician

Member of Parliament, Rajya Sabha
- In office 2008–2014

General Secretary of Gujarat State BJP
- In office 2016–2020

Chairman of Gujarat State Rural Development
- In office 1995–1997

Chairman of Gujarat State Police Housing Corporation
- In office 1998–2002

Bharatsinh Parmar is an Indian politician. He is a former member of the Rajya Sabha and a leader of the Bharatiya Janata Party. He was elected to Rajya Sabha from Gujarat in 2008.
