= Alka Balram Kshatriya =

Indian politician

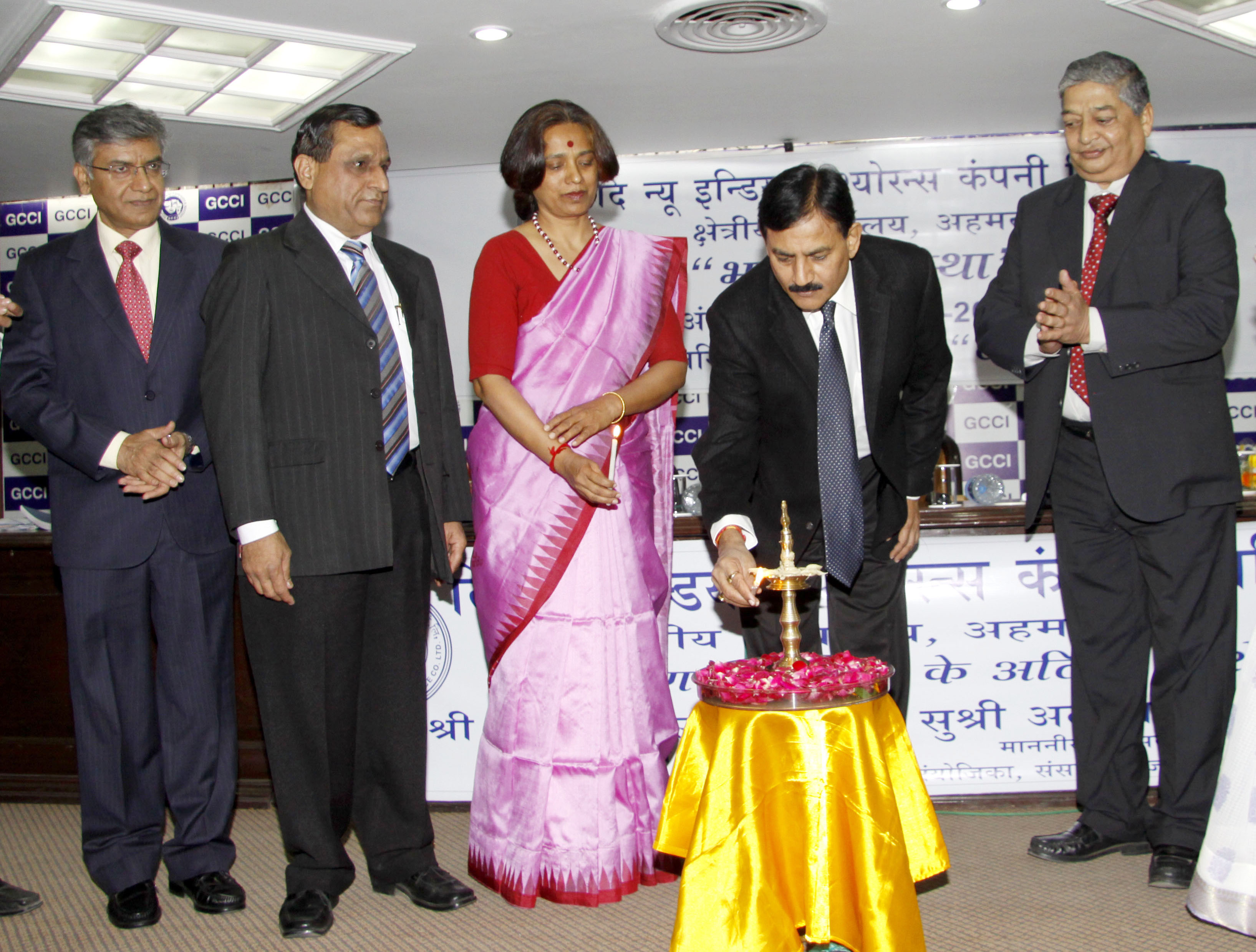
Kshatriya in 2011 (third from left)

Alka Balram Kshatriya (born 7 November 1959), a politician from Indian National Congress party, is a Member of the Parliament of India representing Gujarat in the Rajya Sabha, the upper house of the Parliament.
