= Jashubhai Dhanabhai Barad =

Indian politician

Member of Parliament, Lok Sabha
- In office 2004–2009
- Preceded by: Bhavna Chikhalia
- Succeeded by: Dinubhai Solanki
- Constituency: Junagadh Lok Sabha constituency

Member of Gujarat Legislative Assembly
- In office (1990-1995), (1995-1998), (2002-2007), (2012-2014), (2014 – 2017)
- Preceded by: Baloch M. F.
- Succeeded by: Vimal Chudasama
- Constituency: Somnath
- In office (1995-1998), (1998-2002), (2012 – 2016)
- Preceded by: Jethalal Ranabhai Jora
- Succeeded by: Govindbhai Parmar; Bhagabhai Dhanabhai Barad
- Constituency: Talala

Personal details
- Born: 15 September 1955 Badalpara Veraval, Junagadh District
- Died: 25 January 2016 (aged 60) Ahmedabad, Gujarat
- Party: Bharatiya Janata Party (2014-2016)
- Other political affiliations: Indian National Congress (1995-2014); Rashtriya Janata Party (1996-1998); Janata Dal (1990-1995)
- Spouse: Ramaben Barad
- Children: Shailesh Barad (son) Hiren Barad (son) & 2 daughters
- Relatives: Bhagabhai Dhanabhai Barad (brother)
- As of 20 February

Jashubhai Dhanabhai Barad (15 September 1955 – 25 January 2016) was an Indian politician from Gujarat. He served as a member of Parliament in the 14th Lok Sabha, representing the Junagadh constituency and member of Gujarat Legislative Assembly from Somnath and Talala

== Early life ==
He belonged to the Yadav (Ahir) community, and his family hailed from Badalpara village near Veraval. Jashubhai was also known as lion of saurastra and lion of sorath (Sorath no savaj).

== Career ==
He was elected to Lok Sabha in 2004 Indian general election and represented Junagadh.

He was twice elected to Gujarat legislative assembly in 1990 and 1995 from Somnath constituency and became Cabinet Minister for water resources and irrigation. He was also twice elected to Gujarat legislative assembly in 1998 and in 2012 from Talala Gir constituency. He served as a Member of Parliament in the 14th Lok Sabha, representing the Junagadh constituency as a member of the Indian National Congress then again in Gujarat Assembly By-Election, as a member of the Bharatiya Janata Party after quitting in Congress Party in 2014.He was also a Cabinet Minister in the Gujarat state government, holding the portfolio of Water Resources and Irrigation. He was sworn as Minister of State for Agriculture, Civil aviation in Anandiben Patel cabinet in 2014.

He died on 25 January 2016 at Ahmedabad following brain tumour. After his death, his brother Bhagvanjibhai Barad was elected with 31,000 margin against BJP candidate Govindbhai Parmar.
