= Chudasama =

Chudasama may refer to:

- Chudasama dynasty, an Indian dynasty in medieval Gujarat
- Chudasama (Rajput clan), a Rajput clan of Gujarat, India
- Chudasama (Mer clan), a Mer clan of Gujarat, India
- Chudasama (surname), an Indian surname

== See also ==
- Chuda (disambiguation)
- Chud (disambiguation)
- Sama (disambiguation)
- Samma (disambiguation)
