= Chudasama (surname) =

Chudasama is an Indian surname of Hindu origin. It is found caste groups of the Gujarat state in India, including the Rajput, Mer, Mochi, and Bhangi (Chuhra).

== People with surname ==
Some individuals with Chudasama surname include:

- Bhupendrasinh Chudasama, Indian politician
- Nehal Chudasama, Indian model
- Manul Chudasama, Indian actress
- Dipak Chudasama, Cricketer
- Rajesh Chudasama, Indian politician
- Nana Chudasama, Mayor of Mumbai
- Vimal Chudasama, Indian politician
- Abhay Chudasama, Indian police officer
- Krishna Chudasama, Norwegian politician
- Shaina Nana Chudasama, Indian fashion designer, politician, and social worker.
- Yuvraj Chudasama, Indian Cricketer
- Chandrika Chudasama, Indian politician
