= Bhesan =

Bhesan can refer to three places in India.

- Bhesan subdistrict, Junagadh district § Divisions
- Bhesan, Surat, List of villages in India § Gujarat
- Bhesan village, Junagadh
