= Mansingh Parmar =

Indian politician

Member of Parliament, Rajya Sabha
- Incumbent
- Assumed office 21 June 2026
- Preceded by: Narhari Amin
- Constituency: Gujarat

Personal details
- Born: 11 August 1980 (age 46)
- Party: Bharatiya Janata Party
- Occupation: Politician

Mansingh Parmar (born 11 August 1980) is an Indian politician from the Bharatiya Janata Party. He is a sitting Member of Parliament, representing Gujarat in the Rajya Sabha, the upper house of India's Parliament since June 2026. He had earlier contested the 2022 Gujarat Legislative Assembly election from the Somnath Assembly constituency, and had lost to the Indian National Congress's candidate Vimal Chudasama by a small margin. Parmar was an active member of the Akhil Bharatiya Vidyarthi Parishad from 1999 to 2004; he served as the vice president of the Gujarat unit of the Bharatiya Janata Yuva Morcha between 2010 and 2012. Between 2020 and 2022 he was the president of the BJP's Gir Somnath district unit. At the time of his election to the Rajya Sabha, Parmar was serving as the president of the BJP OBC Morcha in Gujarat.
