= Rajeshbhai Chudasama =

Indian politician

Rajeshbhai Naranbhai Chudasama
- રાજેશભાઈ નારાનભાઈ ચુડાસમા
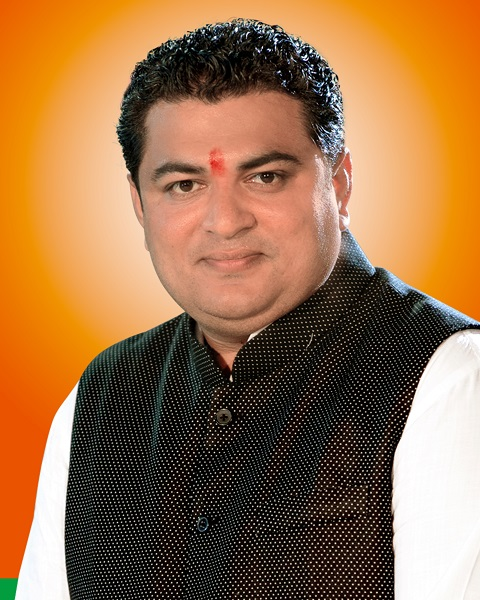
- Rajeshbhai Naranbhai Chudasama

Member of Parliament, Lok Sabha
- Incumbent
- Assumed office (2014-2019), (2019-2024), (2024-Present)
- Preceded by: Dinu Solanki
- Constituency: Junagadh

Member of Gujarat Legislative Assembly
- In office 2012–2014
- Preceded by: Bhagvanjibhai Karagatiya
- Succeeded by: Babubhai Vaja
- Constituency: Mangrol

Personal details
- Born: Rajesh Chudasama; 10 April 1982 (age 44) Chorwad, Junagadh, Gujarat
- Party: Bharatiya Janata Party
- Spouse: Smt. Rekhaben Rajeshbhai Chudasama (m. 18 April 2008)
- Children: 1
- Parent(s): Shri Naranbhai R. Chudasama (father), Smt. Lakhiben Naranbhai Chudasama (mother)
- Occupation: Agriculturist
- Profession: Politician
- As of 14 December, 2016

Rajeshbhai Naranbhai Chudasama (born 10 April 1982) is Member of Parliament from Junagadh-Gir Somnath, Gujarat (Lok Sabha). He was previously a Member of the Gujarat Legislative Assembly (MLA). He was elected from Mangrol in Junagadh district as a candidate of the Bharatiya Janata Party (BJP) in 2012. He has won the 2014 Lok Sabha election from Junagadh Lok Sabha constituency. He belongs to the Koli caste of Gujarat.

== Positions held ==
- 2012 - May 2014, Member of Gujarat Legislative Assembly
- May 2014, Elected to 16th Lok Sabha
- 1 Sep. 2014 - 25 May 2019, Member of Standing Committee on Transport, Tourism and Culture
- Member of Consultative Committee, Ministry of Agriculture
- May 2019, Re-elected to 17th Lok Sabha (2nd term)
- 13 Sept. 2019 onwards, Member of Standing Committee on Chemicals & Fertilisers
- Member of Consultative Committee, Ministry of Chemicals and Fertilisers
- June 2024, Re-elected to 18th Lok Sabha (3rd term)
