= Shantipura =

Village in Gujarat, India

Coordinates: 21.0261°N 70.316314°E

Shantipura is a village in Malia tehsil, Junagadh district, Gujarat, India. Its last reported population was 1,973 in 2011. Shantipura is believed by some to be the place where the ancient Shudra community of Kshatriyas first took its place as the warriors of the Koli warrior elite, although the origins of the Kolis seem to be forgotten.
