= Bhuvavada =

Bhavavada or Bhuavada is a village in Sutrapada Taluka of Gir Somnath district in Gujarat, India.

== History ==
The population of this village is ascribed to Raja Bhuvad of the Bhuvatimbi inscription. The village lies about sixteen miles north-east of Sutrapada and about three and a half miles to the north of Bhuritimbi.

There are old monuments dating from Samvat 1400- 1500 in its lands which shows the village to be of about the same date as Bhuatimbi. The buildings and ruins in the village lands such as stepwells, and the remains of a fort with gates, as well as the actual extent of the lands is about 2000 acres, show that it must once have been a large and populous village in past.

== Demography ==
In 1872, the entire population was seventy-six persons, but it was almost depopulated by the famine of 1878-79 and in 1881 the population had sunk to seventeen souls. It has been repopulated on a new site by the name of Bahadurpura.

== Geography ==
The Memati stream joins the Surmat river about a mile from this village. The water of the Memati is very deleterious to health.
