= Mangrol, Junagadh Assembly constituency =

Legislative Assembly constituency in Gujarat State, India

Coordinates: 21.12°N 70.12°E

Mangrol
- Constituency No. 89 for the Gujarat Legislative Assembly

Constituency details
- Country: India
- Region: Western India
- State: Gujarat
- District: Junagadh
- Lok Sabha constituency: Junagadh
- Established: 2007
- Total electors: 230,886
- Reservation: None

Member of Legislative Assembly
- 15th Gujarat Legislative Assembly
- Incumbent Bhagvanjibhai Karagatiya
- Party: Bharatiya Janata Party
- Elected year: 2022

Mangrol is one of the 182 Legislative Assembly constituencies of Gujarat state in India. It is part of Junagadh district.

== List of segments ==
This assembly seat represents the following segments,

1. Malia-Hatina Taluka
2. Mangrol Taluka (Part) Villages – Arena, Dhelana, Husenabad, Jamvali, Juthal, Khodada, Kotda Juna, Kotda Nava, Lambora, Lathodra, Maktupur, Mangrol (M), Mankhetra, Sakrana, Shaikhpur, Shapur, Shepa, Sheriyakhan, Sheriyaj, Virpur, Kankasa

== Members of Legislative Assembly ==
Year	Member	Party
1967	N. P. Gandhi	Independent politician
1972	Ayashabegun Mohmedali Sheikh	Indian National Congress
1975	Jethabhai Ranabhai Jora	Indian National Congress
1980	Sukabhai Antrolia	Independent politician
1985	Dr. Chandrika Chudasama	Indian National Congress
1990	Dr. Chandrika Chudasama	Indian National Congress
1995	Dr. Chandrika Chudasama	Indian National Congress
1998	Bhagvanjibhai Karagatiya	Bharatiya Janata Party
2002	Dr. Chandrika Chudasama	Indian National Congress
2007	Bhagvanjibhai Karagatiya	Bharatiya Janata Party
2012	Rajeshbhai Chudasama	Bharatiya Janata Party
2014^	Babubhai Kalabhai Vaja	Indian National Congress
2017	Babubhai Kalabhai Vaja	Indian National Congress
2022	Bhagvanjibhai Karagatiya	Bharatiya Janata Party

^ : bypoll

== Election results ==
=== 2022 ===
Gujarat Assembly election, 2022:Mangrol, Junagadh Assembly constituency
Party	Candidate	Votes	%	±%
BJP	Bhagvanjibhai Karagatiya	60,896	41.21	
INC	Babubhai Kalabhai Vaja	38,395	25.98	
AAP	Piyush Parmar	34,314	23.22	
NOTA	None of the above	1,760	1.19	
Majority			15.23	
Turnout				
Registered electors		227,339		
BJP gain from INC		Swing		

=== 2017 ===
Gujarat Legislative Assembly Election, 2017: Mangrol (Junagadh)
Party	Candidate	Votes	%	±%
INC	Babubhai Kalabhai Vaja	71,654	53.80	
BJP	Kargatiya Bhagvanjibhai Lakhabhai	57,740	43.40	
Independent	Sanjaykumar Kantibhai Chandegara	1,938	1.50	
NOTA	None of the Above			
Majority		13,914	10.40	
Turnout		1,33,195	66.30	
Registered electors		206,403		
INC hold				

=== 2014 ===
2014 Gujarat Legislative Assembly by-election: Mangrol
Party	Candidate	Votes	%	±%
INC	Babubhai Kalabhai Vaja	66,498	58.59	
BJP	Laxmanbhai Yadav	43,816	38.61	
Independent	Vaja Babubhai	1,549	1.36	
None of the Above	None of the Above	1,626	1.43	
Majority		22,682	19.99	
Turnout		113,489		
Swing to INC from BJP		Swing		

== See also ==
- List of constituencies of Gujarat Legislative Assembly
- Gujarat Legislative Assembly
