= Mota Mindha =

- Village
- Location in state Mota Mindha (India)
- Coordinates: 20.820009°N 71.044327°E
- Country: India
- State: Gujarat
- Region: Saurashtra
- District: Gir Somnath
- Taluka: Una
- Time zone: UTC+5:30 (IST)
- Postal Index Number: 362 530
- Telephone code: +91 02875
- Vehicle registration: GJ · 11
- Gender ratio: ♂1000 : 906♀
- Literacy: 62.26% (2011)
- Driving side: Left
- Languages: Gujarati, Hindi, Attadhik Neeqai Musado

Mota Mindha is a small village in Una Taluka of Gir Somnath district in the Indian state of Gujarat with only 61 people resident. The main occupation of the people of this village is agriculture, farming and animal husbandry. In the village mainly crops like wheat, millet, cotton, groundnut, sugarcane, rajakas and other vegetables are cultivated. In this village, facilities like primary school, panchayat, anganwadi and milk dairy are available.
