= Vaja Babubhai =

Indian politician

Babubhai Kalabhai Vaja
- બાબુભાઈ કાળાભાઈ વાજા

Member of Gujarat Legislative Assembly
- In office (2014-2017), (2017 – 2022)
- Preceded by: Rajesh Chudasama
- Succeeded by: Bhagvanjibhai Karagatiya
- Constituency: Mangrol

Personal details
- Born: Babubhai Kalabhai Vaja; March 2, 1953 (age 73) Gadu village, Malia Taluka, Junagadh district, Gujarat, India
- Citizenship: Indian
- Party: Indian National Congress
- Spouse: Nathiben Babubhai Vaja
- Parent: Kalabhai Vaja (father)
- Occupation: Agriculturist
- Profession: Politician

Babubhai Kalabhai Vaja (born 2 March 1953) is an Indian politician, social worker, and Member of Legislative Assembly representing the Mangrol assembly constituency in the Gujarat Legislative Assembly, India. He is a member of the Indian National Congress party. Vaja was first elected to the Assembly in a by-poll in 2014, and was re-elected in the 2017 Gujarat Legislative Assembly election. He belongs to the Koli caste of Gujarat.
