= Joshipura =

- city
- Location in Gujarat, India Joshipura (India)
- Coordinates: 21.55711°N 70.44772°E
- Country: India
- State: Gujarat
- District: Junagadh

Population (2001)
  - Total: 28,756

Languages
  - Official: Gujarati, Hindi
- Time zone: UTC+5:30 (IST)
- Vehicle registration: GJ
- Website: gujaratindia.com

Joshipura is a city and a municipality in Junagadh district in the Indian state of Gujarat.

== Demographics ==
As of 2001 India census, Joshipura had a population of 28,757. Males constitute 52% of the population and females 48%. Joshipura has an average literacy rate of 78%, higher than the national average of 59.5%: male literacy is 82%, and female literacy is 74%. In Joshipura, 12% of the population is under 6 years of age.

The city is well connected with the state highway.
