= Gita Patel =

Indian politician

Member of the Gujarat Legislative Assembly
- In office 2007–2012
- Preceded by: Jitendrabhai Patel
- Succeeded by: Arvind Patel Dalal
- Constituency: Sabarmati

Personal details
- Party: Bhartiya Janata Party

Gita Patel is a Member of Legislative assembly from Sabarmati constituency in Gujarat for its 12th legislative assembly.
