= Yatinbhai Oza =

Indian politician

Member of the Gujarat Legislative Assembly
- In office 1995–2001
- Preceded by: Narhari Amin
- Succeeded by: Narhari Amin
- Constituency: Sabarmati

Personal details
- Party: Bharatiya Janata Party

Yatin Narendrabhai Oza is an Indian politician. Oza was twice Member of the Gujarat Legislative Assembly from Sabarmati from 1995 to 2001 as a Bharatiya Janata Party candidate. He resigned from Bharatiya Janata Party and contested election against Narendra Modi from Maninagar as Indian National Congress where he lost. He returned to Bharatiya Janata Party in 2012. Later, he joined Aam Aadmi Party in presence of Arvind Kejriwal in New Delhi and accused Prime Minister Narendra Modi promoting corruption in the country. Oza is a practising senior lawyer at Gujarat High Court. He was considered a mentor of Amit Shah who later became Home Minister in the Narendra Modi cabinet. He is a designated senior advocate and serving President of Gujarat High court Bar Association since 14 consecutive terms. Gujarat High Court has recently stripped of his designation of Senior Advocate in contempt proceeding initiated after his controversial allegations of preferential treatment to senior advocates and law firms in case listing against the registry of the Gujarat High Court. However, his Senior Advocate's designation has been given back by the Supreme Court of India for 2 years from January 2022.
