= Jethabhai Ranabhai Jora =

Indian politician from Gujarat

Member of Gujarat Legislative Assembly for Talala Assembly constituency
- In office 1990–1995
- Preceded by: Arshibhai Punjabhai Zala
- Succeeded by: Jesabhai Bhanabhai Barad
- Constituency: Talala

Personal details
- Born: Jethabhai Ranabhai Jora Talala, Gujarat, India
- Citizenship: India
- Party: Indian National Congress
- Occupation: Politician

Jethabhai Ranabhai Jora (also spelled Jethalal Jora) is an Indian politician, social worker and vice president of Gujarat Pradesh Congress Committee.

He is also the former president of Junagadh Congress and former member of Gujarat Legislative Assembly for Junagadh Assembly constituency and Talala Assembly constituency as a member of Indian National Congress.
