= Bhuvatimbi =

Bhuvatimbi or Bhuva Timbi is a village in Sutrapada Taluka in Gir Somnath district of Gujarat state, India. It is located 86 km south of Junagadh, 23 km from Sutrapada, and 386 km from the State capital Gandhinagar. The local language is Gujarati.

== History ==
The village is said to have been re-peopled by Kardia Hamir of Sutrapada in 1839 and the population consists principally of Kardia Rajputs of the Barad, Mori, Jhankat, and Gohil tribes. But it was founded early in the fifteenth century by Raja or Garasia Bhuvad. Thus the tank is called the Bhuvad Talav; and the writer gathers from a Sanskrit inscription that the tank was excavated by Bai Vagti, daughter of Bai Magti, wife of Raj Bharam of Barad race for the spiritual benefit of Shri Bhuvad, so probably Vagti was the widow of Bhuvad who was doubtless a Garasia of some adjacent village. The inscription mentions that it was inscribed in 1401 (Samvat 1457) in the victorious reign of Raj Shri Shivgan. This Shivgan was probably a Vaja ruler of Somnath. His name occurs also in the inscription at Phulka near Una, the date of which is 1389 (Samvat 1445) so that the two inscriptions clearly refer to the same Shivgan. In the village is a grove of Ravan Tad trees or the branched variety of the palm trees.

== Demographics ==
The population according to the census of 1872 was 275 souls, but this number dwindled to 268 in 1881 consequent on the famine of 1878–79.

Nearby villages are Pedhavada, Pransli, Fachariya, Arnej, and Solaj.

There are temples of Bhudvagham, Amrutalayam, Sukhnath Mahadev, Ram and Hanuman in Bhuva Timbi.
