= Sanjay Koradia =

Indian politician

Sanjay Koradia (born 1972) is an Indian politician from Gujarat. He is a member of the Gujarat Legislative Assembly from Junagadh Assembly constituency in Junagadh district. He won the 2022 Gujarat Legislative Assembly election representing the Bharatiya Janata Party.

== Early life and education ==
Koradia is from Junagadh, Gujarat. He is the son of Kushnadas Vallabhdas Koradia. He studied Class 12 at Javahar Vinay Mandir, Shahpur (Sourath), and passed the HSC examinations in 1991 and later discontinued his studies. He is into business and runs food industries and his wife is also a business partner.

== Career ==
Koradia won from Junagadh Assembly constituency representing the Bharatiya Janata Party in the 2022 Gujarat Legislative Assembly election. He polled 86,616 votes and defeated his nearest rival and sitting MLA, Bhikhabhai Joshi of the Indian National Congress, by a margin of 40,256 votes.
