= Directorate of Groundnut Research =

Research centre in India

ICAR-Directorate of Groundnut Research
- भाकृअनुप-मूँगफली अनुसंधान निदेशालय
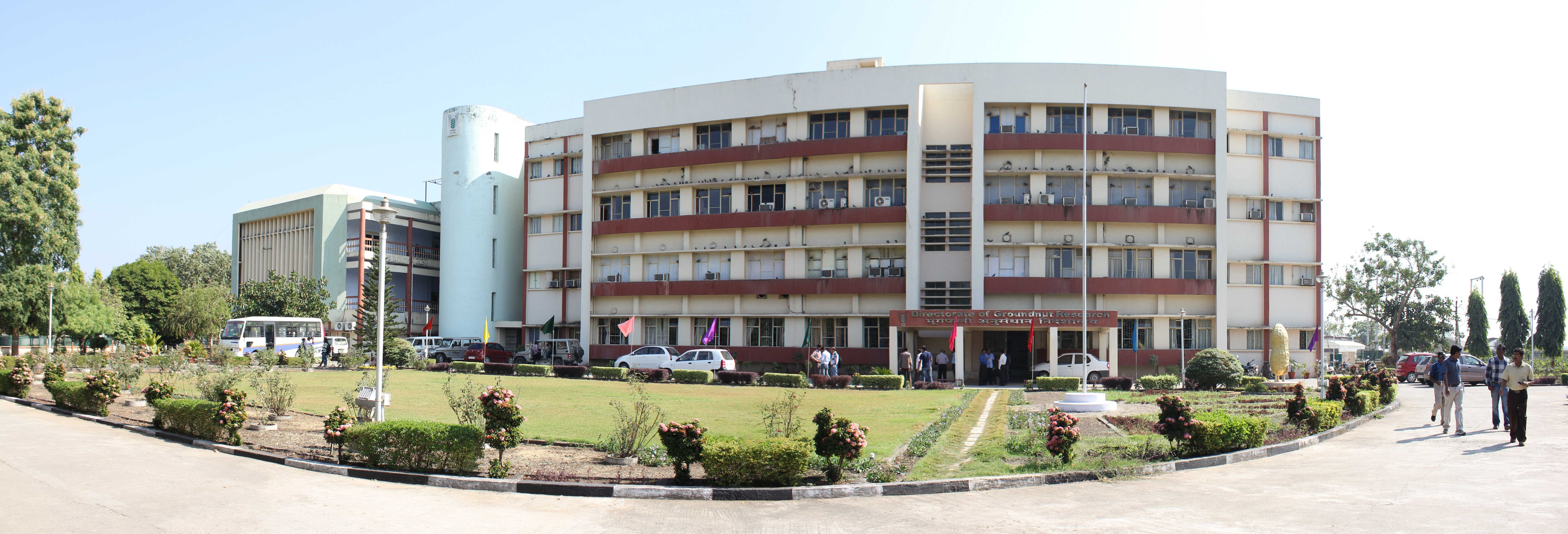
- Former names: National Research Centre for Groundnut
- Motto in English: "Agrisearch with a human touch"
- Type: Public
- Established: 1 Oct, 1979
- Affiliations: Indian Council of Agricultural Research
- Director: Dr. S.K. Bera
- Administrative staff: 114
- Location: Junagadh, Gujarat, India; 21.4843°N 70.4405°E
- Website: www.dgr.org.in

ICAR - Directorate of Groundnut Research (ICAR-DGR) formerly known as National Research Centre for Groundnut is a premier national level institute set up by the Indian Council of Agricultural Research, Ministry of Agriculture of India to cater to the needs of agricultural science research in the field of groundnut (peanut) crop in India. ICAR-DGR was established in 1979 ( at Junagadh by the Founder Director Dr. Durga Prasad Misra), Gujarat to give a fillip to research for enhancing productivity of groundnut in keeping with its importance among the oilseed crops of India. The research centre came into being as the first crop commodity research unit under the category of NRC's (National Research Centres) of the Indian Council of Agricultural Research, as an autonomous body set up as a registered society. The National Research Centre on Groundnut (NRCG) was elevated to the level of a Directorate in the year 2009 and rechristened as the Directorate of Groundnut Research.

== History ==
ICAR-DGR, the first crop based national research center in India under the ICAR, was established on 1 October 1979 at Junagadh on a leased land from Gujarat Agricultural University spread out over a land of about 18 ha. Later, the base of DGR was moved to 4 km away from the original site with the acquisition of additional 100 ha land from Junagadh Agricultural University, on 1 Oct 1991.

== Mandate ==
The institute is mandated to :

1. Basic, strategic and adaptive research on groundnut to improve productivity and quality
2. Provide access to information, knowledge and genetic material to develop suitable varieties and technologies
3. Coordination of applied research to develop location specific varieties and technologies
4. Dissemination of technology and capacity building.

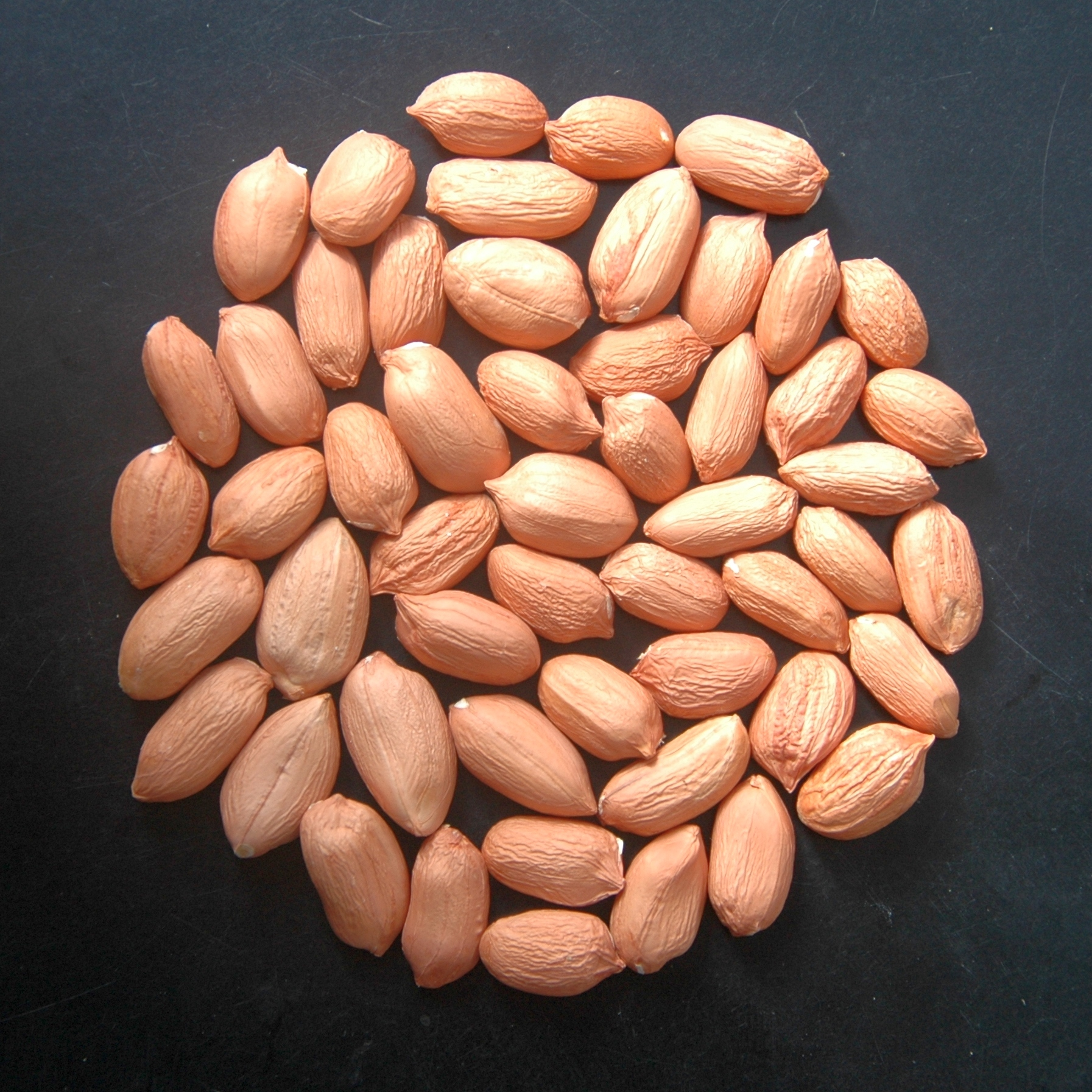
Groundnut kernel

== Mission ==
Conduct research for improving the crop production technologies to eventually enhance groundnut productivity of India to 3000 kg/ha for rainfed and to 4000 kg/ha for irrigated crops through a blend of basic and strategic multidisciplinary research by developing remunerative, globally competitive and sustainable crop production and protection technologies for groundnut based cropping systems in different agro-ecological regions of India through a blend of basic and strategic multidisciplinary research.

== Divisions ==
The activities of the Institute is primarily handled by five divisions, each entrusted with specific tasks.

=== Crop Production ===
Crop Production division is involved in the research on improvement of production technologies of groundnut for which it focusses on the Development of sustainable packages of practices for groundnut based cropping system and management of existing and emerging problems of soil and water salinity for groundnut production.

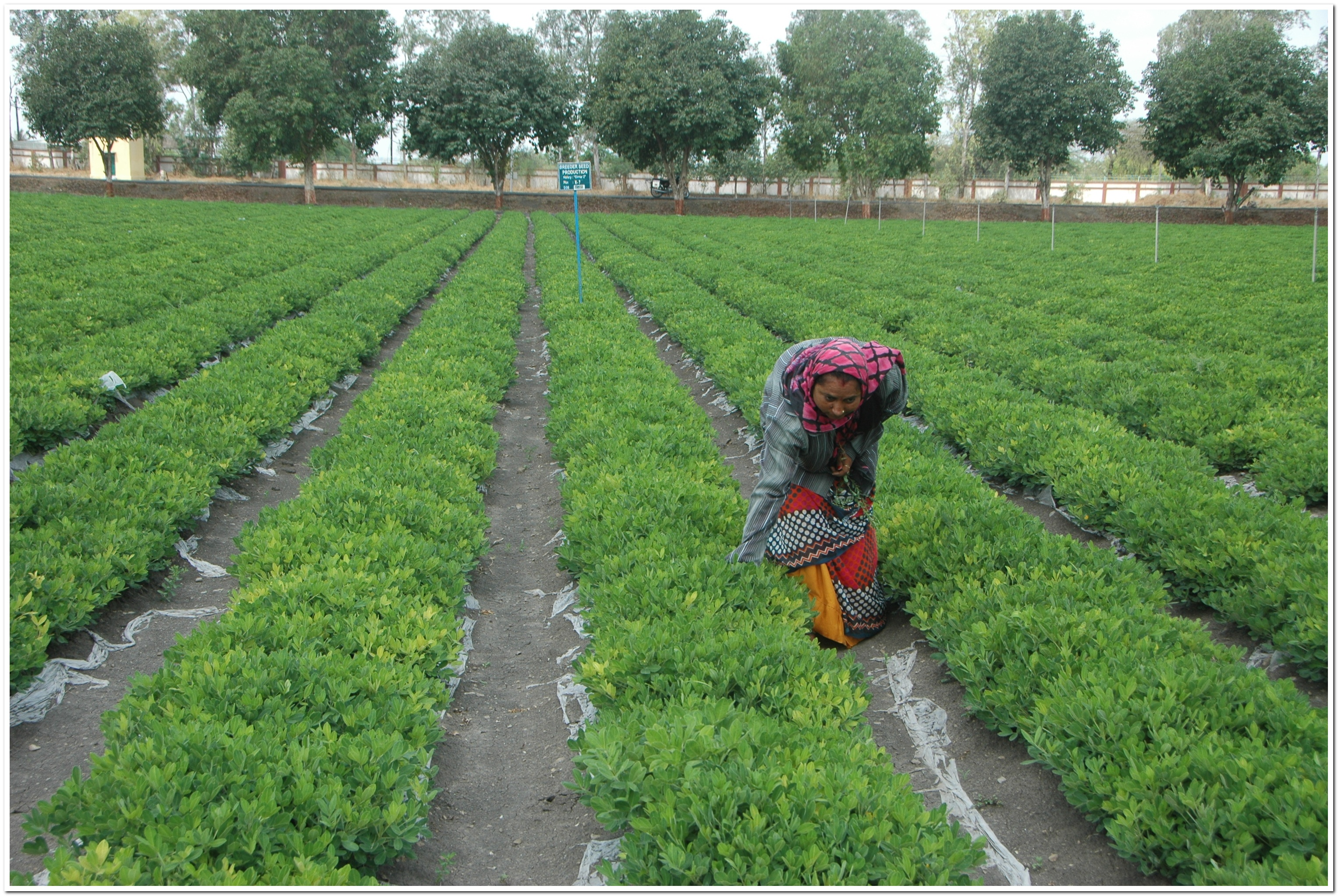
Groundnut cultivation under polythene mulch

=== Crop Protection ===
Crop Protection division is engaged in the research of Integrated pest management in groundnut based production systems and prevention and management of mycotoxin contamination in groundnut.

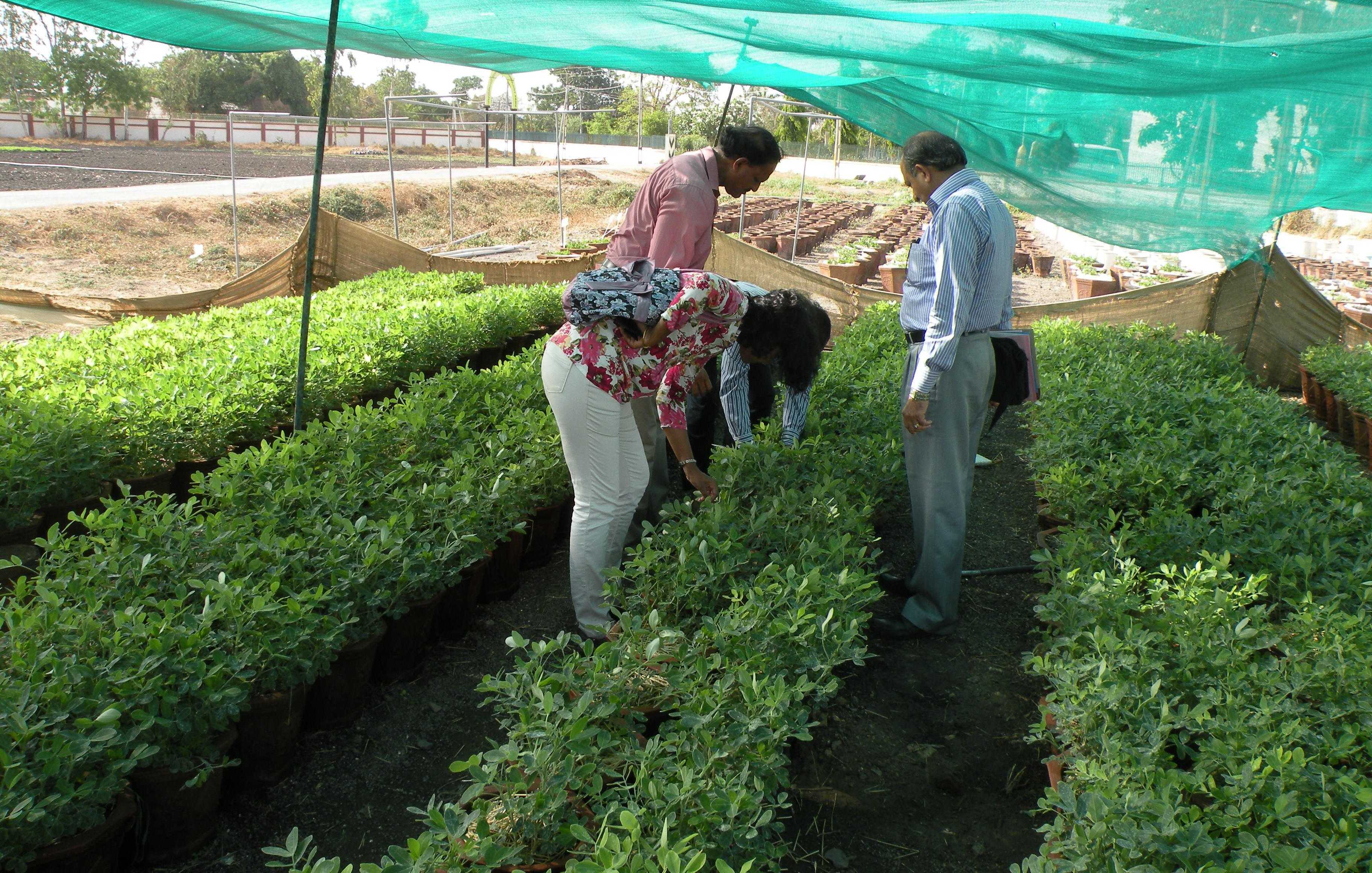
Groundnut cultivation under shade net

=== Crop Improvement ===
Crop Protection division is major unit at the center engaged in the genetics, plant breeding and biotechnological interventions for improvement of the groundnut crop. Major programmes includes:

1. Breeding for tolerance of biotic and abiotic stresses in groundnut
2. Management of germplasm of cultivated groundnut and its wild relatives
3. Biotechnological approaches to the characterization and genetic enhancement of groundnut
4. Breeding for large -seeded and confectionery type groundnut
5. Utilization of wild Arachis gene pool for improvement of groundnut
6. Breeding for improved forage and fodder quality traits in groundnut

It maintains a groundnut Gene bank and a biotechnology laboratory specifically for this purpose. Present scientists in this division: Dr. SK Bera, Dr. Chandramohan Sangh, Dr. Kriti Rani, Dr. Praveen Kona, Dr. Papa Rao Vaikuntapu

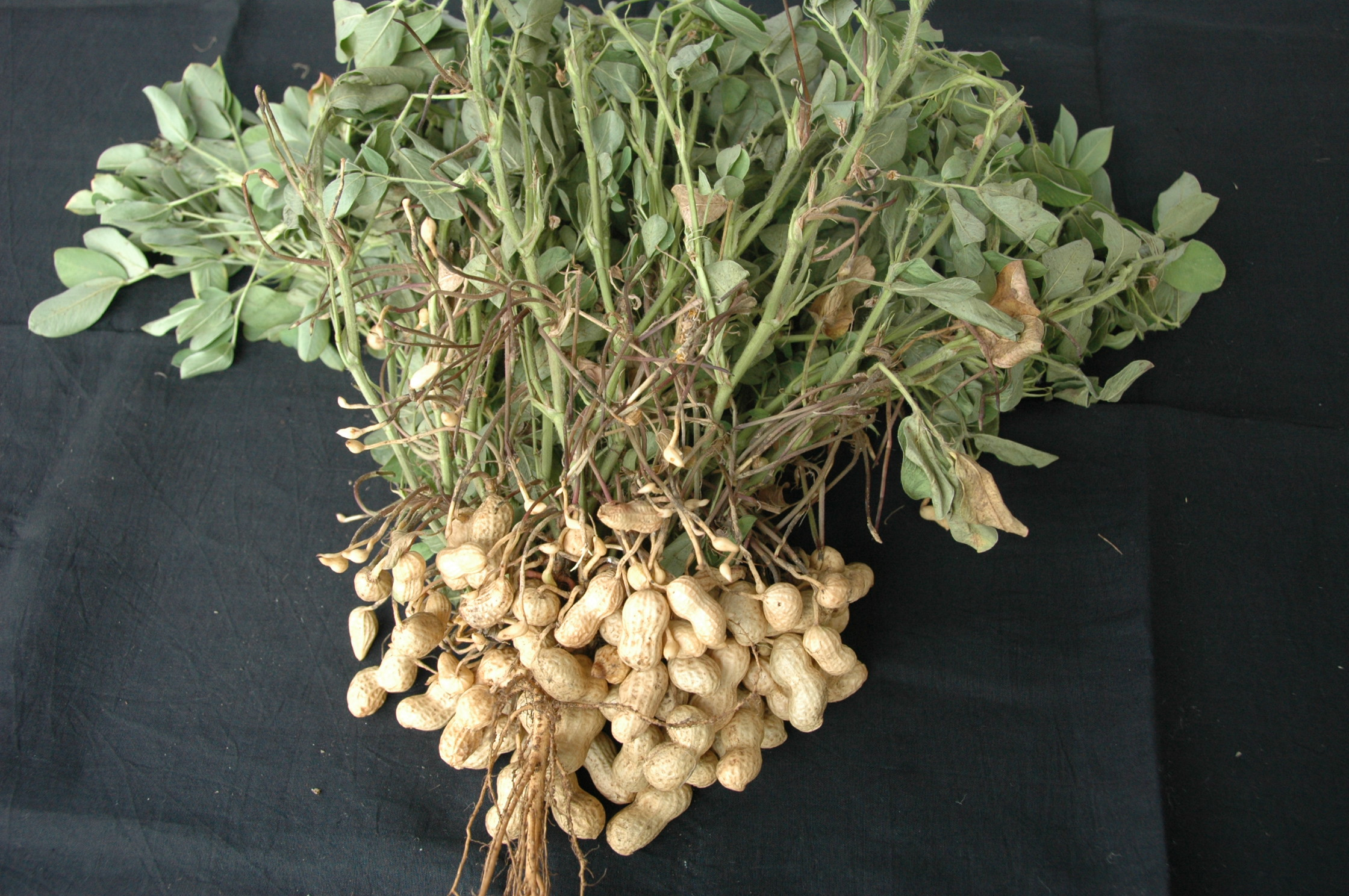
Girnar 2 variety

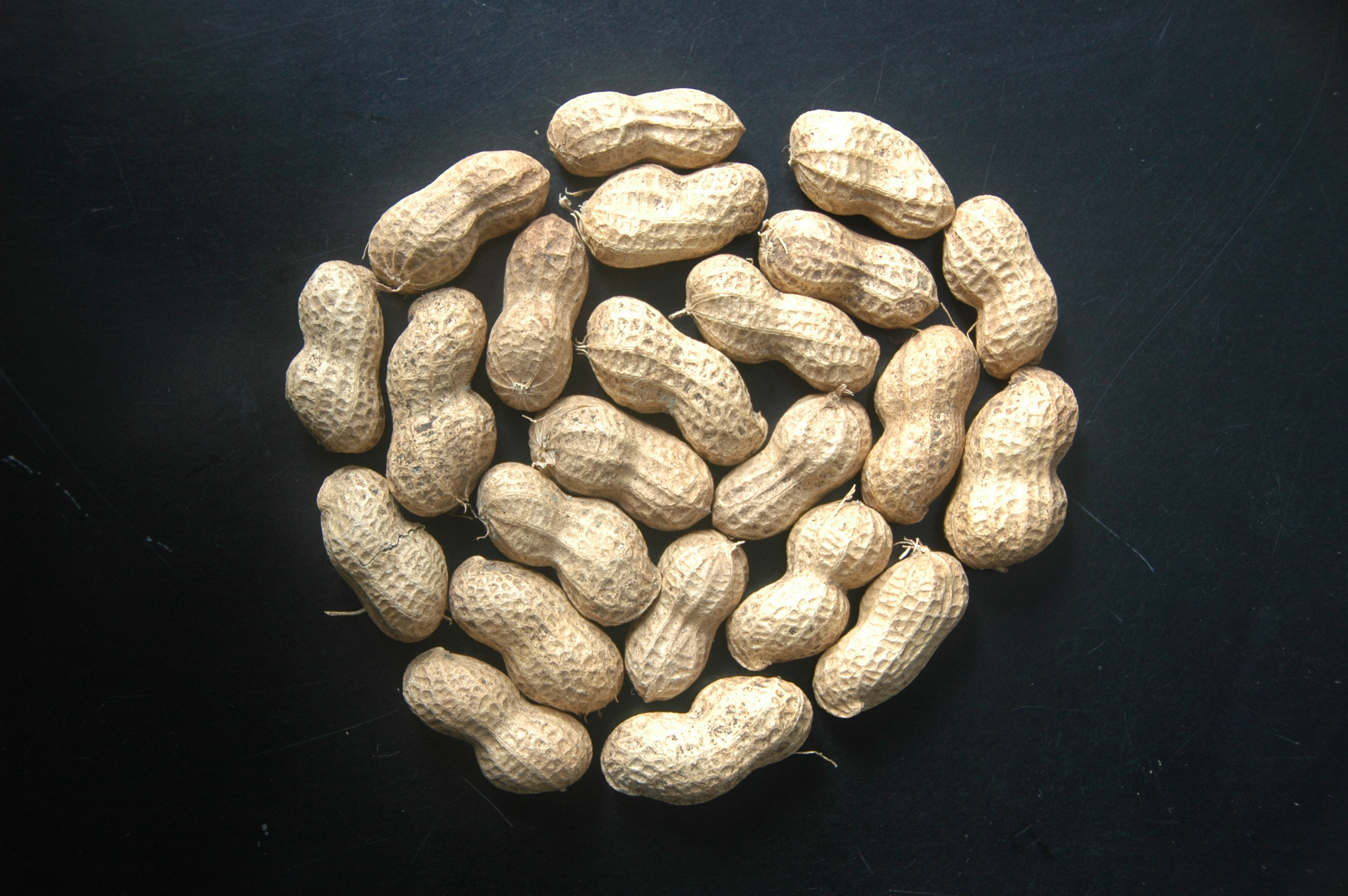
Pods of Girnar 2 variety

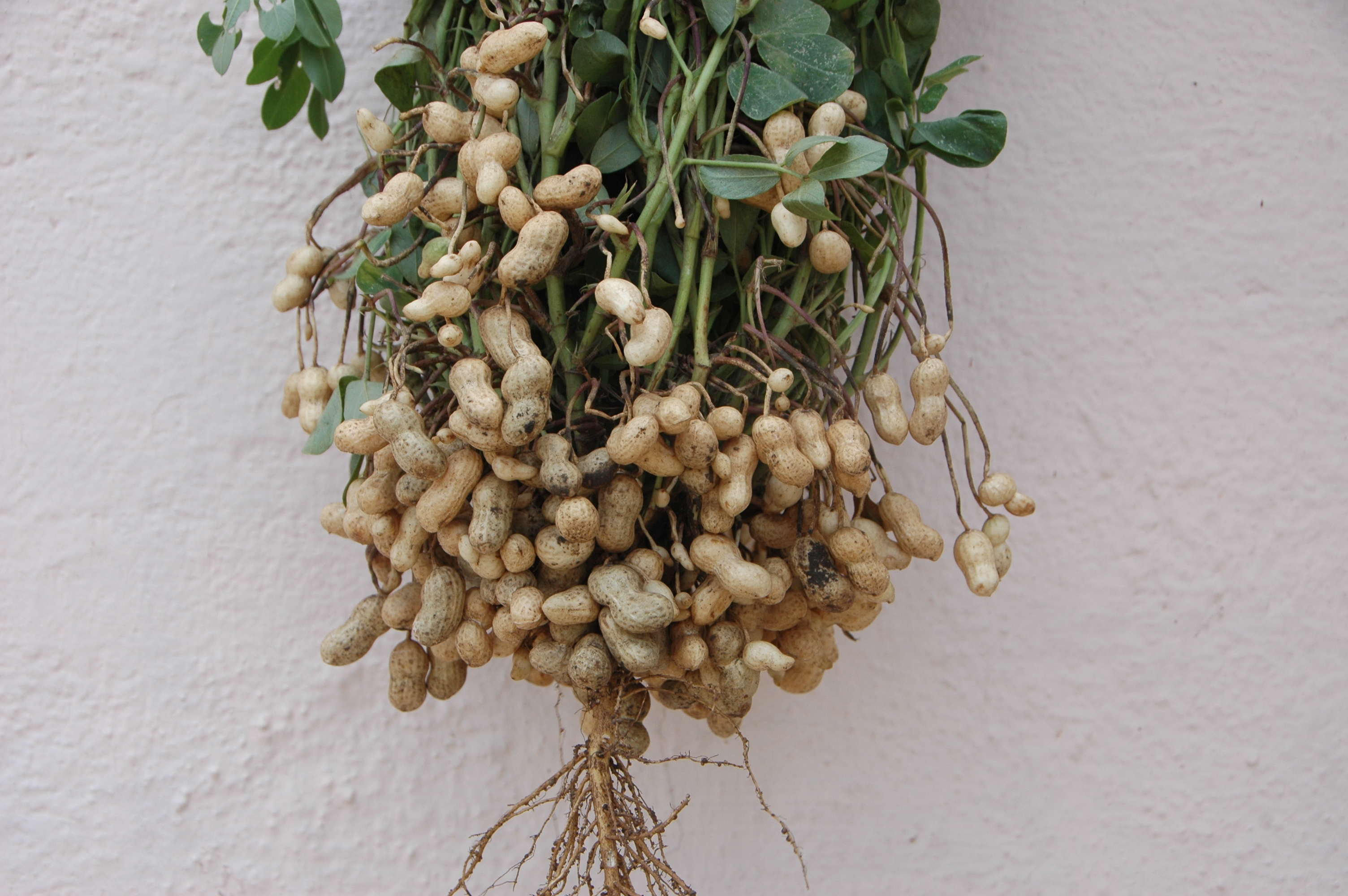
GIRNAR 3 variety

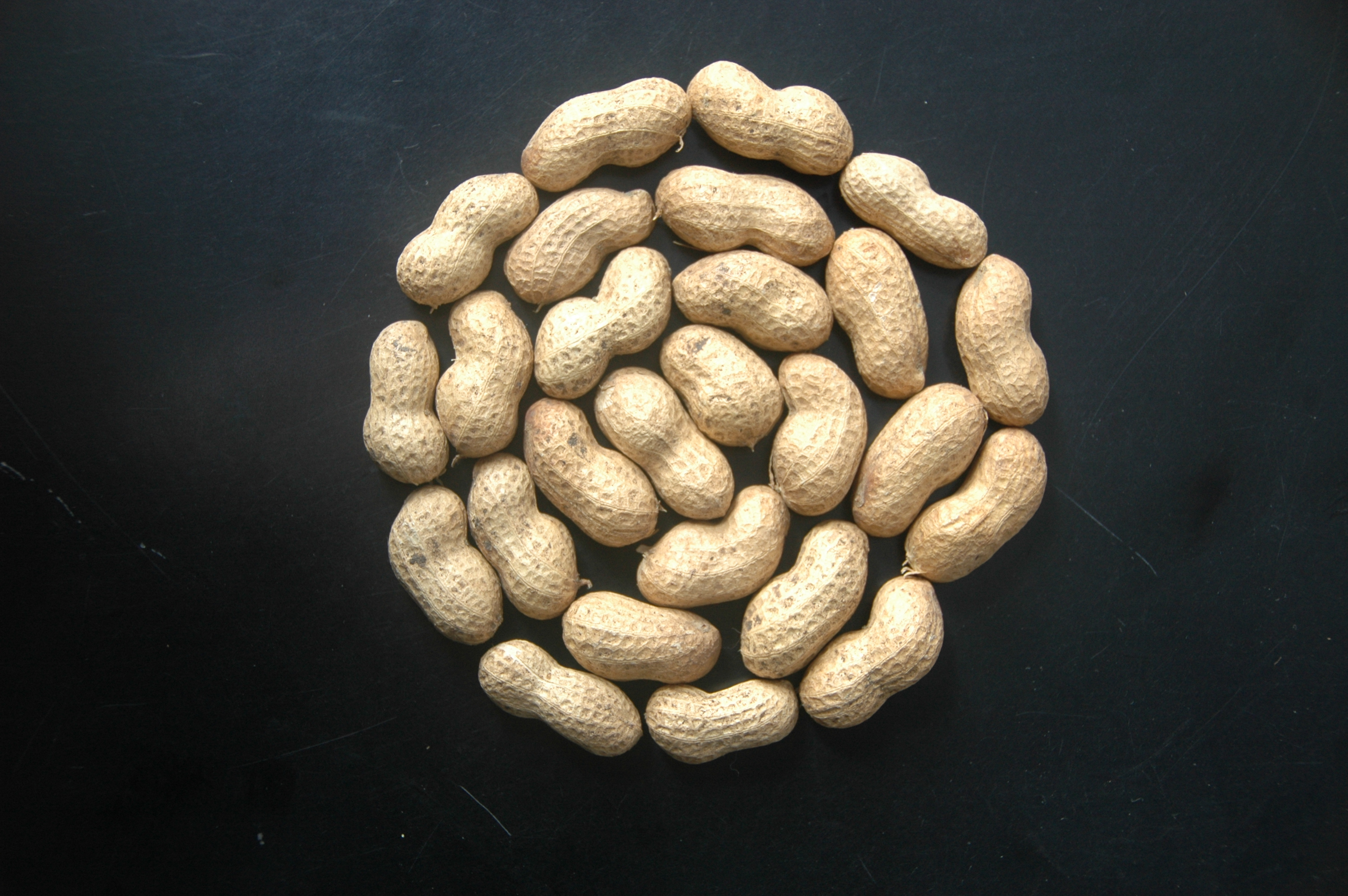
Pods of Girnar 3 variety

=== Basic Sciences ===
The Basic Sciences Unit is engaged in the following activities:

1. Physiological studies on environmental stresses in groundnut
2. Management of mineral nutrition and associated stresses in groundnut
3. Microorganisms in relation to soil health and plant nutrition in groundnut
4. Assessment and enhancement of quality in groundnut and its value added products
5. Biotransformation of groundnut by-products into useful products

=== Social Sciences ===
The Basic Sciences Unit is the youngest unit of the centre. It caters to:

1. Economics of groundnut cultivation in major growing areas
2. Impact assessment of improved groundnut production technologies: Sustainable livelihood analysis
3. Development of statistical models for evaluation of field trials on groundnut crop and determination of scenarios in area and production

== AICRP-Groundnut ==
The ICAR had set up an All India Coordinated research Project on Oilseeds (AICORPO) in the year 1967 for coordinating research on various oil seed crops of India. Subsequently the groundnut crop was delineated from the AICORPO set up and was given an independent status as All India Coordinated Research Project on Groundnut (AICRP-G) during 1992 (beginning of VIII-Plan).

Besides in-house research projects, an umbrella research project ‘All India Coordinated Research Project on Groundnut’ or AICRPG in short, also operates from the NRCG (DGR), Junagadh. This project is funded by the funds which are allotted separately by the ICAR under the head ‘Plan’. The AICRPG was originally located at Akola, from where it was shifted to NRCG (DGR), Junagadh in the year 1987. Under AICRPG, the country is divided into five zones keeping mainly the agroclimate of the region in view. The coordinated inter-disciplinary location specific research is being conducted in collaboration with theSAU’s, several ICAR Institutes and KVK’s. The Director with the help of principal investigators/scientists of the NRCG (DGR) coordinates the research programmes developed during the technical meetings of the AICRPG at the national level. At present there are five main and seventeen supporting centres under AICRPG.

=== Mandate ===
1. Multidisciplinary research on Crop Improvement, Crop Production and Crop Protection aspects of groundnut are carried out in all the regular centres as well as selected KVKs / voluntary centres, across the country, in the areas of :
2. Development of high yielding varieties possessing resistance/field tolerance to drought, diseases and pests; high temperature, salinity and acid soils.
3. Development of groundnut based cropping system and economically viable production and protection technologies for exploiting the potential yield of the crop variety and thereby reducing gaps between realizable and potential.
4. Demonstration of proven production and processing technologies on quality aspects through On-Farm Demonstrations for the benefit of farmers in target areas.
5. Identification of stable sources of resistance to biotic and abiotic stresses at hot spots and their utilization in varietal improvement programme through national and international collaboration.
6. Production of Nucleus and Breeder seed of nationally important varieties.

== Gallery ==
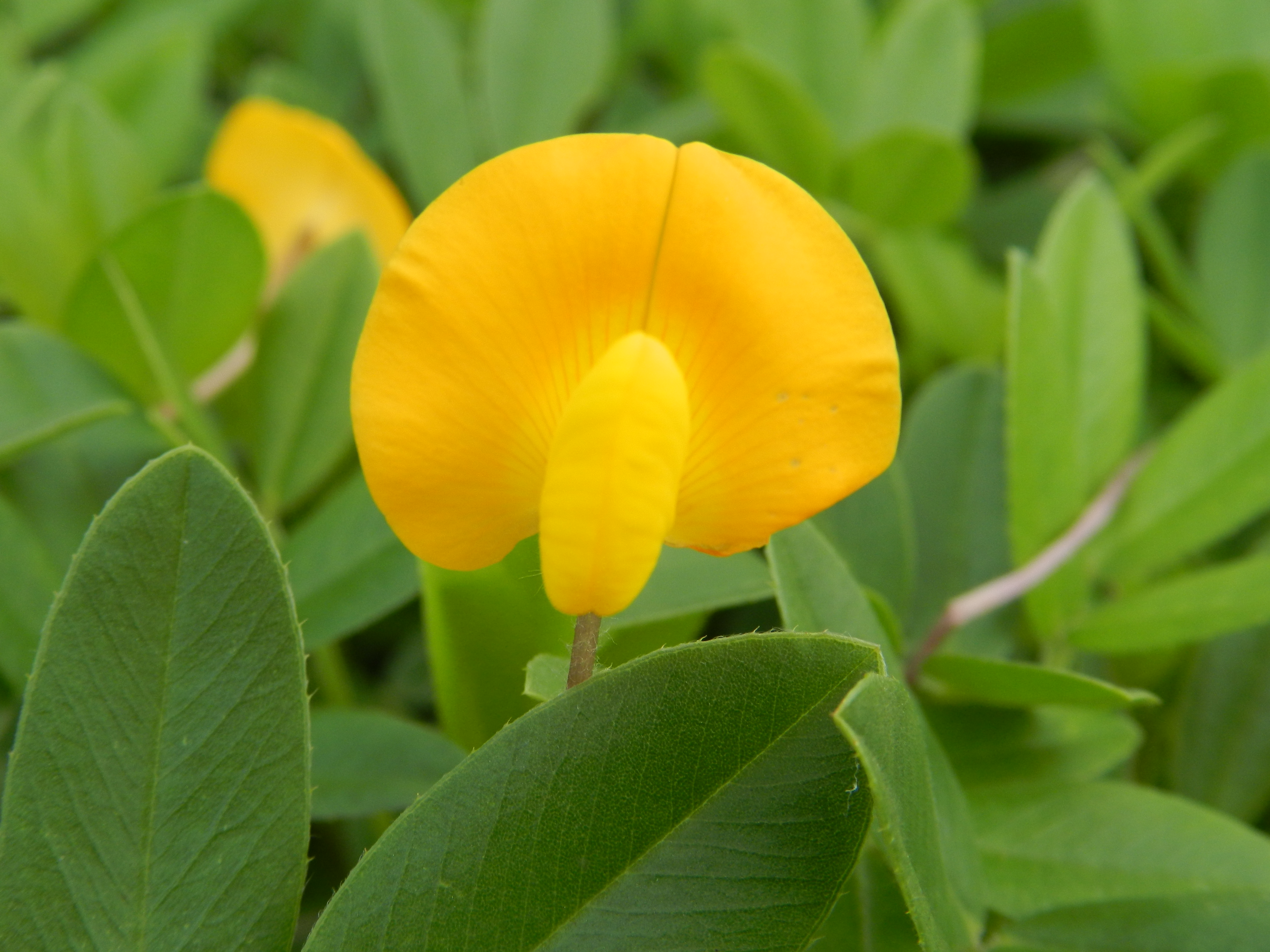
Groundnut Flower

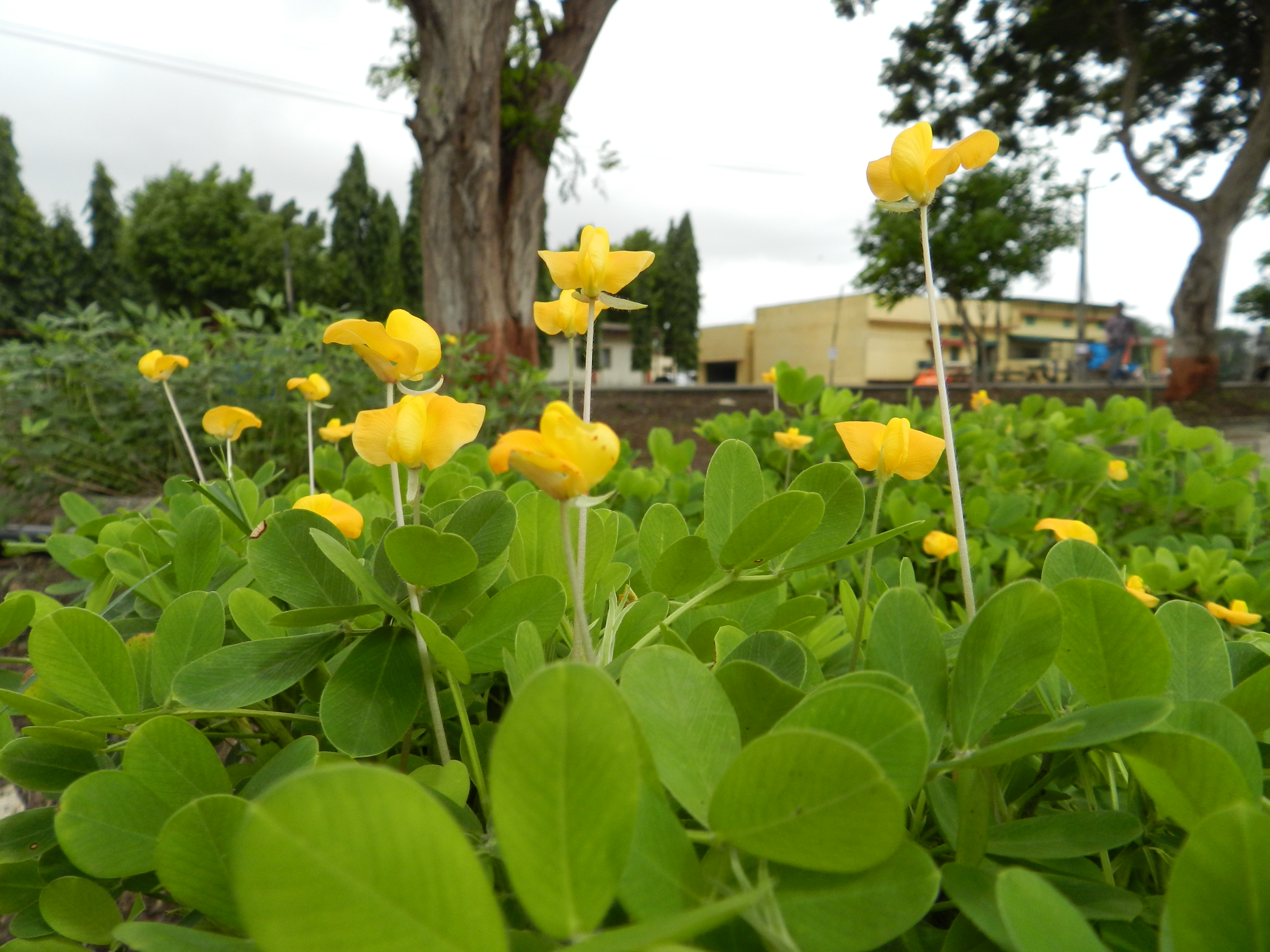
Groundnut Flower bloom

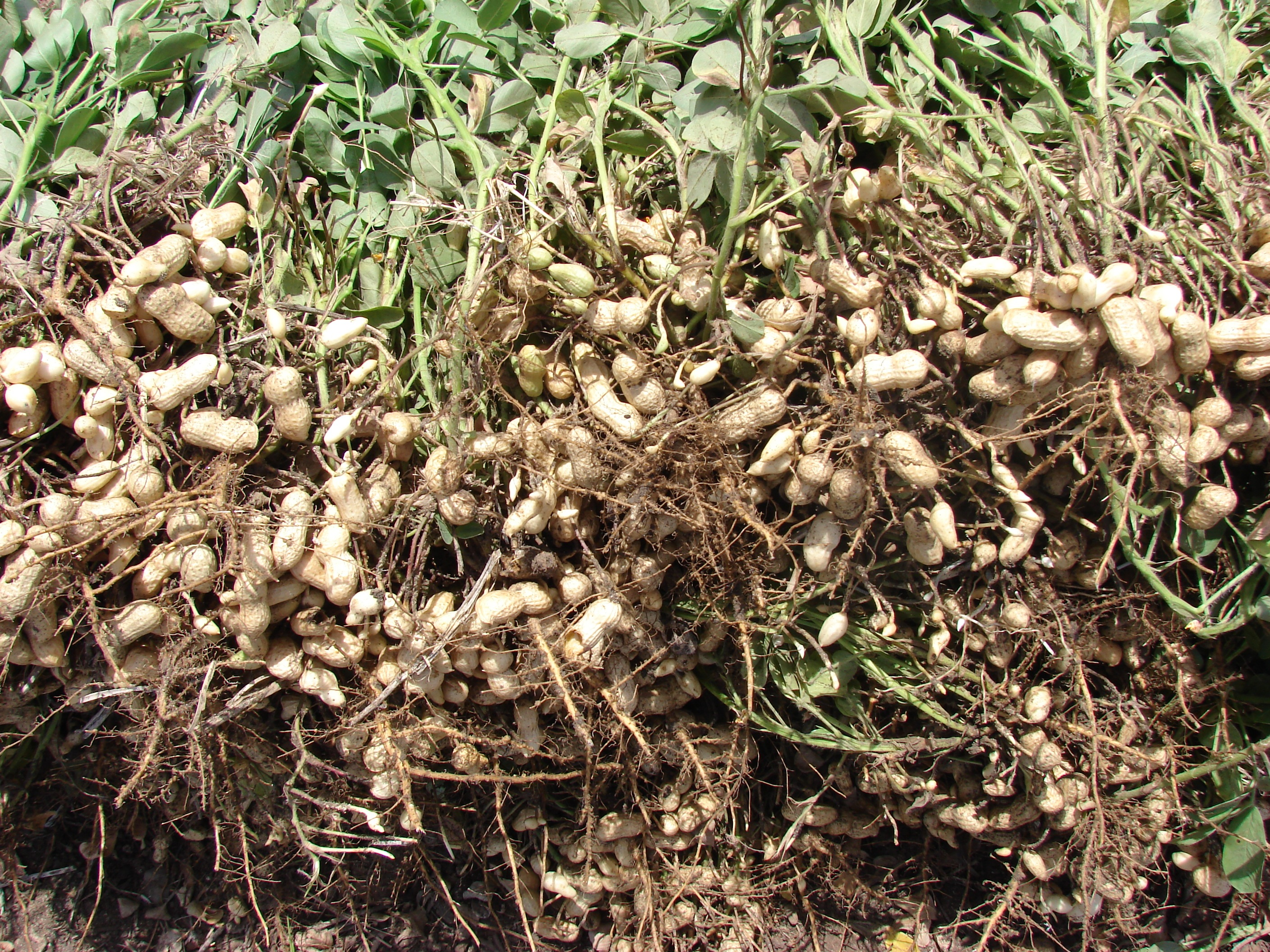
Groundnut Harvest

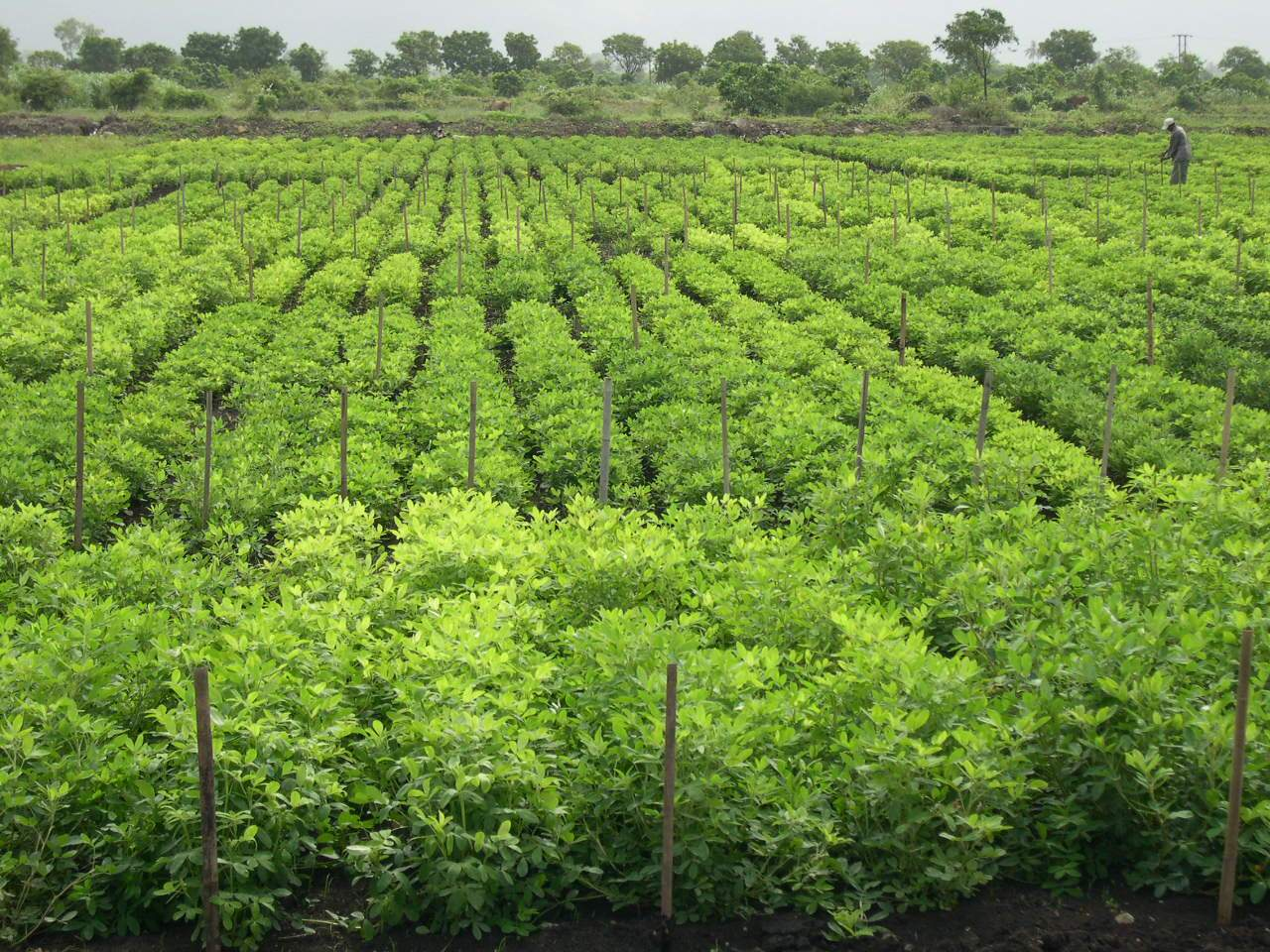
Multiplication of Released Groundnut Varieties at DGR

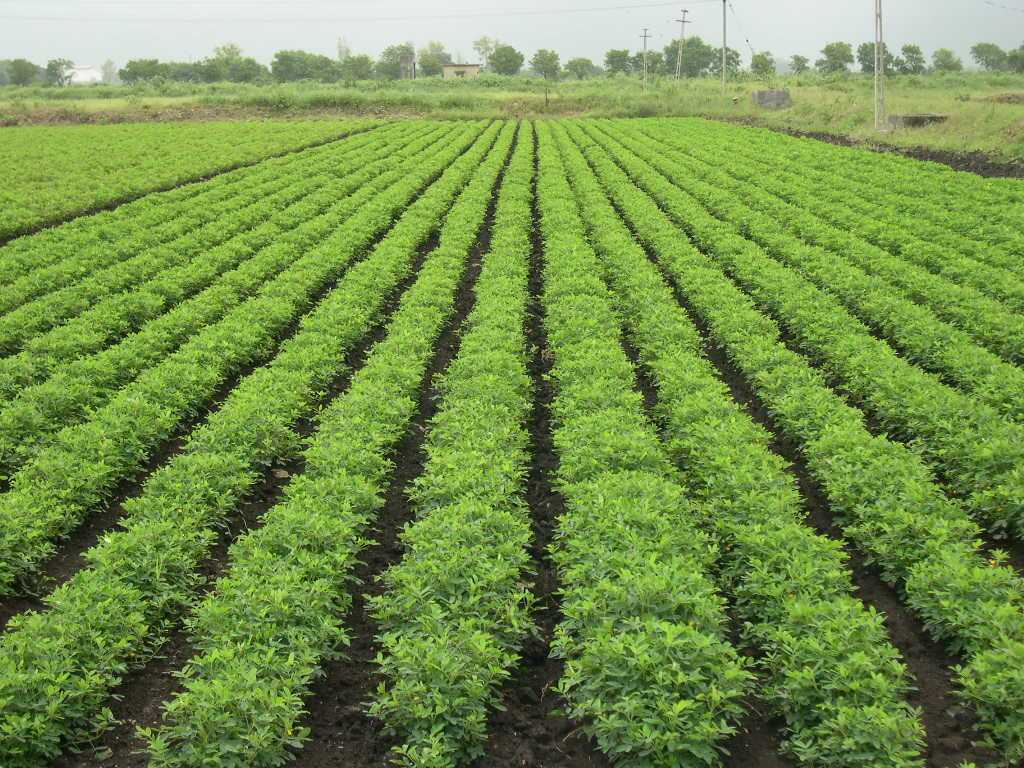
Field view at DGR

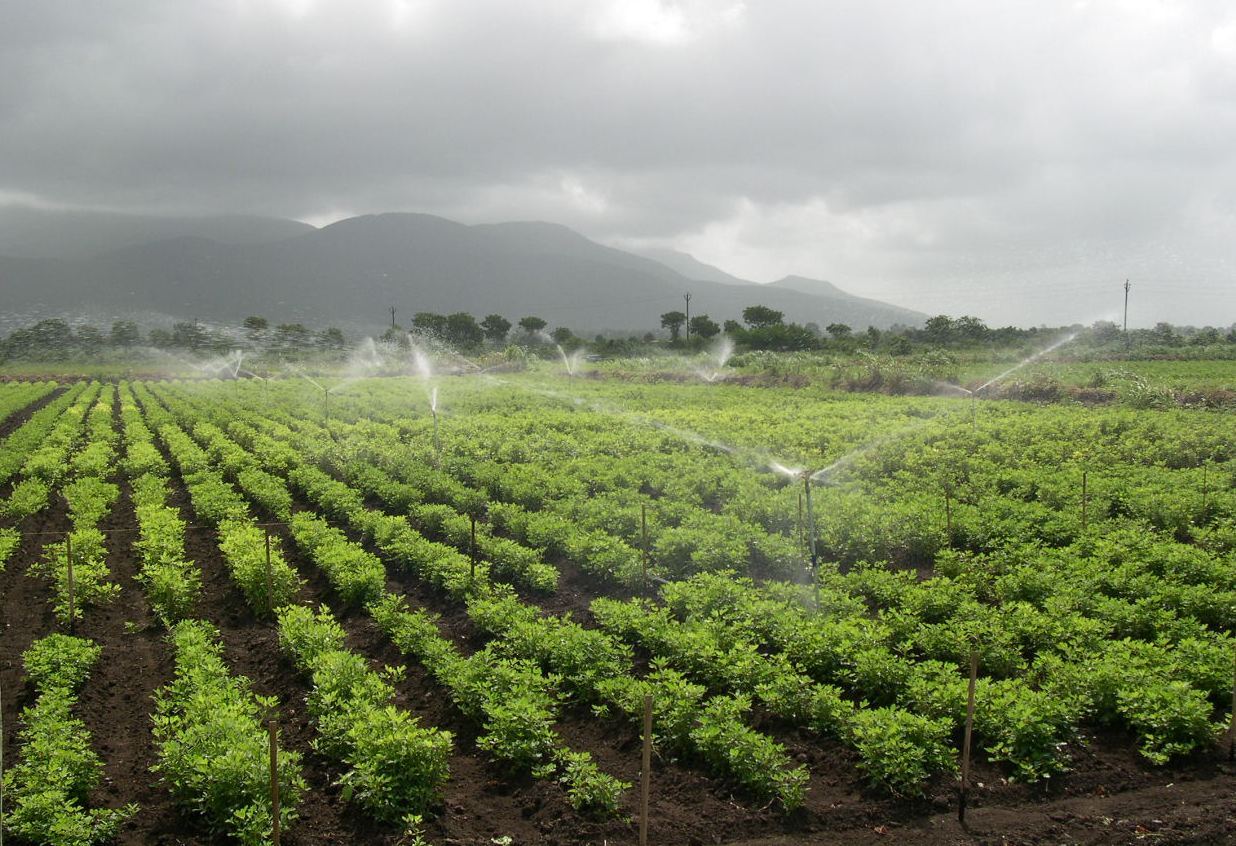
Irrigation through sprinkler

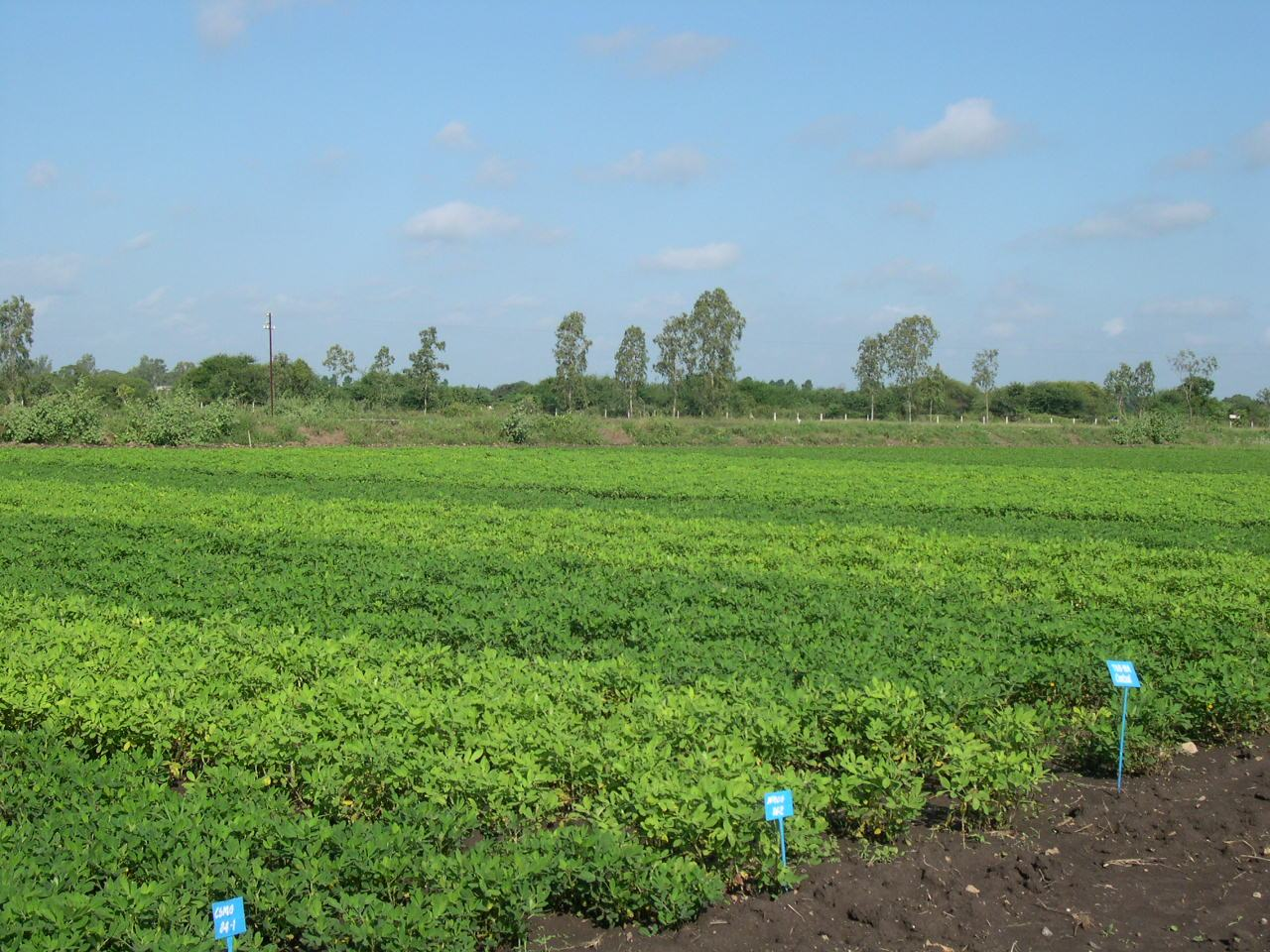
Multiplication of groundnut genotypes at DGR

== See also ==
- Agroecological restoration
- Agroecosystem
- Agroecosystem analysis
- Ecology
- Organic agriculture
