= Mahendra Mashru =

Indian politician

Member of the Gujarat Legislative Assembly
- In office 1990–2017
- Constituency: Junagadh

Personal details
- Party: Bharatiya Janata Party

Mahendra Mashru is an Indian politician from Gujarat. He was a Member of Legislative assembly from Junagadh constituency from 1990 as an independent. He later joined Bharatiya Janata Party and won from the same seat in 1998, 2002, 2007 and 2012.

He lost in 2017 Gujarat Legislative Assembly election from Junagadh against Indian National Congress candidate Bhikhabhai Joshi.

He lives simple life. He had not accepted a salary as a member of legislative assembly and used public transport to attend sessions of the legislative assembly.
