= Harshad Patel (politician) =

Indian politician (born 1971)

Harshad Ranchhodbhai Patel (born 1971) is an Indian politician from Gujarat. He is a member of the Gujarat Legislative Assembly from Sabarmati Assembly constituency in Ahmedabad district. He won the 2022 Gujarat Legislative Assembly election representing the Bharatiya Janata Party.

== Early life and education ==
Patel is from Sabarmati, Ahmedabad district, Gujarat. He is the son of Ranchhodbhai Shivramdas Patel. He completed his PhD in 2017 at Gujarat University, Ahmedabad. Earlier, he did his MEd in 1992 at Prakash College, Memnagar, Ahmedabad, which is affiliated with Gujarat University, Ahmedabad. He also did his MCom at C.U. Shah City Arts and Commerce College, Lal Darwaja, Ahmedabd, which is also affiliated with Gujarat University, Ahmedabad. He was a retired principal at Shree RR Dwivedi High School, Vejalpur, Ahmedabad.

== Career ==
Patel won from Sabarmati Assembly constituency representing the Bharatiya Janata Party in the 2022 Gujarat Legislative Assembly election. He polled 120,202 votes and defeated his nearest rival, Dineshsinh Mahida of the Indian National Congress, by a margin of 98,684 votes.

He was the election agent for home minister Amit Shah from 1998.
