= Bhesan village, Junagadh =

Bhesan
- Bhesan, Gujarat, India
- Location in Junagadh, Gujarat, India Bhesan (India)
- Coordinates: 21.5548528°N 70.7034651°E
- Country: India
- State: Gujarat
- District: Junagadh

Area
  - Total: 30 km^{2} (12 sq mi)

Population (2022)
  - Total: 25,000
  - Density: 830/km^{2} (2,200/sq mi)

Languages
  - Official: Gujarati, Hindi, English
- Time zone: UTC+5:30 (IST)
- 02873: 362020
- Vehicle registration: GJ 11

Bhesan is a Town in Junagadh district, Gujarat, India.
