= Talala Assembly constituency =

Constituency of the Gujarat legislative assembly

Coordinates: 21.06°N 70.53°E

Talala
- Constituency No. 91 for the Gujarat Legislative Assembly

Constituency details
- Country: India
- Region: Western India
- State: Gujarat
- District: Gir Somnath
- Lok Sabha constituency: Junagadh
- Established: 1990
- Total electors: 235,040
- Reservation: None

Member of Legislative Assembly
- 15th Gujarat Legislative Assembly
- Incumbent Bhagabhai Dhanabhai Barad
- Party: Bharatiya Janata Party
- Elected year: 2022

Talala is one of the 182 Legislative Assembly constituencies of Gujarat state in India. It is part of Gir Somnath district.

== List of segments ==
This assembly seat represents the following segments,

1. Mandorana
2. Talala Taluka
3. Sutrapada Taluka
4. Mendarda Taluka (Part) Village – Lakadveri nes.

== Members of Legislative Assembly ==
^ (by poll)

Year	Member	Party
1975	Kanjibhai Kasharabhai Mori	Indian National Congress
1980	Kalabhai Ranmalbhai Zala	Indian National Congress (I)
1985	Arsibhai Punja Zala	Janata Party
1990	Jethabhai Ranabhai Jora	Indian National Congress
1995	Ahir Jasabhai D. Barad	Bharatiya Janta Party
1998	Ahir Jasabhai D. Barad	Indian National Congress
2002	Govindbhai Parmar	Bharatiya Janta Party
2007	Ahir Bhagabhai D. Barad	Indian National Congress
2012	Ahir Jasabhai D. Barad	Indian National Congress
2016^	Govindbhai Parmar	Bharatiya Janta Party
2017	Ahir Bhagabhai D. Barad	Indian National Congress
2022	Ahir Bhagabhai D. Barad	Bharatiya Janata Party

== Election results ==
=== 2022 ===
Gujarat Assembly election, 2022: Talala Assembly constituency
Party	Candidate	Votes	%	±%
BJP	Bhagabhai Dhanabhai Barad	64,788	43.17	
AAP	Solanki Devendrabhai Kanjibhai	44,733	29.81	
INC	Dodiya Mansingbhai Jesingbhai	34,413	22.93	
NOTA	None of the above	1,486	0.99	
Majority			13.99	
Turnout				
Registered electors		231,873		
BJP gain from INC		Swing		

=== 2017 ===
Gujarat Legislative Assembly Election, 2017: Talala
Party	Candidate	Votes	%	±%
INC	Bhagabhai Dhanabhai Barad			
NOTA	None of the Above			
Majority				
Turnout				

=== 2016 ===
By-election, 2016: Talala
Party	Candidate	Votes	%	±%
BJP	Govindbhai Parmar	63,899	49.52	
INC	Bhagvanbhai Barad	61,458	47.63	
Independent	Bagasbhai Chotiyara	706	0.544	
Independent	Hasambhai Mugasara	694	0.53	
Independent	Ramjibhai Parmar	613	0.47	
Independent	Hanifaben Majgul	252	0.19	
NOTA	None of the above	1,390	1.07	
Majority		2,441	1.89	
Turnout		1,29,012		
BJP gain from INC		Swing		

=== 2012 ===
Gujarat Assembly Election, 2012
Party	Candidate	Votes	%	±%
INC	Jasubhai Barad	62,722	44.43	
BJP	Govind Parmar	61,244	43.38	
Majority		1,478	1.05	
Turnout		141,184	77.32	
INC hold		Swing		

== See also ==
- List of constituencies of Gujarat Legislative Assembly
- Gujarat Legislative Assembly
