= Supasi =

- village
- Location in Gujarat, India Supasi (India)
- Coordinates: 20.9839°N 70.3175°E
- Country: India
- State: Gujarat
- District: Gir Somnath
- Talukas: Veraval

Government
  - Type: Democratic
  - Body: Sarpanch Village Panchayat
- Elevation: 57 m (187 ft)

Population
  - Total: 5,172

Languages
  - Official: Gujarati, Hindi
- Time zone: UTC+5:30 (IST)
- PIN: 362255
- Vehicle registration: GJ
- Website: gujaratindia.com

Supasi is a village in Veraval taluka of Gir Somnath District, Gujarat, India.
