= Narhari Amin =

Indian politician (born 1955)

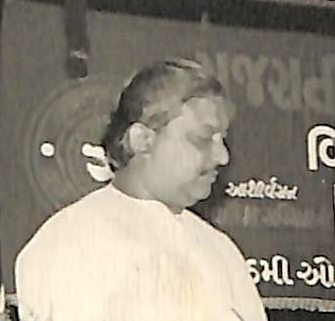
- Amin at Gujarati Vishwakosh Trust in 1994

Member of Parliament, Rajya Sabha
- In office 22 July 2020 – 21 July 2026
- Preceded by: Lal Sinh Vadodia
- Succeeded by: Mansingh Parmar
- Constituency: Gujarat

Deputy Chief Minister of Gujarat
- In office 17 February 1994 – 14 March 1995
- Chief Minister: Chhabildas Mehta

Member of Gujarat Legislative Assembly
- In office 2001–2002
- Preceded by: Yatinbhai Oza
- Succeeded by: Jitendrabhai Patel
- Constituency: Sabarmati
- In office 1990–1995
- Preceded by: Bharat Ghadavi
- Succeeded by: Yatinbhai Oza
- Constituency: Sabarmati

Personal details
- Born: 5 June 1955 (age 71) Ahmedabad, Bombay State, India
- Party: Bharatiya Janata Party (2012–present)
- Other political affiliations: Janata Dal (until 1999), Indian National Congress (1999–2012)

Narhari Amin (born 5 June 1955) is a politician from Gujarat state of India. He is a member of the Indian Parliament (MP) affiliated with the Bharatiya Janta Party. Formerly he was a Deputy Chief Minister of Gujarat affiliated to the Indian National Congress in 1994. He left the Indian National Congress on 5 December 2012 after he was denied a ticket to contest the December 2012 state legislative assembly election. On 6 December 2012, he joined the Bharatiya Janata Party.

== Early life ==
Amin gained early experience in the Navnirman Andolan of 1974. The movement was so successful that Jayprakash Narayan was said to have been inspired by its force and success. Amin was one of the most identifiable faces of that movement and its success could be gauged from its ability to topple the government of the then Gujarat CM Chimanbhai Patel.

== Political career ==
Amin had won the assembly election in 1990 from Sabarmati on Janata Dal ticket defeating Natver Patel of BJP by 9444 votes.

Subsequently, Amin lost two consecutive elections in 1995 and 1998 with over 21000 votes to Yatin Ojha of the BJP.

In a by-election in 2001, Amin had then defeated BJP's Babu Patel with a margin of over 18000 votes. The seat had fallen vacant after the sitting BJP MLA Yatinbhai Oza had joined Congress.

He again faced a defeat from BJP's Jitendra Patel in the 2002 election with a huge margin of 59190 votes.

His last electoral defeat came in 2007, when he lost to young Congress turncoat Devusinh Jesingbhai Chauhan who defeated him in Matar with 7799 votes.

On 5 December 2012, after he was denied a ticket to contest the December 2012 state legislative assembly election he left the Indian National Congress and joined the Bharatiya Janata Party.

On 29 October 2013, he was made the vice president of the Planning Commission of Gujarat. He has held the post of deputy chief minister of the Gujarat state in his tenure for the Indian National Congress. He has thus been a recipient of various portfolios. He was also president of Gujarat Cricket Association and former vice-president of Board of Control for Cricket in India. He is also the director of Hiramani School at Ahmedabad.

He was elected to Rajya Sabha in 2020 Indian Rajya Sabha elections. During the election the first two candidates of BJP and first candidate of INC got 36 votes each. Amin received 32 first preference votes compared to 30 received by the second candidate of INC. Amin won with 35.98 votes after the addition of second preference votes (the other candidate got 31.99).
