= Sabarmati Assembly constituency =

Legislative Assembly constituency in Gujarat State, India

Coordinates: 23.08°N 72.59°E

Sabarmati
- Constituency No. 55 for the Gujarat Legislative Assembly

Constituency details
- Country: India
- Region: Western India
- State: Gujarat
- District: Ahmedabad
- Lok Sabha constituency: Gandhinagar
- Established: 1962
- Total electors: 279,208
- Reservation: None

Member of Legislative Assembly
- 15th Gujarat Legislative Assembly
- Incumbent Harshad bhai Ranchhodbhai
- Party: Bharatiya Janata Party
- Elected year: 2022

Sabarmati is one of the 182 Legislative Assembly constituencies of Gujarat state in India. It is part of Ahmedabad district and is one of the seven assembly seats which make up the Gandhinagar Lok Sabha constituency.

== List of segments ==
This assembly seat represents the following segments,

1. Ahmedabad City Taluka (Part) Villages – Kali (M), Ranip (M), Chandlodiya (M).
2. Ahmedabad City Taluka (Part) – Ahmedabad Municipal Corporation (Part) Ward No. – 15.

== Members of Legislative Assembly ==
Election	Member	Party
1962	Shamalbhai Patel	Swatantra Party
1975	Babubhai Patel	Indian National Congress (O)
1980	Kokilaben Vyas	Indian National Congress (I)
1985	Bharat Ghadavi	Indian National Congress
1990	Narhari Amin	Janata Dal
1995	Yatinbhai Oza	Bharatiya Janata Party
1998	Yatinbhai Oza	Bharatiya Janata Party
2001^	Narhari Amin	Indian National Congress
2002	Jitendrabhai Patel	Bharatiya Janata Party
2007	Gita Patel	Bharatiya Janata Party
2012	Arvind Patel Dalal	Bharatiya Janata Party
2017	Arvind Patel Dalal	Bharatiya Janata Party
2022	Harshadbhai Ranchhodbhai Patel	Bharatiya Janata Party

^By Poll

== Election results ==
=== 2022 ===
Gujarat Assembly election, 2022: Sabarmati Assembly constituency
Party	Candidate	Votes	%	±%
BJP	Harshad bhai Ranchhodbhai	120202	76.75	
INC	Dineshsinh Ganpatsinh Mahida	21518	13.74	
AAP	Jasvant Thakor	10590	6.76	
NOTA	None of the above	2275	1.45	
Majority		98,684	63.01	
Turnout				
Registered electors		274,943		
BJP hold		Swing		

=== 2017 ===
Gujarat Legislative Assembly Election, 2017: Sabarmati
Party	Candidate	Votes	%	±%
BJP	Arvindkumar Gandalal Patel	113,503	67.99	
INC	Dr. Jitubhai Babubhai Patel	44,693	26.77	
IND.	Valjibhai Odharbhai Desai	1,865	1.12	
SS	Ashok Deendayal Sharma	1,324	0.79	
BSP	Maheshkumar Kanjibhai Makwana	784	0.47	
NOTA	None of the Above	2,856	1.71	
Majority		68,810	41.22	
Turnout		1,66,936	65.83	
BJP hold		Swing		

=== 2012 ===
Gujarat Legislative Assembly Election, 2012: Sabarmati
Party	Candidate	Votes	%	±%
BJP	Arvindkumar Gandalal Patel	1,07,036	70.50	
INC	Bharatkumar Govindlal Patel	39,453	25.99	
GPP	Bipin Kantilal Panchal	1,943	1.28	
NSM	Dr. Mukul Sinha	1,860	1.23	
BSP	Devendra Danabhai Parmar	1,527	1.01	
Majority		67,583	44.51	
Turnout		1,51,819	70.29	
BJP hold		Swing		

== See also ==
- List of constituencies of the Gujarat Legislative Assembly
- Ahmedabad district
