= Matana, Gir Somnath =

Village in Gujarat state, India

Matana is a village in Sutrapada Taluka, Gir Somnath district of Gujarat state, India.
