= Amodra =

- village
- Location in Gujarat, India Amodra (India)
- Coordinates: 20.81°N 71.05°E
- Country: India
- State: Gujarat
- District: Gir somnath

Population
  - Total: 5,230

Languages
  - Official: Gujarati, Hindi, English
- Time zone: UTC+5:30 (IST)
- PIN: 362560
- Vehicle registration: GJ
- Nearest city: Una, Gujarat
- Website: gujaratindia.com

Amodra is a small village in Una Taluka of Gir Somnath District in Gujarat. The distance between Amodra and Una is around 6 km.

Its population is around 5,230. In Amodra village the predominant population is of the Karadia Rajput clan and schedule caste peoples. Most of the population of Amodra village are farmers and some are merchants. The land of Amodra is very fertile and the main crops of the village are groundnuts, sugarcane, and cotton.

Ajitbhai Mori has been Sarpanch of Amodra village since 2021. He has developed public works including street lights, solid waste management, and water management in the village immensely.

The village is full of ritual temples having religious belief. During Chaitra (April) there are four Sunday festivals, and all faithful people from various surrounding villages come to Amodra and go to various temples, such as Randal Maa, Shitala Maa, Khodiyar Maa, and Chamunda Maa.

In Amodra, there are many religious activities in which there is a group of Khufiya groups, a team of 30 members who celebrate festivals like Holi Festival, Ramanavami Festival, Janmashtami Festival, and Ganesh Chaturthi Festival in the village.
