= Junagadh Assembly constituency =

Legislative Assembly constituency in Gujarat State, India

Coordinates: 23.08°N 74.17°E

Junagadh
- Constituency No. 86 for the Gujarat Legislative Assembly

Constituency details
- Country: India
- Region: Western India
- State: Gujarat
- District: Junagadh
- Lok Sabha constituency: Junagadh
- Established: 1962
- Total electors: 287,816
- Reservation: None

Member of Legislative Assembly
- 15th Gujarat Legislative Assembly
- Incumbent Sanjay Sukhabhai Koradia
- Party: Bharatiya Janata Party
- Elected year: 2022

Junagadh is one of the 182 Legislative Assembly constituencies of Gujarat state in India. It is part of Junagadh district.

Current MLA Website

- Sanjay Koradia

== List of segments ==
This assembly seat represents the following segments:

- Junagadh Taluka (Part) Villages – Goladhar, Vadasimdi, Vanandiya, Jhalansar, Makhiyala, Pipardi Timbo, Majevdi, Patrapsar, Ambaliya, Rupavati, Taliyadhar, Vadhavi, Virpur, Galiyavada, Khalilpur, Sagdividi, Ivnagar, Palasva, Padariya, Datar Hills.
- Junagadh Taluka (Part) – Junagadh Municipal Corporation Ward No.-1, 2, 3, 4, 5, 6, 7, 8, 10, 11, 12, 13, 14, 15, 16,17.

== Members of Legislative Assembly ==
Year	Member	Party
1962	Divyakant Kundanlal Nanavati	Indian National Congress
1967	P. K. Dave	Indian National Congress
1972	Divyakant Kundanlal Nanavati	Indian National Congress
1975	Hemaben Acharya	Bharatiya Jan Sangh
1980	Gordhanbhai Patel	Indian National Congress (I)
1985	Gordhanbhai Patel	Indian National Congress
1990	Mahendra Mashru	Independent politician
1995	Mahendra Mashru	Independent politician
1998	Mahendra Mashru	Bharatiya Janata Party
2002	Mahendra Mashru	Bharatiya Janata Party
2007	Mahendra Mashru	Bharatiya Janata Party
2012	Mahendra Mashru	Bharatiya Janata Party
2017	Bhikhabhai Galabhai Joshi	Indian National Congress
2022	Sanjay Koradia	Bharatiya Janata Party

== Election results ==
=== 2022 ===
Gujarat Assembly election, 2022:Junagadh Assembly constituency
Party	Candidate	Votes	%	±%
BJP	Sanjay Koradia	84,616	52.01	
INC	Joshi Bhikhabhai Galabhai	44,360	27.26	
AAP	Chetankumar Harsukhbhai Gajera	28,306	17.4	
NOTA	None of the above	2,002	1.23	
Majority		40,256	24.75	
Turnout				
Registered electors		284,913		
BJP gain from INC		Swing		

=== 2017 ===
Gujarat Legislative Assembly Election, 2017: Junagadh
Party	Candidate	Votes	%	±%
INC	Joshi Bhikhabhai Galabhai			
NOTA	None of the Above			
Majority				
Turnout				

=== 2012 ===
Gujarat Assembly Election, 2012
Party	Candidate	Votes	%	±%
BJP	Mahendra Mashru	66,669	46.40	
INC	Bhikhabhai Joshi	52,873	36.80	
Majority		13,796	9.60	
Turnout		143,695	62.04	
BJP hold		Swing		

== See also ==
- List of constituencies of Gujarat Legislative Assembly
- Gujarat Legislative Assembly
