= Chandrika Chudasama =

Indian politician

Chandrikaben Kanjibhai Chudasama is an Indian politician, former state minister and former Member of legislative assembly from Mangrol constituency and belong to the Indian National Congress party and the Koli caste of Gujarat.
