= Somnath Assembly constituency =

Legislative Assembly constituency in Gujarat State, India

Coordinates: 20.91°N 70.39°E

Somnath
- Constituency No. 90 for the Gujarat Legislative Assembly

Constituency details
- Country: India
- Region: Western India
- State: Gujarat
- District: Gir Somnath
- Lok Sabha constituency: Junagadh
- Established: 1962
- Total electors: 263,176
- Reservation: None

Member of Legislative Assembly
- 15th Gujarat Legislative Assembly
- Incumbent Vimal Chudasama
- Party: Indian National Congress
- Elected year: 2022

Somnath is one of the 182 Legislative Assembly constituencies of Gujarat state in India. It is part of Gir Somnath district.

== List of segments ==
This assembly seat represents the following segments, also this assembly has major city Somnath and 53 villages. Somnath is also in this assembly so this is important to win for all parties. Gir Somnath district's main capital is Somnath.

== Members of the Legislative Assembly ==
Year	Member	Party
1962	Ramanlal Prabhudas Shah	Indian National Congress
1967	K. B. Dodiya	Swatantra Party
1972	Kesar Bhagvan Dodiya	Indian National Congress
1975	Ayashabegun Mohmedali Sheikh	Indian National Congress
1980	Rudabhai Devshi Vadher	Janata Party
1985	Baloch M. F.	Indian National Congress
1990	Jashubhai Barad	Janata Dal
1995	Jashubhai Barad	Indian National Congress
1998	Chunilal Kanji Gohel	Bharatiya Janata Party
2002	Jashubhai Barad	Indian National Congress
2007	Rajshi Jotva	Bharatiya Janata Party
2012	Jashabhai barad	Indian National Congress
2014^	Jashabhai barad	Bharatiya Janata Party
2017	Vimal Chudasama	Indian National Congress
2022	Vimal Chudasama	Indian National Congress

== Election results ==
=== 2022 ===
Gujarat Assembly election, 2022: Somnath Assembly constituency
Party	Candidate	Votes	%	±%
INC	Vimal Chudasama	73,819	38.2	−15.01
BJP	Mansingh Parmar	72,891	37.72	−4.03
AAP	Jagmal Vala	33,235	17.2	New
Independent	Ishwarlal Soneri	7,381	3.82	New
NOTA	None of the above	1,530	0.79	−1.37
Majority		922	0.1	−0.1
Turnout		1,93,263	60	−15.98
Registered electors		2,35,083		
INC hold		Swing	-0.48	

=== 2017 ===
Gujarat Legislative Assembly Election, 2017: Somnath
Party	Candidate	Votes	%	±%
INC	Vimalbhai Chudasama	94,914	--	−−
BJP	Jasabhai Barad	74,464	--	−−
Majority				
Turnout		1,78,617	75.98	
Registered electors		235,083		
INC gain from BJP		Swing		

=== 2014 ===
By-election, 2014: Somnath
Party	Candidate	Votes	%	±%
BJP	Jasabhai Barad	86,640	52.60	+18.01
INC	Dr. Nishant Chotai	60,671	37.01	+1.11
Majority		25,669	15.59	+14.26
Turnout		164,724	75.26	−1.48
BJP gain from INC		Swing		

=== 2012 ===
2012 Gujarat Legislative Assembly election: Somnath
Party	Candidate	Votes	%	±%
INC	Jasabhai Barad	56701	35.90	
BJP	Rajsibhai Jotva	54605	34.58	
Majority		2096	1.33	
Turnout		157925	76.74	
INC gain from BJP		Swing		

== See also ==
- List of constituencies of Gujarat Legislative Assembly
- Gujarat Legislative Assembly
