= Junagadh Agricultural University =

Agricultural university in Junagadh, India

- Motto: कृषिमूलम् जगत सर्वम् |
- Type: Public
- Established: 2004
- Affiliations: Indian Council of Agricultural Research
- Chancellor: Governor of Gujarat
- Vice-Chancellor: Dr. V. P. Chovatia
- Location: Junagadh, Gujarat, India; 21°30′22″N 70°26′58″E
- Campus: Urban
- Website: www.jau.in
- Location within Gujarat Location within India

Junagadh Agricultural University (JAU) is a public state agricultural university at Junagadh in the Indian state of Gujarat. Junagadh Agricultural University offers education in agriculture and allied sciences, i.e., agriculture, agricultural engineering and fisheries.

The teaching in the university consists of four faculties: agriculture, agricultural engineering, fisheries and postgraduate studies. The graduate programmes have an intake capacity of 135 in agriculture, 70 in agricultural engineering and 30 in fisheries faculty. The postgraduate level studies are offered in agriculture and agricultural engineering according to the intake capacity of the various faculties.

There are seven multidisciplinary Main Research Stations; five Main Research Stations for various crops; and eleven sub-Research Stations/Testing Centres for the development of new varieties/hybrids of crops, vegetables and fruits. These centres also work for the development of economical and sustainable production technology packages for newly developed varieties/hybrids with modification every year. The first hybrid bajra and hybrid castor were developed by scientists of this university.

In June 2016, the University was in news when its Food Testing Lab found traces of gold in Gir cow urine.

== History ==
The College of Agriculture, Junagadh started in June 1960. The college was affiliated to Gujarat University, Ahmedabad until 1967. Affiliation was transferred to Saurashtra University in 1968.

The Gujarat Agricultural University was established in February 1972 but split into four Universities in 2004 (Gujarat Agricultural University Act - 2004). Junagadh Agricultural University is one of them; it started on 1 May 2004.

== Education ==
- College of Agriculture, Junagadh
- College of Agricultural Engineering & Technology, Junagadh
- College of Agriculture, Amreli
- ASPEE College of Agriculture, Khapat(Porbandar)
- Post Graduate Institute of Agri. Business Management, Junagadh
- Polytechnic in Horticulture, Junagadh
- Polytechnic in Agriculture, Amreli
- Polytechnic in Agricultural Science, Halvad
- Polytechnic in Agro-processing, Junagadh
- Polytechnic in Agriculture, Dhari
- Polytechnic in Agricultural Engineering, Targhadia(Rajkot)

== Research centres ==
=== North West Agro-climatic Zone No. V ===
- Agricultural Research Station, Halvad (Dist.: Morbi)

=== North Saurashtra Agro-climatic Zone No. VI ===
- Main Dry Farming Research Station, Targhadia (Dist.: Rajkot)
- Main Pearl Millet Research Station, Jamnagar
- Agricultural Research Station, Amreli
- Grassland & Agricultural Research Station, Dhari (Dist.: Amreli)
- Dry Farming Research Station, Jam Khambhalia (Dist.: Dev Bhumi Dwarka)
- Fisheries Research Station, Okha (Dist.: Dev Bhumi Dwarka)
- Fisheries Research Station, Sikka (Dist.: Jamnagar)
- Cotton Research Station, Kukada (Dist.: Surendranagar)
- Bull Mother Farm, Amreli

=== South Saurashtra Agro-climatic Zone No. VII ===
- Main Oilseeds Research Station (Groundnut), Junagadh
- Wheat Research Station, Junagadh
- Cotton Research Station, Junagadh
- Castor Research Station, Junagadh
- Main Sugarcane Research Station, Kodinar (Dist.: Gir Somnath)
- Pulses Research Station, Junagadh
- Cattle Breeding Farm, Junagadh
- Vegetable Research Station, Junagadh
- Research, Training & Testing Centre (RTTC), Junagadh
- Centre of Experimental Research Station, Sagadividi, Junagadh
- Agriculture Research Station (Fruit Crops), Mahuva (Dist.: Bhavnagar)
- Inland Fisheries Research Station, Junagadh
- Oilseeds Research Station, Manavadar (Dist.: Junagadh)
- Cotton Research Station, Khapat (Dist.: Porbandar)
- Fruit Research Station, Mangrol (Dist.: Junagadh)
- Dry Farming Research Station, Ratia (Dist.: Porbandar)
- Fisheries Research & Training Center, Mahuva (Dist.: Bhavnagar)
- Agriculture Research Station, Talaja (Dist.: Bhavnagar)
- Grassland Center, Jonpur (Dist.: Junagadh)
- Spices Research Station, Junagadh

=== Bhal & Coastal Agro-climatic Zone No. VIII ===
- Dry Farming Research Station, Vallabhipur (Dist.: Bhavnagar)

== Extension Education Centres ==
- Directorate of Extension Education, Junagadh
- Krishi Vigyan Kendras (KVKs):

- Krishi Vigyan Kendra, Jamnagar
- Krishi Vigyan Kendra, Targhadia (Rajkot)
- Krishi Vigyan Kendra, Nana Kandhasar
- Krishi Vigyan Kendra, Khapat (Porbandar)
- Krishi Vigyan Kendra, Amreli
- Krishi Vigyan Kendra, Pipaliya

- Sardar Smruti Kendra (SSK), Junagadh
- Agriculture Technology Information Center (ATIC), Junagadh
- Centre of Communication Net work (COC), Junagadh
- School of Baking, Junagadh
- Mali Training Centre, Junagadh
