= Samma =

Samma may refer to:

- Samma (tribe), a Sindhi clan in Pakistan and India
- Samma, Estonia, a village in Viru-Nigula Parish, Lääne-Viru County, Estonia
- Samma, Jordan, a village in Irbid Governorate, northern Jordan
- Samma dynasty, a 14th century dynasty in Sindh, parts of Balochistan and Punjab
- Sultan Samma (born 1986), Indonesian footballer
