= GMERS Medical College and Hospital, Junagadh =

Medical college in Junagadh, Gujarat

- Type: Medical College and Hospital
- Established: 2015; 10 years ago
- Dean: Dr. Hanmant S. Amane
- Address: Junagadh, Gujarat, India
- Affiliations: Bhakta Kavi Narsinh Mehta University
- Website: http://gmersmcjunagadh.org/

GMERS Medical College and Hospital, Junagadh, established in 2015, is a medical college situated in Junagadh, Gujarat. The college imparts the degree Bachelor of Medicine and Surgery (MBBS). Nursing and para-medical courses are also offered. The college is affiliated with Bhakta Kavi Narsinh Mehta University and is recognized by the National Medical Commission. The hospital associated with the college is one of the largest hospitals in the Junagadh. The student selection is based on merit through National Eligibility and Entrance Test. The yearly undergraduate student intake is 150.

== Courses ==
GMERS Medical College and Hospital, Junagadh, undertakes education and training of students in MBBS courses. This college is offering 150 MBBS seats from 2019 of which 85% of Seats are of state quota, and 15% are for Nation Counselling.
