= Bhagabhai Dhanabhai Barad =

Indian politician

Bhagobhai Dhanabhai Barad
- ભગાભાઈ ધનાભાઈ બારડ

Member of Gujarat Legislative Assembly for Talala Assembly constituency
- Incumbent
- Assumed office (2007-2012), (2017-2022), (2022-Present)
- Preceded by: Govindbhai Parmar
- Constituency: Talala

Personal details
- Party: Bharatiya Janata Party
- Other political affiliations: INC
- Occupation: Politician
- Profession: Builder

Bhagabhai Dhanabhai Barad is an Indian politician and a member of Talala Assembly constituency of Gujarat Legislative Assembly. He was elected as MLA in 2017 from Talala Assembly constituency as a member of INC. In 2022 he left Congress and joined Bhartiya Janta Party.

In 2022 Gujarat Legislative Assembly election he was re-elected for MLA from Talala Assembly constituency as member of BJP.
