= Bhagvanjibhai Karagatiya =

Indian politician

Bhagvan Karagatiya

Member of Gujarat Legislative Assembly
- Incumbent
- Assumed office (1998-2002), (2007-2012), (2022-Present)
- Preceded by: Babubhai Vaja
- Constituency: Mangrol

Personal details
- Born: 22 December 1957 (age 68)
- Party: Bhartiya Janata Party

Bhagvan Lakhabhai Karagatiya (born 1957) is an Indian politician from Gujarat. He is a Member of the 12th Gujarat Legislative Assembly from Mangrol, Junagadh Assembly constituency representing the Bharatiya Janata Party.

== Early life and education ==
Karagatiya is from Mangrol, Junagadh district, Gujarat. He is the son of Kargatiya Lakhabhai. He studied Class 10 and did C.P.Ed. at Amravati Hanuman Akhada and passed the old SSC examinations in 1978. Later, he discontinued his studies.

== Career ==
Karagatiya won from Mangrol Assembly constituency representing the Bharatiya Janata Party in the 2022 Gujarat Legislative Assembly election. He polled 60,896 votes and defeated his nearest rival Babu Vaja of the Indian National Congress by a margin of 22,501 votes. He first became an MLA winning the 2007 Gujarat Legislative Assembly election.
