= Gir Somnath district =

- District of Gujarat
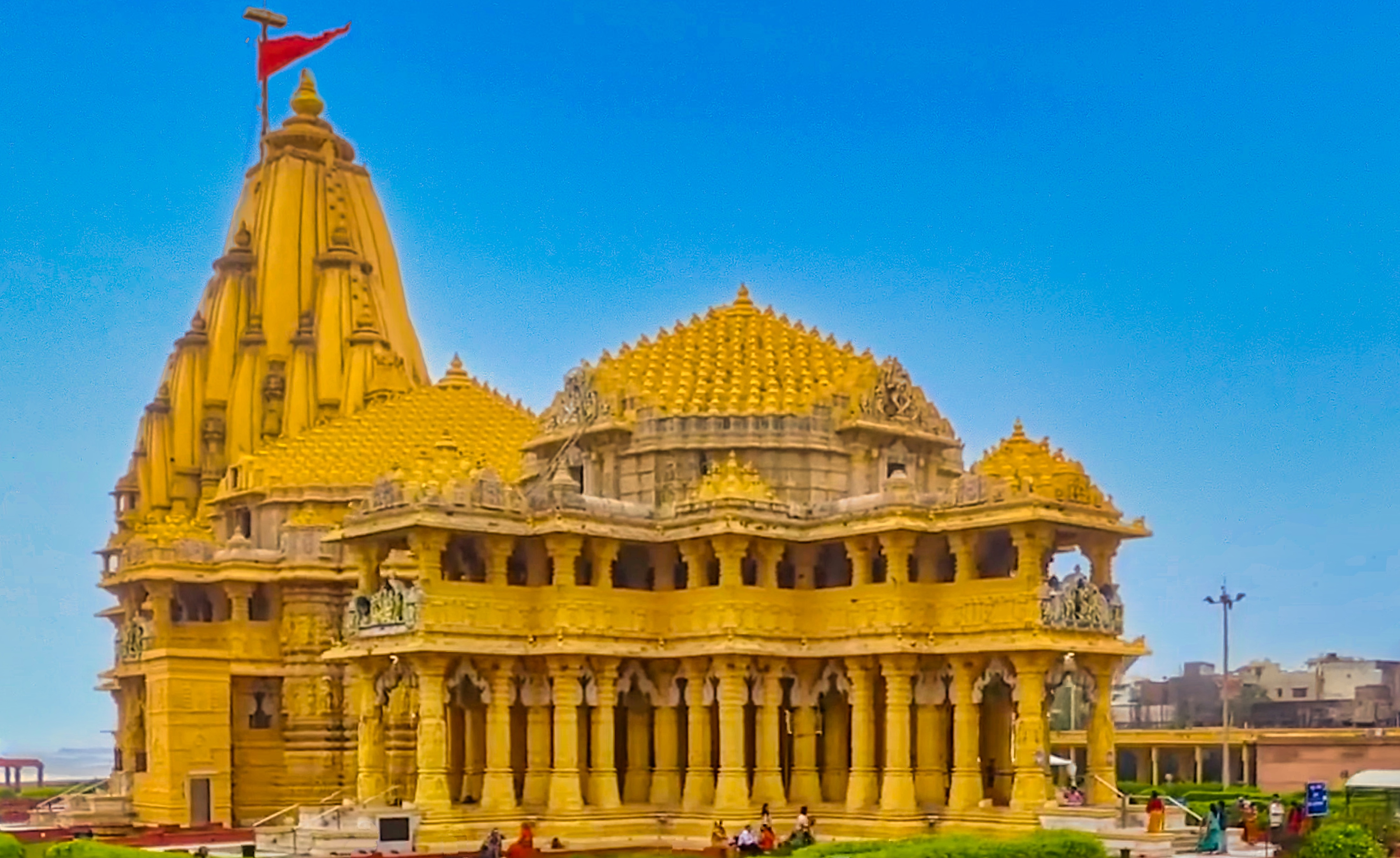
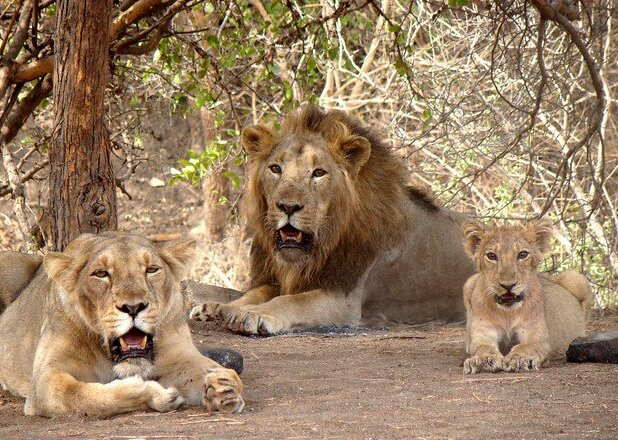
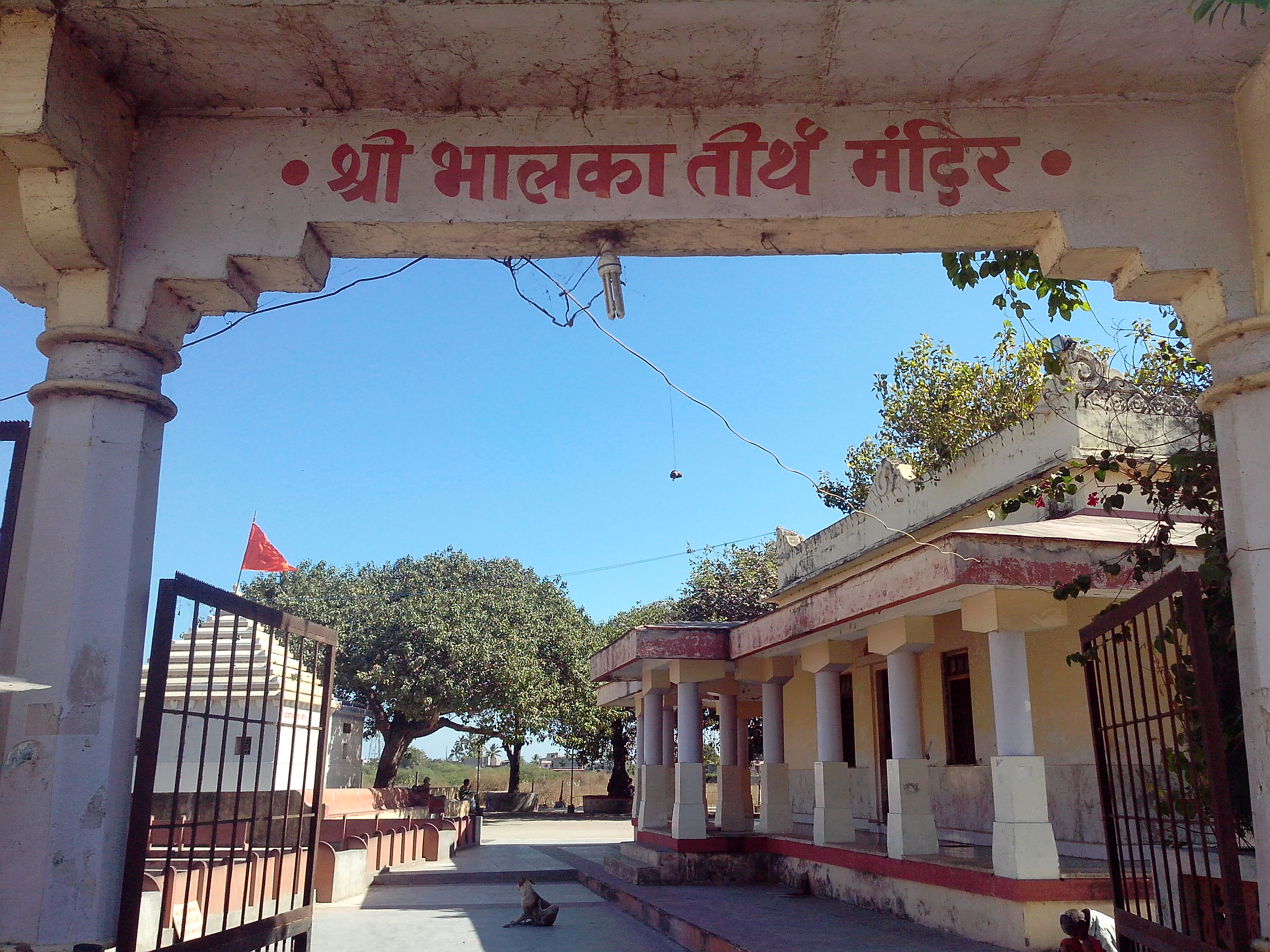
- Top: Somnath temple Middle: Gir National Park; Bottom: Bhalka Tirtha

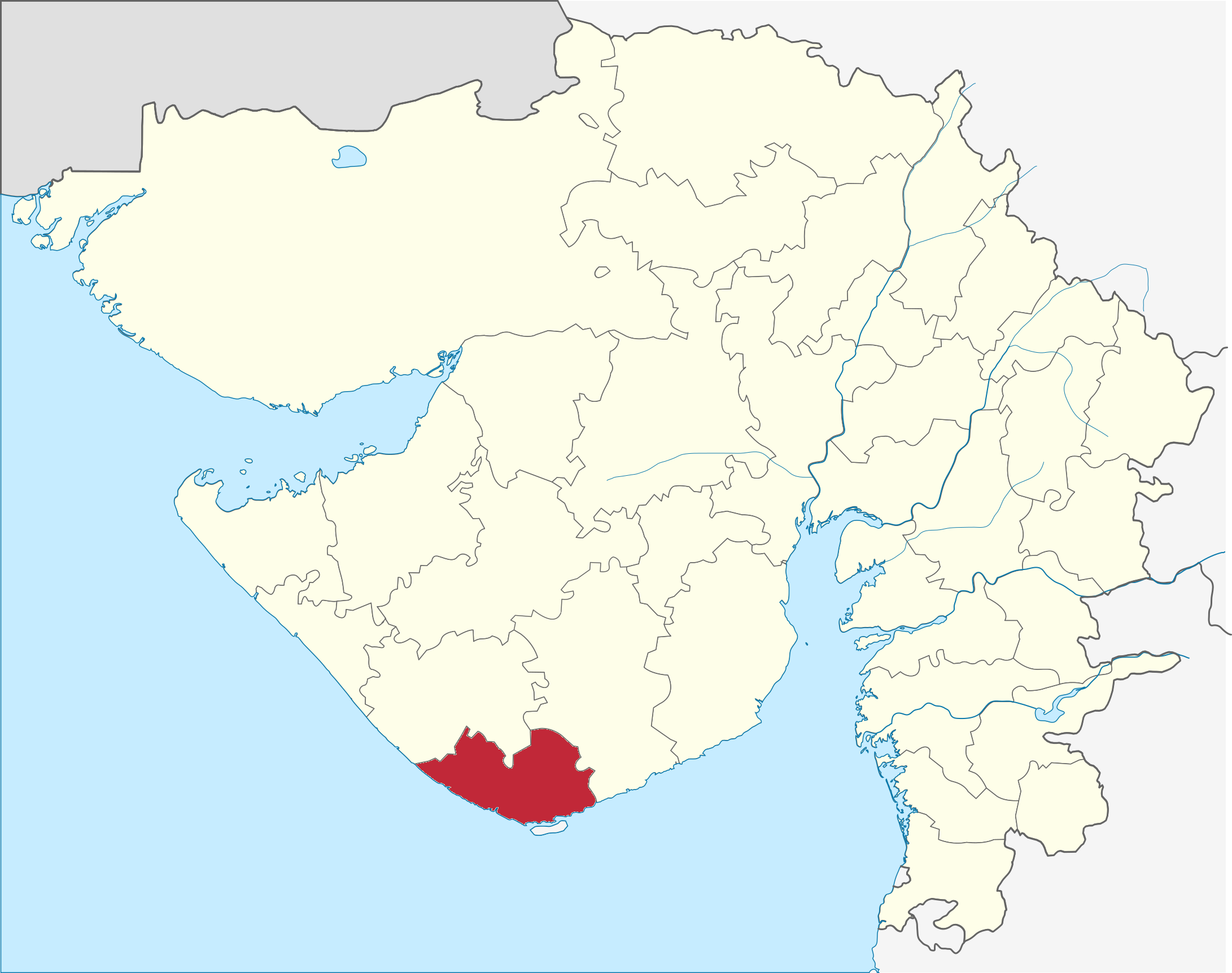
- Location of district in Gujarat
- Interactive map of Gir Somnath district
- Coordinates: 20°53′49″N 70°36′31″E
- Country: India
- State: Gujarat
- Region: Saurashtra
- Headquarters: Somnath

Government
  - District Magistrate: DigvijaySinh Jadeja, IAS
  - Superintendent of Police: Manoharsinh Jadeja, IPS

Area
  - Total: 3,755 km^{2} (1,450 sq mi)

Population (2011)
  - Total: 1,217,477
  - Density: 324.2/km^{2} (839.7/sq mi)

Languages
  - Official: Gujarati, Hindi, English
- Time zone: UTC+5:30 (IST)
- Vehicle registration: GJ 32
- Website: girsomnath.nic.in

Gir Somnath district is a district of Gujarat, India. Gir somnath district is located on the southern corner of the Kathiawar peninsula with its headquarters at the city of Somnath.

Gir Somnath was split from Junagadh district in August 2013, when seven new districts came into existence in Gujarat.

Veraval, Talala, Sutrapada, Kodinar, Una and Gir-Gadhada are the talukas of Gir Somnath.

The Gir Forest is a home of many wildlife creatures including lions, deer, and monkeys. Asiatic Lions can be only be found in the Gir Forest.

== Demographics ==
At the time of the 2011 census, Gir-Somnath district has a population of 1,217,477, of which 333,009 (27.35%) lived in urban areas. Gir-Somnath had a sex ratio of 964 females per 1000 males. Scheduled Castes and Scheduled Tribes made up 113,822 (9.35%) and 17,761 (1.46%) of the population respectively.

Religions in Gir Somnath district (2011)
Religion	Percent
Hinduism	86.14%
Islam	13.52%
Other or not stated	0.34%

Hindus are 1,048,741 (86.14%) and Muslims 164,520 (13.52%) of the population respectively.

Languages of Gir Somnath district (2011)
1. Gujarati (96.1%)
2. Hindi (1.70%)
3. Others (2.21%)

At the time of the 2011 census 96.09% of the population spoke Gujarati and 1.70% Hindi as their first language.

== Politics ==
District	No.	Constituency	Name	Party	Remarks
Gir Somnath	90	Somnath	Vimal Chudasama	Indian National Congress	
Gir Somnath	91	Talala	Bhagabhai Barad	Bharatiya Janata Party	
Gir Somnath	92	Kodinar (SC)	Pradyuman Vaja	Bharatiya Janata Party	
Gir Somnath	93	Una	Kalubhai Rathod	Bharatiya Janata Party	

== Villages ==
- Amodra
- Bhuvavada
- Delwada
- Matana
- Supasi
- Malgam
- Gangetha
- Meghpur
- Vansavad

== See also ==
- Sasan Gir
- Somnath temple
- Veraval
- Veraval Chowpati
- Bhalka Tirth
