= Vimal Chudasama =

Indian politician

Vimalbhai Kanabhai Chudasama

Member of Gujarat Legislative Assembly
- Incumbent
- Assumed office 2017-2022,2022-Present
- Preceded by: Jasabhai Barad
- Constituency: Somnath

Personal details
- Born: Vimalbhai Kanabhai Chudasama; 9 August 1980 (age 45) Chorwad, Junagadh district, Gujarat, India
- Citizenship: Indian
- Party: Indian National Congress
- Spouse: Jalpaben Chudasama
- Parent: Kanabhai Hirabhai Chudasama (father)
- Occupation: Agriculturist

Vimalbhai Kanabhai Chudasama is an Indian politician and member of the Gujarat Legislative Assembly from Somnath representing the Indian National Congress party. He is a first time MLA and belong to the Koli caste of Gujarat.
