= Junagadh district =

- District of Gujarat
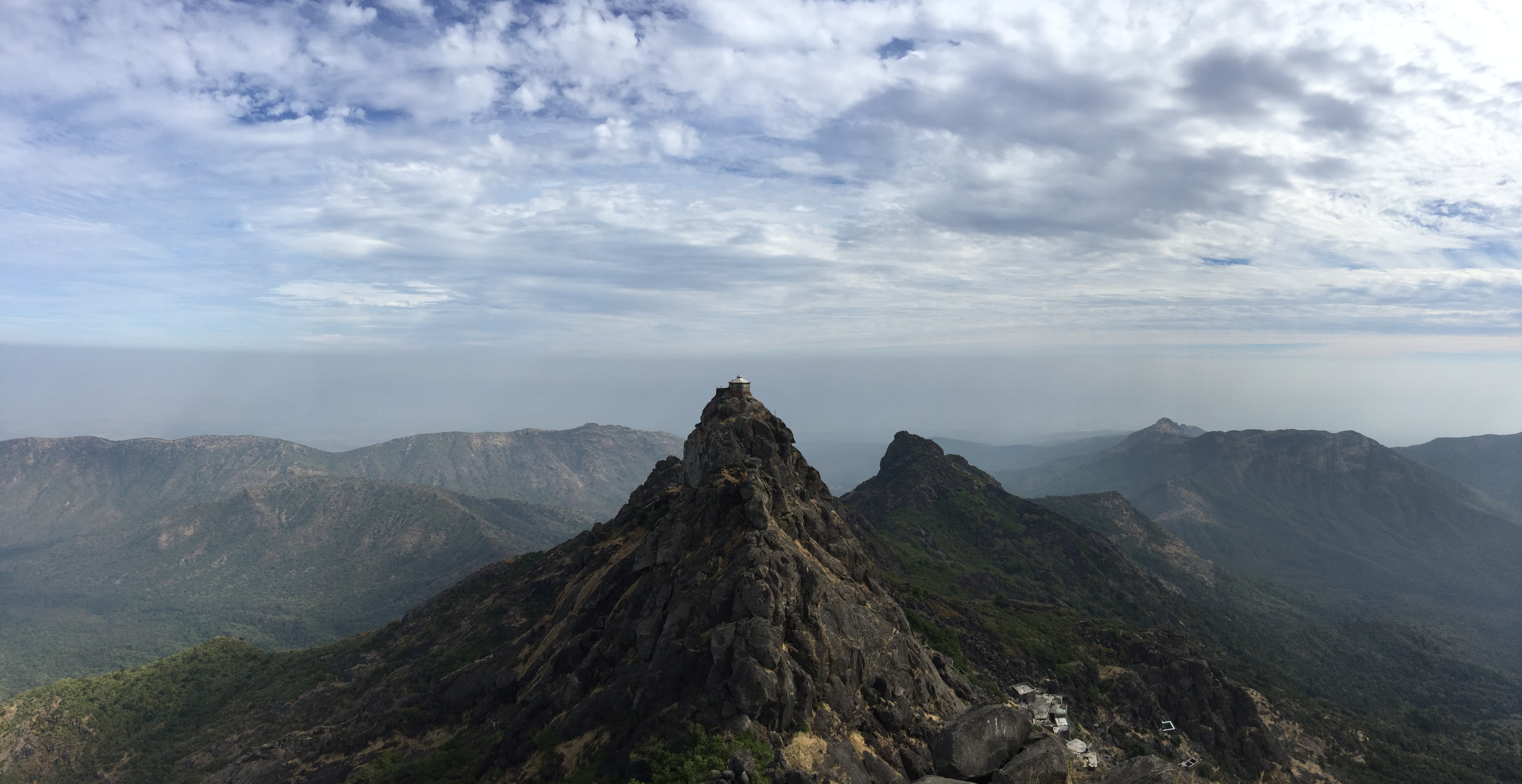
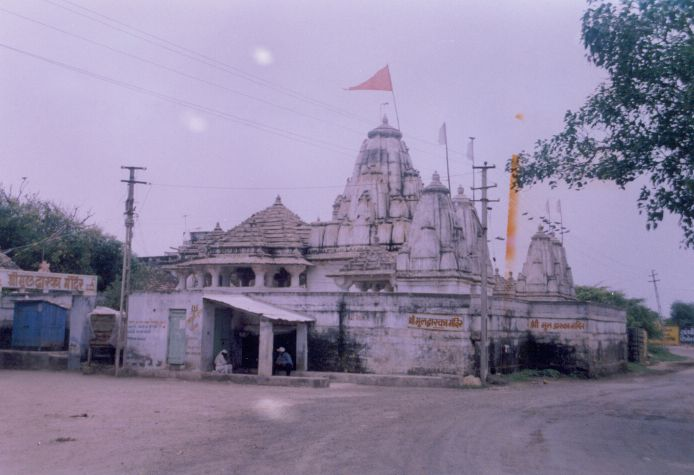
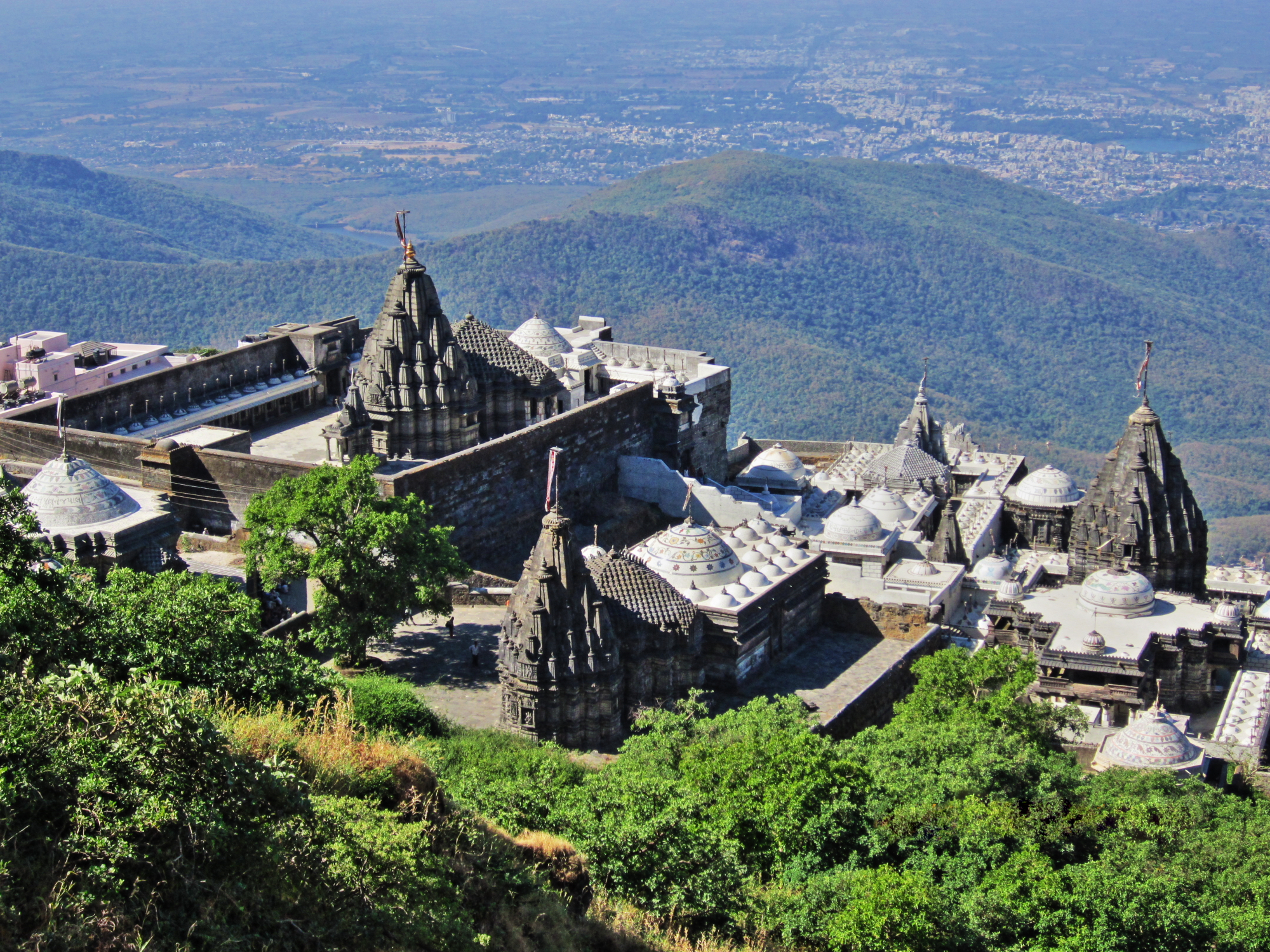
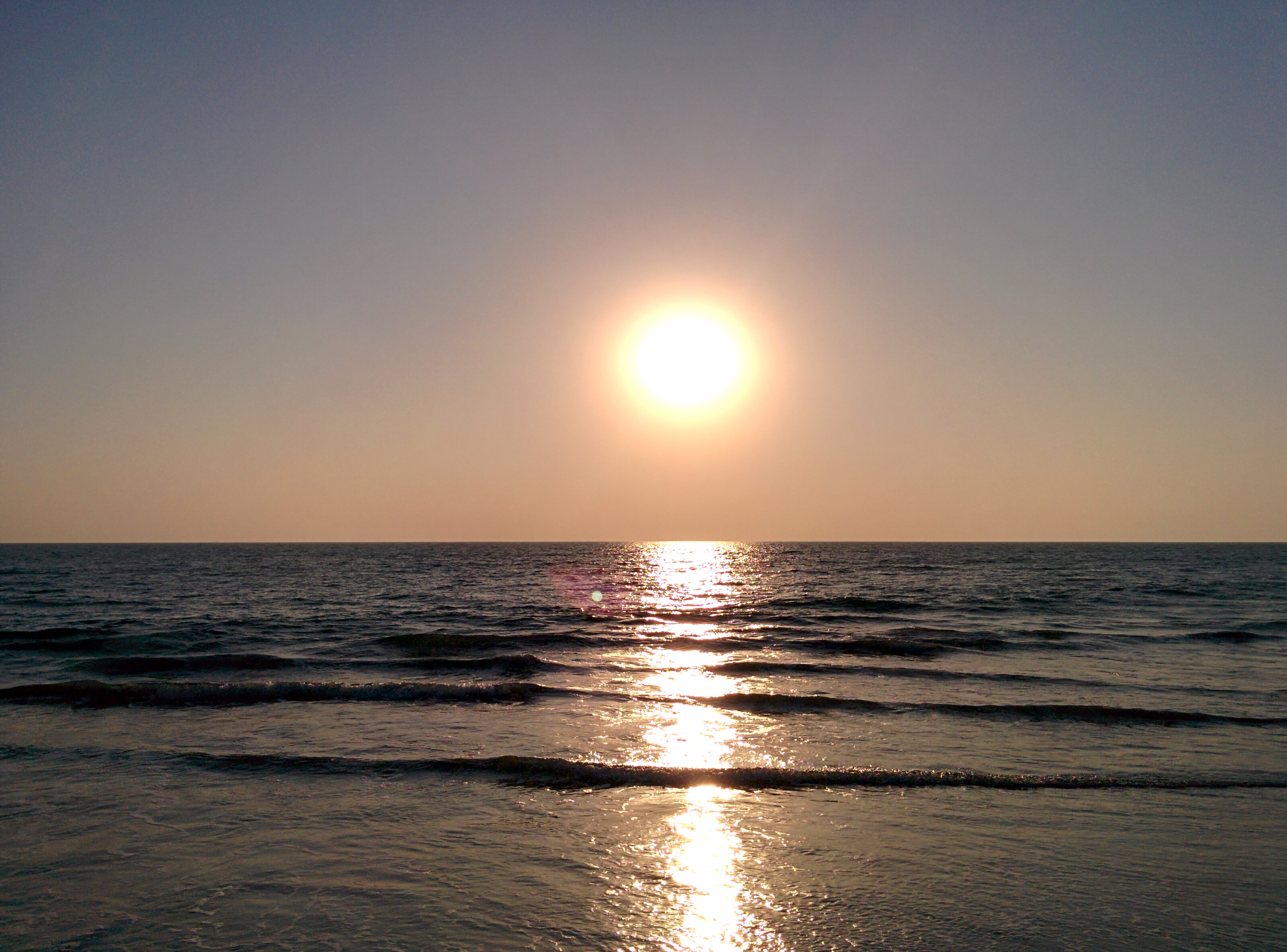
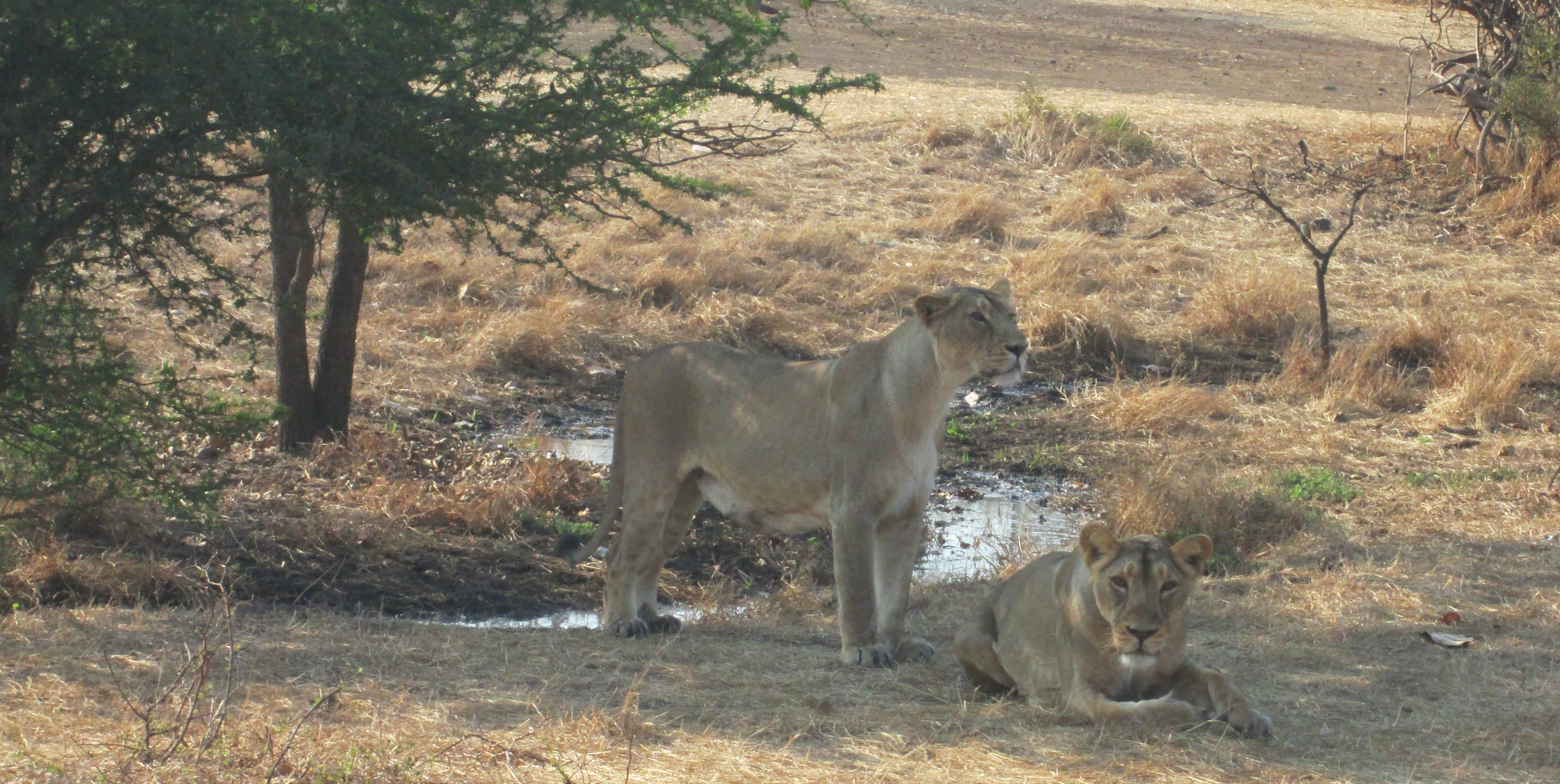
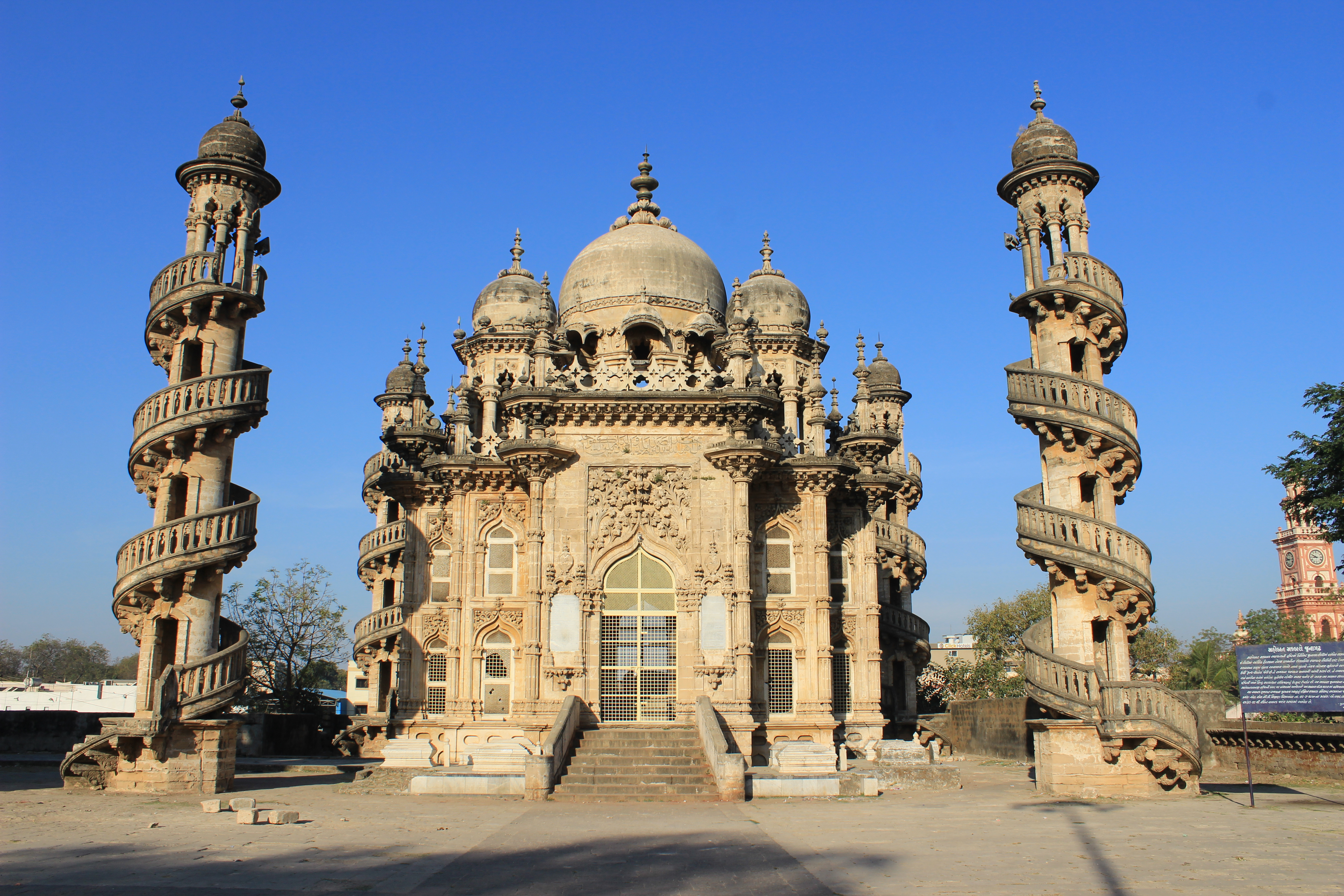
- Clockwise from top-left: Girnar, Mul Dwarka temple in Visavadar, Shil beach, Mahabat Maqbara in Junagadh, Lions in Devalia Safari Park, Girnar Jain temples

- Location of Junagadh district in Gujarat
- Interactive map of Junagadh district
- Coordinates: 21°31′N 70°27′E
- Country: India
- State: Gujarat
- Region: Saurashtra
- Headquarters: Junagadh

Area
  - Total: 5,093 km^{2} (1,966 sq mi)

Population (2011)
  - Total: 1,525,605
  - Density: 299.5/km^{2} (775.8/sq mi)

Languages
  - Official: Gujarati, Hindi
- Time zone: UTC+5:30 (IST)
- PIN: 362001
- Vehicle registration: GJ 11
- Website: junagadh.nic.in

Junagadh district is a district of the Indian state of Gujarat. Its administrative headquarters is the city of Junagadh.

== Geography ==
The district is located on the Kathiawar peninsula in western Gujarat. It is surrounded by Gir Somnath district (southeast), Rajkot district (north), Porbandar District (north-west), and Amreli district (east). To the south and west is the Arabian Sea.

Talukas of Junagadh are Junagadh City, Bhesan subdistrict, Junagadh Rural, Keshod - in this taluka only one Air-port on this entire Junagadh district, Malia, Manavadar, Mangrol, Mendarda, Vanthali, and Visavadar.

== Demographics ==
Historical population
Year	Pop.	±% p.a.
1901	415,521	—
1911	458,829	+1.00%
1921	491,969	+0.70%
1931	579,792	+1.66%
1941	729,508	+2.32%
1951	829,760	+1.30%
1961	1,051,074	+2.39%
1971	1,408,342	+2.97%
1981	1,813,780	+2.56%
1991	2,091,182	+1.43%
2001	2,448,173	+1.59%
2011	2,743,082	+1.14%

According to the 2011 census Junagadh district has a population of 2,743,082, roughly equal to the nation of Jamaica or the US state of Utah. This gives it a ranking of 142nd in India (out of a total of 640). The district has a population density of 310 inhabitants per square kilometre (800/sq mi). Its population growth rate over the decade 2001–2011 was 12.01%. Junagadh has a sex ratio of 952 females for every 1000 males. It had a literacy rate of 67.7% in 2001 which increased to a literacy rate of 76.88% in 2011.

The divided district has a population of 1,525,605, of which 573,403 (37.59%) lived in urban areas. Junagadh had a sex ratio of 945 females per 1000 males. Scheduled Castes and Scheduled Tribes are 151,971 (9.96%) and 37,810 (2.48%) of the population respectively.

Religions in Junagadh district (2011)
Hinduism	88.38%
Islam	11.17%
Other or not stated	0.45%
Distribution of religions

Hindus are 1,348,315 (88.38%) and Muslims 170,338 (11.17%) of the population respectively.

Gujarati was the predominant language, spoken by 97.44% of the population.

== Politics ==
District	No.	Constituency	Name	Party	Remarks
Junagarh	85	Manavadar	Arvindbhai Ladani	Indian National Congress	Resigned on 6 March 2024
Junagarh	85	Manavadar	Arvindbhai Ladani	Bharatiya Janata Party	Elected on 4 June 2024
Junagarh	86	Junagadh	Sanjay Koradiya	Bharatiya Janata Party	
Junagarh	87	Visavadar	Bhupendra Bhayani	Aam Aadmi Party	Resigned on 13 December 2023
Junagarh	87	Visavadar	Gopal Italia	Aam Aadmi Party	Elected on 23 June 2025
Junagarh	88	Keshod	Devabhai Malam	Bharatiya Janata Party	
Junagarh	89	Mangrol	Bhagvanjibhai Karagatiya	Bharatiya Janata Party	

== Notable personalities ==
- Narsinh Mehta (1414?–1481?), poet-saint, born in Talaja, Bhavnagar
- Putlibai Gandhi, mother of Mahatma Gandhi
- Keshubhai Patel (1928–2020), politician who served as Chief Minister of Gujarat, born in Visavadar in Junagadh
- Dhirubhai Ambani (1932–2002), business magnate and entrepreneur, born at Chorwad, Junagadh
- Rajendra Shukla (1942–), poet, born at Bantwa, Junagadh
- Parveen Babi (1949–2005), Bollywood actress, born at Junagadh
- Nawab Muhammad Mahabat Khan

== Flora and fauna ==
Junagadh contains the Gir Forest National Park, which is the only home to Asiatic lions. Mount Girnar is also declared a forest reserve for bamboo. Girnari Giddh, the long-billed vultures, are found only on Girnar, as the Girnar region alone accounts for about 25 per cent of the species and about 10 per cent of the total vulture population in the Gujarat state.

== Education ==
Educational and research institutions in the district include:

- Junagadh Agricultural University
- GMERS Medical College and Hospital, Junagadh
- Directorate of Groundnut Research
