= Ankolali =

- Village
- Location in Gujarat, India Ankolali (India)
- Coordinates: 20.866356°N 70.933183°E
- Country: India
- State: Gujarat
- District: Gir Somnath
- Taluka: Gir Gadhada

Government
  - Type: Panchayati raj (India)
  - Body: Gram panchayat

Area
  - Total: 267.46 ha (660.9 acres)

Population (2011)
  - Total: 1,056
  - Density: 394.8/km^{2} (1,023/sq mi)
- Sex ratio 532/524♂/♀

Languages
  - Official: Gujarati
- Time zone: UTC+5:30 (IST)
- PIN: 362560
- Vehicle registration: GJ
- Census code of Ankolali: 515289
- Nearest city: Gir Gadhada, Una
- Website: girsomnathdp.gujarat.gov.in

Ankolali is a village / panchayat located in the Gir Gadhada Taluka of Gir Somnath district in Gujarat State, India. Earlier, until August 2013, Ankolali was part of Una Taluka and Junagadh district. The latitude 20.866356 and longitude 70.933183 are the geo-coordinate of the Village Ankolali. Gandhinagar is the state capital of Ankolali village which is located around 400 kilometres away from Ankolali.

According to Census 2011, with the 176 families, the population of this village is 1056. Out of this, 532 are males and 524 are females. Most residents are dependent on agriculture.

== Demographics ==
According to the 2011 census of India, Ankolali has 176 households. The effective literacy rate (i.e. the literacy rate of population excluding children aged 6 and below) is 65.77%

Demographics (2011 Census)
	Total	Male	Female
Population	1056	532	524
Children aged below 6 years	162	75	87
Scheduled caste	14	8	6
Scheduled tribe	-	-	-
Literates	588	367	221
Illiterates	468	165	303
Total Workers	320	306	14
Main workers	315	301	14
Main workers: Cultivators	173	173	-
Main workers: Agricultural labourers	68	57	11
Main workers: Household industry workers	1	1	-
Main workers: Other	73	70	3
Marginal workers (total)	5	5	-
Marginal workers: Cultivators	-	-	-
Marginal workers: Agricultural labourers	-	-	-
Marginal workers: Household industry workers	-	-	-
Marginal workers: Others	5	5	-
Non-workers	736	226	510

== List of villages in Gir Gadhada Taluka ==
Below is the Revenue records list of forty-three villages of Gir Gadhada Taluka including Gir Gadhada village.

1. Ambavad
2. Ankolvadi
3. Babariya
4. Bediya
5. Bhakha
6. Bhiyal
7. Bodidar
8. Dhokadva
9. Dhrabavad
10. Dron
11. Fareda
12. Fatsar
13. Fulka
14. Gir Gadhada
15. Harmadiya
16. Itvaya
17. Jamvala
18. Jaragli
19. Jhanjhariya
20. Jhudvadli
21. Juna Ugla
22. Kanakiya
23. Kaneri
24. Kansariya
25. Khilavad
26. Kodiya
27. Mahobatpara
28. Motisar
29. Nagadiya
30. Nava Ugla
31. Nitli
32. Panderi
33. Rasulpara
34. Sanosri
35. Sanvav
36. Sonariya
37. Sonpura
38. Thordi
39. Umedpara
40. Undari
41. Vadli
42. Vadviyala
43. Velakot
