= Sonariya =

- Village
- Location in Gujarat, India Sonariya (India)
- Coordinates: 20.996221°N 71.120102°E
- Country: India
- State: Gujarat
- District: Gir Somnath
- Taluka: Gir Gadhada

Government
  - Type: Panchayati raj (India)
  - Body: Gram panchayat

Area
  - Total: 456.46 ha (1,127.9 acres)

Population (2011)
  - Total: 1,080
  - Density: 237/km^{2} (613/sq mi)
- Sex ratio 532/548♂/♀

Languages
  - Official: Gujarati
- Time zone: UTC+5:30 (IST)
- PIN: 362530
- Vehicle registration: GJ
- Census code of Sonariya: 515245
- Nearest city: Gir Gadhada, Una
- Website: girsomnathdp.gujarat.gov.in

Sonariya is a village / panchayat located in the Gir Gadhada Taluka of Gir Somnath district in Gujarat State, India. Earlier, until August 2013, Sonariya was part of Una Taluka and Junagadh district. The latitude 20.996221 and longitude 71.120102 are the geo-coordinate of the Village Sonariya. Gandhinagar is the state capital of Sonariya village which is located around 350 kilometres away from Sonariya.

According to Census 2011, with the 196 families, the population of this village is 1080. Out of this, 532 are males and 548 are females. Most residents are dependent on agriculture.

== Demographics ==
According to the 2011 census of India, Sonariya has 196 households. The effective literacy rate (i.e. the literacy rate of population excluding children aged 6 and below) is 61.82%

Demographics (2011 Census)
	Total	Male	Female
Population	1080	532	548
Children aged below 6 years	192	80	112
Scheduled caste	81	38	43
Scheduled tribe	-	-	-
Literates	549	337	212
Illiterates	531	195	336
Total Workers	513	314	199
Main workers	320	299	21
Main workers: Cultivators	82	81	1
Main workers: Agricultural labourers	146	129	17
Main workers: Household industry workers	-	-	-
Main workers: Other	92	89	3
Marginal workers (total)	193	15	178
Marginal workers: Cultivators	6	1	5
Marginal workers: Agricultural labourers	185	13	172
Marginal workers: Household industry workers	-	-	-
Marginal workers: Others	2	1	1
Non-workers	567	218	349

== List of Villages in Gir Gadhada Taluka ==
Below is the Revenue records list of forty-three villages of Gir Gadhada Taluka including Gir Gadhada village.

1. Ambavad
2. Ankolali
3. Babariya
4. Bediya
5. Bhakha
6. Bhiyal
7. Bodidar
8. Dhokadva
9. Dhrabavad
10. Dron
11. Fareda
12. Fatsar
13. Fulka
14. Gir Gadhada
15. Harmadiya
16. Itvaya
17. Jamvala
18. Jaragli
19. Jhanjhariya
20. Jhudvadli
21. Juna Ugla
22. Kanakiya
23. Kaneri
24. Kansariya
25. Khilavad
26. Kodiya
27. Mahobatpara
28. Motisar
29. Nagadiya
30. Nava Ugla
31. Nitli
32. Panderi
33. Rasulpara
34. Sanosri
35. Sanvav
36. Sonariya
37. Sonpura
38. Thordi
39. Umedpara
40. Undari
41. Vadli
42. Vadviyala
43. Velakot
