= Sanvav =

- Village
- Location in Gujarat, India Sanvav (India)
- Coordinates: 20.891855°N 70.909792°E
- Country: India
- State: Gujarat
- District: Gir Somnath
- Taluka: Gir Gadhada

Government
  - Type: Panchayati raj (India)
  - Body: Gram panchayat

Area
  - Total: 1,435.23 ha (3,546.5 acres)

Population (2011)
  - Total: 4,687
  - Density: 326.6/km^{2} (845.8/sq mi)
- Sex ratio 2422/2265♂/♀

Languages
  - Official: Gujarati
- Time zone: UTC+5:30 (IST)
- PIN: 362530
- Vehicle registration: GJ
- Census code of Sanvav: 515269
- Nearest city: Gir Gadhada, Una
- Website: girsomnathdp.gujarat.gov.in

Sanvav is a village (or panchayat) in the Gir Gadhada Taluka of Gir Somnath district in Gujarat, India. Until August 2013, it was part of Una Taluka and the Junagadh district. It is at latitude 20.891855 and longitude 70.909792. The state capital of Sanvav is Gandhinagar, around 400 kilometres (250 mi) from Sanvav.

== Demographics ==
At the 2011 Indian census, Sanvav's population was 4,687 in 843 families, with 2,422 males and 2,265 females.

Most of Sanvav's residents are dependent on agriculture. The effective literacy rate (excluding children aged 6 and below) is 65.98%

Demographics (2011 Census)
	Total	Male	Female
Population	4,687	2,422	2,265
Children aged below 6 years	639	337	302
Scheduled caste	147	81	66
Scheduled tribe	-	-	-
Literates	2,671	1,597	1,074
Illiterates	2,016	825	1,191
Total Workers	1,924	1,424	500
Main workers	1,678	1,393	285
Main workers: Cultivators	707	637	70
Main workers: Agricultural labourers	727	524	203
Main workers: Household industry workers	5	5	-
Main workers: Other	239	227	12
Marginal workers (total)	246	31	215
Marginal workers: Cultivators	67	4	63
Marginal workers: Agricultural labourers	167	19	148
Marginal workers: Household industry workers	1	-	1
Marginal workers: Others	11	8	3
Non-workers	2,763	998	1,765

== List of Villages in Gir Gadhada Taluka ==
Below is the Revenue records list of forty-three villages of Gir Gadhada Taluka including Gir Gadhada village.

1. Ambavad
2. Ankolali
3. Babariya
4. Bediya
5. Bhakha
6. Bhiyal
7. Bodidar
8. Dhokadva
9. Dhrabavad
10. Dron
11. Fareda
12. Fatsar
13. Fulka
14. Gir Gadhada
15. Harmadiya
16. Itvaya
17. Jamvala
18. Jaragli
19. Jhanjhariya
20. Jhudvadli
21. Juna Ugla
22. Kanakiya
23. Kaneri
24. Kansariya
25. Khilavad
26. Kodiya
27. Mahobatpara
28. Motisar
29. Nagadiya
30. Nava Ugla
31. Nitli
32. Panderi
33. Rasulpara
34. Sanosri
35. Sanvav
36. Sonariya
37. Sonpura
38. Thordi
39. Umedpara
40. Undari
41. Vadli
42. Vadviyala
43. Velakot
