= Kansariya =

- Village
- Location in Gujarat, India Kansariya (India)
- Coordinates: 20.969325°N 70.768261°E
- Country: India
- State: Gujarat
- District: Gir Somnath
- Taluka: Gir Gadhada

Government
  - Type: Panchayati raj (India)
  - Body: Gram panchayat

Area
  - Total: 297.54 ha (735.2 acres)

Population (2011)
  - Total: 204
  - Density: 68.6/km^{2} (178/sq mi)
- Sex ratio 113/91♂/♀

Languages
  - Official: Gujarati
- Time zone: UTC+5:30 (IST)
- PIN: 362530
- Vehicle registration: GJ
- Census code of Kansariya: 515235
- Nearest city: Gir Gadhada, Una
- Website: girsomnathdp.gujarat.gov.in

Kansariya, also known as Gir Kansariya, is a village / panchayat located in the Gir Gadhada Taluka of Gir Somnath district in Gujarat State, India. Earlier, until August 2013, Kansariya was part of Una Taluka and Junagadh district. The latitude 20.969325 and longitude 70.768261 are the geo-coordinate of the Village Kansariya. Gandhinagar is the state capital of Kansariya village which is located around 375 kilometres away from Kansariya.

According to Census 2011, with the 41 families, the population of this village is 204. Out of this, 113 are males and 91 are females. Most residents are dependent on agriculture.

== Demographics ==
According to the 2011 census of India, Kansariya has 41 households. The effective literacy rate (i.e. the literacy rate of population excluding children aged 6 and below) is 62.64%

Demographics (2011 Census)
| | Total | Male | Female |
|---|---|---|---|
| Population | 204 | 113 | 91 |
| Children aged below 6 years | 30 | 14 | 16 |
| Scheduled caste | - | - | - |
| Scheduled tribe | - | - | - |
| Literates | 109 | 74 | 35 |
| Illiterates | 95 | 39 | 56 |
| Total Workers | 136 | 75 | 61 |
| Main workers | 136 | 75 | 61 |
| Main workers: Cultivators | 12 | 5 | 7 |
| Main workers: Agricultural labourers | 122 | 68 | 54 |
| Main workers: Household industry workers | - | - | - |
| Main workers: Other | 2 | 2 | - |
| Marginal workers (total) | - | - | - |
| Marginal workers: Cultivators | - | - | - |
| Marginal workers: Agricultural labourers | - | - | - |
| Marginal workers: Household industry workers | - | - | - |
| Marginal workers: Others | - | - | - |
| Non-workers | 68 | 38 | 30 |

== List of Villages in Gir Gadhada Taluka ==
Below is the Revenue records list of forty-three villages of Gir Gadhada Taluka including Gir Gadhada village.

1. Ambavad
2. Ankolali
3. Babariya
4. Bediya
5. Bhakha
6. Bhiyal
7. Bodidar
8. Dhokadva
9. Dhrabavad
10. Dron
11. Fareda
12. Fatsar
13. Fulka
14. Gir Gadhada
15. Harmadiya
16. Itvaya
17. Jamvala
18. Jaragli
19. Jhanjhariya
20. Jhudvadli
21. Juna Ugla
22. Kanakiya
23. Kaneri
24. Kansariya
25. Khilavad
26. Kodiya
27. Mahobatpara
28. Motisar
29. Nagadiya
30. Nava Ugla
31. Nitli
32. Panderi
33. Rasulpara
34. Sanosri
35. Sanvav
36. Sonariya
37. Sonpura
38. Thordi
39. Umedpara
40. Undari
41. Vadli
42. Vadviyala
43. Velakot
