= Jhanjhariya =

- Village
- Location in Haryana, Gujarat, India Jhanjhariya (India)
- Coordinates: 20.857829°N 70.87836°E
- Country: India
- State: Gujarat, Haryana
- District: Gir Somnath
- Taluka: Gir Gadhada

Government
  - Type: Panchayati raj (India)
  - Body: Gram panchayat

Area
  - Total: 318.6 ha (787 acres)

Population (2011)
  - Total: 64,440
  - Density: 20,230/km^{2} (52,390/sq mi)
- Sex ratio 323/317♂/♀

Languages
  - Official: Gujarati
- Time zone: UTC+5:30 (IST)
- PIN: 362560
- Vehicle registration: GJ
- Census code of Jhanjhariya: 515293
- Nearest city: Gir Gadhada, Una
- Website: girsomnathdp.gujarat.gov.in

Jhanjhariya, also misspelled Janjariya or Zanjariya, is a village or panchayat located in the Gir Gadhada Taluka of Gir Somnath district in Gujarat State, India. Until August 2013, Jhanjhariya was part of Una Taluka and Junagadh districts. The latitude 20.857829 and longitude 70.87836 are the geo-coordinates of the village of Jhanjhariya. Gandhinagar is the state capital of Jhanjhariya village, which is located around 400 kilometres away from Jhanjhariya.

According to Census 2011, with 107 families, the population of this village is 640. Out of this, 323 are males and 317 are females. Most residents are dependent on agriculture.

== Demographics ==
According to the 2011 census of India, Jhanjhariya has 107 households. The literacy rate (excluding children aged 6 and below) is 77.29%.

Demographics (2011 Census)
	Total	Male	Female
Population	640	323	317
Children aged below 6 years	50	27	23
Scheduled caste	1	1	-
Scheduled tribe	-	-	-
Literates	456	254	202
Illiterates	184	69	115
Total Workers	241	182	59
Main workers	199	180	19
Main workers: Cultivators	112	111	1
Main workers: Agricultural labourers	36	24	12
Main workers: Household industry workers	-	-	-
Main workers: Other	51	45	6
Marginal workers (total)	42	2	40
Marginal workers: Cultivators	1	1	-
Marginal workers: Agricultural labourers	36	-	36
Marginal workers: Household industry workers	-	-	-
Marginal workers: Others	5	1	4
Non-workers	399	141	258

== List of villages in Gir Gadhada Taluka ==
Below is the Revenue records list of forty-three villages of Gir Gadhada Taluka including Gir Gadhada village.

1. Ambavad
2. Ankolali
3. Babariya
4. Bediya
5. Bhakha
6. Bhiyal
7. Bodidar
8. Dhokadva
9. Dhrabavad
10. Dron
11. Fareda
12. Fatsar
13. Fulka
14. Gir Gadhada
15. Harmadiya
16. Itvaya
17. Jamvala
18. Jaragli
19. Jhanjhariya
20. Jhudvadli
21. Juna Ugla
22. Kanakiya
23. Kaneri
24. Kansariya
25. Khilavad
26. Kodiya
27. Mahobatpara
28. Motisar
29. Nagadiya
30. Nava Ugla
31. Nitli
32. Panderi
33. Rasulpara
34. Sanosri
35. Sanvav
36. Sonariya
37. Sonpura
38. Thordi
39. Umedpara
40. Undari
41. Vadli
42. Vadviyala
43. Velakot
