= Harmadiya =

- Village
- Location in Gujarat, India Harmadiya (India)
- Coordinates: 20.927632°N 70.841389°E
- Country: India
- State: Gujarat
- District: Gir Somnath
- Taluka: Gir Gadhada

Government
  - Type: Panchayati raj (India)
  - Body: Gram panchayat

Area
  - Total: 2,597.17 ha (6,417.7 acres)

Population (2011)
  - Total: 6,439
  - Density: 247.9/km^{2} (642.1/sq mi)
- Sex ratio 3265/3174♂/♀

Languages
  - Official: Gujarati
- Time zone: UTC+5:30 (IST)
- PIN: 362710
- Vehicle registration: GJ
- Census code of Harmadiya: 515103
- Nearest city: Gir Gadhada, Una
- Website: girsomnathdp.gujarat.gov.in

Harmadiya is a village / panchayat located in the Gir Gadhada Taluka of Gir Somnath district in Gujarat State, India. Earlier, until August 2013, Harmadiya was part of Kodinar Taluka and Junagadh district. The latitude 20.927632 and longitude 70.841389 are the geo-coordinate of the Village Harmadiya. Gandhinagar is the state capital of Harmadiya village which is located around 400 kilometres away from Harmadiya.

According to Census 2011, with the 1167 families, the population of this village is 6439. Out of this, 3265 are males and 3174 are females. Most residents are dependent on agriculture.

== Demographics ==
According to the 2011 census of India, Harmadiya has 1167 households. The effective literacy rate (i.e. the literacy rate of population excluding children aged 6 and below) is 65.08%

Demographics (2011 Census)
| | Total | Male | Female |
|---|---|---|---|
| Population | 6439 | 3265 | 3174 |
| Children aged below 6 years | 812 | 428 | 384 |
| Scheduled caste | 300 | 143 | 157 |
| Scheduled tribe | 15 | 7 | 8 |
| Literates | 3662 | 2122 | 1540 |
| Illiterates | 2777 | 1143 | 1634 |
| Total Workers | 2497 | 1867 | 630 |
| Main workers | 2324 | 1793 | 531 |
| Main workers: Cultivators | 739 | 592 | 147 |
| Main workers: Agricultural labourers | 1192 | 841 | 351 |
| Main workers: Household industry workers | 15 | 13 | 2 |
| Main workers: Other | 378 | 347 | 31 |
| Marginal workers (total) | 173 | 74 | 99 |
| Marginal workers: Cultivators | 39 | 20 | 19 |
| Marginal workers: Agricultural labourers | 92 | 30 | 62 |
| Marginal workers: Household industry workers | 5 | 1 | 4 |
| Marginal workers: Others | 37 | 23 | 14 |
| Non-workers | 3942 | 1398 | 2544 |

== List of villages in Gir Gadhada Taluka ==
Below is the Revenue records list of forty-three villages of Gir Gadhada Taluka including Gir Gadhada village.

1. Ambavad
2. Ankolali
3. Babariya
4. Bediya
5. Bhakha
6. Bhiyal
7. Bodidar
8. Dhokadva
9. Dhrabavad
10. Dron
11. Fareda
12. Fatsar
13. Fulka
14. Gir Gadhada
15. Harmadiya
16. Itvaya
17. Jamvala
18. Jaragli
19. Jhanjhariya
20. Jhudvadli
21. Juna Ugla
22. Kanakiya
23. Kaneri
24. Kansariya
25. Khilavad
26. Kodiya
27. Mahobatpara
28. Motisar
29. Nagadiya
30. Nava Ugla
31. Nitli
32. Panderi
33. Rasulpara
34. Sanosri
35. Sanvav
36. Sonariya
37. Sonpura
38. Thordi
39. Umedpara
40. Undari
41. Vadli
42. Vadviyala
43. Velakot
