= Undari =

- Village
- Location in Gujarat, India Undari (India)
- Coordinates: 20.851433°N 70.959487°E
- Country: India
- State: Gujarat
- District: Gir Somnath
- Taluka: Gir Gadhada

Government
  - Type: Panchayati raj (India)
  - Body: Gram panchayat

Area
  - Total: 673.92 ha (1,665.3 acres)

Population (2011)
  - Total: 1,575
  - Density: 233.7/km^{2} (605.3/sq mi)
- Sex ratio 837/738♂/♀

Languages
  - Official: Gujarati
- Time zone: UTC+5:30 (IST)
- PIN: 362560
- Vehicle registration: GJ
- Census code of Undari: 515299
- Nearest city: Gir Gadhada, Una
- Website: girsomnathdp.gujarat.gov.in

Undari is a village / panchayat located in the Gir Gadhada Taluka of Gir Somnath district in Gujarat, India. Earlier, until August 2013, Undari was part of Una Taluka and Junagadh district. The latitude 20.851433 and longitude 70.959487 are the geo-coordinate of the Village Undari. Gandhinagar is the state capital of Undari village which is located around 400 kilometres away from Undari.

According to Census 2011, with the 252 families, the population of this village is 1575. Out of this, 837 are males and 738 are females. Most residents are dependent on agriculture.

== Demographics ==
According to the 2011 census of India, Undari has 252 households. The effective literacy rate (i.e. the literacy rate of population excluding children aged 6 and below) is 46.95%

Demographics (2011 Census)
	Total	Male	Female
Population	1575	837	738
Children aged below 6 years	282	157	125
Scheduled caste	2	2	-
Scheduled tribe	-	-	-
Literates	607	414	193
Illiterates	968	423	545
Total Workers	604	456	148
Main workers	597	451	146
Main workers: Cultivators	164	128	36
Main workers: Agricultural labourers	362	258	104
Main workers: Household industry workers	1	1	-
Main workers: Other	70	64	6
Marginal workers (total)	7	5	2
Marginal workers: Cultivators	3	3	-
Marginal workers: Agricultural labourers	-	-	-
Marginal workers: Household industry workers	-	-	-
Marginal workers: Others	4	2	2
Non-workers	971	381	590

== List of villages in Gir Gadhada Taluka ==
Below is the Revenue records list of forty-three villages of Gir Gadhada Taluka including Gir Gadhada village.

1. Ambavad
2. Ankolali
3. Babariya
4. Bediya
5. Bhakha
6. Bhiyal
7. Bodidar
8. Dhokadva
9. Dhrabavad
10. Dron
11. Fareda
12. Fatsar
13. Fulka
14. Gir Gadhada
15. Harmadiya
16. Itvaya
17. Jamvala
18. Jaragli
19. Jhanjhariya
20. Jhudvadli
21. Juna Ugla
22. Kanakiya
23. Kaneri
24. Kansariya
25. Khilavad
26. Kodiya
27. Mahobatpara
28. Motisar
29. Nagadiya
30. Nava Ugla
31. Nitli
32. Panderi
33. Rasulpara
34. Sanosri
35. Sanvav
36. Sonariya
37. Sonpura
38. Thordi
39. Umedpara
40. Undari
41. Vadli
42. Vadviyala
43. Velakot
