= Fareda =

- Village
- Location in Gujarat, India Fareda (India)
- Coordinates: 20.938265°N 70.900065°E
- Country: India
- State: Gujarat
- District: Gir Somnath
- Taluka: Gir Gadhada

Government
  - Type: Panchayati raj (India)
  - Body: Gram panchayat

Area
  - Total: 517.41 ha (1,278.5 acres)

Population (2011)
  - Total: 1,312
  - Density: 253.6/km^{2} (656.7/sq mi)
- Sex ratio 695/617♂/♀

Languages
  - Official: Gujarati
- Time zone: UTC+5:30 (IST)
- PIN: 362530
- Vehicle registration: GJ
- Census code of Fareda: 515254
- Nearest city: Gir Gadhada, Una
- Website: girsomnathdp.gujarat.gov.in

Fareda is a village / panchayat located in the Gir Gadhada Taluka of Gir Somnath district in Gujarat State, India. Earlier, until August 2013, Fareda was part of Una Taluka and Junagadh district. The latitude 20.938265 and longitude 70.900065 are the geo-coordinate of the Village Fareda. Gandhinagar is the state capital of Fareda village which is located around 375 kilometres away from Fareda.

According to Census 2011, with the 231 families, the population of this village is 1312. Out of this, 695 are males and 617 are females. Most residents are dependent on agriculture.

== Demographics ==
According to the 2011 census of India, Fareda has 231 households. The effective literacy rate (i.e. the literacy rate of population excluding children aged 6 and below) is 68.58%

Demographics (2011 Census)
	Total	Male	Female
Population	1312	695	617
Children aged below 6 years	179	104	75
Scheduled caste	4	1	3
Scheduled tribe	-	-	-
Literates	777	476	301
Illiterates	535	219	316
Total Workers	578	387	191
Main workers	450	372	78
Main workers: Cultivators	181	162	19
Main workers: Agricultural labourers	128	79	49
Main workers: Household industry workers	-	-	-
Main workers: Other	141	131	10
Marginal workers (total)	128	15	113
Marginal workers: Cultivators	100	11	89
Marginal workers: Agricultural labourers	16	3	13
Marginal workers: Household industry workers	-	-	-
Marginal workers: Others	12	1	11
Non-workers	734	308	426

== List of Villages in Gir Gadhada Taluka ==
Below is the Revenue records list of forty-three villages of Gir Gadhada Taluka including Gir Gadhada village.

1. Ambavad
2. Ankolali
3. Babariya
4. Bediya
5. Bhakha
6. Bhiyal
7. Bodidar
8. Dhokadva
9. Dhrabavad
10. Dron
11. Fareda
12. Fatsar
13. Fulka
14. Gir Gadhada
15. Harmadiya
16. Itvaya
17. Jamvala
18. Jaragli
19. Jhanjhariya
20. Jhudvadli
21. Juna Ugla
22. Kanakiya
23. Kaneri
24. Kansariya
25. Khilavad
26. Kodiya
27. Mahobatpara
28. Motisar
29. Nagadiya
30. Nava Ugla
31. Nitli
32. Panderi
33. Rasulpara
34. Sanosri
35. Sanvav
36. Sonariya
37. Sonpura
38. Thordi
39. Umedpara
40. Undari
41. Vadli
42. Vadviyala
43. Velakot
