= Sonpura =

- Village
- Location in Gujarat, India Sonpura (India)
- Coordinates: 20.859249°N 70.842121°E
- Country: India
- State: Gujarat
- District: Gir Somnath
- Taluka: Gir Gadhada

Government
  - Type: Panchayati raj (India)
  - Body: Gram panchayat

Area
  - Total: 441.23 ha (1,090.3 acres)

Population (2011)
  - Total: 3,060
  - Density: 694/km^{2} (1,800/sq mi)
- Sex ratio 1553/1507♂/♀

Languages
  - Official: Gujarati
- Time zone: UTC+5:30 (IST)
- PIN: 362560
- Vehicle registration: GJ
- Census code of Sonpura: 515294
- Nearest city: Gir Gadhada, Una
- Website: girsomnathdp.gujarat.gov.in

Sonpura is a village / panchayat located in the Gir Gadhada Taluka of Gir Somnath district in Gujarat State, India. Earlier, until August 2013, Sonpura was part of Una Taluka and Junagadh district. The latitude 20.859249 and longitude 70.842121 are the geo-coordinate of the Village Sonpura. Gandhinagar is the state capital of Sonpura village which is located around 400 kilometres away from Sonpura.

According to Census 2011, with the 505 families, the population of this village is 3060. Out of this, 1553 are males and 1507 are females. Most residents are dependent on agriculture.

== Demographics ==
According to the 2011 census of India, Sonpura has 505 households. The effective literacy rate (i.e. the literacy rate of population excluding children aged 6 and below) is 68.42%

Demographics (2011 Census)
	Total	Male	Female
Population	3060	1553	1507
Children aged below 6 years	372	193	179
Scheduled caste	147	73	74
Scheduled tribe	3	2	1
Literates	1839	1063	776
Illiterates	1221	490	731
Total Workers	1599	861	738
Main workers	1281	848	433
Main workers: Cultivators	528	388	140
Main workers: Agricultural labourers	662	387	275
Main workers: Household industry workers	-	-	-
Main workers: Other	91	73	18
Marginal workers (total)	318	13	305
Marginal workers: Cultivators	234	7	227
Marginal workers: Agricultural labourers	76	2	74
Marginal workers: Household industry workers	1	1	-
Marginal workers: Others	7	3	4
Non-workers	1461	692	769

== List of villages in Gir Gadhada Taluka ==
Below is the Revenue records list of forty-three villages of Gir Gadhada Taluka including Gir Gadhada village.

1. Ambavad
2. Ankolali
3. Babariya
4. Bediya
5. Bhakha
6. Bhiyal
7. Bodidar
8. Dhokadva
9. Dhrabavad
10. Dron
11. Fareda
12. Fatsar
13. Fulka
14. Gir Gadhada
15. Harmadiya
16. Itvaya
17. Jamvala
18. Jaragli
19. Jhanjhariya
20. Jhudvadli
21. Juna Ugla
22. Kanakiya
23. Kaneri
24. Kansariya
25. Khilavad
26. Kodiya
27. Mahobatpara
28. Motisar
29. Nagadiya
30. Nava Ugla
31. Nitli
32. Panderi
33. Rasulpara
34. Sanosri
35. Sanvav
36. Sonariya
37. Sonpura
38. Thordi
39. Umedpara
40. Undari
41. Vadli
42. Vadviyala
43. Velakot
