= Dron (Gir Gadhada) =

- Village
- Location in Gujarat, India Dron (India)
- Coordinates: 20.928161°N 70.949985°E
- Country: India
- State: Gujarat
- District: Gir Somnath
- Taluka: Gir Gadhada

Government
  - Type: Panchayati raj (India)
  - Body: Gram panchayat

Area
  - Total: 1,341.78 ha (3,315.6 acres)

Population (2011)
  - Total: 2,892
  - Density: 215.5/km^{2} (558.2/sq mi)
- Sex ratio 1485/1407♂/♀

Languages
  - Official: Gujarati
- Time zone: UTC+5:30 (IST)
- PIN: 362530
- Vehicle registration: GJ
- Census code of Dron: 515256
- Nearest city: Gir Gadhada, Una
- Website: girsomnathdp.gujarat.gov.in

Dron is a village / panchayat, located in the Gir Gadhada Taluka of Gir Somnath district in Gujarat State, India. Earlier, until August 2013, Dron was part of Una Taluka and Junagadh district. The latitude 20.928161 and longitude 70.949985 are the geo-coordinate of the Village Dron. Gandhinagar is the state capital of Dron village which is located around 362 kilometres away from Dron.

According to Census 2011, with the 510 families, the population of this village is 2892. Out of this, 1485 are males and 1407 are females. Most residents are dependent on agriculture.

== Demographics ==
According to the 2011 census of India, Dron has 510 households. The effective literacy rate (i.e. the literacy rate of population excluding children aged 6 and below) is 67.86%

Demographics (2011 Census)
	Total	Male	Female
Population	2892	1485	1407
Children aged below 6 years	369	193	176
Scheduled caste	35	23	12
Scheduled tribe	129	80	49
Literates	1712	1015	697
Illiterates	1180	470	710
Total Workers	1642	932	710
Main workers	1311	926	385
Main workers: Cultivators	343	272	71
Main workers: Agricultural labourers	805	502	303
Main workers: Household industry workers	26	25	1
Main workers: Other	137	127	10
Marginal workers (total)	331	6	325
Marginal workers: Cultivators	40	1	39
Marginal workers: Agricultural labourers	283	4	279
Marginal workers: Household industry workers	2	1	1
Marginal workers: Others	6	-	6
Non-workers	1250	553	697

== List of Villages in Gir Gadhada Taluka ==
Below is the Revenue records list of forty-three villages of Gir Gadhada Taluka including Gir Gadhada village.

1. Ambavad
2. Ankolali
3. Babariya
4. Bediya
5. Bhakha
6. Bhiyal
7. Bodidar
8. Dhokadva
9. Dhrabavad
10. Dron gir
11. Fareda
12. Fatsar
13. Fulka
14. Gir Gadhada
15. Harmadiya
16. Itvaya
17. Jamvala
18. Jaragli
19. Jhanjhariya
20. Jhudvadli
21. Juna Ugla
22. Kanakiya
23. Kaneri
24. Kansariya
25. Khilavad
26. Kodiya
27. Mahobatpara
28. Motisar
29. Nagadiya
30. Nava Ugla
31. Nitli
32. Panderi
33. Rasulpara
34. Sanosri
35. Sanvav
36. Sonariya
37. Sonpura
38. Thordi
39. Umedpara
40. Undari
41. Vadli
42. Vadviyala
43. Velakot
