= Nagadiya =

- Village
- Location in Gujarat, India Nagadiya (India)
- Coordinates: 20.972363°N 71.057422°E
- Country: India
- State: Gujarat
- District: Gir Somnath
- Taluka: Gir Gadhada

Government
  - Type: Panchayati raj (India)
  - Body: Gram panchayat

Area
  - Total: 630.55 ha (1,558.1 acres)

Population (2011)
  - Total: 1,316
  - Density: 208.7/km^{2} (540.5/sq mi)
- Sex ratio 645/671♂/♀

Languages
  - Official: Gujarati
- Time zone: UTC+5:30 (IST)
- PIN: 362565
- Vehicle registration: GJ
- Census code of Nagadiya: 515247
- Nearest city: Gir Gadhada, Una
- Website: girsomnathdp.gujarat.gov.in

Nagadiya is a village / panchayat located in the Gir Gadhada Taluka of Gir Somnath district in Gujarat, India. Earlier, until August 2013, Nagadiya was part of Una Taluka and Junagadh district. The latitude 20.972363 and longitude 71.057422 are the geo-coordinate of the Village Nagadiya. Gandhinagar is the state capital of Nagadiya village which is located around 350 kilometres away from Nagadiya.

According to Census 2011, with the 212 families, the population of this village is 1316. Out of this, 645 are males and 671 are females. Most residents are dependent on agriculture.

== Demographics ==
According to the 2011 census of India, Nagadiya has 212 households. The effective literacy rate (i.e. the literacy rate of population excluding children aged 6 and below) is 69.94%

Demographics (2011 Census)
	Total	Male	Female
Population	1316	645	671
Children aged below 6 years	175	90	85
Scheduled caste	26	13	13
Scheduled tribe	—	—	—
Literates	798	435	363
Illiterates	518	210	308
Total Workers	524	323	201
Main workers	504	319	185
Main workers: Cultivators	209	197	12
Main workers: Agricultural labourers	239	73	166
Main workers: Household industry workers	1	1	—
Main workers: Other	55	48	7
Marginal workers (total)	20	4	16
Marginal workers: Cultivators	1	—	1
Marginal workers: Agricultural labourers	17	2	15
Marginal workers: Household industry workers	—	—	—
Marginal workers: Others	2	2	—
Non-workers	792	322	470

== List of Villages in Gir Gadhada Taluka ==
Below is the Revenue records list of forty-three villages of Gir Gadhada Taluka including Gir Gadhada village.

1. Ambavad
2. Ankolali
3. Babariya
4. Bediya
5. Bhakha
6. Bhiyal
7. Bodidar
8. Dhokadva
9. Dhrabavad
10. Dron
11. Fareda
12. Fatsar
13. Fulka
14. Gir Gadhada
15. Harmadiya
16. Itvaya
17. Jamvala
18. Jaragli
19. Jhanjhariya
20. Jhudvadli
21. Juna Ugla
22. Kanakiya
23. Kaneri
24. Kansariya
25. Khilavad
26. Kodiya
27. Mahobatpara
28. Motisar
29. Nagadiya
30. Nava Ugla
31. Nitli
32. Panderi
33. Rasulpara
34. Sanosri
35. Sanvav
36. Sonariya
37. Sonpura
38. Thordi
39. Umedpara
40. Undari
41. Vadli
42. Vadviyala
43. Velakot
