= Motisar (Gir Gadhada) =

- Village
- Location in Gujarat, India Motisar (India)
- Coordinates: 20.986598°N 71.090746°E
- Country: India
- State: Gujarat
- District: Gir Somnath
- Taluka: Gir Gadhada

Government
  - Type: Panchayati raj (India)
  - Body: Gram panchayat

Area
  - Total: 495.89 ha (1,225.4 acres)

Population (2011)
  - Total: 1,645
  - Density: 331.7/km^{2} (859.2/sq mi)
- Sex ratio 829/816♂/♀

Languages
  - Official: Gujarati
- Time zone: UTC+5:30 (IST)
- PIN: 362530
- Vehicle registration: GJ
- Census code of Motisar: 515246
- Nearest city: Gir Gadhada, Una
- Website: girsomnathdp.gujarat.gov.in

Motisar is a village / panchayat located in the Gir Gadhada Taluka of Gir Somnath district in Gujarat State, India. Earlier, until August 2013, Motisar was part of Una Taluka and Junagadh district. The latitude 20.986598 and longitude 71.090746 are the geo-coordinate of the Village Motisar. Gandhinagar is the state capital of Motisar village which is located 350 kilometres away from Motisar.

According to Census 2011, with the 293 families, the population of this village is 1645. Out of this, 829 are males and 816 are females. Most residents are dependent on agriculture.

== Demographics ==
According to the 2011 census of India, Motisar has 293 households. The effective literacy rate (i.e. the literacy rate of population excluding children aged 6 and below) is 70.67%

Demographics (2011 Census)
	Total	Male	Female
Population	1645	829	816
Children aged below 6 years	179	76	103
Scheduled caste	163	78	85
Scheduled tribe	5	3	2
Literates	1036	617	419
Illiterates	609	212	397
Total Workers	773	545	228
Main workers	730	531	199
Main workers: Cultivators	221	197	24
Main workers: Agricultural labourers	404	251	153
Main workers: Household industry workers	21	17	4
Main workers: Other	84	66	18
Marginal workers (total)	43	14	29
Marginal workers: Cultivators	12	3	9
Marginal workers: Agricultural labourers	27	8	19
Marginal workers: Household industry workers	-	-	-
Marginal workers: Others	4	3	1
Non-workers	872	284	588

== List of villages in Gir Gadhada Taluka ==
Below is the Revenue records list of forty-three villages of Gir Gadhada Taluka including Gir Gadhada village.

1. Ambavad
2. Ankolali
3. Babariya
4. Bediya
5. Bhakha
6. Bhiyal
7. Bodidar
8. Dhokadva
9. Dhrabavad
10. Dron
11. Fareda
12. Fatsar
13. Fulka
14. Gir Gadhada
15. Harmadiya
16. Itvaya
17. Jamvala
18. Jaragli
19. Jhanjhariya
20. Jhudvadli
21. Juna Ugla
22. Kanakiya
23. Kaneri
24. Kansariya
25. Khilavad
26. Kodiya
27. Mahobatpara
28. Motisar
29. Nagadiya
30. Nava Ugla
31. Nitli
32. Panderi
33. Rasulpara
34. Sanosri
35. Sanvav
36. Sonariya
37. Sonpura
38. Thordi
39. Umedpara
40. Undari
41. Vadli
42. Vadviyala
43. Velakot
