= Jaragli =

Gir Jaragli Gir Jaragli
- Village
- Gir Jaragli
- Location in Gujarat, India Gir Jaragli (India)
- Coordinates: 20.889738°N 70.932895°E
- Country: India
- State: Gujarat
- District: Gir Somnath
- Taluka: Gir Gadhada

Government
  - Type: Panchayati raj (India)
  - Body: Gram panchayat

Area
  - Total: 1,017.55 ha (2,514.4 acres)

Population (2011)
  - Total: 3,358
  - Density: 330.0/km^{2} (854.7/sq mi)
- Sex ratio 1702/1656♂/♀

Languages
  - Official: Gujarati
- Time zone: UTC+5:30 (IST)
- PIN: 362530
- Vehicle registration: GJ
- Census code of Jaragli: 515270
- Nearest city: Gir Gadhada, Una
- Website: girsomnathdp.gujarat.gov.in

Jaragli is a village / panchayat located in the Gir Gadhada Taluka of Gir Somnath district in Gujarat, India. Earlier, until August 2013, Jaragli was part of Una Taluka and Junagadh district. The latitude 20.889738 and longitude 70.932895 are the geo-coordinate of the Village Jaragli. Gandhinagar is the state capital of Jaragli village which is located around 400 kilometres away from Jaragli.

According to Census 2011, with the 637 families, the population of this village is 3358. Out of this, 1702 are males and 1656 are females. Most residents are dependent on agriculture.

== Demographics ==
According to the 2011 census of India, Jaragli has 637 households. The effective literacy rate (i.e. the literacy rate of population excluding children aged 6 and below) is 73.74%

Demographics (2011 Census)
	Total	Male	Female
Population	3358	1702	1656
Children aged below 6 years	426	224	202
Scheduled caste	241	125	116
Scheduled tribe	-	-	-
Literates	2162	1270	892
Illiterates	1196	432	764
Total Workers	1301	976	325
Main workers	1124	954	170
Main workers: Cultivators	520	481	39
Main workers: Agricultural labourers	352	245	107
Main workers: Household industry workers	-	-	-
Main workers: Other	252	228	24
Marginal workers (total)	177	22	155
Marginal workers: Cultivators	39	5	34
Marginal workers: Agricultural labourers	134	13	121
Marginal workers: Household industry workers	-	-	-
Marginal workers: Others	4	4	-
Non-workers	2057	726	1331

== List of villages in Gir Gadhada Taluka ==
Below is the Revenue records list of forty-three villages of Gir Gadhada Taluka including Gir Gadhada village.

1. Ambavad
2. Ankolali
3. Babariya
4. Bediya
5. Bhakha
6. Bhiyal
7. Bodidar
8. Dhokadva
9. Dhrabavad
10. Dron
11. Fareda
12. Fatsar
13. Fulka
14. Gir Gadhada
15. Harmadiya
16. Itvaya
17. Jamvala
18. Jaragli
19. Jhanjhariya
20. Jhudvadli
21. Juna Ugla
22. Kanakiya
23. Kaneri
24. Kansariya
25. Khilavad
26. Kodiya
27. Mahobatpara
28. Motisar
29. Nagadiya
30. Nava Ugla
31. Nitli
32. Panderi
33. Rasulpara
34. Sanosri
35. Sanvav
36. Sonariya
37. Sonpura
38. Thordi
39. Umedpara
40. Undari
41. Vadli
42. Vadviyala
43. Velakot
