= Jhudvadli =

- Village
- Location in Gujarat, India Jhudvadli (India)
- Coordinates: 20.889838°N 70.992009°E
- Country: India
- State: Gujarat
- District: Gir Somnath
- Taluka: Gir Gadhada

Government
  - Type: Panchayati raj (India)
  - Body: Gram panchayat

Area
  - Total: 649.97 ha (1,606.1 acres)

Population (2011)
  - Total: 1,801
  - Density: 277.1/km^{2} (717.7/sq mi)
- Sex ratio 896/905♂/♀

Languages
  - Official: Gujarati
- Time zone: UTC+5:30 (IST)
- PIN: 362560
- Vehicle registration: GJ
- Census code of Jhudvadli: 515272
- Nearest city: Gir Gadhada, Una
- Website: girsomnathdp.gujarat.gov.in

Jhudvadli is a village / panchayat located in the Gir Gadhada Taluka of Gir Somnath district in Gujarat, India. Earlier, until August 2013, Jhudvadli was part of Una Taluka and Junagadh district. The latitude 20.889838 and longitude 70.992009 are the geo-coordinate of the Village Jhudvadli. Gandhinagar is the state capital of Jhudvadli village which is located around 400 kilometres away from Jhudvadli.

According to Census 2011, with the 357 families, the population of this village is 1801. Out of this, 896 are males and 905 are females. Most residents are dependent on agriculture.

== Demographics ==
According to the 2011 census of India, Jhudvadli has 357 households. The effective literacy rate (i.e. the literacy rate of population excluding children aged 6 and below) is 75.77%

Demographics (2011 Census)
	Total	Male	Female
Population	1801	896	905
Children aged below 6 years	212	100	112
Scheduled caste	372	192	180
Scheduled tribe	-	-	-
Literates	1204	699	505
Illiterates	597	197	400
Total Workers	885	553	332
Main workers	529	477	52
Main workers: Cultivators	205	200	5
Main workers: Agricultural labourers	246	211	35
Main workers: Household industry workers	-	-	-
Main workers: Other	78	66	12
Marginal workers (total)	356	76	280
Marginal workers: Cultivators	48	3	45
Marginal workers: Agricultural labourers	292	66	226
Marginal workers: Household industry workers	1	-	1
Marginal workers: Others	15	7	8
Non-workers	916	343	573

== List of villages in Gir Gadhada Taluka ==
Below is the Revenue records list of forty-three villages of Gir Gadhada Taluka including Gir Gadhada village.

1. Ambavad
2. Ankolali
3. Babariya
4. Bediya
5. Bhakha
6. Bhiyal
7. Bodidar
8. Dhokadva
9. Dhrabavad
10. Dron
11. Fareda
12. Fatsar
13. Fulka
14. Gir Gadhada
15. Harmadiya
16. Itvaya
17. Jamvala
18. Jaragli
19. Jhanjhariya
20. Jhudvadli
21. Juna Ugla
22. Kanakiya
23. Kaneri
24. Kansariya
25. Khilavad
26. Kodiya
27. Mahobatpara
28. Motisar
29. Nagadiya
30. Nava Ugla
31. Nitli
32. Panderi
33. Rasulpara
34. Sanosri
35. Sanvav
36. Sonariya
37. Sonpura
38. Thordi
39. Umedpara
40. Undari
41. Vadli
42. Vadviyala
43. Velakot
