= Velakot =

- Village
- Location in Gujarat, India Velakot (India)
- Coordinates: 20.873284°N 70.884042°E
- Country: India
- State: Gujarat
- District: Gir Somnath
- Taluka: Gir Gadhada

Government
  - Type: Panchayati raj (India)
  - Body: Gram panchayat

Area
  - Total: 472.69 ha (1,168.0 acres)

Population (2011)
  - Total: 1,937
  - Density: 409.8/km^{2} (1,061/sq mi)
- Sex ratio 984/953♂/♀

Languages
  - Official: Gujarati
- Time zone: UTC+5:30 (IST)
- PIN: 362560
- Vehicle registration: GJ
- Census code of Velakot: 515292
- Nearest city: Gir Gadhada, Una
- Website: girsomnathdp.gujarat.gov.in

Velakot is a village / panchayat located in the Gir Gadhada Taluka of Gir Somnath district in Gujarat State, India. Earlier, until August 2013, Velakot was part of Una Taluka and Junagadh district. The latitude 20.873284 and longitude 70.884042 are the geo-coordinate of the Village Velakot. Gandhinagar is the state capital of Velakot village which is located around 400 kilometres away from Velakot.

According to Census 2011, with the 329 families, the population of this village is 1937. Out of this, 984 are males and 953 are females. Most residents are dependent on agriculture.

== Demographics ==
According to the 2011 census of India, Velakot has 329 households. The effective literacy rate (i.e. the literacy rate of population excluding children aged 6 and below) is 62.53%

Demographics (2011 Census)
	Total	Male	Female
Population	1937	984	953
Children aged below 6 years	301	155	146
Scheduled caste	-	-	-
Scheduled tribe	-	-	-
Literates	1023	608	415
Illiterates	914	376	538
Total Workers	1063	546	517
Main workers	560	535	25
Main workers: Cultivators	150	145	5
Main workers: Agricultural labourers	383	368	15
Main workers: Household industry workers	3	3	-
Main workers: Other	24	19	5
Marginal workers (total)	503	11	492
Marginal workers: Cultivators	4	1	3
Marginal workers: Agricultural labourers	499	10	489
Marginal workers: Household industry workers	-	-	-
Marginal workers: Others	-	-	-
Non-workers	874	438	436

== List of villages in Gir Gadhada Taluka ==
Below is the Revenue records list of forty-three villages of Gir Gadhada Taluka including Gir Gadhada village.

1. Ambavad
2. Ankolali
3. Babariya
4. Bediya
5. Bhakha
6. Bhiyal
7. Bodidar
8. Dhokadva
9. Dhrabavad
10. Dron
11. Fareda
12. Fatsar
13. Fulka
14. Gir Gadhada
15. Harmadiya
16. Itvaya
17. Jamvala
18. Jaragli
19. Jhanjhariya
20. Jhudvadli
21. Juna Ugla
22. Kanakiya
23. Kaneri
24. Kansariya
25. Khilavad
26. Kodiya
27. Mahobatpara
28. Motisar
29. Nagadiya
30. Nava Ugla
31. Nitli
32. Panderi
33. Rasulpara
34. Sanosri
35. Sanvav
36. Sonariya
37. Sonpura
38. Thordi
39. Umedpara
40. Undari
41. Vadli
42. Vadviyala
43. Velakot
