= Babariya (Gir Gadhada) =

- Village
- Location in Gujarat, India Babariya (India)
- Coordinates: 20.97097°N 70.867234°E
- Country: India
- State: Gujarat
- District: Gir Somnath
- Taluka: Gir Gadhada

Government
  - Type: Panchayati raj (India)
  - Body: Gram panchayat

Area
  - Total: 308.87 ha (763.2 acres)

Population (2011)
  - Total: 429
  - Density: 139/km^{2} (360/sq mi)
- Sex ratio 223/206♂/♀

Languages
  - Official: Gujarati
- Time zone: UTC+5:30 (IST)
- PIN: 362530
- Vehicle registration: GJ
- Census code of Babariya: 515252
- Nearest city: Gir Gadhada, Una
- Website: girsomnathdp.gujarat.gov.in

Babariya is a village / panchayat located in the Gir Gadhada Taluka of Gir Somnath district in Gujarat State, India. Earlier, until August 2013, Babariya was part of Una Taluka and Junagadh district. The latitude 20.97097 and longitude 70.867234 are the geo-coordinate of the Village Babariya. Gandhinagar is the state capital of Babariya village which is located around 375 kilometres away from Babariya.

According to Census 2011, with the 88 families, the population of this village is 429. Out of this, 223 are males and 206 are females. Most residents are dependent on agriculture.

== Demographics ==
According to the 2011 census of India, Babariya has 88 households. The effective literacy rate (i.e. the literacy rate of population excluding children aged 6 and below) is 68.68%

Demographics (2011 Census)
	Total	Male	Female
Population	429	223	206
Children aged below 6 years	65	34	31
Scheduled caste	5	2	3
Scheduled tribe	57	35	22
Literates	250	154	96
Illiterates	179	69	110
Total Workers	213	138	75
Main workers	213	138	75
Main workers: Cultivators	77	51	26
Main workers: Agricultural labourers	78	36	42
Main workers: Household industry workers	-	-	-
Main workers: Other	58	51	7
Marginal workers (total)	-	-	-
Marginal workers: Cultivators	-	-	-
Marginal workers: Agricultural labourers	-	-	-
Marginal workers: Household industry workers	-	-	-
Marginal workers: Others	-	-	-
Non-workers	216	85	131

== List of villages in Gir Gadhada Taluka ==
Below is the Revenue records list of forty-three villages of Gir Gadhada Taluka including Gir Gadhada village.

1. Ambavad
2. Ankolali
3. Babariya
4. Bediya
5. Bhakha
6. Bhiyal
7. Bodidar
8. Dhokadva
9. Dhrabavad
10. Dron
11. Fareda
12. Fatsar
13. Fulka
14. Gir Gadhada
15. Harmadiya
16. Itvaya
17. Jamvala
18. Jaragli
19. Jhanjhariya
20. Jhudvadli
21. Juna Ugla
22. Kanakiya
23. Kaneri
24. Kansariya
25. Khilavad
26. Kodiya
27. Mahobatpara
28. Motisar
29. Nagadiya
30. Nava Ugla
31. Nitli
32. Panderi
33. Rasulpara
34. Sanosri
35. Sanvav
36. Sonariya
37. Sonpura
38. Thordi
39. Umedpara
40. Undari
41. Vadli
42. Vadviyala
43. Velakot
