= Dhrabavad =

- Village
- Location in Gujarat, India Dhrabavad (India)
- Coordinates: 20.862503°N 70.904944°E
- Country: India
- State: Gujarat
- District: Gir Somnath
- Taluka: Gir Gadhada

Government
  - Type: Panchayati raj (India)
  - Body: Gram panchayat

Area
  - Total: 490.17 ha (1,211.2 acres)

Population (2011)
  - Total: 482
  - Density: 98.3/km^{2} (255/sq mi)
- Sex ratio 248/234♂/♀

Languages
  - Official: Gujarati
- Time zone: UTC+5:30 (IST)
- PIN: 362560
- Vehicle registration: GJ
- Census code of Dhrabavad: 515291
- Nearest city: Gir Gadhada, Una
- Website: girsomnathdp.gujarat.gov.in

Dhrabavad, also spelled as Dhabavad, is a village / panchayat located in the Gir Gadhada Taluka of Gir Somnath district in Gujarat State, India. Earlier, until August 2013, Dhrabavad was part of Una Taluka and Junagadh district. The latitude 20.862503 and longitude 70.904944 are the geo-coordinate of the Village Dhrabavad. Gandhinagar is the state capital of Dhrabavad village which is located around 400 kilometres away from Dhrabavad.

According to Census 2011, with the 99 families, the population of this village is 482. Out of this, 248 are males and 234 are females. Most residents are dependent on agriculture.

== Demographics ==
According to the 2011 census of India, Dhrabavad has 99 households. The effective literacy rate (i.e. the literacy rate of population excluding children aged 6 and below) is 75.97%

Demographics (2011 Census)
	Total	Male	Female
Population	482	248	234
Children aged below 6 years	45	24	21
Scheduled caste	49	22	27
Scheduled tribe	-	-	-
Literates	332	188	144
Illiterates	150	60	90
Total Workers	181	164	17
Main workers	176	163	13
Main workers: Cultivators	125	124	1
Main workers: Agricultural labourers	13	6	7
Main workers: Household industry workers	2	2	-
Main workers: Other	36	31	5
Marginal workers (total)	5	1	4
Marginal workers: Cultivators	-	-	-
Marginal workers: Agricultural labourers	3	-	3
Marginal workers: Household industry workers	-	-	-
Marginal workers: Others	2	1	1
Non-workers	301	84	217

== List of villages in Gir Gadhada Taluka ==
Below is the Revenue records list of forty-three villages of Gir Gadhada Taluka including Gir Gadhada village.

1. Ambavad
2. Ankolali
3. Babariya
4. Bediya
5. Bhakha
6. Bhiyal
7. Bodidar
8. Dhokadva
9. Dhrabavad
10. Dron
11. Fareda
12. Fatsar
13. Fulka
14. Gir Gadhada
15. Harmadiya
16. Itvaya
17. Jamvala
18. Jaragli
19. Jhanjhariya
20. Jhudvadli
21. Juna Ugla
22. Kanakiya
23. Kaneri
24. Kansariya
25. Khilavad
26. Kodiya
27. Mahobatpara
28. Motisar
29. Nagadiya
30. Nava Ugla
31. Nitli
32. Panderi
33. Rasulpara
34. Sanosri
35. Sanvav
36. Sonariya
37. Sonpura
38. Thordi
39. Umedpara
40. Undari
41. Vadli
42. Vadviyala
43. Velakot
