= Itvaya =

- Village
- Location in Gujarat, India Itvaya (India)
- Coordinates: 20.95438°N 70.976896°E
- Country: India
- State: Gujarat
- District: Gir Somnath
- Taluka: Gir Gadhada

Government
  - Type: Panchayati raj (India)
  - Body: Gram panchayat

Area
  - Total: 1,457.06 ha (3,600.5 acres)

Population (2011)
  - Total: 1,902
  - Density: 130.5/km^{2} (338.1/sq mi)
- Sex ratio 956/946♂/♀

Languages
  - Official: Gujarati
- Time zone: UTC+5:30 (IST)
- PIN: 362530
- Vehicle registration: GJ
- Census code of Itvaya: 515257
- Nearest city: Gir Gadhada, Una
- Website: girsomnathdp.gujarat.gov.in

Itvaya is a village / panchayat located in the Gir Gadhada Taluka of Gir Somnath district in Gujarat State, India. Until August 2013 Itvaya was part of Una Taluka and Junagadh district.

According to the 2011 census the population was 1902, in 384 families, of whom 956 are male and 946 are female. Most residents are dependent on agriculture.

== Demographics ==
According to the 2011 census of India, Itvaya has 384 households. The effective literacy rate (i.e. the literacy rate of population excluding children aged 6 and below) is 66.45%

Demographics (2011 Census)
	Total	Male	Female
Population	1902	956	946
Children aged below 6 years	215	125	90
Scheduled caste	384	198	186
Scheduled tribe	3	1	2
Literates	1121	630	491
Illiterates	781	326	455
Total Workers	980	566	414
Main workers	972	561	411
Main workers: Cultivators	395	238	157
Main workers: Agricultural labourers	481	240	241
Main workers: Household industry workers	-	-	-
Main workers: Other	96	83	13
Marginal workers (total)	8	5	3
Marginal workers: Cultivators	-	-	-
Marginal workers: Agricultural labourers	2	1	1
Marginal workers: Household industry workers	-	-	-
Marginal workers: Others	6	4	2
Non-workers	922	390	532

== List of villages in Gir Gadhada Taluka ==
Below is the Revenue records list of forty-three villages of Gir Gadhada Taluka including Gir Gadhada village.

1. Ambavad
2. Ankolali
3. Babariya
4. Bediya
5. Bhakha
6. Bhiyal
7. Bodidar
8. Dhokadva
9. Dhrabavad
10. Dron
11. Fareda
12. Fatsar
13. Fulka
14. Gir Gadhada
15. Harmadiya
16. Itvaya
17. Jamvala
18. Jaragli
19. Jhanjhariya
20. Jhudvadli
21. Juna Ugla
22. Kanakiya
23. Kaneri
24. Kansariya
25. Khilavad
26. Kodiya
27. Mahobatpara
28. Motisar
29. Nagadiya
30. Nava Ugla
31. Nitli
32. Panderi
33. Rasulpara
34. Sanosri
35. Sanvav
36. Sonariya
37. Sonpura
38. Thordi
39. Umedpara
40. Undari
41. Vadli
42. Vadviyala
43. Velakot
