= Mahobatpara =

- Village
- Location in Gujarat, India Mahobatpara (India)
- Coordinates: 20.931475°N 71.082764°E
- Country: India
- State: Gujarat
- District: Gir Somnath
- Taluka: Gir Gadhada

Government
  - Type: Panchayati raj (India)
  - Body: Gram panchayat Sarpach of Panchayat. = Lalji katariya

Area
  - Total: 594.49 ha (1,469.0 acres)

Population (2011)
  - Total: 1,613
  - Density: 271.3/km^{2} (702.7/sq mi)
- Sex ratio 790/823♂/♀

Languages
  - Official: Gujarati
- Time zone: UTC+5:30 (IST)
- PIN: 362565
- Vehicle registration: GJ
- Census code of Mahobatpara: 515263
- Nearest city: Gir Gadhada, Una
- Website: girsomnathdp.gujarat.gov.in

Mahobatpara is a village / panchayat located in the Gir Gadhada Taluka of Gir Somnath district in Gujarat State, India. Earlier, until August 2013, Mahobatpara was part of Una Taluka and Junagadh district. The latitude 20.931475 and longitude 71.082764 are the geo-coordinate of the Village Mahobatpara. Gandhinagar is the state capital of Mahobatpara village which is located around 350 kilometres away from Mahobatpara.

According to Census 2011, with the 241 families, the population of this village is 1613. Out of this, 790 are males and 823 are females. Most residents are dependent on agriculture.

== Demographics ==
According to the 2011 census of India, Mahobatpara has 241 households. The effective literacy rate (i.e. the literacy rate of population excluding children aged 6 and below) is 68.37%

Demographics (2011 Census)
	Total	Male	Female
Population	1613	790	823
Children aged below 6 years	241	130	111
Scheduled caste	44	23	21
Scheduled tribe	-	-	-
Literates	938	539	399
Illiterates	675	251	424
Total Workers	646	402	244
Main workers	636	396	240
Main workers: Cultivators	339	202	137
Main workers: Agricultural labourers	180	93	87
Main workers: Household industry workers	2	1	1
Main workers: Other	115	100	15
Marginal workers (total)	10	6	4
Marginal workers: Cultivators	3	-	3
Marginal workers: Agricultural labourers	-	-	-
Marginal workers: Household industry workers	-	-	-
Marginal workers: Others	7	6	1
Non-workers	967	388	579

== List of Villages in Gir Gadhada Taluka ==
Below is the Revenue records list of forty-three villages of Gir Gadhada Taluka including Gir Gadhada village.

1. Ambavad
2. Ankolali
3. Babariya
4. Bediya
5. Bhakha
6. Bhiyal
7. Bodidar
8. Dhokadva
9. Dhrabavad
10. Dron
11. Fareda
12. Fatsar
13. Fulka
14. Gir Gadhada
15. Harmadiya
16. Itvaya
17. Jamvala
18. Jaragli
19. Jhanjhariya
20. Jhudvadli
21. Juna Ugla
22. Kanakiya
23. Kaneri
24. Kansariya
25. Khilavad
26. Kodiya
27. Mahobatpara
28. Motisar
29. Nagadiya
30. Nava Ugla
31. Nitli
32. Panderi
33. Rasulpara
34. Sanosri
35. Sanvav
36. Sonariya
37. Sonpura
38. Thordi
39. Umedpara
40. Undari
41. Vadli
42. Vadviyala
43. Velakot
