= Dhokadva =

- Village
- Location in Gujarat, India Dhokadva (India)
- Coordinates: 20.951801°N 71.072391°E
- Country: India
- State: Gujarat
- District: Gir Somnath
- Taluka: Gir Gadhada

Government
  - Type: Panchayati raj (India)
  - Body: Gram panchayat

Area
  - Total: 1,177.67 ha (2,910.1 acres)

Population (2011)
  - Total: 6,980
  - Density: 593/km^{2} (1,540/sq mi)
- Sex ratio 3554/3426♂/♀

Languages
  - Official: Gujarati
- Time zone: UTC+5:30 (IST)
- PIN: 362565
- Vehicle registration: GJ
- Census code of Dhokadva: 515259
- Nearest city: Gir Gadhada, Una
- Website: girsomnathdp.gujarat.gov.in

Dhokadva is a village / panchayat located in the Gir Gadhada Taluka of Gir Somnath district in Gujarat State, India. Earlier, until August 2013, Dhokadva was part of Una Taluka and Junagadh district. The latitude 20.951801 and longitude 71.072391 are the geo-coordinate of the Village Dhokadva. Gandhinagar is the state capital of Dhokadva village which is located around 350 kilometres away from Dhokadva.

According to Census 2011, with the 1236 families, the population of this village is 6980. Out of this, 3554 are males and 3426 are females. Most residents are dependent on agriculture.

== Demographics ==
According to the 2011 census of India, Dhokadva has 1236 households. The effective literacy rate (i.e. the literacy rate of population excluding children aged 6 and below) is 67.49%

Demographics (2011 Census)
	Total	Male	Female
Population	6980	3554	3426
Children aged below 6 years	881	472	409
Scheduled caste	576	291	285
Scheduled tribe	35	19	16
Literates	4116	2383	1733
Illiterates	2864	1171	1693
Total Workers	2969	1957	1012
Main workers	2614	1897	717
Main workers: Cultivators	832	718	114
Main workers: Agricultural labourers	1081	545	536
Main workers: Household industry workers	13	13	-
Main workers: Other	688	621	67
Marginal workers (total)	355	60	295
Marginal workers: Cultivators	170	11	159
Marginal workers: Agricultural labourers	141	39	102
Marginal workers: Household industry workers	1	1	-
Marginal workers: Others	43	9	34
Non-workers	4011	1597	2414

== List of Villages in Gir Gadhada Taluka ==
Below is the Revenue records list of forty-three villages of Gir Gadhada Taluka including Gir Gadhada village.

1. Ambavad
2. Ankolali
3. Babariya
4. Bediya
5. Bhakha
6. Bhiyal
7. Bodidar
8. Dhokadva
9. Dhrabavad
10. Dron
11. Fareda
12. Fatsar
13. Fulka
14. Gir Gadhada
15. Harmadiya
16. Itvaya
17. Jamvala
18. Jaragli
19. Jhanjhariya
20. Jhudvadli
21. Juna Ugla
22. Kanakiya
23. Kaneri
24. Kansariya
25. Khilavad
26. Kodiya
27. Mahobatpara
28. Motisar
29. Nagadiya
30. Nava Ugla
31. Nitli
32. Panderi
33. Rasulpara
34. Sanosri
35. Sanvav
36. Sonariya
37. Sonpura
38. Thordi
39. Umedpara
40. Undari
41. Vadli
42. Vadviyala
43. Velakot
