= Nava Ugla =

- Village
- Location in Gujarat, India Nava Ugla (India)
- Coordinates: 20.940104°N 71.036577°E
- Country: India
- State: Gujarat
- District: Gir Somnath
- Taluka: Gir Gadhada

Government
  - Type: Panchayati raj (India)
  - Body: Gram panchayat

Area
  - Total: 561.99 ha (1,388.7 acres)

Population (2011)
  - Total: 958
  - Density: 170/km^{2} (442/sq mi)
- Sex ratio 486/472♂/♀

Languages
  - Official: Gujarati
- Time zone: UTC+5:30 (IST)
- PIN: 362565
- Vehicle registration: GJ
- Census code of Nava Ugla: 515265
- Nearest city: Gir Gadhada, Una
- Website: girsomnathdp.gujarat.gov.in

Nava Ugla, also known as Ugla, is a village / panchayat located in the Gir Gadhada Taluka of Gir Somnath district in Gujarat, India. Earlier, until August 2013, Nava Ugla was part of Una Taluka and Junagadh district. The latitude 20.940104 and longitude 71.036577 are the geo-coordinate of the Village Nava Ugla. Gandhinagar is the state capital of Nava Ugla village which is located around 350 kilometres away from Nava Ugla.

According to Census 2011, with the 178 families, the population of this village is 958. Out of this, 486 are males and 472 are females. Most residents are dependent on agriculture.

== Demographics ==
According to the 2011 census of India, Nava Ugla has 178 households. The effective literacy rate (i.e. the literacy rate of population excluding children aged 6 and below) is 68.01%

Demographics (2011 Census)
	Total	Male	Female
Population	958	486	472
Children aged below 6 years	114	60	54
Scheduled caste	112	48	64
Scheduled tribe	6	2	4
Literates	574	329	245
Illiterates	384	157	227
Total Workers	394	275	119
Main workers	339	251	88
Main workers: Cultivators	108	96	12
Main workers: Agricultural labourers	127	67	60
Main workers: Household industry workers	17	13	4
Main workers: Other	87	75	12
Marginal workers (total)	55	24	31
Marginal workers: Cultivators	7	2	5
Marginal workers: Agricultural labourers	9	5	4
Marginal workers: Household industry workers	5	4	1
Marginal workers: Others	34	13	21
Non-workers	564	211	353

== List of villages in Gir Gadhada Taluka ==
Below is the Revenue records list of forty-three villages of Gir Gadhada Taluka including Gir Gadhada village.

1. Ambavad
2. Ankolali
3. Babariya
4. Bediya
5. Bhakha
6. Bhiyal
7. Bodidar
8. Dhokadva
9. Dhrabavad
10. Dron
11. Fareda
12. Fatsar
13. Fulka
14. Gir Gadhada
15. Harmadiya
16. Itvaya
17. Jamvala
18. Jaragli
19. Jhanjhariya
20. Jhudvadli
21. Juna Ugla
22. Kanakiya
23. Kaneri
24. Kansariya
25. Khilavad
26. Kodiya
27. Mahobatpara
28. Motisar
29. Nagadiya
30. Nava Ugla
31. Nitli
32. Panderi
33. Rasulpara
34. Sanosri
35. Sanvav
36. Sonariya
37. Sonpura
38. Thordi
39. Umedpara
40. Undari
41. Vadli
42. Vadviyala
43. Velakot
