= Panderi (Gir Gadhada) =

- Village
- Location in Gujarat, India Panderi (India)
- Coordinates: 20.857077°N 70.920291°E
- Country: India
- State: Gujarat
- District: Gir Somnath
- Taluka: Gir Gadhada

Government
  - Type: Panchayati raj (India)
  - Body: Gram panchayat

Area
  - Total: 337.01 ha (832.8 acres)

Population (2011)
  - Total: 743
  - Density: 220/km^{2} (571/sq mi)
- Sex ratio 360/383♂/♀

Languages
  - Official: Gujarati
- Time zone: UTC+5:30 (IST)
- PIN: 362560
- Vehicle registration: GJ
- Census code of Panderi: 515290
- Nearest city: Gir Gadhada, Una
- Website: girsomnathdp.gujarat.gov.in

Panderi is a village / panchayat located in the Gir Gadhada Taluka of Gir Somnath district in Gujarat State, India. Earlier, until August 2013, Panderi was part of Una Taluka and Junagadh district. The latitude 20.857077 and longitude 70.920291 are the geo-coordinate of the Village Panderi. Gandhinagar is the state capital of Panderi village which is located around 400 kilometres away from Panderi.

According to Census 2011, with the 119 families, the population of this village is 743. Out of this, 360 are males and 383 are females. Most residents are dependent on agriculture.

== Demographics ==
According to the 2011 census of India, Panderi has 119 households. The effective literacy rate (i.e. the literacy rate of population excluding children aged 6 and below) is 67.95%

Demographics (2011 Census)
	Total	Male	Female
Population	743	360	383
Children aged below 6 years	119	62	57
Scheduled caste	-	-	-
Scheduled tribe	-	-	-
Literates	424	251	173
Illiterates	319	109	210
Total Workers	363	209	154
Main workers	326	201	125
Main workers: Cultivators	137	88	49
Main workers: Agricultural labourers	165	91	74
Main workers: Household industry workers	-	-	-
Main workers: Other	24	22	2
Marginal workers (total)	37	8	29
Marginal workers: Cultivators	18	4	14
Marginal workers: Agricultural labourers	18	4	14
Marginal workers: Household industry workers	-	-	-
Marginal workers: Others	1	-	1
Non-workers	380	151	229

== List of villages in Gir Gadhada Taluka ==
Below is the Revenue records list of forty-three villages of Gir Gadhada Taluka including Gir Gadhada village.

1. Ambavad
2. Ankolali
3. Babariya
4. Bediya
5. Bhakha
6. Bhiyal
7. Bodidar
8. Dhokadva
9. Dhrabavad
10. Dron
11. Fareda
12. Fatsar
13. Fulka
14. Gir Gadhada
15. Harmadiya
16. Itvaya
17. Jamvala
18. Jaragli
19. Jhanjhariya
20. Jhudvadli
21. Juna Ugla
22. Kanakiya
23. Kaneri
24. Kansariya
25. Khilavad
26. Kodiya
27. Mahobatpara
28. Motisar
29. Nagadiya
30. Nava Ugla
31. Nitli
32. Panderi
33. Rasulpara
34. Sanosri
35. Sanvav
36. Sonariya
37. Sonpura
38. Thordi
39. Umedpara
40. Undari
41. Vadli
42. Vadviyala
43. Velakot
