= Bodidar =

- Village
- Location in Gujarat, India Bodidar (India)
- Coordinates: 20.84552°N 70.852991°E
- Country: India
- State: Gujarat
- District: Gir Somnath
- Taluka: Gir Gadhada

Government
  - Type: Panchayati raj (India)
  - Body: Gram panchayat

Area
  - Total: 1,348.74 ha (3,332.8 acres)

Population (2011)
  - Total: 3,150
  - Density: 234/km^{2} (605/sq mi)
- Sex ratio 1611/1539♂/♀

Languages
  - Official: Gujarati
- Time zone: UTC+5:30 (IST)
- PIN: 362560
- Vehicle registration: GJ
- Census code of Bodidar: 515296
- Nearest city: Gir Gadhada, Una
- Website: girsomnathdp.gujarat.gov.in

Bodidar is a village / panchayat located in the Gir Gadhada Taluka of Gir Somnath district in Gujarat State, India. Earlier, until August 2013, Bodidar was part of Una Taluka and Junagadh district. Gandhinagar is the state capital of Bodidar village which is located around 400 kilometres away from Bodidar.

According to Census 2011, with the 552 families, the population of this village is 3150. Out of this, 1611 are males and 1539 are females. Most residents are dependent on agriculture.

== Demographics ==
According to the 2011 census of India, Bodidar has 552 households. The effective literacy rate (i.e. the literacy rate of population excluding children aged 6 and below) is 68.8%

Demographics (2011 Census)
	Total	Male	Female
Population	3150	1611	1539
Children aged below 6 years	442	227	215
Scheduled caste	518	271	247
Scheduled tribe	-	-	-
Literates	1863	1080	783
Illiterates	1287	531	756
Total Workers	1305	893	412
Main workers	1064	871	193
Main workers: Cultivators	498	426	72
Main workers: Agricultural labourers	404	304	100
Main workers: Household industry workers	-	-	-
Main workers: Other	162	141	21
Marginal workers (total)	241	22	219
Marginal workers: Cultivators	55	15	40
Marginal workers: Agricultural labourers	178	3	175
Marginal workers: Household industry workers	-	-	-
Marginal workers: Others	8	4	4
Non-workers	1845	718	1127

== List of villages in Gir Gadhada Taluka ==
Below is the Revenue records list of forty-three villages of Gir Gadhada Taluka including Gir Gadhada village.

1. Ambavad
2. Ankolali
3. Babariya
4. Bediya
5. Bhakha
6. Bhiyal
7. Bodidar
8. Dhokadva
9. Dhrabavad
10. Dron
11. Fareda
12. Fatsar
13. Fulka
14. Gir Gadhada
15. Harmadiya
16. Itvaya
17. Jamvala
18. Jaragli
19. Jhanjhariya
20. Jhudvadli
21. Juna Ugla
22. Kanakiya
23. Kaneri
24. Kansariya
25. Khilavad
26. Kodiya
27. Mahobatpara
28. Motisar
29. Nagadiya
30. Nava Ugla
31. Nitli
32. Panderi
33. Rasulpara
34. Sanosri
35. Sanvav
36. Sonariya
37. Sonpura
38. Thordi
39. Umedpara
40. Undari
41. Vadli
42. Vadviyala
43. Velakot
