= Nitli =

- Village
- Location in Gujarat, India Nitli (India)
- Coordinates: 21.002937°N 71.097014°E
- Country: India
- State: Gujarat
- District: Gir Somnath
- Taluka: Gir Gadhada

Government
  - Type: Panchayati raj (India)
  - Body: Gram panchayat

Area
  - Total: 720.37 ha (1,780.1 acres)

Population (2011)
  - Total: 1,082
  - Density: 150.2/km^{2} (389.0/sq mi)
- Sex ratio 538/544♂/♀

Languages
  - Official: Gujarati
- Time zone: UTC+5:30 (IST)
- PIN: 362530
- Vehicle registration: GJ
- Census code of Nitli: 515244
- Nearest city: Gir Gadhada, Una
- Website: girsomnathdp.gujarat.gov.in

Nitli is a village / panchayat located in the Gir Gadhada Taluka of Gir Somnath district in Gujarat State, India. Earlier, until August 2013, Nitli was part of Una Taluka and Junagadh district. The latitude 21.002937 and longitude 71.097014 are the geo-coordinate of the Village Nitli. Gandhinagar is the state capital of Nitli village which is located around 350 kilometres away from Nitli.

According to Census 2011, with the 208 families, the population of this village is 1082. Out of this, 538 are males and 544 are females. Most residents are dependent on agriculture.

== Demographics ==
According to the 2011 census of India, Nitli has 208 households. The effective literacy rate (i.e. the literacy rate of population excluding children aged 6 and below) is 70.25%

Demographics (2011 Census)
	Total	Male	Female
Population	1082	538	544
Children aged below 6 years	124	59	65
Scheduled caste	39	19	20
Scheduled tribe	42	22	20
Literates	673	373	300
Illiterates	409	165	244
Total Workers	506	332	174
Main workers	443	310	133
Main workers: Cultivators	208	171	37
Main workers: Agricultural labourers	148	65	83
Main workers: Household industry workers	2	1	1
Main workers: Other	85	73	12
Marginal workers (total)	63	22	41
Marginal workers: Cultivators	8	5	3
Marginal workers: Agricultural labourers	41	9	32
Marginal workers: Household industry workers	-	-	-
Marginal workers: Others	14	8	6
Non-workers	576	206	370

== List of Villages in Gir Gadhada Taluka ==
Below is the Revenue records list of forty-three villages of Gir Gadhada Taluka including Gir Gadhada village.

1. Ambavad
2. Ankolali
3. Babariya
4. Bediya
5. Bhakha
6. Bhiyal
7. Bodidar
8. Dhokadva
9. Dhrabavad
10. Dron
11. Fareda
12. Fatsar
13. Fulka
14. Gir Gadhada
15. Harmadiya
16. Itvaya
17. Jamvala
18. Jaragli
19. Jhanjhariya
20. Jhudvadli
21. Juna Ugla
22. Kanakiya
23. Kaneri
24. Kansariya
25. Khilavad
26. Kodiya
27. Mahobatpara
28. Motisar
29. Nagadiya
30. Nava Ugla
31. Nitli
32. Panderi
33. Rasulpara
34. Sanosri
35. Sanvav
36. Sonariya
37. Sonpura
38. Thordi
39. Umedpara
40. Undari
41. Vadli
42. Vadviyala
43. Velakot
