= Umedpara =

Village in Gujarat, India; known for agriculture

- Village
- Location in Gujarat, India Umedpara (India)
- Coordinates: 20.909597°N 70.893243°E
- Country: India
- State: Gujarat
- District: Gir Somnath
- Taluka: Gir Gadhada

Government
  - Type: Panchayati raj (India)
  - Body: Gram panchayat

Area
  - Total: 662.19 ha (1,636.3 acres)

Population (2011)
  - Total: 1,244
  - Density: 187.9/km^{2} (486.6/sq mi)
- Sex ratio 636/608♂/♀

Languages
  - Official: Gujarati
- Time zone: UTC+5:30 (IST)
- PIN: 362530
- Vehicle registration: GJ
- Census code of Umedpara: 515268
- Nearest city: Gir Gadhada, Una
- Website: girsomnathdp.gujarat.gov.in

Umedpara is a village / panchayat located in the Gir Gadhada Taluka of Gir Somnath district in Gujarat State, India. Earlier, until August 2013, Umedpara was part of Una Taluka and Junagadh district. The latitude 20.909597 and longitude 70.893243 are the geo-coordinate of the Village Umedpara. Gandhinagar is the state capital of Umedpara village which is located around 400 kilometres away from Umedpara.

According to Census 2011, with the 229 families, the population of this village is 1244. Out of this, 636 are males and 608 are females. Most residents are dependent on agriculture.

== Demographics ==
According to the 2011 census of India, Umedpara has 229 households. The effective literacy rate (i.e. the literacy rate of population excluding children aged 6 and below) is 79.23%

Demographics (2011 Census)
	Total	Male	Female
Population	1244	636	608
Children aged below 6 years	108	58	50
Scheduled caste	113	57	56
Scheduled tribe	-	-	-
Literates	900	520	380
Illiterates	344	116	228
Total Workers	714	394	320
Main workers	407	383	24
Main workers: Cultivators	259	245	14
Main workers: Agricultural labourers	89	82	7
Main workers: Household industry workers	-	-	-
Main workers: Other	59	56	3
Marginal workers (total)	307	11	296
Marginal workers: Cultivators	223	6	217
Marginal workers: Agricultural labourers	74	-	74
Marginal workers: Household industry workers	-	-	-
Marginal workers: Others	10	5	5
Non-workers	530	242	288

== List of Villages in Gir Gadhada Taluka ==
Below is the Revenue records list of forty-three villages of Gir Gadhada Taluka including Gir Gadhada village.

1. Ambavad
2. Ankolali
3. Babariya
4. Bediya
5. Bhakha
6. Bhiyal
7. Bodidar
8. Dhokadva
9. Dhrabavad
10. Dron
11. Fareda
12. Fatsar
13. Fulka
14. Gir Gadhada
15. Harmadiya
16. Itvaya
17. Jamvala
18. Jaragli
19. Jhanjhariya
20. Jhudvadli
21. Juna Ugla
22. Kanakiya
23. Kaneri
24. Kansariya
25. Khilavad
26. Kodiya
27. Mahobatpara
28. Motisar
29. Nagadiya
30. Nava Ugla
31. Nitli
32. Panderi
33. Rasulpara
34. Sanosri
35. Sanvav
36. Sonariya
37. Sonpura
38. Thordi
39. Umedpara
40. Undari
41. Vadli
42. Vadviyala
43. Velakot
