= Sanosri =

- Village
- Location in Gujarat, India Sanosri (India)
- Coordinates: 20.95536°N 71.046577°E
- Country: India
- State: Gujarat
- District: Gir Somnath
- Taluka: Gir Gadhada

Government
  - Type: Panchayati raj (India)
  - Body: Gram panchayat

Area
  - Total: 446.8 ha (1,104 acres)

Population (2011)
  - Total: 1,233
  - Density: 276.0/km^{2} (714.7/sq mi)
- Sex ratio 596/637♂/♀

Languages
  - Official: Gujarati
- Time zone: UTC+5:30 (IST)
- PIN: 362530
- Vehicle registration: GJ
- Census code of Sanosri: 515258
- Nearest city: Gir Gadhada, Una
- Website: girsomnathdp.gujarat.gov.in

Sanosri is a village / panchayat located in the Gir Gadhada Taluka of Gir Somnath district in Gujarat State, India. Earlier, until August 2013, Sanosri was part of Una Taluka and Junagadh district. The latitude 20.95536 and longitude 71.046577 are the geo-coordinate of the Village Sanosri. Gandhinagar is the state capital of Sanosri village which is located around 350 kilometres away from Sanosri.

According to Census 2011, with the 186 families, the population of this village is 1233. Out of this, 596 are males and 637 are females. Most residents are dependent on agriculture.

== Demographics ==
According to the 2011 census of India, Sanosri has 186 households. The effective literacy rate (i.e. the literacy rate of population excluding children aged 6 and below) is 69.74%

Demographics (2011 Census)
	Total	Male	Female
Population	1233	596	637
Children aged below 6 years	192	97	95
Scheduled caste	-	-	-
Scheduled tribe	-	-	-
Literates	726	410	316
Illiterates	507	186	321
Total Workers	617	311	306
Main workers	471	308	163
Main workers: Cultivators	367	226	141
Main workers: Agricultural labourers	36	20	16
Main workers: Household industry workers	-	-	-
Main workers: Other	68	62	6
Marginal workers (total)	146	3	143
Marginal workers: Cultivators	38	1	37
Marginal workers: Agricultural labourers	104	1	103
Marginal workers: Household industry workers	-	-	-
Marginal workers: Others	4	1	3
Non-workers	616	285	331

== List of villages in Gir Gadhada Taluka ==
Below is the Revenue records list of forty-three villages of Gir Gadhada Taluka including Gir Gadhada village.

1. Ambavad
2. Ankolali
3. Babariya
4. Bediya
5. Bhakha
6. Bhiyal
7. Bodidar
8. Dhokadva
9. Dhrabavad
10. Dron
11. Fareda
12. Fatsar
13. Fulka
14. Gir Gadhada
15. Harmadiya
16. Itvaya
17. Jamvala
18. Jaragli
19. Jhanjhariya
20. Jhudvadli
21. Juna Ugla
22. Kanakiya
23. Kaneri
24. Kansariya
25. Khilavad
26. Kodiya
27. Mahobatpara
28. Motisar
29. Nagadiya
30. Nava Ugla
31. Nitli
32. Panderi
33. Rasulpara
34. Sanosri
35. Sanvav
36. Sonariya
37. Sonpura
38. Thordi
39. Umedpara
40. Undari
41. Vadli
42. Vadviyala
43. Velakot
