= Kaneri =

- Village
- Location in Gujarat, India Kaneri (India)
- Coordinates: 20.845802°N 70.89972°E
- Country: India
- State: Gujarat
- District: Gir Somnath
- Taluka: Gir Gadhada

Government
  - Type: Panchayati raj (India)
  - Body: Gram panchayat

Area
  - Total: 516.22 ha (1,275.6 acres)

Population (2011)
  - Total: 1,648
  - Density: 319.2/km^{2} (826.8/sq mi)
- Sex ratio 836/812♂/♀

Languages
  - Official: Gujarati
- Time zone: UTC+5:30 (IST)
- PIN: 362560
- Vehicle registration: GJ
- Census code of Kaneri: 515297
- Nearest city: Gir Gadhada, Una
- Website: girsomnathdp.gujarat.gov.in

Kaneri is a village / panchayat located in the Gir Gadhada Taluka of Gir Somnath district in Gujarat State, India. Earlier, until August 2013, Kaneri was part of Una Taluka and Junagadh district. The latitude 20.845802 and longitude 70.89972 are the geo-coordinate of the Village Kaneri. Gandhinagar is the state capital of Kaneri village which is located around 400 kilometres away from Kaneri.

According to Census 2011, with the 286 families, the population of this village is 1648. Out of this, 836 are males and 812 are females. Most residents are dependent on agriculture.

== Demographics ==
According to the 2011 census of India, Kaneri has 286 households. The effective literacy rate (i.e. the literacy rate of population excluding children aged 6 and below) is 67.11%

Demographics (2011 Census)
	Total	Male	Female
Population	1648	836	812
Children aged below 6 years	216	120	96
Scheduled caste	44	24	20
Scheduled tribe	-	-	-
Literates	961	565	396
Illiterates	687	271	416
Total Workers	550	414	136
Main workers	516	410	106
Main workers: Cultivators	284	238	46
Main workers: Agricultural labourers	185	136	49
Main workers: Household industry workers	-	-	-
Main workers: Other	47	36	11
Marginal workers (total)	34	4	30
Marginal workers: Cultivators	16	1	15
Marginal workers: Agricultural labourers	16	2	14
Marginal workers: Household industry workers	-	-	-
Marginal workers: Others	2	1	1
Non-workers	1098	422	676

== List of villages in Gir Gadhada Taluka ==
Below is the Revenue records list of forty-three villages of Gir Gadhada Taluka including Gir Gadhada village.

1. Ambavad
2. Ankolali
3. Babariya
4. Bediya
5. Bhakha
6. Bhiyal
7. Bodidar
8. Dhokadva
9. Dhrabavad
10. Dron
11. Fareda
12. Fatsar
13. Fulka
14. Gir Gadhada
15. Harmadiya
16. Itvaya
17. Jamvala
18. Jaragli
19. Jhanjhariya
20. Jhudvadli
21. Juna Ugla
22. Kanakiya
23. Kaneri, Gujarat
24. Kansariya
25. Khilavad
26. Kodiya
27. Mahobatpara
28. Motisar
29. Nagadiya
30. Nava Ugla
31. Nitli
32. Panderi
33. Rasulpara
34. Sanosri
35. Sanvav
36. Sonariya
37. Sonpura
38. Thordi
39. Umedpara
40. Undari
41. Vadli
42. Vadviyala
43. Velakot
