= Juna Ugla =

- Village
- Location in Gujarat, India Juna Ugla (India)
- Coordinates: 20.914066°N 71.032297°E
- Country: India
- State: Gujarat
- District: Gir Somnath
- Taluka: Gir Gadhada

Government
  - Type: Panchayati raj (India)
  - Body: Gram panchayat

Area
  - Total: 692.89 ha (1,712.2 acres)

Population (2011)
  - Total: 2,514
  - Density: 362.8/km^{2} (939.7/sq mi)
- Sex ratio 1265/1249♂/♀

Languages
  - Official: Gujarati
- Time zone: UTC+5:30 (IST)
- PIN: 362560
- Vehicle registration: GJ
- Census code of Juna Ugla: 515274
- Nearest city: Gir Gadhada, Una
- Website: girsomnathdp.gujarat.gov.in

Juna Ugla is a village / panchayat located in the Gir Gadhada Taluka of Gir Somnath district in Gujarat State, India. Earlier, until August 2013, Juna Ugla was part of Una Taluka and Junagadh district. The latitude 20.914066 and longitude 71.032297 are the geo-coordinate of the Village Juna Ugla. Gandhinagar is the state capital of Juna Ugla village which is located around 375 kilometres away from Juna Ugla.

According to Census 2011, with the 437 families, the population of this village is 2514. Out of this, 1265 are males and 1249 are females. Most residents are dependent on agriculture.

== Demographics ==
According to the 2011 census of India, Ugla has 437 households. The effective literacy rate (i.e. the literacy rate of population excluding children aged 6 and below) is 65.59%

Demographics (2011 Census)
	Total	Male	Female
Population	2514	1265	1249
Children aged below 6 years	340	175	165
Scheduled caste	-	-	-
Scheduled tribe	8	4	4
Literates	1426	868	558
Illiterates	1088	397	691
Total Workers	1126	708	418
Main workers	741	650	91
Main workers: Cultivators	299	288	11
Main workers: Agricultural labourers	240	173	67
Main workers: Household industry workers	3	3	-
Main workers: Other	199	186	13
Marginal workers (total)	385	58	327
Marginal workers: Cultivators	292	4	288
Marginal workers: Agricultural labourers	28	2	26
Marginal workers: Household industry workers	6	2	4
Marginal workers: Others	59	50	9
Non-workers	1388	557	831

== List of villages in Gir Gadhada Taluka ==
Below is the Revenue records list of forty-three villages of Gir Gadhada Taluka including Gir Gadhada village.

1. Ambavad
2. Ankolali
3. Babariya
4. Bediya
5. Bhakha
6. Bhiyal
7. Bodidar
8. Dhokadva
9. Dhrabavad
10. Dron
11. Fareda
12. Fatsar
13. Fulka
14. Gir Gadhada
15. Harmadiya
16. Itvaya
17. Jamvala
18. Jaragli
19. Jhanjhariya
20. Jhudvadli
21. Juna Ugla
22. Kanakiya
23. Kaneri
24. Kansariya
25. Khilavad
26. Kodiya
27. Mahobatpara
28. Motisar
29. Nagadiya
30. Nava Ugla
31. Nitli
32. Panderi
33. Rasulpara
34. Sanosri
35. Sanvav
36. Sonariya
37. Sonpura
38. Thordi
39. Umedpara
40. Undari
41. Vadli
42. Vadviyala
43. Velakot
