= Rasulpara =

- Village
- Location in Gujarat, India Rasulpara (India)
- Coordinates: 20.962273°N 70.925439°E
- Country: India
- State: Gujarat
- District: Gir Somnath
- Taluka: Gir Gadhada

Government
  - Type: Panchayati raj (India)
  - Body: Gram panchayat

Area
  - Total: 794.33 ha (1,962.8 acres)

Population (2011)
  - Total: 1,495
  - Density: 188.2/km^{2} (487.5/sq mi)
- Sex ratio 765/730♂/♀

Languages
  - Official: Gujarati
- Time zone: UTC+5:30 (IST)
- PIN: 362530
- Vehicle registration: GJ
- Census code of Rasulpara: 515250
- Nearest city: Gir Gadhada, Una
- Website: girsomnathdp.gujarat.gov.in

Rasulpara is a village / panchayat located in the Gir Gadhada Taluka of Gir Somnath district in Gujarat State, India. Earlier, until August 2013, Rasulpara was part of Una Taluka and Junagadh district. The latitude 20.962273 and longitude 70.925439 are the geo-coordinate of the Village Rasulpara. Gandhinagar is the state capital of Rasulpara village which is located around 375 kilometres away from Rasulpara.

According to Census 2011, with the 234 families, the population of this village is 1495. Out of this, 765 are males and 730 are females. Most residents are dependent on agriculture.

== Demographics ==
According to the 2011 census of India, Rasulpara has 234 households. The effective literacy rate (i.e. the literacy rate of population excluding children aged 6 and below) is 64.44%

Demographics (2011 Census)
	Total	Male	Female
Population	1495	765	730
Children aged below 6 years	269	126	143
Scheduled caste	25	14	11
Scheduled tribe	61	33	28
Literates	790	488	302
Illiterates	705	277	428
Total Workers	613	393	220
Main workers	517	376	141
Main workers: Cultivators	195	165	30
Main workers: Agricultural labourers	197	98	99
Main workers: Household industry workers	-	-	-
Main workers: Other	125	113	12
Marginal workers (total)	96	17	79
Marginal workers: Cultivators	9	3	6
Marginal workers: Agricultural labourers	58	11	47
Marginal workers: Household industry workers	-	-	-
Marginal workers: Others	29	3	26
Non-workers	882	372	510

== List of Villages in Gir Gadhada Taluka ==
Below is the Revenue records list of forty-three villages of Gir Gadhada Taluka including Gir Gadhada village.

1. Ambavad
2. Ankolali
3. Babariya
4. Bediya
5. Bhakha
6. Bhiyal
7. Bodidar
8. Dhokadva
9. Dhrabavad
10. Dron
11. Fareda
12. Fatsar
13. Fulka
14. Gir Gadhada
15. Harmadiya
16. Itvaya
17. Jamvala
18. Jaragli
19. Jhanjhariya
20. Jhudvadli
21. Juna Ugla
22. Kanakiya
23. Kaneri
24. Kansariya
25. Khilavad
26. Kodiya
27. Mahobatpara
28. Motisar
29. Nagadiya
30. Nava Ugla
31. Nitli
32. Panderi
33. Rasulpara
34. Sanosri
35. Sanvav
36. Sonariya
37. Sonpura
38. Thordi
39. Umedpara
40. Undari
41. Vadli
42. Vadviyala
43. Velakot
