= Fulka =

- Village
- Location in Gujarat, India Fulka (India)
- Coordinates: 20.852229°N 70.940516°E
- Country: India
- State: Gujarat
- District: Gir Somnath
- Taluka: Gir Gadhada

Government
  - Type: Panchayati raj (India)
  - Body: Gram panchayat

Area
  - Total: 643.71 ha (1,590.6 acres)

Population (2011)
  - Total: 1,553
  - Density: 241.3/km^{2} (624.9/sq mi)
- Sex ratio 782/771♂/♀

Languages
  - Official: Gujarati
- Time zone: UTC+5:30 (IST)
- PIN: 362560
- Vehicle registration: GJ
- Census code of Fulka: 515298
- Nearest city: Gir Gadhada, Una
- Website: girsomnathdp.gujarat.gov.in

Fulka is a village / panchayat located in the Gir Gadhada Taluka of Gir Somnath district in Gujarat State, India. Earlier, until August 2013, Fulka was part of Una Taluka and Junagadh district. The latitude 20.852229 and longitude 70.940516 are the geo-coordinate of the Village Fulka. Gandhinagar is the state capital of Fulka village which is located around 400 kilometers away from Fulka.

According to Census 2011, with the 252 families, the population of this village is 1553. Out of this, 782 are males and 771 are females. Most residents are dependent on agriculture.

== Demographics ==
According to the 2011 census of India, Fulka has 252 households. The effective literacy rate (i.e. the literacy rate of population excluding children aged 6 and below) is 71.5%

Demographics (2011 Census)
	Total	Male	Female
Population	1553	782	771
Children aged below 6 years	244	116	128
Scheduled caste	7	4	3
Scheduled tribe	-	-	-
Literates	936	571	365
Illiterates	617	211	406
Total Workers	460	452	8
Main workers	456	448	8
Main workers: Cultivators	276	272	4
Main workers: Agricultural labourers	166	163	3
Main workers: Household industry workers	1	1	-
Main workers: Other	13	12	1
Marginal workers (total)	4	4	-
Marginal workers: Cultivators	1	1	-
Marginal workers: Agricultural labourers	1	1	-
Marginal workers: Household industry workers	-	-	-
Marginal workers: Others	2	2	-
Non-workers	1093	330	763

== List of villages in Gir Gadhada Taluka ==
Below is the Revenue records list of forty-three villages of Gir Gadhada Taluka including Gir Gadhada village.

1. Ambavad
2. Ankolali
3. Babariya
4. Bediya
5. Bhakha
6. Bhiyal
7. Bodidar
8. Dhokadva
9. Dhrabavad
10. Dron
11. Fareda
12. Fatsar
13. Fulka
14. Gir Gadhada
15. Harmadiya
16. Itvaya
17. Jamvala
18. Jaragli
19. Jhanjhariya
20. Jhudvadli
21. Juna Ugla
22. Kanakiya
23. Kaneri
24. Kansariya
25. Khilavad
26. Kodiya
27. Mahobatpara
28. Motisar
29. Nagadiya
30. Nava Ugla
31. Nitli
32. Panderi
33. Rasulpara
34. Sanosri
35. Sanvav
36. Sonariya
37. Sonpura
38. Thordi
39. Umedpara
40. Undari
41. Vadli
42. Vadviyala
43. Velakot
