= Jamvala =

- Village
- Location in Gujarat, India Jamvala (India)
- Coordinates: 20.98354°N 70.767629°E
- Country: India
- State: Gujarat
- District: Gir Somnath
- Taluka: Gir Gadhada

Government
  - Type: Panchayati raj (India)
  - Body: Gram panchayat

Area
  - Total: 1,078.96 ha (2,666.2 acres)

Population (2011)
  - Total: 3,797
  - Density: 351.9/km^{2} (911.5/sq mi)
- Sex ratio 1961/1836♂/♀

Languages
  - Official: Gujarati
- Time zone: UTC+5:30 (IST)
- PIN: 362530
- Vehicle registration: GJ
- Census code of Jamvala: 515236
- Nearest city: Gir Gadhada, Una
- Website: girsomnathdp.gujarat.gov.in

Jamvala is a village / panchayat located in the Gir Gadhada Taluka of Gir Somnath district in Gujarat State, India. Earlier, until August 2013, Jamvala was part of Una Taluka and Junagadh district. The latitude 20.98354 and longitude 70.767629 are the geo-coordinate of the Village Jamvala. Gandhinagar is the state capital of Jamvala village which is located around 375 kilometres away from Jamvala.

According to Census 2011, with the 748 families, the population of this village is 3797. Out of this, 1961 are males and 1836 are females. Most residents are dependent on agriculture.

== Demographics ==
According to the 2011 census of India, Jamvala has 748 households. The effective literacy rate (i.e. the literacy rate of population excluding children aged 6 and below) is 71.69%

Demographics (2011 Census)
	Total	Male	Female
Population	3797	1961	1836
Children aged below 6 years	505	250	255
Scheduled caste	94	49	45
Scheduled tribe	94	48	46
Literates	2360	1347	1013
Illiterates	1437	614	823
Total Workers	1514	1127	387
Main workers	1497	1115	382
Main workers: Cultivators	397	332	65
Main workers: Agricultural labourers	791	514	277
Main workers: Household industry workers	17	16	1
Main workers: Other	292	253	39
Marginal workers (total)	17	12	5
Marginal workers: Cultivators	2	-	2
Marginal workers: Agricultural labourers	9	6	3
Marginal workers: Household industry workers	-	-	-
Marginal workers: Others	6	6	-
Non-workers	2283	834	1449

== List of Villages in Gir Gadhada Taluka ==
Below is the Revenue records list of forty-three villages of Gir Gadhada Taluka including Gir Gadhada village.

1. Ambavad
2. Ankolali
3. Babariya
4. Bediya
5. Bhakha
6. Bhiyal
7. Bodidar
8. Dhokadva
9. Dhrabavad
10. Dron
11. Fareda
12. Fatsar
13. Fulka
14. Gir Gadhada
15. Harmadiya
16. Itvaya
17. Jamvala
18. Jaragli
19. Jhanjhariya
20. Jhudvadli
21. Juna Ugla
22. Kanakiya
23. Kaneri
24. Kansariya
25. Khilavad
26. Kodiya
27. Mahobatpara
28. Motisar
29. Nagadiya
30. Nava Ugla
31. Nitli
32. Panderi
33. Rasulpara
34. Sanosri
35. Sanvav
36. Sonariya
37. Sonpura
38. Thordi
39. Umedpara
40. Undari
41. Vadli
42. Vadviyala
43. Velakot
