= Kanakiya =

- Village
- Location in Gujarat, India Kanakiya (India)
- Coordinates: 20.832226°N 70.896326°E
- Country: India
- State: Gujarat
- District: Gir Somnath
- Taluka: Gir Gadhada

Government
  - Type: Panchayati raj (India)
  - Body: Gram panchayat

Area
  - Total: 550.02 ha (1,359.1 acres)

Population (2011)
  - Total: 2,096
  - Density: 381.1/km^{2} (987.0/sq mi)
- Sex ratio 1015/1081♂/♀

Languages
  - Official: Gujarati
- Time zone: UTC+5:30 (IST)
- PIN: 362560
- Vehicle registration: GJ
- Census code of Kanakiya: 515316
- Nearest city: Gir Gadhada, Una
- Website: girsomnathdp.gujarat.gov.in

Kanakiya is a village / panchayat located in the Gir Gadhada Taluka of Gir Somnath district in Gujarat State, India. Earlier, until August 2013, Kanakiya was part of Una Taluka and Junagadh district. The latitude 20.832226 and longitude 70.896326 are the geo-coordinate of the Village Kanakiya. Gandhinagar is the state capital of Kanakiya village which is located around 400 kilometres away from Kanakiya.

According to Census 2011, with the 374 families, the population of this village is 2096. Out of this, 1015 are males and 1081 are females. Most residents are dependent on agriculture.

== Demographics ==
According to the 2011 census of India, Kanakiya has 374 households. The effective literacy rate (i.e. the literacy rate of population excluding children aged 6 and below) is 75.76%

Demographics (2011 Census)
	Total	Male	Female
Population	2096	1015	1081
Children aged below 6 years	223	113	110
Scheduled caste	399	192	207
Scheduled tribe	-	-	-
Literates	1419	778	641
Illiterates	677	237	440
Total Workers	1050	602	448
Main workers	823	535	288
Main workers: Cultivators	466	288	178
Main workers: Agricultural labourers	236	146	90
Main workers: Household industry workers	-	-	-
Main workers: Other	121	101	20
Marginal workers (total)	227	67	160
Marginal workers: Cultivators	95	16	79
Marginal workers: Agricultural labourers	115	40	75
Marginal workers: Household industry workers	-	-	-
Marginal workers: Others	17	11	6
Non-workers	1046	413	633

== List of villages in Gir Gadhada Taluka ==
Below is the Revenue records list of forty-three villages of Gir Gadhada Taluka including Gir Gadhada village.

1. Ambavad
2. Ankolali
3. Babariya
4. Bediya
5. Bhakha
6. Bhiyal
7. Bodidar
8. Dhokadva
9. Dhrabavad
10. Dron
11. Fareda
12. Fatsar
13. Fulka
14. Gir Gadhada
15. Harmadiya
16. Itvaya
17. Jamvala
18. Jaragli
19. Jhanjhariya
20. Jhudvadli
21. Juna Ugla
22. Kanakiya
23. Kaneri
24. Kansariya
25. Khilavad
26. Kodiya
27. Mahobatpara
28. Motisar
29. Nagadiya
30. Nava Ugla
31. Nitli
32. Panderi
33. Rasulpara
34. Sanosri
35. Sanvav
36. Sonariya
37. Sonpura
38. Thordi
39. Umedpara
40. Undari
41. Vadli
42. Vadviyala
43. Velakot
