= Bediya =

- Village
- Location in Gujarat, India Bediya (India)
- Coordinates: 20.971288°N 71.105822°E
- Country: India
- State: Gujarat
- District: Gir Somnath
- Taluka: Gir Gadhada

Government
  - Type: Panchayati raj (India)
  - Body: Gram panchayat

Area
  - Total: 966.96 ha (2,389.4 acres)

Population (2011)
  - Total: 2,220
  - Density: 230/km^{2} (595/sq mi)
- Sex ratio 1078/1142♂/♀

Languages
  - Official: Gujarati
- Time zone: UTC+5:30 (IST)
- PIN: 362530
- Vehicle registration: GJ
- Census code of Bediya: 515260
- Nearest city: Gir Gadhada, Una
- Website: girsomnathdp.gujarat.gov.in

Bediya is a village located in the Gir Gadhada Taluka of Gir Somnath district in Gujarat State, India. Earlier, until August 2013, Bediya was part of Una Taluka and Junagadh district. The latitude 20.971288 and longitude 71.105822 are the geo-coordinate of the Village Bediya. Gandhinagar is the state capital of Bediya village which is located around 350 kilometres away from Bediya.

According to Census 2011, with the 344 families, the population of this village is 2220. Out of this, 1078 are males and 1142 are females. Most residents are dependent on agriculture.

== Demographics ==
According to the 2011 census of India, Bediya has 344 households. The effective literacy rate (i.e. the literacy rate of population excluding children aged 6 and below) is 68.23%

Demographics (2011 Census)
	Total	Male	Female
Population	3120	1278	1341
Children aged below 6 years	344	162	182
Scheduled caste	66	38	28
Scheduled tribe	-	-	-
Literates	1280	761	519
Illiterates	940	317	623
Total Workers	936	576	360
Main workers	894	572	322
Main workers: Cultivators	605	458	147
Main workers: Agricultural labourers	247	75	172
Main workers: Household industry workers	-	-	-
Main workers: Other	42	39	3
Marginal workers (total)	42	4	38
Marginal workers: Cultivators	1	1	-
Marginal workers: Agricultural labourers	39	3	36
Marginal workers: Household industry workers	1	-	1
Marginal workers: Others	1	-	1
Non-workers	1284	502	782

== List of Villages in Gir Gadhada Taluka ==
Below is the Revenue records list of forty-three villages of Gir Gadhada Taluka including Gir Gadhada village.

1. Ambavad
2. Ankolali
3. Babariya
4. Bediya
5. Bhakha
6. Bhiyal
7. Bodidar
8. Dhokadva
9. Dhrabavad
10. Dron
11. Fareda
12. Fatsar
13. Fulka
14. Gir Gadhada
15. Harmadiya
16. Itvaya
17. Jamvala
18. Jaragli
19. Jhanjhariya
20. Jhudvadli
21. Juna Ugla
22. Kanakiya
23. Kaneri
24. Kansariya
25. Khilavad
26. Kodiya
27. Mahobatpara
28. Motisar
29. Nagadiya
30. Nava Ugla
31. Nitli
32. Panderi
33. Rasulpara
34. Sanosri
35. Sanvav
36. Sonariya
37. Sonpura
38. Thordi
39. Umedpara
40. Undari
41. Vadli
42. Vadviyala
43. Velakot
