= Vadviyala =

- Village
- Location in Gujarat, India Vadviyala (India)
- Coordinates: 20.888214°N 70.967131°E
- Country: India
- State: Gujarat
- District: Gir Somnath
- Taluka: Gir Gadhada

Government
  - Type: Panchayati raj (India)
  - Body: Gram panchayat

Area
  - Total: 1,326.77 ha (3,278.5 acres)

Population (2011)
  - Total: 4,298
  - Density: 323.9/km^{2} (839.0/sq mi)
- Sex ratio 2191/2107♂/♀

Languages
  - Official: Gujarati
- Time zone: UTC+5:30 (IST)
- PIN: 362560
- Telephone code: 02875
- Vehicle registration: GJ
- Census code of Vadviyala: 515271
- Nearest city: Gir Gadhada, Una
- Website: girsomnathdp.gujarat.gov.in

Vadviyala is a village / panchayat located in the Gir Gadhada Taluka of Gir Somnath district in Gujarat State, India. Earlier, until August 2013, Vadviyala was part of Una Taluka and Junagadh district. The latitude 20.888214 and longitude 70.967131 are the geo-coordinate of the Village Vadviyala. Gandhinagar is the state capital of Vadviyala village which is located around 400 kilometres away from Vadviyala.

According to Census 2011, with the 807 families, the population of this village is 4298. Out of this, 2191 are males and 2107 are females. Most residents are dependent on agriculture.

== Demographics ==
According to the 2011 census of India, Vadviyala has 807 households. The effective literacy rate (i.e. the literacy rate of population excluding children aged 6 and below) is 73.99%

Demographics (2011 Census)
	Total	Male	Female
Population	4298	2191	2107
Children aged below 6 years	500	261	239
Scheduled caste	522	247	275
Scheduled tribe	6	2	4
Literates	2810	1597	1213
Illiterates	1488	594	894
Total Workers	1587	1276	311
Main workers	1469	1231	238
Main workers: Cultivators	683	591	92
Main workers: Agricultural labourers	432	325	107
Main workers: Household industry workers	4	4	-
Main workers: Other	350	311	39
Marginal workers (total)	118	45	73
Marginal workers: Cultivators	79	29	50
Marginal workers: Agricultural labourers	23	6	17
Marginal workers: Household industry workers	1	-	1
Marginal workers: Others	15	10	5
Non-workers	2711	915	1796

== List of Villages in Gir Gadhada Taluka ==
Below is the Revenue records list of forty-three villages of Gir Gadhada Taluka including Gir Gadhada village.

1. Ambavad
2. Ankolali
3. Babariya
4. Bediya
5. Bhakha
6. Bhiyal
7. Bodidar
8. Dhokadva
9. Dhrabavad
10. Dron
11. Fareda
12. Fatsar
13. Fulka
14. Gir Gadhada
15. Harmadiya
16. Itvaya
17. Jamvala
18. Jaragli
19. Jhanjhariya
20. Jhudvadli
21. Juna Ugla
22. Kanakiya
23. Kaneri
24. Kansariya
25. Khilavad
26. Kodiya
27. Mahobatpara
28. Motisar
29. Nagadiya
30. Nava Ugla
31. Nitli
32. Panderi
33. Rasulpara
34. Sanosri
35. Sanvav
36. Sonariya
37. Sonpura
38. Thordi
39. Umedpara
40. Undari
41. Vadli
42. Vadviyala
43. Velakot
