= Khilavad =

- Village
- Location in Gujarat, India Khilavad (India)
- Coordinates: 20.945653°N 71.00991°E
- Country: India
- State: Gujarat
- District: Gir Somnath
- Taluka: Gir Gadhada

Government
  - Type: Panchayati raj (India)
  - Body: Gram panchayat

Area
  - Total: 1,339.7 ha (3,310 acres)

Population (2011)
  - Total: 2,837
  - Density: 211.8/km^{2} (548.5/sq mi)
- Sex ratio 1438/1399♂/♀

Languages
  - Official: Gujarati
- Time zone: UTC+5:30 (IST)
- PIN: 362565
- Vehicle registration: GJ
- Census code of Khilavad: 515266
- Nearest city: Gir Gadhada, Una
- Website: girsomnathdp.gujarat.gov.in

Khilavad is a village / panchayat located in the Gir Gadhada Taluka of Gir Somnath district in Gujarat State, India. Earlier, until August 2013, Khilavad was part of Una Taluka and Junagadh district. The latitude 20.945653 and longitude 71.00991 are the geo-coordinate of the Village Khilavad. Gandhinagar is the state capital of Khilavad village which is located around 350 kilometres away from Khilavad.

According to Census 2011, with the 533 families, the population of this village is 2837. Out of this, 1438 are males and 1399 are females. Most residents are dependent on agriculture.

== Demographics ==
According to the 2011 census of India, Khilavad has 533 households. The effective literacy rate (i.e. the literacy rate of population excluding children aged 6 and below) is 66.77%

Demographics (2011 Census)
	Total	Male	Female
Population	2837	1438	1399
Children aged below 6 years	321	158	163
Scheduled caste	556	273	283
Scheduled tribe	79	43	36
Literates	1680	994	686
Illiterates	1157	444	713
Total Workers	787	761	26
Main workers	782	758	24
Main workers: Cultivators	334	329	5
Main workers: Agricultural labourers	371	360	11
Main workers: Household industry workers	1	1	-
Main workers: Other	76	68	8
Marginal workers (total)	5	3	2
Marginal workers: Cultivators	1	-	1
Marginal workers: Agricultural labourers	4	3	1
Marginal workers: Household industry workers	-	-	-
Marginal workers: Others	-	-	-
Non-workers	2050	677	1373

== List of Villages in Gir Gadhada Taluka ==
Below is the Revenue records list of forty-three villages of Gir Gadhada Taluka including Gir Gadhada village.

1. Ambavad
2. Ankolali
3. Babariya
4. Bediya
5. Bhakha
6. Bhiyal
7. Bodidar
8. Dhokadva
9. Dhrabavad
10. Dron
11. Fareda
12. Fatsar
13. Fulka
14. Gir Gadhada
15. Harmadiya
16. Itvaya
17. Jamvala
18. Jaragli
19. Jhanjhariya
20. Jhudvadli
21. Juna Ugla
22. Kanakiya
23. Kaneri
24. Kansariya
25. Khilavad
26. Kodiya
27. Mahobatpara
28. Motisar
29. Nagadiya
30. Nava Ugla
31. Nitli
32. Panderi
33. Rasulpara
34. Sanosri
35. Sanvav
36. Sonariya
37. Sonpura
38. Thordi
39. Umedpara
40. Undari
41. Vadli
42. Vadviyala
43. Velakot
