= Bhiyal =

- Village
- Location in Gujarat, India Bhiyal (India)
- Coordinates: 20.854156°N 70.809282°E
- Country: India
- State: Gujarat
- District: Gir Somnath
- Taluka: Gir Gadhada

Government
  - Type: Panchayati raj (India)
  - Body: Gram panchayat

Area
  - Total: 291.92 ha (721.4 acres)

Population (2011)
  - Total: 646
  - Density: 221/km^{2} (573/sq mi)
- Sex ratio 331/315♂/♀

Languages
  - Official: Gujarati
- Time zone: UTC+5:30 (IST)
- PIN: 362560
- Vehicle registration: GJ
- Census code of Bhiyal: 515295
- Nearest city: Gir Gadhada, Una
- Website: girsomnathdp.gujarat.gov.in

Bhiyal is a village / panchayat located in the Gir Gadhada Taluka of Gir Somnath district in Gujarat State, India. Earlier, until August 2013, Bhiyal was part of Una Taluka and Junagadh district. The latitude 20.854156 and longitude 70.809282 are the geo-coordinate of the Village Bhiyal. Gandhinagar is the state capital of Bhiyal village which is located around 400 kilometres away from Bhiyal.

According to Census 2011, with the 115 families, the population of this village is 646. Out of this, 331 are males and 315 are females. Most residents are dependent on agriculture.

== Demographics ==
According to the 2011 census of India, Bhiyal has 115 households. The effective literacy rate (i.e. the literacy rate of population excluding children aged 6 and below) is 71.6%

Demographics (2011 Census)
	Total	Male	Female
Population	646	331	315
Children aged below 6 years	79	40	39
Scheduled caste	208	113	95
Scheduled tribe	-	-	-
Literates	406	238	168
Illiterates	240	93	147
Total Workers	293	184	109
Main workers	233	176	57
Main workers: Cultivators	79	78	1
Main workers: Agricultural labourers	84	70	14
Main workers: Household industry workers	-	-	-
Main workers: Other	70	28	42
Marginal workers (total)	60	8	52
Marginal workers: Cultivators	1	1	-
Marginal workers: Agricultural labourers	50	4	46
Marginal workers: Household industry workers	-	-	-
Marginal workers: Others	9	3	6
Non-workers	353	147	206

== List of villages in Gir Gadhada Taluka ==
Below is the Revenue records list of forty-three villages of Gir Gadhada Taluka including Gir Gadhada village.

1. Ambavad
2. Ankolali
3. Babariya
4. Bediya
5. Bhakha
6. Bhiyal
7. Bodidar
8. Dhokadva
9. Dhrabavad
10. Dron
11. Fareda
12. Fatsar
13. Fulka
14. Gir Gadhada
15. Harmadiya
16. Itvaya
17. Jamvala
18. Jaragli
19. Jhanjhariya
20. Jhudvadli
21. Juna Ugla
22. Kanakiya
23. Kaneri
24. Kansariya
25. Khilavad
26. Kodiya
27. Mahobatpara
28. Motisar
29. Nagadiya
30. Nava Ugla
31. Nitli
32. Panderi
33. Rasulpara
34. Sanosri
35. Sanvav
36. Sonariya
37. Sonpura
38. Thordi
39. Umedpara
40. Undari
41. Vadli
42. Vadviyala
43. Velakot
