= Fatsar =

- Village
- Location in Gujarat, India Fatsar (India)
- Coordinates: 20.927667°N 70.987533°E
- Country: India
- State: Gujarat
- District: Gir Somnath
- Taluka: Gir Gadhada

Government
  - Type: Panchayati raj (India)
  - Body: Gram panchayat

Area
  - Total: 1,279.8 ha (3,162 acres)

Population (2011)
  - Total: 3,590
  - Density: 281/km^{2} (727/sq mi)
- Sex ratio 1862/1728♂/♀

Languages
  - Official: Gujarati
- Time zone: UTC+5:30 (IST)
- PIN: 362530
- Vehicle registration: GJ
- Census code of Fatsar: 515267
- Nearest city: Gir Gadhada, Una
- Website: girsomnathdp.gujarat.gov.in

Fatsar is a village / panchayat located in the Gir Gadhada Taluka of Gir Somnath district in Gujarat State, India. Earlier, until August 2013, Fatsar was part of Una Taluka and Junagadh district. The latitude 20.927667 and longitude 70.987533 are the geo-coordinate of the Village Fatsar. Gandhinagar is the state capital of Fatsar village which is located around 350 kilometres away from Fatsar.

According to Census 2011, with the 670 families, the population of this village is 3590. Out of this, 1862 are males and 1728 are females. Most residents are dependent on agriculture.

== Demographics ==
According to the 2011 census of India, Fatsar has 670 households. The effective literacy rate (i.e. the literacy rate of population excluding children aged 6 and below) is 73.56%

Demographics (2011 Census)
	Total	Male	Female
Population	3590	1862	1728
Children aged below 6 years	368	207	161
Scheduled caste	167	86	81
Scheduled tribe	12	6	6
Literates	2370	1340	1030
Illiterates	1220	522	698
Total Workers	1260	1069	191
Main workers	1042	945	97
Main workers: Cultivators	426	415	11
Main workers: Agricultural labourers	383	319	64
Main workers: Household industry workers	4	4	-
Main workers: Other	229	207	22
Marginal workers (total)	218	124	94
Marginal workers: Cultivators	31	7	24
Marginal workers: Agricultural labourers	157	90	67
Marginal workers: Household industry workers	1	-	1
Marginal workers: Others	29	27	2
Non-workers	2330	793	1537

== List of Villages in Gir Gadhada Taluka ==
Below is the Revenue records list of forty-three villages of Gir Gadhada Taluka including Gir Gadhada village.

1. Ambavad
2. Ankolali
3. Babariya
4. Bediya
5. Bhakha
6. Bhiyal
7. Bodidar
8. Dhokadva
9. Dhrabavad
10. Dron
11. Fareda
12. Fatsar
13. Fulka
14. Gir Gadhada
15. Harmadiya
16. Itvaya
17. Jamvala
18. Jaragli
19. Jhanjhariya
20. Jhudvadli
21. Juna Ugla
22. Kanakiya
23. Kaneri
24. Kansariya
25. Khilavad
26. Kodiya
27. Mahobatpara
28. Motisar
29. Nagadiya
30. Nava Ugla
31. Nitli
32. Panderi
33. Rasulpara
34. Sanosri
35. Sanvav
36. Sonariya
37. Sonpura
38. Thordi
39. Umedpara
40. Undari
41. Vadli
42. Vadviyala
43. Velakot
