= Kodiya (Gir Gadhada) =

- Village
- Location in Gujarat, India Kodiya (India)
- Coordinates: 20.972618°N 70.951495°E
- Country: India
- State: Gujarat
- District: Gir Somnath
- Taluka: Gir Gadhada

Government
  - Type: Panchayati raj (India)
  - Body: Gram panchayat

Area
  - Total: 987.53 ha (2,440.2 acres)

Population (2011)
  - Total: 3,067
  - Density: 310.6/km^{2} (804.4/sq mi)
- Sex ratio 1591/1476♂/♀

Languages
  - Official: Gujarati
- Time zone: UTC+5:30 (IST)
- PIN: 362530
- Vehicle registration: GJ
- Census code of Kodiya: 515249
- Nearest city: Gir Gadhada, Una
- Website: girsomnathdp.gujarat.gov.in

Kodiya is a village / panchayat located in the Gir Gadhada Taluka of Gir Somnath district in Gujarat, India. Earlier, until August 2013, Kodiya was part of Una Taluka and Junagadh district. The latitude 20.972618 and longitude 70.951495 are the geo-coordinate of the Village Kodiya. Gandhinagar is the state capital of Kodiya village which is located around 375 kilometres away from Kodiya.

According to Census 2011, with the 551 families, the population of this village is 3067. Out of this, 1591 are males and 1476 are females. Most residents are dependent on agriculture.

== Demographics ==
According to the 2011 census of India, Kodiya has 551 households. The effective literacy rate (i.e. the literacy rate of population excluding children aged 6 and below) is 57.8%

Demographics (2011 Census)
	Total	Male	Female
Population	3067	1591	1476
Children aged below 6 years	498	260	238
Scheduled caste	23	10	13
Scheduled tribe	42	17	25
Literates	1485	904	581
Illiterates	1582	687	895
Total Workers	1616	970	646
Main workers	1332	963	369
Main workers: Cultivators	464	370	94
Main workers: Agricultural labourers	686	423	263
Main workers: Household industry workers	2	1	1
Main workers: Other	180	169	11
Marginal workers (total)	284	7	277
Marginal workers: Cultivators	107	3	104
Marginal workers: Agricultural labourers	163	2	161
Marginal workers: Household industry workers	-	-	-
Marginal workers: Others	14	2	12
Non-workers	1451	621	830

== List of Villages in Gir Gadhada Taluka ==
Below is the Revenue records list of forty-three villages of Gir Gadhada Taluka including Gir Gadhada village.

1. Ambavad
2. Ankolali
3. Babariya
4. Bediya
5. Bhakha
6. Bhiyal
7. Bodidar
8. Dhokadva
9. Dhrabavad
10. Dron
11. Fareda
12. Fatsar
13. Fulka
14. Gir Gadhada
15. Harmadiya
16. Itvaya
17. Jamvala
18. Jaragli
19. Jhanjhariya
20. Jhudvadli
21. Juna Ugla
22. Kanakiya
23. Kaneri
24. Kansariya
25. Khilavad
26. Kodiya
27. Mahobatpara
28. Motisar
29. Nagadiya
30. Nava Ugla
31. Nitli
32. Panderi
33. Rasulpara
34. Sanosri
35. Sanvav
36. Sonariya
37. Sonpura
38. Thordi
39. Umedpara
40. Undari
41. Vadli
42. Vadviyala
43. Velakot
