= Vadli =

- Village
- Location in Gujarat, India Vadli (India)
- Coordinates: 21.011335°N 71.081876°E
- Country: India
- State: Gujarat
- District: Gir Somnath
- Taluka: Gir Gadhada

Government
  - Type: Panchayati raj (India)
  - Body: Gram panchayat

Area
  - Total: 682.78 ha (1,687.2 acres)

Population (2011)
  - Total: 1,031
  - Density: 151.0/km^{2} (391.1/sq mi)
- Sex ratio 537/494♂/♀

Languages
  - Official: Gujarati
- Time zone: UTC+5:30 (IST)
- PIN: 362530
- Vehicle registration: GJ
- Census code of Vadli: 515226
- Nearest city: Gir Gadhada, Una
- Website: girsomnathdp.gujarat.gov.in

Vadli is a village / panchayat located in the Gir Gadhada Taluka of Gir Somnath district in Gujarat State, India. Earlier, until August 2013, Vadli was part of Una Taluka and Junagadh district. The latitude 21.011335 and longitude 71.081876 are the geo-coordinate of the Village Vadli. Gandhinagar is the state capital of Vadli village which is located around 400 kilometres away from Vadli.

According to Census 2011, with the 192 families, the population of this village is 1031. Out of this, 537 are males and 494 are females. Most residents are dependent on agriculture.

== Demographics ==
According to the 2011 census of India, Vadli has 192 households. The effective literacy rate (i.e. the literacy rate of population excluding children aged 6 and below) is 69.13%

Demographics (2011 Census)
	Total	Male	Female
Population	1031	537	494
Children aged below 6 years	124	75	49
Scheduled caste	24	13	11
Scheduled tribe	-	-	-
Literates	627	359	268
Illiterates	404	178	226
Total Workers	406	297	109
Main workers	358	291	67
Main workers: Cultivators	159	140	19
Main workers: Agricultural labourers	171	131	40
Main workers: Household industry workers	3	3	-
Main workers: Other	25	17	8
Marginal workers (total)	48	6	42
Marginal workers: Cultivators	2	2	-
Marginal workers: Agricultural labourers	2	-	2
Marginal workers: Household industry workers	3	2	1
Marginal workers: Others	41	2	39
Non-workers	625	240	385

== List of villages in Gir Gadhada Taluka ==
Below is the Revenue records list of forty-three villages of Gir Gadhada Taluka including Gir Gadhada village.

1. Ambavad
2. Ankolali
3. Babariya
4. Bediya
5. Bhakha
6. Bhiyal
7. Bodidar
8. Dhokadva
9. Dhrabavad
10. Dron
11. Fareda
12. Fatsar
13. Fulka
14. Gir Gadhada
15. Harmadiya
16. Itvaya
17. Jamvala
18. Jaragli
19. Jhanjhariya
20. Jhudvadli
21. Juna Ugla
22. Kanakiya
23. Kaneri
24. Kansariya
25. Khilavad
26. Kodiya
27. Mahobatpara
28. Motisar
29. Nagadiya
30. Nava Ugla
31. Nitli
32. Panderi
33. Rasulpara
34. Sanosri
35. Sanvav
36. Sonariya
37. Sonpura
38. Thordi
39. Umedpara
40. Undari
41. Vadli
42. Vadviyala
43. Velakot
