= Ambavad =

- Village
- Location in Gujarat, India Ambavad (India)
- Coordinates: 20.837349°N 70.923194°E
- Country: India
- State: Gujarat
- District: Gir Somnath
- Taluka: Gir Gadhada

Government
  - Type: Panchayati raj (India)
  - Body: Gram panchayat

Area
  - Total: 385.01 ha (951.4 acres)

Population (2011)
  - Total: 869
  - Density: 226/km^{2} (585/sq mi)
- Sex ratio 446/423♂/♀

Languages
  - Official: Gujarati
- Time zone: UTC+5:30 (IST)
- PIN: 362560
- Vehicle registration: GJ
- Census code of Ambavad: 515315
- Nearest city: Gir Gadhada, Una
- Website: girsomnathdp.gujarat.gov.in

Ambavad is a village / panchayat located in the Gir Gadhada Taluka of Gir Somnath district in Gujarat State, India. Earlier, until August 2013, Ambavad was part of Una Taluka and Junagadh district. The latitude 20.837349 and longitude 70.923194 are the geo-coordinate of the Village Ambavad.

According to the 2011 Census, the village has a population of 869, comprising 163 families. Out of this, 446 are males and 423 are females. Most residents are dependent on agriculture.

== Demographics ==
According to the 2011 census of India, Ambavad has 163 households. The effective literacy rate (i.e. the literacy rate of the population excluding children aged 6 and below) is 80.58%

Demographics (2011 Census)
	Total	Male	Female
Population	869	446	423
Children aged below 6 years	81	51	30
Scheduled caste	-	-	-
Scheduled tribe	10	6	4
Literates	635	349	286
Illiterates	234	97	137
Total Workers	496	277	219
Main workers	283	264	19
Main workers: Cultivators	212	202	10
Main workers: Agricultural labourers	14	11	3
Main workers: Household industry workers	-	-	-
Main workers: Other	57	51	6
Marginal workers (total)	213	13	200
Marginal workers: Cultivators	200	13	187
Marginal workers: Agricultural labourers	10	-	10
Marginal workers: Household industry workers	-	-	-
Marginal workers: Others	3	-	3
Non-workers	373	169	204

== List of villages in Gir Gadhada Taluka ==
Below is the list of forty-three villages in Gir Gadhada Taluka, including Gir Gadhada village.

1. Ambavad
2. Ankolali
3. Babariya
4. Bediya
5. Bhakha
6. Bhiyal
7. Bodidar
8. Dhokadva
9. Dhrabavad
10. Dron
11. Fareda
12. Fatsar
13. Fulka
14. Gir Gadhada
15. Harmadiya
16. Itvaya
17. Jamvala
18. Jaragli
19. Jhanjhariya
20. Jhudvadli
21. Juna Ugla
22. Kanakiya
23. Kaneri
24. Kansariya
25. Khilavad
26. Kodiya
27. Mahobatpara
28. Motisar
29. Nagadiya
30. Nava Ugla
31. Nitli
32. Panderi
33. Rasulpara
34. Sanosri
35. Sanvav
36. Sonariya
37. Sonpura
38. Thordi
39. Umedpara
40. Undari
41. Vadli
42. Vadviyala
43. Velakot
