= Gir Gadhada taluka =

Gir Gadhada Taluka Girgadhada Taluka, Gir-Gaddha Taluka
- taluka
- Location in Gujarat, India Gir Gadhada Taluka (India)
- Coordinates: 20.92°N 70.92°E
- Country: India
- State: Gujarat
- District: Gir Somnath

Area
  - Total: 15 km^{2} (5.8 sq mi)
- Elevation: 0 m (0 ft)

Population (2001)
  - Total: 15,600

Languages
  - Official: Gujarati,
- Time zone: UTC+5:30 (IST)
- PIN: 362 530
- Vehicle registration: GJ
- Website: gujaratindia.com

Gir Gadhada Taluka is a taluka of Gir Somnath district in the state of Gujarat, India. Before 2013 the area was part of Una Taluka, but it became a taluka in its own right with the creation of Gir Somnath District in August of that year. Gir Gadhada Taluka has population around 15,600. The village of Gir Gadhada became its administrative headquarters.

== Villages ==
Revenue records list forty-two villages for Gir Gadhada Taluka.

1. Ambavad
2. Ankolali
3. Babariya
4. Bediya
5. Bhakha
6. Bhiyal
7. Bodidar
8. Dhokadva
9. Dhrabavad
10. Dron
11. Fareda
12. Fatsar
13. Fulka
14. Gir Gadhada
15. Harmadiya
16. JASHADHAR GIR
17. Itvaya
18. Jamvala
19. Jaragli
20. Jhanjhariya
21. Jhudvadli
22. Juna Ugla
23. Kanakiya
24. Kaneri
25. Kansariya
26. Khilavad
27. Kodiya
28. Mahobatpara
29. Motisar
30. Nagadiya
31. Nava Ugla
32. Nitli
33. Panderi
34. Rasulpara
35. Sanosri
36. Sanvav
37. Sonariya
38. Sonpura
39. Thordi
40. Umedpara
41. Undari
42. Vadli
43. Vadviyala
44. Velakot

== Tourist Places Near By Gir Gadhada ==
Diu
Nagoa Beach
Gupt Prayag
Sasan Gir
Kankai
Banej
Tapkeshwar
Machhundri Dam
Zamjir Waterfall
Somnath
Bhalka Tirth
Tulsishyam
Dron – Machhundri Check Dam
Junagadh

== How to reach Gir Gadhada ==
By Train

Gir Gadhara Rail Way Station. Distance from

- Somnath to Girgadhada: 76 km
- Junagadh to Girgadhada: 110 km
- Rajkot to Girgadhada: 171 km

By Bus

- Junagadh to Girgadhada: 119 km
- Diu to Girgadhada: 37 km
- Una to Girgadhada: 18 km
- Veraval to Girgadhada: 78 km
- Talala to Girgadhada: 78 km
- Kodinar to Girgadhada: 45 km

== Available Network Service Provider ==
- Idea (3G)
- Airtel
- Bsnl
- Vodafone
- Videocon
- Uninor
- Tata Docomo
- Tata Indicom
- Virgin Mobile
- Jio (4g)
