= Kankai (disambiguation) =

kankai is a Hindu holi place but it may also refer to:

- Kankai, a Hindu holi place
- Kankai Municipality, a Municipality in Nepal
- Kankai River, a river
