= Ankolwadi gir =

Ankolvadi Gir
- Village
- Location in Gujarat, India Ankolvadi Gir (India)
- Coordinates: 21.0397171°N 70.6564588°E
- Country: India
- State: Gujarat
- District: Gir Somnath
- Taluka: Talala, Gujarat

Population (2018)
  - Total: 15,000
  - ethnicity: 90.0% Indian; 10.00% NRI

Languages
  - Official: Gujarati, Hindi, English
- Time zone: UTC+5:30 (IST)
- Postal code: 362140
- Vehicle registration: GJ-32

Ankolwadi Gir is a village in Talala, Gir Somnath district, in the west of Gujarat, India.

As of 2018, it had a population near 15,000. The village is located on a hill. The people of Ankolwadi Gir are mostly connected to mango farming. Ankolwadi Gir is near Jungle of Gir, and therefore lions and leopards come to the village often.
