= Gir Gadhada =

- Town
- Location in Gujarat, India Gir Gadhada (India)
- Coordinates: 20.923121°N 70.921362°E
- Country: India
- State: Gujarat
- District: Gir Somnath
- Taluka: Gir Gadhada

Government
  - Type: Panchayati raj (India)
  - Body: Gram panchayat

Area
  - Total: 2,144.11 ha (5,298.2 acres)

Population (2011)
  - Total: 9,631
  - Density: 449.2/km^{2} (1,163/sq mi)
- Sex ratio 4781/4850♂/♀

Languages
  - Official: Gujarati, Hindi
- Time zone: UTC+5:30 (IST)
- PIN: 362530
- Vehicle registration: GJ
- Census code of Gir Gadhada: 515255
- Nearest city: Somnath, Una
- Website: girsomnathdp.gujarat.gov.in

Gir Gadhada is a town in Gir Somnath district in the state of Gujarat, India. Before 2013, it was a town of Una Taluka in Junagadh District, Now it has become the administrative headquarters for 42 villages when that taluka was created as part of the new Gir Somnath District in August of that year. Newly built BAPS Shree Swaminarayana Mandir is a popular place of worship and spiritual activities here. There is another older Swaminarayan mandir nearby. Other temples in the town are Shree Khodiyar Mandir, Shree ramji Mandir, Hanuman Ji mandir, Shiv mandir and Ganpati temple

== Demographics ==
According to the 2011 census of India, Gir Gadhada has 1849 households. The effective literacy rate (i.e. the literacy rate of population excluding children aged 6 and below) is 71.28%

Demographics (2011 Census)
	Total	Male	Female
Population	9631	4781	4850
Children aged below 6 years	1226	615	611
Scheduled caste	872	441	431
Scheduled tribe	9	6	3
Literates	5991	3342	2649
Illiterates	3640	1439	2201
Total Workers	4070	2786	1284
Main workers	3486	2679	807
Main workers: Cultivators	733	604	129
Main workers: Agricultural labourers	1483	926	557
Main workers: Household industry workers	26	20	6
Main workers: Other	1244	1129	115
Marginal workers (total)	584	107	477
Marginal workers: Cultivators	245	15	230
Marginal workers: Agricultural labourers	269	54	215
Marginal workers: Household industry workers	-	-	-
Marginal workers: Others	70	38	32
Non-workers	5561	1995	3566

== List of Villages in Gir Gadhada Taluka ==
Below is the Revenue records list of forty-three villages of Gir Gadhada Taluka including Gir Gadhada village.

1. Ambavad
2. Ankolali
3. Babariya
4. Bediya
5. Bhakha
6. Bhiyal
7. Bodidar
8. Dhokadva
9. Dhrabavad
10. Dron
11. Fareda
12. Fatsar
13. Fulka
14. Gir Gadhada
15. Harmadiya
16. Itvaya
17. Jamvala
18. Jaragli
19. Jhanjhariya
20. Jhudvadli
21. Juna Ugla
22. Kanakiya
23. Kaneri
24. Kansariya
25. Khilavad
26. Kodiya
27. Mahobatpara
28. Motisar
29. Nagadiya
30. Nava Ugla
31. Nitli
32. Panderi
33. Rasulpara
34. Sanosri
35. mota samdhiyala
36. Sonpura
37. Thordi
38. Umedpara
39. Undari
40. Vadli
41. Vadviyala
42. Velakot

== See also ==
- Gir Gadhada Taluka

mota samdhiyala
