= Kankai =

Kankai Kankai Mataji, Banej Kankai
- village
- Country: India
- State: Gujarat
- District: Junagadh

Languages
  - Official: Gujarati, Hindi
- Time zone: UTC+5:30 (IST)
- Vehicle registration: GJ-
- Nearest city: Veraval, Gujarat

Kankai is a village and a Hindu holy site located within Gir National Park in the Junagadh district of the Saurashtra region in the Indian state of Gujarat.

== Location ==
Located inside Gir National Park, Gujarat, India.

== History ==
The Indian mega-epic Mahabharata's famous character Arjuna comes alive here so this place is famous because of him. Once traveling through this forest, Pandavas gets thirsty and Arjuna uses his bow to discover water from the earth. There is a Mahadev temple here called 'Banej'.

== Temple and Surroundings ==
The main temple is "Shri Kankeshwari Mataji" also known as "Shri Kankai Mataji". Mataji is principal goddess (કુળદૅવી) to many castes in India; Like Vaishya Suthar (Vadhia and chavda), Gurjar Suthar(Panchasara), Bhawsar (bahekar), Uneval Brahmins, Bhadreshwara-Vanza, Borkhetaria-Vanza Vaishya and some other castes. A smaller temple for Bhudarjee Dada, Mataji's brother is erected behind the main temple. This is at a walking distance from the main temple. Shingavada (શિગૌદા) river flows on one side of the temple.

Sometimes visitors can see lions near the temple or near the river as it's an open habitat for lions, second only to Africa.

== Accommodations ==
Every year thousands of devotees and tourist visits this temple. The temple also provides meals for devotees and tourist. Being located in the middle of Gir Sanctuary, as per norms, tourists have to exit the sanctuary before sunset.

== Nearby Places ==
Banej is a major nearby tourist location, around 15 km from Shree Kankai Temple. This is a very famous place surrounded by trees, wild animals and nature. Tulsishyam is another religious place nearby also often visited.

== Transportation ==
There is a bus from Junagadh every day that leaves at 8am, stays one hour at the temple, and departs on the return journey at 9:45am.

By road: Gir National Park is 60 km from Junagadh, the most common base for making a visit, and 360 km from Ahmedabad. The main centre is at Sasan Gir that has a forest guest house maintained by the Forest Department, opposite the railway station. There are hotels and guest-houses at Sasan as well as nearby places. One can stay with nature by using these hotels. The temple can be accessed via private vehicles. It is preferred that local taxi should be hired to visit the place.

By rail: One can travel by rail to Junagadh from Ahmedabad or Veraval (Somnath) and then take a 65 km road trip on bus or taxi to Sasan Gir.

By Air: The nearest airport is Rajkot but it is not well connected to major airports of India, hence the suitable Airport is Ahmedabad. One can take train or drive from Ahmedabad. The climate in Kankai is mild on most days.
