= Thordi =

Thordi (Gir)
- Village
- Location in Gujarat, India Thordi (Gir) (India)
- Coordinates: 20.973820°N 70.833509°E
- Country: India
- State: Gujarat
- District: Gir Somnath
- Taluka: Gir Gadhada

Government
  - Type: Panchayati raj (India)
  - Body: Gram panchayat

Population (2011)
  - Total: 1,670
- Sex ratio 830/840 ♂/♀

Languages
  - Official: Gujarati
- Time zone: UTC+5:30 (IST)
- PIN: 362530
- Telephone code: 02875
- Vehicle registration: GJ
- Census code of Thordi: 515379
- Nearest city: Gir Gadhada, Una
- Website: girsomnathdp.gujarat.gov.in

Thordi is a village / panchayat located in the Gir Gadhada Taluka of Gir Somnath district in Gujarat State, India. Earlier, until August 2013, Thordi was part of Una Taluka and Junagadh district. The latitude 20.973820 and longitude 70.833509 are the geo-coordinate of the Village Thordi. Gandhinagar is the state capital of Thordi village which is located around 400 kilometres away from Thordi.

According to Census 2011, with the 303 families, the population of this village is 1670. Out of this, 830 are males and 840 are females. Most residents are dependent on agriculture.

== Demographics ==
According to the 2011 census of India, Thordi has 303 households. The effective literacy rate (i.e. the literacy rate of population excluding children aged 6 and below) is 69.74%.

Demographics (2011 Census)
	Total	Male	Female
Population	1670	830	840
Children aged below 6 years	232	129	103
Scheduled caste	36	17	19
Scheduled tribe	143	69	74
Literates	1003	545	458
Illiterates	667	285	382
Total Workers	656	446	210
Main workers	439	415	24
Main workers: Cultivators	147	144	3
Main workers: Agricultural labourers	239	224	15
Main workers: Household industry workers	3	2	1
Main workers: Other	50	45	5
Marginal workers (total)	217	31	186
Marginal workers: Cultivators	4	3	1
Marginal workers: Agricultural labourers	199	16	183
Marginal workers: Household industry workers	-	-	-
Marginal workers: Others	14	12	2
Non-workers	1014	384	630

== List of villages in Gir Gadhada taluka ==
Villages: Revenue records list forty-three villages for Gir Gadhada Taluka.

1. Ambavad
2. Ankolali
3. Babariya
4. Bediya
5. Bhakha
6. Bhiyal
7. Bodidar
8. Dhokadva
9. Dhrabavad
10. Dron
11. Fareda
12. Fatsar
13. Fulka
14. Gir Gadhada
15. Harmadiya
16. Itvaya
17. Jamvala
18. Janjariya
19. Jaragli
20. Jhudvadli
21. Juna Ugla
22. Kanakiya
23. Kaneri
24. Kansariya
25. Khilavad
26. Kodiya
27. Mahobatpara
28. Motisar
29. Nagadiya
30. Nitli
31. Panderi
32. Rasulpara
33. Sanosri
34. Sanvav
35. Sonariya
36. Sonpura
37. Thordi
38. Ugla
39. Umedpara
40. Undarari
41. Vadli
42. Vadviyala
43. Velakot

== Notable people ==
Tapomurti Sadguru Shastri Shri Narayanprasaddasji Swami (Girdhar Radadiya) was a well known Sadhu/Swami of Swaminarayan Sampraday who had belonged to the village. Currently, Nagjibhai Radadiya (Swami's nephew) and his family are living in this village.
