= Bhakha =

Bhakha (Gir)
- Village
- Location in Gujarat, India Bhakha (Gir) (India)
- Coordinates: 20.820009°N 71.044327°E
- Country: India
- State: Gujarat
- District: Gir Somnath
- Taluka: Gir Gadhada

Government
  - Type: Panchayati raj (India)
  - Body: Gram panchayat

Population (2011)
  - Total: 1,215
- Sex ratio 606/609 ♂/♀

Languages
  - Official: Gujarati
- Time zone: UTC+5:30 (IST)
- PIN: 362530
- Telephone code: 02875
- Vehicle registration: GJ
- Census code of Thordi: 515378
- Nearest city: Gir Gadhada, Una
- Website: girsomnathdp.gujarat.gov.in

Bhakha, also known as Bhakha (Gir) and Gir Bhakha, is a village / panchayat located in the Gir Gadhada Taluka of Gir Somnath district in Gujarat State, India. Earlier, until August 2013, Bhakha was part of Una Taluka and Junagadh district. The latitude 20.820009 and longitude 71.044327 are the geo-coordinate of the Village Thordi. Gandhinagar is the state capital of Thordi village which is located around 400 kilometres away from Thordi.

According to Census 2011, with the 227 families, the population of this village is 1215. Out of this, 606 are males and 609 are females. Most residents are dependent on agriculture.

== Demographics ==
According to the 2011 census of India, Bhakha has 227 households. The effective literacy rate (i.e. the literacy rate of population excluding children aged 6 and below) is 73.26%.

Demographics (2011 Census)
	Total	Male	Female
Population	1215	606	609
Children aged below 6 years	164	85	79
Scheduled caste	151	71	80
Scheduled tribe	18	6	12
Literates	770	423	347
Illiterates	485	183	262
Total Workers	474	353	121
Main workers	470	350	120
Main workers: Cultivators	108	105	3
Main workers: Agricultural labourers	245	136	109
Main workers: Household industry workers	-	-	-
Main workers: Other	117	109	8
Marginal workers (total)	4	3	1
Marginal workers: Cultivators	-	-	-
Marginal workers: Agricultural labourers	1	-	1
Marginal workers: Household industry workers	-	-	-
Marginal workers: Others	3	3	-
Non-workers	741	253	488
