= Una, Gujarat =

Una
- Town
- Location in Gujarat, India Una (India)
- Coordinates: 20.82°N 71.03°E
- Country: India
- State: Gujarat
- District: Gir Somnath
- Elevation: 14 m (46 ft)

Population (2011)
  - Total: 58,528

Languages
  - Official: Gujarati
- Time zone: UTC+5:30 (IST)
- PIN: 362 560
- Vehicle registration: GJ 32
- Website: gujaratindia.com

Una is a town and a municipality in Gir Somnath district of the Saurashtra region in the state of Gujarat, India.

== Geography ==
Una is located on the bank of the Machchundri river. It has an average elevation of 14 metres (46 feet). Kodinar is located to the west, and Diu is to the south. Una has the highest number of villages of all the Talukas in Gujarat state.

== Demographics ==
As per the 2011 India census, Una had a population of 58,528. Males constitute 51% of the population and females 49%. In Una, 14% of the population is under 6 years of age.

Una has an average literacy rate of 67%, higher than the national average of 59.5%: male literacy is 74%, and female literacy is 59%.

Una is the biggest taluka in Gir Somnath District in terms of the number of villages.

Some villages are: Nathal, Amodra, Khapat, Ratad, Chachakvad, Delwada, Nathej, Vyajpur, Rameshvar, Sultanpur, Gangada, Samter, Garaal, Motha, Sanakhada, Sanjvapar, Simar, Navabandar, Kajradi, Bhacha, Umej, Gundala, Kesariya, Kob, Tad, Paldi, Olwan, Vansoj, Untwada, Varsingpur, Simasi, Kansari, Kalapan, Gangada, Khatriwada, Anjar, etc. Since the town is a purchase hub for surrounding villages, it offers a variety of goods that may not be available in other towns.

== Transportation ==
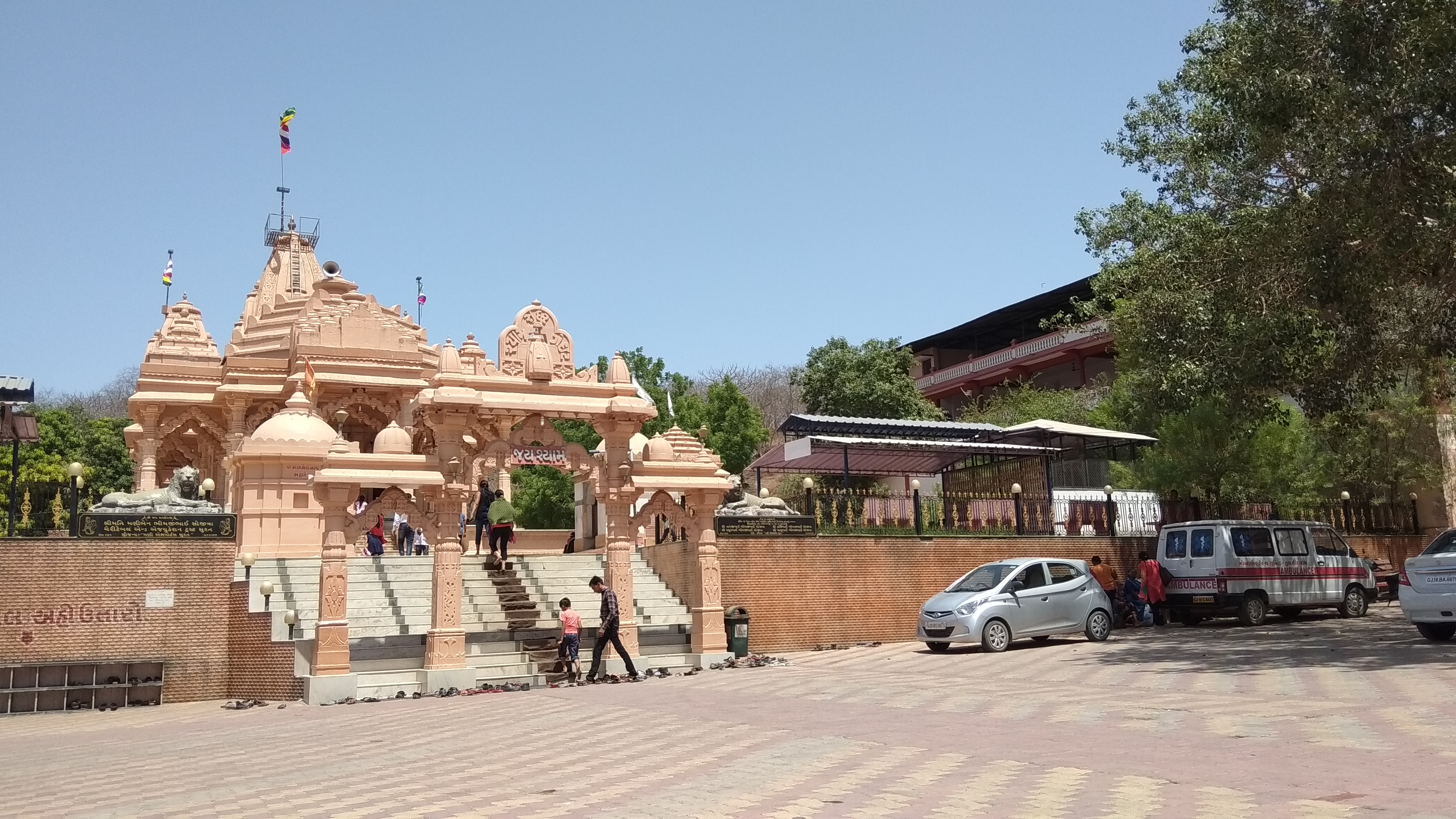
Tulsishyam Temple, a temple near Una.

Una is situated on National Highway No. 8 E. This highway connects Bhavnagar with Veraval. It is also on NH 51.

The city is well connected to other major cities of Gujarat, such as Ahmedabad, Vadodara, Surat, Rajkot, Jamnagar, Junagadh, and Bhavnagar, as well as Mumbai, by bus services operated by state-owned transport corporations and private operators. Daily bus services are available for Mumbai, operated by both state-owned transport corporations and private bus operators.

Good transportation services are available for Diu, as it is a famous and popular tourist destination. Diu is the nearest city with air transportation and is 15 km away from Una.

Una is also connected with Veraval and Junagadh by train service.

== See also ==
- Gujarat anti-Dalit Human Rights abuses
