= List of Rajya Sabha members from Punjab =

The list of current and past Rajya Sabha members from the Punjab. The state elects 7 members for a term of 6 years. The members are indirectly elected by the state legislators, as done since 1952.

== Current members ==
#	Name	Portrait	Party	Term start	Term end
1	Ashok Mittal		BJP	10-Apr-2022	09-Apr-2028
2	Raghav Chadha		BJP	10-Apr-2022	09-Apr-2028
3	Sandeep Pathak		BJP	10-Apr-2022	09-Apr-2028
4	Harbhajan Singh		BJP	10-Apr-2022	09-Apr-2028
5	Rajinder Gupta		BJP	24-Oct-2025	09-Apr-2028
6	Vikramjit Singh Sahney		BJP	05-Jul-2022	04-Jul-2028
7	Balbir Singh Seechewal		AAP	05-Jul-2022	04-Jul-2028

== List of former members of the Rajya Sabha from Punjab (since 1952) ==
- ^ - Incumbent Member of Parliament

Name	Term start	Left office (Note: The date when the legislator left office, whether due to the expiration of their term or any other reason.)	Statutory end of term (Note: The date on which their term of office did or would have expired if serving their full term.)	Party	Reason for leaving office
Anup Singh	3 April 1952	2 April 1954		Indian National Congress	
Anup Singh	3 April 1954	2 April 1960		Indian National Congress	
Anup Singh	3 April 1962	22 November 1962	2 April 1964	Indian National Congress	Disqualified
Anup Singh	3 April 1964	28 January 1969	2 April 1970	Indian National Congress	Death
Diwan Chaman Lall	3 April 1952	2 April 1956		Indian National Congress	
Diwan Chaman Lall	3 April 1956	2 April 1962		Indian National Congress	
Diwan Chaman Lall	3 April 1962	2 April 1968		Indian National Congress	
Darshan Singh Pheruman	3 April 1952	2 April 1956		Indian National Congress	
Darshan Singh Pheruman	3 April 1956	2 April 1958		Indian National Congress	
Darshan Singh Pheruman	3 April 1958	2 April 1964		Swatantra Party	
Guraj Singh Dhillon	3 April 1952	2 April 1956		Shiromani Akali Dal	
Hans Raj Raizada	3 April 1952	29 August 1952	2 April 1954	Indian National Congress	Resigned
Hans Raj Raizada	3 April 1953	2 April 1958		Indian National Congress	
Mukund Lal Puri	3 April 1952	11 January 1953	2 April 1954	Indian National Congress	Death
M. H. S. Singh	3 April 1952	2 April 1954		Indian National Congress	
M. H. S. Singh	3 April 1954	2 April 1960		Indian National Congress	
Swaran Singh	7 October 1952	18 March 1957	6 October 1958	Indian National Congress	Elected to Lok Sabha
Udham Singh Nagoke	3 April 1952	2 April 1954		Indian National Congress	
Udham Singh Nagoke	3 April 1954	2 April 1960		Indian National Congress	
Zail Singh	3 April 1956	10 March 1962	2 April 1962	Indian National Congress	Resigned after being elected to Punjab legislative assembly
Amrit Kaur	20 April 1957	2 April 1958		Indian National Congress	
Amrit Kaur	3 April 1958	6 February 1964	2 April 1964	Indian National Congress	Death
Jagan Nath Kaushal	3 April 1958	2 April 1964		Indian National Congress	
Jugal Kishore	20 April 1957	2 April 1962		Indian National Congress	
Madho Ram Sharma	3 April 1958	2 April 1964		Indian National Congress	
Bansi Lal	3 April 1960	2 April 1966		Indian National Congress	
Bansi Lal	3 April 1976	7 January 1980	2 April 1982	Independent	Elected to Lok Sabha
Mohan Singh	3 April 1960	2 April 1966		Indian National Congress	
Mohan Singh	10 April 1972	April 1968		Indian National Congress	
Neki Ram	3 April 1960	2 April 1966		Indian National Congress	
Raghbir Singh Panjhazari	3 April 1960	2 April 1966		Indian National Congress	
Raghbir Singh Panjhazari	3 April 1966	2 April 1972		Indian National Congress	
Abdul Ghani Dar	23 November 1962	23 February 1967	22 November 1968	Independent	Elected to Lok Sabha
Surjit Singh Atwal	3 April 1962	2 April 1968		Indian National Congress	
Inder Kumar Gujral	3 April 1964	2 April 1970		Indian National Congress	
Inder Kumar Gujral	3 April 1970	2 April 1976		Indian National Congress	
Mohinder Kaur	3 April 1964	24 February 1967	2 April 1970	Indian National Congress	Elected to Lok Sabha
Uttam Singh Dugal	3 April 1964	20 April 1968	2 April 1970	Independent	Death
Narinder Singh Brar	3 April 1966	2 April 1972		Shiromani Akali Dal	
Salig Ram	3 April 1966	19 March 1972	2 April 1972	Indian National Congress	Resigned after being elected to Himachal Pradesh legislative assembly
Bhupinder Singh Brar	3 April 1967	2 April 1970		Independent	
Gurmukh Singh Musafir	3 April 1968	2 April 1974		Indian National Congress	
Gurmukh Singh Musafir	3 April 1974	18 January 1976	2 April 1980	Indian National Congress	Death
Rattan Lal Jain	3 April 1968	2 April 1974		Indian National Congress	
Gurcharan Singh Tohra	28 March 1969	April 1970		Shiromani Akali Dal	
Gurcharan Singh Tohra	3 April 1970	2 April 1976		Shiromani Akali Dal	
Gurcharan Singh Tohra	3 April 1980	2 April 1982		Shiromani Akali Dal	
Gurcharan Singh Tohra	3 April 1982	2 April 1988		Shiromani Akali Dal	
Gurcharan Singh Tohra	10 April 1998	1 April 2004	9 April 2004	Shiromani Akali Dal	Death
Harcharan Singh Duggal	28 March 1969	2 April 1970		Independent	
Bhupinder Singh	3 April 1970	2 April 1976		Shiromani Akali Dal	
Bhupinder Singh	13 October 1976	9 April 1978		Indian National Congress	
Sita Devi	10 April 1972	23 March 1974	9 April 1978	Indian National Congress	Death
Jagjit Singh Anand	3 April 1974	2 April 1980		Communist Party of India	
Niranjan Singh Talib	16 July 1974	28 May 1976	9 April 1978	Indian National Congress	Death
Ambika Soni	30 March 1976	2 April 1980		Indian National Congress	
Ambika Soni	5 July 2004	4 July 2010		Indian National Congress	
Ambika Soni	5 July 2010	4 July 2016		Indian National Congress	
Ambika Soni	5 July 2016	4 July 2022		Indian National Congress	

Name	Party	Term start	Term end	Term	Notes
Rajinder Gupta	BJP	17-Oct-2025	09-Apr-2028	1	bye-election due to resignation of Sanjeev Arora
Vikramjit Singh Sahney	BJP	05-Jul-2022	04-Jul-2028	1	
Balbir Singh Seechewal	AAP	05-Jul-2022	04-Jul-2028	1	
Raghav Chadha	BJP	10-Apr-2022	09-Apr-2028	1	
Ashok Mittal	BJP	10-Apr-2022	09-Apr-2028	1	
Sanjeev Arora	AAP	10-Apr-2022	01-Jul-2025	1	elected to Ludhiana West Assembly
Sandeep Pathak	BJP	10-Apr-2022	09-Apr-2028	1	
Harbhajan Singh	BJP	10-Apr-2022	09-Apr-2028	1	
Balwinder Singh Bhunder	SAD	05-Jul-2016	04-Jul-2022	3	
Ambika Soni	INC	05-Jul-2016	04-Jul-2022	4	
Sukhdev Singh Dhindsa	SAD	10-Apr-2016	09-Apr-2022	3	
Naresh Gujral	SAD	10-Apr-2016	09-Apr-2022	3	
Shwait Malik	BJP	10-Apr-2016	09-Apr-2022	1	
Partap Singh Bajwa	INC	10-Apr-2016	09-Apr-2022	1	
Shamsher Singh Dullo	INC	10-Apr-2016	09-Apr-2022	1	
Balwinder Singh Bhunder	SAD	05-Jul-2010	04-Jul-2016	2	
Ambika Soni	INC	05-Jul-2010	04-Jul-2016	3	
Sukhdev Singh Dhindsa	SAD	10-Apr-2010	09-Apr-2016	2	
Naresh Gujral	SAD	10-Apr-2010	09-Apr-2016	2	
Avinash Rai Khanna	BJP	10-Apr-2010	09-Apr-2016	1	
Ashwani Kumar	INC	10-Apr-2010	09-Apr-2016	3	
M. S. Gill	INC	10-Apr-2010	09-Apr-2016	1	
Naresh Gujral	SAD	22-Mar-2007	09-Apr-2010	1	bye-election due to death of Sukhbans Kaur Bhinder
Ambika Soni	INC	05-Jul-2004	04-Jul-2010	2	
Raj Mohinder Singh Majitha	SAD	05-Jul-2004	04-Jul-2010	2	
M. S. Gill	INC	10-Apr-2004	09-Apr-2010	1	
Dharam Pal Sabharwal	INC	10-Apr-2004	09-Apr-2010	1	
Ashwani Kumar	INC	10-Apr-2004	09-Apr-2010	2	
Sukhbans Kaur Bhinder	INC	10-Apr-2004	15-Dec-2006	1	death
Varinder Singh Bajwa	SAD	10-Apr-2004	09-Apr-2010	1	
Ashwani Kumar	INC	21-May-2002	09-Apr-2004	1	bye-election due to resignation of Balwinder Singh Bhunder
Gurcharan Kaur	BJP	07-Jun-2001	04-Jul-2004	1	bye-election due to resignation of Raj Mohinder Singh Majitha
Sukhbir Singh Badal	SAD	26-Feb-2001	09-Apr-2004		bye-election due to disqualification of Barjinder Singh Hamdard
Sukhdev Singh Libra	SAD	05-Jul-1998	13-May-2004	1	elected to Ropar Lok Sabha
Raj Mohinder Singh Majitha	SAD	05-Jul-1998	01-Mar-2001	1	elected to Majitha Assembly
Gurcharan Singh Tohra	SAD	10-Apr-1998	09-Apr-2004	5	
Sukhdev Singh Dhindsa	SAD	10-Apr-1998	09-Apr-2004	1	
Balwinder Singh Bhunder	SAD	10-Apr-1998	07-Mar-2002	1	elected to Sardulgarh Assembly
Lajpat Rai	BJP	10-Apr-1998	09-Apr-2004	1	
Barjinder Singh Hamdard	Ind	10-Apr-1998	21-Dec-2000	1	disqualified
Mohinder Singh Kalyan	INC	05-Jul-1992	04-Jul-1998	1	
Virendra Kataria	INC	05-Jul-1992	04-Jul-1998	1	
Balbir Singh	INC	10-Apr-1992	09-Apr-1998	1	
Iqbal Singh	INC	10-Apr-1992	09-Apr-1998	1	
Jagir Singh	INC	10-Apr-1992	09-Apr-1998	1	
Venod Sharma	INC	10-Apr-1992	09-Apr-1998	1	
Surinder Kumar Singla	INC	10-Apr-1992	09-Apr-1998	1	
Jagjit Singh Aurora	SAD	05-Jul-1986	04-Jul-1992	1	
Harvendra Singh Hanspal	INC	05-Jul-1986	04-Jul-1992	2	
Pawan Kumar Bansal	INC	10-Apr-1984	09-Apr-1990	1	
Darbara Singh	INC	10-Apr-1984	11-Mar-1990	1	death
Amarjit Kaur	INC	03-Apr-1982	02-Apr-1988	2	
Sat Pal Mittal	INC	03-Apr-1982	02-Apr-1988	2	
Gurcharan Singh Tohra	SAD	03-Apr-1982	02-Apr-1988	4	
Harvendra Singh Hanspal	INC	05-Jul-1980	04-Jul-1986	1	
Jagdev Singh Talwandi	SAD	05-Jul-1980	04-Jul-1986	1	
Gurcharan Singh Tohra	SAD	09-May-1980	02-Apr-1982	3	bye-election due to resignation of Bansi Lal
Rajinder Kaur	SAD	10-Apr-1978	09-Apr-1984	1	
Harkishan Singh Surjeet	CPM	10-Apr-1978	09-Apr-1984	1	
Sat Pal Mittal	INC	03-Apr-1976	02-Apr-1982	1	
Amarjit Kaur	INC	03-Apr-1976	02-Apr-1982	1	
Bansi Lal	INC	03-Apr-1976	07-Jan-1980	1	elected to Bhiwani Lok Sabha
Raghbir Singh Gill	INC	03-Apr-1976	09-May-1980	1	disqualified
Amrit Kaur	INC	20-Apr-1957	02-Apr-1958	1	bye - resignation of Swaran Singh
Raghbir Singh Panjhazari	INC	01-Nov-1956	02-Apr-1960	1	RS member of PEPSU till 01-Nov-1956
Joginder Singh Mann	INC	01-Nov-1956	02-Apr-1958	1	RS member of PEPSU till 01-Nov-1956
Hans Raj Raizada	INC	17-Mar-1953	02-Apr-1958	1	bye - death of Mukund Lal Puri
Swaran Singh	INC	03-Apr-1952	18-Mar-1957	1	elected to Jalandhar Lok Sabha
Mukund Lal Puri	INC	03-Apr-1952	11-Jan-1953	1	death
Guraj Singh Dhillon	SAD	03-Apr-1952	02-April-1958	1	
Diwan Chaman Lall	INC	03-Apr-1952	02-April-1956	1	
Darshan Singh Pheruman	INC	03-Apr-1952	02-April-1956	1	
Udham Singh Nagoke	INC	03-Apr-1952	02-Apr-1954	1	
M.H.S. Nihal Singh	INC	03-Apr-1952	02-Apr-1954	1	
Anup Singh	INC	03-Apr-1952	02-Apr-1954	1	

== List of members of the Rajya Sabha from the Patiala and East Punjab States Union (1952-1956) ==
Name	Party	Term start	Term end	Term	Notes
Raghbir Singh Panjhazari	INC	03-Apr-1954	01-Nov-1956	1	RS member of Punjab from 01-Nov-1956 onwards
Jagan Nath Kaushal	INC	03-Apr-1952	02-April-1958	1	
Joginder Singh Mann	INC	03-Apr-1952	01-Nov-1956	1	RS member of Punjab from 01-Nov-1956 onwards
Kartar Singh	INC	03-Apr-1952	02-Oct-1953	1	death

== See also ==
- List of Lok Sabha members from Punjab
