= 2004 Indian general election in Punjab =

- 10 May 2004

All 13 Punjab seats in the Lok Sabha
- Turnout: 61.60%
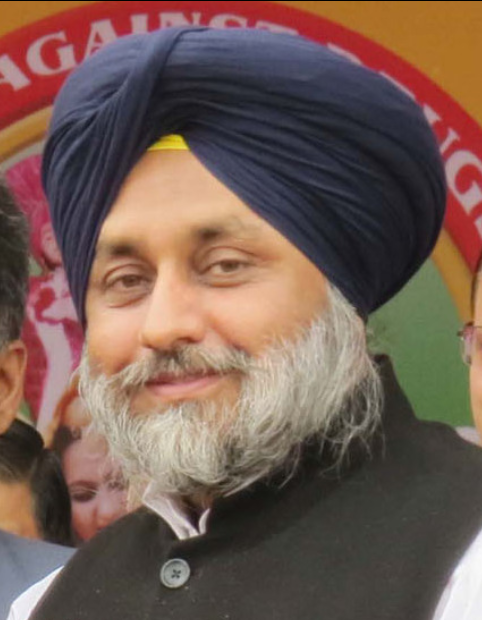

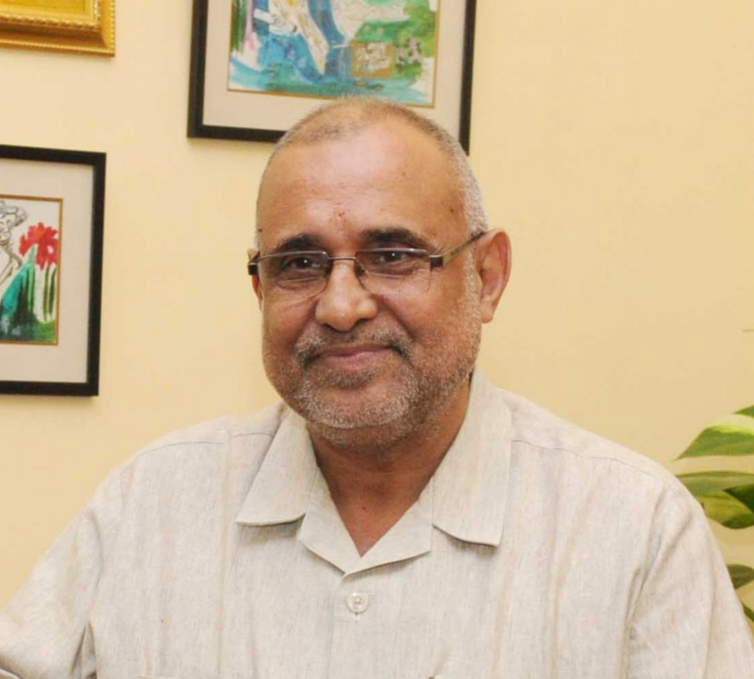

	First party	Second party	Third party
Leader	Sukhbir Singh Badal	Avinash Rai Khanna	Harvendra Singh Hanspal
Party	SAD	BJP	INC
Alliance	NDA	NDA	INC+ (post-poll UPA)
Leader's seat	Faridkot (won)	Hoshiarpur (won)	Did not contest
Seats before	2	1	8
Seats won	8	3	2
Seat change	▲6	▲2	▼6
Percentage	34.28%	10.48%	34.17%
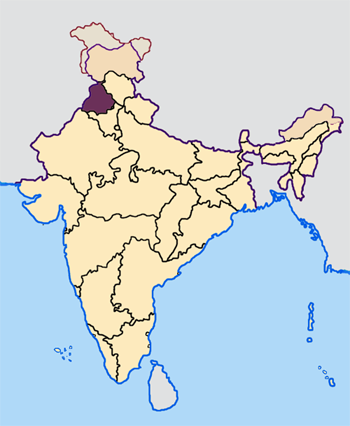
Prime Minister before election
Atal Bihari Vajpayee
BJP
Prime Minister after election
Manmohan Singh
INC

The 2004 Indian general election in Punjab was held on 13 seats of Lok Sabha in April to May 2004 and elections were held in the 4th Phase on 10th May 2004 for all the 13 constituencies. The members were elected for the 14th Lok Sabha.

== Parties and alliances ==
Party/Alliance Name		Flag	Electoral symbol	Leader	Seats contested
NDA	Shiromani Akali Dal			Sukhbir Singh Badal	10
NDA	Bharatiya Janata Party			Avinash Rai Khanna	3
UPA	Indian National Congress		Hand	Harvendra Singh Hanspal	11
UPA	Communist Party of India (Marxist)		Hand		1
UPA	Communist Party of India		Hand		1

== List of Candidates ==
Constituency		NDA		UPA	
#	Name	Party	Candidate	Party	Candidate
1	Gurdaspur	BJP	Vinod Khanna	INC	Sukhbans Kaur Bhinder
2	Amritsar	BJP	Navjot Singh Sidhu	INC	R. L. Bhatia
3	Tarn Taran	SAD	Rattan Singh Ajnala	INC	Sukhbinder Singh Sarkaria
4	Jullundur	SAD	Naresh Gujral	INC	Rana Gurjeet Singh
5	Phillaur (SC)	SAD	Charanjit Singh Atwal	INC	Santosh Chowdhary
6	Hoshiarpur	BJP	Avinash Rai Khanna	CPI(M)	Darshan Singh Mattu
7	Ropar (SC)	SAD	Sukhdev Singh Libra	INC	Shamsher Singh Dullo
8	Patiala	SAD	Kanwaljit Singh	INC	Preneet Kaur
9	Ludhiana	SAD	Sharanjit Singh Dhillon	INC	Manish Tewari
10	Sangrur	SAD	Sukhdev Singh Dhindsa	INC	Arvind Khanna
11	Bhatinda (SC)	SAD	Paramjit Kaur Gulshan	CPI	Kaushalya Chaman Bhaura
12	Faridkot	SAD	Sukhbir Singh Badal	INC	Karan Kaur Brar
13	Ferozepur	SAD	Zora Singh Maan	INC	Jagmeet Singh Brar

== Results by Party/Alliance ==
Alliance/ Party		Popular vote			Seats		
Alliance/ Party		Votes	%	±pp	Contested	Won	+/−
NDA	SAD	35,06,681	34.28	▲5.69	10	8	▲6
NDA	BJP	10,71,650	10.48	▲1.32	3	3	▲2
NDA	Total	45,78,331	44.76	Steady	13	11	Steady
UPA	INC	34,95,187	34.17	▼4.27	11	2	▼6
UPA	CPI	2,60,752	2.55	▼1.19	1	0	▼1
UPA	CPI(M)	1,85,444	1.81	▼0.37	1	0	Steady
UPA	Total	39,41,383	38.53	Steady	13	2	Steady
BSP		7,84,454	7.67	▲3.83	13	0	Steady
SAD(A)		3,87,682	3.79	▲0.38	6	0	▼1
LBP		1,87,787	1.84	Steady	1	0	Steady
Others		67,827	0.67	Steady	26	0	Steady
IND		2,81,608	2.75	▲0.30	70	0	Steady
Total		1,02,29,072	100%	-	142	13	-

== Results ==
In the election, the Shiromani Akali Dal became the biggest party by winning 8 seats, with Bharatiya Janata Party at 3 seats and Indian National Congress winning 2 seats.

Constituency		Winner				Runner Up				Margin	%
#	Name	Candidate	Party	Votes	%	Candidate	Party	Votes	%	Margin	%
1	Gurdaspur	Vinod Khanna	BJP	387,612	49.32	Sukhbans Bhinder	INC	362,629	46.15	24,983	3.18
2	Amritsar	Navjot Sidhu	BJP	394,223	55.38	R. L. Bhatia	INC	284,691	39.99	109,532	15.39
3	Tarn Taran	Rattan Ajnala	SAD	364,646	50.83	Sukhbinder Sarkaria	INC	308,252	42.97	56,394	7.86
4	Jullundur	Rana Gurjeet Singh	INC	344,619	46.46	Naresh Gujral	SAD	311,156	41.95	33,463	4.51
5	Phillaur (SC)	Charanjit Singh Atwal	SAD	324,512	44.91	Santosh Chowdhary	INC	225,628	31.23	98,884	13.69
6	Hoshiarpur	Avinash Rai Khanna	BJP	289,815	44.20	Darshan Singh Mattu	CPM	185,444	28.28	104,371	15.92
7	Ropar (SC)	Sukhdev Singh Libra	SAD	347,631	43.99	Shamsher Singh Dullo	INC	313,994	39.73	33,637	4.26
8	Patiala	Preneet Kaur	INC	409,917	46.89	Kanwaljit Singh	SAD	386,250	44.19	23,667	2.71
9	Ludhiana	Sharanjit Dhillon	SAD	329,234	37.85	Manish Tewari	INC	299,694	34.45	29,540	3.40
10	Sangrur	Sukhdev Singh Dhindsa	SAD	286,828	34.28	Arvind Khanna	INC	259,551	31.02	27,277	3.26
11	Bhatinda (SC)	Paramjit Kaur Gulshan	SAD	323,394	42.37	Kaushalya Bhaura	CPI	260,752	34.17	62,642	8.21
12	Faridkot	Sukhbir Singh Badal	SAD	475,928	53.29	Karan Kaur Brar	INC	340,649	38.14	135,279	15.15
13	Ferozepur	Zora Singh Maan	SAD	357,102	41.21	Jagmeet Singh Brar	INC	345,563	39.87	11,539	1.33

== Post-election Union Council of Ministers from Punjab ==
#	Name	Constituency	Designation	Department	From	To	Party
1	Ambika Soni	Rajya Sabha (Punjab)	Cabinet Minister	Minister of Culture; Minister of Tourism	29 January 2006	22 May 2009	INC
2	M. S. Gill	Rajya Sabha (Punjab)	MoS (I/C)	Minister of Youth Affairs and Sports	6 April 2008	22 May 2009	INC
3	Ashwani Kumar	Rajya Sabha (Punjab)	MoS	Ministry of Commerce and Industry	29 January 2006	22 May 2009	INC

== Assembly segments wise lead of parties ==
Party	Assembly segments		
Party	2002	2004	2007
Shiromani Akali Dal	41	62	48
Indian National Congress	62	29	44
Bharatiya Janata Party	3	22	19
Shiromani Akali Dal (Amritsar)	0	2	0
Communist Party of India (Marxist)	0	1	0
Communist Party of India	2	1	0
Total	117		
