= Ashok Mittal =

Indian politician (born 1964)

Ashok Kumar Mittal

Member of Parliament, Rajya Sabha
- Incumbent
- Assumed office 10 April 2022
- Preceded by: Shamsher Singh Dullo
- Constituency: Punjab

Chancellor of Lovely Professional University
- In office 2005

Personal details
- Born: 10 September 1964 (age 62) Punjab, India
- Party: Bharatiya Janata Party (2026–present)
- Other political affiliations: Aam Aadmi Party (2022–2026)
- Spouse: Rashmi Mittal
- Children: Srishti Mittal, Pratham Mittal
- Education: Guru Nanak Dev University
- Profession: Businessman

Ashok Kumar Mittal (born 10 September 1964) is an Indian businessman and politician who has been a member of the Rajya Sabha from Punjab since 2022. He is the founder and chancellor of Lovely Professional University.

Mittal was a member of the Aam Aadmi Party (AAP) from 2022 until 2026. In April 2026, he left the AAP and joined the Bharatiya Janata Party (BJP) along with six other AAP Rajya Sabha members. The Rajya Sabha Chairman subsequently accepted the merger of the seven members with the BJP, and the Rajya Sabha records were updated accordingly.

== Early life and education ==
Mittal was born on 10 September 1964 in Jalandhar Cantonment. He graduated in law from Guru Nanak Dev University in Amritsar.

In 2022, he received an honorary doctorate from Atal Bihari Vajpayee Vishwavidyalaya at its third convocation.

Ashok Mittal is married to Rashmi Mittal and has two children. They have two children, Srishti Mittal and Pratham Mittal.

== Business career ==
Mittal joined his family's sweets business, Lovely Sweets, in the 1980s. The family subsequently diversified into the automobile business, establishing Lovely Autos in 1991. In 2000, the family entered the education sector with the establishment of the Lovely Institute of Management.

The family subsequently established Lovely Professional University in 2005, with Mittal serving as its founder and chancellor.

== Political career ==
=== Rajya Sabha ===
Mittal entered electoral politics in 2022. He was nominated by the Aam Aadmi Party as its candidate for the Rajya Sabha from Punjab in the 2022 Indian Rajya Sabha elections, along with Harbhajan Singh, Raghav Chadha, Sandeep Pathak and Sanjeev Arora. He was elected unopposed on 24 March 2022 and began his term on 10 April 2022.

From 2022, Mittal served on parliamentary committees including the Parliamentary Standing Committee on External Affairs. In September 2024, he was appointed to the Parliamentary Standing Committee on Finance.

=== AAP deputy leader and switch to BJP ===
On 2 April 2026, the Aam Aadmi Party appointed Mittal as its deputy leader in the Rajya Sabha, replacing Raghav Chadha. The change was communicated by the party to the Rajya Sabha Secretariat.

On 15 April 2026, the Enforcement Directorate conducted searches at premises linked to Mittal and the Lovely Group in Punjab and elsewhere as part of an investigation under the Foreign Exchange Management Act. Reporting on the searches described the investigation as involving business entities linked to Mittal; no finding of wrongdoing is implied by the searches themselves.

On 24 April 2026, Mittal resigned from the AAP and joined the BJP along with Raghav Chadha, Sandeep Pathak, Harbhajan Singh, Swati Maliwal, Vikramjit Singh Sahney and Rajinder Gupta.

The AAP subsequently sought the disqualification of the seven MPs under the Tenth Schedule of the Constitution. On 27 April 2026, the Rajya Sabha Chairman accepted the merger of the seven MPs with the BJP, and the parliamentary records subsequently reflected them as members of the BJP.

Rajya Sabha
Preceded by List	Member of Parliament in Rajya Sabha for Punjab; 2022–2028	Incumbent
