= Abdul Ghani Dar =

Indian politician and author

Member of Parliament, Lok Sabha
- In office 4 March 1967 – 27 December 1970
- Preceded by: Gajraj Singh Yadav
- Succeeded by: Tayyab Husain
- Constituency: Gurgaon

Member of Parliament, Rajya Sabha
- In office 23 November 1962 – 23 February 1967
- Preceded by: Dr. Anup Singh
- Succeeded by: Bhupinder Singh Brar
- Constituency: Punjab

Member of the Punjab Legislative Assembly
- In office 3 May 1952 – 1 March 1962
- Preceded by: Assembly established
- Succeeded by: Khurshid Ahmed
- Constituency: Nuh

Personal details
- Born: 14 October 1907
- Died: 11 December 1989 (aged 82)
- Party: Independent
- Other political affiliations: Indian National Congress
- Spouse: Shamshad (m. 1965)
- Parent: Sheik Jiwan Dar (father)

Abdul Ghani Dar (14 October 1907 – 11 December 1989) was an Indian politician and author. He was a Member of the Rajya Sabha from Punjab from 23 November 1962 to 23 February 1967 and also a Member of the 4th Lok Sabha from the Gurgaon Lok Sabha constituency from 1967 to 1971 being an Independent candidate. He was a member of the Punjab Legislative Assembly from Nuh Assembly constituency since 1952 till he was elected to the Rajya Sabha being associated with the Indian National Congress.

He was formerly associated with Indian National Congress while publishing his book Congress Khatre Men.

== Early life ==
Abdul Ghani Dar was born on 14 October 1907 in Amritsar, British India to Sheik Jiwan Dar. He was educated at Islamia High School in Amritsar, where he also served as Chairman of the Students' Union. He later became actively involved in the Indian independence movement and political affairs.

== Social Activism ==
Throughout his life, Abdul Ghani was deeply involved in social causes. He advocated for a ban on cow slaughter, promoted Hindu-Muslim unity, and worked towards national and emotional integration. He was also dedicated to the upliftment of rural areas and marginalized communities, including the Harijans (Dalits). He was a staunch opponent of corruption and actively fought for the promotion of national languages, especially Hindi and Urdu.

== Personal life ==
Abdul Ghani Dar married Shamshaad in 1965 and they had one daughter.

== Books published ==
1. Tiranga (Tricolor)
2. Shaheed Yamin Dar
3. Swadeshi
4. Congress Khatre Men
5. Tikton-Ka-Chakkar
6. Misery of Punjab
7. Historic Enquiry after Warren Hastings
8. Eye-opener
