= Jaisalmer House =

Former residence of the Maharawal of Jaisalmer in New Delhi

Coordinates: 28.607928°N 77.225239°E

Jaisalmer House is the former residence of the Maharawal of Jaisalmer in New Delhi. It is part of Lutyens Bungalow Zone (LBZ). It was commissioned in 1936 by Maharawal Jawahir Singh of Jaisalmer as his New Delhi residence and completed in 1938 to a design by Master, Sathe and Bhuta. The Art Deco style building features a simple rectangular plan with curved corner towers, a central courtyard and characteristic Streamline modern elements like continuous eyebrow sun‑shades and porthole windows. After independence, it was acquired by the Government of India and now serves as the headquarters of the Ministry of Law and Justice.

== History ==
Jaisalmer House was commissioned in 1936 by Maharawal Jawahir Singh of Jaisalmer as his New Delhi residence within Lutyens Bungalow Zone and was completed in 1938 by contractor Sobha Singh to a design by Master, Sathe and Bhuta. After Indian independence, the Government of India acquired the property and it now serves as the headquarters of the Department of Justice under the Ministry of Law and Justice.

== Architecture ==
Jaisalmer House is located on Mansingh Road alongside other princely residences such as Darbhanga House and Kapurthala House, and was designed in 1936 by Master, Sathe and Bhuta. Its plan is a simple rectangle, enlivened by bulging cylindrical towers at the front corners that house curved staircases, and organized around a sunlit central courtyard accessed through an extended entrance porch aligned on the building's principal axis. Balconies are detailed with sleek metal handrails reminiscent of 1930s ocean liners, while circular porthole windows punctuate the façades and patterned jaali screens introduce filtered light into interior spaces. A continuous concrete "eyebrow| sun-shade wraps the building's perimeter, accentuating its horizontal lines and curved profiles, a key hallmark of the Streamline Moderne variant of Art Deco. The flat roof projections over the central pavilion and corner towers provide a crisp, geometric counterpoint to the sweeping overhangs below, creating a dynamic interplay of horizontals and curves across the building’s elevation.
