= Brahm Yadav =

Indian politician

Delhi
- Constituency: Rajinder Nagar

Personal details
- Born: 4 May 1951 Todapur Delhi
- Died: 14 January 2024 (aged 72)
- Party: Indian National Congress
- Occupation: Politician

Brahm Yadav was an Indian politician and member of the Indian National Congress. He was former General Secretary of Delhi Pradesh Congress Committee and former president of the Delhi Pradesh Youth Congress (1983-1990). He was also former chairman of the Delhi Agriculture Marketing Board and vice chairman of the Confederation of State Agricultural Marketing Boards.

Sh. Brahm Yadav was appointed Chairman of Delhi Agricultural Marketing Board on 30 May 2007. He comes from a farmer family of Delhi.

Sh. Brahm Yadav has also been elected as Sr. Vice-chairman of COSAMB (Confederation of State Agricultural Marketing Boards), a body of all the State Agricultural Marketing Boards constituted to formulate policies and suggestions for upgrading marketing infrastructure to meet the emerging challenges of global competition.

Sh. Brahm Yadav worked as president of Delhi Pradesh Youth Congress from 1983 to 1990, as Municipal Councilor for a period of seven years, and as General Secretary of Delhi Pradesh Congress Committee under the Presidency of Chaudhary Prem Singh, Late Sh. Deep Chand Bandhu, Smt. Sheila Dixit and Sh. Subhash Chopra. Sh. Yadav as a Member of the OBC Commission made efforts to include many Jats, Raya Rajputs, and Rajbhars as OBCs in the list for Delhi which were not included previously. He was also Chairman of the Rajdhani College, University of Delhi.

== Education ==
He graduated high school from Ramjas School in 1969, New Delhi.

== Political career ==
Was elected municipal councilor from 1983 to 1987 and was deputy chairman standing committee.first time contested in 1993 delhi state assembly as Congress candidate and lost from a very narrow margin.Yadav independently participated in the Delhi state assembly elections in 1998 from Rajendra Nagar. In 2015, he again contested the Delhi state assembly election being an Indian National Congress party candidate from Rajinder Nagar.
