= Rajinder Nagar Assembly constituency =

Constituency of the Delhi legislative assembly in India

Coordinates: 28.639°N 77.181°E

Rajinder Nagar
- Constituency No. 39 for the Delhi Legislative Assembly

Constituency details
- Country: India
- Region: North India
- State: Delhi
- District: New Delhi
- Lok Sabha constituency: New Delhi
- Total electors: 1,77,867
- Reservation: None

Member of Legislative Assembly
- 8th Delhi Legislative Assembly
- Incumbent Umang Bajaj
- Party: Bharatiya Janata Party
- Elected year: 2025

Rajinder Nagar Assembly constituency is one of the seventy Delhi assembly constituencies of Delhi and includes the neighborhood of Rajendra Nagar, Delhi. Rajinder Nagar assembly constituency is a part of New Delhi (Lok Sabha constituency).

== Members of the Legislative Assembly ==
Year	Member	Party
1993	Puran Chand Yogi	Bharatiya Janata Party
1998	Puran Chand Yogi	Bharatiya Janata Party
2003	Puran Chand Yogi	Bharatiya Janata Party
2008	Ramakant Goswami	Indian National Congress
2013	R. P. Singh	Bharatiya Janata Party
2015	Vijender Garg Vijay	Aam Aadmi Party
2020	Raghav Chadha	Aam Aadmi Party
2022^	Durgesh Pathak	Aam Aadmi Party
2025	Umang Bajaj	Bharatiya Janata Party

^ by-poll

== Election results ==
=== 2025 ===
Delhi Assembly, 2025: Rajinder Nagar
Party	Candidate	Votes	%	±%
BJP	Umang Bajaj	46,671	48.01	
AAP	Durgesh Pathak	45,440	46.74	
INC	Vineet Yadav	4,015	4.13	
NOTA	None of the Above	571	0.59	
Majority		1,231	1.27	
Turnout		97,211		
BJP gain from AAP		Swing		

=== 2022 by-election ===
Delhi Assembly by-election, 2022: Rajinder Nagar
Party	Candidate	Votes	%	±%
AAP	Durgesh Pathak	40,319	55.76	−1.30
BJP	Rajesh Bhatia	28,581	39.92	+2.22
INC	Prem Lata	2,014	2.79	−1.01
NOTA	None of the above	546	0.76	
Majority		11,555	15.84	−3.52
Turnout		71,892	43.75	−14.75
Registered electors		1,77,867		
AAP hold		Swing	-1.30	

=== 2020 ===
Delhi Assembly elections, 2020: Rajinder Nagar
Party	Candidate	Votes	%	±%
AAP	Raghav Chadha	59,135	57.06	+3.67
BJP	R. P. Singh	39,077	37.70	+1.76
INC	Rocky Tuseed	4,041	4.60	−4.00
NOTA	None of the above	467	0.45	+0.04
Majority		20,058	19.36	+1.91
Turnout		1,03,675	58.50	−9.80
Registered electors		1,77,867		
AAP hold		Swing	+3.67	

=== 2015 ===
Delhi Assembly elections, 2015: Rajinder Nagar
Party	Candidate	Votes	%	±%
AAP	Vijender Garg Vijay	61,354	53.39	+19.37
BJP	R. P. Singh	41,303	35.94	+0.12
INC	Brahm Yadav	8,971	7.80	−13.08
BSP	Prem Singh	1,467	1.27	−3.54
NOTA	None of the above	472	0.41	−0.14
Majority		20,051	17.45	+15.65
Turnout		1,14,981	62.99	
Registered electors				
AAP gain from BJP		Swing	+19.37	

=== 2013 ===
Delhi Assembly elections, 2013: Rajinder Nagar
Party	Candidate	Votes	%	±%
BJP	R. P. Singh	35,713	35.82	+2.54
AAP	Vijender Garg Vijay	33,917	34.02	
INC	Rama Kant Goswami	20,817	20.88	−19.90
BSP	Amanpreet Singh	4,794	4.81	−17.21
Independent	Vinod Bhatt	1,720	1.73	
Independent	Ram Kumar Tanwar	406	0.41	
JD(U)	Vinod Kumar Shrivastava	358	0.36	
Independent	Vijay Gupta	264	0.26	
Socialist Party (India)	Md Shoaib	201	0.20	
RPIE	Sadhna	160	0.16	
DMDK	P D Thanappan	152	0.15	
ABP	Swadesh Ohri	149	0.15	
NDP	Ajay Kumar Kalia	142	0.14	
PRC	Rajani Chauhan	134	0.13	
RJP	Sanno	123	0.12	
Independent	Neelam Mahajan	103	0.10	
NOTA	None	552	0.55	
Majority		1,796	1.80	−5.70
Turnout		99,817	60.54	
BJP gain from INC		Swing	+2.54	

=== 2008 ===
Delhi Assembly elections, 2008: Rajinder Nagar
Party	Candidate	Votes	%	±%
INC	Rama Kant Goswami	29,394	40.78	+0.63
BJP	Asha Yogi	23,988	33.28	−8.56
BSP	Amanpreet Singh	15,871	22.02	
NCP	Bhagwan Das	1,344	1.86	
Independent	Sanjay Sherawat	540	0.75	
RSBP	Chhote Lal	261	0.36	
Independent	Mahender Ram	215	0.30	
IDP	Sanjeev Kumar	130	0.18	
SP	Sanjay Kumar	123	0.17	
Independent	August Dagar	91	0.13	
JKNPP	Bhoj Kumar	68	0.09	
ABHM	Jitender Singh	52	0.07	−0.13
Majority		5,406	7.50	+5.81
Turnout		72,077	52.2	+1.56
INC gain from BJP		Swing	+0.63	

=== 2003 ===
Delhi Assembly elections, 2003: Rajinder Nagar
Party	Candidate	Votes	%	±%
BJP	Puran Chand Tyagi	22,069	41.84	+4.21
INC	Raj Kumar Kohli	21,178	40.15	+18.46
Independent	Trilok Chand Sharma	8,514	16.14	
Independent	P L Premi	365	0.69	
IJP	Usha Singh	314	0.60	
JD(U)	Promila Sharma	197	0.37	
ABHM	Pawan Kumar Gupta	106	0.20	
Majority		891	1.69	−0.77
Turnout		52,743	50.64	+5.65
BJP hold		Swing	+4.21	

=== 1998 ===
Delhi Assembly elections, 1998: Rajinder Nagar
Party	Candidate	Votes	%	±%
BJP	Puran Chand Tyagi	21,150	37.63	−10.12
Independent	Brahm Yadav	19,767	35.17	
INC	Ram Ashish Singh	12,189	21.69	−22.83
JD	B K Prasad	1,037	1.84	−3.20
Independent	Shyam Sunder	651	1.16	
BSP	Om Prakash Mehra	623	1.11	−0.83
SS	Arun Kumar	542	0.96	
SP	Mani Ram Yadav	81	0.14	
Independent	Rajpal	47	0.08	
JP	K Ravindran	43	0.08	
Independent	Kailash Chand	31	0.06	
Independent	Sudama Singh	25	0.04	
Independent	Anil Kumar Diwan	22	0.04	
Majority		1,383	2.46	−0.77
Turnout		56,208	44.99	−20.07
BJP hold		Swing	-10.12	

=== 1993 ===
Delhi Assembly elections, 1993: Rajinder Nagar
Party	Candidate	Votes	%	±%
BJP	Puran Chand Yogi	23,847	47.75	
INC	Brahm Yadav	22,234	44.52	
JD	Ram Ashish	2,519	5.04	
BSP	Vijay Kumar	971	1.94	
LKD	Surinder Singh	101	0.20	
Independent	Puran Chand	79	0.16	
Independent	Rajesh	79	0.16	
Independent	Narinder Singh	45	0.09	
Independent	Ramesh	37	0.07	
Independent	Bhagwan Dass	31	0.06	
Majority		1,613	3.23	
Turnout		49,943	65.06	
BJP hold		Swing		
