= Durgesh Pathak =

Indian politician

Member of the Delhi Legislative Assembly
- In office 26 June 2022 – 8 February 2025
- Preceded by: Raghav Chadha
- Succeeded by: Umang Bajaj
- Constituency: Rajinder Nagar

Personal details
- Born: Uttar Pradesh, India
- Party: Aam Aadmi Party
- Education: Master's in English
- Alma mater: Allahabad University

Durgesh Pathak is an Indian politician and was Member of Legislative Assembly in Delhi. He is a senior member of the Aam Aadmi Party and Political Affairs Committee (the highest decision-making body) and National Executive In-charge of the party.

He won the Delhi Assembly by-election, 2022 as the AAP candidate for the seat of MLA from the Rajendra Nagar assembly constituency in Delhi.

He was appointed Chairman of Committee on Government Undertakings of (Delhi) and Committee on Municipal Corporation of (Delhi) post MCD Elections 2022.

In 2025 Delhi Assembly Elections he lost to BJP candidate in Rajinder Nagar constituency.

== Early life and career ==
He completed Master's in English from Allahabad University and moved to Delhi in 2010.

== Politics ==
In 2013, he managed the election campaign for AAP national convenor Arvind Kejriwal and helped defeat Sheila Dixit the incumbent Delhi Chief Minister.

He is a member of Political Affairs Committee (the highest decision-making body) and National Executive In-charge of the party. He is in-charge of Municipal Corporation of Delhi election for AAP. In June 2022, he contested from Rajendra Nagar in Delhi Assembly by-election, 2022 against BJP's candidate Rajesh Bhatia and won by 11,000 lead. He lost his seat in the 2025 polls to BJP candidate Umang Bajaj by a margin of over 1,200 votes.

On 14 May 2026, the Delhi High Court Judge Swarana Kanta Sharma initiated criminal contempt proceedings against 06 AAP leaders, Arvind Kejriwal, Manish Sisodia, Sanjay Singh, Vinay Mishra, Durgesh Pathak and Saurabh Bharadwaj. She said that they had posted defamatory, contemptuous and vilifying things against her, calling it contemptuous of Court. On 19 May, the Delhi High Court issued notice to these leaders in the given criminal contempt proceedings.

== Electoral performance ==
=== 2025 ===
Delhi Assembly, 2025: Rajinder Nagar
Party	Candidate	Votes	%	±%
BJP	Umang Bajaj	46,671	48.01	
AAP	Durgesh Pathak	45,440	46.74	
INC	Vineet Yadav	4,015	4.13	
NOTA	None of the Above	571	0.59	
Majority		1,231	1.27	
Turnout		97,211		
BJP gain from AAP		Swing		

Delhi Assembly by-election, 2022: Rajinder Nagar
Party	Candidate	Votes	%	±%
AAP	Durgesh Pathak	40,319	55.76	−1.30
BJP	Rajesh Bhatia	28,581	39.92	+2.22
INC	Prem Lata	2,014	2.79	−1.01
NOTA	None of the above	546	0.76	
Majority		11,555	15.84	−3.52
Turnout		71,892	43.75	−14.75
Registered electors		1,77,867		
AAP hold		Swing	-1.30	

Delhi Assembly elections, 2020: Karawal Nagar
Party	Candidate	Votes	%	±%
BJP	Mohan Singh Bisht	96,721	50.59	+16.85
AAP	Durgesh Pathak	88,498	46.29	−13.55
INC	Arbind Singh	2,242	1.17	−1.98
BSP	Nathu Ram	824	0.43	−0.86
CPI(M)	Ranjit Tiwari	414	0.22	−0.19
NOTA	None of the above	373	0.20	−0.32
Majority		8,223	4.30	−21.80
Turnout		1,91,291	67.55	−2.28
BJP gain from AAP		Swing	+16.85	

State Legislative Assembly
Preceded by Raghav Chadha (AAP)	Member of the Delhi Legislative Assembly from Rajinder Nagar Assembly constituency 2022 - 2025	Succeeded by Umang Bajaj (BJP)
Aam Aadmi Party political offices
Preceded by Office established	Co in-charge Aam Aadmi Party, Punjab – March, 2017	Incumbent
Preceded by -	Member of Political Affairs Committee; Aam Aadmi Party – present	Incumbent
Preceded by -	National Executive In-charge; Aam Aadmi Party – present	Incumbent
Preceded by -	Incharge of MCD election for Aam Aadmi Party; 2022 – present	Incumbent
