= Umang Bajaj =

Indian politician

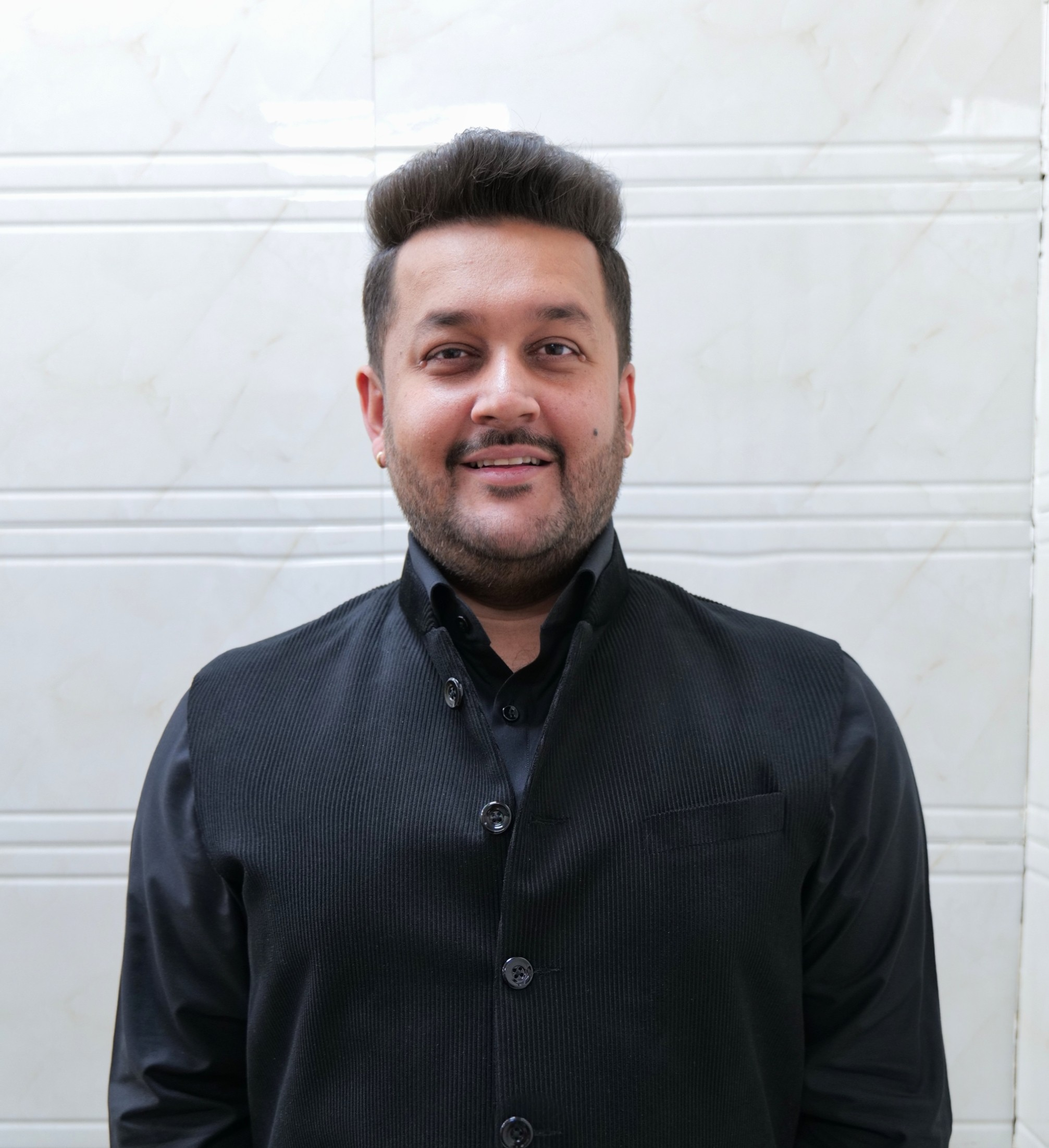

Member of Delhi Legislative Assembly
- Incumbent
- Assumed office 8 February 2025
- Preceded by: Durgesh Pathak
- Constituency: Rajinder Nagar

Personal details
- Party: Bharatiya Janata Party

Umang Bajaj (born 1994) is an Indian politician from Delhi. He is a member of the Delhi Legislative Assembly from Rajinder Nagar Assembly constituency in New Delhi district. He won the 2025 Delhi Legislative Assembly election representing the Bharatiya Janata Party.

== Early life and education ==
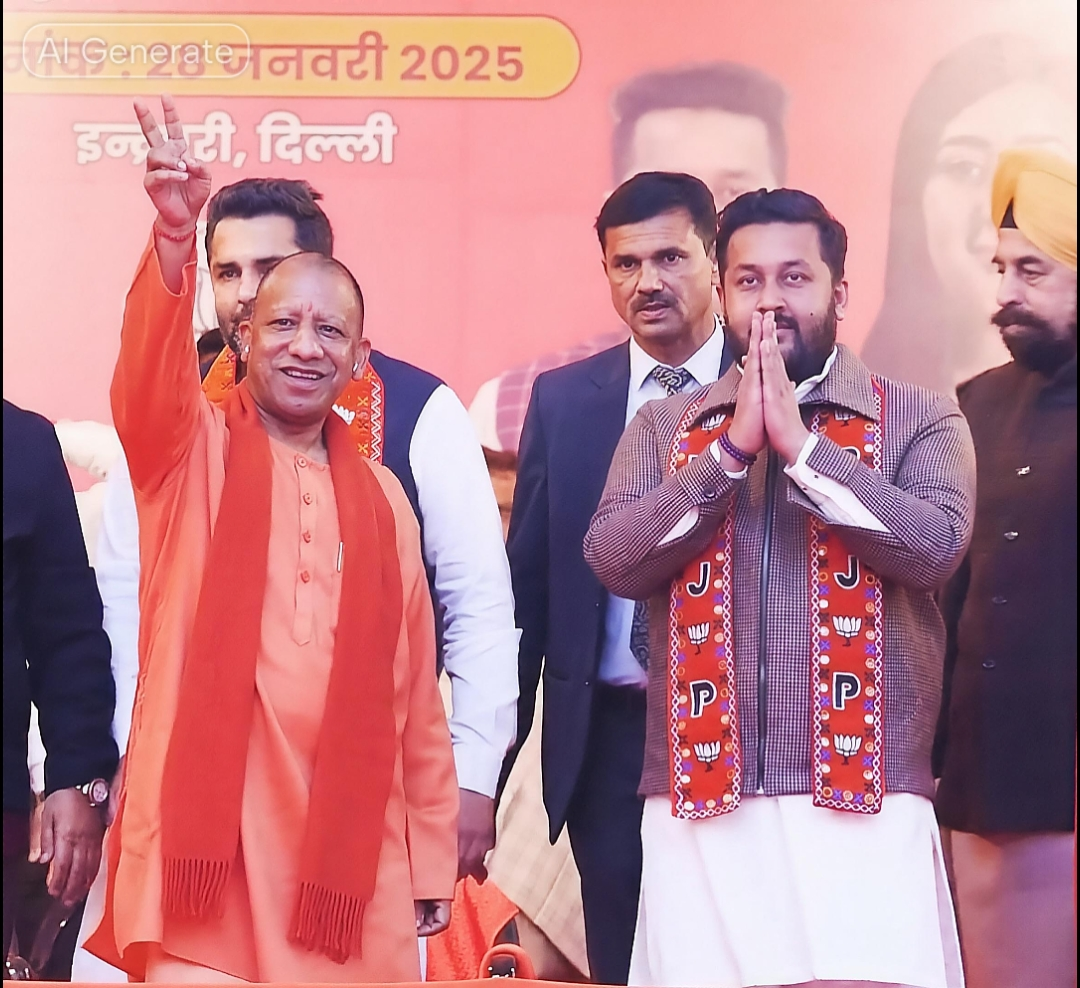
Umang bajaj with Yogi Adityanath

Bajaj is from Rajinder Nagar, New Delhi. He is the son of Umesh Bajaj. He completed his masters in mechanical engineering at the University of Lancaster, United Kingdom in July 2016 and later did his international management degree in 2018 at University of Southampton, also in UK. He works as a part time consultant.

== Career ==
Bajaj began his electoral career winning the Municipal Corporation of Delhi elections and became a Councillor. He won the Rajinder Nagar Assembly constituency representing the Bharatiya Janata Party in the 2025 Delhi Legislative Assembly election. He polled 46,671 votes and defeated his nearest rival, Durgesh Pathak of the Aam Aadmi Party, by a margin of 1,231 votes.
