= Gurcharan Kaur =

Indian politician

Member of Parliament, Rajya Sabha
- In office 2002–2004
- Preceded by: Raj Mohinder Singh Majitha
- Succeeded by: Raj Mohinder Singh Majitha
- Constituency: Punjab

Personal details
- Born: Bibi Gurcharan Kaur Panjgarain; 4 February 1936
- Died: 4 July 2024 (aged 88) Panjgarain Kalan
- Party: Bharatiya Janata Party
- Spouse: Balwant Singh

Bibi Gurcharan Kaur Panjgarain (4 February 1936 – 4 July 2024) was an Indian politician. She was a Member of Parliament, representing Punjab in the Rajya Sabha the upper house of India's Parliament as a member of the Bharatiya Janata Party. Following a prolonged illness, she died on 4 July 2024, at the age of 88 in her native village of Panjgarain Kalan in the Faridkot district of Punjab.
