= Gurpreet Gogi =

Indian politician (1967–2025)

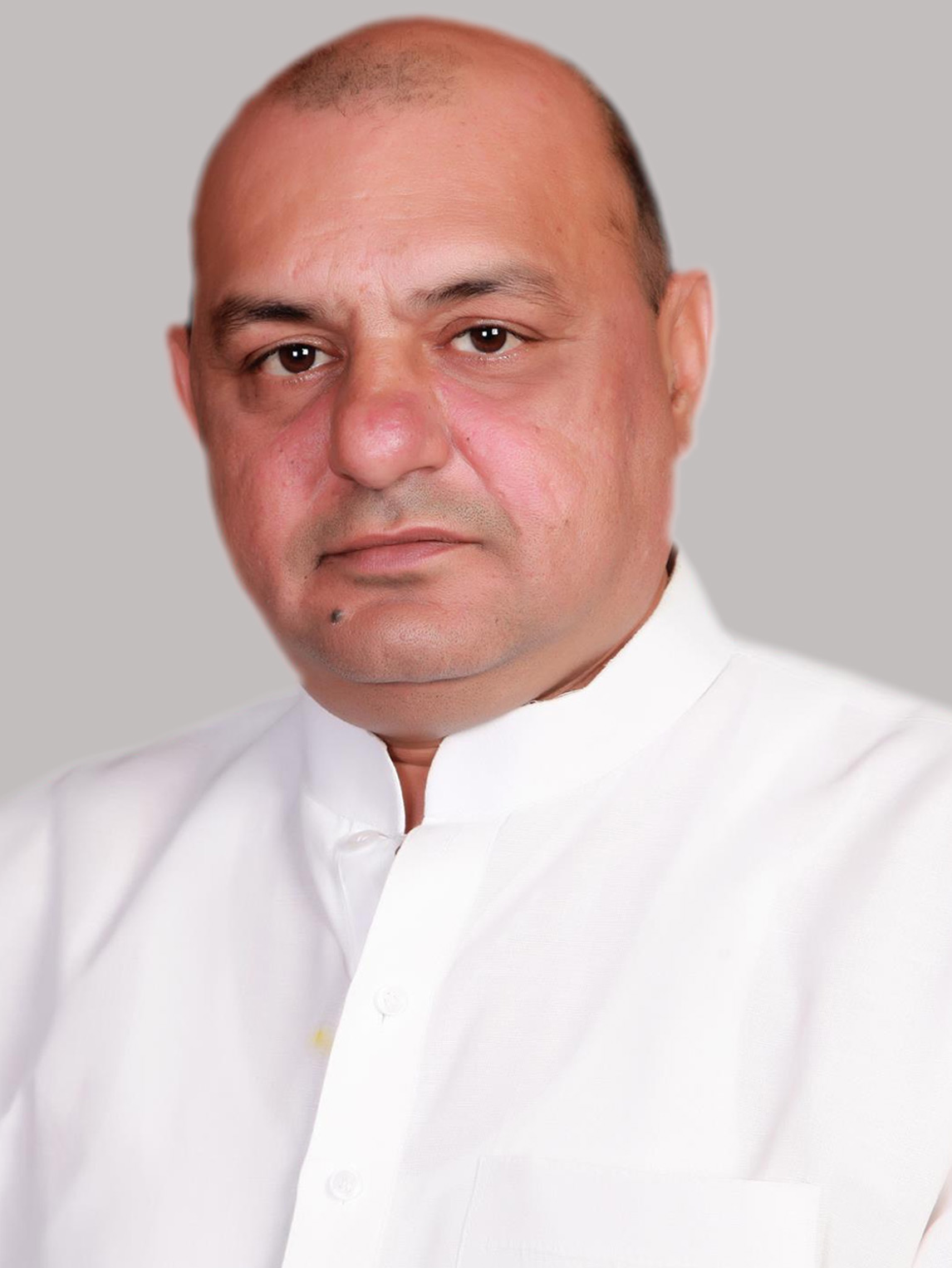

Member of Punjab Legislative Assembly
- In office 2022 – January 11, 2025
- Preceded by: Bharat Bhushan Ashu
- Succeeded by: Sanjeev Arora
- Constituency: Ludhiana West
- Majority: Aam Aadmi Party

Personal details
- Born: 26 September 1967
- Died: 11 January 2025 (aged 57) Ludhiana, Punjab, India
- Party: Aam Aadmi Party

Gurpreet Bassi Gogi (26 September 1967 – 11 January 2025) was an Indian politician and the MLA representing the Ludhiana West Assembly constituency in the Punjab Legislative Assembly. He was a member of the Aam Aadmi Party. He was elected as the MLA in the 2022 Punjab Legislative Assembly election.

== Member of Legislative Assembly ==
Gogi represented the Ludhiana West Assembly constituency as MLA in Punjab Assembly. The Aam Aadmi Party gained a strong 79% majority in the sixteenth Punjab Legislative Assembly by winning 92 out of 117 seats in the 2022 Punjab Legislative Assembly election. MP Bhagwant Mann was sworn in as Chief Minister on 16 March 2022.

Committee assignments of Punjab Legislative Assembly

- Member (2022–23) Committee on Estimates
- Member (2022–23) Committee on Local Bodies

== Death ==
On January 11, 2025, Gurpreet Bassi Gogi died from a gunshot wound at his residence in Ludhiana, Punjab. His family members and Aam Aadmi Party's Punjab unit chief confirmed the accidental nature of the gunfire.

== Electoral performance ==
Punjab Assembly election, 2022: Ludhiana West
Party	Candidate	Votes	%	±%
AAP	Gurpreet Singh Gogi	40,443	34.80	▲10.01
INC	Bharat Bhushan Ashu	32,931	28.30	▼26.56
BJP	Bikram Singh Sidhu	28,107	24.20	▲5.57
SAD	Maheshindar Singh Grewal	10,072	8.70	New
NOTA	None of the above	1,173	0.60	▼0.28
Majority		7,512	6.40	▼23.4
Turnout		1,17,360	64.29	▼5.08
Registered electors		182,545		
AAP gain from INC		Swing		

State Legislative Assembly
Preceded by Bharat Bhushan Ashu	Member of the Punjab Legislative Assembly from Ludhiana West Assembly constituency 2022–2025	Succeeded by Sanjeev Arora (politician)
