= Vijender Garg Vijay =

Indian politician

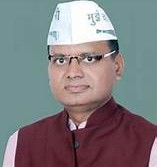
Vijender Garg

Vijender Garg is an Indian politician and was the member of the Sixth Legislative Assembly of Delhi. He is an ex-member of the Aam Aadmi Party and represented Rajinder Nagar (Assembly constituency) of Delhi. He joined Bhartiya Janta Party in 2025. He holds a bachelor's degree in commerce.

== Early life and education ==
Vijender Garg was born in Delhi. He belonged to a middle-class family and being the youngest of all five siblings, he is very close to his parents. His father believed in serving for greater good and actively participated in the wellbeing of people. He was also actively associated with Congress and served the same for 50 years. This as a result encouraged young Vijender Garg to incline towards social service and politics. Vijender Garg as a student, was very sincere and was also involved in co-curricular activities. He was the captain of school and college cricket team and would enjoy most of his free time playing cricket. He got married in 1987 and has three daughters. He considers his wife and his daughters as the strong pillars of his political career, as they stood strong with him during the initial days of election by managing his accounts, planning out the daily schedule, coordinating the programs. Vijender Garg went on to study in Delhi University and graduated.

== Political career ==
Vijender Garg was the General Secretary of Youth Congress and President of Block Commission Committee in Delhi. But with time when Congress started to divert from its principles, he was disappointed. With the formation of AAP, there seemed a hope to fight corruption in India and thus he joined AAP. Even before entering politics during his college days, Vijender Garg won in union elections. After joining AAP, Vijender Garg campaigned for the party nominee in 2013 Delhi Assembly election. In early 2015 when fresh elections were announced AAP fielded Vijender Garg who has been an AAP volunteer in Rajinder Nagar. Vijender Garg won over his predecessor by a margin of 20050 votes. Ever since then he has been representing Rajinder Nagar Constituency and carrying out various development activities in this constituency. Post becoming MLA Vijender Garg has also held important positions in various committees of Delhi government, Delhi Legislative Assembly. Vijender Garg continues to be in news in developments that took place in 5-year term of the government.

== Posts held ==
#	From	To	Position	Notes
01	2015	2020	Member, Sixth Legislative Assembly of Delhi	
02		–	Chairman of NC Joshi Hospital Karol Bagh New Delhi	Presently
03			Chairman of department related Standing Committee on health, Delhi Vidhan Sabha	Presently
04		_	Member of South Delhi Municipal Corporation	Presently

== See also ==
- Sixth Legislative Assembly of Delhi
- 2015 Delhi Legislative Assembly election
- Delhi Legislative Assembly
- Government of India
- Politics of India
- Aam Aadmi Party

State Legislative Assembly
Preceded by R. P. Singh (BJP)	Member of the Delhi Legislative Assembly from Rajinder Nagar Assembly constituency 2015–2020	Succeeded by Raghav Chadha (AAP)
