= Vikramjit Singh Sahney =

Indian entrepreneur and educationist (born 1962)

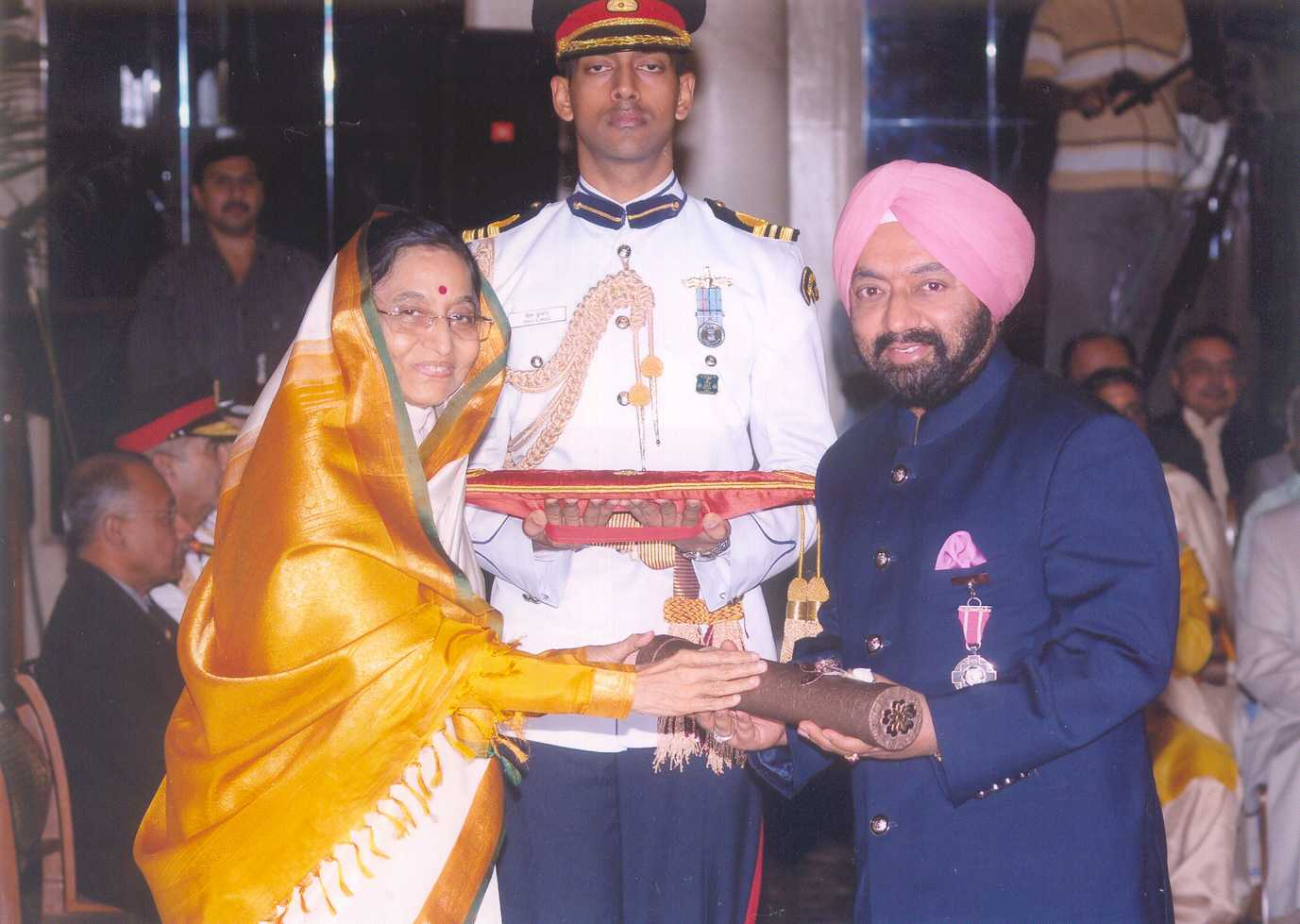
- Sahney receiving the Padma Shri from President Pratibha Patil in 2008
- Born: 20 February 1962 (age 64); Kotkapura, Punjab, India
- Education: Panjab University
- Occupations: Businessperson; politician
- Organisations: World Punjabi Organisation; Chairman Sun Foundation
- Known for: Social reform; Entrepreneurship; Education; Philanthropy
- Spouse: Daisy Paramjit Kaur (m. 1987)
- Children: 2
- Awards: Padma Shri (2008)

Member of Parliament, Rajya Sabha
- Incumbent
- Assumed office 5 July 2022
- Constituency: Punjab

Personal details
- Party: Bharatiya Janata Party
- Other political affiliations: Aam Aadmi Party (until 2026)
- Website: vikramsahney.com

Vikramjit Singh Sahney (born 20 February 1962) is an Indian entrepreneur, educationist and social worker. Sahney received the Padma Shri from the President of India Pratibha Patil and the International Peace Award from the President of Mauritius Anerood Jugnauth at New Delhi. He is a Rajya Sabha member from Punjab. He has been selected for his contributions in social works.

He is the international president of the World Punjabi Organisation, a body operating across 22 countries which promotes Punjabi culture. Sahney is also an entrepreneur and philanthropist. He has also released multiple albums and performs Sufi music.

He holds master's degrees in economics and in business administration.

As international president of the World Punjabi Organisation (WPO), a non-political international body with former Prime Minister of India I. K. Gujral as its chief patron, Sahney has overseen its expansion to over 22 countries, including the UK, the US, Canada, the Middle East, South Africa, Thailand, Singapore and the SAARC nations. He formed the World Punjabi Parliamentarian Forum, led friendship delegations, organized annual Punjabi conferences, and produced light and sound shows such as 'Bole So Nihal', 'Guru Manyo Granth' and 'Sarbansdani'. He has also given scholarships to students, organized celebrations of Guru Nanak's birthday at the residences of the President and the Prime Minister, and was involved in installing an equestrian statue of Maharaja Ranjit Singh in the Parliament House of India.

Sahney's NGO, the Sun Foundation, has set up a World Class Skill Centre in New Delhi and Amritsar. The centres offer skill courses supported by industry. The Centre has the capacity to train approximately 2000 students per year.

During the COVID-19 pandemic, Sahney donated an artificial intelligence-enabled mobile testing clinic and an ambulance in Delhi-NCR and the state of Punjab. He donated a PSA Oxygen plant to GMERS Hospital, Gandhinagar and an ECMO machine to Bala Sahib Hospital, and organized langar for one lakh people every day. He also donated 2000 oxygen cylinders for rural areas of Punjab and 1000 oxygen concentrators in Delhi and Punjab, including to gurdwaras, the Golden Temple in Amritsar and Red Cross societies.

Sahney arranged three chartered flights to evacuate over 500 Afghan Hindus and Sikhs and supported their rehabilitation under the programme “My Family, My Responsibility”, which covered monthly household expenses, medical and health insurance, and the education and training of their children.

Sun Foundation projects recognized by the NSDC include Surya Kiran, which provides free vocational and skill development training to underprivileged women and girls, awareness campaigns against sex discrimination and female feticide under the Beti Bachao Beti Padhao campaign, government drug rehabilitation centres in Amritsar, Taran Taran and Jalandhar, Taare Zameen Par, which runs free skill development centres for disabled youth, and Angels of Sun, a scholarship scheme for underprivileged children. The foundation adopted Shivkarwadi and SuvidhaChawl in Mumbai under Swachh Bharat Abhiyan and has given aid to children of widows, war victims, families of farmers who committed suicide in Vidharbha and victims of disasters such as the tsunami. It also set up the Sikh Heritage Multimedia Museum at Gurdwara Bangla Sahib, which presents the lives of the Sikh Gurus and the tenets of Sikhism.

Sahney is a former president of the India chapter of the International Chamber of Commerce (ICC) in Paris and a former Honorary Consul General of South Africa.

As chair of the BRICS Agri Business Forum, Sahney gave a presentation to the heads of state of the BRICS nations on the global food crisis, global economic recovery and food security.

Sahney has been in Board of National Skill Development Corporation (NSDC); a former Trustee India Brand Equity Foundation, Ministry of Commerce, Govt. of India, Member Board of Trade, Govt. of India, Member India-UAE Joint Task Force, Board Member – Muntajat (Govt. of Qatar) India, Board member – FICCI & ASSOCHEM, Chair - India Africa Business Forum, Chair – India-Arab Council, Secretary General – Maharaja Ranjit Singh Trust.

On 24 April 2026, Singh defected to the Bharatiya Janata Party after quitting the Aam Aadmi Party along with a group of 6 fellow MPs led by Raghav Chadha.

Rajya Sabha
Preceded by List	Member of Parliament in Rajya Sabha for Punjab; 2022 –	Incumbent
