= Rajinder Gupta =

Indian politician and industrialist (born 1959)

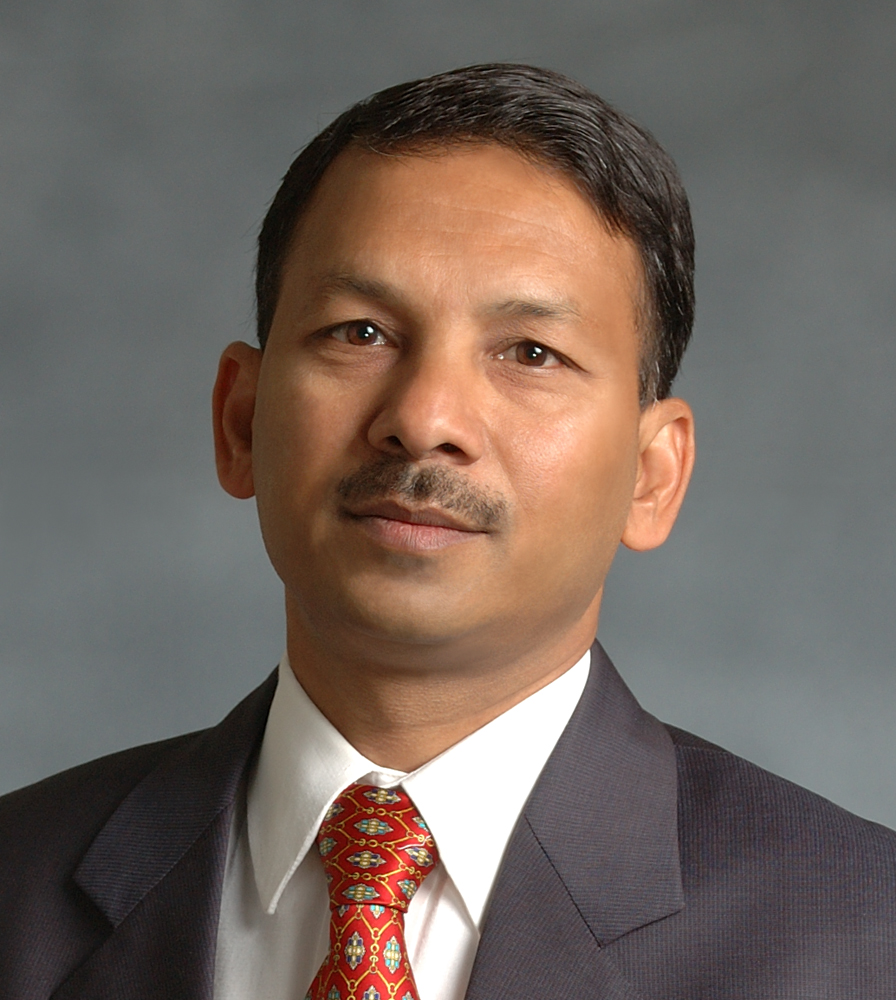
- Gupta in 2006

Member of Parliament, Rajya Sabha
- Incumbent
- Assumed office 24 October 2025
- Preceded by: Sanjeev Arora
- Constituency: Punjab

Personal details
- Born: 2 January 1959 (age 67) Bathinda, Punjab, India
- Party: Bharatiya Janata Party (2026 - Present)
- Other political affiliations: Aam Aadmi Party (2025 - 2026)
- Spouse: Madhu Gupta
- Children: Abhishek Gupta; Neha Gupta
- Occupation: Politician; industrialist
- Awards: Padma Shri (2007)

Rajinder Gupta (born 2 January 1959) is an Indian politician and industrialist who has been serving as a Member of Parliament in the Rajya Sabha from Punjab since October 2025. He is the founder and Chairman Emeritus of the Trident Group, an Indian conglomerate engaged in textiles, paper and chemicals.

Gupta was awarded the Padma Shri in 2007 for his contributions to trade and industry. In 2025, he was elected unopposed to the Rajya Sabha, the Upper House of India's Parliament, representing the state of Punjab.

== Early life and business career ==
Gupta was born on 2 January 1959 in Bathinda, Punjab. He began his entrepreneurial career in the 1980s with the establishment of Abhishek Industries, a fertiliser manufacturing venture founded in 1985. He later entered the textile sector in 1991 with the establishment of a yarn manufacturing unit in Barnala, Punjab.

The business was rebranded as the Trident Group in 2011 and expanded into home textiles, paper, chemicals and power generation. The group operates manufacturing facilities in Punjab and Madhya Pradesh and exports its products internationally.

In 2022, Gupta stepped down from executive responsibilities and assumed the role of Chairman Emeritus, citing health and family reasons.

== Political career ==
In 2025, he was fielded by the Aam Aadmi Party as a candidate for the Rajya Sabha by-election from Punjab. He was elected unopposed following the resignation of Sanjeev Arora in October 2025 and was sworn in as a Member of Parliament on 6 November.

Prior to his election, Gupta resigned from public positions, including his role as Vice-Chairman of the Punjab State Economic Policy and Planning Board.

According to declarations reported by The Times of India, Gupta disclosed assets worth over ₹5,000 crore in his election affidavit.

On 24 April 2026, he defected to the Bharatiya Janata Party along with 6 other Rajya Sabha MPs including Raghav Chadha and Swati Maliwal.

== Public and institutional roles ==
Gupta has held several public and institutional roles, including:

- Vice-Chairman, Punjab State Economic Policy and Planning Board
- Chairman, Board of Governors, Punjab Engineering College (Deemed University), Chandigarh
- Chairman, Advisory Council for Punjab, Haryana, Chandigarh and Himachal Pradesh, Federation of Indian Chambers of Commerce and Industry (FICCI)
- Member, Governing Council - Chandigarh Citizens Foundation

He has also been involved in sports administration and served as president of the Punjab Cricket Association.

== Awards and recognition ==
- Padma Shri (2007) – Awarded by the Government of India for contributions to trade and industry.
- Vastra Ratna (Special Achiever) Award – Conferred by the Textile Export Promotion Council (TEXPROCIL).

Rajya Sabha
Preceded by Sanjeev Arora	Member of Parliament in Rajya Sabha for Punjab; 2025–present	Succeeded by Incumbent
