= Bharat Bhushan Ashu =

Indian politician from Punjab

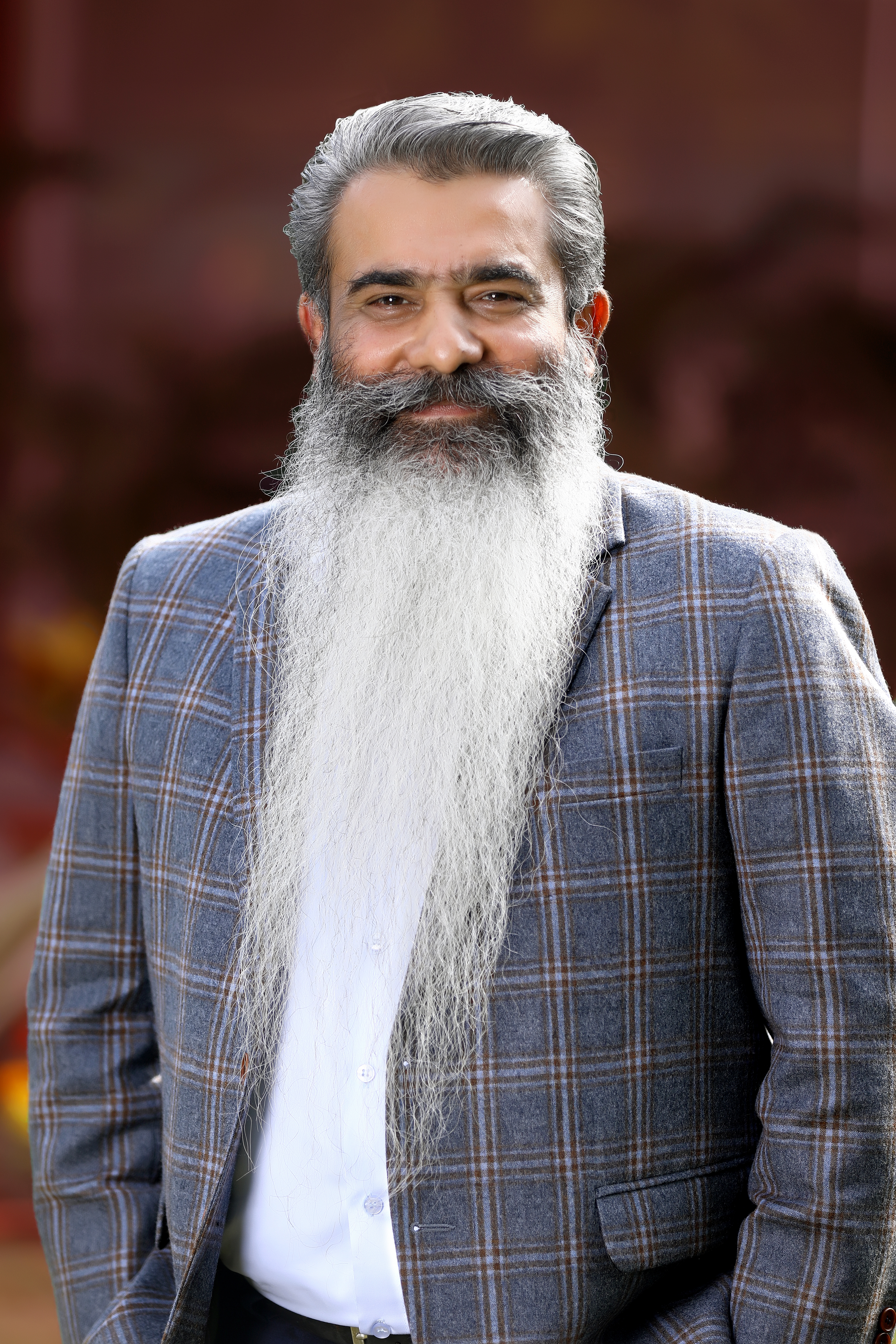

Cabinet Minister of Food & Civil Supplies and Consumer Affairs Government of Punjab
- In office 2021–2022

Member of Punjab Legislative Assembly
- In office 2012–2022
- Preceded by: Harish Rai Dhanda
- Succeeded by: Gurpreet Gogi
- Constituency: Ludhiana West

Municipal Sub Councillor
- Incumbent
- Assumed office 1997 – 2002; 2002–2007; 2007–2012

Personal details
- Born: 20 March 1971 (age 55) Ludhiana, Punjab, India
- Party: Indian National Congress

Bharat Bhushan Ashu (born 20 March 1971) is an Indian National Congress politician from Punjab. He was two-time MLA representing the Ludhiana West Assembly constituency and he was Cabinet Minister of Food, Civil Supplies & Consumer Affairs, Government of Punjab.

== Political career ==
Ashu started his political career when he was elected as a Municipal Councillor in the year 1997 from ward number 48 of Ludhiana.

In the year 2012, he was allotted a ticket of the Indian National Congress to contest from Ludhiana West Vidhan Sabha constituency and he becomes the Deputy CLP leader in the Punjab Vidhan Sabha.

Again in the year 2017, he defeated Ahbaab Grewal of Aam Aadmi Party with a margin of 36,521 votes. He was the Cabinet Minister of Food & Civil Supplies and Consumer Affairs, Government of Punjab.

In 2022, he lost the election from Ludhiana West to AAP Candidate Gurpreet Bassi Gogi by more than 7500 votes.

In 2025 bypoll, he lost the election from Ludhiana West to AAP Candidate Sanjeev Arora by 10,637 votes.

== Other activities ==
In January 2019, Ashu was publicly seen and captured by media while misbehaving with female officer in a public function.

In February 2019, Audio recordings of Ashu threatening and blackmailing the then DSP & Superintending engineer of Improvement trust went viral.

In October 2019, Ashu was blamed for thrashing his own party's volunteer during by-election preparations.

In 2025, he accused AAP of creating governance crisis in Punjab.
