= Ministry of Law and Justice (India) =

Government ministry of India

Ministry of Law & Justice
- Vidhi aura Nyāya Maṁtrālaya
- Branch of Government of India

- Ministry of Law & Justice

Agency overview
- Formed: 1833; 193 years ago
- Jurisdiction: Government of India
- Headquarters: Shastri Bhawan, New Delhi; 28°36′58.97″N 77°12′55.76″E
- Minister responsible: Arjun Ram Meghwal, Minister of Law and Justice (Independent Charge)
- Agency executives: Anju Rathi Rana, Secretary (Legal Affairs); Dr. Rajiv Mani, Secretary (Legislative Department); Niraj Verma, IAS, Secretary (Justice)
- Child agencies: Department of Legal Affairs; Legislative Department; Department of Justice
- Website: lawmin.gov.in

The Ministry of Law and Justice (ISO: Vidhi aura Nyāya Maṁtrālaya) in the Government of India is a cabinet ministry which deals with the management of the legal affairs, legislative activities and administration of justice in India through its three departments namely the Legislative Department and the Department of Legal Affairs and the Department of Justice respectively. The Department of Legal Affairs is concerned with advising the various Ministries of the Central Government while the Legislative Department is concerned with drafting of principal legislation for the Central Government. The ministry is headed by Cabinet Minister of Law and Justice Arjun Ram Meghwal appointed by the President of India on the recommendation of the Prime Minister of India. The first Law and Justice minister of independent India was Dr. B. R. Ambedkar, who served in the Prime Minister Jawaharlal Nehru's cabinet during 1947–51.

== History ==
Ministry of law and justice is the oldest limb of the government of India dating back to 1833 when the Charter Act 1833 was enacted by the British Parliament when India was under British control. The said Act vested for the first time legislative power in a single authority, namely the Governor General in Council. By virtue of this authority and the authority vested under him under section 22 of the Indian Councils Act 1861 the Governor General in Council enacted laws for the country from 1834 to 1920. After the commencement of the Government of India Act 1919 the legislative power was exercised by the Indian Legislature constituted thereunder. The Government of India Act 1919 was followed by the Government of India Act 1935. With the passing of the Indian Independence Act 1947 India became a 'dominion' and the 'dominion legislature' made laws from 1947 to 1949 under the provisions of section 100 of the Government of India Act 1935 as adapted by the India (Provisional Constitution) Order 1947. When the Constitution of India came into force on 26 January 1950, the legislative power thereafter got vested in the Parliament of India.

== Organisation ==
The Government of India (Allocation of Business) Rules of 1961 entail the various departments working under the Ministry of Law and Justice of Government of India. In terms of these Rules, the Ministry comprises the following departments:

- Department of Legal Affairs
- Legislative Department
- Department of Justice.

=== Department of Legal Affairs ===
The Department of Legal Affairs has two main duties: advice and litigation. Specifically, the following functions are allocated to the Department:

1. Advice to Ministries on legal matters including interpretation of the Constitution and the laws, conveyancing and engagement of counsel to appear on behalf of the Union of India in the High Courts and subordinate courts where the Union of India is a party.
2. Attorney General of India, Solicitor General of India, and other Central Government law officers of the States whose services are shared by the Ministries of the Government of India.
3. Conduct of cases in the Supreme Court and the High Courts on behalf of the Central Government and on behalf of the Governments of States participating in the Central Agency Scheme.
4. Reciprocal arrangements with foreign countries for the service of summons in civil suits, for the execution of decrees of Civil Courts, for the enforcement of maintenance orders, and for the administration of the estates of foreigners dying in India intestate.
5. Authorization of officers to execute contracts and assurances and of property on behalf of the President under Article 299(1) of the Constitution, and authorization of officers to sign and verify plaints or written statements in suits by or against the Central Government.
6. Indian Legal Service.
7. Treaties and agreements with foreign countries in matters of civil law.
8. Law Commission.
9. Legal Profession including the Advocates Act, 1961 (25 of 1961) and persons entitled to practice before High Courts.
10. Enlargement of the jurisdiction of Supreme Court and the conferring thereon of further powers; persons entitled to practice before the Supreme Court; references to the Supreme Court under Article 143 of the Constitution of India.
11. Administration of the Notaries Act, 1952 (53 of 1952).
12. Income-tax Appellate Tribunal.
13. Appellate Tribunal for Foreign Exchange.
14. Legal aid to the poor.

The Department's Main Secretariat is in New Delhi. It also maintains Branch Secretariats in the cities of Mumbai, Kolkata, Chennai and Bengaluru.

=== Legislative Department ===
The Legislative Department is mainly concerned with drafting of all principal legislation for the Central Government i.e. Bills to be introduced in Parliament, Ordinances to be promulgated by the President, measures to be enacted as President's Acts for States under the President's rule and Regulations to be made by the President for Union territories. It is also concerned with election Laws namely the Representation of the People Act 1950 and the Representation of the People Act 1951. In addition, it is also entrusted with the task of dealing with certain matters relating to List III of the Seventh Schedule to the Constitution like personal law, contracts evidence, etc. The responsibility of maintaining up to date the statutes enacted by Parliament is also with this Department. The Allocation of Business Rules identify the following functions to be carried out by this Department:

1. The drafting of Bills, including the business of the Draftsmen in Select Committees, drafting and promulgation of Ordinances and Regulations; enactment of State Acts as President's Acts whenever required; scrutiny of Statutory Rules and Orders (except notifications under clause (a) of section 3, section 3A and section 3D, of the National Highways Act, 1956 (48 of 1956)).
2. Constitution Orders; notifications for bringing into force Constitution (Amendment) Acts.
3. (a) Publication of Central Acts, Ordinance and Regulations; (b) Publication of authorised translations in Hindi of Central Acts, Ordinances, Orders, Rules, Regulations and bye-laws referred to in section 5(1) of the Official Languages Act, 1963 (19 of 1963).
4. Compilation and publication of unrepealed Central Acts, Ordinances and Regulations of general statutory Rules and Orders, and other similar publications.
5. Elections to Parliament, to the Legislatures of States, to the Offices of the President and Vice-President; and the Election Commission.
6. Preparation and publication of standard legal terminology for use, as far as possible, in all official languages.
7. Preparation of authoritative texts in Hindi of all Central Acts and of Ordinances promulgated and Regulations made by the President and of all rules, regulations and orders made by the Central Government under such Acts, Ordinances and Regulations.
8. Making arrangements for the translation into official languages of the States of Central Acts and of Ordinances promulgated and Regulations made by the President and for the translation of all State Acts and Ordinances into Hindi if the texts of such Acts or Ordinance are in a language other than Hindi.
9. Publication of law books and law journals in Hindi.
10. Marriage and divorce; infants and minors; adoption, wills; intestate and succession; joint family and partition.
11. Transfer of property other than agricultural land (excluding benami transactions registration of deeds and documents).
12. Contracts, but not including those relating to agricultural land.
13. Actionable wrongs.
14. Bankruptcy and insolvency.
15. Trusts and trustees, Administrators, General and Official Trustees.
16. Evidence and oaths.
17. Civil Procedure including Limitation and Arbitration.
18. Charitable and religious endowments and religious institutions.

=== Department of Justice ===
The Department of Justice performs the administrative functions in relation to the appointment of various judges at various courts in India, maintenance and revision of the conditions and rules of service of the judges and other related areas. The Department is housed in Jaisalmer House. The Allocation of Business Rules identify the following functions to be carried out by this Department:

1. Appointment, resignation and removal of the Chief Justice of India and Judges of the Supreme Court of India; their salaries, rights in respect of leave of absence (including leave allowances), pensions and travelling allowances.
2. Appointment, resignation and removal, etc., of Chief Justice and Judges of High Courts in States; their salaries, rights in respect of leave of absence (including leave allowances), pensions and travelling allowances.
3. Appointment of Judicial Commissioners and Judicial officers in Union Territories.
4. Constitution and organisation (excluding jurisdiction and powers) of the Supreme Court (but including contempt of such Court) and the fees taken therein.
5. Constitution and organisation of the High Courts and the Courts of Judicial Commissioners except provisions as to officers and servants of these courts.
6. Administration of justice.
7. Creation of all India Judicial Service.
8. Conditions of service of District Judges and other Members of Higher Judicial Service of Union Territories.
9. Extension of the Jurisdiction of a High Court to a Union Territory or exclusion of a Union Territory from the Jurisdiction of a High Court.
10. Extension of the Jurisdiction of a High Court to a Union Territory or exclusion of a Union Territory from the Jurisdiction of a High Court.
11. Appointment, resignation and removal of the Chief Justice of India and Judges of the Supreme Court of India; their salaries, rights in respect of leave of absence (including rules of service of the judges and other related areas the allocation of business rules identify the following functions to be carried out by this department leave of creation of all India Judicial Service).

=== Other Judicial Bodies in India ===
- National Green Tribunal

== See also ==
- Minister of Law and Justice
- Cabinet of India
- Government of India
- Law Commission of India
- Constitution of India
- Pendency of court cases in India
