= R. P. Singh (politician) =

Indian politician

Member of the Delhi Legislative Assembly
- In office 2013–2015
- Preceded by: Ramakant Goswami
- Succeeded by: Vijender Garg Vijay
- Constituency: Rajinder Nagar

Personal details
- Born: R. P. Singh; 21 August 1961 (age 64) Delhi
- Party: Bharatiya Janata Party
- Spouse: Mamta Singh
- Children: One son & One Daughter
- Parent: Sardar Jasbir Singh (father)
- Education: B. Com. 2nd year (Pass)
- Profession: Businessman

Sardar R. P. Singh is an Indian politician and member of the Bharatiya Janata Party. Sardar R. P. Singh was a member of the Delhi Legislative Assembly from the Rajinder Nagar in New Delhi district. He is the National secretary of the Delhi Bharatiya Janata Party and a national spokesperson for the party.
