= Sanjeev Arora (politician) =

Indian businessman and politician

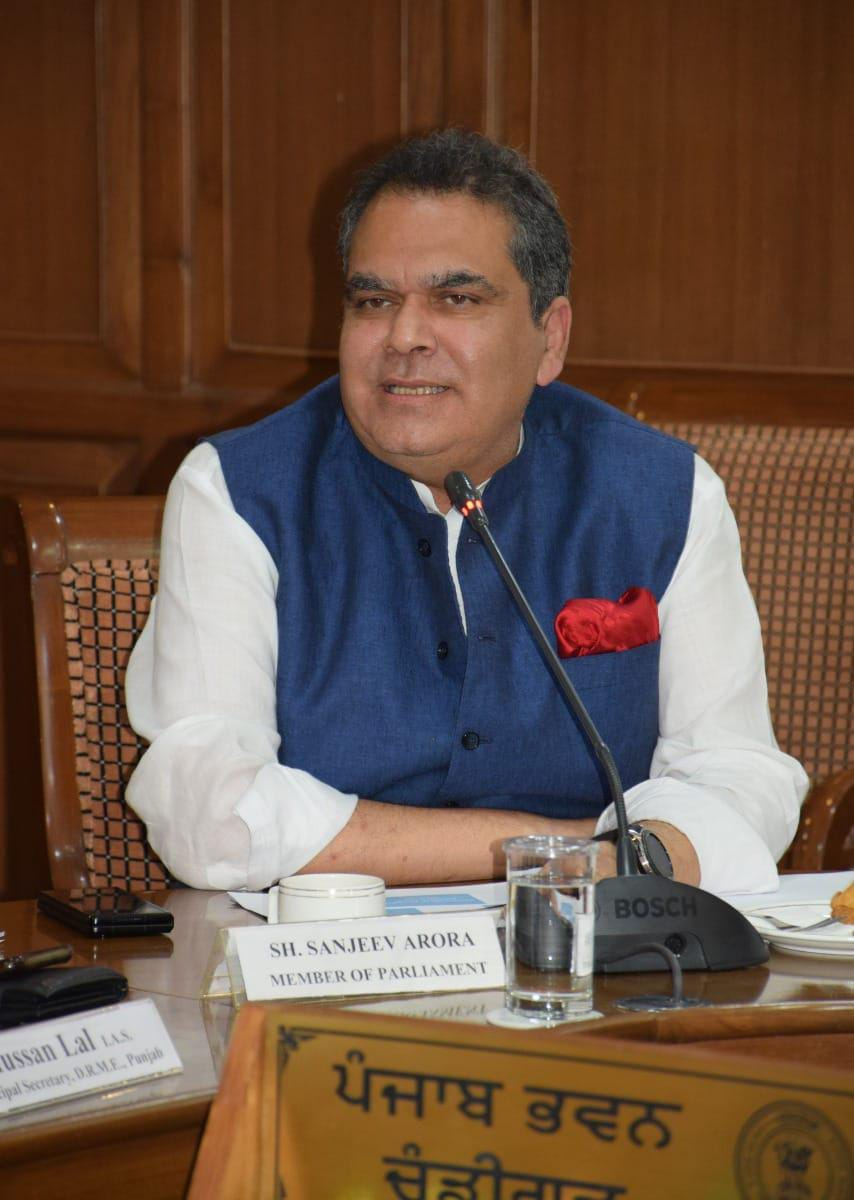

Cabinet Minister, Government of Punjab
- Incumbent
- Assumed office 3 July 2025
- Governor: Gulab Chand Kataria
- Cabinet: Mann ministry
- Chief Minister: Bhagwant Mann
- Ministry and Departments: Industry and Commerce; Investment Promotion; NRI Affairs; Power; Local Government

Member of Legislative Assembly, Punjab
- Incumbent
- Assumed office 23 June 2025
- Preceded by: Gurpreet Gogi
- Constituency: Ludhiana West

Member of Parliament, Rajya Sabha
- In office 10 April 2022 – 1 July 2025
- Preceded by: Shamsher Singh Dullo
- Succeeded by: Rajinder Gupta
- Constituency: Punjab, India

Personal details
- Born: 18 September 1963 (age 63) Ludhiana, Punjab, India
- Party: Aam Aadmi Party

Sanjeev Arora is an Indian businessman and politician from the Aam Aadmi Party (AAP), who is currently serving as a cabinet minister in Government of Punjab. He previously served as a Member of Parliament, Rajya Sabha from 10 April 2022 to 1 July 2025.

== Businesses ==
Arora’s primary business has been in the export industry, operating under Ritesh Industries Ltd for over three decades, with exports primarily to the United States. In 2006, he diversified into real estate and renamed the company to Ritesh Properties and Industries Ltd (RPIL). Under RPIL, he developed the “Hampton Business Park” and “Hampton Homes” on Chandigarh Road, creating a hub for multiple industries.

In 2018, Arora founded Femella Fashions Ltd, launching the “Femella” women’s wear brand, which sells on several online retail portals. In 2019, he ventured into the non-ferrous metal business with Teneron Limited, collaborating with Suzuki Motors under the Make in India initiative.

== Jail ==
In May 2026, the Enforcement Directorate arrested him in a money-laundering case linked to alleged ₹100–102 crore GST fraud and fictitious mobile-phone exports by his company Hampton Sky Realty Ltd. He has remained in judicial custody at Bhondsi Jail, Gurugram, with bail pleas rejected by lower courts and the Punjab & Haryana High Court (as of October 2026).

== Political career ==
=== Rajya Sabha (2022–2025) ===
In March 2022, Arora was elected unopposed to the Rajya Sabha from Punjab as one of five AAP nominees. In 2023, The Indian Express profiled his work in the Rajya Sabha.

He took oath on 10 April 2022. During his tenure, he raised issues pertaining to infrastructure, healthcare, industry, and airport development projects—most notably fast-tracking the Halwara Airport project near Ludhiana, which was inaugurated by Prime Minister Narendra Modi on 1 February 2026. He also focused on upgrading the ESI Hospital in Ludhiana, pushing for improvements to local railway stations, and advocating new roads for industrial focal points.

=== Ludhiana West by-election ===
In February 2025, the Aam Aadmi Party announced Arora as its candidate for the Ludhiana West by-election, necessitated by the death of sitting AAP MLA Gurpreet Gogi. In June 2025, he defeated Congress candidate Bharat Bhushan Ashu by a margin of 10,637 votes.

As the Constitution bars simultaneous membership of Parliament and a state legislature, Arora resigned from the Rajya Sabha on 1 July 2025.

=== Punjab cabinet minister ===
On 3 July 2025, Chief Minister Bhagwant Mann inducted Arora into the state cabinet, replacing Kuldeep Singh Dhaliwal, and allotted him the Industry and Commerce, Investment Promotion and NRI Affairs portfolios. In August 2025, he was also given the Power department, previously held by Harbhajan Singh ETO, and on 8 January 2026 the Local Government department.

== Development work ==
As a Rajya Sabha member, Arora took up a range of infrastructure and development issues concerning Ludhiana and Punjab with Union ministers, particularly after the formation of the new Union government in June 2024.

=== Roads and highways ===
In June 2022, Arora met Union Minister of Road Transport and Highways Nitin Gadkari in New Delhi and sought early completion of ongoing NHAI projects, particularly those passing through Ludhiana, citing daily traffic congestion. He also raised the declaration of more state roads in Punjab as national highways, noting that of 14 state roads (1,043 km) declared in-principle national highways in 2016–17, five (481.69 km) had been notified.

In August 2024, Arora announced that work on four bridges over the Sidhwan Canal in Ludhiana, part of a ₹16 crore (US$1.7 million) NHAI project intended to ease traffic congestion, would resume on 12 October.

In November 2024, Arora again met Gadkari to request a vehicular underpass (VUP) crossing NH-44 near Dhandari Kalan railway station, where heavy goods traffic from the adjoining industrial area caused congestion and accidents. He also sought VUPs/light vehicular underpasses at seven locations in Ludhiana, including the Jalandhar Bypass, Kailash Nagar Chowk and Kakowal Chowk–Shekhewal, to address accident black spots. The ministry directed officials to prepare a feasibility report for the Dhandari VUP.

On 14 May 2025, Arora laid foundation stones for nine road projects worth ₹8.34 crore in Ludhiana to improve urban infrastructure.

=== Railways ===
In June 2024, Arora met Railways Minister Ashwini Vaishnaw and sought a new Shatabdi or Vande Bharat Express service between Delhi and Ludhiana, departing Delhi in the evening and returning the next morning, to serve the city's business community. He also requested a short halt at Sabzi Mandi station in Delhi for the Amritsar Shatabdi Express, citing its proximity to commercial hubs, and sent a similar request to Minister of State for Railways Ravneet Singh Bittu. According to Arora, the minister assured him of additional trains and said the proposed halt would be studied technically.

=== Industry and food processing ===
In June 2024, shortly after the formation of the new Union government, Arora met Union Minister of Food Processing Industries Chirag Paswan in Delhi and raised the implementation of central schemes for food processing in Punjab. He told the minister that of the state's two approved mega food parks, the International Mega Food Park in Fazilka had not taken off and the Sukhjit Mega Food Park in Kapurthala remained under-utilised. Relaying industry suggestions, he said the 50-acre land requirement for mega food parks was impractical in Punjab given high land costs, proposed extending equivalent incentives to single-unit food processing projects, and sought special incentives for exports of processed food from the state. In October 2024, Paswan replied that the Mega Food Park scheme had been discontinued in April 2021, and pointed to assistance available under the Pradhan Mantri Kisan Sampada Yojana, including smaller agro-processing clusters requiring 10 acres of land, as well as the micro food processing formalisation and Production Linked Incentive schemes.

=== Healthcare and sports ===
In December 2023, following a meeting chaired by Chief Minister Bhagwant Mann, Arora took up the renovation and upgrading of three district hospitals in Punjab, at Ludhiana, Hoshiarpur and Sangrur, with the aim of bringing their facilities up to the standard of private hospitals. At the Civil Hospital, Ludhiana, the work was funded through his MPLAD allocation and corporate social responsibility (CSR) contributions. By July 2024, a rodent-control programme had been completed at the hospital's mother and child wing, and work was under way to restore its two lifts, which had been out of service for 12 years, alongside toilet renovation, boundary-wall strengthening and rainwater harvesting. Further work reviewed in November 2024 included new sewer lines, fire-safety measures, roof waterproofing, internal roads and a waiting shed for patients' attendants. In May 2025, an upgraded eight-bed intensive care unit, with four ventilator-supported and four high-dependency beds, was inaugurated at the hospital by state ministers and Arora; Health Minister Balbir Singh credited the hospital's modernisation to MPLAD and CSR funds arranged by Arora.

In August 2024, Arora met Mansukh Mandaviya, Union Minister of Labour and Employment and Youth Affairs and Sports, and sought expansion of the ESIC Hospital in Ludhiana to 500 beds. Noting that a structural audit report was a prerequisite for the expansion and that progress had been slow, he asked the minister to intervene with the ESIC Director General to expedite the project. He also requested central funding for indoor and outdoor stadiums in rural Punjab, specifically for a proposal by the Sri Guru Hargobind Ujagar Hari Trust in Sidhwan Khurd, Ludhiana district, which runs schools and girls' colleges and estimated the indoor stadium at ₹3 crore (US$310,000).

== Philanthropy and family ==
Having lost both parents to cancer, Arora established the “Krishna Pran Breast Cancer Charitable Trust” over 15 years ago to provide free treatment to underprivileged cancer patients. The trust has reportedly helped more than 160 cancer patients by covering their treatment costs, and it continues to fund medication and follow-up care. During the COVID-19 pandemic, it also supplied ambulances, PPE kits, and other resources to local authorities.

The trust organises "Unite for Pinktober", an annual breast cancer awareness event held in Ludhiana during Breast Cancer Awareness Month. The October 2024 edition at Guru Nanak Dev Bhawan featured actress Mahima Chaudhry, a breast cancer survivor, who spoke about her diagnosis and treatment and stressed the importance of early detection. The October 2025 edition featured actress Hina Khan and Seema Bansal, vice-chairperson of the Punjab Development Commission, both breast cancer survivors; Arora, by then a state cabinet minister, emphasised self-examination and early detection in his address.

In September 2023, over 1.5 lakh people in India raised ₹10.5 crore via crowdfunding to fund Zolgensma gene therapy for Kanav Jangra, a child with spinal muscular atrophy, with support from MPs including Arora and Sanjay Singh, who helped ensure the treatment was administered.

Arora is also the Vice President of Dayanand Medical College & Hospital in Ludhiana and was formerly on the Apex Council of the Punjab Cricket Association. He has served two consecutive terms as secretary of the Sutlej Club in Ludhiana and is associated with the Ved Mandir Trust in Daresi.

== Honours and recognition ==
In recognition of his social service, Arora received the “Son of Ludhiana” award in 2022. Additionally, he allocates a portion of his MPLAD funds for upgrading educational institutions and healthcare facilities in Ludhiana.

Rajya Sabha
Preceded by List	Member of Parliament in Rajya Sabha for Punjab; 2022 – 2025	Succeeded by Rajinder Gupta
