= Raghav Chadha =

Indian politician (born 1988)

Member of Parliament, Rajya Sabha
- Incumbent
- Assumed office 10 April 2022
- Preceded by: Naresh Gujral
- Constituency: Punjab

Vice Chairman of the Delhi Jal Board
- In office 2 March 2020 – 22 March 2022
- Preceded by: Dinesh Mohaniya
- Succeeded by: Saurabh Bharadwaj

Member of Delhi Legislative Assembly
- In office 12 February 2020 – 24 March 2022
- Preceded by: Vijender Garg Vijay
- Succeeded by: Durgesh Pathak
- Constituency: Rajinder Nagar

Personal details
- Born: 11 November 1988 (age 37) Central Delhi, Delhi, India
- Party: Bharatiya Janata Party (since 2026)
- Other political affiliations: Aam Aadmi Party (2012–2026)
- Spouse: Parineeti Chopra (m. 2023)
- Children: 1
- Education: University of Delhi; Institute of Chartered Accountants of India; London School of Economics
- Occupation: Politician
- Profession: Chartered accountant

Raghav Chadha (born 11 November 1988) is an Indian politician and chartered accountant who serves as a Member of Parliament in the Rajya Sabha since 2022. He served as a Member of the Legislative Assembly (MLA) from the Rajinder Nagar constituency in Delhi from 2020 to 2022. Formerly an outspoken member of the Aam Aadmi Party from 2012 to 2026, Chadha defected to the Bharatiya Janata Party (BJP) in April 2026.

== Early life ==
Born on 11 November 1988 in Central Delhi, Chadha attended Modern School in New Delhi and earned his bachelor's degree in commerce from the University of Delhi in 2009. He then pursued Chartered Accountancy from the Institute of Chartered Accountants of India in 2011. In his early career, he worked with accountancy firms such as Deloitte and Grant Thornton.

== Political career ==
Chadha served as a founding member of the Aam Aadmi Party since its inception. Arvind Kejriwal encouraged him in drafting the Delhi Lokpal Bill in 2012, which constituted his maiden political endeavour. He established himself as the AAP's face on television and also became the youngest national spokesperson of the AAP and one of the youngest across parties.

When AAP won the 2015 Delhi Legislative Assembly election with a majority, Chadha, at the age of 26, was appointed AAP's national treasurer. In April 2018, the then Union Minister of Home Affairs, Rajnath Singh, whose party BJP is a staunch adversary of Chadha's AAP, terminated his appointment as an advisor to Manish Sisodia, along with that of 9 other advisors.

=== 2019 Lok Sabha election ===
In 2019, Chadha contested from the South Delhi Lok Sabha constituency for the 2019 Lok Sabha elections. He conceded victory to the BJP candidate Ramesh Bidhuri. Since the 1980s, South Delhi has been a BJP stronghold and represented by individuals like Madan Lal Khurana, Vijay Kumar Malhotra, Sushma Swaraj and Ramesh Bidhuri as well as Balraj Madhok of the Bharatiya Jana Sangh, the ideological and political predecessor of BJP.

In 2020, as a leader of AAP, Chadha was appointed AAP Punjab co-in-charge for the then-upcoming Punjab Legislative Assembly election in 2022, playing a crucial role in the party's eventual landslide victory in which it won 92 out of 117 seats.

=== MLA in the Delhi Legislative Assembly ===
In February 2020, Chadha contested from Rajinder Nagar in the 2020 Delhi Legislative Assembly election and won against BJP candidate RP Singh with a margin of 20,058 votes, polling 57.06% of the total votes.

=== MP in the Rajya Sabha ===
On 21 March 2022, AAP announced the nomination of Chadha and four other individuals as the Rajya Sabha members from Punjab for a six-year term starting in 2022. No opposition candidate opposed their election. This made him the youngest Indian Rajya Sabha MP ever at the age of 33. He was appointed as a member of the Parliament's Standing Committee on Finance in Rajya Sabha. The committee oversees the laws and policies drafted by three union ministries and the NITI Aayog.

In April 2022, Chadha claimed that Bharatiya Janata Party (BJP) settled Bangladeshi people and Rohingyas in Delhi and uses them to trigger riots.

Credited with the party's success in Punjab, Chadha was appointed co-in-charge for the 2022 Gujarat Legislative Assembly election on 18 September 2022. Following his appointment to the Rajya Sabha, he was designated the leader of the Aam Aadmi Party in the upper house.

In the wake of Sanjay Singh, who served as the floor leader of the AAP in the Rajya Sabha, becoming incapacitated owing to his inability to discharge his responsibilities while in judicial custody under politically-coloured charges, the party leader and Delhi Chief Minister Arvind Kejriwal requested the chairman of Rajya Sabha to appoint Chadha as AAP's interim leader of the House in early December 2023. However, the request was turned down, as the request reportedly was not in conformity with the applicable legal regime governed by The Leaders and Chief Whips of Recognised Parties and Groups in Parliament (Facilities) Act, 1998 and the Rules made thereunder.

Chadha is also known for his many public appearances, including being a panelist for the India Week 2025. Speaking on a panel about India in a Multipolar World, he described India's regional role as one of strategic restraint and active deterrence. Positioning India as a regional protector and pointed against future cross-border skirmishes. These comments were made soon after the Pahalgam Attack in 2025.

=== Advisor to the Chief Minister of Punjab ===
After AAP's victory in Punjab, Chief Minister Bhagwant Mann appointed Chadha as the chairman of an advisory panel. A plea challenging his appointment was struck down by the Punjab and Haryana High Court.

In May 2023, media reports emerged that Chadha's name was mentioned in Enforcement Directorate's (ED) second supplementary chargesheet in the money laundering case pertaining to the 2022 Delhi liquor policy case. Chadha immediately held a press conference in New Delhi to strongly refute the claims, calling the media reports “factually wrong” and part of a “propaganda” to harm his reputation and credibility.

In April 2024, Kunwar Vijay Pratap Singh, an Aam Aadmi Party (AAP) Member of the Legislative Assembly (MLA) from Amritsar North and former Indian Police Service (IPS) officer, made serious allegations against Chadha. During a rally in Amritsar, Singh accused Chadha of having close associations with at least two Punjab Police officers allegedly involved in supporting the drug trade in the city, describing them as Chadha's blue-eyed boys. In response to the controversy, the AAP suspended Kunwar Vijay Pratap Singh from the party for five years, citing anti-party activities.

=== Removal as Deputy Leader and defection to the Bharatiya Janata Party ===
On 2 April 2026, AAP removed Chadha from the post of its deputy leader in the Rajya Sabha, replacing him with Punjab MP Ashok Kumar Mittal. This was said to be the result of Chadha's prolonged absence from key party events and silence on sensitive issues.

Amid speculations, Chadha defected to the Bharatiya Janata Party on 24 April 2026, along with 6 other AAP MPs of the Rajya Sabha (including Mittal), despite having previously referred to the BJP as a party of illiterate goons and lumpen elements. The AAP criticised the defection, accusing the BJP of engaging in Operation Lotus.

== Positions held ==
Positions Held
Duration	Position
February 2020 – March 2022	Member, Delhi Legislative Assembly (Rajinder Nagar Assembly constituency)
February 2020 – March 2022	Chairman, Committee on Petitions; Delhi Legislative Assembly
February 2020 – March 2022	Chairman, Committee on Peace and Harmony; Delhi Legislative Assembly
February 2020 – March 2022	Vice Chairman; Delhi Jal Board
February 2020 – March 2022	Member, Business Advisory Committee; Delhi Legislative Assembly
February 2020 – March 2022	Member, Committee on Ethics; Delhi Legislative Assembly
February 2020 – March 2022	Member, Committee on Salary and Other Allowances of Members of Delhi Legislative Assembly
April 2022	Elected to Rajya Sabha
September 2022 – June 2024	Member, Committee on Finance
November 2022 – October 2024	Member, Committee on Subordinate Legislation
September 2024 – September 2025	Member, Committee on Housing and Urban Affairs
October 2024 – present	Member, Committee on Members of Parliament Local Area Development Scheme
October 2024 – present	Member, Committee on Papers Laid on the Table
October 2024 – present	Member, Consultative Committee for the Ministry of Defence
September 2025 – present	Member, Committee on External Affairs

== Personal life ==
Chadha got engaged to actress Parineeti Chopra, on 13 May 2023 at Kapurthala House in New Delhi. They were married on 24 September 2023 at The Leela Palace, Udaipur, Rajasthan in a traditional Hindu wedding ceremony. The couple welcomed their first child, a boy, on 19 October 2025.

In 2024, Chadha went to London to undergo a vitrectomy surgery. When asked about his long absence, his party colleague Saurabh Bhardwaj claimed that he could have lost eyesight if not for timely operation.

== Electoral performance ==
2019 Indian general elections: South Delhi
Party	Candidate	Votes	%	±%
BJP	Ramesh Bidhuri	687,014	56.58	▲11.41
AAP	Raghav Chadha	3,19,971	26.35	▼9.12
INC	Vijender Singh	1,64,613	13.56	▲2.20
NOTA	None of the Above	5,264	0.43	▲0.07
Majority		3,67,043	30.23	▲20.53
Turnout		12,14,545	58.75	▼4.22
BJP hold		Swing	▲11.41	

Delhi Assembly elections, 2020: Rajinder Nagar
Party	Candidate	Votes	%	±%
AAP	Raghav Chadha	59,135	57.06	+3.67
BJP	R. P. Singh	39,077	37.70	+1.76
INC	Rocky Tuseed	4,041	4.60	−4.00
NOTA	None of the above	467	0.45	+0.04
Majority		20,058	19.36	+1.91
Turnout		1,03,675	58.50	−9.80
Registered electors		1,77,867		
AAP hold		Swing	+3.67	

Rajya Sabha
Preceded by List	Member of Parliament in Rajya Sabha for Punjab; 2022–	Incumbent
State Legislative Assembly
Preceded by Vijender Garg Vijay (AAP)	Member of the Delhi Legislative Assembly from Rajinder Nagar Assembly constituency 2020–2022	Incumbent
