= Sandeep Pathak =

Indian politician (born 1979)

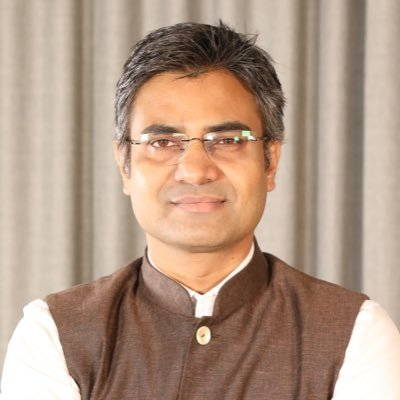

National General Secretary of Bharatiya Janata Party
- Incumbent
- Assumed office 18 August 2026
- President: Nitin Nabin

Member of Parliament, Rajya Sabha
- Incumbent
- Assumed office 10 April 2022
- Preceded by: Partap Singh Bajwa
- Constituency: Punjab

Personal details
- Born: 4 October 1979 (age 47) Mungeli, Chhattisgarh, India
- Party: Bharatiya Janata Party (since 2026)
- Other political affiliations: Aam Aadmi Party (2022-2026)
- Education: (BSc) (MSc); Guru Ghasidas University (PhD); University of Cambridge
- Known for: Aam Aadmi Party: Gujarat Incharge, Punjab and Himachal Pradesh Co-incharge; Ex-Professor: IIT Delhi; Research Associate: University of Oxford & MIT

Sandeep Pathak (born 4 October 1979) is an Indian academician-turned-politician from Bharatiya Janata Party and Rajya Sabha MP from Punjab since April 2022. He is a former assistant professor of IIT Delhi, former research associate at University of Oxford and MIT.

== Early life and education ==
He was born in Bataha village in Mungeli, Chhattisgarh to agriculturist parents. He completed his education till class 6th from his village and then moved to Bilaspur, Chhattisgarh to his aunt's house for further studies. He completed his BSc and MSc from the Guru Ghasidas University in Bilaspur, Chhattisgarh and then moved to Indian Institute of Chemical Technology, Hyderabad and National Chemical laboratory, Pune for further studies.

He then moved to the University of Cambridge to pursue Ph.D on high-temperature superconducting materials. Post that he pursued post-doctoral research as research associate in University of Oxford and MIT.

== Professional career ==
He joined the faculty of IIT Delhi in 2016. His area of work at the IIT is stated to be fabrication of perovskite-based photovoltaic devices, photo-physical properties and he has a number of research papers to his credit.

== Political career ==
He was recognized for his behind-the-scenes work in the 2022 Punjab elections, on behalf of the Aam Aadmi Party, and was nominated by the party as a candidate for a seat in the Rajya Sabha, to which he was elected, unopposed, in April 2022.

He was appointed Aam Aadmi Party's Incharge in Gujarat & Co-incharge in Punjab on 21 March 2022. Later he was appointed Co-incharge for Himachal Pradesh on 4 June 2022.

On 24 April 2026, he defected to the Bharatiya Janata Party along with a faction of 6 other Rajya Sabha MPs led by Raghav Chadha.

Soon thereafter, the Punjab Police filed two FIRs against Pathak in two different districts of Punjab, where the Punjab Police raided his house in Delhi but Pathak escaped from his house. Pathak and BJP have criticized these FIRs as being political vendetta. Pathak has also said he was completely unaware of the details of these FIRs and has moved Punjab and Haryana High Court for relief, where he has been provided Interim relief, and the matter is pending.

Rajya Sabha
Preceded by List	Member of Parliament in Rajya Sabha for Punjab; 2022 –	Incumbent
