= Ludhiana West Assembly constituency =

Legislative Assembly constituency in Punjab State, India

Coordinates: 30.9°N 75.79°E

Ludhiana West
- Constituency No. 64 for the Punjab Legislative Assembly

Constituency details
- Country: India
- State: Punjab
- District: Ludhiana
- Lok Sabha constituency: Ludhiana
- Total electors: 182,455
- Reservation: None

Member of Legislative Assembly
- 16th Punjab Legislative Assembly
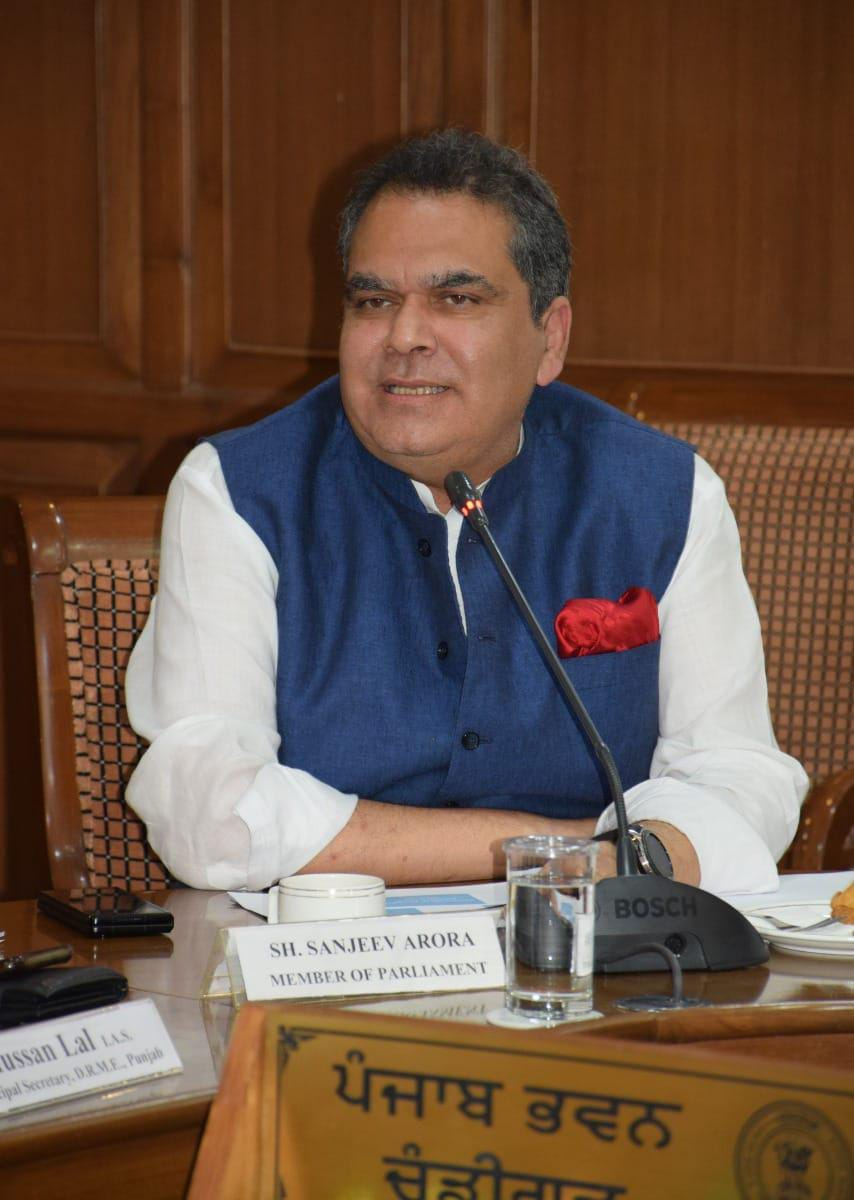
- Incumbent Sanjeev Arora
- Party: AAP
- Elected year: 2025

Ludhiana West Assembly constituency is one of the 117 Legislative Assembly constituencies of Punjab state in India. It is part of Ludhiana district.

== Members of the Legislative Assembly ==
Most successful parties from Ludhiana West Vidhan Sabha
1. INC (5 Times) (45.5%)
2. AAP (2 Times) (18.2%)
3. SAD (2 Times) (18.2%)
4. JP (1 Time) (9.09%)
5. INC (I) (1 Time) (9.09%)

Year	Member	Party
1977	A. Vishwanathan	Janata Party
1980	Joginder Pall Pandey	Indian National Congress (Indira)
1985	Harnam Dass Johar	Indian National Congress
1992	Harnam Dass Johar	Indian National Congress
1997	Maheshinder Singh Grewal	Shiromani Akali Dal
2002	Harnam Dass Johar	Indian National Congress
2007	Harish Rai Dhanda	Shiromani Akali Dal
2012	Bharat Bhushan Ashu	Indian National Congress
2017	Bharat Bhushan Ashu	Indian National Congress
2022	Gurpreet Gogi	Aam Aadmi Party
2025^	Sanjeev Arora	Aam Aadmi Party

^By-election

== Election results ==
=== 2027 ===
Punjab Assembly election, 2027: Ludhiana West
Party	Candidate	Votes	%	±%
AAP	Sanjeev Arora			
AD (WPD)				New entry
INC				
BSP				
SAD				
BJP				
NOTA	None of the above			
Majority				
Turnout				

=== 2025 By-Poll ===
2025 By-election: Ludhiana West
Party	Candidate	Votes	%	±%
AAP	Sanjeev Arora	35,179	39.01	▲4.21
INC	Bharat Bhushan Ashu	24,542	27.22	▼1.08
BJP	Jiwan Gupta	20,323	22.53	▼1.67
SAD	Parupkar Singh Ghumman	8,203	9.09	▲0.39
NOTA	None of the Above	793	0.88	▲0.28
Majority		10,637	11.80	
Turnout		90,160	51.33	▼12.96
Registered electors		182,545		
AAP hold		Swing		

=== 2022 ===
Punjab Assembly election, 2022: Ludhiana West
Party	Candidate	Votes	%	±%
AAP	Gurpreet Singh Gogi	40,443	34.80	▲10.01
INC	Bharat Bhushan Ashu	32,931	28.30	▼26.56
BJP	Bikram Singh Sidhu	28,107	24.20	▲5.57
SAD	Maheshindar Singh Grewal	10,072	8.70	New
NOTA	None of the above	1,173	0.60	▼0.28
Majority		7,512	6.40	▼23.4
Turnout		1,17,360	64.29	▼5.08
Registered electors		182,545		
AAP gain from INC		Swing		

=== 2017 ===
Punjab Assembly election, 2017: Ludhiana West
Party	Candidate	Votes	%	±%
INC	Bharat Bhushan Ashu	66,627	54.86	▼7.94
AAP	Ahbaab Singh Grewal	30,106	24.79	New
BJP	Kamal Chatly	22,620	18.63	▼11.47
NOTA	None of the above	1,066	0.88	
Majority		36,521	29.81	▼2.79
Turnout		122,721	69.37	▼0.33
Registered electors		176,915		
INC hold		Swing		

=== 2012 ===
Punjab Assembly election, 2017: Ludhiana West
Party	Candidate	Votes	%	±%
INC	Bharat Bhushan Ashu	69,125	62.8	
BJP	Rajinder Bhandari	33,203	30.1	
CPI	Dharampaul Maur	5,264	4.8	
Majority		35,922	32.6	
Turnout		110,061	69.70	
Registered electors		157,934		
INC gain from SAD		Swing		

== Opinion Polls ==
=== Pre Poll ===
==== Punjab Assembly By Election (2025) - Ludhiana West ====
Date published	Polling agency						Lead
Date published	Polling agency	INC	AAP	SAD	BJP	Others	Lead
17 June 2025	People's Insight	22.81%	39.23%	9.65%	20.96%	7.35%	16.42%

=== Exit Poll ===
==== Punjab Assembly By Election (2025) - Ludhiana West ====
Date published	Polling agency						Lead
Date published	Polling agency	INC	AAP	SAD	BJP	Others	Lead
19 June 2025	People's Insight	23.52%	39.8%	7.91%	20.45%	8.32%	16.28%

== See also ==
- List of constituencies of the Punjab Legislative Assembly
- Ludhiana district
