= Ramakant Goswami =

Indian politician

Member of the Delhi Assembly for Rajendra Nagar
- In office December 2008 – February 2014

Personal details
- Born: 29 October 1944 (age 81) Lahore, British India
- Party: Congress
- Spouse: Chander Kanta Goswami
- Children: One Daughter and One Son
- Education: Kurukshetra University; Bharatiya Vidya Bhavan
- Occupation: Journalist, lecturer

Ramakant Goswami (born 29 October 1944) was a member of the Legislative Assembly of Delhi from Rajendra Nagar constituency. He was the Minister of Industry, Labour, Election, Law & Justice and Parliament Affairs, Transport and Law Govt. of NCT, Delhi. He was also a member of the Business Advisory Committee of Delhi Government since 2002.

== Early life ==
He was born to Dr Girdhari Lal Goswami and Dev Rani Goswami in British India. After the partition of India, he and his family migrated to India. He did his post-graduate in Hindi from Kurukshetra University and followed this with a diploma in journalism from Bharatiya Vidya Bhavan. He was an active journalist for thirty years and worked as lecturer at S.D. College in Ambala. He was an active sportsman during his college days.

== Political career ==
He entered in active politics in 1998 for the Delhi State Assembly Elections and contested for Congress Party for the seat of MLA from Patel Nagar constituency, he won and repeated his success again in the year 2003. In the 2008 elections, he was nominated from Rajendra Nagar constituency. He won the seat from the Bhartiya Janata Party candidate Asha Yogi by 5000 votes.

== Positions held ==
He has served on several major positions of many organisations and within Congress, some of them are:-

- General Secretary — Delhi Pradesh Congress Committee
- General Secretary — All India Sanatan Dharam Pratinidhi Sammelan
- General Secretary — All India Sanskrit Sahitya Sammelan
- Parliamentary Secretary to Chief Minister
- Chief Whip of Congress Legislative Party

== See also ==
- Legislative Assembly of Delhi
- 2008 Delhi state assembly elections
