= Raghbir Singh Panjhazari =

Indian politician (1914–1999)

Member of Parliament, Rajya Sabha
- In office 1954-1972
- Constituency: Punjab

Personal details
- Born: 26 April 1914
- Died: 19 March 1999 (aged 84)
- Party: Indian National Congress
- Spouse: K Manjit Kaur

Sardar Raghbir Singh Panjhazari (1914-1999) was an Indian politician. He was a Member of Parliament, representing Punjab in the Rajya Sabha the upper house of India's Parliament as a member of the Indian National Congress.
