= Kanwaljit Singh (politician) =

Indian politician

Capt. Kanwaljit Singh

MLA Punjab (India)
- Constituency: Banur

General Secretary Shiromani Akali Dal

Home minister Punjab (India)

Finance minister Punjab (India)

Cooperation minister Punjab (India)

Personal details
- Born: Kanwaljit Singh; 1 September 1942 Nabha (Patiala)
- Died: 29 March 2009 (aged 66) PGIMER, Chandigarh
- Resting place: Salana, Khanna
- Party: Shiromani Akali Dal
- Spouse: Sarabjit Kaur
- Children: Jasjit Singh Bunny (son)

Military service
- Allegiance: Indian Army
- Rank: Captain

Capt. Kanwaljit Singh (1 September 1942 – 29 March 2009) was a Punjab Cooperation Minister and Shiromani Akali Dal's, General Secretary. He was injured in a road accident near Kharar on 29 March 2009 and died at PGIMER Chandigarh on the same day.

== Biography ==
Kanwaljit Singh was born to Dara Singh in Nabha.

A former army captain (short service commission), Singh represented the Banur assembly segment in the Punjab assembly, and was elected a Member of Legislative Assembly (MLA) three times. He was one of the senior-most Akali leaders in the Parkash Singh Badal-led government, his first stint being as State Home Minister in the then Surjit Singh Barnala Ministry in the 1980s.

At the time of his death, he was in charge of the Cooperation, Defence Service Welfare, Removal of Grievances, Pensions & Welfare of Pensioners Wing of the Finance Department.

== Positions held ==
- Cabinet minister (Cooperation, Defence Service Welfare, Removal of Grievances, Pensions & Welfare of Pensioners Wing of the Finance Department)
- Minister for Finance and Planning
- Minister of State for Home Affairs
- Vice-Chairman, Punjab State Planning Board
- Chairman, Empowered Committee to facilitate the growth of social and economic infrastructure
- Member, Empowered Committee of State Finance Ministers
- Vice-Chairman, Punjab Infrastructure Development Board

== Personal life ==
His son Jasjit Singh Bunny resigned from primary membership of Shiromani Akali Dal on 3 April 2009 and announced his decision to contest as an Independent from the Patiala Lok Sabha constituency.

Bunny also resigned as chairman of the Punjab Cooperative Bank, a post which he got by virtue of his father being the cooperation minister, despite losing the 2007 Assembly election from Kharar.

It was speculated that Sukhbir Singh Badal's statement that, "there was no need to make any further adjustment for Bunny" was responsible for Bunny's sudden outburst.
