= Sukhbans Kaur Bhinder =

Indian politician

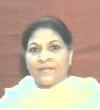
Sukhbans Kaur Binder

Sukhbans Kaur Bhinder (1943–2006) was an Indian politician belonging to the Indian National Congress, who was the only woman in the country to become an MP six times – five times of the Lok Sabha and one of the Rajya Sabha. She was elected to the Lok Sabha from Gurdaspur in Punjab in 1980, 1985, 1989, 1992 and 1996.

== Early life and education ==
Sukhbans, daughter of S. Arjan Singh Hundal, was born on 14 September 1943 in Layalpur (now in Pakistan). She went to school at Jesus and Mary Convent, Mussoorie and later on studied at Panjab University, Chandigarh. She graduated with a Bachelor of Arts.

== Career ==
Sukhbans was an Agriculturist and Political and Social Worker. She was elected to the Seventh Lok Sabha in 1980 for the first time. She was re-elected to the Eighth Lok Sabha in 1985 for the second time and then in 1989 to the Ninth Lok Sabha, in 1992 to the Tenth Lok Sabha and in 1996 to the Eleventh Lok Sabha. She was defeated by actor-turned politician Vinod Khanna of BJP during the Lok Sabha polls in 1997.

She was nominated to the Rajya Sabha in 2005.

She was also the member of the Joint Committee to examine the Dowry Prohibition, 1961 from 1981–82 and Union Minister of State, Civil Aviation and Tourism in the Department of Tourism from July 1992 to May 1996.

She was interested in social work and upliftment of women. She also worked as an executive with ITDC and East India Hotels and underwent training as Hotel Executive in Paris.

== Personal life ==
Sukhbans was married to former IPS officer Pritam Singh Bhinder on 12 October 1961 and together they have two daughters. She lived in Gurdaspur, Punjab. She died at the age of 63 on 15 December 2006 as she had been suffering from gastric ailments since several months.
