= Raj Mohinder Singh Majitha =

Indian politician

Shri Raj Mohinder Singh Majitha is an Indian politician. He is from the Shiromani Akali Dal party and was a Member of the Parliament of India representing Punjab in the Rajya Sabha, the upper house of the Indian Parliament.
