= Harvendra Singh Hanspal =

Indian politician (1938–2024)

Member of Parliament, Rajya Sabha
- In office 1980–1992
- Constituency: Punjab

Personal details
- Born: 4 May 1938 Bathanwala, Sialkot District, Punjab Province, British India (now Punjab, Pakistan)
- Died: 20 December 2024 (aged 86) New Delhi, India
- Party: Aam Aadmi Party
- Other political affiliations: Indian National Congress
- Spouse: Charanjit Kaur Hanspal
- Children: 3

Harvendra Singh Hanspal (4 May 1938 – 20 December 2024) was an Indian politician. He was a Member of Parliament, representing Punjab in the Rajya Sabha the upper house of India's Parliament as a member of the Indian National Congress. He has been representing as President Namdhari Darbar International Organisation since 1970. Represented Indian Government in the UNO in the year 1981. Chairman of the House Committee of Rajya Sabha from the year 1988 to 1992. Appointed Chief Whip of the Rajya Sabha for the period of 1990-1992. Became President Punjab Pradesh Congress Committee from 2002-2005. Appointed Member of National Commission for Minorities period 2009-2012. Currently he is Chairman Punjab Energy Development Agency, Chairman World Punjabi Conference. He was a member of Aam Aadmi Party. Hanspal died in New Delhi on 20 December 2024, at the age of 86.
