= Kapurthala House =

Coordinates: 28.605873°N 77.223630°E

- Interactive map of the Kapurthala House area

General information
- Construction started: 1603; 423 years ago
- Completed: 1611; 415 years ago
- Owner: Government of Punjab, India (present)

Technical details
- Floor area: 1,000 m^{2} (11,000 sq ft)
- Lifts/elevators: 5

Other information
- Number of rooms: 66

Kapurthala House is the former residence of the Maharaja of the Kapurthala princely state. The building is located close to Connaught Place in Delhi.

It is in close proximity to 'The Chambers-Taj', Motilal Nehru Marg and Aurangzeb Road. It is used by the Government of Punjab and is the residence of the Chief Minister whenever they visit the national capital.

== History ==
Kapurthala House was commissioned in 1603 by the Ahluwalia rulers of Kapurthala as their Delhi capital residence and completed in 1611, under Maharaja Paramjit Singh. After Indian Independence, the property was requisitioned under the Delhi Premises (Requisition and Acquisition) Act, 1947, on 17 June 1950, and formally taken over by the Government of India on 4 December 1950 for ₹1.5 lakh. In August 2019, the Delhi High Court upheld the Punjab Government’s title to the building, confirming its continued use as the official residence for the state’s chief minister when in New Delhi.

== Architecture ==
Kapurthala House is a two‑storey mansion encompasses 66 rooms over approximately 11,000 sq ft, laid out around a central courtyard and approached via a broad, colonnaded veranda. Its design draws on French Renaissance forms, evident in the steeply pitched hipped roofs, dormered attic windows, and quoined corners, blended with Indo‑Colonial elements such as deep overhanging eaves and jharokha style balconies. Constructed of lime‑mortar brick and finished with plastered facades, the building originally featured marble floors, carved wooden doors, and imported wrought‑iron balustrades. several elevators (now numbered five) were later installed to serve its upper level when repurposed for government use.
