= Bhupinder Singh Brar =

Indian politician

Bhupinder Singh Brar (1 July 1926 – 15 March 1995) was a politician from the Indian state of Punjab. He represented Punjab in the Rajya Sabha, the Council of States of India's parliament from 1967 to 1970.

Singh had a wife, Prakash Brar, with whom he had one son and one daughter.
