= Anup Singh (politician) =

Indian politician

Dr. Anup Singh (5 March 1903 – 28 January 1969) was an Indian politician from Punjab belonging to the Indian National Congress party. He received his doctorate from Harvard University.

He was a member of Rajya Sabha for four terms: 3 April 1952 to 2 April 1954, 3 April 1954 to 2 April 1960, 3 April 1962 to 22 November 1962 and 3 April 1964 to 28 January 1969.

During 1960 he was Chairman of the Punjab Public Service Commission. He wrote a book entitled Nehru: Rising Star of India.

He is survived by Shrimati Iqbal Kaur and one daughter.
