= Shamsher Singh Dullo =

Indian politician (born 1947)

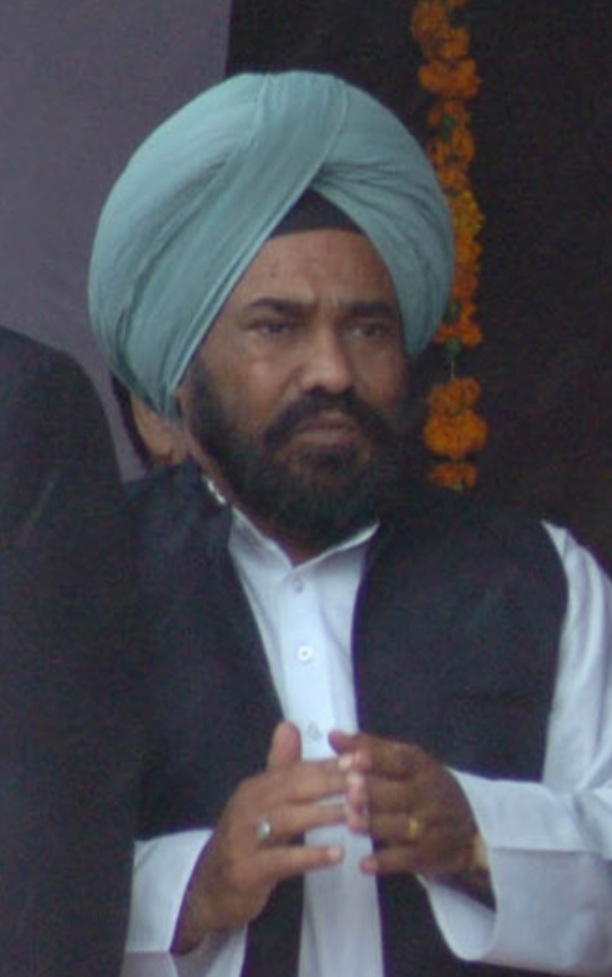

Rajya Sabha MP from Punjab
- In office 9 April 2016 – 22 March 2022
- Preceded by: M.S.Gill
- Succeeded by: Ashok Mittal
- Constituency: Punjab

Personal details
- Born: 6 December 1947 (age 78) Khanna, Punjab, India
- Party: Indian National Congress
- Spouse: Harbans Kaur
- Children: Bandeep Singh Dullo
- Education: Punjab University, Chandigarh
- Occupation: Politician

Shamsher Singh Dullo is an Indian politician affiliated with the Indian National Congress (INC), known for his extensive service in Punjab's political landscape. He served as a Member of Parliament, Rajya Sabha.

== Early life ==
Shamsher Singh Dullo was born in Ramdasia Sikh family to Inder Singh Dullo and Satnam Kaur at Khanna, Punjab. He did B.A and LL.B from A.S. College, Khanna and Law College, Panjab University (Chandigarh) and practiced law from the Punjab and Haryana High Court.

His son Bandeep Singh Dullo and wife Harbans Kaur are members of Aam Admi Party. She was also an MLA from Khanna.

== Politics ==
He was first elected as a Member of the Punjab Legislative Assembly (MLA) from Khanna in 1980 and again in 1992, during which he also served as the Minister of State for Excise and Taxation in the Punjab government.

In 1999, Shamsher Singh Dullo was elected to the 13th Lok Sabha from Ropar Constituency, represented as Member of Parliament in the Indian Parliament.

He is former president of Punjab Pradesh Congress Committee and Metropolitan Council of Khanna. Also served as director in Bank of India and was member of senate in Guru Nanak Dev University, Amritsar.

In 2016, he was nominated as Rajya Sabha candidate from Punjab in the biennial elections.

== Advocacy & Public Work ==
He spoke up in Parliament about liquor mafia operations in Punjab, demanding investigations into tragedies caused by spurious liquor and seeking accountability. He also raised an issues related to social justice and representation, including discussions about giving leadership opportunities to Hindu, SC, or BC communities (besides the dominant group) in Punjab politics.

== See also ==
- Chamar
- Ravidassia
