= Rajendra Nagar, Delhi =

Rajendra Nagar
- Neighborhood of Delhi
- Location in Delhi, India
- Coordinates: 28.637235°N 77.182364°E
- Country: India
- State: Delhi
- District: Central Delhi

Languages
  - Official: Hindi Punjabi
- Time zone: UTC+5:30 (IST)
- Planning agency: MCD

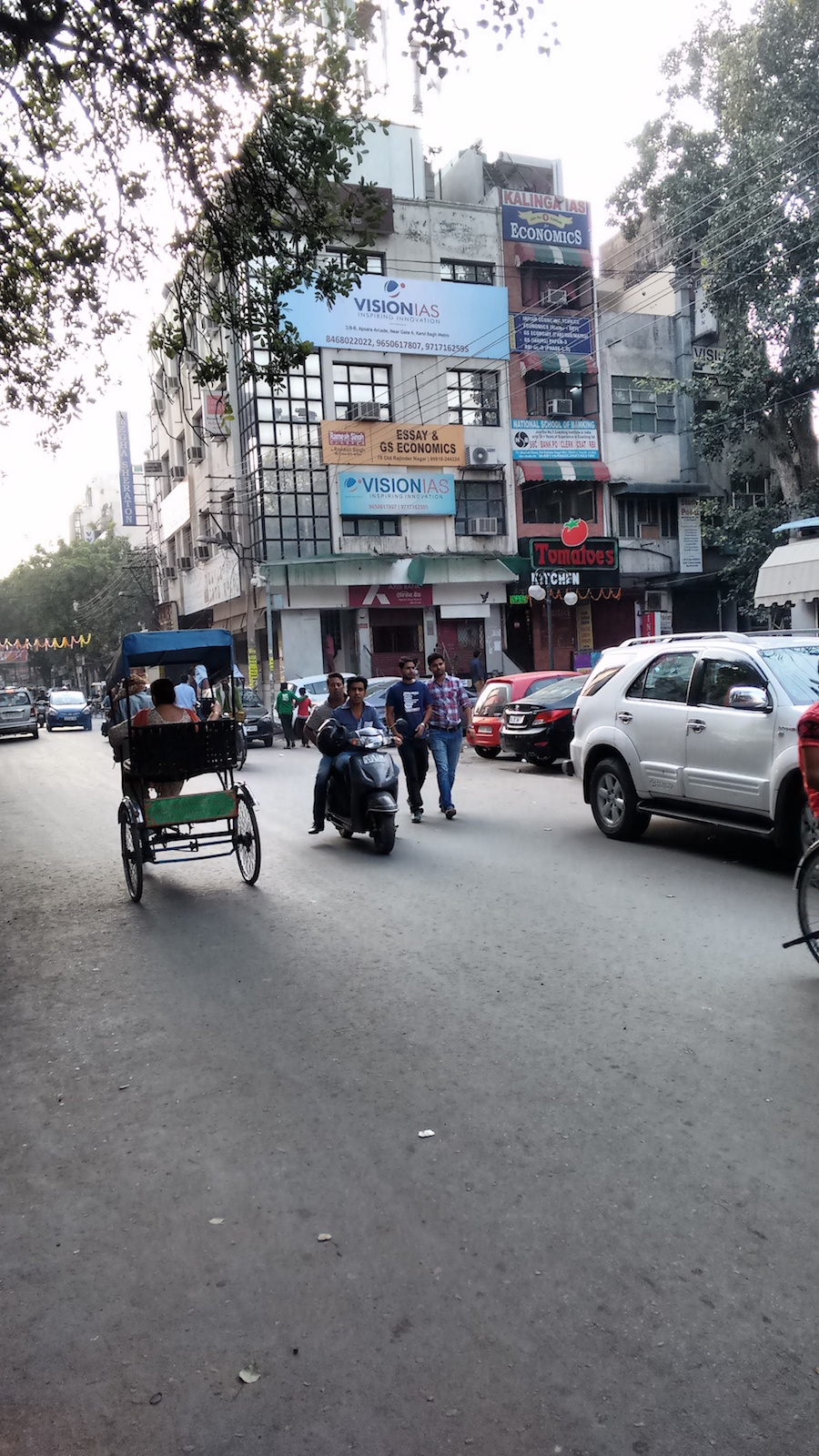
Old Rajendra Nagar Delhi

Rajendra Nagar (often spelled unofficially as 'Rajender Nagar' or 'Rajinder Nagar') is a residential colony in Central Delhi, Delhi, India. The name comes from Dr. Rajendra Prasad, the first president of India. It is bordered by the Central Ridge Protected Forest on the east and south, IARI on the west, and Karol Bagh on the north. It is a constituency in the Legislative Assembly of Delhi. The current Councillor for the Municipal Corporation of Delhi is Aarti Chawla of Aam Aadmi Party (Ward No.102N).

== Overview ==
Like most of the colonies developed in the 1950s, Rajendra Nagar was primarily a Punjabi refugee colony which came up during the years after the partition of India in 1947, when several such residential neighborhoods sprang up in the Delhi area, including other examples such as Lajpat Nagar and Patel Nagar.

Rajender Nagar was developed on land acquired from the villages of Shadipur, Khampur, and neighboring settlements.

Rajender Nagar benefits from links with the Delhi metro. Shankar road divides the Rajendra Nagar into New and Old Rajendra Nagar. Old Rajendra Nagar touches Karol Bagh, which is famous for shopping and eating. New Rajendra Nagar is between Old Rajendra Nagar and Ridge, and is also adjacent to Connaught Place, with Talkatora stadium a short walk away. The locality is posh with many parks in New Rajendra Nagar. Central Park in New Rajendra Nagar is called Nehru Park.

== Administration ==
It is part of the Rajinder Nagar Assembly constituency.

== Major Landmarks ==
New Era Public School.

== Coaching industry ==
Rajendra Nagar is home to many coaching institutes. It is one of the two education hubs in Delhi for government job aspirants (the other being Mukherjee Nagar).

However, the striking difference between these two locations is the demographics of students. While, majority of student-population in Rajendra Nagar comprises those preparing for exams conducted by UPSC (and usually in English medium), Mukherjee Nagar is dominated by a mix of students preparing (i) either for exams conducted by SSC (like CGL and CHSL) (ii) or for civil services exams in Hindi medium.

The streets are filled with sprawling book stores, libraries, rental housing and eateries an ancillary business along with the coaching industry.

Coaching industry of Rajendra Nagar and other parts of Delhi were severely impacted in 2020 because of the COVID-19 pandemic.

== Notable people ==
Bollywood actor Shahrukh Khan was born here in 1965 at the Talwar Nursing Home[Old Rajendra Nagar], and lived there for more than two decades while studying in Hansraj College and acting in TV series Fauji (1988), Circus (1989) and Dil Darya, before moving to Mumbai in 1991 to pursue a career in films.

- Bollywood singer Jaspinder Narula was born and raised here.
- Shakti Kapoor, Bollywood star, was also born and raised here.

Other known residents included Dilip Kumar, the Bollywood star who lived here for some years, Balraj Madhok a politician of the 1960s, Bollywood actor Shiney Ahuja, actress Divya Dutta and documentary filmmaker Avijit Mukul Kishore. Indian batsman Gautam Gambhir is a resident.
