= Telecom Advisory Committee =

Telecom Advisory Committees (TAC)
- Emblem of India

Agency overview
- Jurisdiction: Minister of Communications and Information Technology (India) Republic of India
- Headquarters: Sanchar Bhawan New Delhi
- Minister responsible: Ravi Shankar Prasad
- Website: dot.gov.in

Telecom Advisory Committee (TAC) is a high level Indian government body made up of members of parliament and other members nominated by the Ministry of Communications and Information Technology to address issues concerning telecommunication in India. Looked upon as a privileged panel, the Telecom Advisory Committees, constituted by the Ministry of Communications and Information Technology (India) of the Government of India to serve as a vital feedback mechanism for improvement of services in the Telecommunications sector by the Department of Telecommunications.

== Ministers ==
- Shri Manoj Sinha Incumbent
- Shri Ravi Shankar Prasad 2014
- Shri Kapil Sibal 19.01.2011 to 26.05.2014
- Dr. Manmohan Singh 15.11.2010 to 15.11.2010
- Shri A. Raja 16.05.2007 to 14.11.2010
- Shri Dayanidhi Maran 23.05.2004 to 15.05.2007
- Shri Arun Shourie 29.01.2003 to 22.05.2004
- Shri Pramod Mahajan 02.09.2001 to 28.01.2003
- Shri Ram Vilas Paswan 13.10.1999 to 01.09.2001

== Departments ==
- Department of Telecommunications
- Department of Electronics and Information Technology
- Department of Posts
- MTNLWebsite list of TAC members

== Department of Telecommunications ==
Also known as the Door Sanchar Vibhag, this department concerns itself with policy, licensing and coordination matters relating to telegraphs, telephones, wireless, data, facsimile and telematic services and other like forms of communications. It also looks into the administration of laws with respect to any of the matters specified, namely:

- The Indian Telegraph Act, 1885 (13 of 1885)
- The Indian Wireless Telegraphy Act, 1940 (17 of 1933)
- The Telecom Regulatory Authority of India Act, 1997 (24 of 1997)

== Public Sector Units ==
- Bharat Sanchar Nigam Limited (BSNL)
- Indian Telephone Industries Limited (ITI)
- Bharat Broadband Network (BBNL)
- Telecommunications Consultants India Limited (TCIL)

== Mobile phone service operators in India ==
- Aircel
- Bharti Airtel
- BSNL
- Idea Cellular
- MTNL
- MTS India
- Reliance Communications
- Tata DoCoMo
- Telenor India
- Videocon Mobile Service
- Vodafone India

== See also ==
- Centre for Excellence in Telecom Technology and Management
- Telecommunications in India
- Bharat Sanchar Nigam Limited
- MTNL Perfect Health Mela

== List of TAC Members ==
A
- Anandrao Vithoba Adsul
- Hansraj Gangaram Ahir
- Ramdas Athawale
- Akhil Gupta
- Aslam Khan

B

- E. T. Mohammed Basheer
- Shadi Lal Batra
- Bodh Singh Bhagat
- Subhash Bhamre
- Balwinder Singh Bhunder
- Ranjit Singh Brahmpura

C

- Prem Singh Chandumajra
- Santokh Singh Chaudhary
- Dushyant Chautala
- Jitendra Choudhury

D

- Dhruv Kapoor
- Husain Dalwai
- Sankar Prasad Datta
- Anil Desai
- Dharambir
- Rajkumar Dhoot
- Sanjay Shamrao Dhotre
- Jyoti Dhurve

G

- Dharamvir Gandhi
- Ashok Sekhar Ganguly
- Ganga Prasad Ram Narayan Tripathi
- Sher Singh Ghubaya
- Sanjay gupta
- Naresh Gujral
- Gaurav Sharma

H

- Deepender Singh Hooda

J

- Prataprao Ganpatrao Jadhav

K

- P. Karunakaran
- Rattan Lal Kataria
- Chandrakant Khaire
- Avinash Rai Khanna
- Vinod Khanna
- Kirron Kher
- Gajanan Kirtikar
- Ashwani Kumar
- Selja Kumari

L

- Sadashiv Lokhande

M

- Bhagwant Mann
- Majeed Memon

N

- Shantaram Naik
- C.P. Narayanan

P

- Praful Patel
- Rajni Patil
- Nanabhau Patole
- Sharad Pawar

R

- Poonam Mahajan
- Sanjay Raut
- Rekha
- Charanjeet Singh Rori
- C. L. Ruala

S

- A. Sampath
- Vijay Sampla
- P. A. Sangma
- Alok Sanjar
- T. N. Seema
- Arvind Kumar Sharma
- Gopal Shetty
- Rahul Shewale
- Rajeev Shukla
- Sukhdev Singh Dhindsa
- Amarinder Singh
- Sadhu Singh
- Virendra Singh (Mirzapur)
- Raj Kumar Saini
- Wansuk Syiem

T

- Shashi Tharoor
- Ronald Sapa Tlau
- D. P. Tripathi
- K. T. S. Tulsi

V

- Rajan Vichare
- Vinod Gupta
