= Telephone Advisory Committees =

Telephone / Telecom Advisory Committees (TAC)
- Emblem of India

Agency overview
- Jurisdiction: Minister of Communications and Information Technology (India) Republic of India
- Headquarters: Sanchar Bhawan New Delhi
- Minister responsible: Manoj Sinha
- Website: dot.gov.in

Telephone / Telecom Advisory Committees (TAC) was a high level Indian government body made up of members of parliament and other members nominated by the Ministry of Communications and Information Technology to address issues concerning telecommunication in India. Looked upon as a privileged panel, the Telephone Advisory Committees, constituted by the Ministry of Communications and Information Technology (India) of the Government of India to serve as a vital feedback mechanism for improvement of services in the Telecommunications sector by the Department of Telecommunications

These Committees were abolished in 2001.

== Ministers ==
- Shri Jyotiraditya Scindia 10.06.2024-Present
- Shri Ashwini Vaishnaw 08.07.2021 to 10.06.2024
- Shri Ravi Shankar Prasad 30.05.2019 to 07.07.2021
- Shri Manoj Sinha 06.07.2016 to 30.05.2019
- Shri Ravi Shankar Prasad 26.05.2014 to 05.07.2016
- Shri Kapil Sibal 19.01.2011 to 26.05.2014
- Dr. Manmohan Singh 15.11.2010 to 15.11.2010
- Shri A. Raja 16.05.2007 to 14.11.2010
- Shri Dayanidhi Maran 23.05.2004 to 15.05.2007
- Shri Arun Shourie 29.01.2003 to 22.05.2004
- Shri Pramod Mahajan 02.09.2001 to 28.01.2003
- Shri Ram Vilas Paswan 13.10.1999 to 01.09.2001

== Departments ==
- Department of Telecommunications
- Department of Electronics and Information Technology
- Department of Posts
- MTNL

== Department of Telecommunications ==
Also known as the Door Sanchar Vibhag, this department concerns itself with policy, licensing and coordination matters relating to telegraphs, telephones, wireless, data, facsimile and telematic services and other like forms of communications. It also looks into the administration of laws with respect to any of the matters specified, namely:

- The Indian Telegraph Act, 1885 (13 of 1885)
- The Indian Wireless Telegraphy Act, 1940 (17 of 1933)
- The Telecom Regulatory Authority of India Act, 1997 (24 of 1997)

== Public Sector Units ==
- Bharat Sanchar Nigam Limited (BSNL)
- Indian Telephone Industries Limited (ITI)
- Bharat Broadband Network (BBNL)
- Telecommunications Consultants India Limited (TCIL)

== Mobile phone service operators in India ==
- Airtel
- BSNL
- Jio
- MTNL
- Vi

== See also ==
- Centre for Excellence in Telecom Technology and Management
- Telecommunications in India
- Bharat Sanchar Nigam Limited
- MTNL Perfect Health Mela

== List of TAC Members ==
A
- Akhil Gupta
- Alok kumar
- Anandrao Vithoba Adsul
- Hansraj Gangaram Ahir
- Ramdas Athawale
- Alok Goswami
- Aslam Khan

B

- Kuldeep Samendra Bhakar
- E. T. Mohammed Basheer
- Shadi Lal Batra
- Bodh Singh Bhagat
- Subhash Bhamre
- Balwinder Singh Bhunder
- Ranjit Singh Brahmpura
- Bhupinder Singh Maddy

C

- Prem Singh Chandumajra
- Chandra Bhan Singh
- Santokh Singh Chaudhary
- Dushyant Chautala
- Jitendra Choudhury

D

- Dhruv Kapoor
- Dilshad Hussain
- Daksh Jain
- Husain Dalwai
- Sankar Prasad Datta
- Anil Desai
- Dharambir
- Rajkumar Dhoot
- Sanjay Shamrao Dhotre
- Jyoti Dhurve

G

- Dharamvir Gandhi
- Ganga Prasad Ram Narayan Tripathi
- Heena Gavit
- Sher Singh Ghubaya
- M. S. Gill
- Naresh Gujral
- Gaurav Sharma

H

- Deepender Singh Hooda
- Ahmed Hassan Imran

J

- Prataprao Ganpatrao Jadhav

K

- P. Karunakaran
- Rattan Lal Kataria
- Chandrakant Khaire
- Avinash Rai Khanna
- Vinod Khanna
- Krishna kumar khelwar
- Gajanan Kirtikar
- Ashwani Kumar
- Selja Kumari

L

- Sadashiv Lokhande
- Lokesh Kumar Chahar

M

- Bhagwant Mann
- Majeed Memon
- Manoj Kumar Singhraj
- Shahid Siddiqui

N

- Shantaram Naik
- C.P. Narayanan
- Nanigopal Bhattacharjee

P

- Praful Patel
- Rajni Patil
- Nanabhau Patole
- Sharad Pawar

R

- Poonam Mahajan
- Sanjay Raut
- Rekha
- Charanjeet Singh Rori
- C. L. Ruala

S

- A. Sampath
- Vijay Sampla
- P. A. Sangma
- Alok Sanjar
- T. N. Seema
- Arvind Kumar Sharma
- Gopal Shetty
- Rahul Shewale
- Rajeev Shukla
- Sukhdev Singh Dhindsa
- Amarinder Singh
- Sadhu Singh
- Virendra Singh (Mirzapur)
- Raj Kumar Saini
- Wansuk Syiem

T

- Shashi Tharoor
- Ronald Sapa Tlau
- D. P. Tripathi
- K. T. S. Tulsi

V

- Rajan Vichare
- Vicky Khurana
- Vinod Gupta
