= Gujral =

Gujral is an Indian (Khatri) surname.

== Notable people ==
Notable people with the surname include:

- Avtar Narain Gujral (died 1976), Indian politician, father of I. K. Gujral
- Feroze Gujral (born 1965), Indian model, daughter-in-law of Satish Gujral
- Inder Kumar Gujral (1919–2012), Indian politician, 12th Prime Minister of India
- Kundan Lal Gujral (1902–1997), Indian chef and restaurateur
- Monish Gujral (born 1965), Indian chef and author
- Man Mohan Singh Gujral (1919–2015), Indian judge
- Namrata Singh Gujral (born 1976), Indian-American actress
- Naresh Gujral (born 1948), Indian politician, son of I. K. Gujral
- Pavleen Gujral (born 1983), Indian actress
- Raseel Gujral Ansal (born 1965), Indian interior designer
- Satish Gujral (1925–2020), Indian artist and sculptor, brother of I. K. Guhral
- Sheila Gujral (1924–2011), Indian writer and poet, wife of I. K. Gujral

== See also ==
- Gujral ministry
