= Rupa M. Marak =

Indian politician

Member of the Meghalaya Legislative Assembly
- Incumbent
- Assumed office 2023
- Preceded by: James Sangma
- Constituency: Dadenggre

Personal details
- Party: Trinamool Congress (until 2026); Mamata All India Trinamool Congress (from 2026)
- Education: Tura Government College
- Profession: Politician

Rupa M. Marak (born 1987) is an Indian politician from Meghalaya. He is a member of the Meghalaya Legislative Assembly representing the Mamata All India Trinamool Congress. He was first elected in the 2023 Meghalaya Legislative Assembly election from the Dadenggre Assembly constituency, which is reserved for Scheduled Tribe community, in West Garo Hills district.

== Early life and education ==
Marak is from Bolchugre village, Dadenggre post, West Garo Hills district, Meghalaya. He is the son of Durga Singh. He completed his B.A. in 2012 at Tura Government College, Tura, which is affiliated with North Eastern Hills University.

== Career ==
Marak won the Dadenggre Assembly constituency representing the All India Trinamool Congress in the 2023 Meghalaya Legislative Assembly election. He polled 15,702 votes and defeated his nearest rival, James Sangma of the National People's Party, by a margin of 18 votes.
