= Ganga Saran =

Indian politician in British India and later Pakistan and India

Rai Bahadur Ganga Saran was an Indian trade unionist and politician from Punjab. He was a member of the Punjab Provincial Assembly (British India) and both the Constituent Assembly of India and the Constituent Assembly of Pakistan.

In the 1946 Punjab Provincial Assembly election, Saran won as an independent candidate from a non-constituency seat reserved for Punjab Trade and Labour Unions. (Note: Securing 552 votes, Saran barely scraped through against R.S. Ramjawaya Kapur, another independent candidate. The incumbent legislator Lala Sita Ram managed a paltry 51 votes.) He was a member of the National Liberal Federation of India. Saran intended to stay in Pakistan after Pakistan, and became a member of the Punjab Provincial Assembly. (Note: All members of the '46 legislature, who won from what was now Pakistan's share of Punjab, were appointed to the assembly until re-elections were held in January, 1949.) On 4 July 1947, he was elected by the non-Muslim members of the (yet-undivided) Punjab Assembly to the Constituent Assembly of Pakistan. (Note: He won as an independent; his fellow victors were Avtar Narain Gujral and Bhim Sen Sachar from the Congress.)

A couple of months later, Saran migrated to India and on 1 November 1947, became a member of East Punjab Legislative Assembly. Despite, he did not resign from the Constituent Assembly of Pakistan. In January 1949, the "Committee on Addition and/or Redistribution of Seats", while recommending the dissolution of the two vacant non-Muslim seats in the Assembly, (Note: Both Sachar and Gujral had resigned, before migrating to India. The population of Hindus, as of May 1948, was deemed insufficient by the Committee to secure representation in the Assembly.) hinted that it was constitutionally suspect whether Saran was entitled to retain his seat.

In 1951, Saran supported Bhim Sen Sachar in a factional feud against then-Chief-Minister Gopi Chand Bhargava.
