= Elamaram Kareem =

Indian politician and trade unionist

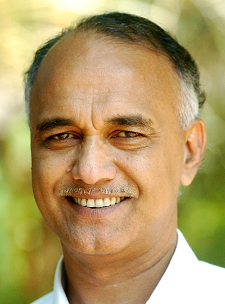

Communist Party of India (Marxist) Leader in Rajya Sabha
- In office April 2020 – July 2024
- Preceded by: C.P. Narayanan
- Constituency: Kerala

Member of Parliament, Rajya Sabha
- In office 2 July 2018 – 1 July 2024
- Preceded by: C.P. Narayanan
- Succeeded by: P.P. Suneer
- Constituency: Kerala

Minister of Industries & Commerce, Government of Kerala
- In office 2006–2011
- Preceded by: V. K. Ebrahimkunju
- Succeeded by: P. K. Kunhalikutty

Personal details
- Born: 1 July 1953 (age 73) Elamaram, Malappuram, Kerala, India
- Party: Communist Party of India (Marxist)
- Spouse: Rahamath Kareem
- Children: Sumi, Nimi

Elamaram Kareem (born 1 July 1953) is an Indian politician, trade unionist, and a member of Communist Party of India (Marxist). He was a Member of Parliament in Rajya Sabha.

He was the Minister for Industries & Commerce in the Left Democratic Front government under V. S. Achuthanandan from 2006 to 2011. He earlier represented the Beypore constituency in Kozhikode district in the Kerala Legislative Assembly.

== Career ==
Kareem was instrumental in organizing the tile industry as well as its revival activities across Kerala.

From 2 June 2018 to 1 July 2024, he was an MP in Rajya Sabha and a standing committee member on labour. He has 89% attendance and 98% participation in debates as opposed to the national average of 78% and 37.4% respectively. Construction of Nanjakode- Nilamboor railway line, Revival of FACT, Kochi, Against the Privatisation of Hindustan Newsprint Limited, Kerala, demand for Kannur seaport-airport-Wayanad- Coorg-Mysuru rail line, Report of Central team on Kerala floods, Reduction in seats for M.Phil. and PhD in Central Universities are some of the major issues he raised in parliament along with various other labour and agricultural issues.

On 21 September 2020, Kareem along with seven other members were suspended from the Rajya Sabha for their unruly behaviour in the house by tearing documents, breaking mics, standing on tables and heckling the Deputy Chairman of the Rajya Sabha. Their actions were condemned by several leaders.

== See also ==
- Kerala Council of Ministers
