= Feroze Gujral =

Indian philanthropist (born 1965)

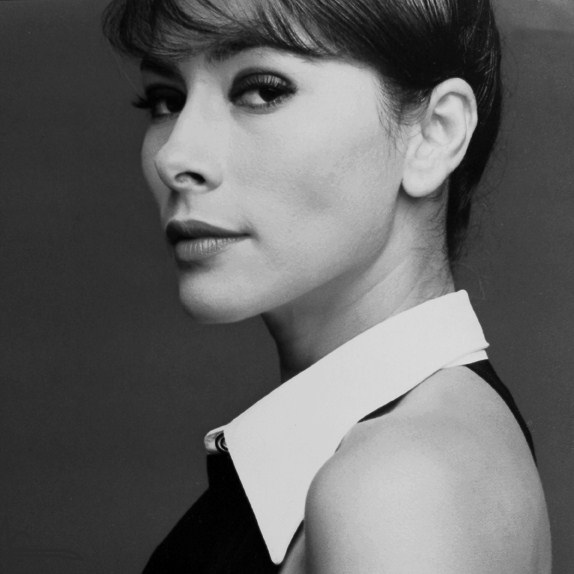
- Gujral in 2010
- Born: Feroze Ewari; 1965 (age 60–61); Hyderabad, India
- Spouse: Mohit Gujral
- Children: Armaan Gujral, Alaiia Gujral
- Relatives: Satish Gujral (father-in-law)
- Website: gujralfoundation.org

Feroze Gujral is an Indian philanthropist, patron of the arts, businesswoman, columnist, media personality and former model.

== Early life and family ==
Feroze was born in Hyderabad, India in 1965. Her mother Viqar is of half-Hyderabadi and half-British descent, while her father George Ewari is of half-Arab and half-Malayali descent.

She did her schooling from The Lawrence School, Sanawar in Himachal Pradesh.

She has two siblings: brother Hanut Ewari, a philatelist, and a sister Anisha.

She is married to Mohit Gujral, the son of Indian artist Satish Gujral (the brother of former prime minister I. K. Gujral) and has two children with him; Armaan Gujral, a businessman and Alaiia Gujral, an artist.

== Career ==
Feroze Gujral was spotted by Vidyun Singh and Asha Kocchar of Media Makers. One of the first ads she did was for Digjam Suitings with Shekhar Kapur. She was a popular model during the 1990s.

=== The Gujral Foundation and Outset India ===
She is the founder and director of The Gujral Foundation, a non-profit trust set up in 2008, along with her husband Mohit Gujral ( the son of the renowned Indian modern artist Satish Gujral ). She is also the founder and director of Outset India, the Indian chapter of the Outset Contemporary Art Fund, which is the largest acquisition art fund in the world, present in 9 countries, established in 2011.

Over the last decade, the Gujral Foundation has supported 150+ artists and 50+ exhibitions in India and internationally. Key projects include My East is Your West - a collateral event at the 56th Venice Biennale, curated by Feroze, produced and presented by the Foundation. The foundation has also commissioned projects for Contour Biennale 8, the 11th Shanghai Biennale, the 8th Berlin Biennale, the London Design Biennale and Kochi-Muziris Biennale. Most recently the first architectural pavilion titled ‘The Song of the Earth and the Sky’ was displayed in the gardens of Sunder Nursery, New Delhi. They have supported numerous projects by other organizations including ‘V. S. Gaitonde at The Solomon R. Guggenheim Museum, ‘Forgotten Masters: Indian Painting for the East India Company’ at The Wallace Collection in the UK, Colomboscope – Sea Change in Sri Lanka etc.

The Foundation has strong educational institutional partnerships with CEPT University and Shiv Nadar University, National Institute of Fashion Technology (NIFT) as well as other cultural institutions including Goethe-Institut, The Foundation for Indian Contemporary Art, Pro-Helvetia, Japan Foundation, Danish Art Foundation and The Institute français en Inde.

=== Patronage and philanthropy ===
Feroze Gujral is regarded as one of India's leading art patrons. She is currently on the Trustee Board of Kochi Muziris Biennale of which she is a Founding Patron. She was previously on the international board of the Guggenheim Museum in New York, the Serpentine Gallery in London, and the advisory board of IGNCA, New Delhi.

Feroze has also been a funding patron for several years of artist grants, awards and prizes including the Gujral Foundation Excellence Award at CEPT University, annual prizes at National Institute of Fashion Technology (NIFT). They also sponsor an art and a soccer prize at Gordonstoun School, UK.

Apart from the arts, the Gujral's have had a long-standing history of patronage and a number of initiatives have been started by the family post-partition including a school, orphanage, home for destitute women and the Pushpa Gujral Science City, all in Jalandhar, Punjab. They are also founder supporters of the forum for street children in Hyderabad, which includes a home for destitute boys that was started in 1989 by Feroze's mother. They also support various other NGOs like Nanhi Chaun (girl child), Save the Children and White Ribbon (safe childbirth). Feroze has for many years also been part of the young parliamentarian's initiative for malnutrition.

=== Business ===
Feroze Gujral, aside from being a model and media personality, is also a businesswoman. Gujral ran a design studio called Fizzaro dealing in fine bone china products and customized table accessories, exporting to multiple countries. She was a founding partner of Broadcast India, the first live broadband streaming platform in India. She was previously the Director of Design Plus, an architecture and design company, founded by her architect and real estate developer husband Mohit Gujral, and is the Founder Director of the international art design consultancy FMG advisors.

=== Ambassador and advisor ===
Feroze was also an ambassador for World Wildlife Fund, with a particular interest in the welfare of the Indian elephant. She is a volunteer for Teach for India and the curator for TEDx Delhi. She has also been brand ambassador and advisor to numerous leading international fashion brands including Burberry, Tod's etc.

=== Media ===
As a contemporary cultural commentator, she has contributed multiple articles to publications including The Indian Express, Financial Chronicle, Deccan Chronicle, Seminar, Vogue, Elle and Condé Nast Traveller amongst others. She was also host of her own TV show ‘Tonight with Feroze’.

== Other Links ==
- At home with art aficionado Feroze Gujral
- The art of giving! Model Feroze Gujral talks about being an 'art patron' now
