= List of Rajya Sabha members from Meghalaya =

The list of current and past Rajya Sabha members from the Meghalaya State. State elect 1 member for the term of 6 years and indirectly elected by the state legislators, since year 1987.

== List of all Rajya Sabha members from Meghalaya state ==
Name	Party	Date of appointment	Date of retirement	Term	Notes
James Sangma ^{[*]}	National People's Party	22/06/2026	21/06/2032	1	Current Member
Wanweiroy Kharlukhi	National People's Party	22/06/2020	21/06/2026	1	
Wansuk Syiem	Indian National Congress	12/04/2013	12/04/2014	1	Res of TA Sangma
Wansuk Syiem	Indian National Congress	13/04/2014	12/04/2020	2	
Robert Kharshiing	Nationalist Congress Party	13/04/2002	12/04/2008	1	
Thomas A. Sangma	Nationalist Congress Party	13/04/2008	12/04/2014	1	Res. 04/02/2013
Onward L. Nongtdu	Indian National Congress	13/04/1996	12/04/2002	1	
George Gilbert Swell	Hill State People's Democratic Party	13/04/1990	12/04/1996	1	
Jerlie E. Tariang	Indian National Congress	13/04/1984	12/04/1990	1	
Alexander Warjri	Independent	13/04/1978	12/04/1984	1	
Showaless K. Shilla	Indian National Congress	13/04/1972	12/04/1978	1	
