= Matters of Discretion =

Book by I. K. Gujral

Matters of Discretion: An Autobiography
- Author: Inder Kumar Gujral
- Language: English
- Subject: The Life of Inder Kumar Gujral.
- Genre: autobiographical, non fiction
- Publisher: Penguin Books/Hay House
- Publication date: 2011
- Publication place: India
- English publication date: 2011
- Media type: book
- Pages: 519
- ISBN: 978-938048080-0

Matters of Discretion: An Autobiography is an autobiography by a former prime minister of India Inder Kumar Gujral and the only one to be written by a former Indian prime minister thus far.

== Synopsis ==
It deals with Gujral's life starting with partition and his moving to India and provides an exposition of his public life.

== Structure ==
The book is divided into four parts, namely:

- Entry into the Whirlpool of Politics
- From Politics to Diplomacy
- Back into the Whirlpool of Politics
- My Tenure as Prime Minister

== Pictures ==
The book has several pictures of Gujral with various dignitaries.
