= Dadenggre Assembly constituency =

Legislative Assembly constituency in Meghalaya State, India

Coordinates: 25.72°N 90.19°E

Dadenggre
- Constituency No. 49 for the Meghalaya Legislative Assembly

Constituency details
- Country: India
- Region: Northeast India
- State: Meghalaya
- District: West Garo Hills
- Lok Sabha constituency: Tura
- Established: 1972
- Total electors: 36,136
- Reservation: ST

Member of Legislative Assembly
- 11th Meghalaya Legislative Assembly
- Incumbent Rupa M. Marak
- Party: All India Trinamool Congress
- Elected year: 2023

Dadenggre is a town in the West Garo Hills district and one of the 60 Legislative Assembly constituencies of Meghalaya state in India. It is part of West Garo Hills district and is reserved for candidates belonging to the Scheduled Tribes. It falls under Tura Lok Sabha constituency. Current MLA from this constituency is James Sangma of National People's Party.

== Member of Legislative Assembly ==
Year	Member	Party
1972	Reidson Momin	All Party Hill Leaders Conference
1978	Bronson W. Momin	All Party Hill Leaders Conference
1983	Norwin Sangma	Indian National Congress
1988	Norwin B. Sangma	Indian National Congress
1993	Augustine D.Marak	Independent politician
1998	Augustine D.Marak	Independent politician
2003	Edmund K Sangma	Nationalist Congress Party
2008	Augustine D.Marak	Indian National Congress
2013	James Pangsang Kongkal Sangma	National People's Party
2018	James Pangsang Kongkal Sangma	National People's Party
2023	Rupa M. Marak	All India Trinamool Congress

== Election results ==
=== Assembly Election 2023 ===
2023 Meghalaya Legislative Assembly election: Dadenggre
Party	Candidate	Votes	%	±%
AITC	Rupa M. Marak	15,702	48.18%	▲42.73
NPP	James Pangsang Kongkal Sangma	15,684	48.12%	▲22.03
BJP	Braining R. Marak	481	1.48%	New
INC	Chesterfield Sangma	367	1.13%	▼13.12
RPI(A)	Witjeng N. Sangma	359	1.10%	New
NOTA	None of the Above	326	1.00%	▼0.68
Margin of victory		18	0.06%	▼9.98
Turnout		32,593	90.20%	▼1.79
Registered electors		36,136		▲19.81
AITC gain from NPP		Swing	▲22.09	

=== Assembly Election 2018 ===
2018 Meghalaya Legislative Assembly election: Dadenggre
Party	Candidate	Votes	%	±%
NPP	James Pangsang Kongkal Sangma	7,239	26.09%	▼3.83
Independent	Rupa M. Marak	4,454	16.05%	New
Independent	June Eliana R. Marak	4,242	15.29%	New
INC	Ismail R. Marak	3,953	14.25%	▼8.80
Independent	Levastone T. Sangma	3,576	12.89%	New
AITC	Bredar Bolwari Marak	1,510	5.44%	New
Independent	Labenn Ch. Marak	1,436	5.18%	New
NOTA	None of the Above	465	1.68%	New
Margin of victory		2,785	10.04%	▲6.33
Turnout		27,746	91.99%	▲0.69
Registered electors		30,162		▲22.52
NPP hold		Swing	▼3.83	

=== Assembly Election 2013 ===
2013 Meghalaya Legislative Assembly election: Dadenggre
Party	Candidate	Votes	%	±%
NPP	James Pangsang Kongkal Sangma	6,725	29.92%	New
Independent	Ismail R. Marak	5,892	26.21%	New
INC	Purno K. Sangma	5,180	23.05%	▼16.27
Independent	Sengman R. Marak	3,023	13.45%	New
Independent	Somip R. Marak	1,367	6.08%	New
NCP	Rohidas Marak	290	1.29%	▼32.29
Margin of victory		833	3.71%	▼2.03
Turnout		22,477	91.30%	▼0.61
Registered electors		24,618		▲5.90
NPP gain from INC		Swing	▼9.40	

=== Assembly Election 2008 ===
2008 Meghalaya Legislative Assembly election: Dadenggre
Party	Candidate	Votes	%	±%
INC	Augustine D.Marak	8,401	39.32%	▼2.19
NCP	Edmund K.Sangma	7,176	33.58%	▼9.68
Independent	Pejush R. Marak	1,878	8.79%	New
Independent	David Ch.Marak	1,610	7.53%	New
Independent	Josasburdin A.Sangma	745	3.49%	New
Independent	Hapine M.Marak	676	3.16%	New
Independent	Sengban R. Sangma	444	2.08%	New
Margin of victory		1,225	5.73%	▲3.97
Turnout		21,367	91.91%	▲14.08
Registered electors		23,247		▼1.51
INC gain from NCP		Swing	▼3.95	

=== Assembly Election 2003 ===
2003 Meghalaya Legislative Assembly election: Dadenggre
Party	Candidate	Votes	%	±%
NCP	Edmund K Sangma	7,948	43.26%	New
INC	Augustine D.Marak	7,625	41.51%	▼1.04
Independent	Sengban R. Sangma	1,290	7.02%	New
BJP	Hemrith Marak	913	4.97%	New
UDP	Jova Marak	345	1.88%	New
CPI	Witherson Marak	250	1.36%	New
Margin of victory		323	1.76%	▼4.73
Turnout		18,371	77.83%	▲3.50
Registered electors		23,603		▲9.29
NCP gain from Independent		Swing	▼5.77	

=== Assembly Election 1998 ===
1998 Meghalaya Legislative Assembly election: Dadenggre
Party	Candidate	Votes	%	±%
Independent	Augustine D.Marak	7,871	49.03%	New
INC	Edmund K. Sangma	6,830	42.55%	▲13.04
GNC	Norwin Sangma	1,351	8.42%	New
Margin of victory		1,041	6.49%	▲6.18
Turnout		16,052	77.41%	▼2.92
Registered electors		21,596		▲13.05
Independent hold		Swing		

=== Assembly Election 1993 ===
1993 Meghalaya Legislative Assembly election: Dadenggre
Party	Candidate	Votes	%	±%
Independent	Augustine D.Marak	4,399	29.81%	New
INC	Norwin B. Sangma	4,354	29.51%	▼5.23
HPU	Ranald Momin	3,158	21.40%	▲0.56
Independent	Denison Sangma	2,845	19.28%	New
Margin of victory		45	0.30%	▼13.60
Turnout		14,756	79.55%	▲12.52
Registered electors		19,103		▲19.78
Independent gain from INC		Swing	▼4.93	

=== Assembly Election 1988 ===
1988 Meghalaya Legislative Assembly election: Dadenggre
Party	Candidate	Votes	%	±%
INC	Norwin B. Sangma	3,586	34.74%	▼9.08
HPU	Denison Sangma	2,151	20.84%	New
Independent	Ronald Momin	1,908	18.48%	New
Independent	Levison Sangma	1,610	15.60%	New
Margin of victory		1,435	13.90%	▼0.38
Turnout		10,323	67.82%	▲2.97
Registered electors		15,949		▲25.74
INC hold		Swing	▼9.08	

=== Assembly Election 1983 ===
1983 Meghalaya Legislative Assembly election: Dadenggre
Party	Candidate	Votes	%	±%
INC	Norwin Sangma	3,432	43.81%	▲5.63
HSPDP	Denison M. Sangma	2,313	29.53%	New
APHLC	Bronson W. Momin	2,088	26.66%	▼35.16
Margin of victory		1,119	14.29%	▼9.35
Turnout		7,833	65.54%	▲17.26
Registered electors		12,684		▲22.37
INC gain from APHLC		Swing		

=== Assembly Election 1978 ===
1978 Meghalaya Legislative Assembly election: Dadenggre
Party	Candidate	Votes	%	±%
APHLC	Bronson W. Momin	2,851	61.82%	▼3.77
INC	Norwin Sangma	1,761	38.18%	New
Margin of victory		1,090	23.63%	▼7.53
Turnout		4,612	47.85%	▲20.79
Registered electors		10,365		▲73.65
APHLC hold		Swing	▼3.77	

=== Assembly Election 1972 ===
1972 Meghalaya Legislative Assembly election: Dadenggre
Party	Candidate	Votes	%	±%
APHLC	Reidson Momin	928	65.58%	New
Independent	Bronson W. Momin	487	34.42%	New
Margin of victory		441	31.17%	
Turnout		1,415	26.55%	
Registered electors		5,969		
APHLC win (new seat)				

== See also ==
- List of constituencies of the Meghalaya Legislative Assembly
- Tura (Lok Sabha constituency)
- West Garo Hills district
