= Wanweiroy Kharlukhi =

Indian politician

Member of Parliament, Rajya Sabha
- In office 22 June 2020 – 21 June 2026
- Preceded by: Wansuk Syiem
- Succeeded by: James Sangma
- Constituency: Meghalaya

Personal details
- Party: National People's Party

Wanweiroy Kharlukhi is an Indian politician. He is a Member of Parliament, representing Meghalaya in the Rajya Sabha the upper house of India's Parliament as a member of the National People's Party.
