= Agatha Sangma =

Indian politician (born 1980)

Agatha K. Sangma
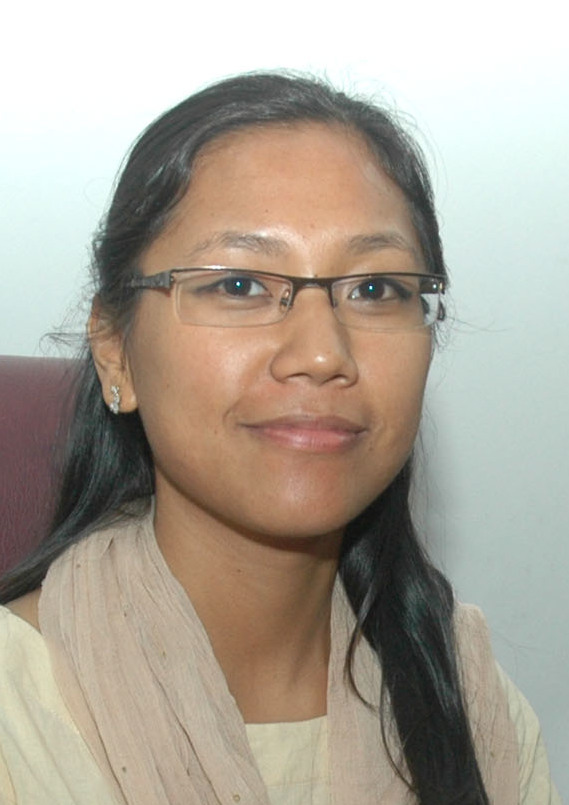
- Sangma in 2009

Member of Parliament, Lok Sabha
- In office 17 June 2019 – 4 June 2024
- Prime Minister: Narendra Modi
- Preceded by: Conrad Sangma
- Succeeded by: Saleng A. Sangma
- Constituency: Tura
- In office 25 May 2008 – 16 May 2014
- Preceded by: P. A. Sangma
- Succeeded by: P. A. Sangma
- Constituency: Tura

Minister of State for Rural Development
- In office 23 May 2009 – 28 October 2012
- Succeeded by: Suryakanta Patil

Personal details
- Born: Agatha Kongkal Sangma; 24 July 1980 (age 46) New Delhi, India
- Party: National People's Party
- Other political affiliations: Nationalist Congress Party
- Spouse: Patrick Rongma Marak (m. 2019)
- Parent: P. A. Sangma (father)
- Relatives: James Sangma (brother); Conrad Sangma (brother)
- Education: Savitribai Phule Pune University; University of Nottingham
- Profession: Lawyer; Politician

Agatha Kongkal Sangma (born 24 July 1980) is an Indian politician and a former Member of Parliament, Lok Sabha representing the Tura constituency of Meghalaya. At the age of 29, she is the youngest member of parliament ever in India to be appointed Union Minister in Government of India to date. Sangma is the second woman from Northeast India to be appointed as union minister in the Government of India after Renuka Devi Barkataki from Assam. She is a member of the National People's Party.

== Early and education ==
Agatha Sangma was born in New Delhi to P. A. Sangma, the former speaker of the Lok Sabha, and Soradini K. Sangma. She was brought up in West Garo Hills, Meghalaya. Sangma received her LLB degree from Pune University and later joined the bar in Delhi High Court. She earned her master's degree in environmental management at the University of Nottingham, UK.

== Career ==
Sangma was first elected to the 14th Lok Sabha in a by-election in May 2008, after her father P.A. Sangma resigned from the seat to enter state politics. Later she was re elected to 15th Lok Sabha. At age 29, Sangma was the youngest Member of Parliament ever to be appointed Union Minister in Government of India to date.

Sangma was Minister of State for Rural development. She resigned from this post during the cabinet reshuffle in October 2012.

It was reported in November 2017 that she would contest the 2018 Meghalaya legislative assembly election on a National People's Party (NPP) ticket. She contested from the South Tura constituency and polled 6,499 votes, winning the seat. But she submitted her resignation as member of the House in an attempt to pave way for her brother to contest the by-election from her constituency.

== Personal life ==
Her brother Conrad Sangma is the current Chief Minister of Meghalaya. Agatha married Patrick Rongma Marak, a physician, on 21 November 2019.

== See also ==
- Second Manmohan Singh ministry
