= Sheila Gujral =

Indian poet and writer (1924–2011)

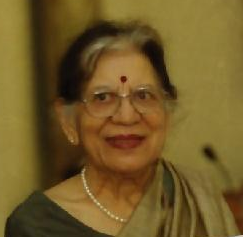

Spouse of the Prime Minister of India
- In role 21 April 1997 – 19 March 1998
- Prime Minister: Inder Kumar Gujral
- Preceded by: Chennamma Deve Gowda
- Succeeded by: Gursharan Kaur

Personal details
- Born: 24 December 1924 Lahore, British India
- Died: 11 July 2011 (aged 86) Delhi, India
- Spouse: Inder Kumar Gujral (m. 1945)
- Children: 2, including Naresh Gujral
- Relatives: Avtar Narain Gujral (father-in-law); Satish Gujral (brother-in-law)

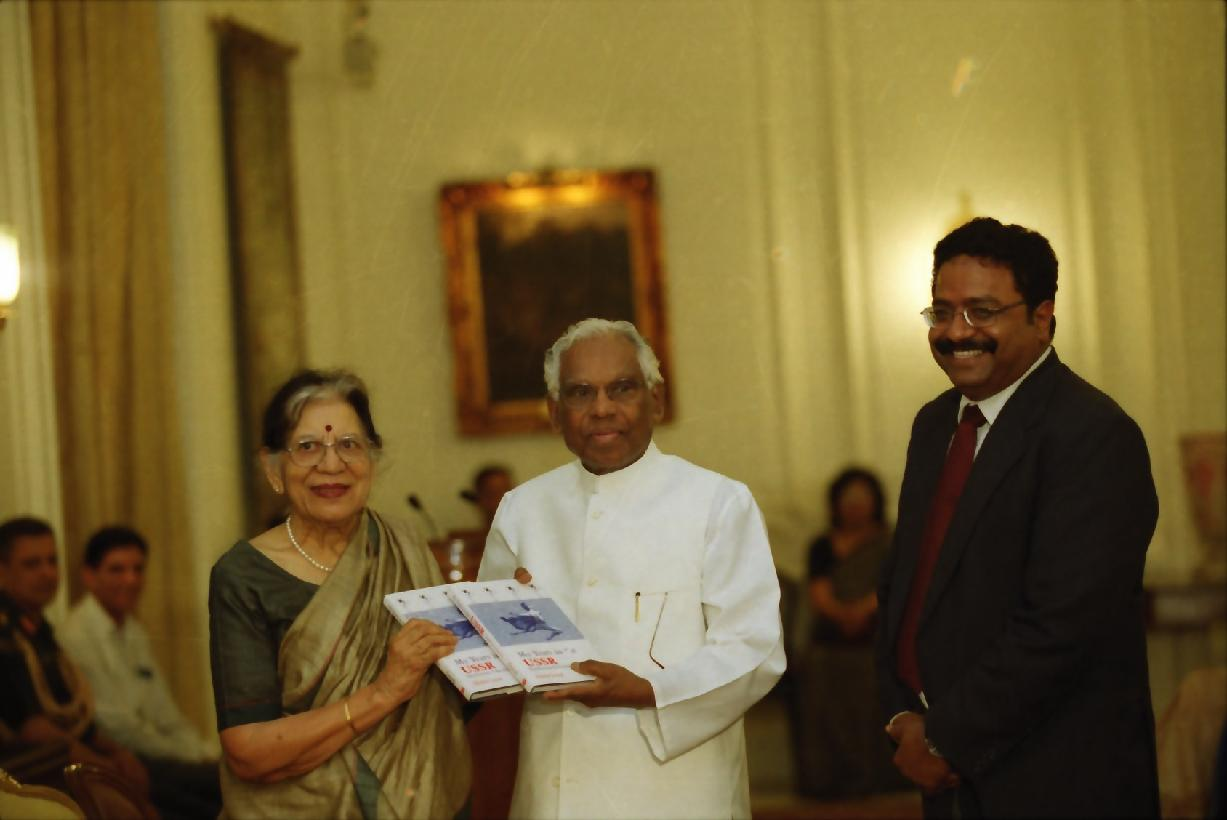
The President of India, K R Narayanan receiving a Copy of the Book "My Years in USSR" from Sheila Gujral

Sheila Gujral (24 December 1924 – 11 July 2011) was an Indian poet and writer in Hindi, Punjabi and English. She was also a social worker and the wife of Inder Kumar Gujral, the 12th Prime Minister of India.

== Early life ==
Sheila Gujral was born on 24 January 1924 in Lahore and was married to Inder Kumar Gujral, the son of politician Avtar Narain Gujral, on 26 May 1945. They had two sons, Naresh Gujral (born 19 May 1948), who is a former Rajya Sabha MP, and Vishal Gujral.

Her brother-in-law, Satish Gujral, was a noted Indian artist.

On 11 July 2011, she died at her home in Delhi after a brief illness.

== Awards ==
She is recipient of International Poets Academy's Life Time Achievement Award and Golden Poet Award.
