= Raseel Gujral Ansal =

Indian Interior designer

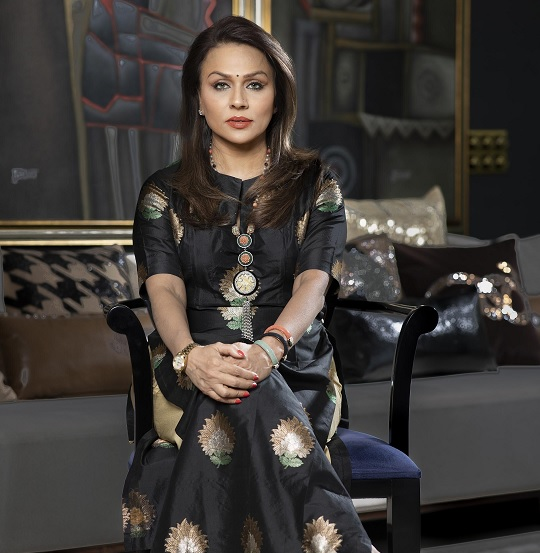
- Occupations: Designer, Spatial Design
- Spouse: Navin Ansal (m.1998)
- Parents: Satish Gujral (father); Kiran Gujral (mother)
- Relatives: Inder Kumar Gujral (Uncle)

Raseel Gujral Ansal (born January 6, 1965) is an Indian Interior designer renowned for her expertise in Spatial Designer, interiors, and product design.

== Early life ==
Raseel Gujral Ansal was born on January 6, 1965, in Delhi, India, into a family renowned for its contributions to art and politics. Her father, Satish Gujral (Padma Vibhushan), was a celebrated painter, sculptor, and muralist, while her mother, Kiran Gujral, was recognized for her work in ceramics. Additionally, she is the niece of Inder Kumar Gujral, a former Prime Minister of India.

From a young age, Raseel was deeply immersed in the world of art. She actively participated in her parents' art exhibitions, absorbing their work ethic and artistic influences. She received her early education at Modern School in Delhi, and later at Welham Girls' School in Dehradun, where she continued to nurture her passion for the arts. At the age of 20, Raseel joined the architectural practice run by her father and brother as an interior architect.

== Career ==
Raseel Gujral Ansal began her career in interior Spatial Design, but her creative spirit soon led her to explore furniture and product design. In the early 1990s, she established her own Spatial Design and design studio, "Raseel Gujral Ansal Design" (RGA Design). Building on this success, she ventured into the retail sector.

In 1994, Raseel co-founded Casa Paradox with her husband, Navin Ansal. Casa Paradox is renowned for its innovative and luxurious designs that transform living spaces.

In 2013, Raseel launched Casa Pop, a prêt diffusion line of Casa Paradox, which broadened the scope of her design work to include product categories such as clothing and fashion accessories.

Through these ventures, Raseel has introduced multiple stores and collaborated on shop-in-shop arrangements, offering a wide range of products including furniture, furnishings, décor, fashion, and fashion accessories.

== Awards ==
Raseel's work has been prominently featured in major publications, and she has been honored with numerous awards for her significant contributions to the design industry.

- 2011 Elle Deco International Design Awards
- India's Best Dressed List 2012
- 2014 Architectural Digest Award for Most Influential Names in Indian Architecture and Design
- Luxury Lifestyle Awards 2015
- Woman Architects & Designers Federation (Wade Awards 2016)
- 2017: Elite Magazine - Influential Entrepreneurs
- 2018: Hello! Magazine - Timeless Icon
- Asia Pacific Property Award 2019-2020

== Personal life ==
Raseel is married to Navin Ansal since 1998. They have three children.
