= James Sangma =

Indian politician (born 1975)

Member of Parliament, Rajya Sabha
- Incumbent
- Assumed office 12 June 2026
- Preceded by: Wanweiroy Kharlukhi
- Constituency: Meghalaya

National Working President National People's Party (India)
- Incumbent
- Assumed office 24 March 2025
- President: Conrad Sangma
- Preceded by: Office established

Chairman, Meghalaya Industrial Development Corporation
- Incumbent
- Assumed office 5 April 2023
- Constituency: Dadenggre
- In office 2008–2023
- Preceded by: Sengman R Marak
- Succeeded by: Rupa M Marak

Personal details
- Born: November 21, 1975 (age 50) Tura, West Garo Hills, Meghalaya, India
- Party: National People's Party (2013–present)
- Other political affiliations: Nationalist Congress Party (until 2013)
- Spouse: Jasmine B. Sangma
- Children: 3
- Parent: P. A. Sangma (father)
- Relatives: Conrad Sangma (brother); Agatha Sangma (sister)
- Education: B.A. – Ramjas College, University of Delhi
- Occupation: Politician · Public Service

James Pangsang Kongkal Sangma (born 21 November 1975) is an Indian politician from Meghalaya. A senior figure in the National People's Party (NPP), he has served as the party’s first National Working President since March 2025 and as Chairman of the Meghalaya Industrial Development Corporation (MIDC) from April 2023.

He was a three-term member of the Meghalaya Legislative Assembly (2008–2023) representing Dadenggre and held key cabinet portfolios—including Home, Power, Law, Food & Civil Supplies, and Forest & Environment—in the Conrad Sangma ministry between 2018 and 2021.

He has been elected for Rajya Sabha in June 2026.

== Early life and education ==
Sangma was born in Tura to the political family of former Lok Sabha Speaker P. A. Sangma. After schooling at Don Bosco institutions, he earned a Bachelor of Arts degree from Ramjas College, University of Delhi. Like his siblings—Conrad and Agatha—he entered politics early, campaigning for his father in parliamentary elections.

== Political career ==
=== Entry and rise (2008–2017) ===
- 2008 – first elected to the Meghalaya Legislative Assembly from Rongchugiri as an NCP candidate.
- 2013 – re-elected, now on the NPP ticket after the party’s formation by P. A. Sangma.

=== Cabinet minister (2018–2021) ===
Following the 2018 election, Sangma entered the Conrad-led Meghalaya Democratic Alliance (MDA) government. Over the next three years he simultaneously headed Home (Police), District Council Affairs, Power, Law, Food & Civil Supplies, Forest & Environment and Health.

=== Controversies and reshuffles ===
In 2020–21 coalition partners and the opposition demanded his removal over alleged irregularities in the state-owned Meghalaya Energy Corporation Limited (MeECL). Amid pressure, the Home portfolio was re-allocated in February 2020 and Power in September 2021.

=== Electoral setback (2023) ===
In the 2023 assembly election he lost Dadenggre to Trinamool Congress candidate Rupa M. Marak by seven votes, ending a 15-year stint as MLA.

=== National Working President of NPP (2025–present) ===
Despite the defeat, the NPP elevated Sangma to National Working President in March 2025 during its organisational overhaul for 2025–28, tasking him with pan-India expansion of the party.

== Policy initiatives ==
=== Environment State vision ===
As Forest & Environment minister, Sangma articulated a concept of turning Meghalaya into an “Environment State”, promoting nature-based industries, carbon farming and biodiversity mapping.

=== Mental Health and Social Care Policy (2022) ===
He spearheaded the Meghalaya Mental Health and Social Care Policy, approved on 29 November 2022, making the state the first in North-East India with a dedicated mental-health framework.

=== Industrial turnaround at MIDC ===
Under his chairmanship, MIDC achieved ISO 9001:2015 and ISO 14001:2015 certification and secured a ₹200 crore investment from Varun Beverages for a PepsiCo bottling plant.

== Controversies ==
- MeECL procurement and Saubhagya implementation – Allegations of favouritism and cost overruns led to a judicial inquiry; Sangma welcomed the probe, which later found no major procurement violations.
- Illegal coal transportation – Opposition parties accused him of inaction against clandestine mining networks; no charges have been proven.

== Electoral record ==
Year	Constituency	Party	Result	Margin
2008	Rongchugiri	NCP	Won	2 ,361
2013	Dadenggre	NPP	Won	3 ,724
2018	Dadenggre	NPP	Won	4 ,995
2023	Dadenggre	NPP	Lost	18

== Awards and recognition ==
- COSIDICI National Award for Outstanding Performance (2024) – accepted on behalf of MIDC.
- Dual ISO certification (2024) for MIDC quality and environmental management systems.

== See also ==
- Conrad Sangma
- Agatha Sangma
- P. A. Sangma
