= Avtar Narain Gujral =

Indian politician

Lala Avtar Narain Gujral (also, Lala Avatar Narayan Gujral; died 1976) was an Indian politician from Punjab and the father of I. K. Gujral, the 12th prime minister of India (hence also the father-in-law of noted Hindi poet Sheila Gujral), and artist Satish Gujral. He represented the non-Muslim population of West Punjab in the Constituent Assembly of Pakistan for a few months.

His grandson Naresh Gujral is also a politician in India.

== Personal life ==
Gujral was born in Pari Darwaza, a hamlet about twenty five miles away from Jhelum; he lost his father Duni Chand at an age of sixteen to bubonic plague. Gujral was an alumnus of D.A.V. Lahore, and finished his higher secondary schooling from Jammu; he was a lawyer, by profession. He was married to Pushpa.

Gujral's son described him as a Hindu reformist who drew inspiration from the Arya Samaj movement and especially, Lala Lajpat Rai.

== Political career ==
=== British India ===
Gujral served as the district-president for the Jhelum unit of the Indian National Congress. He was jailed multiple times by the British Government for engaging in subversive activities.

=== Pakistan ===
As the 1946 Cabinet Mission to India decided on partitioning India, Gujral chose to stay in Pakistan; he was ensured of a harmonious environment by Ghazanfar Ali Khan, a lawyer from Jhelum and a leading politician of the Punjab Muslim League. On 4 July 1947, Gujral was elected by the non-Muslim members of the (yet-undivided) Punjab Assembly to the Constituent Assembly of Pakistan; (Note: He was nominated by the Congress; his fellow victors were Bhim Sen Sachar (Congress) and Ganga Saran (Ind.)) he attended the inaugural session on 10 August.

Three days later, the non-Muslim members of the Constituent Assembly met in Gujral's home at Karachi, and formed the "Pakistan Congress"; he was elected as the Chief Whip. Soon, Liaquat Ali Khan, the first prime minister of Pakistan, sent him to Delhi to ensure the safety of Muslims who wished to migrate to Pakistan; while in Delhi, Gujral arranged for the migration of his extended family and esp. the women. He stayed with his son in Karachi for a while, before following suit. (Note: I. K. Gujral claims that they had no plans of leaving Pakistan until the 1948 Karachi riots motivated their decision; his younger brother Satish Gujral claims likewise and cites a tribal invasion of Jhelum district for triggering their migration. In October 1947, the local branch of the Hindu Mahasabha attacked Gujral for commending the protection afforded to the minority community in Jhelum; it was sarcatically noted that Gujral himself had "removed all [of his] relatives and capital to the Indian Union".) A year later, in January 1949, the "Committee on Addition and/or Redistribution of Seats" recommended the dissolution of his seat in the Constituent Assembly. (Note: The post-migration population of Hindus in the province, as of May 1948, was deemed insufficient by the Committee to secure any representation.)

=== India ===
Gujral settled in Jalandhar; at Nehru's behest, he was appointed as a Judge in the Punjab Industrial Tribunal. He died on 30 May 1976 of cardiac arrest.
