= Satish Gujral =

Indian painter and sculptor (1925–2020)

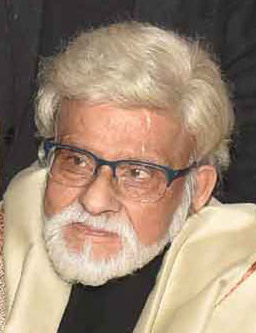
- Gujral in December 2017
- Born: Satish Gujral; 25 December 1925; Jhelum, Punjab, British India
- Died: 26 March 2020 (aged 94); New Delhi, India
- Education: Mayo School of Arts, Lahore Sir J. J. School of Art, Bombay Apprentice under Diego Rivera and David Alfaro Siqueiros, Mexico
- Known for: Indian art, sculpture, mural and literature
- Style: Mural, Abstract, Architecture
- Movement: Modern, Mural
- Spouse: Kiran Gujral
- Children: Alpana Gujral, Mohit Gujral, Raseel Gujral Ansal
- Father: Avtar Narain Gujral
- Relatives: Inder Kumar Gujral (brother); Naresh Gujral (nephew); Sheila Gujral (sister-in-law); Feroze Gujral (daughter-in-law)
- Awards: Padma Vibhushan (1999), Order of the Crown by Belgium Government

Satish Gujral (25 December 1925 – 26 March 2020) was an Indian painter, sculptor, muralist, writer and architect of the post-independent era. He was awarded the Padma Vibhushan, the second-highest civilian award of the Republic of India, in 1999. His elder brother, Inder Kumar Gujral, was the Prime Minister of India between 1997 and 1998.

== Early life ==
Gujral was born in Jhelum in the Punjab Province of British India (now in Punjab, Pakistan) into a Punjabi Hindu Khatri family. He was the son of Indian politician Avtar Narain Gujral and the brother of I. K. Gujral, the 12th Prime Minister of India; his sister in law, Sheila Gujral, was a noted Hindi poet. His nephew Naresh Gujral is also a politician.

Gujral’s life shaped by a childhood accident which led to permanent hearing impairment.

== Education ==
Because of his hearing inability, many schools refused admission to Gujral. One day he saw a bird sitting on a tree branch and drew a picture of it. It was an early indication of his interest in painting and later in 1939, he joined the Mayo School of Arts in Lahore, to study applied arts. He moved to Bombay in 1944 and enrolled in the Sir JJ School of Art. In 1947, due to a recurring sickness, he was forced to drop out of school and leave Bombay.

In 1952, Gujral received a scholarship to study at the Palacio de Bellas Artes in Mexico City, where he was apprenticed to the renowned artists Diego Rivera and David Alfaro Siqueiros.

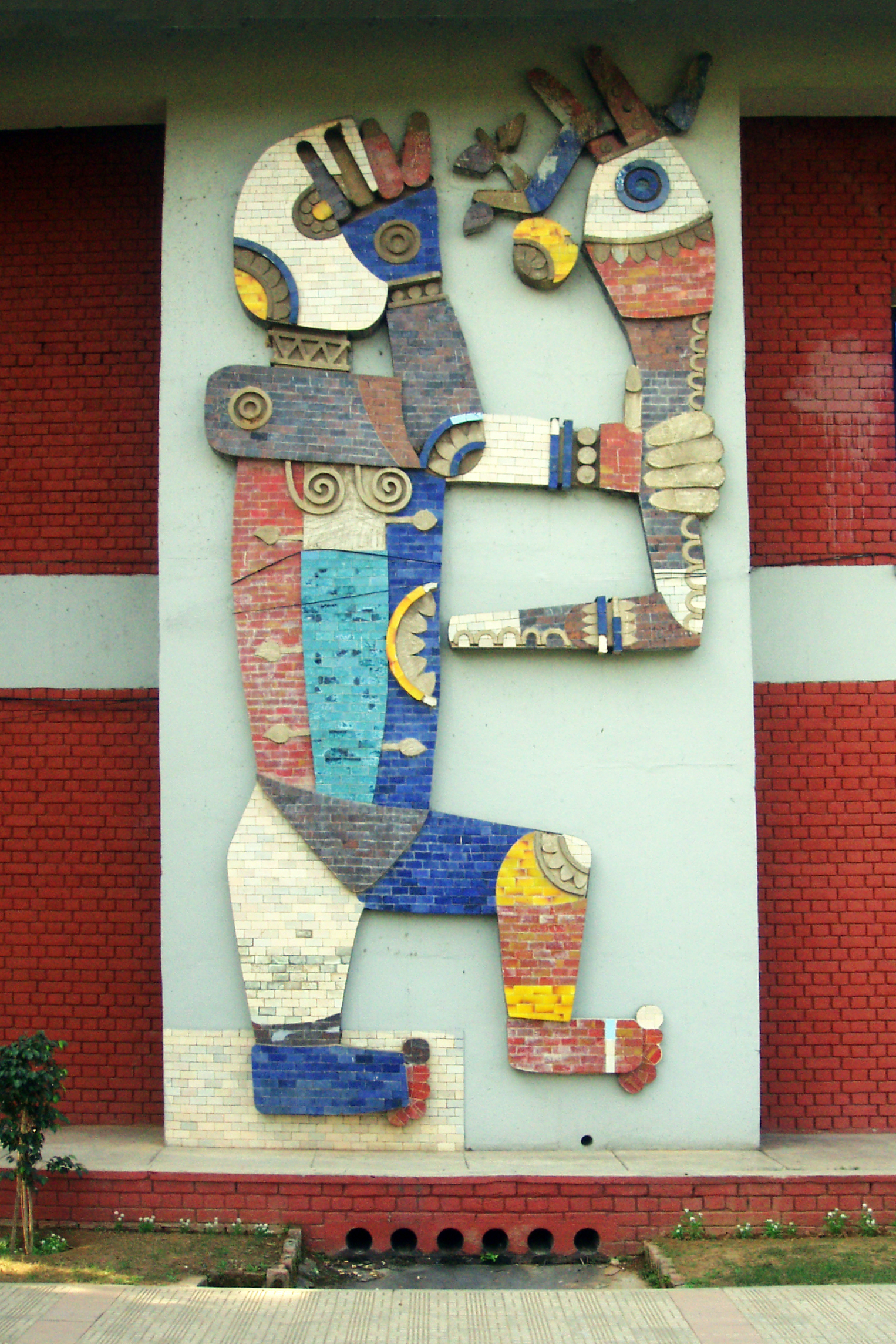
A mural by Satish Gujral at Punjab Agricultural University campus in Ludhiana, Punjab

== Works ==
The Partition of India and the associated agony of the immigrants impacted a young Satish and manifested itself in the artworks he created. From 1952 to 1974, Gujral organised shows of his sculptures, paintings and graphics in many cities across the world such as New York City, New Delhi, Montreal, Berlin and Tokyo, among others.

Gujral was also an architect and his design of the Belgium Embassy in New Delhi was selected by the international forum of architects as one of the finest buildings built in the 20th century.

== Personal life ==
Gujral lived with his wife Kiran (1937–2024) in New Delhi. Their son Mohit Gujral, who is an architect, is married to former model, Feroze Gujral. They also have 2 daughters, Alpana, a jewellery designer, and Raseel Gujral Ansal, an interior designer and owner of Casa Paradox & Casa Pop and is married to Navin Ansal.

== Death ==
Gujral died on 26 March 2020 in New Delhi, aged 94. His body was later cremated in the presence of his close family.

== In popular culture ==
Dozens of documentaries have been made recording Gujral's work. The Films Division of India produced a short documentary film on his life, titled Satish Gujral, directed by Balwant Gargi it provides an overview of his life and works.

He was also part of the 2007 BBC television film, Partition: The Day India Burned. A 24-minute documentary called "A Brush with Life" was released on 15 February 2012 which was based on his own book with the same name. Four books of his work have been published, including an autobiography.

== Global policy ==
Along with his brother Inder Kumar Gujral, he was one of the signatories of the agreement to convene a convention for drafting a world constitution. As a result, for the first time in human history, a World Constituent Assembly convened to draft and adopt the Constitution for the Federation of Earth.

== Awards and legacy ==
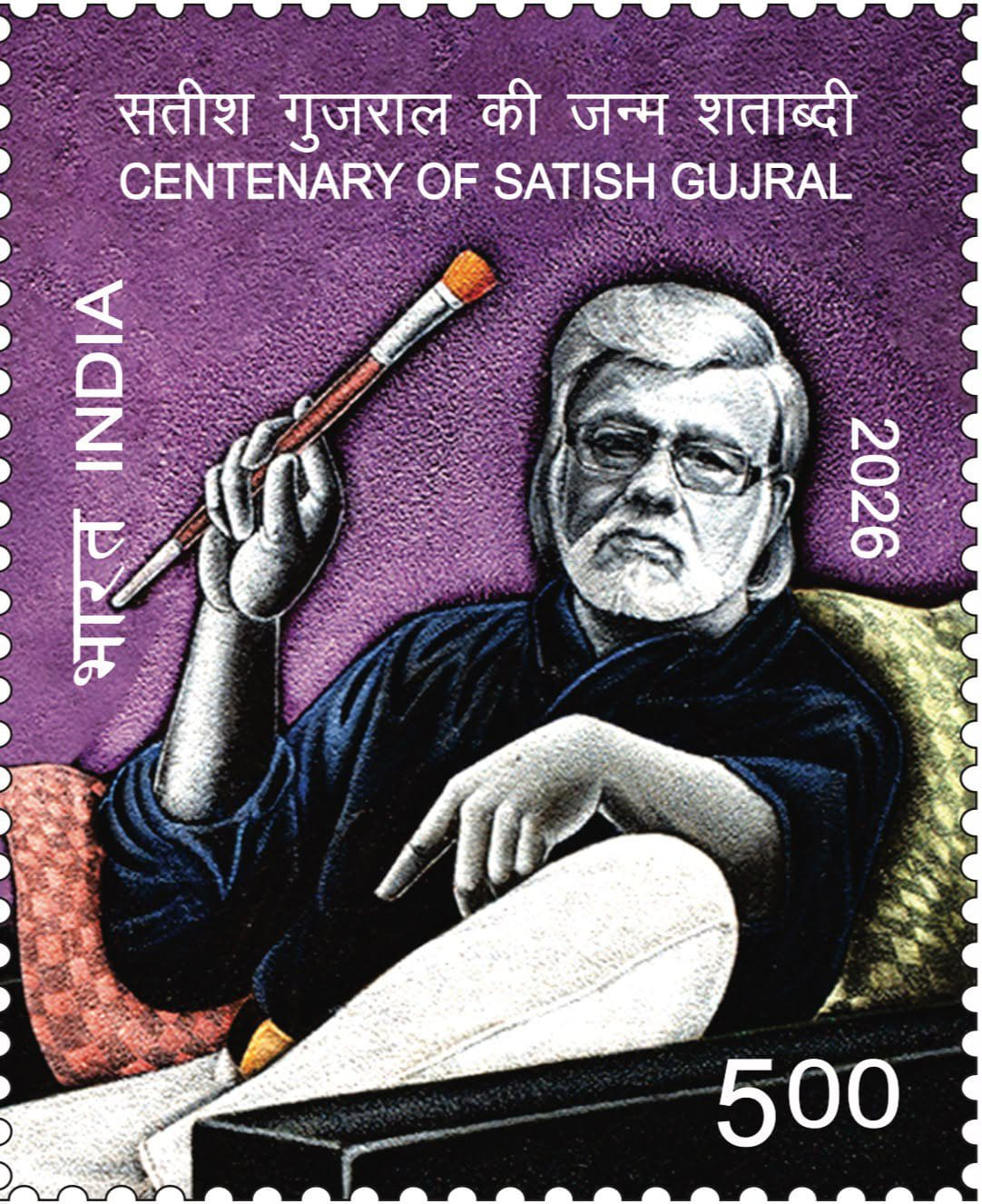
Gujral on a 2026 stamp of India

Gujral was awarded India's second-highest civilian honour Padma Vibhushan in 1999. In April 2014, he was honoured with NDTV Indian of the Year Award.

On 3rd August 2026, India Post released postage stamps to commemorate his birth Centenary.

== See also ==
- Manjit Bawa
- Sobha Singh
