= Inder Kumar Gujral =

Prime Minister of India from 1997 to 1998

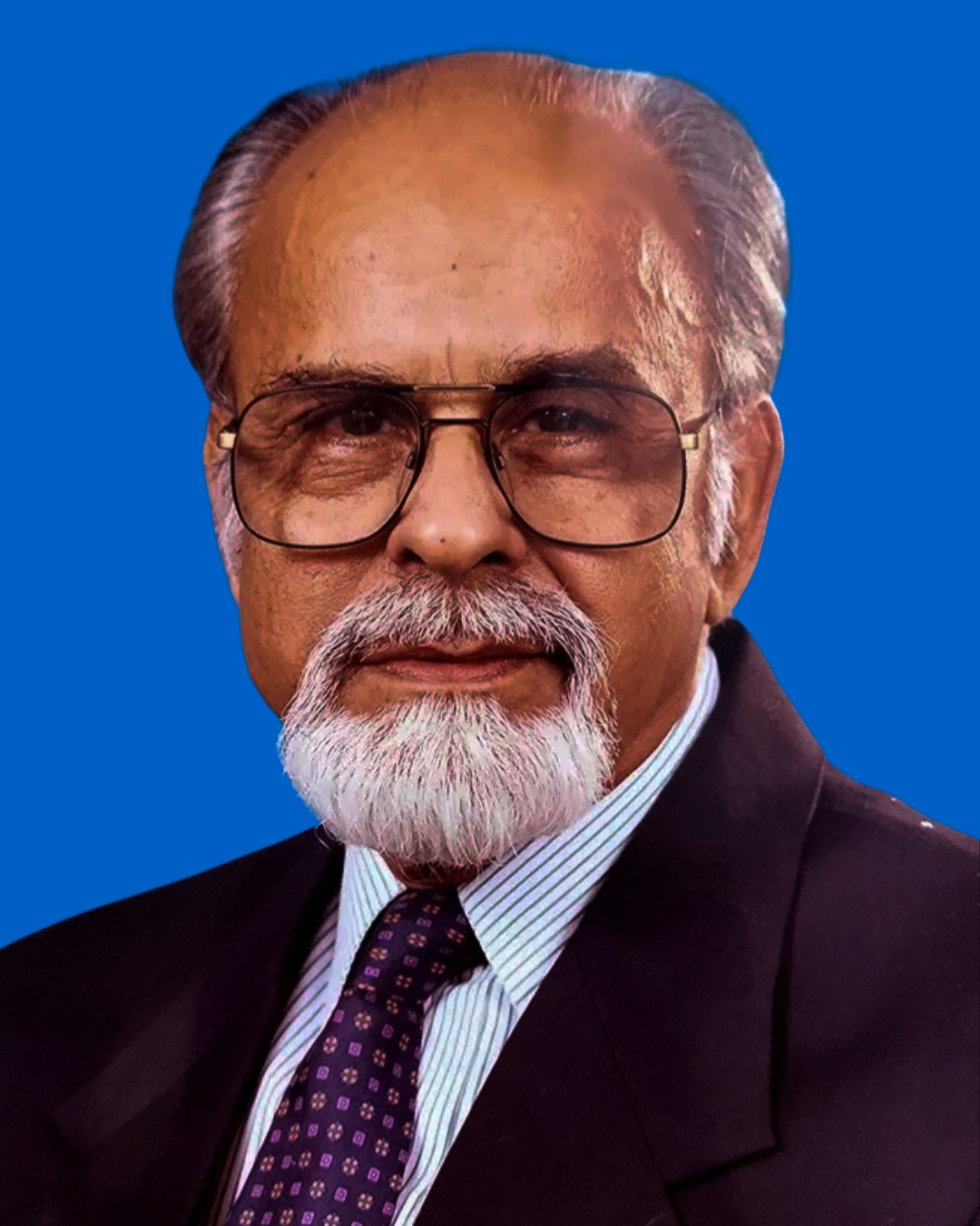
- Official portrait, c. 1997

Prime Minister of India
- In office 21 April 1997 – 19 March 1998
- President: Shankar Dayal Sharma; K. R. Narayanan
- Vice President: K. R. Narayanan; Krishan Kant
- Preceded by: H. D. Deve Gowda
- Succeeded by: Atal Bihari Vajpayee

Union Minister of Finance
- In office 21 April 1997 – 1 May 1997
- Prime Minister: Himself
- Preceded by: P. Chidambaram
- Succeeded by: P. Chidambaram

Union Minister of External Affairs
- In office 1 June 1996 – 19 March 1998
- Prime Minister: H. D. Deve Gowda; Himself
- Preceded by: Sikander Bakht
- Succeeded by: Atal Bihari Vajpayee
- In office 5 December 1989 – 10 November 1990
- Prime Minister: V. P. Singh
- Preceded by: V. P. Singh
- Succeeded by: Chandra Shekhar

Ambassador of India to the Soviet Union
- In office 1976–1980
- Prime Minister: Indira Gandhi; Morarji Desai; Charan Singh
- Preceded by: Durga Prasad Dhar
- Succeeded by: V. K. Ahuja

Leader of the House in Rajya Sabha
- In office April 1997 – March 1998
- Preceded by: H. D. Deve Gowda
- Succeeded by: Sikander Bakh
- In office June 1996 – November 1996
- Preceded by: Sikander Bakht
- Succeeded by: H. D. Deve Gowda

Member of Parliament, Rajya Sabha
- In office 8 July 1992 – 2 March 1998
- Constituency: Bihar
- In office 3 April 1964 – 2 April 1976
- Constituency: Punjab

Member of Parliament, Lok Sabha
- In office 10 March 1998 – 26 April 1999
- Preceded by: Darbara Singh
- Succeeded by: Balbir Singh
- Constituency: Jalandhar, Punjab
- In office 28 November 1989 – 21 June 1991
- Preceded by: Rajinder Singh Sparrow
- Succeeded by: Yash
- Constituency: Jalandhar, Punjab

Union Minister Of Information and Broadcasting Ministry of Information and Broadcasting (India)
- In office 8 November 1973 - 28 June 1975
- Preceded by: Indira Gandhi
- Succeeded by: Vidya Charan Shukla

Union Minister of Housing and Urban Affairs And Union Minister of State for Works and Housing (Independent Charge)
- In office 18 March 1971 - 2 May 1971
- Preceded by: Kodardas Kalidas Shah
- Succeeded by: Uma Shankar Dikshit

Union Minister of State for Works and Housing
- In office 18 March 1971 - 2 May 1971
- Preceded by: Parimal Ghosh
- Succeeded by: himself
- In office 2 May 1971 - 22 July 1972
- Preceded by: himself
- Succeeded by: D. P. Chattopadhyaya

Union Minister of State for Planning
- In office 28 June 1975 - 12 May 1976
- Preceded by: Vidya Charan Shukla
- Succeeded by: Sankar Ghose

Personal details
- Born: 4 December 1919 Pari Darveza, Punjab, British India
- Died: 30 November 2012 (aged 92) Gurugram, Haryana, India
- Party: Indian National Congress (1964–1988); Janata Dal (1988–1998)
- Spouse: Sheila Gujral (m. 1945; died 2011)
- Children: 2, including Naresh Gujral
- Parent(s): Avtar Narain Gujral (father); Pushpa Gujral (mother)
- Relatives: Satish Gujral (brother); Raseel Gujral Ansal (niece)
- Education: D.A.V. College; Hailey College of Commerce; Forman Christian College
- Monuments: Smriti Sthal

Inder Kumar Gujral (4 December 1919 – 30 November 2012) was an Indian diplomat, politician, and independence activist, who served as prime minister of India from April 1997 to March 1998.

Born in Punjab, he was influenced by politics as a student, and joined the All India Students Federation and the Communist Party of India. He was imprisoned for taking part in the Quit India movement. After independence, he joined the Indian National Congress party in 1964, and became a Member of Parliament in the Rajya Sabha.

He was the Minister of Information and Broadcasting during the emergency. In 1976, he was appointed as the Ambassador of India to the Soviet Union. In 1996, he became the Minister of External Affairs in the Deve Gowda ministry, and developed the Gujral doctrine during this period. He was appointed the prime minister of India in 1997. His tenure lasted for less than a year.

He retired from all political positions in 1998. He died in 2012 at the age of 92, following hospitalization due to a lung infection.

== Early and personal life ==
Inder Kumar was born on 4 December 1919 in a Punjabi Hindu Khatri family to Pushpa and Avtar Narain Gujral in the village of Pari Darveza in the Sohawa Tehsil of the Jhelum District in undivided Punjab in British India, which is in present-day Punjab, Pakistan.

He studied at D.A.V. College, Hailey College of Commerce and Forman Christian College, Lahore, all affiliated with the University of the Punjab. He was a member of All India Students Federation. He also participated in the Indian independence movement, and was jailed in 1942 during the Quit India Movement. As a student, he became a member of the Communist Party of India.

He also has two sisters, Uma Nanda and Sunita Judge. Gujral's younger brother Satish Gujral was a world-renowned painter and sculptor.

On 26 May 1945, Inder Kumar Gujral married Sheila Gujral, an acclaimed poet, who died on 11 July 2011 after an illness. The couple had two sons, Naresh, who is a Shiromani Akali Dal MP in the Rajya Sabha, and Vishal. The couple also have two granddaughters and a grandson.

Gujral's hobbies included poetry; he spoke Urdu and was, after his death, eulogised as a lover of the language by Maulana Azad National Urdu University, an institution where he held the position of chancellor.

== Early politics ==
Gujral became vice-president of the New Delhi Municipal Committee in 1958, and joined the Congress party (INC) in 1964. He was close to Indira Gandhi, and became a member of the Rajya Sabha in April 1964. During the Emergency of June 1975, Gujral was Minister of Information and Broadcasting, where he was in charge of the media during a time of censorship in India and was in charge of Doordarshan. He again was elected to the Rajya Sabha to serve until 1976. He also served as Water Resources Minister. Later, Gujral was appointed Ambassador of India to the Soviet Union by Indira Gandhi and stayed on during the tenures of Morarji Desai and Charan Singh. He was rumoured to have been shunted out of the ministry due to conflicts with the prime minister's son, Sanjay Gandhi, over media censorship, and was replaced by Vidya Charan Shukla, who had no qualms following party lines on the matter; he was then moved to the Planning Ministry.

== Janata Dal ==
Gujral resigned from the Indian National Congress party in the 1980s. Then he joined the Janata Dal. In the 1989 Indian general election, Gujral was elected from Jalandhar in Punjab. He served as Minister of External Affairs in Prime Minister V. P. Singh's eleventh cabinet of India. In 1989, Singh sent him to Srinagar to negotiate with the perpetrators of the 1989 kidnapping of Rubaiya Sayeed. He also brought about controversy during the Gulf War when he hugged Saddam Hussein as a show-of-good-faith to ensure Indian expatriates would be safe. In the 1991 Indian general election, Gujral contested from Patna in Bihar. However, the election was countermanded following complaints of 'irregularities'. In 1992, Gujral was elected to the Rajya Sabha with the help of Lalu Prasad Yadav.

Subsequent to the 1996 election, when the United Front government was formed under the premiership of H. D. Deve Gowda, Gujral was again named Minister of External Affairs. During this tenure, he developed the 'Gujral doctrine' which emphasised better relations with India's neighbours and was refined when he became prime minister. He also served as Union Minister or Minister of State of several other portfolios—Communications and Parliamentary Affairs, Information and Broadcasting, Works and Housing and Planning.

The Indian National Congress party had been supporting the United Front government from outside, but citing its wish to have the incumbent prime minister replaced, decided to withdraw support; this led to the government's collapse in April 1997. To avoid mid-term elections, a compromise was reached: the INC agreed to support another United Front government under a new leader, provided its concerns—such as not being consulted before taking important decisions and being marginalised—were addressed. The United Front elected Gujral as its new leader, and he was sworn in as Prime Minister on 21 April 1997.

== Prime Minister of India (1997–1998) ==
Gujral became prime minister as the consensus candidate between others that included Lalu Prasad Yadav, Mulayam Singh Yadav; his government was supported by the INC from outside. In the early weeks of his tenure, the Central Bureau of Investigation asked for permission from the Governor of Bihar, A. R. Kidwai, to prosecute the state Chief Minister Lalu Prasad Yadav in a corruption case related to the Fodder Scam, a move that Kidwai sanctioned. Even legal scholars said that Yadav could not escape prosecution. Subsequently, the demand for the resignation of Yadav was raised both from within and outside the United Front. United Front and Telugu Desam Party leader Chandrababu Naidu and Communist Party of India (Marxist) General Secretary Harkishen Singh Surjeet called for action against Yadav and for the resignation of other RJD members; while the same was said by JD members Sharad Yadav, H. D. Deve Gowda and Ram Vilas Paswan who called for the dismissal of accused RJD members Kanti Singh, Raghuvansh Prasad Singh and Captain Jai Narain Nishad. Though INC chairperson Sitaram Kesri offered minor calls for Yadav's resignation, Yadav then offered Gujral support to run from any Lok Sabha constituency in Bihar to get his support. Gujral, however, was silent on the matter, but later controversially transferred the CBI director Joginder Singh, who was investigating the case against Yadav, and replaced him with R. C. Sharma, who said Gujral would directly control the CBI and that the pace of investigating many sensational cases "will definitely slacken now." However, Yadav was still expelled from the party by JD leader Sharad Yadav, before forming his own Rashtriya Janata Dal in 1997.

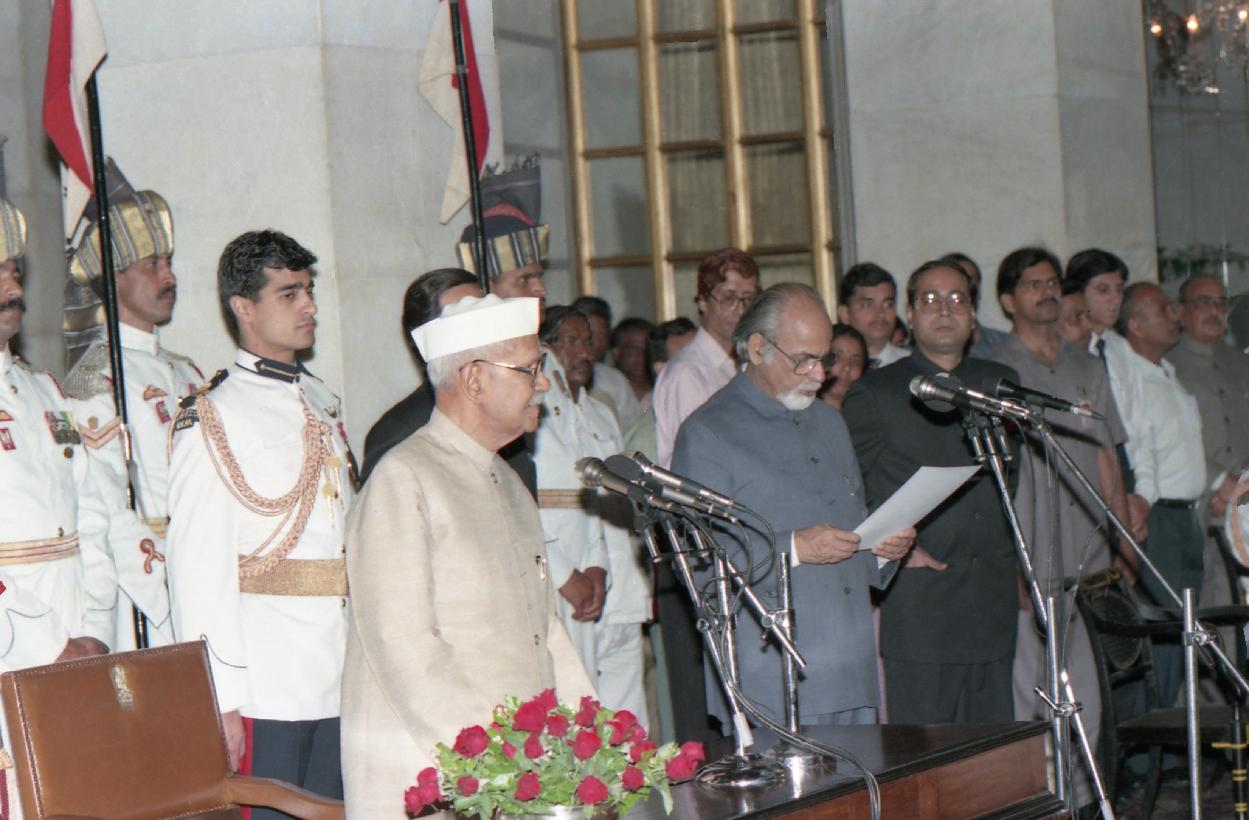
President of India Shankar Dayal Sharma administering the oath of office of Prime Minister of India to Shri I. K. Gujral at the Rashtrapati Bhavan

Another controversial decision of his government was its recommendation of President's rule in Uttar Pradesh in 1997. The Bharatiya Janata Party (BJP) Uttar Pradesh government, headed by Kalyan Singh, sought a vote of confidence after violence and unruly scenes took place in the assembly. However, President K.R. Narayanan refused to sign the recommendation and sent it back to the government for reconsideration. The Allahabad High Court also gave a decision against President's rule in Uttar Pradesh. He also resisted signing the Comprehensive Test Ban Treaty.

On 28 August 1997, the Jain Commission report was submitted to the government and was leaked on 16 November. The commission had inquired into the conspiracy aspects of the Rajiv Gandhi assassination and reportedly criticised the Dravida Munnetra Kazhagam (DMK), amongst others such as the Narasimha Rao government, for tacitly supporting Tamil militants accused in Gandhi's assassination. The DMK was part of the ruling coalition at the center and had ministers in the Union Cabinet. The Congress first demanded the tabling of the report on the floor of the parliament, which was refused by Gujral, who feared a battle between the DMK and the Tamil Maanila Congress would lead to the DMK's withdrawal from the government. Gujral later formed a Joint Parliamentary Committee to study the report after informing Sitaram Keshri of the decision, to which Keshri acceded. INC parliamentary party leader Sharad Pawar said they would call for the resignation of anyone implicated in the report. Gujral convened the government to inform them of the updates and said it supported the DMK. The DMK's Industry Minister Murasoli Maran said: "We are part of the United Front. We will stand and fall together. I am hundred per cent confident of that. If it were so easy to break the United Front, then it will be called the disunited front. No one is going to ditch their colleagues for a few loaves of power. We have no reason to quit at all. The report is full of recycled news. There is nothing startling about it, everybody already knows what the report is saying. A Madras court is expected to give its verdict on a criminal case on the assassination on January 28. Let us wait till then to know who was involved in the dastardly act. Until then, all this is disinformation." However, the Tamil Maanila Congress called for the DMK, which was in a coalition government in Tamil Nadu, to share all actions it would undertake. The report was tabled on 20 November 1997. On the same day there were angry scenes in parliament, as the INC then called for the DMK's removal from the cabinet and refused to partake in any parliamentary debate until that happened. Speaker P.A. Sangma then adjourned the house. The INC finally withdrew support from his government on 28 November after Gujral sent Kesri a letter saying he would not dismiss any DMK leaders. Gujral resigned following the withdrawal, and sent a letter to President K. R. Narayanan that read: "My government has lost its majority and does not want to continue in office on moral grounds", but did not call for the dissolution of parliament. The president accepted the resignation, but asked for Gujral to stay on in an interim capacity. INC General Secretary Oscar Fernandes then said: "All the secular parties are welcome to support a government which will be attempted by the Congress." The United Front's leader Chandrababu Naidu got the support of all the constituents saying they would neither support the INC nor the Bharatiya Janata Party, as did the TMC, saying they would not allow a "U.P.-like situation to happen in the centre." In similar measure, BJP leader M. Venkaiah Naidu said the party would "throttle" INC attempts to form a new government. The president then dissolved parliament on 4 December, triggering a snap election.

As a Prime minister, Gujral had a practice of reserving Friday mornings for meeting the general public.

== Gujral doctrine ==
The Gujral doctrine is a set of five principles to guide the conduct of foreign relations with India's immediate neighbours, notably Pakistan, as spelt out by Gujral. The doctrine was later termed as such by journalist Bhabani Sen Gupta in his article, India in the Twenty First Century in International Affairs. These principles are, as he set out at Chatham House in September 1996 (which he later reiterated at the Bandaranaike Centre for International Studies):

The United Front Government's neighbourhood policy now stands on five basic principles: First, with the neighbours like Nepal, Bangladesh, Bhutan, Maldives and Sri Lanka, India does not ask for reciprocity but gives all that it can in good faith and trust. Secondly, no South Asian country will allow its territory to be used against the interest of another country of the region. Thirdly, none will interfere in the internal affairs of another. Fourthly, all South Asian countries must respect each other's territorial integrity and sovereignty. And finally, they will settle all their disputes through peaceful bilateral negotiations. These five principles, scrupulously observed, will, I am sure, recast South Asia's regional relationship, including the tormented relationship between India and Pakistan, in a friendly, cooperative mould.

He wrote in his autobiography of the doctrine: "The logic behind the Gujral doctrine was that since we had to face two hostile neighbours in the north and the west, we had to be at 'total peace' with all other immediate neighbours in order to contain Pakistan's and China's influence in the region."

Following a series of attacks throughout the 2000s, said by the Indian media and government to have originated from and been planned in Pakistan, culminating with the 2008 Mumbai attacks, the Gujral doctrine was criticised by the Indian media. Following the attack, India Today said that targeted, covert strikes against Pakistani organisations such as Lashkar-e-Taiba were a "capability that I.K. Gujral dismantled as prime minister over a decade ago will take over a year to rebuild." The major setback of the Gujral doctrine is said to be the debilitating impact it had on the R&AW's (Research and Analysis Wing) ability to conduct operations in Pakistan. On his orders Pakistan's special operations desk of R&AW was shut down leading to major gaps in India's intelligence capabilities. Analysts have time and again blamed this as the foremost factor for India's "intelligence failure" before the Kargil War commenced. It is said that this was because of Gujral's negligence towards such repercussions and his urge to leave an imprint on Indo-Pak relations that he did this. However, it was also praised in the media.

The snap election was held in February–March 1998. Gujral contested again from Jalandhar as Janata Dal candidate with the support of the Shiromani Akali Dal. The Akali Dal, though a part of BJP-led coalition, opted to support Gujral because during his Prime Ministerial tenure, Gujral declared that the central government will share the expenses against the insurgency in Punjab during the 1980s and early 1990s, along with the state government of Punjab.

Gujral was a member of the Club de Madrid after his tenure as the Prime Minister ended.

== Global policy ==
Along with his brother Satish Gujral, he was one of the signatories of the Agreement to convene a convention for drafting a world constitution. As a result, for the first time in human history, a World Constituent Assembly convened to draft and adopt the Constitution for the Federation of Earth.

== Illness and death ==
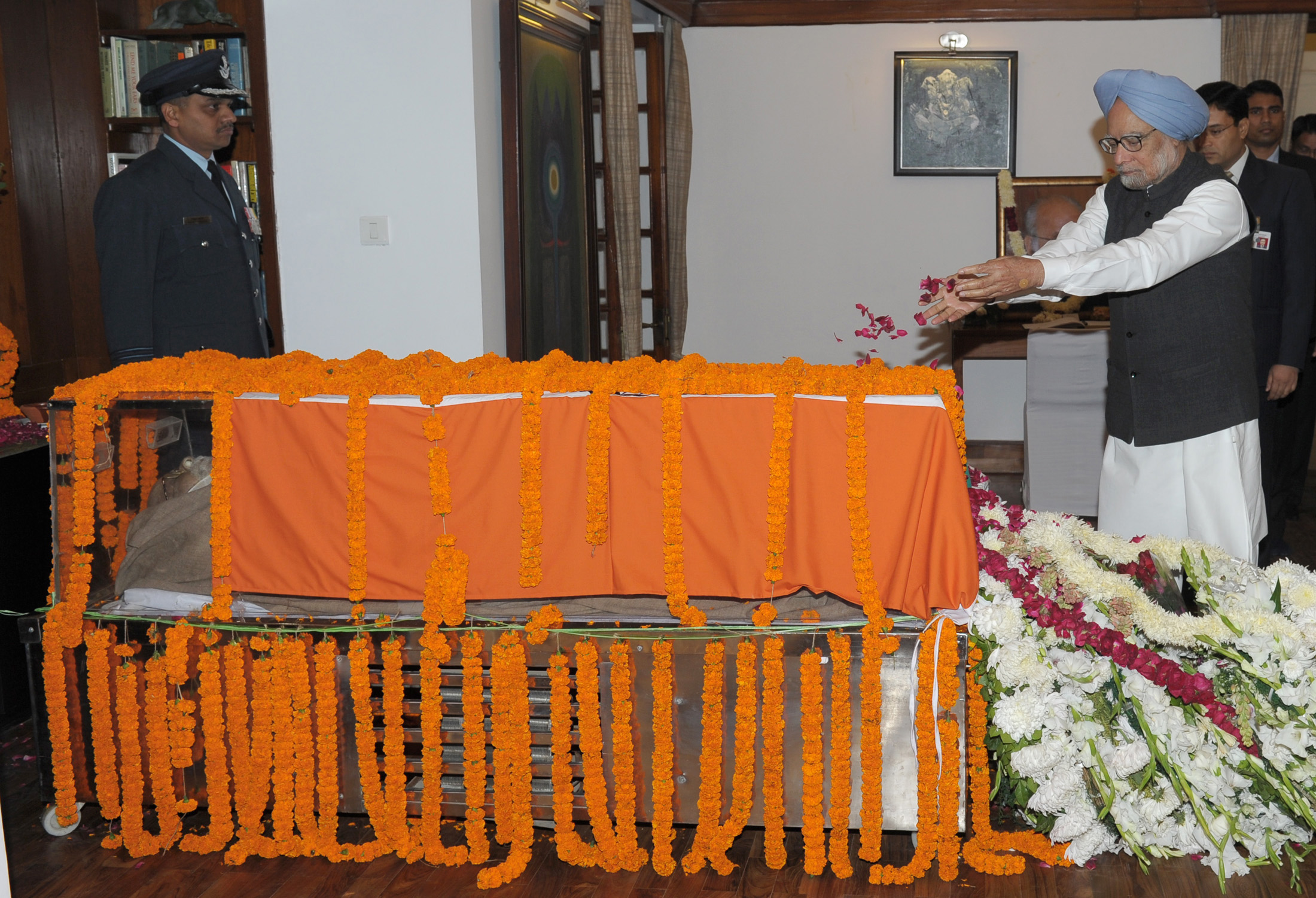
Former PM Manmohan Singh paying floral tribute to Gujral.

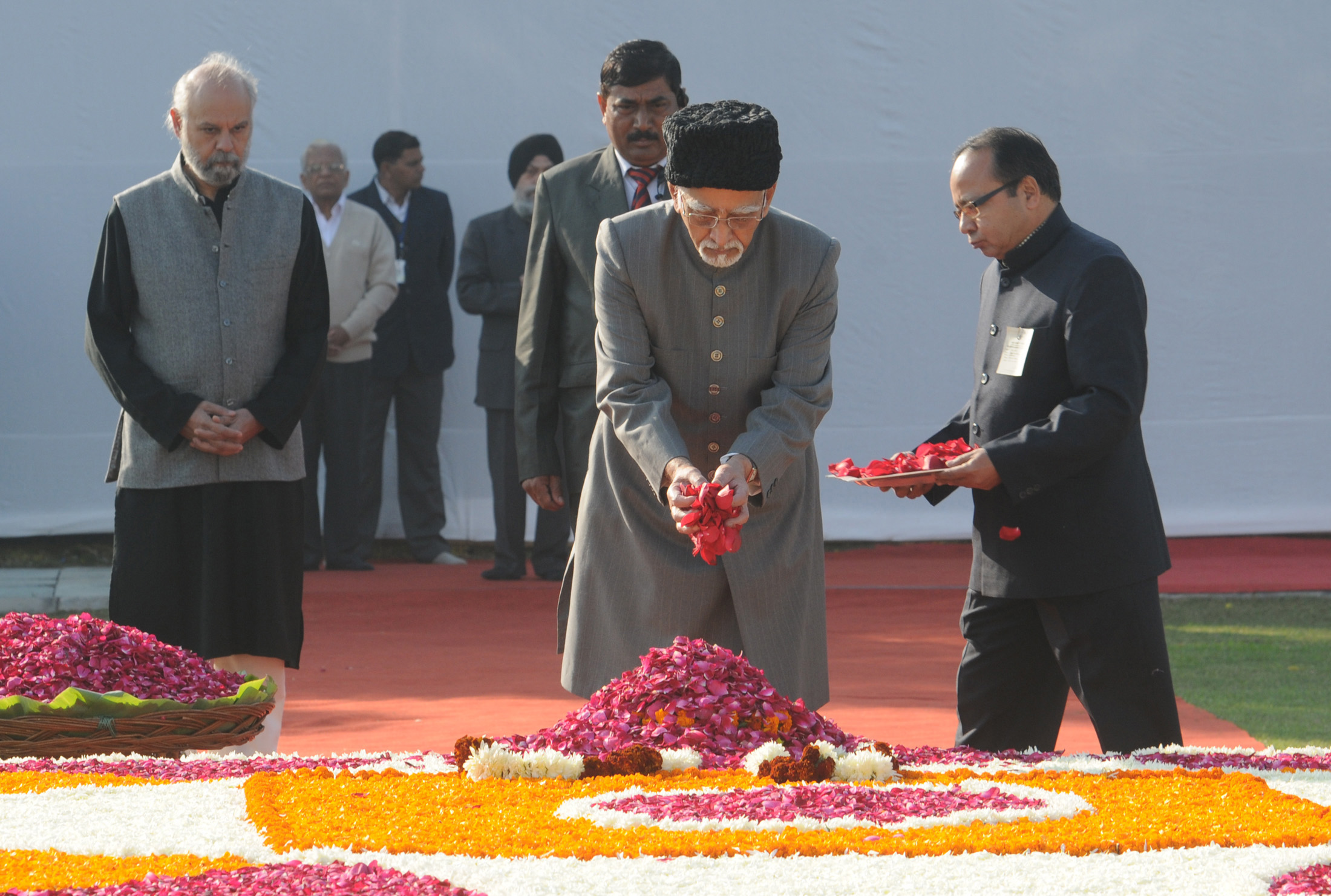
The Vice President of India Hamid Ansari giving tribute to Gujral on his first death Anniversary (2013).

Gujral was admitted at Medanta Hospital in Gurgaon, Haryana (part of the National Capital Region), on 19 November 2012, after being diagnosed with a lung infection. He had had a serious chest infection a few days before being admitted to the hospital following more than a year of dialysis. His health deteriorated in the hospital and was reported to be "very critical". On 27 November, he fell unconscious and his urine output system stopped working. Gujral died on 30 November 2012, four days before his 93rd birthday. His body lay in state at his official residence, 5 Janpath, until noon the next day. The Government of India declared a seven-day period of state mourning and cancelled official functions until 6 December. He was given a state funeral at 15:00 on 1 December near Samata Sthal. His death was announced to parliament by Home Minister Sushil Kumar Shinde, following which both houses adjourned. On 3 December, condolence references were held for him.

Reactions came from President Pranab Mukherjee, Prime Minister Manmohan Singh, Bihar Chief Minister Nitish Kumar and RJD chairman Lalu Prasad Yadav. Other immediate reactions came from MPs: Law Minister Ashwani Kumar, Veerappa Moily, Ghulam Nabi Azad. Minister for New and Renewable Energy Farooq Abdullah offered his condolences and said Gujral was "a politician, a diplomat and a humanist who would be remembered for his many accomplishments in the diplomatic and political arena;" while Minister of State for Chemicals and Fertilisers Srikant Kumar Jena said Gujral had an "exceptional personality, courage and intellect" and that: "Today we feel extremely saddened on the demise of former Prime Minister Shri Inder Kumar Gujral, who was a man of exceptional courage and intellect." The Union Cabinet issued a statement that read: "In his death, India has lost a great patriot, a visionary leader and a freedom fighter." INC chairperson Sonia Gandhi wrote to Gujral's son, MP Naresh Gujral: "...the late leader had the ability to win goodwill and friendship across the political spectrum. It is these qualities and the genuine warmth of his personality that made him such a widely admired and respected Prime Minister of India, MP and ambassador." Sri Lankan President Mahinda Rajapaksa sent a message to Indian Prime Minister Manmohan Singh in which he wrote: "Shri Gujral was ahead of his times in a rapidly globalising world. Sri Lanka will always remember with gratitude, Shri I K Gujral's contribution towards strengthening India-Sri Lanka relations and regional cooperation." Pakistani Prime Minister Raja Parvez Ashraf mentioned Gujral's "admirable role" in boosting India-Pakistan relations, while he also said South Asia had lost a noble and distinguished politician. Bangladesh Prime Minister Sheikh Hasina sent an unnamed senior leader of her Awami League party for the funeral. Salman Khurshid and Lal Krishna Advani were amongst the dignitaries at his funeral.

== Election History ==
=== Rajya Sabha ===
Position	Party	Constituency	From	To	Tenure
Member of Parliament, Rajya Sabha (1st Term)	INC	Punjab	3 April 1964	2 April 1970	5 years, 364 days
Member of Parliament, Rajya Sabha (2nd Term)	INC	Punjab	3 April 1970	2 April 1976	5 years, 365 days
Member of Parliament, Rajya Sabha (3rd Term)	JD	Bihar	8 July 1992	2 March 1998	5 years, 237 days

== Awards and honours ==
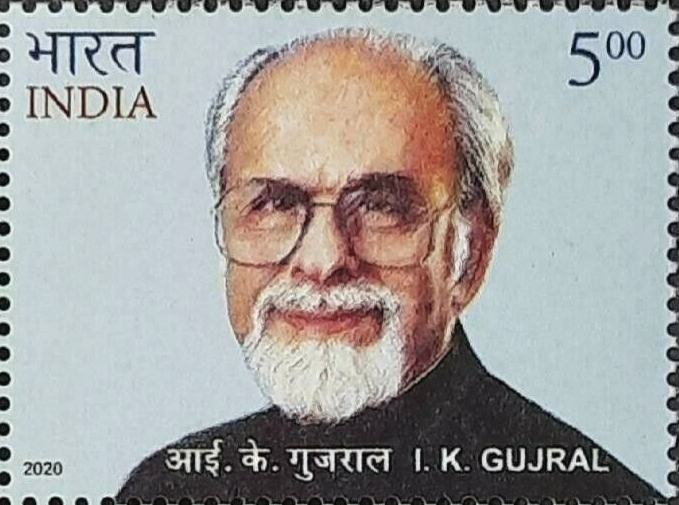
Gujral on a 2020 stamp of India

=== Foreign honours ===
- Russia
  - Order of Friendship
- Bangladesh:
  - Bangladesh Liberation War Honour (21 October 2012)

== Autobiography ==
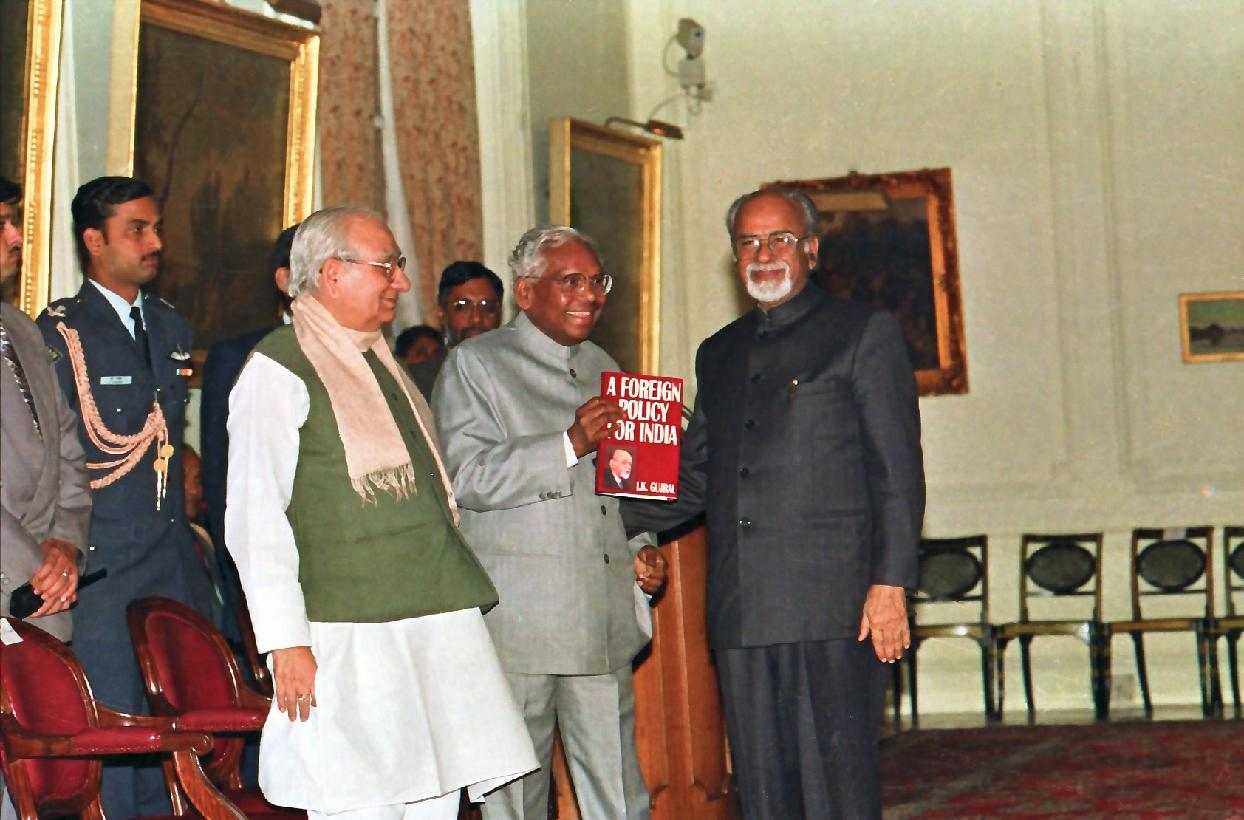

- Matters of Discretion, I. K. Gujral, Hay House, India, 519 pages, Feb. 2011. ISBN 978-93-8048-080-0. Distributors: Penguin books, India.

Political offices
Preceded by Vishwanath Pratap Singh	Minister of External Affairs; 1989–1990	Succeeded by Vidya Charan Shukla
Preceded by Sikander Bakht	Minister of External Affairs; 1996–1998	Succeeded by Atal Bihari Vajpayee
Preceded by Haradanahalli Doddegowda Deve Gowda	Prime Minister of India; 1997–1998	Succeeded by Atal Bihari Vajpayee
Preceded by Haradanahalli Doddegowda Deve Gowda	Chairperson of the Planning Commission; 1997–1998	Succeeded by Atal Bihari Vajpayee
Preceded by Palaniappan Chidambaram	Minister of Finance; 1997–1997	Succeeded by Palaniappan Chidambaram
