= MTNL Perfect Health Mela =

Perfect Health Mela (25th)
- Time: 8 am to 10 pm
- Location: New Delhi, India
- Also known as: Health Mela
- Cause: Health awareness
- First reporter: Dr K K Aggarwal
- Organised by: Heart Care Foundation of India, MTNL, Dept. of Health & Family Welfare, Govt. of Delhi, New Delhi Municipal Council, South, East and North Delhi Municipal Corporation
- Participants: Healthcare organisations, schools, colleges, corporates, general public

The MTNL Perfect Health Mela is a five-day annual event centered around prevalent health issues and their prevention. This health fair is held between Dussehra and Diwali in the month of October every year, and features seminars, lectures, entertainment shows, health workshops, free on-ground checkups, pop–up stores, and competitions for schools, colleges, and corporates. The event aims to create mass awareness on common healthcare issues in India. The brainchild of cardiologist Dr K K Aggarwal, the event is organized and managed by the Heart Care Foundation of India (HCFI). It is one of the most visited community health events, with a footfall of more than a lakh each year from all segments of society. Over the past two decades, the Mela has conducted many health awareness campaigns including hand hygiene, influenza management, heart health, dengue, and malaria.

== History ==
Perfect Health Mela was held for the first time in 1993. This was commemorated by a stamp issue.

The primary focus was to debate and deliver a comprehensive strategy for the national management of new age health epidemics such as dengue and swine flu.
