= Centre for Excellence in Telecom Technology and Management =

Coordinates: 19.118936°N 72.915380°E

Centre for Excellence in Telecom Technology & Management
- Type: State-owned Public
- Industry: Telecommunication
- Founded: 2003-04
- Headquarters: Powai, Mumbai, India
- Services: Telecom, IT and management training
- Owner: The Government of India
- Parent: MTNL
- Website: cettm.mtnl.in

Centre for Excellence in Telecom Technology and Management (CETTM) located in Hiranandani Gardens, Powai, Mumbai is the telecom training centre of MTNL, the incumbent operator of Government of India (GOI). It was founded in 2003 as one of the largest telecom training centres in India and amongst the biggest in Asia. The Centre provides extensive training to corporate employees, students, and MTNL's internal employees in telecom switching, transmission, wireless communication, telecom operations and management .

CETTM also conducts training in telecom, IT and management under the Ministry of External Affairs (India)- Indian Technical and Economic Cooperation (ITEC) program for telecom professionals from developing countries.

== History ==
Indian telecom industry was closely held by GOI until liberalisation in the 90's. The telecom training and manpower development was delivered through:

- Advanced Level Telecom Training Centre (ALTTC) at Ghaziabad. It was set up in 1975–76 with the assistance of UNDP to meet the continuing and long term need for high level technical personnel required for planning and development of ever expanding telecom network and service in the country. It also provides training facilities to senior engineering staff and instructors of other telecom administrations in Asian region.
- Telecom Training Centre at Jabalpur, MP renamed as Bharat Ratna Bhim Rao Ambedkar Institute of Telecom Training (B.R.B.R.A.I.T.T.) from 30 May 1992 had its origin at Calcutta where it initially started functioning in the 1920s.
- Regional Telecom Training Centres (RTTC's) at Ahmedabad, Bangalore, Bombay, Ghaziabad, Hyderabad, Kalyani, Lucknow, Chennai, Nagpur, Patna, Rajpura and Trivandrum.
- Circle Telecom Training Centres (CTTC's) in telecom circles.
- District Telecom Training Centres (DTTC's) in telecom districts.

After the formation of two incumbent operators BSNL and MTNL from erstwhile DoT, RTTC's and DTTC's in their respective regions were allotted to them. BSNL retained control of ALTTC Ghaziabad and Training Centre at Jabalpur. MTNL with operations in Delhi and Mumbai met its training need through RTTC's and DTTC's. In Mumbai circle the DTTC at Bandra and RTTC at Sakinaka served the telecom training needs initially.

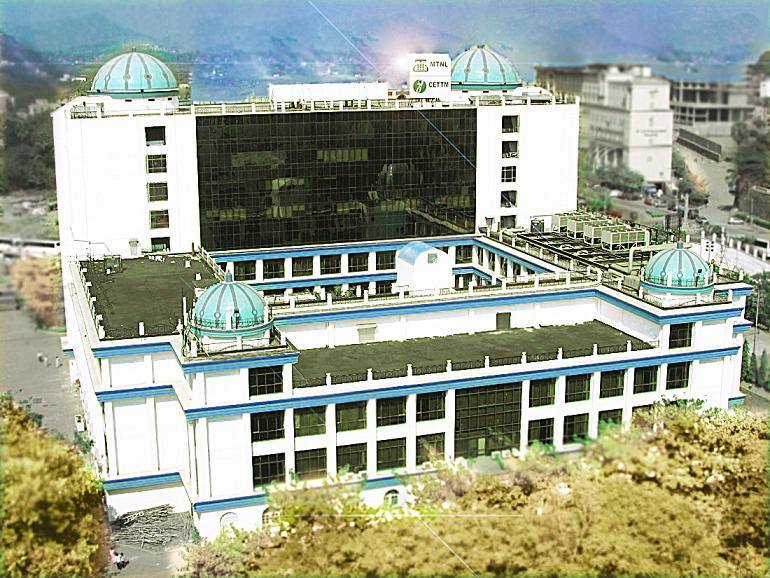
CETTM Training Centre

Over the years MTNL felt the need to develop a training hub catering to both its Delhi and Mumbai units. Consequently, in the year 2003, MTNL established the Centre for Excellence in Telecom Training and Management (CETTM), with capex plan of over Rs 100 crore, at Hiranandani Gardens, Powai, Mumbai, replacing the existing RTTC's and DTTC's. CETTM has evolved as a key telecom training centre in Asia, expanding its sphere of operations beyond the originally planned internal staff and employees, CETTM now offers training to corporate clients, telecom professionals, students and academia.

== Telecom training ==
Telecom technologies such as Synchronous Digital Hierarchy (SDH), Optical fiber technology, GSM, CDMA, Wireless local loop (WLL), Common Channel Signaling (CCS#7), MPLS, broadband (ADSL), Internet Protocol (IP) networking, New Technology Switching System (NTSS), 3G networks, Digital loop carrier (DLC), Next Generation Networking (NGN), Telecom Billing and revenue management are covered under the following branches:

- Switching
- Transmission
- Wireless Communication
- Technology Familiarisation
- Computers & IT

The centre also conducts several programs on the latest trends in technology/management with guest faculty from institutions like IIT, IIM's and other institutions. CETTM has MoU with IIT, Powai, Mumbai for courses related with new technology.

Many Government bodies and Public Sector Undertakings (PSU's) including Railtel Corporation of India, NTPC, Indian Oil, Central Railway, Bharat Electronics Limited, PowerGrid Corporation of India (PGCIL), State Bank of India, Indian Navy use the training facilities of CETTM.

== Training infrastructure ==
CETTM is situated at technology street, Hiranandani Gardens near LH Hiranandani Hospital. IIT Bombay and Powai lake are at short walking distances from the centre. The centre's characteristic blue domes have made it a local landmark.

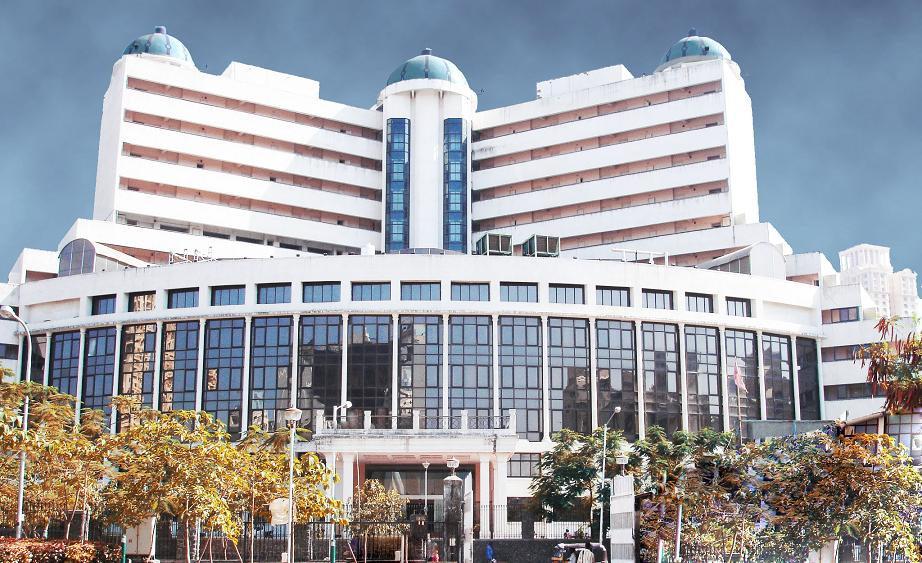
CETTM Hostel

The centre has two buildings. The main building where trainings are conducted has built area of 218,552 sq ft (20,304.1 m^{2}) with eight floors. Across the road, is situated the hostel that houses trainees, having 12 floor and built area of 268,369 sq ft (24,932.3 m^{2}).

The main CETTM building has 18 lecture halls, 8 computer labs, an auditorium, conference hall and library. It has got technology labs for broadband (ADSL), SDH, OFC, MPLS, ISDN, A/V, OCB 283, Digital UHF/MW, GSM, DWDM. The centre has functional GSM/BTS & PSTN exchange model, and also organizes study tours to MTNL's TAX/TANDEM exchanges.

== ITEC Program ==
Launched in 1964, Indian Technical and Economic Cooperation programme (ITEC) is a bilateral programme of assistance of the Ministry of External Affairs (India), Government of India. Under ITEC and its corollary SCAAP (Special Commonwealth Assistance for Africa Programme) 156 countries in Asia, East Europe, Central Asia, Africa and Latin America are invited to share in the Indian telecommunications developmental experience acquired over decades of India's telecom evolution. CETTM as part of MTNL, which was carved out of the Department of Telecommunications in 1986, is ITEC's telecom partner providing industry experience and learning.

The centre has trained 300 foreign national professionals from about 60 countries in telecom technology since its inception. The participating professionals represent distinguished telecom bodies of ITEC member countries. Partial list of beneficiaries include, Libyan Railways; Kuwait Telecom; Hondutel, Syrian Telecom; Zanzibar Telecom Limited; Telecommunication Company of Iran; Ministry of Post and Communication, Cameroon; Botswana Telecommunication Corporation; Indigo Tajikistan; Wireless Ecuador S.A; JSC Russia.
