= 20, Ashoka Road =

- Location of 20, Ashok Road in New Delhi

General information
- Location: New Delhi, India
- Coordinates: 28°37′18″N 77°12′50″E
- Client: Ministry of Communications and Information Technology (India)

Design and construction
- Architect: Firoz Kudianwala

20, Ashoka Road, officially Sanchar Bhawan, is the headquarters of the Union Ministry of Communications and Information Technology of India. It is also the headquarters of Department of Telecommunications of the ministry. The building is situated in the heart of the Indian capital, New Delhi. It is very similar in design to the Reserve Bank of India's Mumbai headquarters, and both were designed by the same architect, Firoz Kudianwala.

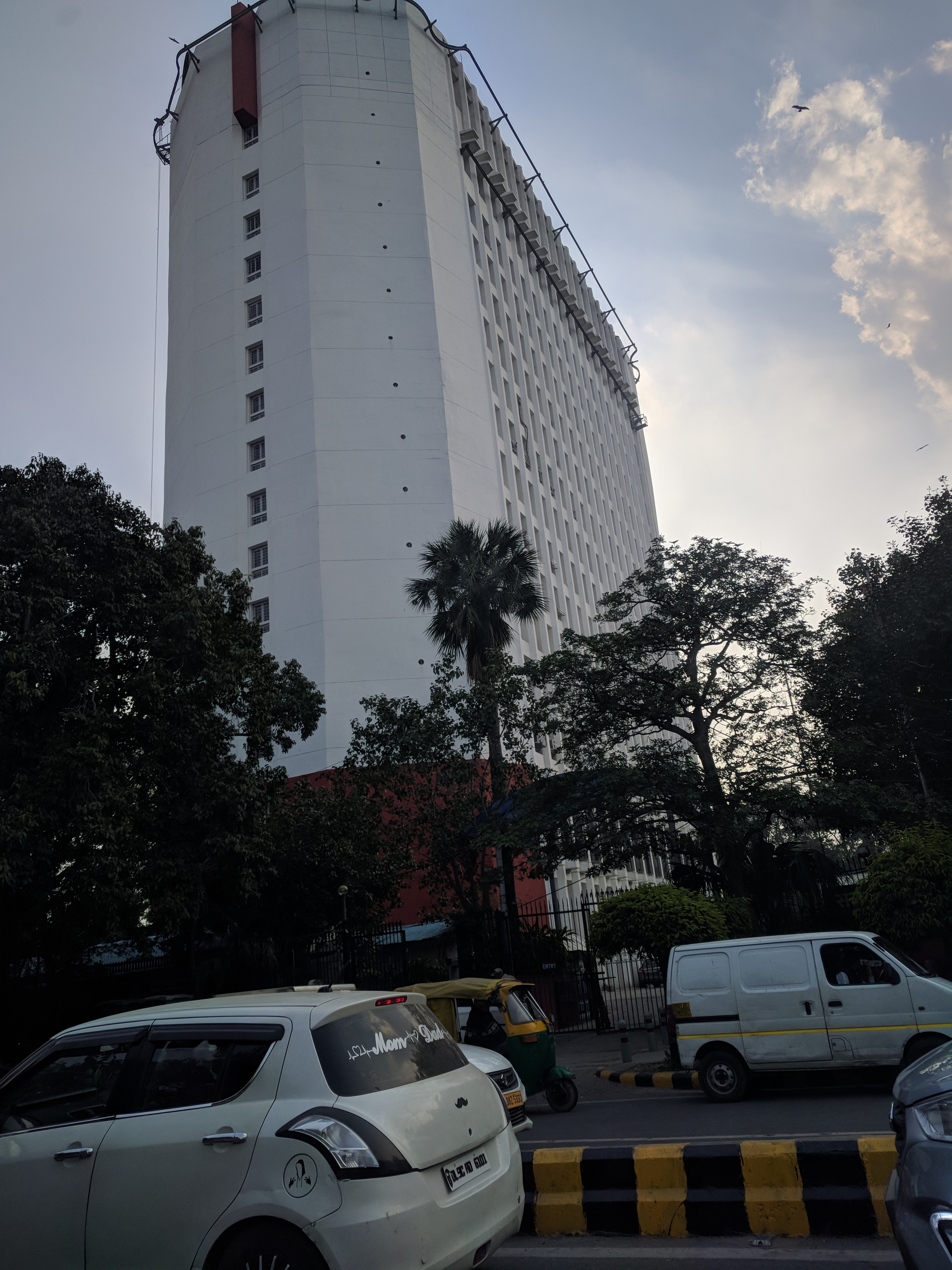
:Sanchar Bhawan.jpg
