= Wansuk Syiem =

Indian politician

MP of Rajya Sabha for Meghalaya
- In office 11 April 2013 – 12 April 2020
- Preceded by: Thomas A. Sangma
- Succeeded by: Wanweiroy Kharlukhi
- Constituency: Meghalaya

Personal details
- Born: Wansuk Syiem; 25 June 1956 (age 69) Shillong, Meghalaya, India
- Party: INC
- Spouse: Alexander Nongrum
- Children: 4

Wansuk Syiem (born 25 June 1956) is an Indian politician from Meghalaya. She represented the state's lone seat in the Rajya Sabha in the Parliament of India for two consecutive terms.

== Early life ==
Wansuk was born in 1956.

== Political life ==
Syiem joined the Indian National Congress in 1977. She was an active member of the party's youth wing, the National Students' Union of India. Later, she was the general secretary of the Meghalaya Pradesh Congress Committee. She has also been the vice-president of the All India Mahila Congress. Syiem has also been a member of the All India Congress Committee in the past. She has held several administrative positions in the state such as the chairperson of the Meghalaya State Social Welfare Board.

In 2013 Syiem was chosen to represent the Congress in the by-election for the Rajya Sabha seat after the resignation of Thomas A. Sangma (then, part of Nationalist Congress Party). The latter had joined the National People's Party to contest the state elections. Syiem received the support of chief minister Mukul Sangma, and was endorsed by Sonia Gandhi for the nomination. Following her nomination, Syiem resigned as member of the National Commission for Women. She was announced elected to Rajya Sabha on 11 April 2013 unopposed, though the election was slated for 19 April in case of an opposing candidate. She took oath on 23 April 2013, administered by Vice President Hamid Ansari at the age of 55, making her the first woman to represent the state in the upper house.

Syiem was a Member of Parliament, representing Meghalaya State in the Rajya Sabha (the upper house of India's Parliament) for the second term of 2014–2020.

She belongs to the Indian National Congress political party.
