= T. N. Seema =

Indian social worker, teacher, and politician

T. N. Seema (ഡോ . ടി .എൻ സീമ)
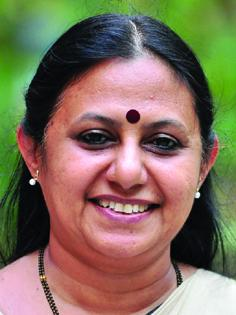

MP of Rajya Sabha for Kerala
- In office 3 April 2010 – 2 April 2016

Personal details
- Born: 1 June 1963 (age 62)
- Party: Communist Party of India (Marxist)
- Spouse: Shri G. Jayaraj
- Profession: Social worker, politician, teacher
- Website: tnseema.in

T. N. Seema ഡോ . ടി .എൻ സീമ (born 1 June 1963) is an Indian social worker, teacher, and politician who was an MP from Rajya Sabha elected from Kerala from 2010 to 2016 for the Communist Party of India (Marxist).

== Early life and education ==
Seema was born on 1 June 1963 in Thrissur in the Indian state of Kerala.

She married G. Jayaraj on 23 December 1986, who is the current director of C-DIT appointed by the state government. She has one daughter.

T N Seema is also the Kerala State President and National Vice President AIDWA, and the State Committee Member of CPI(M) in Kerala.

== Career ==
She has been an editor of a women's monthly, "Sthreesabdam" as a member of State Executive Committee of Kudumbashree Poverty Alleviations Mission, Kerala.

She serves as chairperson of the Haritha Keralam mission and in 2020, was made CPM's mayor candidate in Thiruvananthapuram.
