= Alok Sanjar =

Indian politician (born 1963)

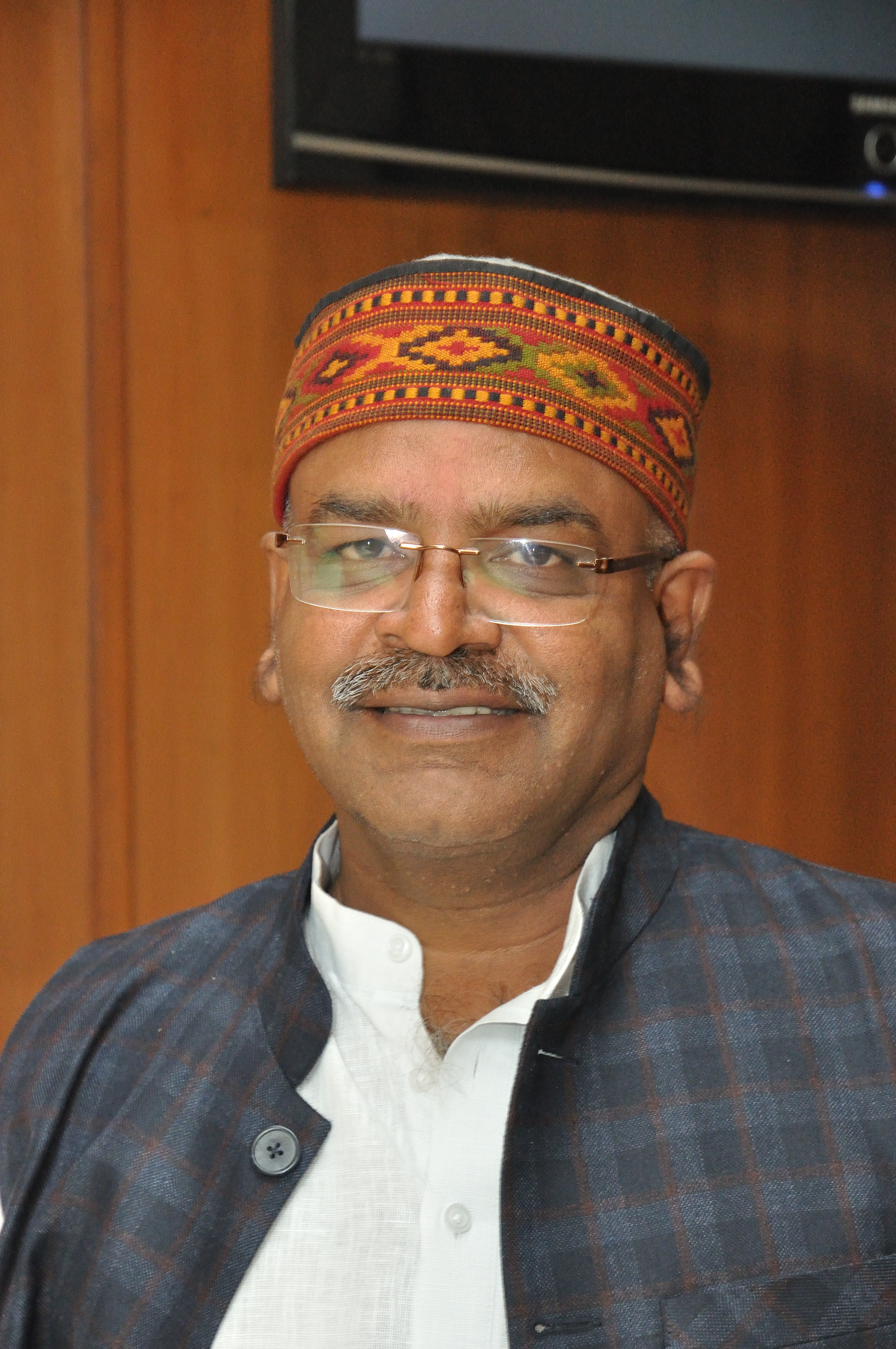

Member of Parliament, Lok Sabha
- In office 16 May 2014 – 23 May 2019
- Succeeded by: Pragya Singh Thakur
- Constituency: Bhopal

Personal details
- Born: 4 April 1963 (age 63) Bhopal, Madhya Pradesh, India
- Party: Bharatiya Janata Party
- Spouse: Smt. Kiran Shrivastava
- Children: 2
- Education: Barkatullah University
- Occupation: Advocate
- As of 16 December, 2016

Alok Sanjar (born 4 April 1963; Hindi pronunciation: [aːloːk sən.d͡ʒəɾ]) is a Bharatiya Janata Party politician and was member of Indian parliament from Bhopal (Lok Sabha constituency) from 2014-2019. under modi government. His wife is Kiran Sanjar and they have two sons, Ananat and Arpit.
