= D. P. Tripathi =

Indian politician (1952–2020)

Devi Prasad Tripathi

MP of Rajya Sabha for Maharashtra
- In office 3 April 2012 – 2 April 2018
- Succeeded by: Narayan Rane, BJP
- Constituency: Maharashtra

Personal details
- Born: 29 November 1952 Sultanpur, Uttar Pradesh, India
- Died: 2 January 2020 (aged 67) New Delhi, India
- Profession: Politician

Devi Prasad Tripathi (29 November 1952 – 2 January 2020) was an Indian politician and General Secretary of the Nationalist Congress Party of India.

== Early life ==
Devi Prasad Tripathi was born in Sultanpur Uttar Pradesh. As a student, Tripathi was president of Jawaharlal Nehru University Students' Union, and later taught at Allahabad University as a professor of politics.

== Career ==
He was also the editor of the quarterly journal Think India. He spoke Indian and several foreign languages, and lectured in a number of foreign universities.

Having become involved in politics at the age of sixteen, Tripathi became one of Prime Minister Rajiv Gandhi's aides. He left the Congress Party, however, over his opposition to Sonia Gandhi, the President of the Party, becoming prime minister (because of her foreign origin). He joined the Nationalist Congress Party in 1999, and reached the position of its General Secretary and chief spokesman. He was responsible for negotiating over seat-sharing in Maharashtra.
