= Sankar Prasad Datta =

Indian politician

Sankar Prasad Dutta শংকর প্রসাদ দত্ত

Member of the Indian Parliament for Tripura West
- In office 2014–2019
- Preceded by: Khagen Das
- Succeeded by: Pratima Bhowmik

Member of Tripura Legislative Assembly
- In office 2008–2013

Personal details
- Born: 18 August 1957 (age 69)
- Party: CPI(M)
- Spouse: Smt. Krishna Rakshit
- Children: 1 Daughter
- Education: Calcutta University -(M.A., LL.B.)

Sankar Prasad Datta is an Indian politician and member of the Communist Party of India (Marxist). He was a member of the Tripura Legislative Assembly from 2008 to 2013. He had won the 2014 Indian general elections from Tripura West (Lok Sabha constituency) before losing to Pratima Bhowmik of the BJP in the 2019 elections.
