= C. P. Narayanan =

Indian politician (born 1938)

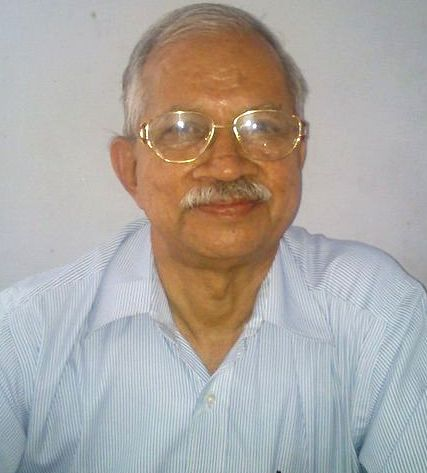

MP of Rajya Sabha for Kerala
- In office 2 July 2012 – 1 July 2018
- Succeeded by: Elamaram Kareem, CPI(M)

Personal details
- Party: CPI(M)

C.P. Narayanan (born 28 September 1938, Birth Place - Wadakanchery, Thrissur, Kerala) is an Indian Politician belonging to the Communist Party of India (Marxist).He was elected as a member of the Rajya Sabha the Upper house of Indian Parliament from Kerala in July 2012.

== Biography ==
He was born in September 1938 at Vadakkancherry, Thrissur district. After completing his BSc (HONS) from University of Kerala in 1958, and Post Graduate Degree in Mathematics and Statistics, he worked as a lecturer in mathematics at Malabar Christian College, Kozhikode from 1960 to 1969. After that he spent five years at the Kerala Bhasha Institute, Thiruvananthapuram.
