= Naresh Gujral =

Indian politician

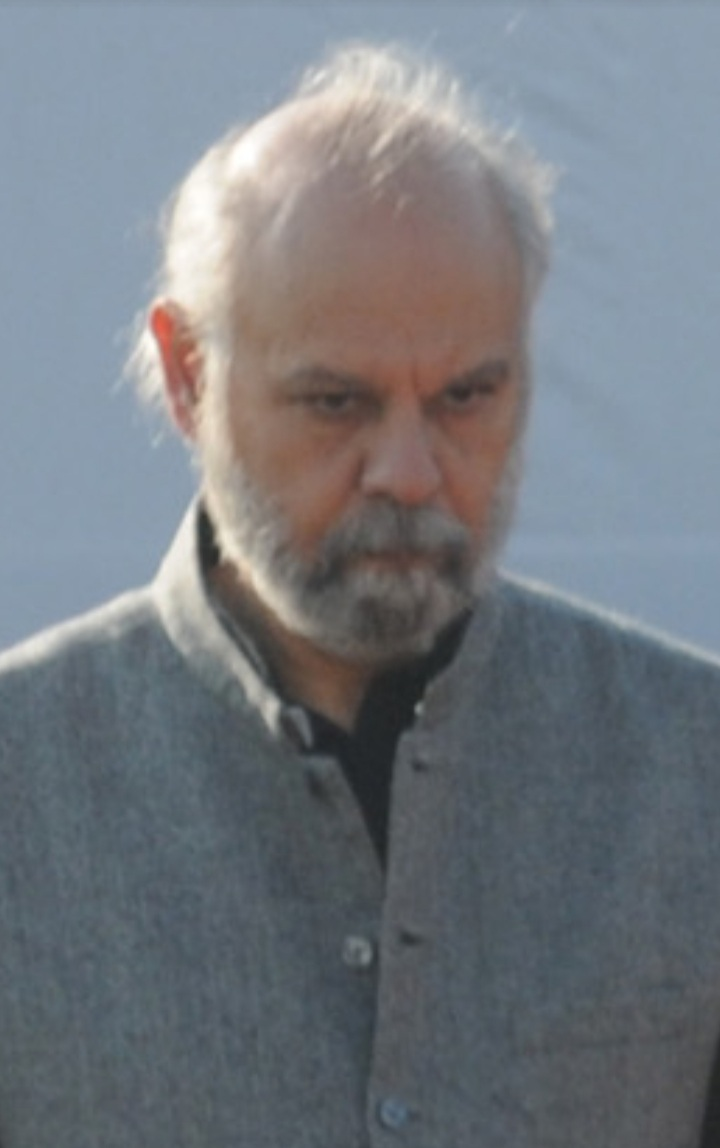
- Gujral in 2012

Member of Parliament, Rajya Sabha
- In office 22 March 2007 – 9 April 2022
- Succeeded by: Raghav Chadha
- Constituency: Punjab

Personal details
- Born: 19 May 1948 (age 78) Jalandhar, East Punjab, India
- Party: Shiromani Akali Dal
- Spouse: Anjali Gujral (m. 1987)
- Children: Deeksha; Diva
- Parents: Inder Kumar Gujral (father); Sheila Gujral (mother)
- Relatives: Avtar Narain Gujral (grandfather); Satish Gujral (uncle)
- Education: Delhi University- B.A. Institute of Chartered Accountants of India - F.C.A.

Naresh Gujral (born 19 May 1948) is a Chartered Accountant, Shiromani Akali Dal party politician and former member of the Parliament of India representing Punjab in the Rajya Sabha, the upper house of the Indian Parliament.

== Early life and background ==
He is the son of Inder Kumar Gujral, former Prime Minister of India and Sheila Gujral, a noted Hindi poet. He is the grandson of Indian politician Avtar Narain Gujral; his uncle Satish Gujral was a noted artist. He graduated from the Modern School in 1965, and completed his Bachelor's degree St. Stephen's College of the University of Delhi in 1968.

== Business career ==
He started a clothing company "SPAN", because he had “nothing better to do”, as he put it.

== Political career ==
He contested the 2004 elections for the Jalandhar Lok Sabha constituency as a Shiromani Akali Dal candidate and lost.

== Electoral History ==
=== Rajya Sabha ===
Position	Party	Constituency	From	To	Tenure
Member of Parliament, Rajya Sabha (1st Term)	SAD	Punjab	22 March 2007	9 April 2010	3 years, 18 days
Member of Parliament, Rajya Sabha (2nd Term)	SAD	Punjab	10 April 2010	9 April 2016	5 years, 365 days
Member of Parliament, Rajya Sabha (3rd Term)	SAD	Punjab	10 April 2016	9 April 2022	5 years, 364 days

== Personal life ==
He is married to Anjali Gujral and has two daughters.
