= 2021 Indian cabinet reshuffle =

Overview of the reshuffle of the Second Modi ministry

On 7 July 2021 Indian Prime Minister Narendra Modi carried out a reshuffle of his ministry. Modi carried out 3 cabinet reshuffles during his first ministry. The cabinet reshuffle of 2021 is the first cabinet reshuffle of the second Modi ministry.

== Changes ==
Jyotiraditya Scindia, Narayan Rane, Sarbananda Sonowal, Anupriya Patel, Kapil Patil, Meenakshi Lekhi, Ajay Bhatt, Bhupender Yadav, Darshana Jardosh, Pashupati Kumar Paras, Ramchandra Prasad Singh, Bharati Pawar, Ashwini Vaishnaw, Nisith Pramanik, Shobha Karandlaje, Pratima Bhoumik, L. Murugan, Ajay Kumar Mishra, Pankaj Chaudhary, Kaushal Kishore, Rajeev Chandrasekhar, Subhas Sarkar, Shantanu Thakur, Rajkumar Ranjan Singh, Bhanu Pratap Singh Verma, S. P. Singh Baghel, Annapurna Devi Yadav, B. L. Verma, Devusinh Chauhan, Bhagwanth Khuba, Mahendra Munjapara, John Barla, Bishweswar Tudu and A. Narayanaswamy became new ministers.

Harsh Vardhan, Prakash Javadekar, Ravi Shankar Prasad, Ramesh Pokhriyal Nishank, D. V. Sadananda Gowda, Santosh Gangwar, Sanjay Dhotre, Debasree Chaudhuri, Rattan Lal Kataria, Babul Supriyo, Thawarchand Gehlot and Pratap Sarangi left the Modi cabinet.

Anurag Thakur, G. Kishan Reddy, Kiren Rijiju, R. K. Singh, Hardeep Singh Puri, Mansukh L. Mandaviya and Parshottam Rupala were promoted to cabinet rank ministers.

== Cabinet-level changes ==
Colour key
- Joined the cabinet
- Promoted
- Left the cabinet

Minister	Position before reshuffle	Position after reshuffle
Amit Shah	Minister of Home Affairs	Minister of Home Affairs; Minister of Co-operation
Nitin Gadkari	Minister of Road Transport and Highways; Minister of Micro, Small and Medium Enterprises	Minister of Road Transport and Highways
D. V. Sadananda Gowda	Minister of Chemicals and Fertilizers	Resigned from the government
Narendra Singh Tomar	Minister of Agriculture and Farmers' Welfare; Minister of Rural Development; Minister of Panchayati Raj; Minister of Food Processing Industries	Minister of Agriculture and Farmers' Welfare
Ravi Shankar Prasad	Minister of Law and Justice; Minister of Communications; Minister of Electronics and Information Technology	Resigned from the government
Thawar Chand Gehlot	Minister of Social Justice and Empowerment; Leader of the House in Rajya Sabha	Resigned from the government (Note: Appointed as Governor of Karnataka in 11 July 2021.)
Ramesh Pokhriyal 'Nishank'	Minister of Education	Resigned from the government
Smriti Irani	Minister of Women and Child Development; Minister of Textiles	Minister of Women and Child Development
Harsh Vardhan	Minister of Health and Family Welfare; Minister of Science and Technology; Minister of Earth Sciences	Resigned from the government
Prakash Javadekar	Minister of Environment, Forest and Climate Change; Minister of Information and Broadcasting; Minister of Heavy Industries and Public Enterprises	Resigned from the government
Piyush Goyal	Minister of Railways; Minister of Commerce and Industry; Minister of Consumer Affairs, Food and Public Distribution	Minister of Commerce and Industry; Minister of Consumer Affairs, Food and Public Distribution; Minister of Textiles
Dharmendra Pradhan	Minister of Petroleum and Natural Gas; Minister of Steel	Minister of Education; Minister of Skill Development and Entrepreneurship
Narayan Rane	Rajya Sabha MP	Minister of Micro, Small and Medium Enterprises
Sarbananda Sonowal	None (Note: Formerly served as the Chief Minister of Assam until 10 May 2021)	Minister of Ports, Shipping and Waterways; Minister of AYUSH
Virendra Kumar Khatik	Lok Sabha MP	Minister of Social Justice and Empowerment
Mahendra Nath Pandey	Minister of Skill Development and Entrepreneurship	Minister of Heavy Industries
Giriraj Singh	Minister of Animal Husbandry, Dairying and Fisheries	Minister of Rural Development; Minister of Panchayati Raj
Jyotiraditya Scindia	Rajya Sabha MP	Minister of Civil Aviation
Ramchandra Prasad Singh	Rajya Sabha MP	Minister of Steel
Ashwini Vaishnaw	Rajya Sabha MP	Minister of Railways; Minister of Communications; Minister of Electronics and Information Technology
Pashupati Kumar Paras	Lok Sabha MP	Minister of Food Processing Industries
Kiren Rijiju	Minister of State (Independent Charge) for Youth Affairs and Sports; Minister of State for Minority Affairs	Minister of Law and Justice
Raj Kumar Singh	Minister of State (Independent Charge) for Power; Minister of State (Independent Charge) for New and Renewable Energy; Minister of State for Skill Development and Entrepreneurship	Minister of Power; Minister of New and Renewable Energy
Hardeep Singh Puri	Minister of State (Independent Charge) for Housing and Urban Affairs; Minister of State (Independent Charge) for Civil Aviation; Minister of State for Commerce and Industry	Minister of Housing and Urban Affairs; Minister of Petroleum and Natural Gas
Mansukh Mandaviya	Minister of State (Independent Charge) for Ports, Shipping and Waterways; Minister of State for Chemicals and Fertilizers	Minister of Health and Family Welfare; Minister of Chemicals and Fertilizers
Bhupender Yadav	Rajya Sabha MP	Minister of Environment, Forest and Climate Change; Minister of Labour and Employment
Parshottam Rupala	Minister of State for Agriculture and Farmers' Welfare	Minister of Fisheries, Animal Husbandry and Dairying
G. Kishan Reddy	Minister of State for Home Affairs	Minister of Culture; Minister of Tourism; Minister of Development of North Eastern Region
Anurag Singh Thakur	Minister of State for Finance; Minister of State for Corporate Affairs	Minister of Information and Broadcasting; Minister of Youth Affairs and Sports

== Ministers of State-level changes ==
Colour key
- Joined the cabinet
- Left the cabinet

Minister	Position before reshuffle	Position after reshuffle
Santosh Kumar Gangwar	Minister of State (Independent Charge) for Labour and Employment	Resigned from the government
Rao Inderjit Singh	Minister of State (Independent Charge) for Statistics and Programme Implementation; Minister of State (Independent Charge) for Planning	Minister of State (Independent Charge) for Statistics and Programme Implementation; Minister of State (Independent Charge) for Planning; Minister of State for Corporate Affairs
Shripad Yesso Naik	Minister of State (Independent Charge) for AYUSH; Minister of State for Defence	Minister of State for Ports, Shipping and Waterways; Minister of State for Tourism
Jitendra Singh	Minister of State (Independent Charge) for Development of North Eastern Region; Minister of State in the Prime Minister's Office; Minister of State for Personnel, Public Grievances and Pensions; Minister of State for Department of Space; Minister of State for Department of Atomic Energy	Minister of State (Independent Charge) for Science and Technology; Minister of State (Independent Charge) for Earth Sciences; Minister of State in the Prime Minister's Office; Minister of State for Personnel, Public Grievances and Pensions; Minister of State for Department of Space; Minister of State for Department of Atomic Energy
Prahlad Singh Patel	Minister of State (Independent Charge) for Culture; Minister of State (Independent Charge) for Tourism	Minister of State for Jal Shakti; Minister of State for Food Processing Industries
Faggan Singh Kulaste	Minister of State for Steel	Minister of State for Steel; Minister of State for Rural Development
Ashwini Kumar Choubey	Minister of State for Health and Family Welfare	Minister of State for Consumer Affairs, Food and Public Distribution; Minister of State for Environment, Forest and Climate Change
Arjun Ram Meghwal	Minister of State for Parliamentary Affairs; Minister of State for Heavy Industries and Public Enterprises	Minister of State for Parliamentary Affairs; Minister of State for Culture
General V. K. Singh	Minister of State for Road Transport and Highways	Minister of State for Road Transport and Highways; Minister of Civil Aviation
Krishan Pal Gurjar	Minister of State for Social Justice and Empowerment	Minister of State for Power; Minister of State for Heavy Industries
Raosaheb Danve	Minister of State for Consumer Affairs, Food and Public Distribution	Minister of State for Railways; Minister of State for Coal; Minister of State for Mines
Niranjan Jyoti	Minister of State for Rural Development	Minister of State for Consumer Affairs, Food and Public Distribution; Minister of State for Rural Development
Babul Supriyo	Minister of State for Environment, Forest and Climate Change	Resigned from the government
Sanjay Shamrao Dhotre	Minister of State for Education; Minister of State for Communications; Minister of State for Electronics and Information Technology	Resigned from the government
Rattan Lal Kataria	Minister of State for Jal Shakti; Minister of State for Social Justice and Empowerment	Resigned from the government
Rameswar Teli	Minister of State for Food Processing Industries	Minister of State for Petroleum and Natural Gas; Minister of State for Labour and Employment
Pratap Chandra Sarangi	Minister of State for Micro, Small and Medium Enterprises; Minister of State for Animal Husbandry, Dairying and Fisheries	Resigned from the government
Debasree Chaudhuri	Minister of State for Women and Child Development	Resigned from the government
Pankaj Chaudhary	Lok Sabha MP	Minister of State for Finance
Anupriya Singh Patel	Lok Sabha MP	Minister of State for Commerce and Industry
S. P. Singh Baghel	Lok Sabha MP	Minister of State for Law and Justice
Rajeev Chandrasekhar	Rajya Sabha MP	Minister of State for Skill Development and Entrepreneurship; Minister of State for Electronics and Information Technology
Shobha Karandlaje	Lok Sabha MP	Minister of State for Agriculture and Farmers' Welfare
Bhanu Pratap Singh Verma	Lok Sabha MP	Minister of State for Micro, Small and Medium Enterprises
Darshana Jardosh	Lok Sabha MP	Minister of State for Textiles; Minister of State for Railways
Meenakshi Lekhi	Lok Sabha MP	Minister of State for External Affairs; Minister of State for Culture
Annpurna Devi	Lok Sabha MP	Minister of State for Education
A. Narayanaswamy	Lok Sabha MP	Minister of State for Social Justice and Empowerment
Kaushal Kishore	Lok Sabha MP	Minister of State for Housing and Urban Affairs
Ajay Bhatt	Lok Sabha MP	Minister of State for Defence; Minister of State for Tourism
B. L. Verma	Rajya Sabha MP	Minister of State for Development of North Eastern Region; Minister of State for Co-operation
Ajay Mishra Teni	Lok Sabha MP	Minister of State for Home Affairs
Devusinh Chauhan	Lok Sabha MP	Minister of State for Communications
Bhagwanth Khuba	Lok Sabha MP	Minister of State for New and Renewable Energy; Minister of State for Chemicals and Fertilizers
Kapil Moreshwar Patil	Lok Sabha MP	Minister of State for Panchayati Raj
Pratima Bhoumik	Lok Sabha MP	Minister of State for Social Justice and Empowerment
Subhas Sarkar	Lok Sabha MP	Minister of State for Education
Bhagwat Karad	Rajya Sabha MP	Minister of State for Finance
Rajkumar Ranjan Singh	Lok Sabha MP	Minister of State for External Affairs; Minister of State for Education
Bharati Pawar	Lok Sabha MP	Minister of State for Health and Family Welfare
Bishweswar Tudu	Lok Sabha MP	Minister of State for Tribal Affairs; Minister of State for Jal Shakti
Shantanu Thakur	Lok Sabha MP	Minister of State for Ports, Shipping and Waterways
Mahendra Munjapara	Lok Sabha MP	Minister of State for Women and Child Development; Minister of State for AYUSH
John Barla	Lok Sabha MP	Minister of State for Minority Affairs
L. Murugan	None (Note: Formerly served as the State President of Tamil Nadu Bharatiya Janata Party.)	Minister of State for Fisheries, Animal Husbandry and Dairying; Minister of State for Information and Broadcasting
Nisith Pramanik	Lok Sabha MP	Minister of State for Home Affairs; Minister of State for Youth Affairs and Sports

== Subsequent changes ==
=== 6 July 2022 ===
A minor reshuffle of the ministry took place on 6 July 2022. Both Mukhtar Abbas Naqvi and Ramchandra Prasad Singh, whose tenure as members of the Rajya Sabha had come to an end, resigned from the ministry. Smriti Irani was assigned the additional portfolio of Minority Affairs while Jyotiraditya Scindia was assigned the additional portfolio of Steel.

Minister	Position before reshuffle	Position after reshuffle
Smriti Irani	Minister of Women and Child Development	Minister of Women and Child Development; Minister of Minority Affairs
Mukhtar Abbas Naqvi	Minister of Minority Affairs	Resigned from the government
Jyotiraditya Scindia	Minister of Civil Aviation	Minister of Civil Aviation; Minister of Steel
Ramchandra Prasad Singh	Minister of Steel	Resigned from the government

=== 18 May 2023 ===
On 18 May 2023, Law and Justice Minister Kiren Rijiju was appointed as the Minister of Earth Sciences, while the portfolio of Law and Justice was assigned to Arjun Ram Meghwal.

Minister	Position before reshuffle	Position after reshuffle
Kiren Rijiju	Minister of Law and Justice	Minister of Earth Sciences
Arjun Ram Meghwal	Minister of State for Parliamentary Affairs; Minister of State for Culture	Minister of State (Independent Charge) for Law and Justice; Minister of State for Parliamentary Affairs; Minister of State for Culture
S. P. Singh Baghel	Minister of State for Law and Justice	Minister of State for Health and Family Welfare

=== 7 December 2023 ===
On 7 December 2023, Narendra Singh Tomar and Prahlad Singh Patel resigned from the ministry after being elected to the Madhya Pradesh Legislative Assembly, and Renuka Singh Saruta resigned after her election to the Chhattisgarh Legislative Assembly. Tribal Affairs Minister Arjun Munda was assigned the additional portfolio of Minister of Agriculture and Farmers' Welfare.

Minister	Position before reshuffle	Position after reshuffle
Narendra Singh Tomar	Minister of Agriculture and Farmers' Welfare	Resigned from the government
Arjun Munda	Minister of Tribal Affairs	Minister of Tribal Affairs; Minister of Agriculture and Farmers' Welfare
Prahlad Singh Patel	Minister of State for Jal Shakti; Minister of State for Food Processing Industries	Resigned from the government
Renuka Singh Saruta	Minister of State for Tribal Affairs	Resigned from the government
Shobha Karandlaje	Minister of State for Agriculture and Farmers' Welfare	Minister of State for Agriculture and Farmers' Welfare; Minister of State for Food Processing Industries
Rajeev Chandrasekhar	Minister of State for Skill Development and Entrepreneurship; Minister of State for Electronics and Information Technology	Minister of State for Skill Development and Entrepreneurship; Minister of State for Electronics and Information Technology; Minister of State for Jal Shakti
Bharati Pawar	Minister of State for Health and Family Welfare	Minister of State for Health and Family Welfare; Minister of State for Tribal Affairs

=== 19 March 2024 ===
Food Processing Industries Minister Pashupati Kumar Paras resigned from the ministry on 19 March 2024. Earth Sciences Minister Kiren Rijiju was assigned the additional portfolio.

Minister	Position before reshuffle	Position after reshuffle
Pashupati Kumar Paras	Minister of Food Processing Industries	Resigned from the cabinet
Kiren Rijiju	Minister of Earth Sciences	Minister of Earth Sciences; Minister of Food Processing Industries

== See also ==
- Premiership of Narendra Modi
- Second Modi ministry
