= Second Vajpayee ministry =

Indian union ministry, 1998–1999

Second Atal Bihari Vajpayee ministry
- 20th ministry of the Republic of India
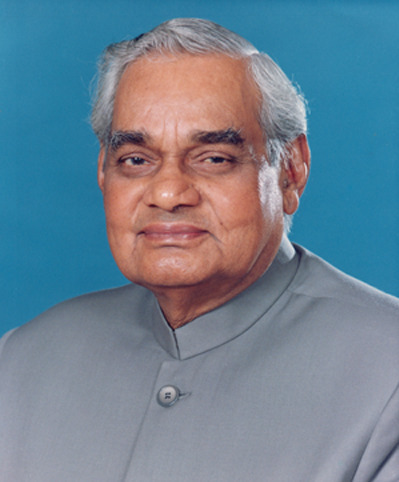
- Date formed: 19 March 1998
- Date dissolved: 12 October 1999

People and organisations
- Head of state: K. R. Narayanan
- Head of government: Atal Bihari Vajpayee
- Member party: Bharatiya Janata Party (NDA)
- Status in legislature: Coalition
- Opposition party: Indian National Congress
- Opposition leader: Sharad Pawar (19 March 1998 – 26 April 1999) (lok sabha)

History
- Election: 1998
- Outgoing election: 1999
- Legislature terms: 1 year, 207 days
- Predecessor: Gujral ministry
- Successor: Third Vajpayee ministry

Atal Bihari Vajpayee was sworn in as the Prime Minister of India for second time on 19 March 1998. The ministry resigned in 1999 after Vajpayee's government famously failed a confidence motion by a single vote. Here is the list of ministers in his ministry.

== Council of ministers ==
Representation of cabinet ministers by party
1. Bharatiya Janata Party (59.1%)
2. Independent (6.81%)
3. Samata Party (4.54%)
4. Shiromani Akali Dal (4.54%)
5. Lok Shakti (2.27%)
6. Pattali Makkal Katchi (2.27%)
7. Shiv Sena (2.27%)
8. All India Anna Dravida Munnetra Kazhagam (9.09%)
9. Tamizhaga Rajiv Congress (2.27%)
10. Arunachal Congress (2.27%)
11. Biju Janata Dal (4.54%)

=== Cabinet Ministers ===
Portfolio	Minister	Took office	Left office	Party	Remarks
Prime Minister; Minister of Personnel, Public Grievances and Pensions; Minister of Agriculture; Minister of Planning and Programme Implementation; Minister of Water Resources; Department of Atomic Energy; Department of Space; And also in-charge of all other important portfolios and policy issues not allocated to any Minister.	Atal Bihari Vajpayee	19 March 1998	13 October 1999	BJP	
Minister of Department of Jammu and Kashmir Affairs	Atal Bihari Vajpayee	19 March 1998	23 May 1998	BJP	Prime Minister was responsible.
Minister of Department of Jammu and Kashmir Affairs	L. K. Advani	23 May 1998	13 October 1999	BJP	
Minister of External Affairs	Atal Bihari Vajpayee	19 March 1998	5 December 1998	BJP	Prime Minister was responsible.
Minister of External Affairs	Jaswant Singh	5 December 1998	13 October 1999	BJP	
Minister of Non-Conventional Energy Sources	Atal Bihari Vajpayee	19 March 1998	3 February 1999	BJP	Prime Minister was responsible.
Minister of Non-Conventional Energy Sources	P. R. Kumaramangalam	3 February 1999	13 October 1999	BJP	
Minister of Food Processing Industries	Atal Bihari Vajpayee	19 March 1998	3 February 1999	BJP	Prime Minister was responsible.
Minister of Food Processing Industries	Pramod Mahajan	3 February 1999	13 October 1999	BJP	
Minister of Department of Electronics	Atal Bihari Vajpayee	19 March 1998	3 February 1999	BJP	Prime Minister was responsible.
Minister of Department of Electronics	Jaswant Singh	3 February 1999	13 October 1999	BJP	
Minister of Department of Ocean Development	Atal Bihari Vajpayee	19 March 1998	3 February 1999	BJP	Prime Minister was responsible.
Minister of Department of Ocean Development	Murli Manohar Joshi	3 February 1999	13 October 1999	BJP	
Minister of Home Affairs	L. K. Advani	19 March 1998	13 October 1999	BJP	
Minister of Civil Aviation	Ananth Kumar	19 March 1998	13 October 1999	BJP	
Minister of Industry	Sikander Bakht	19 March 1998	13 October 1999	BJP	
Minister of Chemicals and Fertilizers; Minister of Food and Consumer Affairs	Surjit Singh Barnala	19 March 1998	13 October 1999	SAD	
Minister of Defence	George Fernandes	19 March 1998	13 October 1999	SAP	
Minister of Commerce	Ramakrishna Hegde	19 March 1998	13 October 1999	Lok Shakti	
Minister of Labour	Satyanarayan Jatiya	19 March 1998	13 October 1999	BJP	
Minister of Urban Development	Ram Jethmalani	19 March 1998	8 June 1999	IND	
Minister of Urban Development	Jagmohan	8 June 1999	13 October 1999	BJP	
Minister of Human Resource Development; Minister of Science and Technology	Murli Manohar Joshi	19 March 1998	13 October 1999	BJP	
Minister of Petroleum and Natural Gas	Vazhappady K. Ramamurthy	19 March 1998	13 October 1999	TRC	
Minister of Parliamentary Affairs	Madan Lal Khurana	19 March 1998	30 January 1999	BJP	Resigned.
Minister of Parliamentary Affairs	P. R. Kumaramangalam	30 January 1999	13 October 1999	BJP	
Minister of Tourism	Madan Lal Khurana	19 March 1998	30 January 1999	BJP	Resigned.
Minister of Tourism	Ananth Kumar	30 January 1999	13 October 1999	BJP	
Minister of Power	P. R. Kumaramangalam	19 March 1998	13 October 1999	BJP	
Minister of Law, Justice and Company Affairs	M. Thambidurai	19 March 1998	8 April 1999	AIADMK	Resigned.
Minister of Law, Justice and Company Affairs	P. R. Kumaramangalam	9 April 1999	8 June 1999	BJP	
Minister of Law, Justice and Company Affairs	Ram Jethmalani	8 June 1999	13 October 1999	IND	
Minister of Railways	Nitish Kumar	19 March 1998	5 August 1999	SAP	Resigned.
Minister of Railways	Atal Bihari Vajpayee	5 August 1999	6 August 1999	BJP	Prime Minister was responsible.
Minister of Railways	Ram Naik	6 August 1999	13 October 1999	BJP	Minister of State (I/C) was responsible.
Minister of Steel; Minister of Mines	Naveen Patnaik	19 March 1998	13 October 1999	BJD	
Minister of Environment and Forests	Suresh Prabhu	19 March 1998	13 October 1999	SS	
Minister of Textiles	Kashiram Rana	19 March 1998	13 October 1999	BJP	
Minister of Surface Transport	R. Muthiah	19 March 1998	8 April 1998	AIADMK	Resigned.
Minister of Surface Transport	M. Thambidurai	8 April 1998	8 April 1999	AIADMK	Resigned.
Minister of Surface Transport	Nitish Kumar	9 April 1999	5 August 1999	SAP	Resigned.
Minister of Surface Transport	Jaswant Singh	5 August 1999	13 October 1999	BJP	
Minister of Finance	Yashwant Sinha	19 March 1998	13 October 1999	BJP	
Minister of Communications	Buta Singh	19 March 1998	20 April 1998	IND	Resigned.
Minister of Communications	Sushma Swaraj	20 April 1998	10 October 1998	BJP	Resigned.
Minister of Communications	Atal Bihari Vajpayee	10 October 1998	5 December 1998	BJP	Prime Minister was responsible.
Minister of Communications	Jagmohan	5 December 1998	8 June 1999	BJP	
Minister of Communications	Atal Bihari Vajpayee	8 June 1999	13 October 1999	BJP	Prime Minister was responsible.
Minister of Information and Broadcasting	Sushma Swaraj	19 March 1998	11 October 1998	BJP	Resigned.
Minister of Information and Broadcasting	Atal Bihari Vajpayee	11 October 1998	5 December 1998	BJP	Prime Minister was responsible.
Minister of Information and Broadcasting	Pramod Mahajan	5 December 1998	13 October 1999	BJP	
Minister of Health and Family Welfare	Dalit Ezhilmalai	20 March 1998	14 August 1999	PMK	Minister of State (I/C) was responsible.
Minister of Health and Family Welfare	Atal Bihari Vajpayee	14 August 1999	16 August 1999	BJP	Prime Minister was responsible.
Minister of Health and Family Welfare	A. K. Patel	16 August 1999	13 October 1999	BJP	Minister of State (I/C) was responsible.

=== Ministers of State (Independent Charge) ===
Portfolio	Minister	Took office	Left office	Party	Remarks
Minister of State (Independent Charge) of Welfare	Maneka Gandhi	19 March 1998	23 May 1998	IND	Renamed as Ministry of Social Justice and Empowerment.
Minister of State (Independent Charge) of Social Justice and Empowerment	Maneka Gandhi	23 May 1998	13 October 1999	IND	
Minister of State (Independent Charge) of Rural Development	Babagouda Patil	20 March 1998	13 October 1999	BJP	
Minister of State (Independent Charge) of Coal	Dilip Ray	20 March 1998	13 October 1999	BJD	
Minister of State (Independent Charge) of Department of Youth Affairs, Sports, Women and Child Development	Uma Bharti	1 March 1999	13 October 1999	BJP	

=== Ministers of State ===
Portfolio	Minister	Took office	Left office	Party	Remarks
Minister of State in the Ministry of Tourism	Omak Apang	20 March 1998	13 October 1999	AC	
Minister of State in the Ministry of Industry	Sukhbir Singh Badal	20 March 1998	13 October 1999	SAD	
Minister of State in the Ministry of Urban Development	Bandaru Dattatreya	20 March 1998	13 October 1999	BJP	
Minister of State in the Ministry of Steel; Minister of State in the Ministry of Mines	Ramesh Bais	19 March 1998	13 October 1999	BJP	
Minister of State in the Ministry of Human Resource Development	Uma Bharti	19 March 1998	13 October 1999	BJP	
Minister of State in the Ministry of Petroleum and Natural Gas	Santosh Kumar Gangwar	20 March 1998	13 October 1999	BJP	
Minister of State in the Ministry of Finance	R. K. Kumar	20 March 1998	22 May 1998	AIADMK	Resigned.
Minister of State in the Ministry of Finance	Kadambur R. Janarthanan	22 May 1998	8 April 1999	AIADMK	Resigned.
Minister of State in the Ministry of Parliamentary Affairs	R. K. Kumar	19 March 1998	22 May 1998	AIADMK	Resigned.
Minister of State in the Ministry of Parliamentary Affairs	Ram Naik	20 March 1998	5 May 1999	BJP	
Minister of State in the Ministry of Parliamentary Affairs	Dilip Ray	22 May 1999	13 October 1999	BJD	
Minister of State in the Ministry of Parliamentary Affairs	Santosh Kumar Gangwar	16 February 1999	13 October 1999	BJP	
Minister of State in the Ministry of Parliamentary Affairs	Mukhtar Abbas Naqvi	16 February 1999	13 October 1999	BJP	
Minister of State in the Ministry of Environment and Forests	Babulal Marandi	19 March 1998	13 October 1999	BJP	
Minister of State in the Ministry of Information and Broadcasting	Mukhtar Abbas Naqvi	20 March 1998	13 October 1999	BJP	
Minister of State in the Ministry of Railways	Ram Naik	19 March 1998	6 August 1999	BJP	
Minister of State in the Ministry of Chemicals and Fertilizers	A. K. Patel	19 March 1998	13 October 1999	BJP	
Minister of State in the Ministry of Surface Transport	Debendra Pradhan	19 March 1998	13 October 1999	BJP	
Minister of State in the Ministry of Communications	Kabindra Purkayastha	20 March 1998	13 October 1999	BJP	
Minister of State in the Ministry of External Affairs	Vasundhara Raje	20 March 1998	13 October 1999	BJP	
Minister of State in the Ministry of Agriculture	Sompal Shastri	19 March 1998	13 October 1999	BJP	
Minister of State in the Ministry of Food and Consumer Affairs	Satyapal Singh Yadav	19 March 1998	13 October 1999	BJP	
Minister of State in the Ministry of Personnel, Public Grievances and Pensions	Kadambur R. Janarthanan	20 March 1998	8 April 1999	AIADMK	Resigned.
Minister of State in the Ministry of Personnel, Public Grievances and Pensions	Vasundhara Raje	9 April 1999	13 October 1999	BJP	
Minister of State in the Ministry of Planning and Programme Implementation	Ram Naik	20 April 1998	13 October 1999	BJP	
Minister of State in the Ministry of Water Resources	Sompal Shastri	3 February 1999	13 October 1999	BJP	
Minister of State in the Ministry of Home Affairs	Ram Naik	5 May 1999	13 October 1999	BJP	
