= Gujral ministry =

Government of India, 1997–1998

Inder Kumar Gujral ministry
- 19th ministry of the Republic of India

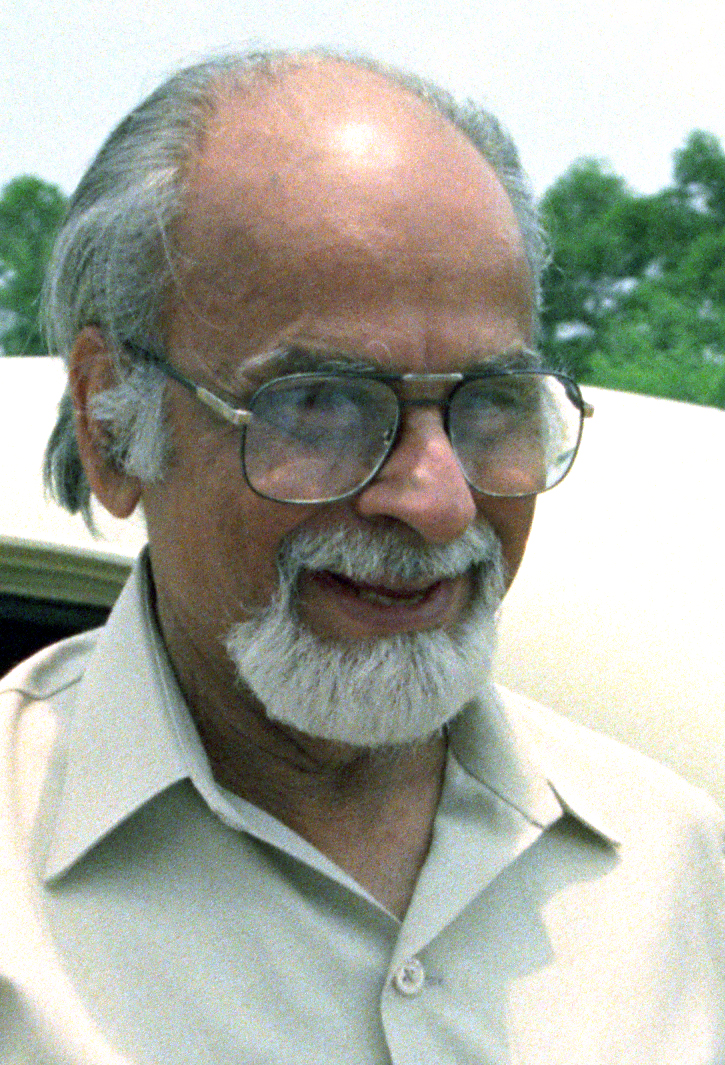
- Date formed: 21 April 1997
- Date dissolved: 19 March 1998

People and organisations
- Head of state: Shankar Dayal Sharma (until 25 July 1997); K. R. Narayanan (from 25 July 1997)
- Head of government: Inder Kumar Gujral
- Member party: Janata Dal (United Front) (supported by Indian National Congress 140/543 MPs)
- Status in legislature: Coalition
- Opposition party: Bharatiya Janata Party
- Opposition leader: Atal Bihari Vajpayee (until 4 December 1997) (lok sabha)

History
- Outgoing election: 1998
- Legislature terms: 10 months and 26 days
- Predecessor: Deve Gowda ministry
- Successor: Second Vajpayee ministry

Inder Kumar Gujral was sworn in as Prime Minister of India on 21 April 1997. In his initial ministry, the ministers were as follows.

== Council of ministers ==
Representation of cabinet ministers by party
1. Janata Dal (37.5%)
2. Independent (6.25%)
3. Communist Party of India (6.25%)
4. Jammu and Kashmir National Conference (3.13%)
5. Maharashtrawadi Gomantak Party (3.13%)
6. Telugu Desam Party (12.5%)
7. Dravida Munnetra Kazhagam (12.5%)
8. Tamil Maanila Congress (3.13%)
9. All India Indira Congress (Tiwari) (3.13%)
10. Asom Gana Parishad (6.25%)
11. Samajwadi Party (6.25%)

=== Cabinet ministers ===
The cabinet ministers in I. K. Gujral ministry were as follows.

Portfolio	Minister	Took office	Left office	Party	Ref
Prime Minister and also in-charge of: Ministry of External Affairs; Ministry of Personnel, Public Grievances and Pensions; Department of Atomic Energy; Department of Electronics; Department of Jammu and Kashmir Affairs; Department of Ocean Development; Department of Space; And all other important subjects not allocated to any Minister.	Inder Kumar Gujral	21 April 1997	19 March 1998	JD	
Minister of Welfare	Balwant Singh Ramoowalia	21 April 1997	19 March 1998	IND	
Minister of Communications	Beni Prasad Verma	21 April 1997	19 March 1998	SP	
Minister of Steel; Minister of Mines	Birendra Prasad Baishya	21 April 1997	19 March 1998	AGP	
Minister of Civil Aviation and Tourism	C. M. Ibrahim (Civil Aviation)	21 April 1997	19 March 1998	JD	
Minister of Civil Aviation and Tourism	Srikant Kumar Jena (Tourism)	21 April 1997	19 March 1998	JD	
Minister of Information and Broadcasting	C. M. Ibrahim	21 April 1997	1 May 1997	JD	
Minister of Information and Broadcasting	S. Jaipal Reddy	1 May 1997	19 March 1998	JD	
Minister of Agriculture	Chaturanan Mishra (excluding Animal Husbandry and Fisheries)	21 April 1997	9 July 1998	CPI	
Minister of Agriculture	Raghuvansh Prasad Singh (Animal Husbandry and Fisheries)	21 April 1997	9 July 1998	RJD	Minister of State (I/C) was responsible.
Minister of Agriculture	Chaturanan Mishra	9 July 1998	19 March 1998	CPI	
Minister of Home Affairs	Indrajit Gupta	21 April 1997	19 March 1998	CPI	
Minister of Water Resources	Janeshwar Mishra	21 April 1997	9 June 1997	SP	
Minister of Water Resources	Sis Ram Ola	9 June 1997	19 March 1998	AIIC(T)	Minister of State (I/C) was responsible.
Minister of Defence	Mulayam Singh Yadav	21 April 1997	19 March 1998	SP	
Minister of Industry	Murasoli Maran	21 April 1997	19 March 1998	DMK	
Minister of Environment and Forests	Saifuddin Soz	21 April 1997	19 March 1998	JKNC	
Minister of Textiles	R. L. Jalappa	21 April 1997	21 January 1998	JD	Resigned.
Minister of Textiles	Bolla Bulli Ramaiah	21 January 1998	19 March 1998	TDP	Minister of State (I/C) was responsible.
Minister of Railways	Ram Vilas Paswan	21 April 1997	19 March 1998	JD	
Minister of Human Resource Development	S. R. Bommai	21 April 1997	19 March 1998	JD	
Minister of Industry	Srikant Kumar Jena	21 April 1997	19 March 1998	JD	
Minister of Surface Transport	T. G. Venkatraman	21 April 1997	19 March 1998	DMK	
Minister of Rural Areas and Employment	Kinjarapu Yerran Naidu	21 April 1997	19 March 1998	TDP	
Minister of Food; Minister of Civil Supplies, Consumer Affairs and Public Distribution	Inder Kumar Gujral	21 April 1997	23 April 1997	JD	Prime Minister-in-charge.
Minister of Food; Minister of Civil Supplies, Consumer Affairs and Public Distribution	Chaturanan Mishra	24 April 1997	9 June 1997	CPI	Merged to form Ministry of Food and Consumer Affairs.
Minister of Food and Consumer Affairs	Raghuvansh Prasad Singh	9 June 1998	11 January 1998	RJD	Minister of State (I/C) was responsible.
Minister of Food and Consumer Affairs	Balwant Singh Ramoowalia	11 January 1998	19 March 1998	IND	
Minister of Finance	Inder Kumar Gujral	21 April 1997	1 May 1997	JD	Prime Minister-in-charge.
Minister of Finance	P. Chidambaram	1 May 1997	19 March 1998	TMC(M)	
Minister of Labour	Inder Kumar Gujral	21 April 1997	1 May 1997	JD	Prime Minister-in-charge.
Minister of Labour	M. Arunachalam	1 May 1997	9 June 1997	TMC(M)	
Minister of Labour	M. P. Veerendra Kumar	9 June 1997	19 March 1998	JD	Minister of State (I/C) was responsible.
Minister of Petroleum and Natural Gas	Inder Kumar Gujral	21 April 1997	9 June 1997	JD	Prime Minister-in-charge.
Minister of Petroleum and Natural Gas	Janeshwar Mishra	9 June 1997	19 March 1998	SP	
Minister of Power	Inder Kumar Gujral	21 April 1997	9 June 1997	JD	Prime Minister-in-charge.
Minister of Power	Yoginder K Alagh	9 June 1997	19 March 1998	IND	Minister of State (I/C) was responsible.
Minister of Urban Affairs and Employment	Inder Kumar Gujral	21 April 1997	9 June 1997	JD	Prime Minister-in-charge.
Minister of Urban Affairs and Employment	M. P. Veerendra Kumar	9 June 1997	2 July 1997	JD	Minister of State (I/C) was responsible.
Minister of Urban Affairs and Employment	Ummareddy Venkateswarlu	2 July 1997	14 November 1997	TDP	Minister of State (I/C) was responsible.
Minister of Urban Affairs and Employment	T. G. Venkatraman	14 November 1997	12 December 1997	DMK	Additional charge.
Minister of Urban Affairs and Employment	Ummareddy Venkateswarlu	12 December 1997	19 March 1998	TDP	Minister of State (I/C) was responsible.
Minister of Food Processing Industries	Dilip Ray	21 April 1997	25 December 1997	JD	Minister of State (I/C) was responsible. Resigned.
Minister of Food Processing Industries	S. Jaipal Reddy	25 December 1997	19 March 1998	JD	
Minister of Non-conventional Energy Sources	Jai Narain Prasad Nishad	21 April 1997	11 January 1998	JD	Minister of State (I/C) was responsible. Resigned.
Minister of Non-conventional Energy Sources	Inder Kumar Gujral	11 January 1998	19 March 1998	JD	Prime Minister-in-charge.
Minister of Coal	Kanti Singh	21 April 1997	11 January 1998	JD	Minister of State (I/C) was responsible. Resigned.
Minister of Coal	Inder Kumar Gujral	11 January 1998	19 March 1998	JD	Prime Minister-in-charge.
Minister of Health and Family Welfare	Saleem Iqbal Shervani	21 April 1997	9 June 1997	SP	Minister of State (I/C) was responsible.
Minister of Health and Family Welfare	Inder Kumar Gujral	9 June 1997	19 March 1998	JD	Prime Minister-in-charge.
Minister of Chemicals and Fertilizers	Sis Ram Ola	21 April 1997	9 June 1997	AIIC(T)	Minister of State (I/C) was responsible.
Minister of Chemicals and Fertilizers	M. Arunachalam	9 June 1997	19 March 1998	TMC(M)	
Minister of Planning and Programme Implementation	Yoginder K Alagh	21 April 1997	9 June 1997	IND	Minister of State (I/C) was responsible.
Minister of Planning and Programme Implementation	Inder Kumar Gujral	9 June 1997	19 March 1998	JD	Prime Minister-in-charge.

=== Ministers of State (Independent Charge) ===
Portfolio	Minister	Took office	Left office	Party
Minister of State (Independent Charge) of Commerce	Bolla Bulli Ramaiah	21 April 1997	19 March 1998	TDP
Minister of State (Independent Charge) of Law and Justice	Ramakant Khalap	21 April 1997	19 March 1998	MGP
Minister of State (Independent Charge) of Science and Technology	Yoginder K Alagh	21 April 1997	19 March 1998	IND

=== Ministers of State ===
Portfolio	Minister	Took office	Left office	Party	Remarks
Minister of State in the Ministry of Rural Areas and Employment	Chandradeo Prasad Verma	21 April 1997	20 June 1997	JD	Resigned.
Minister of State in the Ministry of Finance	M. P. Veerendra Kumar	21 April 1997	9 June 1997	JD	
Minister of State in the Ministry of Finance	Satpal Maharaj	9 June 1997	19 March 1998	AIIC(T)	
Minister of State in the Ministry of Human Resource Development	Muhi Ram Saikia (Education)	21 April 1997	19 March 1998	AGP	
Minister of State in the Ministry of Human Resource Development	R. Dhanuskodi Athithan (Youth Affairs and Sports)	1 May 1997	19 March 1998	TMC(M)	
Minister of State in the Ministry of Defence	N. V. N. Somu	21 April 1997	14 November 1997	DMK	Died in office.
Minister of State in the Ministry of Railways	Satpal Maharaj	21 April 1997	9 June 1997	AIIC(T)	
Minister of State in the Ministry of Power	Samudrala Venugopal Chary	21 April 1997	9 June 1997	TDP	
Minister of State in the Ministry of Petroleum and Natural Gas	T. R. Baalu	21 April 1997	19 March 1998	DMK	
Minister of State in the Ministry of Urban Affairs and Employment	Ummareddy Venkateswarlu	21 April 1997	9 June 1997	TDP	
Minister of State in the Ministry of Urban Affairs and Employment	M. P. Veerendra Kumar	26 May 1997	2 July 1997	JD	
Minister of State in the Ministry of Parliamentary Affairs	Ummareddy Venkateswarlu	21 April 1997	9 June 1997	TDP	
Minister of State in the Ministry of Parliamentary Affairs	S. R. Balasubramoniyan	1 May 1997	19 March 1998	TMC(M)	
Minister of State in the Ministry of Parliamentary Affairs	M. P. Veerendra Kumar	26 May 1997	2 July 1997	JD	
Minister of State in the Ministry of Parliamentary Affairs	Jayanthi Natarajan	9 June 1997	19 March 1998	TMC(M)	
Minister of State in the Ministry of Home Affairs	Maqbool Dar	1 May 1997	19 March 1998	JD	
Minister of State in the Ministry of Personnel, Public Grievances and Pensions	S. R. Balasubramoniyan	1 May 1997	19 March 1998	TMC(M)	
Minister of State in the Ministry of External Affairs	Saleem Iqbal Shervani	9 June 1997	19 March 1998	SP	
Minister of State in the Ministry of External Affairs	Kamla Sinha	9 June 1997	19 March 1998	JD	
Minister of State in the Ministry of Civil Aviation	Jayanthi Natarajan	9 June 1997	19 March 1998	TMC(M)	
Minister of State in the Ministry of Planning and Programme Implementation	Ratnamala Savanur	9 June 1997	19 March 1998	JD	
Minister of State in the Ministry of Health and Family Welfare	Renuka Chowdhury	9 June 1997	19 March 1998	TDP	
Minister of State in the Ministry of Agriculture	Samudrala Venugopal Chary	9 June 1997	19 March 1998	TDP	
Minister of State in the Ministry of Coal	Jayanthi Natarajan	11 January 1998	19 March 1998	TMC(M)	
Minister of State in the Ministry of Non-Conventional Energy Sources	T. R. Baalu	11 January 1998	19 March 1998	DMK	
