= First Vajpayee ministry =

Union Council of Ministers headed by Atal Bihari Vajpayee

First Atal Bihari Vajpayee ministry
- 17th ministry of the Republic of India

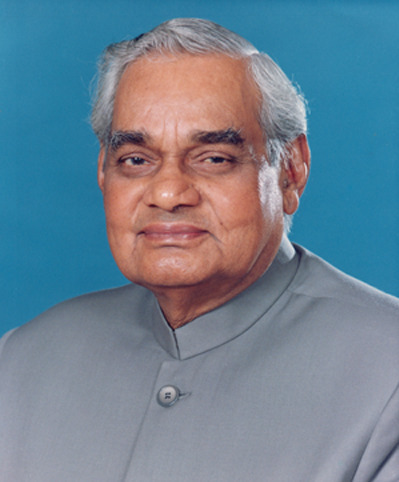
- Date formed: 16 May 1996
- Date dissolved: 1 June 1996

People and organisations
- Head of state: Shankar Dayal Sharma
- Head of government: Atal Bihari Vajpayee
- Member party: Bharatiya Janata Party
- Status in legislature: Minority
- Opposition party: Indian National Congress
- Opposition leader: P. V. Narasimha Rao (lok sabha)

History
- Election: 1996
- Legislature term: 16 days
- Predecessor: Rao ministry
- Successor: Deve Gowda ministry

Atal Bihari Vajpayee was sworn in as Prime Minister of India for first time on 16 May 1996.

BJP was well short of majority and looking for allies, but Vajpayee resigned after just 13 days since he could not muster enough support. The ministry was kept small because its fate was uncertain when swearing-in took place.

== List of ministers ==
Portfolio	Minister	Took office	Left office	Party
Prime Minister and also in-charge of: Ministry of Chemicals and Fertilizers; Ministry of Civil Supplies, Consumer Affairs and Public Distribution; Ministry of Coal; Ministry of Commerce; Ministry of Communications; Ministry of Environment and Forests; Ministry of Food; Ministry of Food Processing Industries; Ministry of Human Resource Development; Ministry of Labour; Ministry of Mines; Ministry of Non-Conventional Energy Sources; Ministry of Personnel, Public Grievances and Pensions; Ministry of Petroleum and Natural Gas; Ministry of Planning and Programme Implementation; Ministry of Power; Ministry of Railways; Ministry of Rural Areas and Employment; Ministry of Science and Technology; Ministry of Steel; Ministry of Surface Transport; Ministry of Textiles; Ministry of Water Resources; Department of Atomic Energy; Department of Electronics; Department of Jammu and Kashmir Affairs; Department of Ocean Development; Department of Space; And all other subjects not allocated to any other Cabinet Minister.	Atal Bihari Vajpayee	16 May 1996	28 May 1996	BJP
Minister of External Affairs	Atal Bihari Vajpayee	16 May 1996	21 May 1996	BJP
Minister of External Affairs	Sikander Bakht	21 May 1996	28 May 1996	BJP
Minister of Urban Affairs and Employment	Sikander Bakht	16 May 1996	28 May 1996	BJP
Minister of Agriculture	Suraj Bhan	16 May 1996	28 May 1996	BJP
Minister of Law, Justice and Company Affairs	Ram Jethmalani	16 May 1996	28 May 1996	BJP
Minister of Home Affairs	Murli Manohar Joshi	16 May 1996	28 May 1996	BJP
Minister of Civil Aviation and Tourism	V. Dhananjaya Kumar	16 May 1996	28 May 1996	BJP
Minister of Defence; Minister of Parliamentary Affairs	Pramod Mahajan	16 May 1996	28 May 1996	BJP
Minister of Welfare	Kariya Munda	16 May 1996	28 May 1996	BJP
Minister of Industry	Suresh Prabhu	16 May 1996	28 May 1996	SS
Minister of Health and Family Welfare	Sartaj Singh	16 May 1996	28 May 1996	BJP
Minister of Finance	Jaswant Singh	16 May 1996	28 May 1996	BJP
Minister of Information and Broadcasting	Sushma Swaraj	16 May 1996	28 May 1996	BJP
