= Deve Gowda ministry =

Union Council of Ministers headed by Deve Gowda

H. D. Deve Gowda ministry
- 18th ministry of the Republic of India

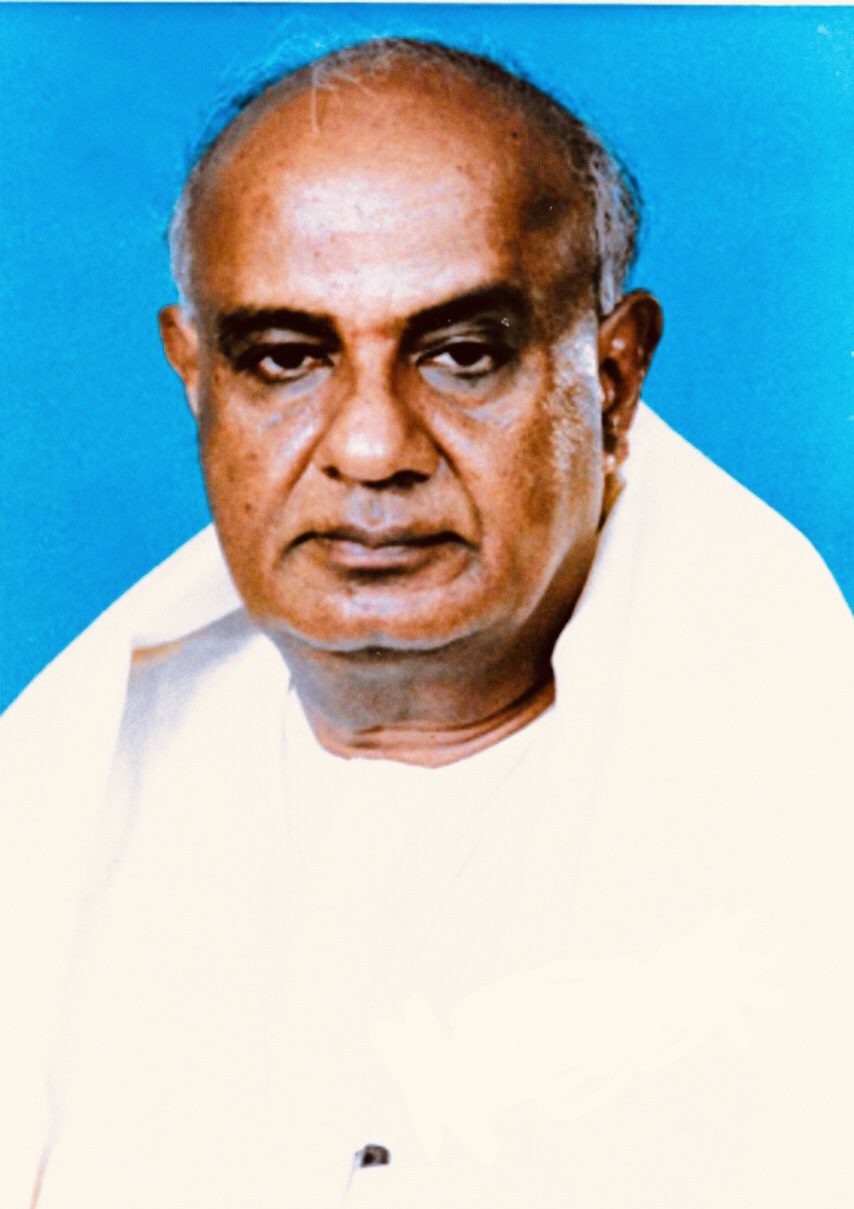
- Official portrait, c. 1996
- Date formed: 1 June 1996
- Date dissolved: 21 April 1997

People and organisations
- Head of state: Shankar Dayal Sharma
- Head of government: H. D. Deve Gowda
- Member party: Janata Dal (United Front) (supported by Indian National Congress 140/543 MPs)
- Status in legislature: Coalition
- Opposition leader: Atal Bihari Vajpayee (lok sabha) Sikander Bakht (Rajya Sabha)

History
- Legislature terms: 10 months and 20 days
- Predecessor: First Vajpayee ministry
- Successor: Gujral ministry

H. D. Deve Gowda was sworn in as Prime Minister of India on 1 June 1996. In his initial ministry the ministers were as follows.

== Council of ministers ==
=== Cabinet Ministers ===
Portfolio	Minister	Took office	Left office	Party	Remarks
Prime Minister and also in-charge of: Ministry of Personnel, Public Grievances and Pensions; Ministry of Petroleum and Natural Gas; Ministry of Power; Department of Atomic Energy; Department of Electronics; Department of Jammu and Kashmir Affairs; Department of Ocean Development; Department of Space; And all other subjects not allocated to any Minister.	H. D. Deve Gowda	1 June 1996	21 April 1997	JD	
Minister of Welfare	Balwant Singh Ramoowalia	1 June 1996	21 April 1997	IND	
Minister of Information and Broadcasting	C. M. Ibrahim	1 June 1996	21 April 1997	JD	
Minister of Civil Aviation and Tourism	C. M. Ibrahim	1 June 1996	29 June 1996	JD	
Minister of Civil Aviation and Tourism	C. M. Ibrahim (Civil Aviation)	29 June 1996	21 April 1997	JD	
Minister of Civil Aviation and Tourism	Srikant Kumar Jena (Tourism)	29 June 1996	21 April 1997	JD	
Minister of Food; Minister of Civil Supplies, Consumer Affairs and Public Distribution	Devendra Prasad Yadav	1 June 1996	21 April 1997	JD	
Minister of External Affairs	Inder Kumar Gujral	1 June 1996	21 April 1997	JD	
Minister of Urban Affairs and Employment	M. Arunachalam	1 June 1996	29 June 1996	TMC(M)	
Minister of Urban Affairs and Employment	H. D. Deve Gowda	29 June 1996	21 April 1997	JD	Prime Minister was responsible.
Minister of Defence	Mulayam Singh Yadav	1 June 1996	21 April 1997	SP	
Minister of Industry	Murasoli Maran	1 June 1996	21 April 1997	DMK	
Minister of Finance	P. Chidambaram	1 June 1996	21 April 1997	TMC(M)	
Minister of Railways	Ram Vilas Paswan	1 June 1996	21 April 1997	JD	
Minister of Human Resource Development	S. R. Bommai	1 June 1996	21 April 1997	JD	
Minister of Surface Transport	T. G. Venkatraman	1 June 1996	21 April 1997	DMK	
Minister of Rural Areas and Employment	Kinjarapu Yerran Naidu	1 June 1996	21 April 1997	TDP	
Minister of Agriculture	H. D. Deve Gowda	1 June 1996	29 June 1996	JD	Prime Minister was responsible.
Minister of Agriculture	Chaturanan Mishra	29 June 1996	21 April 1997	CPI	
Minister of Agriculture	Dilip Ray (Animal Husbandry and Dairying)	29 June 1996	6 July 1996	JD	Minister of State (I/C) was responsible.
Minister of Agriculture	Raghuvansh Prasad Singh (Animal Husbandry and Dairying)	6 July 1996	21 April 1997	JD	Minister of State (I/C) was responsible.
Minister of Home Affairs	H. D. Deve Gowda	1 June 1996	29 June 1996	JD	Prime Minister was responsible.
Minister of Home Affairs	Indrajit Gupta	29 June 1996	21 April 1997	CPI	
Minister of Chemicals and Fertilizers	H. D. Deve Gowda	1 June 1996	29 June 1996	JD	Prime Minister was responsible.
Minister of Chemicals and Fertilizers	Sis Ram Ola	29 June 1996	21 April 1997	AIIC(T)	Minister of State (I/C) was responsible.
Minister of Communications	H. D. Deve Gowda	1 June 1996	29 June 1996	JD	Prime Minister was responsible.
Minister of Communications	Beni Prasad Verma	29 June 1996	10 July 1997	SP	Minister of State (I/C) was responsible.
Minister of Communications	Beni Prasad Verma	10 July 1997	19 March 1998	SP	
Minister of Environment and Forests	H. D. Deve Gowda	1 June 1996	29 June 1996	JD	Prime Minister was responsible.
Minister of Environment and Forests	Jai Narain Prasad Nishad	29 June 1996	21 February 1997	JD	Minister of State (I/C) was responsible.
Minister of Environment and Forests	Saifuddin Soz	21 February 1997	19 March 1998	JKNC	
Minister of Health and Family Welfare	H. D. Deve Gowda	1 June 1996	29 June 1996	JD	Prime Minister was responsible.
Minister of Health and Family Welfare	Saleem Iqbal Shervani	29 June 1996	21 April 1997	SP	Minister of State (I/C) was responsible.
Minister of Mines; Minister of Steel	H. D. Deve Gowda	1 June 1996	29 June 1996	JD	Prime Minister was responsible.
Minister of Mines; Minister of Steel	Birendra Prasad Baishya	29 June 1996	21 April 1997	AGP	
Minister of Science and Technology; Minister of Planning and Programme Implementation	H. D. Deve Gowda	1 June 1996	29 June 1996	JD	Prime Minister was responsible.
Minister of Science and Technology; Minister of Planning and Programme Implementation	Yoginder K Alagh	29 June 1996	21 April 1997	IND	Minister of State (I/C) was responsible.
Minister of Textiles	H. D. Deve Gowda	1 June 1996	29 June 1996	JD	Prime Minister was responsible.
Minister of Textiles	R. L. Jalappa	29 June 1996	10 July 1997	JD	Minister of State (I/C) was responsible.
Minister of Textiles	R. L. Jalappa	10 July 1997	19 March 1998	JD	
Minister of Labour	Balwant Singh Ramoowalia	1 June 1996	29 June 1996	IND	
Minister of Labour	M. Arunachalam	29 June 1996	21 April 1997	TMC(M)	
Minister of Commerce	Devendra Prasad Yadav	1 June 1996	29 June 1996	JD	
Minister of Commerce	Bolla Bulli Ramaiah	29 June 1996	21 April 1997	TDP	Minister of State (I/C) was responsible.
Minister of Water Resources	Inder Kumar Gujral	1 June 1996	29 June 1996	JD	
Minister of Water Resources	Janeshwar Mishra	29 June 1996	21 April 1997	SP	
Minister of Law, Justice and Company Affairs	P. Chidambaram	1 June 1996	29 June 1996	TMC(M)	
Minister of Law, Justice and Company Affairs	P. Chidambaram (Company Affairs)	1 June 1996	29 June 1996	TMC(M)	
Minister of Law, Justice and Company Affairs	Ramakant Khalap (Law and Justice)	29 June 1996	26 July 1996	MGP	Minister of State (I/C) was responsible. Bifurcated into Ministry of Law and Justice and Department of Company Affairs.
Minister of Law and Justice	Ramakant Khalap	26 July 1996	21 April 1997	MGP	Minister of State (I/C) was responsible.
Minister of Parliamentary Affairs	Ram Vilas Paswan	1 June 1996	29 June 1996	JD	
Minister of Parliamentary Affairs	Srikant Kumar Jena	29 June 1996	21 April 1997	JD	
Minister of Coal	S. R. Bommai	1 June 1996	29 June 1996	JD	
Minister of Coal	Kanti Singh	29 June 1996	21 April 1997	JD	Minister of State (I/C) was responsible.
Minister of Food Processing Industries	H. D. Deve Gowda	1 June 1996	6 July 1996	JD	Prime Minister was responsible.
Minister of Food Processing Industries	Dilip Ray	6 July 1996	19 March 1998	JD	Minister of State (I/C) was responsible.
Minister of Non-Conventional Energy Sources	H. D. Deve Gowda	1 June 1996	21 February 1997	JD	Prime Minister was responsible.
Minister of Non-Conventional Energy Sources	Jai Narain Prasad Nishad	21 February 1997	19 March 1998	JD	Minister of State (I/C) was responsible.

=== Ministers of State ===
Portfolio	Minister	Took office	Left office	Party
Minister of State in the Ministry of Communications	Beni Prasad Verma	1 June 1996	29 June 1996	SP
Minister of State in the Ministry of Parliamentary Affairs	Beni Prasad Verma	1 June 1996	29 June 1996	SP
Minister of State in the Ministry of Parliamentary Affairs	Ummareddy Venkateswarlu	1 June 1996	21 April 1997	TDP
Minister of State in the Ministry of Parliamentary Affairs	S. R. Balasubramoniyan	29 June 1996	21 April 1997	TMC(M)
Minister of State in the Ministry of Rural Areas and Employment	Chandradeo Prasad Verma	1 June 1996	21 April 1997	JD
Minister of State in the Ministry of Environment and Forests	Jai Narain Prasad Nishad	1 June 1996	29 June 1996	JD
Minister of State in the Ministry of Human Resource Development	Kanti Singh	1 June 1996	29 June 1996	JD
Minister of State in the Ministry of Home Affairs	Mohammed Taslimuddin	1 June 1996	9 July 1996	JD
Minister of State in the Ministry of Home Affairs	Maqbool Dar	10 July 1996	21 April 1997	JD
Minister of State in the Ministry of Health and Family Welfare	Saleem Iqbal Shervani	1 June 1996	29 June 1996	SP
Minister of State in the Ministry of Agriculture	Ummareddy Venkateswarlu	1 June 1996	29 June 1996	TDP
Minister of State in the Ministry of Non-Conventional Energy Sources	Samudrala Venugopal Chary	29 June 1996	21 February 1997	TDP
Minister of State in the Ministry of Urban Affairs and Employment	Ummareddy Venkateswarlu	29 June 1996	21 April 1997	TDP
Minister of State in the Ministry of Personnel, Public Grievances and Pensions	S. R. Balasubramoniyan	29 June 1996	21 April 1997	TMC(M)
Minister of State in the Ministry of Human Resource Development	R. Dhanuskodi Athithan (Youth Affairs and Sports)	29 June 1996	21 April 1997	TMC(M)
Minister of State in the Ministry of Human Resource Development	Muhi Ram Saikia (Education)	29 June 1996	21 April 1997	AGP
Minister of State in the Ministry of Railways	Satpal Maharaj	6 July 1996	21 April 1997	AIIC(T)
Minister of State in the Ministry of Defence	N. V. N. Somu	6 July 1996	21 April 1997	DMK
Minister of State in the Ministry of Petroleum and Natural Gas	T. R. Baalu	6 July 1996	21 April 1997	DMK
Minister of State in the Ministry of Finance	M. P. Veerendra Kumar	21 February 1997	21 April 1997	JD
