= Ministry of Planning (India) =

Government ministry of India

- Branch of Government of India

Ministry overview
- Jurisdiction: Government of the Republic of India
- Annual budget: ₹339.65 crores (2018-19) including NITI Aayog
- Minister responsible: Narendra Modi, Prime Minister of India
- Deputy Minister responsible: Rao Inderjit Singh, Minister of State (Independent Charge)
- Parent Ministry: Government of India

The Ministry of Planning is a ministry of the Government of India, with the Prime Minister of India serving as its minister. The ministry's functions are carried out through the central agency, NITI Aayog.

== NITI Aayog ==
On 1 January 2015, a Cabinet resolution was passed to replace the Planning Commission with the newly constituted NITI Aayog. The Government of India announced the formation of NITI Aayog on 1 January 2015. The first meeting of NITI Aayog was chaired by Narendra Modi on 8 February 2015.

NITI Aayog's mandate is to assist both the central and state governments in India's development by promoting cooperative federalism and involving state governments in the economic policy-making process through a bottom-up approach. The Governing Council of NITI Aayog, chaired by the Prime Minister, includes the Chief Ministers of all states and the Lieutenant Governors of Union Territories. In addition, temporary members are selected from leading universities and research institutions. The Council also consists of a Vice Chairman, Chief Executive Officer, and five ex-officio members. The Vice Chairman of NITI Aayog holds a rank equivalent to that of a Cabinet Minister.

NITI Aayog primarily provides policy inputs to the highest decision-making bodies. Through its Development Monitoring and Evaluation division (DMEO), it monitors all national and state schemes to provide an annual review to the Prime Minister and Budget of India. It also provides its comments on all major schemes before being approved by the Finance Ministry.

The body's lateral entry is the largest in the country among government bodies with lateral hires account more than half of the core work force. The body's Young Professional program is being emulated by all central ministries and the Army.

== Cabinet Ministers ==
Key

- MoS (I/C) – Minister of State (Independent Charge)
- MoS – Minister of State

No.	Portrait	Minister (Birth-Death) Constituency	Term of office			Political party	Ministry	Prime Minister
No.	Portrait	Minister (Birth-Death) Constituency	From	To	Period	Political party	Ministry	Prime Minister
Minister of Planning
1		Gulzarilal Nanda (1898–1998); Unelected, until 1952; MP for Sabarkantha, from 1952	24 September 1951	13 May 1952	11 years, 362 days	Indian National Congress	Nehru I	Jawaharlal Nehru
1		Gulzarilal Nanda (1898–1998); Unelected, until 1952; MP for Sabarkantha, from 1952	13 May 1952	17 April 1957	11 years, 362 days	Indian National Congress	Nehru II	Jawaharlal Nehru
1		Gulzarilal Nanda (1898–1998); Unelected, until 1952; MP for Sabarkantha, from 1952	17 April 1957	10 April 1962	11 years, 362 days	Indian National Congress	Nehru III	Jawaharlal Nehru
1		Gulzarilal Nanda (1898–1998); Unelected, until 1952; MP for Sabarkantha, from 1952	10 April 1962	21 September 1963	11 years, 362 days	Indian National Congress	Nehru IV	Jawaharlal Nehru
2		Bali Ram Bhagat (1922–2011); MP for Arrah (MoS)	21 September 1963	27 May 1964	2 years, 125 days	Indian National Congress	Nehru IV	Jawaharlal Nehru
2		Bali Ram Bhagat (1922–2011); MP for Arrah (MoS)	27 May 1964	9 June 1964	2 years, 125 days	Indian National Congress	Nanda I	Gulzarilal Nanda
2		Bali Ram Bhagat (1922–2011); MP for Arrah (MoS)	9 June 1964	11 January 1966	2 years, 125 days	Indian National Congress	Shastri	Lal Bahadur Shastri
2		Bali Ram Bhagat (1922–2011); MP for Arrah (MoS)	11 January 1966	24 January 1966	2 years, 125 days	Indian National Congress	Nanda II	Gulzarilal Nanda
3		Asoka Mehta (1911–1984); Rajya Sabha MP for Maharashtra, until 1967; MP for Bhandara, from 1967	24 January 1966	13 March 1967	1 year, 224 days	Indian National Congress	Indira I	Indira Gandhi
3		Asoka Mehta (1911–1984); Rajya Sabha MP for Maharashtra, until 1967; MP for Bhandara, from 1967	13 March 1967	5 September 1967	1 year, 224 days	Indian National Congress	Indira II	Indira Gandhi
–		Indira Gandhi (1917–1984); MP for Raebareli (Prime Minister)	5 September 1967	18 March 1971	3 years, 231 days	Indian National Congress	Indira II	Indira Gandhi
–		Indira Gandhi (1917–1984); MP for Raebareli (Prime Minister)	18 March 1971	24 April 1971	3 years, 231 days	Indian National Congress (R)	Indira III	Indira Gandhi
4		Chidambaram Subramaniam (1910–2000); MP for Krishnagiri	24 April 1971	22 July 1972	1 year, 89 days	Indian National Congress (R)	Indira III	Indira Gandhi
5		Durga Prasad Dhar (1918–1975); MP for Jammu and Kashmir	23 July 1972	31 December 1974	2 years, 161 days	Indian National Congress (R)	Indira III	Indira Gandhi
–		Indira Gandhi (1917–1984); MP for Raebareli (Prime Minister)	2 January 1975	24 March 1977	2 years, 81 days	Indian National Congress (R)	Indira III	Indira Gandhi
–		Morarji Desai (1896–1995); MP for Surat (Prime Minister)	24 March 1977	28 July 1979	2 years, 126 days	Janata Party	Desai	Self
–		Charan Singh (1902–1987); MP for Baghpat (Prime Minister)	28 July 1979	14 January 1980	170 days	Janata Party (Secular)	Charan	Self
–		Indira Gandhi (1917–1984); MP for Medak (Prime Minister)	14 January 1980	8 June 1980	146 days	Indian National Congress (I)	Indira IV	Indira Gandhi
6		N. D. Tiwari (1925–2018); MP for Nainital	8 June 1980	8 September 1981	1 year, 92 days	Indian National Congress (I)	Indira IV	Indira Gandhi
7		Shankarrao Chavan (1920–2004); MP for Nanded	8 September 1981	19 July 1984	2 years, 315 days	Indian National Congress (I)	Indira IV	Indira Gandhi
8		Prakash Chandra Sethi (1919–1996); MP for Indore	19 July 1984	31 October 1984	104 days	Indian National Congress (I)	Indira IV	Indira Gandhi
9		P. V. Narasimha Rao (1921–2004); MP for Hanamkonda (until 1984); MP for Ramtek (from 1984)	4 November 1984	31 December 1984	71 days	Indian National Congress (I)	Rajiv I	Rajiv Gandhi
9		P. V. Narasimha Rao (1921–2004); MP for Hanamkonda (until 1984); MP for Ramtek (from 1984)	31 December 1984	14 January 1985	71 days	Indian National Congress (I)	Rajiv II	Rajiv Gandhi
–		Rajiv Gandhi (1944–1991); MP for Amethi (Prime Minister)	14 January 1985	25 July 1987	2 years, 192 days	Indian National Congress (I)	Rajiv II	Rajiv Gandhi
10		P. Shiv Shankar (1929–2017); Rajya Sabha MP for Gujarat	25 July 1987	25 June 1988	336 days	Indian National Congress (I)	Rajiv II	Rajiv Gandhi
11		Madhavsinh Solanki (1927–2021); Rajya Sabha MP for Gujarat	25 June 1988	2 December 1989	1 year, 160 days	Indian National Congress (I)	Rajiv II	Rajiv Gandhi
–		Vishwanath Pratap Singh (1931–2008); MP for Fatehpur (Prime Minister)	2 December 1989	10 November 1990	343 days	Janata Dal	Vishwanath	Self
–		Chandra Shekhar (1927–2007); MP for Ballia (Prime Minister)	10 November 1990	21 June 1991	223 days	Samajwadi Janata Party (Rashtriya)	Chandra Shekhar	Chandra Shekhar
Minister of Planning and Programme Implementation
12		H. R. Bhardwaj (1939–2020); Rajya Sabha MP for Madhya Pradesh (MoS, I/C)	21 June 1991	2 July 1992	1 year, 11 days	Indian National Congress (I)	Rao	P. V. Narasimha Rao
13		Sukh Ram (1927–2022); MP for Mandi (MoS, I/C)	2 July 1992	18 January 1993	200 days	Indian National Congress (I)	Rao	P. V. Narasimha Rao
14		Giridhar Gamang (born 1943); MP for Koraput (MoS, I/C)	18 January 1993	15 September 1995	2 years, 240 days	Indian National Congress (I)	Rao	P. V. Narasimha Rao
15		Balram Singh Yadav (1939–2005); Rajya Sabha MP for Uttar Pradesh (MoS, I/C)	15 September 1995	16 May 1996	244 days	Indian National Congress (I)	Rao	P. V. Narasimha Rao
–		Atal Bihari Vajpayee (1924–2018); MP for Lucknow (Prime Minister)	16 May 1996	1 June 1996	16 days	Bharatiya Janata Party	Vajpayee I	Self
–		H. D. Deve Gowda (born 1933); Unelected (Prime Minister)	1 June 1996	29 June 1996	28 days	Janata Dal	Deve Gowda	H. D. Deve Gowda
16		Yoginder K Alagh (1939–2022); Rajya Sabha MP for Gujarat (MoS, I/C)	29 June 1996	21 April 1997	345 days	Janata Dal	Deve Gowda	H. D. Deve Gowda
16		Yoginder K Alagh (1939–2022); Rajya Sabha MP for Gujarat (MoS, I/C)	21 April 1997	9 June 1997	345 days	Janata Dal	Gujral	Inder Kumar Gujral
–		Inder Kumar Gujral (1919–2012); Rajya Sabha MP for Bihar (Prime Minister)	9 June 1997	19 March 1998	283 days	Janata Dal	Gujral	Inder Kumar Gujral
–		Atal Bihari Vajpayee (1924–2018); MP for Lucknow (Prime Minister)	19 March 1998	13 October 1999	1 year, 208 days	Bharatiya Janata Party	Vajpayee II	Self
Minister of Planning
–		Atal Bihari Vajpayee (1924–2018); MP for Lucknow (Prime Minister)	13 October 1999	22 May 2004	4 years, 222 days	Bharatiya Janata Party	Vajpayee III	Self
–		Manmohan Singh (born 1932); Rajya Sabha MP for Assam (Prime Minister)	22 May 2004	26 May 2014	10 years, 4 days	Indian National Congress	Manmohan I	Self
–		Manmohan Singh (born 1932); Rajya Sabha MP for Assam (Prime Minister)	22 May 2004	26 May 2014	10 years, 4 days	Indian National Congress	Manmohan II	Self
17		Rao Inderjit Singh (born 1951); MP for Gurgaon (MoS, I/C)	26 May 2014	Incumbent	12 years, 75 days	Bharatiya Janata Party	Modi I	Narendra Modi
17		Rao Inderjit Singh (born 1951); MP for Gurgaon (MoS, I/C)	26 May 2014	Incumbent	12 years, 75 days	Bharatiya Janata Party	Modi II	Narendra Modi
17		Rao Inderjit Singh (born 1951); MP for Gurgaon (MoS, I/C)	26 May 2014	Incumbent	12 years, 75 days	Bharatiya Janata Party	Modi III	Narendra Modi

== Ministers of State ==
No.	Portrait	Minister (Birth-Death) Constituency	Term of office			Political party	Ministry	Prime Minister
No.	Portrait	Minister (Birth-Death) Constituency	From	To	Period	Political party	Ministry	Prime Minister
Minister of State for Planning
1		Kotha Raghuramaiah (1912–1979); MP for Guntur	18 March 1967	5 September 1967	171 days	Indian National Congress	Indira II	Indira Gandhi
2		Mohan Dharia (1925–2013); MP for Pune	2 May 1971	10 October 1974	3 years, 161 days	Indian National Congress (R)	Indira III	Indira Gandhi
3		Vidya Charan Shukla (1929–2013); MP for Raipur	10 October 1974	28 June 1975	261 days	Indian National Congress (R)	Indira III	Indira Gandhi
4		Inder Kumar Gujral (1919–2012); Rajya Sabha MP for Punjab	28 June 1975	12 May 1976	319 days	Indian National Congress (R)	Indira III	Indira Gandhi
5		Sankar Ghose; Rajya Sabha MP for West Bengal	21 April 1976	24 March 1977	337 days	Indian National Congress (R)	Indira III	Indira Gandhi
6		Fazlur Rahman; MP for Bettiah	26 January 1979	15 July 1979	170 days	Janata Party	Desai	Morarji Desai
7		Harinath Mishra; MP for Darbhanga	4 November 1984	31 December 1984	57 days	Indian National Congress (I)	Rajiv I	Rajiv Gandhi
8		K. R. Narayanan (1921–2005); MP for Ottapalam	31 December 1984	25 September 1985	268 days	Indian National Congress (I)	Rajiv II	Rajiv Gandhi
9		Ajit Kumar Panja (1936–2008); MP for Calcutta North East	25 September 1985	22 October 1986	1 year, 27 days	Indian National Congress (I)	Rajiv II	Rajiv Gandhi
10		Sukh Ram (1927–2022); MP for Mandi	22 October 1986	14 February 1988	1 year, 115 days	Indian National Congress (I)	Rajiv II	Rajiv Gandhi
11		Biren Sing Engti (born 1945); MP for Autonomous District	14 February 1988	2 December 1989	1 year, 291 days	Indian National Congress (I)	Rajiv II	Rajiv Gandhi
12		Bhagey Gobardhan (1934–1993); MP for Mayurbhanj	23 April 1990	10 November 1990	201 days	Janata Dal	Vishwanath	Vishwanath Pratap Singh
Minister of State for Planning and Programme Implementation
13		Ratnamala Savanur (born 1950); MP for Chikkodi	9 June 1997	19 March 1998	283 days	Janata Dal	Gujral	Inder Kumar Gujral
14		Ram Naik (born 1934); MP for Mumbai North	20 April 1998	13 October 1999	1 year, 176 days	Bharatiya Janata Party	Vajpayee II	Atal Bihari Vajpayee
Minister of State for Planning
15		Bangaru Laxman (1939–2014); Rajya Sabha MP for Gujarat	13 October 1999	22 November 1999	40 days	Bharatiya Janata Party	Vajpayee III	Atal Bihari Vajpayee
16		Arun Shourie (born 1941); Rajya Sabha MP for Uttar Pradesh	22 November 1999	24 July 2000	245 days	Bharatiya Janata Party	Vajpayee III	Atal Bihari Vajpayee
(16)		Arun Shourie (born 1941); Rajya Sabha MP for Uttar Pradesh	7 November 2000	1 September 2001	298 days	Bharatiya Janata Party	Vajpayee III	Atal Bihari Vajpayee
17		Vijay Goel (born 1954); MP for Chandni Chowk	1 September 2001	2 November 2001	62 days	Bharatiya Janata Party	Vajpayee III	Atal Bihari Vajpayee
18		Vasundhara Raje (born 1953); MP for Jhalawar	2 November 2001	29 January 2003	1 year, 88 days	Bharatiya Janata Party	Vajpayee III	Atal Bihari Vajpayee
19		Satyabrata Mookherjee (1932–2023); MP for Krishnanagar	29 January 2003	22 May 2004	1 year, 114 days	Bharatiya Janata Party	Vajpayee III	Atal Bihari Vajpayee
20		M. V. Rajasekharan (1928–2020); Rajya Sabha MP for Karnataka	23 May 2004	6 April 2008	3 years, 319 days	Indian National Congress	Manmohan I	Manmohan Singh
21		V. Narayanasamy (born 1947); MP for Puducherry	6 April 2008	22 May 2009	1 year, 46 days	Indian National Congress	Manmohan I	Manmohan Singh
21		V. Narayanasamy (born 1947); MP for Puducherry	28 May 2009	19 January 2011	1 year, 236 days	Indian National Congress	Manmohan II	Manmohan Singh
22		Ashwani Kumar (born 1952); Rajya Sabha MP for Punjab	19 January 2011	28 October 2012	1 year, 283 days	Indian National Congress	Manmohan II	Manmohan Singh
23		Rajeev Shukla (born 1959); Rajya Sabha MP for Maharashtra	28 October 2012	26 May 2014	1 year, 210 days	Indian National Congress	Manmohan II	Manmohan Singh

== Deputy Ministers ==
No.	Portrait	Minister (Birth-Death) Constituency	Term of office			Political party	Ministry	Prime Minister
No.	Portrait	Minister (Birth-Death) Constituency	From	To	Period	Political party	Ministry	Prime Minister
Deputy Minister of Planning
1		Shyam Nandan Prasad Mishra (1920–2004); MP for Darbhanga North	10 September 1954	17 April 1957	7 years, 212 days	Indian National Congress	Nehru II	Jawaharlal Nehru
1		Shyam Nandan Prasad Mishra (1920–2004); MP for Darbhanga North	17 April 1957	10 April 1962	7 years, 212 days	Indian National Congress	Nehru III	Jawaharlal Nehru
2		Lalit Narayan Mishra (1923–1975); MP for Darbhanga	22 August 1960	10 April 1962	1 year, 231 days	Indian National Congress	Nehru III	Jawaharlal Nehru
3		C. R. Pattabhiraman (1906–2001); MP for Kumbakonam	8 May 1962	27 May 1964	2 years, 32 days	Indian National Congress	Nehru IV	Jawaharlal Nehru
3		C. R. Pattabhiraman (1906–2001); MP for Kumbakonam	27 May 1964	9 June 1964	2 years, 32 days	Indian National Congress	Nanda I	Gulzarilal Nanda
4		Dajisaheb Chavan (1916–1973); MP for Karad	24 January 1966	14 February 1966	21 days	Indian National Congress	Indira I	Indira Gandhi
