= Ministry of Coal =

Government ministry of India

- Ministry of Coal

Agency overview
- Formed: 1973; 53 years ago
- Jurisdiction: Government of India
- Headquarters: Ministry of Coal, Shastri Bhawan, Dr. Rajendra Prasad Road, New Delhi, India.
- Annual budget: ₹4,390 crore (US$460 million) (2026-27 est.)
- Ministers responsible: G. Kishan Reddy, Cabinet Minister; Satish Chandra Dubey, Minister of State
- Agency executive: Vikram Dev Dutt, IAS, Secretary
- Website: Official website

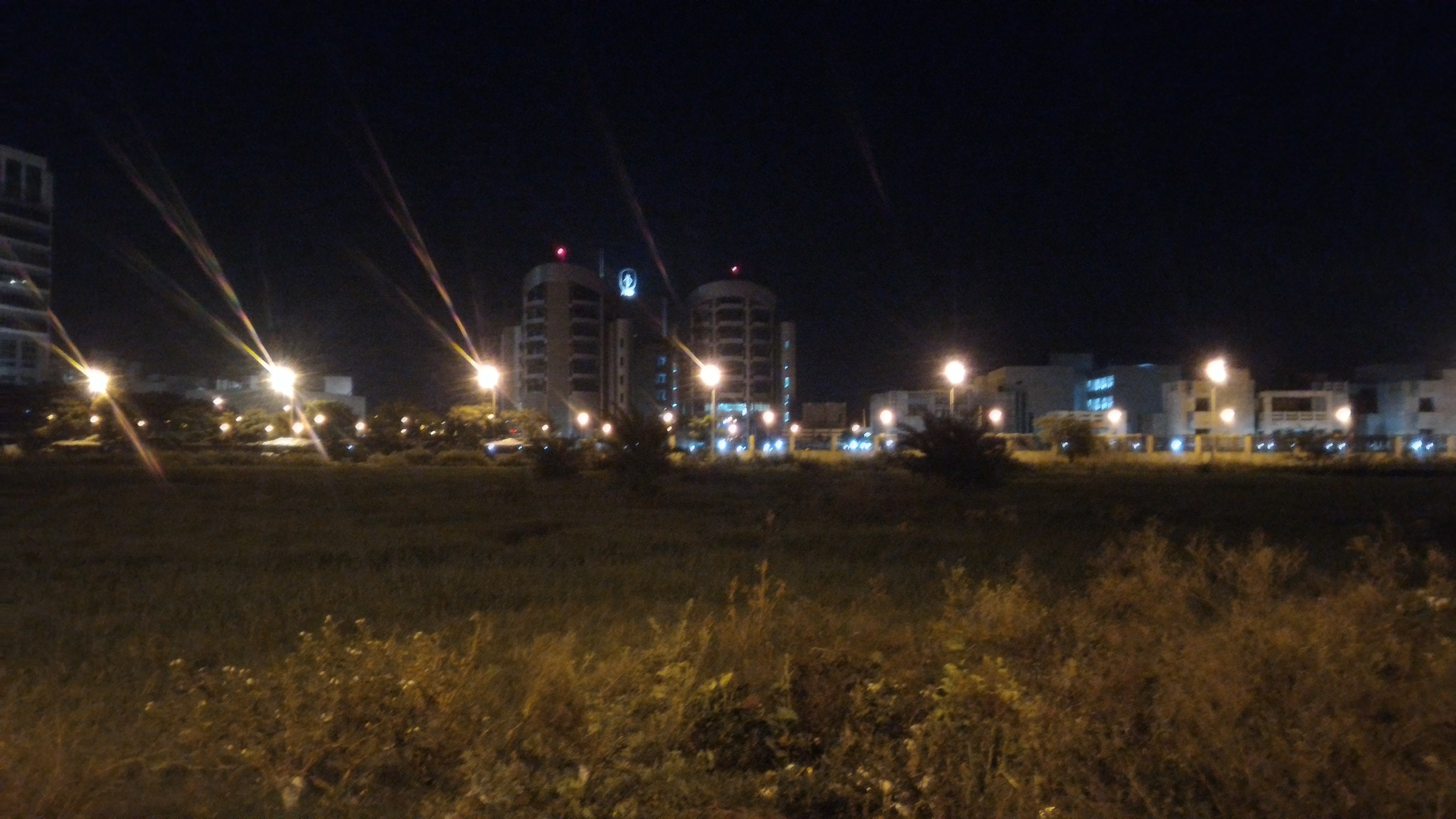
Coal India Bhawan, New Town, Rajarhat, Kolkata at the night as viewed from the background.

The Ministry of Coal is an Indian government ministry headquartered in New Delhi. The portfolio is held by Cabinet Minister G. Kishan Reddy.

The Ministry of Coal is charged with exploration of coal and lignite reserves in India, production, supply, distribution and price of coal through the government-owned corporation Coal India Limited and its subsidiaries, and Neyveli Lignite Corporation.

The Ministry of Coal also manages the Union Government's 49 percent equity participation in Singareni Collieries Company, a public sector undertaking that is a joint venture with the Government of Telangana. in which equity is held partly by the State Government of Telangana (51%) and the Government of India.

== Cabinet Ministers ==
Portrait	Minister (Birth-Death) Constituency	Term of office			Political party	Ministry	Prime Minister
Portrait	Minister (Birth-Death) Constituency	From	To	Period	Political party	Ministry	Prime Minister
Minister of Coal
	A. B. A. Ghani Khan Choudhury (1927–2006); MP for Malda	16 January 1980	15 January 1982	1 year, 364 days	Indian National Congress	Indira IV	Indira Gandhi
	N. D. Tiwari (1925–2018); MP for Nainital	2 September 1982	6 September 1982	4 days	Indian National Congress	Indira IV	Indira Gandhi
Merged into the Ministry of Energy during this interval.
	P. A. Sangma (1947–2016); MP for Tura (Minister of State, I/C)	21 June 1991	18 January 1993	1 year, 211 days	Indian National Congress	Rao	P. V. Narasimha Rao
	Ajit Kumar Panja (1936–2008); MP for Calcutta North East (Minister of State, I/C)	18 January 1993	13 September 1995	2 years, 238 days	Indian National Congress	Rao	P. V. Narasimha Rao
	Jagdish Tytler (born 1944); MP for Delhi Sadar (Minister of State, I/C)	15 September 1995	16 May 1996	244 days	Indian National Congress	Rao	P. V. Narasimha Rao
	Atal Bihari Vajpayee (1924–2018); MP for Lucknow (Prime Minister)	16 May 1996	1 June 1996	16 days	Bharatiya Janata Party	Vajpayee I	Atal Bihari Vajpayee
	S. R. Bommai (1927–2007); Rajya Sabha MP for Odisha	1 June 1996	29 June 1996	28 days	Janata Dal	Deve Gowda	H. D. Deve Gowda
	Kanti Singh (born 1957); MP for Bikramganj (Minister of State, I/C)	29 June 1996	21 April 1997	1 year, 195 days	Janata Dal	Deve Gowda	H. D. Deve Gowda
	Kanti Singh (born 1957); MP for Bikramganj (Minister of State, I/C)	21 April 1997	10 January 1998	1 year, 195 days	Janata Dal	Gujral	Inder Kumar Gujral
	Inder Kumar Gujral (1919–2012); Rajya Sabha MP for Bihar (Prime Minister)	10 January 1998	19 March 1998	68 days	Janata Dal	Gujral	Inder Kumar Gujral
	Dilip Ray (born 1954); Rajya Sabha MP for Odisha (Minister of State, I/C)	20 March 1998	13 October 1999	1 year, 207 days	Biju Janata Dal	Vajpayee II	Atal Bihari Vajpayee
Merged into the Ministry of Mines and Minerals during this interval.
	N. T. Shanmugam (born 1947); MP for Vellore (Minister of State, I/C)	27 May 2000	7 February 2001	256 days	Pattali Makkal Katchi	Vajpayee III	Atal Bihari Vajpayee
	Syed Shahnawaz Hussain (born 1968); MP for Kishanganj (Minister of State, I/C)	8 February 2001	1 September 2001	205 days	Bharatiya Janata Party	Vajpayee III	Atal Bihari Vajpayee
Minister of Coal and Mines
	Ram Vilas Paswan (1946–2020); MP for Hajipur	1 September 2001	29 April 2002	240 days	Lok Janshakti Party	Vajpayee III	Atal Bihari Vajpayee
	Atal Bihari Vajpayee (1924–2018); MP for Lucknow (Prime Minister)	29 April 2002	1 July 2002	63 days	Bharatiya Janata Party	Vajpayee III	Atal Bihari Vajpayee
	L. K. Advani (born 1927); MP for Gandhinagar (Deputy Prime Minister)	1 July 2002	26 August 2002	56 days	Bharatiya Janata Party	Vajpayee III	Atal Bihari Vajpayee
	Uma Bharti (born 1959); MP for Bhopal	26 August 2002	29 January 2003	156 days	Bharatiya Janata Party	Vajpayee III	Atal Bihari Vajpayee
Minister of Coal
	Kariya Munda (born 1936); MP for Khunti	29 January 2003	9 January 2004	345 days	Bharatiya Janata Party	Vajpayee III	Atal Bihari Vajpayee
Minister of Coal and Mines
	Mamata Banerjee (born 1955); MP for Calcutta South	9 January 2004	22 May 2004	134 days	Trinamool Congress	Vajpayee III	Atal Bihari Vajpayee
	Shibu Soren (1944–2025); MP for Dumka	23 May 2004	24 July 2004	62 days	Jharkhand Mukti Morcha	Manmohan I	Manmohan Singh
	Manmohan Singh (1932–2024); Rajya Sabha MP for Assam (Prime Minister)	24 July 2004	27 November 2004	126 days	Indian National Congress	Manmohan I	Manmohan Singh
Minister of Coal
	Shibu Soren (1944–2025); MP for Dumka	27 November 2004	2 March 2005	95 days	Jharkhand Mukti Morcha	Manmohan I	Manmohan Singh
	Manmohan Singh (1932–2024); Rajya Sabha MP for Assam (Prime Minister)	2 March 2005	29 January 2006	333 days	Indian National Congress	Manmohan I	Manmohan Singh
	Shibu Soren (1944–2025); MP for Dumka	29 January 2006	29 November 2006	304 days	Jharkhand Mukti Morcha	Manmohan I	Manmohan Singh
	Manmohan Singh (1932–2024); Rajya Sabha MP for Assam (Prime Minister)	29 November 2006	22 May 2009	2 years, 174 days	Indian National Congress	Manmohan I	Manmohan Singh
	Sriprakash Jaiswal (1944–2025); MP for Kanpur (Minister of State, I/C until 19 January 2011)	28 May 2009	26 May 2014	4 years, 363 days	Indian National Congress	Manmohan II	Manmohan Singh
	Piyush Goyal (born 1964); Rajya Sabha MP for Maharashtra (Minister of State, I/C until 3 September 2017)	27 May 2014	30 May 2019	5 years, 3 days	Bharatiya Janata Party	Modi I	Narendra Modi
	Pralhad Joshi (born 1962); MP for Dharwad	31 May 2019	9 June 2024	5 years, 9 days	Bharatiya Janata Party	Modi II	Narendra Modi
	G. Kishan Reddy (born 1964); MP for Secunderabad	10 June 2024	Incumbent	2 years, 59 days	Bharatiya Janata Party	Modi III	Narendra Modi

== Ministers of State ==
Portrait	Minister (Birth-Death) Constituency	Term of office			Political party	Ministry	Prime Minister
Portrait	Minister (Birth-Death) Constituency	From	To	Period	Political party	Ministry	Prime Minister
Minister of State for Coal
	Jayanthi Natarajan (born 1954); Rajya Sabha MP for Tamil Nadu	10 January 1998	19 March 1998	68 days	Tamil Maanila Congress (Moopanar)	Gujral	Inder Kumar Gujral
Minister of State for Coal and Mines
	Ravi Shankar Prasad (born 1954); Rajya Sabha MP for Bihar	1 September 2001	29 January 2003	1 year, 150 days	Bharatiya Janata Party	Vajpayee III	Atal Bihari Vajpayee
Minister of State for Coal
	Prahlad Singh Patel (born 1960); MP for Balaghat	24 May 2003	9 January 2004	230 days	Bharatiya Janata Party	Vajpayee III	Atal Bihari Vajpayee
Minister of State for Coal and Mines
	Prahlad Singh Patel (born 1960); MP for Balaghat	9 January 2004	22 May 2004	134 days	Bharatiya Janata Party	Vajpayee III	Atal Bihari Vajpayee
	Dasari Narayana Rao (1942–2017); Rajya Sabha MP for Andhra Pradesh	23 May 2004	27 November 2004	188 days	Indian National Congress	Manmohan I	Manmohan Singh
Minister of State for Coal
	Dasari Narayana Rao (1942–2017); Rajya Sabha MP for Andhra Pradesh	27 November 2004	6 April 2008	3 years, 131 days	Indian National Congress	Manmohan I	Manmohan Singh
	Santosh Bagrodia (born 1940); Rajya Sabha MP for Rajasthan	6 April 2008	22 May 2009	1 year, 46 days	Indian National Congress	Manmohan I	Manmohan Singh
	Pratik Prakashbapu Patil (born 1973); MP for Sangli	19 January 2011	26 May 2014	3 years, 127 days	Indian National Congress	Manmohan II	Manmohan Singh
	Haribhai Parthibhai Chaudhary (born 1954); MP for Banaskantha	3 September 2017	30 May 2019	1 year, 269 days	Bharatiya Janata Party	Modi I	Narendra Modi
	Raosaheb Danve (born 1955); MP for Jalna	31 May 2019	9 June 2024	5 years, 9 days	Bharatiya Janata Party	Modi II	Narendra Modi
	Satish Chandra Dubey (born 1975); Rajya Sabha MP for Bihar	10 June 2024	Incumbent	2 years, 59 days	Bharatiya Janata Party	Modi III	Narendra Modi

== Organisations ==
=== Central Public Sector Undertakings ===
- Coal India
- NLC India Limited

=== Statutory Bodies ===
- Coal Mines Provident Fund Organisation (CMPFO)
- Coal Controller Organization (CCO)

== Functions and responsibilities ==
The Ministry of Coal is responsible for development and exploitation of coal and lignite reserves in India. The subjects allocated to the Ministry which include attached and sub-ordinate or other organisations including PSUs concerned with their subjects under the Government of India (Allocation of Business) Rules, 1961, as amended from time to time, are as follows:

- Exploration and development of coking coal and non-coking coal and lignite deposits in India
- All matters relating to production, supply, distribution and prices of coal
- Development and operation of coal washeries other than those for which Department of Steel (ISPAT Vibhag) is responsible
- Low-Temperature carbonisation of coal and production of synthetic oil from coal
- Administration of the Coal Mines (Conservation and Development) Act, 1974 (28 of 1974)
- The Coal Mines Provident Fund Organisation
- The Coal Mines Welfare Organisation
- Administration of the Coal Mines Provident Fund and Miscellaneous Provision Act, 1948 (46 of 1948)
- Administration of the Coal Mines Labour Welfare Fund Act, 1947 (32 of 1947)
- Rules under the Mines Act, 1952 (32 of 1952) for the levy and collection of duty of excise on coke and coal produced and dispatched from mines and administration of rescue fund
- Administration of the Coal Bearing Areas (Acquisition and Development) Act, 1957 (20 of 1957)
