= Coal Mines Provident Fund Organisation =

Indian government agency

- Emblem of India

Agency overview
- Jurisdiction: Republic of India
- Headquarters: Office of the Coal Mines Provident Fund Commissioner, Police Line, Dhanbad-826001 (Jharkhand)
- Agency executive: Shri Vijay Kumar Mishra, Commissioner
- Website: Official website

Coal Mines Provident Fund Organisation (CMPF) is an agency of the Indian government established in 1948 under The Coal Mines Provident Fund and Miscellaneous Provisions Act 1948. It serves as the official pension fund of coal miners and is financed by coal producers on a per-tonne basis. The fund pays the pensions of about 500,000 former coal miners, and has been considered financially precarious since 2017.
