= Ministry of New and Renewable Energy =

Government ministry of India

- Navīna ēvama Navīkaraṇīya Ūrjā Maṁtrālaya
- Branch of Government of India

- Ministry of New and Renewable Energy

Agency overview
- Formed: 1982; 44 years ago
- Preceding Agency: Department of Non-conventional Energy Sources (DNES)
- Jurisdiction: Government of India
- Headquarters: New Delhi, India
- Annual budget: ₹32,914 crore (US$3.4 billion) (2026-27 est.)
- Minister responsible: Pralhad Joshi, Cabinet Minister
- Deputy Minister responsible: Shripad Yesso Naik, Minister of State
- Agency executive: Santosh Kumar Sarangi, IAS, Secretary
- Website: https://mnre.gov.in/

The Ministry of New and Renewable Energy (MNRE) is a ministry of the Government of India, headed by current Union Cabinet Minister Pralhad Joshi, that is mainly responsible for research and development, intellectual property protection, and international cooperation, promotion, and coordination in renewable energy sources such as wind power, small hydro, biogas, battery energy storage and solar power.

The broad aim of the ministry is to develop and deploy new and renewable energy for supplementing the energy requirements of India.

The ministry is headquartered in Lodi Road, New Delhi. According to the Ministry's 2016-17 annual report, India has made significant advances in several renewable energy sectors which include, solar energy, wind power, battery energy storage system (BESS) and hydroelectricity.

== History ==
The ministry was established as the Ministry of Non-Conventional Energy Sources in 1992. It adopted its current name in October 2006.

== Divisions ==
- Bio Energy
- Energy Sorage Systems
- Green Energy Coridors
- Rajbhasha
- Human Resource Development
- International Relations
- Hydrogen
- Lab Policy, Quality Control and Standardization
- Research and Development
- New Technologies
- Small Hydropower
- Solar Thermal
- Solar
- Wind

== Initiatives ==
- Jawaharlal Nehru National Solar Mission (JNNSM) - The National Solar Mission was launched on 11 January 2010 by the Prime Minister. The Mission has set the ambitious target of deploying 20,000 MW of grid-connected solar power by 2022. Further, Government has revised the target of Grid Connected Solar Power Projects from 20,000 MW by the year 2021-22 to 100,000 MW by the year 2021-22 under the National Solar Mission and it was approved by Cabinet on 17 June 2015.
- National Biogas and Manure Management Programme (NBMMP)
- Solar Lantern Programme LALA
- Solar thermal energy Demonstration Programme
- Remote Village Lighting Programme
- National Biomass Cookstoves Initiative (NBCI)
- National Offshore Wind Energy Authority
- Association of Renewable energy agencies of states (AREAS): It was formed by Ministry for better coordination and sharing of best practices among various state nodal agencies for renewable energy. The Minister in charge of the MNRE (Ministry of New and Renewable energy) is the patron while the Secretary of MNRE is the ex-officio president of the association.
- One Sun One World One Grid initiative : The ambitious project aims to connect 140 countries of South East Asia and Middle East to a trans-national solar power grid. The idea was first proposed by India in 2018 assembly of International Solar Alliance and is aimed at moving one step ahead in the direction of target of government to produce 40% of its energy requirements from the renewable sources. The idea behind this initiative is, "Sun never sets" and it is constant at a particular geographic location at a given point of time. The Ministry of New and Renewable Energy will head this initiative with technical support from the World Bank.

== Achievements ==
=== Power from renewables ===
==== Grid-based ====
As per Annual Report 2016-17 of Ministry, As of December 2016, the Ministry was successful in deploying a total of 50068.37 Megawatt (MW) capacity of grid-based renewable energy. 28700.44 MW of which was from wind power, 4333.85 MW from Small hydro Power, 7907.34 MW from Bio power 9012.66 MW from solar power (SPV), and the rest 114.08 MW from Waste to Power.

==== Off-grid ====
During the same time period, the total deployment of an off-grid based renewable energy capacity was about 1403.70 MW. Of these, biomass (non-bagasse) Cogeneration consisted of 651.91 MW, Bio mass Gasifier was 186.88 MW Waste to energy was 163.35 MW, SPV Systems (of less than 1 Kilowatt (kW)) capacity was 405.54 1 MW, and the rest from micro-Hydro and Wind power.

=== Other renewable energy systems ===
The total number of deployment of family biogas plant was 49.40 lakhs. And the total area that is covered with solar water heating (SWH) systems was 4.47 Million m^{2}.

== Institutions ==
The Ministry has 5 specialized technical institution. They are:-

- National Institute of Solar Energy (NISE): National Institute of Solar Energy, an autonomous institution of Ministry of New and Renewable (MNRE), is the apex National R&D institution in the field Solar Energy. The Government of India has converted 25-year-old Solar Energy Centre (SEC) under MNRE to an autonomous institution in September 2013 to assist the Ministry in implementing the National Solar Mission and to coordinate research, technology, skill development, training, consultancy, incubation and other related works. NISE is located in Gurugram, Haryana
- National Institute of Wind Energy (NIWE): NIWE has been established in Chennai in the year 1998, as an autonomous R&D institution by the Ministry of New and Renewable Energy (MNRE), Government of India. It is a knowledge-based institution of high quality and dedication, offers services and seeks to find complete solutions for the kinds of difficulties and improvements in the entire spectrum of the wind energy sector by carrying out further research. NIWE is located in Chennai, Tamil Nadu. Website : https://niwe.res.in/
- Sardar Swaran Singh National Institute of Bio-Energy (SSS-NIBE): SSS-NIBE is an autonomous Institution of the Ministry of New and Renewable Energy. Govt. of India spread over a sprawling campus of about 75 acres, the Institute is marching towards development into a Global Centre of Excellence in the Bio-Energy. The objectives of the Institute are to carry out and facilitate research, design, development, testing, standardization & technology demonstration eventually leading to commercialization of RD&D output with a focus on bioenergy, biofuels & synthetic fuels in solid, liquid & gaseous forms for transportation, portable & stationary applications, development of hybrid / integrated energy systems, to undertake & facilitate human resource development at all levels including postdoctoral research. It is located in Kapurthala (Punjab).
- Indian Renewable Energy Development Agency (IREDA): IREDA is a Non-Banking Financial Institution under the administrative control of this Ministry for providing term loans for renewable energy and energy efficiency projects.IREDA is a Public Limited Government Company.
- Solar Energy Corporation of India (SECI): SECI is a CPSU under the administrative control of the Ministry of New and Renewable Energy (MNRE), set up on 20th Sept 2011 to facilitate the implementation of JNNSM and achievement of targets set therein. It is the only CPSU dedicated to the solar energy sector. It was originally incorporated as a section-25 (not for profit) company under the Companies Act, 1956

== State Nodal Agencies ==
The Ministry has established state nodal agencies in different states and union territories of India to promote and expand the growth of efficient energy use of renewable energy in their respective states. The primary objective of a state nodal agency under this ministry is to develop, coordinate, finance and promote research projects in the new and renewable energy field. It is also expected to devise programmes for research and development as well as applicative extensions of new and renewable energy sources.

State Nodal Agencies under Ministry of New and Renewable Energy, India
State	Nodal Agency	Managing Director/Chief Executive Officer	Notes
Andhra Pradesh	Non-Conventional Energy Development Corporation of Andhra Pradesh (NEDCAP) Ltd.	M. Kamalakar Babu	
Arunachal Pradesh	Arunachal Pradesh Energy Development Agency (APEDA)	Marki Loya	
Assam	Assam Energy Development Agency	Haresh Chandra Dutta	
Bihar	Bihar Renewable Energy Development Agency	Dayanidhan Pandey	
Chhattisgarh	Chhattisgarh State Renewable Energy Development Agency (CREDA)	S. K. Shukla	
Goa	Goa Energy Development Agency	Michael M. D’souza	
Gujarat	Gujarat Energy Development Agency (GEDA)	V A Vaghela	
Haryana	Haryana Renewal Energy Development Agency (HAREDA)	Amneet P. Kumar	
Himachal Pradesh	HIMURJA	Bhanu Pratap Singh	
Jammu & Kashmir	Jammu & Kashmir Energy Development Agency (JAKEDA)	Sh. Gulzar Hussain	
Jharkhand	Jharkhand Renewable Energy Development Agency	K. K. Verma	
Karnataka	Karnataka Renewable Energy Development Agency Ltd.	G.V. Balaram	
Kerala	Agency for Non-conventional Energy and Rural Technology (ANERT)	M Jayaraju	
Madhya Pradesh	MP Urja Vikas Nigam Ltd.	SR Mohanty	
Maharashtra	Maharashtra Energy Development Agency (MEDA)	Pravin Darade	
Manipur	Manipur Renewable Energy Development Agency (MANIREDA)	Birmani Singh Chingtham	
Meghalaya	Meghalaya Non-conventional & Rural Energy Development Agency	Jopthiaw Lyngdoh	
Mizoram	Zoram Energy Development Agency (ZEDA)	Arun Kumar Tripathi	
Nagaland	Nagaland Renewable Energy Development Agency	K.T. Wabang	
Odisha	Odisha Renewable Energy Development Agency (OREDA)	Roopa Mishra	
Punjab	Punjab Energy Development Agency	Amarpal Singh	
Rajasthan	Rajasthan Renewable Energy Corporation Limited	B.K. Dosi	
Sikkim	Sikkim Renewable Energy Development Agency	T.T. Bhutia	
Tamil Nadu	Tamil Nadu Energy Development Agency(TEDA)		
Tripura	Tripura Renewable Energy Development Agency	K.K.Ghosh	
Uttar Pradesh	Non-conventional Energy Development Agency (NEDA)	Kumar Ravikant Singh	
Uttarakhand	Uttarakhand Renewable Energy Development Agency (UREDA)	Ranjana Rajguru	
Puducherry UT	Renewable Energy Agency Puducherry (REAP)		
West Bengal	West Bengal Renewable Energy Development Agency (WBREDA)	Narayan Swaroop Nigam	

== Cabinet Ministers ==
- Key: I/C – Independent Charge

Portrait	Minister (Birth-Death) Constituency	Term of office			Political party	Ministry	Prime Minister
Portrait	Minister (Birth-Death) Constituency	From	To	Period	Political party	Ministry	Prime Minister
Minister of Non-Conventional Energy Sources
	Kalpnath Rai (1941–1999); MP for Ghosi (Minister of State, I/C)	21 June 1991	2 July 1992	1 year, 11 days	Indian National Congress	Rao	P. V. Narasimha Rao
	P. V. Narasimha Rao (1921–2004); MP for Nandyal (Prime Minister)	2 July 1992	16 May 1996	3 years, 319 days	Indian National Congress	Rao	P. V. Narasimha Rao
	Atal Bihari Vajpayee (1924–2018); MP for Lucknow (Prime Minister)	16 May 1996	1 June 1996	16 days	Bharatiya Janata Party	Vajpayee I	Self
	H. D. Deve Gowda (born 1933); Rajya Sabha MP for Karnataka (Prime Minister)	1 June 1996	21 February 1997	265 days	Janata Dal	Deve Gowda	H. D. Deve Gowda
	Captain; Jai Narain Prasad Nishad (1930–2018); MP for Muzaffarpur (Minister of State, I/C)	21 February 1997	21 April 1997	323 days	Janata Dal	Deve Gowda	H. D. Deve Gowda
	Captain; Jai Narain Prasad Nishad (1930–2018); MP for Muzaffarpur (Minister of State, I/C)	21 April 1997	10 January 1998	323 days	Janata Dal	Gujral	Inder Kumar Gujral
	Inder Kumar Gujral (1919–2012); Rajya Sabha MP for Bihar (Prime Minister)	10 January 1998	19 March 1998	68 days	Janata Dal	Gujral	Inder Kumar Gujral
	Atal Bihari Vajpayee (1924–2018); MP for Lucknow (Prime Minister)	19 March 1998	3 February 1999	321 days	Bharatiya Janata Party	Vajpayee II	Atal Bihari Vajpayee
	Rangarajan Kumaramangalam (1952–2000); MP for Tiruchirappalli	3 February 1999	13 October 1999	252 days	Bharatiya Janata Party	Vajpayee II	Atal Bihari Vajpayee
	M. Kannappan; MP for Tiruchengode (Minister of State, I/C)	13 October 1999	30 December 2003	4 years, 78 days	Dravida Munnetra Kazhagam	Vajpayee III	Atal Bihari Vajpayee
	Atal Bihari Vajpayee (1924–2018); MP for Lucknow (Prime Minister)	30 December 2003	9 January 2004	10 days	Bharatiya Janata Party	Vajpayee III	Atal Bihari Vajpayee
	Kariya Munda (born 1936); MP for Khunti	9 January 2004	22 May 2004	134 days	Bharatiya Janata Party	Vajpayee III	Atal Bihari Vajpayee
	Vilas Muttemwar (born 1949); MP for Nagpur (Minister of State, I/C)	23 May 2004	20 October 2006	2 years, 150 days	Indian National Congress	Manmohan I	Manmohan Singh
Minister of New and Renewable Energy
	Vilas Muttemwar (born 1949); MP for Nagpur (Minister of State, I/C)	20 October 2006	22 May 2009	2 years, 214 days	Indian National Congress	Manmohan I	Manmohan Singh
	Farooq Abdullah (born 1937); MP for Srinagar	29 May 2009	26 May 2014	4 years, 362 days	Jammu and Kashmir National Conference	Manmohan II	Manmohan Singh
	Piyush Goyal (born 1964); Rajya Sabha MP for Maharashtra	27 May 2014	3 September 2017	3 years, 99 days	Bharatiya Janata Party	Modi I	Narendra Modi
	Raj Kumar Singh (born 1952); MP for Arrah (Minister of State, I/C until 7 Jul 2021)	3 September 2017	30 May 2017	6 years, 280 days	Bharatiya Janata Party	Modi I	Narendra Modi
	Raj Kumar Singh (born 1952); MP for Arrah (Minister of State, I/C until 7 Jul 2021)	31 May 2019	9 June 2024	6 years, 280 days	Bharatiya Janata Party	Modi II	Narendra Modi
	Pralhad Joshi (born 1962); MP for Dharwad	10 June 2024	Incumbent	2 years, 60 days	Bharatiya Janata Party	Modi III	Narendra Modi

== Ministers of State ==
Portrait	Minister (Birth-Death) Constituency	Term of office			Political party	Ministry	Prime Minister
Portrait	Minister (Birth-Death) Constituency	From	To	Period	Political party	Ministry	Prime Minister
Minister of State for Non-Conventional Energy Sources
	Sukh Ram (1927–2022); MP for Mandi	2 July 1992	18 January 1993	200 days	Indian National Congress	Rao	P. V. Narasimha Rao
	S. Krishna Kumar (born 1939); MP for Quilon	18 January 1993	13 September 1995	2 years, 238 days	Indian National Congress	Rao	P. V. Narasimha Rao
	P. J. Kurien (born 1941); MP for Mavelikara	13 September 1995	16 May 1996	246 days	Indian National Congress	Rao	P. V. Narasimha Rao
	Samudrala Venugopal Chary (born 1959); MP for Adilabad	29 June 1996	21 February 1997	237 days	Telugu Desam Party	Deve Gowda	H. D. Deve Gowda
	T. R. Baalu (born 1941); MP for Chennai South	10 January 1998	19 March 1998	68 days	Dravida Munnetra Kazhagam	Vajpayee II	Atal Bihari Vajpayee
Minister of State for New and Renewable Energy
	S. Jagathrakshakan (born 1950); MP for Arakkonam	28 October 2012	2 November 2012	5 days	Dravida Munnetra Kazhagam	Manmohan II	Manmohan Singh
	Bhagwanth Khuba (born 1967); MP for Bidar	7 July 2021	9 June 2024	2 years, 338 days	Bharatiya Janata Party	Modi II	Narendra Modi
	Shripad Naik (born 1952); MP for North Goa	10 June 2024	Incumbent	2 years, 60 days	Bharatiya Janata Party	Modi III	Narendra Modi

== See also ==
- Energy policy of India
- National hydrogen energy road map
- Renewable energy in India
- Wind power in India
