= Ministry of Food Processing Industries =

Government ministry of India

- खाद्य प्रसंस्करण उद्योग मंत्रालय; Khādya Prasaṃskaraṇa Udyoga Maṃtrālaya
- Branch of Government of India

- Ministry of Food Processing Industries

Agency overview
- Formed: 1947
- Jurisdiction: Government of India
- Headquarters: New Delhi
- Annual budget: ₹4,364.22 crore (US$450 million) (2025-26 est.)
- Cabinet Minister responsible: Chirag Paswan
- Agency executives: Chirag Paswan, Cabinet Minister; Vacant, Minister of State; Avinash Purushottam Das Joshi, Secretary
- Website: mofpi.gov.in

The Ministry of Food Processing Industries (MOFPI) is a federal ministry of the Government of India responsible for the formulation and administration of the rules, regulations, and laws related to food processing in India.

The ministry was established in 1988 with the objectives of developing a flourishing food processing industry, bolstering employment in the rural regions, and enabling farmers with modern technology.

== Cabinet Ministers ==
- Note: I/C – Independent Charge

Portrait	Minister (Birth-Death) Constituency	Term of office			Political party	Ministry	Prime Minister
Portrait	Minister (Birth-Death) Constituency	From	To	Period	Political party	Ministry	Prime Minister
Minister of Food Processing Industries
	Jagdish Tytler (born 1944); MP for Delhi Sadar (Minister of State, I/C)	25 June 1988	2 December 1989	1 year, 160 days	Indian National Congress	Rajiv II	Rajiv Gandhi
	Sharad Yadav (1947–2023); MP for Badaun	6 December 1989	10 November 1990	339 days	Janata Dal	Vishwanath	Vishwanath Pratap Singh
	Hukmdev Narayan Yadav (born 1939); MP for Sitamarhi	21 November 1990	21 June 1991	212 days	Samajwadi Janata Party (Rashtriya)	Chandra Shekhar	Chandra Shekhar
	Giridhar Gamang (born 1943); MP for Koraput (Minister of State, I/C)	21 June 1991	17 January 1993	1 year, 210 days	Indian National Congress (I)	Rao	P. V. Narasimha Rao
	Tarun Gogoi (1936–2020); MP for Kaliabor (Minister of State, I/C)	17 January 1993	13 September 1995	2 years, 239 days	Indian National Congress (I)	Rao	P. V. Narasimha Rao
	Brigadier; Kamakhya Prasad Singh Deo AVSM (born 1941); MP for Dhenkanal (Minister of State, I/C)	15 September 1995	16 May 1996	244 days	Indian National Congress (I)	Rao	P. V. Narasimha Rao
	Atal Bihari Vajpayee (1924–2018); MP for Lucknow (Prime Minister)	16 May 1996	1 June 1996	16 days	Bharatiya Janata Party	Vajpayee I	Atal Bihari Vajpayee
	H. D. Deve Gowda (born 1933); Unelected (Prime Minister)	1 June 1996	6 July 1996	35 days	Janata Dal	Deve Gowda	H. D. Deve Gowda
	Dilip Ray (born 1954); Rajya Sabha MP for Odisha (Minister of State, I/C)	6 July 1996	25 December 1997	1 year, 172 days	Janata Dal	Deve Gowda	H. D. Deve Gowda
	Dilip Ray (born 1954); Rajya Sabha MP for Odisha (Minister of State, I/C)	6 July 1996	25 December 1997	1 year, 172 days	Janata Dal	Gujral	Inder Kumar Gujral
	S. Jaipal Reddy (1942–2019); Rajya Sabha MP for Andhra Pradesh	25 December 1997	19 March 1998	84 days	Janata Dal	Gujral	Inder Kumar Gujral
	Atal Bihari Vajpayee (1924–2018); MP for Lucknow (Prime Minister)	19 March 1998	3 February 1999	321 days	Bharatiya Janata Party	Vajpayee II	Atal Bihari Vajpayee
	Pramod Mahajan (1949–2006); Rajya Sabha MP for Maharashtra	3 February 1999	13 October 1999	252 days	Bharatiya Janata Party	Vajpayee II	Atal Bihari Vajpayee
Merged with the Ministry of Agriculture during this interval
Minister of Food Processing Industries
	Chaman Lal Gupta (1934–2021); MP for Udhampur (Minister of State, I/C)	1 September 2001	1 July 2002	303 days	Bharatiya Janata Party	Vajpayee III	Atal Bihari Vajpayee
	N. T. Shanmugam (born 1947); MP for Vellore (Minister of State, I/C)	1 July 2002	15 January 2004	1 year, 198 days	Pattali Makkal Katchi	Vajpayee III	Atal Bihari Vajpayee
	Atal Bihari Vajpayee (1924–2018); MP for Lucknow (Prime Minister)	15 January 2004	17 January 2004	2 days	Bharatiya Janata Party	Vajpayee III	Atal Bihari Vajpayee
	Rajnath Singh (born 1951); Rajya Sabha MP for Uttar Pradesh	17 January 2004	22 May 2004	126 days	Bharatiya Janata Party	Vajpayee III	Atal Bihari Vajpayee
	Subodh Kant Sahay (born 1951); MP for Ranchi (Minister of State, I/C until 22 May 2009)	23 May 2004	22 May 2009	6 years, 235 days	Indian National Congress	Manmohan I	Manmohan Singh
	Subodh Kant Sahay (born 1951); MP for Ranchi (Minister of State, I/C until 22 May 2009)	28 May 2009	19 January 2011	6 years, 235 days	Indian National Congress	Manmohan II	Manmohan Singh
	Sharad Pawar (born 1940); MP for Madha (2009–2014); Rajya Sabha MP for Maharashtra (from 2014)	19 January 2011	26 May 2014	3 years, 127 days	Nationalist Congress Party	Manmohan II	Manmohan Singh
	Harsimrat Kaur Badal (born 1966); MP for Bathinda	27 May 2014	17 September 2020	6 years, 112 days	Shiromani Akali Dal	Modi I	Narendra Modi
	Harsimrat Kaur Badal (born 1966); MP for Bathinda	27 May 2014	17 September 2020	6 years, 112 days	Shiromani Akali Dal	Modi II	Narendra Modi
	Narendra Singh Tomar (born 1957); MP for Morena	17 September 2020	7 July 2021	293 days	Bharatiya Janata Party	Modi II	Narendra Modi
	Pashupati Kumar Paras (born 1952); MP for Hajipur	7 July 2021	19 March 2024	2 years, 256 days	Rashtriya Lok Janshakti Party	Modi II	Narendra Modi
	Kiren Rijiju (born 1971); MP for Arunachal West	20 March 2024	10 June 2024	82 days	Bharatiya Janata Party	Modi II	Narendra Modi
	Chirag Paswan (born 1982); MP for Hajipur	10 June 2024	Incumbent	2 years, 59 days	Lok Janshakti Party (Ram Vilas)	Modi III	Narendra Modi

== Ministers of State ==
Portrait	Minister (Birth-Death) Constituency	Term of office			Political party	Ministry	Prime Minister
Portrait	Minister (Birth-Death) Constituency	From	To	Period	Political party	Ministry	Prime Minister
	Arun Subhashchandra Yadav (born 1974); MP for Khandwa	19 January 2011	12 July 2011	174 days	Indian National Congress	Manmohan II	Manmohan Singh
	Harish Rawat (born 1948); MP for Haridwar	19 January 2011	28 October 2012	1 year, 283 days	Indian National Congress	Manmohan II	Manmohan Singh
	Charan Das Mahant (born 1954); MP for Korba	12 July 2011	26 May 2014	2 years, 318 days	Indian National Congress	Manmohan II	Manmohan Singh
	Tariq Anwar (born 1951); Rajya Sabha MP for Maharashtra	28 October 2012	26 May 2014	1 year, 210 days	Nationalist Congress Party	Manmohan II	Manmohan Singh
	Sanjeev Balyan (born 1972); MP for Muzaffarnagar	27 May 2014	9 November 2014	166 days	Bharatiya Janata Party	Modi I	Narendra Modi
	Niranjan Jyoti (born 1967); MP for Fatehpur	9 November 2014	30 May 2019	4 years, 202 days	Bharatiya Janata Party	Modi I	Narendra Modi
	Rameswar Teli (born 1970); MP for Dibrugarh	31 May 2019	7 July 2021	2 years, 37 days	Bharatiya Janata Party	Modi II	Narendra Modi
	Prahlad Singh Patel (born 1960); MP for Damoh	7 July 2021	7 December 2023	2 years, 153 days	Bharatiya Janata Party	Modi II	Narendra Modi
	Shobha Karandlaje (born 1966); MP for Udupi Chikmagalur	7 December 2023	9 June 2024	185 days	Bharatiya Janata Party	Modi II	Narendra Modi
	Ravneet Singh Bittu (born 1975); Rajya Sabha MP for Rajasthan (Until 21 June 2026)	10 June 2024	24 Jul 2026	2 years, 44 days	Bharatiya Janata Party	Modi III	Narendra Modi

== Functions of the ministry ==
- Policy support and developmental
- Promotional and technical
- Advisory and regulatory

== Goals of MOFPI ==
- Better utilization and value addition of agricultural produce for enhancement of income of farmers.
- Minimizing wastage at all stages in the food processing chain by the development of infrastructure for storage, transportation and processing of agro-food produce.
- Induction of modern technology into the food processing industries from both domestic and external sources.
- Maximum utilization of agricultural residues and by-products of the primary agricultural produce as also of the processed industry.
- To encourage R&D in food processing for product and process development and improved packaging.
- To provide policy support, promotional initiatives and physical facilities to promote value added exports

== Roles of MOFPI ==
The strategic role and functions of the Ministry fall under three categories:

- Policy support developmental & promotional
- Technical & advisory
- Regulatory.

It is concerned with the formulation & implementation of policies and plans for all the industries under its domain within the overall national priorities and objectives. Its main focus areas include—development of infrastructure, technological up gradation, development of backward linkages, enforcement of quality standards and expanding domestic as well as export markets for processed food products.

The Ministry acts as a catalyst and facilitator for attracting domestic & foreign investments towards developing large integrated processing capacities, by creating conducive policy environment, including rationalization of taxes & duties. It processes applications for foreign collaborations, Export Oriented Units (EOUs) etc. and assists/guides prospective entrepreneur in his endeavour.

Post liberalization, it has approved a large no. of joint ventures, foreign collaborations, industrial licenses and 100% EOU proposals in different food processing areas and has taken major policy initiatives to facilitate an accelerated growth of the industry. The functions of the Ministry can be broadly classified as follows:

== Regulatory ==
Earlier the regulatory responsibilities of MoFPI were to implement Fruit Products Order (FPO), However, by the enactment of Food Safety and Standards Act, 2006, these regulatory responsibilities are transferred to Food Safety Authority of India, New Delhi which is under control of Ministry of Health and Family Welfare.
