= Ministry of Consumer Affairs, Food and Public Distribution =

Government ministry of India

- Branch of Government of India

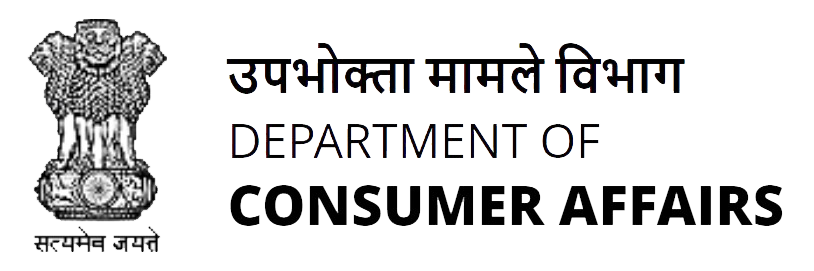
- Ministry of Consumer Affairs

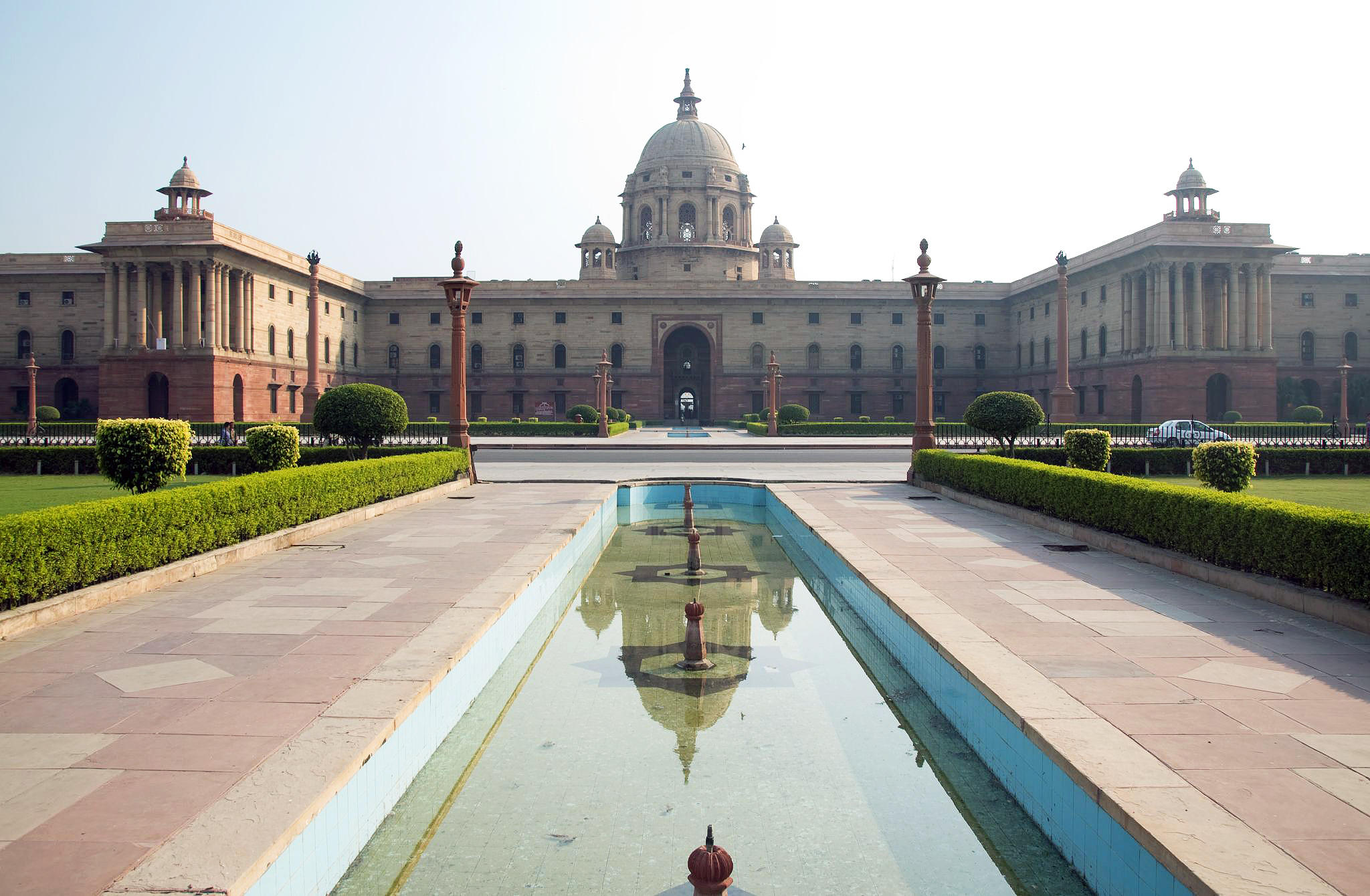
- South Block building, housing the Cabinet Secretariat

Agency overview
- Formed: 2 September 1946
- Jurisdiction: Government of India
- Headquarters: Sansad Bhavan, New Delhi
- Annual budget: ₹235,047 crore (US$24 billion) (2026–27 est.)
- Ministers responsible: Pralhad Joshi, (Cabinet Minister); Nimuben Bambhaniya, (Minister of State); Banwari Lal Verma, (Minister of State)
- Website: https://consumeraffairs.gov.in/ https://dfpd.gov.in/

The Ministry of Consumer Affairs, Food and Public Distribution is a government ministry of India. The ministry is headed by a Cabinet rank minister.

== Departments ==
The ministry is divided into two departments, the Department of Food and Public Distribution and the Department of Consumer Affairs.

=== Department of Food and Public Distribution ===
The objectives of the department are to ensure:

- remunerative rates for the farmers.
- supply of food grains at reasonable prices through the public distribution system.

==== Public Distribution System ====
The Indian Public Distribution System (PDS) is a national food security system that distributes subsidised food to India's poor. Major commodities include wheat, rice and sugar. Surpluses of food from increased crop yields (as a result of the Green Revolution and good monsoon seasons) are managed by the Food Corporation of India, established by the Food Corporation Act 1964. The system implements national policy for farm price support, operations, procurement, storage, preservation, inter-state movement and distribution. PDS has a network of about 478,000 Fair Price Shops (FPS), perhaps the largest distribution network of its type in the world, operated by the Union Government and state governments.

=== Department of Consumer Affairs ===
The department administers the policies for Consumer Cooperatives, price monitoring, essential commodity availability, consumer movement and control of statutory bodies such as the Bureau of Indian Standards (BIS) and Weights and Measures.

The department is responsible for:

- National Test House
- Standards of Weights and Measures
- The Bureau of Indian Standards
- Monitoring of Prices and Availability of essential commodities
- The Consumer Protection Act, 2019
- Consumer Welfare Fund
- Internal Trade
- Inter-State Trade: The Spirituous Preparations (Inter-State Trade and Commerce) Control Act, 1955 (39 of 1955).
- Control of Futures Trading: the Forward Contracts (Regulations) Act, 1952 (74 of 1952).

The department regulates the availability and prescribes measures to see that the system works towards the food security of vulnerable people. This intent is to increase dignity, accountability, visibility, positive orientation and changed mind set.

== Institutes ==
1. National Sugar Institute, Kanpur

== Related Agencies ==
1. Central Consumer Protection Authority

== Cabinet Ministers ==
=== Food and Agriculture (1947–1971) ===
Portrait	Minister (Birth-Death) Constituency	Term of office			Political party	Ministry	Prime Minister
Portrait	Minister (Birth-Death) Constituency	From	To	Period	Political party	Ministry	Prime Minister
Minister of Food and Agriculture
	Rajendra Prasad (1884–1963); MP for Bihar (Constituency Assembly)	15 August 1947	14 January 1948	152 days	Indian National Congress	Nehru I	Jawaharlal Nehru
	Jairamdas Daulatram (1891–1979); MP for East Punjab (Constituent Assembly)	19 January 1948	13 May 1950	2 years, 114 days	Indian National Congress	Nehru I	Jawaharlal Nehru
	Kanaiyalal Maneklal Munshi (1887–1971); MP for Bombay (Constituent Assembly)	13 May 1950	13 May 1952	2 years, 0 days	Indian National Congress	Nehru I	Jawaharlal Nehru
	Rafi Ahmed Kidwai (1894–1954); MP for Bahraich District (East)	13 May 1952	24 October 1954^{[†]}	2 years, 164 days	Indian National Congress	Nehru II	Jawaharlal Nehru
	Panjabrao Deshmukh (1898–1965); MP for Amravati (Minister without cabinet rank)	29 October 1954	25 November 1954	27 days	Indian National Congress	Nehru II	Jawaharlal Nehru
	Ajit Prasad Jain (1902–1977); MP for Saharanpur	25 November 1954	24 August 1959	4 years, 272 days	Indian National Congress	Nehru II	Jawaharlal Nehru
	Ajit Prasad Jain (1902–1977); MP for Saharanpur	25 November 1954	24 August 1959	4 years, 272 days	Indian National Congress	Nehru III	Jawaharlal Nehru
	S. K. Patil (1898–1981); MP for Mumbai South	24 August 1959	1 September 1963	4 years, 8 days	Indian National Congress	Nehru III	Jawaharlal Nehru
	S. K. Patil (1898–1981); MP for Mumbai South	24 August 1959	1 September 1963	4 years, 8 days	Indian National Congress	Nehru IV	Jawaharlal Nehru
	Swaran Singh (1907–1994); MP for Jullundur	1 September 1963	9 June 1964	282 days	Indian National Congress	Nehru IV	Jawaharlal Nehru
	Swaran Singh (1907–1994); MP for Jullundur	1 September 1963	9 June 1964	282 days	Indian National Congress	Nanda I	Gulzarilal Nanda
	Chidambaram Subramaniam (1910–2000); MP for Pollachi	9 June 1964	24 January 1966	1 year, 229 days	Indian National Congress	Shastri	Lal Bahadur Shastri
	Chidambaram Subramaniam (1910–2000); MP for Pollachi	9 June 1964	24 January 1966	1 year, 229 days	Indian National Congress	Nanda II	Gulzarilal Nanda
Minister of Food, Agriculture, Community Development and Cooperation
	Chidambaram Subramaniam (1910–2000); MP for Pollachi	24 January 1966^{[§]}	13 March 1967	1 year, 48 days	Indian National Congress	Indira I	Indira Gandhi
	Jagjivan Ram (1908–1986); MP for Sasaram	13 March 1967	27 June 1970	3 years, 106 days	Indian National Congress	Indira II	Indira Gandhi
	Fakhruddin Ali Ahmed (1905–1977); MP for Barpeta	27 June 1970	2 May 1971	309 days	Indian National Congress	Indira II	Indira Gandhi
	Fakhruddin Ali Ahmed (1905–1977); MP for Barpeta	27 June 1970	2 May 1971	309 days	Indian National Congress (R)	Indira III	Indira Gandhi

=== Civil Supplies (1974–1983) ===
Portrait	Minister (Birth-Death) Constituency	Term of office			Political party	Ministry	Prime Minister
Portrait	Minister (Birth-Death) Constituency	From	To	Period	Political party	Ministry	Prime Minister
Minister of Industry and Civil Supplies
	T. A. Pai (1922–1981); MP for Karnataka (Rajya Sabha)	10 October 1974	9 August 1976	1 year, 304 days	Indian National Congress (R)	Indira III	Indira Gandhi
Minister of Civil Supplies and Cooperation
	Syed Mir Qasim (1921–2004); MP for Jammu and Kashmir (Rajya Sabha)	9 August 1976	24 March 1977	227 days	Indian National Congress (R)	Indira III	Indira Gandhi
Minister of Commerce and Civil Supplies
	Mohan Dharia (1925–2013); MP for Pune	24 March 1977	28 July 1979	2 years, 126 days	Janata Party	Desai	Morarji Desai
	Hitendra Kanaiyalal Desai (1915–1993); MP for Godhra	30 July 1979	14 January 1980	349 days	Janata Party (Secular)	Charan	Charan Singh
Minister of Civil Supplies
	Pranab Mukherjee (1935–2020); MP for Gujarat (Rajya Sabha)	14 January 1980	8 June 1980	146 days	Indian National Congress	Indira IV	Indira Gandhi
	Vidya Charan Shukla (1929–2013); MP for Mahasamund	8 June 1980	19 March 1981	284 days	Indian National Congress	Indira IV	Indira Gandhi
	Rao Birender Singh (1921–2000); MP for Mahendragarh	19 March 1981	2 September 1982	1 year, 167 days	Indian National Congress	Indira IV	Indira Gandhi
Minister of Civil Supplies and Cooperation
	Bhagwat Jha Azad (1922–2011); MP for Bhagalpur (Minister of State, I/C)	2 September 1982	29 January 1983	149 days	Indian National Congress	Indira IV	Indira Gandhi
	Bhishma Narain Singh (1933–2018); MP for Bihar (Rajya Sabha)	29 January 1983	14 February 1983	16 days	Indian National Congress	Indira IV	Indira Gandhi

=== Food and Civil Supplies (1983–1991) ===
Portrait	Minister (Birth-Death) Constituency	Term of office			Political party	Ministry	Prime Minister
Portrait	Minister (Birth-Death) Constituency	From	To	Period	Political party	Ministry	Prime Minister
	Bhagwat Jha Azad (1922–2011); MP for Bhagalpur (Minister of State, I/C)	14 February 1983	31 October 1984	1 year, 260 days	Indian National Congress	Indira IV	Indira Gandhi
	Bhagwat Jha Azad (1922–2011); MP for Bhagalpur (Minister of State, I/C)	4 November 1984	31 December 1984	57 days	Indian National Congress	Rajiv I	Rajiv Gandhi
	Rao Birender Singh (1921–2000); MP for Mahendragarh	31 December 1984	25 September 1985	268 days	Indian National Congress	Rajiv II	Rajiv Gandhi
	Brigadier; Kamakhya Prasad Singh Deo AVSM (born 1941); MP for Dhenkanal (Minister of State, I/C)	25 September 1985	27 January 1986	124 days	Indian National Congress	Rajiv II	Rajiv Gandhi
	P. Shiv Shankar (1929–2017); MP for Gujarat (Rajya Sabha)	27 January 1986	12 May 1986	105 days	Indian National Congress	Rajiv II	Rajiv Gandhi
	H. K. L. Bhagat (1921–2005); MP for East Delhi	12 May 1986	14 February 1988	1 year, 278 days	Indian National Congress	Rajiv II	Rajiv Gandhi
	Sukh Ram (1927–2022); MP for Mandi (Minister of State, I/C)	14 February 1988	2 December 1989	1 year, 291 days	Indian National Congress	Rajiv II	Rajiv Gandhi
	Vishwanath Pratap Singh (1931–2008); MP for Fatehpur (Prime Minister)	2 December 1989	8 December 1989	6 days	Janata Dal	Vishwanath	Vishwanath Pratap Singh
	Nathuram Mirdha (1921–1996); MP for Nagaur	8 December 1989	10 November 1990	337 days	Janata Dal	Vishwanath	Vishwanath Pratap Singh
	Chandra Shekhar (1927–2007); MP for Ballia (Prime Minister)	10 November 1990	21 November 1990	11 days	Samajwadi Janata Party (Rashtriya)	Chandra Shekhar	Chandra Shekhar
	Rao Birender Singh (1921–2000); MP for Mahendragarh	21 November 1990	26 June 1991	217 days	Samajwadi Janata Party (Rashtriya)	Chandra Shekhar	Chandra Shekhar
Bifurcated into the Ministry of Food and the Ministry of Civil Supplies and Public Distribution

=== Food (1991–1997) ===
Portrait	Minister (Birth-Death) Constituency	Term of office			Political party	Ministry	Prime Minister
Portrait	Minister (Birth-Death) Constituency	From	To	Period	Political party	Ministry	Prime Minister
	Tarun Gogoi (1936–2020); MP for Kaliabor (Minister of State, I/C)	21 June 1991	17 January 1993	1 year, 210 days	Indian National Congress	Rao	P. V. Narasimha Rao
	Kalpnath Rai (1941–1999); MP for Ghosi (Minister of State, I/C)	17 January 1993	21 December 1994	1 year, 338 days	Indian National Congress	Rao	P. V. Narasimha Rao
	P. V. Narasimha Rao (1921–2004); MP for Nandyal (Prime Minister)	21 December 1994	10 February 1995	51 days	Indian National Congress	Rao	P. V. Narasimha Rao
	Ajit Singh (1939–2021); MP for Baghpat	10 February 1995	16 May 1996	1 year, 96 days	Indian National Congress	Rao	P. V. Narasimha Rao
	Atal Bihari Vajpayee (1924–2018); MP for Lucknow (Prime Minister)	16 May 1996	1 June 1996	16 days	Bharatiya Janata Party	Vajpayee I	Atal Bihari Vajpayee
	Devendra Prasad Yadav (born 1953); MP for Jhanjharpur	1 June 1996	21 April 1997	324 days	Janata Dal	Deve Gowda	H. D. Deve Gowda
	Inder Kumar Gujral (1919–2012); MP for Bihar (Rajya Sabha) (Prime Minister)	21 April 1997	23 April 1997	2 days	Janata Dal	Gujral	Inder Kumar Gujral
	Chaturanan Mishra (1925–2011); MP for Madhubani	23 April 1997	9 June 1997	47 days	Communist Party of India	Gujral	Inder Kumar Gujral
Merged with Ministry of Civil Supplies, Consumer Affairs and Public Distribution to form the Ministry of Food and Consumer Affairs

=== Civil Supplies, Consumer Affairs and Public Distribution (1991–1997) ===
Portrait	Minister (Birth-Death) Constituency	Term of office			Political party	Ministry	Prime Minister
Portrait	Minister (Birth-Death) Constituency	From	To	Period	Political party	Ministry	Prime Minister
	P. V. Narasimha Rao (1921–2004); MP for Nandyal (Prime Minister)	21 June 1991	18 January 1993	1 year, 211 days	Indian National Congress	Rao	P. V. Narasimha Rao
	A. K. Antony (born 1940); MP for Kerala (Rajya Sabha)	18 January 1993	8 February 1995	2 years, 21 days	Indian National Congress	Rao	P. V. Narasimha Rao
	Buta Singh (1934–2021); MP for Jalore	10 February 1995	20 February 1996	1 year, 10 days	Indian National Congress	Rao	P. V. Narasimha Rao
	P. V. Narasimha Rao (1921–2004); MP for Nandyal (Prime Minister)	20 February 1996	16 May 1996	86 days	Indian National Congress	Rao	P. V. Narasimha Rao
	Atal Bihari Vajpayee (1924–2018); MP for Lucknow (Prime Minister)	16 May 1996	1 June 1996	16 days	Bharatiya Janata Party	Vajpayee I	Atal Bihari Vajpayee
	Devendra Prasad Yadav (born 1953); MP for Jhanjharpur	1 June 1996	21 April 1997	324 days	Janata Dal	Deve Gowda	H. D. Deve Gowda
	Inder Kumar Gujral (1919–2012); MP for Bihar (Rajya Sabha) (Prime Minister)	21 April 1997	23 April 1997	2 days	Janata Dal	Gujral	Inder Kumar Gujral
	Chaturanan Mishra (1925–2011); MP for Madhubani	23 April 1997	9 June 1997	47 days	Communist Party of India	Gujral	Inder Kumar Gujral
Merged with Ministry of Food to form the Ministry of Food and Consumer Affairs

=== Consumer Affairs, Food and Public Distribution (1997–present) ===
Portrait	Minister (Birth-Death) Constituency	Term of office			Political party	Ministry	Prime Minister
Portrait	Minister (Birth-Death) Constituency	From	To	Period	Political party	Ministry	Prime Minister
Minister of Food and Consumer Affairs
	Raghuvansh Prasad Singh (1946–2020); MP for Vaishali (Minister of State, I/C)	9 June 1997	10 January 1998	215 days	Rashtriya Janata Dal	Gujral	Inder Kumar Gujral
	Balwant Singh Ramoowalia (born 1942); MP for Uttar Pradesh (Rajya Sabha)	10 January 1998	19 March 1998	68 days	Independent	Gujral	Inder Kumar Gujral
	Surjit Singh Barnala (1925–2017); MP for Sangrur	19 March 1998	13 October 1999	1 year, 208 days	Shiromani Akali Dal	Vajpayee II	Atal Bihari Vajpayee
Minister of Consumer Affairs and Public Distribution
	Shanta Kumar (born 1934); MP for Kangra	13 October 1999	17 July 2000	278 days	Bharatiya Janata Party	Vajpayee III	Atal Bihari Vajpayee
Minister of Consumer Affairs, Food and Public Distribution
	Shanta Kumar (born 1934); MP for Kangra	17 July 2000	1 July 2002	1 year, 349 days	Bharatiya Janata Party	Vajpayee III	Atal Bihari Vajpayee
	Sharad Yadav (1947–2023); MP for Madhepura	1 July 2002	22 May 2004	1 year, 326 days	Janata Dal (United)	Vajpayee III	Atal Bihari Vajpayee
	Sharad Pawar (born 1940); MP for Baramati, until 2009; MP for Madha, from 2009	23 May 2004	19 January 2011	6 years, 241 days	Nationalist Congress Party	Manmohan I	Manmohan Singh
	Sharad Pawar (born 1940); MP for Baramati, until 2009; MP for Madha, from 2009	23 May 2004	19 January 2011	6 years, 241 days	Nationalist Congress Party	Manmohan II	Manmohan Singh
	K. V. Thomas (born 1946); MP for Ernakulam (Minister of State, I/C)	19 January 2011	26 May 2014	3 years, 127 days	Indian National Congress	Manmohan II	Manmohan Singh
	Ram Vilas Paswan (1946–2020); MP for Hajipur, until 2019; MP for Bihar (Rajya Sabha), from 2019	27 May 2014	8 October 2020^{[†]}	6 years, 134 days	Lok Janshakti Party	Modi I	Narendra Modi
	Ram Vilas Paswan (1946–2020); MP for Hajipur, until 2019; MP for Bihar (Rajya Sabha), from 2019	27 May 2014	8 October 2020^{[†]}	6 years, 134 days	Lok Janshakti Party	Modi II	Narendra Modi
	Piyush Goyal (born 1964); MP for Maharashtra (Rajya Sabha)	9 October 2020	9 June 2024	3 years, 244 days	Bharatiya Janata Party	Modi II	Narendra Modi
	Pralhad Joshi (born 1962); MP for Dharwad	10 June 2024	Incumbent	2 years, 59 days	Bharatiya Janata Party	Modi III	Narendra Modi

== Ministers of State ==
Portrait	Minister (Birth-Death) Constituency	Term of office			Political party	Ministry	Prime Minister
Portrait	Minister (Birth-Death) Constituency	From	To	Period	Political party	Ministry	Prime Minister
Minister of State for Food and Agriculture
	Panjabrao Deshmukh (1898–1965); MP for Amravati; Minister of Cooperation from 25 Apr 1957	17 April 1957	10 April 1962	4 years, 358 days	Indian National Congress	Nehru III	Jawaharlal Nehru
	Ram Subhag Singh (1917–1980); MP for Bikramganj	8 May 1962	27 May 1964	2 years, 19 days	Indian National Congress	Nehru IV	Jawaharlal Nehru
	Alungal Mathai Thomas (1912–1981); MP for Ernakulam	21 November 1963	27 May 1964	188 days	Indian National Congress	Nehru IV	Jawaharlal Nehru
	Ram Subhag Singh (1917–1980); MP for Bikramganj	27 May 1964	9 June 1964	13 days	Indian National Congress	Nanda I	Gulzarilal Nanda
	Alungal Mathai Thomas (1912–1981); MP for Ernakulam	27 May 1964	9 June 1964	17 days	Indian National Congress	Nanda I	Gulzarilal Nanda
	Alungal Mathai Thomas (1912–1981); MP for Ernakulam	9 June 1964	13 June 1964	17 days	Indian National Congress	Shastri	Lal Bahadur Shastri
Minister of State for Food, Agriculture, Community Development and Cooperation
	Panampilly Govinda Menon (1906–1970); MP for Mukundapuram	24 January 1966	13 March 1967	1 year, 48 days	Indian National Congress	Indira I	Indira Gandhi
	Annasaheb Shinde (1922–1993); MP for Kopargaon	13 March 1967	18 March 1971	4 years, 5 days	Indian National Congress	Indira II	Indira Gandhi
	M. S. Gurupadaswamy (1924–2011); Rajya Sabha MP for Uttar Pradesh	5 June 1967	17 October 1969	2 years, 134 days	Indian National Congress	Indira II	Indira Gandhi
	Annasaheb Shinde (1922–1993); MP for Kopargaon	18 March 1971	2 May 1971	45 days	Indian National Congress	Indira III	Indira Gandhi
Minister of State for Industry and Civil Supplies
	Anant Sharma (1919–1988); Rajya Sabha MP for Bihar	10 October 1974	9 August 1976	1 year, 304 days	Indian National Congress (R)	Indira III	Indira Gandhi
	Buddha Priya Maurya (1926–2004); MP for Hapur	10 October 1974	9 August 1976	1 year, 304 days	Indian National Congress (R)	Indira III	Indira Gandhi
	A. C. George; MP for Mukundapuram	10 October 1974	9 August 1976	1 year, 304 days	Indian National Congress (R)	Indira III	Indira Gandhi
Minister of State for Civil Supplies and Cooperation
	A. C. George; MP for Mukundapuram	9 August 1976	24 March 1977	227 days	Indian National Congress (R)	Indira III	Indira Gandhi
	Arif Beg (1935–2016); MP for Bhopal	14 August 1977	28 July 1979	1 year, 348 days	Janata Party	Desai	Morarji Desai
	Krishna Kumar Goyal (1932–2013); MP for Kota	14 August 1977	28 July 1979	1 year, 348 days	Janata Party	Desai	Morarji Desai
Minister of State for Commerce and Civil Supplies
	Henry Austin (1920–2008); MP for Ernakulam	30 July 1979	14 January 1980	349 days	Indian National Congress (U)	Charan	Charan Singh
Minister of State for Food and Civil Supplies
	Ajit Kumar Panja (1936–2008); MP for Calcutta North East	19 February 1986	22 October 1986	245 days	Indian National Congress	Rajiv II	Rajiv Gandhi
	Ghulam Nabi Azad (born 1949); MP for Washim	22 October 1986	7 September 1987	320 days	Indian National Congress	Rajiv II	Rajiv Gandhi
	Ram Pujan Patel (1940–2021); MP for Phulpur	23 April 1990	10 November 1990	201 days	Janata Dal	Vishwanath	Vishwanath Pratap Singh
	Sarwar Hussain (born 1949); MP for Bulandshahr	21 November 1990	20 February 1991	91 days	Samajwadi Janata Party (Rashtriya)	Chandra Shekhar	Chandra Shekhar
Minister of State for Civil Supplies, Consumer Affairs and Public Distribution
	Kamaluddin Ahmed (1930–2018); MP for Hanamkonda	21 June 1991	29 September 1994	3 years, 100 days	Indian National Congress	Rao	P. V. Narasimha Rao
	Krishna Sahi (born 1931); MP for Begusarai; Minister of State, Civil Supplies from 19 Sep 1995	15 September 1995	16 May 1996	244 days	Indian National Congress	Rao	P. V. Narasimha Rao
	Venod Sharma (born 1948); MP for Haryana (Rajya Sabha); Minister of State, Consumer Affairs and Public Distribution System from 19 Sep 1995	15 September 1995	16 May 1996	244 days	Indian National Congress	Rao	P. V. Narasimha Rao
Minister of State for Food and Consumer Affairs
	Satyapal Singh Yadav (born 1942); MP for Shahjahanpur	19 March 1998	13 October 1999	1 year, 208 days	Bharatiya Janata Party	Vajpayee II	Atal Bihari Vajpayee
Minister of State for Consumer Affairs and Public Distribution
	V. Sreenivasa Prasad (1947–2024); MP for Chamarajanagar	13 October 1999	17 July 2000	278 days	Samata Party	Vajpayee III	Atal Bihari Vajpayee
	Sriram Chauhan (born 1953); MP for Basti	22 November 1999	17 July 2000	238 days	Bharatiya Janata Party	Vajpayee III	Atal Bihari Vajpayee
Minister of State for Consumer Affairs, Food and Public Distribution
	V. Sreenivasa Prasad (1947–2024); MP for Chamarajanagar	17 July 2000	6 March 2004	3 years, 233 days	Janata Dal (United)	Vajpayee III	Atal Bihari Vajpayee
	Sriram Chauhan (born 1953); MP for Basti	17 July 2000	1 September 2001	1 year, 46 days	Bharatiya Janata Party	Vajpayee III	Atal Bihari Vajpayee
	Ashok Kumar Pradhan (born 1953); MP for Khurja	1 September 2001	1 July 2002	303 days	Bharatiya Janata Party	Vajpayee III	Atal Bihari Vajpayee
	U. V. Krishnam Raju (1940–2022); MP for Narasapuram	1 July 2002	29 January 2003	212 days	Bharatiya Janata Party	Vajpayee III	Atal Bihari Vajpayee
	Subhash Maharia (born 1957); MP for Sikar	29 January 2003	22 May 2004	1 year, 114 days	Bharatiya Janata Party	Vajpayee III	Atal Bihari Vajpayee
	Kantilal Bhuria (born 1950); MP for Ratlam	23 May 2004	22 May 2009	4 years, 364 days	Indian National Congress	Manmohan I	Manmohan Singh
	Akhilesh Prasad Singh (born 1962); MP for Motihari	23 May 2004	22 May 2009	4 years, 364 days	Rashtriya Janata Dal	Manmohan I	Manmohan Singh
	Mohammed Taslimuddin (1943–2017); MP for Kishanganj	25 May 2004	22 May 2009	4 years, 362 days	Rashtriya Janata Dal	Manmohan I	Manmohan Singh
	K. V. Thomas (born 1946); MP for Ernakulam	29 May 2009	19 January 2011	2 years, 51 days	Indian National Congress	Manmohan II	Manmohan Singh
	Raosaheb Danve (born 1955); MP for Jalna	27 May 2014	6 March 2015	283 days	Bharatiya Janata Party	Modi I	Narendra Modi
	C. R. Chaudhary (born 1948); MP for Nagaur	5 July 2016	30 May 2019	2 years, 329 days	Bharatiya Janata Party	Modi I	Narendra Modi
	Raosaheb Danve (born 1955); MP for Jalna	31 May 2019	7 July 2021	2 years, 37 days	Bharatiya Janata Party	Modi II	Narendra Modi
	Ashwini Kumar Choubey (born 1953); MP for Buxar	7 July 2021	9 June 2024	2 years, 339 days	Bharatiya Janata Party	Modi II	Narendra Modi
	Niranjan Jyoti (born 1967); MP for Fatehpur	7 July 2021	9 June 2024	2 years, 339 days	Bharatiya Janata Party	Modi II	Narendra Modi
	B. L. Verma (born 1961); MP for Uttar Pradesh (Rajya Sabha)	10 June 2024	Incumbent	2 years, 59 days	Bharatiya Janata Party	Modi III	Narendra Modi
	Nimuben Bambhaniya (born 1966); MP for Bhavnagar	10 June 2024	Incumbent	2 years, 59 days	Bharatiya Janata Party	Modi III	Narendra Modi

== See also ==
- Department of Co-operation, Food and Consumer Protection (Tamil Nadu)
- Ministry of Co-operation
