= Ratnamala Savanur =

Indian politician

Ratnamala Dhareshwar Savanur (her surname is sometimes spelled Savanoor; born 1950) is an Indian politician formerly affiliated to the Janata Dal and now Janata Dal (Secular). She was a member of the 11th Lok Sabha and served as the Minister of State for Planning and Implementation in Gujral ministry.

== Early life ==
Savanur was born on 3 December 1950 in Belgaum district of Karnataka. She is the daughter of Shri Gopalrao Masaji Pol. She holds a Bachelor of Law degree from a law college in Kolhapur.

== Career ==
Savanur was formerly a member of the Janata Dal. During the 1996 Indian general election, she contest against B. Shankaranand of the Indian National Congress (INC) from Chikkodi seat reserved for scheduled castes and defeated him by a margin of 1,12,759 votes. Shankaranand had previously won the constituency nine consecutive times. Savanur was appointed a Minister of State for Planning and Implementation in prime minister I.K. Gujral's council of ministers. However, Janata Dal fielded another candidate from Chikkodi during the 1998 general election.

Savanur was, for a brief period, a member of the INC, before joining Janata Dal (Secular) in March 2004. Ahead of the 2008 Karnataka Legislative Assembly election, she joined the Bharatiya Janata Party.

== Personal life ==
She married Dhareshwar Savanoor on 12 May 1974 and has two daughters with him.
