= Central Water Commission =

Indian government agency

CENTRAL WATER COMMISSION
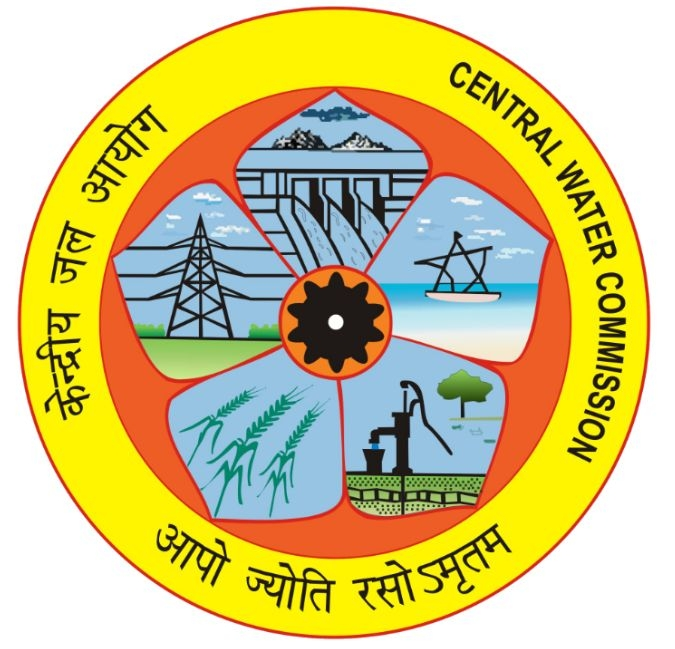
- Abbreviation: CWC
- Formation: 1945
- Headquarters: Sewa Bhawan, R.K. Puram, New Delhi
- Location: INDIA
- Ministers Responsible: Chandrakant Raghunath Patil, Union Minister of Jal Shakti V. Somanna, Minister of State Raj Bhushan Choudhary, Minister of State
- Chairman: Atul Jain
- Duties: Premier Technical Organization of India in the field of Water Resources
- Mode of Selection: Indian Engineering Services Examination for Group 'A' Post Staff Selection Commission JE Exam for Group 'B' Post
- Website: http://www.cwc.gov.in

Central Water Commission (CWC) is a technical organization of India in the field of water resources. It is presently functioning as an attached office of the Department of Water Resources, River Development and Ganga Rejuvenation, Ministry of Jal Shakti, Government of India. The commission is entrusted with the general responsibilities of initiating, coordinating and furthering in consultation of the State Governments concerned, schemes for control, conservation and utilization of water resources throughout the country, for purpose of flood control, irrigation, navigation, drinking water supply and hydro power development. It also undertakes the investigations, construction and execution of any such schemes as required.

CWC is headed by a chairman, with the status of Ex-Officio Secretary to the Government of India. The work of the commission is divided among three wings namely, Designs and Research (D&R) Wing, River Management (RM) Wing and Water Planning and Projects (WP&P) Wing. Each wing is placed under the charge of a full-time Member with the status of Ex-Officio Additional Secretary to the Government of India and comprising a number of organizations responsible for the disposal of tasks and duties falling within their assigned scope of functions.

== History ==
Central Water Commission (CWC) came into existence as “Central Waterways, Irrigation and Navigation Commission” (CWINC) in 1945 which was established on the advice of Dr. B. R. Ambedkar, Member (Labour) in the then Viceroy's Executive Council. The final proposal for establishment of CWINC was prepared by the then Department of Labour with the help of Dr. A.N. Khosla, Consulting Engineer to the Govt. of India for Waterways, Irrigation and Navigation. Dr. A.N. Khosla was subsequently appointed as founder Chairman of the CWINC. Thereafter, Govt. of India vide Ministry of Natural Resources and Scientific Research Resolution dated 21.04.1951 decided on grounds of economy and efficiency, to amalgamate the CWINC and Central Electricity Commission into Central Water and Power Commission (CW&PC). With the creation of the Ministry of Irrigation and Power in 1952, CW&PC became its attached office.

Following the bifurcation of the Ministry of Irrigation and Power in the year 1974 into Department of Power under the Ministry of Energy and Department of Irrigation under the Ministry of Agriculture and Irrigation, the CW&PC was also bifurcated and its water wing became the Central Water Commission (CWC) and its power wing became the Central Electricity Authority (CEA). Central Water Commission is presently functioning as an attached office of the Department of Water Resources, River Development and Ganga Rejuvenation, Ministry of Jal Shakti, Government of India.

== Functions of CWC ==
Following are the functional domains of CWC:

- Basin Planning and Management
- Appraisal of Water Resources Projects
- Establishing Project Hydrology
- Survey & Investigation of Water Resources Projects
- Civil & Structural Design of Water Resources Projects
- Hydro-Mechanical Design of Water Resources Projects
- Monitoring of Water Resources Projects
- Dam Safety
- Flood Forecasting/ Hydrological Observation
- River Management
- Inter-State/ International conflict resolution in Water related Disputes
- Monitoring the River Water Quality

== Regional offices ==
In order to achieve better management in the Water Resources Sector and to have better coordination with State Government departments, CWC has established 14 regional organisations, each headed by a Chief Engineer. The organisations with their location are as follows:

Sl.	Location	Organization
1	Bengaluru	Monitoring South Organization (MSO)
2	Bhopal	Narmada Basin Organization (NBO)
3	Bhubaneswar	Mahanadi and Eastern Rivers Organization (MERO)
4	Chandigarh	Indus Basin Organization (IBO)
5	Coimbatore	Cauvery and Southern Rivers Organization (CSRO)
6	Delhi	Yamuna Basin Organization (YBO)
7	Gandhi Nagar	Mahi and Tapi Basin Organization (MTBO)
8	Guwahati	Brahmaputra Basin Organization (BBO)
9	Hyderabad	Krishna and Godavari Basin Organization (KGBO)
10	Kolkata	Teesta and Bhagirathi Damodar Basin Organization (T&BDBO)
11	Lucknow	Upper Ganga Basin Organization (UGBO)
12	Nagpur	Monitoring Central Organization (MCO)
13	Patna	Lower Ganga Basin Organization (LGBO)
14	Shillong	Barak and Other Basin Organization (BOBO)

== Central Water Engineering Service (CWES) ==
Central Water Engineering Service (CWES) Group ‘A’ Service was formally constituted in the year 1965, though the cadre had been building since April, 1945 when Central Waterways, Irrigation and Navigation Commission (CWINC) was constituted. CWES is the only organized Group ‘A’ Service at central government dealing with water sector. CWES was mainly constituted with the objective of efficiently manning the various formations of the Government of India (GOI) dealing with water resources development.

CWES officers, belonging to Civil Engineering or Mechanical Engineering streams, are either directly recruited for the Group-A posts by the Union Public Service Commission (UPSC) on the basis of Engineering Services Examination (ESE) or by way of promotion of Group-B officers in the feeder grade.

National Water Academy (NWA), Pune, the in house training institute of Central Water Commission (CWC), conducts induction training program for the directly recruited CWES officers joining at the assistant director level. The promotee CWES officers also undergo an orientation course at NWA. These trainings expose CWES officers to various aspects/ issues of water sector and enable them with various techno-managerial tools to deal with various challenges in the sector. Besides, NWA also conducts Mandatory Cadre Training Programs, various types of trainings and capacity building programs for CWES officers at different levels throughout the year. CWES officers are also sent on foreign trainings on a regular basis.

CWES officers head important organisations under the Department of Water Resources, River Development & Ganga Rejuvenation (DoWR, RD & GR), Ministry of Jal Shakti. Majority of the CWES officers are posted in Central Water Commission (CWC), while a sizeable no. of posts of CWES are also encadered in other organizations. This includes encadered posts in DoWR, RD & GR, Central Electricity Authority (CEA), Ganga Flood Control Commission (GFCC), Farakka Barrage Project (FBP), Krishna River Management Board (KRMB), Godavari River Management Board (GRMB), Cauvery Water Management Authority (CWMA) etc.

Opportunities are also available for CWES officers to steer other organisations e.g. National Water Development Agency (NWDA), Central Water & Power Research Station (CWPRS), Central Soil & Material Research Station (CSMRS), National Institute of Hydrology (NIH), Upper Yamuna River Board (UYRB), etc. CWES officers are also deputed on foreign assignments of planning and execution of Water Resources Projects and other long and short term deputations in international institutions such as Asian Development Bank (ADB). In addition, CWES Gr.‘A’ officers avail opportunities of serving on important posts in other Govt. departments through Central Staffing Scheme(CSS).

== Designations and career progression ==
Positions and Designations held by CWES officers in their career are as below-

Junior Time Scale (JTS)	Assistant Director / Assistant Executive Engineer
Senior Time Scale (STS)	Deputy Director/ Executive Engineer/ Deputy Commissioner (Equivalent to Under Secretary to GOI)
Non Functional Second Grade (NFSG)	Deputy Director/ Executive Engineer/ Deputy Commissioner (Equivalent to Deputy Secretary to GOl)
Junior Administrative Grade (JAG)	Director/ Superintending Engineer/ Senior Joint Commissioner (Equivalent to Director to GOI)
Senior Administrative Grade (SAG)	Chief Engineer/ Commissioner (Equivalent to Joint Secretary to GOI)
Higher Administrative Grade (HAG)	Member, CWC/ Chairman, GFCC/KRMB/GRMB (Equivalent to Additional Secretary to GOI)
Apex Scale	Chairman, CWC (Equivalent to Secretary to GOI)

According to prevalent recruitment rules for CWES cadre, an officer is expected to put in minimum 4 years of service at the Junior Time Scale (JTS) level, and nine years at Senior Time Scale (STS) level before his or her promotion to the Junior Administrative Grade (JAG) level. During their tenure at JTS and STS level, the officers develop requisite competencies for bigger responsibilities at JAG level. At JAG and above, the officers are required to deliver well defined output. A CWES officer may further be promoted to Senior Administrative Grade (SAG) level and Higher Administrative Grade (HAG) level after putting in a minimum of 17 years and 25 years of Gr. A service respectively subject to other terms and conditions.
