= Ministry of Jal Shakti =

Government ministry of India

- Branch of Government of India

- Ministry of Jal Shakti

Agency overview
- Formed: May 2019
- Jurisdiction: Government of India
- Annual budget: ₹97,278 crore (US$10 billion) (2023-24 est)
- Ministers responsible: C. R. Patil; V. Somanna, Minister of State; Raj Bhushan Choudhary, Minister of State
- Website: jalshakti.gov.in

The Ministry of Jal Shakti (lit. 'Ministry of Water Resources') is a ministry under the Government of India which was formed in May 2019 under the second Modi ministry. This was formed by merging of two ministries; the Ministry of Water Resources, River Development and Ganga Rejuvenation and the Ministry of Drinking Water and Sanitation.

The formation of this ministry reflects India's seriousness towards the mounting water challenges the country has been facing over the past few decades. WAPCOS is an Indian multinational government undertaking and consultancy firm wholly owned by Ministry of Jal Shakti, Government of India.

== Functions ==
The ministry was incorporated with an aim to clean the river Ganges. They would also encompass any international or national disputes between inter-state water bodies and the rivers which are shared by India along with other neighboring countries. A special project "Namami Gange" project has been launched to clean Ganga and its tributaries to provide safe drinking water to people of the country. The ministry has also launched its special campaigns on social so that citizens of the country become aware of water conservation.

== Organisation of Ministry ==
Under this ministry two departments work, these departments and their offices are as follow:

=== Department of Water Resources, River Development and Ganga Rejuvenation ===
==== Wings ====
- Administration, International Cooperation & Ground Water (All matters pertaining to Administration, Establishment, Coordination, Organization & Method, IEC, e-Governance, Parliamentary Matters, International Cooperation,Ground Water and Vigilance).
- Brahmaputra & Barak
- Command Area Development and Water Management
- Economic Advisory
- Flood Management
- Finance
- Indus
- Minor Irrigation Statistics
- National Water Mission
- Penisular River
- River Development & Public Policy
- Dam Rehabilitation, Improvement Programme and State Projects.

==== Attached Subordinate offices/ Societies ====
- National Mission for Clean Ganga (NMCG) or Namami Gange Programme
- Central Water Commission (CWC)
- Central Ground Water Board (CGWB)
- National Water Development Agency (NWDA)
- National River Conservation Directorate (NRCD)
- Brahmaputra Board

==== Research/Training Institutions ====
- National Water Informatics Centre (NWIC)
- Central Soil And Materials Research Station (CSMRS)
- National Institute Of Hydrology (NIH)
- Central Water And Power Research Station (CWPRS)
- North Eastern Regional Institute Of Water And Land Management (NERIWALM)

==== PSUs ====
- Water And Power Consultancy Services Ltd (WAPCOS)
- National Projects Construction Corporation Limited (NPCC)

==== Water Regulatory Organisations ====
- Narmada Control Authority (NCA)
- Farakka Barrage Project (FBP)
- Upper Yamuna River Board (UYRB)
- Ganga Flood Control Commission (GFCC)
- Bansagar Control Board (BCB)
- Betwa River Board (BRB)
- Tungabhadra Board (TB)
- Godavari River Management Board
- Krishna River Management Board (KRMB)
- Cauvery Water Management Authority (CWMA)
- National Dam Safety Authority
- Mahadayi Prawah and Ken Betwa Link Project Authority.

==== Irrigation Project Funded by MoJS ====
- Polavaram Project Authority

==== Water Dispute Tribunals ====
- Mahadayi Water Disputes Tribunal
- Ravi And Beas Water Dispute Tribunal
- Krishna Water Dispute Tribunal
- Vansadhara Water Dispute Tribunal

The Ministry of Water Resources, River Development and Ganga Rejuvenation was the apex body for formulation and administration of rules and regulations relating to the development and regulation of the water resources in India. The Ministry was formed in January 1985 following the bifurcation of the then Ministry of Irrigation and Power, when the Department of Irrigation was re-constituted as the Ministry of Water Resources. In July 2014, the Ministry was renamed to "Ministry of Water Resources, River Development & Ganga Rejuvenation", making it the National Ganga River Basin Authority for conservation, development, management, and abatement of pollution in the river Ganges and its tributaries (Note: Ministry of National Resources and Scientific Research (1951-52) Ministry of Irrigation and Power (1952-74; 1985) Ministry of Agriculture and Irrigation (1974-80) Ministry of Energy and Irrigation (1980) Ministry of Irrigation (1980-85)). In May 2019, this ministry was merged with the Ministry of Drinking Water and Sanitation to form the Ministry of Jal Shakti.

=== Department of Drinking Water and Sanitation ===
In 1999, the Department of Drinking Water Supply (DDWS) was formed under Ministry of Rural Development, for focused attention on drinking water and sanitation. Later it was renamed as Department of Drinking Water and Sanitation in 2010.

The department became the Ministry of Drinking Water and Sanitation in 2011, keeping in view the extreme importance given to the sector by the United Progressive Alliance government. From May 2019, the ministry has been merged with the Ministry of Jal Shakti. The ministry was responsible for the implementation of Swachh Bharat Abhiyan in rural India. It got 8 million toilets constructed surpassing the target of 6 million toilets for the year 2015–16.

This department promotes many sanitation missions and programs for public, the main sanitation programs are:

- Jal Jeevan Mission
- Swachh Bharat Mission
- Swachh Survekshan Grameen

==== Agencies ====
1. Dr. Syama Prasad Mookerjee National Institute of Water and Sanitation

==== Notable decisions ====
The ministry requested various governmental departments to avoid the usage of plastic bottles to provide drinking water during governmental meetings etc., and instead, to make arrangements for providing drinking water that do not result in the generation of plastic waste.

== Cabinet Ministers ==
- Note: I/C – Independent Charge

=== Minister of Irrigation/Water Resources (1952–1974; 1980–2019) ===
Portrait	Minister (Birth-Death) Constituency	Term of office			Political party	Ministry	Prime Minister
Portrait	Minister (Birth-Death) Constituency	From	To	Period	Political party	Ministry	Prime Minister
Minister of Irrigation and Power
	Gulzarilal Nanda (1898–1998); MP for Sabarkantha	6 June 1952	17 April 1957	4 years, 315 days	Indian National Congress	Nehru II	Jawaharlal Nehru
	S. K. Patil (1898–1981); MP for Mumbai South	17 April 1957	2 April 1958	350 days	Indian National Congress	Nehru III	Jawaharlal Nehru
	Hafiz Mohamad Ibrahim (1889–1968); MP for Uttar Pradesh (Rajya Sabha)	2 April 1958	10 April 1962	5 years, 85 days	Indian National Congress	Nehru III	Jawaharlal Nehru
	Hafiz Mohamad Ibrahim (1889–1968); MP for Uttar Pradesh (Rajya Sabha)	10 April 1962	26 June 1963	5 years, 85 days	Indian National Congress	Nehru IV	Jawaharlal Nehru
	O. V. Alagesan (1911–1992); MP for Chengalpattu (Minister of State)	26 June 1963	19 July 1963	23 days	Indian National Congress	Nehru IV	Jawaharlal Nehru
	Kanuri Lakshmana Rao (1902–1986); MP for Vijayawada (Minister of State)	19 July 1963	27 May 1964	326 days	Indian National Congress	Nehru IV	Jawaharlal Nehru
	Kanuri Lakshmana Rao (1902–1986); MP for Vijayawada (Minister of State)	27 May 1964	9 June 1964	326 days	Indian National Congress	Nanda I	Gulzarilal Nanda
	H. C. Dasappa (1894–1964); MP for Bangalore	9 June 1964	19 July 1964	40 days	Indian National Congress	Shastri	Lal Bahadur Shastri
	Kanuri Lakshmana Rao (1902–1986); MP for Vijayawada (Minister of State)	19 July 1964	11 January 1966	1 year, 189 days	Indian National Congress	Shastri	Lal Bahadur Shastri
	Kanuri Lakshmana Rao (1902–1986); MP for Vijayawada (Minister of State)	11 January 1966	24 January 1966	1 year, 189 days	Indian National Congress	Nanda II	Gulzarilal Nanda
	Fakhruddin Ali Ahmed (1905–1977); MP for Barpeta	24 January 1966	13 November 1966	293 days	Indian National Congress	Indira I	Indira Gandhi
	Kanuri Lakshmana Rao (1902–1986); MP for Vijayawada (Minister of State)	13 November 1966	13 March 1967	6 years, 361 days	Indian National Congress	Indira I	Indira Gandhi
	Kanuri Lakshmana Rao (1902–1986); MP for Vijayawada (Minister of State)	13 March 1967	18 March 1971	6 years, 361 days	Indian National Congress	Indira II	Indira Gandhi
	Kanuri Lakshmana Rao (1902–1986); MP for Vijayawada (Minister of State)	18 March 1971	9 November 1973	6 years, 361 days	Indian National Congress (R)	Indira II	Indira Gandhi
	K. C. Pant (1931–2012); MP for Nainital (Minister of State)	9 November 1973	10 October 1974	335 days	Indian National Congress (R)	Indira II	Indira Gandhi
Merged with Ministry of Agriculture and Irrigation during this interval
Minister of Irrigation
	A. B. A. Ghani Khan Choudhury (1927–2006); MP for Malda	16 January 1980	8 June 1980	144 days	Indian National Congress	Indira IV	Indira Gandhi
	Kedar Pandey (1920–1982); MP for Bettiah	8 June 1980	12 November 1980	157 days	Indian National Congress	Indira IV	Indira Gandhi
	Rao Birender Singh (1921–2000); MP for Mahendragarh	12 November 1980	15 January 1982	1 year, 64 days	Indian National Congress	Indira IV	Indira Gandhi
	Kedar Pandey (1920–1982); MP for Bettiah	15 January 1982	29 January 1983	1 year, 14 days	Indian National Congress	Indira IV	Indira Gandhi
	Ram Niwas Mirdha (1924–2010); MP for Rajasthan (Rajya Sabha) (Minister of State, I/C)	29 January 1983	2 August 1984	1 year, 186 days	Indian National Congress	Indira IV	Indira Gandhi
	Prakash Chandra Sethi (1919–1996); MP for Indore	2 August 1984	31 October 1984	90 days	Indian National Congress	Indira IV	Indira Gandhi
	C. K. Jaffer Sharief (1933–2018); MP for Bangalore North (Minister of State, I/C)	4 November 1984	31 December 1984	57 days	Indian National Congress	Rajiv I	Rajiv Gandhi
	B. Shankaranand (1925–2009); MP for Chikkodi	31 December 1984	25 September 1985	268 days	Indian National Congress	Rajiv II	Rajiv Gandhi
Minister of Water Resources
	B. Shankaranand (1925–2009); MP for Chikkodi	25 September 1985	22 August 1987	1 year, 331 days	Indian National Congress	Rajiv II	Rajiv Gandhi
	Rajiv Gandhi (1944–1991); MP for Amethi (Prime Minister)	22 August 1987	10 November 1987	19 days	Indian National Congress	Rajiv II	Rajiv Gandhi
	Ram Niwas Mirdha (1924–2010); MP for Rajasthan (Rajya Sabha) (Minister of State, I/C)	10 November 1987	14 February 1988	96 days	Indian National Congress	Rajiv II	Rajiv Gandhi
	Dinesh Singh (1925–1995); MP for Pratapgarh	14 February 1988	25 June 1988	132 days	Indian National Congress	Rajiv II	Rajiv Gandhi
	B. Shankaranand (1925–2009); MP for Chikkodi	25 June 1988	4 July 1989	1 year, 9 days	Indian National Congress	Rajiv II	Rajiv Gandhi
	M. M. Jacob (1926–2018); MP for Kerala (Rajya Sabha) (Minister of State, I/C)	4 July 1989	2 December 1989	151 days	Indian National Congress	Rajiv II	Rajiv Gandhi
	Manubhai Kotadia (1936–2003); MP for Amreli (Minister of State, I/C until 5 Nov 1990)	6 December 1989	5 November 1990	334 days	Janata Dal	V. P. Singh	V. P. Singh
	Manubhai Kotadia (1936–2003); MP for Amreli (Minister of State, I/C until 5 Nov 1990)	21 November 1990	26 April 1991	156 days	Samajwadi Janata Party (Rashtriya)	Chandra Shekhar	Chandra Shekhar
	Chandra Shekhar (1927–2007); MP for Ballia (Prime Minister)	26 April 1991	21 June 1991	56 days	Samajwadi Janata Party (Rashtriya)	Chandra Shekhar	Chandra Shekhar
	Vidya Charan Shukla (1929–2013); MP for Raipur	21 June 1991	17 January 1996	4 years, 210 days	Indian National Congress	Rao	P. V. Narasimha Rao
	P. V. Narasimha Rao (1921–2004); MP for Nandyal (Prime Minister)	17 January 1996	7 February 1996	21 days	Indian National Congress	Rao	P. V. Narasimha Rao
	A. R. Antulay (1929–2014); MP for Kolaba	7 February 1996	16 May 1996	99 days	Indian National Congress	Rao	P. V. Narasimha Rao
	Atal Bihari Vajpayee (1924–2018); MP for Lucknow (Prime Minister)	16 May 1996	1 June 1996	16 days	Bharatiya Janata Party	Vajpayee I	Atal Bihari Vajpayee
	H. D. Deve Gowda (born 1933); Unelected (Prime Minister)	1 June 1996	29 June 1996	28 days	Janata Dal	Deve Gowda	H. D. Deve Gowda
	Janeshwar Mishra (1933–2010); MP for Uttar Pradesh (Rajya Sabha)	29 June 1996	21 April 1997	345 days	Samajwadi Party	Deve Gowda	H. D. Deve Gowda
	Janeshwar Mishra (1933–2010); MP for Uttar Pradesh (Rajya Sabha)	21 April 1997	9 June 1997	345 days	Samajwadi Party	Gujral	Inder Kumar Gujral
	Sis Ram Ola (1927–2013); MP for Jhunjhunu (Minister of State, I/C)	9 June 1997	19 March 1998	283 days	All India Indira Congress (Tiwari)	Gujral	Inder Kumar Gujral
	Atal Bihari Vajpayee (1924–2018); MP for Lucknow (Prime Minister)	19 March 1998	13 October 1999	1 year, 208 days	Bharatiya Janata Party	Vajpayee II	Atal Bihari Vajpayee
	Pramod Mahajan (1949–2006); MP for Maharashtra (Rajya Sabha)	13 October 1999	22 November 1999	40 days	Bharatiya Janata Party	Vajpayee III	Atal Bihari Vajpayee
	C. P. Thakur (born 1931); MP for Patna	22 November 1999	27 May 2000	187 days	Bharatiya Janata Party	Vajpayee III	Atal Bihari Vajpayee
	Arjun Charan Sethi (1941–2020); MP for Bhadrak	27 May 2000	22 May 2004	3 years, 361 days	Biju Janata Dal	Vajpayee III	Atal Bihari Vajpayee
	Priya Ranjan Dasmunsi (1945–2017); MP for Raiganj	23 May 2004	18 November 2005	1 year, 179 days	Indian National Congress	Manmohan I	Manmohan Singh
	Santosh Mohan Dev (1934–2017); MP for Silchar (Minister of State, I/C)	18 November 2005	29 January 2006	72 days	Indian National Congress	Manmohan I	Manmohan Singh
	Saifuddin Soz (born 1937); MP for Jammu and Kashmir (Rajya Sabha)	29 January 2006	22 May 2009	3 years, 113 days	Indian National Congress	Manmohan I	Manmohan Singh
	Meira Kumar (born 1945); MP for Sasaram	28 May 2009	31 May 2009	3 days	Indian National Congress	Manmohan II	Manmohan Singh
	Manmohan Singh (1932–2024); MP for Assam (Rajya Sabha) (Prime Minister)	31 May 2009	14 June 2009	14 days	Indian National Congress	Manmohan II	Manmohan Singh
	Pawan Kumar Bansal (born 1948); MP for Chandigarh	14 June 2009	19 January 2011	1 year, 219 days	Indian National Congress	Manmohan II	Manmohan Singh
	Salman Khurshid (born 1953); MP for Farrukhabad	19 January 2011	12 July 2011	174 days	Indian National Congress	Manmohan II	Manmohan Singh
	Pawan Kumar Bansal (born 1948); MP for Chandigarh	12 July 2011	28 October 2012	1 year, 108 days	Indian National Congress	Manmohan II	Manmohan Singh
	Harish Rawat (born 1948); MP for Haridwar	28 October 2012	1 February 2014	1 year, 96 days	Indian National Congress	Manmohan II	Manmohan Singh
	Ghulam Nabi Azad (born 1949); MP for Jammu and Kashmir (Rajya Sabha)	1 February 2014	26 May 2014	114 days	Indian National Congress	Manmohan II	Manmohan Singh
Minister of Water Resources, River Development and Ganga Rejuvenation
	Uma Bharti (born 1959); MP for Jhansi	27 May 2014	3 September 2017	3 years, 99 days	Bharatiya Janata Party	Modi I	Narendra Modi
	Nitin Gadkari (born 1957); MP for Nagpur	3 September 2017	30 May 2019	1 year, 269 days	Bharatiya Janata Party	Modi I	Narendra Modi
Merged into the Ministry of Jal Shakti

=== Minister of Drinking Water and Sanitation (2011–2019) ===
Portrait	Minister (Birth-Death) Constituency	Term of office			Political party	Ministry	Prime Minister
Portrait	Minister (Birth-Death) Constituency	From	To	Period	Political party	Ministry	Prime Minister
	Gurudas Kamat (1954–2018); MP for Mumbai North West (Minister of State, I/C)	12 July 2011	13 July 2011	1 day	Indian National Congress	Manmohan II	Manmohan Singh
	Jairam Ramesh (born 1954); MP for Andhra Pradesh (Rajya Sabha)	13 July 2011	28 October 2012	1 year, 107 days	Indian National Congress	Manmohan II	Manmohan Singh
	Bharatsinh Solanki (born 1953); MP for Anand (Minister of State, I/C)	28 October 2012	26 May 2014	1 year, 210 days	Indian National Congress	Manmohan II	Manmohan Singh
	Gopinath Munde (1949–2014); MP for Beed	27 May 2014	3 June 2014^{[†]}	7 days	Bharatiya Janata Party	Modi I	Narendra Modi
	Nitin Gadkari (born 1957); MP for Nagpur	4 June 2014	9 November 2014	158 days	Bharatiya Janata Party	Modi I	Narendra Modi
	Birender Singh (born 1946); MP for Haryana (Rajya Sabha)	9 November 2014	5 July 2016	1 year, 239 days	Bharatiya Janata Party	Modi I	Narendra Modi
	Narendra Singh Tomar (born 1957); MP for Gwalior	5 July 2016	3 September 2017	1 year, 60 days	Bharatiya Janata Party	Modi I	Narendra Modi
	Uma Bharti (born 1959); MP for Jhansi	3 September 2017	30 May 2019	1 year, 269 days	Bharatiya Janata Party	Modi I	Narendra Modi
Merged into the Ministry of Jal Shakti

=== Minister of Jal Shakti (2019–present) ===
Portrait	Minister (Birth-Death) Constituency	Term of office			Political party	Ministry	Prime Minister
Portrait	Minister (Birth-Death) Constituency	From	To	Period	Political party	Ministry	Prime Minister
	Gajendra Singh Shekhawat (born 1967); MP for Jodhpur	31 May 2019	9 June 2024	5 years, 9 days	Bharatiya Janata Party	Modi II	Narendra Modi
	Chandrakant Raghunath Patil (born 1955); MP for Navsari	10 June 2024	Incumbent	2 years, 159 days	Bharatiya Janata Party	Modi III	Narendra Modi

== Ministers of State ==
=== Minister of State for Irrigation/Water Resources (1952–1974; 1980–2019) ===
Portrait	Minister (Birth-Death) Constituency	Term of office			Political party	Ministry	Prime Minister
Portrait	Minister (Birth-Death) Constituency	From	To	Period	Political party	Ministry	Prime Minister
Minister of State for Irrigation and Power
	O. V. Alagesan (1911–1992); MP for Chengalpattu	8 May 1962	19 July 1963	1 year, 72 days	Indian National Congress	Nehru IV	Jawaharlal Nehru
	Kanuri Lakshmana Rao (1902–1986); MP for Vijayawada	9 June 1964	19 July 1964	40 days	Indian National Congress	Shastri	Lal Bahadur Shastri
	Kanuri Lakshmana Rao (1902–1986); MP for Vijayawada	24 January 1966	13 November 1966	293 days	Indian National Congress	Indira I	Indira Gandhi
Merged with Ministry of Agriculture and Irrigation during this interval
Minister of State for Irrigation
	Ziaur Rahman Ansari (1925–1992); MP for Unnao	19 January 1980	29 January 1983	3 years, 10 days	Indian National Congress	Indira IV	Indira Gandhi
	Harinath Mishra; MP for Darbhanga	2 August 1984	31 October 1984	90 days	Indian National Congress	Indira IV	Indira Gandhi
Minister of State for Water Resources
	Krishna Sahi (born 1931); MP for Begusarai	14 February 1988	4 July 1989	1 year, 140 days	Indian National Congress	Rajiv II	Rajiv Gandhi
	Prem Khandu Thungan (born 1946); MP for Arunachal West	19 January 1993	10 February 1995	2 years, 22 days	Indian National Congress	Rao	P. V. Narasimha Rao
	P. V. Rangayya Naidu (born 1933); MP for Khammam	10 February 1995	16 May 1996	1 year, 96 days	Indian National Congress	Rao	P. V. Narasimha Rao
	Sompal Shastri (born 1942); MP for Baghpat	3 February 1999	13 October 1999	252 days	Bharatiya Janata Party	Vajpayee II	Atal Bihari Vajpayee
	Bijoya Chakravarty (born 1939); MP for Gauhati	13 October 1999	22 May 2004	4 years, 222 days	Bharatiya Janata Party	Vajpayee III	Atal Bihari Vajpayee
	Jay Prakash Narayan Yadav (born 1954); MP for Munger	23 May 2004	6 November 2005	1 year, 167 days	Rashtriya Janata Dal	Manmohan I	Manmohan Singh
	Jay Prakash Narayan Yadav (born 1954); MP for Munger	24 October 2006	22 May 2009	2 years, 210 days	Rashtriya Janata Dal	Manmohan I	Manmohan Singh
	Vincent Pala (born 1968); MP for Shillong	28 May 2009	28 October 2012	3 years, 153 days	Indian National Congress	Manmohan II	Manmohan Singh
Minister of State for Water Resources, River Development and Ganga Rejuvenation
	Santosh Kumar Gangwar (born 1948); MP for Bareilly	27 May 2014	9 November 2014	166 days	Bharatiya Janata Party	Modi I	Narendra Modi
	Sanwar Lal Jat (1955–2017); MP for Ajmer	9 November 2014	5 July 2016	1 year, 239 days	Bharatiya Janata Party	Modi I	Narendra Modi
	Vijay Goel (born 1954); MP for Rajasthan (Rajya Sabha)	5 July 2016	3 September 2017	1 year, 60 days	Bharatiya Janata Party	Modi I	Narendra Modi
	Sanjeev Balyan (born 1972); MP for Muzaffarnagar	5 July 2016	3 September 2017	1 year, 60 days	Bharatiya Janata Party	Modi I	Narendra Modi
	Arjun Ram Meghwal (born 1953); MP for Bikaner	3 September 2017	30 May 2019	1 year, 269 days	Bharatiya Janata Party	Modi I	Narendra Modi
	Satya Pal Singh (born 1955); MP for Baghpat	3 September 2017	30 May 2019	1 year, 269 days	Bharatiya Janata Party	Modi I	Narendra Modi
Merged into the Ministry of Jal Shakti

=== Minister of State for Drinking Water and Sanitation (2011–2019) ===
Portrait	Minister (Birth-Death) Constituency	Term of office			Political party	Ministry	Prime Minister
Portrait	Minister (Birth-Death) Constituency	From	To	Period	Political party	Ministry	Prime Minister
	Upendra Kushwaha (born 1960); MP for Karakat	26 May 2014	9 November 2014	167 days	Rashtriya Lok Samta Party	Modi I	Narendra Modi
	Ram Kripal Yadav (born 1957); MP for Pataliputra	9 November 2014	5 July 2016	1 year, 239 days	Bharatiya Janata Party	Modi I	Narendra Modi
	Ramesh Jigajinagi (born 1952); MP for Bijapur	5 July 2016	30 May 2019	2 years, 329 days	Bharatiya Janata Party	Modi I	Narendra Modi
	S. S. Ahluwalia (born 1951); MP for Darjeeling	3 September 2017	14 May 2018	253 days	Bharatiya Janata Party	Modi I	Narendra Modi
Merged into the Ministry of Jal Shakti

=== Minister of State for Jal Shakti (2019–present) ===
Portrait	Minister (Birth-Death) Constituency	Term of office			Political party	Ministry	Prime Minister
Portrait	Minister (Birth-Death) Constituency	From	To	Period	Political party	Ministry	Prime Minister
	Rattan Lal Kataria (1951–2023); MP for Ambala	31 May 2019	7 July 2021	2 years, 37 days	Bharatiya Janata Party	Modi II	Narendra Modi
	Prahlad Singh Patel (born 1960); MP for Damoh	7 July 2021	7 December 2023	2 years, 153 days	Bharatiya Janata Party	Modi II	Narendra Modi
	Bishweswar Tudu (born 1965); MP for Mayurbhanj	7 July 2021	9 June 2024	2 years, 338 days	Bharatiya Janata Party	Modi II	Narendra Modi
	Rajeev Chandrasekhar (born 1964); Rajya Sabha MP for Karnataka	7 December 2023	9 June 2024	185 days	Bharatiya Janata Party	Modi II	Narendra Modi
	V. Somanna (born 1950); MP for Tumkur	10 June 2024	Incumbent	2 years, 159 days	Bharatiya Janata Party	Modi III	Narendra Modi
	Raj Bhushan Choudhary (born 1944); MP for Muzaffarpur	10 June 2024	Incumbent	2 years, 159 days	Bharatiya Janata Party	Modi III	Narendra Modi

== Deputy Ministers ==
=== Water Resources, River Development and Ganga Rejuvenation ===
Portrait	Minister (Birth-Death) Constituency	Term of office			Political party	Ministry	Prime Minister
Portrait	Minister (Birth-Death) Constituency	From	To	Period	Political party	Ministry	Prime Minister
Deputy Minister of Irrigation and Power
	Jaisukhlal Hathi (1909–1982); MP for Gujarat (Rajya Sabha), until 1957; MP for Halar, from 1957	12 September 1952	17 April 1957	9 years, 210 days	Indian National Congress	Nehru II	Jawaharlal Nehru
	Jaisukhlal Hathi (1909–1982); MP for Gujarat (Rajya Sabha), until 1957; MP for Halar, from 1957	17 April 1957	10 April 1962	9 years, 210 days	Indian National Congress	Nehru III	Jawaharlal Nehru
	Shyam Dhar Mishra (1919–2001); MP for Mirzapur	15 June 1964	11 January 1966	1 year, 223 days	Indian National Congress	Shastri	Lal Bahadur Shastri
	Shyam Dhar Mishra (1919–2001); MP for Mirzapur	11 January 1966	24 January 1966	1 year, 223 days	Indian National Congress	Nanda II	Gulzarilal Nanda (acting)
	Siddheshwar Prasad (1929–2023); MP for Nalanda	13 November 1967	18 March 1971	3 years, 170 days	Indian National Congress	Indira I	Indira Gandhi
	Siddheshwar Prasad (1929–2023); MP for Nalanda	18 March 1971	2 May 1971	3 years, 170 days	Indian National Congress	Indira II	Indira Gandhi
	Baijnath Kureel (1920–1984); MP for Ramsanehighat	2 May 1971	4 February 1973	1 year, 278 days	Indian National Congress	Indira II	Indira Gandhi
	Balgovind Verma (1923–1980); MP for Kheri	5 February 1973	9 November 1973	277 days	Indian National Congress	Indira II	Indira Gandhi
	Siddheshwar Prasad (1929–2023); MP for Nalanda	9 November 1973	10 October 1974	335 days	Indian National Congress	Indira II	
Deputy Minister of Agriculture and Irrigation
	Kedar Nath Singh; MP for Sultanpur	10 October 1974	24 March 1977	2 years, 165 days	Indian National Congress	Indira II	Indira Gandhi
	Prabhudas Patel (1914–2013); MP for Dabhoi	23 October 1974	14 March 1977	2 years, 142 days	Indian National Congress	Indira II	Indira Gandhi
