= Kushiyara Water Sharing Agreement =

MoU between India and Bangladesh on Kushiara River water sharing

Memorandum of Understanding on the Withdrawal of Water from the Kushiyara River
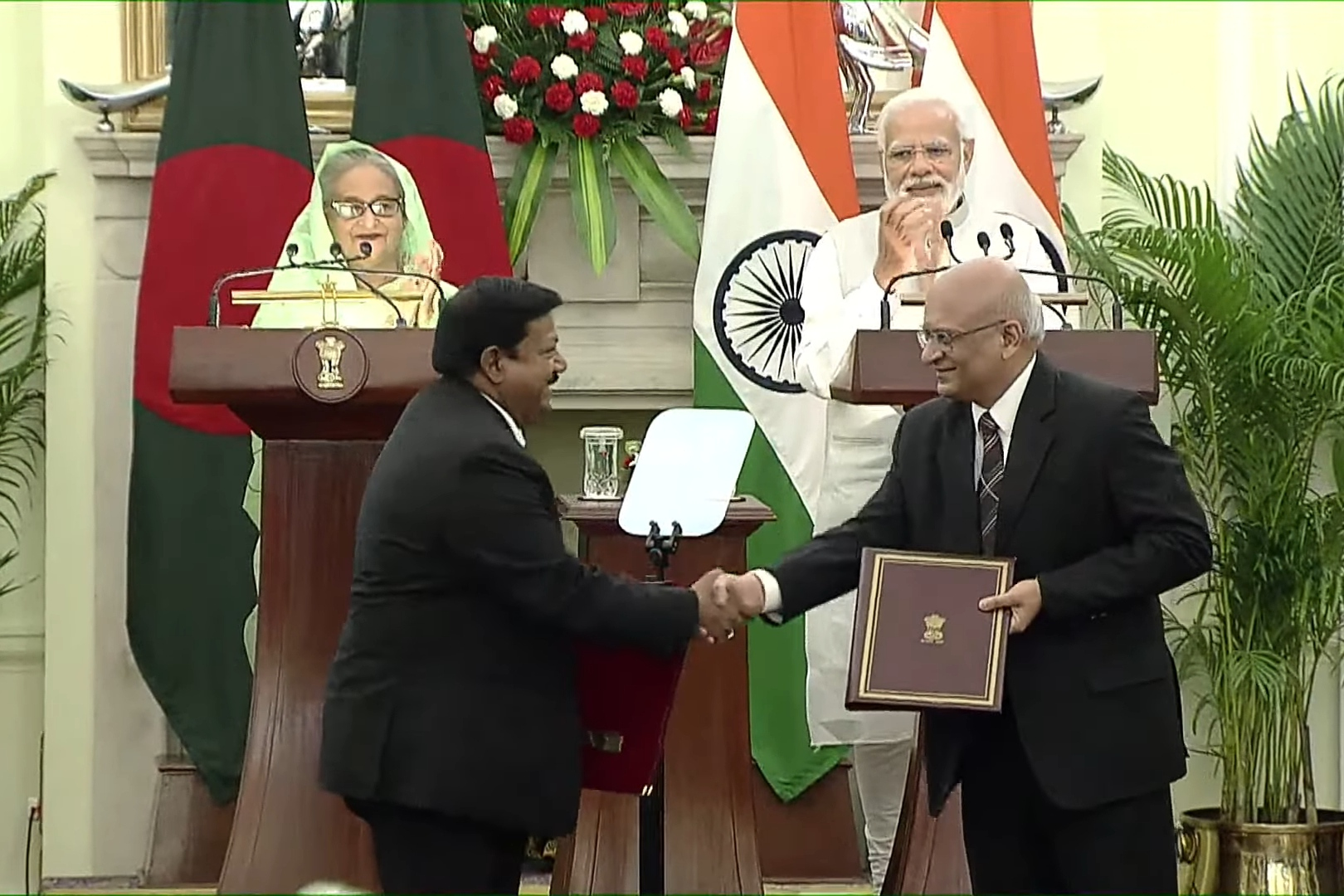
- Type: Memorandum of Understanding
- Context: Water sharing agreement between Bangladesh and India for the Kushiyara River
- Drafted: August 25, 2022
- Signed: September 6, 2022
- Location: Hyderabad House, New Delhi, India
- Effective: September 6, 2022
- Negotiators: Zahid Faruk, State Minister for Water Resources, Bangladesh; Gajendra Singh Shekhawat, Minister of Jal Shakti, India
- Original signatories: Sheikh Hasina, Prime Minister of Bangladesh; Narendra Modi, Prime Minister of India
- Signatories: Sheikh Hasina; Narendra Modi
- Parties: Bangladesh; India
- Language: English

The Kushiyara Water Sharing Agreement is a memorandum of understanding signed between Bangladesh and India on September 6, 2022, centered around the Kushiyara River. According to this agreement, Bangladesh will withdraw 153 cusecs of water from the Kushiyara River at the Rahimpur canal point in Sylhet.

== Background ==
Originating from the Angami Naga hills in northern Manipur, India, the Barak River flows through the Cachar district of Manipur and enters Bangladesh via Badarpur and Sylhet. At a place called Amalshid, located on the Sylhet border, the Barak River splits into two branches — one becomes the Surma River, and the other the Kushiyara River. The Kushiyara River is 120 miles long. India had long-standing objections to the use of water from the Kushiyara River for agricultural purposes through the Rahimpur canal. To resolve this issue, discussions began in January 2021 during a meeting of the working group of the Joint Rivers Commission. On August 25, during a ministerial-level meeting of the Bangladesh-India Joint Rivers Commission (JRC), a draft memorandum of understanding was finalized regarding the withdrawal of water from the Kushiyara River flowing into Sylhet from India. On behalf of Bangladesh, State Minister for Water Resources Zahid Faruk led the delegation, while on behalf of India, Minister of Jal Shakti Gajendra Singh Shekhawat led theirs. On September 6, a total of seven memorandums of understanding, including this one, were signed between the Prime Minister of Bangladesh, Sheikh Hasina, and the Prime Minister of India, Narendra Modi. In this agreement, India agreed to allow Bangladesh to withdraw 153 cusecs of water from the Kushiyara River at the Rahimpur point.

== Benefits of the agreement ==
No irrigation water was available in the seven upazilas at the Rahimpur point, and during the dry season, no agricultural activities could be carried out in the entire region. Due to the lack of irrigation water, for most of the year the agricultural land in that entire area remained completely barren. Between 2011 and 2015, Bangladesh constructed a pump house and a dam at the Rahimpur point. The Surma-Kushiyara Project was implemented by the Water Development Board to make this possible. As a result of the agreement, more than a hundred thousand people in the region will benefit. Boro cultivation will also become possible in the haor areas downstream of the canal, and fish farming will increase.

== Reaction ==
Bangladesh’s State Minister for Foreign Affairs, Shahriar Alam, termed this agreement a major achievement for Bangladesh.
