= Ministry of Parliamentary Affairs (India) =

Government ministry of India

- Branch of Government of India

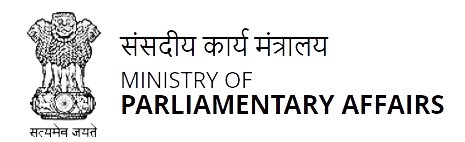
- Ministry of Parliamentary Affairs

Agency overview
- Formed: 1949
- Jurisdiction: Government of India
- Headquarters: Sansad Bhavan, Rafi Marg, New Delhi, Delhi, India
- Annual budget: ₹1,492 crore (US$150 million) (2026-27 est.)
- Agency executives: Kiren Rijiju, Union Cabinet Minister; Arjun Ram Meghwal, Union Minister of State; Nikunja Bihari Dhal, IAS, Secretary
- Website: mpa.nic.in

The Ministry of Parliamentary Affairs is an Indian government ministry. It is headed by the Union Cabinet Minister of Parliamentary Affairs.

It handles affairs relating to the Parliament of India, and works as a link between the two chambers, the Lok Sabha ("House of the People," the lower house) and the Rajya Sabha ("Council of States," the upper house). It was created in 1949 as a department but later became a full ministry.

The Minister of Parliamentary Affairs holds cabinet rank as a member of the Council of Ministers. The current minister is Kiren Rijiju. The Ministry of Parliamentary Affairs works under the overall direction of Cabinet Committee on Parliamentary Affairs.

The subject of 'Nomination of Members of Parliament on Committees and other bodies set up by the Government' has been allocated to the Ministry of Parliamentary Affairs under the Government of India (Allocation of Business) Rules, 1961 made by the President under article 77(3) of the Constitution.

Functions assigned to the Ministry under the Government of India (Allocation of Business) Rules, 1961 made by the President under Article 77(3) of the Constitution of India:-

- Dates of summoning and prorogation of the two Houses of Parliament, Dissolution of Lok Sabha, President's Address to Parliament.
- Planning and Coordination of legislative and other official business in both Houses.
- Allocation of Government time in Parliament for discussion of motions given notice of by Members.
- Liaison with Leaders and Whips of various Parties and Groups represented in Parliament.
- Lists of Members of Select and Joint Committees on Bills.
- Appointment of Members of Parliament on Committees and other bodies set up by Government.
- Functioning of Consultative Committees of Members of Parliament for various Ministries.
- Implementation of assurances given by Ministers in Parliament.
- Governments stand on Private Members Bills and Resolutions.
- Secretarial assistance to the Cabinet Committee on Parliamentary Affairs.
- Advice to Ministries on procedural and other Parliamentary matters.
- Coordination of action by Ministries on recommendations of general application made by Parliamentary Committees.
- Officially sponsored visits of Members of Parliament to places of interest.
- Matters connected with powers, privileges and immunities of Members of Parliament.
- Parliamentary Secretaries - functions.
- Organisation of Youth Parliament Competitions in Schools/Colleges throughout the country.
- Organisation of All India Whips Conference.
- Exchange of Government Sponsored Delegations of Members of Parliament with other countries.
- Determination of Policy and follow up action in regard to matters raised under rule 377 of the Rules of Procedure and Conduct of Business in Lok Sabha and by way of Special Mentions in Rajya Sabha.
- Manual for Handling Parliamentary work in Ministries/Departments.
- The Salaries and Allowances of Officers of Parliament Act, 1953 (20 of 1953).
- The Salary, Allowances and Pensions of Members of Parliament Act, 1954 (30 of 1954).
- The Salary, and Allowances of Leaders of Opposition in Parliament Act, 1977 (33 of 1977).
- The Leader and Chief Whips of Recognised Parties and Groups in Parliament (Facilities) Act, 1998 (5 of 1999).

== Divisions and Sections ==
- Member's Emoluments Section
- Minister's Personal Section
- National e-Vidhan Application Section
- Administration Division
- Accounts and Purchase Section
- Parliamentary Committee Section
- General Section
- Youth Parliament Division
- Protocol and Welfare Section
- Hindi Section
- Legislative Division
- Research Section
- Grievance and RTI Section
- Coordination and e-Governance Section
- Assurance Sections (Lower and Upper House)
- Cashier Section
- NIC Section
- Media and Communications Section

== Cabinet Ministers ==
Portrait	Minister (Birth-Death) Constituency	Term of office			Political party	Ministry	Prime Minister
Portrait	Minister (Birth-Death) Constituency	From	To	Period	Political party	Ministry	Prime Minister
	Satya Narayan Sinha (1900–1983); Constituent Assembly Member for Bihar (until 1952); MP for Samastipur (from 1952) (MoS until 10 April 1962)	26 February 1949	13 March 1967	18 years, 76 days	Indian National Congress	Nehru I	Jawaharlal Nehru
	Satya Narayan Sinha (1900–1983); Constituent Assembly Member for Bihar (until 1952); MP for Samastipur (from 1952) (MoS until 10 April 1962)	26 February 1949	13 March 1967	18 years, 76 days	Indian National Congress	Nehru II	Jawaharlal Nehru
	Satya Narayan Sinha (1900–1983); Constituent Assembly Member for Bihar (until 1952); MP for Samastipur (from 1952) (MoS until 10 April 1962)	26 February 1949	13 March 1967	18 years, 76 days	Indian National Congress	Nehru III	Jawaharlal Nehru
	Satya Narayan Sinha (1900–1983); Constituent Assembly Member for Bihar (until 1952); MP for Samastipur (from 1952) (MoS until 10 April 1962)	26 February 1949	13 March 1967	18 years, 76 days	Indian National Congress	Nehru IV	Jawaharlal Nehru
	Satya Narayan Sinha (1900–1983); Constituent Assembly Member for Bihar (until 1952); MP for Samastipur (from 1952) (MoS until 10 April 1962)	26 February 1949	13 March 1967	18 years, 76 days	Indian National Congress	Nanda I	Gulzarilal Nanda
	Satya Narayan Sinha (1900–1983); Constituent Assembly Member for Bihar (until 1952); MP for Samastipur (from 1952) (MoS until 10 April 1962)	26 February 1949	13 March 1967	18 years, 76 days	Indian National Congress	Shastri	Lal Bahadur Shastri
	Satya Narayan Sinha (1900–1983); Constituent Assembly Member for Bihar (until 1952); MP for Samastipur (from 1952) (MoS until 10 April 1962)	26 February 1949	13 March 1967	18 years, 76 days	Indian National Congress	Nanda II	Gulzarilal Nanda
	Satya Narayan Sinha (1900–1983); Constituent Assembly Member for Bihar (until 1952); MP for Samastipur (from 1952) (MoS until 10 April 1962)	26 February 1949	13 March 1967	18 years, 76 days	Indian National Congress	Indira I	Indira Gandhi
	Ram Subhag Singh (1917–1980); MP for Buxar	13 March 1967	14 February 1969	1 year, 338 days	Indian National Congress	Indira II	Indira Gandhi
	Kotha Raghuramaiah (1912–1979); MP for Guntur (MoS until 27 June 1970)	14 February 1969	18 March 1971	2 years, 32 days	Indian National Congress (R)	Indira II	Indira Gandhi
	Raj Bahadur (1912–1990); MP for Bharatpur	18 March 1971	5 February 1973	1 year, 324 days	Indian National Congress (R)	Indira III	Indira Gandhi
	Kotha Raghuramaiah (1912–1979); MP for Guntur	5 February 1973	24 March 1977	4 years, 47 days		Indira III	Indira Gandhi
	Ravindra Varma (1925–2006); MP for Ranchi	26 March 1977	28 July 1979	2 years, 124 days	Janata Party	Desai	Morarji Desai
	K. Gopal; MP for Karur (MoS)	4 August 1979	14 January 1980	163 days	Janata Party (Secular)	Charan Singh	Charan Singh
	Bhishma Narain Singh (1933–2018); Rajya Sabha MP for Bihar	14 January 1980	29 January 1983	3 years, 15 days	Indian National Congress (R)	Indira IV	Indira Gandhi
	Buta Singh (1934–2021); MP for Ropar	29 January 1983	31 October 1984	1 year, 337 days	Indian National Congress (R)	Indira IV	Indira Gandhi
	Buta Singh (1934–2021); MP for Ropar	31 October 1984	31 December 1984	1 year, 337 days	Indian National Congress (R)	Rajiv I	Rajiv Gandhi
	H. K. L. Bhagat (1921–2005); MP for East Delhi	31 December 1984	2 December 1989	4 years, 336 days	Indian National Congress (R)	Rajiv II	Rajiv Gandhi
	P. Upendra (1936–2009); Rajya Sabha MP for Andhra Pradesh	6 December 1989	10 November 1990	339 days	Telugu Desam Party	Vishwanath	V. P. Singh
	Satya Prakash Malaviya (1934–2018); Rajya Sabha MP for Uttar Pradesh	10 November 1990	21 June 1991	223 days	Samajwadi Janata Party (Rashtriya)	Chandra Shekhar	Chandra Shekhar
	Ghulam Nabi Azad (born 1949); Rajya Sabha MP for Maharashtra	21 June 1991	18 January 1993	1 year, 211 days	Indian National Congress (I)	Rao	P. V. Narasimha Rao
	Vidya Charan Shukla (1929–2013); MP for Raipur	18 January 1993	17 January 1996	2 years, 364 days	Indian National Congress (I)	Rao	P. V. Narasimha Rao
	Ghulam Nabi Azad (born 1949); Rajya Sabha MP for Maharashtra	18 January 1996	16 May 1996	119 days	Indian National Congress (I)	Rao	P. V. Narasimha Rao
	Pramod Mahajan (1949–2006); MP for Mumbai North East	16 May 1996	1 June 1996	16 days	Bharatiya Janata Party	Vajpayee I	Atal Bihari Vajpayee
	Ram Vilas Paswan (1946–2020); MP for Hajipur	1 June 1996	29 June 1996	28 days	Janata Dal	Deve Gowda	H. D. Deve Gowda
	Srikant Kumar Jena (born 1950); MP for Kendrapara	29 June 1996	21 April 1997	296 days	Janata Dal	Deve Gowda	H. D. Deve Gowda
	Srikant Kumar Jena (born 1950); MP for Kendrapara	21 April 1997	19 March 1998	296 days	Janata Dal	Gujral	Inder Kumar Gujral
	Madan Lal Khurana (1936–2018); MP for Delhi Sadar	19 March 1998	30 January 1999	317 days	Bharatiya Janata Party	Vajpayee II	Atal Bihari Vajpayee
	Rangarajan Kumaramangalam (1952–2000); MP for Tiruchirappalli	30 January 1999	13 October 1999	256 days	Bharatiya Janata Party	Vajpayee II	Atal Bihari Vajpayee
	Pramod Mahajan (1949–2006); MP for Maharashtra (Rajya Sabha)	13 October 1999	29 January 2003	3 years, 108 days	Bharatiya Janata Party	Vajpayee III	Atal Bihari Vajpayee
	Sushma Swaraj (1952–2019); Rajya Sabha MP for Uttarakhand	29 January 2003	22 May 2004	1 year, 114 days	Bharatiya Janata Party	Vajpayee III	Atal Bihari Vajpayee
	Ghulam Nabi Azad (born 1949); Rajya Sabha MP for Jammu and Kashmir	23 May 2004	1 November 2005	1 year, 162 days	Indian National Congress	Manmohan I	Manmohan Singh
	Priya Ranjan Dasmunsi (1945–2017); MP for Raiganj	1 November 2005	6 April 2008	2 years, 157 days	Indian National Congress	Manmohan I	Manmohan Singh
	Vayalar Ravi (born 1937); Rajya Sabha MP for Kerala	6 April 2008	22 May 2009	1 year, 46 days	Indian National Congress	Manmohan I	Manmohan Singh
	Pawan Kumar Bansal (born 1948); MP for Chandigarh	28 May 2009	28 October 2012	3 years, 153 days	Indian National Congress	Manmohan II	Manmohan Singh
	Kamal Nath (born 1946); MP for Chhindwara	28 October 2012	26 May 2014	1 year, 210 days	Indian National Congress	Manmohan II	Manmohan Singh
	M. Venkaiah Naidu (born 1948); Rajya Sabha MP for Karnataka, till 2016; Rajya Sabha MP for Rajasthan, from 2016	27 May 2014	5 July 2016	2 years, 39 days	Bharatiya Janata Party	Modi I	Narendra Modi
	Ananth Kumar (1959–2018); MP for Bangalore South	5 July 2016	12 November 2018^{[†]}	2 years, 130 days	Bharatiya Janata Party	Modi I	Narendra Modi
	Narendra Singh Tomar (born 1957); MP for Gwalior	12 November 2018	30 May 2019	199 days	Bharatiya Janata Party	Modi I	Narendra Modi
	Pralhad Joshi (born 1962); MP for Dharwad	30 May 2019	9 June 2024	5 years, 10 days	Bharatiya Janata Party	Modi II	Narendra Modi
	Kiren Rijiju (born 1971); MP for Arunachal West	9 June 2024	Incumbent	2 years, 125 days	Bharatiya Janata Party	Modi III	Narendra Modi

== Ministers of State ==
Portrait	Minister (Birth-Death) Constituency	Term of office			Political party	Ministry	Prime Minister
Portrait	Minister (Birth-Death) Constituency	From	To	Period	Political party	Ministry	Prime Minister
	Jagannath Rao (1909–1991); MP for Chatrapur	14 February 1966	13 March 1967	1 year, 27 days	Indian National Congress	Indira I	Indira Gandhi
	Inder Kumar Gujral (1919–2012); Rajya Sabha MP for Punjab	18 March 1967	14 February 1969	1 year, 333 days	Indian National Congress	Indira II	Indira Gandhi
	Om Mehta (1927–1995); Rajya Sabha MP for Jammu and Kashmir	30 June 1970	18 March 1971	6 years, 267 days	Indian National Congress	Indira II	Indira Gandhi
	Om Mehta (1927–1995); Rajya Sabha MP for Jammu and Kashmir	18 March 1971	24 March 1977	6 years, 267 days	Indian National Congress (R)	Indira III	Indira Gandhi
	Larang Sai (1935–2004); MP for Sarguja	14 August 1977	28 July 1979	1 year, 348 days	Janata Party	Desai	Morarji Desai
	Ram Kripal Sinha (1934–2023); Rajya Sabha MP for Bihar	14 August 1977	28 July 1979	1 year, 348 days	Janata Party	Desai	Morarji Desai
	Pendekanti Venkatasubbaiah (1921–1993); MP for Nandyal	16 January 1980	2 September 1982	2 years, 229 days	Indian National Congress (I)	Indira IV	Indira Gandhi
	Sitaram Kesri (1919–2000); Rajya Sabha MP for Bihar	3 March 1980	15 January 1982	1 year, 318 days	Indian National Congress (I)	Indira IV	Indira Gandhi
	H. K. L. Bhagat (1921–2005); MP for East Delhi	2 September 1982	31 October 1984	2 years, 59 days	Indian National Congress (I)	Indira IV	Indira Gandhi
	Kalpnath Rai (1941–1999); Rajya Sabha MP for Uttar Pradesh	29 January 1983	31 October 1984	1 year, 276 days	Indian National Congress (I)	Indira IV	Indira Gandhi
	H. K. L. Bhagat (1921–2005); MP for East Delhi	4 November 1984	31 December 1984	57 days	Indian National Congress (I)	Rajiv I	Rajiv Gandhi
	N. K. P. Salve (1921–2012); Rajya Sabha MP for Maharashtra	4 November 1984	31 December 1984	57 days	Indian National Congress (I)	Rajiv I	Rajiv Gandhi
	Ghulam Nabi Azad (born 1949); MP for Washim	31 December 1984	12 May 1986	1 year, 132 days	Indian National Congress (I)	Rajiv II	Rajiv Gandhi
	Margaret Alva (born 1942); Rajya Sabha MP for Karnataka	31 December 1984	25 September 1985	268 days	Indian National Congress (I)	Rajiv II	Rajiv Gandhi
	Sitaram Kesri (1919–2000); Rajya Sabha MP for Bihar	25 September 1985	22 October 1986	1 year, 27 days	Indian National Congress (I)	Rajiv II	Rajiv Gandhi
	Sheila Dikshit (1938–2019); MP for Kannauj	12 May 1986	2 December 1989	3 years, 204 days	Indian National Congress (I)	Rajiv II	Rajiv Gandhi
	M. M. Jacob (1926–2018); Rajya Sabha MP for Kerala	22 October 1986	2 December 1989	3 years, 61 days	Indian National Congress (I)	Rajiv II	Rajiv Gandhi
	Radhakishan Malviya (1943–2013); Rajya Sabha MP for Madhya Pradesh	4 July 1989	2 December 1989	151 days	Indian National Congress (I)	Rajiv II	Rajiv Gandhi
	P. Namgyal (1937–2010); MP for Ladakh	4 July 1989	2 December 1989	151 days	Indian National Congress (I)	Rajiv II	Rajiv Gandhi
	Satya Pal Malik (1946–2025); MP for Aligarh	23 April 1990	10 November 1990	201 days	Janata Dal	Vishwanath	V. P. Singh
	M. M. Jacob (1926–2018); Rajya Sabha MP for Kerala	21 June 1991	17 January 1993	1 year, 210 days	Indian National Congress (I)	Rao	P. V. Narasimha Rao
	Rangarajan Kumaramangalam (1952–2000); MP for Salem	21 June 1991	2 December 1993	2 years, 164 days	Indian National Congress (I)	Rao	P. V. Narasimha Rao
	Abrar Ahmed (1956–2004); Rajya Sabha MP for Rajasthan	18 January 1993	2 April 1994	1 year, 74 days	Indian National Congress (I)	Rao	P. V. Narasimha Rao
	Margaret Alva (born 1942); Rajya Sabha MP for Karnataka	19 January 1993	16 May 1996	3 years, 118 days	Indian National Congress (I)	Rao	P. V. Narasimha Rao
	Mukul Wasnik (born 1959); MP for Buldhana	19 January 1993	16 May 1996	3 years, 118 days	Indian National Congress (I)	Rao	P. V. Narasimha Rao
	Eduardo Faleiro (born 1940); MP for Mormugao	18 December 1993	19 September 1995	1 year, 275 days	Indian National Congress (I)	Rao	P. V. Narasimha Rao
	Rameshwar Thakur (1925–2015); Rajya Sabha MP for Bihar	17 April 1994	22 December 1994	249 days	Indian National Congress (I)	Rao	P. V. Narasimha Rao
	Mallikarjun Goud (1941–2002); MP for Mahabubnagar	17 April 1994	16 May 1996	2 years, 29 days	Indian National Congress (I)	Rao	P. V. Narasimha Rao
	Matang Sinh (1953–2021); Rajya Sabha MP for Assam	10 February 1995	16 May 1996	1 year, 96 days	Indian National Congress (I)	Rao	P. V. Narasimha Rao
	Vilas Muttemwar (born 1949); MP for Nagpur	15 September 1995	16 May 1996	244 days	Indian National Congress (I)	Rao	P. V. Narasimha Rao
	S. S. Ahluwalia (born 1951); Rajya Sabha MP for Bihar	19 September 1995	16 May 1996	240 days	Indian National Congress (I)	Rao	P. V. Narasimha Rao
	Beni Prasad Verma (1941–2020); MP for Kaiserganj	1 June 1996	29 June 1996	28 days	Samajwadi Party	Deve Gowda	H. D. Deve Gowda
	Ummareddy Venkateswarlu (born 1935); MP for Bapatla	1 June 1996	29 June 1996	28 days	Telugu Desam Party	Deve Gowda	H. D. Deve Gowda
	S. R. Balasubramoniyan (born 1938); MP for Nilgiris	29 June 1996	21 April 1997	296 days	Tamil Maanila Congress (Moopanar)	Deve Gowda	H. D. Deve Gowda
	S. R. Balasubramoniyan (born 1938); MP for Nilgiris	1 May 1997	19 March 1998	322 days	Tamil Maanila Congress (Moopanar)	Gujral	Inder Kumar Gujral
	M. P. Veerendra Kumar (1936–2020); MP for Kozhikode	26 May 1997	2 July 1997	37 days	Janata Dal	Gujral	Inder Kumar Gujral
	Jayanthi Natarajan (born 1954); Rajya Sabha MP for Tamil Nadu	9 June 1997	19 March 1998	283 days	Tamil Maanila Congress (Moopanar)	Gujral	Inder Kumar Gujral
	R. K. Kumar (1942–1999); Rajya Sabha MP for Tamil Nadu	19 March 1998	22 May 1998	64 days	All India Anna Dravida Munnetra Kazhagam	Vajpayee II	Atal Bihari Vajpayee
	Ram Naik (born 1934); MP for Mumbai North	20 March 1998	5 May 1999	1 year, 46 days	Bharatiya Janata Party	Vajpayee II	Atal Bihari Vajpayee
	Dilip Ray (born 1954); Rajya Sabha MP for Odisha	22 May 1998	13 October 1999	1 year, 144 days	Biju Janata Dal	Vajpayee II	Atal Bihari Vajpayee
	Santosh Kumar Gangwar (born 1948); MP for Bareilly	16 February 1999	13 October 1999	239 days	Bharatiya Janata Party	Vajpayee II	Atal Bihari Vajpayee
	Mukhtar Abbas Naqvi (born 1957); MP for Rampur	16 February 1999	13 October 1999	239 days	Bharatiya Janata Party	Vajpayee II	Atal Bihari Vajpayee
	Dilip Ray (born 1954); Rajya Sabha MP for Odisha	13 October 1999	22 November 1999	40 days	Biju Janata Dal	Vajpayee III	Atal Bihari Vajpayee
	Faggan Singh Kulaste (born 1959); MP for Mandla	13 October 1999	22 November 1999	40 days	Bharatiya Janata Party	Vajpayee III	Atal Bihari Vajpayee
	Sriram Chauhan (born 1953); MP for Basti	13 October 1999	22 November 1999	40 days	Bharatiya Janata Party	Vajpayee III	Atal Bihari Vajpayee
	O. Rajagopal (born 1929); Rajya Sabha MP for Madhya Pradesh	22 November 1999	22 May 2004	4 years, 182 days	Bharatiya Janata Party	Vajpayee III	Atal Bihari Vajpayee
	Bhavna Chikhalia (1955–2013); MP for Junagadh	29 January 2003	22 May 2004	1 year, 114 days	Bharatiya Janata Party	Vajpayee III	Atal Bihari Vajpayee
	Vijay Goel (born 1954); MP for Chandni Chowk	29 January 2003	24 May 2003	115 days	Bharatiya Janata Party	Vajpayee III	Atal Bihari Vajpayee
	Santosh Kumar Gangwar (born 1948); MP for Bareilly	24 May 2003	8 September 2003	107 days	Bharatiya Janata Party	Vajpayee III	Atal Bihari Vajpayee
	Suresh Pachouri (born 1952); Rajya Sabha MP for Madhya Pradesh	23 May 2004	6 April 2008	3 years, 319 days	Indian National Congress	Manmohan I	Manmohan Singh
	Bijoy Krishna Handique (1934–2015); MP for Jorhat	23 May 2004	6 April 2008	3 years, 319 days	Indian National Congress	Manmohan I	Manmohan Singh
	Suryakanta Patil (born 1948); MP for Hingoli	23 May 2004	22 May 2009	4 years, 364 days	Nationalist Congress Party	Manmohan I	Manmohan Singh
	Pawan Kumar Bansal (born 1948); MP for Chandigarh	6 April 2008	22 May 2009	1 year, 46 days	Indian National Congress	Manmohan I	Manmohan Singh
	V. Narayanasamy (born 1947); MP for Puducherry	6 April 2008	22 May 2009	1 year, 46 days	Indian National Congress	Manmohan I	Manmohan Singh
	V. Narayanasamy (born 1947); MP for Puducherry	28 May 2009	12 July 2011	2 years, 45 days	Indian National Congress	Manmohan II	Manmohan Singh
	Prithviraj Chavan (born 1946); Rajya Sabha MP for Maharashtra	28 May 2009	10 October 2011	2 years, 135 days	Indian National Congress	Manmohan II	Manmohan Singh
	Ashwani Kumar (born 1952); Rajya Sabha MP for Punjab	19 January 2011	12 July 2011	174 days	Indian National Congress	Manmohan II	Manmohan Singh
	Harish Rawat (born 1948); MP for Haridwar	12 July 2011	28 October 2012	1 year, 108 days	Indian National Congress	Manmohan II	Manmohan Singh
	Rajeev Shukla (born 1959); Rajya Sabha MP for Maharashtra	12 July 2011	26 May 2014	2 years, 318 days	Indian National Congress	Manmohan II	Manmohan Singh
	Paban Singh Ghatowar (born 1950); MP for Dibrugarh	20 July 2011	26 May 2014	2 years, 310 days	Indian National Congress	Manmohan II	Manmohan Singh
	Santosh Kumar Gangwar (born 1948); MP for Bareilly	27 May 2014	9 November 2014	166 days	Bharatiya Janata Party	Modi I	Narendra Modi
	Prakash Javadekar (born 1951); Rajya Sabha MP for Madhya Pradesh	27 May 2014	9 November 2014	166 days	Bharatiya Janata Party	Modi I	Narendra Modi
	Rajiv Pratap Rudy (born 1962); MP for Saran	9 November 2014	5 July 2016	1 year, 239 days	Bharatiya Janata Party	Modi I	Narendra Modi
	Mukhtar Abbas Naqvi (born 1957); Rajya Sabha MP for Uttar Pradesh, till 2016; Rajya Sabha MP for Jharkhand, from 2016	9 November 2014	3 September 2017	2 years, 298 days	Bharatiya Janata Party	Modi I	Narendra Modi
	S. S. Ahluwalia (born 1951); MP for Darjeeling	5 July 2017	3 September 2017	60 days	Bharatiya Janata Party	Modi I	Narendra Modi
	Vijay Goel (born 1954); Rajya Sabha MP for Rajasthan	3 September 2017	30 May 2019	1 year, 269 days	Bharatiya Janata Party	Modi I	Narendra Modi
	Arjun Ram Meghwal (born 1953); MP for Bikaner	3 September 2017	30 May 2019	6 years, 281 days	Bharatiya Janata Party	Modi I	Narendra Modi
	Arjun Ram Meghwal (born 1953); MP for Bikaner	31 May 2019	9 June 2024	6 years, 281 days	Bharatiya Janata Party	Modi II	Narendra Modi
	V. Muraleedharan (born 1958); Rajya Sabha MP for Maharashtra	31 May 2019	9 June 2024	5 years, 10 days	Bharatiya Janata Party	Modi II	Narendra Modi
	Arjun Ram Meghwal (born 1953); MP for Bikaner	9 June 2024	Incumbent	2 years, 125 days	Bharatiya Janata Party	Modi III	Narendra Modi
	L. Murugan (born 1977); Rajya Sabha MP for Madhya Pradesh	9 June 2024	13 October 2026	2 years, 125 days	Bharatiya Janata Party	Modi III	Narendra Modi

== Deputy Ministers ==
Portrait	Minister (Birth-Death) Constituency	Term of office			Political party	Ministry	Prime Minister
Portrait	Minister (Birth-Death) Constituency	From	To	Period	Political party	Ministry	Prime Minister
	Satya Narayan Sinha (1900–1983); Constituent Assembly Member for Bihar	1 October 1948	26 February 1949	148 days	Indian National Congress	Nehru I	Jawaharlal Nehru
	Vidya Charan Shukla (1929–2013); MP for Mahasamund	24 January 1966	14 February 1966	21 days	Indian National Congress	Indira I	Indira Gandhi
	Rohanlal Chaturvedi (1919–?); MP for Etah	18 March 1967	14 November 1967	241 days	Indian National Congress	Indira II	Indira Gandhi
	J. B. Muthyal Rao; MP for Nagarkurnool	18 March 1967	14 November 1967	241 days	Indian National Congress	Indira II	Indira Gandhi
	Iqbal Singh (1923–1988); MP for Fazilka	14 February 1969	8 July 1970	1 year, 144 days	Indian National Congress (R)	Indira II	Indira Gandhi
	Raghbir Singh Panjhazari (1914–1999); Rajya Sabha MP for Punjab	30 June 1970	18 March 1971	261 days	Indian National Congress (R)	Indira II	Indira Gandhi
	Pothuraju Parthasarthy; MP for Rajampet	30 June 1970	18 March 1971	261 days	Indian National Congress (R)	Indira II	Indira Gandhi
	Kedar Nath Singh; MP for Sultanpur	2 May 1971	10 October 1974	3 years, 161 days	Indian National Congress (R)	Indira III	Indira Gandhi
	B. Shankaranand (1925–2009); MP for Chikkodi	2 May 1971	24 March 1977	5 years, 326 days	Indian National Congress (R)	Indira III	Indira Gandhi
	Kalpnath Rai (1941–1999); Rajya Sabha MP for Uttar Pradesh	15 January 1982	6 September 1982	234 days	Indian National Congress (I)	Indira IV	Indira Gandhi
	Mallikarjun Goud (1941–2002); MP for Mahabubnagar	15 January 1982	31 October 1984	2 years, 351 days	Indian National Congress (I)	Indira IV	Indira Gandhi
	Mallikarjun Goud (1941–2002); MP for Mahabubnagar	31 October 1984	31 December 1984	2 years, 351 days	Indian National Congress (I)	Rajiv I	Rajiv Gandhi
	Radhakishan Malviya (1943–2013); Rajya Sabha MP for Madhya Pradesh	25 June 1988	4 July 1989	1 year, 9 days	Indian National Congress (I)	Rajiv II	Rajiv Gandhi
	P. Namgyal (1937–2010); MP for Ladakh	25 June 1988	4 July 1989	1 year, 9 days	Indian National Congress (I)	Rajiv II	Rajiv Gandhi
	Jagdeep Dhankhar (born 1951); MP for Jhunjhunu	23 May 1990	5 November 1990	166 days	Janata Dal	Vishwanath	V. P. Singh
