= Manubhai =

Manubhai is an Indian masculine given name. It may refer to

- Manubhai Kotadia, Indian politician.
- Manubhai Mehta, Dewan of Baroda state.
- Manubhai Pancholi, Gujarati language novelist, author and educationist.
- Manubhai Shah, Indian politician
