= Ministry of Water Resources =

Ministry of water resources may refer to:

- Ministry of Water Resources (Bangladesh)
- Ministry of Water Resources (China)
- Ministry of Water Resources (India)
  - Ministry of Water Resources, River Development and Ganga Rejuvenation (till 2019)
  - Ministry of Drinking Water and Sanitation (2011–2019)
  - Ministry of Jal Shakti (from 2019)
- Ministry of Water Resources (Iraq)
- Minister of Water Resources (Nigeria)
- Ministry of Water Resources (Pakistan)
- Ministry of Water Resources (Syria)
