= V. P. Singh ministry =

Union Council of Ministers headed by V.P Singh

- 14th ministry of the Republic of India

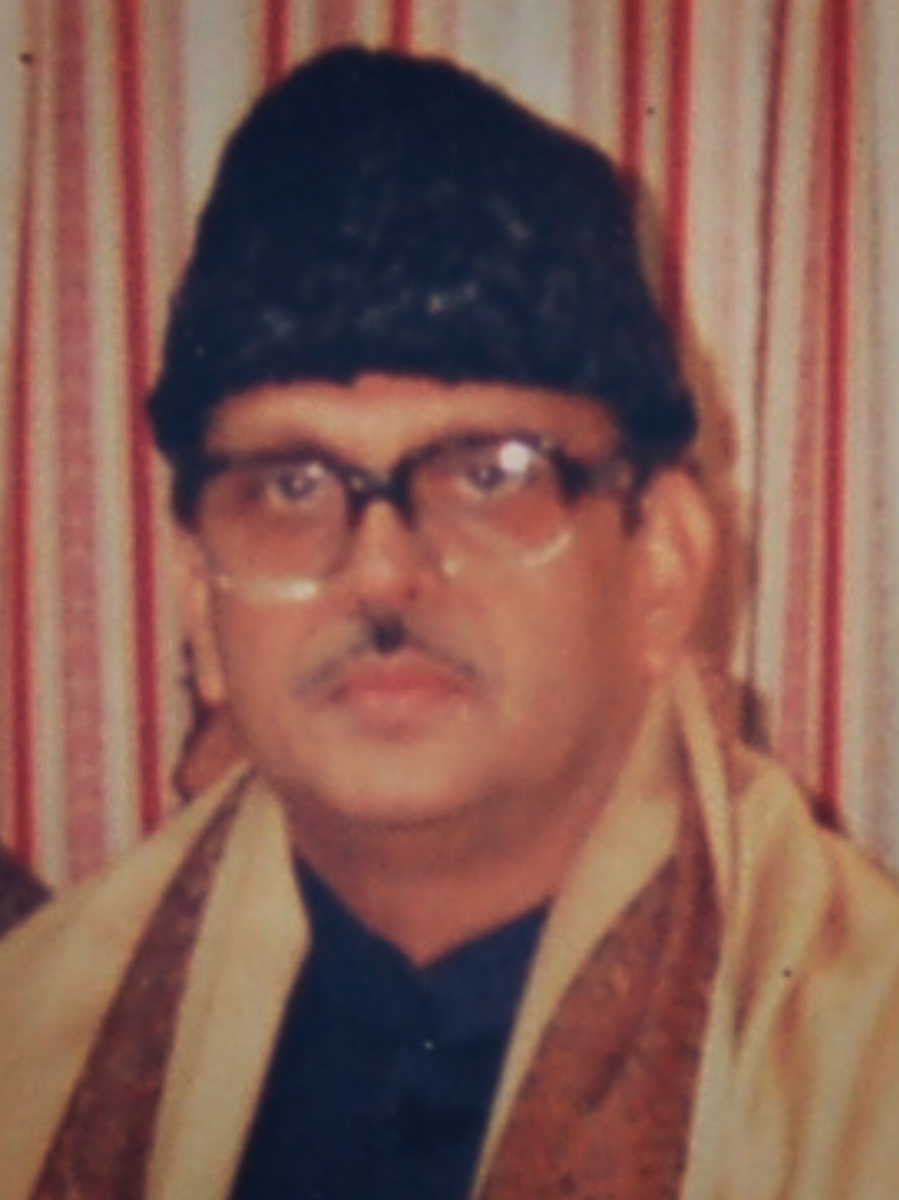
- Vishwanath Pratap Singh
- Date formed: 2 December 1989
- Date dissolved: 10 November 1990

People and organisations
- Head of state: R. Venkataraman
- Head of government: Vishwanath Pratap Singh
- Member party: Janata Dal (National Front) (Supported by BJP 85/543 MPs).
- Status in legislature: Coalition
- Opposition party: Indian National Congress (Indira) (Congress alliance)
- Opposition leader: Rajiv Gandhi (lok sabha); P. Shiv Shankar (rajya sabha)

History
- Election: 1989
- Legislature term: 11 months
- Predecessor: Second Rajiv Gandhi ministry
- Successor: Chandra Shekhar ministry

Vishwanath Pratap Singh was sworn in as Prime Minister of India on 2 December 1989. His initial ministry consisted of the following Cabinet ministers and their departments. The Cabinet was functional from 2 December 1989 to 10 November 1990.

== Council of Ministers ==
=== Cabinet Ministers ===
Portfolio	Minister	Took office	Left office	Party	Remarks
Prime Minister; Minister of Defence; Minister of Personnel, Public Grievances and Pensions; Minister of Science and Technology; Department of Atomic Energy; Department of Electronics; Department of Ocean Development; Department of Space; And also in-charge of all other important portfolios and policy issues not allocated to any Minister.	V. P. Singh	2 December 1989	10 November 1990	JD	
Deputy Prime Minister	Devi Lal	2 December 1989	1 August 1990	JD	
Minister of Agriculture	Devi Lal	2 December 1989	1 August 1990	JD	
Minister of Agriculture	V. P. Singh	1 August 1990	10 November 1990	JD	Prime Minister was responsible.
Minister of Finance	Madhu Dandavate	5 December 1989	10 November 1990	JD	
Minister of External Affairs	Inder Kumar Gujral	6 December 1989	10 November 1990	JD	
Minister of Home Affairs	Mufti Mohammad Sayeed	6 December 1989	10 November 1990	JD	
Minister of Railways	George Fernandes	6 December 1989	10 November 1990	JD	
Minister of Industry	Ajit Singh	6 December 1989	10 November 1990	JD	
Minister of Petroleum and Chemicals	M. S. Gurupadaswamy	6 December 1989	10 November 1990	JD	
Minister of Commerce; Minister of Tourism	Arun Nehru	6 December 1989	10 November 1990	JD	
Minister of Food Processing Industries; Minister of Textiles	Sharad Yadav	6 December 1989	10 November 1990	JD	
Minister of Environment and Forests	V. P. Singh	2 December 1989	23 April 1990	JD	Prime Minister was responsible.
Minister of Environment and Forests	Nilamani Routray	23 April 1990	10 November 1990	JD	
Minister of Health and Family Welfare	Nilamani Routray	6 December 1989	23 April 1990	JD	
Minister of Health and Family Welfare	Rasheed Masood	23 April 1990	10 November 1990	JD	Minister of State (I/C) was responsible.
Minister of Energy; Minister of Civil Aviation	Arif Mohammad Khan	6 December 1989	10 November 1990	JD	
Minister of Labour; Minister of Welfare	Ram Vilas Paswan	6 December 1989	10 November 1990	JD	
Minister of Surface Transport	K. P. Unnikrishnan	6 December 1989	10 November 1990	JD	
Minister of Communications	K. P. Unnikrishnan	6 December 1989	23 April 1990	JD	
Minister of Communications	Janeshwar Mishra	23 April 1990	10 November 1990	JD	Minister of State (I/C) was responsible.
Minister of Steel and Mines; Minister of Law and Justice	Dinesh Goswami	6 December 1989	10 November 1990	AGP	
Minister of Urban Development	Murasoli Maran	6 December 1989	10 November 1990	DMK	
Minister of Information and Broadcasting	P. Upendra	6 December 1989	10 November 1990	TDP	
Minister of Food and Civil Supplies	Nathuram Mirdha	8 December 1989	10 November 1990	JD	
Minister of Kashmir Affairs	George Fernandes	13 March 1990	30 May 1990	JD	

=== Ministers of State (Independent Charge) ===
Portfolio	Minister	Took office	Left office	Party
Minister of State (Independent Charge) of Water Resources	Manubhai Kotadia	6 December 1989	5 November 1990	JD

=== Ministers of State ===
Portfolio	Minister	Took office	Left office	Party
Minister of State in the Ministry of Environment and Forests	Maneka Gandhi	6 December 1989	6 November 1990	JD
Minister of State in the Ministry of Science and Technology	M. G. K. Menon	18 December 1989	10 November 1990	JD
Minister of State in the Department of Atomic Energy; Minister of State in the Department of Electronics; Minister of State in the Department of Space; Minister of State in the Department of Ocean Development	M. G. K. Menon	25 December 1989	10 November 1990	JD
Minister of State in the Ministry of Programme Implementation	Maneka Gandhi	20 January 1990	23 April 1990	JD
Minister of State in the Ministry of Programme Implementation	Bhagey Gobardhan	23 April 1990	10 November 1990	JD
Minister of State in the Ministry of Human Resource Development	M. G. K. Menon (Education)	20 January 1990	23 April 1990	JD
Minister of State in the Ministry of Human Resource Development	Chimanbhai Mehta	23 April 1990	10 November 1990	JD
Minister of State in the Ministry of Defence	Raja Ramanna	20 January 1990	10 November 1990	JD
Minister of State in the Ministry of Agriculture	Nitish Kumar (Agriculture and Cooperation)	23 April 1990	10 November 1990	JD
Minister of State in the Ministry of Agriculture	Upendra Nath Verma (Rural Development)	23 April 1990	10 November 1990	JD
Minister of State in the Ministry of Home Affairs	Subodh Kant Sahay	23 April 1990	5 November 1990	JD
Minister of State in the Ministry of Industry	Srikant Kumar Jena (Small Scale Industries and Agro and Rural Industries)	23 April 1990	10 November 1990	JD
Minister of State in the Ministry of Parliamentary Affairs; Minister of State in the Ministry of Tourism	Satya Pal Malik	23 April 1990	10 November 1990	JD
Minister of State in the Ministry of External Affairs	Hari Kishore Singh	23 April 1990	10 November 1990	JD
Minister of State in the Ministry of Petroleum and Chemicals	Bhajaman Behara	23 April 1990	10 November 1990	JD
Minister of State in the Ministry of Food and Civil Supplies	Ram Pujan Patel	23 April 1990	10 November 1990	JD
Minister of State in the Ministry of Commerce	Arangil Sreedharan	23 April 1990	10 November 1990	JD

=== Deputy Ministers ===
Portfolio	Minister	Took office	Left office	Party
Deputy Minister in the Ministry of Human Resource Development	Bhakta Charan Das (Youth Affairs and Sports)	23 April 1990	5 November 1990	JD
Deputy Minister in the Ministry of Welfare	Bhakta Charan Das (Women and Child Development)	23 April 1990	5 November 1990	JD
Deputy Minister in the Ministry of Parliamentary Affairs	Jagdeep Dhankhar	23 April 1990	5 November 1990	JD
Deputy Minister in the Ministry of Finance	Anil Shastri	23 April 1990	10 November 1990	JD
Deputy Minister in the Ministry of Railways	Ajay Singh	23 April 1990	10 November 1990	JD
