= Satya Prakash Malaviya =

Indian politician (1934–2018)

Satya Prakash Malviya

Member of Parliament, Rajya Sabha
- In office 1984–1996
- Constituency: Uttar Pradesh

Minister of Parliamentary Affairs
- In office 21 November 1990 – 21 June 1991
- Prime Minister: Chandra Shekhar

Minister of Petroleum and Chemicals
- In office 21 November 1990 – 21 June 1991
- Prime Minister: Chandra Shekhar

Personal details
- Born: 25 June 1934 Allahabad, United Provinces, British India
- Died: 16 September 2018 (aged 84) New Delhi, India
- Party: Indian National Congress
- Other political affiliations: Bhartiya Kranti Dal(Before 1975); Janata Party(1977-1980); Lokdal(1984–1990); Janata Dal(1990); Samajwadi Janata Party (Rashtriya)(1991–2000)
- Spouse: Dr. Sarojini Malaviya
- Occupation: Politician

Satya Prakash Malviya (25 June 1934 – 16 September 2018) was an Indian politician. He was elected to the Rajya Sabha in 1984 and 1990 from Uttar Pradesh. He served as Minister of Parliamentary Affairs and Minister of Petroleum and Chemicals in Chandra Shekhar cabinet from 1990 to 1991.

== Early life ==
Satya Prakash Malviya was born on 25 June 1934 at Malviyanagar in the city of Allahabad in Uttar Pradesh. His father was a professor. He earned Master of Arts and Bachelor of Law degree at Allahabad University. In 1962, he married Dr. Sarojini Malviya. The couple had one daughter.

== Political career ==
Satya Prakash Malaviya was elected as Mayor of Allahabad in 1972. In 1974, he was elected as member of Uttar Pradesh Legislative Assembly from Allahabad South constituency on Bharatiya Kranti Dal ticket. During Emergency, he was arrested under Maintenance of Internal Security Act (MISA) and spent 19 months in Lucknow jail. In 1977, he was elected as member of Uttar Pradesh Legislative Assembly from Allahabad South on Janata Party ticket. He was made Minister of Self-governance and Transport in Uttar Pradesh state cabinet.

In 1984, he was elected as member of Rajya Sabha from Uttar Pradesh on Lokdal ticket. He also served as Vice Chairman of Rajya Sabha from 1988 to 1990. In April 1990, he was again sent to Rajya Sabha from Uttar Pradesh on Janata Dal ticket. In November 1990, he joined revolting section of Janata Dal MPs and formed Chandra Shekhar government. He was Minister of Petroleum and Chemicals and Minister of Parliamentary Affairs in Chandra Shekhar cabinet from November 1990 to June 1991.

In 2000, he joined Indian National Congress. In 2004 Lok Sabha election, he fought from Allahabad constituency on Congress ticket, but lost to Rewati Raman Singh of Samajwadi Party.

== Positions held ==
- 1972–1973 Mayor, Allahabad Corporation.
- 1974–1977 Member of Legislative Assembly, Uttar Pradesh.
- 1977–1980 Member of Legislative Assembly, Uttar Pradesh (2nd term).
- 1977–1978 Minister of Local Self Government and Urban Development in Uttar Pradesh government.
- 1979–1980 Minister of Transport and Civil Aviation in Uttar Pradesh government.
- 1984–1990 Member, Rajya Sabha.
- 1986–1987 Member, Committee on Petitions (Rajya Sabha).
- 1988–1989 Member, General Purposes Committee (Rajya Sabha).
- 1990–1996 Member, Rajya Sabha (2nd term).
- November 1990 – June 1991 Minister of Parliamentary Affairs, Chandra Shekhar government.
- November 1990 – June 1991 Minister of Petroleum and Chemicals, Chandra Shekhar government.

== Writings ==
- Chandra Shekhar : A Committed Socialist, Secularist and Democrat in Chandra Shekhar in Parliament: A Commemorative Volume (2016).
