= Chandra Shekhar ministry =

Union Council of Ministers headed by Chandra sekhar

- 15th ministry of the Republic of India

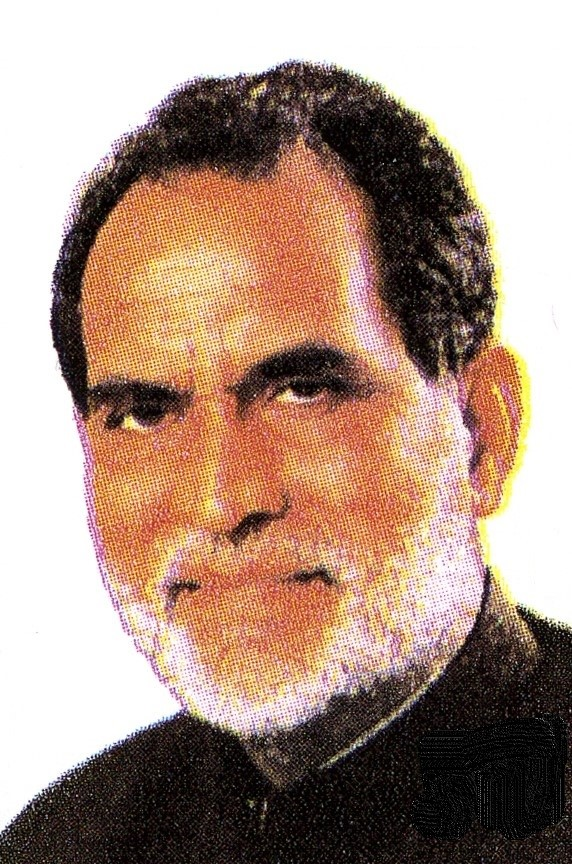
- Chandra Shekhar
- Date formed: 10 November 1990
- Date dissolved: 21 June 1991

People and organisations
- Head of state: R. Venkataraman
- Head of government: Chandra Shekhar
- Deputy head of government: Chaudhary Devi Lal
- Member party: Samajwadi Janata Party (Rashtriya) (supported by Indian National Congress 212/543 MPs)
- Status in legislature: Coalition
- Opposition leader: Lal Krishna Advani (BJP) (24 December 1990 – 13 March 1991) (lok sabha); P. Shiv Shankar INC (I) (Rajya Sabha)

History
- Outgoing election: 1991
- Legislature terms: 7 months and 11 days
- Predecessor: V. P. Singh ministry
- Successor: Rao ministry

Chandra Shekhar was sworn in as Prime Minister of India on 10 November 1990.

== Cabinet ==
Cabinet members
Portfolio	Minister	Took office	Left office	Party
Prime Minister; Minister of Home Affairs; Minister of Defence; Ministry of Information and Broadcasting	Chandra Shekhar	10 November 1990	21 June 1991	SJP(R)
Deputy Prime Ministers; Minister of Agriculture and Tourism	Chaudhary Devi Lal	10 November 1990	21 June 1991	SJP(R)
Minister of External Affairs	Vidya Charan Shukla	21 November 1990	21 June 1991	SJP(R)
Minister of Law and Justice; Minister of Commerce	Subramanian Swamy	21 November 1990	21 June 1991	JP
Minister of Finance	Yashwant Sinha	10 November 1990	21 June 1991	SJP(R)
Minister of Railways	Janeshwar Mishra	21 November 1990	21 June 1991	SJP(R)
Minister of Telecommunications	Sanjay Singh	21 November 1990	21 June 1991	SJP(R)
Minister of Human Resource Development	Raj Mangal Pande	21 November 1990	21 June 1991	SJP(R)
Minister of Textiles	Hukmdev Narayan Yadav	21 November 1990	21 June 1991	SJP(R)
Minister of Urban Development	Daulat Ram Saran	21 November 1990	21 June 1991	SJP(R)
Minister of Steel and Mines	Ashoke Kumar Sen	21 November 1990	21 June 1991	SJP(R)
Minister of Parliamentary Affairs	Satya Prakash Malaviya	21 November 1990	21 June 1991	SJP(R)
Minister of Food and Civil Supplies	Rao Birendra Singh	21 November 1990	21 June 1991	SJP(R)
Minister of Water Resources	Manubhai Kotadia	21 November 1990	25 April 1991	SJP(R)
Ministry of Surface Transport	Manubhai Kotadia	21 November 1990	25 April 1991	SJP(R)
Ministry of Energy	Kalyan Singh Kalvi	21 November 1990	25 April 1991	SJP(R)
Minister of Health and Family Welfare	Shakeelur Rahman	21 November 1990	20 February 1991	SJP(R)

=== Ministers of State (Independent Charge) ===
- Maneka Gandhi, Minister of State (Independent Charge) of the Ministry of Environment & Forests.
- Sanjaya Sinh, Minister of State (Independent Charge) of the Ministry of Communications.
- Harmohan Dhawan, Minister of State (Independent Charge) of the Ministry of Civil Aviations.

=== Ministers of State ===
- Jagdeep Dhankhar, Minister of state for Parliamentary Affairs.
- Bhakta Charan Das, Minister of State for Railways.
- Kamal Morarka, Minister of State for Prime Minister's Office.
- Jayantilal Shah, Minister of State for Agriculture and Co-operation.
- Lalit Vijay Singh, Minister of State for Defence.
- Subodh Kant Sahay, Minister of State in Ministry of Home Affairs and Ministry of Information and Broadcasting.
- Bhagey Gobardhan, Minister of State in the Ministry of Railways.
- Usha Singh, Minister of State in the Ministry of Tourism.
- Sarwar Hussain, Minister of State in the Ministry of Food and Civil supplies.
- Ram Ji Lal Suman, Minister of State in the Ministry of Labour and Ministry of Welfare.
- Babanrao Dhakne, Minister of State in the Ministry of Energy.
- Basavaraj Patil Anwari, Minister of State in the Ministry of Steel and Mines.
- Ram Bahadur Singh, Minister of State in the Ministry of Agriculture.

=== Deputy Ministers ===
- Shantilal Patel, Deputy Minister in Ministry of Commerce.
- Dasai Chowdhary, Deputy Minister in Ministry of Health and Family Welfare.
- Digvijay Singh, Deputy Minister in Ministry of Finance.
- Jai Parkash, Deputy Minister in Ministry of Petroleum and Chemicals.
