= Shakeelur Rehman =

Indian politician and writer (1931–2016)

Shakeelur Rehman (18 February 1931 – 9 May 2016) was an Indian politician and Urdu-language writer. He served as Minister of Health and Family Welfare in Chandra Shekhar government. His father Khan Bahadur Muhammad Jan was a Government lawyer in British India.

== Life and career ==
He studied at Patna University, where he gained a B.A. with First Class Honors, an M.A. with First Class Honors and a D.Litt. He remained attached to the University of Kashmir as Professor and Head of the Department of Urdu. He also served as Vice-Chancellor of the University of Bihar (1978–1989), Kashmir University (1987) and L.N. Mithila University (1987–1988).

Rehman was elected to 9th Lok Sabha from Darbhanga constituency on Janata Dal ticket. In November 1990, he was one of the 64 MPs who left Janata Dal and formed Chandra Shekhar government. In January 1991, Lok Sabha speaker Rabi Ray disqualified him from Lok Sabha, along with 7 other MPs under the Tenth Schedule to the Constitution of India. He served as Minister of Health and Family Welfare in Chandra Shekhar's government from November 1990 to February 1991.

Shakeelur Rehman had written books on aesthetics and was known as Babe-Jamaliat and more than 50 plays for the stage, TV and radio. He had received the "Ghalib Award", the "Urdu Academy Award", the "National Award" from India and the "Ahmad Nadeem Qasmi Award" from Pakistan for his outstanding contribution to Urdu Literature. He wrote memoir titled Aashram. His near relative Tanwir Phool is a Pakistani author and poet writing in Urdu and English. He has written an article in the quarterly Khayaal (Karachi) about Shakeelur Rehman. Shakeelur Rehman died on 9 May 2016 at Gurgaon in Haryana near New Delhi.
