= WAPCOS Limited =

Indian government corporation

- Company type: Public sector undertaking
- Industry: Water resources; Power; Infrastructure
- Founded: 26 June 1969; 56 years ago
- Headquarters: Kailash, 26, Kasturba Gandhi Marg, New Delhi, India
- Area served: Worldwide
- Key people: Shilpa Shinde (Chairman & Managing Director)
- Services: Consultancy
- Revenue: ₹13.37 billion (US$140 million) (2021)
- Operating income: ₹13.14 billion (US$140 million) (2021)
- Total assets: ₹26.70 billion (US$280 million) (2021)
- Total equity: ₹6.17 billion (US$64 million) (2021)
- Owner: Government of India
- Website: wapcos.co.in

WAPCOS Limited, earlier known as Water and Power Consultancy Services (India) Limited, is an Indian consultancy service provider under the ownership of the Government of India and administrative control of the Ministry of Jal Shakti. The firm provides consultancy services in the fields of water resources, power and infrastructure. Launched in 1969, it is a "Mini Ratna" company with several projects across India, Asia and Africa.

== History ==
WAPCOS is a "Mini Ratna-I" Public Sector Enterprise under the aegis of the Ministry of Jal Shakti, Department of Water Resources, River Development and Ganga Rejuvenation. Incorporated on June 26, 1969, under the Companies Act, 1956, WAPCOS is a technology-driven consultancy and Engineering, Procurement, and Construction (EPC) organization. The company has a strong domestic and international presence across the Water, Power, and Infrastructure sectors. With extensive experience and technical expertise, WAPCOS is fully equipped to undertake consultancy and EPC projects of any scale and complexity within its areas of operation.

== Services ==
WAPCOS provides wide range of services in the areas of infrastructure development, water resources and power generation. As a consultancy, some of its activities include pre-feasibility studies and feasibility studies, master plans and regional development plans, detailed engineering reports, commissioning and testing, operations and maintenance and capacity building and human resource development in its areas of competence. WAPCOS also provides commissioning services for developmental projects in India and abroad.

== Global Presence ==
WAPCOS has successfully completed/ongoing consultancy assignments in countries covering Asia, Africa, Eurasia, CIS, South America, North America, Oceania & Pacific Islands providing consultancy services in different countries including, Angola, Afghanistan, Belize, Benin, Bhutan, Burundi, Botswana, Cambodia, Cameroon, Central African Republic, Chad, Cuba, DR Congo, Eswatini, Ethiopia, Fiji, Gambia, Ghana, Guinea Conakry, Indonesia, Kenya, Lao PDR, Lesotho, Liberia, Madagascar, Malawi, Maldives, Mongolia, Mozambique, Myanmar, Nepal, Niger, Nigeria, Nicaragua, Papua New Guinea, Rwanda, Senegal, Sierra Leone, Sri Lanka, Suriname, Tanzania, Tajikistan, Togo, Timor Leste, USA, Uganda, Uzbekistan, Vietnam, Yemen, Zambia, Zimbabwe
