= National Institute of Hydrology =

Indian government body

Coordinates: 29°52′8″N 77°53′40″E

National Institute of Hydrology (NIH) is an autonomous society under Ministry of Water Resources, River Development & Ganga Rejuvenation, Government of India and has been functioning as a research Institute in the area of hydrology and water resources in the country since 1979 in Roorkee City. Main objectives of the institute are to undertake, support, promote and coordinate systematic and scientific research work in all aspects of Hydrology and Water Resources.

The institute acts as a centre of excellence for transfer of technology, human resources development and institutional development in specialized areas of hydrology and conducts user defined, demand-driven research through collaboration with relevant national and international organizations. The institute vigorously pursues capacity development activities by organizing training programs for field engineers, scientists, researchers, NGOs etc. The institute is focusing studies and R&D in the thrust areas of impact of climate change on water resources; integrated water resources management; groundwater modeling and management; flood and drought management; regional hydrology; hydrology of extremes; reservoir/lake sedimentation; watershed hydrology; and water quality assessment in specific areas.

The institute has its headquarters at Roorkee (Uttarakhand, India). It has Seven Regional centres at Belagavi, Jodhpur , Jammu,Kakinada and Bhopal and two Centres for Flood Management Studies at Guwahati and Patna. The NIH has a partnership with the Indian Institutes of Technology (IIT).

== Objectives ==
NIH carries out basic, applied, and strategic research in hydrology and water resources. It aims to develop methodologies for the optimum utilization of water resources, to develop methodologies for water and environmental sustainability, to propagate emerging technologies in water resources development, to protect the society from water related hazards, and to develop mass awareness for water conservation and optimum utilization.

The specific objectives of NIH are as follows:

(1) To undertake, promote, assist, and coordinate systematic research and work in all aspects of hydrological sciences and other water-related disciplines, and to publish the findings and results of research and investigations through appropriate offline and online media.

(2) To carry out modeling and other advanced techniques to aid in the resolution of pressing societal issues concerning water quantity and quality, including floods, droughts, groundwater, sedimentation, salinization, pollution, and climate change.

(3) To research and develop novel, cost-effective tools, techniques, methodologies, procedures, software, and field and laboratory instrumentation, to aid in the performance of its mission.

(4) To establish and maintain a live, dynamic and committed resource base in terms of staff, laboratories, equipment, libraries, and specialized expertise in hydrological sciences and other water-related fields.

(5) To propagate across society-at-large the application of emerging technologies in water resources development and management.

(6) To develop, maintain, and continuously improve its online presence to ensure the widest dissemination of its research.

(7) To collaborate with appropriate national and international organizations engaged in research in hydrological sciences.

(8) To carry out other activities that are considered by the NIH Society to be necessary, incidental, or conducive to the attainment of its mission.
