= Manubhai Kotadia =

Indian politician (1936–2003)

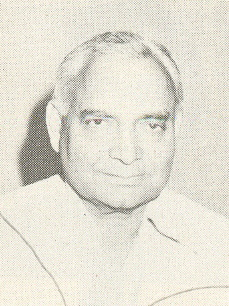

Minister of Water Resource & Minister of Surface Transport
- In office 21 November 1990 – 25 April 1991
- Prime Minister: Chandra Shekhar

Minister of State for Water Resources
- In office 5 December 1989 – 5 November 1990
- Prime Minister: V P Singh

Minister of Agriculture and Power in Government of Gujarat
- In office 18 June 1975 – 12 March 1977

Member of Parliament, Lok Sabha
- In office 1989–1991
- Succeeded by: Dileep Sanghani
- Constituency: Amreli, Gujarat

Personal details
- Born: 31 July 1936 Kubada, Amreli District, British India
- Died: 23 July 2003 (aged 66) New Delhi, Delhi, India
- Party: Janata Dal
- Spouse: Hansaben Kotadia
- Children: 2 sons and 1 daughter

Manubhai Kotadia (31 July 1936 – 23 July 2003) was an Indian politician. He was elected to 9th Lok Sabha in 1989 on Janata Dal ticket from Amreli constituency. He was Minister of Agriculture and Power in Gujarat. He also served as Minister of State, Water Resources from December 1989 to November 1990 in VP Singh government.

In November 1990, he was one of the 64 MPs who left Janata Dal and formed Chandra Shekhar government. He was Minister of Water Resources with additional charge of Ministry of Surface Transport in Chandra Shekhar government from November 1990 to April 1991.
