= Krishna River Management Board =

Indian autonomous body

Krishna River Management Board KRMB
- Website: https://krmb.gov.in/krmb/home

Krishna River Management Board (KRMB) is an autonomous body established as per Andhra Pradesh Reorganization Act, 2014 under the administrative control of Ministry of Jal Shakti to manage and regulate the waters in Krishna Basin in the states of Andhra Pradesh and Telangana. The headquarters of the KRMB shall be in Andhra Pradesh.

== Functions ==
KRMB shall have jurisdiction and shall perform the functions as per the provisions of sub-section (1) of section 85 of the Andhra Pradesh Reorganisation Act 2014, such as administration, operation, maintenance and regulation. After nearly 7 years, the KRMB is notified by the central govt as an autonomous body and its project wise functions are identified. Since 2015, water available in the Krishna basin of the both states in a water year is shared in the ratio of 512:299 between AP and Telangana states as per the understanding between the parties.

== Sources of Revenue ==
According to AP Re-Organization Act, 2014 section 86, para 2, The Government of the successor States shall at all times provide the necessary funds to the Board to meet all expenses (including the salaries and allowances of the staff) required for the discharge of its functions and such amounts shall be apportioned between the States concerned in such proportion as the Central Government may, having regard to the benefits to each of the said States, specify.

== See also ==
- Krishna Water Disputes Tribunal
