= Prabhudas Patel =

Indian politician (born 1914)

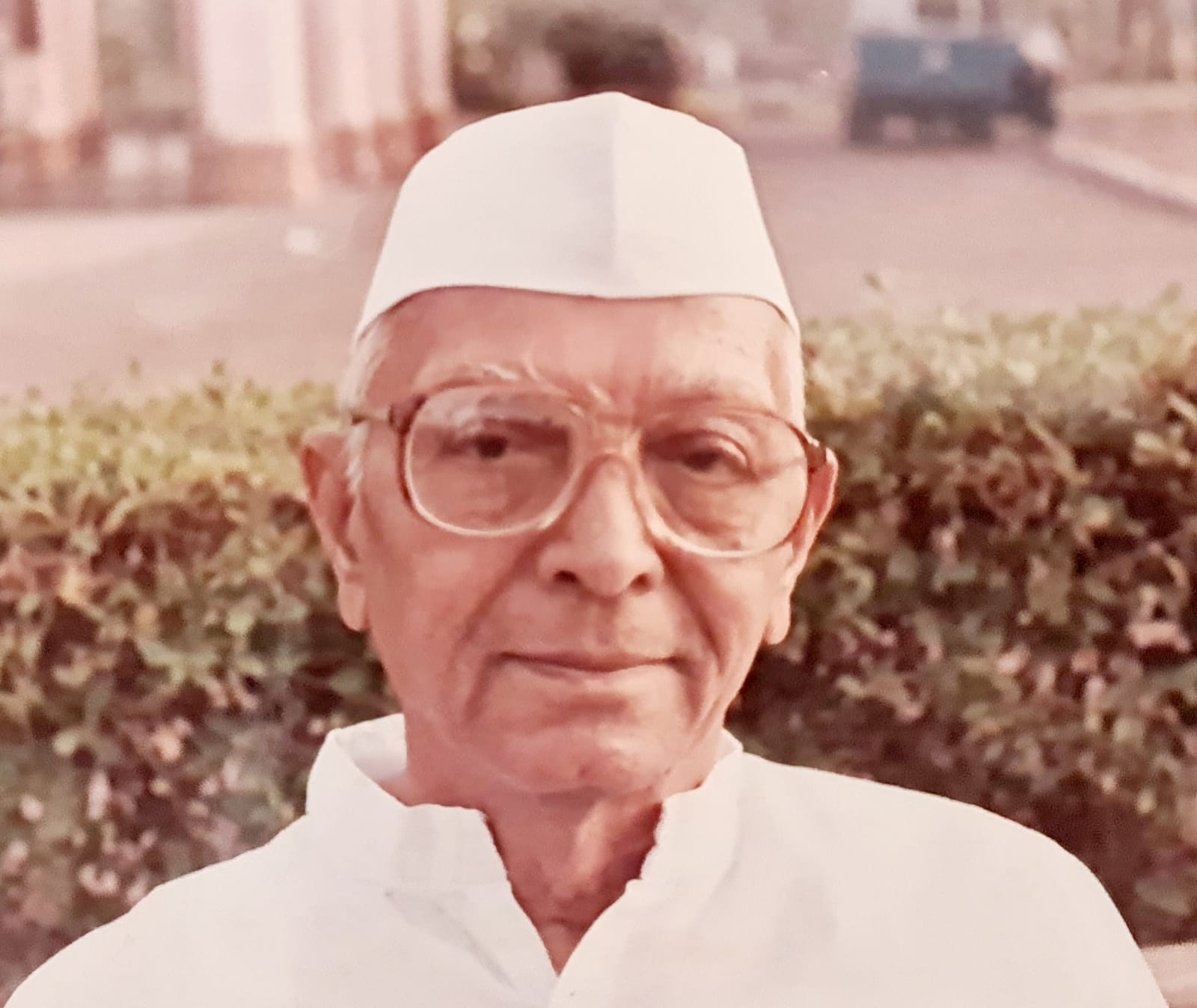

Deputy Minister of Agriculture and Irrigation
- In office 23 October 1974 – 1977
- Prime Minister: Indira Gandhi

Member of Parliament, Lok Sabha
- In office 1971–1977
- Constituency: Dabhoi, Gujarat

Personal details
- Born: Prabhudas Khushalbhai Patel; 24 August 1914 Alindra, Kheda district, Bombay Presidency, British India
- Party: Indian National Congress
- Other political affiliations: Swatantra Party; Indian National Congress (R); Janata Party
- Spouse: Savitaben Patel
- Children: 3
- Education: Baroda College
- Occupation: Agriculturist, politician

Prabhudas Khushalbhai Patel (born 24 August 1914) was an Indian independence activist, politician, administrator, agriculturist and a pioneer of the cooperative movement in India. He was Deputy Minister of Agriculture and Irrigation in the Government of India and a Member of Parliament (Lok Sabha) from Dabhoi in Gujarat.

== Early life and education ==
Patel was born on 24 August 1914 in Alindra, Kheda district, in the Bombay Presidency, to an agriculturist family. His father was Khushalbhai L. Patel. He completed his inter-arts education at Baroda College (now the Maharaja Sayajirao University of Baroda).

== Political career ==
Patel was a member of the Indian National Congress and, in 1947–48, was appointed the first secretary of the Baroda District Congress Committee. He was active in district, state and national politics. He later left the Congress over internal differences and was associated with the Swatantra Party for a brief period. After the Congress split of 1969, he joined the Indian National Congress (R).

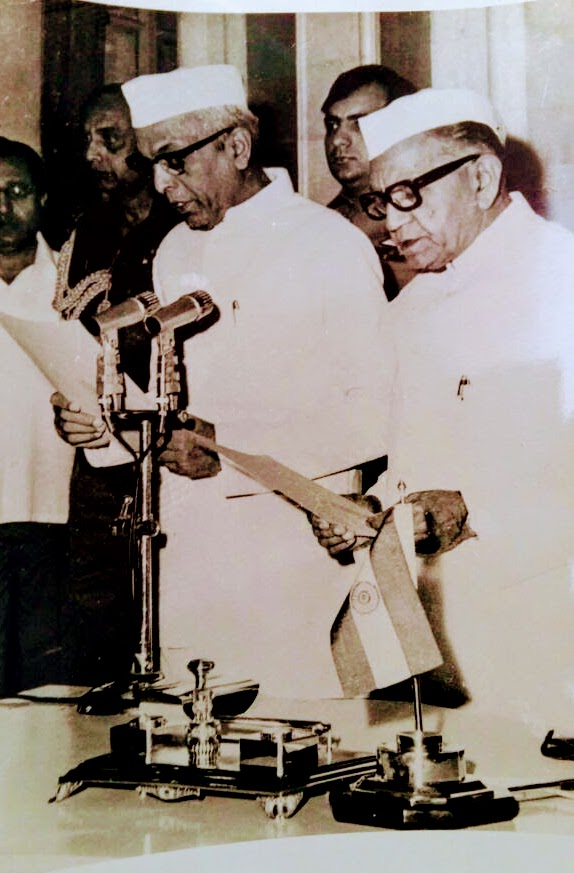
Prabhudas Patel taking oath as Deputy Minister on 23 October 1974 at Rashtrapati Bhavan in New Delhi.

In the 1971 Indian general election, Patel was elected to the 5th Lok Sabha from Dabhoi as the Congress candidate, polling 163,779 votes (54.14%) and defeating Manubhai Motibhai Patel of the Indian National Congress (Organisation) by a margin of 29,675 votes. In October 1974, he was appointed Deputy Minister of Agriculture and Irrigation in the government headed by Indira Gandhi.

In 1977 he resigned from the ministry and from the primary membership of the Indian National Congress in protest against the Emergency and the internal workings of the party. He was thereafter associated with the Janata Party. In the 1980 Indian general election he contested the Baroda seat as the Janata Party candidate, polling 169,784 votes, and lost to Ranjitsinh Gaekwad of the Indian National Congress (I) by 95,493 votes.

== Cooperative and civic work ==
Patel had a particular interest in the cooperative movement. He served as chairman of the Baroda District School Board, the Baroda Central People's Co-operative Bank Ltd. and the Baroda People's Co-operative Bank Ltd., and was associated with various cooperative, educational and cultural organisations in Gujarat.

== Personal life ==
Patel was married to Savitaben Patel; they had two sons and one daughter. He lived in Raopura, Baroda.
