= Janeshwar Mishra =

Indian politician

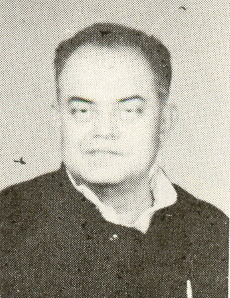

Union Minister of Petroleum and Natural Gas
- In office 9 June 1997 – 19 March 1998
- Prime Minister: Inder Kumar Gujral
- Deputy: T. R. Baalu
- Preceded by: Inder Kumar Gujral
- Succeeded by: Vazhappady K. Ramamurthy

Union Minister of Water Resources
- In office 29 June 1996 – 9 June 1997
- Prime Minister: H. D. Deve Gowda; Inder Kumar Gujral
- Preceded by: H. D. Deve Gowda
- Succeeded by: Sis Ram Ola

Union Minister of Railways
- In office 21 November 1990 – 21 June 1991
- Prime Minister: Chandra Shekhar
- Deputy: Bhakta Charan Das
- Preceded by: George Fernandes
- Succeeded by: C. K. Jaffer Sharief

Union Minister of State (Independent Charge) of Communications
- In office 23 April 1990 – 5 November 1990
- Prime Minister: Vishwanath Pratap Singh
- Preceded by: K. P. Unnikrishnan
- Succeeded by: Vishwanath Pratap Singh

Union Minister of State (Independent Charge) of Shipping and Transport
- In office 30 July 1979 – 14 January 1980
- Prime Minister: Charan Singh
- Preceded by: Chand Ram
- Succeeded by: Anant Sharma

Member of Parliament, Lok Sabha
- In office 1989–1991
- Preceded by: Vishwanath Pratap Singh
- Succeeded by: Saroj Dubey
- Constituency: Allahabad
- In office 1977–1980
- Preceded by: Hemwati Nandan Bahuguna
- Succeeded by: Vishwanath Pratap Singh
- Constituency: Allahabad
- In office 1969–1971
- Preceded by: Vijaya Lakshmi Pandit
- Succeeded by: Vishwanath Pratap Singh
- Constituency: Phulpur

Personal details
- Born: 5 August 1933 Ballia, United Provinces, British India
- Died: 22 January 2010 (aged 76) Allahabad, Uttar Pradesh, India
- Party: Samajwadi Party
- Spouse: Gangotri Devi
- Children: 2

Janeshwar Mishra (5 August 1933 – 22 January 2010) was a politician from Samajwadi Party. He was a member of the Parliament of India and also represented Uttar Pradesh in the Rajya Sabha, the upper house of the Indian Parliament. He was known as Chhote Lohia (Lohia Junior) for his commitment towards socialist ideology, in reference to Ram Manohar Lohia.

== Biography ==
He was born in Shubhanathahin village in Ballia on 5 August 1933. He was B.A. and LL.B. He was president of the student union of Purna nand Inter College and attended Allahabad University as well. While still a student, he joined the Samajwadi Yuvajan Sabha and met Dr Ram Manohar Lohia and Raj Narain.

== Lok Sabha ==
He represented the Prayagraj Lok Sabha constituency three times. He first became the member of Lok Sabha by defeating K D Malviya, the sitting Petroleum Minister in Indira Gandhi Cabinet from Phulpur constituency in Prayagraj district in 1969–70. Subsequently, he defeated V.P.Singh by almost 90,000 votes from Prayagraj Lok Sabha constituency in 1977 elections. He served as a Member of Sixth Lok Sabha, 1977–80, and as Member of Ninth Lok Sabha, 1989–91.

== Union Minister ==
He served in the governments of Morarji Desai, Chaudhary Charan Singh, V P Singh, Chandrashekhar, H D Deve Gowda and I K Gujral. He served as union minister of state from 1977. He also held portfolios of Petroleum, Water Resources Chemicals and Fertilisers, Energy, Shipping and Transport, and Communication and Railways. He served as the minister of state for Railways in the Chandra Shekhar government during 1990–91. He was Railways Minister in the Chandra Shekhar government in 1990–91.

== Rajya Sabha ==
He was elected to Rajya Sabha in 1996. He was re-elected to Rajya Sabha in 2000 and 2006.

| Position | Party | Constituency | From | To | Tenure |
|---|---|---|---|---|---|
| Member of Parliament, Rajya Sabha (1st Term) | SP | Uttar Pradesh | 3 April 1994 | 2 April 2000 | 5 years, 365 days |
| Member of Parliament, Rajya Sabha (2nd Term) | SP | Uttar Pradesh | 3 April 2000 | 2 April 2006 | 5 years, 364 days |
| Member of Parliament, Rajya Sabha (3rd Term) | SP | Uttar Pradesh | 3 April 2006 | 22 January 2010 | 3 years, 294 days |

== Death ==
He died due to cardiac arrest on 22 January 2010 at Tej Bahadur Sapru Hospital in Allahabad. At the time of death, he was the Samajwadi Party's vice president and member of the Rajya Sabha. He is survived by two daughters, one of them being Mina Tiwari.

== Influence ==
Former Chief Minister of Uttar Pradesh, Akhilesh Yadav credits Janeshwar Mishra with initiating him into politics.
