= B. Shankaranand =

Indian politician (1925–2009)

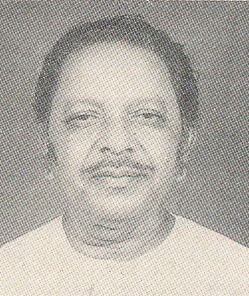

MP
- In office 1967-1996
- Preceded by: V. L. Patil
- Succeeded by: Ratnamala Savanur
- Constituency: Chikkodi

Personal details
- Born: 19 October 1925 Kanagali, Chikodi, Belgaum, Karnataka State, British India
- Died: 20 November 2009 (aged 84) Belgaum
- Party: Indian National Congress
- Spouse: Kamala Devi
- Children: 2 Sons, 6 Daughters

B. Shankaranand (1925 – 2009) was a congress leader from Karnataka and minister in government of India.

He held the following portfolios in the Union Cabinet:

| Position | Dates |
|---|---|
| Deputy Minister of Parliamentary Affairs | 16 March 1971 to 24 March 1977 |
| Minister of Health & Family Welfare | 16 January 1980 to 31 October 1984 |
| Minister of Education | 14 January 1980 to 17 October 1980 |
| Minister of Irrigation & Power | 31 December 1984 to 25 September 1985 |
| Minister of Water Resources | 25 September 1985 to 21 August 1987 |
| Minister of Water Resources | 25 June 1988 to 2 December 1989 |
| Minister of Law & Justice | 25 June 1988 to 2 December 1989 |
| Minister of Petroleum & Natural Gas | 21 June 1991 to 17 January 1993 |
| Minister of Health & Family Welfare | 18 January 1993 to 22 December 1994 |

He worked as a cabinet minister under the Prime Ministership of Smt. Indira Gandhi, Shri Rajiv Gandhi and Shri P.V. Narasimha Rao.

He headed the first ever Joint Parliamentary Committee (JPC) formed to investigate into the Bofors deal which gave its report on 26 April 1988.

He has represented Chikkodi (Lok Sabha constituency) for 29 years from 1967 to 1996, winning 7 times consecutively from the same place in his political career, creating a record of sorts.
