= Kedar Nath Singh (Uttar Pradesh politician) =

Indian Politician (1928-1999)

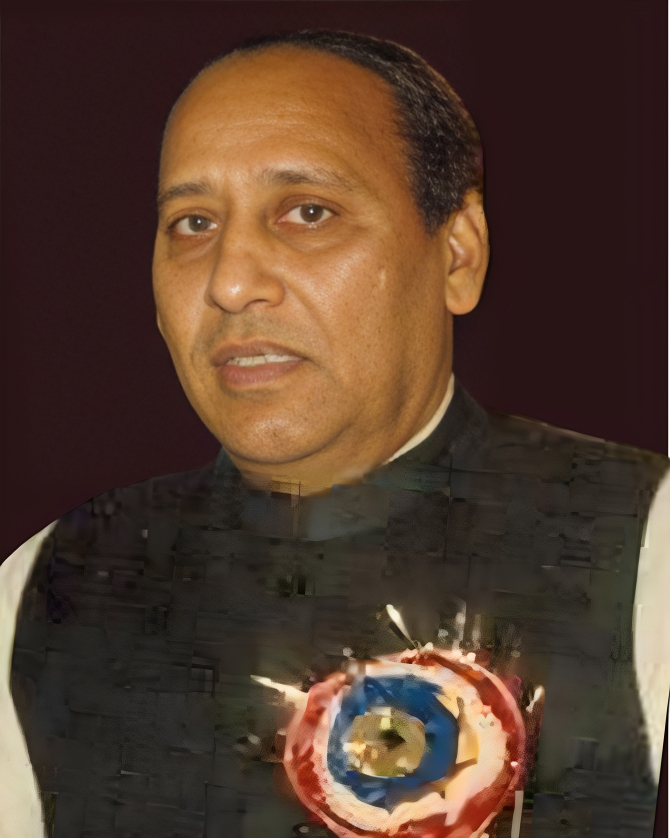

Personal details
- Born: Kedar Nath Singh; 1 January 1928 Balua
- Died: 1 July 1999 (aged 71) Sultanpur, India
- Other political affiliations: Indian National Congress (1971–1999)
- Spouse: Soneraji Devi (m. 1950; died 2017)
- Children: 4
- Education: Allahabad University (M.Com., LLB)

Kedar Nath Singh (1928–1999) was an Indian politician of the Indian National Congress who served in both houses of the Parliament of India. He was elected to the Lok Sabha from Sultanpur in 1971 and served in the government of Indira Gandhi as Union Deputy Minister for Parliamentary Affairs from 1971 to 1974 and for Agriculture and Irrigation from 1974 to 1977. He later served for six years in the Rajya Sabha and was elected a general secretary of the Indian National Congress in 1984.

Singh was also involved in the Quit India Movement and was imprisoned twice for his participation. In 1972–73, he founded the Kamla Nehru Institute of Science and Technology in Sultanpur, Uttar Pradesh.

== Career and politics ==
Singh was born in a farmer family of the remote village Balua, located approximately 65 km from District Sultanpur, Uttar Pradesh. His parents were Late Thakur Ram Pal Singh and Jagwanti Singh.

Singh completed his higher secondary education in Sultanpur, followed by a bachelor's degree from Udai Pratap College in Varanasi and M.Com. and LL.B. degrees from Allahabad University in 1955. He took active part in students politics led by Indian Students Congress and jailed twice for participation in Quit India Movement of 1942. Through his continuous struggle for liberation against poverty and his sacrifice for the poor Sri Singh maintained his untiring efforts for autonomy of the university and students participation in social and political movement. He fought for the social justice and welfare of the people. He got his political status as Member of Parliament in 1971. He was inducted as Union Deputy Minister for Parliamentary Affairs (1971–1974) and Agriculture and Irrigation 1974–1977 in the Central Government headed by Indira Gandhi.

In 1971, he was elected to the Lok Sabha from Sultanpur winning the 1971 Indian general election in Uttar Pradesh representing the Indian National Congress. He remained MP and member of union cabinet of Indira Gandhi. In 1984, he was elected Indian National Congress general secretary. He also served as a Rajya Sabha MP for six years.

== Founder of educational institutions ==
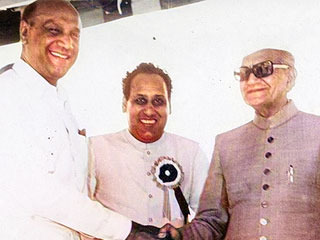
At Foundation of Kamla Nehru Institute Sultanpur UP

In 1972–73, he founded an educational Institute "Kamla Nehru Institute of Science and Technology" at Sultanpur, Uttar Pradesh. Presently they known as famous Engineering, PG College and School Education of Sultanpur Uttar Pradesh. Kamla Nehru Institute of Technology (KNIT) was initially established as the Faculty of Technology in the year 1976 by Kamla Nehru Memorial Trust. It was taken over by the Government of Uttar Pradesh in 1979 with a view to developing a full-fledged Engineering Institute in the Eastern UP region better known as the Awadh region. Later, in 1983 it was registered as a separate society and renamed as the Kamla Nehru Institute of Technology.

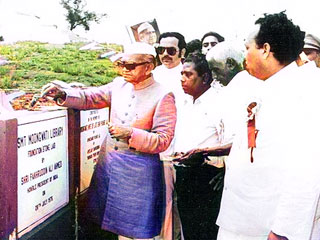
At Foundation of Kamla Nehru Institute Sultanpur

Institutes such as Kamla Nehru Institute of Physical and Social Sciences (KNIPSS) Sultanpur and Kamla Nehru Institute of Child Education Sultanpur UP were also established.

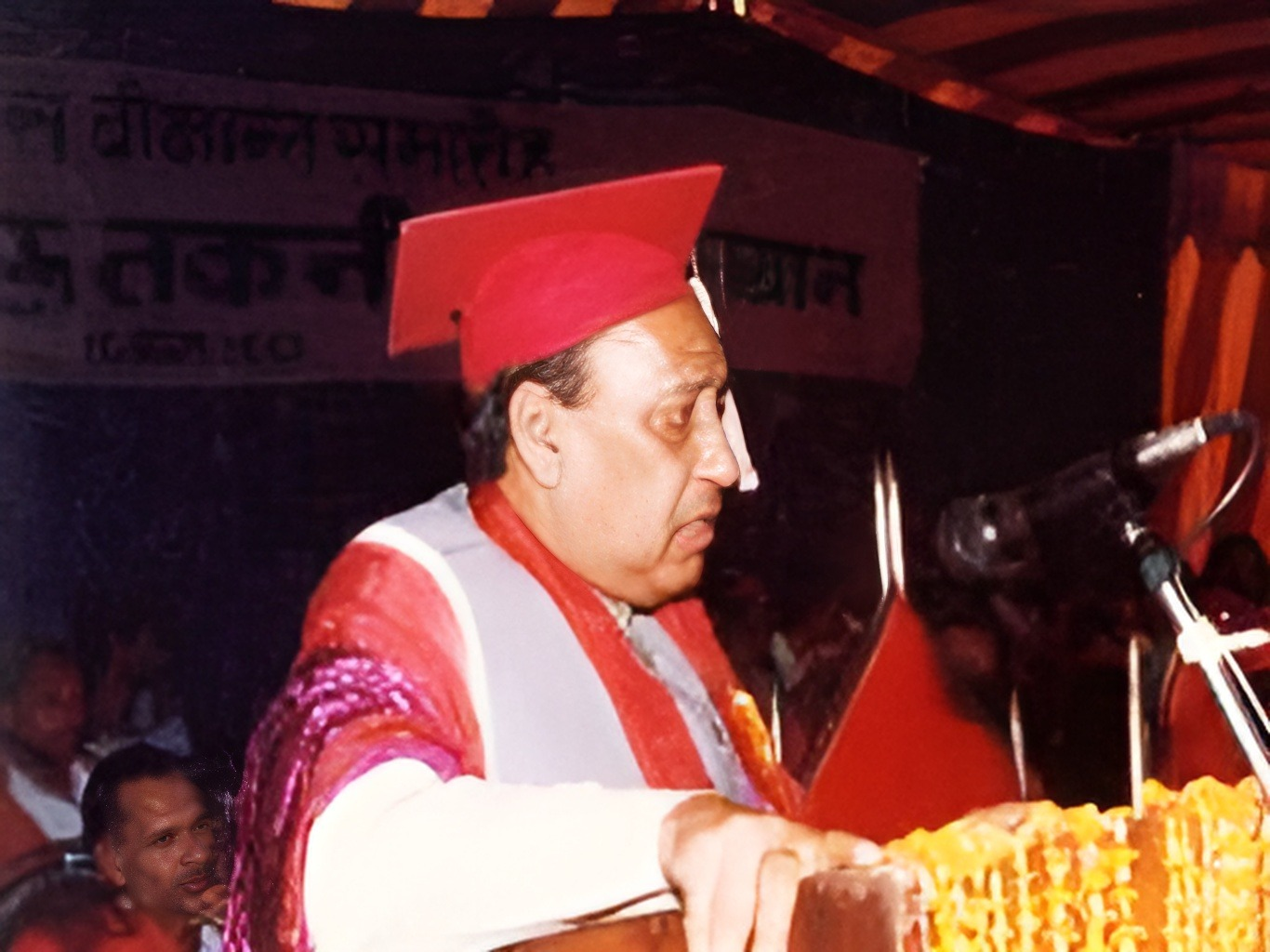
Kamla Nehru Institute - Convocation Ceremony

== Family and legacy ==
Singh was married to Soneraji Devi. He died on 1 July 1999, leaving three sons—Arvind Singh, Vinod Singh, and Ashok Singh—and one daughter, Sushma Singh.
