= 2018 elections in India =

Elections in India
- 2018

Elections in the Republic of India in 2018 included by-elections to the Lok Sabha, elections to the Rajya Sabha, elections to of eight states and numerous other by-elections to state legislative assemblies, councils and local bodies.

The elections were widely considered crucial to the ruling National Democratic Alliance and the opposition United Progressive Alliance for the upcoming general elections in 2019. In seven of the eight states that went to polls this year, the Bharatiya Janata Party was in direct contest with the Indian National Congress. Further, the election results in the states of Karnataka, Madhya Pradesh, Telangana, Chhattisgarh, Mizoram and Rajasthan are considered a barometer of the pulse of the public before the general elections. Elections to the upper house where the ruling National Democratic Alliance does not command a majority are expected to strengthen its position.

== Background ==
=== Political system ===
According to the Constitution of India, elections should take place to the parliament and state legislative assemblies every five years, unless an emergency is under operation. Further, any vacancy caused by death or resignation must be filled through an election within six months of occurrence of such vacancy. The elections to the lower houses (in Parliament and in the states) use first past the post system - the candidate with a plurality of the votes wins the election.

Elections to one-third of the seats of the upper house of the Parliament - the Rajya Sabha are conducted every two years. The members of the upper house are elected indirectly by the state legislative assemblies on the basis of proportional representation. Members to the state legislative councils (in states which have an upper house) are elected indirectly through local bodies.

All the elections at the central and state level are conducted by the Election Commission of India while local body elections are conducted by state election commissions.

== Parliamentary by-election ==
S.no	Date	Constituency	State/UT	MP before election	Party before election	Elected MP	Party after election
1	29 January 2018	Alwar	Rajasthan	Mahant Chandnath	Bharatiya Janata Party	Karan Singh Yadav	Indian National Congress
2	29 January 2018	Ajmer	Rajasthan	Sanwar Lal Jat	Bharatiya Janata Party	Raghu Sharma	Indian National Congress
3	29 January 2018	Uluberia	West Bengal	Sultan Ahmed	All India Trinamool Congress	Sajda Ahmed	All India Trinamool Congress
4	11 March 2018	Gorakhpur	Uttar Pradesh	Yogi Adityanath	Bharatiya Janata Party	Praveen Kumar Nishad	Samajwadi Party
5	11 March 2018	Phulpur	Uttar Pradesh	Keshav Prasad Maurya	Bharatiya Janata Party	Nagendra Singh Patel	Samajwadi Party
6	11 March 2018	Araria	Bihar	Mohammed Taslimuddin	Rashtriya Janata Dal	Sarfaraz Alam	Rashtriya Janata Dal
7	28 May 2018	Bhandara–Gondiya	Maharashtra	Nana Patole	Bharatiya Janata Party	Madhukar Kukde	Nationalist Congress Party
8	28 May 2018	Palghar	Maharashtra	Chintaman Vanaga	Bharatiya Janata Party	Rajendra Gavit	Bharatiya Janata Party
9	28 May 2018	Nagaland	Nagaland	Neiphiu Rio	Naga People's Front	Tokheho Yepthomi	Nationalist Democratic Progressive Party
10	28 May 2018	Kairana	Uttar Pradesh	Hukum Singh	Bharatiya Janata Party	Begum Tabassum Hasan	Rashtriya Lok Dal
11	3 November 2018	Bellary	Karnataka	B. Sriramulu	Bharatiya Janata Party	V. S. Ugrappa	Indian National Congress
12	3 November 2018	Shimoga	Karnataka	B. S. Yediyurappa	Bharatiya Janata Party	B. Y. Raghavendra	Bharatiya Janata Party
13	3 November 2018	Mandya	Karnataka	C. S. Puttaraju	Janata Dal (Secular)	L. R. Shivarame Gowda	Janata Dal (Secular)

- Alwar (Lok Sabha constituency): Elections were held on 29 January to elect a new member of parliament after the death of the incumbent Mahant Chandnath of the Bharatiya Janata Party. Both the Bharatiya Janata Party and Indian National Congress fielded candidates from the yadav community. 61.77% of the total 18,27,936 voters participated in the election. For the first time in the country, the election commission placed candidates' photos next to their name to help voters identify the candidates. In what was seen as a body blow to the state government, the INC wrested control of the seat from the BJP, with its candidate Karan Singh Yadav winning the seat by a margin of 1,96,496 votes.
- Ajmer (Lok Sabha constituency): Elections were held on 29 January to elect a new member of parliament after the death of the incumbent Sanwar Lal Jat of the Bharatiya Janata Party. 65% of the total 18.43 lakh voters participated in the election. For the first time in the country, the election commission placed candidates' photos next to their name to help voters identify the candidates. In what was seen as a body blow to the state government, the INC wrested control of the seat from the BJP, its candidate Raghu Sharma won by a margin of 84,238 votes.
- Uluberia (Lok Sabha constituency): Elections were held on 29 January to elect a new member of parliament after the death of Mohammedan Sporting Club's president and All India Trinamool Congress M.P Sultan Ahmed. Trinamool Congress candidate Sajda Ahmed won Uluberia Lok Sabha seat by defeating BJP candidate Anupam Mallick by 4,74,023 votes.

=== March ===
2018 winner	2014 winner	State	Constituency	Note
SP	BJP	Uttar Pradesh	Gorakhpur	Elections were held on March 11 to elect a new member of Parliament after the incumbent member Yogi Adityanath resigned from the post after he was appointed the Chief Minister of Uttar Pradesh.
SP	BJP	Uttar Pradesh	Phulpur	Elections were held on March 14 to elect a new member of Parliament after the incumbent member Keshav Prasad Maurya resigned from the post after he was appointed the Deputy Chief Minister of Uttar Pradesh.
RJD	RJD	Bihar	Araria	The constituency fell vacant after the death of RJD MP Mohammed Taslimuddin.

=== May ===
4 parliamentary seats were contested on 28 May 2018. The counting of votes took place on May 31. This election saw the ruling BJP party lose their majority in the lower house of the Indian Parliament.

2018 winner	2014 winner	State	Constituency	Note
RLD	BJP	Uttar Pradesh	Kairana	The constituency fell vacant after the death of BJP MP Hukum Singh.
NCP	BJP	Maharashtra	Bhandara-Gondiya	Nana Patole quit as the BJP MP and resigned from the ruling party to return to the Congress earlier this year, necessitating the by-election.
BJP	BJP	Maharashtra	Palghar	Palghar seat in north Konkan fell vacant after sitting BJP MP Chintaman Vanga died on 30 January following a heart attack.
NDPP	NPF	Nagaland	Nagaland	The by-election was necessitated after NDPP's Neiphiu Rio resigned to take on the role of Nagaland chief minister.

November

Three parliamentary seats had been contested on 3 November 2018 in Karnataka. Results were declared on 6 November 2018.

2018 winner	2014 winner	State	Constituency	Note
INC	BJP	Karnataka	Bellary	Bellary Lok Sabha constituency was vacated due to Sriramulu being elected to the Karnataka Legislative Assembly in May 2018.
JDS	JDS	Karnataka	Mandya	This seat was vacated after sitting MP had joined Karnataka Government as Minister for minor irrigation.
BJP	BJP	Karnataka	Shivamogga	Shivamogga constituency was vacated; B. S. Yeddyurappa quit after being elected to the Karnataka Legislative Assembly in May 2018.

== Legislative assembly elections ==
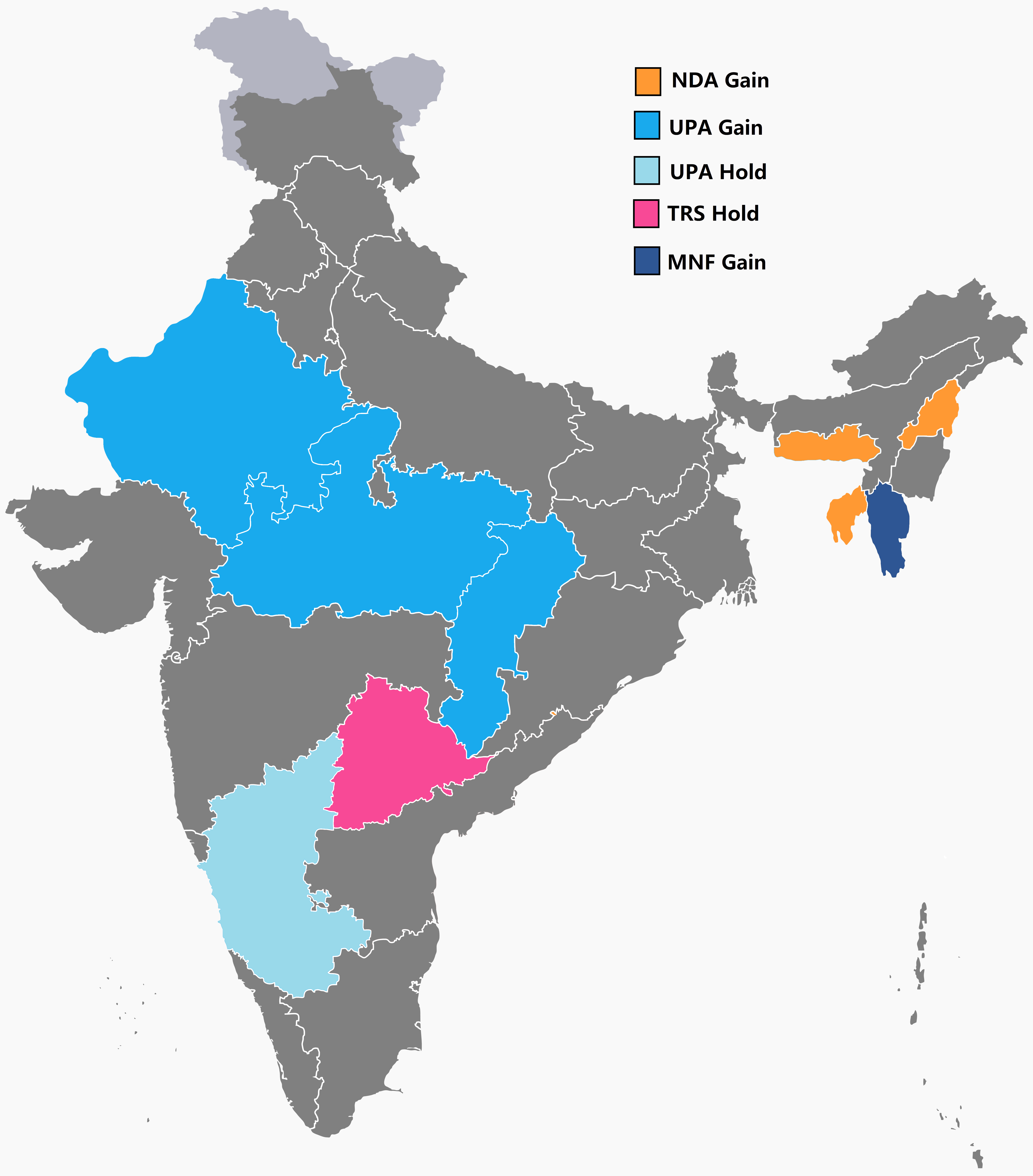
2018 Indian election result map

Date(s)	State	Government before	Chief Minister before	Government after	Elected Chief Minister
18 February 2018	Tripura	Communist Party of India (Marxist)	Manik Sarkar	Bharatiya Janata Party	Biplab Kumar Deb
27 February 2018	Meghalaya	Indian National Congress	Mukul Sangma	National People's Party	Conrad Sangma
27 February 2018	Meghalaya	Indian National Congress	Mukul Sangma	United Democratic Party	Conrad Sangma
27 February 2018	Meghalaya	Indian National Congress	Mukul Sangma	People's Democratic Front	Conrad Sangma
27 February 2018	Meghalaya	Indian National Congress	Mukul Sangma	Bharatiya Janata Party	Conrad Sangma
27 February 2018	Nagaland	Naga People's Front	T. R. Zeliang	Nationalist Democratic Progressive Party	Neiphiu Rio
27 February 2018	Nagaland	Naga People's Front	T. R. Zeliang	Bharatiya Janata Party	Neiphiu Rio
12 May 2018	Karnataka	Indian National Congress	Siddaramaiah	Indian National Congress	H. D. Kumaraswamy
12 May 2018	Karnataka	Indian National Congress	Siddaramaiah	Janata Dal (Secular)	H. D. Kumaraswamy
12 & 20 November 2018	Chhattisgarh	Bharatiya Janata Party	Raman Singh	Indian National Congress	Bhupesh Baghel
28 November 2018	Madhya Pradesh	Bharatiya Janata Party	Shivraj Singh Chouhan	Indian National Congress	Kamal Nath
28 November 2018	Mizoram	Indian National Congress	Lal Thanhawla	Mizo National Front	Zoramthanga
7 December 2018	Rajasthan	Bharatiya Janata Party	Vasundhra Raje	Indian National Congress	Ashok Gehlot
7 December 2018	Telangana	Telangana Rashtra Samithi	K. Chandrasekhar Rao	Telangana Rashtra Samithi	K. Chandrashekar Rao

=== Tripura ===
Elections were held in Tripura on 18 February 2018 in 59 out of 60 constituencies of the Legislative Assembly. The Left Front led by Manik Sarkar sought re-election, having governed Tripura since the 1998 election. The region in general had been under the political control of the Communist Party for 25 years prior to the election, leading to the region being dubbed a "red holdout". The incumbent Left Front government was defeated after 25 years of office, with the Bharatiya Janata Party and Indigenous Peoples Front of Tripura winning a large majority of seats. The Indian National Congress, which was the second largest party in the 2013 election, lost all its seats and most of its vote share.

Parties and coalitions	Popular vote			Seats	
Parties and coalitions	Votes	%	±pp	Won	+/−
Bharatiya Janata Party (BJP)	999,093	43.0		36	▲36
Communist Party of India (Marxist) (CPM)	992,575	42.7		16	▼33
Indigenous Peoples Front of Tripura (IPFT)	173,603	7.5		8	▲8
Indian National Congress (INC)	41,325	1.8		0	▼10
Communist Party of India (CPI)	19,352	0.8		0	▼1
Revolutionary Socialist Party (RSP)	17,568	0.8		0	Steady
Indigenous Nationalist Party of Twipra (INPT)	16,255	0.7		0	Steady
All India Forward Bloc (AIFB)	13,115	0.6		0	Steady
All India Trinamool Congress (AITC)	6,989	0.3		0	Steady
Independents (IND)				0	Steady
Other parties and coalitions				0	Steady
None of the Above (NOTA)					
Vacant seat				1	▲1
Total		100.00		60	±0

=== Meghalaya ===
Elections were held in Meghalaya on 27 February 2018 to elect 59 of 60 members to the Legislative Assembly. The incumbent Indian National Congress government controlled the state in a coalition with smaller parties prior to the election, and sought to retain office. The elections resulted in a hung assembly with no single party or alliance getting the requisite majority of 31 seats in the Vidhan Sabha. Conrad Sangma, leader of the National People's Party, announced that he would form a government with the support of the United Democratic Party and other regional parties. He was sworn in as the Chief Minister, along with eleven other ministers.

Party	Popular vote			Seats		
Party	Votes	%	±pp	Contested	Won	+/−
Indian National Congress (INC)	447,472	28.5		59	21	▼8
National People's Party (NPP)	323,500	20.6		52	19	▲17
United Democratic Party (UDP)	182,491	11.6		27	6	▼2
Independents (IND)	170,249	10.8			3	▼10
Bharatiya Janata Party (BJP)	151,217	9.6		47	2	▲2
People's Democratic Front (PDF)	128,413	8.2		8	4	▲4
Hill State People's Democratic Party (HSPDP)	84,011	5.3		15	2	▲1
Nationalist Congress Party (NCP)	25,247	1.6		6	1	▼1
Garo National Council (GNC)	21,679	1.4		7	0	▼1
Khun Hynniewtrep National Awakening Movement (KHNAM)	14,164	0.9		6	1	▲1
All India Trinamool Congress (AITC)	5,544	0.4			0	Steady
None of the Above (NOTA)	14,631	0.9				
Vacant seat					1	▲1
Total		100.00		297	60	±0

=== Nagaland ===
Elections were held in Nagaland on 27 February 2018 in 59 out of 60 constituencies of the Legislative Assembly. The scheduled election in Northern Angami II constituency did not take place as only incumbent MLA Neiphiu Rio was nominated and was therefore declared elected unopposed. The ruling Naga People's Front was challenged by the newly established Nationalist Democratic Progressive Party (NDPP), an ally of the Bharatiya Janata Party. The NDPP and its allies won a majority, with former Chief Minister Neiphiu Rio returning to government.

Parties and coalitions	Popular vote			Seats		
Parties and coalitions	Votes	%	±pp	Candidates	Won	+/−
Nagaland People's Front (NPF)	389,912	38.8		58	26	▼12
Nationalist Democratic Progressive Party (NDPP)	253,090	25.2		40	18	▲18
Bharatiya Janata Party (BJP)	153,864	15.3		20	12	▲11
National People's Party (NPP)	69,506	6.9		25	2	▲2
Janata Dal (United) (JD(U))	45,089	4.5		13	1	Steady
Independents (IND)	43,008	4.3		11	1	▼7
Indian National Congress (INC)	20,752	2.1		18	0	▼8
Nationalist Congress Party (NCP)	10,693	1.1		6	0	▼4
Aam Aadmi Party (AAP)	7,491	0.7		3	0	Steady
Lok Janshakti Party (LJP)	2,765	0.3		2	0	Steady
None of the Above (NOTA)						
Total		100.00		196	60	±0

=== Karnataka ===
Elections were held in Karnataka on 12 May 2018 in 222 out of 224 constituencies of the Legislative Assembly. The incumbent Indian National Congress (INC) was seeking re-election, having governed the state since elections in 2013. The opposition Bharatiya Janata Party (BJP) and Janata Dal (Secular) (JD(S)) sought to regain office. The election led to a hung assembly, with the Bharatiya Janata Party emerging as the single largest party, with 104 seats, but failing to win a majority of seats and popular votes. The Indian National Congress (INC) won the popular vote. Following the election, B. S. Yeddyurappa was appointed Chief Minister and tasked with forming a minority BJP government, but resigned two days later on being unable to prove majority in the assembly. Thereafter the INC and JD(S) which had entered into a post-poll agreement formed a majority coalition government. H.D. Kumaraswamy of Janata Dal (Secular) was subsequently appointed Chief Minister.

Parties and coalitions	Popular vote			Seats	
Parties and coalitions	Votes	%	±pp	Won	+/−
Bharatiya Janata Party (BJP)	1,31,85,384	36.2	▲16.3	104	▲64
Indian National Congress (INC)	1,39,32,069	38.0	▲1.4	80	▼44
Janata Dal (Secular) (JDS)	66,66,307	18.3	▼1.9	37	▼3
Independents (IND)	14,37,045	3.9	▼3.5	1	▼8
Bahujan Samaj Party (BSP)	1,08,592	0.3		1	▲1
Karnataka Pragnyavantha Janatha Party (KPJP)	74,229	0.2		1	▲1
Other parties and candidates	6,83,632	2.2		0	▼13
None of the Above (NOTA)	3,22,841	0.9			
Total		100.00		224	±0

=== Madhya Pradesh ===
Parties and coalitions	Popular vote			Seats	
Parties and coalitions	Votes	%	±pp	Won	+/−
INC +	15,595,153	40.9%	▲4.59%	114	▲56
BJP	15,642,980	41%	▼3.88%	109	▼56
BSP	1,911,642	5%	▼1.29%	2	▼2
SP	496,025	1.3%	▲0.1%	1	▲1
Independents	2,218,230	5.8%	▲0.42%	4	▲1
None of the Above	542,295	1.4%			
Total		100.00		230	±0

=== Chhatishgarh ===
Parties and coalitions	Popular vote			Seats	
Parties and coalitions	Votes	%	±pp	Won	+/−
Indian National Congress (INC)	61,36,429	43.0%	▲2.71%	68	▲29
Bharatiya Janata Party (BJP)	47,01,530	33.0%	▼8.04%	15	▼34
Janta Congress Chhattisgarh (JCC)	10,81,760	7.6%	▲7.6%	5	▲5
Bahujan Samaj Party (BSP)	5,51,687	3.9%	▼0.37%	2	▲1
None of the Above (NOTA)	2,82,588	2.0%			
Total				90	±0

=== Mizoram ===
Parties and coalitions	Popular vote			Seats	
Parties and coalitions	Votes	%	±pp	Won	+/−
Mizo National Front	237,305	37.6%	▲8.9pp	26	▲21
Indian National Congress	190,412	30.1%	▼14.5pp	5	▼29
Zoram People's Movement	144,925	22.9%	▼1.5pp	8	▲5
Bharatiya Janata Party	50,744	8%	▲7.6pp	1	▲1
Others	8,211	1.3%	▼0.7pp	0	0
Total	631,597	100.00		40	±0

=== Rajasthan ===
The seat and vote share was as follows:

Parties and coalitions	Popular vote			Seats	
Parties and coalitions	Votes	%	±pp	Won	+/−
Indian National Congress	1,39,35,201	39.3%	▲6.23	100	▲79
Bharatiya Janata Party	1,37,57,502	38.8%	▼6.37	73	▼92
Bahujan Samaj Party	14,10,995	4.0%	▲0.63	6	▲3
Independents	33,72,206	9.5%	▲1.29	13	▲6
Rashtriya Loktantrik Party	8,56,038	2.4%	New	3	New
Communist Party of India (Marxist)	4,34,210	1.2%	▲0.33	2	▲2
Bharatiya Tribal Party	2,55,100	0.7%	New	2	New
Rashtriya Lok Dal	1,16,320	0.3%	▲0.29	1	▲1
Other parties and candidates (OTH)	8,87,317	2.5%	▲0.00	0	▲0
None of the Above	4,67,781	1.3%			
Total	3,54,92,670	100.00		199	±0

=== Telangana ===
Parties and coalitions	2018 votes & seats			
Parties and coalitions	Votes	%	Won	+/-
Telangana Rashtra Samithi (TRS)	9,700,749	46.9%	88	▲25
Indian National Congress (INC)	5,883,111	28.4%	19	▼2
All India Majlis-e-Ittehadul Muslimeen (AIMIM)	561,089	2.7%	7	Steady
Telugu Desam Party (TDP)	725,845	3.5%	2	▼13
Bharatiya Janata Party (BJP)	1,450,456	7.1%	1	▼4
All India Forward Bloc (AIFB)	159,141	1.8%	1	▲1
Bahujan Samaj Party (BSP)	428,430	2.1%	0	▼2
Communist Party of India (Marxist) (CPM)	91,099	0.4%	0	▼1
Communist Party of India (CPI)	83,215	0.4%	0	▼1
Independents (IND)	673,694	3.3%	1	Steady
None of the above (India) (NOTA)	224,709	1.1%		
Total			119	

== Assembly by-elections ==
=== Bihar ===
S.no	Date	Constituency	MLA before election	Party before election	Elected MLA	Party after election
1	11 March 2018	Bhabua	Anand Bhushan Pandey	Bharatiya Janata Party	Rinki Rani Pandey	Bharatiya Janata Party
2	11 March 2018	Jehanabad	Mudrika Singh Yadav	Rashtriya Janata Dal	Suday Yadav	Rashtriya Janata Dal
3	28 May 2018	Jokihat	Sarfaraz Alam	Janata Dal (United)	Shahnawaz Alam	Rashtriya Janata Dal

=== Gujarat ===
S.no	Date	Constituency	MLA before election	Party before election	Elected MLA	Party after election
1	20 December 2018	Jasdan	Kunwarjibhai Bavaliya	Indian National Congress	Kunwarjibhai Bavaliya	Bharatiya Janata Party

=== Jharkhand ===
S.no	Date	Constituency	MLA before election	Party before election	Elected MLA	Party after election
1	28 May 2018	Gomia	Yogendra Prasad	Jharkhand Mukti Morcha	Babita Devi	Jharkhand Mukti Morcha
2	28 May 2018	Silli	Amit Kumar	Jharkhand Mukti Morcha	Seema Devi	Jharkhand Mukti Morcha
3	20 December 2018	Kolebira	Anosh Ekka	Jharkhand Party	Naman Bixal Kongari	Indian National Congress

=== Karnataka ===
S.no	Date	Constituency	MLA before election	Party before election	Elected MLA	Party after election
1	6 November 2018	Ramanagara	H. D. Kumaraswamy	Janata Dal (Secular)	Anitha Kumaraswamy	Janata Dal (Secular)
2	6 November 2018	Jamkhandi	Siddu Nyamagouda	Indian National Congress	Anand Nyamagouda	Indian National Congress

=== Kerala ===
S.no	Date	Constituency	MLA before election	Party before election	Elected MLA	Party after election
1	28 May 2018	Chengannur	K. K. Ramachandran Nair	Communist Party of India (Marxist)	Saji Cherian	Communist Party of India (Marxist)

=== Madhya Pradesh ===
S.no	Date	Constituency	MLA before election	Party before election	Elected MLA	Party after election
1	24 February 2018	Kolaras	Ram Singh Yadav	Indian National Congress	Mahendra Singh Yadav	Indian National Congress
2	24 February 2018	Mungaoli	Mahendra Singh Kalukheda	Indian National Congress	Brajendra Singh Yadav	Indian National Congress

=== Maharashtra ===
S.no	Date	Constituency	MLA before election	Party before election	Elected MLA	Party after election
1	28 May 2018	Palus-Kadegaon	Patangrao Kadam	Indian National Congress	Vishwajeet Kadam	Indian National Congress

=== Meghalaya ===
S.no	Date	Constituency	MLA before election	Party before election	Elected MLA	Party after election
1	23 August 2018	South Tura	Agatha Sangma	National People's Party	Conrad Sangma	National People's Party
2	23 August 2018	Ranikor	Martin Danggo	Indian National Congress	Piyus Marwein	United Democratic Party

=== Odisha ===
S.no	Date	Constituency	MLA before election	Party before election	Elected MLA	Party after election
1	24 February 2018	Bijepur	Subal Sahu	Indian National Congress	Rita Sahu	Biju Janata Dal

=== Punjab ===
S.no	Date	Constituency	MLA before election	Party before election	Elected MLA	Party after election
1	28 May 2018	Shahkot	Ajit Singh Kohar	Shiromani Akali Dal	Hardev Singh Ladi	Indian National Congress

=== Rajasthan ===
S.no	Date	Constituency	MLA before election	Party before election	Elected MLA	Party after election
1	29 January 2018	Mandalgarh	Kirti Kumari	Bharatiya Janata Party	Vivek Dhakar	Indian National Congress

=== Uttar Pradesh ===
S.no	Date	Constituency	MLA before election	Party before election	Elected MLA	Party after election
1	28 May 2018	Noorpur	Lokendra Singh	Bharatiya Janata Party	Naim Ul Hasan	Samajwadi Party

=== Uttarakhand ===
S.no	Date	Constituency	MLA before election	Party before election	Elected MLA	Party after election
1	28 May 2018	Tharali	Maganlal Shah	Bharatiya Janata Party	Munni Devi Shah	Bharatiya Janata Party

=== West Bengal ===
S.no	Date	Constituency	MLA before election	Party before election	Elected MLA	Party after election
1	29 January 2018	Noapara	Madhusudan Ghose	Indian National Congress	Sunil Singh	All India Trinamool Congress
2	28 May 2018	Maheshtala	Kasturi Das	All India Trinamool Congress	Dulal Chandra Das	All India Trinamool Congress

== Local body elections ==
=== Jammu and Kashmir ===
Panchayat elections and municipal elections were held in Jammu and Kashmir in 2018 from October 8 till December 11. The last time Panchayat elections were held in the state was in 2011 and the last time municipal elections were held was in 2005.

=== Uttarakhand ===
On 18 November, elections to the local bodies were held in Uttarakhand.

== Rural elections ==
=== Assam ===
- 2018 Assam Panchayat Election

=== West Bengal ===
- 2018 West Bengal local elections

== See also ==
- 2017 elections in India
- 2019 elections in India
