= Guna Lok Sabha constituency =

Lok Sabha Constituency in Madhya Pradesh, India

Coordinates: 24.65°N 77.32°E

Guna
- Lok Sabha constituency
- Interactive Map Outlining Guna Lok Sabha constituency

Constituency details
- Country: India
- Region: Central India
- State: Madhya Pradesh
- Assembly constituencies: Shivpuri; Pichhore; Kolaras; Bamori; Guna; Ashok Nagar; Chanderi; Mungaoli
- Established: 1952
- Total electors: 18,89,551
- Reservation: None

Member of Parliament
- 18th Lok Sabha
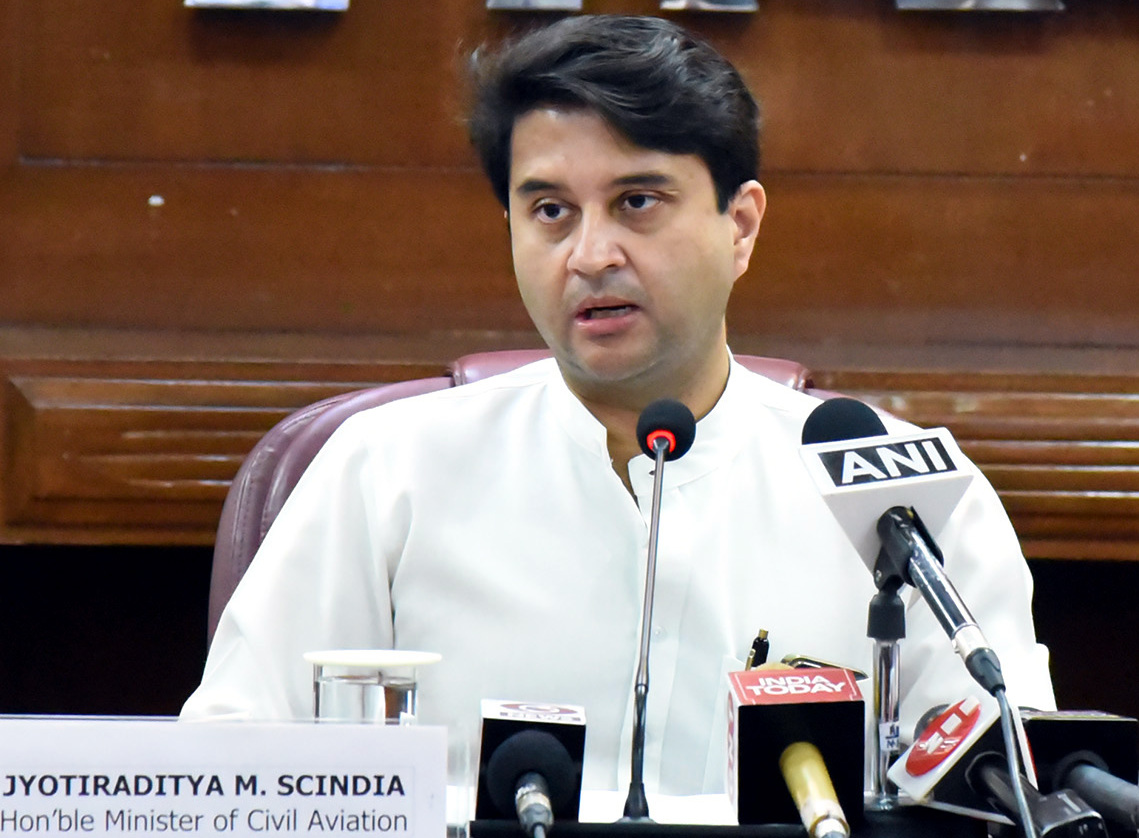
- Incumbent Jyotiraditya Madhavrao Scindia; Union Minister of Development of North Eastern Region; Union Minister of Communications
- Party: BJP
- Alliance: NDA
- Elected year: 2024
- Preceded by: Krishna Pal Singh Yadav

Guna is one of the 29 Lok Sabha constituencies in the Indian state of Madhya Pradesh. This constituency covers the entire Ashok Nagar district and parts of Shivpuri and Guna districts.

== Assembly segments ==
Presently, Guna Lok Sabha constituency comprises the following eight Legislative Assembly segments:

#	Name	District	Member	Party	2024 Lead
25	Shivpuri	Shivpuri	Devendra Kumar Jain	BJP	BJP
26	Pichhore	Shivpuri	Preetam Lodhi	BJP	BJP
27	Kolaras	Shivpuri	Mahendra Singh Yadav	BJP	BJP
28	Bamori	Guna	Rishi Agrawal	INC	BJP
29	Guna (SC)	Guna	Panna Lal Shakya	BJP	BJP
32	Ashok Nagar (SC)	Ashok Nagar	Haribaboo Rai	INC	BJP
33	Chanderi	Ashok Nagar	Jagganath Singh Raghuvansi	BJP	BJP
34	Mungaoli	Ashok Nagar	Brajendra Singh Yadav	BJP	BJP

== Members of Parliament ==
Year	Member	Party
1952	V. G. Deshpande	Akhil Bharatiya Hindu Mahasabha
1957	Vijaya Raje Scindia	Indian National Congress
1962	Ramsahai Pandey	Indian National Congress
1967	Vijaya Raje Scindia	Swatantra Party
1967^	J. B. Kripalani	Swatantra Party
1971	Madhavrao Scindia	Bharatiya Jana Sangh
1977	Madhavrao Scindia	Independent
1980	Madhavrao Scindia	Indian National Congress (I)
1984	Mahendra Singh	Indian National Congress
1989	Vijaya Raje Scindia	Bharatiya Janata Party
1991	Vijaya Raje Scindia	Bharatiya Janata Party
1996	Vijaya Raje Scindia	Bharatiya Janata Party
1998	Vijaya Raje Scindia	Bharatiya Janata Party
1999	Madhavrao Scindia	Indian National Congress
2002^	Jyotiraditya Scindia	Indian National Congress
2004	Jyotiraditya Scindia	Indian National Congress
2009	Jyotiraditya Scindia	Indian National Congress
2014	Jyotiraditya Scindia	Indian National Congress
2019	Krishna Pal Yadav	Bharatiya Janata Party
2024	Jyotiraditya Scindia	Bharatiya Janata Party

^ by poll

== Election results ==
=== 2024 Lok Sabha Election ===
2024 Indian general election: Guna
Party	Candidate	Votes	%	±%
BJP	Jyotiraditya Madhavrao Scindia	923,302	67.21	+15.1
INC	Rao Yadavendra Singh Yadav	3,82,373	27.83	−13.62
BSP	Dhaniram Chaudhary	30,235	2.2	−0.98
NOTA	None of the Above	9,089	0.66	−0.39
Majority		5,40,929	39.38	+28.72
Turnout		13,68,554 (Note: does not include postal ballots)	72.43	▲2.09
BJP hold		Swing	+2.09	

=== 2019 Lok Sabha Election ===
2019 Indian general elections: Guna
Party	Candidate	Votes	%	±%
BJP	Krishna Pal Singh Yadav	614,048	52.11	+11.54
INC	Jyotiraditya Madhavrao Scindia	4,88,500	41.45	−11.49
BSP	Lokendra Singh Rajpoot	37,530	3.18	+0.37
NOTA	None of the Above	12,403	1.05	−0.23
Majority		1,25,549	10.66	−1.71
Turnout		11,78,707	70.34	+9.51
BJP gain from INC		Swing	+11.52	

=== 2014 Lok Sabha election ===
2014 Indian general elections: Guna
Party	Candidate	Votes	%	±%
INC	Jyotiraditya Madhavrao Scindia	517,036	52.94	−10.65
BJP	Jaibhansingh Pawaiya	3,96,244	40.57	+15.41
BSP	Lakhan Singh Baghel	27,412	2.81	−1.68
NOTA	None of the Above	12,481	1.28	N/A
Majority		1,20,792	12.37	−26.06
Turnout		9,76,628	60.83	+6.8
INC hold		Swing	10.6+	

=== 2009 Lok Sabha Election ===
2009 Indian general elections: Guna
Party	Candidate	Votes	%	±%
INC	Jyotiraditya Madhavrao Scindia	413,297	63.59	
BJP	Narottam Mishra	1,63,560	25.16	
BSP	Lokpal Lodhi	29,164	4.49	
Majority		2,49,737	38.43	
Turnout		6,49,838	54.03	
INC hold		Swing		

=== 2004 Lok Sabha election ===
2004 Indian general election: Guna
Party	Candidate	Votes	%	±%
INC	Jyotiraditya Madhavrao Scindia	330,954	49.96	−15.38
BJP	Harivallabh Shukla	2,50,594	37.04	+0.74
BSP	Ramvilas Kirar	26,380	3.95	
SP	Usha Yadav	21,291	3.19	
Independent	Laxmansingh Dhakad Sujwayawale	12,554	1.88	
Independent	Rajeev Gupta	5,937	0.89	
RLD	Harbansingh Koli	5,795	0.87	
Independent	Jado Adiwasi	5,168	0.77	
Independent	Mahesh Kumar Budda	4,239	0.63	
Independent	Charandas Jatav	3,083	0.46	
Independent	Omprakash	2,398	0.36	
Majority		86,360	12.92	+8.64
Turnout		6,68,393	47.02	−6.79
INC hold		Swing	-15.38	

==== 2002 bye-poll ====
Bye-Election, 2002: Guna
Party	Candidate	Votes	%	±%
INC	Jyotiraditya Madhavrao Scindia	535,728	74.28	
BJP	Rao Deshraj Singh Yadav	1,29,160	17.91	
Independent	Sukhlal Kushwah	1,28,568	16.76	
RKP	Lakhan Singh Lodhi	5,218	0.72	
Majority		4,06,568	56.37	
Turnout		7,21,222	53.81	
INC hold		Swing		

=== 1999 Lok Sabha election ===
1999 Indian general election: Guna
Party	Candidate	Votes	%	±%
INC	Madhavrao Scindia	443,965		
BJP	Rao Deshraj Singh Yadav	2,29,537		
INC gain from BJP		Swing	+11.52	

=== 1998 Lok Sabha election ===
General Election, 1998: Guna
Party	Candidate	Votes	%	±%
BJP	Vijaya Raje Scindia	336,151		
INC	Devendra Singh	2,33,153		
BSP	Prakash Singh	1,17,154		
CPI	Prabhati Lal	18,318		
Majority		1,02,998		
Turnout		7,34,181		
BJP gain from		Swing	+11.52	

=== 1952 Lok Sabha election ===
- V. G. Deshpande (Hindu Mahasabha) : 56,518 votes
- Gopi Krishna Vijayvargiya (INC) : 53549

== See also ==
- Guna district
- List of constituencies of the Lok Sabha
