= Minister of Communications (India) =

Government ministry of India

- Sañcār Mantrī
- Emblem of the Ministry of Communications

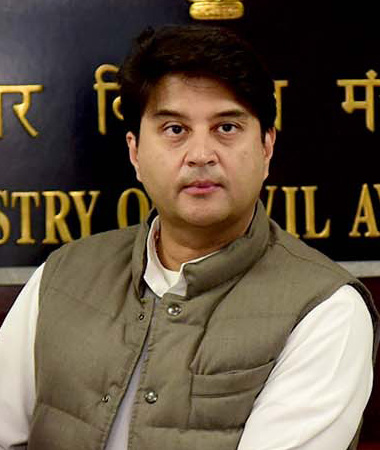
- Incumbent; Jyotiraditya Scindia since 10 June 2024
- Ministry of Communications
- Member of: Cabinet of India
- Reports to: Prime Minister of India; Parliament of India
- Appointer: President of India on the recommendation of the Prime Minister of India
- Formation: 1947 (as Ministry of Communications); 5 July 2016 (current form)
- First holder: Rafi Ahmed Kidwai

The minister of communications (Hindi: संचार मंत्री) is the head of the Ministry of Communications and a senior member of the union council of ministers of the Government of India. The portfolio is usually held by a minister with cabinet rank who is a senior member of the council of ministers and is often assisted by one or two junior ministers or the ministers of state.

The current minister is Jyotiraditya Scindia who has been serving in office since 10 June 2024 and is currently assisted by Dr. Chandra Sekhar Pemmasani as the minister of state for communications.

One former president - Shankar Dayal Sharma served as minister in the ministry. Sharma was Cabinet minister for communications from 1974 until 1977. Two former prime ministers, Lal Bahadur Shastri and Inder Kumar Gujral also served as ministers in the ministry. Shastri was Cabinet minister for transport and communications from 1957 until 1958, while Gujral was minister of state for communications from 1967 until 1971.

== History ==
The Ministry of Communications came into existence soon after India's independence in the First Nehru ministry formed on 15 August 1947. Rafi Ahmed Kidwai was appointed as the first minister of communications and served until 1951. The ministry was merged with the Ministry of Transport to form the "Ministry of Transport and Communications" on 17 April 1957 in the Third Nehru ministry. Lal Bahadur Shastri was appointed as the minister in the newly-formed ministry. The ministry was bifurcated on 31 August 1963 into the Ministry of Transport and the Department of Posts and Telegraphs. The "Department of Posts and Telegraphs" became the Ministry of Communications on 13 May 1964.

On 22 December 2001, the Ministry of Communications and the Ministry of Information Technology were merged to form the Ministry of Communications and Information Technology. The ministry was further bifurcated on 5 July 2016 into the Ministry of Communications and the Ministry of Electronics and Information Technology. The two ministries have since then existed independently.

== Agencies ==
- India Post Payments Bank

== Cabinet ministers ==
Portrait	Minister (Birth-Death) Constituency	Term of office			Political party	Ministry	Prime Minister
Portrait	Minister (Birth-Death) Constituency	From	To	Period	Political party	Ministry	Prime Minister
=== Minister of Communications (1947–1957) ===
	Rafi Ahmed Kidwai (1894–1954)	15 August 1947	2 August 1951	3 years, 352 days	Indian National Congress	Nehru I	Jawaharlal Nehru
	Amrit Kaur (1887–1964)	2 August 1951	13 May 1952	285 days	Indian National Congress	Nehru I	Jawaharlal Nehru
	Jagjivan Ram (1908–1986); MP for Shahabad South	13 May 1952	7 December 1956	4 years, 208 days	Indian National Congress	Nehru II	Jawaharlal Nehru
	Raj Bahadur (1912–1990); MP for Jaipur–Sawai Madhopur (Minister of State)	7 December 1956	17 April 1957	131 days	Indian National Congress	Nehru II	Jawaharlal Nehru
Ministry disestablished during this interval (Note: The ministry's competences were transferred to the Ministry of Transport and Communications.)
=== Minister of Posts and Telegraph (1963–1964) ===
	Ashoke Kumar Sen (1913–1996); MP for Calcutta North West	1 September 1963	13 May 1964	255 days	Indian National Congress	Nehru IV	Jawaharlal Nehru
=== Minister of Communications (1964–2001) ===
	Ashoke Kumar Sen (1913–1996); MP for Calcutta North West	13 May 1964	27 May 1964	31 days	Indian National Congress	Nehru IV	Jawaharlal Nehru
	Ashoke Kumar Sen (1913–1996); MP for Calcutta North West	27 May 1964	9 June 1964	31 days	Indian National Congress	Nanda I	Gulzarilal Nanda
	Ashoke Kumar Sen (1913–1996); MP for Calcutta North West	9 June 1964	13 June 1964	31 days	Indian National Congress	Shastri	Lal Bahadur Shastri
	Satya Narayan Sinha (1900–1983); MP for Samastipur	13 June 1964	11 January 1966	2 years, 273 days	Indian National Congress	Shastri	Lal Bahadur Shastri
	Satya Narayan Sinha (1900–1983); MP for Samastipur	11 January 1966	24 January 1966	2 years, 273 days	Indian National Congress	Nanda II	Gulzarilal Nanda
	Satya Narayan Sinha (1900–1983); MP for Samastipur	24 January 1966	13 March 1967	2 years, 273 days	Indian National Congress	Indira I	Indira Gandhi
	Ram Subhag Singh (1917–1980); MP for Buxar	13 March 1967	14 February 1969	1 year, 338 days	Indian National Congress	Indira II	Indira Gandhi
	Satya Narayan Sinha (1900–1983); MP for Darbhanga	14 February 1969	8 March 1971	2 years, 22 days	Indian National Congress (R)	Indira II	Indira Gandhi
	Indira Gandhi (1917–1984); MP for Raebareli (Prime Minister)	8 March 1971	18 March 1971	10 days	Indian National Congress (R)	Indira II	Indira Gandhi
	Sher Singh Kadyan (1917–2009); MP for Rohtak (Minister of State)	18 March 1971	2 May 1971	45 days	Indian National Congress (R)	Indira III	Indira Gandhi
	Hemwati Nandan Bahuguna (1919–1989); MP for Allahabad (Minister of State)	2 May 1971	8 November 1973	2 years, 190 days	Indian National Congress (R)	Indira III	Indira Gandhi
	Raj Bahadur (1912–1990); MP for Bharatpur	8 November 1973	11 January 1974	64 days	Indian National Congress (R)	Indira III	Indira Gandhi
	Kasu Brahmananda Reddy (1909–1994); Rajya Sabha MP for Andhra Pradesh	11 January 1974	10 October 1974	272 days	Indian National Congress (R)	Indira III	Indira Gandhi
	Shankar Dayal Sharma (1918–1999); MP for Bhopal	10 October 1974	24 March 1977	2 years, 165 days	Indian National Congress (R)	Indira III	Indira Gandhi
	Morarji Desai (1896–1995); MP for Surat (Prime Minister)	24 March 1977	26 March 1977	2 days	Janata Party	Desai	Morarji Desai
	Parkash Singh Badal (1927–2023); MP for Faridkot	26 March 1977	27 March 1977	1 day	Shiromani Akali Dal	Desai	Morarji Desai
	George Fernandes (1930–2019); MP for Muzaffarpur	27 March 1977	6 July 1977	101 days	Janata Party	Desai	Morarji Desai
	Brij Lal Varma (1916–1987); MP for Mahasamund	6 July 1977	28 July 1979	2 years, 22 days	Janata Party	Desai	Morarji Desai
	Charan Singh (1902–1987); MP for Baghpat (Prime Minister)	28 July 1979	30 July 1979	2 days	Janata Party (Secular)	Charan	Charan Singh
	Zulfiquarullah; MP for Sultanpur (Minister of State)	30 July 1979	27 November 1979	120 days	Janata Party (Secular)	Charan	Charan Singh
	Charan Singh (1902–1987); MP for Baghpat (Prime Minister)	27 November 1979	7 December 1979	10 days	Janata Party (Secular)	Charan	Charan Singh
	Shyam Nandan Prasad Mishra (1920–2004); MP for Begusarai	7 December 1979	14 January 1980	38 days	Janata Party (Secular)	Charan	Charan Singh
	Indira Gandhi (1917–1984); MP for Medak (Prime Minister)	14 January 1980	16 January 1980	2 days	Indian National Congress (I)	Indira IV	Indira Gandhi
	Bhishma Narain Singh (1933–2018); Rajya Sabha MP for Bihar	16 January 1980	3 March 1980	47 days	Indian National Congress (I)	Indira IV	Indira Gandhi
	C. M. Stephen (1918–1984); MP for Gulbarga	3 March 1980	2 September 1982	2 years, 183 days	Indian National Congress (I)	Indira IV	Indira Gandhi
	Anant Sharma (1919–1988); Rajya Sabha MP for Bihar	2 September 1982	14 February 1983	165 days	Indian National Congress (I)	Indira IV	Indira Gandhi
	Indira Gandhi (1917–1984); MP for Medak (Prime Minister)	14 February 1983	31 October 1984 (died in office)	1 year, 260 days	Indian National Congress (I)	Indira IV	Indira Gandhi
	Rajiv Gandhi (1944–1991); MP for Amethi (Prime Minister)	31 October 1984	4 November 1984	4 days	Indian National Congress (I)	Rajiv I	Rajiv Gandhi
	Ram Niwas Mirdha (1924–2010); MP for Barmer	31 December 1984	22 October 1986	1 year, 295 days	Indian National Congress (I)	Rajiv II	Rajiv Gandhi
	Arjun Singh (1930–2011); MP for South Delhi	22 October 1986	14 February 1988	1 year, 115 days	Indian National Congress (I)	Rajiv II	Rajiv Gandhi
	Vasant Sathe (1925–2011); MP for Wardha	14 February 1988	25 June 1988	132 days	Indian National Congress (I)	Rajiv II	Rajiv Gandhi
	Bir Bahadur Singh (1935–1989); Rajya Sabha MP for Uttar Pradesh	25 June 1988	30 May 1989 (died in office)	339 days	Indian National Congress (I)	Rajiv II	Rajiv Gandhi
	Rajiv Gandhi (1944–1991); MP for Amethi (Prime Minister)	31 May 1989	4 July 1989	34 days	Indian National Congress (I)	Rajiv II	Rajiv Gandhi
	Giridhar Gamang (born 1943); MP for Koraput (Minister of State, I/C)	4 July 1989	2 December 1989	151 days	Indian National Congress (I)	Rajiv II	Rajiv Gandhi
	Vishwanath Pratap Singh (1931–2008); MP for Fatehpur (Prime Minister)	2 December 1989	6 December 1989	4 days	Janata Dal	Vishwanath	Vishwanath Pratap Singh
	K. P. Unnikrishnan (born 1936); MP for Vatakara	6 December 1989	23 April 1990	138 days	Janata Dal	Vishwanath	Vishwanath Pratap Singh
	Janeshwar Mishra (1933–2010); MP for Allahabad (Minister of State, I/C)	23 April 1990	5 November 1990	196 days	Janata Dal	Vishwanath	Vishwanath Pratap Singh
	Vishwanath Pratap Singh (1931–2008); MP for Fatehpur (Prime Minister)	6 November 1990	10 November 1990	4 days	Janata Dal	Vishwanath	Vishwanath Pratap Singh
	Chandra Shekhar (1927–2007); MP for Ballia (Prime Minister)	10 November 1990	21 November 1990	11 days	Samajwadi Janata Party (Rashtriya)	Chandra Shekhar	Chandra Shekhar
	Sanjaya Sinh (born 1951); Rajya Sabha MP for Uttar Pradesh (Minister of State, I/C)	21 November 1990	21 June 1991	212 days	Samajwadi Janata Party (Rashtriya)	Chandra Shekhar	Chandra Shekhar
	Rajesh Pilot (1945–2000); MP for Dausa (Minister of State, I/C)	21 June 1991	18 January 1993	1 year, 211 days	Indian National Congress (I)	Rao	P. V. Narasimha Rao
	Sukh Ram (1927–2022); MP for Mandi (Minister of State, I/C)	18 January 1993	16 May 1996	3 years, 119 days	Indian National Congress (I)	Rao	P. V. Narasimha Rao
	Atal Bihari Vajpayee (1924–2018); MP for Lucknow (Prime Minister)	16 May 1996	1 June 1996	16 days	Bharatiya Janata Party	Vajpayee I	Atal Bihari Vajpayee
	H. D. Deve Gowda (born 1933); Unelected (Prime Minister)	1 June 1996	29 June 1996	28 days	Janata Dal	Deve Gowda	H. D. Deve Gowda
	Beni Prasad Verma (1941–2020); MP for Kaiserganj (Minister of State, I/C until 10 July 1996)	29 June 1996	21 April 1997	1 year, 263 days	Samajwadi Party	Deve Gowda	H. D. Deve Gowda
	Beni Prasad Verma (1941–2020); MP for Kaiserganj (Minister of State, I/C until 10 July 1996)	21 April 1997	19 March 1998	1 year, 263 days	Samajwadi Party	Gujral	Inder Kumar Gujral
	Buta Singh (1934–2021); MP for Jalore	19 March 1998	20 April 1998	32 days	Independent	Vajpayee II	Atal Bihari Vajpayee
	Sushma Swaraj (1952–2019); MP for South Delhi	20 April 1998	11 October 1998	174 days	Bharatiya Janata Party	Vajpayee II	Atal Bihari Vajpayee
	Atal Bihari Vajpayee (1924–2018); MP for Lucknow (Prime Minister)	11 October 1998	5 December 1998	55 days	Bharatiya Janata Party	Vajpayee II	Atal Bihari Vajpayee
	Jagmohan (1927–2021); MP for New Delhi	5 December 1998	8 June 1999	185 days	Bharatiya Janata Party	Vajpayee II	Atal Bihari Vajpayee
	Atal Bihari Vajpayee (1924–2018); MP for Lucknow (Prime Minister)	8 June 1999	13 October 1999	127 days	Bharatiya Janata Party	Vajpayee II	Atal Bihari Vajpayee
	Ram Vilas Paswan (1946–2020); MP for Hajipur	13 October 1999	1 September 2001	1 year, 323 days	Janata Dal (United)	Vajpayee III	Atal Bihari Vajpayee
	Ram Vilas Paswan (1946–2020); MP for Hajipur	13 October 1999	1 September 2001	1 year, 323 days	Lok Janshakti Party	Vajpayee III	Atal Bihari Vajpayee
	Pramod Mahajan (1949–2006); Rajya Sabha MP for Maharashtra	1 September 2001	22 December 2001	112 days	Bharatiya Janata Party	Vajpayee III	Atal Bihari Vajpayee
=== Minister of Communications and Information Technology (2001–2016) ===
	Pramod Mahajan (1949–2006); Rajya Sabha MP for Maharashtra	22 December 2001	29 January 2003	1 year, 38 days	Bharatiya Janata Party	Vajpayee III	Atal Bihari Vajpayee
	Arun Shourie (born 1941); Rajya Sabha MP for Uttar Pradesh	29 January 2003	22 May 2004	1 year, 114 days	Bharatiya Janata Party	Vajpayee III	Atal Bihari Vajpayee
	Dayanidhi Maran (born 1966); MP for Chennai Central	23 May 2004	15 May 2007	2 years, 357 days	Dravida Munnetra Kazhagam	Manmohan I	Manmohan Singh
	A. Raja (born 1963); MP for Perambalur	15 May 2007	22 May 2009	2 years, 7 days	Dravida Munnetra Kazhagam	Manmohan I	Manmohan Singh
	Manmohan Singh (1932–2024); Rajya Sabha MP for Assam (Prime Minister)	22 May 2009	28 May 2009	6 days	Indian National Congress	Manmohan II	Manmohan Singh
	A. Raja (born 1963); MP for Nilgiris	28 May 2009	15 November 2010	1 year, 171 days	Dravida Munnetra Kazhagam	Manmohan II	Manmohan Singh
	Kapil Sibal (born 1948); MP for Chandni Chowk	15 November 2010	26 May 2014	3 years, 192 days	Indian National Congress	Manmohan II	Manmohan Singh
	Ravi Shankar Prasad (born 1954); Rajya Sabha MP for Bihar	27 May 2014	5 July 2016	2 years, 39 days	Bharatiya Janata Party	Modi I	Narendra Modi
=== Minister of Communications (2016–present) ===
	Manoj Sinha (born 1959); MP for Ghazipur (Minister of State, I/C)	5 July 2016	30 May 2019	2 years, 329 days	Bharatiya Janata Party	Modi I	Narendra Modi
	Ravi Shankar Prasad (born 1954); MP for Patna Sahib	31 May 2019	7 July 2021	2 years, 37 days	Bharatiya Janata Party	Modi II	Narendra Modi
	Ashwini Vaishnaw (born 1970); Rajya Sabha MP for Odisha	7 July 2021	9 June 2024	2 years, 338 days	Bharatiya Janata Party	Modi II	Narendra Modi
	Jyotiraditya Scindia (born 1971); MP for Guna	9 June 2024	Incumbent	2 years, 87 days	Bharatiya Janata Party	Modi III	Narendra Modi

== Ministers of state ==
Portrait	Minister (Birth-Death) Constituency	Term of office			Political party	Ministry	Prime Minister
Portrait	Minister (Birth-Death) Constituency	From	To	Period	Political party	Ministry	Prime Minister
Minister of State of Communications
	Raj Bahadur (1912–1990); MP for Jaipur–Sawai Madhopur	14 February 1956	7 December 1956	297 days	Indian National Congress	Nehru II	Jawaharlal Nehru
Ministry disestablished during this interval
Minister of State of Communications
	Jagannath Rao (1909–?); MP for Chatrapur	14 February 1966	13 March 1967	1 year, 27 days	Indian National Congress	Indira I	Indira Gandhi
	Inder Kumar Gujral (1919–2012); Rajya Sabha MP for Punjab	18 March 1967	18 March 1971	4 years, 0 days	Indian National Congress	Indira II	Indira Gandhi
	Inder Kumar Gujral (1919–2012); Rajya Sabha MP for Punjab	18 March 1967	18 March 1971	4 years, 0 days	Indian National Congress (R)	Indira II	Indira Gandhi
	Sher Singh Kadyan (1917–2009); MP for Rohtak	14 February 1969	18 March 1971	2 years, 32 days	Indian National Congress (R)	Indira II	Indira Gandhi
	Sher Singh Kadyan (1917–2009); MP for Rohtak	12 January 1974	10 October 1974	271 days	Indian National Congress (R)	Indira III	Indira Gandhi
	Narhari Prasad Sai (1929–1999); MP for Raigarh	14 August 1977	28 July 1979	1 year, 348 days	Janata Party	Desai	Morarji Desai
	Narsingh Yadav; MP for Chandauli	30 July 1979	14 January 1980	168 days	Janata Party (Secular)	Charan	Charan Singh
	Tukaram Shrangare (1937–2011); MP for Osmanabad	31 July 1979	14 January 1980	167 days	Janata Party (Secular)	Charan	Charan Singh
	Kartik Oraon (1924–1981); MP for Lohardaga	8 June 1980	8 December 1981 (died in office)	1 year, 183 days	Indian National Congress (I)	Indira IV	Indira Gandhi
	Yogendra Makwana (born 1933); Rajya Sabha MP for Gujarat	15 January 1982	29 January 1983	1 year, 14 days	Indian National Congress (I)	Indira IV	Indira Gandhi
	Vitthalrao Gadgil (1928–2001); MP for Pune	29 January 1983	31 October 1984	1 year, 332 days	Indian National Congress (I)	Indira IV	Indira Gandhi
	Vitthalrao Gadgil (1928–2001); MP for Pune	4 November 1984	31 December 1984	1 year, 332 days	Indian National Congress (I)	Rajiv I	Rajiv Gandhi
	Giridhar Gamang (born 1943); MP for Koraput	25 June 1988	4 July 1989	1 year, 9 days	Indian National Congress (I)	Rajiv II	Rajiv Gandhi
	Beni Prasad Verma (1941–2020); MP for Kaiserganj	1 June 1996	29 June 1996	28 days	Samajwadi Party	Deve Gowda	H. D. Deve Gowda
	Kabindra Purkayastha (1931–2026); MP for Silchar	20 March 1998	13 October 1999	1 year, 207 days	Bharatiya Janata Party	Vajpayee II	Atal Bihari Vajpayee
	Tapan Sikdar (1944–2014); MP for Dum Dum	13 October 1999	22 December 2001	2 years, 70 days	Bharatiya Janata Party	Vajpayee III	Atal Bihari Vajpayee
Minister of State of Communications and Information Technology
	Tapan Sikdar (1944–2014); MP for Dum Dum	22 December 2001	1 July 2002	191 days	Bharatiya Janata Party	Vajpayee III	Atal Bihari Vajpayee
	Sumitra Mahajan (born 1943); MP for Indore	1 July 2002	24 May 2003	327 days	Bharatiya Janata Party	Vajpayee III	Atal Bihari Vajpayee
	Sanjay Paswan (born 1962); MP for Nawada	1 July 2002	29 January 2003	212 days	Bharatiya Janata Party	Vajpayee III	Atal Bihari Vajpayee
	Su. Thirunavukkarasar (born 1949); MP for Pudukkottai	29 January 2003	22 May 2004	1 year, 114 days	Bharatiya Janata Party	Vajpayee III	Atal Bihari Vajpayee
	Ashok Kumar Pradhan (born 1953); MP for Khurja	24 May 2003	22 May 2004	364 days	Bharatiya Janata Party	Vajpayee III	Atal Bihari Vajpayee
	Shakeel Ahmad (born 1956); MP for Madhubani	23 May 2004	6 April 2008	3 years, 319 days	Indian National Congress	Manmohan I	Manmohan Singh
	Jyotiraditya Scindia (born 1971); MP for Guna	6 April 2008	22 May 2009	1 year, 46 days	Indian National Congress	Manmohan I	Manmohan Singh
	Gurudas Kamat (1954–2018); MP for Mumbai North West	28 May 2009	19 January 2011	1 year, 236 days	Indian National Congress	Manmohan II	Manmohan Singh
	Sachin Pilot (born 1977); MP for Dausa	28 May 2009	28 October 2012	3 years, 153 days	Indian National Congress	Manmohan II	Manmohan Singh
	Gurudas Kamat (1954–2018); MP for Mumbai North West	21 January 2011	12 July 2011	172 days	Indian National Congress	Manmohan II	Manmohan Singh
	Milind Deora (born 1976); MP for Mumbai South	12 July 2011	26 May 2014	2 years, 318 days	Indian National Congress	Manmohan II	Manmohan Singh
	Killi Krupa Rani (born 1965); MP for Srikakulam	28 October 2012	26 May 2014	1 year, 210 days	Indian National Congress	Manmohan II	Manmohan Singh
Minister of State of Communications
	Sanjay Shamrao Dhotre (born 1959); MP for Akola	31 May 2019	7 July 2021	2 years, 37 days	Bharatiya Janata Party	Modi II	Narendra Modi
	Devusinh Jesingbhai Chauhan (born 1964); MP for Kheda	7 July 2021	9 June 2024	2 years, 338 days	Bharatiya Janata Party	Modi II	Narendra Modi
	Chandra Sekhar Pemmasani (born 1976); MP for Guntur	10 June 2024	Incumbent	2 years, 89 days	Telugu Desam Party	Modi III	Narendra Modi

== Deputy ministers ==
Portrait	Minister (Birth-Death) Constituency	Term of office			Political party	Ministry	Prime Minister
Portrait	Minister (Birth-Death) Constituency	From	To	Period	Political party	Ministry	Prime Minister
Deputy Minister of Communications
	Khurshed Lal (1903–1951); MCA for United Provinces	1 October 1948	29 January 1951	2 years, 120 days	Indian National Congress	Nehru I	Jawaharlal Nehru
	Raj Bahadur (1912–1990); MCA for Rajputana; MP for Jaipur–Sawai Madhopur	29 January 1951	13 May 1952	1 year, 105 days	Indian National Congress	Nehru I	Jawaharlal Nehru
	Raj Bahadur (1912–1990); MCA for Rajputana; MP for Jaipur–Sawai Madhopur	4 June 1952	14 February 1956	3 years, 255 days	Indian National Congress	Nehru II	Jawaharlal Nehru
Deputy Minister of Posts and Telegraphs
	Bijoy Chandra Bhagavati (1905–1997); MP for Tezpur	1 September 1963	13 May 1964	255 days	Indian National Congress	Nehru IV	Jawaharlal Nehru
Deputy Minister of Communications
	Bijoy Chandra Bhagavati (1905–1997); MP for Tezpur	13 May 1964	27 May 1964	1 year, 250 days	Indian National Congress	Nehru IV	Jawaharlal Nehru
	Bijoy Chandra Bhagavati (1905–1997); MP for Tezpur	27 May 1964	9 June 1964	1 year, 250 days	Indian National Congress	Nanda I	Gulzarilal Nanda
	Bijoy Chandra Bhagavati (1905–1997); MP for Tezpur	15 June 1964	11 January 1966	1 year, 250 days	Indian National Congress	Shastri	Lal Bahadur Shastri
	Bijoy Chandra Bhagavati (1905–1997); MP for Tezpur	11 January 1966	24 January 1966	1 year, 250 days	Indian National Congress	Nanda II	Gulzarilal Nanda
	Vidya Charan Shukla (1929–2013); MP for Mahasamund	24 January 1966	14 February 1966	21 days	Indian National Congress	Indira I	Indira Gandhi
	Jagannath Pahadia (1932–1991); MP for Bayana	22 July 1972	23 December 1976	4 years, 154 days	Indian National Congress (R)	Indira III	Indira Gandhi
	Balgovind Verma (1923–1980); MP for Kheri	23 December 1976	24 March 1977	91 days	Indian National Congress (R)	Indira III	Indira Gandhi
	Vijaykumar Naval Patil (born 1942); MP for Dhule	19 October 1980	31 October 1984	4 years, 68 days	Indian National Congress (I)	Indira IV	Indira Gandhi
	Vijaykumar Naval Patil (born 1942); MP for Dhule	4 November 1984	31 December 1984	4 years, 68 days	Indian National Congress (I)	Rajiv I	Rajiv Gandhi
	Jai Parkash (born 1954); MP for Hisar	7 December 1990	21 June 1991	196 days	Samajwadi Janata Party (Rashtriya)	Chandra Shekhar	Chandra Shekhar
	P. V. Rangayya Naidu (born 1933); MP for Khammam	21 June 1991	18 January 1993	1 year, 211 days	Indian National Congress (I)	Rao	P. V. Narasimha Rao
