= Kolaras Assembly constituency =

Assembly constituency in Madhya Pradesh

Coordinates: 25.22°N 77.61°E

Kolaras
- Constituency No. 27 for the Madhya Pradesh Legislative Assembly

Constituency details
- Country: India
- Region: Central India
- State: Madhya Pradesh
- District: Shivpuri
- Lok Sabha constituency: Guna
- Established: 1951
- Reservation: None

Member of Legislative Assembly
- 16th Madhya Pradesh Legislative Assembly
- Incumbent Mahendra Singh Yadav
- Party: Bharatiya Janata Party
- Elected year: 2023
- Preceded by: Virendra Raghuwanshi

Kolaras Assembly constituency is one of the 230 Vidhan Sabha (Legislative Assembly) constituencies of Madhya Pradesh state in central India. This constituency came into existence in 1951, as Shivpuri Kolaras, one of the 79 Vidhan Sabha constituencies of the erstwhile Madhya Bharat state. This constituency was reserved for the candidates belonging to the Scheduled castes from 1976 to 2008.

== Overview ==
Kolaras (constituency number 27) is one of the 5 Vidhan Sabha constituencies located in Shivpuri district. This constituency covers the entire Kolaras tehsil of the district.

Kolaras is part of Guna Lok Sabha constituency along with seven other Vidhan Sabha segments, namely, Pichhore and Shivpuri in this district, Bamori and Guna in Guna district and Ashok Nagar, Chanderi and Mungaoli in Ashoknagar district.

== Members of Legislative Assembly ==
=== Shivpuri Kolaras constituency of Madhya Bharat ===
Year	Member	Party
1952	Tula Ram	Indian National Congress
1952	Narhari Prasad	Indian National Congress

=== As a constituency of Madhya Pradesh ===
Year	Member	Party
1957	Vedehi Charan	Indian National Congress
1962	Manorama	Indian National Congress
1967	Jagadish Prasad Verma	Swatantra Party
1972	Jagadish Prasad Verma	Bharatiya Jana Sangh
1977	Kamta Prasad	Janata Party
1980	Pooran Singh Bedia	Indian National Congress (Indira)
1985	Pooran Singh Bedia	Indian National Congress
1990	Om Prakash Khatik	Bharatiya Janata Party
1993	Om Prakash Khatik	Bharatiya Janata Party
1998	Pooran Singh Bedia	Indian National Congress
2003	Om Prakash Khatik	Bharatiya Janata Party
2008	Devendra Kumar Jain	Bharatiya Janata Party
2013	Ram Singh Yadav	Indian National Congress
2018^	Mahendra Singh Yadav	Bharatiya Janata Party
2018	Virendra Raghuwanshi	Bharatiya Janata Party
2023	Mahendra Singh Yadav	Bharatiya Janata Party

== Election results ==
=== 2023 ===
2023 Madhya Pradesh Legislative Assembly election: Kolaras
Party	Candidate	Votes	%	±%
BJP	Mahendra Singh Yadav	108,685	54.32	+12.21
INC	Baijnath Singh Yadav	57,712	28.85	−12.84
BSP	Naval Dhakad	24,886	12.44	+2.86
NOTA	None of the above	1,805	0.9	−0.07
Majority		50,973	25.47	+25.05
Turnout		200,069	79.15	+3.17
BJP hold		Swing		

=== 2018 ===
2018 Madhya Pradesh Legislative Assembly election: Kolaras
Party	Candidate	Votes	%	±%
BJP	Virendra Raghuwanshi	72,450	42.11	
INC	Mahendra Singh Yadav	71,730	41.69	
BSP	Ashok Sharma	16,483	9.58	
Bahujan Sangharsh Dal	Dhani Ram	2,018	1.17	
Independent	Mahendra Singh Yadav	1,688	0.98	
Independent	Mangal Singh	1,577	0.92	
NOTA	None of the above	1,674	0.97	
Majority		720	0.42	
Turnout		172,045	75.98	
BJP hold		Swing		

== See also ==
- Kolaras
