= Mandalgarh Assembly constituency =

Legislative Assembly constituency in Rajasthan State, India

Coordinates: 25.2°N 75.09°E

Mandalgarh
- Constituency No. 183 for the Rajasthan Legislative Assembly

Constituency details
- Country: India
- Region: North India
- State: Rajasthan
- District: Bhilwara
- Lok Sabha constituency: Bhilwara
- Established: 1972
- Total electors: 248,734
- Reservation: None

Member of Legislative Assembly
- 16th Rajasthan Legislative Assembly
- Incumbent Gopal Lal Sharma
- Party: Bharatiya Janata Party

Mandalgarh Assembly constituency is one of the 200 Legislative Assembly constituencies of Rajasthan state in India.

It is part of Bhilwara district.

== Members of the Legislative Assembly ==
Year	Member	Party
2013	Kirti Kumari	Bharatiya Janata Party
2018 By	Vivek Dhakar	Indian National Congress
2018	Gopal Lal Sharma	Bharatiya Janata Party
2023	Gopal Lal Sharma	Bharatiya Janata Party

== Election results ==
=== 2023 ===
2023 Rajasthan Legislative Assembly election: Mandalgarh
Party	Candidate	Votes	%	±%
BJP	Gopal Lal Sharma	93,119	46.67	+9.64
INC	Vivek Dhakar	84,925	42.56	+11.12
RLP	Bheru Lal Gurjar	10,514	5.27	
BAP	Bhawana Gurjar	2,281	1.14	
NOTA	None of the above	3,000	1.5	−0.37
Majority		8,194	4.11	−1.48
Turnout		199,529	80.22	+0.98
BJP hold		Swing		

=== 2018 ===
Rajasthan Legislative Assembly Election, 2018: Mandalgarh
Party	Candidate	Votes	%	±%
BJP	Gopal Lal Sharma	68,481	37.03	
INC	Vivek Dhakar	58,148	31.44	
Independent	Gopal Malviya	42,163	22.8	
BSP	Pyaralal Regar	2,062	1.11	
NOTA	None of the above	3,459	1.87	
Majority		10,333	5.59	
Turnout		184,934	79.24	
BJP gain from INC		Swing		

=== 2018 bypoll ===
Rajasthan Legislative Assembly By Election, 2018: Mandalgarh
Party	Candidate	Votes	%	±%
INC	Vivek Dhakar	70,146		
BJP	Shakti Singh Hada	57170		
Independent	Gopal Malviya	40470	22.2	
NOTA	None of the Above			
Majority				
Turnout				
Registered electors				
INC gain from BJP				

=== 2013 ===
Rajasthan Legislative Assembly Election, 2013: Mandalgarh
Party	Candidate	Votes	%	±%
BJP	Kirti Kumari	83,084		
INC	Vivek Dhakar	64544		
NOTA	None of the Above			
Majority				
Turnout				
Registered electors				

== See also ==
- List of constituencies of the Rajasthan Legislative Assembly
- Bhilwara district
