= Ashwini Vaishnaw =

Indian politician and civil servant (born 1971)

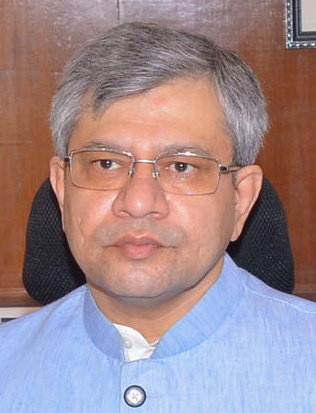
- Vaishnaw in 2021

Union Minister of Information and Broadcasting
- Incumbent
- Assumed office 10 June 2024
- President: Ramnath Kovind; Droupadi Murmu
- Prime Minister: Narendra Modi
- Preceded by: Anurag Singh Thakur

Union Minister of Railways
- Incumbent
- Assumed office 7 July 2021
- Prime Minister: Narendra Modi
- Preceded by: Piyush Goyal

Union Minister of Electronics and Information Technology
- Incumbent
- Assumed office 7 July 2021
- Prime Minister: Narendra Modi
- Preceded by: Ravi Shankar Prasad

Union Minister of Telecommunications
- In office 7 July 2021 – 10 June 2024
- Prime Minister: Narendra Modi
- Preceded by: Ravi Shankar Prasad
- Succeeded by: Jyotiraditya Scindia

Member of Parliament, Rajya Sabha
- Incumbent
- Assumed office 28 June 2019
- Constituency: Odisha

Deputy Secretary in Prime Minister's Office
- In office 2003–2004
- Prime Minister: Atal Bihari Vajpayee

Personal details
- Born: 18 July 1970 (age 56) Jodhpur, Rajasthan, India
- Party: Bharatiya Janata Party
- Spouse: Sunita Vaishnaw (m. 1995)
- Children: 2
- Education: B.E. ECE, M.Tech IM&E, M.B.A.
- Alma mater: Wharton School, University of Pennsylvania (M.B.A.); IIT Kanpur (M.Tech Industrial Management& Engineering); M.B.M. Engineering College; Jai Narain Vyas University (B.E. ECE (Gold Medalist))
- Occupation: Politician; former bureaucrat; businessperson
- Website: www.ashwinivaishnaw.in

Ashwini Vaishnaw (born 18 July 1970) is an Indian politician, former IAS officer and an entrepreneur who is serving as the 39th Minister of Railways, 35th Minister of Information and Broadcasting and 2nd Minister of Electronics and Information Technology since 2024.

He previously served as the Minister of Railways and Minister of Information and Broadcasting, and is the incumbent Minister of Electronics and Information Technology since 2024. He is a member of the Rajya Sabha from Odisha representing Bharatiya Janata Party since 2019.

== Early life and education ==
Vaishnaw is originally a resident of Jeewand Kallan village of Pali district, Rajasthan. Later, his family settled in Jodhpur, Rajasthan.

Vaishnaw attended St. Anthony's Convent School, Jodhpur, and Mahesh School, Jodhpur. He graduated in 1991 from MBM Engineering College, Jodhpur, with a gold medal in Electronics and Communications Engineering and then completed a Masters in Engineering from IIT Kanpur, before joining the Indian Administrative Service in 1994 with an all-India rank of 27. In 2008, Vaishnaw left for the US to do his MBA from Wharton School of the University of Pennsylvania.

== Civil servant ==
In 1994, Vaishnaw joined the Indian Administrative Service in the Odisha cadre. He worked extensively in different parts of Odisha including serving as the District Collector of Balasore and Cuttack districts. At the time of super cyclone 1999, he managed to collect data related to real timing and place of cyclone, by collecting that data Government of Odisha took safety measurements for people of Odisha. He worked in Odisha till 2003 when he was appointed deputy secretary in the office of former Prime Minister Atal Bihari Vajpayee. After his brief stint in the PMO where he contributed to creating the public-private-partnership framework in infrastructure projects, Vaishnaw was appointed Vajpayee's private secretary after the BJP-led NDA lost the election in 2004.

In 2006, he became the deputy chairman of Mormugao Port Trust, where he worked for two years.

== Business and entrepreneurship ==
He took an educational loan to complete his MBA at the Wharton Business School.

After his MBA, Vaishnaw returned to India and joined GE Transportation as its managing director. Subsequently, he joined Siemens as the Vice President of Locomotives & Head Urban Infrastructure Strategy.

In 2012, he set up Three Tee Auto Logistics Private Limited and Vee Gee Auto Components Private Limited, both of which are automotive components manufacturing units located in Gujarat.

== Political career ==
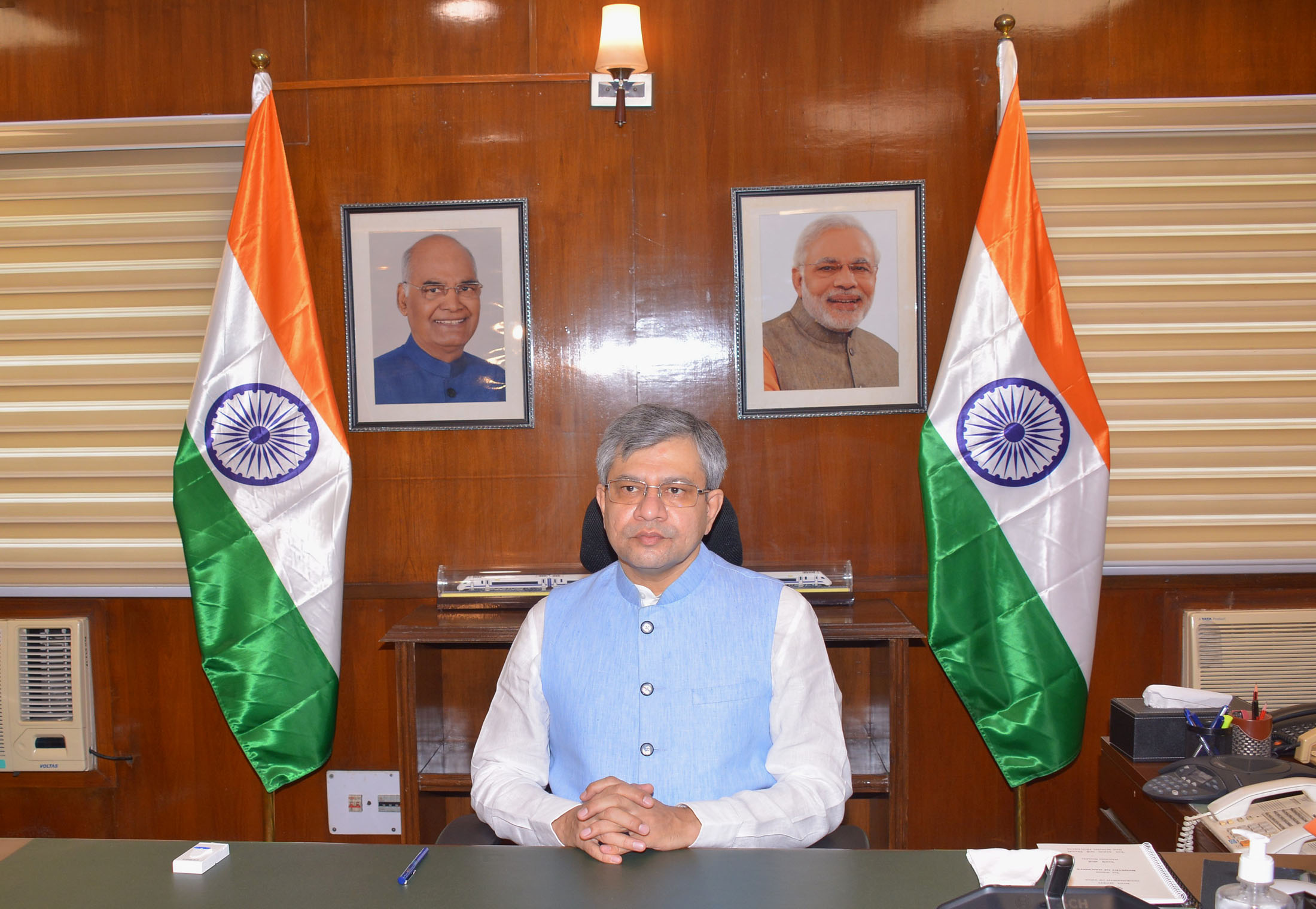
Vaishnaw taking charge as Minister of Railways in New Delhi on 8 July 2021.

Vaishnaw currently serves as a Member of the Indian Parliament, representing the state of Odisha in the Rajya Sabha. He won the Rajya Sabha election unopposed with the help of Biju Janata Dal members in Odisha. Vaishnaw was appointed as member of Committee on Subordinate Legislation and Petitions and Committee on Science and Technology, Environment and Forests.

In 2019, Vaishnaw stated in Parliament that the economic slowdown India was experiencing at the time was cyclical, rather than structural, and that it was expected to bottom out by March 2020, with growth to follow. He emphasized that the focus should be on investment, rather than consumption, as a strategy for building the country’s economy.

Vaishnaw also supported the Taxation Laws (Amendment) Bill, 2019 on 5 December 2019 in Rajya Sabha. He believed the step of reducing or rather rationalizing the tax structure would increase the competitiveness of Indian industry and would also develop the capital base of the Indian industry.

Apart from these, he has also spoken on issues ranging from the proposed Ship Recycling Bill to women protection in the Rajya Sabha.

== Union minister ==
=== Cabinet Minister in Modi 2.0 ===
In 2021, Vaishnaw was appointed to hold the dual charge of Ministry for Railways and the Ministry for Information Technology. As the union telecom minister, he launched the Sanchar Saathi portal in May 2023.

=== Cabinet Minister in Modi 3.0 ===
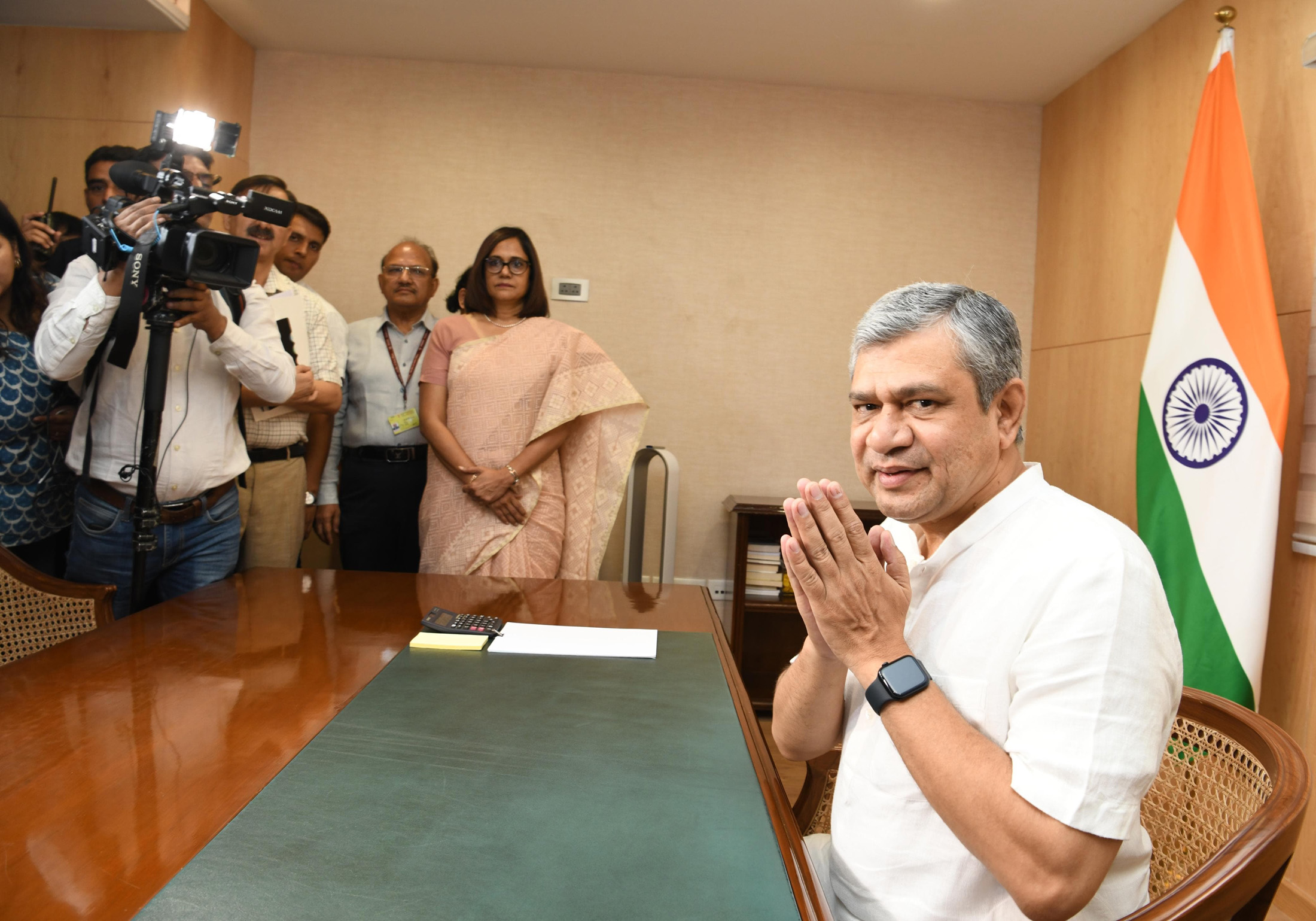
Vaishnaw assuming charge as the Minister of Railways at Rail Bhavan for the second time

In June 2024, during the 22nd cabinet reshuffle, he was entrusted with the Ministry of Railways, Ministry of Electronics and Information Technology and Ministry of Information and Broadcasting.

== See also ==
- Piyush Goyal

Political offices
Preceded by Ravi Shankar Prasad	Minister of Communications; 7 July 2021 – 9 June 2024	Succeeded by Jyotiraditya Scindia
Preceded by Ravi Shankar Prasad	Minister of Electronics and Information Technology; 7 July 2021 – Present	Incumbent
Preceded by Piyush Goyal	Minister of Railways; 7 July 2021 – Present	Incumbent
