= Pichhore Assembly constituency =

Constituency of the Madhya Pradesh legislative assembly in India

Coordinates: 25.18°N 78.18°E

Pichhore
- Constituency No. 26 for the Madhya Pradesh Legislative Assembly

Constituency details
- Country: India
- Region: Central India
- State: Madhya Pradesh
- District: Shivpuri
- Lok Sabha constituency: Guna
- Established: 1957
- Reservation: None

Member of Legislative Assembly
- 16th Madhya Pradesh Legislative Assembly
- Incumbent Preetam Lodhi
- Party: Bharatiya Janata Party
- Elected year: 2023
- Preceded by: K. P. Singh Kakkaju

Pichhore Assembly constituency is one of the 230 Vidhan Sabha (Legislative Assembly) constituencies of Madhya Pradesh state in central India.

== Overview ==
Shivpuri (constituency number 26) is one of the 5 Vidhan Sabha constituencies located in Shivpuri district. This constituency covers the entire Khaniyadhana tehsil, Pichhore nagar panchayat and part of Pichhore tehsil of the district.

Pichhore is part of Guna Lok Sabha constituency along with seven other Vidhan Sabha segments, namely, Shivpuri and Kolaras in this district, Bamori and Guna in Guna district and Ashok Nagar, Chanderi and Mungaoli in Ashoknagar district.

== Members of Legislative Assembly ==
=== As a constituency of Madhya Bharat ===
- 1957: Laxmi Narayan Gupta, Hindu Mahasabha

=== As a constituency of Madhya Pradesh ===
Election	Member	Party
1962	Abdhesh Dhakad	Indian National Congress
1967	Laxmi Narayan Gupta	Swatantra Party
1972	Bhanu Pratap Singh	Indian National Congress
1977	Kamal Singh	Janata Party
1980	Bhaiya Saheb	Indian National Congress (I)
1985	Bhaiya Saheb	Indian National Congress
1990	Laxmi Narayan Gupta	Bharatiya Janata Party
1993	K.P. Singh Kakkaju	Indian National Congress
1998	K.P. Singh Kakkaju	Indian National Congress
2003	K.P. Singh Kakkaju	Indian National Congress
2008	K.P. Singh Kakkaju	Indian National Congress
2013	K.P. Singh Kakkaju	Indian National Congress
2018	K.P. Singh Kakkaju	Indian National Congress
2023	Preetam Lodhi	Bharatiya Janata Party

== Election results ==
=== 2023 ===
2023 Madhya Pradesh Legislative Assembly election: Pichhore
Party	Candidate	Votes	%	±%
BJP	Preetam Lodhi	121,228	52.48	+6.79
INC	Arvind Singh Lodhi	99,346	43.01	−4.05
BSP	Santsingh Adiwasi	2,208	0.96	−1.35
NOTA	None of the above	2,176	0.94	−0.32
Majority		21,882	9.47	+8.1
Turnout		230,989	86.08	+0.84
BJP gain from INC		Swing		

=== 2018 ===
2018 Madhya Pradesh Legislative Assembly election: Pichhore
Party	Candidate	Votes	%	±%
INC	K. P. Singh Kakkaju	91,463	47.06	
BJP	Preetam Lodhi	88,788	45.69	
BSP	Lalaram Yadav (Jamundhana)	4,488	2.31	
Independent	Sunil Sharma	2,495	1.28	
Pragatisheel Manav Samaj Party	Jitendra Singh Majhi	1,984	1.02	
NOTA	None of the above	2,443	1.26	
Majority		2,675	1.37	
Turnout		194,337	85.24	
INC gain from		Swing		

== See also ==
- Pichhore (disambiguation)
