= Jagannath Singh =

Jagannath Singh is an Indian male given name and may refer to:

- Jagannath Singh (Madhya Pradesh politician) (1946-2015)
- Jagannath Singh (Assam politician)
- Jagannath Singh (revolutionary) (1744-1790)
- Jagannath Singh Raghuwanshi, Indian politician
- Jagannath Singh College, Udharbond, Assam, India
