= Jaora Assembly constituency =

Constituency of the Madhya Pradesh legislative assembly in India

Coordinates: 23.64°N 75.13°E

Jaora
- Constituency No. 222 for the Madhya Pradesh Legislative Assembly

Constituency details
- Country: India
- Region: Central India
- State: Madhya Pradesh
- District: Ratlam
- Lok Sabha constituency: Mandsour
- Established: 1972
- Reservation: None

Member of Legislative Assembly
- 16th Madhya Pradesh Legislative Assembly
- Incumbent Rajendra Pandey
- Party: Bharatiya Janata Party
- Elected year: 2023
- Preceded by: Mahendra Singh Kalukheda

Jaora Assembly constituency is one of the 230 Vidhan Sabha (Legislative Assembly) constituencies of Madhya Pradesh state in central India.

It is part of Ratlam district. There is a very famous holy place of Muslim community located here named "Hussain Tekri". The current MLA is Dr. Rajendra Pandey who is from BJP.

== Members of the Legislative Assembly ==
Election	Name	Party
1957	Kailash Nath Katju	Indian National Congress
1962	Laxminarayan Jamnalal	Bharatiya Jana Sangh
1967	Bankatelal Todi	Indian National Congress
1972	Bankatelal Todi	Indian National Congress
1977	Komal Singh Rathore	Janata Party
1980	Kunwar Bharat Singh	Indian National Congress (Indira)
1985	Kunwar Bharat Singh	Indian National Congress
1990	Rugnath Singh Aanjana Patel	Bharatiya Janata Party
1993	Mahendra Singh Kalukheda	Indian National Congress
1998	Mahendra Singh Kalukheda	Indian National Congress
2003	Rajendra Pandey	Bharatiya Janata Party
2008	Mahendra Singh Kalukheda	Indian National Congress
2013	Rajendra Pandey	Bharatiya Janata Party
2018	Rajendra Pandey	Bharatiya Janata Party
2023	Rajendra Pandey	Bharatiya Janata Party

== Election results ==
=== 2023 ===
2023 Madhya Pradesh Legislative Assembly election: Jaora
Party	Candidate	Votes	%	±%
BJP	Rajendra Pandey	92,019	44.89	+8.4
INC	Virendra Singh Solanki	65,998	32.19	−4.01
Independent	Jeevan Singh Sherpur	40,766	19.89	
ASP(KR)	Dilavar Khan	2,154	1.05	
NOTA	None of the above	1,100	0.54	−0.31
Majority		26,021	12.7	+12.41
Turnout		205,006	86.26	+2.05
BJP hold		Swing		

=== 2018 ===
2018 Madhya Pradesh Legislative Assembly election: Jaora
Party	Candidate	Votes	%	±%
BJP	Rajendra Pandey	64,503	36.49	
INC	K. K. Singh Kalukheda	63,992	36.2	
Independent	Shyambihari Patel	23,672	13.39	
Independent	Dr. Hamirsingh Rathore	16,593	9.39	
Bahujan Sangharsh Dal	Raghunath Parihar Foujji	3,436	1.94	
NOTA	None of the above	1,510	0.85	
Majority		511	0.29	
Turnout		176,778	84.21	
BJP hold		Swing		

== See also ==
- Jaora
