= Preetam Lodhi =

Indian politician

Preetam Singh Lodhi (born 1959) is an Indian politician from Madhya Pradesh, India. He is an MLA of Bharatiya Janata Party from Pichhore Assembly constituency of Shivpuri district. He won the 2023 Madhya Pradesh Legislative Assembly election. He received a total of 121,228 votes and won with the margin of 21,882 votes by defeating Congress candidate Arvindra Singh Lodhi. BJP made Preetam Singh Lodhi its candidate for the third time. In 2013 and 2018 also, BJP fielded him against Congress's KP Singh and Preetam Singh lost both elections by less margin.

== Election results ==
Election Result Summary
Year	Votes	Margin	Opponent
2023	121,228	21,882	Arvindra Singh Lodhi

== See also ==
- Bharatiya Janata Party
- Madhya Pradesh Legislative Assembly
