= Jagannath Singh Raghuwanshi =

Indian politician

Jagannath Singh Raghuwanshi (born 1948) is an Indian politician from Madhya Pradesh, India. He is an MLA of Bharatiya Janata Party from Chanderi Assembly constituency of Ashoknagar district. He won the 2023 Madhya Pradesh Legislative Assembly election by defeating 2-time MLA Gopal Singh Chauhan (Daggi Raja) of Indian National Congress. Raghuwanshi received a total of 85,064 votes and won with the margin of 21,768 votes.
