= Laxmi Narayan Gupta =

Indian politician

Member of the Madhya Pradesh Parliament for Pichhore Vidhan Sabha
- Incumbent
- Assumed office 1952

Laxmi Narayan Gupta was an Indian politician from the state of the Madhya Pradesh. He represented Pichhore Vidhan Sabha constituency in Madhya Pradesh Legislative Assembly by winning General election of 1952 देश के सबसे वरिष्ठ भाजपा नेता जो 1952 में विधायक बने थे.
