= Shivpuri Assembly constituency =

Constituency of the Madhya Pradesh legislative assembly in India

Coordinates: 25.43°N 77.66°E

Shivpuri
- Constituency No. 25 for the Madhya Pradesh Legislative Assembly

Constituency details
- Country: India
- Region: Central India
- State: Madhya Pradesh
- District: Shivpuri
- Lok Sabha constituency: Guna
- Established: 1951
- Reservation: None

Member of Legislative Assembly
- 16th Madhya Pradesh Legislative Assembly
- Incumbent Devendra Kumar Jain
- Party: Bharatiya Janata Party
- Elected year: 2023
- Preceded by: Yashodhara Raje Scindia

Shivpuri (शिवपुरी) Assembly constituency is one of the 230 Vidhan Sabha (Legislative Assembly) constituencies of Madhya Pradesh state in central India. This constituency came into existence in 1951, as Shivpuri Kolaras, one of the 79 Vidhan Sabha constituencies of the erstwhile Madhya Bharat state.

== Overview ==
Shivpuri (constituency number 25) is one of the 5 Vidhan Sabha constituencies located in Shivpuri district. This constituency covers parts of Shivpuri and Pichhore tehsils of the district.

Shivpuri is part of Guna Lok Sabha constituency along with seven other Vidhan Sabha segments, namely, Pichhore and Kolaras in this district, Bamori and Guna in Guna district and Ashok Nagar, Chanderi and Mungaoli in Ashoknagar district.

== Members of Legislative Assembly ==
Madhya Bharat: Shivpuri – Kolaras
Year	Member	Party
1951	Tula Ram	Indian National Congress
1951	Narhari Prashad	Indian National Congress

As Shivpuri constituency of Madhya Pradesh:

Year	Member	Party
1977	Mahavir Prasad Jain	Janata Party
1980	Ganeshram Gautam	Indian National Congress (Indira)
1985	Ganeshram Gautam	Indian National Congress
1990	Sushil Bahadur Asthana	Independent politician
1993	Devendra Kumar Jain	Bharatiya Janata Party
1998	Yashodhara Raje Scindia	Bharatiya Janata Party
2003	Yashodhara Raje Scindia	Bharatiya Janata Party
2006^	Vierndra Singh Raghuwanshi	Indian National Congress
2008	Makhan Lal Rathore	Bharatiya Janata Party
2013	Yashodhara Raje Scindia	Bharatiya Janata Party
2018	Yashodhara Raje Scindia	Bharatiya Janata Party
2023	Devendra Kumar Jain	Bharatiya Janata Party

^ By-Poll

== Election results ==
Vote share of winning candidates
2023	56.74%
2018	51.50%
2013	50.14%
1998	50.47%

=== 2023 ===
2023 Madhya Pradesh Legislative Assembly election: Shivpuri
Party	Candidate	Votes	%	±%
BJP	Devendra Kumar Jain	112,324	56.74	+5.24
INC	K. P. Singh	69,294	35.01	+1.01
BSP	Abran Singh Gurjar	10,703	5.41	−3.05
NOTA	None of the above	1,389	0.7	−0.53
Majority		43,030	21.73	+4.23
Turnout		197,952	76.55	+5.41
BJP hold		Swing		

=== 2018 ===
2018 Madhya Pradesh Legislative Assembly election: Shivpuri
Party	Candidate	Votes	%	±%
BJP	Yashodhara Raje Scindia	84,570	51.5	
INC	Siddharth Ladha	55,822	34.0	
BSP	Mohammad Irshad Rayeen	13,889	8.46	
Sapaks Party	Brajesh Singh Tomar (Patrkar)	2,147	1.31	
Rashtriya Rakshak Morcha	Komal Prasad Koli	1,522	0.93	
NOTA	None of the above	2,018	1.23	
Majority		28,748	17.5	
Turnout		164,201	71.14	
BJP hold		Swing		

=== 2013 ===
2013 Madhya Pradesh Legislative Assembly election: Shivpuri
Party	Candidate	Votes	%	±%
BJP	Yashodhara Raje Scindia	76,330	50.14%	
INC	Birendra Raghuwanshi	65,185	42.82%	
NOTA	None of the Above	2,720	1.79	
Majority		28,748		
Turnout		152220	68.4%	
BJP hold		Swing		

=== 1998 ===
1998 Madhya Pradesh Legislative Assembly election: Shivpuri
Party	Candidate	Votes	%	±%
BJP	Yashodhara Raje Scindia	49,205	50.47	
INC	Hari Ballabh Shukla	41,905	42.98	
BSP	Karan Singh ( Veer Singh Gurjar)	4,861	4.99	
Ajeya Bharat Party	Om Prakash Raghuvanshi	603	0.62	
Independent	Smt. Mani Garg	429	0.44	
Majority		7,300	7.49	
Turnout		97,503	57.95	
BJP hold		Swing		

== See also ==
- Shivpuri
