= Mahendra Singh Yadav =

Indian politician

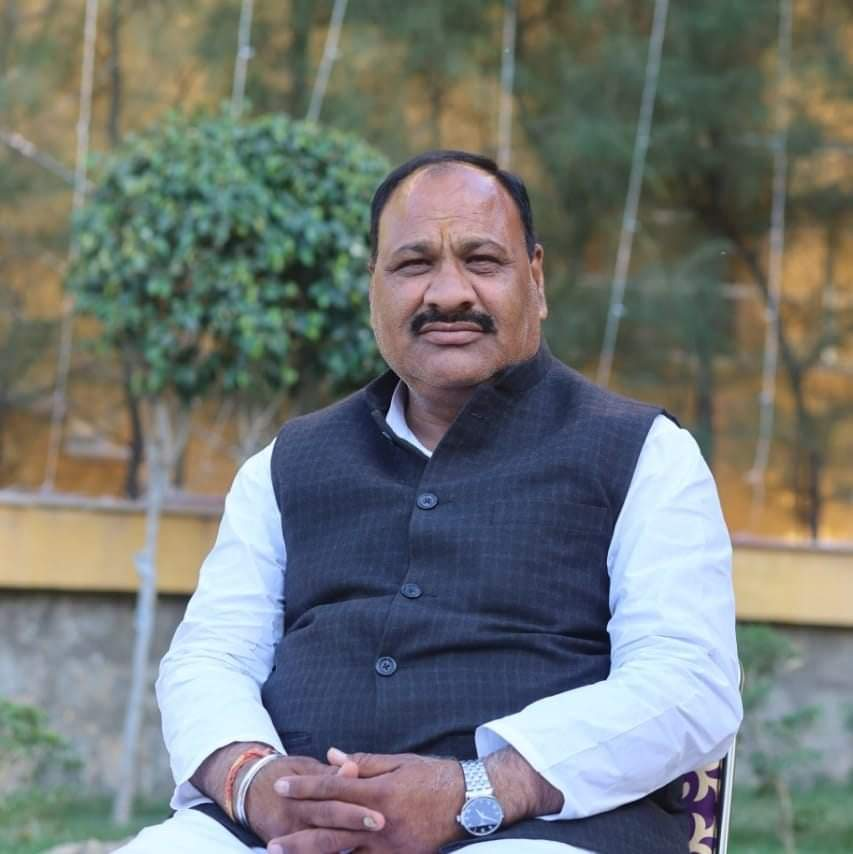

Member of the Madhya Pradesh Legislative Assembly
- Incumbent
- Assumed office 2023
- Constituency: kolaras
- In office March 2018 – December 2018
- Constituency: Kolaras

Personal details
- Born: 26 April 1969 (age 56) Village Taravali, Shivpuri
- Citizenship: indian
- Party: Bharatiya Janata Party
- Spouse: Rajkumari Yadav
- Children: 4
- Parent: Ram Singh Yadav (father)
- Education: HSC
- Profession: Politician
- As of 13 June, 2018 Source: []

Mahendra Ram Singh Yadav Khatora (born 1969) is an Indian politician from Madhya Pradesh. He is currently the MLA from Kolaras Assembly constituency representing Bharatiya Janata Party.

== Early life and education ==
Yadav is from Kolaras, Shivpuri District, Madhya Pradesh. He married Rajkumari Yadav, with whom he has two sons, Lokendra Yadav and Jay Yadav, and two daughters, Neha Yadav and Megha Yadav. His father Ram Singh Yadav was a farmer and former MLA. He completed his Class 12 at I.T.B.P. School, Shivpuri in 1988 and passed the examination conducted by Senior Central Secondary Education Board.

== Career ==
Yadav was first elected in the 2018 bypolls, after the death of his father Ram Singh Yadav after he shifted to Bharatiya Janata Party along with Jyotiraditya Scindia. He retained the seat winning the 2023 Madhya Pradesh Legislative Assembly election from Kolaras Assembly constituency representing the BJP.

== See also ==
- Madhya Pradesh Legislative Assembly
