= Gopal Lal Sharma =

Indian politician

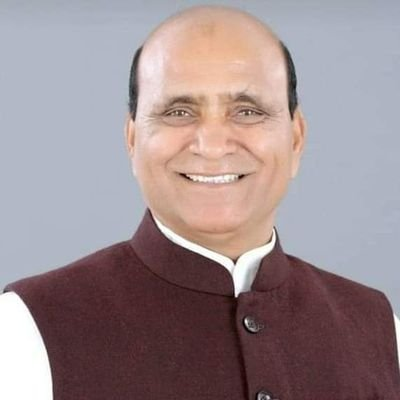

Member of the Rajasthan Legislative Assembly
- Incumbent
- Assumed office 8 December 2018
- Preceded by: Vivek Dhakar
- Constituency: Mandalgarh

Personal details
- Political party: BJP
- Occupation: Politician

Gopal Lal Sharma is an Indian politician currently serving as a member of the 16th Rajasthan Legislative Assembly, representing the Mandalgarh constituency. He previously served as an MLA from 2018 to 2023, also representing the same constituency.

== Political career ==
In the 2018 Rajasthan Legislative Assembly election, he was elected as an MLA from the Mandalgarh constituency, defeating Vivek Dhakar by 10,333 votes.

Following the 2023 Rajasthan Legislative Assembly election, he was re-elected as an MLA from the Mandalgarh constituency, defeating Vivek Dhakar, the candidate from the Indian National Congress (INC), by a margin of 8194 votes.
