= Omprakash Khatik =

Indian politician

Member of the Madhya Pradesh Legislative Assembly
- In office 2003–2008
- Preceded by: Pooran Singh Bedia
- Succeeded by: Devendra Kumar Jain
- Constituency: Kolaras
- In office 1990–1998
- Preceded by: Pooran Singh Bedia
- Succeeded by: Pooran Singh Bedia
- Constituency: Kolaras

Personal details
- Born: 1 January 1950
- Party: Bhartiya Janata Party
- Occupation: Politician
- Profession: Business

Omprakash Khatik is an Indian politician belonging to Bhartiya Janata Party. He was three times member of the Madhya Pradesh Legislative Assembly, in 1990, 1993 and 2003, representing Kolaras. Omprakash khatik is a senior BJP leader.
