= Krishna Pal Singh Yadav =

Indian politician

Dr. Krishna Pal Singh Yadav

Member of Parliament, Lok Sabha
- In office 23 May 2019 – 4 June 2024
- Preceded by: Jyotiraditya M. Scindia
- Succeeded by: Jyotiraditya M. Scindia
- Constituency: Guna, Madhya Pradesh

Personal details
- Born: 15 January 1976 (age 50) Ashoknagar, Madhya Pradesh, India
- Party: Bharatiya Janata Party
- Education: Bhau Mulak Ayurvedic University, Nagpur (B.A.M.S. 2000-2001)
- Profession: Politician; ayurvedic practitioner

Krishna Pal Singh Yadav (born 15 January 1976; Hindi pronunciation: [kɾɪʂɳə paːl sɪŋgʱ jaːd̪əʋ]) is an Indian politician and a former Member of Parliament from Madhya Pradesh's Guna constituency in the 17th Lok Sabha. He defeated INC candidate Jyotiraditya M. Scindia during the 2019 Indian general elections. Yadav had even worked as Scindia's representative as MP before he parted ways with him ahead of the 2018 MP assembly polls due to a dispute about him being denied ticket from the Mungaoli constituency.

== Early life ==
Yadav was born to Raghuveer Singh. He completed his Bachelor of Ayurveda, Medicine and Surgery degree from Bhau Mulak Ayurvedic University, Nagpur in 2000-2001. He is an Ayurvedic practitioner.
