= Mungaoli Assembly constituency =

Assembly constituency in Madhya Pradesh

Coordinates: 24.41°N 78.10°E

Mungaoli
- Constituency No. 34 for the Madhya Pradesh Legislative Assembly

Constituency details
- Country: India
- Region: Central India
- State: Madhya Pradesh
- District: Ashok Nagar
- Lok Sabha constituency: Guna
- Established: 1951
- Reservation: None

Member of Legislative Assembly
- 16th Madhya Pradesh Legislative Assembly
- Incumbent Brajendra Singh Yadav
- Party: Bharatiya Janata Party
- Elected year: 2023
- Preceded by: Mahendra Singh Kalukheda

Mungaoli Assembly constituency is one of the 230 Vidhan Sabha (Legislative Assembly) constituencies of Madhya Pradesh state in central India. This constituency came into existence in 1951, as one of the 79 Vidhan Sabha constituencies of the erstwhile Madhya Bharat state.

== Overview ==
Mungaoli (constituency number 34) is one of the 3 Vidhan Sabha constituencies located in Ashok Nagar district. This constituency presently covers the entire Mungaoli tehsil and part of Chanderi tehsil of the district.

Mungaoli is part of Guna Lok Sabha constituency along with seven other Vidhan Sabha segments, namely, Chanderi and Ashok Nagar in this district, Bamori and in Guna in Guna district, Shivpuri, Pichhore and Kolaras in Shivpuri district.

== Members of Legislative Assembly ==
=== Madhya Bharat Legislative Assembly ===
Election	Name	Party
1952	Kundanlal Madanlal	Indian National Congress

=== Madhya Pradesh Legislative Assembly ===
Election	Name	Party
1957	Khalak Singh Yadav	Akhil Bharatiya Hindu Mahasabha
1962	Chandrabhan Singh	Praja Socialist Party
1967	Chandan Singh Yadav Belai	Swatantra Party
1972	Gajram Singh Yadav	Bharatiya Jana Sangh
1977	Chandramohan Rawat	Janata Party
1980	Gajram Singh Yadav	Indian National Congress (Indira)
1985	Gajram Singh Yadav	Indian National Congress
1990	Rao Deshraj Singh Yadav	Bharatiya Janata Party
1993	Anand Kumar Paliwal	Indian National Congress
1998	Rao Deshraj Singh Yadav	Bharatiya Janata Party
2003	Gopal Singh Chauhan	Indian National Congress
2008	Rao Deshraj Singh Yadav	Bharatiya Janata Party
2013	Mahendra Singh Kalukheda	Indian National Congress
(Note: by-poll)	Brajendra Singh Yadav	Indian National Congress
2018	Brajendra Singh Yadav	Indian National Congress
2020^ (Note: by-poll)	Brajendra Singh Yadav	Bharatiya Janata Party
2023	Brajendra Singh Yadav	Bharatiya Janata Party

== Election results ==
=== 2023 ===
2023 Madhya Pradesh Legislative Assembly election: Mungaoli
Party	Candidate	Votes	%	±%
BJP	Brajendra Singh Yadav	77,062	44.99	−10.21
INC	Rao Yadvendra Singh	71,640	41.83	+0.88
BSP	Mohan Singh Yadav	15,340	8.96	+7.32
ASP(KR)	Mukesh Lodhi	3,300	1.93	
NOTA	None of the above	1,268	0.74	−0.14
Majority		5,422	3.16	−11.09
Turnout		171,276	79.85	+1.42
BJP hold		Swing		

=== 2020 bypolls ===
2020 Madhya Pradesh Legislative Assembly by-elections: Mungaoli
Party	Candidate	Votes	%	±%
BJP	Brajendra Singh Yadav	83,153	55.2	+16.76
INC	Kanhairam Lodhi	61,684	40.95	+0.96
BSP	Virendra Sharma Bhorakhati	2,474	1.64	−8.62
NOTA	None of the above	1,330	0.88	+0.35
Majority		21,469	14.25	+12.70
Turnout		150,639	78.43	+3.45
BJP gain from INC		Swing		

=== 2018 ===
2018 Madhya Pradesh Legislative Assembly election: Mungaoli
Party	Candidate	Votes	%	±%
INC	Brajendra Singh Yadav	55,346	39.99	
BJP	Krishna Pal Singh	53,210	38.44	
BSP	Kamal Singh	14,202	10.26	
AAP	Devendra Lodhi	3,999	2.89	
Sapaks Party	Malkeet Singh Sandhu	3,459	2.5	
Rashtriya Mahan Ganatantra Party	Ganesh Ram Kewat Khair Khadi	1,253	0.91	
NOTA	None of the above	740	0.53	
Majority		2,136	1.55	
Turnout		138,406	74.98	
INC gain from		Swing		

== See also ==
- Mungaoli
