= Brajendra Singh Yadav =

Indian politician, Minister of state member of the Madhya Pradesh Legislative Assembly

Member of the Madhya Pradesh Legislative Assembly
- Incumbent
- Assumed office 28 February 2018
- Preceded by: Mahendra Singh Kalukheda
- Constituency: Mungaoli

Personal details
- Born: 24 June 1969 (age 56) Village Amrod, Ashoknagar
- Party: Bhartiya Janata Party
- Spouse: Suvita Yadav
- Children: Arjun Singh Yadav Priyanka Yadav Rahul Yadav
- Parent: Gajram Singh Yadav (father)
- Profession: Politician, Agriculturist
- As of 13 June, 2018 Source: ["Biography:Yadav, Brajendra Singh" (PDF). Madhya Pradesh Legislative Assembly.]

Brajendra Singh Yadav is an Indian politician. He is a fourth time Member of the Madhya Pradesh Legislative Assembly representing Mungaoli for the Bhartiya Janata Party. He holds the record for winning three consecutive elections from same constituency in a span of just 32 months that too with an increase in winning margin every time(2018 by-election, 2018 general election, 2020 by-election). He was first elected in the 2018 bypolls, after the demise of sitting MLA Mahendra Singh Kalukheda.

== Personal life ==
Mr Yadav was born to a noble social worker, politician and farmer Rao Gajram Singh Yadav & Prem Yadav in Amrod village. He started living in Surel village after being adopted by his father's elder brother Rao Govind Singh Yadav & Janki Yadav having no child. He is married to Mrs. Suvita Yadav and has two sons(Arjun Singh Yadav and Rahul Yadav) and one daughter(Priyanka Yadav). Arjun is a Chemical Engineering graduate from IIT Delhi and Rahul is pursuing his MBBS from Gandhi Medical College, Bhopal. Priyanka is an MBA Postgraduate from IPER Bhopal.

== Political life ==
Yadav started his political career in 2005 when he was elected unanimously to represent Amrod seat in Panchayat samiti (block). He started raising farmers issue and was made the District President of Kissan Congress. In 2010 Mrs Suvita Yadav was elected to represent the same Panchayat samiti (block) seat. She was elected as vice-president of Panchayat samiti unanimously.

Often considered as a humble politician without enemies, he is known for his unanimous elections at his Panchayat and Panchayat samiti.

He was first elected as MLA from Mungaoli Vidhansabha constituency after winning a by-election on 28 February 2018. He was again elected from same constituency on 11 December 2018 Assembly elections.

Mr. Singh resigned from his assembly seat in March 2020 along with other MLAs after the rebellion due to non-fulfilment of promises by Congress government in state.

== See also ==
- Madhya Pradesh Legislative Assembly
