= Chanderi Assembly constituency =

Constituency of the Madhya Pradesh legislative assembly in India

Coordinates: 24.71°N 78.14°E

Chanderi
- Constituency No. 33 for the Madhya Pradesh Legislative Assembly

Constituency details
- Country: India
- Region: Central India
- State: Madhya Pradesh
- District: Ashok Nagar
- Lok Sabha constituency: Guna
- Established: 2008
- Reservation: None

Member of Legislative Assembly
- 16th Madhya Pradesh Legislative Assembly
- Incumbent Jagannath Singh Raghuwanshi
- Party: Bharatiya Janata Party
- Elected year: 2023
- Preceded by: Gopal Singh Chauhan

Chanderi Assembly constituency is one of the 230 Vidhan Sabha (Legislative Assembly) constituencies of Madhya Pradesh state in central India. This constituency came into existence in 2008, following the delimitation of the Legislative Assembly constituencies.

== Overview ==
Chanderi (constituency number 33) is one of the 3 Vidhan Sabha constituencies located in Ashok Nagar district. This constituency covers the entire Isagarh tehsil, entire Naisarai tehsil and part of Chanderi tehsil of the Ashoknagar district.

Chanderi is part of Guna Lok Sabha constituency along with seven other namely, Ashok Nagar and Mungaoli in Ashoknagar district, Bamori and Guna in Guna district, Shivpuri, Pichhore and Kolaras in Shivpuri district.

== Members of Legislative Assembly ==
Election	Member	Party
2008	Rao Rajkumar Singh Yadav	Bharatiya Janata Party
2013	Gopal Singh Chauhan	Indian National Congress
2018	Gopal Singh Chauhan	Indian National Congress
2023	Jagannath Singh Raghuwanshi	Bharatiya Janata Party

== Election results ==
=== 2023 ===
2023 Madhya Pradesh Legislative Assembly election: Chanderi
Party	Candidate	Votes	%	±%
BJP	Jagannath Singh Raghuwanshi	85,064	53.49	+22.34
INC	Gopal Singh Chauhan	63,296	39.8	+5.47
BSP	Virendra Singh Yadav	5,598	3.52	−22.59
ASP(KR)	Ranveer Singh Adiwasi	1,525	0.96	
NOTA	None of the above	1,452	0.91	+0.24
Majority		21,768	13.69	+10.51
Turnout		159,019	80.25	+4.23
BJP gain from INC		Swing		

=== 2018 ===
2018 Madhya Pradesh Legislative Assembly election: Chanderi
Party	Candidate	Votes	%	±%
INC	Gopal Singh Chauhan	45,106	34.33	
BJP	Bhupendra Dwivedi	40,931	31.15	
BSP	Rao Rajkumar Singh Yadav	34,302	26.11	
Independent	Lalaram Rickwar	1,719	1.31	
NOTA	None of the above	884	0.67	
Majority		4,175	3.18	
Turnout		131,379	76.02	
INC hold		Swing		

== See also ==
- Chanderi
- Isagarh
