= Vivek Dhakar =

Indian politician (born 1977)

Member of the Rajasthan Legislative Assembly
- In office 1 February 2018 – 11 December 2018
- Preceded by: Kirti Kumari
- Succeeded by: Gopal Lal Sharma
- Constituency: Mandalgarh, Bhilwara

Personal details
- Born: 18 January 1977 Bhilwara, Rajasthan
- Died: 4 April 2024 (aged 47) Bhilwara, Rajasthan
- Party: Indian National Congress
- Spouse: Padmini Dhakar

Vivek Dhakar was an Indian politician who served as a Member of the Rajasthan Legislative Assembly from the Mandalgarh constituency in Bhilwara district. He was elected in a by-election in 2018 as a candidate for the Indian National Congress. He died by suicide on 4 April 2024.
