= Ministry of Information Technology (India) =

Former government ministry of India

Ministry overview
- Formed: 13 October 1999
- Preceding Ministry: Ministry of Communications
- Dissolved: 22 December 2001
- Superseding Ministry: Ministry of Communications and Information Technology
- Jurisdiction: Government of India

The Ministry of Information Technology is a former cabinet-level ministry of the Government of India which was responsible for promoting internet, IT policy and strategy along with e-commerce and knowledge-based industries. The ministry also included the Department of Electronics and took over the Internet and e-commerce services from the Ministry of Communications. The ministry was established on 13 October 1999 by then Prime Minister Atal Bihari Vajpayee.

The Ministry of Information Technology was merged with the Ministry of Communications to form the Ministry of Communications and Information Technology on 22 December 2001. In 2016, the Ministry of Communications and Information Technology was further bifurcated to form the Ministry of Communications and the Ministry of Electronics and Information Technology. Upon the merger, the Department of Information Technology and later the Department of Electronics and IT was created.

== Ministers ==
Portrait	Minister (Birth-Death) Constituency	Term of office			Political party	Ministry	Prime Minister
Portrait	Minister (Birth-Death) Constituency	From	To	Period	Political party	Ministry	Prime Minister
	Atal Bihari Vajpayee (1924–2018); MP for Lucknow (Prime Minister)	13 October 1999	22 November 1999	40 days	Bharatiya Janata Party	Vajpayee III	Atal Bihari Vajpayee
	Pramod Mahajan (1949–2006); MP for Maharashtra (Rajya Sabha)	22 November 1999	22 December 2001	2 years, 30 days	Bharatiya Janata Party	Vajpayee III	Atal Bihari Vajpayee
