= Pichhore =

Pichhore may refer to:

Towns in Madhya Pradesh, India

- Pichhore, Gwalior
- Pichhore, Shivpuri
