= Jyotiraditya Scindia =

Indian politician (born 1971)

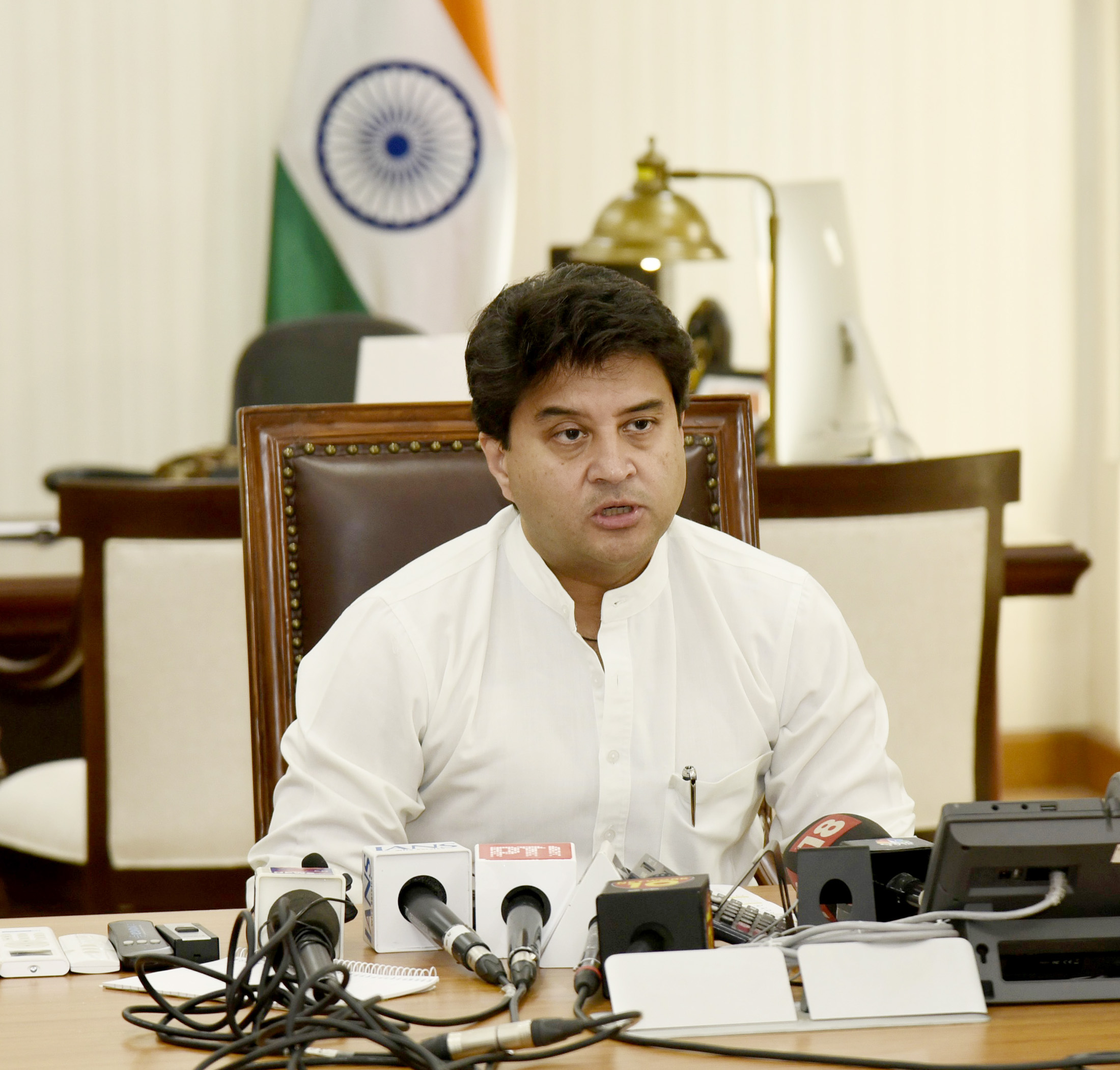
- Scindia in 2025

43rd Union Minister of Communications
- Incumbent
- Assumed office 9 June 2024
- Prime Minister: Narendra Modi
- Preceded by: Ashwini Vaishnaw

10th Union Minister of the Development of North Eastern Region
- Incumbent
- Assumed office 9 June 2024
- Prime Minister: Narendra Modi
- Preceded by: G. Kishan Reddy

34th Union Minister of Steel
- In office 6 July 2022 – 9 June 2024
- Prime Minister: Narendra Modi
- Preceded by: Ramchandra Prasad Singh
- Succeeded by: H. D. Kumaraswamy

32nd Union Minister of Civil Aviation
- In office 7 July 2021 – 9 June 2024
- Prime Minister: Narendra Modi
- Preceded by: Hardeep Singh Puri (as MoS I/C)
- Succeeded by: Kinjarapu Ram Mohan Naidu

30th Union Minister of State (Independent Charge) for Power
- In office 28 October 2012 – 26 May 2014
- Prime Minister: Manmohan Singh
- Preceded by: Veerappa Moily (as Minister)
- Succeeded by: Piyush Goyal

Union Minister of State for Commerce and Industry
- In office 28 May 2009 – 28 October 2012
- Prime Minister: Manmohan Singh
- Minister: Anand Sharma
- Preceded by: Jairam Ramesh
- Succeeded by: Daggubati Purandeswari

Union Minister of State for Communications and Information Technology
- In office 6 April 2008 – 22 May 2009
- Prime Minister: Manmohan Singh
- Minister: Andimuthu Raja
- Preceded by: Shakeel Ahmad
- Succeeded by: Gurudas Kamat

Member of Parliament, Lok Sabha
- Incumbent
- Assumed office 4 June 2024
- Preceded by: Dr. K. P. Yadav
- Constituency: Guna, Madhya Pradesh
- In office 24 February 2002 – 23 May 2019
- Preceded by: Madhavrao Scindia
- Succeeded by: Dr. K. P. Yadav
- Constituency: Guna, Madhya Pradesh

Member of Parliament, Rajya Sabha
- In office 20 June 2020 – 4 June 2024
- Preceded by: Satyanarayan Jatiya
- Succeeded by: George Kurian
- Constituency: Madhya Pradesh

Personal details
- Born: Jyotiraditya Madhavrao Scindia; 1 January 1971 (age 55) Bombay, Maharashtra, India (present-day Mumbai)
- Party: Bharatiya Janata Party (since 2020)
- Other political affiliations: Indian National Congress (2001–2020)
- Spouse: Priyadarshini Raje Scindia (m. 1994)
- Children: Mahanaaryman Scindia (son); Ananya Raje (daughter)
- Parent: Madhavrao Scindia (father)
- Relatives: George Jivaji Rao Scindia (grandfather); Vijaya Raje Scindia (grandmother); Vasundhara Raje Scindia (Aunt); Yashodhara Raje (Aunt); Pradyot Bikram Manikya Deb Barma (cousin); Dushyant Singh (cousin); Devyani Rana (sister); Chitrangada Scindia (sister)
- Education: Harvard University (B.A); Stanford University (MBA)
- Occupation: Politician; social worker
- Family: Scindia family

Jyotiraditya Madhavrao Scindia (born 1 January 1971; Hindi pronunciation: [d͡ʒjoːt̪ɪɾaːd̪ɪt̪jə maːd̪ʱəʋ.ɾaːʋ sɪn̪d̪ʱɪjaː]) is an Indian politician who is serving as the 43rd Minister of Communications and 10th Minister of Development of North Eastern Region since 2024. He was a Member of Parliament in the Rajya Sabha representing the state of Madhya Pradesh from 2020 till his win in the 2024 Lok Sabha elections. He was a Member of Parliament in the Lok Sabha, representing the Guna constituency in Madhya Pradesh from 2002 until his defeat in the 2019 Indian general election, and then since 4 June 2024. He is a member of the Bharatiya Janata Party (BJP) since 2020 and was a former member of the Indian National Congress (INC) from 2001 to 2020. While a member of the INC, he was the Union Minister for Power and Corporate in the second Manmohan Singh ministry from 2012 to 2014.

Scindia is the son of politician Madhavrao Scindia, and a grandson of Jiwajirao Scindia, the last ruler of the princely state of Gwalior during the British Raj in India. Jyotiraditya was briefly the titular Crown Prince of Gwalior in 1971, until the privy purses and titles of Indian royals were abolished by the government in 1971.

== Early life and education ==
Scindia was born on 1 January 1971 in Mumbai to Madhavrao Scindia and Madhavi Raje Scindia. He originally belongs to Maratha caste.

Scindia was educated at Campion School, Mumbai and at The Doon School, Dehradun. At Doon School, Scindia was a contemporary of Rahul Gandhi. He then studied at St. Stephen's College, Delhi. He later went to Harvard College, the undergraduate liberal arts college of Harvard University, where he graduated with BA degree in Economics in 1993. In 2001, he received a Master of Business Administration from the Stanford Graduate School of Business.

Scindia is a grandson of Jiwajirao Scindia, the last Maharaja of the princely state of Gwalior. His father Madhavrao was a politician and a minister in the government of Rajiv Gandhi. His mother, Madhavi Raje (Kiran Rajya Lakshmi Devi), hails from the Rana dynasty of Nepal. He is married to Priyadarshini Raje of the prominent Gaekwad dynasty of Baroda (who studied at Fort Convent School, Mumbai and later Sophia College).

== Political career ==
=== Indian National Congress ===
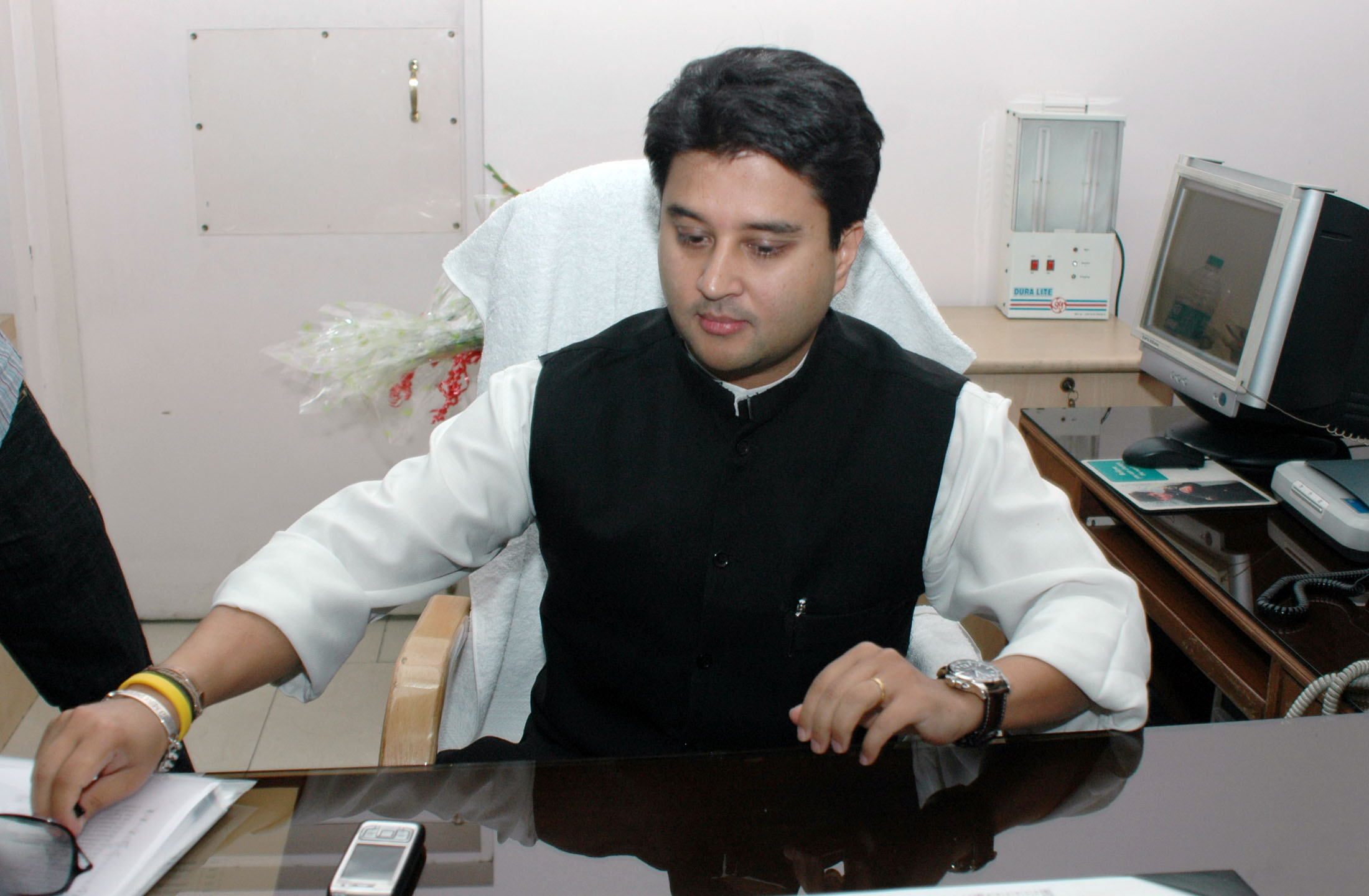
Scindia in 2008 as Minister of State for Communications & Information Technology

On 30 September 2001, the Guna constituency fell vacant due to the death of Scindia's father, the sitting MP Madhavrao Scindia, in an aeroplane crash in Uttar Pradesh. On 18 December, he formally joined the INC and pledged to uphold the "secular, liberal and social justice values" of his father.

On 24 February, he won the by-election in Guna, defeating his nearest rival, Desh Raj Singh Yadav of the BJP, by a margin of approximately 450,000 votes. He was re-elected in May 2004, and was introduced to the Union Council of Ministers in 2007 as Minister of State for Communications and Information Technology. He was then re-elected in 2009 for a third consecutive term and became Minister of State for Commerce and Industry.

He was appointed Minister of State for Communication in 2007 later as minister of state independent charge for Power in a cabinet reshuffle which drafted a number of younger politicians into the Indian cabinet, including two other scions of princely families, R. P. N. Singh and Jitendra Singh.

He was among the richest ministers in the UPA government with assets valued at ₹25 crore (US$2.6 million) including investments in Indian and foreign securities worth over ₹16 crore (US$2 million) and jewellery worth over ₹5.7 crore (US$591,902). In 2010, he filed a legal claim to be the sole inheritor of the property belonging to his late father worth ₹20,000 crore (US$2 billion), however this was challenged in court by his aunts.

He was tasked by the Indian Planning Commission with preventing a repetition of the July 2012 India blackout, the largest power outage in history, which affected over 620 million people (about 9% of the world population). In May 2013, he claimed that checks and balances had been put in place to prevent any recurrence of grid collapse and that India would have the world's largest integrated grid by January 2014.

In 2014, he was elected from Guna. In 2019, he lost his seat to Krishna Pal Singh Yadav. In 2019, he was appointed as General Secretary in-charge for Uttar Pradesh West along with Priyanka Gandhi Vadra.

=== Bharatiya Janata Party ===
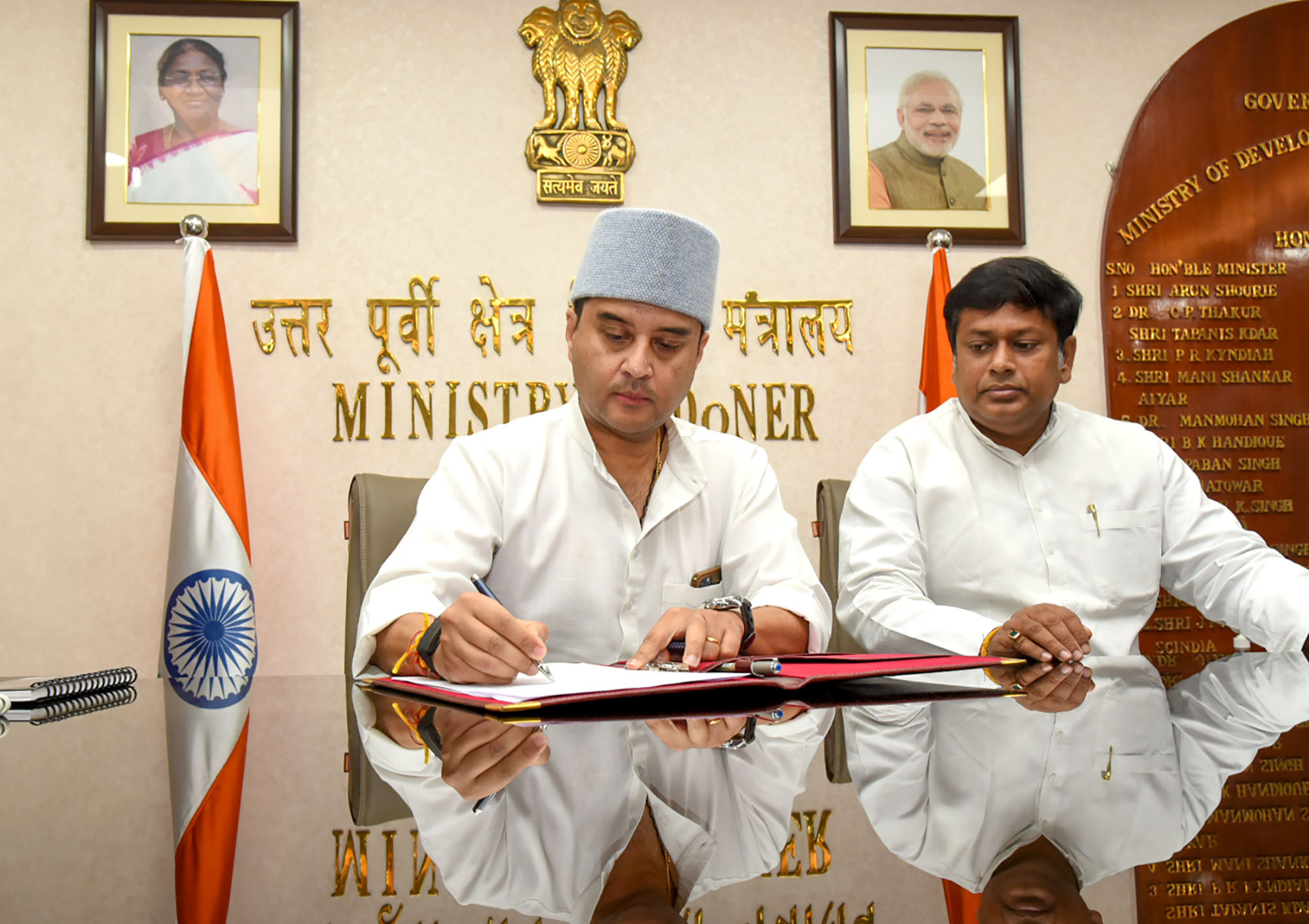
Jyotiraditya M. Scindia assumed charge as the Union Minister of Development of North Eastern Region (DoNER), in New Delhi on June 12, 2024.

Citing disgruntlement with the INC leadership, Scindia quit the Congress party on 10 March 2020. The Congress party then released a statement claiming that he had been expelled for "anti-party activities." He joined the BJP on 11 March 2020. Other MLAs loyal to him also resigned from the INC and their MLA posts. This led to the 2020 Madhya Pradesh political crisis which in turn resulted in the resignation of Kamal Nath as chief minister on 23 March 2020. Nath's replacement, Shivraj Singh Chouhan, was sworn in as chief minister of Madhya Pradesh on 23 March 2020.

On 19 June 2020, Scindia was elected a BJP Rajya Sabha MP from Madhya Pradesh. On 7 July 2021, he was appointed as the Minister of Civil Aviation in Second Modi ministry after a cabinet reshuffle in July 2021.

In February 2022, he was appointed Prime Minister Modi's special envoy to Romania to oversee the evacuation of Indian nationals in Ukraine resulting from the ongoing Russian invasion of Ukraine. As a part of Operation Ganga, he oversaw the evacuation efforts of students and Indian professionals through Bucharest and Suceava.

== Electoral Performance ==
Lok Sabha
Year	Constituency	Party	Votes	%	Opponent	Party	Votes	%	Margin	Margin in %	Results
2001(By-election)	Guna	INC	535,728	74.28	Rao Deshraj Singh Yadav	BJP	1,29,160	17.91	4,06,568	56.37	Won
2004	Guna	INC	330,954	49.96	Harivallabh Shukla	BJP	2,50,594	37.04	86,360	12.92	Won
2009	Guna	INC	413,297	63.59	Narottam Mishra	BJP	1,63,560	25.16	2,49,737	38.43	Won
2014	Guna	INC	517,036	52.94	Jaibhan Singh Pawaiya	BJP	3,96,244	40.57	1,20,792	12.37	Won
2019	Guna	INC	4,88,500	41.45	Krishna Pal Singh Yadav	BJP	614,048	52.11	−1,25,549	−10.66	Lost
2024	Guna	BJP	923,302	67.21	Rao Yadavendra Singh Yadav	INC	3,82,373	27.83	5,40,929	39.38	Won

== Other roles ==
Scindia is the chairman of the regional Madhya Pradesh Cricket Association (MPCA). After the spot fixing scandal in the Indian Premier League was made apparent and Sanjay Jagdale, a member of the MPCA, resigned from his post as secretary in the Board of Control for Cricket in India, Scindia spoke out against corruption in Indian cricket.

He is the president of the Board of Governors of Scindia School and Scindia Kanya Vidyalaya which was founded by his great-grandfather, Madho Rao Scindia, in 1897. He is a hereditary patron of Daly College, Indore which was established in 1870 to educate the children of the royalty, nobility, and aristocracy of Central Indian princely states of the Marathas, Rajputs and Bundelas. He is also the chairman of Madhav Institute of Technology and Science. and President of Samrat Ashok Technological Institute (SATI, Vidisha)

== In media ==
In March 2014, allegations were raised concerning a land transaction in Gwalior involving Jyotiraditya Scindia and two charitable trusts associated with his family. A businessman filed a complaint with the Madhya Pradesh Economic Offences Wing, alleging that land previously declared government property had been sold to a private developer.

Following his departure from the Indian National Congress and joining the Bharatiya Janata Party in 2020, Scindia criticized the previous Congress government in Madhya Pradesh, describing its 15-month tenure as a government of "cuts, commission and corruption". During his tenure with the Congress, Scindia criticized the Bharatiya Janata Party government in Madhya Pradesh, accusing it of corruption in areas including mining and education and in connection with the Vyapam scam.

In September 2026, Sindhya confronted a protester in Guna, Madhya Pradesh, after the protester told him that residents would not vote if the road was not constructed. Scindia objected to the wording and asked the protester not to speak to him in that manner. The video went viral and sparked criticism.

== See also ==
- Jai Vilas Mahal
- Third Modi ministry

Lok Sabha
Preceded by Madhavrao Scindia	Member of Parliament for Guna; 2002–2019	Succeeded by Krishna Pal Singh Yadav
Political offices
Preceded by Veerappa Moily	Minister of Power; 29 October 2012 – 26 May 2014 (Minister of State with Independent charge)	Succeeded by Piyush Goyal (Minister of State with Independent charge)
Preceded by Hardeep Singh Puri (Minister of State with Independent charge)	Minister of Civil Aviation; 7 July 2021 – Present	Incumbent
Preceded by Ramchandra Prasad Singh	Minister of Steel; 6 July 2022 – Present	Incumbent
