= IPER Bhopal =

Indian management institute

Coordinates: 23.1442°N 77.4975°E

Institute of Professional Education & Research (IPER), Bhopal
- Other name: IPER
- Motto: Learning in Action
- Type: College Private
- Established: 1996
- Affiliations: Barkatullah University, AICTE
- Chairman: Shri K.J. Rawtani
- Founder: Chaitanya Shiksha Samiti
- Academic staff: 70+
- Administrative staff: 20+
- Location: Opposite British Park, 11 Mile, Ramji Baba Market, Near Taxi Stand, Narmadapuram Road, Bhopal, Madhya Pradesh, India
- Website: www.iper.ac.in

Institute of Professional Education & Research (IPER), Bhopal is a private institution situated in Bhopal, Madhya Pradesh. It was founded by Chaitanya Shiksha Samiti in 1996 and its courses are affiliated to AICTE, and Barkatullah University, Bhopal.

== Campus location ==
The management institute is located in Bhopal along Bhojpur Road (Bhojpur, Madhya Pradesh), about 11 km from Rani Kamalapati Railway Station. The institution has two multi-storeyed buildings that houses the academics department of two different courses – Undergraduate and Post Graduate programs. Additionally, both the buildings has number of seminar halls, auditoriums, lecture halls, canteen, libraries, computer labs, career center offices and staff rooms..

== Academics ==
The undergraduate programme (BBA, BCOM – Economics, Honors, Marketing, Insurance & Foreign Trade) & Post Graduation programme (MBA) affiliated to Barkatullah University, Bhopal. The Post-Graduation programme is approved by All India Council of Technical Education (AICTE).

== Courses offered ==
Institute of Professional Education offers variety of courses (undergraduate & post-graduate) under the disciplines of management and commerce education –

- Master of Business Administration (MBA)
- Bachelor of Business Administration (BBA)
- Bachelor of Commerce (Economics)
- Bachelor of Commerce (Honors)
- Bachelor of Commerce (Insurance)
- Bachelor of Commerce (Advertising, Sales & Promotion)
- Bachelor of Commerce (Foreign Trade)

== Admission process ==
Admission to the post graduate curriculum - MBA, is done on the basis of Common Management Admission Test (CMAT) score and as per the guidelines set by Directorate of Technical Education (DTE), Madhya Pradesh. For the undergraduate programme, the admission process is managed by the Department of Higher Education, Government of Madhya Pradesh.

== Training and placement ==
Recruiters of IPER includes Nestle, Airtel, Asian Paints Ltd, Shoppers Stop, ITC Limited, Reliance Communications, Paytm, PayPal, DMart, HDB Financial Services (HDBFS), Jaro Education, Justdial.com, HDFC Bank, SBI General Insurance, Courtyard Marriott, Mahindra Finance, Redington, Colgate Palmolive, Kotak Mahindra, CapitalVia, Axis Bank.

== Awards and achievements ==
The institute received an accreditation of National Board of Accreditation in 2005 and was listed among the top 100 management schools of India in the year of 2015 by OutlookIndia magazine.

== Extra-curricular activities ==
- Reflexions - The Management Fest of IPER
- RISE - The Annual Fest of IPERUG
- WWF - The Market Wrestling
- NSS - The National Service Scheme
- Abhiyan - The Panel Discussion for Management Students
- Sports - Black Panther
- Guest Lectures
- Marketing Club Activity

== See also ==
- Barkatullah University
- Jagran Lakecity University
- Radharaman Institute Of Technology & Science
- Patel College of Science & Technology
- Oriental Institute of Science and Technology
