= Devendra Kumar Jain =

Indian politician

Devendra Kumar Jain (born 1953) is an Indian politician from Madhya Pradesh, India. He is an MLA of Bharatiya Janata Party from Shivpuri Assembly constituency. He won the 2023 Madhya Pradesh Legislative Assembly election. He received a total of 112,324 votes and won with the margin of 43,030 votes. This marks his second term as the MLA of Shivpuri, having previously served in the same capacity in 1993.
