= Gopal Singh Chauhan =

Indian politician

Member of the Madhya Pradesh Legislative Assembly
- Incumbent
- Assumed office 2013
- Preceded by: Rao Rajkumar Singh Mahuan
- Constituency: Chanderi
- In office 2003–2008
- Preceded by: Rao Deshraj Singh Yadav
- Succeeded by: Rao Deshraj Singh Yadav
- Constituency: Mungaoli

Personal details
- Born: 24 January 1960 (age 66) Village Nanakpur, Ashoknagar
- Citizenship: India
- Party: Indian National Congress
- Spouse: Vijaylaxmi Chauhan
- Parent: Chandrabhan Singh Chauhan (father)
- Education: 8th Pass
- Profession: Politician
- As of 27 July, 2018 Source: ["Biography: Gopal Singh Chauhan" (PDF). Madhya Pradesh Legislative Assembly.]

Gopal Singh Chauhan is an Indian politician and a member of the Indian National Congress party.

== Political career ==
In 1983, he started his political journey by becoming the chairman of Chanderi Janpad Panchayat, holding it till 2003.

He became an MLA for the first time in 2003 from Mungaoli. He went on to win a second term in 2013 from Chanderi. Again he achieved victory in third term in 2018 election from Chanderi. After Scindia left Congress party with his 22 supporter MLAs, he renovated party in the entire district along with neighbouring districts also.

== Personal life ==
Kunwar. Gopal Singh Chauhan alias Daggi Raja hails from an illustrious feudal family (Jagir) of North Western Province of Bundelkhand. He is married to Kanwarani. Vijayalaxmi Raje Parmar of Ameeta Jagir, near Orai district UP and has two issues:

Kunwar. Vijay Pratap Singh Chauhan (Manu Raja), educated at Scindia School Gwalior, and pursuing his higher studies from Delhi University. ... Baiji Lal- Karnika Singh, educated at Scindia Kanya Vidhyalaya, Gwalior, pursuing higher studies from Delhi University.

Daggi Raja's mother, hails from the royal family of Madhopur in M.P. A family that stands as a blood relative to Maharaja. Chhatarsaal Singh Bundela of Bundelkhand.

== See also ==
- Madhya Pradesh Legislative Assembly
- 2013 Madhya Pradesh Legislative Assembly election
- 2003 Madhya Pradesh Legislative Assembly election
