= Kirti Kumari =

Indian politician

MLA
- In office 2013–2017
- Succeeded by: Vivek Dhakar
- Constituency: Mandalgarh, Bhilwara

Personal details
- Born: 13 August 1967 Kota, Rajasthan
- Died: 28 August 2017 (aged 50)
- Party: Bharatiya Janata Party

Kirti Kumari (13 August 1967 – 28 August 2017) was a member of the erstwhile Royal Family of Bijolia, daughter of present Rao Saheb Shri Chandraveer Singh ji of Bijolia and Rani Saheb Manohar Kanwar of Auwa (Marwar). She was an alumnus of the Sophia Senior Secondary School, Ajmer & later the Sophia College where she completed her Bachelor of Arts. She worked for the Mayo College Girls School as a House Master in Jamila Singh House. Next she entered politics and was a politician from the Bharatiya Janata Party and a member of the Rajasthan Legislative Assembly representing the Mandalgarh Vidhan Sabha constituency in Bhilwara district, Rajasthan. Kumari died of a swine flu infection on 28 August 2017. She was fifty years old.

== Political career ==
Kumari belonged to the former royal family of Bijolia. She contested her first election in 2003 on the Bharatiya Janata Party ticket from Mandalgarh Vidhan Sabha constituency where she faced Shiv Charan Mathur of the Indian National Congress, a two-term Chief Minister of Rajasthan and six-term member of the Rajasthan Legislative Assembly. Kumari narrowly lost that election by approximately eight hundred votes. In 2008, Kumari faced Pradeep Kumar Singh, losing by nearly one thousand five hundred votes. Kumari won a seat on the Rajasthan Legislative Assembly in 2013, by defeating Indian National Congress candidate Vivek Dhakar, carrying her constituency by a margin of over nineteen thousand votes.

== Death ==
In early August 2017, Kumari fell ill and was treated by a local physician. Her condition did not improve and she was transferred to the district hospital where she was diagnosed with the H1N1 strain of swine influenza. Her condition worsened and she was then shifted to the Sawai Man Singh Hospital in Jaipur where the doctors advised that she be moved to a specialty hospital. Kumari subsequently sought treatment at the Fortis Hospital, where she died on 28 August 2017. Rajasthan chief minister Vasundhara Raje stated, "Her demise is a huge loss for me and for the BJP family".
