= Ram Singh Yadav (politician) =

Indian politician

Ram Singh Yadav (c. 1943–2017) was an Indian politician and Congress MLA from Madhya Pradesh. He was also the Shivpuri district Congress President and died in office from a heart attack on 18 October 2017, aged 74. Known as 'Dadaji' and elected in the 2013 Assembly elections, he was survived by his wife and two children.
