= Mahendra Singh Kalukheda =

Indian politician

- Died: September 2017
- Education: Vikram University

Mahendra Singh Kalukheda was an Indian National Congress politician and former minister. He died in September 2017 after a prolonged illness.

Mahendra Singh Kalukheda was born as a Maratha royal in Malwa region of Kalukheda.

== Political career ==
Kalukheda had begun his political career from student politics. He became MLA in 1972 for the first time from legislative assembly. In 2013, he had become an MLA for the sixth time. He was the chairman of the public account committee of the state assembly. He was also an MP in 1984.

== See also ==
- Madhya Pradesh Legislative Assembly
- 2013 Madhya Pradesh Legislative Assembly election
