= First Indira Gandhi ministry =

List of Council of Ministers in Indira Gandhi's First Government

- 6th ministry of the Republic of India

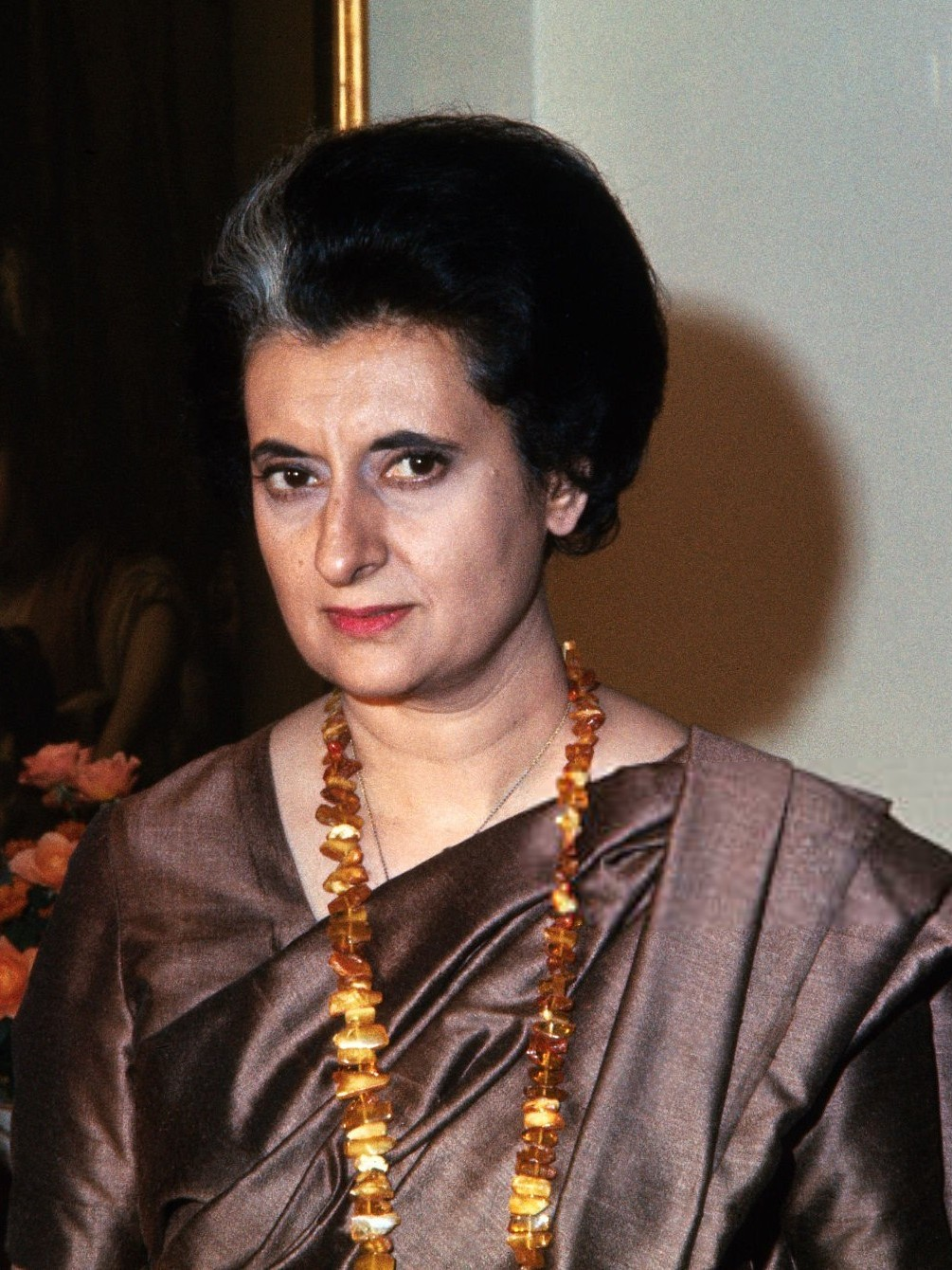
- Date formed: 24 January 1966
- Date dissolved: 13 March 1967

People and organisations
- Head of state: Sarvepalli Radhakrishnan
- Head of government: Indira Gandhi
- Member party: Indian National Congress
- Status in legislature: Majority
- Opposition party: None
- Opposition leader: None

History
- Outgoing election: 1967
- Legislature terms: 6 years (Rajya Sabha); 5 years (Lok Sabha)
- Predecessor: Lal Bahadur Shastri ministry (Note: Second Nanda ministry (interim))
- Successor: Second Indira Gandhi ministry

The First Indira Gandhi ministry was formed on 24 January 1966 under the premiership of Indira Gandhi who was elected as the Prime Minister of India by the Congress Parliamentary Party to succeed Gulzarilal Nanda who was serving as the acting prime minister since 11 January 1966 following the untimely demise of Lal Bahadur Shastri. The cabinet remained in office until the 1967 general election in which Indira Gandhi was re-elected to office.

== Background ==
Prime Minister Lal Bahadur Shastri died suddenly on 11 January 1966 at Tashkent during his visit to Uzbek SSR, just a day after signing the Tashkent Declaration which formally ended the Indo-Pakistani War of 1965. He was succeeded by Home Minister Gulzarilal Nanda as the Acting Prime Minister. Nanda remained the prime minister for thirteen days until the election of Indira Gandhi who served as Minister of Information and Broadcasting in the cabinets of Shastri and Nanda. Indira Gandhi was formally elected as the Prime Minister by the ruling Indian National Congress party. She was thereupon formally sworn in as the nation's third prime minister on 24 January 1966 by President Sarvepalli Radhakrishnan.

== Composition ==
Gandhi's council of ministers included a majority of the ministers from her predecessor's cabinet. Outgoing acting prime minister Gulzarilal Nanda was re-appointed home minister. She retained Defence Minister Yashwantrao Chavan, Education Minister M. C. Chagla, Railways Minister S. K. Patil, Finance Minister Sachindra Chaudhuri, Communications and Parliamentary Minister Satya Narayan Sinha, Agriculture Minister Chidambaram Subramaniam, External Affairs Minister Swaran Singh in their respective portfolios. Other ministers who were retained from the predecessor cabinet included Neelam Sanjiva Reddy, Damodaram Sanjivayya, Manubhai Shah, Mehr Chand Khanna, Raj Bahadur, Surendra Kumar Dey, Sushila Nayyar, Jaisukhlal Hathi, Kotha Raghuramaiah, O. V. Alagesan, Ram Subhag Singh, Bali Ram Bhagat, A. M. Thomas, C. M. Poonacha, Jagannath Rao, C. R. Pattabhiraman, Bibudhendra Mishra, Tribhuvan Narain Singh, Shah Nawaz Khan, Dajisaheb Chavan, Purnendu Sekhar Naskar, B. S. Murthy, Lalit Narayan Mishra, T. S. Soundaram, Bhakt Darshan, Sham Nath, B. C. Bhagawati, Shyam Dhar Mishra.

== Ministers ==
=== Cabinet Ministers ===
Portfolio	Minister	Took office	Left office	Party	Remarks
Prime Minister; Minister of Atomic Energy; And also in-charge of all other important portfolios and policy issues not allocated to any Minister.	Indira Gandhi	24 January 1966	13 March 1967	INC	
Minister of Home Affairs	Gulzarilal Nanda	24 January 1966	9 November 1966	INC	
Minister of Home Affairs	Indira Gandhi	9 November 1966	13 November 1966	INC	
Minister of Home Affairs	Yashwantrao Chavan	13 November 1966	13 March 1967	INC	
Minister of Labour, Employment and Rehabilitation	Jagjivan Ram	24 January 1966	13 March 1967	INC	
Minister of External Affairs	Swaran Singh	24 January 1966	13 November 1966	INC	
Minister of External Affairs	M. C. Chagla	13 November 1966	13 March 1967	INC	
Minister of Railways	S. K. Patil	24 January 1966	13 March 1967	INC	
Minister of Defence	Yashwantrao Chavan	24 January 1966	13 November 1966	INC	
Minister of Defence	Swaran Singh	13 November 1966	13 March 1967	INC	
Minister of Transport and Aviation	Neelam Sanjiva Reddy	24 January 1966	13 March 1967	INC	
Minister of Food, Agriculture, Community Development and Cooperation	Chidambaram Subramaniam	24 January 1966	13 March 1967	INC	
Minister of Finance	Sachindra Chaudhuri	24 January 1966	13 March 1967	INC	
Minister of Parliamentary Affairs and Communications	Satya Narayan Sinha	24 January 1966	13 March 1967	INC	
Minister of Education	M. C. Chagla	24 January 1966	13 November 1966	INC	
Minister of Education	Fakhruddin Ali Ahmed	13 November 1966	13 March 1967	INC	
Minister of Industry	Damodaram Sanjivayya	24 January 1966	13 March 1967	INC	
Minister of Planning	Asoka Mehta	24 January 1966	25 March 1966	INC	Renamed as Planning and Social Welfare.
Minister of Planning and Social Welfare	Asoka Mehta	25 March 1966	13 March 1967	INC	
Minister of Commerce	Manubhai Shah	24 January 1966	13 March 1967	INC	
Minister of Law	Gopal Swarup Pathak	24 January 1966	13 March 1967	INC	
Minister of Irrigation and Power	Fakhruddin Ali Ahmed	29 January 1966	13 November 1966	INC	
Minister of Irrigation and Power	Kanuri Lakshmana Rao	13 November 1966	13 March 1967	INC	Minister of State was responsible.

=== Ministers of State ===
Portfolio	Minister	Took office	Left office	Party	Remarks
Minister of Works, Housing and Urban Development	Mehr Chand Khanna	24 January 1966	13 March 1967	INC	
Minister of Information and Broadcasting	Raj Bahadur	24 January 1966	13 March 1967	INC	
Minister of Mines and Metals	Surendra Kumar Dey	24 January 1966	13 March 1967	INC	
Minister of Health and Family Planning	Sushila Nayyar	24 January 1966	13 March 1967	INC	
Minister of State in the Ministry of Home Affairs	Jaisukhlal Hathi	24 January 1966	13 November 1966	INC	
Minister of Defence Supplies in the Ministry of Defence	Jaisukhlal Hathi	24 January 1966	13 November 1966	INC	
Minister of Technical Development and Supply	Kotha Raghuramaiah	24 January 1966	25 March 1966	INC	Renamed as Supply, Technical Development and Materials Planning.
Minister of Supply, Technical Development and Materials Planning	Kotha Raghuramaiah	25 March 1966	13 March 1967	INC	
Minister of Social Welfare	Kotha Raghuramaiah	28 January 1966	25 March 1966	INC	Merged with Ministry of Planning.
Minister of Petroleum and Chemicals	O. V. Alagesan	24 January 1966	13 March 1967	INC	
Minister of State in the Ministry of Railways	Ram Subhag Singh	24 January 1966	13 March 1967	INC	
Minister of State in the Ministry of Irrigation and Power	Kanuri Lakshmana Rao	24 January 1966	13 March 1967	INC	
Minister of State in the Ministry of Finance	Bali Ram Bhagat	24 January 1966	13 March 1967	INC	
Minister of State in the Ministry of Defence	A. M. Thomas	24 January 1966	31 January 1966	INC	
Minister of State in the Ministry of Defence	Jaisukhlal Hathi	13 November 1966	13 March 1967	INC	
Minister of State in the Ministry of Defence (Department of Defence Production)	A. M. Thomas	31 January 1966	13 March 1967	INC	
Minister of State in the Ministry of Transport and Aviation	C. M. Poonacha	24 January 1966	13 March 1967	INC	
Minister of State in the Ministry of Law	C. R. Pattabhiraman	24 January 1966	13 March 1967	INC	
Minister of State in the Ministry of Labour, Employment and Rehabilitation	Jagannath Rao	24 January 1966	14 February 1966	INC	
Minister of State in the Ministry of Home Affairs	Dinesh Singh	24 January 1966	13 March 1967	INC	
Minister of State in the Ministry of Food, Agriculture, Community Development and Cooperation	Panampilly Govinda Menon	24 January 1966	13 March 1967	INC	
Minister of State in the Ministry of Industry	Bibudhendra Mishra	24 January 1966	13 March 1967	INC	
Minister of Iron and Steel	Tribhuvan Narain Singh	29 January 1966	13 March 1967	INC	
Minister of State in the Department of Parliamentary Affairs; Minister of State in the Department of Communications	Jagannath Rao	14 February 1966	13 March 1967	INC	

=== Deputy Ministers ===
Portfolio	Minister	Took office	Left office	Party
Deputy Minister in the Ministry of Labour, Employment and Rehabilitation	Shah Nawaz Khan	24 January 1966	13 March 1967	INC
Deputy Minister in the Ministry of Labour, Employment and Rehabilitation	Dajisaheb Chavan	14 February 1966	13 March 1967	INC
Deputy Minister in the Ministry of Home Affairs	Purnendu Sekhar Naskar	24 January 1966	13 March 1967	INC
Deputy Minister in the Ministry of Home Affairs	Vidya Charan Shukla	14 February 1966	13 March 1967	INC
Deputy Minister in the Ministry of Health and Family Planning	B. S. Murthy	24 January 1966	13 March 1967	INC
Deputy Minister in the Ministry of Irrigation and Power	Lalit Narayan Mishra	24 January 1966	13 March 1967	INC
Deputy Minister in the Ministry of Education	T. S. Soundaram	24 January 1966	13 March 1967	INC
Deputy Minister in the Ministry of Education	Bhakt Darshan	24 January 1966	13 March 1967	INC
Deputy Minister in the Ministry of Planning	Dajisaheb Chavan	24 January 1966	14 February 1966	INC
Deputy Minister in the Department of Social Welfare	Maragatham Chandrasekar	24 January 1966	13 March 1967	INC
Deputy Minister in the Ministry of Railways	Sham Nath	24 January 1966	13 March 1967	INC
Deputy Minister in the Ministry of Works, Housing and Urban Development	Bijoy Chandra Bhagavati	24 January 1966	13 March 1967	INC
Deputy Minister in the Ministry of Defence	Shyam Dhar Mishra	24 January 1966	14 February 1966	INC
Deputy Minister in the Ministry of Iron and Steel	Prakash Chandra Sethi	24 January 1966	13 March 1967	INC
Deputy Minister in the Ministry of Food, Agriculture, Community Development and Cooperation	Annasaheb Shinde	24 January 1966	13 March 1967	INC
Deputy Minister in the Ministry of Food, Agriculture, Community Development and Cooperation	Shyam Dhar Mishra	14 February 1966	13 March 1967	INC
Deputy Minister in the Department of Parliamentary Affairs; Deputy Minister in the Department of Communications	Vidya Charan Shukla	24 January 1966	14 February 1966	INC
Deputy Minister in the Ministry of Petroleum and Chemicals	Sardar Iqbal Singh	24 January 1966	13 March 1967	INC
Deputy Minister in the Ministry of Information and Broadcasting	Nandini Satpathy	29 January 1966	13 March 1967	INC
Deputy Minister in the Ministry of Commerce	Mohammad Shafi Qureshi	29 January 1966	13 March 1967	INC
Deputy Minister in the Ministry of Transport and Aviation	Jahanara Jaipal Singh	15 February 1966	13 March 1967	INC
Deputy Minister in the Ministry of Mines and Metals	Syed Ahmad Mehdi	15 February 1966	13 March 1967	INC

=== Parliamentary Secretaries ===
Portfolio	Minister	Took office	Left office	Party
Parliamentary Secretary in the Department of Atomic Energy	Sarojini Mahishi	15 February 1966	13 March 1967	INC
Parliamentary Secretary in the Department of Communications	Bhanu Prakash Singh	15 February 1966	13 March 1967	INC
Parliamentary Secretary in the Ministry of External Affairs	S. C. Jamir	15 February 1966	13 March 1967	INC
Parliamentary Secretary in the Ministry of Home Affairs	Daying Ering	15 February 1966	13 March 1967	INC

== Trivia ==
- Two of the cabinet ministers, viz. Fakhruddin Ali Ahmed and Neelam Sanjiva Reddy would later serve as the 5th and 6th President of India respectively. Reddy would also serve as the Speaker of the Lok Sabha on two separate occasions.
- Minister of Law Gopal Swarup Pathak would later be elected as the 4th Vice President of India in 1969.
- Chidambaram Subramaniam, Satya Narayan Sinha, Gopal Swarup Pathak, Jaisukhlal Hathi, Bali Ram Bhagat, C. M. Poonacha, Tribhuvan Narain Singh, Mohammad Shafi Qureshi, Bhanu Prakash Singh, S. C. Jamir would later be appointed as governors of several states.
- Tribhuvan Narain Singh would later serve as Chief Minister of Uttar Pradesh, Prakash Chandra Sethi as Chief Minister of Madhya Pradesh and S. C. Jamir as Chief Minister of Nagaland.
