= Minister of Road Transport and Highways =

Cabinet-level public office in the Government of India

- Saṛak Parivahan Aur Rajmārg Mantrī
- Emblem of the Ministry of Road Transport and Highways

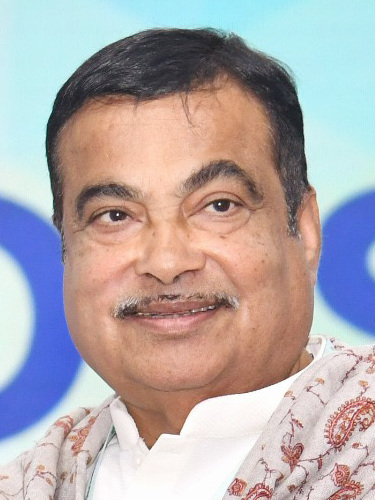
- Incumbent; Nitin Gadkari since 26 May 2014
- Ministry of Road Transport and Highways
- Member of: Cabinet of India
- Reports to: President of India; Prime Minister of India; Parliament of India
- Appointer: President of India on the recommendation of the Prime Minister of India
- Formation: 1947 (as Ministry of Transport); 7 November 2000 (current form)
- First holder: John Mathai (as Minister of Transport); B. C. Khanduri (as Minister of Road Transport and Highways)

The minister of road transport and highways is the head of the Ministry of Road Transport and Highways and a senior member of the union council of ministers of the Government of India. The portfolio is usually held by a minister with cabinet rank who is a senior member of the council of ministers and is often assisted by one or two junior ministers or the Ministers of State.

The current minister is Nitin Gadkari who has been serving in office since 26 May 2014 and is currently assisted by V. K. Singh as the Minister of State for Road Transport and Highways.

Two past presidents- Neelam Sanjiva Reddy and Pranab Mukherjee served as ministers in the ministry. Reddy was Cabinet Minister of Transport and Civil Aviation from 1966 till 1967 while Mukherjee was Deputy Minister of Shipping and Transport in 1974. One past prime minister, Lal Bahadur Shastri served as Minister of Transport and Railways from 1952 till 1956 and as Minister of Transport and Communications from 1957 till 1958. Five prime ministers - Morarji Desai (in 1977), Rajiv Gandhi (in 1986), Chandra Shekhar (in 1991), Atal Bihari Vajpayee (in 1996 and in 2000) and Manmohan Singh (in 2013) held the charge of the ministry during their premierships. The current minister Nitin Gadkari holds the record of being the longest-serving minister in the ministry.

== Titles of office ==
The ministry has been subjected to various changes since its inception. The ministers have been known by the following titles from time to time:

- 1947–1948: Minister of Transport
- 1948–1957: Minister of Transport and Railways
- 1957–1963: Minister of Transport and Communications
- 1963–1966: Minister of Transport
- 1966–1967: Minister of Transport and Aviation
- 1967–1985: Minister of Shipping and Transport
- 1985–1986: Minister of Transport
- 1986–2000: Minister of Surface Transport
- 2000–2004: Minister of Road Transport and Highways
- 2004–2009: Minister of Shipping, Road Transport and Highways
- 2009–present: Minister of Road Transport and Highways

== History of office ==
The "Ministry of Transport" was created upon the nation's independence on 15 August 1947 with John Mathai being appointed as the inaugural minister. On 22 September 1948, the ministry was renamed as "Ministry of Transport and Railways" and N. Gopalaswamy Ayyangar was appointed as the minister on the same day. With the formation of the Third Nehru ministry on 17 April 1957, the Ministry of Transport and Railways was bifurcated into the "Ministry of Railways" and the "Ministry of Transport and Communications" with the merger of the Ministry of Communications with the transport ministry.

On 1 September 1963, the Department of Communications was separated from the ministry and the ministry was renamed as "Ministry of Transport". Upon Indira Gandhi's appointment as the Prime Minister on 24 January 1966, the Ministry of Civil Aviation was merged with the Ministry of Transport to form the "Ministry of Transport and Civil Aviation" which was short-lived and the Department of Civil Aviation was separated and merged to form the Ministry of Tourism and Civil Aviation. Meanwhile, the Department of Transport was renamed as "Ministry of Shipping and Transport".

On 25 September 1985, the Ministry of Railways, the Ministry of Shipping and Transport and the Department of Civil Aviation were merged to form the "Ministry of Transport" with constituent departments of Railways, Surface Transport and Civil Aviation. Bansi Lal was appointed as the minister of the bulk-ministry and was assisted by three ministers of state, Madhavrao Scindia for Railways, Rajesh Pilot for Surface Transport and Jagdish Tytler for Civil Aviation. Lal resigned on 4 June 1986 and was succeeded by Mohsina Kidwai. In a reshuffle of the union cabinet on 22 October 1986, the Ministry of Transport was bifurcated into the Ministry of Railways, the Ministry of Surface Transport and the Ministry of Civil Aviation. Three ministers of state of the constituent departments of the erstwhile transport ministry - Madhavrao Scindia, Rajesh Pilot, and Jagdish Tytler were appointed as the ministers of state with independent charge of the newly created three independent ministries.

The Ministry of Surface Transport existed from 1986 until 7 November 2000 when the ministry bifurcated into two separate ministries, viz. the "Ministry of Road Transport and Highways" and the "Ministry of Shipping". On 2 October 2004, the two ministries were re-united as the "Ministry of Shipping, Road Transport and Highways" and were re-bifurcated in May 2009 and has since then existed as two independent ministries. Nitin Gadkari served as the minister of both ministries between 2014 till 2019 and since 2019 has been heading the Ministry of Road Transport and Highways. The Ministry of Shipping was renamed as the "Ministry of Ports, Shipping and Waterways" on 10 November 2020.

== Cabinet ministers ==
- Note: MoS, I/C – Minister of State (Independent Charge)

Portrait	Minister (Birth-Death) Constituency	Term of office			Political party	Ministry
Portrait	Minister (Birth-Death) Constituency	From	To	Period	Political party	Ministry
=== Minister of Transport (1947–1948) ===
	John Mathai (1886–1959)	15 August 1947	22 September 1948	1 year, 38 days	Indian National Congress	Nehru I
=== Minister of Transport and Railways (1948–1957) ===
	N. Gopalaswamy Ayyangar (1882–1953); MP for Madras (Interim)	22 September 1948	13 May 1952	3 years, 234 days	Indian National Congress	Nehru I
	Lal Bahadur Shastri (1904–1966); Rajya Sabha MP for Uttar Pradesh	13 May 1952	7 December 1956	4 years, 208 days	Indian National Congress	Nehru II
	Jagjivan Ram (1908–1986); MP for Shahabad South	7 December 1956	17 April 1957	131 days	Indian National Congress	Nehru II
=== Minister of Transport and Communications (1957–1963) ===
	Lal Bahadur Shastri (1904–1966); MP for Allahabad	17 April 1957	28 March 1958	345 days	Indian National Congress	Nehru III
	S. K. Patil (1898–1981); MP for Mumbai South	29 March 1958	24 August 1959	1 year, 148 days	Indian National Congress	Nehru III
	Jawaharlal Nehru (1889–1964); MP for Phulpur (Prime Minister)	24 August 1959	2 September 1959	9 days	Indian National Congress	Nehru III
	P. Subbarayan (1889–1962); MP for Tiruchengode	2 September 1959	10 April 1962	2 years, 220 days	Indian National Congress	Nehru III
	Jagjivan Ram (1908–1986); MP for Sasaram	10 April 1962	31 August 1963	1 year, 143 days	Indian National Congress	Nehru IV
	Raj Bahadur (1912–1990); MP for Bharatpur; Minister of Shipping	10 April 1962	1 September 1963	1 year, 144 days	Indian National Congress	Nehru IV
=== Minister of Transport (1963–1966) ===
	Raj Bahadur (1912–1990); MP for Bharatpur (MoS until 1 September 1963)	1 September 1963	10 April 1964	2 years, 145 days	Indian National Congress	Nehru IV
	Raj Bahadur (1912–1990); MP for Bharatpur (MoS until 1 September 1963)	27 May 1964	9 June 1964	2 years, 145 days	Indian National Congress	Nanda I
	Raj Bahadur (1912–1990); MP for Bharatpur (MoS until 1 September 1963)	9 June 1964	11 January 1966	2 years, 145 days	Indian National Congress	Shastri
	Raj Bahadur (1912–1990); MP for Bharatpur (MoS until 1 September 1963)	11 January 1966	24 January 1966	2 years, 145 days	Indian National Congress	Nanda II
=== Minister of Transport and Aviation (1966–1967) ===
	Neelam Sanjiva Reddy (1913–1996); Rajya Sabha MP for Andhra Pradesh	24 January 1966	13 March 1967	1 year, 48 days	Indian National Congress	Indira I
=== Minister of Shipping and Transport (1967–1985) ===
	V. K. R. V. Rao (1908–1991); MP for Bellary	13 March 1967	14 February 1969	1 year, 338 days	Indian National Congress	Indira II
	Kotha Raghuramaiah (1912–1979); MP for Guntur	14 February 1969	18 March 1971	2 years, 32 days	Indian National Congress (R)	Indira II
	Raj Bahadur (1912–1990); MP for Bharatpur	18 March 1971	8 November 1973	2 years, 235 days	Indian National Congress (R)	Indira III
	Kamalapati Tripathi (1905–1990); Rajya Sabha MP for Uttar Pradesh	8 November 1973	10 February 1975	1 year, 94 days	Indian National Congress (R)	Indira III
	Uma Shankar Dikshit (1901–1991); Rajya Sabha MP for Uttar Pradesh	10 February 1975	1 December 1975	294 days	Indian National Congress (R)	Indira III
	Gurdial Singh Dhillon (1915–1992); MP for Tarn Taran	1 December 1975	24 March 1977	1 year, 113 days	Indian National Congress (R)	Indira III
	Morarji Desai (1896–1995); MP for Surat (Prime Minister)	24 March 1977	7 June 1977	75 days	Janata Party	Desai
	Jagjivan Ram (1908–1986); MP for Sasaram (Deputy Prime Minister)	7 June 1977	17 June 1977	10 days	Janata Party	Desai
	Morarji Desai (1896–1995); MP for Surat (Prime Minister)	17 June 1977	14 August 1977	58 days	Janata Party	Desai
	Chand Ram (1923–2015); MP for Sirsa (MoS, I/C)	14 August 1977	28 July 1979	1 year, 348 days	Janata Party	Desai
	Janeshwar Mishra (1933–2010); MP for Allahabad (MoS, I/C)	30 July 1979	14 January 1980	168 days	Janata Party (Secular)	Charan
	Anant Sharma (1919–1988); Rajya Sabha MP for Bihar	14 January 1980	19 October 1980	279 days	Indian National Congress (I)	Indira IV
	Veerendra Patil (1924–1997); MP for Bagalkot	19 October 1980	2 September 1982	1 year, 318 days	Indian National Congress (I)	Indira IV
	C. M. Stephen (1918–1984); MP for Gulbarga	2 September 1982	2 February 1983	153 days	Indian National Congress (I)	Indira IV
	Kotla Vijaya Bhaskara Reddy (1920–2001); MP for Kurnool	2 February 1983	7 September 1984	1 year, 218 days	Indian National Congress (I)	Indira IV
	Veerendra Patil (1924–1997); MP for Bagalkot	7 September 1984	31 October 1984	54 days	Indian National Congress (I)	Indira IV
	Veerendra Patil (1924–1997); MP for Bagalkot	4 November 1984	31 December 1984	57 days	Indian National Congress (I)	Rajiv I
	Ziaur Rahman Ansari (1925–1992); MP for Unnao (MoS, I/C)	31 December 1984	25 September 1985	268 days	Indian National Congress (I)	Rajiv II
=== Minister of Transport (1985–1986) ===
	Bansi Lal (1927–2006); MP for Bhiwani	25 September 1985	4 June 1986	252 days	Indian National Congress (I)	Rajiv II
	Rajiv Gandhi (1944–1991); MP for Amethi (Prime Minister)	4 June 1986	24 June 1986	20 days	Indian National Congress (I)	Rajiv II
	Mohsina Kidwai (1932–2026); MP for Meerut	24 June 1986	22 October 1986	120 days	Indian National Congress (I)	Rajiv II
=== Minister of Surface Transport (1986–2000) ===
	Rajesh Pilot (1945–2000); MP for Dausa (MoS, I/C)	22 October 1986	2 December 1989	3 years, 41 days	Indian National Congress (I)	Rajiv II
	K. P. Unnikrishnan (1936–2026); MP for Vatakara	6 December 1989	10 November 1990	339 days	Janata Dal (NF)	Vishwanath
	Manubhai Kotadia (1936–2003); MP for Amreli	21 November 1990	26 April 1991	156 days	Samajwadi Janata Party (Rashtriya) (NF)	Chandra Shekhar
	Chandra Shekhar (1927–2007); MP for Ballia (Prime Minister)	26 April 1991	21 June 1991	56 days	Samajwadi Janata Party (Rashtriya) (NF)	Chandra Shekhar
	Jagdish Tytler (born 1944); MP for Delhi Sadar (MoS, I/C)	21 June 1991	15 September 1995	4 years, 86 days	Indian National Congress (I)	Rao
	M. Rajasekara Murthy (1922–2010); MP for Mysore (MoS, I/C)	15 September 1995	16 May 1996	244 days	Indian National Congress (I)	Rao
	Atal Bihari Vajpayee (1924–2018); MP for Lucknow (Prime Minister)	16 May 1996	1 June 1996	16 days	Bharatiya Janata Party	Vajpayee I
	T. G. Venkatraman (1931–2013); MP for Tindivanam	1 June 1996	21 April 1997	324 days	Dravida Munnetra Kazhagam (UF)	Deve Gowda
	T. G. Venkatraman (1931–2013); MP for Tindivanam	21 April 1997	19 March 1998	324 days	Dravida Munnetra Kazhagam (UF)	Gujral
	Sedapatti R. Muthiah (1945–2022); MP for Periyakulam	19 March 1998	8 April 1998	20 days	All India Anna Dravida Munnetra Kazhagam (NDA)	Vajpayee II
	M. Thambidurai (born 1947); MP for Karur	8 April 1998	8 April 1999	1 year	All India Anna Dravida Munnetra Kazhagam (NDA)	Vajpayee II
	Nitish Kumar (born 1951); MP for Barh	8 April 1999	5 August 1999	119 days	Samata Party (NDA)	Vajpayee II
	Jaswant Singh (1938–2020); Rajya Sabha MP for Rajasthan	5 August 1999	13 October 1999	69 days	Bharatiya Janata Party (NDA)	Vajpayee II
	Nitish Kumar (born 1951); MP for Barh	13 October 1999	22 November 1999	40 days	Samata Party (NDA)	Vajpayee III
	Rajnath Singh (born 1951); Rajya Sabha MP for Uttar Pradesh	22 November 1999	25 October 2000	338 days	Bharatiya Janata Party (NDA)	Vajpayee III
	Atal Bihari Vajpayee (1924–2018); MP for Lucknow (Prime Minister)	25 October 2000	7 November 2000	13 days	Bharatiya Janata Party (NDA)	Vajpayee III
=== Minister of Road Transport and Highways (2000–2004) ===
	Major General; B. C. Khanduri (1934–2026); MP for Garhwal (MoS, I/C until 24 May 2003)	7 November 2000	22 May 2004	3 years, 197 days	Bharatiya Janata Party (NDA)	Vajpayee III
	T. R. Baalu (born 1941); MP for Chennai South	23 May 2004	2 October 2004	132 days	Dravida Munnetra Kazhagam (UPA)	Manmohan I
=== Minister of Shipping, Road Transport and Highways (2004–2009) ===
	T. R. Baalu (born 1941); MP for Chennai South	2 October 2004	22 May 2009	4 years, 232 days	Dravida Munnetra Kazhagam (UPA)	Manmohan I
=== Minister of Road Transport and Highways (2009–present) ===
	Kamal Nath (born 1946); MP for Chhindwara	28 May 2009	19 January 2011	1 year, 235 days	Indian National Congress (UPA)	Manmohan II
	C. P. Joshi (born 1950); MP for Bhilwara	19 January 2011	15 June 2013	2 years, 147 days	Indian National Congress (UPA)	Manmohan II
	Manmohan Singh (1932–2024); Rajya Sabha MP for Assam (Prime Minister)	15 June 2013	17 June 2013	2 days	Indian National Congress (UPA)	Manmohan II
	Oscar Fernandes (1941–2021); Rajya Sabha MP for Karnataka	17 June 2013	26 May 2014	343 days	Indian National Congress (UPA)	Manmohan II
	Nitin Gadkari (born 1957); MP for Nagpur	26 May 2014	Incumbent	12 years, 104 days	Bharatiya Janata Party (NDA)	Modi I
	Nitin Gadkari (born 1957); MP for Nagpur	26 May 2014	Incumbent	12 years, 104 days	Bharatiya Janata Party (NDA)	Modi II
	Nitin Gadkari (born 1957); MP for Nagpur	26 May 2014	Incumbent	12 years, 104 days	Bharatiya Janata Party (NDA)	Modi III

== Ministers of State ==
No.	Portrait	Minister (Birth-Death) Constituency	Term of office			Political party	Ministry	Prime Minister
No.	Portrait	Minister (Birth-Death) Constituency	From	To	Period	Political party	Ministry	Prime Minister
Minister of State for Transport and Railways
1		K. Santhanam (1895–1980); MP for Madras (Constituent Assembly)	1 October 1948	17 April 1952	3 years, 199 days	Indian National Congress	Nehru I	Jawaharlal Nehru
Minister of State for Transport and Communications
2		Humayun Kabir (1906–1969); Rajya Sabha MP for West Bengal	17 April 1957	10 April 1958	358 days	Indian National Congress	Nehru III	Jawaharlal Nehru
3		Raj Bahadur (1912–1990); MP for Bharatpur	17 April 1957	10 April 1962	4 years, 358 days	Indian National Congress	Nehru III	Jawaharlal Nehru
Minister of State for Transport and Civil Aviation
4		C. M. Poonacha (1910–1990); Rajya Sabha MP for Mysore	24 January 1966	13 March 1967	1 year, 48 days	Indian National Congress	Indira I	Indira Gandhi
Minister of State for Shipping and Transport
5		Om Mehta (1927–1995); Rajya Sabha MP for Jammu and Kashmir	2 May 1971	5 February 1973	1 year, 279 days	Indian National Congress (R)	Indira III	Indira Gandhi
6		Mansinhji Bhasaheb Rana; MP for Broach	5 February 1973	11 January 1974	340 days	Indian National Congress (R)	Indira III	Indira Gandhi
7		H. M. Trivedi; Rajya Sabha MP for Gujarat	17 October 1974	24 March 1977	2 years, 158 days	Indian National Congress (R)	Indira III	Indira Gandhi
8		Buta Singh (1934–2021); MP for Ropar	8 June 1980	15 January 1982	1 year, 221 days	Indian National Congress (I)	Indira IV	Indira Gandhi
9		Sitaram Kesri (1919–2000); Rajya Sabha MP for Bihar	15 January 1982	29 January 1983	1 year, 14 days	Indian National Congress (I)	Indira IV	Indira Gandhi
10		Ziaur Rahman Ansari (1925–1992); MP for Unnao	29 January 1983	31 October 1984	54 days	Indian National Congress (I)	Indira IV	Indira Gandhi
10		Ziaur Rahman Ansari (1925–1992); MP for Unnao	4 November 1984	31 December 1984	57 days	Indian National Congress (I)	Rajiv I	Rajiv Gandhi
Minister of State for Transport
Minister of State in the Department of Railways			25 September 1985	22 October 1986	1 year, 27 days	Indian National Congress	Rajiv II	Rajiv Gandhi
11A		Madhavrao Scindia (1945–2001); MP for Gwalior	25 September 1985	22 October 1986	1 year, 27 days	Indian National Congress	Rajiv II	Rajiv Gandhi
Minister of State in the Department of Surface Transport			25 September 1985	22 October 1986	1 year, 27 days	Indian National Congress	Rajiv II	Rajiv Gandhi
11B		Rajesh Pilot (1945–2000); MP for Dausa	25 September 1985	22 October 1986	1 year, 27 days	Indian National Congress	Rajiv II	Rajiv Gandhi
Minister of State in the Department of Civil Aviation			25 September 1985	22 October 1986	1 year, 27 days	Indian National Congress	Rajiv II	Rajiv Gandhi
11C		Jagdish Tytler (born 1944); MP for Delhi Sadar	25 September 1985	22 October 1986	1 year, 27 days	Indian National Congress	Rajiv II	Rajiv Gandhi
Minister of State for Surface Transport
12		Debendra Pradhan (1941–2025); MP for Deogarh	19 March 1998	13 October 1999	2 years, 69 days	Bharatiya Janata Party	Vajpayee II	Atal Bihari Vajpayee
12		Debendra Pradhan (1941–2025); MP for Deogarh	13 October 1999	27 May 2000	2 years, 69 days	Bharatiya Janata Party	Vajpayee III	Atal Bihari Vajpayee
13		Hukmdev Narayan Yadav (born 1939); MP for Madhubani	27 May 2000	2 November 2001	1 year, 159 days	Bharatiya Janata Party	Vajpayee III	Atal Bihari Vajpayee
Minister of State for Road Transport and Highways
14		Shripad Naik (born 1952); MP for Panaji	24 May 2003	8 September 2003	107 days	Bharatiya Janata Party	Vajpayee III	Atal Bihari Vajpayee
15		Pon Radhakrishnan (born 1952); MP for Kanniyakumari	8 September 2003	22 May 2004	257 days	Bharatiya Janata Party	Vajpayee III	Atal Bihari Vajpayee
16		K. H. Muniyappa (born 1948); MP for Kolar	23 May 2004	22 May 2009	4 years, 364 days	Indian National Congress	Manmohan I	Manmohan Singh
17		Mahadeo Singh Khandela (born 1943); MP for Sikar	28 May 2009	19 January 2011	1 year, 236 days	Indian National Congress	Manmohan II	Manmohan Singh
18		R. P. N. Singh (born 1964); MP for Kushi Nagar	28 May 2009	19 January 2011	1 year, 236 days	Indian National Congress	Manmohan II	Manmohan Singh
19		Jitin Prasada (born 1973); MP for Dhaurahra	19 January 2011	28 October 2012	1 year, 283 days	Indian National Congress	Manmohan II	Manmohan Singh
20		Tushar Amarsinh Chaudhary (born 1965); MP for Bardoli	19 January 2011	26 May 2014	3 years, 127 days	Indian National Congress	Manmohan II	Manmohan Singh
21		Sarve Satyanarayana (born 1954); MP for Malkajgiri	28 October 2012	26 May 2014	1 year, 149 days	Indian National Congress	Manmohan II	Manmohan Singh
22		Krishan Pal Gurjar (born 1957); MP for Faridabad	27 May 2014	9 November 2014	167 days	Bharatiya Janata Party	Modi I	Narendra Modi
(15)		Pon Radhakrishnan (born 1952); MP for Kanniyakumari	9 November 2014	3 September 2017	2 years, 298 days	Bharatiya Janata Party	Modi I	Narendra Modi
25		Mansukh Mandaviya (born 1972); Rajya Sabha MP for Gujarat	5 July 2016	30 May 2019	2 years, 329 days	Bharatiya Janata Party	Modi I	Narendra Modi
26		General; V. K. Singh (Retd.); PVSM AVSM YSM ADC (born 1950); MP for Ghaziabad	31 May 2019	9 June 2024	5 years, 4 days	Bharatiya Janata Party	Modi II	Narendra Modi
27		Ajay Tamta (born 1972); MP for Almora	10 June 2024	Incumbent	2 years, 90 days	Bharatiya Janata Party	Modi III	Narendra Modi
28		Harsh Malhotra; MP for East Delhi	10 June 2024	Incumbent	2 years, 90 days	Bharatiya Janata Party	Modi III	Narendra Modi

== Deputy Ministers ==
No.	Portrait	Minister (Birth-Death) Constituency	Term of office			Political party	Ministry	Prime Minister
No.	Portrait	Minister (Birth-Death) Constituency	From	To	Period	Political party	Ministry	Prime Minister
Deputy Minister of Transport and Communications
1		Mohiuddin Ahmed (1898–?); MP for Secunderabad (Civil Aviation)	2 April 1958	10 April 1962	4 years, 8 days	Indian National Congress	Nehru III	Jawaharlal Nehru
(1)		Mohiuddin Ahmed (1898–?); MP for Secunderabad	16 April 1962	1 September 1963	1 year, 138 days	Indian National Congress	Nehru IV	Jawaharlal Nehru
2		Bijoy Chandra Bhagavati (1905–1997); MP for Tezpur	8 May 1962	1 September 1963	1 year, 116 days	Indian National Congress	Nehru IV	Jawaharlal Nehru
Deputy Minister of Transport
(1)		Mohiuddin Ahmed (1898–?); MP for Secunderabad	1 September 1963	27 May 1964	2 years, 126 days	Indian National Congress	Nehru IV	Jawaharlal Nehru
(1)		Mohiuddin Ahmed (1898–?); MP for Secunderabad	27 May 1964	9 June 1964	2 years, 126 days	Indian National Congress	Nanda I	Gulzarilal Nanda
(1)		Mohiuddin Ahmed (1898–?); MP for Secunderabad	15 June 1964	5 January 1966	2 years, 126 days	Indian National Congress	Shastri	Lal Bahadur Shastri
Deputy Minister of Transport and Civil Aviation
3		Jahanara Jaipal Singh (1923–2004); Rajya Sabha MP for Bihar	15 February 1966	13 March 1967	1 year, 26 days	Indian National Congress	Indira I	Indira Gandhi
Deputy Minister of Shipping and Transport
4		Bhakt Darshan (1912–1991); MP for Garhwal	18 March 1967	18 February 1969	1 year, 337 days	Indian National Congress	Indira II	Indira Gandhi
5		Sardar Iqbal Singh (1923–1988); MP for Fazilka	14 February 1969	18 March 1971	2 years, 32 days	Indian National Congress (R)	Indira II	Indira Gandhi
6		Pranab Mukherjee (1935–2020); Rajya Sabha MP for West Bengal	11 January 1974	10 October 1974	272 days	Indian National Congress (R)	Indira II	Indira Gandhi
7		Chaudhary Dalbir Singh (1926–1987); MP for Sirsa	1 December 1975	24 March 1977	1 year, 113 days	Indian National Congress (R)	Indira II	Indira Gandhi
Deputy Minister of Surface Transport
8		P. Namgyal (1937–2020); MP for Ladakh	15 February 1988	4 July 1989	1 year, 139 days	Indian National Congress (I)	Rajiv II	Rajiv Gandhi
Position not in use since 4 July 1989
