= TTK Services =

- Type: Private
- Industry: Conglomerate
- Founded: 2000
- Headquarters: Bangalore, India
- Area served: Worldwide
- Key people: Sunder P (CEO), Parasuram Prabhu (Director)
- Products: Virtual assistant services Real estate
- Website: www.ttkservices.com

TTK Services Pvt Ltd, is an Indian business conglomerate with a presence across the world, In different segments of industry including virtual assistant services and Real estate services, headquartered in Bangalore, Karnataka. TTK Services Pvt Ltd is a company of the TTK Group; The TTK Group was founded in 1928 as an indenting agency by Mr. T.T. Krishnamachari. The Group also has other subsidiaries like TTK Healthcare Limited, TTK Protective Devices Limited, Cigna TTK Limited and Prestige Smart Kitchen.

== History ==
=== Early formative years ===
The company's YourManInIndia service was the first to provide a range of concierge services that enabled Indians living overseas to get things done in India, virtually. In that, they even handled parental care and other errands, back home on their behalf. One such Indian expat in NY, Mr Misha went on to share his experiences with his friend Mr AJ Jacobs (AJ), the editor-at-large of the popular men's magazine Esquire.

=== 2000–2007 ===
YourManInIndia-logo

AJ Jacobs, at that time inspired by Thomas Friedman’s ‘The World Is Flat’ wondered why the benefits of outsourcing should be limited to only the Fortune 500s, why not to an individual like him. So he set upon to experiment and approached YourManInIndia in May 2005 with a request to virtually handle his personal life. While the bizarre request did seem to sound like a joke, the company nevertheless went ahead with the experiment. He outsourced his personal life by sending across things he wanted to do in NY to YourManInIndia. AJ went to write a humorous article My Outsourced Life in the Esquire which captured people’s imagination and the attention of the international press. The experiment gained popularity and was featured on ABC’s Good Morning America, NPR, WSJ, NYT and other international media. Sensing an opportunity, the company formed a separate division for virtual assistant services and christened it as ‘GetFriday.' The service was again featured as YourManInIndia (YMII) in Tim Ferriss’s New York Times best-selling book ‘The Four Hour Work Week’ published in 2007.

=== 2011 – present ===
In November 2011, TTK Services expanded its services to real estate and launched HomeShikari, a real estate portal. It currently offers property related services across six major Indian cities. HomeShikari operated as a property-listing marketplace for residential sales and rentals. In October 2013, it was in discussions with Indian venture-capital investors to raise up to ₹30 crore (approximately US$5 million) to support its planned expansion to additional cities.

In August 2005, TTK Services launched GetFriday, a virtual-assistance service for individuals and small businesses. The service was developed under chief executive Sunder Prakasham. In September 2007, GetFriday had about 700 customers, compared with 200 in June 2007, and TTK Services had increased its workforce from 40 to 120 employees during the preceding six weeks.

== See also ==
- TTK Group
- TTK Prestige
