= Charan Singh ministry =

Council of Ministers headed by Chaudhary Charan Singh

Chaudhary Charan Singh ministry
- 10th ministry of the Republic of India

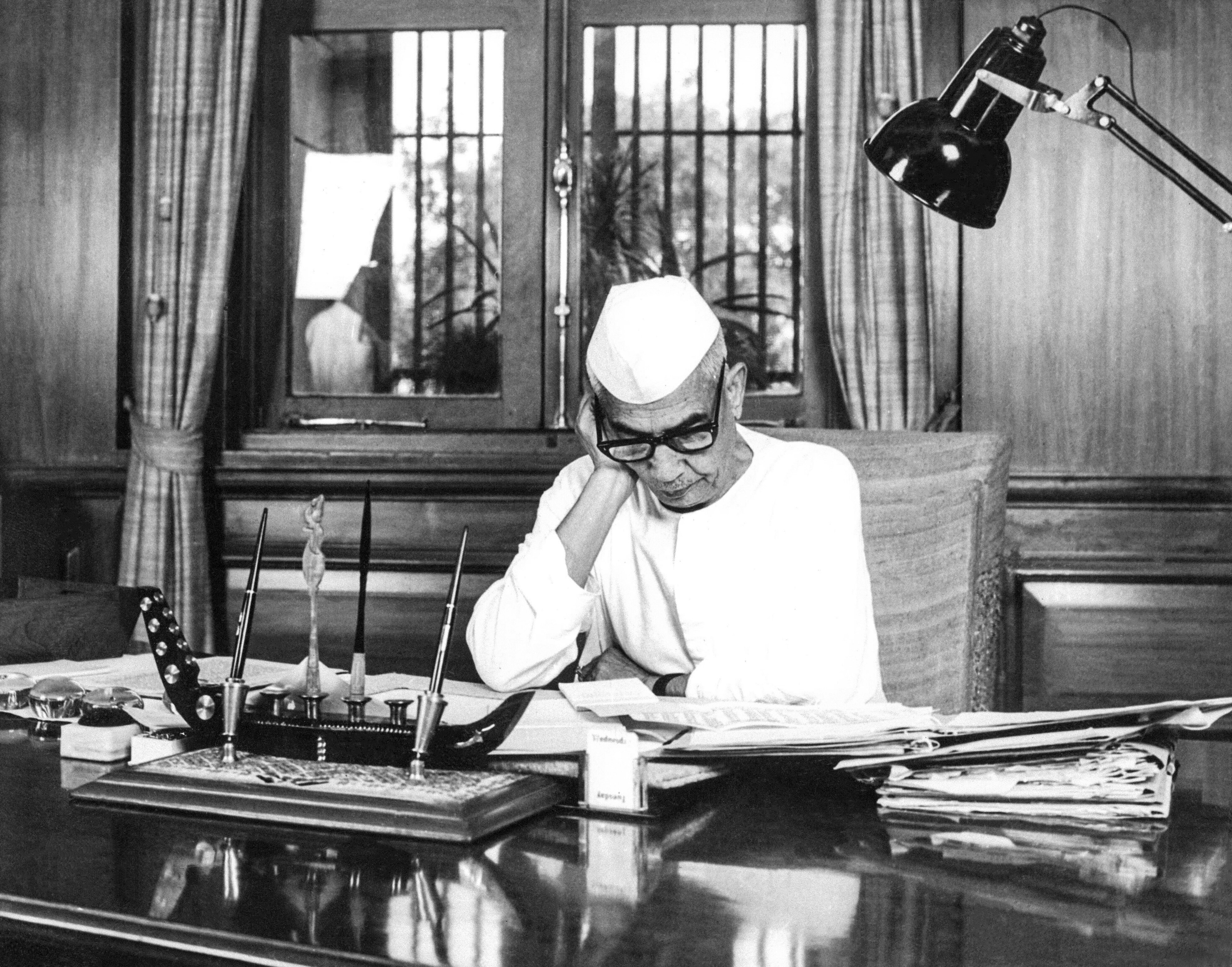
- Prime Minister, Charan Singh
- Date formed: 28 July 1979
- Date dissolved: 14 January 1980

People and organisations
- Head of state: Neelam Sanjiva Reddy
- Head of government: Charan Singh
- Deputy head of government: Yashwantrao Chavan
- Member party: Janata Party (Secular) (Janata (Secular) alliance) (Supported by INC(U) 75/543 and (INC(I) 79/543 MPs).
- Status in legislature: Coalition
- Opposition party: Indian National Congress (Congress alliance)
- Opposition leader: Yashwantrao Chavan (In Lok Sabha); Kamalapati Tripathi (In Rajya Sabha)

History
- Outgoing election: 1980
- Legislature terms: 5 months and 17 days
- Predecessor: Desai ministry
- Successor: Fourth Indira Gandhi ministry

The Charan Singh ministry was a union council of ministers of India, headed by the prime minister of India, Chaudhary Charan Singh, that was formed after Singh was sworn in as prime minister of India on 28 July 1979, with outside support by the Indian National Congress and Yashwantrao Chavan of Congress (Socialist).

== History ==
Morarji Desai resigned as prime minister of India on 28 July 1979 due to internal conflicts within the Janata Party, the party that was a coalition of various factions, united primarily to oppose Indira Gandhi, and faced several ideological and personal differences after coming to power in 1977.

One of the key issues was the growing tension between Desai and Charan Singh, who was the deputy prime minister and home minister of India at that time. Singh and his faction largely represented farmers and rural interests, accusing Desai of favoring industrialists and failing to address agrarian concerns. This crisis escalated when the Janata party split, with Charan Singh breaking away with his Lok Dal faction. Losing majority support in parliament, Desai was forced to resign on 28 July 1979.

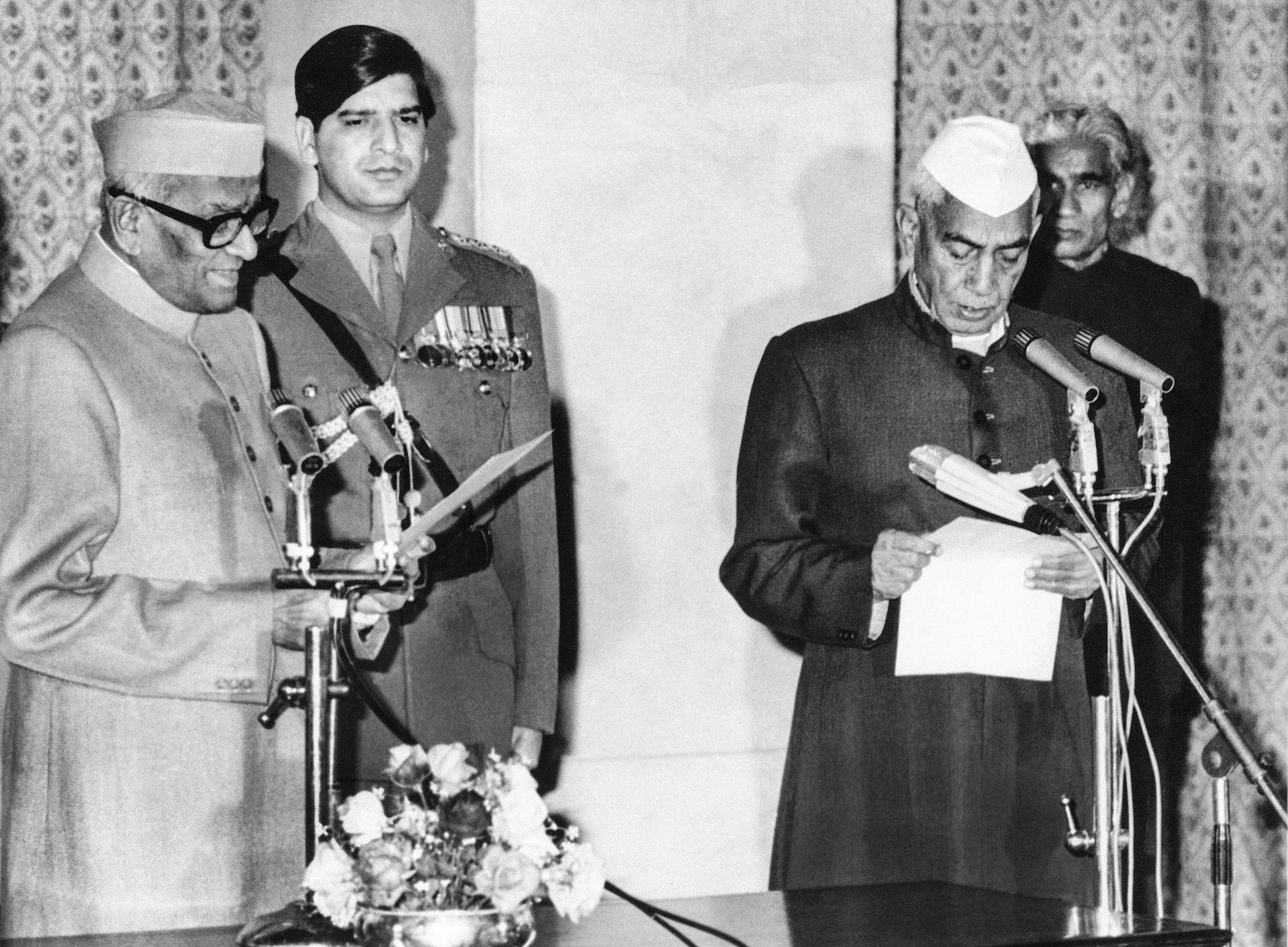
President Neelam Sanjeeva Reddy swearing in Singh as PM

After Desai’s resignation, president Neelam Sanjeeva Reddy invited Charan Singh to form a new government, which he did with external support from Indira Gandhi Congress (I), and the Charan Singh ministry was formed on 28 July 1979.

However, before Charan Singh could prove majority in parliament, Indira Gandhi withdrew her support after Singh said that his government would not drop cases against her, which had been initiated after the emergency (1975-1977), leading to his resignation after just 23 days in office, becoming the only prime minister of India who didn't faced the parliament and Singh continued as caretaker prime minister until 14 January 1980.

== List of Ministers ==
=== Cabinet Ministers ===
Cabinet members
Portfolio	Minister	Took office	Left office	Party	Remarks
Prime Minister; And also in-charge of all other important portfolios and policy issues not allocated to any Minister.	Charan Singh	28 July 1979	14 January 1980	JP(S)	
Deputy Prime Minister; Minister of Home Affairs	Yashwantrao Chavan	28 July 1979	14 January 1980	INC(U)	
Minister of External Affairs	Shyam Nandan Prasad Mishra	28 July 1979	14 January 1980	JP(S)	
Minister of Finance	Hemwati Nandan Bahuguna	28 July 1979	19 October 1979	JP(S)	
Minister of Finance	Charan Singh	19 October 1979	14 January 1980	JP(S)	
Minister of Defence	Chidambaram Subramaniam	30 July 1979	14 January 1980	INC(U)	
Minister of Agriculture and Irrigation	Brahm Prakash	30 July 1979	14 January 1980	INC(U)	
Minister of Information and Broadcasting	Purushottam Kaushik	30 July 1979	14 January 1980	JP(S)	
Minister of Health and Family Welfare	Rabi Ray	28 July 1979	14 January 1980	JP(S)	
Minister of Works, Housing, Supply and Rehabilitation	Ram Kinkar	28 July 1979	14 January 1980	JP(S)	
Minister of Law, Justice and Company Affairs	H. R. Khanna	30 July 1979	3 August 1979	JP(S)	
Minister of Law, Justice and Company Affairs	Shyam Nath Kacker	3 August 1979	14 January 1980	JP(S)	
Minister of Commerce and Civil Supplies	Hitendra Desai	30 July 1979	14 January 1980	JP(S)	
Minister of Steel, Mines and Coal	Biju Patnaik	30 July 1979	14 January 1980	JP(S)	
Minister of Tourism and Civil Aviation	Mohammad Shafi Qureshi	30 July 1979	14 January 1980	JP(S)	
Minister of Labour	Fazlur Rahman	30 July 1979	14 January 1980	JP(S)	
Minister of Education and Culture	Karan Singh	30 July 1979	14 January 1980	INC(U)	
Minister of Education, Social Welfare and Culture	Karan Singh	30 July 1979	19 August 1979	INC(U)	Bifurcated into Ministry of Education and Culture; and Ministry of Social Welfare.
Minister of Education and Culture	Karan Singh	19 August 1979	14 January 1980	INC(U)	
Minister of Railways	T. A. Pai	30 July 1979	14 January 1980	INC(U)	
Minister of Power	K. C. Pant	30 July 1979	14 January 1980	INC(U)	
Minister of Industry	Kasu Brahmananda Reddy	30 July 1979	27 November 1979	INC(U)	
Minister of Industry	T. A. Pai	27 November 1979	14 January 1980	JP(S)	
Minister of Social Welfare	Sathiavani Muthu	19 August 1979	23 December 1979	AIADMK	
Minister of Petroleum, Chemicals and Fertilizers	Aravinda Bala Pajanor	19 August 1979	23 December 1979	AIADMK	
Minister of Communications	Zulfiquarulla	30 July 1979	4 December 1979	JP(S)	Minister of State was responsible.
Minister of Communications	Shyam Nandan Prasad Mishra	7 December 1979	14 January 1980	JP(S)	
Minister of Muslim Waqfs	Zulfiquarulla	30 July 1979	4 December 1979	JP(S)	Minister of State was responsible.
Minister of Muslim Waqfs	Fazlur Rahman	7 December 1979	14 January 1980	JP(S)	

=== Ministers of State (with Independent Charge) ===
Cabinet members
Portfolio	Minister	Took office	Left office	Party
Minister of State in the Ministry of Shipping and Transport	Janeshwar Mishra	30 July 1979	14 January 1980	JP(S)
Minister of State in the Ministry of Rural Reconstruction	Bhanu Pratap Singh	30 July 1979	14 January 1980	JP(S)
Minister of State in the Ministry of Parliamentary Affairs	K. Gopal	4 August 1979	14 January 1980	JP(S)

=== Ministers of State ===
Cabinet members
Portfolio	Minister	Took office	Left office	Party
Minister of State in the Ministry of Home Affairs	Dhanik Lal Mandal	30 July 1979	14 January 1980	JP(S)
Minister of State in the Ministry of Defence	Jagbir Singh	30 July 1979	14 January 1980	JP(S)
Minister of State in the Ministry of Commerce and Civil Supplies	Henry Austin	30 July 1979	14 January 1980	JP(S)
Minister of State in the Ministry of Education, Culture and Social Welfare	Rashida Haque Choudhury	30 July 1979	24 August 1979	INC(U)
Minister of State in the Ministry of Education and Culture	Rashida Haque Choudhury	24 August 1979	14 January 1980	INC(U)
Minister of State in the Ministry of Communications	Narsingh Yadav	30 July 1979	14 January 1980	JP(S)
Minister of State in the Ministry of Communications	Tukaram Shrangare	31 July 1979	14 January 1980	INC(U)
Minister of State in the Ministry of Steel, Mines and Coal	V. Kishore Chandra Deo	4 August 1979	14 January 1980	INC(U)
Minister of State in the Ministry of Steel, Mines and Coal	P. M. Sayeed	4 August 1979	14 January 1980	INC(U)
Minister of State in the Ministry of Agriculture and Irrigation	Nathuram Mirdha	4 August 1979	25 October 1979	INC(U)
Minister of State in the Ministry of Agriculture and Irrigation	M. V. Krishnappa	25 October 1979	14 January 1980	INC(U)
Minister of State in the Ministry of External Affairs	Bedabrata Barua	4 August 1979	14 January 1980	JP(S)
Minister of State in the Ministry of Industry	B. Rachaiah	4 August 1979	14 January 1980	INC(U)
Minister of State in the Ministry of Tourism and Civil Aviation	P. Ankineedu Prasada Rao	4 August 1979	14 January 1980	INC(U)
Minister of State in the Ministry of Petroleum, Chemicals and Fertilizers	Saugata Roy	4 August 1979	14 January 1980	INC(U)
Minister of State in the Ministry of Finance	Nathuram Mirdha	25 October 1979	14 January 1980	INC(U)
