= Jahanara Jaipal Singh =

Indian politician (born 1923)

Union Deputy Minister of Transport and Aviation
- In office 15 February 1966 – 13 March 1967
- Prime Minister: Indira Gandhi
- Minister: Neelam Sanjiva Reddy
- Preceded by: Mohiuddin Ahmed
- Succeeded by: Bhakt Darshan

Union Deputy Minister of Tourism and Civil Aviation
- In office 18 March 1967 – 14 February 1969
- Prime Minister: Indira Gandhi
- Minister: Karan Singh
- Succeeded by: Sarojini Mahishi

Union Deputy Minister of Education and Youth Services
- In office 14 February 1969 – 27 June 1970
- Prime Minister: Indira Gandhi
- Minister: V. K. R. V. Rao
- Succeeded by: Amiya Kumar Kisku

Member of Parliament, Rajya Sabha
- In office 3 April 1958 – 2 April 1970
- Constituency: Bihar
- In office 10 April 1972 – 9 April 1978

Personal details
- Born: Jahanara Jeyaratnam; 31 May 1923 Nagpur, Maharashtra
- Died: 18 February 2004 (aged 80)
- Party: Indian National Congress
- Spouse: Jaipal Singh Munda (m. 1954)
- Parent: T.C.S. Jeyarathnam (father)
- Education: Diploma in Montessori teaching

Jahanara Jaipal Singh (born Jahanara Jeyaratnam; 31 May 1923 - 18 February 2004) was an Indian politician. She was a Member of Parliament, representing Bihar in the Rajya Sabha the upper house of India's Parliament as a member of the Indian National Congress.
