= International Road Federation India Chapter =

Road safety organisation in India

International Road Federation India Chapter(IRF IC)
- Founded: 2009
- Type: Non-governmental organization
- Headquarters: New Delhi
- President (Emeritus), IRF-GPC: Mr. K. K. Kapila
- President: Lt. Gen. Harpal Singh (Retd.)
- Website: https://indiairf.com/

The International Road Federation India Chapter is a chapter of the International Road Federation, presently headed by Harpal Singh (lieutenant general) as President. The India Chapter of the IRF has been active in India since February 2009 and has taken up road safety as its mission alongside its Geneva based parent body, International Road Federation, which has worked on Indian road safety programs since 2005.

== Activities ==
The IRF's India Chapter advocates for improved design, maintenance, and management of Indian roads to make them economic, safe, and sustainable. It comprises public and private sector road infrastructure interests. The India Chapter of IRF also works with some entrepreneurs to create examples of best practices in the provision of built-in safety of the highest standards, such as improving the visibility of motorcyclists and pedestrians in traffic. While advocating for a mandatory road safety audit for vehicles, it has supported a mandatory provision of in-vehicle safety devices similar to those in the developed world, and the deployment of appropriate intelligent transportation system devices to assist in enforcement. The organization is funded primarily through member fees.

To that end, the organization, together with the French government and a major Indian automotive organization, also helped develop trauma care and first-aid training for commercial vehicle drivers to assist in road injuries before medical services arrive.

=== Road safety ===
India's huge road development program requires road building to be compliant with the highest level of safety. As a consequence, the IRF's India Chapter has garnered support from all related Government and private sector bodies. Particularly, It works closely with the Ministry of Road Transport & Highways to develop solutions for the high number of road fatalities in India.

In 2014 the IRF IC launched a major drive to promote the visibility of cyclists. Since its inception, IRF's Indian Chapter has been actively involved in multiple and diverse areas of work relating to road safety issues. The Indian Academy of Highway Engineers, in association with IRF IC and ARBB organized a two-month course on road safety engineering and auditing in mid-2016. During the same year the IRF's India Chapter participated in a conference hosted by the South African Road Federation.

== Conferences ==
Among its many activities, its annual Conferences on Road Safety themes have attracted global participation and have been lauded for their content and deliberations on strategic issues. Nine IRF Regional Conferences have been organized in India on special themes. The Ministry of Road Transport and Highways has taken up some of the recommendations of these Conferences, some of which are being implemented in India.

IRF and its India Chapter will together organize the World Road Meeting Conference for 2017 in New Delhi, India.
