= TTK Group =

Indian business conglomerate

- Industry: Conglomerate
- Founded: 1928; 98 years ago in Madras, British India
- Founder: T. T. Krishnamachari
- Area served: Worldwide
- Subsidiaries: TTK Prestige; TTK Healthcare; TTK Services

The TTK Group is an Indian business conglomerate with a presence across several segments of industry including consumer durables, pharmaceuticals and supplements, bio-medical devices, maps and atlases, consular visa services, virtual assistant services and health care services.

== History ==
The TTK Group was founded in 1928 by T. T. Krishnamachari as T. T. Krishnamachari & Co., a distributor for Lever Brothers and Beecham.

The TTK Group introduced condoms in India in 1948 through a joint venture with London Rubber Company (later London International Group), which became TTK-LIG and was publicly listed in 1974 (though later delisted). TTK created the Kohinoor brand in 1979 and began manufacturing Durex in 1997. After Reckitt Benckiser became its partner in 2010 through acquisitions, a dispute over the agreement went to court. TTK bought out Reckitt's 49.8 per cent stake and the manufacturing unit but lost the Durex and Kohinoor brands. TTK then set up TTK Protective Devices—which later merged with TTK Healthcare—and launched the Skore brand of condoms.

In 2011, The Cigna Group, an American healthcare and insurance company, formed a joint venture with the TTK Group, called Cigna TTK, to develop a health insurance business in India. TTK Group sold all of its stake in the joint venture to the Manipal Group in 2019, and the joint venture changed its name to ManipalCigna.

== Structure ==
The TTK Group is a group of companies controlled through T. T. Krishnamachari & Co., a partnership firm that acts as the promoter of the group's listed companies. The firm's partners are members of the founder's family. As of 2025, it held about 60% of TTK Prestige and about 67% stake in TTK Healthcare. TTK Prestige manufactures and sells kitchen appliances such as pressure cookers and mixers. TTK Healthcare manufactures the Skore brand of condoms and owns Love Depot, an online store selling sex-toys under the Skore and MsChief brand names.
