= Minister of Finance (India) =

Head of the Ministry of Finance in India

Minister of Finance Finance Minister
- Vitta Mantrī
- Emblem of the Ministry of Finance

- Flag of India

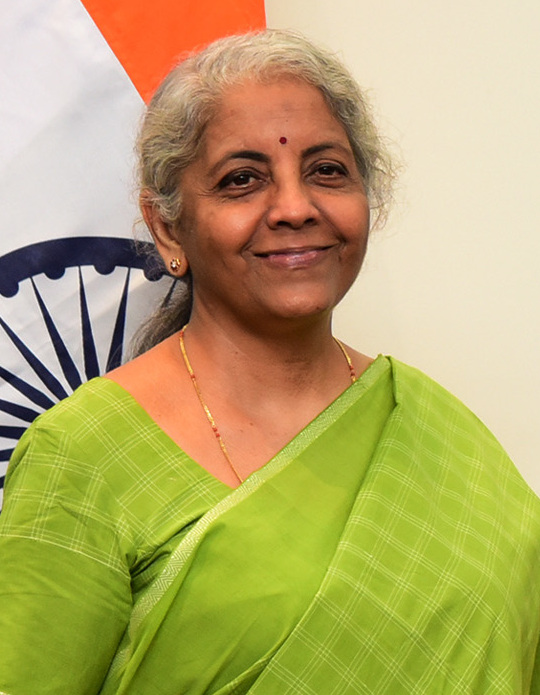
- Incumbent; Nirmala Sitharaman since 30 May 2019
- Ministry of Finance
- Style: The Honourable
- Abbreviation: FM
- Member of: Union Council of Ministers
- Reports to: Parliament of India
- Appointer: President of India; on the recommendation of the Prime Minister
- Formation: 15 August 1947
- First holder: R. K. Shanmukham Chetty
- Deputy: Pankaj Chaudhary, MoS
- Salary: ₹124,000 (US$1,300) monthly (Note: Minister of Finance gets the same salary as a Member of Parliament in India. In addition to the basic pay, there is a constituency allowance of ₹87,000, office allowance of ₹75,000 per month, and other emoluments.)

The minister of finance or the finance minister (ISO: Vitta Mantrī) is the head of the Ministry of Finance and a high-ranking minister in the Union Council of Ministers of the Government of India. The finance minister is responsible for the fiscal policy of the government, and presents the annual union budget in the Indian parliament. The minister is usually a member of the Cabinet Committee on Security, and the National Security Council. The finance minister is assisted by a minister of state and, less commonly by a deputy minister.

The first finance minister of independent India was R. K. Shanmukham Chetty of the Indian National Congress, who served in the First Nehru ministry from 15 August 1947 to 17 August 1948. P. Chidambaram of the Congress has had the longest tenure, serving for eight years and 41 days. Nirmala Sitharaman of the Bharatiya Janata Party is the incumbent finance minister, serving since 31 May 2019.

Two finance ministers–R.Venkataraman and Pranab Mukherjee, had gone on to serve as the president later. Four finance ministers–Morarji Desai, Charan Singh, Vishwanath Pratap Singh, and Manmohan Singh, later served as the prime minister.

== Cabinet ministers ==
Portrait	Minister (Birth-Death) Constituency	Term of office			Political party	Ministry	Prime Minister
Portrait	Minister (Birth-Death) Constituency	From	To	Period	Political party	Ministry	Prime Minister
Pre-independence (1946–1947)
	Liaquat Ali Khan (1895–1951)	29 October 1946	14 August 1947	289 days	All-India Muslim League	Interim	Jawaharlal Nehru (Note: Vice President of Executive Council)
After independence (1947–present)
	R. K. Shanmukham Chetty (1892–1953); Unelected	15 August 1947	17 August 1948	1 year, 2 days	Indian National Congress	Nehru I	Jawaharlal Nehru
	Kshitish Chandra Neogy (1888–1970); MCA for West Bengal	18 August 1948	22 September 1948	36 days	Indian National Congress	Nehru I	Jawaharlal Nehru
	John Matthai (1886–1959); MP for United Provinces	22 September 1948	1 June 1950	1 year, 252 days	Indian National Congress	Nehru I	Jawaharlal Nehru
	C. D. Deshmukh (1896–1982); MP for Kolaba	1 June 1950	15 April 1952	6 years, 53 days	Indian National Congress	Nehru I	Jawaharlal Nehru
	C. D. Deshmukh (1896–1982); MP for Kolaba	15 April 1952	24 July 1956	6 years, 53 days	Indian National Congress	Nehru II	Jawaharlal Nehru
	Jawaharlal Nehru (1889–1964); MP for Phulpur (Prime Minister)	24 July 1956	30 August 1956	37 days	Indian National Congress	Nehru II	Jawaharlal Nehru
	T. T. Krishnamachari (1899–1974); MP for Madras South	30 August 1956	4 April 1957	217 days	Indian National Congress	Nehru II	Jawaharlal Nehru
	T. T. Krishnamachari (1899–1974); MP for Madras South	4 April 1957	13 February 1958	217 days	Indian National Congress	Nehru III	Jawaharlal Nehru
	Morarji Desai (1896–1995); MP for Surat	13 February 1958	2 April 1962	5 years, 199 days	Indian National Congress	Nehru III	Jawaharlal Nehru
	Morarji Desai (1896–1995); MP for Surat	2 April 1962	31 August 1963	5 years, 199 days	Indian National Congress	Nehru IV	Jawaharlal Nehru
	T. T. Krishnamachari (1899–1974); MP for Tiruchendur	31 August 1963	27 May 1964	2 years, 122 days	Indian National Congress	Nehru IV	Jawaharlal Nehru
	T. T. Krishnamachari (1899–1974); MP for Tiruchendur	27 May 1964	9 June 1964	2 years, 122 days	Indian National Congress	Nanda I	Gulzarilal Nanda
	T. T. Krishnamachari (1899–1974); MP for Tiruchendur	9 June 1964	31 December 1965	2 years, 122 days	Indian National Congress	Shastri	Lal Bahadur Shastri
	Sachindra Chaudhuri (1903–1992); MP for Ghatal	1 January 1966	11 January 1966	1 year, 70 days	Indian National Congress	Shastri	Lal Bahadur Shastri
	Sachindra Chaudhuri (1903–1992); MP for Ghatal	11 January 1966	24 January 1966	1 year, 70 days	Indian National Congress	Nanda II	Gulzarilal Nanda
	Sachindra Chaudhuri (1903–1992); MP for Ghatal	24 January 1966	12 March 1967	1 year, 70 days	Indian National Congress	Indira I	Indira Gandhi
	Morarji Desai (1896–1995); MP for Surat (Deputy Prime Minister)	13 March 1967	16 July 1969	2 years, 125 days	Indian National Congress	Indira II	Indira Gandhi
	Indira Gandhi (1917–1984); MP for Rae Bareli (Prime Minister)	16 July 1969	27 June 1970	346 days	Indian National Congress (R)	Indira II	Indira Gandhi
	Yashwantrao Chavan (1913–1984); MP for Satara	27 June 1970	13 March 1971	4 years, 105 days	Indian National Congress (R)	Indira II	Indira Gandhi
	Yashwantrao Chavan (1913–1984); MP for Satara	13 March 1971	10 October 1974	4 years, 105 days	Indian National Congress (R)	Indira III	Indira Gandhi
	Chidambaram Subramaniam (1910–2000); MP for Krishnagiri	10 October 1974	24 March 1977	2 years, 165 days	Indian National Congress (R)	Indira III	Indira Gandhi
	Morarji Desai (1896–1995); MP for Surat (Prime Minister)	24 March 1977	26 March 1977	2 days	Janata Party	Desai	Morarji Desai
	Hirubhai M. Patel (1904–1993); MP for Sabarkantha	26 March 1977	24 January 1979	1 year, 304 days	Janata Party	Desai	Morarji Desai
	Charan Singh (1902–1987); MP for Baghpat (Deputy Prime Minister)	24 January 1979	16 July 1979	173 days	Janata Party	Desai	Morarji Desai
	Morarji Desai (1896–1995); MP for Surat (Prime Minister)	16 July 1979	28 July 1979	12 days	Janata Party	Desai	Morarji Desai
	Hemwati Nandan Bahuguna (1919–1989); MP for Lucknow	28 July 1979	19 October 1979	83 days	Janata Party (Secular)	Charan	Charan Singh
	Charan Singh (1902–1987); MP for Baghpat (Prime Minister)	19 October 1979	14 January 1980	87 days	Janata Party (Secular)	Charan	Charan Singh
	Ramaswamy Venkataraman (1910–2009); MP for Madras South	14 January 1980	15 January 1982	2 years, 1 day	Indian National Congress (I)	Indira IV	Indira Gandhi
	Pranab Mukherjee (1935–2020); Rajya Sabha MP for Gujarat	15 January 1982	31 October 1984	2 years, 351 days	Indian National Congress (I)	Indira IV	Indira Gandhi
	Pranab Mukherjee (1935–2020); Rajya Sabha MP for Gujarat	31 October 1984	31 December 1984	2 years, 351 days	Indian National Congress (I)	Rajiv I	Rajiv Gandhi
	Vishwanath Pratap Singh (1931–2008); Rajya Sabha MP for Uttar Pradesh	31 December 1984	24 January 1987	2 years, 24 days	Indian National Congress (I)	Rajiv II	Rajiv Gandhi
	Rajiv Gandhi (1944–1991); MP for Amethi (Prime Minister)	24 January 1987	25 July 1987	182 days	Indian National Congress (I)	Rajiv II	Rajiv Gandhi
	N. D. Tiwari (1925–2018); Rajya Sabha MP for Uttar Pradesh	25 July 1987	25 June 1988	336 days	Indian National Congress (I)	Rajiv II	Rajiv Gandhi
	Shankarrao Chavan (1920–2004); MP for Nanded	25 June 1988	2 December 1989	1 year, 160 days	Indian National Congress (I)	Rajiv II	Rajiv Gandhi
	Vishwanath Pratap Singh (1931–2008); MP for Fatehpur (Prime Minister)	2 December 1989	5 December 1989	3 days	Janata Dal	Vishwanath	Vishwanath Pratap Singh
	Madhu Dandavate (1924–2005); MP for Rajapur	6 December 1989	10 November 1990	339 days	Janata Dal	Vishwanath	Vishwanath Pratap Singh
	Chandra Shekhar (1927–2007); MP for Ballia (Prime Minister)	10 November 1990	21 November 1990	11 days	Samajwadi Janata Party (Rashtriya)	Chandra Shekhar	Chandra Shekhar
	Yashwant Sinha (born 1937); Rajya Sabha MP for Bihar	21 November 1990	21 June 1991	212 days	Samajwadi Janata Party (Rashtriya)	Chandra Shekhar	Chandra Shekhar
	Manmohan Singh (1932–2024); Rajya Sabha MP for Assam	21 June 1991	16 May 1996	4 years, 330 days	Indian National Congress (I)	Rao	P. V. Narasimha Rao
	Jaswant Singh (1938–2020); MP for Chittorgarh	16 May 1996	1 June 1996	16 days	Bharatiya Janata Party	Vajpayee I	Atal Bihari Vajpayee
	P. Chidambaram (born 1945); MP for Sivaganga	1 June 1996	21 April 1997	324 days	Tamil Maanila Congress	Deve Gowda	H. D. Deve Gowda
	Inder Kumar Gujral (1919–2012); Rajya Sabha MP for Bihar (Prime Minister)	21 April 1997	1 May 1997	10 days	Janata Dal	Gujral	Inder Kumar Gujral
	P. Chidambaram (born 1945); MP for Sivaganga	1 May 1997	19 March 1998	322 days	Tamil Maanila Congress	Gujral	Inder Kumar Gujral
	Yashwant Sinha (born 1937); MP for Hazaribagh	19 March 1998	13 October 1999	4 years, 104 days	Bharatiya Janata Party	Vajpayee II	Atal Bihari Vajpayee
	Yashwant Sinha (born 1937); MP for Hazaribagh	13 October 1999	1 July 2002	4 years, 104 days	Bharatiya Janata Party	Vajpayee III	Atal Bihari Vajpayee
	Jaswant Singh (1938–2020); Rajya Sabha MP for Rajasthan	1 July 2002	22 May 2004	1 year, 326 days	Bharatiya Janata Party	Vajpayee III	Atal Bihari Vajpayee
	P. Chidambaram (born 1945); MP for Sivaganga	23 May 2004	30 November 2008	4 years, 191 days	Indian National Congress	Manmohan I	Manmohan Singh
	Manmohan Singh (1932–2024); Rajya Sabha MP for Assam (Prime Minister)	30 November 2008	24 January 2009	55 days	Indian National Congress	Manmohan I	Manmohan Singh
	Pranab Mukherjee (1935–2020); MP for Jangipur	24 January 2009	22 May 2009	3 years, 154 days	Indian National Congress	Manmohan I	Manmohan Singh
	Pranab Mukherjee (1935–2020); MP for Jangipur	23 May 2009	26 June 2012	3 years, 154 days	Indian National Congress	Manmohan II	Manmohan Singh
	Manmohan Singh (1932–2024); Rajya Sabha MP for Assam (Prime Minister)	26 June 2012	31 July 2012	35 days	Indian National Congress	Manmohan II	Manmohan Singh
	P. Chidambaram (born 1945); MP for Sivaganga	31 July 2012	26 May 2014	1 year, 299 days	Indian National Congress	Manmohan II	Manmohan Singh
	Arun Jaitley (1952–2019); Rajya Sabha MP for Gujarat, till 2018; Rajya Sabha MP for Uttar Pradesh, from 2018	27 May 2014	14 May 2018	3 years, 352 days	Bharatiya Janata Party	Modi I	Narendra Modi
	Piyush Goyal (born 1964); Rajya Sabha MP for Maharashtra	14 May 2018	23 August 2018	101 days	Bharatiya Janata Party	Modi I	Narendra Modi
	Arun Jaitley (1952–2019); Rajya Sabha MP for Uttar Pradesh	23 August 2018	23 January 2019	153 days	Bharatiya Janata Party	Modi I	Narendra Modi
	Piyush Goyal (born 1964); Rajya Sabha MP for Maharashtra	23 January 2019	15 February 2019	23 days	Bharatiya Janata Party	Modi I	Narendra Modi
	Arun Jaitley (1952–2019); Rajya Sabha MP for Uttar Pradesh	15 February 2019	30 May 2019	104 days	Bharatiya Janata Party	Modi I	Narendra Modi
	Nirmala Sitharaman (born 1959); Rajya Sabha MP for Karnataka	31 May 2019	Incumbent	7 years, 173 days	Bharatiya Janata Party	Modi II	Narendra Modi
	Nirmala Sitharaman (born 1959); Rajya Sabha MP for Karnataka	31 May 2019	Incumbent	7 years, 173 days	Bharatiya Janata Party	Modi III	Narendra Modi

== Ministers of state ==
Portrait	Minister (Birth-Death) Constituency	Term of office			Political party	Ministry	Prime Minister
Portrait	Minister (Birth-Death) Constituency	From	To	Period	Political party	Ministry	Prime Minister
	Mahavir Tyagi (1899–1980); MP for United Provinces (Interim); MP for Dehradun; Minister of Revenue and Expenditure, from 21 August 1952	16 February 1951	13 May 1952	2 years, 28 days	Indian National Congress	Nehru I	Jawaharlal Nehru
	Mahavir Tyagi (1899–1980); MP for United Provinces (Interim); MP for Dehradun; Minister of Revenue and Expenditure, from 21 August 1952	13 May 1952	16 March 1953	2 years, 28 days	Indian National Congress	Nehru II	Jawaharlal Nehru
	Arun Chandra Guha; MP for Barasat; Minister of Revenue and Defence Expenditure	7 December 1954	17 April 1957	2 years, 131 days	Indian National Congress	Nehru II	Jawaharlal Nehru
	Manilal Chaturbhai Shah; Rajya Sabha MP for Bombay State; Minister of Revenue and Civil Expenditure	7 December 1954	17 April 1957	2 years, 131 days	Indian National Congress	Nehru II	Jawaharlal Nehru
	Bezawada Gopala Reddy (1907–1997); MP for Kavali; Minister of Revenue and Civil Expenditure	10 May 1958	7 April 1961	2 years, 332 days	Indian National Congress	Nehru III	Jawaharlal Nehru
	Bali Ram Bhagat (1922–2011); MP for Arrah (Coordination)	1 November 1963	27 May 1964	221 days	Indian National Congress	Nehru IV	Jawaharlal Nehru
	Bali Ram Bhagat (1922–2011); MP for Arrah (Coordination)	27 May 1964	9 June 1964	221 days	Indian National Congress	Nanda I	Gulzarilal Nanda
	Bali Ram Bhagat (1922–2011); MP for Arrah (Coordination)	13 June 1964	11 January 1966	1 year, 212 days	Indian National Congress	Shastri	Lal Bahadur Shastri
	C. M. Poonacha (1910–1990); Rajya Sabha MP for Mysore; Minister of Revenue and Expenditure	2 January 1966	11 January 1966	22 days	Indian National Congress	Shastri	Lal Bahadur Shastri
	C. M. Poonacha (1910–1990); Rajya Sabha MP for Mysore; Minister of Revenue and Expenditure	11 January 1966	24 January 1966	13 days	Indian National Congress	Nanda II	Gulzarilal Nanda
	Bali Ram Bhagat (1922–2011); MP for Arrah (Coordination)	11 January 1966	24 January 1966	13 days	Indian National Congress	Nanda II	Gulzarilal Nanda
	Bali Ram Bhagat (1922–2011); MP for Arrah	24 January 1966	13 March 1967	1 year, 48 days	Indian National Congress	Indira I	Indira Gandhi
	Prakash Chandra Sethi (1919–1996); MP for Indore	14 February 1969	27 June 1970	1 year, 133 days	Indian National Congress (R)	Indira II	Indira Gandhi
	Raghunath Keshav Khadilkar (1905–1979); MP for Baramati	7 November 1969	27 June 1970	232 days	Indian National Congress (R)	Indira II	Indira Gandhi
	Vidya Charan Shukla (1929–2013); MP for Mahasamund, until 1971; MP for Raipur, from 1971	27 June 1970	18 March 1971	309 days	Indian National Congress (R)	Indira II	Indira Gandhi
	Vidya Charan Shukla (1929–2013); MP for Mahasamund, until 1971; MP for Raipur, from 1971	18 March 1971	2 May 1971	309 days	Indian National Congress (R)	Indira III	Indira Gandhi
	K. R. Ganesh (1922–2004); MP for Andaman and Nicobar Islands	2 May 1971	10 October 1974	3 years, 161 days	Indian National Congress (R)	Indira III	Indira Gandhi
	Pranab Mukherjee (1935–2020); Rajya Sabha MP for West Bengal (Revenue and Banking, from 21 December 1975)	10 October 1974	24 March 1977	2 years, 165 days	Indian National Congress (R)	Indira III	Indira Gandhi
	Zulfiquarullah; MP for Sultanpur	14 August 1977	15 July 1979	1 year, 335 days	Janata Party	Desai	Morarji Desai
	Satish Chandra Agarwal (1928–1997); MP for Jaipur	14 August 1977	28 July 1979	1 year, 348 days	Janata Party	Desai	Morarji Desai
	Nathuram Mirdha (1921–1996); MP for Nagaur	25 October 1979	14 January 1980	81 days	Janata Party (Secular)	Charan	Charan Singh
	Jagannath Pahadia (1932–1991); MP for Bayana	14 January 1980	6 June 1980	144 days	Indian National Congress (I)	Indira IV	Indira Gandhi
	Sawai Singh Sisodiya (1919–2007); Rajya Sabha MP for Madhya Pradesh (Revenue and Expenditure)	19 October 1980	2 September 1982	1 year, 318 days	Indian National Congress (I)	Indira IV	Indira Gandhi
	S. B. P. Pattabhirama Rao (1911–1998); MP for Rajahmundry	2 September 1982	7 February 1984	1 year, 158 days	Indian National Congress (I)	Indira IV	Indira Gandhi
	S. M. Krishna (1932–2024); MP for Mandya	7 February 1984	7 September 1984	213 days	Indian National Congress (I)	Indira IV	Indira Gandhi
	Janardhana Poojary (born 1937); MP for Mangalore	31 December 1984	14 February 1988	3 years, 45 days	Indian National Congress (I)	Rajiv II	Rajiv Gandhi
	B. K. Gadhvi (1937–2005); MP for Banaskantha	12 May 1986	2 December 1989	3 years, 204 days	Indian National Congress (I)	Rajiv II	Rajiv Gandhi
	Brahm Dutt (1926–2014); MP for Tehri Garhwal	24 January 1987	25 July 1987	182 days	Indian National Congress (I)	Rajiv II	Rajiv Gandhi
	Ajit Kumar Panja (1936–2008); MP for Calcutta North East (Revenue)	14 February 1988	2 December 1989	1 year, 291 days	Indian National Congress (I)	Rajiv II	Rajiv Gandhi
	Eduardo Faleiro (born 1940); MP for Mormugao (Economic Affairs)	14 February 1988	2 December 1989	1 year, 291 days	Indian National Congress (I)	Rajiv II	Rajiv Gandhi
	Dalbir Singh; MP for Shahdol	21 June 1991	17 January 1993	1 year, 210 days	Indian National Congress (I)	Rao	P. V. Narasimha Rao
	Shantaram Potdukhe (1933–2018); MP for Chandrapur	21 June 1991	17 January 1993	1 year, 210 days	Indian National Congress (I)	Rao	P. V. Narasimha Rao
	Rameshwar Thakur (1925–2015); Rajya Sabha MP for Bihar	26 June 1991	18 January 1993	1 year, 206 days	Indian National Congress (I)	Rao	P. V. Narasimha Rao
	M. V. Chandrashekara Murthy (1939–2001); MP for Kanakapura (Revenue and Expenditure)	18 January 1993	16 May 1996	3 years, 119 days	Indian National Congress (I)	Rao	P. V. Narasimha Rao
	Abrar Ahmed (1956–2004); Rajya Sabha MP for Rajasthan	18 January 1993	2 April 1994	1 year, 74 days	Indian National Congress (I)	Rao	P. V. Narasimha Rao
	Debi Prasad Pal (1927–2021); MP for Calcutta North West	15 September 1995	16 May 1996	244 days	Indian National Congress (I)	Rao	P. V. Narasimha Rao
	M. P. Veerendra Kumar (1936–2020); MP for Kozhikode	21 February 1997	21 April 1997	108 days	Janata Dal	Deve Gowda	H. D. Deve Gowda
	M. P. Veerendra Kumar (1936–2020); MP for Kozhikode	21 April 1997	9 June 1997	108 days	Janata Dal	Gujral	Inder Kumar Gujral
	Satpal Maharaj (born 1951); MP for Garhwal	9 June 1997	19 March 1998	283 days	All India Indira Congress (Tiwari)	Gujral	Inder Kumar Gujral
	R. K. Kumar (1942–1999); Rajya Sabha MP for Tamil Nadu (Revenue, Banking and Insurance)	19 March 1998	22 May 1998	64 days	All India Anna Dravida Munnetra Kazhagam	Vajpayee II	Atal Bihari Vajpayee
	Kadambur R. Janarthanan (1929–2020); MP for Tirunelveli	22 May 1998	8 April 1999	321 days	All India Anna Dravida Munnetra Kazhagam	Vajpayee II	Atal Bihari Vajpayee
	Balasaheb Vikhe Patil (1932–2016); MP for Kopargaon	13 October 1999	1 July 2002	2 years, 261 days	Shiv Sena	Vajpayee III	Atal Bihari Vajpayee
	V. Dhananjay Kumar (1951–2019); MP for Mangalore	13 October 1999	30 September 2000	353 days	Bharatiya Janata Party	Vajpayee III	Atal Bihari Vajpayee
	Gingee N. Ramachandran (born 1944); MP for Tindivanam	30 September 2000	24 May 2003	2 years, 236 days	Marumalarchi Dravida Munnetra Kazhagam	Vajpayee III	Atal Bihari Vajpayee
	Anant Geete (born 1951); MP for Ratnagiri (Banking and Expenditure)	1 July 2002	26 August 2002	56 days	Shiv Sena	Vajpayee III	Atal Bihari Vajpayee
	Anandrao Vithoba Adsul (born 1947); MP for Buldhana	26 August 2002	22 May 2004	1 year, 270 days	Shiv Sena	Vajpayee III	Atal Bihari Vajpayee
	Shripad Naik (born 1952); MP for Panaji	8 September 2003	22 May 2004	257 days	Bharatiya Janata Party	Vajpayee III	Atal Bihari Vajpayee
	S. S. Palanimanickam (born 1950); MP for Thanjavur (Revenue, from 29 January 2006)	25 May 2004	22 May 2009	4 years, 362 days	Dravida Munnetra Kazhagam	Manmohan I	Manmohan Singh
	Pawan Kumar Bansal (born 1948); MP for Chandigarh (Expenditure, Banking and Insurance)	29 January 2006	22 May 2009	3 years, 113 days	Indian National Congress	Manmohan I	Manmohan Singh
	S. S. Palanimanickam (born 1950); MP for Thanjavur (Revenue)	28 May 2009	21 March 2013	3 years, 297 days	Dravida Munnetra Kazhagam	Manmohan II	Manmohan Singh
	Namo Narain Meena (born 1943); MP for Tonk–Sawai Madhopur (Expenditure, Banking and Insurance)	28 May 2009	26 May 2014	4 years, 363 days	Indian National Congress	Manmohan II	Manmohan Singh
	Jesudasu Seelam (born 1953); Rajya Sabha MP for Andhra Pradesh (Revenue)	17 June 2013	26 May 2014	343 days	Indian National Congress	Manmohan II	Manmohan Singh
	Nirmala Sitharaman (born 1959); Rajya Sabha MP for Andhra Pradesh	27 May 2014	9 November 2014	166 days	Bharatiya Janata Party	Modi I	Narendra Modi
	Jayant Sinha (born 1963); MP for Hazaribagh	9 November 2014	5 July 2016	1 year, 239 days	Bharatiya Janata Party	Modi I	Narendra Modi
	Santosh Kumar Gangwar (born 1948); MP for Bareilly	5 July 2016	3 September 2017	1 year, 60 days	Bharatiya Janata Party	Modi I	Narendra Modi
	Arjun Ram Meghwal (born 1953); MP for Bikaner	5 July 2016	3 September 2017	1 year, 60 days	Bharatiya Janata Party	Modi I	Narendra Modi
	Pon Radhakrishnan (born 1952); MP for Kanniyakumari	3 September 2017	30 May 2019	1 year, 269 days	Bharatiya Janata Party	Modi I	Narendra Modi
	Shiv Pratap Shukla (born 1952); Rajya Sabha MP for Uttar Pradesh	3 September 2017	30 May 2019	1 year, 269 days	Bharatiya Janata Party	Modi I	Narendra Modi
	Anurag Singh Thakur (born 1974); MP for Hamirpur	31 May 2019	7 July 2021	2 years, 37 days	Bharatiya Janata Party	Modi II	Narendra Modi
	Pankaj Chaudhary (born 1964); MP for Maharajganj	7 July 2021	9 June 2024	2 years, 338 days	Bharatiya Janata Party	Modi II	Narendra Modi
	Bhagwat Karad (born 1956); Rajya Sabha MP for Maharashtra	7 July 2021	9 June 2024	2 years, 338 days	Bharatiya Janata Party	Modi II	Narendra Modi
	Pankaj Chaudhary (born 1964); MP for Maharajganj	10 June 2024	Incumbent	2 years, 163 days	Bharatiya Janata Party	Modi III	Narendra Modi

== Deputy ministers ==
Portrait	Minister (Birth-Death) Constituency	Term of office			Political party	Ministry	Prime Minister
Portrait	Minister (Birth-Death) Constituency	From	To	Period	Political party	Ministry	Prime Minister
	Manilal Chaturbhai Shah; Rajya Sabha MP for Bombay State	12 August 1952	7 December 1954	2 years, 117 days	Indian National Congress	Nehru II	Jawaharlal Nehru
	Arun Chandra Guha; MP for Barasat	18 March 1953	7 December 1954	1 year, 264 days	Indian National Congress	Nehru II	Jawaharlal Nehru
	Bali Ram Bhagat (1922–2011); MP for Arrah	4 January 1956	17 April 1957	6 years, 96 days	Indian National Congress	Nehru II	Jawaharlal Nehru
	Bali Ram Bhagat (1922–2011); MP for Arrah	17 April 1957	10 April 1962	6 years, 96 days	Indian National Congress	Nehru III	Jawaharlal Nehru
	Tarkeshwari Sinha (1926–2007); MP for Barh	10 May 1958	10 April 1962	3 years, 335 days	Indian National Congress	Nehru III	Jawaharlal Nehru
	Bali Ram Bhagat (1922–2011); MP for Arrah	16 April 1962	21 September 1963	1 year, 158 days	Indian National Congress	Nehru IV	Jawaharlal Nehru
	Tarkeshwari Sinha (1926–2007); MP for Barh	16 April 1962	27 May 1964	2 years, 54 days	Indian National Congress	Nehru IV	Jawaharlal Nehru
	Tarkeshwari Sinha (1926–2007); MP for Barh	27 May 1964	9 June 1964	2 years, 54 days	Indian National Congress	Nanda I	Gulzarilal Nanda
	Rameshwar Sahu; MP for Rosera	1 October 1964	11 January 1966	1 year, 102 days	Indian National Congress	Shastri	Lal Bahadur Shastri
	Rameshwar Sahu; MP for Rosera	11 January 1966	24 January 1966	1 year, 102 days	Indian National Congress	Nanda II	Gulzarilal Nanda
	Lalit Narayan Mishra (1923–1975); Rajya Sabha MP for Bihar	24 January 1966	13 March 1967	1 year, 48 days	Indian National Congress	Indira I	Indira Gandhi
	Jagannath Pahadia (1932–1991); MP for Bayana	13 November 1967	17 October 1969	1 year, 338 days	Indian National Congress	Indira II	Indira Gandhi
	K. R. Ganesh (1922–2004); MP for Andaman and Nicobar Islands	26 June 1970	18 March 1971	310 days	Indian National Congress (R)	Indira II	Indira Gandhi
	K. R. Ganesh (1922–2004); MP for Andaman and Nicobar Islands	18 March 1971	2 May 1971	310 days	Indian National Congress (R)	Indira III	Indira Gandhi
	Sushila Rohatgi (1921–1911); MP for Bilhaur	2 May 1971	24 March 1977	5 years, 326 days	Indian National Congress (R)	Indira III	Indira Gandhi
	Maganbhai Barot (1927–2011); MP for Ahmedabad	8 June 1980	15 January 1982	1 year, 221 days	Indian National Congress (I)	Indira IV	Indira Gandhi
	Janardhana Poojary (born 1937); MP for Mangalore (Banking and Insurance)	15 January 1982	31 October 1984	2 years, 290 days	Indian National Congress (I)	Indira IV	Indira Gandhi
	Janardhana Poojary (born 1937); MP for Mangalore (Banking and Insurance)	31 October 1984	31 December 1984	2 years, 290 days	Indian National Congress (I)	Rajiv I	Rajiv Gandhi
	Anil Shastri; MP for Varanasi	23 April 1990	10 November 1990	201 days	Janata Dal	Vishwanath	Vishwanath Pratap Singh
	Digvijay Singh (1955–2010); Rajya Sabha MP for Bihar	21 November 1990	21 June 1991	212 days	Samajwadi Janata Party (Rashtriya)	Chandra Shekhar	Chandra Shekhar

== List by length of tenure ==
=== Cabinet Ministers ===
No.	Name of Minister	Party	Term	Length of term	
No.	Name of Minister	Party	Term	Longest continuous duration	Total duration of ministership
1	P. Chidambaram	TMC/INC	4	4 years, 191 days	8 years, 41 days
2	Morarji Desai	INC/JP	5	4 years, 48 days	7 years, 338 days
3	Nirmala Sitharaman	BJP	2	7 years, 173 days	7 years, 173 days
4	Pranab Mukherjee	INC	4	3 years, 34 days	6 years, 137 days
5	C. D. Deshmukh	INC	2	6 years, 53 days	6 years, 53 days
6	Manmohan Singh	INC	3	4 years, 330 days	5 years, 55 days
7	Yashwant Sinha	SJP(R)/BJP	3	2 years, 262 days	4 years, 317 days
8	Arun Jaitley	BJP	3	3 years, 352 days	4 years, 244 days
9	Yashwantrao Chavan	INC(R)	2	3 years, 211 days	4 years, 105 days
10	T. T. Krishnamachari	INC	5	1 years, 205 days	3 years, 290 days
11	Chidambaram Subramaniam	INC(R)	1	2 years, 165 days	2 years, 165 days
12	V. P. Singh	INC(I)/JD	2	2 years, 24 days	2 years, 27 days
13	Ramaswamy Venkataraman	INC(I)	1	2 years, 1 day	2 years, 1 day
14	Jaswant Singh	BJP	2	1 years, 325 days	1 year, 341 days
15	Hirubhai M. Patel	JP	1	1 years, 304 days	1 years, 304 days
16	John Matthai	INC	1	1 years, 252 days	1 years, 252 days
17	Shankarrao Chavan	INC(I)	1	1 years, 160 days	1 years, 160 days
18	Sachindra Chaudhuri	INC	3	1 years, 47 days	1 year, 70 days
19	R. K. Shanmukham Chetty	INC	1	1 years, 2 days	1 years, 2 days
20	Indira Gandhi	INC(R)	1	0 years, 346 days	0 years, 346 days
21	Madhu Dandavate	JD	1	0 years, 339 days	0 years, 339 days
22	N. D. Tiwari	INC(I)	1	0 years, 336 days	0 years, 336 days
23	Charan Singh	JP/JP(S)	2	0 years, 173 days	0 years, 260 days
24	Rajiv Gandhi	INC(I)	1	0 years, 182 days	0 years, 182 days
25	Piyush Goyal	BJP	2	0 years, 101 days	0 years, 124 days
26	Hemwati Nandan Bahuguna	JP(S)	1	0 years, 83 days	0 years, 83 days
27	Jawaharlal Nehru	INC	1	0 years, 37 days	0 years, 37 days
28	Kshitish Chandra Neogy	INC	1	0 years, 35 days	0 years, 35 days
29	Chandra Shekhar	SJP(R)	1	0 years, 11 days	0 years, 11 days
30	Inder Kumar Gujral	JD	1	0 years, 10 days	0 years, 10 days
