= Skore (brand) =

Indian condom brand

Skore condoms
- Current owner: TTK Group
- Country: India
- Introduced: 2012; 14 years ago
- Website: skorecondoms.com

Skore condoms is India's second largest condom brand. Launched in 2012, Skore is manufactured by TTK Group.

== History and marketing ==
After losing brands Kohinoor and Durex, TTK Group launched Skore condoms. With branding and marketing support from McCann, Skore was positioned as a pre-marital pleasure enhancer. This campaign was named one of ten most successful launches in Nielsen's 2016 evaluation of 16,000 brand launches in India. Skore went from being a ₹40 crore brand in 2013 to a ₹70 crore brand in 2015.

In 2014, Skore launched a mobile app to help locate pharmacies in a city and order them discretely. By 2015, Skore was the third largest condom brand in India, and by 2018, it became the second largest condom brand in the country. In 2016, Skore roped in West Indies cricketers Dwayne Bravo and Chris Gayle as brand ambassadors. In 2019, Skore ventured into other products of sexual wellness including lubricant gels, vibrating penis rings, and pheromone spray.
