= Indian Academy of Highway Engineers =

Government research institute in Noida, India

Indian Academy of Highway Engineers भारतीय राजमार्ग अभियंता अकादमी
- Founders: Ministry of Road Transport and Highways (Government of India)
- Established: 1983; 43 years ago
- President: Minister of Road Transport and Highways
- Director: Er. Sanjeev Kumar
- Location: Sector-62, Noida, Uttar Pradesh
- Website: www.iahe.org.in

The Indian Academy of Highway Engineers (IAHE) is a training academy under the administrative control of the Ministry of Road Transport and Highways, Government of India. A collaborative body of the Central and State Governments, IAHE was set up in 1983 with the primary objective of fulfilling the long-standing need for training of Highway Engineers at the entry level and during the service at all levels.

== History ==
IAHE was originally registered as "Highway Training Institute" with the Registrar of Firms and Societies, Punjab, Chandigarh under the Societies Registration (Act XXI of 1860) and as amended by Punjab Amendment Act, 1957 as on 18 January 1983.

IAHE has been operationalized since April 1985 in a rented accommodation at Jor Bagh, New Delhi in the name of National Institute for Training of Highway Engineers (NITHE) till September 2001 and thereafter shifted to its own campus developed on 10 acres of land at Sector-62, Noida, Uttar Pradesh w.e.f. 01 October 2001.

== List of Directors ==
The list of Directors of Indian Academy of Highway Engineers (IAHE) is as follows:
