= Desai ministry =

1977–1979 Indian government

Morarji Desai ministry
- 9th Ministry of the Republic of India

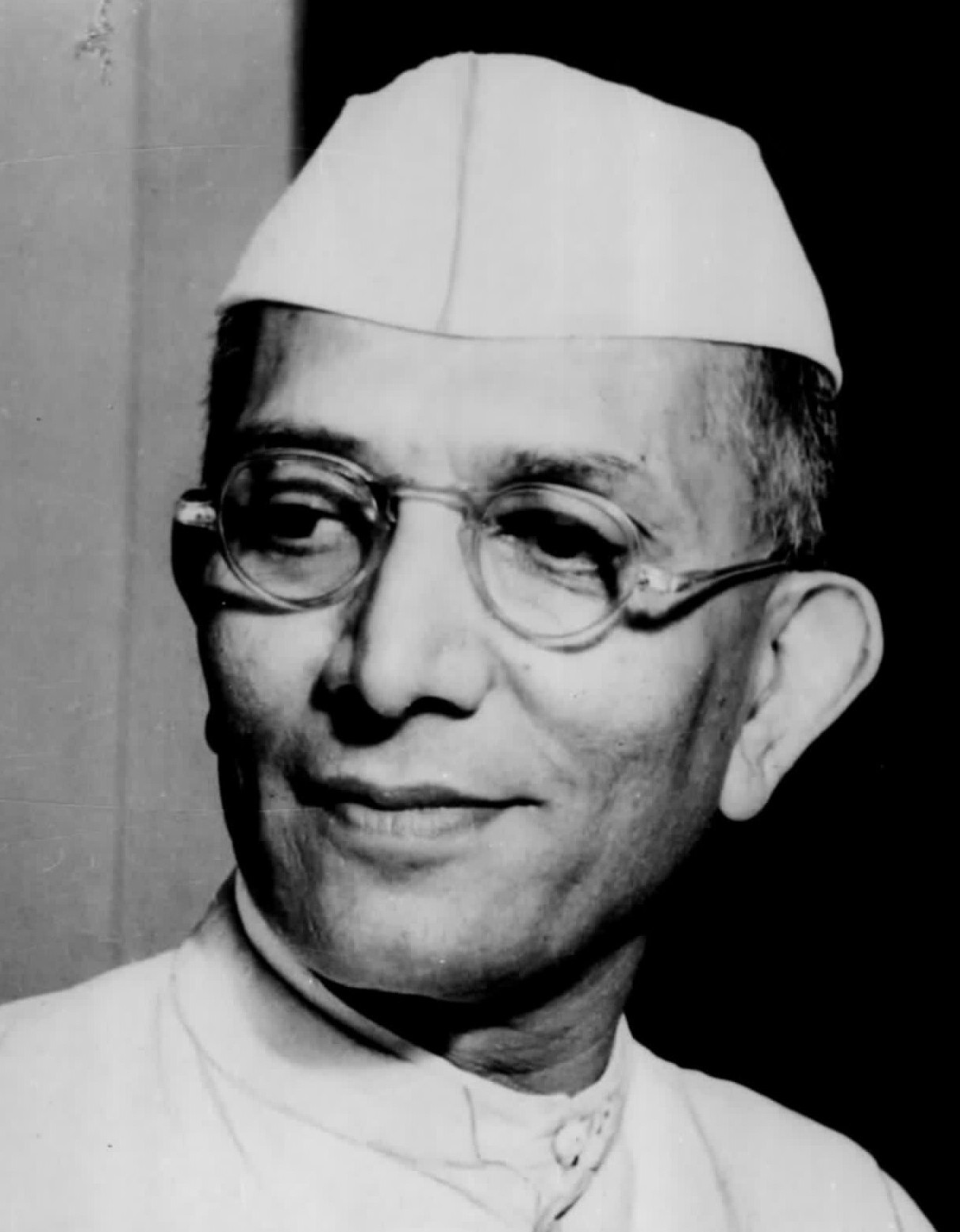
- Date formed: 24 March 1977
- Date dissolved: 28 July 1979

People and organisations
- Head of state: (Note: Basappa Danappa Jatti (Acting) (until 25 July 1977)); Neelam Sanjiva Reddy (from 25 July 1977)
- Head of government: Morarji Desai
- Member party: Janata Party (Janata alliance)
- Status in legislature: Majority
- Opposition party: Indian National Congress (Congress Alliance)
- Opposition leader: Yashwantrao Chavan (1 July 1977 – 11 April 1978; from 10 July 1979); C. M. Stephen (12 April 1978 – 9 July 1979) (Lok Sabha) (In Lok Sabha); Kamalapati Tripathi (In Rajya Sabha) (30 March 1975-15 February 1978& from 23 March 1978)Bhola Paswan Shastri (24 February 1978-23 March 1978)

History
- Election: 1977
- Outgoing election: 1980
- Legislature terms: 2 years, 4 months and 4 days
- Predecessor: Third Indira Gandhi ministry
- Successor: Charan Singh ministry

The Morarji Desai ministry was formed on 24 March 1977 following the 1977 Indian general election. Morarji Desai led the Janata Party to victory against the Congress party. Upon taking office, Morarji Desai became the first Indian Prime Minister not belonging to the Congress party.

== Cabinet ==
Portfolio	Minister	Took office	Left office	Party	Remarks
Prime Minister; And also in-charge of all other important portfolios and policy issues not allocated to any Minister.	Morarji Desai	24 March 1977	28 July 1979	JP	
Deputy Prime Ministers	Charan Singh	24 January 1979	16 July 1979	JP	
Deputy Prime Ministers	Jagjivan Ram	24 January 1979	28 July 1979	JP	
Minister of Shipping and Transport	Morarji Desai	24 March 1977	14 August 1977	JP	Prime Minister was responsible.
Minister of Home Affairs	Charan Singh	26 March 1977	1 July 1978	JP	
Minister of Home Affairs	Morarji Desai	1 July 1978	24 January 1979	JP	Prime Minister was responsible.
Minister of Home Affairs	Hirubhai M. Patel	29 January 1979	28 July 1979	JP	
Minister of Finance	Hirubhai M. Patel	26 March 1977	24 January 1979	JP	
Minister of Finance	Charan Singh	24 January 1979	16 July 1979	JP	
Minister of Defence	Jagjivan Ram	28 March 1977	28 July 1979	JP	
Minister of External Affairs	Atal Bihari Vajpayee	26 March 1977	28 July 1979	JP	
Minister of Information and Broadcasting	L. K. Advani	26 March 1977	28 July 1979	JP	
Minister of Education, Social Welfare and Culture	Pratap Chandra Chunder	26 March 1977	28 July 1979	JP	
Minister of Education and Social Welfare	Rabi Ray	25 January 1979	15 July 1979	JP	
Minister of Railways	Madhu Dandavate	26 March 1977	28 July 1979	JP	
Minister of Commerce; Minister of Civil Supplies and Cooperation	Mohan Dharia	26 March 1977	28 July 1979	JP	
Minister of Energy	P. Ramachandran	26 March 1977	28 July 1979	JP	
Minister of Law, Justice and Company Affairs	Shanti Bhushan	26 March 1977	28 July 1979	JP	
Minister of Works, Housing, Supply and Rehabilition	Sikander Bakht	26 March 1977	28 July 1979	JP	
Minister of Parliamentary Affairs; Minister of Labour	Ravindra Varma	26 March 1977	28 July 1979	JP	
Minister of Steel and Mines	Biju Patnaik	26 March 1977	15 July 1979	JP	
Minister of Communications	Parkash Singh Badal	26 March 1977	27 March 1977	SAD	
Minister of Communications	George Fernandes	27 March 1977	6 July 1977	JP	
Minister of Communications	Brij Lal Verma	6 July 1977	28 July 1979	JP	
Minister of Tourism and Civil Aviation	Purushottam Kaushik	26 March 1977	15 July 1979	JP	
Minister of Agriculture and Irrigation	Parkash Singh Badal	28 March 1977	17 June 1977	SAD	
Minister of Agriculture and Irrigation	Surjit Singh Barnala	18 June 1977	28 July 1979	SAD	
Minister of Health and Family Welfare	Raj Narain	28 March 1977	1 July 1978	JP	
Minister of Health and Family Welfare	Morarji Desai	1 July 1978	24 January 1979	JP	Prime Minister was responsible.
Minister of Industry	Brij Lal Verma	28 March 1977	6 July 1977	JP	
Minister of Industry	George Fernandes	6 July 1977	15 July 1979	JP	
Minister of Chemicals and Fertilizers	Hemwati Nandan Bahuguna	28 March 1977	29 March 1977	JP	Renamed as Petroleum, Chemicals and Fertilizers.
Minister of Petroleum, Chemicals and Fertilizers	Hemwati Nandan Bahuguna	29 March 1977	15 July 1979	JP	

== See also ==
- Premiership of Morarji Desai
