= Sunder Prakasham =

Indian entrepreneur (born 1972)

- Born: October 14, 1972 (age 53); Tamil Nadu, India
- Education: Bharathiar University
- Occupation: Entrepreneur
- Known for: CEO of TTK Services
- Website: www.ttkservices.com

Sunder Prakasham (born 14 October 1972) is an Indian entrepreneur who is the CEO of TTK Services and the Managing Director of HomeShikari.

== Early life and education ==
Sunder was born into a South Indian family on the 14 October 1972. His father was a clerk in the railways, and his mother was a teacher. Sunder obtained a bachelor's degree in Computer science Engineering, following which, he obtained his Masters of Business Administration degree from Bharathiar University, Tamil Nadu in India.

== Career ==
Sunder began his career with an IT company in Chennai. After a 4-year stint, he quit his job to work on his start-up, a ‘scanmail’ service, run by him and his friends. From the year 2004, he spearheaded the formation of TTK Services Pvt. Ltd and led its three divisions’ viz., YourManInIndia, GetFriday and HomeShikari.
