= TTK Prestige =

Indian home appliance manufacturer

- Formerly: TT Private Limited (1955-1988); TT Limited (1988-1994)
- Type: Public
- Traded as: BSE: 517506; NSE: TTKPRESTIG
- Founded: 1955
- Founder: T T Krishnamachari
- Headquarters: M G Road, Chennai, India
- Key people: T. T. Jagannathan (Executive Chairman); Chandru Kalro (Managing Director)
- Products: Kitchen and Home Appliances
- Brands: Prestige; Judge
- Revenue: ▲₹2,194.20 crore (US$230 million) (2021)
- Net income: ▲₹254.20 crore (US$26 million) (2021)
- Parent: TTK Group
- Subsidiaries: Horwood Homewares; Ultra Fresh
- Website: www.ttkprestige.com

TTK Prestige Limited is an Indian company that manufactures kitchen appliances and cookware, under the "Prestige" and "Judge" brand. The company is best known for its pressure cookers.

== Company history ==
TTK Prestige was incorporated as a private limited company on October 22, 1955, in Madras (now Chennai) under the name TT Private Limited. It began manufacture of pressure cookers in 1959 with technical collaboration from Prestige Group of the United Kingdom. The company went public in 1994, and changed to its present name the same year. It is known for its innovative marketing strategy, be it distributing pamphlets by a helicopter in the fifties or introducing the exchange scheme.

== Awards ==
- Power Brand Award
