= Zulfiquarulla =

Indian businessman and politician

Minister of Communications and Muslim Waqfs
- In office 28 July 1979 – 14 January 1980
- Prime Minister: Charan Singh
- Preceded by: V. V. Giri
- Succeeded by: Bhishma Narain Singh

Personal details
- Born: 1 January 1903 Moradabad, United Provinces of Agra and Oudh, British India (now in Uttar Pradesh)
- Died: 17 January 1997 (aged 94) Allahabad, Uttar Pradesh, India
- Party: Janata Party (Secular)

Zulfiquarulla (1 January 1903 – 17 January 1997) was an Indian businessman and politician who served as Union Minister of Communications and Muslim Waqfs in the Charan Singh ministry from July 1979 to January 1980, and as Minister of State (Finance) from August 1977 to July 1979. He was a member of the 6th Lok Sabha as the MP from Sultanpur from 1977 to 1979.

== Biography ==
Zulfiquarulla was educated at the Muhammadan Anglo-Oriental College, later Aligarh Muslim University, and at the Jamia Millia Islamia. He served as a municipal commissioner for Allahabad from 1930 to 1956 and as the Chairman of the city's municipal board during 1944–1945. From 1960 to 1966, he was Corporator of the Allahabad Corporation, serving as Mayor of Allahabad in 1962–1963.
