= Bibudhendra Mishra =

Indian politician (1928–2012)

Member of parliament, 3rd Lok Sabha
- In office 1962–1967
- Preceded by: Chintamani Panigrahi
- Succeeded by: Rabi Ray
- Constituency: Puri, Odisha

Member of parliament, Rajya Sabha
- In office 1958–1962
- Constituency: Odisha

Personal details
- Born: 30 December 1928 Puri, Odisha, British India
- Died: 15 February 2012
- Party: Indian National Congress
- Spouse: Uma Mishra

Bibudhendra Mishra also spelt Misra (30 December 1928 - 15 February 2012) was an Indian politician. He was elected to the Lok Sabha, the lower house of the Parliament of India from Puri, Odisha and was member of the Rajya Sabha, the upper house of the Parliament of India representing Odisha as a member of the Indian National Congress.
