= Sachindra Chaudhuri =

Indian politician and lawyer

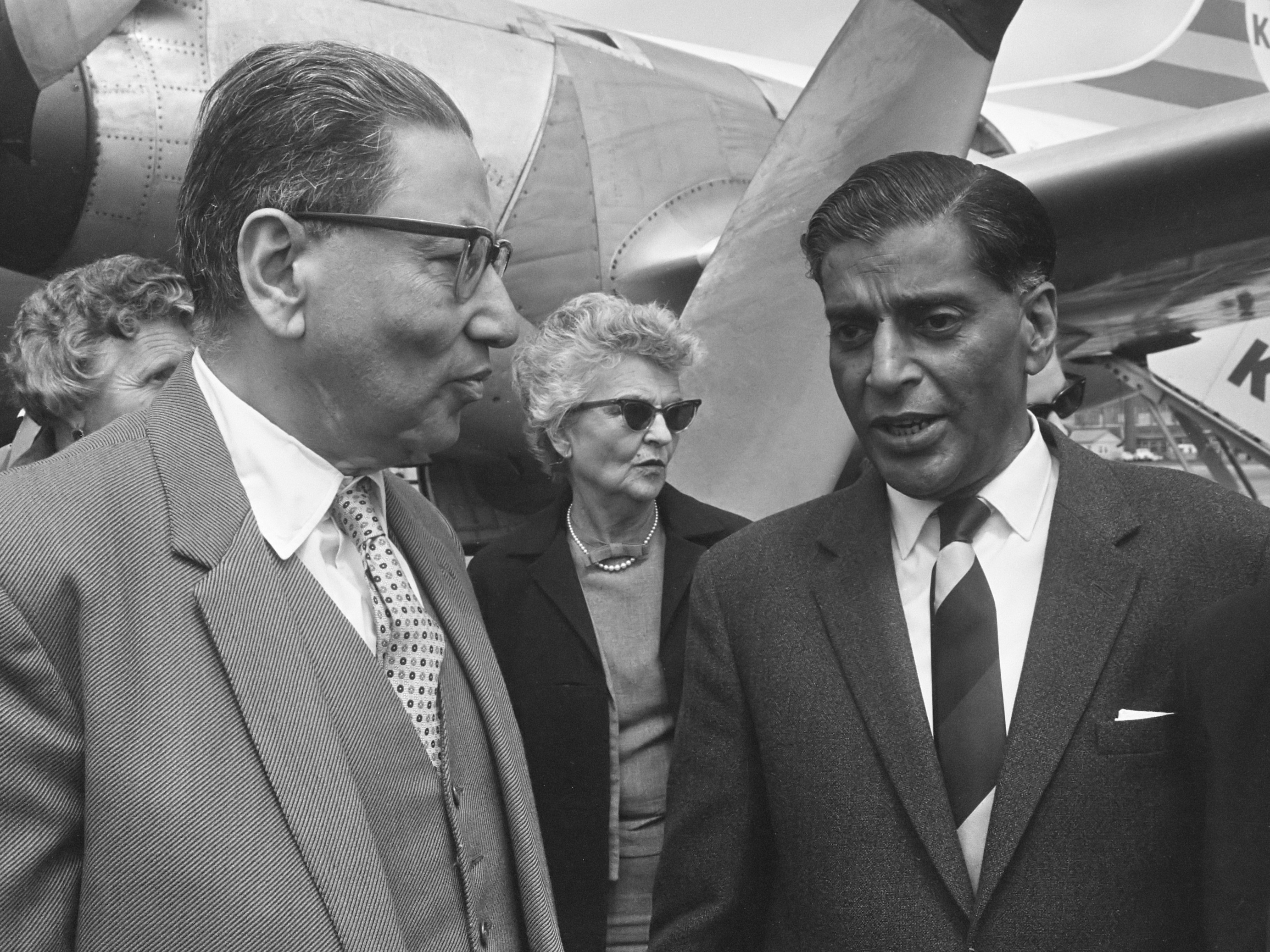
Chaudhuri (in left) talking to the Indian ambassador in the Netherlands Rajkumar Raghunath Sinha, 1966.

Sachindra Chaudhuri (24 February 1903 – 12 June 1992) was an Indian lawyer and politician who was Minister of Finance of the Government of India from 1965 to 13 March 1967, under Lal Bahadur Shastri and Indira Gandhi. He also was Director of several companies, member of Central Board of State Bank of India, member of Law Commission and member of Indian delegation to General Assembly of the United Nations.

== Political career ==
Sachindra Chaudhuri was member of Indian Parliament for Ghatal constituency. He was Minister of Finance of India. During his term, Indian economy went into a 2-year recession for the first time since Independence. Real GDP growth fell by 3% in 1965 and 1% in 1966. Consequently, the Rupee was devalued for the first time.

== Personal life ==
Sachindra Chaudhuri was born on 24 February 1903, in Calcutta. His father was Prabhodh Chandra Chaudhuri. He educated at Rani Bhabani School in Calcutta, later he studied at Presidency College in Calcutta and later at Fitzwilliam College, Cambridge. He also was at Lincoln's Inn. He married Seeta Mitter on 11 December 1930. He had two sons and two daughters.

His family originally belongs to the renowned Zamindar house called "Baksha Chowdhury Bati" at a place called Baksha, Hooghly, West Bengal (nearest railway station is Janai Road)and "Baksha Chowdhury Bati" is famous for its Dol Utsav(festival of colour) and Durgapuja more than 400 years old.

He died on 12 June 1992 after a long illness.
