= T. T. Krishnamachari =

Indian politician and Industrialist

Thiruvellore Thattai Krishnamachari
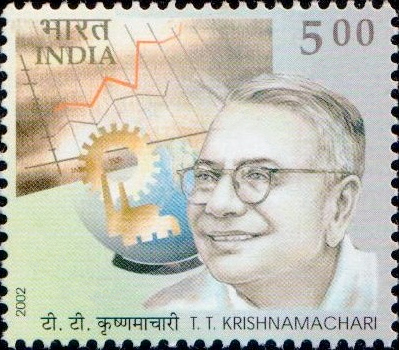
- Krishnamachari in 2002 stamp of India

6th Minister of Finance
- In office 31 August 1963 – 31 December 1965
- Prime Minister: Jawaharlal Nehru; Gulzarilal Nanda; Lal Bahadur Shastri
- Preceded by: Morarji Desai
- Succeeded by: Sachindra Chaudhuri
- Constituency: Tiruchendur
- In office 30 August 1956 – 13 February 1958
- Prime Minister: Jawaharlal Nehru
- Preceded by: Jawaharlal Nehru
- Succeeded by: Morarji Desai
- Constituency: Madras; Madras South

Member of Parliament, Lok Sabha
- In office 1962–1967
- Prime Minister: Jawaharlal Nehru
- Preceded by: T. Ganapathy
- Succeeded by: Santhosam
- Constituency: Tiruchendur
- In office 1957–1962
- Prime Minister: Jawaharlal Nehru
- Preceded by: Constituency established
- Succeeded by: K. Manoharan
- Constituency: Madras South
- In office 1952–1957
- Prime Minister: Jawaharlal Nehru
- Preceded by: Office established
- Succeeded by: Constituency abolished
- Constituency: Madras

Personal details
- Born: 26 November 1899 Madras, British Raj
- Died: 7 March 1974 (aged 74)
- Party: Indian National Congress
- Children: TT Rangasamy; TT Narasimman; TT Raghavan; TT Vasu
- Parent: T. T. Rangachari (father)
- Profession: Politician, Entrepreneur TTK group

Tiruvellore Thattai Krishnamachari (26 November 1899 – 7 March 1974) was an Indian politician who served as Finance Minister from 1956 to 1958 and from 1964 to 1966. He was also a founding member of the first governing body of the National Council of Applied Economic Research (NCAER) in New Delhi, India's first independent economic policy institute established in 1956.

Krishnamachari graduated from Madras Christian College (MCC) and was a visiting professor to the department of economics at MCC. He was popularly known as TTK.

He has the ignominy of being the first minister in free India to have resigned due to his involvement in a scam. He was also a member of drafting committee, an entrepreneur and prominent leader within the Indian National Congress. He was also deputy viceroy from 1947-1950.

== Early life ==
T. T. Krishnamachari was born during the British Raj in 1899 into a Tamil Brahmin family in the city of Madras (now Chennai). His father T. T. Rangachari was a judge in the High Court. He attended the Dharmamurthi Rao Bahadur Calavala Cunnan Chetty's Hindu Higher Secondary School, and later graduated from Madras Christian College. He founded TTK group, an Indian business conglomerate famous for its Prestige brand, in the year 1928.

== Political life ==
T.T. Krishnamachari was initially elected to the Madras Legislative Assembly as an independent member, and later joined the Congress. In 1946, he was made a member of the Constituent Assembly at the Centre. From 1952 to 1965, he served the country twice as a Central Minister. He was the first minister for Commerce and Industry and also served as finance minister for 2 times. He also remained in charge of the Steel Ministry for quite some time. He became a Minister again in 1962, first without portfolio, then the Minister for Economic and Defense Cooperation and finally the finance Minister again, in 1964 and finally retired in 1966.

== Later life ==
Krishnamachari was forced to resign from the post of Finance Minister on 18 February 1958 because of his involvement into the Haridas Mundhra scandal. He was re-elected in 1962 and Jawaharlal Nehru had offered him any cabinet position except that of the Finance ministry but was rehabilitated in 1962 as cabinet minister without a post and again as the finance minister a position that he held until 1966. He was associated with Madras Music Academy. The main music hall in the Madras Music Academy bears his name. He died in 1974 due to age related illness.

Mowbray's Road in Chennai was renamed as TTK Road after his death.

Assembly seats
| Preceded by | Member of Madras Legislative Assembly; 1937–1939 | Succeeded by |
| Preceded by | Member of Central Legislative Assembly; 1942–1946 | Succeeded by |
| Preceded by | Member of Constituent Assembly of India from Madras; 1946–1952 | Succeeded by |
Lok Sabha
| Preceded by Office established | Member of Parliament for Madras; 1952–1957 | Succeeded by Constituency abolished |
| Preceded by Constituency established | Member of Parliament for Madras South; 1957–1962 | Succeeded by K. Manoharan |
| Preceded by T. Ganapathy | Member of Parliament for Tiruchendur; 1962–1967 | Succeeded by Santhosam |
Political offices
| Preceded by Chintamanrao Deshmukh | Finance Minister of India; 1957–1958 | Succeeded by Jawaharlal Nehru |
| Preceded by Morarji Desai | Finance Minister of India; 1964–1965 | Succeeded by Sachindra Chaudhuri |
