= Brij Lal Varma =

Indian politician (1916–1967)

Minister of Communications
- In office 6 July 1977 – 29 July 1979
- Prime Minister: Morarji Desai
- Preceded by: George Fernandes
- Succeeded by: Charan Singh

Minister of Industry
- In office 28 March 1977 – 6 July 1977
- Prime Minister: Morarji Desai
- Preceded by: T. A. Pai
- Succeeded by: George Fernandes

Member of Parliament, Lok Sabha
- In office 1977–1980
- Preceded by: Krishna Agrawal
- Succeeded by: Vidya Charan Shukla
- Constituency: Mahasamund

Personal details
- Born: 1916 Raipur district, Central Provinces, British Raj (now in Chhattisgarh, India)
- Died: 19 July 1987 (aged 70–71) Ahmedabad, Gujarat, India
- Party: Bharatiya Jan Sangh
- Education: University of Nagpur

Brijlal Verma (1916 – 19 July 1987) was a cabinet minister in Morarji Desai ministry in India. He held communication portfolio from 1977 to 1979 . He was elected to Lok Sabha from Mahasamund on a Janata Party ticket.

He died in 1987.
