= Ahmed Mohiuddin (politician) =

Indian politician

- Ahmed Mohiuddin (year unknown)

Member of Parliament, Lok Sabha
- In office 1952–1962
- Constituency: Secunderabad, Lok Sabha constituency

Personal details
- Born: 10 October 1898 Nizam's Hyderabad State, British India. (Present Day Telangana India)
- Party: Indian National Congress
- Spouse: Aisha Sultana
- Children: 3

Ahmed Mohiuddin (born 10 October 1898, date of death unknown) was an Indian politician and the Member of parliament from 1952 to 1962 from the Secunderabad, Lok Sabha constituency of Hyderabad State. He was elected twice during the first Lok Sabha and the second Lok Sabha elections which were the India's first and the second general elections held in 1951 and 1957 after the Independence.

If I mistake not he died in 5th Jan 1966 at willingdon Hospital, New Delhi. One Mr..Ahmed Mohiuddin died on this date - not sure if same gentleman.

== Education ==
Mohiuddin was born on 10 October 1898 in Hyderabad city of Andhra Pradesh. He did his Bachelor of Arts from the University of Cambridge, also abbreviated as "B. A. (Cantab)". Besides completing his B.A from England, he also studied at the Aligarh Muslim University in Uttar Pradesh.

== Career ==
Mohiuddin was originally a retired government servant and the member of Indian Institute of Economics unit Hyderabad. He served in the Nation Building Department and Professor of Economics, at Nizam College, Hyderabad from 1927 to 1930. He also served as the Member-secretary in Banking Inquiry Committee, 1929, Co-operative Finance Inquiry Committee, and Director at the Commerce and Industry unit Hyderabad from 1938 to 1943. Appointed by Congress in 1939, he represented his hometown on the National Planning Committee. Besides serving in several departments with different positions, He served in Hyderabad State Bank and later as Secretary at Labour department from 1949 to 1950.

Mohiuddin was elected Member of parliament of the First Lok Sabha (1952–57) and then was re-elected in the Second Lok Sabha elections (1957–1962). During his political career, he served as the Deputy Minister of Civil Aviation from 1958 to 1962 and then was Deputy Minister of Transport and Communications starting in 1962.

== Personal life ==
Mohiuddin was married to Aisha Sultana, with whom he had one daughter and two sons.
