= Bhakt Darshan =

Indian politician

Bhakt Darshan (1912–1991) served Garhwal as Member of Parliament in the 1st, 2nd, 3rd, and 4th Lok Sabha (India) as well as being a Deputy Minister and Minister of State in the governments of Lal Bahadur Shastri and Indira Gandhi. He was also a writer, being founder-editor of a Hindi weekly and writing for other publications.

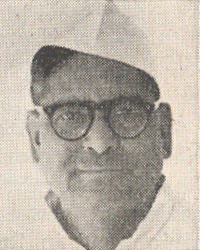
Bhakt Darshan

== Member of Parliament ==
In 1952, Darshan was elected the Member of Parliament from Garhwal (Lok Sabha constituency), Uttar Pradesh, in the first general elections of independent India. He represented that constituency for four consecutive parliaments, between 1952–1970, before resigning in 1971. The cause of his resignation was a split in his party, the Indian National Congress, caused by an ideological dispute between factions headed by Indira Gandhi on the one hand and people such as Morarji Desai on the other. Darshan did not want to take sides and so left to lead a private life in Dehradun.

== Union Minister ==
As a Union Minister during 1963-1971 he held various portfolios. He was Deputy Minister for Education in the cabinets of Jawaharlal Nehru and Lal Bahadur Shastri, and was later Minister of State for Transport and Minister of State for Education in Indira Gandhi's cabinet. He was the first Chairman of the Kendriya Vidyalaya Sangathan (Central School Organization).

Darshan took keen interest in the development of Garhwal, especially in the matters of education and general welfare and upliftment of the poor and was associated with several organizations connected with the development of the region.

He was involved in the promotion of Hindi, he served as Deputy Chairman Hindi Sansthan Uttar Pradesh; Vice Chancellor Kanpur University; Deputy Chairman Uttar Pradesh Khadi and Gram Udiyog Board, and was intimately connected with various social and cultural organizations. He also organised the Kasturba Gandhi National Memorial Fund. He worked relentlessly for the welfare of ex- servicemen and serving soldiers and also established Azad Hind Fauj Relief Fund.

A promoter of healthy journalism. he was founder-editor of 'Karma Bhumi' a Hindi weekly. He wrote two publications, Suman Smriti Granth and Garhwal Ki Divangat Vibhutiyan.

Bhakt Darshan died on 30 April 1991 at the age of 79.
