= China Study Group =

Indian government advisory group

The China Study Group (CSG) of the Government of India is an informal official group set up for advising the government on its China policy. It is a confidential body made up of inter-ministerial secretary-level officials. (Note: Not to be confused with the formation of the 1969 China Study Group, "comprising an informal group of scholars from universities and think-tanks". The group was responsible for India's first China journal, China Report. The group expanded into the Institute of Chinese Studies. Giri Deshingkar was one of the founders.) Set up by the Cabinet Committee on Political Affairs under the Indira Gandhi government in November 1975, it was first headed by diplomat K.R. Narayanan (later President of India). It has been under the charge of civil servants such as Brajesh Mishra and Ajit Doval.

== History ==
Shivshankar Menon wrote in his book "Choices":

In 1976, on the basis of the much better information regarding the border available to India, the Cabinet Committee for Political Affairs established the China Study Group under the foreign secretary to recommend revised patrolling limits, rules of engagement, and the pattern of Indian presence along the border with China

China Study Group has a key structural role in the ongoing 2020 China–India skirmishes.

Patrolling Points (PPs) for Indian troops along the China–India border were defined by the China Study Group in the 1970s.

== Members ==
In 2020, the CSG was headed by National Security Advisor Ajit Doval. CSG members include:

- Cabinet Secretary
- Foreign Secretary
- Home Secretary
- Defence Secretary
- Vice Chief of the Army Staff
- Vice Chief of the Naval Staff
- Vice Chief of the Air Staff
- Director of the Intelligence Bureau
- Director of R&AW
