= Terash Gowalla =

Indian politician (born 1974)

Member of Parliament, Rajya Sabha
- Incumbent
- Assumed office 10 April 2026
- Preceded by: Rameswar Teli
- Constituency: Assam

Member of Assam Legislative Assembly
- In office 2016–2026
- Preceded by: Amiya Gogoi
- Succeeded by: TBA
- Constituency: Duliajan

Personal details
- Born: 24 May 1974 Borguri, Assam, India
- Party: Bharatiya Janata Party
- Occupation: Politician; social worker

Terash Gowalla (born 24 May 1974) is an Indian politician from Assam belonging to the Bharatiya Janata Party. He is currently an MP in the upper chamber of the Indian Parliament, the Rajya Sabha and was previously elected to Assam Legislative Assembly in the 2016 and 2021 elections from Duliajan constituency.
