= Duliajan Oil Town =

Duliajan Oil City
- City
- Nickname: Duliajan
- Location in Assam, India Duliajan Oil City (India)
- Coordinates: 27°21′42″N 95°19′6″E
- Country: India
- State: Assam
- District: Dibrugarh

Population (2001)
  - Total: 21,707
  - Rank: 16th in Assam

Languages
  - Official: Assamese
- Time zone: UTC+5:30 (IST)
- Vehicle registration: AS

Duliajan Oil City is a census town in Dibrugarh district in the state of Assam, India. It is the headquarters of Oil India Limited, a PSU undertaking of crude petroleum and Oil industry.

== Demographics ==
As of 2001 India census, Duliajan Oil Town had a population of 21,707. Males constitute 53% of the population and females 47%. Duliajan Oil Town has an average literacy rate of 84%, higher than the national average of 59.5%: male literacy is 87% and, female literacy is 80%. In Duliajan Oil Town, 10% of the population is under 6 years of age.
