= Bill (law) =

Proposed law

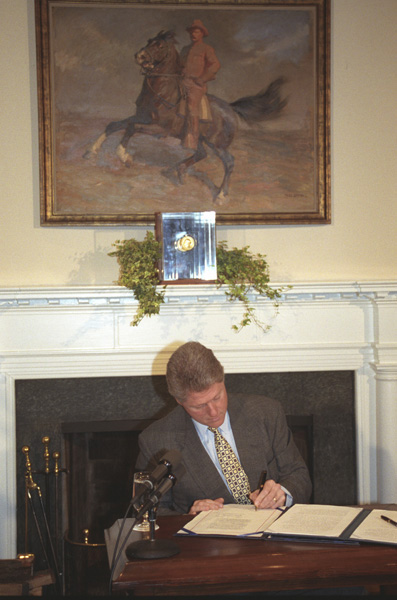
U.S. president Bill Clinton signing a bill passed by the U.S. Congress

A bill is a proposal for a new law, or a proposal to substantially alter an existing law.

A bill does not become law until it has been passed by the legislature and, in most cases, approved by the head of state (sometimes the executive).

Bills are introduced in the legislature and are there discussed, debated on, and voted upon. Once a bill has been enacted into law by the legislature, it is called an act of the legislature, or a statute.

== Usage ==
The word bill is mainly used in English-speaking nations formerly part of the British Empire whose legal systems originated in the common law of the United Kingdom, including the United States. The parts of a bill are known as clauses, until it has become an act of parliament, from which time the parts of the law are known as sections.

In nations that have civil law systems (including France, Belgium, Luxembourg, Spain and Portugal), a proposed law is known as a "law project" (French: projet de loi) if introduced by the government, or a "law proposition" (French: proposition de loi) if a private member's bill. Some legislatures do not make this terminological distinction (e.g. the Dutch parliament uses wetsontwerp and wetsvoorstel interchangeably).

In Canada, bills in the federal parliament are always bilingual. The term "projet de loi" is used for the French version, while "bill" is used for the English version.

== Preparation ==
Bills generally include titles, enacting provisions, statements of intent, definitions, substantive provisions, transitional clauses, and dates which the bill will be put into effect. The preparation of a bill may involve the production of a draft bill prior to the introduction of the bill into the legislature. In the United Kingdom, draft bills are frequently considered to be confidential. Pre-legislative scrutiny is a formal process carried out by a parliamentary committee on a draft bill.

In the Parliament of India, the draft bill is sent to the individual ministry relating to the matter. From there, the bill goes to the Ministry of Law and Justice and is then passed on to the Cabinet committee, which the prime minister heads.

Pre-legislative scrutiny is required in much of Scandinavia, occurs in Ireland at the discretion of the Oireachtas (parliament) and occurs in the UK at the government's discretion.

In the Parliament of Ireland, under Poynings' Law (1494–1782), legislation had to be pre-approved by the Privy Council of Ireland and Privy Council of England, so in practice each bill was substantively debated as "heads of a bill", then submitted to the privy councils for approval, and finally formally introduced as a bill and rejected or passed unamended.

== Introduction ==
In the Westminster system, where the executive is drawn from the legislature and usually holds a majority in the lower house, most bills are introduced by the executive (government bill). In principle, the legislature meets to consider the demands of the executive, as set out in the King's Speech or speech from the throne.

Mechanisms exist to allow other members of the legislature to introduce bills, but they are subject to strict timetables and usually fail unless a consensus is reached. In the US system, where the executive is formally separated from the legislature, all bills must originate from the legislature. Bills can be introduced using the following procedures:

- Leave: A motion is brought before the chamber asking that leave be given to bring in a bill. This is used in the British system in the form of the Ten Minute Rule motion. The legislator has 10 minutes to propose a bill, which can then be considered by the House on a day appointed for the purpose. While this rule remains in place in the rules of procedure of the US Congress, it is seldom used.
- Government motion: In jurisdictions where the executive can control legislative business a bill may be brought in by executive fiat.

== Legislative stages ==
Bills are generally considered through a number of readings. This refers to the historic practice of the clerical officers of the legislature reading the contents of a bill to the legislature. While the bill is no longer read, the motions on the bill still refer to this practice.

=== India ===
In India, for a law to be made it starts off as a bill and has to go through various stages:

1. There will be "first reading" of the bill where minister takes leave from the house and introduces title and objectives of the bill. Here, no discussion or voting takes place. And then the bill is published in Gazette of India.
2. After this there is a "second reading" of the bill, where the bill receives its final shape.
3. The bills first go through the 'stage of general discussion' where the bill is referred to select committee/joint committee for detailed scrutiny through a motion.
4. Under 'committee stage' the bill is scrutinized in detail in the committee and a report is submitted in the respective house.
5. Under 'consideration stage' the bill is discussed in detail in the house and is voted upon.
6. Then under "third reading" the bill is voted upon as a whole and if majority of the house present and voting favours the bill, then the bill is considered passed and is authenticated by presiding officer.
7. The bill is then passed to the other house for its consideration.
8. And if both houses agree, the bill reaches the president where he can assent, withhold assent, return for consideration and can also sit on the bill.

=== United Kingdom ===
In the United Kingdom, a proposed new law starts off as a bill that goes through seven stages of the legislative process: first reading, second reading, committee stage, report stage, third reading, opposite house, and royal assent. A bill is introduced by a member of Parliament (MP) in the House of Commons or by a member of the House of Lords.

There will be a first reading of the bill, in which the proposition in the bill is read out, but there is minimal discussion and no voting.

A second reading of the bill follows, in which the bill is presented in more detail and it is discussed between the MPs or Lords.

The third stage is the committee stage, in which a committee is gathered. This may include MPs, Lords, professionals and experts in the field, and other people who the bill may affect. The purpose of this stage is to go into more detail on the bill and gather expert opinions on it (e.g. teachers may be present in a committee about a bill that would affect the education system) and amendments may be brought.

After this is the report stage, in which the entire house reviews any and all changes made to the bill since its conception and may bring further amendments.

The fifth stage is the third reading of the bill, in which the full bill is read out in the house along with all amendments and is given final approval by the House.

The next stage is where the bill is handed over to the opposite house for approval. (If it started in the House of Commons it will be handed to the House of Lords and vice versa.) Here the bill will go through the same process as before, with amendments able to be brought. If amendments are brought, the bill will again be handed to the opposite house, going through the same process, which repeats until both houses arrive at an agreement on the bill. (In the rare circumstance that the two houses cannot agree, the House of Commons has the final say since it is an elected body, whereas the House of Lords is not).

Once the bill is finalised, it will move to the final stage, royal assent, when the monarch signs or otherwise signifies approval for the bill to become law. Theoretically, the monarch could refuse assent to a bill, but no monarch has done so since Queen Anne in 1708, and the royal veto has fallen into disuse. Once the assent is granted, the law comes into effect at the date and time specified within the act; if this is not specified within the act, it comes into effect at midnight on the same day it is granted royal assent.

== Enactment and after ==
Where a piece of primary legislation is termed an act, the process of a bill becoming law may be termed enactment. Once a bill is passed by the legislature, it may automatically become law, or it may need further approval, in which case enactment may be effected by the approver's signature or proclamation.

=== Approval ===
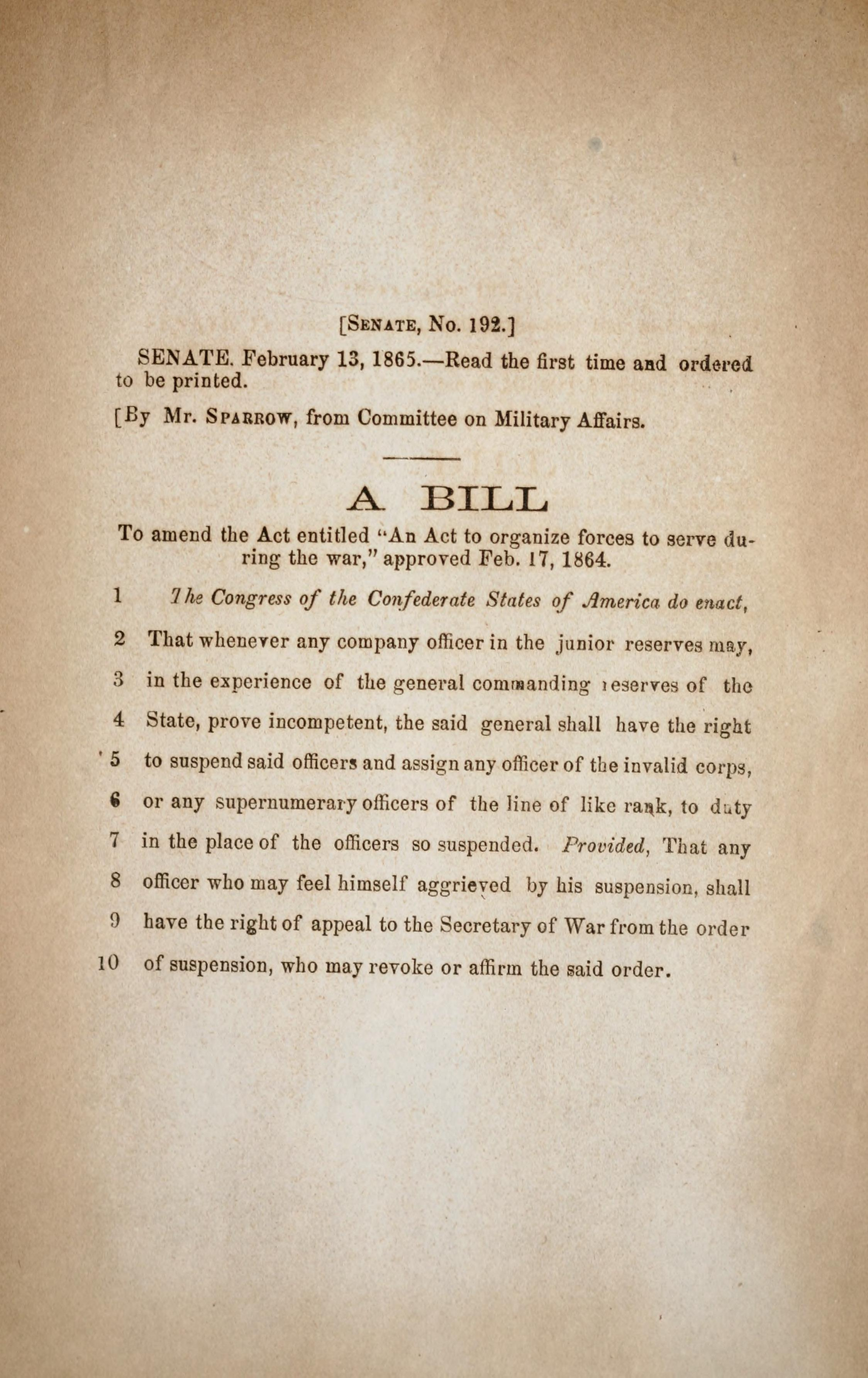
A bill to amend the act entitled "An act to organize forces to serve during the war", approved Feb. 17, 1864

Bills passed by the legislature usually require the approval of the head of state such as the monarch, president, or governor to become law. The refusal of such an approval is typically known as a veto.

Exceptions are the Irish Free State from the abolition of the governor-general in December 1936 to the creation of the office of president in December 1937, and Israel from its formation until today, during which period bills approved by the Oireachtas and Knesset respectively became/become law immediately (though, in Israel's case, the laws are ceremonially signed after their passage by the president).

In parliamentary systems, approval of the head of state is normally a formality since the head of state is a ceremonial figurehead. The exercise of the veto is considered a reserve power and is typically only used in rare circumstances, and the legislature can usually override the veto by a simple majority vote. However, in most cases, the executive – a cabinet of ministers responsible to parliament – takes a veto by the head of state into account.

In presidential systems, the head of state is also the chief executive, and the need to receive approval can be used as a political tool by them. The legislature is only able to override the veto by means of a supermajority vote in some countries such as Mexico, Kenya, and Argentina, while other presidential republics such as Brazil allow an override by merely a majority of the members of each House of Congress.

Some vetos held by some presidents allow them to disallow some particular clauses in the bill, while approving of others, as in France, and in some cases pertaining to expenditure bills, may allow the amounts for some line items to be reduced or eliminated, as is the case for most American state governors.

In some jurisdictions, a bill passed by the legislature may also involve review by a constitutional court. If the court finds the bill would violate the constitution it may annul it or send it back to the legislature for correction. In Ireland, the president has discretion under Article 26 of the Constitution to refer bills to the Supreme Court. In Germany, the Federal Constitutional Court has discretion to rule on bills.

Some bills may require approval by referendum. In Ireland this is obligatory for bills to amend the constitution; it is possible for other bills via a process that has never been used.

=== Afterwards ===
A bill may come into force as soon as it becomes law, or it may specify a later date to come into force, or it may specify by whom and how it may be brought into force; for example, by ministerial order. Different parts of an act may come into force at different times.

An act is typically promulgated by being published in an official gazette. This may be required on enactment, coming into force, or both.

== Numbering of bills ==
Legislatures may give bills numbers as they progress.

=== Australia ===
Bills are not given numbers in Australia and are typically cited by their short titles. They are only given an act number upon royal assent.

=== Brazil ===
In Brazil, bills originating in both the Senate and the Chamber of Deputies are numbered sequentially, prefixed with "PL" (Projeto de Lei) and optionally suffixed with the year they were proposed, separated by a slash, as in PL 1234/1988. Until 2019, each house used a different numbering and naming system, but the system was unified by a 2018 joint act by the secretaries of both houses.

Before the 2019 unification, the Senate numbered bills starting at the beginning of each year, while the lower house numbered bills starting at the beginning of each legislature. This meant that bills sent from one house to another could adopt two or more different names.

=== Canada ===
In the House of Commons of Canada, the pro forma bill is numbered C-1, Government Bills are numbered C-2 to C-200, numbered sequentially from the start of each parliamentary session, and Private member's bills are numbered C-201 to C-1000, numbered sequentially from the start of each Parliament.

The numbering system is identical in the Senate of Canada, except that bills first introduced in the Senate of Canada begin with "S" instead of "C".

=== Ireland ===
In the Irish Oireachtas, bills are numbered sequentially from the start of each calendar year. Bills originating in the Dáil and Seanad share a common sequence. There are separate sequences for public and private bills, the latter prefixed with "P". Although acts to amend the constitution are outside the annual sequence used for other public acts, bills to amend the constitution are within the annual sequence of public bills.

=== Philippines ===
In the Philippines, all bills passed into law, regardless of whether they were introduced in the House of Representatives or the Senate, are numbered sequentially beginning with the first Republic Act that became law on July 15, 1946. There have been 11,646 Republic Acts as of January 21, 2022. All laws passed by Congress, once given presidential assent, become law and are given a sequential number and are prefixed with "Republic Act" or "R.A." for short. They are also given a secondary sequential number by the chamber they are introduced in. Aforementioned numberings restart every three years after the formation of a new Congress.

=== United Kingdom ===
In the United Kingdom, for example, the Coroners and Justice Act in 2009 started as Bill 9 in the House of Commons. Then it became Bill 72 on consideration by a public bill committee; after that it became House of Lords Bill 33. Then it became House of Lords Bill 77, returned to the House of Commons as Bill 160, before finally being passed as Act 29. Parliament recommences numbering from one at the beginning of each session. This means that two different bills may have the same number. Sessions of parliament usually last a year. They begin with the State Opening of Parliament, and end with prorogation.

=== United States ===
In the United States, all bills originating in the House of Representatives are numbered sequentially and prefixed with "H.R." and all bills originating from the Senate begin with an "S.". Every two years, at the start of odd-numbered years, the Congress recommences numbering from 1, though for bills the House has an order reserving the first 20 bill numbers and the Senate has similar measures for the first 10 bills. Joint resolutions also have the same effect as bills, and are titled as "H. J. Res." or "S. J. Res." depending on whether they originated in the House or Senate, respectively.

This means that two different bills can have the same number. Each two-year span is called a congress, tracking the terms of Representatives elected in the nationwide biennial House of Representatives elections, and each congress is divided into year-long periods called sessions.

== See also ==
- Legislation
- List of legislatures by country (most legislature articles have information on their processes)
- Resolution (law)
- White paper
- Bill (United States Congress)
- Procedures of the United States Congress
- Private bill
