= Sarupathar Bengali =

- city
- Location in Assam, India Sarupathar Bengali (India)
- Coordinates: 27.335°N 95.320°E
- Country: India
- State: Assam
- District: Dibrugarh

Population (2001)
  - Total: 6,607

Languages
  - Official: Assamese
- Time zone: UTC+5:30 (IST)
- Vehicle registration: AS

Sarupathar Bengali is a census town in Dibrugarh district in the Indian state of Assam.

== Demographics ==
At the 2001 India census, Sarupathar Bengali had a population of 6,607. Males constitute 55% of the population and females 45%. Sarupathar Bengali has an average literacy rate of 78%, higher than the national average of 59.5%: male literacy is 82%, and female literacy is 74%. In Sarupathar Bengali, 12% of the population is under 6 years of age.
