= Pegu (surname) =

Surname

Origin
- Region of origin: Assam, India

Pegu is a Mising surname.

== Notable people ==
- Bhubon Pegu, Indian Politician
- Rajib Lochan Pegu, Indian Politician
- Ranoj Pegu, Indian Politician
