= Paban Singh Ghatowar =

Indian politician

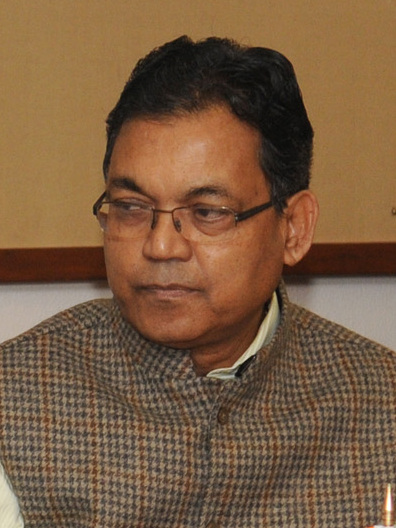
- Ghatowar in 2012

Union Minister of State (Independent Charge) for Development of North Eastern Region
- In office 12 July 2011 – 26 May 2014
- Prime Minister: Manmohan Singh
- Preceded by: Bijoy Krishna Handique
- Succeeded by: V.K. Singh

Union Minister of State for Parliamentary Affairs
- In office 20 July 2011 – 26 May 2014
- Prime Minister: Manmohan Singh
- Preceded by: Ashwani Kumar
- Succeeded by: Santosh Gangwar

Union Minister of State for Health and Family Welfare
- In office 15 September 1995 – 16 May 1996
- Prime Minister: P. V. Narasimha Rao
- Preceded by: C. Silvera
- Succeeded by: Saleem Iqbal Shervani
Junior ministerial offices
Union Deputy Minister of Labour
In office 21 June 1991 – 18 January 1993
Prime Minister	P. V. Narasimha Rao
Preceded by	Radhakishan Malviya
Succeeded by	Office abolished
Party political offices
Chief Whip of Congress in the Lok Sabha
In office 22 May 2009 – 12 July 2011
President	Sonia Gandhi
Preceded by	Madhusudan Mistry
Succeeded by	Sandeep Dikshit
President of Assam Pradesh Congress Committee
In office 2002–2004
Preceded by	Tarun Gogoi
Succeeded by	Bhubaneswar Kalita
Parliamentary offices
Member of Parliament, Lok Sabha
In office 1 June 2009 – 18 May 2014
Preceded by	Sarbananda Sonowal
Succeeded by	Rameswar Teli
Constituency	Dibrugarh
In office 20 June 1991 – 6 February 2004
Preceded by	Haren Bhumij
Succeeded by	Sarbananda Sonowal
Constituency	Dibrugarh

Personal details
- Born: 6 December 1950 (age 75) Sivasagar, Assam, India
- Party: Indian National Congress
- Spouse: Jibontara Ghatowar
- Children: 2

Paban Singh Ghatowar (born 6 December 1950) is an Indian politician who served as Minister of State (Independent Charge) for Development of North Eastern Region and Minister of State for Parliamentary Affairs from 2011 to 2014. He previously held junior ministerial positions in the Union Government under P. V. Narasimha Rao between 1991 and 1995. A member of the Indian National Congress, Ghatowar was the Member of the Lok Sabha for Dibrugarh from 1991 to 2004 and again from 2009 to 2014.

Ghatowar was president of the Assam Pradesh Congress Committee from 2002 to 2004, and Chief Whip of the Congress Parliamentary Party in the Lok Sabha from 2009 to 2011.

== Early life and education ==
Ghatowar was born in Sivasagar, Assam on 6 December 1950. He is a graduate of Gauhati University, and he studied Industrial Relations Training through the British Council in 1975. He was a leading figure of the Indian National Trade Union Congress in Assam, where he was General Secretary from 1985 to 1991, working for the welfare of tea garden labourers. A staunch trade unionist, Ghatowar was elected national vice-president of the Indian National Trade Union Congress in 1997.

== Political career ==
Ghatowar was elected to the Lok Sabha, the upper house of Parliament, in 1991, and he was re-elected in 1996, 1998, 1999, and 2009. He was Minister of State for Labour from 1991 to 1993, and for Health and Family Welfare from 1995 to 1996. While President of the Assam Pradesh Congress Committee from 2002 to 2004, Ghatowar was considered a potential Chief Minister for the Indian National Congress in Assam. After the Indian National Congress won the 2009 general elections, Ghatowar was appointed Chief Whip of the Congress Parliamentary Party in the Lok Sabha. On 12 July 2012, he was appointed Minister of State, (independent charge), for the Development of North Eastern Region under Manmohan Singh. On 20 July, he was additionally appointed Union Minister of State for Parliamentary Affairs.

== Personal life ==
Ghatowar's wife, Jibontara Ghatowar, was MLA of Moran from 2004 to 2016.
