= Sarbananda Sonowal =

Union Cabinet Minister and politician from Assam

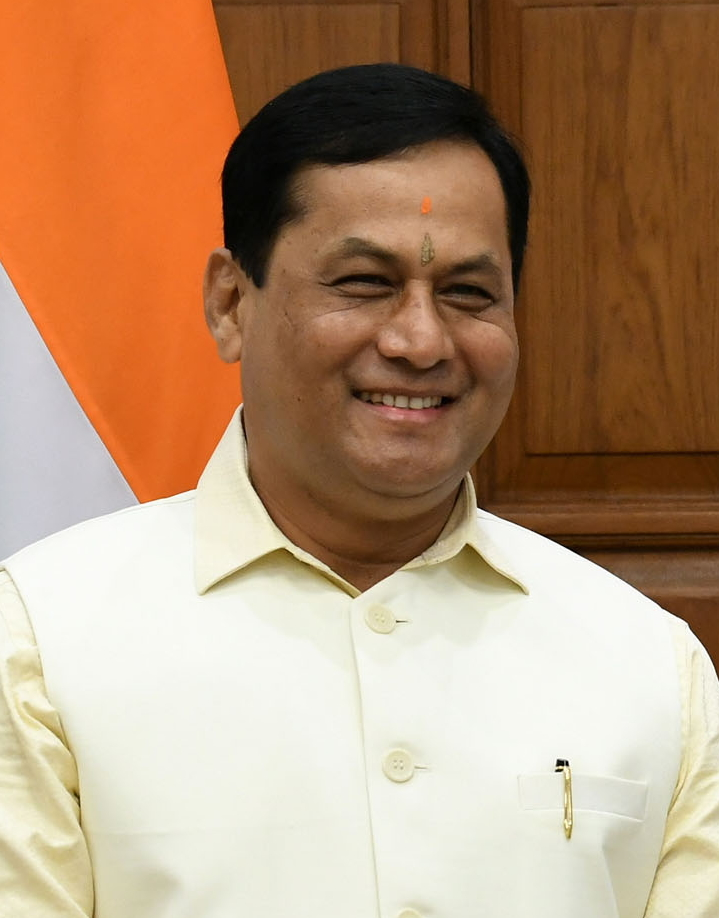
- Official portrait, 2021

Union Minister of Ports, Shipping and Waterways
- Incumbent
- Assumed office 7 July 2021
- Prime Minister: Narendra Modi
- Deputy: Shripad Yesso Naik; Shantanu Thakur
- Preceded by: Mansukh L. Mandaviya

14th Chief Minister of Assam
- In office 24 May 2016 – 10 May 2021
- Governor: Padmanabha Acharya; Banwarilal Purohit; Jagdish Mukhi
- Departments: List: Home; Political; Personal; General Administration; Secretariat Administration; Administrative Reforms and Training; Elections; Information and Public Relations; Border Areas Development; Implementation of Assam Accord; Welfare of Minorities (2016–18); Judicial, Legislative and Law (2016–18); Social Welfare (2016–18); Hill Areas Development (2016–18); Power (2016–18, 2019–21); Revenue and Disaster Management (2016–20); Sports and Youth Welfare (2018–21); Tea Tribes Welfare (2019–20); Labour Welfare (2019–21)
- Preceded by: Tarun Gogoi
- Succeeded by: Himanta Biswa Sarma

Member of Parliament, Lok Sabha
- Incumbent
- Assumed office 4 June 2024
- Preceded by: Rameswar Teli
- Constituency: Dibrugarh
- In office 16 May 2014 – 23 May 2016
- Preceded by: Ranee Narah
- Succeeded by: Pradan Baruah
- Constituency: Lakhimpur
- In office 13 May 2004 – 15 May 2009
- Preceded by: Paban Singh Ghatowar
- Succeeded by: Paban Singh Ghatowar
- Constituency: Dibrugarh

President, Assam Pradesh Bharatiya Janata Party
- In office 21 November 2015 – 6 June 2016
- Preceded by: Siddhartha Bhattacharya
- Succeeded by: Ranjeet Kumar Dass
- In office 9 November 2012 – 16 August 2014
- Preceded by: Ranjit Dutta
- Succeeded by: Siddhartha Bhattacharya
Former union ministerial positions
Union Minister of AYUSH
In office 7 July 2021 – 9 June 2024
Prime Minister	Narendra Modi
Deputy	Mahendra Munjapara
Preceded by	Shripad Naik
Succeeded by	Prataprao Ganpatrao Jadhav
Union Minister of State (Independent Charge) of Youth Affairs and Sports
In office 9 November 2014 – 23 May 2016
Prime Minister	Narendra Modi
Preceded by	Jitendra Singh
Succeeded by	Jitendra Singh Rana
Union Minister of State (Independent Charge) of Skill Development, Entrepreneurship, Youth Affairs and Sports
In office 26 May 2014 – 9 November 2014
Prime Minister	Narendra Modi
Succeeded by	Rajiv Pratap Rudy (as Minister, Skill Development and Entrepreneurship); Self (as Minister, Youth Affairs and Sports)
Former legislative positions
Member of Parliament, Rajya Sabha
In office 1 October 2021 – 4 June 2024
Preceded by	Biswajit Daimary
Succeeded by	Rameswar Teli
Constituency	Assam
Member, Assam Legislative Assembly
In office 19 May 2016 – 28 September 2021
Preceded by	Rajib Lochan Pegu
Succeeded by	Bhuban Gam
Constituency	Majuli
In office 13 May 2001 – 16 May 2004
Preceded by	Joy Chandra Nagbanshi
Succeeded by	Jibantara Ghatowar
Constituency	Moran

Personal details
- Born: 31 October 1962 (age 63) Mulukgaon, Assam, India
- Party: Bharatiya Janata Party (2011-present)
- Other political affiliations: Asom Gana Parishad (2001-11)
- Education: DHSK College, Dibrugarh University (B.A.); Gauhati University (LL.B, B.C.J)
- Profession: Lawyer

Sarbananda Sonowal (Assamese: [xɔɹbanɔndɔ xʊnʊwal]; born 31 October 1962) is an Indian politician who is serving as the 2nd Minister of Ports, Shipping and Waterways since 2021. He also has been a Member of the Rajya Sabha representing Assam since 2021 and also a member of the Cabinet Committee on Political Affairs since 2021. He previously served as the 14th Chief Minister of Assam (2016–2021), as a member of Assam Legislative Assembly for Majuli (2016–2021) and for Moran (2001–2004). Sonowal earlier served as the Assam state unit President of Bharatiya Janata Party (BJP) from 2012 to 2014 and again from 2015 to 2016. He also served as the Minister of Sports and Youth Affairs, Government of India, from 2014 to 2016 and the Minister of State for Entrepreneurship and Skill Development from 2014 to 2014 and the member of the Lok Sabha from Lakhimpur from 2014 to 2016 and from Dibrugarh from 2004 to 2009. He was also the member of the Asom Gana Parishad from 2001 to 2011.

== Early life and education ==
Sarbananda Sonowal was born on 31 October 1962 to a Sonowal family in Muluk Gaon located in the Dibrugarh district of Assam to Jibeswar Sonowal (father) and Dineswari Sonowal (mother).

Sonowal did his schooling at Don Bosco High School, Dibrugarh. He completed his B.A.(Hons) in English from Dibrugarh Hanumanbax Surajmall Kanoi College under Dibrugarh University and his LLB from Gauhati University and B.C.J from Gauhati University.

== Political career ==
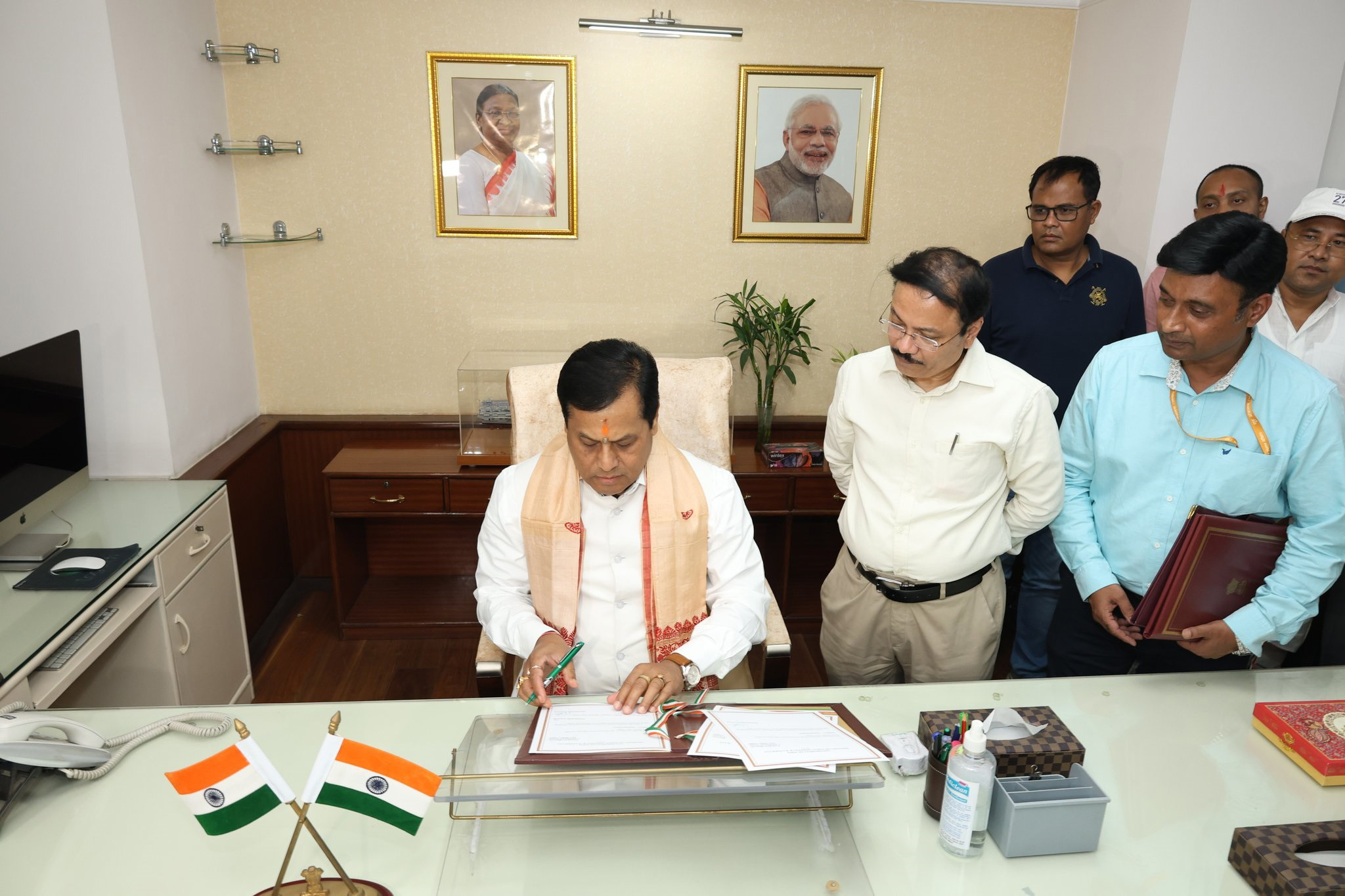
Sonowal taking charge as Union Minister for Ministry of Ports, Shipping and Waterways, in New Delhi on June 11, 2024.

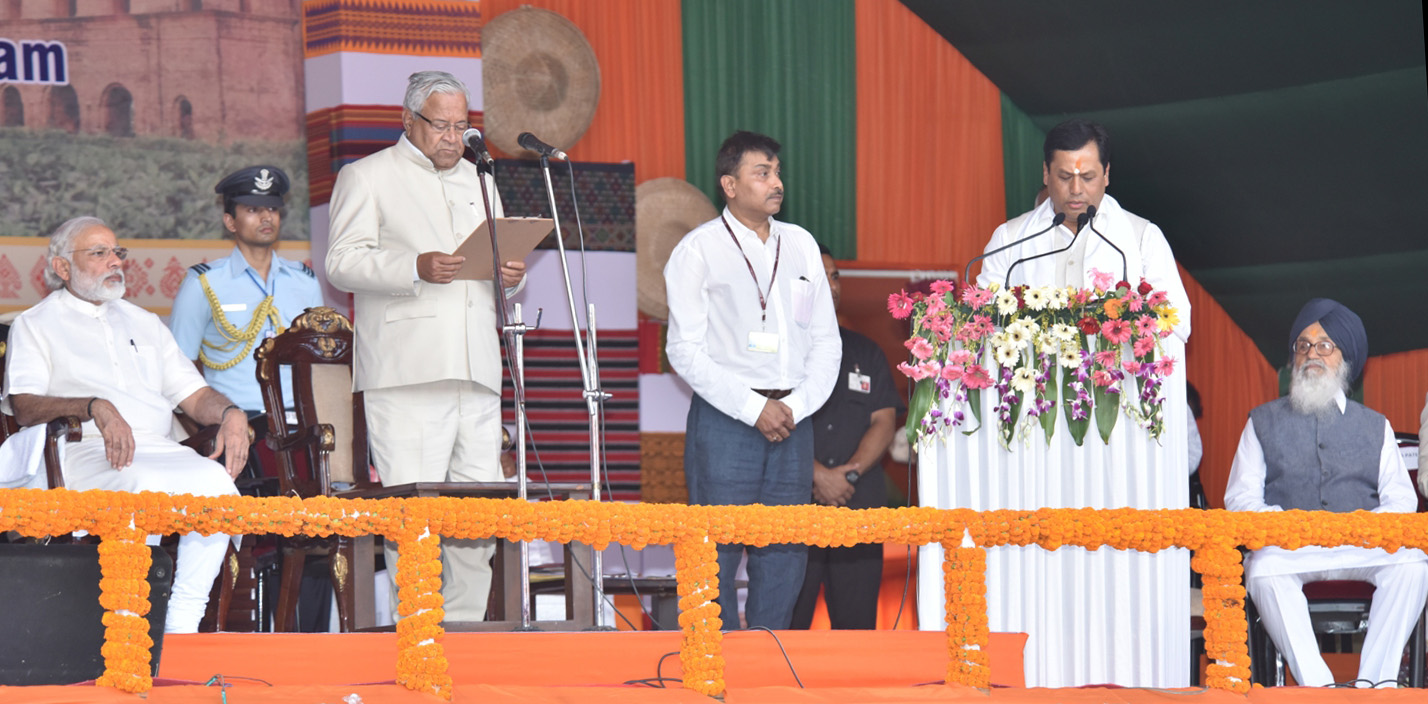
Sonowal taking oath as Chief Minister of Assam on 24 May 2016.

Sarbananda Sonowal was the President of Assam's oldest student body, the All Assam Students Union (AASU) from 1992 to 1999. After that, he became a member of the Asom Gana Parishad (AGP). In 2001, he was elected as the MLA from Moran constituency of Assam. In 2004, he became a Lok Sabha member representing the Dibrugarh constituency. He lost Lok Sabha election from Dibrugarh in 2009. He joined Bharatiya Janata Party (BJP) in 2011.

He was appointed president of BJP's Assam Unit in 2012 and is also a member of the party's National Executive. In the 2014 general election for Lok Sabha he was appointed to head Assam State's Lok Sabha Elections by BJP, and in the same year he was also elected as Member of Parliament, 16th Lok Sabha, from Lakhimpur Constituency. He was then appointed as Union Minister of State-Independent Charge, of the Government of India under the Modi Government at the center.

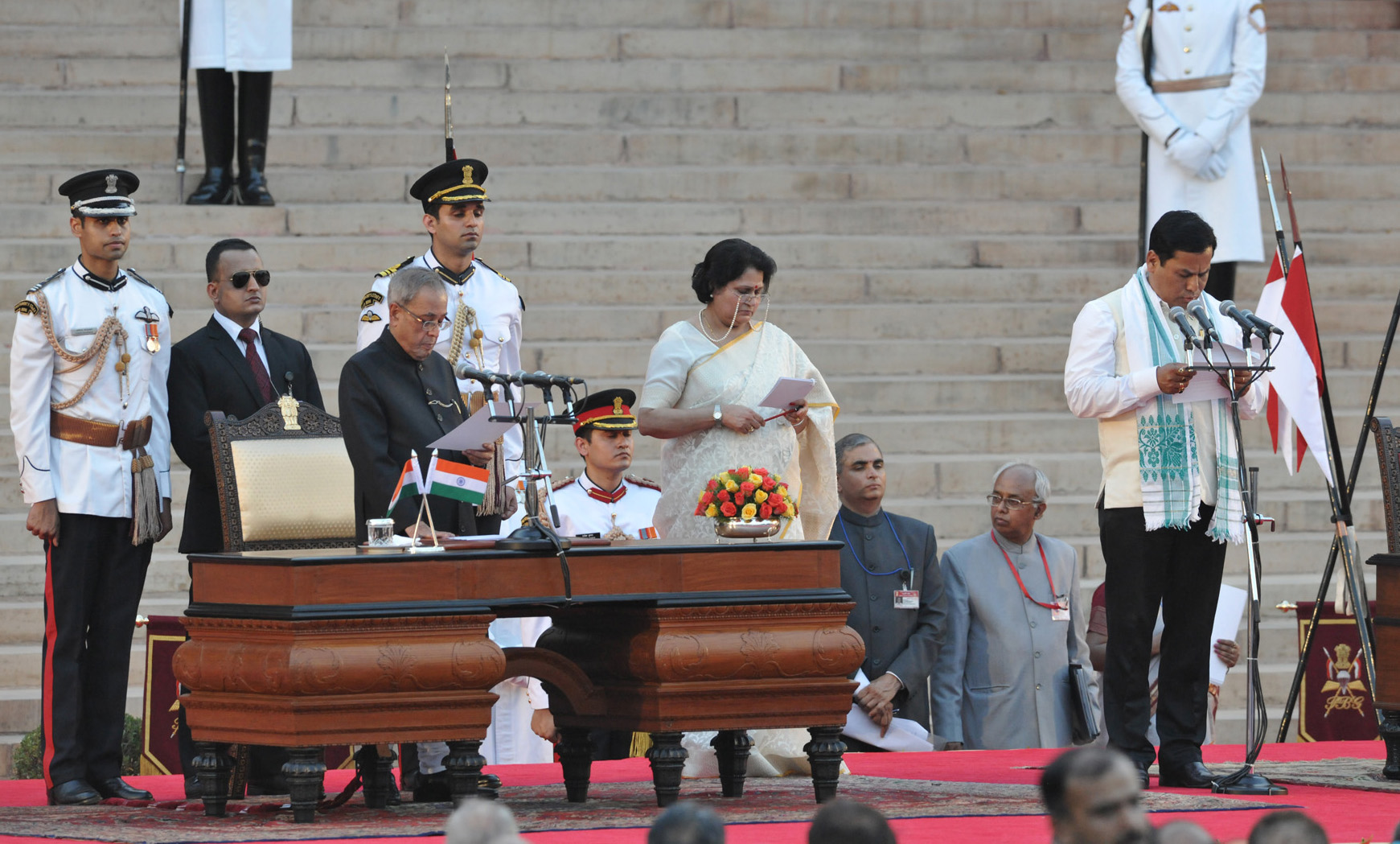
The President, Shri Pranab Mukherjee administering the oath as Minister of State (Independent Charge) to Shri Sarbananda Sonowal, at a Swearing-in Ceremony, at Rashtrapati Bhavan, in New Delhi on May 26, 2014

He was selected as the CM candidate of BJP for the 2016 Assam Assembly Election. On 19 May 2016, Sarbananda Sonowal won the Assembly Election from Majuli Constituency, and he became Chief Minister of Assam, the first CM of the state from Bharatiya Janata Party. In 2021 he was re-elected to Assam Vidhan Sabha from Majuli. He resigned as Chief Minister and proposed Himanta Biswa Sarma's name as his successor. He became Minister of Ports, Shipping and Waterways and Minister of AYUSH in Second Modi ministry when cabinet overhaul happened.

=== Career in the Bharatiya Janata Party ===
Sarbananda Sonowal resigned from all executive posts within AGP and left the party, due to dissatisfaction with and amongst the senior leadership of the party who were trying to forge an alliance with a party that was against the scrapping of the controversial IMDT Act. On 8 February 2011, Sonowal joined BJP in the presence of the then BJP National President Nitin Gadkari and senior leaders like Varun Gandhi, Vijay Goel, Bijoya Chakravarty and state BJP president Ranjit Dutta. He was immediately appointed as a member of the BJP National Executive and later on the State Spokesperson of the BJP unit, prior to his current assignment to head the state as the new president. On 28 January 2016, BJP Parliamentary Board announced Sarbananda Sonowal as BJP Chief Ministerial candidate of Assam.

=== Positions held ===
- 2001-2004: Elected as MLA, Assam Legislative Assembly from Moran Constituency
- 2004: Elected as Member of Parliament, 14th Lok Sabha from Dibrugarh Constituency
- 2005: Appointed Member, Consultative Committee, Ministry of Home Affairs
- 2006: Appointed Member, Consultative Committee, Ministry of Commerce & Industry
- 2011: Appointed National Executive Member of Bharatiya Janata Party
- 2011: Appointed State Spokesperson and General Secretary for Assam Bharatiya Janata Party
- 2012: Appointed State President for Assam Bharatiya Janata Party
- 2014: Appointed to head State's 16th Lok Sabha Elections Assam Bharatiya Janata Party
- 2014: Elected as Member of Parliament, 16th Lok Sabha from Lakhimpur Constituency
- 2014: Appointed Union Minister of State-Independent Charge, Republic of India
- 2016: Declared as BJP Chief minister candidate for 2016 Assam assembly elections.
- 2016-2021: Member of Assam Legislative Assembly from Majuli Constituency
- 2016–2021: 14th Chief Minister of Assam
- 2021–present: Minister of Ports, Shipping and Waterways and Minister of AYUSH in the Government of India
- 2021–present: Member of the Cabinet Committee on Political Affairs in the Government of India
- 2021–2024: Member of Parliament, Rajya Sabha
- 2024–Present: Member of Parliament, Dibrugarh Lok Sabha constituency

== Electoral performance ==
=== Lok Sabha elections ===
Year	Constituency	Party	Votes	%	Opponent		Votes	%	Result	Margin
1999	Lakhimpur	AGP	201,402	26.3	Ranee Narah	INC	255,925	33.4	Lost	54,523
2004	Dibrugarh	AGP	220,944	35.0	Kamakhya Prasad Tasa	BJP	202,390	32.1	Won	18,554
2009	Dibrugarh	AGP	324,020	43.2	Paban Singh Ghatowar	INC	359,163	47.8	Lost	35,143
2014	Lakhimpur	BJP	612,543	55.1	Ranee Narah	INC	320,405	28.8	Won	292,138
2024	Dibrugarh	BJP	693,762	54.3	Lurinjyoti Gogoi	AJP	414,441	32.4	Won	279,321

=== Legislative Assembly elections ===
Year	Constituency	Party	Votes	%	Opponent		Votes	%	Result	Margin
2001	Moran	AGP	27777	42.64	Jibontara Ghatowar	INC	26927	41.33	Won	850
2016	Majuli (ST)	BJP	49,602	51.3	Rajib Lochan Pegu	INC	30,679	31.7	Won	18,923
2021	Majuli (ST)	BJP	71,436	68.2	Rajib Lochan Pegu	INC	28,244	27.0	Won	43,192

== Personal life ==
He is not married.

== Social and cultural activities ==
- President - All Assam Students Union, 1992–1999
- Chairman - North East Students Organisation, 1996–2000

== Arts & culture ==
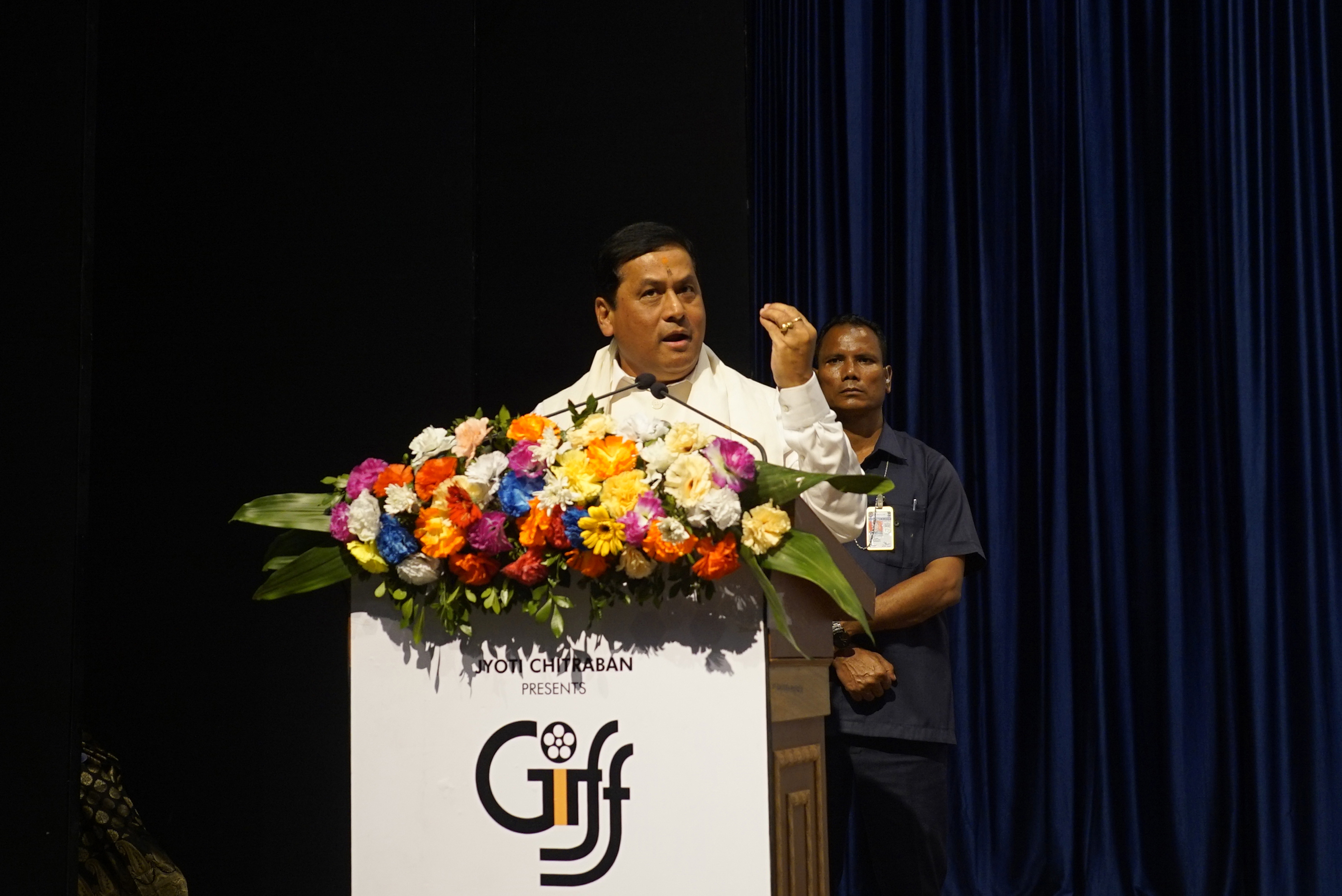
Sonowal delivering a speech

The annual Guwahati International Film Festival was started during his tenure. It is organised by the State Government-owned Jyoti Chitraban (Film Studio) Society in association with the Dr. Bhupen Hazarika Regional Government Film and Television Institute. The first edition was held in October 2018, the second in October–November 2019. The 3rd edition has been postponed owing to the present COVID-19 pandemic to early 2021.

== Role removing the IMDT Act ==
Faced with the problem of massive migration from Bangladesh into Assam, the government tried to put up legislation in place to detect and deport foreign nationals. Eventually, the Illegal Migrants (Determination by Tribunal) Act, 1983 (IMDT Act) came into being following the Assam Accord signed between the Government of India and the All Assam Students Union (AASU) to end the decade-long anti-foreigner agitation.

The IMDT Act is an instrument passed by Indian Parliament to detect illegal immigrants (from Bangladesh) and expel them from Assam. While the IMDT Act operates only in Assam, the Foreigners Act (1946) applies to the rest of the country. It is applicable to those Bangladeshi nationals who settled in Assam on or after 25 March 1971. Under the Act, the onus of proving the citizenship of a suspected illegal alien rests on the complainant, often the police. On the other hand, according to the provisions of the Foreigners Act, the onus lies with the person suspected to be an alien.

Sonowal took the issue of Bangladeshi infiltration to the Supreme Court. By its judgement dated 12 July 2005, the court struck down the Illegal Migrants (Determination by Tribunal) Act, 1983, as unconstitutional and termed Bangladeshi infiltration an "external aggression" and directed that "the Bangladesh nationals who have illegally crossed the border and have trespassed into Assam or are living in other parts of the country have no legal right of any kind to remain in India and they are liable to be deported."

== See also ==
- Sonowal Kacharis
- All Assam Students Union
- Asom Gana Parishad
- Sonowal ministry
- Third Modi ministry

Lok Sabha
Preceded by Paban Singh Ghatowar	Member of Parliament for Dibrugarh; 2004 – 2009	Succeeded by Paban Singh Ghatowar
Preceded by Ranee Narah	Member of Parliament for Lakhimpur; 2014 – 2016	Succeeded by Pradan Baruah
Political offices
Preceded by Tarun Gogoi	Chief Minister of Assam; 24 May 2016 – 10 May 2021	Succeeded by Himanta Biswa Sarma
Preceded by Mansukh Mandaviya	Minister of Ports, Shipping and Waterways; 7 July 2021 – Present	Incumbent
Preceded by Shripad Naik; Minister of State with Independent Charge	Minister of Ayush; 7 July 2021 – Present	Incumbent
