= Cabinet Committee (India) =

Government decision making body

Cabinet Committee (India) are the extra constitutional decision making bodies forming part of the Union Cabinet in Government of India and are powerful high profile committees with varied functions. The committees are formed by Prime Minister of India with defined functions and specified members for each committee.

== Background ==
Cabinet Committee (India) are the extra constitutional highest decision making authorities formed to reduce the workload of cabinet ministers and facilitates intense examination of issues relating to policies and helping in effective coordination.

== Number ==
Cabinet Committee (India) has below mentioned eight committees

- Appointments Committee of the Cabinet
- Cabinets Committee on Accommodation
- Cabinet Committee on Economic Affairs
- Cabinet Committee on Parliamentary Affairs
- Cabinet Committee on Political Affairs (CCPA)
- Cabinet Committee on Security (CCS)
- Cabinet committee on investment & growth
- Cabinet Committee on Employment and skill development

== Chairman and members ==
Cabinet Committee (India) is headed by Prime Minister of India in various committees and members include representatives of ruling party and its allies.

== See also ==
- Cabinet Committee on Security
