= Majuli Assembly constituency =

Majuli
- Constituency No. 98 for the Assam Legislative Assembly

Constituency details
- Country: India
- Region: Northeast India
- State: Assam
- District: Majuli
- Lok Sabha constituency: Jorhat
- Established: 1962
- Reservation: ST

Majuli is one of the 126 assembly constituencies of Assam a north east state of India. Majuli is also part of Jorhat Lok Sabha constituency. It is a reserved seat for the Scheduled tribes (ST).

== Members of the Legislative Assembly ==
Year	Name	Party
1962	Malchandra Pegu	Indian National Congress
1967	M. Pegu	Independent
1972	Mal Chandna Pegu	Indian National Congress
1978	Chakbhal Kagyang	Janata Party
1985	Padmeswar Doley	Independent
1991	Padmeswar Doley	Asom Gana Parishad
1996	Karuna Dutta	Asom Gana Parishad
2000^	Jogeswar Doley	Asom Gana Parishad
2001	Rajib Lochan Pegu	Indian National Congress
2006	Rajib Lochan Pegu	Indian National Congress
2011	Rajib Lochan Pegu	Indian National Congress
2016	Sarbananda Sonowal	Bharatiya Janata Party
2021	Sarbananda Sonowal	Bharatiya Janata Party
2022 (Note: by-election)	Bhuban Gam	Bharatiya Janata Party
2026	Bhuban Gam	Bharatiya Janata Party

^ indicates Bye-Elections

== Election results ==
=== 2026 ===
2026 Assam Legislative Assembly election: Majuli
Party	Candidate	Votes	%	±%
BJP	Bhuban Gam	78,324	63.51	
INC	Indraneel Pegu	43,024	34.89	
NOTA	NOTA	958	0.78	
Margin of victory		35,300	28.62	
Turnout		1,23,325		
BJP hold		Swing		

=== 2022 by-election ===
This by-election was triggered after the incumbent MLA, Sarbananda Sonowal, resigned to become a member of the Rajya Sabha.

2022 Assam Legislative Assembly By-election
Party	Candidate	Votes	%	±%
BJP	Bhuban Gam	67,242	69.86	
AJP	Chittaranjan Basumatary	25,101	26.08	
SUCI(C)	Bhaity Richong	2,265	2.35	
Turnout		96,250		
Registered electors		1,33,227		
BJP hold		Swing		

=== 2021 ===
Assam Legislative Assembly Election, 2021: Majuli
Party	Candidate	Votes	%	±%
BJP	Sarbananda Sonowal	71,436	67.53	+16.79
INC	Rajib Lochan Pegu	28,244	28.27	−3.11
SUCI(C)	Bhaity Richong	1,080	1.02	+0.20
Independent	None of the Above	1,075	1.02	+0.01
Majority		43,192	39.26	+19.90
Turnout		1,05,782	79.89	−5.44
Registered electors		1,32,403		
BJP hold		Swing	+16.79	

=== 2016 ===
Assam Legislative Assembly Election, 2016: Majuli
Party	Candidate	Votes	%	±%
BJP	Sarbananda Sonowal	49,602	50.74	+47.82
INC	Rajib Lochan Pegu	30,679	31.38	−14.98
Independent	Ranjit Doley	15,695	16.05	+16.05
SUCI(C)	Hemanta Pegu	798	0.82	+0.82
Independent	None of the Above	987	1.01	
Majority		18,923	19.36	
Turnout		97,761	85.33	+4.67
Registered electors		1,14,572		
BJP gain from INC		Swing	+47.82	

=== 2011 ===
Assam Legislative Assembly Election, 2011: Majuli
Party	Candidate	Votes	%	±%
INC	Rajib Lochan Pegu	39,655	46.36	
Independent	Padmeswar Doley	23,691	27.70	+27.70
Independent	Premadhar Doley	19,690	23.02	+23.02
Independent	Achiram Doley	2,500	2.92	+2.92
Majority		15,964	42.85	
Turnout		85,536	80.66	
INC hold		Swing		

== See also ==
- Majuli
- List of constituencies of the Assam Legislative Assembly
