= Ministry of Ports, Shipping and Waterways =

Government ministry of India

- Branch of Government of India

- Ministry of Ports, Shipping and Waterways

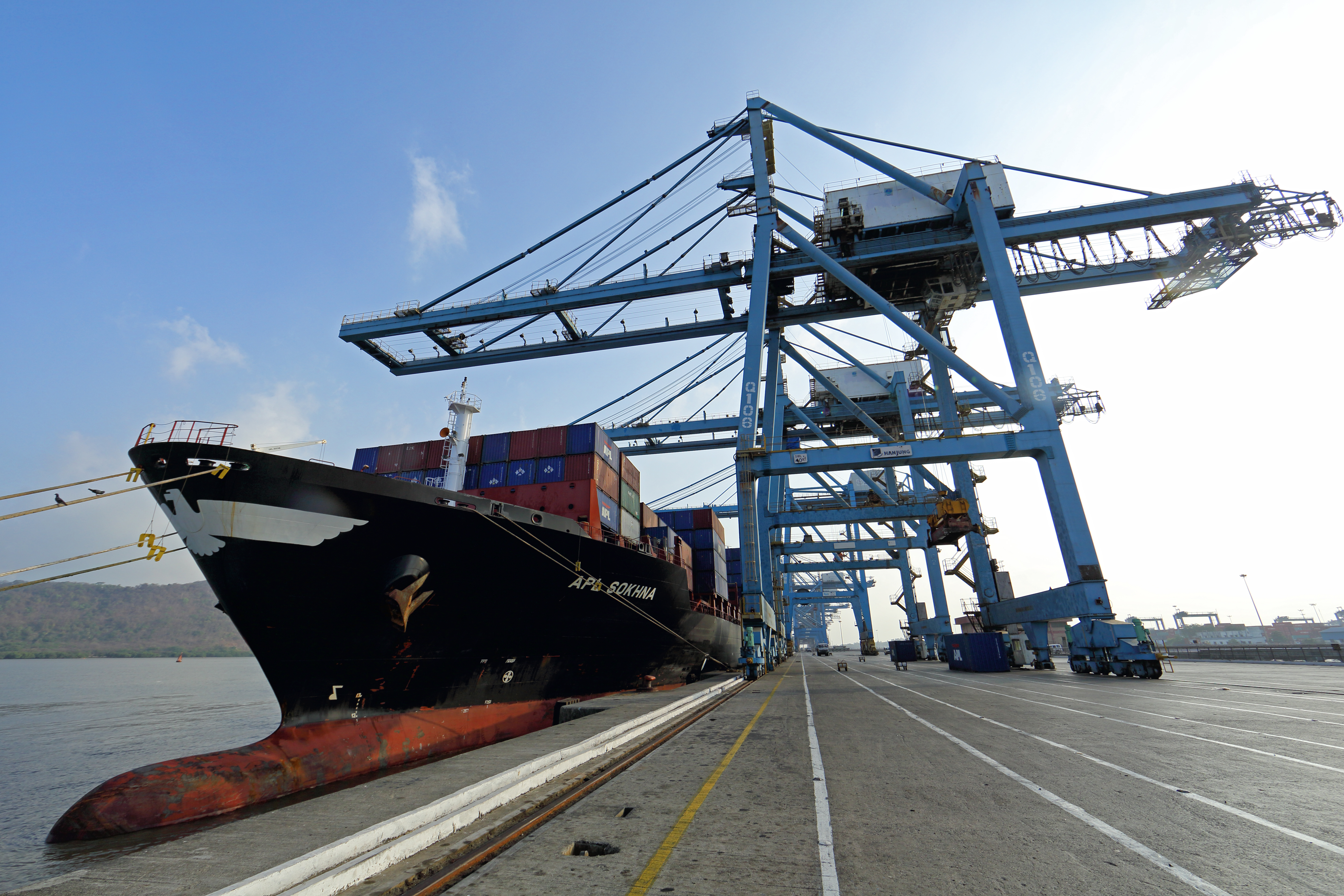
- Indian Port

Agency overview
- Jurisdiction: Government of India
- Headquarters: Parivahan Bhavan 1, Parliament Street New Delhi; 110001 28°37′9.58″N 77°12′37.29″E
- Annual budget: ₹5,164.80 crore (US$540 million) (2026-27)
- Minister responsible: Sarbananda Sonowal, Cabinet Minister; Shantanu Thakur, Minister of State
- Website: shipmin.gov.in

The Ministry of Ports, Shipping and Waterways is the Indian ministry responsible for formulation and administration of the rules, regulations and laws relating to ports, shipping and waterways. The minister is Sarbananda Sonowal.

== History ==
In 1999, the Ministry of Surface Transport was re-organized into two departments, namely the Department of Shipping and the Department of Road Transport and Highways.

In 2000, the Ministry of Surface Transport was bifurcated into two Ministries namely the Ministry of Surface Transport and Highways and the Ministry of Shipping.

In 2004, The Ministry of Shipping and Ministry of Road Transport were again merged and renamed as Ministry of Shipping, Road Transport and Highways. There are two Department viz. Department of Shipping and Department of Road Transport & Highways.

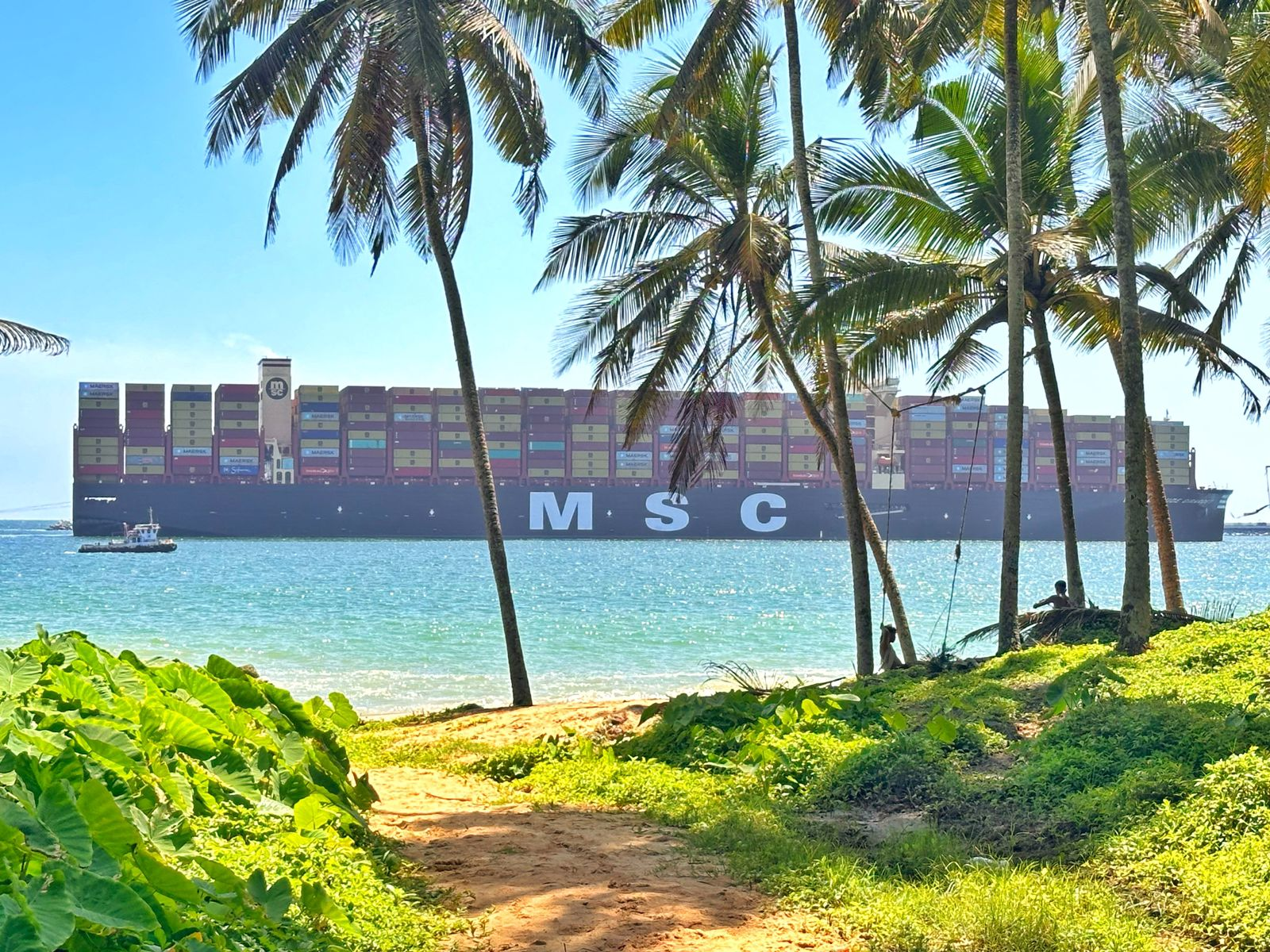
Ultra large container vessel MSC Claude Girardet the largest vessel to berth in South Asia arriving at Vizhinjam International Seaport Thiruvananthapuram, India

In 2009, The Ministry of Shipping was again formed by bifurcating the Ministry Of Shipping, Road Transport, and Highways

Further, in 2020 the Ministry of Shipping was renamed as Ministry of Ports, Shipping and Waterways.

== Organization of Ministry ==
=== Divisions ===
- Ports
- Ports Human Resources
- Public Private Partnership
- Administration
- Information Technology
- Shipping (Wing)
- Coordination
- Sagarmala
- Media
- Finance
- Vigilance
- Budget
- Economic Advisory
- Accounts
- Parliament
- Official Language
- Development
- Transport Research
- Inland Water Transport (Wing)
- International Cooperation

=== Subordinate/Attached Offices ===
- Directorate General of Shipping, Mumbai
- Andaman & Lakshadweep Harbour Works, Port Blair
- Directorate General of Lighthouses and Lightships

=== Autonomous Bodies ===
- Syama Prasad Mookerjee Port Authority
- Paradip Port Authority
- Visakhapatnam Port Authority
- Chennai Port Authority
- V.O.Chidambarnar Port Authority
- Cochin Port Authority
- New Mangalore Port Authority
- Mormugao Port Authority
- Mumbai Port Authority
- Jawaharlal Nehru Port Authority
- Deendayal Port Authority
- Seamen's provident fund Organisation
- Dock Labour Board Kolkata
- Inland Waterways Authority of India
- Tariff Authority for Major Ports

=== Educational Institutions ===
- Indian Maritime University - the university has six campuses in Chennai, Kochi, Kolkata, Mumbai Port, Navi Mumbai, and Visakhapatnam.

=== Public Sector Undertakings (PSUs) ===
- Shipping Corporation of India, Mumbai
- Cochin Shipyard Limited, Cochin
  - Hooghly Cochin Shipyard Limited
- Hooghly Dock & Ports Engineers Limited.
- Sagarmala Development Company Limited
- Indian Port Rail & Ropeway Corporation Limited
- India Ports Global Limited
- Sethusamudram Corporation Limited

=== Societies/Association ===
- Indian Ports Association
- Seafares Welfare Fund Society

== Cabinet Ministers ==
Portrait	Minister (Birth-Death) Constituency	Term of office			Political party	Ministry	Prime Minister
Portrait	Minister (Birth-Death) Constituency	From	To	Period	Political party	Ministry	Prime Minister
Minister of Shipping
	Arun Jaitley (1952–2019); Rajya Sabha MP for Uttar Pradesh	7 November 2000	1 September 2001	298 days	Bharatiya Janata Party	Vajpayee III	Atal Bihari Vajpayee
	Ved Prakash Goyal (1926–2008); Rajya Sabha MP for Maharashtra	1 September 2001	29 January 2003	1 year, 150 days	Bharatiya Janata Party	Vajpayee III	Atal Bihari Vajpayee
	Shatrughan Sinha (born 1946); Rajya Sabha MP for Bihar	29 January 2003	22 May 2004	1 year, 114 days	Bharatiya Janata Party	Vajpayee III	Atal Bihari Vajpayee
	K. Chandrashekar Rao (born 1954); MP for Karimnagar	23 May 2004	25 May 2004	2 days	Bharat Rashtra Samithi	Manmohan I	Manmohan Singh
	T. R. Baalu (born 1941); MP for Chennai South	25 May 2004	2 September 2004	100 days	Dravida Munnetra Kazhagam	Manmohan I	Manmohan Singh
Merged with Ministry of Shipping, Road Transport and Highways during this interval
	G. K. Vasan (born 1964); Rajya Sabha MP for Tamil Nadu	28 May 2009	26 May 2014	4 years, 363 days	Indian National Congress	Manmohan II	Manmohan Singh
	Nitin Gadkari (born 1957); MP for Nagpur	27 May 2014	30 May 2019	5 years, 4 days	Bharatiya Janata Party	Modi I	Narendra Modi
	Mansukh Mandaviya (born 1972); Rajya Sabha MP for Gujarat (Minister of State, I/C)	31 May 2019	10 November 2020	1 year, 163 days	Bharatiya Janata Party	Modi II	Narendra Modi
Minister of Ports, Shipping and Waterways
	Mansukh Mandaviya (born 1972); Rajya Sabha MP for Gujarat (Minister of State, I/C)	10 November 2020	7 July 2021	239 days	Bharatiya Janata Party	Modi II	Narendra Modi
	Sarbananda Sonowal (born 1962); Rajya Sabha MP for Assam, until 2024; MP for Dibrugarh, from 2024	7 July 2021	9 June 2024	5 years, 89 days	Bharatiya Janata Party	Modi II	Narendra Modi
	Sarbananda Sonowal (born 1962); Rajya Sabha MP for Assam, until 2024; MP for Dibrugarh, from 2024	10 June 2024	Incumbent	5 years, 89 days	Bharatiya Janata Party	Modi III	Narendra Modi

== Ministers of State ==
Portrait	Minister (Birth-Death) Constituency	Term of office			Political party	Ministry	Prime Minister
Portrait	Minister (Birth-Death) Constituency	From	To	Period	Political party	Ministry	Prime Minister
Minister of State for Shipping
	Hukmdev Narayan Yadav (born 1939); MP for Madhubani	7 November 2000	2 November 2001	360 days	Bharatiya Janata Party	Vajpayee III	Atal Bihari Vajpayee
	Shripad Naik (born 1952); MP for Panaji	2 November 2001	14 May 2002	193 days	Bharatiya Janata Party	Vajpayee III	Atal Bihari Vajpayee
	Su. Thirunavukkarasar (born 1949); MP for Pudukkottai	1 July 2002	29 January 2003	212 days	Bharatiya Janata Party	Vajpayee III	Atal Bihari Vajpayee
	Dilipkumar Gandhi (1951–2021); MP for Ahmednagar	29 January 2003	15 March 2004	1 year, 46 days	Bharatiya Janata Party	Vajpayee III	Atal Bihari Vajpayee
Minister of State for Shipping
	Mukul Roy (born 1954); Rajya Sabha MP for West Bengal	28 May 2009	20 March 2012	2 years, 297 days	All India Trinamool Congress	Manmohan II	Manmohan Singh
	Milind Deora (born 1976); MP for Mumbai South	31 October 2012	26 May 2014	1 year, 207 days	Indian National Congress	Manmohan II	Manmohan Singh
	Krishan Pal Gurjar (born 1957); MP for Faridabad	26 May 2014	9 November 2014	167 days	Bharatiya Janata Party	Modi I	Narendra Modi
	Pon Radhakrishnan (born 1952); MP for Kanniyakumari	9 November 2014	30 May 2019	4 years, 202 days	Bharatiya Janata Party	Modi I	Narendra Modi
	Mansukh Mandaviya (born 1972); Rajya Sabha MP for Gujarat	5 July 2016	30 May 2019	2 years, 329 days	Bharatiya Janata Party	Modi I	Narendra Modi
Minister of State for Ports, Shipping and Waterways
	Shripad Naik (born 1952); MP for North Goa	7 July 2021	9 June 2024	2 years, 338 days	Bharatiya Janata Party	Modi II	Narendra Modi
	Shantanu Thakur (born 1982); MP for Bangaon	7 July 2021	9 June 2024	5 years, 89 days	Bharatiya Janata Party	Modi II	Narendra Modi
	Shantanu Thakur (born 1982); MP for Bangaon	10 June 2024	Incumbent	5 years, 89 days	Bharatiya Janata Party	Modi III	Narendra Modi

== See also ==
- Inland Waterways Authority of India
- Exclusive economic zone of India
- Fishing in India
- Outline of India
