= Duliajan Assembly constituency =

Constituency of the Assam legislative assembly in India

Duliajan
- Constituency No. 90 for the Assam Legislative Assembly

Constituency details
- Country: India
- Region: Northeast India
- State: Assam
- District: Dibrugarh
- Lok Sabha constituency: Dibrugarh
- Established: 1978
- Reservation: None

Duliajan Assembly constituency is one of the 126 assembly constituencies of Assam Legislative Assembly. Duliajan forms part of the Dibrugarh Lok Sabha constituency.

== Members of Legislative Assembly ==
Election	Name	Party
1978	Jogendra Nath Hazarika	Janata Party
1985	Amiya Gogoi	Indian National Congress
1991	Amiya Gogoi	Indian National Congress
1996	Amiya Gogoi	Indian National Congress
2001	Rameswar Teli	Bharatiya Janata Party
2006	Rameswar Teli	Bharatiya Janata Party
2011	Amiya Gogoi	Indian National Congress
2016	Terash Gowalla	Bharatiya Janata Party
2021	Terash Gowalla	Bharatiya Janata Party
2026	Rameshwar Teli	Bharatiya Janata Party

== Election results ==
=== 2026 ===
2026 Assam Legislative Assembly election: Duliajan
Party	Candidate	Votes	%	±%
BJP	Rameswar Teli	71467	49.81	
INC	Dhrubajyoti Gogoi	61008	42.52	
NOTA	NOTA	2610	1.82	
Margin of victory		10459		
Turnout		143474		
Rejected ballots				
Registered electors				
BJP hold		Swing		

=== 2016 ===
2016 Assam Legislative Assembly election: Duliajan
Party	Candidate	Votes	%	±%
BJP	Terash Gowalla	58,450	51.13	
INC	Dhrubajyoti Gogoi	41,364	36.18	
Independent	Amiya Gogoi	4,376	3.82	
Independent	Ramesh Phukan	1,816	1.58	
Independent	Hiranya Sonowal	1,144	1.00	
JCP	Anjali Senapati	1,037	0.90	
Independent	Jatin Konwar	825	0.72	
CPI(ML)L	Sunil Tanti	710	0.62	
Independent	Probin Hazarika	651	0.56	
Independent	Isak Karkaria	637	0.55	
SS	Jhuma Deb Nath	542	0.47	
NOTA	None of the above	2,761	2.41	
Majority		17,086	14.95	
Turnout		1,14,313	82.62	
Registered electors		1,38,356		
BJP gain from INC		Swing		

== See also ==
- List of constituencies of the Assam Legislative Assembly
