= Indian Ports Association =

Indian statutory body

Indian Ports Association.
- Formation: 1966
- Legal status: Established under the Societies Registration Act, 1860 enacted by the Parliament of India
- Headquarters: New Delhi.
- Region served: India
- Members: 12 Major ports of India
- Managing Director: Vikas Narwal
- Parent organization: Ministry of Ports, Shipping and Waterways, Government of India
- Website: Official website

Indian Ports Association is a statutory and autonomous body registered under the Societies Registration Act and constituted in 1966 to foster growth and development of major ports which are under Ministry of Ports, Shipping and Waterways (MoPSW), Government of India.

== History and Objective ==
The Indian Ports Association was formed in 1966 for controlling the operation of 12 major ports. It works under the supervision of Ministry of Shipping and was formed with the objective of undertaking research related to planning and organisation, fixing wages of staff working in the 12 ports and making efforts on promoting technical and economic situations relating to ports.

The organisation also acts as an integration of national and international organisations forming part of port and harbour organisations, port management allied activities and liaises between the Ministry of Shipping, ports, and other agencies related to Government. One of the main objectives of the organisation is to promote uniformity and standardise the functions in ports.

Mr. A K Bose is the current Managing Director of the Indian Ports Association.

== See also ==
List of Ports in India
