= Bhuban Gam =

Indian politician

Member of the Assam Legislative Assembly
- Incumbent
- Assumed office 10 March 2022
- Preceded by: Sarbananda Sonowal
- Constituency: Majuli

Personal details
- Citizenship: India
- Party: Bharatiya Janata Party
- Other political affiliations: National Democratic Alliance
- Parent: 2
- Occupation: Politician
- Profession: Politician

Bhuban Gam is an Indian politician from Bharatiya Janata party who has been a member of Assam Legislative Assembly since 2022 following a re-election from Majuli constituency, when Sarbanananda Sanowal resigns to become Union minister.
