= Rajib Lochan Pegu =

Indian politician

- ৰাজীব লোচন পেগু

Minister of State (Independent Charge), Assam
- In office 30 May 2011 – 26 January 2015
- Chief Minister: Tarun Gogoi
- Departments: Water Resources; Welfare of Plain Tribes and Backward Classes
- Preceded by: Prithibi Majhi (Water Resources); Pramila Rani Brahma (WPT&BC)
- Succeeded by: Basanta Das (Water Resources)

Member, Assam Legislative Assembly
- In office 13 May 2001 – 19 May 2016
- Preceded by: Jogeswar Doley
- Succeeded by: Sarbananda Sonowal
- Constituency: Majuli

Personal details
- Born: 1 July 1960 (age 66)
- Spouse: Mrinali Pegu (m. 1986)
- Education: M.A. (English)

Rajib Lochan Pegu is an Indian politician from Assam. He was a member of Assam Legislative Assembly from Majuli Assembly constituency (no 99) in Majuli district from 2001 till 2016, as a member of the Indian National Congress. He was Minister of water resources in Tarun Gogoi government.
