= Karuna Dutta =

Indian politician

Karuna Dutta is an Asom Gana Parishad politician from Assam, India. He was elected to the Assam Legislative Assembly in the 1996 election from Majuli constituency.
