= Line of Actual Control =

Disputed boundary between China and India

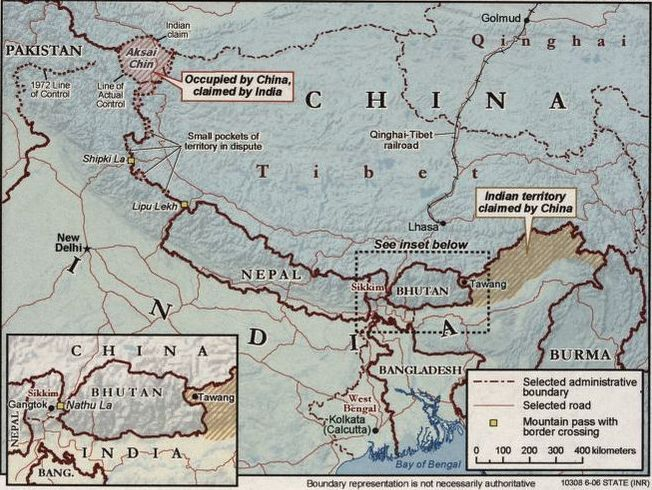
Line of Actual Control between China and India (map by the CIA)

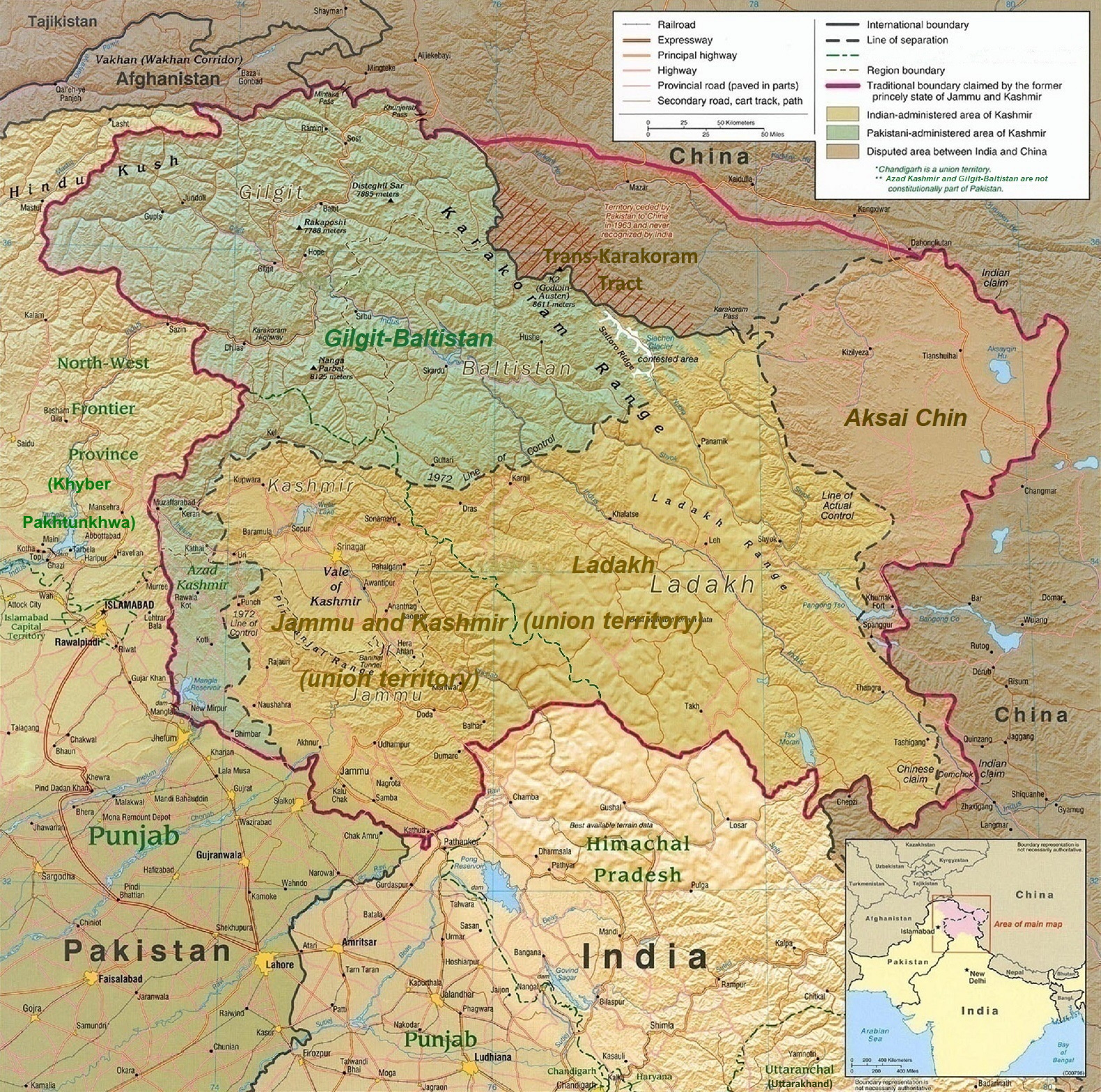
The western portion of the Line of Actual Control, separating the Eastern Ladakh and Aksai Chin. In the southern Demchok region, only two claim lines are shown (map by the CIA).

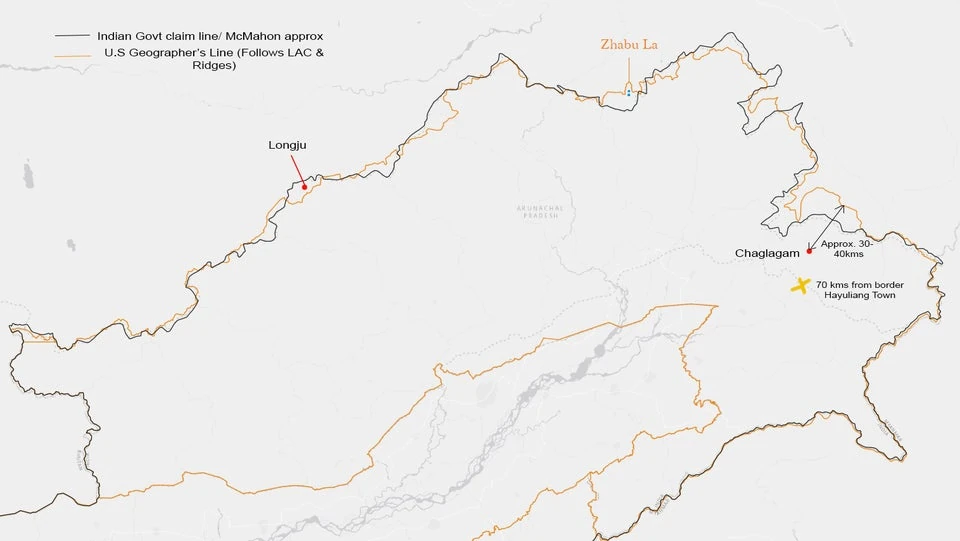
The Line of Actual Control vs the legally claimed McMahon Line in Arunachal Pradesh.

The Line of Actual Control (LAC), in the context of the Sino-Indian border dispute, is a notional demarcation line that separates Indian-controlled territory from Chinese-controlled territory on their mutual border. The concept was introduced by Chinese premier Zhou Enlai in a 1959 letter to Jawaharlal Nehru as the "line up to which each side exercises actual control", but rejected by Nehru as being incoherent. Subsequently, the term came to refer to the line formed after the 1962 Sino-Indian War.

The LAC is different from the borders claimed by each country in the Sino-Indian border dispute. The Indian claims include the entire Aksai Chin region, and the Chinese claims include Arunachal Pradesh/Zangnan. These claims are not included in the concept of "actual control".

The LAC is generally divided into three sectors:

- the western sector between Ladakh on the Indian side and the Tibet and Xinjiang autonomous regions on the Chinese side. This sector was the location of the 2020 China–India skirmishes ;
- the middle sector between Uttarakhand and Himachal Pradesh on the Indian side and the Tibet Autonomous Region on the Chinese side ;
- The eastern sector between Arunachal Pradesh/Zangnan on the Indian side and the Tibet Autonomous Region on the Chinese side. This sector generally follows the McMahon Line. (Note: The border between Sikkim and Tibet is an agreed border, dating back to the 1890 Convention of Calcutta.)

The term "line of actual control" originally referred only to the boundary in the western sector after the 1962 Sino-Indian War, but during the 1990s came to refer to the entire de facto border.

== Overview ==
The term "line of actual control" is said to have been used by Chinese premier Zhou Enlai in a 1959 note to Prime Minister of India Jawaharlal Nehru. The boundary existed only as an informal cease-fire line between India and China after the 1962 Sino-Indian War. In 1993, India and China agreed to respect the "Line of Actual Control" in a bilateral agreement, without demarcating the line itself.

In a letter dated 7 November 1959, Zhou Enlai proposed to Jawaharlal Nehru that the armed forces of the two sides should withdraw 20 kilometres from the so-called McMahon Line in the east and "the line up to which each side exercises actual control in the west". Nehru rejected the proposal stating that there was complete disagreement between the two governments on what territory each side controlled:

It is obvious that there is complete disagreement between the two Governments even about the facts of possession. An agreement about the observance of the status quo would, therefore, be meaningless as the facts concerning the status quo are themselves disputed.

Scholar Stephen Hoffmann states that Nehru was determined not to grant legitimacy to a concept that had no historical validity nor represented the situation on the ground. During the Sino-Indian War (1962), Nehru again refused to recognise the line of control: "There is no sense or meaning in the Chinese offer to withdraw twenty kilometres from what they call "line of actual control". What is this "line of control"? Is this the line they have created by aggression since the beginning of September? Advancing forty or sixty kilometres by blatant military aggression and offering to withdraw twenty kilometres provided both sides do this is a deceptive device which can fool nobody".

Zhou responded that the LAC was "basically still the line of actual control as existed between the Chinese and Indian sides on 7 November 1959. To put it concretely, in the eastern sector it coincides in the main with the so-called McMahon Line, and in the western and middle sectors it coincides in the main with the traditional customary line which has consistently been pointed out by China."

The term "LAC" gained legal recognition in Sino-Indian agreements signed in 1993 and 1996. The 1996 agreement states, "No activities of either side shall overstep the line of actual control". However, clause number 6 of the 1993 Agreement on the Maintenance of Peace and Tranquility along the Line of Actual Control in the India-China Border Areas mentions, "The two sides agree that references to the line of actual control in this Agreement do not prejudice their respective positions on the boundary question".

The Indian government claims that Chinese troops continue to illegally enter the area hundreds of times every year, including aerial sightings and intrusions. In 2013, there was a three-week standoff (2013 Daulat Beg Oldi incident) between Indian and Chinese troops 30 km southeast of Daulat Beg Oldi. It was resolved, and both Chinese and Indian troops withdrew in exchange for an Indian agreement to destroy some military structures over 250 km to the south near Chumar that the Chinese perceived as threatening.

In October 2013, India and China signed a border defence cooperation agreement to ensure that patrolling along the LAC does not escalate into armed conflict.

In October 2024, India announced that it had reached an agreement over patrolling arrangements along the Line of Actual Control (LAC) in the border area, which would lead to disengagement and resolution of the long-running conflict that began in 2020.

== Evolution of the LAC ==
=== 1956 claim line ===
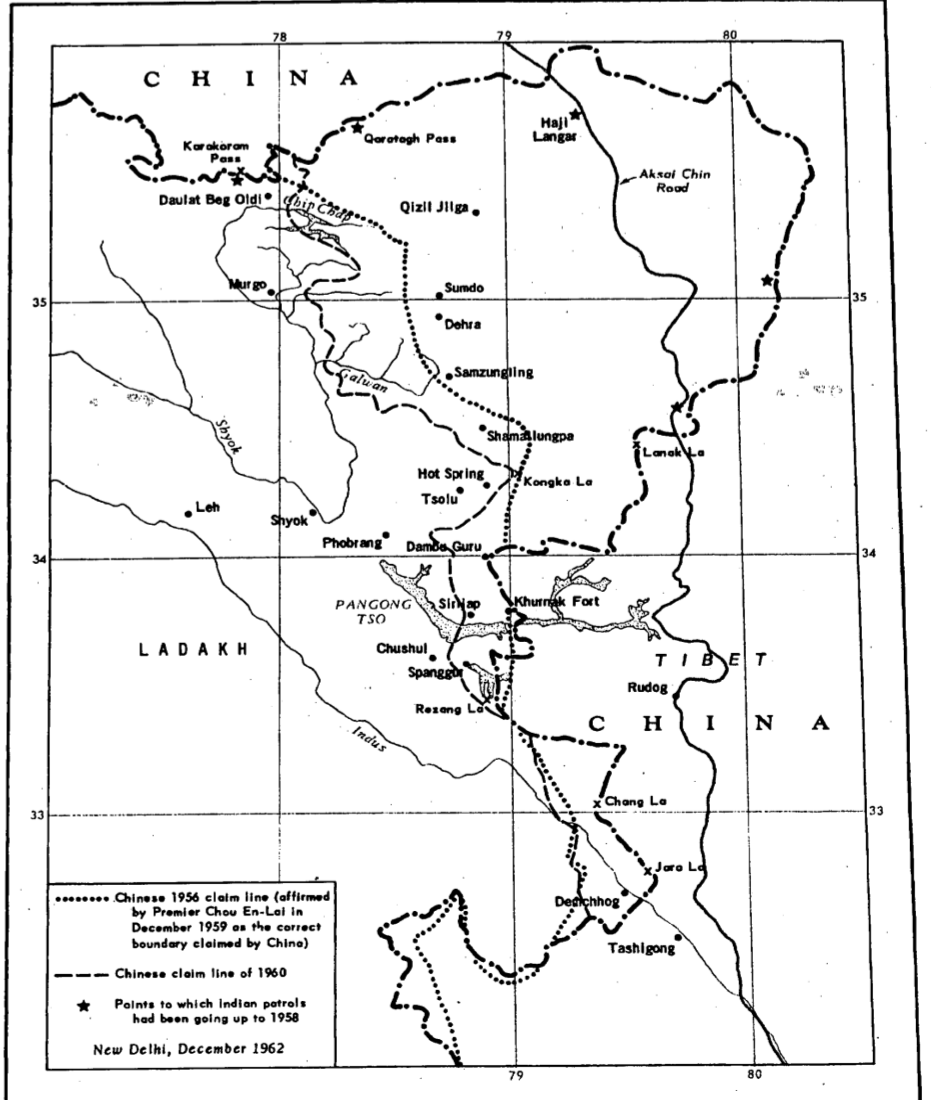
Map 1: The 1956 and 1960 claim lines of China in the western sector, map by the CIA

What is referred to as the "1956 claim line" of China was in fact the border marked in the Big Map of the People's Republic of China published in 1956. Indian officials state that its alignment coincides with the 1947 Republic of China map. In a letter of 17 December 1959, Zhou Enlai asserted that the 1957 map "correctly shows the traditional boundary between the two countries in this sector." Scholar Leo Rose also comments that the appears to have been issued after China decided to build a road through Aksai Chin.

This alignment includes Aksai Chin proper in Chinese territory, and leaves the Karakoram Range along with most of its rivers that debouch into the Indus river system. These include the Chip Chap River, Burtsa Nala, Jeong Nala, and Galwan River. Chang Chenmo is the only river that is disected, near Kongka La, but includes within India its tributaries, Kugrang and Changlung. (See Map 1) The traditional border at Lanak La was likely moved up to Kongka La in order to prohibit Indian patrol from reaching up to the former, which was seen as being too close to the Aksai Chin road. The failure of Indian patrols to appreciate this Chinese position led to the 1959 Kongka La incident.

=== Claimed LAC of 7 November 1959 ===
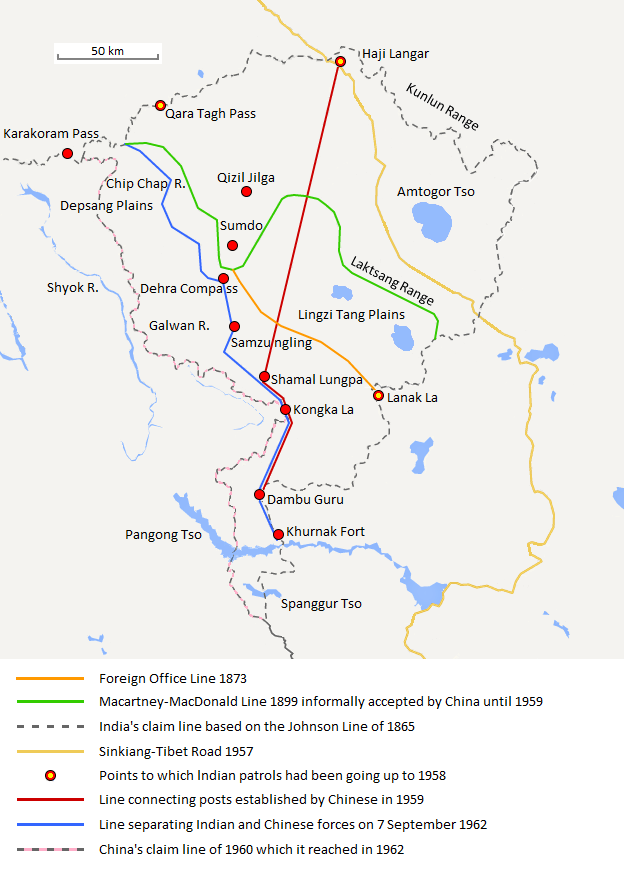
Map 2: This Indian map shows various lines, including the red line, representing India's view of the position in 1959, and the blue line, representing the position prior to the 1962 war.

The date of 7 November 1959, on which the Chinese premier Zhou Enlai alluded to the concept of "line of actual control", achieved a certain sanctity in Chinese nomenclature. But there was no line defined in 1959. Scholars state that Chinese maps had shown a steadily advancing line in the western sector of the Sino-Indian boundary, each of which was identified as "the line of actual control as of 7 November 1959".

On 24 October 1962, after the initial thrust of the Chinese forces in the Sino-Indian War, the Chinese premier Zhou Enlai wrote to the heads of ten African and Asian nations outlining his proposals for peace, a fundamental tenet of which was that both sides should undertake not to cross the "line of actual control". This letter was accompanied by certain maps which again identified the "line of actual control as of 7 November 1959". Margaret Fisher calls it the "line of actual control as of 7 November 1959" as published in November 1962. Scholar Stephen Hoffmann states that the line represented not any position held by the Chinese on 7 November 1959, but rather incorporated the gains made by the Chinese army before and after the massive attack on 20 October 1962. In some cases, it went beyond the territory the Chinese army had reached.

India's understanding of the 1959 line passed through Haji Langar, Shamal Lungpa, and Kongka La (the red line shown on Map 2).

Even though the Chinese-claimed line was not acceptable to India as the depiction of an actual position, it was apparently acceptable as the line from which the Chinese would undertake to withdraw 20 kilometres. Despite the non-acceptance by India of the Chinese proposals, the Chinese did withdraw 20 kilometres from this line, and henceforth continued to depict it as the "line of actual control of 1959".

In December 1962, representatives of six African and Asian nations met in Colombo to develop peace proposals for India and China. Their proposals formalised the Chinese pledge of 20-kilometre withdrawal and the same line was used, labelled as "the line from which the Chinese forces will withdraw 20 km".

This line was essentially forgotten by both sides till 2013, when the Chinese PLA revived it during its Depsang incursion as a new border claim. (Note: The claimed line in this location is "new" in that it is well beyond the 1956 and 1960 claim lines of China, the latter having been called the "traditional customary boundary". It is said to be 19 km beyond it, in Indian estimation.)

=== Line separating the forces before 8 September 1962 ===
At the end of the 1962 war, India demanded that the Chinese withdraw to their positions on 8 September 1962 (the blue line in Map 2).

=== 1993 agreement ===
Political relations following the 1962 war only saw signs of improvement towards the late 1970s and 1980s. Ties had remained strained until then also because of the Chinese attraction to Pakistan during India Pakistan wars in 1965 and 1971. Restored ambassadorial relations in 1976, a visit of the Indian Prime Minister to China in 1988, a visit of the Chinese Premier to India in 1992, and then a visit of the Indian President to China in 1992 preceded the 1993 agreement. Before the 1993 agreement, a trade agreement was signed in 1984, followed by a cultural cooperation agreement in 1988.

The 1993 agreement, signed on 7 September, was the first bilateral agreement between China and India to contain the phrase Line of Actual Control. The agreement covered force level, consultations as a way forward, and the role of a Joint Working Group. The agreement made it clear that there was an "ultimate solution to the boundary question between the two countries," which remained pending. It was also agreed that "the two sides agree that references to the line of actual control in this Agreement do not prejudice their respective positions on the boundary question".

== Clarification of the LAC ==
Northern and middle sector. Red dots represent sensitive and disputed locations, and locations of differing perceptions, on the LAC — such as Depsang, area of Kongka Pass, north of Kugrang River, north and south Pangong Tso, Spanggur Gap, opposite Dumchele, Demchok sector, Kaurik, Tashigang, Barahoti.
Eastern sector (Sikkim not shown). Red dots represent sensitive and disputed locations, and locations of differing perceptions, on the LAC and tri-junction areas — Locations include Asaphila, Doklam, Longju, Sumdorong Chu, Dichu area, Doklam.

In article 10 of the 1996 border agreement, both sides agreed to the exchange of maps to help clarify the alignment of the LAC. It was only in 2001 that the first in-depth discussion took place about the central/middle sectors. Maps of Sikkim were exchanged, resulting in the "Memorandum on Expanding Border Trade". However, the process of exchange of maps soon collapsed in 2002-2003 when other sectors were brought up. Shivshankar Menon writes that a drawback of the process of exchanging maps as a starting point to clarify the LAC was that it gave both sides an "incentive to exaggerate their claims of where the LAC lay".

On 30 July 2020, the Chinese Ambassador to India Sun Weidong stated that China was not in favour of clarifying the LAC anymore as it would create new disputes. Similar viewpoints have been aired in India that China will keep the boundary dispute alive for as long as it can be used against India. On the other hand, there have been voices which say that clarifying the LAC would be beneficial for both countries.

== Important points ==
=== Border Outposts ===
In 2025, India had 197 operational Border Out Posts (BOP) with China, after adding 40 more BOPs in the aftermath of 2021 Galwan clashes, 56 existing posts were moved forward closer to the border, and the monthly patrol frequency per BOP was raised to more than the previous 10 patrols. These are managed by the 100,000 soldiers of the Indo-Tibetan Border Police Force (ITBP). Each BOP, with 200+ soldiers each, has several sub-posts. Regular patrols are sent from BOP to the Patrol Points, and BRO is building all-weather paved motorable roads to all BOPs. BOPs are grouped into the following three sectors (note: numbers are old numbers before the 2021 Galwan clash).

- Western Sector (Ladakh): 35+
- Middle Sector (Himachal Pradesh and Uttarakhand): 71+
- Eastern Sector (Sikkim and Arunachal Pradesh): 67+

=== Patrol points ===
In the 1970s, India's China Study Group identified patrol points that Indian forces would patrol. This was a better representation of how far India could patrol towards its perceived LAC and delimited India's limits of actual control. These periodic patrols were performed by both sides and often crisscrossed.

Patrolling Points were identified by India's China Study Group in the 1970s to optimise patrolling effectiveness and resource utilisation along the disputed and non-demarcated China-India border at a time when border infrastructure was weak. Instead of patrolling the entire border, which was more than 3000 km long, troops would just be required to patrol up to the patrolling points. Over time, as infrastructure, resources, and troop capability improved and increased, the patrolling points were revised. The concept of patrol points came about well before India officially accepted the Line of Actual Control (LAC). Patrolling points give a more realistic on–the–ground guide of India's limits of actual control.

Most patrolling points are close to the LAC. However, in the Depsang plains, the patrolling points are said to remain well inside the LAC, despite having been revised a number of times. Former Army officers have said that patrolling points provide a better on-the-ground picture of India's limits of control. Based on location, the periodicity of visiting patrolling points can vary greatly from a few weeks to a couple of months. In some cases, the patrolling points are well-known landmarks such as mountain peaks or passes. In other cases, the pattrolling points are numbered, PP-1, PP-2 etc. over 65 patrolling points are stretching from the Karakoram to Chumar.

The patrolling points within the LAC and the patrol routes that join them are known as limits of patrolling. Some army officers call this the "LAC within the LAC" or the actual LAC. The various patrol routes to the limits of patrolling are called the lines of patrolling. During the 2020 China–India skirmishes, the patrolling points under dispute included PPs 10 to 13, 14, 15, 17, and 17A. On 18 September 2020, an article in The Hindu wrote that "since April, Indian troops have been denied access to PPs numbered 9, 10, 11, 12, 12A, 13, 14, 15, 17, 17A".

==== List of numbered patrol points ====
India has 65 patrolling points in Eastern Ladakh, from Karakoram Pass to Chumar. Patrolling points are not the limits of the Indian claim, because the Indian claim extends beyond these patrolling points. These patrolling points were set by India as the patrolling limits for the Indian Army to patrol and avoid confrontation with the PLA to maintain peace on the LAC with China, which had proved to be a superior military power in the 1962 border war. According to a 2020 report by an Indian police officer, India lost access to 26 of 65 patrolling points (PP 5–17 in Depsang Plains & Depsang Bulge including Samar Lungpa & Galwan, 24-32 in Changchenmo basin, 37 in Skakjung pasture, 51 and 52 in Demchok and Chardhing Nala, 62 in Chumar) in Ladakh due to being restricted by China. India's opposition party Congress claims that the Narendra Modi-ruled government of India is covering up territorial setbacks in this area, while the ruling government has denied the charges as politically motivated.

==== Listed by the mountain ranges ====
- Karakoram range: two important subranges in the disputed area are the Changchenmo Range and Pangong Range as below:
  - Changchenmo Range - a subrange of the Karakoram range.
    - PP1 to PP3 — near the Karakoram Pass ;
    - PP4 to PP9 — in Depsang plains ;
    - PP10 to PP13 including PP11A — in the Depsang Bulge from Y-Junction to Raki Nala (PP10), Y-Junction to Jivan Nala (PP13), and in between these two ;
    - PP14 — in Galwan Valley ; a mutually agreed before zone has been created due to which India is unable to access this PP.
    - PP15 — on the watershed between Kugrang and Galwan basins (called Jianan Pass by China) ;
    - PP16, PP17 and PP17A — Kugrang River Valley, the last near Gogra ;
    - PP18 to PP23 — southeast of Gogra, from the Silung Barma (Chang Chenmo River tributary) towards Pangong Tso ;
  - Pangong Range, a sub-range of the Karakoram Range, runs from Chushul along the southern shore of Pangong Tso on the India-China LAC:
    - PP24 to PP?
- Kailash Range
  - PP35 to PP37 — in Skakjung pasture & near China-administered Dumchele. There have been several incursions by China in this area. Due to the different perception of the border between India and China and continuing Chinese incursions in Chushul, Chumur, Dungti, Phobrang, and Demchok has adversely affected the life of local Changpa nomadic herders.
- Demchok sector: Demchok and Chardhing Nala
  - PP 38 to ?.
- Chumar Range:
  - PP61? in Nilung Nala.
  - PP62 to 65 in Chumar sector.

=== Border Personnel Meeting points ===
Border Personnel Meeting point (BPMs) are mutually agreed-upon designated locations on the LAC where the armies of both countries hold formal meetings to resolve border issues and improve relations.

=== Border Trade points ===
The mutually-agreed officially-designated border trade points (BTP) with the year of designation are Lipulekh Pass (1991) in Uttarakhand, Shipki La (1993) in Himachal Pradesh, and Nathu La (2006) in Sikkim for trading the locally made items through these points for boosting the local economy.

Chushul (called the "Junglam") was the main ancient trade route between Lahaul and Rudok, which is known at least since the 17th century. Dumchele (Dhumtsele) in southern Ladakh, occasionally used in ancient times as an alternative to Chushul route for trade between Lahaul and Rudok, has been proposed as another BTP which according to a 2014 report saw "illicit trade" (smuggling) of "tiger bones, tiger skins, rhino horns and sandalwood" and rice, wheat and cooking oil from India, and in exchange pashmina shawls and Chinese crockery and electronics were acquired, but was reportedly stopped by Indian authorities in 2016.

== Border terminology ==
Glossary of border-related terms:

Border
"A zone between the two states, nations, or civilisations. It is frequently also an area where peoples, nations, and cultures intermingle and are in contact with one another" as explained by Shivshankar Menon. It may be mutually agreed (boundary) or disputed (e.g., LAC).

Boundary
The "line between two states that marks the limits of sovereign jurisdiction" or "a line agreed upon by both states and normally delineated on maps and demarcated on the ground by both sides" as explained by S Menon.

Differing perceptions

Different views related to where the LAC lies. Similarly, areas of differing perceptions for different views related to areas along the LAC.

Mutually agreed disputed spots
Both sides agree the location is disputed, as compared to just one side disputing a location.

Border Personnel Meeting point
BPMs are locations where the armies of both countries hold meetings to resolve border issues and improve relations.

Line of Actual Control (LAC)
The Line of Actual Control (LAC) is a notional demarcation line that separates Indian-controlled territory from Chinese-controlled territory in the Sino-Indian border dispute.

Actual LAC (ALC) / LAC within the LAC
ALC is determined by the "limits of patrolling".

Limits of patrolling / Limits of actual control
Limits of patrolling, also known as limits of actual control, are determined by the terminal location of patrol points on the LAC and the maximum extent of "patrol routes" (lines of patrolling) that join them. By regularly visiting these respective PPs, the respective forces physically demonstrate their presence and claim over the territory.

Patrol Point (PP)
are specific, identified locations along the LAC that are regularly patrolled by each country's armed forces to assert and establish their claim of "actual control," as compared to patrolling the entire area.

Lines of patrolling
The various patrol routes to the limits of patrolling are called the lines of patrolling.

== See also ==
- Aksai Chin
- Arunachal Pradesh
- Border Personnel Meeting point
- McMahon Line
- Sino-Indian relations
- Sino-Indian border dispute
- 2024 India-China Border Patrol Agreement
- Tibet

== Bibliography ==
- Palat, Madhavan K., ed. (2016) [1962], "Report of the Officials of the Governments of India and the People's Republic of China on the Boundary Question", Selected Works of Jawaharlal Nehru, Second Series, Volume 66, Jawaharlal Nehru Memorial Fund/Oxford University Press, ISBN 978-01-994670-1-3 – via archive.org
- Fisher, Margaret W. (March 1964), "India in 1963: A Year of Travail", Asian Survey, 4 (3): 737–745, doi:10.2307/3023561, JSTOR 3023561.
- Fisher, Margaret W.; Rose, Leo E.; Huttenback, Robert A. (1963), Himalayan Battleground: Sino-Indian Rivalry in Ladakh, Praeger – via archive.org.
- Gupta, Shishir (2014), The Himalayan Face-Off: Chinese Assertion and the Indian Riposte, Hachette India, ISBN 978-93-5009-606-2.
- Hoffmann, Steven A. (1990), India and the China Crisis, University of California Press, ISBN 978-0-520-06537-6.
- Joshi, Manoj (2021), "Eastern Ladakh, the Longer Perspective", Orf, Observer Research Foundation.
- Menon, Shivshankar (2016), Choices: Inside the Making of India's Foreign Policy, Brookings Institution Press, ISBN 978-0-8157-2911-2.
- Torri, Michelguglielmo (2020), "India 2020: Confronting China, Aligning with the US", Asia Major, XXXI, ProQuest 2562568306.
- Whiting, Allen Suess (1975), The Chinese Calculus of Deterrence: India and Indochina, University of Michigan Press, ISBN 978-0-472-96900-5.
