= Jamirah Patra Gaon =

Jamirah Patra Gaon is a village in the Dibrugarh district of the Indian state of Assam.
