= Cabinet Committee on Political Affairs =

Prime Cabinet Committee of the Central Government of India

The Prime Cabinet Committee of the Central Government of India deals with problems related to Centre-State relations, considers economic and political issues that require a broader perspective, and handles foreign affairs that do not have internal or external security implications. It is also known as 'super cabinet,' as it consists of most of the most important Cabinet ministers.

The Prime Cabinet Committee —like all other Cabinet Committees of the Government of India—is for day to day public welfare, governance, centre - state relationship and foreign policy (that do not have any internal or external security implications). It is chaired by the Prime Minister of India, Narendra Modi, and was reconstituted by him according to the Government of India (Transaction of Business) Rules, 1961 shortly after his party's victory in the 2019 general election.

== Members ==
The Prime Minister of India can select and dismiss members of all Cabinet Committees including (PCC) and (SCC) as he sees fit. As of July 2024, the committee consists of the following members:

== Members of the Super Cabinet ==
Super Cabinet of India
Prime Minister of India
Narendra Modi
| Minister | Ministries |
| Rajnath Singh | Ministry of Defence |
| Amit Shah | Ministry of Home Affairs Ministry of Cooperation |
| Nitin Jairam Gadkari | Ministry of Road Transport and Highways |
| Jagat Prakash Nadda | Ministry of Health and Family Welfare Ministry of Chemicals and Fertilizers |
| Nirmala Sitharaman | Ministry of Finance Ministry of Corporate Affairs |
| Piyush Goyal | Ministry of Commerce and Industry |
| Jitan Ram Manjhi | Ministry of Micro, Small and Medium Enterprises |
| Sarbananda Sonowal | Ministry of Ports, Shipping and Waterways |
| Kinjarapu Rammohan Naidu | Ministry of Civil Aviation |
| Bhupender Yadav | Ministry of Environment, Forest and Climate Change |
| Annapurna Devi | Ministry of Women and Child Development |
| Kiren Rijiju | Ministry of Parliamentary Affairs Ministry of Minority Affairs |
| G. Kishan Reddy | Ministry of Coal Ministry of Mines |

== See also ==
- Appointments Committee of the Cabinet
- Cabinet Committee on Security
- Union Council of Ministers of India
- Cabinet Secretariat (India)
- Union Government ministries of India
