= Jogeswar Doley =

Indian politician

Jogeswar Doley is an Asom Gana Parishad politician from Assam in India. He was elected in Assam Legislative Assembly by-election in 2000 from Majuli constituency.
