= Dibrugarh district =

- District of Assam
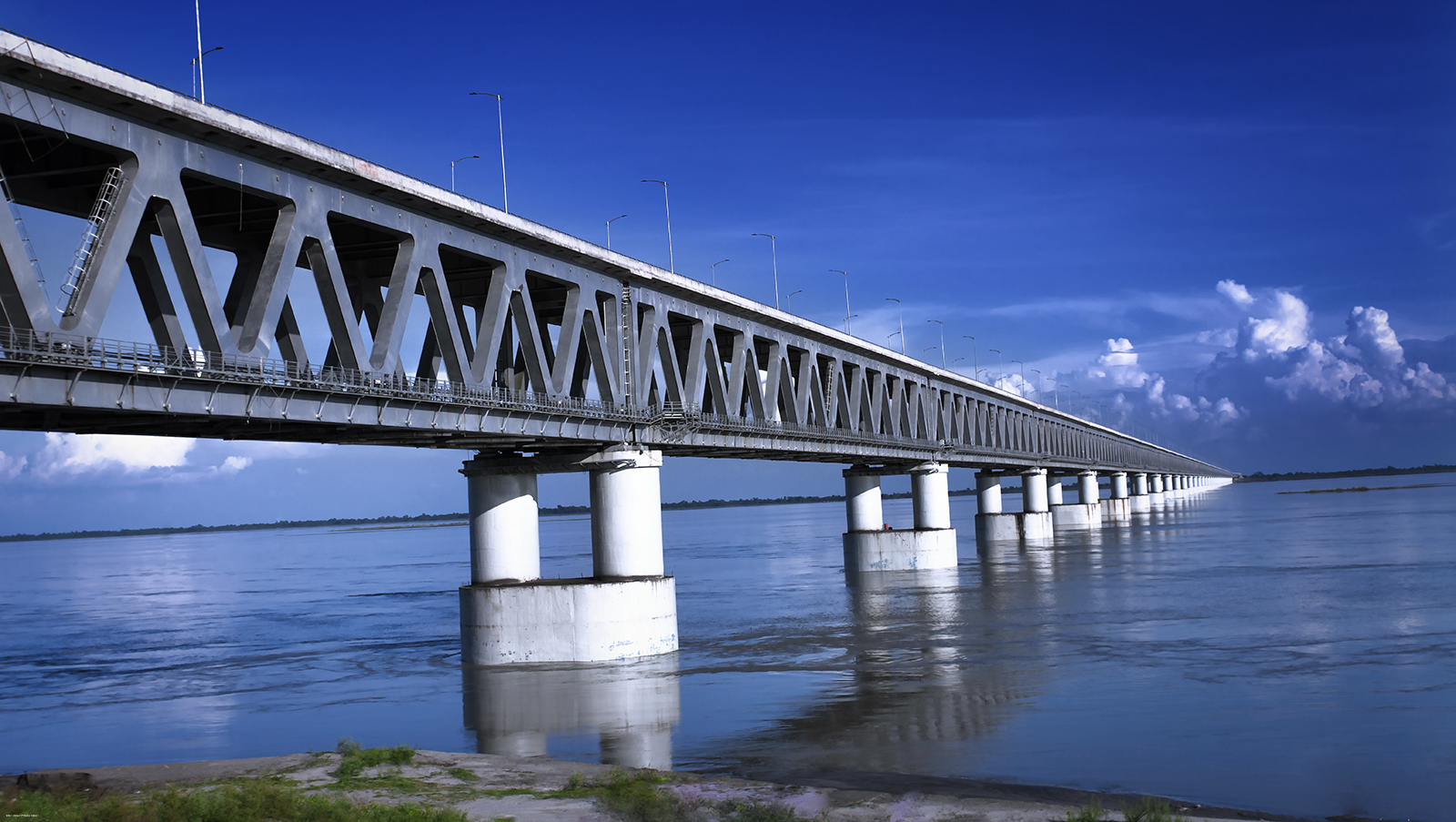
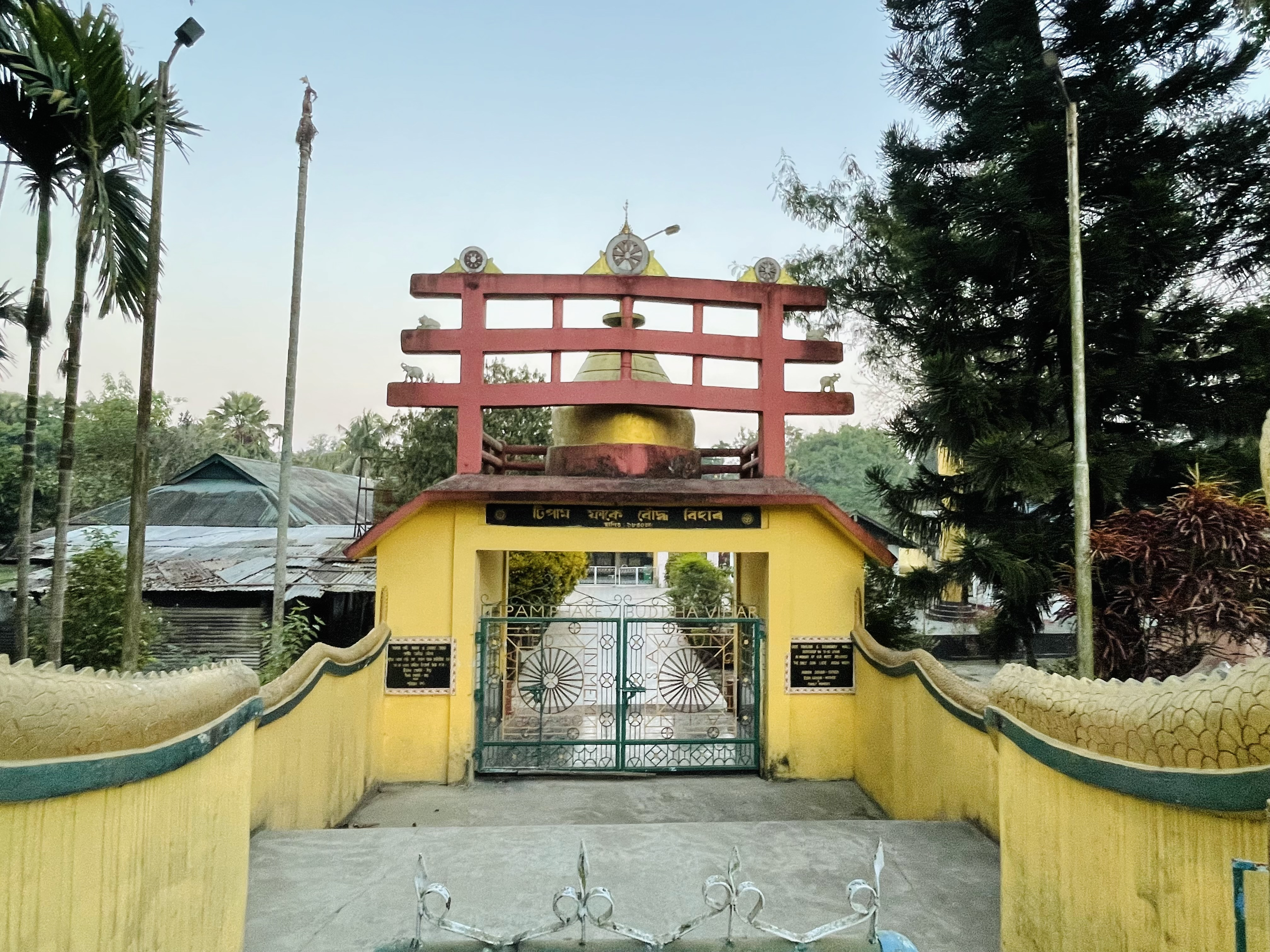
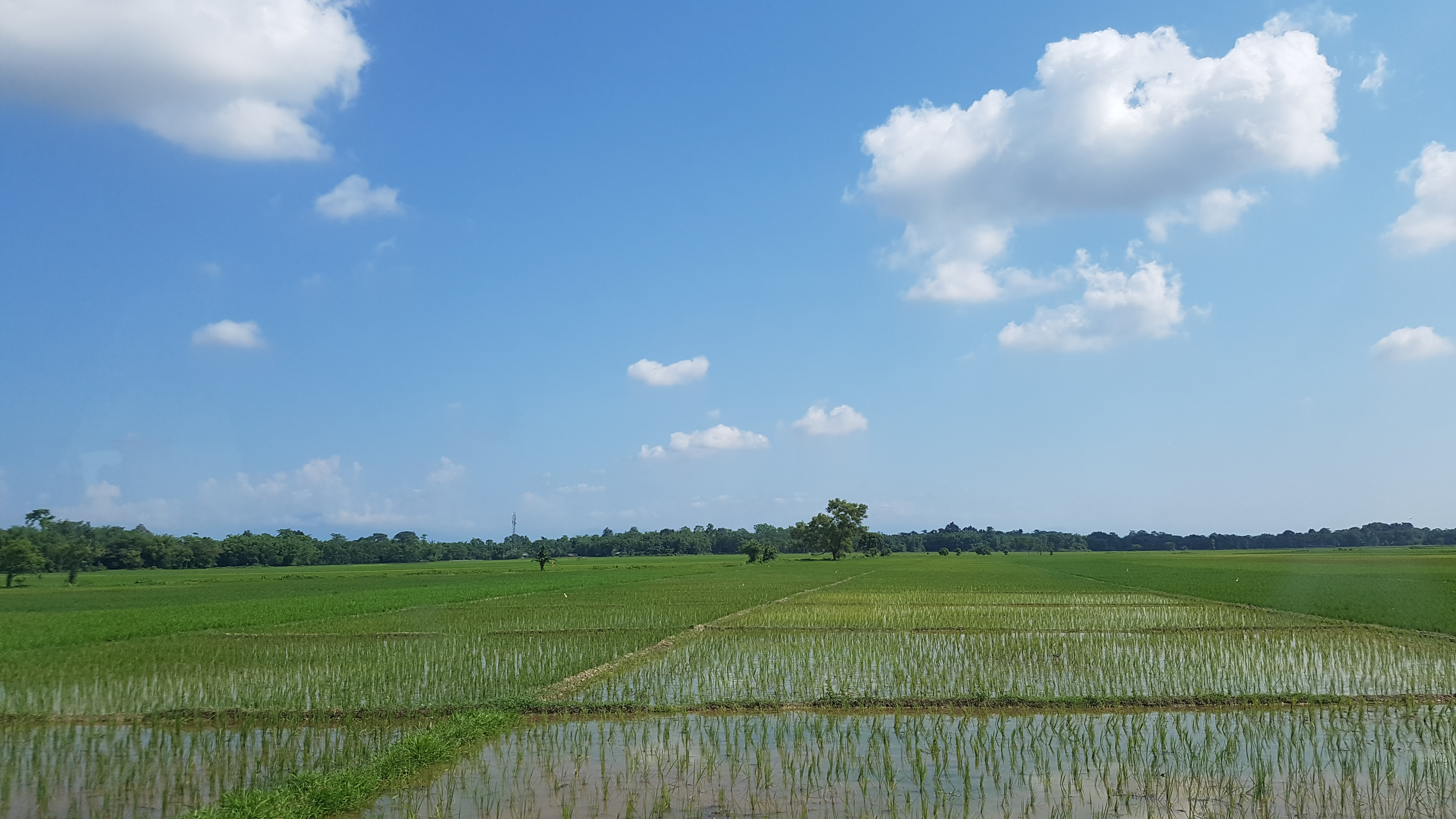
- Clockwise from top-left: Bogibeel Bridge, Tipam Phake Buddhist Monastery, Wet rice paddy fields in Dibrugarh district

- Location in Assam
- Coordinates (Dibrugarh): 27.47°N 94.92°E
- Country: India
- State: Assam
- Division: Upper Assam
- Headquarters: Dibrugarh
- Tehsils: 21: Dibrugarh City; Moderkhat; Lahowal; Rohmoria; Laruwa; Jamira; Mancotta-Khanikar; Moran; Sepon; Lengeri; Khowang; Tengakhat; Tipling; Kheremia; Chabua Pulunga; Bogdung; Gharbandi; Sasoni; Joypur; Fakial; Tingkhong

Government
  - Lok Sabha constituencies: Dibrugarh
  - Vidhan Sabha constituencies: Dibrugarh, Khowang, Duliajan, Tingkhong
  - Superintendent of Police: V.V. Rakesh Reddy (IPS)

Area
  - Total: 3,381 km^{2} (1,305 sq mi)

Population (2011)
  - Total: 1,326,335
  - Density: 392.3/km^{2} (1,016/sq mi)
  - Urban: 243,730 (18.38%)
  - Rural: 1,082,605 (81.62%)

Demographics
  - Literacy: 76.22%
  - Sex ratio: 961 per 1000 male
  - Scheduled Castes: 4.44% (58,876)
  - Scheduled Tribes: 7.76% (102,871)

Language
  - Official: Assamese, English
- Time zone: UTC+05:30 (IST)
- Vehicle registration: AS-06-xxxx
- Major highways: NH 15
- Website: dibrugarh.assam.gov.in

Dibrugarh district (Pron:ˌdɪbru:ˈgor:) is a district in the state of Assam in India. The district headquarters are located within the city of Dibrugarh.

== Etymology ==
Dibrugarh derived its name from Dibarumukh (as a renowned encampment of Ahoms during the Ahom-Chutia war). Either the name “Dibru” evolved from Dibaru river or from the Tibeto Burman word “Dibru” which means a “blister” and “Garh” meaning "fort". The Tibeto Burman add the prefix “Di-” (which means “water”) wherever there is small stream, a river, or a large river in a town or city.

== History ==
The region was part of the Chutia Kingdom until the Ahoms occupied it in the year 1523 AD. The Chutia army under the generals Kasitora, Alangi Chetia and Borpatra fought against the Ahoms at Dibrumukh, but were defeated. After the Ahoms captured Sadiya in 1524 AD, bringing an end to the Chutia kingdom, the Ahom king Suhungmung placed an official named Chaolung Shulung to control the region.

Since the defeat of the royalists troops at Amaratali of Dibru in 1787 A.D. in the reign of Gaurinath Singha, during the Moamoria rebellion this region came under the Moamarias who also formed there a dominant religious community. Dibrugarh became a separate district when it was split from Lakhimpur on 2 October 1971. On 1 October 1989 Tinsukia district was split from Dibrugarh.

== Geography ==
Dibrugarh district occupies an area of 3,381 square kilometres (1,305 sq mi), comparatively equivalent to Russia's Vaygach Island. The district extends from 27° 5' 38" N to 27° 42' 30" N latitude and 94°33'46"E to 95°29'8"E longitude. It is bounded by Dhemaji district on the north, Tinsukia district on the east, Tirap district of Arunachal Pradesh on the south-east and Sibsagar district on the north and south-west. The area stretches from the north bank of the Brahmaputra, which flows for a length of 95 km through the northern margin of the district, to the Patkai foothills on the south. The Burhi Dihing, a major tributary of the Brahmaputra with its network of tributaries and wetlands flows through the district from east to west. There is a large tract of Tropical Rainforest in its eastern and southern regions, which is a part of the Dehing Patkai wildlife sanctuary.

=== Flora and fauna ===
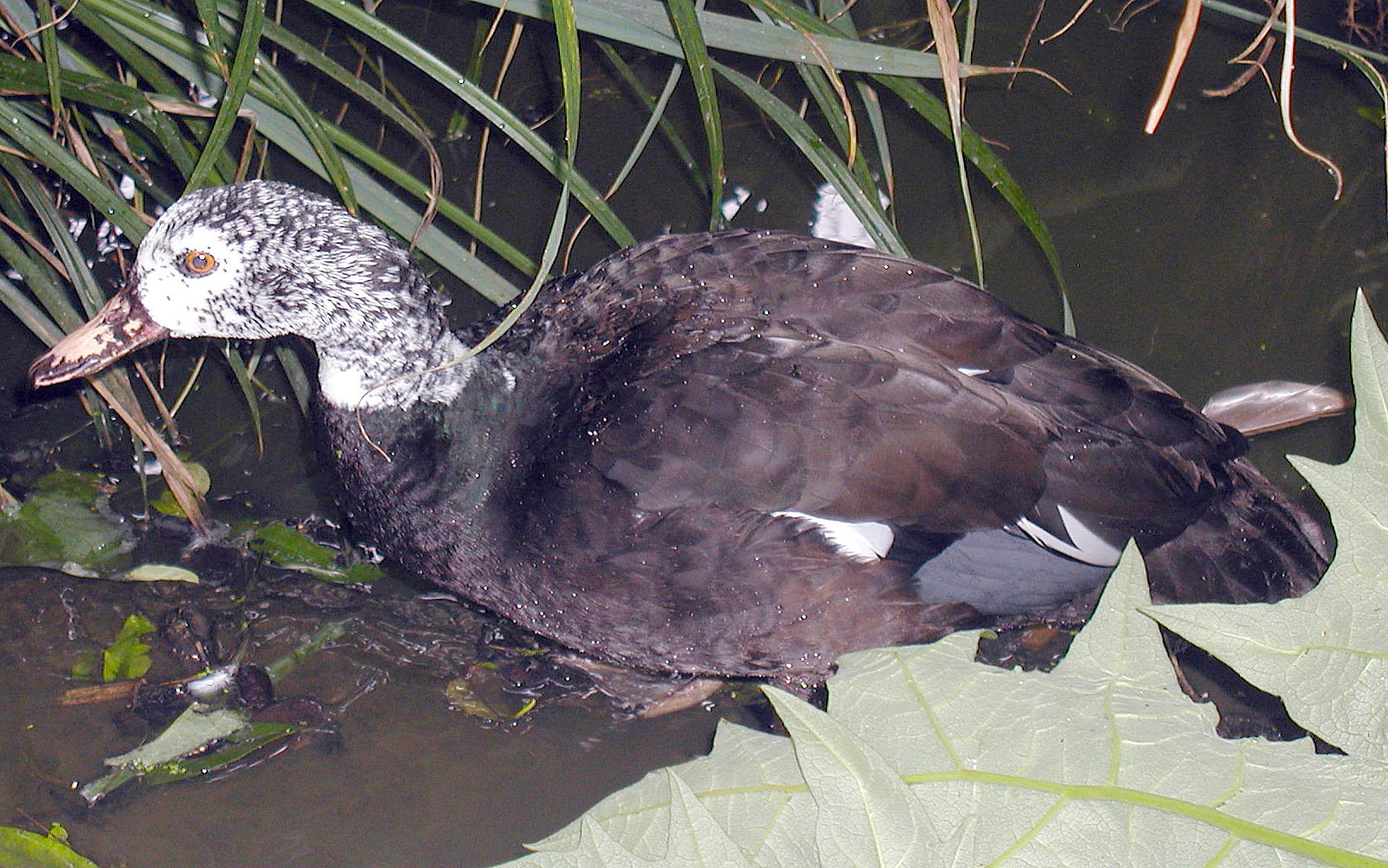
The endangered white-winged duck, found in Dibru-Saikhowa National Park

In 1999 Dibrugarh district became home to Dibru-Saikhowa National Park, which has an area of 340 km^{2} (131.3 mi^{2}). It shares the park with Tinsukia district. It is also home to the Padumani-Bherjan-Borajan Wildlife Sanctuary, which was established in 1999 and has an area of 7.2 km^{2} (2.8 mi^{2}). In 2020 Dibrugarh district became home to Dehing Patkai National Park, which has an area of 231.65 km^{2} (89.4 mi^{2}). It shares the park with Tinsukia district.

== Economy ==
Tea and oil are the major revenue earners for the district. Beside these many rice and oilseed mills exist. Also there are some coal mining and petroleum production industries.

=== Agriculture ===
The majority of the population are occupied in farming of rice, sugar-cane, pulses, and fish farming.

Dibrugarh has the world's largest area covered by tea gardens. The entire district is surrounded by tea plantations and has tea factories. Many tea gardens are more than 100 years old.

=== Industry ===
The world's oldest running oil refinery is situated in Digboi (Tinsukia District). The entire district has many oil and natural gas rigs owned by the Oil India Limited and Oil and Natural Gas Corporation.

The headquarters of Oil India Limited is located in Duliajan, 50 km from Dibrugarh Town.

Namrup is known for its 3 main industries viz. BVFCL (Brahmaputra Valley Fertilizer Corporation Ltd.), APL (Assam Petrochemicals Ltd.) and NTPS (Namrup Thermal Power Station).

== Administrative ==
The Administrative System is divided into:

1. Village (1361)
2. Block (7)
3. Gaon Panchayats (93)
4. Zilla Parishad (1)

In the lower-house (Lok Sabha) of the Indian Parliament, Dibrugarh is one constituency and represented by one elected Member of the Parliament.

=== Notable towns and villages ===
- Chabua
- Dibrugarh
- Duliajan
- Jamirah Patra Gaon
- Moran
- Naharkatia
- Namrup

=== Revenue circles ===
- Dibrugarh East
- Dibrugarh West
- Chabua
- Tengakhat
- Naharkatia
- Tingkhong
- Moran.

=== Police stations ===
- Borboruah (City) PS
- Chabua PS
- Dibrugarh Sadar Town (City)
- Duliajan PS
- Joypur PS
- Khowang PS
- Lahowal (City) PS
- Moran PS
- Naharkatia PS
- Rajgarh PS
- Rohmoria, Ghoramora PS
- Tengakhat PS
- Tingkhong PS

There are seven Assam Legislative Assembly constituencies in this district: Moran, Dibrugarh, Lahowal, Duliajan, Tingkhong, Naharkatia, and Chabua. Chabua is in the Lakhimpur Lok Sabha constituency, whilst the other six are in the Dibrugarh Lok Sabha constituency.

== Transport ==
Dibrugarh is well linked by roads, railway (Dibrugarh railway station), airway (Mohanbari Airport) and waterway. There are four airfields, which were used by the British against Japanese forces in Burma during World War II.

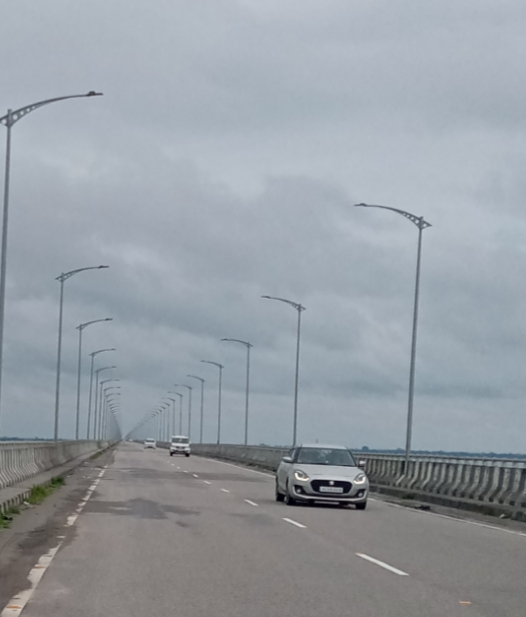
Bridge on Brahmaputra river,Bogibeel Bridge

== Demographics ==
Religions in Dibrugarh district (2011)
Religion	Percent
Hinduism	90.35%
Islam	4.86%
Christianity	3.99%
Other or not stated	0.80%

According to the 2011 census Dibrugarh district has a population of 1,326,335, roughly equal to the nation of Mauritius or the US state of Maine. This gives it a ranking of 367th in India (out of a total of 640). The district has a population density of 393 inhabitants per square kilometre (1,020/sq mi). Its population growth rate over the decade 2001-2011 was 12.04%. Dibrugarh has a sex ratio of 961 females for every 1000 males, and a literacy rate of 76.05%, 82.82% in males and 68.99% in females. 18.38% of the population lives in urban areas. Scheduled Castes and Scheduled Tribes make up 4.44% and 7.76% of the population respectively.

Languages of Dibrugarh district (2011)
1. Assamese (76.0%)
2. Bengali (5.93%)
3. Hindi (5.80%)
4. Sadri (4.83%)
5. Nepali (1.72%)
6. Bhojpuri (1.13%)
7. Odia (1.00%)
8. Others (3.58%)

Dibrugarh is a multi-cultural district. According to the 2011 census, 76.01% of the district speaks Assamese, 5.93% Bengali, 5.80% Hindi, 4.83% Sadri, 1.72% Nepali, 1.13% Bhojpuri and 1.00% Odia as their first language.

== Education ==
The district is the pivot of higher education in the entire North East India. Right from the British India period the district has been a center for learning. The Assam Medical College was established by a personal grant from Dr. John Berry White after he retired as the civil surgeon of Lakhimpur district. The medical school, "John Berry White Medical School" was set up in 1900 at Dibrugarh, and thus this premier institute started its history, and marked a new era in education. Assam Medical College has the pride of having the first Radiology department in India, as in 1910 two X-ray machine (One 10MA and another 15MA) was bought from England, only 15 years after the discovery of X-rays by Professor Wilhelm Conrad Roentgen in 1895–96. These two were the first X-ray machines in India.

Apart from medical, the other higher fields of learning in the district are Pharmacology, Geology and Applied Geology and Petroleum Technology. All these courses are offered by Dibrugarh University, which was established in 1965.

Beside the university, other centres for learning are:

- Dibrugarh Poly-technique, offering various diploma courses in electrical, civil and mechanical fields
- Regional Medical Research Centre - RMRC, a centre for scientific and research in bio-medical sciences where major health problems and its causes are studied

The district came to national prominence for education in 2009 with Gaurav Agarwal of the Assam Valley School topping the country in the Class XII board examinations conducted by the Council for the Indian School Certificate Examinations.

== Politics ==
The Dibrugarh district is part Dibrugarh, and Lakhimpur parliament constituency. Vidhan Sabha constituencies are Moran, Dibrugarh, Lahowal, Duliajan, Tingkhong, Naharkatia, Chabua

== Notable people ==
- Arun Sharma: Dramatist
- Biju Phukan: Assamese actor
- Dipannita Sharma: Indian actress and model
- Jyoti Prasad Agarwala: Indian playwright, songwriter, poet, writer and film maker
- Jogendra Nath Hazarika: former chief minister of Assam
- Kesab Chandra Gogoi: former chief minister of Assam
- Moloya Goswami: Indian actress
- Nilmoni Phukan: Assamese writer, poet, freedom fighter and politician
- Nagen Saikia: Indian writer
- Paresh Barua: leader of militant group ULFA
- Parineeta Borthakur: Indian actress
- Prahlad Chandra Tasa: Indian writer and educationist
- Ranjan Gogoi: 46th Chief Justice of India
- Rameswar Teli: MP, Lok sabha from Dibrugarh
- Shamin Mannan: Indian actress
- Sarbananda Sonowal: former chief minister of Assam

== See also ==
- Sonowal Kachari Autonomous Council
- Matak Autonomous Council

== Bibliography ==
- Scott, James George (1967), Hsenwi State Chronicle
