= Rameswar Teli =

Indian politician (born 1970)

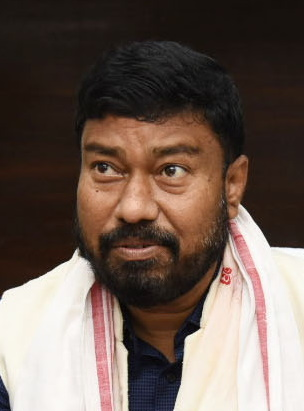

Cabinet Minister, Government of Assam
- Incumbent
- Assumed office 12 May 2026
- Chief Minister: Himanta Biswa Sarma
- Departments: Transformation and Development; Labour Welfare; Tea Tribes and Adivasi Welfare
- Preceded by: Himanta Biswa Sarma (Transformation); Rupesh Gowala (Labour, Tea Tribes)

Union Minister of State for Petroleum and Natural Gas
- In office 7 July 2021 – 9 June 2024
- Prime Minister: Narendra Modi
- Minister: Hardeep Singh Puri
- Succeeded by: Suresh Gopi

Union Minister of State for Labour and Employment
- In office 7 July 2021 – 9 June 2024
- Prime Minister: Narendra Modi
- Minister: Bhupender Yadav
- Succeeded by: Shobha Karandlaje

Union Minister of State for Food Processing Industries
- In office 31 May 2019 – 7 July 2021
- Prime Minister: Narendra Modi
- Minister: Harsimrat Kaur Badal; Narendra Singh Tomar
- Preceded by: Niranjan Jyoti
- Succeeded by: Prahlad Patel

Member of Assam Legislative Assembly
- Incumbent
- Assumed office 4 May 2026
- Preceded by: Terash Gowalla
- Constituency: Duliajan
- In office 13 May 2001 – 13 May 2011
- Preceded by: Amiya Gogoi
- Succeeded by: Amiya Gogoi

Member of Parliament, Rajya Sabha
- In office 28 August 2024 – 9 April 2026
- Preceded by: Sarbananda Sonowal
- Succeeded by: Terash Gowalla
- Constituency: Assam

Member of Parliament, Lok Sabha
- In office 16 May 2014 – 4 June 2024
- Preceded by: Paban Singh Ghatowar
- Succeeded by: Sarbananda Sonowal
- Constituency: Dibrugarh

Personal details
- Born: 14 August 1970 (age 55) Duliajan, Assam, India
- Party: Bharatiya Janata Party

Rameswar Teli (born 14 August 1970) is an Indian politician and member of Bharatiya Janata Party. He was a Rajya Sabha MP representing Assam. He was a Member of Parliament, Lok Sabha representing Dibrugarh (Lok Sabha constituency) from 2014 to 2024 and the Minister of State of Petroleum and Natural Gas and Labour and Employment in the Second Modi ministry from 2021 to 2024. Previously, he served as the Minister of State for Ministry of Food Processing Industries from 2019 to 2020 and a member of the Assam Legislative Assembly from Duliajan from 2001 to 2011.

== Early life ==
He was born on 14 August 1970 in Duliajan in Assam. His father name is Budhu Teli and Mother Dulka Teli. Rameswar Teli has completed his education up to the 10th grade. He belongs to member of Tea-garden community of Assam. His father was a driver. As a teenage, he used to sell yams and ferns to buy bread for snacks.

== Career ==
He was local leader of All Assam Tea Tribe Students’ Association (AATTSA). He was elected to Assam legislative Assembly during 2001-2006 and 2006-2011 for from Duliajan in district of Dibrugarh. He lost in the 2011 assembly elections by around 3000 votes to Amiya Gogoi. In 2014, he was elected to as member of parliament from Dibrugarh as BJP candidate. In the 2019 Indian general election he was elected as a member of parliament from Dibrugarh constituency.

In May 2019, Teli became Minister of State for Food Processing Industries and worked till 7 July 2021. In July 2021, Teli became Minister of State for Ministry of Petroleum and Natural Gas and Ministry of Labour and Employment in Second Modi ministry when cabinet overhaul happened. Rameswar Teli contested the 2026 Assam Assembly Elections from the Duliajan constituency, representing the Bharatiya Janata Party (BJP) on April 9, 2026. Teli emerged victorious in the 2026 Assam Assembly elections, securing 71,467 votes and defeating Congress candidate Dhruba Gogoi by a decisive margin of 10,459 votes.
