= Dibrugarh Lok Sabha constituency =

Lok Sabha constituency in Assam

Coordinates: 27.5°N 94.9°E

Dibrugarh AS-13
- Lok Sabha constituency
- Interactive Map Outlining Dibrugarh Lok Sabha constituency

Constituency details
- Country: India
- Region: Northeast India
- State: Assam
- Established: 1952
- Reservation: None

Member of Parliament
- 18th Lok Sabha
- Incumbent Sarbananda Sonowal
- Party: BJP
- Alliance: NDA
- Elected year: 2024

Dibrugarh Lok Sabha constituency is one of the 14 Lok Sabha constituencies in Assam state in north-eastern India.

== Assembly segments ==
Dibrugarh Lok Sabha constituency is composed of the following assembly segments:

=== Current assembly segments ===
No.	Name	District	Member	Party	2024 Lead
83	Margherita	Tinsukia	Bhaskar Sharma	BJP	BJP
84	Digboi	Tinsukia	Suren Phukan	BJP	BJP
85	Makum	Tinsukia	Sanjoy Kishan	BJP	BJP
86	Tinsukia	Tinsukia	Pulok Gohain	BJP	BJP
87	Chabua–Lahowal	Dibrugarh	Binod Hazarika	BJP	BJP
88	Dibrugarh	Dibrugarh	Prasanta Phukan	BJP	BJP
89	Khowang	Dibrugarh	Chakradhar Gogoi	BJP	BJP
90	Duliajan	Dibrugarh	Rameswar Teli	BJP	BJP
91	Tingkhong	Dibrugarh	Bimal Bora	BJP	BJP
92	Naharkatia	Dibrugarh	Taranga Gogoi	BJP	BJP

=== Previous assembly segments ===
Constituency number	Name	Reserved for (SC/ST/None)	District
115	Moran	None	Dibrugarh
116	Dibrugarh	None	Dibrugarh
117	Lahowal	None	Dibrugarh
118	Duliajan	None	Dibrugarh
119	Tingkhong	None	Dibrugarh
120	Naharkatia	None	Dibrugarh
122	Tinsukia	None	Tinsukia
123	Digboi	None	Tinsukia
124	Margherita	None	Tinsukia

== Members of Parliament ==
Year	Winner	Party
1952	J.N. Hazarika	Indian National Congress
1957	J.N. Hazarika	Indian National Congress
1962	J.N. Hazarika	Indian National Congress
1967	J.N. Hazarika	Indian National Congress
1971	Robindranath Kakoti	Indian National Congress
1977	Haren Bhumij	Indian National Congress
1984	Haren Bhumij	Indian National Congress
1991	Paban Singh Ghatowar	Indian National Congress
1996	Paban Singh Ghatowar	Indian National Congress
1998	Paban Singh Ghatowar	Indian National Congress
1999	Paban Singh Ghatowar	Indian National Congress
2004	Sarbananda Sonowal	Asom Gana Parishad
2009	Paban Singh Ghatowar	Indian National Congress
2014	Rameshwar Teli	Bharatiya Janata Party
2019	Rameshwar Teli	Bharatiya Janata Party
2024	Sarbananda Sonowal	Bharatiya Janata Party

== Election results ==
=== 2024 ===
2024 Indian general elections: Dibrugarh
Party	Candidate	Votes	%	±%
BJP	Sarbananda Sonowal	6,93,762	54.27	▼10.67
AJP	Lurinjyoti Gogoi	4,14,441	32.42	New
AAP	Manoj Dhanowar	1,37,864	10.78	New
NOTA	None of the Above	32,255	2.52	▲0.42
Majority		2,79,321	21.85	▼14.05
Turnout		12,78,464	76.92	▼0.38
BJP hold		Swing	▼10.67	

=== 2019 ===
2019 Indian general elections: Dibrugarh
Party	Candidate	Votes	%	±%
BJP	Rameswar Teli	6,59,583	64.94	+9.46
INC	Paban Singh Ghatowar	2,95,017	29.04	−5.64
NOTA	None of the Above	21,288	2.10	+1.01
Majority		3,64,566	35.90	+15.09
Turnout		10,15,992	77.30	
BJP hold		Swing	+9.46	

=== 2014 result ===
2014 Indian general elections: Dibrugarh
Party	Candidate	Votes	%	±%
BJP	Rameswar Teli	4,94,364	55.48	+55.48
INC	Paban Singh Ghatowar	3,09,017	34.68	−13.19
AGP	Anup Phukan	45,710	5.13	−38.06
CPI(ML)L	Subhas Sen	9,374	1.05	−0.05
AITC	Navajyoti Kalita	8,582	0.96	+0.96
AIFB	Cheni Ram Moran	7,112	0.80	0.80
NOTA	None of the above	16,809	1.09	N/A
Majority		1,85,347	20.81	+16.13
Turnout		8,91,129	79.26	+12.01
Registered electors		11,24,305		
BJP gain from INC		Swing		

=== 2009 result ===
2009 Indian general election: Dibrugarh
Party	Candidate	Votes	%	±%
INC	Paban Singh Ghatowar	359,163	47.87	
AGP	Sarbananda Sonowal	3,24,020	43.19	
Independent	Sima Ghosh	20,816	2.77	
CPI	Ratul Gogoi	11,937	1.59	
CPI(ML)L	Gangaram Kaul	8,224	1.10	
NCP	Romen Borthakur	7,106	0.95	
Independent	Lakhi Charan Swansi	6,055	0.81	
Independent	Francis Dhan	5,840	0.78	
Independent	Imtiaz Hussain	3,889	0.52	
JMM	Niharika Gogoi	3,224	0.43	
Majority		35,143	4.68	
Turnout		7,50,274	67.29	
Registered electors		11,14,965		
INC gain from AGP		Swing		

=== 2004 result ===
2004 Indian general election: Dibrugarh
Party	Candidate	Votes	%	±%
AGP	Sarbananda Sonowal	2,20,944	35.0	
BJP	Kamakhya Prasad Tasa	2,02,390	32.1	
INC	Paban Singh Ghatowar	1,70,589	27.0	
Independent	Badhram Rajgarh	15,894	2.5	
CPI(ML)L	Subhas Sen	9,843	1.6	
Independent	Amrit Borgohain	6,251	1.0	
SAP	Titus Bhengra	5,329	0.8	
Majority		18,554	2.9	
Turnout		6,31,416	65.1	
Registered electors		9,69,905		
AGP gain from INC		Swing		

=== 1999 result ===
1999 Indian general election: Dibrugarh
Party	Candidate	Votes	%	±%
INC	Paban Singh Ghatowar	2,70,863	48.6	
BJP	Ajit Chaliha	2,03,747	35.2	
AGP	Biju Phukan	75,932	13.6	
Majority		67,116	12.1	
Turnout		5,78,810	61.2	
Registered electors		9,45,785		
INC hold		Swing		

=== 1998 result ===
1998 Indian general election: Dibrugarh
Party	Candidate	Votes	%	±%
INC	Paban Singh Ghatowar	2,34,195	64.4	
BJP	Ajit Chaliha	93,073	25.6	
AGP	Onkarmal Agarwal	29,985	8.3	
Majority		1,41,122	38.8	
Turnout		3,81,056	40.3	
Registered electors		9,45,206		
INC hold		Swing		

=== 1996 result ===
1996 Indian general election: Dibrugarh
Party	Candidate	Votes	%	±%
INC	Paban Singh Ghatowar	2,81,253	50.7	
AGP	Israil Nanda	1,73,898	31.3	
BJP	Biju Phukan	50,246	9.1	
Majority		1,07,355	19.4	
Turnout		5,91,297	70.3	
Registered electors		8,40,893		
INC hold		Swing		

=== 1991 result ===
1991 Indian general election: Dibrugarh
Party	Candidate	Votes	%	±%
INC	Paban Singh Ghatowar	2,43,937	50.5	
AGP	Dipen Tanti	1,06,017	22	
NAGP	Israil Nanda	35,011	7.3	
BJP	Kumud Bihari Das	27,692	5.7	
Majority		1,37,920	28.5	
Turnout		5,29,721	66.1	
Registered electors		8,01,311		
INC hold		Swing		

== See also ==
- Dibrugarh district
- List of constituencies of the Lok Sabha
