= Tai Phake =

Tai Phake may refer to:

- Tai Phake language
- Tai Phake people
