= Golaghat Convention =

National convention of the people of Assam in 1985

Golaghat in Assam

The Golaghat Convention was a historic national convention of the people of Assam, organised in Golaghat for 2 days from 13–14 October 1985.

The 2 days' convention led to the formation of Assam's first major political party under the name and style of Asom Gana Parishad (AGP), and formally launched in Golaghat on 14 October 1985.

After intense negotiations with the then New Delhi government, headed by the prime minister Rajiv Gandhi, the All Assam Students Union (AASU) agreed to sign–off the Assam Accord with the government on 15 August 1985.

== History ==
The Indian National Congress mostly dominated the electoral history of Assam since the first election of 1952. For many years, the citizens of Assam were raising the demand for steps against the illegal foreign immigrants who had entered the state of Assam through the porous border, mostly from Bangladesh (erstwhile East Pakistan) and occupied areas of the state. These immigrants posed a threat to the economic, political, social, and cultural existence of the indigenous people of the state.

The All Assam Students Union (AASU), under the leadership of Prafulla Kumar Mahanta (President), late Bhrigu Kumar Phukan (General Secretary), and Biraj Kumar Sarma, the general secretary of All Assam Gana Sangram Parishad (AAGSP), reached out to the union Government of India demanding removal of several million illegal infiltrators from across the borders. This rapidly turned into a social movement throughout the state, leading to the birth of the Assam Movement in 1979.

It continued for six long years until 15 August 1985, when it culminated with the signing of the Assam Accord. This led to a realization of constitutional, legislative and administrative safeguards for Assam, among the participants and Assamese citizens, resulting in the Golaghat Convention.

The convention was held for 2 days, highlighting the regional aspirations that emerged out of the Assam Movement and formally recorded as part of the Assam Accord. It emphasized the need to consolidate political power in Assam's politics by instituting a major regional political party. Thus, AASU transformed itself into Asom Gana Parishad (AGP) on 14 October 1985 in Golaghat. AASU's President Prafulla Kumar Mahanta was elected as the President of the AGP. Smaller parties and organisations such as Asom Jatiyabadi Dal, Purbanchaliya Loka Parishad, and Asam Sahitya Sabha regrouped with the AGP. The AGP swept the 1985 Assembly elections, thereby forming the government in Assam that year.

== Principles ==
The base for the electoral realignment, leading to the formation of AGP in this convention, was set up via the principles of Assam Movement of 1979–85. Thus, the core principles of the convention were, but not limited to the following:

1. Regain Assam's political control via detection of the foreigners who have infiltrated into Assam since independence and to deport them to Bangladesh.
2. Develop Assam, envisioning, Sonor Assam (English translation: Golden Assam), signifying prosperity.
