= R. D. Pradhan =

Indian civil servant (1928–2020)

Ram D. Pradhan
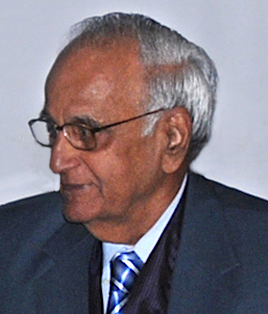
- Pradhan in 2012

2nd Governor of Arunachal Pradesh
- In office 18 March 1987 – 16 March 1990
- Chief Minister: Gegong Apang
- Preceded by: Bhishma Narain Singh
- Succeeded by: Gopal Singh

15th Home Secretary of India
- In office 15 January 1985 – 30 June 1986
- Prime Minister: Rajiv Gandhi
- Preceded by: Prem Kumar
- Succeeded by: C. G. Somiah

Personal details
- Born: 27 June 1928
- Died: 31 July 2020 (aged 92)

Ram D. Pradhan (27 June 1928 – 31 July 2020) was an Indian Administrative Service officer, from the 1952 batch who served as Union Home Secretary and Governor of Arunachal Pradesh during the Rajiv Gandhi government.

Pradhan played a major role in signing the Assam Accord and the Mizo Accord. He held Secretary-level positions at the international and national levels in the areas of commerce, defence and home. He was in service of the government of India for 36 years.

Pradhan was an IAS officer of the 1952 batch who served in the Maharashtra cadre. He joined as a Bombay State officer. For the next five years he worked in Gujarat. He was a Private Secretary to the Union Minister of Defence Y. B. Chavan. Later, he was an Indian representative diplomat in international trade and commerce in Geneva for ten years. He held several important positions in the Government of Maharashtra and the Government of India including Home Secretary, Government of Maharashtra, Director General of Shipping in the Government of India, and Chief Secretary, Government of Maharashtra. In December 2008, he was appointed to lead a two-man panel to investigate the 2008 Mumbai attacks. He died due to age-related ailments on July 31, 2020, aged 92.

== Union Home Secretary ==
Rajiv Gandhi, who was then the General Secretary of the Congress (I) party, was impressed by the work done by Pradhan, who as Chief Secretary of Maharashtra, had promptly handled and provided administrative services during the Bhiwandi communal riots of 1982. When Rajiv became the Prime Minister in 1984, he invited Pradhan to make his services available to the Government of India. Pradhan was appointed Union Home Secretary in 1985 and served in that post until his retirement in 1986.

Pradhan worked under Home Ministers S. B. Chavan and Buta Singh, and Minister of State for Home Arun Nehru.

== The Punjab problem ==
The first major task Pradhan took up as Home Secretary in February 1985, was to assess the political situation in Punjab. Politics in Punjab had become secessionist in nature and the Akali Dal party was calling for an independent country of Khalistan. Following the previous Prime Minister Indira Gandhi's ordering of Operation Blue Star to flush out the militants, and her subsequent assassination by her own Sikh bodyguards sympathetic to the Khalistan cause, the situation in Punjab had become tense. Pradhan suggested re-initialisation of dialogue with the Akali Dal, and as a precursor suggested the replacement of Punjab Governor K.T. Satarawalla, with a person of political background.

Following this, Arjun Singh was made the new Governor of Punjab in March 1985. Pradhan also suggested involving the former Maharashtra Chief Minister Sharad Pawar in the Punjab negotiations. Being from Maharashtra himself, Pradhan was aware of the political structure on his home state, and knew of Pawar's abilities, and his added advantage of being a friend of Parkash Singh Badal, one of the Akali strongmen. Pawar's appointment led the way to his rejoining the Congress (I) from which he had split. Pawar went on to become a Congress strongman in the Narasimha Rao government.

Pradhan was given the task of assessing the election-readiness of Punjab, and he arranged meetings between jailed student leaders and their mentors to assess the mood of the Punjab youth. When elections were held in Punjab, the Akali Dal joined the mainstream and was returned as the ruling party.

== Punjab Accord ==
Pradhan was involved in the implementing of the Punjab accord. He extended support to the Mathew Commission, set up to decide the Hindi-speaking areas of Punjab to be transferred to Haryana in lieu of Chandigarh which would be permanently transferred to Punjab as part of the accord. As per the commission's suggestion for a linguistic enumeration of the population of a village called Kandu Khera, the task demanded that the enumeration be fair and peaceful. Pradhan ordered the deployment of a contingent of Assam Rifles in the village for the safety of the enumerators, and so that political forces did not determine the outcome of the result. When both the Chief Ministers of Punjab and Haryana showed dissatisfaction with the neutrality of the enumerators, Pradhan selected 30 young IAS officers from non-Hindi speaking areas who successfully performed the enumeration. It was as per that enumeration that the commission concluded that it could not make any recommendation for a suitable contiguous Hindi-majority area of villages that can be transferred to Haryana.

Following this the Venkataramiah Commission was set up with the same purpose, and Pradhan represented the Central Government in the hearings of the commission. That commission too could not come up with a solution in time because of a last-minute change of plan by the Bhajan Lal government. To counter Bhajan Lal's opposition to the commission, he was replaced as Chief Minister by Bansi Lal who agreed to the commission's award.

Following this the Desai Commission was set up to complete the previous commission's work in 24 hours. Pradhan briefed the commission on the work done by the previous commissions, and provided it with records and figures available with the Home Ministry. However the commission could not complete its work as its term was extended at the behest of Punjab. Chandigarh is still a Union Territory shared as a joint capital by the states of Punjab and Haryana.

== Assam Accord ==
Student parties in Assam like AASU, were agitating against the influx of foreigners from Bangladesh and Nepal into the state. They were having talks with the Central Government from the time of Indira Gandhi in 1980 for a solution to the problem. The talks were formally discontinued in 1983 without a solution. Pradhan formally resumed talks on the Assam problem at the insistence of Prime Minister Rajiv Gandhi in April 1985. He invited the AASU representatives including Prafulla Kumar Mahanta, President AASU and Bhrigu Kumar Phukan, general secretary AASU to Delhi in May 1985. Pradhan held five meetings with AASU in the first round of talks in May starting with a twenty-five-point discussion list. Eventually the list was narrowed down to seven core issues. The policy for the detection and treatment of foreigners was discussed during these meetings.

Pradhan accompanied the Home Minister S.B. Chavan to Assam on 9 August 1985, and met over 95 delegations that day. The final round of talks began on 12 August, when the first written draft of the negotiations was prepared jointly by Pradhan and the joint secretary of AASU, S.S. Sharma. There was no written record of the previous talks as Pradhan feared it might be leaked to the Press. The talks were held in confidentiality and even the Assam Chief Minister and the Governor were unaware of the progress made. When AASU requested taking the draft back to Assam for approval by the party members, it was instead suggested to fly a sixty-member AASU Executive body to Delhi. Pradhan had kept Rajiv Gandhi deliberately out of the talks with AASU until they had approved the draft. Pradhan used the pressure of time to clinch the accord as it was 2:30 am on 15 August, and Rajiv Gandhi had decided to announce the signing of the accord in the Independence Day speech the same morning.

Following the accord the AASU formed their political wing Asom Gana Parishad which came to power in the elections held in Assam in December 1985, with P.K. Mahanta as Chief Minister.

== Mizoram Accord ==
In August 1985, Rajiv Gandhi handed over responsibility of negotiations with Laldenga to Pradhan. Laldenga, founder of the Mizo National Front had fought for secession of his land from the country. In 1976 he had signed an accord with the Indian government, but this was not implemented because of the successive change of governments. Negotiations were ongoing from the time of the 1980 Indira Gandhi government. Pradhan started direct talks with Laldenga in September 1985.

As in the case of Assam, Pradhan kept Rajiv Gandhi out of the negotiations. The talks started off roughly because Rajiv Gandhi had opposed some points of the agreement negotiated by Pradhan's predecessor with Laldenga. The talks progressed slowly, but in June 1986, Pradhan made an offer for a quick resolution as he was retiring from government service that month.

On 30 June, the day of his retirement, Pradhan again suggested that Laldenga be flexible to reach a settlement. Laldenga accepted this and in an hour's time all pending issues were cleared, and the draft of the agreement was prepared. Although they had planned to get the accord signed by Pradhan's successor, Rajiv Gandhi wanted it to be signed by Pradhan himself in the few hours left before his retirement. They consulted a legal expert and got his retirement postponed to midnight. The accord was then jointly signed by him, Laldenga and Lalkhama, the Chief Secretary of Mizoram.

== Governorship of Arunachal Pradesh ==
R.D. Pradhan was appointed the second Governor of Arunachal Pradesh in March 1987, after Arunachal was granted statehood in November 1986. The state was having border problems with China at the time, and Pradhan's achievements in reaching the accords of northeast states of Assam and Mizoram and his previous experience in the Defence Ministry were the factors Prime Minister Rajiv Gandhi considered before offering him the position. When V.P. Singh came to power in January 1990, he demanded the resignation of Governors of all states. Pradhan was the first governor to hand over the resignation.

== Maharashtra of Legislative Council (MLC) ==
R.D. Pradhan won a seat in the Maharashtra Legislative Council in June 1990 on the Congress ticket.

== Positions held ==
The positions listed are not in chronological order.

=== Constitutional ===
- Governor, Arunachal Pradesh : March 1987 – March 1990

=== Administrative ===
- Home Secretary, India : January 1985 – June 1986
- Chief Secretary, Maharashtra
- Home Secretary, Maharashtra : 1977
- Private Secretary to Y.B. Chavan, Chief Minister of Maharashtra, Defence Minister India : (1960–1965)
- India's Resident Representative in Geneva to UNCTAD and GATT : 12 years
- International civil servant : 5 years
- Assistant Collector and Sub-Divisional Magistrate, Mount Abu
- Chairman of the High-level Enquiry Commission for 26/11.

== Awards ==
- R.D. Pradhan was awarded the Padma Bhushan on Republic Day, 1987.

Government offices
Preceded by Bhishma Narain Singh	Governor of Arunachal Pradesh; 19 March 1987 – 16 March 1990	Succeeded by Gopal Singh
