= Natun Asom Gana Parishad =

Indian political party

Natun Asom Gana Parishad ('New Assamese People's Association') was a political party in the Indian state of Assam. NAGP was formed through a split of Asom Gana Parishad (AGP).

NAGP was led by former Union Law Minister and MP Dinesh Goswami and former Assam Home Minister Bhrigu Kumar Phukan. Goswami and Phukan had been prominent leaders of the Assam Agitation led by All Assam Students Union and All Assam Gana Sangram Parishad in the early 1980s. Other prominent leaders of the party included former Assam Education Minister Brindaban Goswami and former Assam Legislative Assembly speaker Pulakesh Barua.

In 1994, NAGP merged with AGP with Bhrigu Phukan as the Working President of the AGP. Phukan was later removed as the party's Working President and finally expelled from AGP in 1997 following differences with party president and the then Chief Minister of Assam Prafulla Kumar Mahanta. Another NAGP leader and former state Education minister Brindaban Goswami later became the president of AGP.
