= Bhubaneswar Kalita =

Indian politician and social worker

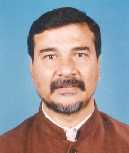
- Lok Sabha portrait

Member of Parliament, Rajya Sabha
- In office 10 April 2020 – 9 April 2026
- Preceded by: Self
- Succeeded by: Jogen Mohan
- Constituency: Assam
- In office 10 April 2008 – 5 August 2019
- Preceded by: Dwijendra Nath Sharmah
- Succeeded by: Self
- Constituency: Assam
- In office 10 April 1984 – 9 April 1996
- Preceded by: Dinesh Goswami
- Succeeded by: Prakanta Warisa
- Constituency: Assam

President, Assam Pradesh Congress Committee
- In office 2004–2014
- National President: Sonia Gandhi
- Preceded by: Paban Singh Ghatowar
- Succeeded by: Anjan Dutta

Cabinet Minister, Government of Assam
- In office 7 June 2002 – 11 September 2004
- Chief Minister: Tarun Gogoi
- Departments: Industries and Commerce; Public Enterprises
- Preceded by: Ismail Hussain
- Succeeded by: Anjan Dutta

Member of Parliament, Lok Sabha
- In office 23 March 1998 – 26 April 1999
- Preceded by: Prabin Chandra Sarma
- Succeeded by: Bijoya Chakravarty
- Constituency: Gauhati

Member, Assam Legislative Assembly
- In office 13 May 2001 – 11 May 2006
- Preceded by: Thaneswar Boro
- Succeeded by: Ananta Deka
- Constituency: Rangiya

Personal details
- Born: 1 April 1951 (age 75) Rangiya, Assam, India
- Party: Bharatiya Janata Party (since 2019)
- Other political affiliations: Indian National Congress (1984–2019)
- Education: Gauhati University
- Profession: Politician

Bhubaneswar Kalita (born 1 April 1951) is an Indian social worker, politician and a member of the Bharatiya Janata Party. He was a member of the Indian National Congress until 2019.

A 1971 B.A. graduate from Cotton College, Guwahati, Kalita subsequently completed an M. A. in 1974 and an L.L.B. in 1978 from Gauhati University.

Kalita has served as a Member of the Rajya Sabha from Assam for five terms, from 1984 to 1990, 1990 to 1996, 2008 to 2014, 2014 to 2019 and 2020 to 2026. He has also served as a member of the 12th Lok Sabha from 1998 to 1999, and was an MLA of Assam from Rangiya from 2001 to 2006, during which he was an Assam state minister from 2002 to 2004. From 2004 to 2014, he was president of the Assam Pradesh Congress Committee.

== Elections Contested ==
=== Rajya Sabha ===
Position	Party	Constituency	From	To	Tenure
Member of Parliament, Rajya Sabha (1st Term)	INC	Assam	10 April 1984	9 April 1990	5 years, 364 days
Member of Parliament, Rajya Sabha (2nd Term)	INC	Assam	10 April 1990	9 April 1996	5 years, 365 days
Member of Parliament, Rajya Sabha (3rd Term)	INC	Assam	10 April 2008	9 April 2014	5 years, 364 days
Member of Parliament, Rajya Sabha (4th Term)	INC	Assam	10 April 2014	5 August 2019	5 years, 117 days
Member of Parliament, Rajya Sabha (5th Term)	BJP	Assam	10 April 2020	9 April 2026	5 years, 364 days
