= Jalukbari Assembly constituency =

Constituency of the Assam legislative assembly in India

Jalukbari
- Constituency No. 51 for the Assam Legislative Assembly

Constituency details
- Country: India
- Region: Northeast India
- State: Assam
- District: Kamrup Metropolitan
- Lok Sabha constituency: Guwahati
- Established: 1967
- Reservation: None

Member of Legislative Assembly
- 16th Assam Legislative Assembly
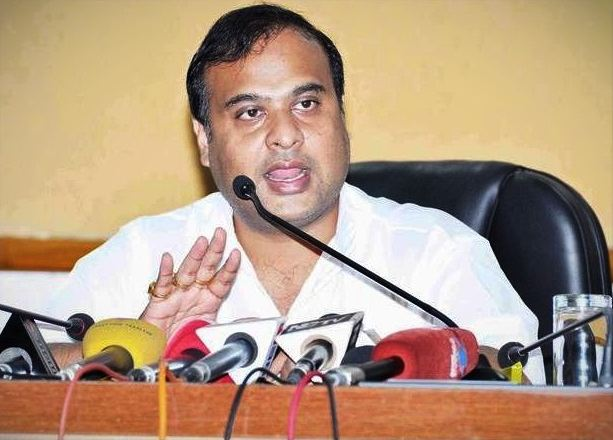
- Incumbent Himanta Biswa Sarma; Chief Minister of Assam
- Party: BJP
- Elected year: 2026

Jalukbari Assembly constituency is one of the 126 assembly constituencies of Assam state assembly, in north-east India. It is part of the Guwahati Lok Sabha constituency.

The Chief Minister of Assam Himanta Biswa Sarma has won Jalukbari constituency for six consecutive terms, thrice with the Indian National Congress and thrice with the Bharatiya Janata Party.

Most Successful parties from Jalukbari Vidhan Sabha
1. Indian National Congress (5 Times) 38 (36.9%)
2. Bharatiya Janata Party (3 Times) 21 (20.4%)
3. Asom Gana Parishad (2 Times) 15 (14.6%)
4. Janata Party (1 Time) 7 (6.80%)
5. Natun Asom Gana Parishad (1 Time) 7 (6.80%)
6. Independent politician (2 Times) 15 (14.6%)

== Members of Legislative Assembly ==
Most Successful M.L.A.s from Jalukbari Vidhan Sabha
1. Dr. Himanta Biswa Sarma (INC/BJP) (6 Times) 48 (46.2%)
2. Bhrigu Kumar Phukan (AGP) (3 Times) 24 (23.1%)
3. Lakhyadhar Choudhary (JP) (1 Time) 8 (7.69%)
4. Rebati Das (INC) (1 Time) 8 (7.69%)
5. Others (2 Times) 16 (15.4%)

Year	Name	Party
1967	Sailen Medhi	Independent
1972	Rebati Das	Indian National Congress
1978	Lakhyadhar Choudhury	Janata Party
1983	Shah Jalal Ali	Indian National Congress
1985	Bhrigu Kumar Phukan	Independent
1991	Bhrigu Kumar Phukan	Natun Asom Gana Parishad
1996	Bhrigu Kumar Phukan	Asom Gana Parishad
2001	Himanta Biswa Sarma	Indian National Congress
2006	Himanta Biswa Sarma	Indian National Congress
2011	Himanta Biswa Sarma	Indian National Congress
2016	Himanta Biswa Sarma	Bharatiya Janata Party
2021	Himanta Biswa Sarma	Bharatiya Janata Party
2026	Himanta Biswa Sarma	Bharatiya Janata Party

== Election results ==
=== 2026 ===
2026 Assam Legislative Assembly election: Jalukbari
Party	Candidate	Votes	%	±%
BJP	Himanta Biswa Sarma	127,151	74.20	▼3.19
INC	Bidisha Neog	37,717	22.07	▲5.00
NOTA	None of the above	3,440	2.01	▲0.72
Majority		89,434	52.13	−8.19
Turnout		1,70,854	82.78	+0.14
Registered electors		2,06,314		+5.91
BJP hold		Swing	-3.19	

=== 2021 ===
2021 Assam Legislative Assembly election: Jalukbari
Party	Candidate	Votes	%	±%
BJP	Himanta Biswa Sarma	130,762	77.39	+1.23
INC	Ramen Chandra Borthakur	28,851	17.07	−3.80
Independent	Hemanta Kumar Sut	4,838	2.86	New
NOTA	None of the above	2,157	1.29	+0.60
Majority		1,01,911	60.32	+5.03
Turnout		1,69,155	82.64	−2.54
Registered electors		194,794		+7.49
BJP hold		Swing		

=== 2016 ===
2016 Assam Legislative Assembly election: Jalukbari
Party	Candidate	Votes	%	±%
BJP	Himanta Biswa Sarma	118,390	76.16	+52.11
INC	Niren Deka	32,455	20.87	−51.22
AITC	Sadek Ali	371	0.23	−0.73
NOTA	None of the above	1,074	0.69	N/A
Majority		85,935	55.29	−4.19
Turnout		1,55,436	85.18	+6.02
Registered electors		1,81,215		
BJP gain from INC		Swing	+51.67	

=== 2011 ===
2011 Assam Legislative Assembly election: Jalukbari
Party	Candidate	Votes	%	±%
INC	Himanta Biswa Sarma	93,812	72.09	+8.62
BJP	Prodyut Bora	16,409	12.61	+7.96
AGP	Monoj Kumar Saikia	14,887	11.44	−17.00
AITC	Bimal Mochachary	1,250	0.96	N/A
Independent	Ramen Lahkar	1,037	0.80	N/A
AIUDF	Atma Ram Deka	933	0.72	−0.97
SP	Nathuni Das	836	0.64	N/A
Independent	Prafulla Bharali	495	0.38	N/A
Independent	Naba Kumar Nath	473	0.36	N/A
Majority		77,403	59.48	+24.45
Turnout		1,30,132	79.16	+1.34
INC hold		Swing	+0.33	

=== 2006 ===
Assam Legislative Assembly election, 2006: Jalukbari
Party	Candidate	Votes	%	±%
INC	Himanta Biswa Sarma	76,948	63.47	+16.76
AGP	Puspa Deka	34,480	28.44	N/A
BJP	Jayanta Kumar Das	5,632	4.65	−3.94
AIUDF	Md. Bapukan Ali	2,049	1.69	N/A
AGP(P)	Manoj Saikia	1,142	0.94	N/A
Independent	Phukan Boro	978	0.81	N/A
Majority		42,468	35.03	+24.63
Turnout		1,21,229	77.82	+2.02
INC hold		Swing		

=== 2001 ===
Assam Legislative Assembly election, 2001: Jalukbari
Party	Candidate	Votes	%	±%
INC	Himanta Biswa Sarma	45,054	46.76	
NCP	Bhrigu Kumar Phukan	35,035	36.36	
BJP	Ramendra Nath Deka	8,278	8.59	
CPI(M)	Purna Boro	3,110	3.23	
LJP	Puspa Deka	1,683	1.75	
Independent	Dilip Kumar Mahajan	904	0.94	
SJP(R)	Anil Sarma	728	0.76	
SAP	Alok Sen	468	0.49	
Independent	Atmaram Deka	456	0.47	
UMFA	Bijoy Krishna Ghosh	365	0.38	
SP	Umesh Chandra Das	277	0.29	
Majority		10,019	10.40	
Turnout		96,358	75.80	
INC gain from AGP		Swing		

=== 1996 ===
Assam Legislative Assembly election, 1996: Jalukbari
Party	Candidate	Votes	%	±%
AGP	Bhrigu Kumar Phukan	46,446	54.97	
INC	Himanta Biswa Sarma	29,318	34.70	
BJP	Sasi Sarma	7,136	8.45	
Majority		17,128	20.27	
Turnout		84,490	76.52	
AGP gain from NAGP		Swing		

== See also ==
- Jalukbari
- List of constituencies of Assam Legislative Assembly
