= Nibaran Bora =

Nibaran Bora was a politician, writer, journalist, teacher, athlete, speaker, social worker, labor leader and peasant leader of Assam. He was one of the leaders of the Assam Movement. He questioned the rationale of the Assam Accord, considering it unconstitutional and a betrayal of the interests of the Assamese.
