= Nellie, 1983 =

Book by Diganta Sharma on the Nellie massacre

- Cover page of Nellie, 1983
- Author: Diganta Sharma
- Original title: Nellie, 1983
- Language: Assamese
- Subject: Historic
- Published: 30 October 2007; Eklabya Prakashan
- Publication place: India
- Media type: Print (Hardcover)
- Pages: 94

Nellie, 1983 is an Assamese history book written by Diganta Sharma based on the Nellie massacre that took place during the Assam Movement in 1983. The book is published by Eklabya Prakashan, Jorhat, Assam.

== Cover story ==
On 17 February 1983, two truckloads of police contingents came to Borbori and assured the inhabitants that they are patrolling nearby and full security has been provided to them. Being assured of security by the security personnel, Muslim residents of Nellie went to work outside as usual on 18 February 1983. At around 8:30 am, suddenly the village was attacked by mobs from three sides surrounding the villagers and pushing them towards the river Kopili. People armed with sharp weapons, spears, and a few guns, advanced towards Nellie in an organized manner. The attackers encircled the whole village and left open the side that pointed towards the river Kopili. There were attackers in boats too. The killing started at around 9 am and continued till 3 pm. Most of the victims were women and children in the infamous Nellie massacre which resulted in 3,000 lives (non-officially 10,000).

The survivors were taken to Nagaon police station. Most of the survivors were put into Nellie camp at Nagaon and they returned to their village after 14 days upon restoration of normalcy. Police filed 688 criminal cases, of which 378 cases were closed due to "lack of evidence" and 310 cases were charge-sheeted, and all these cases were dropped by the Government as a part of the Assam Accord. Consequently, not a single person received punishment.

== See also ==
- Nellie massacre
