= Prabin Chandra Sarma =

Indian politician

Member of Parliament, Lok Sabha
- In office 1996-1998
- Preceded by: Kirip Chaliha
- Succeeded by: Bhubaneshwar Kalita
- Constituency: Gauhati, Assam

Personal details
- Born: 1 March 1937 (age 89) Village Bali ,Kamrup district, Assam, British India
- Party: Asom Gana Parishad
- Spouse: Geeta Sarma

Prabin Chandra Sarma is an Indian politician. He was elected to the Lok Sabha, lower house of the Parliament of India from Gauhati, Assam in the 1996 Indian general election as a member of the Asom Gana Parishad, serving till 1998.
