= Guwahati Lok Sabha constituency =

Lok Sabha constituency in Assam

Coordinates: 26.2°N 91.7°E

Guwahati AS-5
- Lok Sabha constituency
- Interactive Map Outlining Guwahati Lok Sabha constituency

Constituency details
- Country: India
- Region: Northeast India
- State: Assam
- Established: 1952
- Reservation: None

Member of Parliament
- 18th Lok Sabha
- Incumbent Bijuli Kalita Medhi
- Party: BJP
- Alliance: NDA
- Elected year: 2024

Guwahati Lok Sabha constituency (also spelt as Gauhati), is one of the largest Lok Sabha constituency in Assam.

== Assembly segments ==
Gauhati Lok Sabha constituency is composed of the following assembly segments:

No.	Name	District	Member	Party	2024 Lead
13	Goalpara West (ST)	Goalpara	Pabitra Rabha (politician)	BJP	BJP
15	Dudhnai (ST)	Goalpara	Tankeswar Rabha	BJP	BJP
27	Chamaria	Kamrup	Rekibuddin Ahmed	INC	INC
28	Boko–Chaygaon (ST)	Kamrup	Raju Mesh	BJP	BJP
29	Palasbari	Kamrup	Himangshu Shekhar Baishya	BJP	BJP
33	Dispur	Kamrup Metro	Pradyut Bordoloi	BJP	BJP
34	Dimoria (SC)	Kamrup Metro	Tapan Das	AGP	BJP
35	New Guwahati	Kamrup Metro	Diplu Ranjan Sarmah	BJP	BJP
36	Guwahati Central	Kamrup Metro	Vijay Kumar Gupta	BJP	BJP
37	Jalukbari	Kamrup Metro	Himanta Biswa Sarma	BJP	BJP

== Members of Parliament ==
Year	Winner	Party
1952	Rohini Kumar Chaudhury	Indian National Congress
1956^	Devendra Nath Sarma	Indian National Congress
1957	Hem Barua	Praja Socialist Party
1962	Hem Barua	Praja Socialist Party
1967	Dhireswar Kalita	Communist Party of India
1971	Dinesh Goswami	Indian National Congress
1977	Renuka Devi Barkataki	Janata Party
1984	Dinesh Goswami	Asom Gana Parishad
1991	Kirip Chaliha	Indian National Congress
1996	Prabin Chandra Sarmah	Asom Gana Parishad
1998	Bhubaneshwar Kalita	Indian National Congress
1999	Bijoya Chakravarty	Bharatiya Janata Party
2004	Kirip Chaliha	Indian National Congress
2009	Bijoya Chakravarty	Bharatiya Janata Party
2014	Bijoya Chakravarty	Bharatiya Janata Party
2019	Queen Oja	Bharatiya Janata Party
2024	Bijuli Kalita Medhi	Bharatiya Janata Party

^ by-poll

== Election results ==
=== General election 2024 ===
2024 Indian general election: Guwahati
Party	Candidate	Votes	%	±%
BJP	Bijuli Kalita Medhi	894,887	55.95	▼1.25
INC	Mira Borthakur Goswami	643,797	40.25	▲2.64
NOTA	None of the above	20,249	1.27	
Majority		251,090	15.70	
Turnout		1,602,455	78.56	▼2.31
BJP hold		Swing	▼1.25	

=== General election 2019 ===
2019 Indian general elections: Gauhati
Party	Candidate	Votes	%	±%
BJP	Queen Oja	1,008,936	57.20	+6.60
INC	Bobbeeta Sarma	6,63,330	37.61	+7.90
IND.	Upamanyu Hazarika	21,193	1.20	+1.20
AITC	Manoj Sarma	10,141	0.57	+0.03
IND.	Faruk Ahmed Bhuyan	9,044	0.51	+0.51
NOTA	None of the Above	10,466	0.59	+0.15
Majority		345,606	19.59	−1.30
Turnout		1,763,950	80.87	+2.23
BJP hold		Swing	+6.60	

=== General election 2014 ===
2014 Indian general elections: Gauhati
Party	Candidate	Votes	%	±%
BJP	Bijoya Chakravarty	764,985	50.60	+5.86
INC	Manash Borah	449,201	29.71	−13.96
AIUDF	Gopi Nath Das	137,254	9.08	+2.47
AGP	Birendra Prasad Baishya	86,546	5.72	+5.72
Independent	Benedict Alok Areng	12,432	0.82	+0.82
AITC	Biju Phukan	8,162	0.54	+0.54
Independent	Pradip Kalita	7,345	0.49	+0.49
Regional Democratic Secular Congress	Kazi Nekib Ahmed	6,636	0.44	+0.44
Independent	Anil Bhagawati	5,782	0.38	+0.38
AAP	Pranjal Bordoloy	4,809	0.32	+0.32
Independent	Dr. Faruk Aahammed Bhuyan	3,540	0.23	+0.23
SP	Bandana Barman Baruah	3,240	0.21	−0.12
Independent	Dhiraj Medhi	2,845	0.19	+0.19
Independent	Padmeshwar Phukan	2,629	0.17	+0.17
Independent	Khargeswar Das	2,532	0.17	+0.17
Lok Bharati	Gopi Baruah	2,411	0.16	+0.16
Independent	Ajad Ali	2,385	0.16	+0.16
NOTA	None of the Above	6,720	0.44	+0.44
Majority		315,784	20.89	+19.82
Turnout		1,512,248	78.67	+14.35
BJP hold		Swing	+5.86	

=== 1956 by-election ===
In 1956, a bye-election was held. The election was won by the INC candidate Devendra Nath Sarma with 45057 votes, against Hem Barua of Praja Socialist Party with 29112 votes.

== See also ==
- Gauhati
- List of constituencies of the Lok Sabha
