= Tapan Das (politician) =

Indian politician

Member of the Assam Legislative Assembly
- Incumbent
- Assumed office 4 May 2026
- Constituency: Dimoria

Personal details
- Party: Asom Gana Parishad
- Profession: Politician

Tapan Das is an Indian politician from Assam. He was elected to the Assam Legislative Assembly from Dimoria Assembly constituency in the 2026 Assam Legislative Assembly election. He is a member of the Asom Gana Parishad.
