= Dimoria Assembly constituency =

Assembly constituency of Assam

Dimoria
- Constituency No. 34 for the Assam Legislative Assembly

Constituency details
- Country: India
- Region: Northeast India
- State: Assam
- Division: Lower Assam
- District: Kamrup Metropolitan
- Lok Sabha constituency: Guwahati
- Established: 2023
- Reservation: SC

Member of Legislative Assembly
- 16th Assam Legislative Assembly
- Incumbent Tapan Das
- Party: AGP
- Alliance: NDA
- Elected year: 2026

Dimoria Assembly constituency is one of the 126 assembly constituencies of Assam a north east state of India. It was newly formed in 2023.

== Election Results ==
=== 2026 ===
2026 Assam Legislative Assembly election: Dimoria
| Party | Candidate | Votes | % | ±% |
|---|---|---|---|---|
| AGP | Tapan Das | 116,058 | 64.71 | |
| INC | Kishor Kumar Baruah | 50,673 | 28.25 | |
| NOTA | NOTA | 3,306 | 1.84 | |
| Margin of victory | | 65,385 | | |
| Turnout | | 179,348 | | |
| Rejected ballots | | | | |
| Registered electors | | | | |
| AGP win (new seat) | | | | |

== See also ==
- Kamrup Metropolitan district
- List of constituencies of Assam Legislative Assembly
- Government of Assam
- Government of India
