= Tanzil Hussain =

Indian politician (born 1999)

Tanzil Hussain (born 1999) is an Indian politician from Assam. He is a member of the Assam Legislative Assembly from the Samaguri Assembly constituency in Nagaon district representing the Indian National Congress.

Hussain is from Samaguri, Nagaon district, Assam. He is the son of Dubri MP, Rakibul Hussain. He completed Class 12 and passed the AISSCE from Sai RNS Academy, Guwahati. In 2018, he did his Class 10 in the C.B.S.E. stream. He runs his own business and declared assets worth Rs.4 crore in his affidavit to the Election Commission of India.

== Career ==
Hussain won the Samaguri Assembly constituency representing the Indian National Congress in the 2026 Assam Legislative Assembly election. He polled 1,08,310 votes and defeated his nearest rival, Anil Saikia of the Bharatiya Janata Party, by a margin of 93,584 votes. In the 2024 by poll, he lost to Diplu Ranjan Sarmah of the Bharatiya Janata Party.
