= Queen Oja =

Indian politician

Member of Parliament, Lok Sabha
- In office 2019–2024
- Preceded by: Bijoya Chakravarty
- Succeeded by: Bijuli Kalita Medhi
- Constituency: Gauhati, Assam

Mayor of the Guwahati Municipal Corporation
- In office 1996-1997
- Preceded by: Hemprabha Saikia
- Succeeded by: Sonadhar Das

Personal details
- Born: 27 November 1950 (age 75) Gauhati, Assam
- Party: Bharatiya Janata Party
- Other political affiliations: Asom Gana Parishad
- Occupation: Businesswoman
- Profession: Politician

Queen Oja (born 27 November 1950) is an Indian politician and businesswoman who served as a member of the Lok Sabha (lower house of Indian parliament), representing Guwahati constituency from 2019 to 2024. She also served as the mayor of the Guwahati Municipal Corporation from 1996 to 1997.
