= Jitu Goswami =

Indian politician

Member of Assam Legislative Assembly
- Incumbent
- Assumed office 21 May 2021
- Preceded by: Prafulla Kumar Mahanta
- Constituency: Barhampur (Vidhan Sabha constituency)

Personal details
- Party: Bharatiya Janata Party
- Spouse: Mrs Gitika Goswami
- Profession: Politician

Jitu Goswami is an Indian politician and member of Bharatiya Janata Party from Assam. He is an MLA, elected from the Barhampur constituency in the 2021 Assam Legislative Assembly election.
