= Nellie massacre =

Pogrom against Miya people in Assam, India

Nellie Massacre
- Assam (India)
- Location: 26.111483°N 92.317253°E; Assam, India
- Date: 18 February 1983
- Target: Bengal-origin Muslims
- Attack type: Mass murder
- Deaths: 2,000 – 3,000
- Perpetrators: A mob comprising local Hindus, including Tiwas, the Koch caste Assamese Hindus, and other local communities.
- Motive: Retaliation and revenge (based on alleged unconfirmed reports of inciting incidents); Anti-immigration sentiment; Anti-Miya sentiment

The Nellie massacre took place in central Assam during a seven-hour period on the morning of 18 February 1983. The massacre claimed the lives of 2000–3000 people from 14 villages—Alisingha, Khulapathar, Basundhari, Bugduba Beel, Bugduba Habi, Borjola, Butuni, Dongabori, Indurmari, Mati Parbat, Muladhari, Mati Parbat no. 8, Silbheta, Borburi and Nellie—of Nagaon district. The victims were people of Bengali Muslim descent. Three media personnel, including Hemendra Narayan of The Indian Express and Bedabrata Lahkar of The Assam Tribune, were witnesses to the massacre. The death toll was notably high among children, women, and the elderly, who were unable to flee the attackers. Bodies were strewn across fields and in some instances, whole families were killed. The victims were called foreigners, or even Bangladeshis, despite the fact that the majority of them had been living there since the 1930s.

The violence that took place in Nellie was by natives, mostly rural peasants. It was carried out by a mob comprising local Hindus, including Tiwas, the Koch caste Assamese Hindus, and other local communities. It was seen as a fallout of the decision to hold the controversial state elections in 1983 in the midst of the Assam Agitation, after Prime Minister Indira Gandhi's decision to give four million Bengali Muslims the right to vote. It has been described as one of the worst pogroms since World War II and one of the deadliest pogroms against a minority community in post-partition India.

== Context ==
In 1978, Lok Sabha member Hiralal Patwari died, necessitating a by-election in the Mangaldoi Lok Sabha Constituency. During the process of the election it was noticed that the electorate had grown phenomenally. Investigation revealed that there had been mass inclusion of alleged illegal migrants. The All Assam Students Union (AASU) demanded that the elections be postponed until the names of 'foreign nationals' were deleted from the electoral rolls. The AASU subsequently launched an agitation to compel the government to identify and expel allegedly illegal immigrants.

The central government attempted to placate the Assamese by agreeing to proscribe any migrants who entered the state after March 1971 from voting, and proceeded with the elections. The Assamese, demanding an earlier cutoff date, were inimical to the government's decision, as were the Tiwa people who resented the proliferation of Bengali immigrants onto their land. Conversely, the Bengali communities (both Hindu and Muslim) as well as the Plains Tribal Council of Assam, an organization composed exclusively of Boro tribals opposed to Assamese hegemony, supported the elections, and subsequent inter-ethnic violence unfolded.

The ethnic clash that took place in Nellie was seen as a fallout of the decision to hold the controversial Assembly elections in 1983 (boycotted by the AASU) despite stiff opposition from several elements in the state. Police officials had suggested to hold the polls in phases in order to avoid violence. According to then Assam Inspector General of Police, KPS Gill, there were 63 constituencies, where elections could have been held without any trouble. Among the rest, the Assam police had declared there were 23 constituencies where it was "impossible to hold any election." Nellie was cited as one of the "troubled" spots before the elections. 400 companies of Central Paramilitary Force and 11 brigades of the Indian Army were deployed to guard Assam while the polls were scheduled to take place in phases.

== Vajpayee's Comments ==
In a speech, Atal Bihari Vajpayee expressed concern about the government's inaction towards foreigners: "Foreigners have arrived, and the government remains inactive. Imagine if they had entered Punjab – people would have dealt with them harshly and would [have] chopped them into pieces and thrown them away". Following the speech, violence erupted in Nellie. Vajpayee, returning to New Delhi from Assam, strongly condemned the Nellie massacre. This quote attributed to Vajpayee was presented by former CPI-M MP Indrajit Gupta during a trust vote debate in May 1996, and it went unchallenged in the Lok Sabha.

== Rumors ==
Reports that immigrant Bengali Muslims had kidnapped and gang-raped four young women from a Lalung family, killed six children, illegally cultivated Tiwa lands, and stolen cows quickly spread, leading Tiwa Hindus to assemble to avenge the outrages. It was also alleged that on February 13, Miya Muslims had attacked a Bihari village in that area. The occurrence of the alleged killings and abductions remains uncertain, as no First Information Report (FIR) could be located, nor is there any record of criminal proceedings against the purported perpetrators. None of the individuals interviewed in Nellie confirmed that such incidents had taken place. Tiwa chiefs reportedly decided they must kill at least 700 Bengalis for each of their tribesmen killed, and consequently an all-out attack was launched on immigrant areas.

== Massacre ==
The massacre itself took place on the morning of 18 February 1983, starting in the village of Borbori, perpetrated by several hundred Tiwas, who targeted Nellie and 14 other Muslim-majority villages in the area. In Nellie, the mob burnt many houses and placed itself at all the roads and exits to the village, killing anyone who tried to escape. The massacre lasted until dusk. Between 2,000 and 3,000 people died, but locals report the number as having been higher.

The massacre ended with the arrival of the Central Reserve Police Force (CRPF) in the evening. Many survivors recall that the local police tried convincing the CRPF battalion that there was no violence in the area; the smoke emitted was due to burning of agricultural waste rather than houses. The survivors also recalled that the local police diverted the battalion to patrol the national highway suggesting that no road lead to the area from where the smoke rose. The battalion eventually located the area when a woman from the village stopped the CRPF trucks and led them to the village.

== Consequences ==
The official Tiwari Commission report on the Nellie massacre is still a closely guarded secret (only three copies reportedly exist). The 600-page report was submitted to the Assam Government in 1984 and the Congress Government (headed by Hiteswar Saikia) decided not to make it public, and subsequent Governments followed suit. Assam United Democratic Front and others are making legal efforts to make Tiwari Commission report public, so that reasonable justice is delivered to victims, at least after 25 years after the incident.

Police filed 688 criminal cases, of which 378 cases were closed due to "lack of evidence" and 310 cases were slated to be charged. However, all these cases were dropped by the Government of India as a part of the 1985 Assam Accord; and, as a result, no one was prosecuted.

Prime Minister Rajiv Gandhi signed the Assam Accord with the leaders of the AASU to formally end the Assam Agitation in 1985.

== In films and literature ==
- What the Fields Remember, has been produced by Public Service Broadcasting Trust.
- Nellier Kotha (the Nellie Story) directed by Parthajit Baruah's

== See also ==
- Nellie, 1983
- Khoirabari massacre
- Silapathar massacre
- Anti-Bengali sentiment
- List of massacres in India
- 1984 anti-Sikh riots

== Sources ==
- Dasgupta, Keya; Guha, Amalendu (1985). "1983 Assembly Poll in Assam: An Analysis of Its Background and Implications". Economic and Political Weekly. 20 (19): 843–853. JSTOR 4374393.
- Kimura, Makiko (2013). The Nellie Massacre of 1983: Agency of Rioters. Sage Publications India. ISBN 9788132111665.
- Pisharoty, Sangeeta Barooah (2019). "There is a Conspiracy to Show Bengal-Origin Muslims as Anti-Assamese: Hafiz Ahmed". The Wire (Interview).
- Yasmeen, Jabeen (2023). "Creating an Oral Map: 'Living On' after the Nellie Massacre, 1983". South Asia Journal of South Asian Studies. 46 (5): 903–919.
