= Samaguri Assembly constituency =

Assembly constituency of Assam

Samaguri
- Constituency No. 58 for the Assam Legislative Assembly

Constituency details
- Country: India
- Region: Northeast India
- State: Assam
- District: Nagaon
- Lok Sabha constituency: Nagaon
- Established: 1951
- Reservation: None

Samaguri Assembly constituency is one of the 126 assembly constituencies of Assam Legislative Assembly. Samaguri forms part of the Nagaon Lok Sabha constituency.

== Members of the Legislative Assembly ==
Year	Member	Party
1952	Usha Borthakur	Indian National Congress
1957	Usha Borthakur	Indian National Congress
1972	Bishnu Prasad	Indian National Congress
1978	Bhabendra Kumar Saikia	Janata Party
1981	Nurul Hussain	Indian Congress
1985	Abul Hussain Sarkar	Independent politician
1991	Nurul Hussain	Indian Congress
1996	Atul Kumar Sharma	Asom Gana Parishad
2001	Rakibul Hussain	Indian National Congress
2006	Rakibul Hussain	Indian National Congress
2011	Rakibul Hussain	Indian National Congress
2016	Rakibul Hussain	Indian National Congress
2021	Rakibul Hussain	Indian National Congress
2024^	Diplu Ranjan Sarmah	Bharatiya Janata Party
2026	Tanzil Hussain	Indian National Congress

^ By-election

== Election results ==
=== 2026 ===
2021 Assam Legislative Assembly election: Samaguri
Party	Candidate	Votes	%	±%
INC	Tanzil Hussain	145,212	68.09	
BJP	Anil Saikia	36902	17.3	
AIUDF	Abdul Aziz	27904	13.08	
None of the Above	NOTA	995	0.47	
Majority		108310		
Turnout		213275		
Registered electors				
INC gain from BJP		Swing		

=== 2024 by-election ===
2024 Elections in India : Samaguri
Party	Candidate	Votes	%	±%
BJP	Diplu Ranjan Sarmah	81,321	56.94	▲17.54
INC	Tanzil Hussain	56,820	39.78	▼18.31
Majority		24,501		
Turnout		1,42,824	85.38	
Registered electors		1,65,045		
BJP gain from INC		Swing		

=== 2021 ===
2021 Assam Legislative Assembly election: Samaguri
Party	Candidate	Votes	%	±%
INC	Rakibul Hussain	81,123	58.09	
BJP	Anil Saikia	55,025	39.40	
AJP	Abidur Rahman	1,678		
	Pranjit Bhowmik	705		
Majority		26,098		
Turnout		1,38,531	85.38	
Registered electors		1,65,045		
INC hold		Swing		

=== 2016 ===
2016 Assam Legislative Assembly election: Samaguri
Party	Candidate	Votes	%	±%
INC	Rakibul Hussain	66,364	51.95%	
BJP	Jitu Goswami	51,849	40.59%	
AIUDF	Moskur Rahman Choudhury	6,726	5.26%	
Independent	Chitta Ranjan Paul	1,282	1.00%	
NOTA	None of the above	968	0.76%	
Independent	Pradip Kalita	562	0.44%	
Majority		14,515	11.36%	
Turnout		127,751	89.79%	
Registered electors		142,303		
INC hold		Swing		
