= Nagaon–Batadraba Assembly constituency =

Constituency of the Assam legislative assembly in India

Coordinates: 26.35°N 92.69°E

Nowgong
- Constituency No. 86 for the Assam Legislative Assembly

Constituency details
- Country: India
- Region: Northeast India
- State: Assam
- District: Nagaon
- Lok Sabha constituency: Nowgong
- Established: 1957
- Reservation: None

Member of Legislative Assembly
- 16th Assam Legislative Assembly
- Incumbent Rupak Sarmah
- Party: Bharatiya Janata Party
- Elected year: 2026

Nowgong Assembly constituency was one of the 126 Assembly constituencies of Assam Legislative Assembly. This constituency was renamed to Nagaon–Batadraba in 2023.

Currently Rupak Sarmah of Bharatiya Janata Party represents this constituency. The constituency was represented mostly by Indian National Congress legislators (9 times) followed by Asom Gana Parishad legislators (4 times). Girindra Kumar Baruah and Mukut Sharma represented the constituency three times each.

Nowgong constituency was also a part of Nowgong Lok Sabha Constituency. Rupak Sharma is an Indian politician from Assam and a member of the Bharatiya Janata Party. He was elected to the Assam Legislative Assembly from the Nowgong Assembly constituency in the 2016 Assam Legislative Assembly election, defeating Indian National Congress candidate Dr. Durlav Chamua.

He was re-elected from the Nowgong constituency in the 2021 Assam Legislative Assembly election. Within the party, he is regarded as an active leader and has been discussed in political circles as a potential candidate for ministerial responsibilities.

== Members of Legislative Assembly ==
Election	Name	Party
1957	Mahendra Nath Hazarika	Indian National Congress
1957	Dev Kant Baruah	Indian National Congress
1959 (By-election)	Phani Bora	Communist Party of India
1962	Moti Ram Bora	Indian National Congress
1962 (By-election)	Rupram Sut	Indian National Congress
1967	Phani Bora	Communist Party of India
1972	Lila Kanta Bora	Indian National Congress
1978	Mukut Sarma	Indian National Congress
1983	Mukut Sarma	Indian National Congress
1985	Prafulla Kumar Mahanta	Independent
1991	Mukut Sarma	Indian National Congress
1996	Prafulla Kumar Mahanta	Asom Gana Parishad
1996 (By-election)	Girindra Kumar Baruah	Asom Gana Parishad
2001	Girindra Kumar Baruah	Asom Gana Parishad
2006	Girindra Kumar Baruah	Asom Gana Parishad
2011	Dr. Durlav Chandra Chamua	Indian National Congress
2016	Rupak Sarmah	Bharatiya Janata Party
2021	Rupak Sarmah	Bharatiya Janata Party
2026	Rupak Sarmah	Bharatiya Janata Party

== Election results ==
=== 2026 ===
2026 Assam Legislative Assembly election: Nagaon-Batadraba
Party	Candidate	Votes	%	±%
BJP	Rupak Sarmah	113,958	67.40	
INC	Durlav Chamua	51,974	30.74	
NOTA	NOTA	2,061	1.22	
Margin of victory		61,984	36.86	
Turnout		169,066		
BJP hold		Swing		

=== 2016 ===
2016 Assam Legislative Assembly election: Nowgong
Party	Candidate	Votes	%	±%
BJP	Rupak Sharma	66,706		
INC	Dr. Durlav Chamua	53442		
Majority				
Turnout				
Registered electors				
BJP gain from INC		Swing		
