= Guwahati Central Assembly constituency =

Assembly constituency of Assam

Guwahati Central
- Constituency No. 36 for the Assam Legislative Assembly

Constituency details
- Country: India
- Region: Northeast India
- State: Assam
- Division: Lower Assam
- District: Kamrup Metropolitan
- Lok Sabha constituency: Guwahati
- Established: 2023
- Reservation: None

Member of Legislative Assembly
- 16th Assam Legislative Assembly
- Incumbent Vijay Kumar Gupta
- Party: Bharatiya Janata Party
- Elected year: 2026

Guwahati Central Assembly constituency is one of the 126 assembly constituencies of Assam a north east state of India. It was newly formed in 2023.

== Members of Legislative Assembly ==
Year	Member	Party
2026		

== Election Results ==
=== 2026 ===
2026 Assam Legislative Assembly election: Guwahati Central
Party	Candidate	Votes	%	±%
BJP	Vijay Kumar Gupta	101,297	68.87	
AJP	Kunki Choudhury	39,376	26.77	
AITC	Avijit Mazumdar	1,061	0.72	
AAP	Anurupa Dekaraja	1,939	1.32	
Independent	Achyut Kalita	536	0.36	
Independent	Prabin Jyoti Kalita	509	0.35	
NOTA	None of the above	1,892	1.29	
Margin of victory		61921		
Turnout		147,088		
Registered electors				
BJP win (new seat)				

== See also ==
- Kamrup Metropolitan district
- List of constituencies of Assam Legislative Assembly
- Government of Assam
- Government of India
