= Barhampur Assembly constituency =

Constituency of the Assam legislative assembly in India

Barhampur
- Constituency No. 59 for the Assam Legislative Assembly

Constituency details
- Country: India
- Region: Northeast India
- State: Assam
- District: Nagaon
- Lok Sabha constituency: Kaziranga
- Established: 1972
- Reservation: None

Member of Legislative Assembly
- 16th Assam Legislative Assembly
- Incumbent Jitu Goswami
- Party: Bharatiya Janata Party

Barhampur is one of the 126 assembly constituencies of Assam a north east state of India. Barhampur is also part of Kaziranga Lok Sabha constituency.

== Members of Legislative Assembly ==
Election	Name	Party
1972	Kehoram Hazarika	Communist Party of India
1978	Lakheshwar Gohain	Janata Party
1983	Ramesh Phukan	Indian National Congress
1985	Girindra Kumar Baruah	Independent politician
1991	Prafulla Kumar Mahanta	Asom Gana Parishad
1996	Prafulla Kumar Mahanta	Asom Gana Parishad
2001	Prafulla Kumar Mahanta	Asom Gana Parishad
2006	Prafulla Kumar Mahanta	Asom Gana Parishad
2011	Prafulla Kumar Mahanta	Asom Gana Parishad
2016	Prafulla Kumar Mahanta	Asom Gana Parishad
2021	Jitu Goswami	Bharatiya Janata Party

== Election results ==
=== 2026 ===
2026 Assam Legislative Assembly election: Barhampur
Party	Candidate	Votes	%	±%
BJP	Jitu Goswami	117127	59.54	
AJP	Rajen Gohain	60986	31	
AIUDF	MAZIBUR RAHMAN	6522	3.32	
NOTA	NOTA	2745	1.4	
Turnout		196714		
Rejected ballots				
Registered electors				
gain from		Swing		

=== 2021 ===
2021 Assam Legislative Assembly election: Barhampur
Party	Candidate	Votes	%	±%
BJP	Jitu Goswami	70,111	48.70	N/A
INC	Suresh Bora	69,360	48.18	+3.46
AJP	Dipika Saikia Keot	1,922	1.34	N/A
SUCI(C)	Sonaram Bora	523	0.36	+0.16
Independent	Samsheddin Ahmed	417	0.29	N/A
AJM	Parbin Choudhury	333	0.23	N/A
NOTA	None of the above	1,291	0.9	+0.03
Majority		751	0.52	−3.29
Turnout		1,43,957	80.14	−3.71
Registered electors		1,79,641		
BJP gain from AGP		Swing		

=== 2016 ===
2016 Assam Legislative Assembly election: Barhampur
Party	Candidate	Votes	%	±%
AGP	Prafulla Kumar Mahanta	65,768	48.53	
INC	Suresh Bora	60,599	44.72	
AIUDF	Shariful Islam Siddique	2,787	2.05	
CPI	Lakhan Ch. Mirdha	1,687	1.24	
Independent	Prahlad Chandra Bhuyan	1,184	0.87	
RJP	Abida Begum	754	0.55	
FDLP	Pawan Panika	607	0.44	
Independent	Abdul Ali	480	0.35	
Independent	Debabrata Saikia	461	0.34	
SUCI(C)	Sona Ram Bora	284	0.20	
NOTA	None of the above	1,179	0.87	
Majority		5,169	3.81	
Turnout		1,35,506	83.85	
AGP hold		Swing		

== See also ==
- List of constituencies of Assam Legislative Assembly
