= New Guwahati Assembly constituency =

Assembly constituency of Assam

New Guwahati
- Constituency No. 35 for the Assam Legislative Assembly

Constituency details
- Country: India
- Region: Northeast India
- State: Assam
- Division: Lower Assam
- District: Kamrup Metropolitan
- Lok Sabha constituency: Guwahati
- Established: 2023
- Reservation: None

New Guwahati Assembly constituency is one of the 126 assembly constituencies of Assam, a northeastern state of India. It was formed in 2023.

== Members of Legislative Assembly ==
Year	Winner	Party
2026	Diplu Ranjan Sarmah	Bharatiya Janata Party

== Election Results ==
=== 2026 ===
2026 Assam Legislative Assembly election: New Guwahati
Party	Candidate	Votes	%	±%
BJP	Diplu Ranjan Sarmah	89,636	68.11	
INC	Santanu Borah	41,968	31.89	
NOTA	NOTA	3,574	2.56	
Margin of victory		47,668		
Turnout		139,764		
Rejected ballots				
Registered electors				
BJP win (new seat)				

== See also ==
- Kamrup Metropolitan district
- List of constituencies of Assam Legislative Assembly
- Government of Assam
- Government of India
