= UMFA =

UMFA may refer to:

- Ungmennafélag Álftaness, a multi-sports club in Iceland
- Ungmennafélagið Afturelding, a multi-sports club in Iceland, commonly known as Afturelding
- United Minorities Front, Assam, a former regional political party in Assam, India
- University of Manitoba Faculty Association (UMFA), Canada
- Utah Museum of Fine Arts, United States
