= Rupak Sarmah =

Indian politician

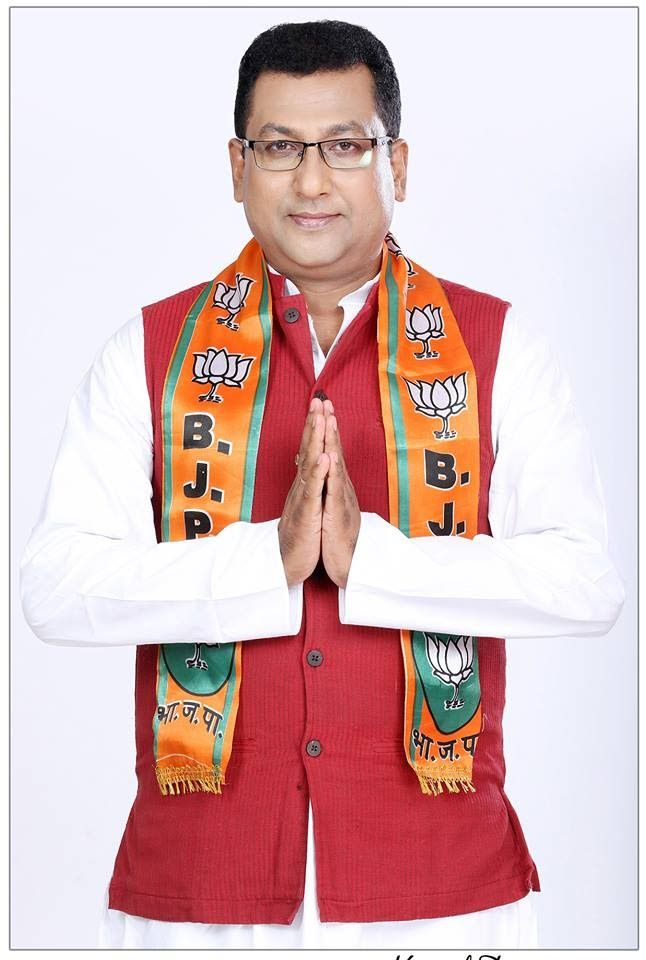

Rupak Sarmah is a Bharatiya Janata Party politician and lawmaker from Assam. He has been elected in Assam Legislative Assembly election in 2016 and 2021 from Nagaon- Batardava constituency.

Sarmah is a businessman by profession and a cultural worker. He is the President of Alumni Association, Nowgong College, a college of Assam. He was born in Nagaon, Assam.
