= Assam Movement =

Indian civil disobedience campaign

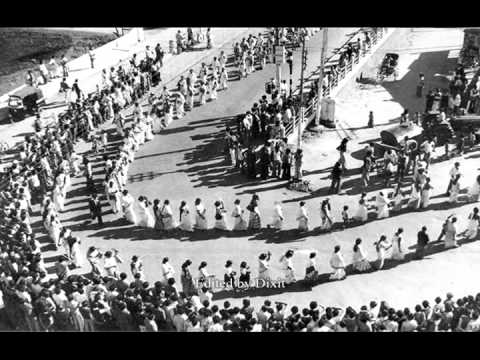
- A student rally during the Assam Movement
- Location: Assam, India
- Caused by: Improper inclusion of foreign nationals in electoral rolls
- Methods: Demonstrations, civil disobedience, rioting, lynching
- Concessions: Passage of the Illegal Migrants (Determination by Tribunals) Act

Parties
| All Assam Students Union, All Assam Gana Sangram Parishad | Government of India All Assam Minority Students' Union |

The Assam Movement, also known as the Anti-Foreigners Agitation, was a popular uprising in Assam, India, from 1979 to 1985, that demanded the Government of India detect, disenfranchise and deport illegal aliens. Led by All Assam Students Union (AASU) and All Assam Gana Sangram Parishad (AAGSP) the movement defined a six-year period of sustained civil disobedience campaigns, political instability and widespread ethnic violence. The movement ended in 1985 with the Assam Accord.

It was known since 1963 that foreign nationals had been improperly added to electoral rolls—and when the draft enrollments in Mangaldoi showed high number of non-citizens in 1979 AASU decided to campaign for thoroughly revised electoral rolls in the entire state of Assam by boycotting the 1980 Lok Sabha election. The Indira Gandhi government that followed could not accept the demands of the movement leaders as it came at considerable political cost and the movement escalated to economic blockades, oppression, violent pogroms and lasting ethnic conflict. The political nature of this movement was heavily debated among scholars in the journal Economic and Political Weekly. The accord became possible under the Rajiv Gandhi ministry when the emphasis was on negotiation and compromise which both sides made, and particularly because Rajiv Gandhi was less concerned with Congress (I)'s electoral fortunes.

The Assam Accord did not resolve the problem of foreigners' names in electoral rolls because the Illegal Migrants (Determination by Tribunals) Act, 1983 passed by Indira Gandhi's government soon after the 1983 elections made it practically impossible to prove anyone in Assam was an illegal alien.

== Background ==
=== Political Demography of Assam ===
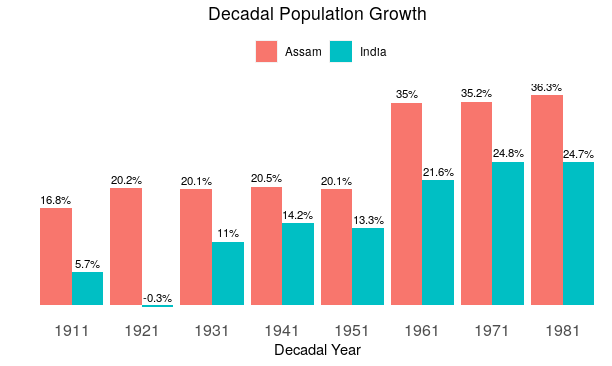
The decadal population growth of Assam against that of India.

1983 Estimates of Immigrant Arrivals
| Period | Estimate | Type |
|---|---|---|
| 1947–1951 | 274,000 | Refugee |
| 1951–1961 | 221,000 | Muslim Pakistani |
| 1961–1971 | 424,000 | Muslim Pakistani |
| 1971–1981 | 1,800,000 | All immigrants |

2016 Estimates of New Immigrants from Bangladesh/East Pakistan
| Period | Estimate |
|---|---|
| 1951–1961 | 295,785 |
| 1961–1971 | 312,495 |
| 1971–1991 | 1,121,949 |
| 1991–2001 | 1,742,044 |

2016 Estimates of Ever-Immigrants from Bangladesh/East Pakistan and their descendants
| Period | Estimate |
|---|---|
| 1961 | 295,785 |
| 1971 | 698,199 |
| 1991 | 2,121,770 |
| 2001 | 4,235,124 |

2019 Doubtful Voters in Final Draft of the NRC using 1971 Cut-off with Estimated Demographic Breakdown
| Demographic | Doubtful Citizenship |
|---|---|
| Total | 1,906,657 |
| Bangla Muslim | ~486,000 |
| Bangla Hindu | 500,000–690,000 |
| All Muslims | ~700,000 |
| Assamese Hindus | ~60,000 |

Assam, a Northeast Indian state, has been the fastest growing region in the Indian subcontinent for much of the 20th century with the population growing six-fold till the 1980s as against less than three-fold for India. Since the natural growth rate of Assam has been found to be less than the national rate, the difference can only be attributed to a net immigration.

Immigration in the 19th century was driven by British colonialism—tribal and low castes were brought in from central India to work as labourers in tea gardens and educated Hindu Bengalis from Bengal to fill administrative and professional positions. The largest group, Muslims peasants from Mymensingh, immigrated after about 1901—and they settled in Goalpara in the first decade and further up the Brahmaputra Valley in the next two decades. These major groups were joined by other smaller groups that settled as traders, merchants, bankers, moneylenders, and small industrialists. Yet another community who had settled in Assam were Nepali dairy farmers.

The British dismantled the older Ahom system, made Bengali the official language (Assamese was restored in 1874), and placed Hindu Bengalis in colonial administrative positions. By 1891 one-fourth of the population of Assam was of migrant origin. Assamese nationalism, which grew by the beginning of the 20th century, began to look at both the Hindu Bengalis as well as the British as alien rulers. The emerging Assamese literate class aspired to the same positions as those enjoyed by the Bengali Hindus, mostly from Sylhet.

The Bengali Muslims, who came in mainly from Mymensingh, were cultivators who occupied flood plains and cleared forests. They were not in conflict with the Assamese and did not align with the Bengali Hindus. In fact the Assamese elite encouraged their settlement. In the post-partition period as Assamese nationalists tried to dismantle Bengali Hindu dominance from the colonial period, the tea garden labourers as well as the Muslim Bengalis supported them. Ever mindful of being the neighbour of the populous and culturally dominant Bengali people, the Assamese were alarmed that immigration not only had continued illegally in the post-independence period but that illegal immigrants were being included in electoral rolls.

=== Cross-border immigration ===
Immigration from East Bengal to Assam became cross-border in character following the Partition of India—the 1951 census records 274,000 refugees between 1947 and 1951, most of who are estimated to be Hindu Bengalis. On the basis of a natural growth rate, it was estimated that the immigrants numbered 221,000 between 1951 and 1961. In 1971, the surplus over the natural growth was 424,000 and the estimated illegal immigrants from 1971 to 1981 was 1.8 million.

Immigration of Muslims from East Pakistan continued—though they declared India as the birth country and Assamese as their language, they recorded their religion correctly. As the immigration issue was growing the immigrant Muslims from Bengal supported the Assamese language movement—by accepting the Assamese language, supporting the official language act in contrast to the Bengali Hindus who opposed it, and casting their votes for the Congress.

==== Legal Instruments ====
The Assam Movement involved a tussle over the determination of immigrants, refugees and citizens as defined in their legal contexts. At the time of the Partition of India in 1947 when British India was divided into India and Pakistan the legal instrument prevalent that determined foreigners was the colonial-era The Foreigners Act, 1946. The law that determined Indian citizenship, The Citizenship Act 1955, was enacted a few years later in the context of the Constitution of India. In addition to these instruments, Assam had the National Register of Citizens for Assam (NRC) which was based on the 1951 census; no other Indian state had a similar document. At that time Assam constituted nearly the entire contiguous Northeast India and included the present-day Arunachal Pradesh, Nagaland, Mizoram and Meghalaya though it did not include Manipur and Tripura.

There were a number of attempts by the government to change the mechanisms of detecting foreigners or the meaning of Indian citizenship. In 1983 the Congress (I) government enacted the Illegal Migrants (Determnation by Tribunal) Act that modified the mechanism of determining foreigners in Assam, while keeping the old mechanism intact in the rest of the country. After the Supreme Court of India declared the Act unconstitutional in 2005, the government attempted to change the mechanism once again the same year, which too was declared unconstitutional the next year. The NRC was revised under the supervision of the Supreme Court of India and the final draft created in 2019. In 2019 the BJP government enacted the Citizenship (Amendment) Act, 2019 which created pathways to citizenship for immigrants of all religions except Islam, and since have refused to accept the draft NRC as a legal document.

==== Foreigners' Tribunals, 1964 ====
After the 1961 census, the Registrar General of India estimated, with inputs from intelligence reports, that there were about 220,000 "infiltrators" in Assam from East Pakistan. In 1962 the central government devolved its power to detect foreigners in Assam to district police and administrative heads and created Border Police units in some districts. In 1964 the Foreigners (Tribunal) Order was enacted that created a mechanism to verify the citizenship of suspected infiltrators; and though tribunals could be created anywhere in the country, they were used primarily in Assam. At first four tribunals were created—in the undivided districts of Goalpara, Kamrup, Darrang and Nawgong where most infiltrants from East Pakistan were expected to have settled—but by 1968 the number had gone up to nine. In these tribunals the hearings were conducted by a single person, usually a magistrate, an officer who then had both executive and judicial powers. Many of the suspected infiltrators were the illiterate poor and the big landowners, who benefited from the cheap labour they provided, gave them legal aid to defend themselves at the tribunals. Among the many criteria determining the citizenship of the accused, oral affidavits by locally known citizens and inclusion in the electoral rolls were two.

In 1965, during the run up to the Indo-Pakistani war, the Government of India directed the Assam Government to expel Pakistani (later Bangladesh) infiltrators but the implementation had to be given up when a number of Assam legislators threatened to resign. These tribunals were finally shut foen in 1972 on the claim of most infiltrators being caught; and also because after the Indo-Pakistani War of 1971 the adversarial East Pakistan was replaced by Bangladesh, a friendly nation.

==== Illegal Migrants (Determination by Tribunals) Act, 1983 ====
In the wake of the violence in the 1983 elections, the Indian government, led by Indira Gandhi, enacted the IM(DT) Act. This act was applicable only in Assam, whereas the rest of the country followed The Foreigners Act, 1946—the key difference was that whereas the onus of the proof of citizenship was with the accused, the IMDT Act put the onus of proof on the accuser. The Supreme Court of India repealed it in July 2005 as unconstitutional based on a public interest litigation filled by Sarbananda Sonowal, a former AASU student leader. In response, the Government of India passed the Foreigners (Tribunals for Assam) Order, 2005. This too was set aside by the Supreme Court in 2006.

=== Foreign nationals in electoral rolls ===
The Indian Ministry of External Affairs in 1963 reported for the first time that foreigners were being enlisted in Indian voters list by politically interested parties. Baruah (1986) remarks that ironically the position of the report is remarkably similar to the position taken by the Assam movement leaders at the end of the next decade. In August 1975, the Home Ministry had instructed the state governments to use criminal investigation departments to identify illegal aliens in electoral rolls. In October 1978 S. L. Shakdhar (the then Chief Election Commissioner) declared foreigners' names were being included in electoral rolls in a large scale and that this was done at the demand of political parties—a claim repeated by a cabinet minister in the Rajya Sabha in November 1978.

These reports were noticed in Assam—AASU included "expulsion of foreigners" in their sixteen-point charter of demands in July 1978; and after Shakdher's announcement in October 1978 it called for a three-day program of protest demanding "reservation of 80 percent jobs for locals".

==== Mangaldoi Lok Sabha by-election, 1979 ====
When the member of parliament from the Mangaldoi constituency died in March 1979 the Election Commission started the process for a by-election and in April 1979 published the draft electoral rolls and ordered a summary revision. Tribunals reviewed a list of about 47,000 doubtful names of which about 36,000 were processed—of these processed names 26,000 names (about 72 percent) were confirmed to be non-citizens. Though the issue of illegal aliens in electoral rolls had been simmering for some years at the national official level, the large numbers at Mangaldoi brought it into sharp public focus and provided the immediate trigger for the Assam Movement—AASU launched its first protest program on 8 June 1979 demanding the "detection, disenfranchisement and deportation" of foreigners.

The review process was opposed by political parties, especially the involvement of the police and the executive (and not judicial) officers, and the Chief Election Commissioner, Shakdhar, halted the activity of the tribunals—the final electoral list of Mangaldoi was never released. The Charan Singh government fell on 20 August 1979, the Lok Sabha was dissolved on 22 August 1979 and since fresh elections were announced the Mangaldoi by-election was cancelled. Shakdhar, who had earlier warned against foreigners' names in the electoral rolls announced a change his position in September 1979 and pushed the revision to after the 1980 general election polls.

=== Governments and electoral politics, 1979 to 1985 ===
==== Government of India and Parliament ====
The Assam Movement began at a time of transition in New Delhi during the Morarji Desai government, the first non-Congress central government in India. Morarji Desai had come to power in 1977 following Indira Gandhi's Emergency after a historic election in which Gandhi lost her membership in parliament. But Indira Gandhi was able to come back to power very soon—in 1978 she split the Congress party to better defend herself and regained membership of the Lok Sabha via a by-election in Chikmagalur, a seat vacated by a party-man; in July 1979 she was able to bring down the Desai government by promising support to Charan Singh, a breakaway leader; a month later she withdrew support to the Charan Singh government necessitating early general elections; and after the general elections in 1980 she became the prime minister once again. The 1980 elections were strongly opposed by the Assam Movement leaders, violence erupted, and polls in only 3 of the 14 constituencies could be held. Significantly, Indira Gandhi tried to seek Muslim support in that election by citing the Assam Movement. Indira Gandhi then led the Government of India's administrative and political response to the Assam Movement and negotiated with its leaders. In October 1984 she was assassinated and her son Rajiv Gandhi became the prime minister who, having won a landslide victory in the 1984 Indian general election, settled the Assam Movement and a few other conflicts in a flurry of accords.

The Assam Movement successfully scuttled the 1980 Indian general election in Assam except for two constituencies in the Barak Valley; and the 1984 Indian general election elections were not conducted in the state at the same time as the rest of the country—they were conducted alongside the 1985 Assam Legislative Assembly election after the Assam Accord was signed. As a result Assam was largely unrepresented in the entire 7th Lok Sabha and part of the 8th Lok Sabha.

==== Government of Assam and State Assembly ====
During the entire duration of the Assam Movement, the Assam state government had been unstable. Even though the electoral backlash against Indira Gandhi in the 1977 general election was not felt in Assam, her party was defeated in the 1978 election and Golap Borbora, a Janata Party leader, became the first non-Congress Chief Minister of Assam; it was a minority government set up with the support of PTCA and independents and outside support of the CPI(M) and other left parties. This government fell in September 1979 as a result of the split in the Janata Party and Jogendra Nath Hazarika became the chief minister with the support of the Congress, Congress (I) and the CPI. The Hazarika government too fell, within ninety four days in December 1979, when the Congress withdrew support and President's Rule was imposed for the first time in the state of Assam. Since the President's Rule could not be extended beyond a year Congress (I), originally with only 8 members, was able to attract defections from other parties, obtain the support of the CPI, and form a government in December 1980 under the leadership of Anwara Taimur, the only woman or Muslim to have been a chief minister in post-Indian Independence Assam's history. The movement leaders challenged the legitimacy of this government and refused to recognize it. In June 1981 the Anwara Taimur government fell in the state assembly and President's Rule was again imposed. There was another attempt to form a Congress (I) government in January 1982 under Keshab Chandra Gogoi, but it too fell and President's Rule was again imposed in March 1982. After each of the two Congress (I) governments fell, the Congress (I) led central government did not allow non-Congress government formations in the state.

At the end of the assembly term the 1983 Assam Legislative Assembly election was announced amidst expectation that there would be widespread violence and the situation was not conducive for election. The election was boycotted by the movement and a number of opposition political parties did not participate; and polling took place amidst extensive inter-ethnic violence. The Congress (I) won an overwhelming number of seats and Hiteshwar Saikia formed a government. This government had to compete with the movement for legitimacy; this assembly was dismissed prematurely in 1985 as a precondition of the Assam Accord and in the 1985 Assam Legislative Assembly election that followed the movement leaders won a majority.

== Parties and positions ==
=== AASU and AAGSP basic position ===
A foreigner is a foreigner; a foreigner shall not be judged by the language he speaks or the religion he follows. Communal considerations (either religious or linguistic) cannot be taken into account while determining the citizenship of a person; the secular character of the Constitution does not allow that.

(Emphasis in original, AASU and AAGSP 1980:6)

AASU and AAGSP position regarding illegal immigrants
| Period | Demand |
|---|---|
| 1951– | Review legal status of all aliens |
| 1951–1961 | Identify, probably give citizenship |
| 1961–1971 | Distribute throughout India |
| 1971– | Deport |

The Assam Movement was led by the All Assam Students Union (AASU) with Prafulla Mahanta (president) and Bhrigu Kumar Phukan (general secretary) as the public faces of it. The movement leadership was augmented by an organisation called All Assam Gana Sangram Parishad (AAGSP) that was constituted in August 1979 by representatives from civic and regional political parties. Even though the relationship of the Assam Movement to the earlier Assamese Language Movement was clear the leadership were careful to kept the issue of language out—instead they staked their claims purely on the basis of population statistics and constitutional rights and presented a set of demands that were secular and constitutionally legitimate. They clearly defined who they considered to be foreigners and tried to project the problem as not local but constitutional. Despite these formal positions and the demands structured around constitutional values, movement leaders did use ethnic themes for political mobilization. The Assam Accord that concluded the Movement, in its Clause 6, called for protection of the "Assamese people".

=== Congress (I) ===
Indira Gandhi (Congress (I)), who came to power after the 1980 Indian general election, provided the governmental position. She was the first prime minister to meet with the Movement leaders which she did in Delhi on 2 February 1980. She did not accept the demand to use the NRC 1951 and the Census report of 1952 as the basis for identifying foreigners and suggested 24 March 1971 as the cut-off date instead since she wanted to factor in the Liaquat–Nehru Pact of 8 April 1950 and her own agreement with Sheikh Mujibur Rahman in 1972. The cut-off date became the major stumbling block during the negotiations.

== Phased Developments ==
The duration of the Assam Movement could be divided into five phases.

=== Phase I: June 1979 to November 1980 ===
The general strike (a 12-hour bandh) on 8 June 1979, sponsored by the AASU, demanding the "detection, disenfranchisement, and deportation" of foreigners could be considered as the beginning of the Assam Movement. This was followed by the formation of the All Assam Gana Sangram Parishad, an ad hoc coalition of different political and cultural organizations, on 26 August 1979 At the initial stage the protests were peaceful and the movement enjoyed wide popular support especially among the Assamese people as the Satyagraha program from 12 to 17 November 1979 demonstrated when estimated 700,000 in Guwahati and 2 million in the entire state courted voluntary arrests; but by the end of November, the initial optimism of a negotiated settlement gave way to pessimism.

The AASU leadership decided to oppose the 1980 general elections in Assam without a revision of the rolls. On 26 November a delegation of 17 student leaders submitted a memorandum to the president Neelam Sanjiva Reddy to stall the election, and the Home Minister held a meeting two days later to discuss the issue with opposition leaders and the Assam Chief Minister, but there was no solution. On 27 November 1979 AASU-AAGSP escalated the protests and called for the closure of all educational institutes and picketing in state and central government offices. In December 1979, the civil disobedience was extended with an economic blockade of crude oil and plywood. Nevertheless, neither the civil disobedience nor the economic blockade created any major confrontation between the agitators and the state since the movement had wide support among the state government officials.

==== General Election, 1980 ====
On 2 December 1979 Shakdar, the CEC, decided to go ahead with polling in Assam with the claim that the rolls for 110 of the 126 Assembly constituencies were ready and those for the rest will be ready the next day. Mass picketing was arranged in front of all polling offices where candidate filed their nominations, in the first week of December 1979. No candidates were allowed to file nomination papers in the Brahmaputra Valley. On 10 December, the last date for submitting the nomination papers, was declared as a statewide bandh. The government proclaimed a curfew at different parts of the state, including the major city of Guwahati.

At Barpeta, then IGP K.P.S. Gill led the police force in escorting Begam Abida Ahmed to file nomination papers; they attacked protestors. Khargeswar Talukdar, the 22-year-old general secretary of Barpeta AASU Unit, was beaten to death and thrown into a ditch next to the highway at Bhabanipur. Talukdar was honoured by the Assam Movement as its first Martyr. The Hazarika government was dismissed and President's Rule was imposed on 12 December 1979.

Elections were held in only two of the fourteen Lok Sabha Constituencies in the 1980 Indian general election: Karimganj and Silchar.

=== Phase II: December 1980 to January 1983 ===
On 7 October 1982, while leading a procession from Nagaon to Hojai in support of a bandh called by the All Assam Students Union, Anil Bora was beaten to death at Hojai by people who opposed the bandh as well as the Movement.

=== Phase III: Election of 1983 ===
This was a very critical and consequential period not only for the movement, but for the subsequent times as well. The Indira Gandhi-led government imposed assembly elections in the state as a challenge to the movement leading to widespread ethnic violence and breakdown of political order. The two-month old Keshab Gogoi government had fallen and the assembly dissolved on 19 March 1982, and under the then constitutional rules, a fresh election had to be held within a year. An amendment to the constitution to allow the maximum allowed period of President's Rule to two years, which required a two-third majority in Parliament to pass, was discussed but the effort was abandoned due to a lack of political alignment of the Congress (I), the left, and the opposition parties. By December 1982 there had been twenty-three rounds of talks between the government and the movement leaders to resolve the issue of identifying foreigners' names in electoral rolls; but the two parties found the biggest point of contention was the cut-off date to identify them.

In a conversation with journalist Shekhar Gupta in December 1982 the electoral campaign manager of the Congress (I), Rajesh Pilot, stated that the government intended to hold elections to politically finish the movement leaders.

==== Election and boycott ====
Even as the AASU-AAGSP leadership was returning to Guwahati on 6 January 1983 from yet another failed talk at New Delhi, the government announced that elections will be held with staggered polling on 14, 17, and 20 February 1983. The election was to use the unchanged 1979 electoral rolls—which meant the electoral rolls were corrected neither on the basis of 1951 which the movement leaders wanted nor on the basis of 1971 which the government was ready to accept; and it did not incorporate the names of those who had come of age to vote after 1979; though the Supreme Court of India ruled in 1984 that the 1979 electoral rolls were legally valid. The AASU-AAGSP leaders were arrested when they landed at the Guwahati airport, and the Government of Assam imposed censorship on two local newspapers that supported the movement. The issue for this election was to primarily hold the elections with the expectation that a moderate to high polling rate would weaken the movement; and the movement leaders boycotted the elections. A private citizen challenged the elections in the Gauhati High Court on the argument that the 1979 electoral rolls were not available to the public, as required, but the government was able to avert legal intervention by advancing the election notification.

Nagen Sarma and Nurul Hussain temporarily replaced the AASU leaders arrested on 6 January, and they along with the All Guwahati Students' Union and the All Kamrup District Students' Union organised the anti-election campaign. Besides Congress (I), the Left Democratic Alliance (Congress (S), CPI(M), CPI, RCPI, SUCI and RSP) and the PTCA decided to participate in the elections. The two Lok Dal factions, the Bharatiya Janata Party and the Janata Party, on the other hand, did not participate. The movement leaders decided to frame the elections as a do or die phase, calling the boycott "Assam's last struggle for survival", and used all means to stop the elections. They had the support not only of the extremist student activists, but also the majority of the local Assamese citizens. The movement leaders were thus able to revive the movement which had stagnated from 1981 to 1982.

==== Nomination, Campaign and Polling ====
The boycott program during the nomination period included blocking access to nominating centers by the general public, and local administration officers too agreed to a call to stay away from their duties. The government was aware of the possibility of poll disruption and violation and staggered the polling over three days; and it brought in 8000 officers from other states, additional battalions from CRPF, Haryana, Rajasthan, Uttar Pradesh, BSF and Home Guards for a total of 150,000 armed personnel—one armed man for every 57 voters. The protests against the election were widespread and included road blockages, bridge burning, kidnapping, attacks on election candidates their relatives, political workers, and poll officers.

The political party leaders made inflammatory speeches during the campaign—the railway minister Ghani Khan Choudhury from Congress appealed to the Bengali Muslim immigrants to retaliate in kind to violence, and Atal Bihari Vajpayee warned of dire consequences if elections were held. On 10 February, Indira Gandhi warned the immigrant Muslim community in the then Nagaon district that if they did not vote for Congress they would have to leave the state.

==== Inter-group violence ====
The pro- vs anti- election violence eventually led to complete breakdown of ethnic amity beyond mere Assamese-Bengali or Hindu-Muslim divide where every group clashed against every other group: at Nellie (Tiwas against immigrant Muslims); Kokrajhar (Boro Kacharis against Bengali Hindus and Muslims); Goreswar and Khoirabari (Sarania and Boro against Bengali Hindus); Gohpur (Boro against Assamese Hindus); Dhemaji and Jonai (Mising tribals against Bengali Hindus and Muslims); Samaguri (Muslims against Hindus); Dhaila and Thekrabari (Muslims against Hindus); Chaowlkhowa Chapori (Assamese Hindus and Muslims against Bengali Muslims). On 18 February 1983, during the Nellie massacre, a mob — primarily composed of indigenous Tiwas and semi-indigenous lower caste Hindus — killed thousands of suspected muslim immigrants, in 14 villages in Nagaon district.

== Memorial ==
Swahid Smarak Kshetra is a memorial and park in Boragaon, Guwahati, Assam, India, commemorating 860 agitators who lost their lives during the movement.

== See also ==
- Assamese language movement
- All Assam Students Union
- Asom Gana Sangram Parishad
- Asom Gana Parishad
