= Renuka Devi Barkataki =

Indian politician

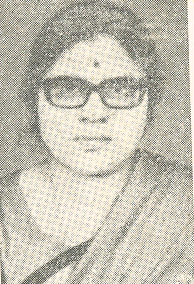

Union Minister of State for Education, Social Welfare, Culture
- In office August 1977 – 15 July 1979
- Prime Minister: Morarji Desai
- Minister: Pratap Chandra Chunder

Member of Parliament, Lok Sabha
- In office 23 March 1977 – 22 August 1979
- Preceded by: Dinesh Goswami
- Succeeded by: Dinesh Goswami
- Constituency: Gauhati
- In office 2 April 1962 – 3 March 1967
- Preceded by: Beli Ram Das
- Succeeded by: Fakhruddin Ali Ahmed
- Constituency: Barpeta

Deputy Leader of the Opposition Assam Legislative Assembly
- In office 1972 - 1977
- Chief Minister: Sarat Chandra Sinha

Member of Assam Legislative Assembly
- In office 1972 - 1977
- Preceded by: Bishnuram Medhi
- Succeeded by: Rabindra Nath Malakar
- Constituency: Hajo

Personal details
- Born: 29 November 1932
- Died: 14 August 2017 (aged 84)
- Party: Janata Party (1977-1979)
- Other political affiliations: Indian National Congress (1962-1967); Indian National Congress (Organisation) (1967-1972); Independent (1972-1977)
- Spouse: Munindra Nath Barkataki (m. 1959, died)
- Children: Meenaxi
- Parent(s): Rudra Kanta Sarma (Father); Dharmeswari Devi (Mother)
- Education: Cotton College

Renuka Devi Barkataki (1932 - 2017) was an Indian politician from Assam. She was the Union Minister of state for education, social welfare and culture in the Janata Party government led by prime minister Morarji Desai from 1977 to 1979. In 1962, she was elected to the 3rd Lok Sabha from Barpeta constituency as an Indian National Congress candidate. In 1972, she was elected to the Assam legislative Assembly from Hajo constituency. In 1977, she was elected to the 6th Lok Sabha from Gauhati constituency as a Janata Party candidate. Later, she became the honorary secretary of the Assam state branch of the Indian Red Cross Society. She died on 14 August 2017 in a government hospital due to injuries.
