= Bhabesh Kalita =

Indian politician

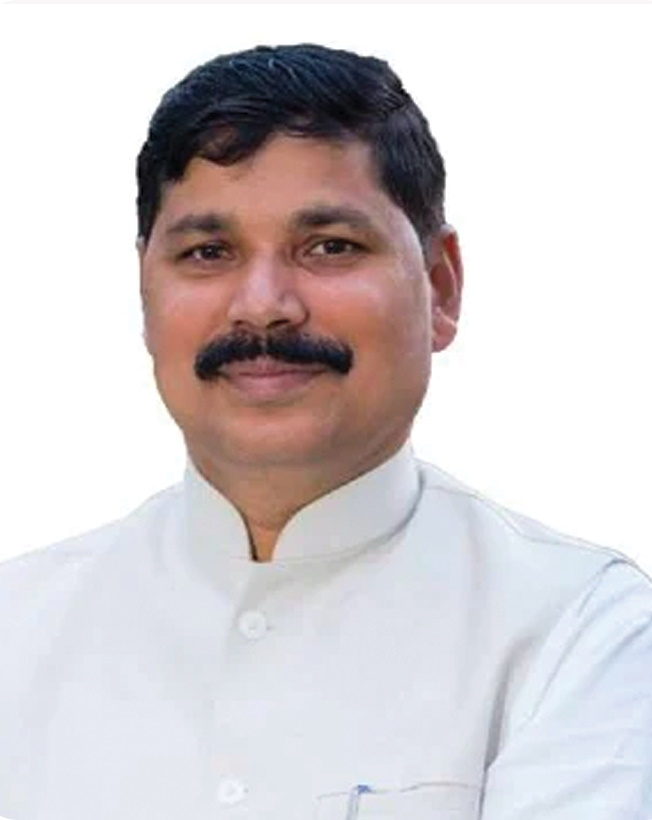
- Official portrait

President of the Bharatiya Janata Party, Assam
- In office 26 June 2021 – 17 January 2025
- Preceded by: Ranjit Kumar Das
- Succeeded by: Dilip Saikia

Minister of State, Government of Assam
- In office 26 April 2018 – 10 May 2021
- Chief Minister: Sarbananda Sonowal
- Portfolios: Irrigation (Independent charge); Revenue and Disaster Management; Education

Member, Assam Legislative Assembly
- Incumbent
- Assumed office 19 May 2016
- Preceded by: Ghanashyam Kalita
- Constituency: Rangiya

Personal details
- Born: 1 March 1972 (age 54)
- Party: Bharatiya Janata Party
- Other political affiliations: Indian National Congress
- Education: Pragjyotish College (BSc); Guwahati University Law College (LLB)
- Profession: Politician; Businessman

Bhabesh Kalita (born 1 March 1972) is an Indian politician and businessman of Bharatiya Janata Party from Assam who served as the President of BJP, Assam state unit from 2021 to 2025. He represents the Rangiya constituency in the Assam Legislative Assembly since 2016. He joined the BJP in 1991 and was secretary of the BJP, Assam state unit in 2006 to 2011 and general secretary from 2011. He was Minister of State (Independent Charge) for Irrigation and Minister of State for Education in the Sarbananda Sonowal ministry from 2016 to 2021.
