= Dinesh Goswami =

Indian politician

Minister of Law and Justice
- In office 1989–1990
- Prime Minister: V. P. Singh
- Preceded by: B. Shankaranand
- Succeeded by: Subramanian Swamy

Member of Parliament, Rajya Sabha
- In office 1978-1984 ,1990-1991
- Constituency: Assam

Member of Parliament, Lok Sabha
- In office 1971-1977
- Preceded by: Dhireswar Kalita
- Succeeded by: Renuka Devi Barkataki
- In office 1985-1989
- Succeeded by: Kirip Chaliha
- Constituency: Gauhati, Assam

Personal details
- Born: 27 May 1935 Pakasatra, Kamrup District, Assam, British India
- Died: 3 June 1991 (aged 56)
- Party: Asom Gana Parishad
- Spouse: Bibha Goswami
- Children: One son and Daughter

Dinesh Goswami was an Indian politician. He was the Law and Justice Minister under the V.P. Singh government in 1989. He was elected to the Lok Sabha, lower house of the Parliament of India, from the Gauhati constituency in 1985. He was also a member of the Rajya Sabha, upper house of parliament, from Assam.

He was killed in a car accident on 2 June 1991, in his home state of Assam.
