= Asom Gana Parishad (Pragatishel) =

- Leader: Prafulla Kumar Mahanta
- Founded: 2006
- Headquarters: G.S. Road, Ulubari, Guwahati
- Ideology: Regionalism; Ethnic nationalism
- Political position: Centre-right
- ECI Status: Unrecognised State Party

Election symbol
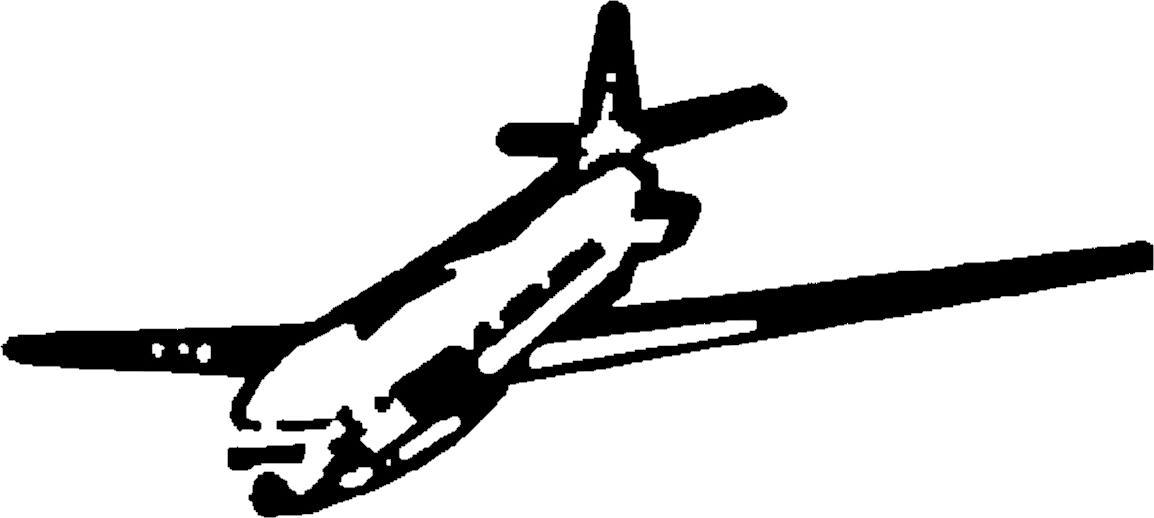

Asom Gana Parishad (Progressive), or AGP(P), was a regional political party in Assam, India. It was formed on 15 September 2005 by Prafulla Kumar Mahanta after he was expelled in 2005 by the Asom Gana Parishad for anti-party activities.

In the 2006 Assembly elections, the party won just one seat; namely that of Prafulla Kumar Mahanta.

In 2008, the party merged again with Asom Gana Parishad.

== Members of Legislative Assembly ==
Members of Assam Legislative Assembly
Year	Sr. no.	Portrait	Name	Constituency	Margin
2006 Assam Legislative Assembly election	1.		Prafulla Kumar Mahanta	Barhampur Assembly constituency	19,701
