= Rangiya Assembly constituency =

Constituency of the Assam legislative assembly in India

Rangiya
- Constituency No. 31 for the Assam Legislative Assembly

Constituency details
- Country: India
- Region: Northeast India
- State: Assam
- Division: Lower Assam
- District: Kamrup
- Lok Sabha constituency: Darrang–Udalguri
- Established: 1951
- Reservation: None

Member of Legislative Assembly
- 16th Assam Legislative Assembly
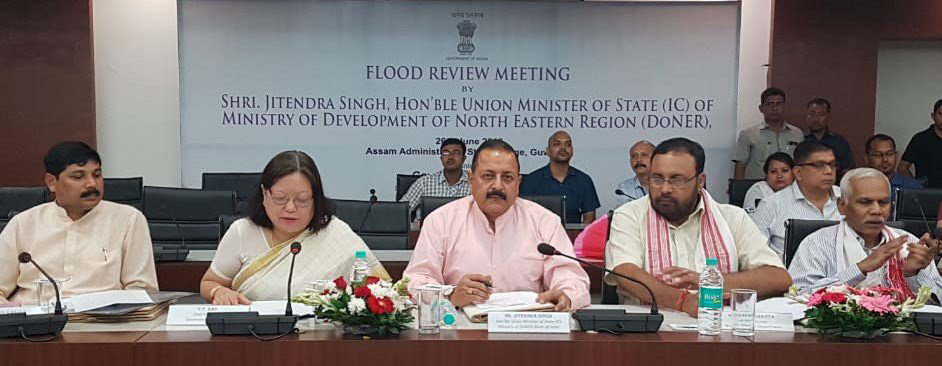
- Incumbent Bhabesh Kalita
- Party: BJP
- Alliance: National Democratic Alliance
- Elected year: 2026

Rangiya Assembly constituency is one of the assembly constituencies of the Assam Legislative Assembly. Rangiya Assembly constituency was established in 1951. Rangiya forms part of the Darrang–Udalguri Lok Sabha constituency. Bhabesh Kalita represents this constituency.

== Members of Legislative Assembly ==
Election	Name	Party
1951	Siddhinath Sarma	Indian National Congress
1957	Constituency abolished	
1962	Siddhinath Sarma	Indian National Congress
1967	K. M. Sarma	Communist Party of India
1972	Manabendranath Sarma	Indian National Congress
1978	Purna Boro	Communist Party of India (Marxist)
1983	Purna Boro	Communist Party of India (Marxist)
1985	Thaneswar Boro	Independent politician
1991	Thaneswar Boro	Asom Gana Parishad
1996	Thaneswar Boro	Asom Gana Parishad
2001	Bhubaneswar Kalita	Indian National Congress
2006	Ananta Deka	Communist Party of India (Marxist)
2011	Ghanashyam Kalita	Indian National Congress
2016	Bhabesh Kalita	Bharatiya Janata Party
2021	Bhabesh Kalita	Bharatiya Janata Party
2026	Bhabesh Kalita	Bharatiya Janata Party

== Election results ==
=== 2026 ===
2026 Assam Legislative Assembly election: Rangiya
Party	Candidate	Votes	%	±%
BJP	Bhabesh Kalita	107,929	58.22	+5.49
INC	Pranjit Choudhary	73,900	39.87	N/A
NOTA	NOTA	3,539	1.91	+0.72
Margin of victory		34,029	18.36	+5.79
Turnout		181,829	86.89	+1.91
Rejected ballots				
Registered electors		209,271		+10.53
BJP hold		Swing		

=== 2021 ===
2021 Assam Legislative Assembly election: Rangiya
Party	Candidate	Votes	%	±%
BJP	Bhabesh Kalita	84,844	52.73	+12.01
CPI(M)	Dr. Bhagwan Dev Mishra	64,624	40.16	+31.61
AJP	Dr. Babulal Sahariah	3,560	2.21	New
Independent	Hareswar Barman	3,505	2.18	New
NOTA	None of the above	1,905	1.19	+0.57
Majority		20,220	12.57	−9.81
Turnout		160,897	84.98	+0.45
Registered electors		189,336		+11.70
BJP hold		Swing		

=== 2016 ===
2016 Assam Legislative Assembly election: Rangiya
Party	Candidate	Votes	%	±%
BJP	Bhabesh Kalita	58,353	40.72	
INC	Ghanashyam Kalita	26,286	18.34	
Independent	Mrinal Deka	17,772	12.40	
AIUDF	Abdul Samad Choudhury	14,411	10.05	
CPI(M)	Ananta Deka	12,261	8.55	
Independent	Thaneswar Boro	5,358	3.73	
Independent	Samsul Haque	4,472	3.12	
Independent	Pabitra Baro	1,230	0.85	
Independent	Rajib Kakoti	1,066	0.74	
Independent	Biswajit Brahma	616	0.42	
Independent	Babul Baro	570	0.39	
NOTA	None of the above	892	0.62	
Majority		32,067	22.38	
Turnout		1,43,287	84.53	
Registered electors		1,69,500		
BJP gain from INC		Swing		
