= Joyasree Goswami Mahanta =

Indian politician

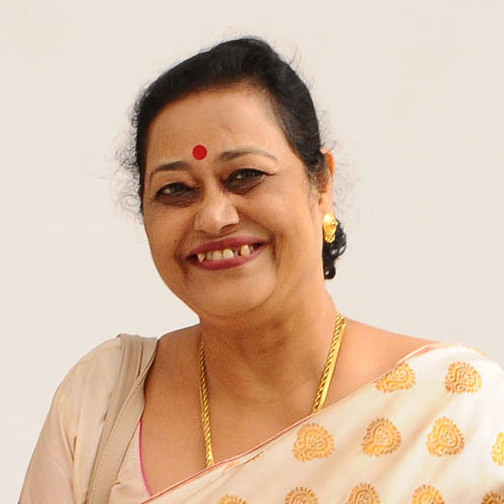

Member of Parliament, Rajya Sabha
- In office 1999-2001
- Constituency: Assam

Personal details
- Born: 1 January 1960 (age 66)
- Party: Asom Gana Parishad
- Spouse: Prafulla Kumar Mahanta
- Awards: Padma Shri, 2018

Joyasree Goswami Mahanta is an Indian politician. She was a Member of Parliament, representing Assam in the Rajya Sabha, the upper house of India's Parliament, as a member of the Asom Gana Parishad. She is an Assamese language writer and educationist. She was awarded India's fourth highest civilian award the Padma Shri in 2018.
