= Asom Gana Sangram Parishad =

Indian political party in Assam

Asom Gana Sangram Parishad (Assam Popular Struggle Association), a political party in the Indian state of Assam. AGSP was launched by the Asom Jatiyatabadi Yuva Chatra Parishad (AJYCP) in 1999. Party president is Jatindra Kumar Borgohain.

In the 2001 state legislative assembly polls in the state, AGSP joined the Rashtriya Democratic Alliance led by the Nationalist Congress Party.

Originally, the All Asom Gana Sangram Parishad (AGSP), it was a students body which was one of the groups that signed the Assam Accord, an agreement after the culmination of six year-long Assam agitation from 1979 to 1985. The All Assam Students Union is the other signatory, that signed the 'Accord', in the presence of the then prime minister Rajiv Gandhi.
