= What the Fields Remember =

- Directed by: Subasri Krishnan
- Release date: 2015
- Country: India
- Language: Bengali with English subtitles

What the Fields Remember is a documentary film based on the Nellie massacre. It was produced by the Public Service Broadcasting Trust and directed by Subasri Krishnan.

== Synopsis ==
The documentary revisits the Nellie massacre three decades later from the survivors, Sirajuddin Ahmed and Abdul Khayer's, retelling of the event, and their struggles of coping with loss and memories that refuse to fade away.

== Cast ==
- Research, Script and Director – Subasri Krishnan
- Cinematography and Editing – Amit Mahanti
- Location, Sound and Sound Design/Mix – Julius L. Basaiawmoit
- Editing Consultant – Sameera Jain
- Translation and Transcription – Bedatri D. Choudhury
- Graphics – Chandan Gorana
- Producer – Rajiv Mehrotra (for PSBT)
- Executive Producers – Tulika Srivastava and Ridhima Mehra
