= Beli Ram Das =

Indian politician

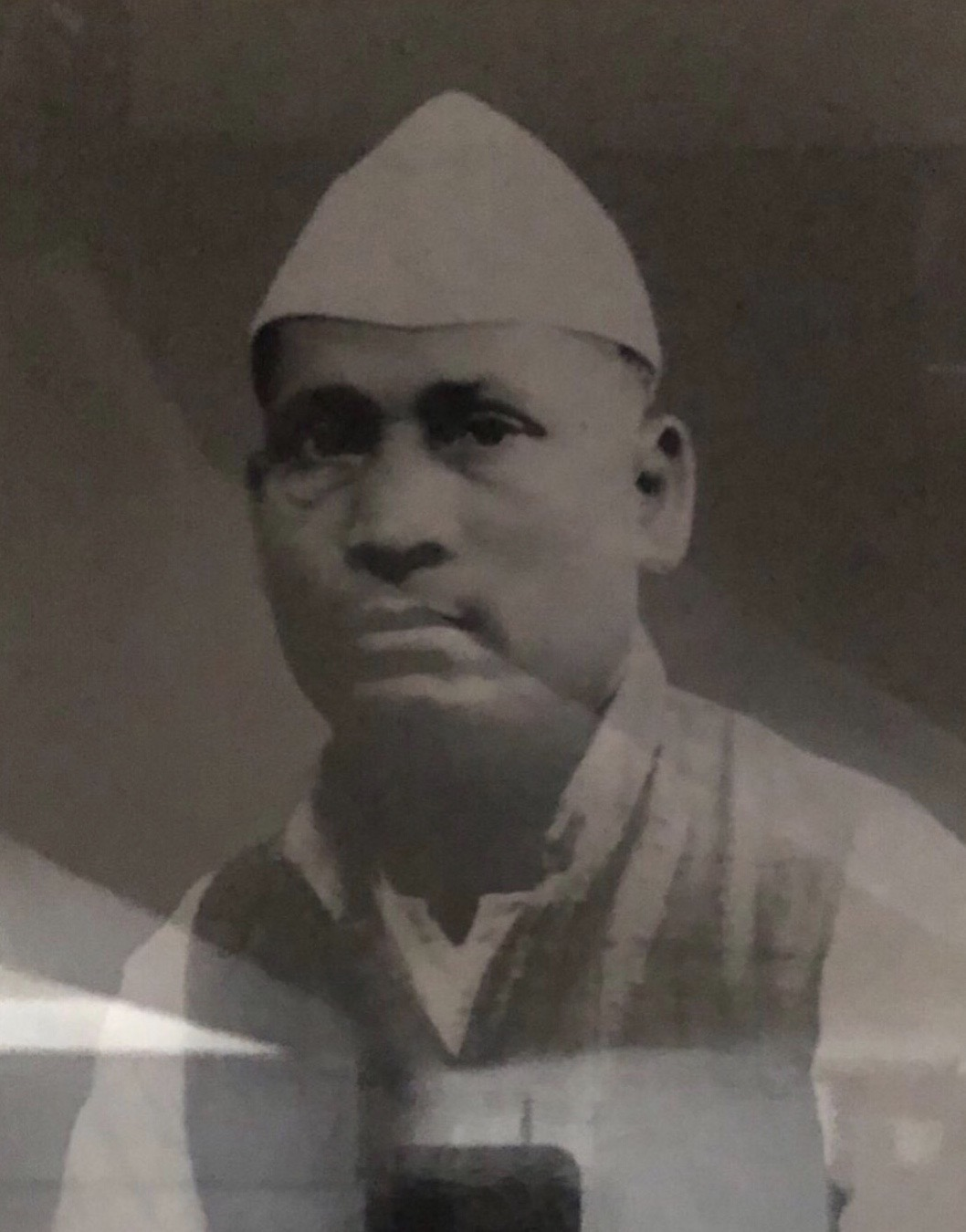

Member of Parliament, Lok Sabha
- In office 1952-1957
- Succeeded by: Renuka Devi Barkataki
- Constituency: Barpeta, Assam

Personal details
- Born: October 1908 Palasbari, Kamrup district, Assam, British India
- Died: 14 January 1969 (aged 60)
- Party: Indian National Congress
- Spouse: Damayanti Das
- Children: 2 Son and 5 Daughters

Beli Ram Das (October 1908 – 14 January 1969) was an Indian politician who was elected to the Lok Sabha, lower house of the Parliament of India from the Barpeta constituency Assam in 1952. He was also a member of the Assam Legislative Assembly from 1946 to 1952.
