= David Ledger =

Indian politician

Member of Parliament, Rajya Sabha
- In office 1989-1995
- Constituency: Assam

Personal details
- Born: 10 January 1951 (age 75)
- Party: Indian National Congress
- Spouse: Mary Ratna Ledger

David Ledger is an Indian politician. He was a Member of Parliament, representing Assam in the Rajya Sabha the upper house of India's Parliament as a member of the Indian National Congress.
