= Bijoya Chakravarty =

Indian politician

Smt. Bijoya Chakravarty
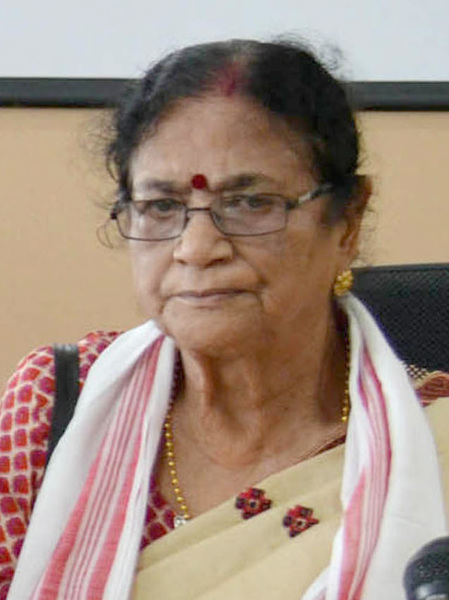
- Official portrait, 2015

Member of Parliament, Lok Sabha
- In office 16 May 2009 – 23 May 2019
- Preceded by: Kirip Chaliha
- Succeeded by: Queen Oja
- In office 13 May 1999 – 13 May 2004
- Preceded by: Bhubaneshwar Kalita
- Succeeded by: Kirip Chaliha
- Constituency: Gauhati

Union Minister of State for Water Resources, Government of India
- In office 13 May 1999 – 13 May 2004
- Prime Minister: Atal Bihari Vajpayee

Member of Parliament, Rajya Sabha
- In office 1986–1992
- Constituency: Assam

Personal details
- Born: 7 October 1939 (age 86) Baligaon, Jorhat, Assam Province, British India
- Party: Bharatiya Janata Party
- Other political affiliations: Asom Gana Parishad
- Spouse: Jiten Chakravarty (m. 1965)
- Children: 2 (including Suman Haripriya)
- Education: Gauhati University (M.A), Banaras Hindu University
- Website: Profile

Bijoya Chakravarty (born 7 October 1939) is an Indian politician of Bharatiya Janata Party. She served as the Member of the Lok Sabha from Gauhati from 1999 to 2004 and from 2009 to 2019. She was the Union Minister of State for Water Resources from 1999 to 2004. She was also the Member of the Rajya Sabha from 1986 to 1992 as a member of the Asom Gana Parishad. She was one of the first members of the Bharatiya Janata Party. She was awarded India's fourth highest civilian award the Padma Shri in 2021.

== Background ==
Bijoya began her political career in the Janata Party. She subsequently joined the regional Asom Gana Parishad and served in the Rajya Sabha from 1986 to 1992. Following her stint in the Rajya Sabha, she joined the Bhartiya Janata Party.

She represented the Gauhati in the 13th Lok Sabha. She won this seat for the BJP for the first time ever in 1999. Under the premiership of Atal Bihari Vajpayee, she served as the Union Minister of State for Water Resources. In 2004, the BJP decided to field singer Bhupen Hazarika in her place, causing widespread protests from BJP party workers. Hazarika lost the elections. The BJP understood its mistake and re-nominated Bijoya in the 2009 Lok Sabha election from the Gauhati seat. As a result, she again won the seat in 2009 and 2014 representing the BJP.

== Personal life ==
Chakravarty was born to B.K. Thakur and Mukhyada Thakur on 7 October 1939 in Baligaon village of Jorhat district in Assam. A post graduate with Masters of Arts in English language, she received her education from Guwahati University and Banaras Hindu University. She married Jiten Chakravarty on 1 June 1965, with whom she has a son and a daughter. Her daughter Suman Haripriya was elected to the Assam Legislative Assembly election in 2016 from Hajo Vidhan Sabha constituency.

Her son, Ranajit Chakravarty, died in May 2017 at the age of 49.

== Positions held ==
- 1977–1979 District Secretary, Janata Party, Mangaldoi (Assam)
- 1986–1992 Member of parliament, Rajya Sabha of Asom Gana Parishad
- 1999–2004 Member of parliament, Lok Sabha representing Gauhati (Assam)
- 1999–2004 Union Minister of State for Water Resources
- 2007–present National Vice-president, Bhartiya Janata Party
