= Bhrigu Phukan =

Indian politician

Member of Legislative Assembly Jalukbari constituency
- In office 1985–2001
- Preceded by: Shah Jalal Ali
- Succeeded by: Himanta Biswa Sarma
- Constituency: Jalukbari

Home Minister of Assam
- In office 1985–1990

Personal details
- Born: 7 April 1956 Sibsagar, Assam
- Died: 20 March 2006 (aged 49) All India Institute of Medical Sciences, New Delhi
- Party: Asom Gana Parishad (1985–1991, 1994–1996, 2001–2006)
- Other political affiliations: Natun Asom Gana Parishad (1991–1994); Nationalist Congress Party (1996–2001)
- Spouse: Indira Phukan
- Children: Upasa Phukan
- Education: Dibrugarh University; Gauhati University
- Occupation: Politician

Bhrigu Phukan (7 April 1956 – 20 March 2006) was an Indian politician, a leader of Asom Gana Parishad and cabinet minister in the Government of Assam in the First Mahanta Ministry. He was one of the three signatories to the Assam Accord. Phukan was born on 25 April 1956. From 1985, he was elected to the Assam Legislative Assembly for three consecutive terms from the prestigious Jalukbari constituency.

== Early life ==
He was a graduate of Dibrugarh University. He also obtained a law degree from Gauhati University. He became closely involved in the students union movement during the university days that catapulted him to its leadership. He had been in the vanguard of the anti-foreigners agitation for six years during which period Assam was rocked by unprecedented blood-letting which left close to 900 people dead.

== Political career ==
He was the general secretary of All Assam Students Union during 1979-85 and jointly spearheaded the Assam Movement with Prafulla Kumar Mahanta over the issue of Bangladeshi influx. He was one of the three signatories of the Assam Accord of 1985 along with Prafulla Kumar Mahanta.

In 1985 after the conclusion of the Assam movement with the signing of the historic Assam Accord, peace was restored in the state, and Phukan along with others founded the Asom Gana Parishad. In December 1985, he became Home minister at the age of 29 after the Asom Gana Parishad won the historic Assembly elections under the Chief Ministership of Mahanta. Phukan later fell out with Mahanta and in February 1991 walked out of Asom Gana Parishad to form the Natun Asom Gana Parishad.

The two factions united three years later and Phukan was appointed executive president of the Asom Gana Parishad. He quit the Asom Gana Parishad again in 1996 following differences with Mahanta and joined another political party.

In 2001, Phukan lost as a Nationalist Congress Party candidate to Himanta Biswa Sarma of the Congress, a student leader whom he had earlier groomed and who joined the BJP in 2015.

Phukan again returned to the Asom Gana Parishad in 2004 and contested the Lok Sabha (parliament) elections from Guwahati constituency but lost.

== Personal life ==
He died of multiple organ failure on 20 March 2006 at the All India Institute of Medical Sciences, New Delhi and is survived by his wife Indira and a daughter Upasa.
