= Vijay Kumar Gupta =

Indian politician in Assam

Member of the Assam Legislative Assembly
- Incumbent
- Assumed office 4 May 2026
- Constituency: Guwahati Central

Personal details
- Born: 1956 (age 69–70)
- Party: Bharatiya Janata Party
- Profession: Politician

Vijay Kumar Gupta (born 1956) is an Indian politician from Assam. He is a member of Assam Legislative Assembly, from Guwahati Central Assembly constituency in Kamrup Metropolitan district representing the Bharatiya Janata Party.

== Early life ==
Gupta is from Guwahati, Assam. He is the son of the late Mahatam Prasad Gupta. He completed his Bachelor of Science at a college affiliated with University of Gorakhpur in 1974. He runs his own business. He declared assets worth Rs.8 crore in his affidavit to the Election Commission of India.

== Career ==
Gupta won the Guwahati Central Assembly constituency representing the Bharatiya Janata Party in the 2026 Assam Legislative Assembly election. He polled 1,01,927 votes and defeated his nearest rival, Kunki Chowdhury of the Assam Jatiya Parishad, by a margin of 61,921 votes.
