= Dhireswar Kalita =

Indian politician

Dhireswar Kalita (22 April 1922 – 14 January 1997) was an Indian politician who was a leader in the Communist Party of India. He represented the Gauhati Lok Sabha constituency from 1967 to 1971.

Kalita had previously been associated with Congress as a student up to 1943, and was a member of the Gauhati Local Board. He was a member of the Gauhati University Court for six years. As Student Federation volunteer he served in Burma refugee camps in Pandu and in Gauhati in 1941. During the Bengal famine, he managed a destitute home at Gauhati from 1943 to 1944.

Kalita died in Guwahati on 14 January 1997, at the age of 74.
