= Nurul Hussain =

18th Speaker of the Assam Legislative Assembly

Nurul Hussain is an Asom Gana Parishad politician from Assam. He was elected to the Assam Legislative Assembly in the 1996 and 2001 elections from Hajo constituency.
