= Girindra Kumar Baruah =

Indian politician

Girindra Kumar Baruah is an Indian politician in Assam. He represented Barhampur in the Assam Legislative Assembly during 1985–90. In 1996, he won Nowgong Sadar Assembly Constituency and represented it till 2011, when he lost to Indian National Congress candidate Durlabh Chamua.
