= All Assam Minority Students' Union =

Student organisation in Assam, India

All Assam Minorities Students' Union (AAMSU)
- Abbreviation: AAMSU
- Formation: 31 March 1980; 46 years ago
- Type: Student organization
- Headquarters: Guwahati
- Region served: Assam, India
- President: Advocate Imtiaz Hussain
- General Secretaries: Minnatul Islam Kuddus Ali Sarkar
- Information and Technology Secretary: Advocate Md Aminur Rahman

All Assam Minorities Students' Union (AAMSU) is a student organization from the religious and linguistic minorities communities of Assam. It was formed in 1980, on the eve of Assam movement, to safeguard the interest of the minorities social rights and their strangle and held rallies in Barpeta and shouting slogs of Jay Aay Asom . It claims to be fighting for the minorities facing persecution at the hands of government.

== History ==
The union was formed on 31 March 1980. A convention took place at Jaleswar, Goalpara from 29–30 March. Two Assamese leaders of Congress (I), Lolit Doley and Dhrubanaryan Barua, addressed the convention.

Abdul Hai Nagori and Azghar Ali were the first President and Secretary of the union, respectively. Mukshed Ali, advocate drafted its constitution.
