= Phani Bora =

Indian politician

Phani Bora (21 August 1923 – 29 July 2004) was an Indian politician.

Bora became active in the struggle for Indian independence in the early 1930s. He joined the Assam Students Federation. In 1941 he set up the Nagaon district branch of the ASF. He took part in the 1942 Quit India movement. Later the same year he joined the Communist Party of India. In the following year he was included in the Assam Provincial Committee of the Communist Party. In 1945 he became general secretary of the All India Students' Federation.

In 1951 Biresh Mishra, branded for having promoted the 'left adventurist line', was removed from his post as secretary of the Assam Provincial Committee of the Communist Party. Bora was unanimously elected as the new secretary, at a clandestine meeting of the Assam Provincial Committee in Calcutta. Bora had opposed the B.T. Ranadive line. Bora continued to hold the post as Assam party secretary for 24 years. In 1951 he contested the Nowgong Raha seat for the Assam Legislative Assembly, being the sole Communist Party candidate in the fray (Nowgong Raha was a two-member constituency). Bora finished in third place, with 9,527 votes.

Bora was elected to the Central Committee of the Communist Party of India in 1953. When the Central Committee was replaced with a National Council at the 1958 extraordinary party conference in Amritsar, Bora was elected to the new body as well.

Bora contested the 1957 Assam Legislative Assembly election, again finishing in third place in the Nowgong (SC) constituency with 25,377 votes (26.79%). In 1959 Bora was elected to the Assam Legislative Assembly, in a by-election in the Nowgong constituency. He lost the Nowgong seat in the 1962 election, finishing in second place with 9,586 votes (27.02%). In the 1967 election he was able to recapture the Nowgong seat, with 13,370 votes (53.42%). He lost the Nowgong seat in the 1972 election, finishing in second place with 12,145 votes (39.18%).

In 1974 Bora was included in the organisational department of the Central Executive Committee of the Communist Party of India. He was put in-charge of organising the party units in North-East India. In the 1978 election, he finished in fourth place in Nowgong with 5,251 votes (13.02)%.

Phani Bora died on 28 July 2004. His body was cremated at Nabagraha crematorium. Assam Chief Minister Tarun Gogoi and Union Minister of State for Defence B.K. Handique condoled his death. The Assam Legislative Assembly observed two-minutes of silence in his honour.
