= Diplu Ranjan Sarmah =

Indian politician

Member of Assam Legislative Assembly
- Constituency: New Guwahati] (May 2026–present); Samagiri (2024–2026)

Personal details
- Party: Bharatiya Janata Party
- Profession: Politician

Diplu Ranjan Sarmah is an Indian politician from Assam. He has been a member of the Assam Legislative Assembly since 2024, representing the Samaguri constituency as a member of the Bharatiya Janata Party.

== See also ==
- List of chief ministers of Assam
- Assam Legislative Assembly
