= Kirip Chaliha =

Indian politician

Member of 14th Lok Sabha
- In office 2004–2009
- Succeeded by: Bijoya Chakravarty
- Constituency: Gauhati

Member of 10th Lok Sabha
- In office 1991–1996
- Preceded by: Dinesh Goswami
- Succeeded by: Prabin Chandra Sharma
- Constituency: Gauhati

Personal details
- Born: 1 November 1955 (age 70) Dibrugarh, Assam
- Party: INC
- Spouse: Romani Chaliha
- Children: 2 sons Arkasish Chaliha, Angshasish Chaliha
- Education: Gauhati University
- As of 25 September Source

Kirip Chaliha (born 1November 1955) was a member of the 14th Lok Sabha of India. He represented the Gauhati constituency of Assam and is a member of the Indian National Congress (INC) political party. He hails from Sivsagar, Assam.

He was also previously a member of the 10th Lok Sabha also having represented the Gauhati. He is a congress loyalist and true soldier of INC.
