= Asom Gana Parishad =

- Abbreviation: AGP
- Leader: Prafulla Kumar Mahanta
- President: Atul Bora
- Secretary: Ramendra Narayan Kalita
- Founder: Prafulla Kumar Mahanta; Bhrigu Kumar Phukan; Biraj Kumar Sarma
- Founded: 14 October 1985 (41 years ago)
- Headquarters: AGP Complex, Gopinath Bordoloi Road, Ambari, Guwahati - 781001
- Student wing: Tridip Bora
- Youth wing: Jitu Borgohain
- Women's wing: Manoshi S. Bhagowati
- Peasant's wing: Sunil Deka
- Ideology: Regionalism; Ethnic nationalism
- Political position: Centre-right to right-wing
- ECI status: State Party
- Alliance: NEDA (2016–2019, 2019–present); NDA (2016–2019, 2019–present)
- Seats in Rajya Sabha: 1 / 245
- Seats in Lok Sabha: 1 / 543
- Seats in Assam Legislative Assembly: 10 / 126

Election symbol
- Elephant

Website
- https://agpofficial.in

Asom Gana Parishad (AGP; lit. 'Assam People's Council') is a state political party based in the state of Assam, India. The AGP formed the government after the 1985 and 1996 legislative assembly elections. Party leader, Prafulla Kumar Mahanta, twice served as the Chief Minister of Assam, from 1985 to 1990 and again from 1996 to 2001.

The AGP was formed following the Assam Accord and the Golaghat Convention in 1985. The AGP split in 1991, with former Home Minister, Brighu Kumar Phukan, forming the Natun Asom Gana Parishad. The party reunited before the 1996 elections. The AGP split once again in 2005, with former Chief Minister, Prafulla Kumar Mahanta, forming the Asom Gana Parishad Pragatishel. The AGP reunited in October 2008 at Golaghat.

The AGP was a member of the National Democratic Alliance that won the 2016, 2021 and 2026 Assam legislative assembly elections. At the federal level, the AGP was a member of the National Front from 1989 to 1990 and the United Front from 1996 to 1998. Since 1998, the AGP has often joined and supported the National Democratic Alliance.

== History ==
The Assam Movement, also known as the Anti-Foreigners Agitation, was a movement, from 1979 to 1985, that demanded the Government of India detect, disenfranchise and deport foreign-born inhabitants without citizenship. Led by the All Assam Students Union (AASU), the movement defined a six-year period of sustained civil disobedience campaigns, political instability and ethnic violence. The movement ended in 1985 with the Assam Accord.

In 1985, the Assam Legislative Assembly was dissolved and the Congress government headed by Hiteswar Saikia, which came to power in 1983, was dismissed by the Prime Minister of India, Rajiv Gandhi. The Golaghat National Convention of Assam Movement activists, held in Golaghat on 13–14 October 1985, formally established the Asom Gana Parishad (AGP) to contest the 1985 elections. Prafulla Kumar Mahanta, the President of the AASU, was elected the President of the presidium of the AGP.

After the 1985 elections, the AGP formed a government with the support of the successful independent candidates affiliated with the Assam Movement. The AGP thereafter held 92 seats in the 126-member Assam legislative assembly. AGP affiliated independents won seven of the 14 Lok Sabha (Parliament) seats in the delayed 1984-85 general election in Assam. The AGP formed the government again after the 1996 elections.

Party leader, Prafulla Kumar Mahanta, served as the Chief Minister of Assam for two terms, first from 1985 to 1990 and again from 1996 to 2001. The Asom Gana Parishad was a part of the National Front government from December 1989 to November 1990. AGP Member of Parliament Dinesh Goswami was the Union Minister of Law and Justice in the V. P. Singh Ministry. The party also took part in the United Front governments headed by H. D. Deve Gowda and Inder Kumar Gujral from 1996 to 1998. Party leaders Birendra Prasad Baishya and Muhi Ram Saikia took office as Union Minister of Steel and Mines and the Union Minister of State for Human Resources Development respectively in the United Front governments.

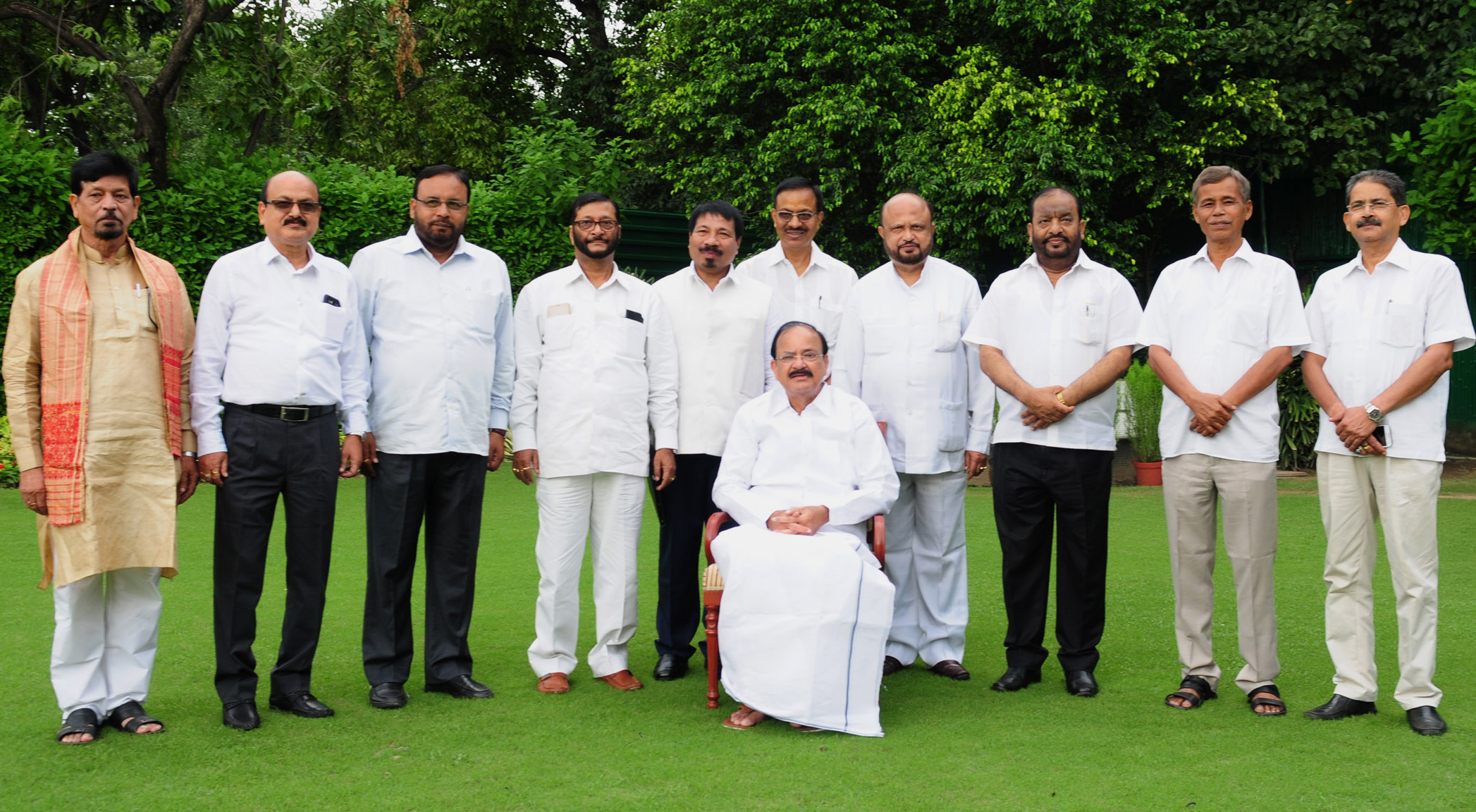
The Vice President of India, Venkaiah Naidu, with a delegation of Ministers and MLAs of the Asom Gana Parishad.

Since the late 1990s, the AGP has often joined and supported the National Democratic Alliance. There have been tactical alliances and seat-sharing arrangements in assembly and Lok Sabha elections. The Bharatiya Janata Party was the junior coalition member in the 2001 assembly elections, but the AGP accepted the role of junior coalition member in the 2016, 2021 and 2026 assembly elections. As a member of the National Democratic Alliance, the AGP is a constituent also of the North-East Democratic Alliance (NEDA).

In 2019, the AGP briefly withdrew from the National Democratic Alliance due to the unpopularity of the Citizenship Amendment Act with its voter base. AGP ministers resigned from the state government, including Atul Bora, Keshab Mahanta and Phani Bhusan Choudhury. Senior AGP leaders officially oppose the Citizenship Amendment Act and support the implementation of the Assam Accord, as of 2024. However, the AGP renewed its membership in the National Democratic Alliance before the 2019 Indian general election. The AGP faces factionalism over the Citizenship Amendment Act, with supporters and detractors amongst the party's legislators and voter base.

== Factionalism ==
The AGP in March 1991 underwent a split when party general secretary and former Assam Home Minister Bhrigu Kumar Phukan, former Union Law Minister and MP Dinesh Goswami, former state Education Minister Brindaban Goswami, Assam Legislative Assembly speaker Pulakesh Barua and others formed the Natun Asom Gana Parishad (natun means new in Assamese). This fraction came back to the party fold before the 1996 elections.

In 2000, former Assam PWD minister and senior party leader Atul Bora (Senior) moved away along with Pulakesh Barua and formed Trinamool Gana Parishad.

After the second AGP Government's reign under Prafulla Kumar Mahanta came to an end and Congress regained power, numerous allegations were raised against him related to the corruption during his tenure, government's involvement in secret killings, and Mahanta's overall inactive leadership. These led to his demotion from being President of the party and later he was expelled from the party on 3 July 2005 after being accused of anti-party activities. Mahanta then formed his own party, Asom Gana Parishad (Progressive).

In 2008, a process started to reconcile the differences among all the breakaway fractions and to bring back everybody under the mother party umbrella to strengthen the regional party movement in Assam. Finally, on 14 October 2008, all breakaway groups reconciled in one umbrella at the historic town Golaghat. Prafulla Mahanta merged his AGP(P) with it. Atul Bora and Pulakesh Barua merged their TGP with the AGP and farmer leader and former legislator of Patacharkuchi, Pabindra Deka too merged the Purbanchaliya Loka Parishad (PLP) with it.

In 2011, Sarbananda Sonowal resigned from all executive posts within AGP and joined the Bharatiya Janata Party, due to dissatisfaction with and amongst the senior leadership of the party who were trying to forge an alliance with a party that was against the scrapping of the controversial IMDT Act. "The AGP was born out of the illegal foreigners' issue after the six-year-long Assam agitation; 855 people laid down their lives in the agitation. However, the party has failed to honor the sacrifice of the martyrs by deviating from its principles. But I have no grievances against the dedicated grassroots-level workers. Since the AGP has failed to tackle the illegal migrants' problem, I've joined the BJP keeping in mind the interest of the people of Assam and the fact that I'll be able to highlight the problems and issues of the state at the national level," Sonowal, the former AGP general secretary, said.

On 8 February 2011, Sonowal joined Bharatiya Janata Party in the presence of the then BJP National President Nitin Gadkari and senior leaders like Varun Gandhi, Vijay Goel, Bijoya Chakravarty and state BJP president Ranjit Dutta. He was immediately appointed a member of the BJP National Executive and then later on State Spokesperson of the state BJP unit, prior to his current assignment to head the state as the new president.

Again on 3 July 2013, senior party leader Atul Bora once again left the party and joined BJP.

== Electoral performance ==
=== Assam Legislative Assembly ===
Election	Seats	Seats contested	Votes	Vote Percentage
1985	92 / 126	126 / 126	New	38.91%
1991	19 / 126	121 / 126	▼73	17.93%
1996	59 / 126	96 / 126	▲41	29.70%
2001	20 / 126	77 / 126	▼39	20.02%
2006	24 / 126	100 / 126	▲4	20.39%
2011	10 / 126	104 / 126	▼14	16.29%
2016	14 / 126	30 / 126	▲4	8.1%
2021	9 / 126	29 / 126	▼5	7.91%
2026	10 / 126	22 / 126	▲1	6.48%

=== Lok Sabha, Assam ===
Election	Seats	Seats contested	Votes
1985	7 / 14	10 / 14	2,628,291
1989	Election not held		
1991	1 / 14	14 / 14	1,489,898
1996	5 / 14	11 / 14	2,560,506
1998	0 / 14	10 / 14	1,064,977
1999	0 / 14	8 / 14	1,182,061
2004	2 / 14	12 / 14	2,069,600
2009	1 / 14	6 / 14	1,773,103
2014	0 / 14	12 / 14	577,730
2019	0 / 14	3 / 14	1,480,697
2024	1 / 14	2 / 14	1,298,707

== Leadership ==
List of presidents

No. (Note: A parenthetical number indicates that the incumbent has previously held office.)	Name	Portrait	Term	Constituency			
No.	Name	Portrait	Term	Constituency	1	Prafulla Kumar Mahanta	Nowgong
3.	Thaneswar Boro			Rangiya			
2.	Brindaban Goswami		September, 2001 – 21 September 2008	Tezpur			
4.	Chandra Mohan Patowary	Chandra Mohan Parowary in left corner with P. Radhakrishnan.	21 September 2008 – 14 May 2011	Dharmapur			
(1)	Prafulla Kumar Mahanta		14 May 2011 – 15 July 2014	Barhampur			
5.	Atul Bora		15 July- Incumbent	Bokakhat			

List of Working Presidents

No. (Note: A parenthetical number indicates that the incumbent has previously held office.)	Name	Portrait		
No.	Name	Portrait	1	Bhrigu Phukan
3.	Keshab Mahanta			

List of Chief Ministers

No. (Note: A parenthetical number indicates that the incumbent has previously held office.)	Name	Portrait	Ministries	Constituency	Term of office		
No.	Name	Portrait	Ministries	Constituency	From	To	Days in office
1	Prafulla Kumar Mahanta		First Mahanta ministry	Nowgong	24 December 1985	28 November 1990	4 years, 339 days
1	Prafulla Kumar Mahanta		Second Mahanta ministry	Barhampur	15 May 1996	17 May 2001	5 years, 2 days

List of Leaders of Opposition

No. (Note: A parenthetical number indicates that the incumbent has previously held office.)	Name	Portrait & Term			
No.	Name	Portrait & Term	1	Prafulla Kumar Mahanta	4 September 2010 - 14 July 2014
2.	Brindaban Goswami				
3	Chandra Mohan Patowary	5 September 2007 – 5 September 2010			

== Members in Rajya Sabha ==
Rajya Sabha members AGP
Name	Portrait	State	Appointment date	Retirement date
Birendra Prasad Baishya	B.P. Baishya in between Keshab Mahanta and Atul Bora	Assam		
Kumar Deepak Das	Kumar Deepak Das in the left corner.	Assam		
Parag Chaliha		Assam		
Joyasree Goswami Mahanta		Assam		
Bhadreswar Buragohain		Assam		
David Ledger		Assam		
Bijoya Chakravarty				
Arun Kumar Sarmah				
Nagen Saikia				

- Baishya
- Buragohain
- Chakravarty
- Chaliha
- Das
- Ledger
- Mahanta
- Saikia

== Members in Lok Sabha ==
Lok Sabha members from AGP
Name	Portrait	Term	Constituency	State
Parag Chaliha		1985-1989	Jorhat	Assam
Dinesh Goswami		1985-1989	Guwahati	Assam
Gakul Saikia		1985-1989	Lakhimpur	Assam
Muhi Ram Saikia		1984-1989, 1991-1996, 1996-1998	Nowgong	Assam
Prabin Chandra Sarma		1996-1998	Guwahati	Assam
Keshab Mahanta		1996-1998	Kaliabor	Assam
Arun Kumar Sarmah			Lakhimpur	Assam
Sarbananda Sonowal		2004-2009	Dibrugarh	Assam
Birendra Prasad Baishya	fourth from left side, in middle between Keshab Mahanta and Atul Bora.	1996-1998	Mangaldoi	Assam
Joseph Toppo		2009-2014	Tezpur	Assam
Ataur Rahman		1985-1989	Barpeta	Assam
Bhadreswar Tanti		1985-1989	Kaliabor	Assam
Saifuddin Ahmed		1985-1989	Mangaldoi	Assam
Phani Bhusan Choudhury		2024-incumbent	Barpeta	Assam

- Saikia
- Saikia
- Tanti
- Mahanta
- Sarmah
- Baishya
- Sonowal
- Toppo

== State ministers ==
=== Ministers under Sarbananda Sonowal ===
List of AGP Ministers in Sonowal ministry(5-December-2016-
Nos.	Portrait	Ministers	CM
Cabinet Minister			Sarbananda Sonowal
1.		Atul Bora	Sarbananda Sonowal
2.		Keshab Mahanta	Sarbananda Sonowal
3.		Phani Bhusan Choudhury	Sarbananda Sonowal

=== Ministers under Himanta Biswa Sarma ===
List of AGP Ministers in First Sarma ministry (2021–2026) and Second Sarma ministry (2026– )
Nos.	Portrait	Ministers	CM
Cabinet Minister			
1.		Atul Bora	
2.		Keshab Mahanta	

== See also ==
- Golaghat Convention
- Natun Asom Gana Parishad
- Assamese Language Movement
- Nellie Massacre
- National Register of Citizens for Assam.
- List of political parties in India
