= All Assam Students' Union =

Students' organisation in Assam, India

- Symbol of the Assam Movement
- Abbreviation: AASU
- Formation: 8 August 1967; 59 years ago
- Type: Student organization
- Headquarters: Gauhati University
- Region served: Assam
- President: Utpal Sarma
- Chief Advisor: Samujjal Bhattacharjya
- General Secretary: Samiron Phukan

All Assam Students' Union or AASU is an Assamese nationalist student's organization in Assam, India. It is best known for leading the six-year Assam Movement against Bengalis of both Indian and Bangladeshi origin living in Assam. The original leadership of the organisation, after the historic Assam Accord of 1985, became part of the newly formed Asom Gana Parishad which formed a state government in Assam.

== History ==
A student union, Asom Chattra Sanmilan was formed on 25 December 1916 under the leadership of Karmabir Chandranath Sarma and Rasaraj Lakshminath Bezbaroa, originally formed to promote Assamese literature, language and culture, but later raised socio-political and economic demands. Earlier it had held a special session in Gauhati and launched a strike and picketing campaign against the Cunningham Circular of 1930. In 1940, the Asom Chattra Sanmilan (Assam Students' Association) divided into the All Assam Student Federation and the All Assam Students' Congress. A decade later the two recombined as the All Assam Students' Association, which was later renamed All Assam Students' Union in January 1967. In August 1967, the Union "established itself as a formal organisation and adopted its Constitution".

== Assam agitation ==
AASU formed the All Assam Gana Sangram Parishad in August 1979 consisting of AASU, Assam Sahitya Sabha, Purbanchaliya Lok Parishad. The Jatiyatabadi Dal, Asom Yubak Samaj and Young Lawyers Forum also joined the Gana Parisha later on. AASU started observing massive satyagraha on the lines of India freedom struggle.

== Assam Accord ==
Finally the central government signed the historic Assam Accord in 1985 to resolve the matter. The agitation ended and AGP won the election to the state Legislative Assembly and its leader became the chief minister of the state.

Under the Assam Accord, a person who came to Assam from East Pakistan after 1951 and before 1971 was given citizenship. The Assam Accord stated in clause 6 that while giving citizenship to immigrants, constitutional protection will be given to the original citizens of Assam. The Illegal Migrants (Determination by Tribunal) Act, 1983 (IMDT Act) was enacted by the Parliament of India in 1983 . This Act was struck down by the Supreme Court of India in 2005.

The IMDT Act 1983 described the procedures to detect illegal immigrants (from Bangladesh) and expel them from Assam. It was applicable to the state of Assam only whereas in other states, detection of foreigners was done under The Foreigners Act, 1946.

== Citizenship Amendment Bill ==
The Lok Sabha on 9th Dec 2019 passed the bill for Citizenship (Amendment) 2019 with 311 votes in favour and 80 against. The Rajya Sabha on 11th Dec 2019 passed the Citizenship (Amendment) Bill, 2019, with 125 votes in favour and 99 against.

The students' union stated that it opposes the Citizenship (Amendment) Bill stating that it is unconstitutional.

Following the passage of the bill, AASU, along with several Nationalist organisations like KMSS, launched a mass protest against the bill.

Following the failure of the protest, AASU and Asom Jatiyatabadi Yuba Chatra Parishad (AJYCP) came together to launch a new regional political party, Assam Jatiya Parishad (AJP) in September 2020 to contest the 2021 Assam Legislative Assembly election. The primary reason of forming the AJP and contesting elections was securing the interests of the indigenous people of Assam.

== Office Holders ==
Serial no.	President	Tenure	Serial no.	General Secretary	Tenure
	Brindaban Goswami			Bhrigu Phukan	
	Prafulla Kumar Mahanta				
	Atul Bora				
	Sankar Prasad Roy				
	Bimal Bora				
	Sarbananda Sonowal	1992-1999		Lurinjyoti Gogoi	
	Dipankar Kumar Das			Sankar Jyoti Baruah	
	Utpal Sarma			Samiran Phukan	

== See also ==
- Asom Sena
- Assamese Language Movement
- Assam Movement
- Citizenship Amendment Act
- Northeast Students' Organization
- All Bodo Students' Union

== Official website ==
- Official Site
