= Prafulla Kumar Mahanta =

11th Chief Minister of Assam

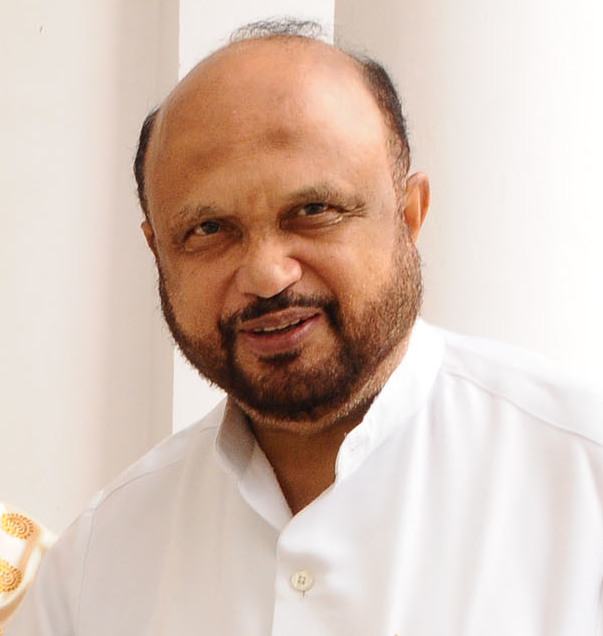
- Mahanta in 2017

11th Chief Minister of Assam
- In office 15 May 1996 – 17 May 2001
- Governor: Lokanath Misra; Srinivas Kumar Sinha
- Preceded by: Bhumidhar Barman
- Succeeded by: Tarun Gogoi
- In office 24 December 1985 – 28 November 1990
- Governor: Bhishma Narain Singh; Hari Dev Joshi; Anisetti Raghuvir; Devi Das Thakur
- Preceded by: Hiteswar Saikia
- Succeeded by: Hiteswar Saikia

Leader of the Opposition, Assam Legislative Assembly
- In office 4 September 2010 - 14 July 2014
- Chief Minister: Tarun Gogoi
- Preceded by: Chandra Mohan Patowary
- Succeeded by: vacant
- In office 1991 - 1996
- Chief Minister: Hiteswar Saikia

Member of Assam Legislative Assembly
- In office 22 June 1991 — 4 May 2021
- Preceded by: Girindra Kumar Baruah
- Succeeded by: Jitu Goswami
- Constituency: Barhampur
- In office 1985 - 1991
- Preceded by: Mukut Sharma
- Succeeded by: Mukut Sarma
- Constituency: Nowgong

Personal details
- Born: 23 December 1952 (age 73) Nagaon, Assam, India
- Party: Asom Gana Parishad
- Other political affiliations: National Democratic Alliance; North-East Democratic Alliance
- Spouse: Joyasree Goswami Mahanta
- Children: 3
- Parents: Deba Kanta Mahanta (father); Lakshmi Prova Mahanta (mother)

Prafulla Kumar Mahanta (born 23 December 1952) is an Indian politician who was the leader of the Assam Movement, and the 11th Chief Minister of Assam from 1985 to 1990 and again from 1996 to 2001 and the co-founder and former President of the Asom Gana Parishad (AGP), a major political party in the Indian state of Assam. He represented the Barhampur constituency in the Assam Legislative Assembly from 1991 to 2021 and Nowgong constituency from 1985 to 1991. He also served as the Leader of the Opposition in the Assam Legislative Assembly from 1991 to 1996 and again from 2010 to 2014. He became the chief minister in the state when the AGP came to power in 1985, becoming the youngest chief minister of an Indian state. He is also a former president of the All Assam Students Union, an organization that spearheaded the Assam Movement from 1979 to 1985.In August 2005, his membership in the Asom Gana Parishad (AGP) was terminated. So, he floated a new political party, Asom Gana Parishad (Progressive) on 15 September 2005.

== Early life and education ==
Prafulla Kumar Mahanta was born on the 23 December 1952 to Late Lakshmi Prova Mahanta and Late Deba Kanta Mahanta(1923-2022), at Village-Uluoni, Ruparayan Satra Kaliabor, Nagaon. He earned a bachelor's degree in law from Gauhati University.

== Political career ==
During his time as a student, he became active in politics, and in 1979 he was named the president of the All Assam Students' Union (AASU), an influential organization in the state. That year the AASU embarked on a popular agitation against illegal immigrants from Bangladesh that lasted until 1985. The movement, spearheaded by Mahanta, made him from being the leader of a student organization to becoming an influential politician. He was a major factor in the formation of the AGP in October 1985 and was elected the party's first president.

Mahanta was first elected to the Assembly in 1985 for Nowgong. Mahanta next was elected to the Assembly in 1991 for Barhampur. He defeated the Indian National Congress candidate, Ramesh Chandra Phukan, by 17333 votes. He continued to represent Barhampur in 1996, 2001 2006, 2011 and 2016.

On 4 September 2010 he was again unanimously elected as the Leader of Opposition in the Assam Legislative Assembly.

On 21 October 2013, representatives from eleven political parties of the North-east region met to form a new political front, the North-East Regional Political Front (NERPF), to protect the interests of the region's people. Mahanta was appointed the front's chief adviser.

On 14 July 2014 he resigned as president of Asom Gana Parishad after its failure to get any seat in the 2014 Lok Sabha elections.

He did not run in the 2021 Assam Legislative Assembly Election after differences with his party. However, the cause might also have been his health and whether or not he could campaign.

=== Chief Ministership ===
AGP candidates secured a notable victory in December 1985, Mahanta who was one of those people, became the Chief Minister, he became the youngest person in the country to hold such a high office. His first administration, however, was beset by allegations of corruption and problems of escalating violence linked to the United Liberation Front of Assam (a militant separatist group in the state). In 1990 the authorities in New Delhi dismissed the AGP government and took direct rule of the state. A split in the party in 1991 and voter dissatisfaction with its performance in its first administration led to a poor performance for the party in the 1991 assembly elections.

Following an AGP resurgence in the 1996 state assembly elections, Mahanta became the chief minister for a second time. That tenure became highly controversial, especially after the revelation of a counterinsurgency strategy that allegedly was under the direction of Mahanta. In June 1997 the ULFA staged an attack on Mahanta, after which the police coerced ULFA cadres who had surrendered to the authorities to kill family members of active insurgents. An official commission that later was to investigate the killings and it concluded in 2007 that Mahanta was directly responsible for the policy. Also during his second administration, Mahanta was alleged to have been involved in a corruption scandal involving fraudulent letters of credit and avoided prosecution only through the intervention of the governor of Assam. Investigation of the matter was reopened in 2010. The 2001 elections were terrible for the AGP as they only won 20 seats. On top of that, it was alleged that Mahanta had had an extramarital affair, he subsequently was ousted as president.

Despite the allegations of secret killings he organized against families of ULFA members, documented in the report by the Saikia Commission to the Assam Assembly, Mahanta was missed from political leadership in the state. He was reinducted into the AGP after the AGP (Progressive) was dissolved during the presidency of Chandra Mohan Patowary, and regained a prominent position in the party.

In a 2010 interview on NDTV's Walk the Talk with Shekhar Gupta, editor-in-chief of The Indian Express, Mahanta said:

"For the sake of the integrity and security of India, we are ready to take any blame. If the insurgent groups attack our forces, then they (the security forces) must have the right to respond. However, the charge against me on extra judicial killings of the ULFA sympathisers is to malign my image."

In the same interview, he said that unknown agencies of the Congress Party had conspired in massacres during the Assam Movement in the early eighties.

== Personal life ==
Mahanta married Jayashree Goswami Mahanta on the 29 April 1988. His wife was a writer and served as a Rajya Sabha MP. Together they had 2 sons and 1 daughter. His younger son, Shuvam Kashyap, was hurt in a road accident in 2016.

He was admitted to hospital in September 2020. He was also admitted to Guwahati hospital on 16 January 2021 after he complained about chest pain and high blood pressure. Prime Minister Narendra Modi met his wife and his son and wished Mahanta a speedy recovery.

== See also ==
- AGP
- Assam Agitation
- ULFA
