= Assam Accord =

1985 agreement between the Indian government and the Assam Movement

Assam Accord, 1985
- Type: Peace
- Context: Assam Movement
- Signed: 15 August 1985; 39 years ago
- Location: New Delhi, India
- Original signatories: Prafulla Kumar Mahanta and others; (India) R. D. Pradhan
- Parties: AASU and others; Government of India; Government of Assam
- Language: English

The Assam Accord agreed to protect Assamese cultural, economic and political rights. It was signed after six years of Assam Movement.

The Assam Accord was a Memorandum of Settlement (MoS) signed between representatives of the Government of India and the leaders of the Assam Movement. It was signed in the presence of the then-Prime Minister Rajiv Gandhi in New Delhi on 15 August 1985. The Citizenship Act was amended for the first time the following year, in 1986. It followed a six-year agitation that started in 1979. Led by the All Assam Students’ Union (AASU), the protestors demanded the identification and deportation of all illegal foreigners – predominantly Bangladeshi immigrants. They feared that past and continuing large scale migration was overwhelming the native population, impacting their political rights, culture, language and land rights. The Assam Movement caused the estimated death of over 855 people. The movement ended with the signing of the Assam Accord.

The leaders of the Assam Movement agreed to accept all migrants who had entered into Assam prior to 1 January 1966. The Government of India acknowledged the political, social, cultural and economic concerns of the Assamese people and agreed to revise the electoral database based on that date. Further, the government agreed to identify and deport all refugees and migrants after March 25 1971. In 1971, millions of citizens of Bangladesh – then called East Pakistan – fled the abuses of a civil war and associated genocide between East Pakistan and West Pakistan triggering a mass influx of refugees into Assam, West Bengal, Tripura, various other nearby states of India as well as Myanmar.

According to the Assam Accord, the Government of India agreed to secure the international border against future infiltration by the "erection of physical barriers like walls, barbed wire fencing and other obstacles at appropriate places" and deploying a patrol by security forces on land and river routes all along the international Bangladesh-India border. To aid this effort, the Government also agreed to build a road near the border for the patrol and quicker deployment of Indian security forces, as well as maintain a mandatory birth and death list of citizens. All open police charges against the participants and the leaders of the Assam Movement, prior to and on the date of signing the Accord, were also withdrawn and closed. The families of those who died during the Assam Movement were given monetary compensation. The Government also agreed to open an oil refinery, reopen paper mills and establish educational institutions in the state.

The accord brought an end to the Assam Movement and paved the way for the leaders of the agitation to form a political party and form a government in the state of Assam soon after. Though the accord brought an end to the agitation, some of the key clauses are yet to be implemented, which kept some of the issues festering. According to Sanjib Baruah – a professor of Political Studies, the task of identifying foreigners became politically difficult, affected vote banks, and attracted accusations of religious or ethnic discrimination. Hiteswar Saikia, a chief minister of Assam in early 1990s and senior Congress party leader, for example gave conflicting statements in his speeches. In the front of some crowds, he denied there were any foreigners; before other crowds, he said there were hundreds of thousands of illegal foreigners in Assam that needed to be deported. In 1997, the state government completed a study and marked numerous names in its voter list with "d" meaning "disputed citizenship", with plans to block them from voting. Critics complained of disenfranchisement. The High Court of the state ascertained that the "d" is based on suspicion, not documentary evidence. All residents – citizens and foreigners – were allowed to vote in subsequent Assam elections. The supporters of the Assam Movement stated that the government had failed to implement the Assam Accord.

== Signatories ==
Representatives of Assam Movement

- Prafulla Kumar Mahanta, President, All Assam Students Union
- Bhrigu Kumar Phukan, General Secretary, All Assam Students Union
- Biraj Kumar Sarma, General Secretary, All Assam Gana Sangram Parishad

Representatives of Governments of India and Assam

- R. D. Pradhan, Home Secretary, Government of India
- P P Trivedi, Chief Secretary, Government of Assam

In the presence of

- Rajiv Gandhi, Prime Minister of India

== Bibliography ==
- ""Assam Accord"" (PDF). Archived from the original (PDF) on 25 December 2021.
