= Second Rajiv Gandhi ministry =

Ministers in Government of India headed by Prime Minister Rajiv Gandhi (1984 - 1989)

Rajiv Gandhi Ministry
- 13th ministry of the Republic of India

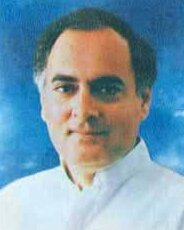
- Portrait of Rajiv Gandhi
- Date formed: 31 December 1984
- Date dissolved: 2 December 1989

People and organisations
- Head of state: Zail Singh (until 25 July 1987); R. Venkataraman (from 25 July 1987)
- Head of government: Rajiv Gandhi
- Member party: Indian National Congress (I) (Congress alliance)
- Status in legislature: Majority
- Opposition party: None
- Opposition leader: None

History
- Election: 1984
- Outgoing election: 1989
- Legislature terms: 4 years, 11 months and 2 days
- Predecessor: First Rajiv Gandhi ministry
- Successor: V. P. Singh ministry

The Second Rajiv Gandhi ministry was the 11th union council of ministers of India which was formed on 31 December 1984 after the 1984 general election which resulted in the formation of a majority government by the Indian National Congress party under the leadership of Prime Minister Rajiv Gandhi.

Rajiv Gandhi's cabinet included 7 Agriculturists, 15 Lawyers, 4 Journalists and 3 former Princely state rulers.

The ministry also included two ministers from Northeast India.

== Council of Ministers ==
=== Cabinet Ministers ===
Portfolio	Minister	Took office	Left office	Party	Remarks
Prime Minister; Minister of Personnel, Public Grievances and Pensions; Minister of Science and Technology; Department of Atomic Energy; Department of Electronics; Department of Ocean Development; Department of Space; And also in-charge of all other important portfolios and policy issues not allocated to any Minister.	Rajiv Gandhi	31 December 1984	2 December 1989	INC(I)	
Minister of Home Affairs	Shankarrao Chavan	31 December 1984	11 March 1986	INC(I)	
Minister of Home Affairs	P. V. Narasimha Rao	14 March 1986	12 May 1986	INC(I)	
Minister of Home Affairs	Buta Singh	12 May 1986	2 December 1989	INC(I)	
Minister of Defence	P. V. Narasimha Rao	31 December 1984	29 September 1985	INC(I)	
Minister of Defence	Rajiv Gandhi	29 September 1985	24 January 1987	INC(I)	Prime Minister was responsible.
Minister of Defence	V. P. Singh	24 January 1987	12 April 1987	INC(I)	
Minister of Defence	K. C. Pant	12 April 1987	2 December 1989	INC(I)	
Minister of External Affairs	Rajiv Gandhi	31 December 1984	25 September 1985	INC(I)	Prime Minister was responsible.
Minister of External Affairs	Bali Ram Bhagat	25 September 1985	12 May 1986	INC(I)	
Minister of External Affairs	P. Shiv Shankar	12 May 1986	22 October 1986	INC(I)	
Minister of External Affairs	N. D. Tiwari	22 October 1986	25 July 1987	INC(I)	
Minister of External Affairs	Rajiv Gandhi	25 July 1987	25 June 1988	INC(I)	Prime Minister was responsible.
Minister of External Affairs	P. V. Narasimha Rao	25 June 1988	2 December 1989	INC(I)	
Minister of Finance	V. P. Singh	31 December 1984	24 January 1987	INC(I)	
Minister of Finance	Rajiv Gandhi	24 January 1987	25 July 1987	INC(I)	Prime Minister was responsible.
Minister of Finance	N. D. Tiwari	25 July 1987	25 June 1988	INC(I)	
Minister of Finance	Shankarrao Chavan	25 June 1988	2 December 1989	INC(I)	
Minister of Planning	P. V. Narasimha Rao	31 December 1984	14 January 1985	INC(I)	
Minister of Planning	Rajiv Gandhi	14 January 1985	25 July 1987	INC(I)	Prime Minister was responsible.
Minister of Planning	P. Shiv Shankar	25 July 1987	14 February 1988	INC(I)	Merged with Ministry of Programme Implementation to form Ministry of Planning and Programme; Implementation.
Minister of Programme Implementation	A. B. A. Ghani Khan; Choudhury	25 September 1985	4 May 1987	INC(I)	
Minister of Programme Implementation	Rajiv Gandhi	4 May 1987	25 July 1987	INC(I)	Prime Minister was responsible
Minister of Programme Implementation	P. Shiv Shankar	25 July 1987	14 February 1988	INC(I)	Merged with Ministry of Planning to form Ministry of Planning and Programme; Implementation.
Minister of Planning and Programme Implementation	P. Shiv Shankar	14 February 1988	25 June 1988	INC(I)	
Minister of Planning and Programme Implementation	Madhavsinh Solanki	25 June 1988	2 December 1989	INC(I)	
Minister of Commerce and Supply	Rajiv Gandhi	31 December 1984	14 January 1985	INC(I)	Prime Minister was responsible.
Minister of Commerce and Supply	V. P. Singh	14 January 1985	30 March 1985	INC(I)	Bifurcated into Ministry of Commerce and Ministry of Supply and Textiles.
Minister of Commerce	V. P. Singh	30 March 1985	25 September 1985	INC(I)	
Minister of Commerce	Khurshed Alam Khan	25 September 1985	15 November 1985	INC(I)	Minister of State (I/C) was responsible.
Minister of Commerce	Arjun Singh	15 November 1985	20 January 1986	INC(I)	
Minister of Commerce	P. Shiv Shankar	20 January 1986	25 July 1987	INC(I)	
Minister of Commerce	N. D. Tiwari	25 July 1987	25 June 1988	INC(I)	
Minister of Commerce	Dinesh Singh	25 June 1988	2 December 1989	INC(I)	
Minister of Supply and Textiles	Chandrashekhar Singh	30 March 1985	25 September 1985	INC(I)	Minister of State (I/C) was responsible. Renamed as Textiles.
Minister of Textiles	Khurshed Alam Khan	15 September 1985	22 October 1986	INC(I)	Minister of State (I/C) was responsible.
Minister of Textiles	Ram Niwas Mirdha	22 October 1986	15 February 1988	INC(I)	Minister of State (I/C) was responsible.
Minister of Textiles	Ram Niwas Mirdha	15 February 1988	2 September 1989	INC(I)	
Minister of Industry and Company Affairs	Rajiv Gandhi	31 December 1984	14 January 1985	INC(I)	Prime Minister was responsible.
Minister of Industry and Company Affairs	Veerendra Patil	14 January 1985	25 September 1985	INC(I)	Renamed as Industry.
Minister of Industry	N. D. Tiwari	25 September 1985	22 October 1986	INC(I)	
Minister of Industry	Jalagam Vengala Rao	22 October 1986	2 December 1989	INC(I)	
Minister of Chemicals and Fertilizers	Veerendra Patil	31 December 1984	25 September 1985	INC(I)	Merged into Ministry of Industry.
Minister of Food and Civil Supplies	Rao Birender Singh	31 December 1984	25 September 1985	INC(I)	
Minister of Food and Civil Supplies	Kamakhya Prasad Singh Deo	25 September 1985	27 January 1986	INC(I)	Minister of State (I/C) was responsible.
Minister of Food and Civil Supplies	P. Shiv Shankar	27 January 1986	12 May 1986	INC(I)	
Minister of Food and Civil Supplies	H. K. L. Bhagat	12 May 1986	14 February 1988	INC(I)	
Minister of Food and Civil Supplies	Sukh Ram	14 February 1988	2 December 1989	INC(I)	Minister of State (I/C) was responsible.
Minister of Agriculture and Rural Development	Buta Singh	31 December 1984	25 September 1985	INC(I)	Renamed as Agriculture.
Minister of Agriculture	Buta Singh	25 September 1985	12 May 1986	INC(I)	
Minister of Agriculture	Gurdial Singh Dhillon	12 May 1986	14 February 1988	INC(I)	
Minister of Agriculture	Bhajan Lal	14 February 1988	2 December 1989	INC(I)	
Minister of Irrigation and Power	B. Shankaranand	31 December 1984	25 September 1985	INC(I)	Bifurcated into Ministry of Water Resources and Ministry of Energy.
Minister of Water Resources	B. Shankaranand	25 September 1985	22 August 1987	INC(I)	
Minister of Water Resources	Rajiv Gandhi	22 August 1987	10 November 1987	INC(I)	Prime Minister was responsible.
Minister of Water Resources	Ram Niwas Mirdha	10 November 1987	14 February 1988	INC(I)	Minister of State (I/C) was responsible.
Minister of Water Resources	Dinesh Singh	14 February 1988	25 June 1988	INC(I)	
Minister of Water Resources	B. Shankaranand	25 June 1988	4 July 1989	INC	
Minister of Water Resources	M. M. Jacob	4 July 1989	2 December 1989	INC(I)	Minister of State (I/C) was responsible.
Minister of Energy	Vasant Sathe	25 September 1985	3 September 1988	INC(I)	
Minister of Energy	Makhan Lal Fotedar	3 September 1988	19 September 1988	INC(I)	Additional charge during leave of Vasant Sathe.
Minister of Energy	Vasant Sathe	19 September 1988	2 December 1989	INC(I)	
Minister of Works and Housing	Abdul Ghafoor	31 December 1984	25 September 1985	INC(I)	Renamed as Urban Development.
Minister of Urban Development	Abdul Ghafoor	25 September 1985	22 October 1986	INC(I)	Minister of State (I/C) was responsible.
Minister of Urban Development	Mohsina Kidwai	22 October 1986	2 December 1989	INC(I)	
Minister of Labour	T. Anjaiah	31 December 1984	20 January 1986	INC(I)	Minister of State (I/C) was responsible.
Minister of Labour	P. A. Sangma	20 September 1986	6 February 1988	INC(I)	Minister of State (I/C) was responsible.
Minister of Labour	Makhan Lal Fotedar	6 February 1988	14 February 1988	INC(I)	
Minister of Labour	Jagdish Tytler	14 February 1988	25 June 1988	INC(I)	Minister of State (I/C) was responsible.
Minister of Labour	Bindeshwari Dubey	25 June 1988	2 December 1989	INC(I)	
Minister of Parliamentary Affairs	H. K. L. Bhagat	31 December 1984	2 December 1989	INC(I)	
Minister of Law and Justice	Ashoke Kumar Sen	31 December 1984	31 March 1987	INC(I)	
Minister of Law and Justice	P. Shiv Shankar	31 March 1987	14 February 1988	INC(I)	
Minister of Law and Justice	Bindeshwari Dubey	14 February 1988	25 June 1988	INC(I)	
Minister of Law and Justice	B. Shankaranand	25 June 1988	2 December 1989	INC(I)	
Minister of Health and Family Welfare	Ashoke Kumar Sen	31 December 1984	24 June 1986	INC(I)	
Minister of Health and Family Welfare	P. V. Narasimha Rao	24 June 1986	14 February 1988	INC(I)	
Minister of Health and Family Welfare	Motilal Vora	14 February 1988	24 January 1989	INC(I)	
Minister of Health and Family Welfare	Ram Niwas Mirdha	24 January 1989	4 July 1989	INC(I)	
Minister of Health and Family Welfare	Rafique Alam	4 July 1989	2 December 1989	INC(I)	Minister of State (I/C) was responsible.
Minister of Tourism and Civil Aviation	Rajiv Gandhi	31 December 1984	14 January 1985	INC(I)	Prime Minister was responsible. Bifurcated into Ministry of Tourism and Department of Civil Aviation.
Minister of Tourism	H. K. L. Bhagat	25 September 1985	12 May 1986	INC(I)	
Minister of Tourism	Mufti Mohammad Sayeed	12 May 1986	15 July 1987	INC(I)	
Minister of Tourism	Rajiv Gandhi	15 July 1987	28 July 1987	INC(I)	Prime Minister was responsible.
Minister of Tourism	Jagdish Tytler	28 July 1987	14 February 1988	INC(I)	Minister of State (I/C) was responsible.
Minister of Tourism	Mohsina Kidwai	14 February 1988	25 June 1988	INC(I)	Merged with Ministry of Civil Aviation to form Ministry of Civil Aviation and Tourism.
Minister of Railways	Bansi Lal	31 December 1984	25 September 1985	INC(I)	Merged with Ministry of Shipping and Transport and Department of Civil Aviation to form Ministry of Transport.
Minister of Shipping and Transport	Ziaur Rahman Ansari	31 December 1984	25 September 1985	INC(I)	Minister of State (I/C) was responsible. Merged with Ministry of Railways and Department of Civil; Aviation to form Ministry of Transport.
Minister of Transport	Bansi Lal	25 September 1985	4 June 1986	INC(I)	
Minister of Transport	Rajiv Gandhi	4 June 1986	24 June 1986	INC	Prime Minister was responsible.
Minister of Transport	Mohsina Kidwai	24 June 1986	22 October 1986	INC(I)	Bifurcated into Ministry of Surface Transport, Ministry of Railways and Ministry of Civil Aviation.
Minister of Civil Aviation	Jagdish Tytler	22 October 1986	14 February 1988	INC	Minister of State (I/C) was responsible.
Minister of Civil Aviation	Motilal Vora	14 February 1988	25 June 1988	INC(I)	Merged with Ministry of Tourism to form Ministry of Civil Aviation and Tourism.
Minister of Education	K. C. Pant	31 December 1984	25 September 1985	INC(I)	Renamed as Human Resource Development.
Minister of Human Resource Development	P. V. Narasimha Rao	25 September 1985	25 June 1988	INC(I)	
Minister of Human Resource Development	P. Shiv Shankar	25 June 1988	2 September 1989	INC(I)	
Minister of Environment and Forests	Rajiv Gandhi	31 December 1984	22 October 1986	INC(I)	Prime Minister was responsible.
Minister of Environment and Forests	Bhajan Lal	22 October 1986	14 February 1988	INC(I)	
Minister of Environment and Forests	Ziaur Rahman Ansari	14 February 1988	25 June 1988	INC(I)	Minister of State (I/C) was responsible.
Minister of Environment and Forests	Ziaur Rahman Ansari	25 June 1988	2 December 1989	INC(I)	
Minister of Petroleum	Nawal Kishore Sharma	31 December 1984	25 September 1985	INC(I)	Minister of State (I/C) was responsible. Renamed as Petroleum and Natural Gas.
Minister of Petroleum and Natural Gas	Nawal Kishore Sharma	25 September 1985	20 October 1986	INC(I)	Minister of State (I/C) was responsible.
Minister of Petroleum and Natural Gas	Chandrashekhar Singh	20 October 1986	9 July 1986	INC(I)	Minister of State (I/C) was responsible.
Minister of Petroleum and Natural Gas	N. D. Tiwari	9 July 1986	22 October 1986	INC(I)	
Minister of Petroleum and Natural Gas	Brahm Dutt	22 October 1986	2 December 1989	INC(I)	Minister of State (I/C) was responsible.
Minister of Steel, Mines and Coal	Vasant Sathe	31 December 1984	25 September 1985	INC(I)	Bifurcated into Ministry of Steel and Mines, and Department of Coal (Ministry of Energy).
Minister of Steel and Mines	K. C. Pant	25 September 1985	12 April 1987	INC(I)	
Minister of Steel and Mines	Vasant Sathe	12 April 1987	25 July 1987	INC	
Minister of Steel and Mines	Makhan Lal Fotedar	25 July 1987	2 December 1989	INC(I)	
Minister of Information and Broadcasting	V. N. Gadgil	31 December 1984	22 October 1986	INC(I)	Minister of State (I/C) was responsible.
Minister of Information and Broadcasting	Ajit Kumar Panja	22 October 1986	14 February 1988	INC(I)	Minister of State (I/C) was responsible.
Minister of Information and Broadcasting	H. K. L. Bhagat	14 February 1988	2 December 1989	INC(I)	
Minister of Communications	Ram Niwas Mirdha	31 December 1984	22 October 1986	INC(I)	Minister of State (I/C) was responsible.
Minister of Communications	Arjun Singh	22 October 1986	14 February 1988	INC(I)	
Minister of Communications	Vasant Sathe	14 February 1988	25 June 1988	INC(I)	
Minister of Communications	Vir Bahadur Singh	25 June 1988	30 May 1989	INC(I)	
Minister of Communications	Rajiv Gandhi	31 May 1989	4 July 1989	INC(I)	
Minister of Communications	Giridhar Gamang	4 July 1989	2 December 1989	INC(I)	Minister of State (I/C) was responsible.

=== Ministers of State (Independent Charge) ===
Portfolio	Minister	Took office	Left office	Party	Remarks
Minister of State (Independent Charge) of Women and Social Welfare	Maragatham Chandrasekar	31 December 1984	25 September 1985	INC(I)	Renamed as Welfare.
Minister of State (Independent Charge) of Welfare	Rajendra Kumari Bajpai	25 September 1985	2 December 1989	INC(I)	
Minister of State (Independent Charge) of Railways	Madhavrao Scindia	22 October 1986	2 December 1989	INC(I)	
Minister of State (Independent Charge) of Surface Transport	Rajesh Pilot	22 October 1986	2 December 1989	INC(I)	
Minister of State (Independent Charge) of Civil Aviation and Tourism	Shivraj Patil	14 February 1988	2 December 1989	INC(I)	

=== Ministers of State ===
Portfolio	Minister	Took office	Left office	Party	Remarks
Minister of State in the Ministry of Home Affairs	Ram Dulari Sinha	31 December 1984	25 September 1985	INC(I)	
Minister of State in the Ministry of Home Affairs	Arif Mohammad Khan	12 August 1985	25 September 1985	INC(I)	
Minister of State in the Ministry of Home Affairs	P. A. Sangma (States)	25 September 1985	20 January 1986	INC(I)	
Minister of State in the Ministry of Home Affairs	Arun Nehru (Internal Security)	25 September 1985	22 October 1986	INC(I)	
Minister of State in the Ministry of Home Affairs	Ram Niwas Mirdha	14 March 1986	14 June 1986	INC(I)	
Minister of State in the Ministry of Home Affairs	Ghulam Nabi Azad (States)	12 May 1986	22 October 1986	INC(I)	
Minister of State in the Ministry of Home Affairs	P. Chidambaram	24 June 1986	2 December 1989	INC(I)	
Minister of State in the Ministry of Home Affairs	Chintamani Panigrahi	22 October 1986	25 June 1988	INC(I)	
Minister of State in the Ministry of Home Affairs	Santosh Mohan Dev (Internal Security)	25 June 1988	2 December 1989	INC(I)	
Minister of State in the Ministry of External Affairs	Khurshed Alam Khan	31 December 1984	25 September 1985	INC(I)	
Minister of State in the Ministry of External Affairs	K. R. Narayanan	25 September 1985	22 October 1986	INC(I)	
Minister of State in the Ministry of External Affairs	Eduardo Faleiro	12 May 1986	14 February 1988	INC(I)	
Minister of State in the Ministry of External Affairs	K. Natwar Singh	22 October 1986	2 December 1989	INC(I)	
Minister of State in the Ministry of External Affairs	K. K. Tewary	25 June 1988	22 April 1989	INC(I)	
Minister of State in the Ministry of Finance	Janardhana Poojary	31 December 1984	14 February 1988	INC(I)	
Minister of State in the Ministry of Finance	B. K. Gadhvi (Expenditure)	12 May 1986	2 December 1989	INC(I)	
Minister of State in the Ministry of Finance	Brahm Dutt	24 January 1987	25 July 1987	INC(I)	
Minister of State in the Ministry of Finance	Ajit Kumar Panja (Revenue)	14 February 1988	2 December 1989	INC(I)	
Minister of State in the Ministry of Finance	Eduardo Faleiro (Economic Affairs)	14 February 1988	2 December 1989	INC(I)	
Minister of State in the Departments of Science and Technology, Space, Atomic Energy, Electronics, and Ocean Development	Shivraj Patil	31 December 1984	22 October 1986	INC(I)	
Minister of State in the Departments of Science and Technology, Space, Atomic Energy, Electronics, and Ocean Development	K. R. Narayan	22 October 1986	2 December 1989	INC	
Minister of State in the Ministry of Planning	K. R. Narayanan	31 December 1984	25 September 1985	INC(I)	
Minister of State in the Ministry of Planning	Ajit Kumar Panja	25 September 1985	22 October 1986	INC(I)	
Minister of State in the Ministry of Planning	Sukh Ram	22 October 1986	14 February 1988	INC(I)	
Minister of State in the Ministry of Planning and Programme Implementation	Biren Sing Engti	14 February 1988	2 December 1989	INC(I)	
Minister of State in the Ministry of Defence	Sukh Ram (Defence Production and Supplies)	25 September 1985	22 October 1986	INC(I)	
Minister of State in the Ministry of Defence	Arun Singh (Defence Research and Development Organisation)	25 September 1985	18 July 1987	INC(I)	
Minister of State in the Ministry of Defence	Shivraj Patil (Defence Production)	22 October 1986	25 June 1988	INC(I)	
Minister of State in the Ministry of Defence	Santosh Mohan Dev	14 February 1988	25 June 1988	INC(I)	
Minister of State in the Ministry of Defence	Chintamani Panigrahi (Defence Production and Supplies)	25 June 1988	4 July 1989	INC(I)	
Minister of State in the Ministry of Defence	Dumar Lal Baitha (Defence Production and Supplies)	4 July 1989	2 December 1989	INC(I)	
Minister of State in the Ministry of Health and Family Welfare	Yogendra Makwana (Health)	31 December 1984	25 September 1985	INC(I)	
Minister of State in the Ministry of Health and Family Welfare	Saroj Khaparde	12 May 1986	4 July 1989	INC(I)	
Minister of State in the Ministry of Commerce and Supply	P. A. Sangma	1 January 1985	25 September 1985	INC(I)	
Minister of State in the Ministry of Commerce	Brahm Dutt	12 May 1986	22 October 1986	INC(I)	
Minister of State in the Ministry of Commerce	Priya Ranjan Dasmunsi	22 October 1986	2 December 1989	INC(I)	
Minister of State in the Ministry of Industry and Company Affairs	Arif Mohammad Khan	31 December 1984	25 September 1985	INC(I)	Renamed as Industry.
Minister of State in the Ministry of Industry	Rajkumar Jaichandra Singh (Chemicals and Petrochemicals)	25 September 1985	18 February 1988	INC(I)	
Minister of State in the Ministry of Industry	M. Arunachalam (Industrial Development)	25 September 1985	2 December 1989	INC(I)	
Minister of State in the Ministry of Industry	K. K. Tewary (Public Enterprises)	12 May 1986	23 July 1987	INC(I)	
Minister of State in the Ministry of Industry	P. Namgyal (Chemicals and Petrochemicals)	4 July 1989	2 September 1989	INC(I)	
Minister of State in the Ministry of Agriculture and Rural Development	Chandulal Chandrakar	1 January 1985	25 September 1985	INC(I)	Renamed as Agriculture.
Minister of State in the Ministry of Agriculture	Yogendra Makwana (Agriculture and Cooperation)	25 September 1985	14 February 1988	INC(I)	
Minister of State in the Ministry of Agriculture	K. Natwar Singh (Fertilizers)	25 September 1985	22 October 1986	INC(I)	
Minister of State in the Ministry of Agriculture	Ramanand Yadav (Rural Development)	12 May 1986	14 February 1988	INC(I)	
Minister of State in the Ministry of Agriculture	R. Prabhu (Fertilizers)	22 October 1986	2 September 1989	INC(I)	
Minister of State in the Ministry of Agriculture	Janardhana Poojary (Rural Development)	14 February 1988	2 December 1989	INC(I)	
Minister of State in the Ministry of Agriculture	Hari Krishna Shastri (Agriculture Research and Education)	14 February 1988	2 December 1989	INC(I)	
Minister of State in the Ministry of Agriculture	Shyamlal Yadav (Agriculture and Cooperation)	14 February 1988	2 December 1989	INC(I)	
Minister of State in the Ministry of Energy	Arun Nehru (Power)	31 December 1984	25 September 1985	INC(I)	
Minister of State in the Ministry of Energy	Arif Mohammad Khan (Power)	25 September 1985	26 February 1986	INC(I)	
Minister of State in the Ministry of Energy	Sushila Rohatgi (Power)	12 May 1986	9 May 1988	INC(I)	
Minister of State in the Ministry of Energy	C. K. Jaffer Sharief (Coal)	14 February 1988	2 December 1989	INC(I)	
Minister of State in the Ministry of Steel, Mines and Coal	K. Natwar Singh (Steel)	31 December 1984	25 September 1985	INC(I)	Bifurcated into Ministry of Steel and Mines, and Department of Coal (Ministry of Energy).
Minister of State in the Ministry of Steel and Mines	Ram Dulari Sinha (Mines)	25 September 1985	14 February 1988	INC(I)	
Minister of State in the Ministry of Steel and Mines	Ramanand Yadav (Mines)	14 February 1988	12 April 1988	INC(I)	
Minister of State in the Ministry of Steel and Mines	Yogendra Makwana	14 February 1988	2 October 1988	INC(I)	
Minister of State in the Ministry of Steel and Mines	Mahaveer Prasad (Mines)	4 July 1989	2 December 1989	INC(I)	
Minister of State in the Ministry of Railways	Madhavrao Scindia	31 December 1984	25 September 1985	INC(I)	Merged to form Ministry of Transport.
Minister of State in the Ministry of Transport	Madhavrao Scindia (Railways)	25 September 1985	22 October 1986	INC(I)	
Minister of State in the Ministry of Transport	Rajesh Pilot (Surface Transport)	25 September 1985	22 October 1986	INC(I)	
Minister of State in the Ministry of Transport	Jagdish Tytler (Civil Aviation)	25 September 1985	22 October 1986	INC(I)	
Minister of State in the Ministry of Parliamentary Affairs	Margaret Alva	31 December 1984	25 September 1985	INC(I)	
Minister of State in the Ministry of Parliamentary Affairs	Ghulam Nabi Azad	31 December 1984	12 May 1986	INC(I)	
Minister of State in the Ministry of Parliamentary Affairs	Sitaram Kesri	12 May 1986	2 December 1989	INC(I)	
Minister of State in the Ministry of Parliamentary Affairs	Sheila Dikshit	12 May 1986	2 September 1989	INC(I)	
Minister of State in the Ministry of Parliamentary Affairs	M. M. Jacob	22 October 1986	2 December 1989	INC(I)	
Minister of State in the Ministry of Parliamentary Affairs	P. Namgyal	4 July 1989	2 December 1989	INC(I)	
Minister of State in the Ministry of Parliamentary Affairs	Radhakishan Malviya	4 July 1989	2 December 1989	INC(I)	
Minister of State in the Ministry of Law and Justice	H. R. Bhardwaj	31 December 1984	2 December 1989	INC(I)	
Minister of State in the Ministry of Personnel and Training, Public; Grievances and Pensions and Administrative Reforms	Kamakhya Prasad Singh Deo (Personnel and Administrative; Reforms)	31 December 1984	15 March 1985	INC(I)	
Minister of State in the Ministry of Personnel and Training, Public; Grievances and Pensions and Administrative Reforms	Kamakhya Prasad Singh Deo	15 March 1985	25 September 1985	INC(I)	
Minister of State in the Ministry of Personnel and Training, Public; Grievances and Pensions and Administrative Reforms	Shivraj Patil	25 September 1985	4 October 1985	INC(I)	
Minister of State in the Ministry of Personnel, Public Grievances and Pensions	P. Chidambaram	20 January 1986	2 December 1989	INC(I)	
Minister of State in the Department of Culture	Kamakhya Prasad Singh Deo	31 December 1984	25 September 1985	INC(I)	Merged into Ministry of Human; Resource Development.
Minister of State in the Department of Youth Affairs and Sports	Rajkumar Jaichandra Singh	31 December 1984	25 September 1985	INC(I)	Merged into Ministry of Human; Resource Development.
Minister of State in the Ministry of Human Resource Development	Sushila Rohatgi (Education and Culture)	12 May 1986	14 February 1988	INC(I)	
Minister of State in the Ministry of Human Resource Development	Margaret Alva (Women and Child Development, Youth Affairs and Sports)	14 February 1988	4 July 1989	INC(I)	
Minister of State in the Ministry of Human Resource Development	Laliteshwar Prasad Shahi (Education and Culture)	14 February 1988	4 July 1989	INC(I)	
Minister of State in the Ministry of Human Resource Development	Laliteshwar Prasad Shahi (Education)	4 July 1989	2 December 1989	INC(I)	
Minister of State in the Ministry of Human Resource Development	Krishna Sahi (Culture)	4 July 1989	2 December 1989	INC(I)	
Minister of State in the Ministry of Tourism and Civil Aviation	Ashok Gehlot	31 December 1984	24 August 1985	INC(I)	Bifurcated into Ministry of Tourism and Ministry of Civil Aviation.
Minister of State in the Ministry of Tourism	Ghulam Nabi Azad	25 September 1985	12 May 1986	INC(I)	
Minister of State in the Ministry of Tourism	Santosh Mohan Dev	12 May 1986	14 February 1988	INC(I)	
Minister of State in the Ministry of Tourism	Giridhar Gamang	14 February 1988	25 June 1988	INC(I)	
Minister of State in the Ministry of Environment and Forests	Vir Sen	31 December 1984	25 September 1985	INC(I)	
Minister of State in the Ministry of Environment and Forests	Ziaur Rahman Ansari	25 September 1985	14 February 1988	INC(I)	
Minister of State in the Ministry of Environment and Forests	Sumati Oraon	4 July 1989	2 December 1989	INC(I)	
Minister of State in the Ministry of Urban Development	Dalbir Singh	25 September 1985	2 December 1989	INC(I)	
Minister of State in the Ministry of Food and Civil Supplies	Ajit Kumar Panja	19 February 1986	22 October 1986	INC(I)	
Minister of State in the Ministry of Food and Civil Supplies	Ghulam Nabi Azad	22 October 1986	7 September 1987	INC(I)	
Minister of State in the Ministry of Petroleum and Natural Gas	Sushila Rohatgi	24 June 1986	22 October 1986	INC(I)	
Minister of State in the Ministry of Water Resources	Krishna Sahi	14 February 1988	4 July 1989	INC(I)	
Minister of State in the Prime Minister's Office	Sheila Dikshit	25 June 1988	2 December 1989	INC(I)	
Minister of State in the Ministry of Information and Broadcasting	S. Krishna Kumar	25 June 1988	2 December 1989	INC(I)	
Minister of State in the Ministry of Information and Broadcasting	K. K. Tewary	22 April 1989	2 December 1989	INC(I)	
Minister of State in the Ministry of Textiles	Rafique Alam	25 June 1988	4 July 1989	INC(I)	
Minister of State in the Ministry of Textiles	Saroj Khaparde	4 July 1989	2 December 1989	INC(I)	
Minister of State in the Ministry of Communications	Santosh Mohan Dev	22 October 1986	14 February 1988	INC(I)	
Minister of State in the Ministry of Communications	Giridhar Gamang	25 June 1988	4 July 1989	INC(I)	
Minister of State in the Ministry of Labour	Radhakishan Malviya	4 July 1989	2 September 1989	INC(I)	

=== Deputy Ministers ===
Portfolio	Minister	Took office	Left office	Party
Deputy Minister in the Ministry of Commerce	P. Chidambaram	25 September 1985	27 September 1985	INC(I)
Deputy Minister in the Ministry of Commerce	P. Chidambaram (Textiles)	27 September 1985	4 October 1985	INC(I)
Deputy Minister in the Ministry of Welfare	Giridhar Gamang	25 September 1985	15 February 1988	INC(I)
Deputy Minister in the Ministry of Welfare	Sumati Oraon	15 February 1988	4 July 1989	INC(I)
Deputy Minister in the Ministry of Health and Family Welfare	S. Krishna Kumar	25 September 1985	22 October 1986	INC(I)
Deputy Minister in the Ministry of Personnel, Administrative Reforms, Training, Public Grievances and Pensions	P. Chidambaram	4 October 1985	20 January 1986	INC
Deputy Minister in the Ministry of Personnel, Administrative Reforms, Training, Public Grievances and Pensions	Biren Sing Engti (Personnel and Training)	12 May 1986	4 June 1986	INC(I)
Deputy Minister in the Ministry of Personnel, Administrative Reforms, Training, Public Grievances and Pensions	Biren Sing Engti	4 June 1986	14 February 1988	INC(I)
Deputy Minister in the Ministry of Textiles	S. Krishna Kumar	22 October 1986	14 February 1988	INC(I)
Deputy Minister in the Ministry of Information and Broadcasting	S. Krishna Kumar	14 February 1988	25 June 1988	INC(I)
Deputy Minister in the Ministry of Railways	Mahaveer Prasad	14 February 1988	4 July 1989	INC(I)
Deputy Minister in the Ministry of Food and Civil Supplies	Dumar Lal Baitha	14 February 1988	4 July 1989	INC(I)
Deputy Minister in the Ministry of Petroleum and Natural Gas	Rafique Alam	14 February 1988	25 June 1988	INC(I)
Deputy Minister in the Ministry of Labour	Radhakishan Malviya	14 February 1988	4 July 1989	INC(I)
Deputy Minister in the Ministry of Surface Transport	P. Namgyal	15 February 1988	4 July 1989	INC(I)
Deputy Minister in the Ministry of Parliamentary Affairs	Radhakishan Malviya	25 June 1988	4 July 1989	INC(I)
Deputy Minister in the Ministry of Parliamentary Affairs	P. Namgyal	25 June 1988	4 July 1989	INC

=== Parliamentary Secretaries ===
Portfolio	Minister	Took office	Left office	Party
Parliamentary Secretary to the Prime Minister	Oscar Fernandes	1 January 1985	25 September 1985	INC(I)
Parliamentary Secretary to the Prime Minister	Ahmed Patel	1 January 1985	25 September 1985	INC(I)
Parliamentary Secretary to the Prime Minister	Arun Singh	1 January 1985	25 September 1985	INC(I)
