= Minister of Education (India) =

Member of the Union Cabinet of India holding Education portfolio

- Śikṣā Mantrī
- Logo of the Union Ministry of Education

- Flag of India

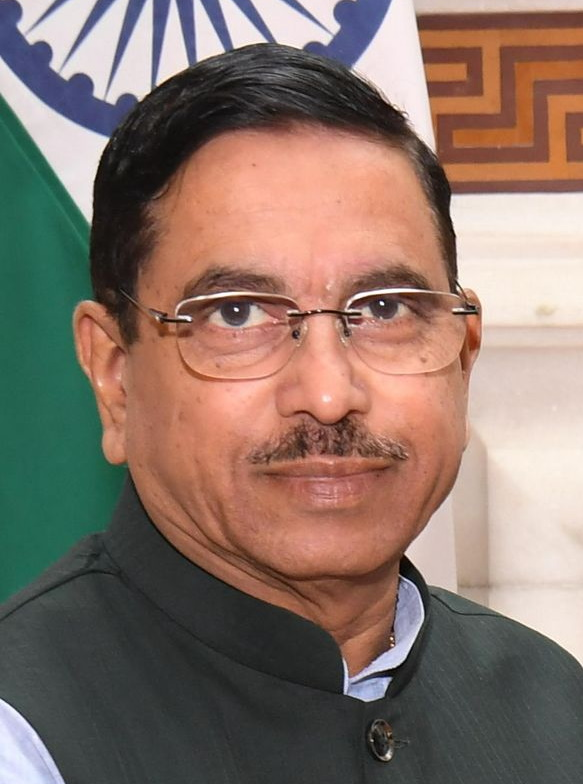
- Incumbent; Pralhad Joshi (additional charge) since 26 July 2026
- Ministry of Education
- Style: The Honourable
- Type: Member of the Executive branch of the Union Government
- Member of: Union Cabinet of India; Parliament of India
- Reports to: President of India; Prime Minister of India; Parliament of India
- Seat: Kartavya Bhavan-2, New Delhi
- Nominator: Prime Minister of India
- Appointer: President of India; on the advice of the Prime Minister
- Term length: 5 years (renewable)
- Formation: 15 August 1947
- First holder: Maulana Abul Kalam Azad

The Minister of Education, formerly the Minister of Human Resources Development (1985–2020), is the head of the Ministry of Education and a member of the Union Cabinet and one of the portfolios of the union cabinet in the Government of India.

== Cabinet ministers ==
- Note: MoS I/C – Minister of State (Independent Charge)

#	Portrait	Minister (Birth-Death) Constituency	Term of office			Political party	Ministry	Prime Minister
#	Portrait	Minister (Birth-Death) Constituency	From	To	Period	Political party	Ministry	Prime Minister
Minister of Education
1		Maulana Abul Kalam Azad (1888–1958); MP for United Provinces (1947–1952); MP for Rampur (1952–1957)	15 August 1947	17 April 1957	9 years, 245 days	Indian National Congress	Nehru I	Jawaharlal Nehru
1		Maulana Abul Kalam Azad (1888–1958); MP for United Provinces (1947–1952); MP for Rampur (1952–1957)	15 August 1947	17 April 1957	9 years, 245 days	Indian National Congress	Nehru II	Jawaharlal Nehru
Minister of Education and Scientific Research
(1)		Maulana Abul Kalam Azad (1888–1958); MP for Gurgaon	17 April 1957	22 February 1958 [†]	280 days	Indian National Congress	Nehru III	Jawaharlal Nehru
2		K. L. Shrimali (1909–2000); Rajya Sabha MP for Rajasthan (MoS)	22 February 1958	10 April 1962	4 years, 47 days	Indian National Congress	Nehru III	Jawaharlal Nehru
Minister of Education
(2)		K. L. Shrimali (1909–2000); Rajya Sabha MP for Rajasthan	10 April 1962	31 August 1963	1 year, 143 days	Indian National Congress	Nehru IV	Jawaharlal Nehru
3		Humayun Kabir (1906–1969); MP for Basirhat	31 August 1963	21 November 1963	82 days	Indian National Congress	Nehru IV	Jawaharlal Nehru
4		M. C. Chagla (1900–1981); Rajya Sabha MP for Maharashtra	21 November 1963	13 November 1966	2 years, 357 days	Indian National Congress	Nehru IV	Jawaharlal Nehru
4		M. C. Chagla (1900–1981); Rajya Sabha MP for Maharashtra	21 November 1963	13 November 1966	2 years, 357 days	Indian National Congress	Nanda I	Gulzarilal Nanda (Acting)
4		M. C. Chagla (1900–1981); Rajya Sabha MP for Maharashtra	21 November 1963	13 November 1966	2 years, 357 days	Indian National Congress	Shastri	Lal Bahadur Shastri
4		M. C. Chagla (1900–1981); Rajya Sabha MP for Maharashtra	21 November 1963	13 November 1966	2 years, 357 days	Indian National Congress	Nanda II	Gulzarilal Nanda (Acting)
4		M. C. Chagla (1900–1981); Rajya Sabha MP for Maharashtra	21 November 1963	13 November 1966	2 years, 357 days	Indian National Congress	Indira I	Indira Gandhi
5		Fakhruddin Ali Ahmed (1905–1977); Rajya Sabha MP for Assam	14 November 1966	13 March 1967	119 days	Indian National Congress	Indira I	Indira Gandhi
6		Triguna Sen (1905–1998); Rajya Sabha MP for Tripura	16 March 1967	14 February 1969	1 year, 335 days	Indian National Congress	Indira II	Indira Gandhi
Minister of Education and Youth Services
7		V. K. R. V. Rao (1908–1991); MP for Bellary	14 February 1969	18 March 1971	2 years, 32 days	Indian National Congress (R)	Indira II	Indira Gandhi
Minister of Education and Culture
8		Siddhartha Shankar Ray (1920–2010); MP for Raiganj	18 March 1971	20 March 1972	1 year, 2 days	Indian National Congress (R)	Indira III	Indira Gandhi
9		Saiyid Nurul Hasan (1921–1993); Rajya Sabha MP for Uttar Pradesh (MoS, I/C)	24 March 1972	24 March 1977	5 years, 0 days	Indian National Congress (R)	Indira III	Indira Gandhi
10		Pratap Chandra Chunder (1919–2008); MP for Calcutta North East	24 March 1977	28 July 1979	2 years, 126 days	Janata Party	Desai	Morarji Desai
11		Karan Singh (born 1931); MP for Udhampur	28 July 1979	14 January 1980	170 days	Indian National Congress (Urs)	Charan Singh	Charan Singh
12		B. Shankaranand (1925–2009); MP for Chikkodi	14 January 1980	17 October 1980	277 days	Indian National Congress (I)	Indira IV	Indira Gandhi
13		Shankarrao Chavan (1920–2004); MP for Nanded	17 October 1980	8 August 1981	295 days	Indian National Congress (I)	Indira IV	Indira Gandhi
14		Sheila Kaul (1915–2015); MP for Raebareli (MoS, I/C)	8 August 1981	31 December 1984	3 years, 145 days	Indian National Congress (I)	Indira IV	Indira Gandhi
14		Sheila Kaul (1915–2015); MP for Raebareli (MoS, I/C)	8 August 1981	31 December 1984	3 years, 145 days	Indian National Congress (I)	Rajiv I	Rajiv Gandhi
Minister of Education
15		K. C. Pant (1931–2012); MP for New Delhi	31 December 1984	25 September 1985	268 days	Indian National Congress (I)	Rajiv II	Rajiv Gandhi
Minister of Human Resource Development
16		P. V. Narasimha Rao (1921–2004); MP for Ramtek	25 September 1985	25 June 1988	2 years, 274 days	Indian National Congress (I)	Rajiv II	Rajiv Gandhi
17		P. Shiv Shankar (1929–2017); Rajya Sabha MP for Gujarat	25 June 1988	2 December 1989	1 year, 160 days	Indian National Congress (I)	Rajiv II	Rajiv Gandhi
18		V. P. Singh (1931–2008); MP for Fatehpur (Prime Minister)	2 December 1989	10 November 1990	343 days	Janata Dal	V. P. Singh	V. P. Singh
19		Raj Mangal Pande (1920–1993); MP for Deoria	21 November 1990	21 June 1991	212 days	Samajwadi Janata Party (Rashtriya)	Chandra Shekhar	Chandra Shekhar
20		Arjun Singh (1930–2011); MP for Satna	23 June 1991	24 December 1994	3 years, 184 days	Indian National Congress (I)	Rao	P. V. Narasimha Rao
21		P. V. Narasimha Rao (1921–2004); MP for Nandyal (Prime Minister)	24 December 1994	9 February 1995	47 days	Indian National Congress (I)	Rao	P. V. Narasimha Rao
22		Madhavrao Scindia (1945–2001); MP for Gwalior	9 February 1995	17 January 1996	342 days	Indian National Congress (I)	Rao	P. V. Narasimha Rao
(21)		P. V. Narasimha Rao (1921–2004); MP for Nandyal (Prime Minister)	17 January 1996	16 May 1996	120 days	Indian National Congress (I)	Rao	P. V. Narasimha Rao
23		Atal Bihari Vajpayee (1924–2018); MP for Lucknow (Prime Minister)	16 May 1996	1 June 1996	16 days	Bharatiya Janata Party	Vajpayee I	Atal Bihari Vajpayee
24		S. R. Bommai (1927–2007); Rajya Sabha MP for Odisha	5 June 1996	19 March 1998	1 year, 286 days	Janata Dal	Deve Gowda	H. D. Deve Gowda
24		S. R. Bommai (1927–2007); Rajya Sabha MP for Odisha	5 June 1996	19 March 1998	1 year, 286 days	Janata Dal	Gujral	Inder Kumar Gujral
25		Murli Manohar Joshi (born 1934); MP for Allahabad	19 March 1998	22 May 2004	6 years, 64 days	Bharatiya Janata Party	Vajpayee II	Atal Bihari Vajpayee
25		Murli Manohar Joshi (born 1934); MP for Allahabad	19 March 1998	22 May 2004	6 years, 64 days	Bharatiya Janata Party	Vajpayee III	Atal Bihari Vajpayee
(19)		Arjun Singh (1930–2011); Rajya Sabha MP for Madhya Pradesh	23 May 2004	22 May 2009	4 years, 364 days	Indian National Congress	Manmohan I	Manmohan Singh
26		Kapil Sibal (born 1948); MP for Chandni Chowk	28 May 2009	28 October 2012	3 years, 153 days	Indian National Congress	Manmohan II	Manmohan Singh
27		M. M. Pallam Raju (born 1962); MP for Kakinada	28 October 2012	26 May 2014	1 year, 210 days	Indian National Congress	Manmohan II	Manmohan Singh
28		Smriti Irani (born 1976); Rajya Sabha MP for Gujarat	26 May 2014	5 July 2016	2 years, 39 days	Bharatiya Janata Party	Modi I	Narendra Modi
29		Prakash Javadekar (born 1951); Rajya Sabha MP for Madhya Pradesh, till 2018; Rajya Sabha MP for Maharashtra, from 2018	5 July 2016	30 May 2019	2 years, 329 days	Bharatiya Janata Party	Modi I	Narendra Modi
Minister of Education (from 29 July 2020)
30		Ramesh Pokhriyal (born 1959); MP for Haridwar	30 May 2019	7 July 2021	2 years, 38 days	Bharatiya Janata Party	Modi II	Narendra Modi
31		Dharmendra Pradhan (born 1969); MP for Sambalpur	7 July 2021	25 July 2026	5 years, 18 days	Bharatiya Janata Party	Modi II	Narendra Modi
31		Dharmendra Pradhan (born 1969); MP for Sambalpur	7 July 2021	25 July 2026	5 years, 18 days	Bharatiya Janata Party	Modi III	Narendra Modi
32		Pralhad Joshi (additional charge) (born 1962); MP for Dharwad	26 July 2026	Incumbent	109 days	Bharatiya Janata Party	Modi III	Narendra Modi

== Ministers of state ==
#	Portrait	Minister (Birth-Death) Constituency	Term of office			Political party	Ministry	Prime Minister
#	Portrait	Minister (Birth-Death) Constituency	From	To	Period	Political party	Ministry	Prime Minister
Minister of State for Education and Scientific Research
1		K. L. Shrimali (1909–2000); Rajya Sabha MP for Rajasthan (MoS)	17 April 1957	22 February 1958	280 days	Indian National Congress	Nehru III	Jawaharlal Nehru
Minister of State for Education
2		Ramchandra Martand Hajarnavis (1908–1976); MP for Bhandara (Minister of Cultural Affairs)	13 June 1964	29 October 1965	1 year, 138 days	Indian National Congress	Shastri	Lal Bahadur Shastri
3		Sher Singh Kadyan (1917–2009); MP for Rohtak	13 March 1967	14 February 1969	1 year, 338 days	Indian National Congress	Indira II	Indira Gandhi
4		Bhagwat Jha Azad (1922–2011); MP for Bhagalpur	13 March 1967	14 February 1969	1 year, 338 days	Indian National Congress	Indira II	Indira Gandhi
Minister of State for Education and Youth Services
5		Bhakt Darshan (1912–1991); MP for Garhwal	18 February 1969	18 March 1971	2 years, 28 days	Indian National Congress (R)	Indira II	Indira Gandhi
Minister of State for Education and Culture
6		Saiyid Nurul Hasan (1921–1993); Rajya Sabha MP for Uttar Pradesh	4 October 1971	24 March 1972	172 days	Indian National Congress (R)	Indira III	Indira Gandhi
7		Dhanna Singh Gulshan; MP for Bathinda	14 August 1977	28 July 1979	1 year, 348 days	Janata Party	Desai	Morarji Desai
8		Renuka Devi Barkataki (1932–2017); MP for Gauhati	16 August 1977	28 July 1979	1 year, 346 days	Janata Party	Desai	Morarji Desai
9		Rashida Haque Choudhury; MP for Silchar	30 July 1979	14 January 1980	168 days	Janata Party (Secular)	Charan Singh	Charan Singh
10		Sheila Kaul (1915–2015); MP for Raebareli	24 November 1980	8 August 1981	257 days	Indian National Congress (I)	Indira IV	Indira Gandhi
Minister of State for Human Resource Development
11		Margaret Alva (born 1942); Rajya Sabha MP for Karnataka (Women and Child Development, Youth Affairs and Sports)	25 September 1985	2 December 1989	4 years, 68 days	Indian National Congress (I)	Rajiv II	Rajiv Gandhi
12		Sushila Rohatgi (1921–2011); Rajya Sabha MP for Uttar Pradesh (Education and Culture)	25 September 1985	12 May 1986	229 days	Indian National Congress (I)	Rajiv II	Rajiv Gandhi
13		Krishna Sahi (born 1931); MP for Begusarai (Education and Culture, until 1988; Culture, from 1988)	12 May 1986	2 December 1989	3 years, 204 days	Indian National Congress (I)	Rajiv II	Rajiv Gandhi
14		Laliteshwar Prasad Shahi (1920–2018); MP for Muzaffarpur (Education and Culture, until 1989; Education, from 1989)	14 February 1988	2 December 1989	1 year, 291 days	Indian National Congress (I)	Rajiv II	Rajiv Gandhi
15		M. G. K. Menon (1928–2016); Rajya Sabha MP for Rajasthan (Education)	20 January 1990	23 April 1990	93 days	Janata Dal	V. P. Singh	V. P. Singh
16		Chimanbhai Mehta (1925–2010); Rajya Sabha MP for Gujarat	23 April 1990	10 November 1990	201 days	Janata Dal	V. P. Singh	V. P. Singh
17		Bhagey Gobardhan (1934–1993); MP for Mayurbhanj	21 November 1990	20 February 1991	91 days	Samajwadi Janata Party (Rashtriya)	Chandra Shekhar	Chandra Shekhar
18		Mamata Banerjee (born 1955); MP for Calcutta South (Youth Affairs and Sports; Women and Child Development)	21 June 1991	17 January 1993	1 year, 210 days	Indian National Congress (I)	Rao	P. V. Narasimha Rao
19		Mukul Wasnik (born 1959); MP for Buldhana (Youth Affairs and Sports)	18 January 1993	16 May 1996	3 years, 119 days	Indian National Congress (I)	Rao	P. V. Narasimha Rao
20		Basavarajeshwari (1921–2008); MP for Bellary	19 January 1993	15 September 1995	2 years, 239 days	Indian National Congress (I)	Rao	P. V. Narasimha Rao
21		Selja Kumari (born 1962); MP for Sirsa (Education and Culture)	15 September 1995	16 May 1996	244 days	Indian National Congress (I)	Rao	P. V. Narasimha Rao
22		Krupasindhu Bhoi (born 1942); MP for Sambalpur (Education)	15 September 1995	16 May 1996	244 days	Indian National Congress (I)	Rao	P. V. Narasimha Rao
23		Vimla Verma (1929–2019); MP for Seoni (Women and Child Development)	15 September 1995	16 May 1996	244 days	Indian National Congress (I)	Rao	P. V. Narasimha Rao
24		Kanti Singh (born 1957); MP for Bikramganj	1 June 1996	29 June 1996	28 days	Janata Dal	Deve Gowda	H. D. Deve Gowda
25		Muhi Ram Saikia (1923–2007); MP for Nowgong (Education)	29 June 1996	21 April 1997	296 days	Asom Gana Parishad	Deve Gowda	H. D. Deve Gowda
26		R. Dhanuskodi Athithan (born 1953); MP for Tiruchendur (Youth Affairs and Sports)	29 June 1996	21 April 1997	296 days	Tamil Maanila Congress (Moopanar)	Deve Gowda	H. D. Deve Gowda
(25)		Muhi Ram Saikia (1923–2007); MP for Nowgong (Education)	21 April 1997	19 March 1998	332 days	Asom Gana Parishad	Gujral	Inder Kumar Gujral
(26)		R. Dhanuskodi Athithan (born 1953); MP for Tiruchendur (Youth Affairs and Sports)	1 May 1997	19 March 1998	322 days	Tamil Maanila Congress (Moopanar)	Gujral	Inder Kumar Gujral
27		Uma Bharti (born 1959); MP for Khajuraho	19 March 1998	13 October 1999	1 year, 208 days	Bharatiya Janata Party	Vajpayee II	Atal Bihari Vajpayee
28		Sumitra Mahajan (born 1943); MP for Indore	13 October 1999	1 July 2002	2 years, 261 days	Bharatiya Janata Party	Vajpayee III	Atal Bihari Vajpayee
29		Jaisingrao Gaikwad Patil (born 1949); MP for Beed	13 October 1999	27 May 2000	227 days	Bharatiya Janata Party	Vajpayee III	Atal Bihari Vajpayee
30		Syed Shahnawaz Hussain (born 1968); MP for Kishanganj	30 September 2000	8 February 2001	131 days	Bharatiya Janata Party	Vajpayee III	Atal Bihari Vajpayee
31		Rita Verma (born 1953); MP for Dhanbad	1 September 2001	29 January 2003	1 year, 150 days	Bharatiya Janata Party	Vajpayee III	Atal Bihari Vajpayee
32		Jaskaur Meena (born 1947); MP for Dausa	29 January 2003	22 May 2004	1 year, 114 days	Bharatiya Janata Party	Vajpayee III	Atal Bihari Vajpayee
33		Ashok Kumar Pradhan (born 1953); MP for Khurja	29 January 2003	24 May 2003	115 days	Bharatiya Janata Party	Vajpayee III	Atal Bihari Vajpayee
34		Vallabhbhai Kathiria (born 1954); MP for Rajkot	30 January 2003	9 January 2004	344 days	Bharatiya Janata Party	Vajpayee III	Atal Bihari Vajpayee
35		Sanjay Paswan (born 1962); MP for Nawada	24 May 2003	22 May 2004	364 days	Bharatiya Janata Party	Vajpayee III	Atal Bihari Vajpayee
36		Mohammad Ali Ashraf Fatmi (born 1956); MP for Darbhanga	23 May 2004	22 May 2009	4 years, 364 days	Rashtriya Janata Dal	Manmohan I	Manmohan Singh
(24)		Kanti Singh (born 1957); MP for Arrah	23 May 2004	29 January 2006	1 year, 251 days	Rashtriya Janata Dal	Manmohan I	Manmohan Singh
37		Daggubati Purandeswari (born 1959); MP for Bapatla (till 2009); MP for Visakhapatnam (from 2009)	29 January 2006	22 May 2009	3 years, 113 days	Indian National Congress	Manmohan I	Manmohan Singh
37		Daggubati Purandeswari (born 1959); MP for Bapatla (till 2009); MP for Visakhapatnam (from 2009)	28 May 2009	28 October 2012	3 years, 153 days	Indian National Congress	Manmohan II	Manmohan Singh
38		E. Ahamed (1938–2017); MP for Malappuram	12 July 2011	28 October 2012	1 year, 108 days	Indian Union Muslim League	Manmohan II	Manmohan Singh
39		Jitin Prasada (born 1973); MP for Dhaurahra	28 October 2012	26 May 2014	1 year, 210 days	Indian National Congress	Manmohan II	Manmohan Singh
40		Shashi Tharoor (born 1956); MP for Thiruvananthapuram	28 October 2012	26 May 2014	1 year, 210 days	Indian National Congress	Manmohan II	Manmohan Singh
41		Upendra Kushwaha (born 1960); MP for Karakat	9 November 2014	11 December 2018	4 years, 32 days	Rashtriya Lok Samta Party	Modi I	Narendra Modi
42		Ram Shankar Katheria (born 1964); MP for Agra	9 November 2014	5 July 2016	1 year, 239 days	Bharatiya Janata Party	Modi I	Narendra Modi
43		Mahendra Nath Pandey (born 1957); MP for Chandauli	5 July 2016	3 September 2017	1 year, 60 days	Bharatiya Janata Party	Modi I	Narendra Modi
44		Satya Pal Singh (born 1955); MP for Baghpat	3 September 2017	30 May 2019	1 year, 269 days	Bharatiya Janata Party	Modi I	Narendra Modi
Minister of State for Education (from 29 July 2020)
45		Sanjay Shamrao Dhotre (born 1959); MP for Akola	30 May 2019	7 July 2021	2 years, 38 days	Bharatiya Janata Party	Modi II	Narendra Modi
46		Annpurna Devi (born 1970); MP for Kodarma	7 July 2021	9 June 2024	2 years, 338 days	Bharatiya Janata Party	Modi II	Narendra Modi
47		Subhas Sarkar (born 1953); MP for Bankura	7 July 2021	9 June 2024	2 years, 338 days	Bharatiya Janata Party	Modi II	Narendra Modi
48		Rajkumar Ranjan Singh (born 1952); MP for Inner Manipur	7 July 2021	9 June 2024	2 years, 338 days	Bharatiya Janata Party	Modi II	Narendra Modi
49		Sukanta Majumdar (born 1979); MP for Balurghat	10 June 2024	Incumbent	2 years, 154 days	Bharatiya Janata Party	Modi III	Narendra Modi
50		Jayant Chaudhary (born 1978); Rajya Sabha MP for Uttar Pradesh	10 June 2024	Incumbent	2 years, 154 days	Rashtriya Lok Dal	Modi III	Narendra Modi
