= Batadroba Assembly constituency =

Constituency of the Assam legislative assembly in India

Coordinates: 26.41°N 92.55°E

Batadroba
- Former constituency No. 84 for the Assam Legislative Assembly

Constituency details
- Country: India
- Region: Northeast India
- State: Assam
- District: Nagaon
- Lok Sabha constituency: Kaliabor
- Established: 1978
- Abolished: 2023
- Reservation: None

Batadroba Assembly constituency was one of the 126 assembly constituencies of Assam, a north east state of India. It no longer exists after the Delimitation. Batadroba was also part of Kaliabor Lok Sabha constituency.

This constituency was abolished in 2023.

== Town Details ==
- Country: India.
- State: Assam.
- District: Nagaon district.
- Lok Sabha Constituency: Kaliabor Lok Sabha/Parliamentary constituency.
- Assembly Categorisation: Rural
- Literacy Level: 73.78%.
- Eligible Electors as per 2021 General Elections: 1,65,977 Eligible Electors. Male Electors:84,493 . Female Electors: 81,475.
- Geographic Co-Ordinates: 26°23'20.8"N 92°33'24.5"E.
- Total Area Covered: 154 square kilometres.
- Area Includes: hing thana (excluding Dhing mouzah;) Hatichong Mouza in Nowgong thana in Nowgong sub-division; and Silpukhuri Mouza in Mikirbheta thana in Marigaon sub-division, of Nagaon district of Assam.
- Inter State Border : Nagaon.
- Number Of Polling Stations: Year 2011-159, Year 2016-167, Year 2021-84.

== Members of the Legislative Assembly ==
Following is the list of past members from this constituency to Assam Legislature:

Year	Name	Party
1978	Baneswar Saikia	Revolutionary Communist Party of India
1983	Kiran Borah	Indian National Congress
1985	Digen Chandra Borah	Independent
1991	Gautam Bora	Indian National Congress
1996	Digen Chandra Borah	Asom Gana Parishad
2001	Gautam Bora	Indian National Congress
2006	Gautam Bora	Indian National Congress
2011	Gautam Bora	Indian National Congress
2016	Angoorlata Deka	Bharatiya Janata Party
2021	Sibamoni Bora	Indian National Congress

== Election results ==
=== 2021 ===
2021 Assam Legislative Assembly election: Batadroba
Party	Candidate	Votes	%	±%
INC	Sibamoni Bora	84,278	60.05	+27.2
BJP	Angoorlata Deka	51,458	36.9%	−0.73
Independent	Matiur Rahman	1,690	1.2	N/A
JD(U)	Anupam Baruah	815	0.6	N/A
RUC	Musleha Begum	463	0.3	N/A
Independent	Prafulla Rajkhowa	370	0.3	N/A
Asom Jana Morcha	Fakar Uddin	274	0.2	N/A
NOTA	None of the above	1,078	0.7	+0.06
Majority		32,820	23.6	+18.82
Turnout		1,39,348	91.1	+2.94
Registered electors		1,54,168		
INC gain from BJP		Swing	+27.93	

=== 2016 ===
2016 Assam Legislative Assembly election: Batadroba
Party	Candidate	Votes	%	±%
BJP	Angoorlata Deka	46,343	37.63	+34.99
INC	Gautam Bora	38,458	32.85	−7.06
AIUDF	Najiruddin Ahmed	33,022	26.81	−12.98
Independent	Rajasree Bora	830	0.67	N/A
CPI(ML)L	Arup Kumar Mahanta	559	0.45	N/A
Independent	Mukul Bora	551	0.44	N/A
BVM	Paban Pran Rabi Das	434	0.35	N/A
Independent	Dilwar Ahmed	237	0.19	N/A
NOTA	None of the above	792	0.64	N/A
Majority		5,985	4.78	+4.66
Turnout		1,23,126	88.07	+8.10
Registered electors		1,39,793		
BJP gain from INC		Swing	+13.97	

=== 2011 ===
2011 Assam Legislative Assembly election: Batadroba
Party	Candidate	Votes	%	±%
INC	Gautam Bora	40,950	39.91	+6.72
AIUDF	Matiur Rahman	40,819	39.79	+22.90
AGP	Mamoni Baruah	14,192	13.83	−7.93
BJP	Kusum Kumar Mahanta	2,712	2.64	−4.63
NCP	Diluwar Ahmed	1,243	1.21	−0.23
Independent	Prafulla Rajkhowa	960	0.93	N/A
CPI	Jatin Bhuyan	746	0.72	N/A
SP	Hariqul Islam	591	0.57	N/A
AITC	Biswajyoti Saikia	373	0.36	N/A
Majority		131	0.12	−11.31
Turnout		1,02,586	79.97	+0.65
INC hold		Swing		

=== 2006 ===
Assam Legislative Assembly election, 2006: Batadroba
Party	Candidate	Votes	%	±%
INC	Gautam Bora	33,661	33.19	
AGP	Mamoni Bora	22,074	21.76	
AIUDF	Najiruddin Ahmed	17,134	16.89	
NBNP	Matiur Rahman	14,931	14.72	
BJP	Ranjit Majumdar	7,370	7.27	
AGP(P)	Dilip Raja	3,724	3.67	
NCP	Ekbal Hussain	1,459	1.44	
Independent	Deba Kumar Saikia	1,074	1.06	
Majority		11,587	11.43	
Turnout		1,01,427	79.32	
INC hold		Swing		

== See also ==
- Kokrajhar
- List of constituencies of Assam Legislative Assembly
