= Cocktail 2 (soundtrack) =

Soundtrack album by Pritam
- Released: 25 June 2026
- Recorded: 2025–26
- Genre: Film soundtrack
- Length: 34:46
- Languages: Hindi, Italian
- Labels: Universal Music India; Sony Music India (Bandhu 2.0)
- Producer: Abhijit Vaghani

Pritam chronology
Bhooth Bangla (2026)	Cocktail 2 (2026)	Haiwaan (2026)

Cocktail 2 is a soundtrack, composed by Pritam and lyrics written by Amitabh Bhattacharya to the 2026 Hindi film of the same name directed by Homi Adajania. The film stars Shahid Kapoor, Kriti Sanon and Rashmika Mandanna in the lead roles. The soundtrack album to the film was released worldwide by Universal on 25 June 2026. With nine original songs, similar to its predecessor, the music of the film continues the production house's tradition of delivering music-driven storytelling.

The soundtrack's first single, "Jab Talak", was first reported in October 2025 and introduced with a teaser in April 2026. Composer Pritam described the song as an attempt to blend a light, breezy atmosphere with emotional depth, while director Homi Adajania sought to evoke the spirit of the original Cocktail through a contemporary musical approach. The album later attracted online discussion over similarities between "Mashooqa" and an Italian composition, with reports debating whether the resemblance constituted copying or sampling. Co-composer and singer Mahmood contributed the song's Italian lyrics and vocals. Music producer and arranger Abhijit Vaghani described the soundtrack as a fusion of nostalgia, contemporary electronic music and live instrumentation, with an emphasis on modern, upbeat compositions. The promotional remix "Bandhu 2.0", a reimagining of "Tum Hi Ho Bandhu" from Cocktail, was released as a promotional single close to the film's theatrical release date, however, it was not included as part of the soundtrack album. It was released by the record label Sony Music India, separately.

The soundtrack album and background score composed by Pritam received positive to mixed reviews from critics, with many identifying the music as one of the film's strongest aspects. Music critics praised the soundtrack's energy, melodies, integration with the narrative, and effective background score, with songs such as "Tujhko", "Mashooqa", and "Jab Talak" receiving pertinent acclaim. Several critics noted that the music elevated a screenplay they found weaker, although a few felt the soundtrack relied heavily on nostalgia or failed to leave a lasting impression.

== Background ==
In October 2025, The Times of India reported the title of the first single from the soundtrack album as "Jab Talak". The Central Board of Film Certification (CBFC) granted the song UA 16+ rating with a runtime of 1 minute 51 seconds. The song was reported as a party dance number on a roof-top setting. The first glimpse of "Jab Talak" was released on April 8, 2026, where Pritam mentioned that for "Jab Talak", the idea was to create a song that feels light, breezy and deeply emotional at the same time." Through "Jab Talak", Adajania aimed to recreate the charm associated with his 2012 film Cocktail, while presenting a more contemporary take on relationships and friendships. In May 2026, the track "Mashooqa" from the soundtrack album became a subject of widespread internet discussion because its composition was similar to the 1993 Italian track "Se So Arrubate A Nonna" composed by the duo Bibì e Cocò. Reports accused composer Pritam of copying the tune, whereas a few defended it as a case of sampling, a common practice in the music industry. Singer Mahmood co-composed the song and wrote and sang its Italian portions. The music video depicts Shahid Kapoor and Kriti Sanon's characters travelling together and falling in love. Talking about the collaboration with Mahmood, Pritam said, "Imagine what collaboration with the right artist can bring to the soundscape of a song. Mashooqa, which is shot in Sicily, is made more real and relatable by immensely talented Italian artist Mahmood, whose voice's texture and singing style elevated the song to another level".

Abhijit Vaghani stated that for the track "Jag Se Laaj" from the beginning, he wanted to create "a high-energy party track" different from existing music numbers. He recalled that the first Cocktail had a very specific sound that lives in people's memories, so the pressure while composing "Jag Se Laaj" was quite high. While working on the song "Jab Talak". Pritam and he were exploring completely new disco-inspired spaces with hardcore EDM basslines, and audiences genuinely want that sound today. Vaghani received a simple brief termed as "keep it modern" while composing for the soundtrack album. While working on the score, he had to make the music edgy and upbeat. Overall, he called out that the album's genre was quite "bending" to fuse nostalgia, live mashups and future-facing sounds. On June 17, a promotional single "Bandhu 2.0" was a remix of the song "Tum Hi Ho Bandhu" from Cocktail was released. Kavita Seth and Neeraj Sridhar recorded their vocals for "Bandhu 2.0" song. The song was filmed on a set, in a contrast to the original song "Tum Hi Ho Bandhu" that was shot on live locations. The song video was a deliberate attempt of self-aware potshots at themselves for attempting a remake of such a popular song and fearing of being trolled. In an interview with News18, Kapoor stated "Tujhko has a certain stillness to it... the kind that sneaks up on you. It's romantic without trying too hard, and that's what I connected with most. There's an ease and intimacy to the song that feels very real." Gioconda Vessichelli recorded a track for the album, calling it a piece that delicately encapsulates the emotions of love, longing and human connection and retained contemporary music sensibilities.

== Reception ==
Rishabh Suri for Hindustan Times, wrote: "Pritam's music works better than the screenplay in some places. The songs blend with the film's breezy mood and help maintain its energy, particularly in the more enjoyable first half." Joginder Tuteja for The Indian Express writes: "Pritam's music is another character actually in the narrative. While the fun songs are good, it's tujhko which plays in your mind the most. Background music is impressive as per the mood of the situations." Anuj Kumar for The Hindu wrote: "The only element that retains its verve is Pritam's music, and songs such as Mashooqa and Jab Talak capture the vibe of an Adajania film much more than the screenplay does."Critical Review Board of Bollywood Hungama wrote: "Pritam Chakraborty's music is energetic and soulful. 'Jab Talak' and 'Mashooqa' are the best of the lot. 'Tujhko' is melodious. 'Jaag Se Laaj' and 'Lehar' are well placed. 'Tumhi Ho Bandhu' comes at an important juncture. Pritam Chakraborty's background score is in sync with the mood of the film." Writing for High On Film, Sanjib Kalita wrote: In this sequel, they beautifully recreate the Bandhu song, and they manage to bring back the glamour and clichés of the musical videos that can make you groove, but the film forgets that "Cocktail" worked not only because of the love triangle or the music but because of the longing and tenderness that grew and took a reasonable pace with the development of the story.

At South Asian Herald, Rajiv Vijayakar wrote: "Pritam's music adds to the appeal. His background score underscores his brilliance in that department. Amitabh Bhattacharya yet again shows his lyrical dexterity." Jony Nepal of The Kathmandu Post cited: "Within the plot that fails to surprise, Pritam's music holds the thread, including 'Tujhko', 'Leher', 'Mashooqa', and the remake of 'Bandhu', gaining fragmented appreciation for the film." Madhurima Sarkar in her review for Mashable, went on to add that "the music fails to leave an impression, adding to the film's overall inertia." In her review for India Today, Prachi Arya stated: "Cocktail 2 clearly understands the importance of music and tries hard to recreate that magic. Yet, in the process of doing so, it leans on nostalgia by serving up Bandhu 2.0, almost borrowing from the goodwill of the first film to build instant listener appeal." Manjusha Radhakrishnan in her review for Gulf News quoted: "The Sicilian backdrop is gorgeous, the music works." In her review for India TV, Anindita Mukhopadhyay wrote: "Music is one of the few saving graces of Cocktail 2. From Mashooqa and Vallah to Tujhko, the film's soundtrack is genuinely impressive and easily among its strongest assets. And if you've been busy hating on Tum Hi Ho Bandhu 2.0, fret not - you'll barely notice its presence in the film because it's used so briefly. More importantly, the makers thankfully resisted the urge to turn it into yet another overproduced remix, letting the iconic track exist in relative peace without unnecessary tampering."

=== Music charts ===
On May 9, 2026 (week 15, 2025), "Jab Talak" was released in the form of film's teaser, where it debuted on #15 position on Mirchi Music charts. By June 2026 (week 22, 2025), the track "Mashooqa" stood amongst top 5 songs of Mirchi Music charts, whereas "Tujhko" debuted at #10 position. and peaked at #6 in the week 24, 2025. "Vallah" debuted at #10 position in the same week. "Bandhu 2.0" debuted at Indian Music charts at #64 position.

== Track-listing ==
All tracks are written by Amitabh Bhattacharya, except where noted.

Cocktail 2 (Original Motion Picture Soundtrack)
No.	Title	Singers	Length
1.	"Mashooqa"	Raghav Chaitanya, Mahmood, Ruaa Kayy	03:50
2.	"Tujhko"	Arijit Singh, Sunidhi Chauhan	05:42
3.	"Leher"	Arijit Singh	04:15
4.	"Jab Talak"	Arijit Singh, Akasa, Madhubanti Bagchi	03:12
5.	"Humesha (Film Version)"	Raghav Chaitanya	04:00
6.	"Vallah"	Harrdy Sandhu, Bayanni	03:13
7.	"Tujhko (Sad Version)"	Sunidhi Chauhan	03:43
8.	"Jag Se Laaj"	Shilpa Rao, Aarvan, W.i.S.H.	03:27
9.	"Tujhko (Fan Version)"	Yuvann	03:24
10.	"Bulleya Bhuleya Main"	Samaya	03:32
Total length:			34:46

=== Notes ===
- Mahmood is the co-composer, performer and writer of Italian lyrics on Track 1
- Rony Ajnali and Gill Machhrai have written the Punjabi lyrics for Track 6

Bandhu 2.0 (from "Cocktail 2) - Single
No.	Title	Writer(s)	Singers	Length
1.	"Bandhu 2.0"	Irshad Kamil	Neeraj Sridhar. Kavita Seth	03:41
Total length:				03:41

== Album credits ==
Pritam served as the official music and background score composer, co-producer of the soundtrack album and musical arrangements, except where noted. Credits adapted from liner notes from Universal Group India's YouTube channel.

- AM.AN - Music Programmer & Arranger (Tracks 1, 5, 6), Live Guitars (Track 1, 6)
- Abhijit Vaghani - Music Programmer & Arranger (Tracks 2, 8), Vocal Conductor & Backing Vocal Designer (Track 8)
- Prasanna Suresh - Additional Programmer & Arranger (Track 2)
- Rahul Tiwari - Additional Music Programmer & Arranger (Track 5)
- Sunny M.R. - Music Programmer & Arranger (Track 1), Sound Design (Track 1)
- Meghdeep Bose - Music Programmer & Arranger (Track 1)
- Arijit Singh - Music Programmer & Arranger (Track 1), Sound Design (Track 1), Live Acoustic Guitar (Track 1)
- Ashwin Kulkarni - Sound Design (Track 1), Chief Engineer (Track 1), Sound Design & Chief Engineer (Track 2), Chief Engineer / Shootmix (Track 5), Audio Post Production Supervisor & Chief Engineer (Tracks 6, 8)
- DJ Phukan - Sound Design (Track 1), Backing Vocal Design (Track 5), Flute (Track 2)
- Ritvik Shah - Sound Design (Track 1), Recording Engineer at Arijit Singh's Studio (Track 1)
- Shadab Rayeen - Mixed & Mastered (Tracks 1, 5)
- Eric Pillai - Mixed & Mastered (Tracks 2, 6, 8)
- Michael Edwin Pillai - Assistant to Eric Pillai (Tracks 2, 6, 8)
- Anurag Sharma - Music Production Manager (Tracks 1, 2, 5, 6, 8), Additional Chorus (Track 6), "Gidda" Designed & Written (Track 8)
- Brianna Supriyo - Music Production Manager (Tracks 1, 2, 5, 6, 8), Additional Voice (Track 2), Backing Vocal Design (Track 2), Chorus (Track 5), Chorus (Track 8)
- Mithila Lad Nayak - Studio Manager (Tracks 1, 2, 5, 6, 8), Chorus (Track 8)
- Pranav Gupta - Sound Engineer (Tracks 1, 2, 5, 6, 8)
- Aniruddh Anantha - Sound Engineer (Tracks 1, 2, 5, 6, 8), Vocal Conductor (Tracks 1, 2, 5), Backing Vocal Design (Track 1), Backing Vocal Design (Track 2), Backing Vocals Design & Vocals (Track 6), Vocal Conductor & Backing Vocal Designer (Track 8), Chorus (Track 1)
- Aarvan - Sound Engineer (Tracks 1, 2, 5, 6, 8), Vocal Conductor (Tracks 1, 2, 5), Backing Vocal Design (Track 1), Backing Vocal Design (Track 2), Backing Vocals Design & Vocals (Track 6), Vocal Conductor & Backing Vocal Designer (Track 8), Chorus (Track 1), Backing Vocals (Track 2)
- Akash Mukherjee - Sound Engineer (Tracks 1, 2, 5, 6, 8), Vocal Conductor (Tracks 1, 2, 5), Chorus (Track 1), Backing Vocals (Track 2), Additional Chorus (Track 6), Vocal Conductor & Backing Vocal Designer (Track 8)
- Khush Jaggi - Studio Assistant (Tracks 1, 2, 5, 6), Additional Track Design (Track 2), Backing Vocals (Track 2), Assistant Engineer (Track 8), Vocal Conductor & Backing Vocal Designer (Track 8)
- Ameya Dayal - Studio Assistant (Tracks 1, 2, 5, 6), Chorus (Track 1), Backing Vocals (Track 2), Assistant Engineer (Track 8)
- Sagnik Mukherjee - Studio Assistant (Tracks 1, 5), Additional Track Design (Track 2), Additional Chorus (Track 6), Studio Assistant (Track 8)
- Anushree Amod - Studio Intern (Tracks 1, 2, 5, 6), Studio Assistant (Track 8), Chorus (Track 8)
- Thomson Andrews - Backing Vocals (Tracks 1, 2), Backing Vocal Design (Track 2)
- Arun Kamath - Backing Vocals (Tracks 1, 2)
- Arjun Chandy - Backing Vocal Design (Track 2), Backing Vocals (Track 2)
- Jazbaat - Mixing Assistant to Shadab (Tracks 1, 5)
- Sohamm - Mixing Assistant to Shadab (Tracks 1, 5)
- Suryansh - Mixing Assistant to Shadab (Tracks 1, 5)
- Sukanto Singha - Recording Engineer at Arijit Singh's Studio (Track 1), Arijit Singh Recorded by (Track 2)
- John Paul - Live Acoustic Guitar (Track 1), Live Electric Guitar & Bass (Track 1)
- Saswata Das - Live Acoustic Guitar (Track 1)
- Naveen Kumar - Flute (Track 2)
- Mohini Dey - Bass (Track 2)
- Rajkumar Dewan - Bass (Track 2)
- Mahmood - Italian Parts Written, Co-Composed & Performed (Track 5)
- Pedro Medina (Madriles Records) - Live Horns & Bagpipe Session Coordination (Track 5)
- Luis Rodrigo - Sound Engineer at Pasul Records (Track 5)
- Ariel Bringuez - Saxophone (Track 5)
- Roberto Pacheco - Trombone (Track 5)
- Raúl - Trumpet (Track 5)
- Álvaro Pintos - Bagpipe (Track 5)
- Sheena Thakur - Chorus (Track 5)
- Shreya Phukan - Chorus (Track 5)
- Antaraa Bhattacharya - Chorus (Track 5)
- Aasa Singh - Shout (Tracks 6, 8)
- Subhashree Das - Chorus (Track 8)
