= Roi Roi Binale =

2025 Indian Assamese musical romantic drama film

- Theatrical release poster
- Directed by: Rajesh Bhuyan
- Written by: Zubeen Garg
- Screenplay by: Rahul Gautam; Santanu Rowmuria
- Story by: Zubeen Garg
- Produced by: Garima Saikia Garg; Zubeen Garg; Shyamantak Gautam
- Starring: Zubeen Garg; Mousumi Alifa; Yashashree Bhuyan; Achurjya Borpatra; Joy Kashyap; Victor Banerjee; Gioconda Vessichelli; Ujjal Rajkhowa; Mitali Roy; Dhritiman Phukan; Angoorlata Deka; Kaushik Bharadwaj; Sudarshan Nath; Anuska Kashyap
- Cinematography: Suman Duwarah; Gyan Gautam
- Edited by: Pratim Khaund
- Music by: Songs: Zubeen Garg; Dipkesh Borgohain; Ishanu; Score: Poran Borkatoky
- Production companies: Zeal Creations; Eye Creation
- Distributed by: UFO Moviez
- Release date: 31 October 2025
- Running time: 147 minutes
- Country: India
- Language: Assamese
- Budget: ₹5 crore
- Box office: ₹42 crore (Note: NDTV | TV9 Bharatvarsh)

Roi Roi Binale (transl. 'Tears Still Flow') is a 2025 Indian Assamese-language musical romantic drama film directed by Rajesh Bhuyan and written by Zubeen Garg. The film was produced under the banner of Zeal Creations and Eye Creation. It stars Zubeen Garg in his final acting role alongside Mousumi Alifa, Joy Kashyap, Achurjya Borpatra and many more. The title of the film was derived from the song of the same name in his album Sobdo (1998).

The film was Zubeen Garg’s last film and dream project. The film was presented by the production company as a musical love story set against the backdrop of a region recovering from the scars of terrorism. It received a wide theatrical release. It became the highest grossing Assamese film of 2025 as well as currently the highest grossing Assamese film of all time surpassing Bidurbhai. Even though parts of the movie were incomplete because of Zubeen Garg's death.

== Plot ==
Set in an Assamese town, a struggling musician's world is filled with sound, imagination, and love. He strives to find meaning and beauty amid life's ongoing struggles. His desire to experience the vastness and calm of the sea becomes a recurring theme.

== Cast ==
- Zubeen Garg as Rahul: known by his stage name Raul
  - Snehangsha Protim Baruah as young Raul
- Mousumi Alifa as Mousumi "Mou": Raul's love interest
- Joy Kashyap as Neer
- Saurabh Hazarika as Debo
  - Kaushik Bharadwaj as young Debo
- Achurjya Borpatra as Jimmy, Neer's friend
- Victor Banerjee as Victor Sir: Raul's music teacher
- Ujjal Rajkhowa
- Yashashree Bhuyan as Runumi: Debo's late wife
- Mitali Roy
- Dhritiman Phukan as Mou's father
- Angoorlata Deka as Meera: Mou's mother
- Sudarshan Nath as Akbar
- Anuska Kashyap as Mou's friend
- Partha Pratim Hazarika as Neer's band member
- Raja Boruah as Neer's band member
- Anudhriti Borthakur
- Garima Saikia Garg (special appearance as one of the singers in opening chrous)
- Gioconda Vessichelli (special appearance in the song "Roi Roi Binale" recreated version)
- Sunita Kaushik (special appearance in the song "Dusokur Kajolere")
- Meghranjani Medhi (special appearance in the song "Dusokur Kajolere")
- Kapil Thakur (archived footage)
- Zublee (archived footage)
- Mahalakshmi Iyer (archived footage)
- Shekhar Jyoti Goswami (archived footage)
- Rahul Gautam Sharma (archived footage)
- Shyamontika Sharma (archived footage)
- Jayanta Kakoti (archived footage)
- Jayanta Patra (archived footage)
- Raageshwari Loomba (archived footage)

== Production ==
=== Development ===
Roi Roi Binale was conceived and written by Zubeen Garg, who also composed the music. Director Rajesh Bhuyan stated that the film had been in development for nearly three years before Zubeen’s passing in September 2025.

=== Post-production ===
According to Bhuyan, most of the film was completed before Zubeen Garg’s death, with only minor background music work remaining, in which he was scheduled to compose after returning from Singapore on 21 September 2025. Poran Borkotoky was hired to compose the remaining background music score after Zubeen's death. His original voice recordings will be retained, with minimal AI-assisted restoration where necessary.

Roi Roi Binale is presented as a tribute to the artistic legacy of multitalented Zubeen Garg, marking his final contribution to Assamese cinema as an actor, writer, director and composer. In that respect, Assam Congress president Gaurav Gogoi has urged the State government to make Roi Roi Binale, cultural icon Zubeen Garg’s final feature film, tax-free, reports The Hindu.

At the cabinet meeting of the Assam government, the Chief Minister Himanta Biswa Sarma stated that, as no entertainment tax is levied in the state, there is no question of waiving it. The government also announced that it will donate its entire share of the Goods and Services Tax (GST) collected from Zubeen Garg’s last film "Roi Roi Binale", to the Kalaguru Artiste Foundation. This charitable organization is founded by the late singer. The foundation supports medical treatment for artistes, aids flood victims, and assists needy students. The decision was made after consultation with Garg’s family.

== Soundtrack ==
Roi Roi Binale

Soundtrack album by Zubeen Garg, Dipkesh Borgohain, Poran Borkatoky and Ishanu
- Released: 18 November 2025
- Recorded: 2023–2025
- Studios: ZG Studio, Guwahati, Assam, India
- Genre: Feature film soundtrack
- Language: Assamese
- Labels: Saregama; Zeal Creation Audio
- Producer: Zubeen Garg

Zubeen Garg chronology
Homework (2025)	Roi Roi Binale (2025)	Koka Deutar Nati Aru Hati 2 (2026)

Singles from Roi Roi Binale
- 1. "Mur Mon" Released: 7 October 2025; 2. "Xopun Xopun" Released: 15 October 2025; 3. "Joon Jwoli" Released: 29 October 2025; 4. "Sokulure (Roi Roi Binale)" Released: 4 November 2025; 5. "Roi Roi Binale (Title Track)" Released: 14 November 2025; 6. "Tumar Nilim Kothar Dore" Released: 18 November 2025; 7. "Dusokur Kajolere" Released: 4 December 2025; 8. "Free Bird" Released: 26 December 2025

The soundtrack of the film features original compositions and vocals by Zubeen Garg. The songs blend traditional Assamese melodies with contemporary arrangements.

The first single, "Mur Mon" which was sung by Zubeen Garg and Sweety Das was released on 7 October 2025. The second single, "Xopun Xopun" was released on 15 October 2025, the third single, "Joon Jwoli" was released on 29 October 2025 and the forth single "Sokulure" (Roi Roi Binale) was released on 4 November 2025.

The title song "Roi Roi Binale" was a remake of the song from the 1998 album Sobdo.

Music Arrangement and programming was done by Zubeen Garg, Papu Gogoi (Papz), Sumit Baruah, Dipkesh Borgohain, Poran Borkatoky and Ishanu.

Track List
No.	Title	Lyrics	Music	Singer(s)	Length
1.	"Mur Mon"	Zubeen Garg	Zubeen Garg	Zubeen Garg, Sweety Das	03:12
2.	"Xopun Xopun"	Zubeen Garg	Zubeen Garg	Zubeen Garg, Marami Sarma	03:47
3.	"Jun Jwoli"	Zubeen Garg	Zubeen Garg	Zubeen Garg	04:42
4.	"Roi Roi Binale" (Title Track)	Zubeen Garg	Zubeen Garg	Zubeen Garg, Gioconda Vessichelli	06:00
5.	"Mon Gole"	Zubeen Garg	Zubeen Garg	Zubeen Garg, Achurjya Borpatra, Fency Rajkumari	03:49
6.	"Sokulure Roi Roi Binale"	Zubeen Garg	Zubeen Garg	Zubeen Garg, Achurjya Borpatra	03:59
7.	"Tumar Nilim Kothar Dore"	Zubeen Garg	Zubeen Garg	Zubeen Garg	04:29
8.	"Dusokur Kajolere"	Zubeen Garg	Zubeen Garg, Dipkesh Borgohain	Sabita Sharma Goswami, Arundhati Bhanupriya	02:50
9.	"Free Bird"	Sasanka Samir	Zubeen Garg	Papon, Joi Barua	03:40
10.	"Kore Pora Aahi"	Rahul Gautam Sharma	Zubeen Garg, Ishanu	Neel Akash, Rahul Gautam Sharma	04:49
11.	"Mukuta Mukuta"	Zubeen Garg	Zubeen Garg	Students of Abhinaya, Zubeen Garg	02:58

Notes

- Track 11, "Mukuta Mukuta," is only exclusive on YouTube, but it was never featured or used in the movie.

== Release ==
The film was released nationwide on 31 October 2025. As a tribute to Garg, every cinema hall across Assam will exclusively screen the film, suspending all holdover releases including Kantara: Chapter 1, Dude, Thamma and Ek Deewane ki Deewaniyat, while also not playing newer releases including Baahubali: The Epic and The Taj Story.

With screenings in more than 180 screenings across India, the film received the "widest-ever release for an Assamese film". Some of the screenings took place at an early hour in Assam, some long-locked theaters reopening specifically for the occasion. The number of bookings also broke all Assamese records.

== Reception ==
"Garg never seemed like he was burdened with a task either, and the sense of abandonment is arguably what drew the people of his region so close to him. He was, as many suggest, unostentatious yet appealing, and his final film Roi Roi Binale is fitting to that image.", wrote Swaroop Kodur in The Federal.

== Awards and nominations ==
Award Ceremony	Date of Ceremony (Note: Date is linked to the article about the awards held that year, wherever possible.)	Category	Recipient	Result	Ref.
Prag Cine Awards 2026	5 July 2026	Best Actor	Zubeen Garg	Nominated	
Prag Cine Awards 2026	5 July 2026	Best Actress	Mousumi Alifa	Won	
Prag Cine Awards 2026	5 July 2026	Best Music Director	Zubeen Garg	Won	
Prag Cine Awards 2026	5 July 2026	Best Female Debut	Mousumi Alifa	Won	
Prag Cine Awards 2026	5 July 2026	Best Male Debut	Achurjya Borpatra	Nominated	
Prag Cine Awards 2026	5 July 2026	Best Costume Designer	Garima Saikia Garg	Won	
Prag Cine Awards 2026	5 July 2026	Best Director	Rajesh Bhuyan	Won	
