= Mary Kom (soundtrack) =

Soundtrack album by Shashi Suman and Shivamm Pathak
- Released: 4 August 2014
- Recorded: 2013–2014
- Genre: Feature film soundtrack
- Length: 24:55
- Language: Hindi
- Label: Zee Music Company

Mary Kom is the soundtrack to the 2014 film of the same name directed by Omung Kumar based on the life of the eponymous boxer Mary Kom, starring Priyanka Chopra. The film's soundtrack consists of seven tracks: four tracks composed by Shashi Suman, two by Shivamm Pathak and a song "Ziddi Dil" by them jointly. Prashant Ingole, Sandeep Singh and Bijou Thaangjam. Vishal Dadlani, Arijit Singh, Sunidhi Chauhan, Mohit Chauhan, Salim Merchant, Divya Kumar performed the vocals for the film. Zee Music Company released the soundtrack on 4 August 2014.

== Development ==
Mary Kom is the debut film composition for Shashi Suman and Shivamm Pathak, who were former contestants of the Indian Idol reality show. Sandeep Singh, who was the CEO of Bhansali Productions contacted Suman regarding the tune he had composed for and appreciated him. After a formal meeting, Suman had worked on few television shows by Singh's recommendation and also assisted Sanjay Leela Bhansali on Goliyon Ki Raasleela Ram-Leela (2013). When Bhansali produced Mary Kom, he recruited him as the musician for the film as well as Pathak, whom Suman insisted on collaborating for the film with two of tunes had been used for the film.

From the onset, Suman wanted a different kind of sound and music that is distinctive from the mainstream biopic films, as Mary Kom is "a unique personality who comes from the Northeastern region of our country". He went to Manipur to research on the culture and find the essence of the community, as the color, background and music had to reflect that culture in some way. He incorporated folk instrumentation with Manipuri phrases, in the songs "Adhure" and "Chaoro". The latter was the first song to be composed for the film, which was lullaby number with no effect and minimal instrumentation. He was suggested to have a Manipuri word as a hook line, which should have a universal connect. Hence the word "Chaoro" was derived by fellow lyricist Bijou Thaangjam which translates to "my son, grow and rise".

Suman said that there were no songs with lip sync. So "the scene where Mary Kom is trying to relieve her son and put him to sleep needed on camera singing. If someone else would sing it, it would not feel raw or real" which resulted in Chopra rendering the track. It is her second stint as a playback singer after previously singing "Ullathai Killathey" from Thamizhan (2002) and her first in Hindi. When Chopra and Bhansali heard the tune, they were "instantly hooked" and the former asked Suman to send the lyrics on e-mail so that she could rehearse it during the intervals on shoot. Though Suman had completed the song, he could not send the antaras, hence while Chopra arrived for the recording, Suman felt that she would have to learn the words and tune and rehearse it before the session. However, Chopra finished the recording within 30 minutes. Suman recalled that:

"When you see Priyanka sing on screen, you will feel that she is a real a mother, putting her children to sleep. That's quite something given the fact that forget being a mother, she's not even married. When I told her this, she laughed that she was an actress and it came naturally to her to convincingly showcase emotions without actually experiencing them."

The track "Ziddi Dil" had a "powerful and strong arrangement" which led him to decide that Vishal Dadlani would sing the track. He then pitched the song to Dadlani, who liked it and sang the track at 1:30 a.m. in his studio. Suman was highly selective of singers who could do justice to the songs and pitched that track to selected singers who liked them. Mohit Chauhan performed "Teri Baari" which was a high tenor number, different from Chauhan's vocal style, which he called it as an "unusual experience".

== Release ==
The soundtrack was preceded with the first song "Ziddi Dil" on 24 July 2014, and the second song "Sukoon Mila" on 30 July. The third song "Adhure" was released along with the soundtrack on 4 August 2014. It was further coincided with a launch event in Mumbai attended by Omung Kumar, Chopra, Ssingh and Mary Kom. The background music was composed by Rohit Kulkarni. Vocals were performed by Vishal Dadlani, Arijit Singh, Sunidhi Chauhan, Mohit Chauhan, Salim Merchant, Divya Kumar. Zee Music Company distributed the soundtrack to digital and physical formats. The song "Salaam India" was the official song at the 2014 Asian Games, held in South Korea.

== Track listing ==
Track listing
No.	Title	Lyrics	Music	Singer(s)	Length
1.	"Ziddi Dil"	Prashant Ingole	Shashi Suman, Shivamm Pathak	Vishal Dadlani, Gioconda Vessichelli	4:46
2.	"Sukoon Mila"	Sandeep Singh	Shivamm Pathak	Arijit Singh	3:19
3.	"Adhure"	Prashant Ingole	Shashi Suman	Sunidhi Chauhan	3:49
4.	"Teri Baari"	Prashant Ingole	Shashi Suman	Mohit Chauhan	3:07
5.	"Saudebaazi"	Prashant Ingole	Shashi Suman	Arijit Singh	3:27
6.	"Salaam India"	Sandeep Singh	Shivamm Pathak	Vishal Dadlani, Salim Merchant	3:54
7.	"Chaoro (Lori)"	Sandeep Singh, Bijou Thaangjam	Shashi Suman	Priyanka Chopra	2:33

== Reception ==
Kasmin Fernandes of The Times of India noted that the soundtrack is both, "inspirational and soul-stirring", describing the opening track "Ziddi Dil" as a "clear winner that could lift anyone's spirits in a time of distress." Namrata Thakker of Bollywood Life described the album as "terrific" giving 4 out of 5. Rajiv Vijayakar of Bollywood Hungama gave it a rating of 3.5 out of 5, and said that the composers did justice to the theme of the film. Rediff.com's Joginder Tuteja called the compositions "motivational", and wrote that "Mary Kom's soundtrack may not be an instant chart-buster, but it holds its own." Writing for The Financial Express, Priya Adivarekar stated that the risk of recruiting newcomers to compose the soundtrack paid off, concluding, "Although the album does not deliver an instant chartbuster, it does have well composed numbers which are hummable." The review praised the singing of the artists on the album. Like Tuteja, Adivarekar noted that Chopra sang the lullaby with "great emotions". Karthik Srinivasan of Milliblog felt "heartwarming to see two Indian Idol finalists make an accomplished composing debut". Vipin Nair of Music Aloud assigned a score of 7.5 out of 10, describing it as a "fine debut" for the duo. In a negative review, Suanshu Khurana felt that most of the album "is full of deadpan riffs" assigning one-and-a-half out of five.

== Accolades ==
Award	Date of ceremony (Note: Date is linked to the article about the awards held that year, wherever possible.)	Category	Recipient(s) and nominee(s)	Result	Ref.
Filmfare Awards	31 January 2015	Best Background Score	Rohit Kulkarni	Nominated	
Mirchi Music Awards	27 February 2015	Upcoming Music Composer of The Year	Shashi Suman (for the song "Ziddi Dil")	Nominated	
Mirchi Music Awards	27 February 2015	Upcoming Music Composer of The Year	Shivam Pathak (for the song "Sukoon Mila")	Nominated	
Screen Awards	14 January 2015	Best Background Music	Rohit Kulkarni	Nominated	
