= Angoorlata Deka =

Indian actress and politician

Member of Assam Legislative Assembly
- In office 2016–2021
- Preceded by: Gautam Bora
- Succeeded by: Sibamoni Bora
- Constituency: Batadroba

President of BJP Mahila Morcha, Assam
- In office 18 August 2021 – 13 December 2023
- Preceded by: Aparajita Bhuyan
- Succeeded by: Swapna Bania

Chairperson of Assam State Commission for Women
- Incumbent
- Assumed office 11 August 2025
- Preceded by: Madhu Sudan Nath

Personal details
- Born: 31 January 1986 (age 40) Nalbari, Assam, India
- Party: Bharatiya Janata Party (2015–present)
- Education: Gauhati University
- Other name: Angoorlata
- Occupations: Actress; Politician
- Years active: 2006–2016, 2025
- Spouse: Akashdeep Deka
- Children: 1

Angoorlata Deka (born 31 January 1986), also credited mononymously as Angoorlata, is an Indian actress and politician from Assam. She is a former member of the Assam Legislative Assembly. She is currently serving as the Chairperson of the Assam State Commission for Women.

== Acting career ==
Angoorlata has appeared in major roles in Assamese movies such as Junda Iman Gunda, Bakor Putek, Surjasta etc. She received the nomination for Best Actress in Assamese cinema at 2013 Filmfare Awards East for her role in Surjasta.

In 2025 after nearly a decade of transition to politics, she returned to Assamese cinema in the movie Roi Roi Binale.

== Political career ==
Angoorlata joined the Bharatiya Janata Party in December 2015. She represented the Batadroba constituency of Assam. She is one of six female candidates who were given tickets by the party, and one of two who won the elections in 2016. In 2021 Assam elections, she ran for the constituency again but lost to Sibamoni Bora.

Angoorlata served as the Vice-Chairman of the Srimanta Sankardev Kalakshetra from 18 November 2019 until 2021. She was appointed the President of BJP Mahila Morcha, Assam on 18 August 2021, until 2023 when she was succeeded by Swapna Bania. On 4 August 2025, she was appointed the chairperson of the Assam State Commission for Women and assumed her duties on 11 August 2025.

== Filmography ==
- All films are in Assamese unless otherwise noted.

| Year | Film | Role | Notes |
|---|---|---|---|
| 2006 | Aami Asomiya | Jonaki | |
| 2007 | Junda Iman Gunda | Jeenu | credited as Angoorlata |
| 2010 | Anjana | Jyoti | credited as Angoorlata |
| 2012 | Moromjaan | Shikha Phukan | credited as Angoorlata |
| 2012 | Bakor Putek | Padma | credited as Angoorlata |
| 2013 | Surjasta | Namita Chaliha | |
| 2014 | Pachauri | | Nepali movie, credited as Angurlata |
| 2014 | Hiya Diba Kak | Choyonika | credited as Angoorlata |
| 2014 | Jeeya Jurir Xubax | | |
| 2015 | Tez | | |
| 2016 | Gaane Ki Aane | | Special appearance in the song "Dancing Tonight" |
| 2025 | Roi Roi Binale | Meera | |
