= Dhing Assembly constituency =

Constituency of the Assam legislative assembly in India

Dhing
- Constituency No. 55 for the Assam Legislative Assembly

Constituency details
- Country: India
- Region: Northeast India
- State: Assam
- District: Nagaon
- Lok Sabha constituency: Nagaon
- Established: 1957
- Reservation: None

Dhing Assembly constituency is one of the 126 assembly constituencies of Assam Legislative Assembly. Dhing forms part of the Nagaon Lok Sabha constituency.

== Details ==
Following are details on Dhing Assembly constituency:

- Country: India.
- State: Assam.
- District: Nagaon district .
- Lok Sabha Constituency: Nagaon Lok Sabha constituency.
- Area Includes: Moirabari PT. Dev. Block, Dhing T.C., Batadraba Dev. Block(Part), Juria Dev. Block(Part).

== Members of Legislative Assembly ==
Election	Member	Party
1957	Nurul Islam	Indian National Congress
1962	Mvi. Md. Idrish	Indian National Congress
1967	Mohammad Samsul Huda	Indian National Congress
1972	Abul Hussain Mir	Indian National Congress
1978	Mohammad Samsul Huda	Revolutionary Communist Party of India
1983	Abu Nasir Ohid	Indian National Congress
1985	Shahidul Islam	Independent politician
1991	Muzibar Rahman	Indian National Congress
1996	Mustafa Shahidul Islam	Indian National Congress
2001	Idris Ali	Indian National Congress
2006	Mobarak Ali Pathan	All India United Democratic Front
2011	Aminul Islam	All India United Democratic Front
2016	Aminul Islam	All India United Democratic Front
2021	Aminul Islam	All India United Democratic Front
2026	Mehboob Mukhtar	Raijor Dal

== Election results ==
=== 2026 ===
2026 Assam Legislative Assembly election: Dhing
Party	Candidate	Votes	%	±%
RD	Mehboob Mukhtar	131,182	59.6	
AIUDF	Matiur Rahman	59,688	27.12	
BJP	Mukut Kumar Debnath	19,572	8.89	
RPI(A)	Hirak Jyoti Bora	3,185	1.45	
Revolutionary Communist Party of India (Rasik Bhatt)	Zakir Islam	3,088	1.40	
NOTA	NOTA	1,680	0.76	
Margin of victory		71,494		
Turnout		2,20,106	93.47	
Registered electors		2,35,481		
RD gain from AIUDF		Swing		

=== 2016 ===
2016 Assam Legislative Assembly election: Dhing
Party	Candidate	Votes	%	±%
AIUDF	Aminul Islam	82,786	47.78	
INC	Anwar Hussain	58,233	33.61	
Independent	Muzibur Rahman	17,807	10.27	
BJP	Mukut Kumar Debnath	8,958	5.17	
Independent	Mobarak Ali Pathan	1,004	0.57	
Independent	Mainul Hoque	843	0.48	
JMBP	Rajani Kanta Nath	823	0.47	
RCPI(RB)	Jamanur Rahman	737	0.42	
AITC	Jehirul Islam	710	0.40	
NOTA	None of the above	1,358	0.78	
Majority		24,553	14.17	
Turnout		1,73,259	92.07	
Registered electors		1,88,167		
AIUDF hold		Swing		
