= D. K. Barooah =

Indian politician (1914–1996)

Dev Kant Barooah
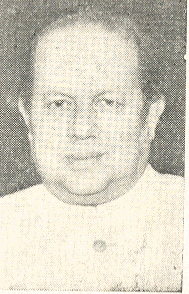

President of the Indian National Congress
- In office 1975–1977
- Preceded by: Shankar Dayal Sharma
- Succeeded by: Kasu Brahmananda Reddy

Union Minister of Petroleum and Chemicals
- In office 5 February 1973 – 10 October 1974
- Prime Minister: Indira Gandhi
- Preceded by: H. R. Gokhale
- Succeeded by: Keshav Dev Malviya

Governor of Bihar
- In office 1 February 1971 – 4 February 1973
- Chief Minister: Karpoori Thakur; Bhola Paswan Shastri; Kedar Pandey
- Preceded by: Ujjal Narayan Sinha (Acting)
- Succeeded by: Ramchandra Dhondiba Bhandare

Cabinet Minister, Assam
- In office 1 March 1962 – 16 March 1967
- Chief Minister: Bimala Prasad Chaliha
- Departments: Education; Co-operation; Tourism

Speaker of the Assam Legislative Assembly
- In office 8 June 1957 – 15 September 1959
- Deputy: R. N. Baruah
- Preceded by: Kuladhar Chaliha
- Succeeded by: Mahendra Mohan Choudhry

Member of Parliament, Lok Sabha
- In office 21 March 1977 – 11 January 1980
- Preceded by: Liladhar Kotoki
- Succeeded by: Muhi Ram Saikia
- In office 1952–1957
- Succeeded by: Liladhar Kotoki
- Constituency: Nowgong

Member of Parliament, Rajya Sabha
- In office 19 July 1973 – 21 March 1977
- Constituency: Assam

Member, Assam Legislative Assembly
- In office 1962–1972
- Preceded by: Usha Barthakur
- Succeeded by: Bishnu Prasad
- Constituency: Samaguri
- In office 1957–1962 Serving with Mahendra Nath Hazarika
- Preceded by: Constituency established
- Succeeded by: Moti Ram Bora
- Constituency: Nowgong

Personal details
- Born: 22 February 1914 Dibrugarh, Assam, British India
- Died: 28 January 1996 (aged 81) Delhi, India
- Party: Indian National Congress

Dev Kant Barooah (22 February 1914 – 28 January 1996) was an Indian politician from Assam, who served as the 83rd President of the Indian National Congress during the Emergency from 1975 to 1978 and the seventh Governor of Bihar from 1971 to 1973. He also served as union cabinet minister for Ministry of Petroleum and Natural Gas in Second Indira Gandhi ministry from 5 February 1973 to 10 October 1974. He was a member of the 1st Lok Sabha and 6th Lok Sabha. the elder brother of famous Assamese poet, Navakanta Barua and the first Assamese person to become the President of the Indian National Congress.

== Early life ==
Baruah was born on 22 February 1914 to Nilkanta Baruah at Dibrugarh, Assam Province (present-day Assam). He studied at Nowgong Government High School and graduated from Banaras Hindu University. After joining the Indian freedom struggle, he was imprisoned in 1930, 1941 and 1942.

== Career ==
In 1949–1951, Baruah's political career began as a member of the Constituent Assembly. He is now chiefly remembered for his alleged proclamation regarding Prime Minister Indira Gandhi, in 1974 "India is Indira. Indira is India." However, he later parted ways with her and joined Congress (Urs), later renamed as Indian Congress (Socialist). He was the Governor of Bihar from 1 February 1971 to 4 February 1973. He died in New Delhi. He is the first and only Assamese to be elected as a president of Indian National Congress.

Baruah was a noted poet as well. His collection of Assamese poems, Sagar Dekhisa (সাগৰ দেখিছা), is still very popular. He was the elder brother of famous Assamese poet Nabakanta Barua.

Party political offices
Preceded by Shankar Dayal Sharma	President of the Indian National Congress; 1975–1977	Succeeded by Indira Gandhi
