= Sibamoni Bora =

Indian politician

Member of Assam Legislative Assembly
- In office 21 May 2021 – 6 May 2026
- Preceded by: Angoorlata Deka
- Succeeded by: Constituency abolished
- Constituency: Batadroba

Personal details
- Born: 1 January 1963 (age 63)
- Party: Indian National Congress
- Parent: Kiran Bora (father)
- Relatives: Golap Borbora (father in law)
- Profession: Politician

Sibamoni Bora (born 1 January 1963) is an Indian politician and member of Indian National Congress from Assam. She was an MLA, elected from the Batadroba constituency in the 2021 Assam Legislative Assembly election. She was also the Indian National Congress candidate for the 2026 Nagaon bypoll where she humiliatingly finished third and failed to retain her security deposit.

== Early life and education ==
Bora is the daughter of former MLA of Batadroba, Kiran Bora. She has an M.Sc from Gauhati University in 1982, and a B.Sc from Nowgong College in 1980. She is the daughter in law of former Assam Chief Minister Golap Borbora.

== Political career ==
In the 2021 Assam Legislative Assembly election, Bora was the Indian National Congress candidate for Batadroba, the same constituency her father had previously represented. She received 84278 votes, 60.02% of the total vote. She defeated the incumbent MLA, Angoorlata Deka, by 32820 votes.

She contested the by election from Nagaon Lok Sabha constituency which was necessited after her Congress MP Pradyut Bordoloi joined the ruling Bharatiya Janata Party, as the Indian National Congress candidate in 2026 where she finished a distant third and even failed to protect her security deposit, polling 129492 votes, just about 8.9% of the total vote. The election was ultimately won by BJP candidate Devasish Sharma.
