= Mobarak Ali Pathan =

Indian politician

Mobarak Ali Pathan is an All India United Democratic Front politician from Assam. He was elected in the Assam Legislative Assembly election in 2006 from Dhing constituency.
