= Liladhar Kotoki =

Indian politician (born 1917)

Member of Parliament, Lok Sabha
- In office 1957–1977
- Preceded by: Dev Kant Baruah
- Succeeded by: Dev Kant Baruah
- Constituency: Nowgong, Assam

Personal details
- Born: 1 December 1917 Juria, Nowgong, Assam, British India
- Party: Indian National Congress
- Spouse: Jyotirmoyee Kotoki
- Children: 2 Sons and 1 Daughter

Liladhar Kotoki (born 1 December 1917) was an Indian politician. He was elected to the Lok Sabha, lower house of the Parliament of India from Nowgong, Assam in 1957, 1962, 1967, and 1971 as a member of the Indian National Congress.
