= Rajen Gohain =

Indian politician

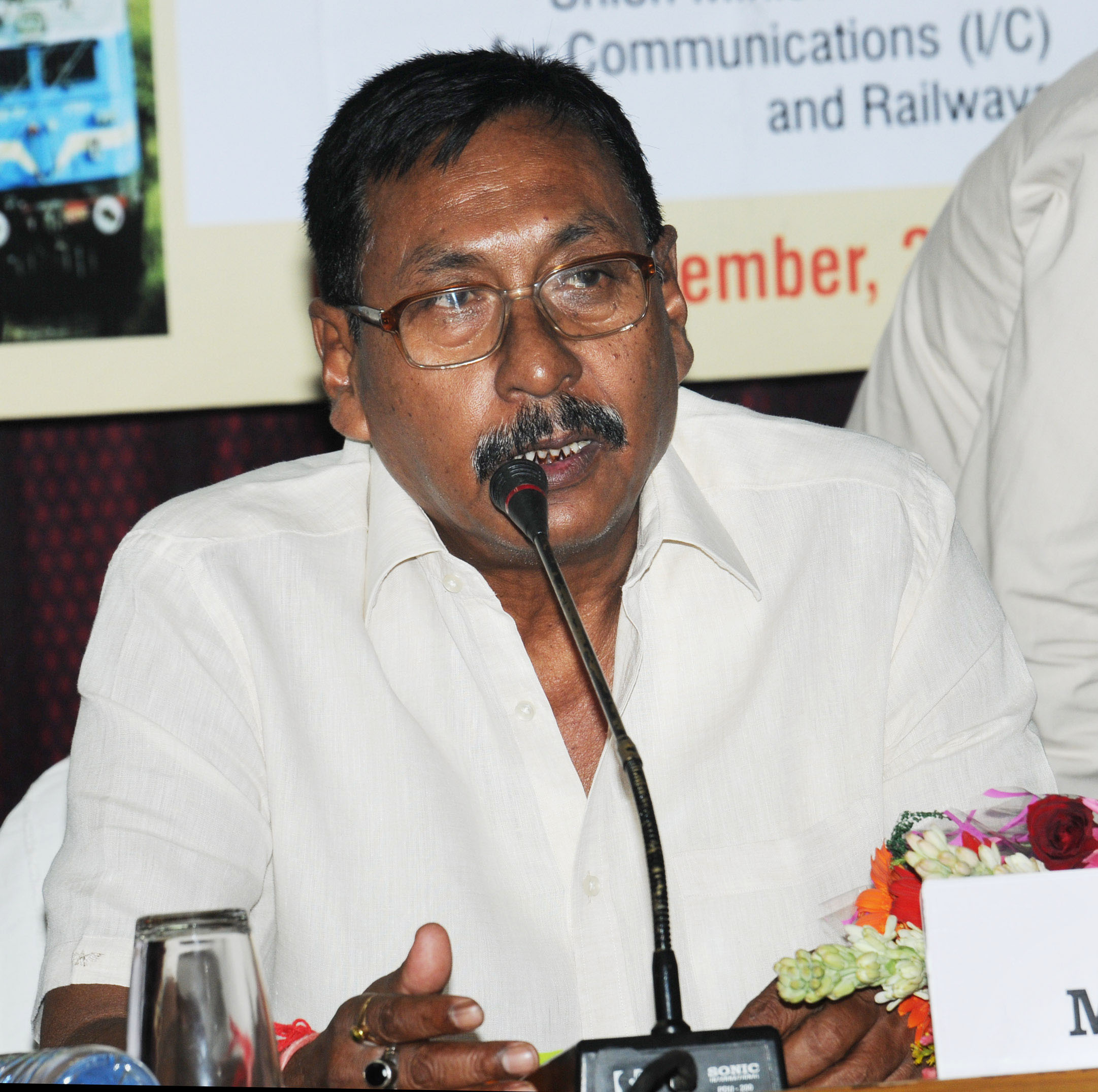

Minister of state for Railways
- In office 5 July 2016 – 30 May 2019
- Prime Minister: Narendra Modi
- Minister: Suresh Prabhu; Piyush Goyal

Member of Parliament, Lok Sabha
- In office 6 October 1999 – 24 May 2019
- Preceded by: Nripen Goswami
- Succeeded by: Pradyut Bordoloi
- Constituency: Nowgong

Personal details
- Born: 26 November 1950 (age 75) Nagaon, Assam
- Party: Assam Jatiya Parishad
- Spouse: Rita Gohain (m. 1981)
- Children: 2 sons & 3 daughters
- Parents: Shambhunath Gohain (father); Sunmai Gabharu (mother)
- Education: B. A., LLB
- Alma mater: Guwahati University

Rajen Gohain (born 26 November 1950 in Nagaon, Assam) is an Indian politician who served as a Member of parliament, Lok Sabha. He has represented the Nowgong constituency in Assam from 1999 to 2019 and was a member of the Bharatiya Janata Party.

== Background ==
Gohain was educated at the University of Guwahati and graduated with BA and LLB degrees. He married Rita Gohain in 1981. They have five children. Gohain is a tea-estate owner by profession.

== Political career ==
Gohain has served four terms as a Member of parliament, Lok Sabha. He has represented the Nowgong constituency since 1999 – having been re-elected in 2004, 2009 and 2014. Gohain has been a member of the Bharatiya Janata Party since 1991.

On 5 July 2016, Gohain was inducted to the Union Cabinet as a Minister of State in the Railway Ministry.

He joined Assam Jatiya Parishad just before Assam Assembly election 2026 and contested on Barhampur assembly constituency but lost to Jitu Goswami of BJP by over 190k(1.9 Lakh votes)
