= K. L. Shrimali =

Indian politician (1909–2000)

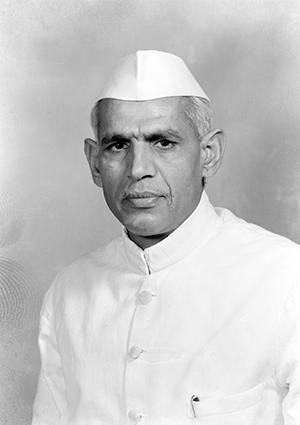

Union Minister of Education
- In office 22 February 1958 – 31 August 1963
- Prime Minister: Jawaharlal Nehru
- Preceded by: Maulana Azad
- Succeeded by: Humayun Kabir

Member of Parliament, Rajya Sabha
- In office April 1952 – April 1962
- Constituency: Rajasthan

Vice-Chancellor of Banaras Hindu University
- In office 1 November 1969 – 31 January 1977
- Appointed by: V. V. Giri
- Preceded by: A C Joshi
- Succeeded by: Moti Lal Dhar

Personal details
- Born: December 1909 Udaipur, Rajasthan, British India
- Died: 5 January 2000 (aged 90) Udaipur, Rajasthan, India
- Awards: Padma Vibhushan (1976)

Kalu Lal Shrimali (December 1909 – 5 January 2000) was an Indian parliamentarian, educationist, and author, who served as the 2nd Union Minister of Education for Government of India.

== Early life ==
He was born in December 1909 at Udaipur and had his education at Banaras Hindu University, Calcutta University, and Columbia University.

== Career ==
He served as Minister of Education in the Union Council of Ministers from May 1955 to August 1963. Shrimali represented the State of Rajasthan in Rajya Sabha from April 1952 to April 1956 and from April 1956 to April 1962.

He was associated with several educational and various social welfare organizations. Shrimali was editor of Jan Shikshan, a monthly educational magazine, and had several publications to his credit. He was one of the founders of the famous Vidya Bhawan School, located in Udaipur, which was established in Baden Powell's Boy Scout Movement. He was awarded Padma Vibhushan in 1976 for his contribution to education.

He died on 5 January 2000 at the age of 90 in Udaipur, Rajasthan.
