= Nripen Goswami =

Indian politician

Member of Parliament, Lok Sabha
- In office 1998-1999
- Preceded by: Muhi Ram Saikia
- Succeeded by: Rajen Gohain
- Constituency: Nowgong, Assam

Personal details
- Born: 18 September 1942 (age 83) Kampur, Nagaon, Assam, British India
- Party: Indian National Congress
- Spouse: Arti Goswami
- Children: One son and one daughter

Nripen Goswami is an Indian politician. He was elected to the Lok Sabha, lower house of the Parliament of India from Nowgong, Assam in 1998 as a member of the Indian National Congress.
