= Nagaon Lok Sabha constituency =

Lok Sabha constituency in Assam

Coordinates: 26.35°N 92.69°E

Nagaon AS-9
- Lok Sabha constituency
- Interactive Map Outlining Nagaon Lok Sabha constituency

Constituency details
- Country: India
- Region: Northeast India
- State: Assam
- Assembly constituencies: Jagiroad; Morigaon; Laharighat; Raha; Nagaon–Batadraba; Dhing; Rupahihat; Samaguri
- Established: 1952
- Total electors: 18,17,204
- Reservation: None

Member of Parliament
- 18th Lok Sabha
- Incumbent Devasish Sharma
- Party: BJP
- Alliance: NDA
- Elected year: 2026

Nagaon Lok Sabha Constituency is one of the 14 Lok Sabha constituencies in Assam in India.

== Assembly Segments ==
Nagaon Lok Sabha constituency is composed of the following assembly segments:

No.	Name	Reserved for (SC/ST/None)	District	Member	Party	2026 Lead
52	Jagiroad	SC	Morigaon	Pijush Hazarika	BJP	BJP
53	Laharighat	None	Morigaon	Asif Mohammad Nazar	INC	AIUDF
54	Morigaon	None	Morigaon	Rama Kanta Dewri	BJP	BJP
55	Dhing	None	Nagaon	Mehboob Muktar	RD	AIUDF
56	Rupahihat	None	Nagaon	Nurul Huda	INC	AIUDF
58	Samaguri	None	Nagaon	Tanzil Hussain	INC	AIUDF
60	Nagaon–Batadraba	None	Nagaon	Rupak Sarmah	BJP	BJP
61	Raha	SC	Nagaon	Sashi Kanta Das	BJP	BJP

== Members of Parliament ==
Year	Winner	Party
1952	Dev Kant Baruah	Indian National Congress
1957	Liladhar Kotoki	Indian National Congress
1962	Liladhar Kotoki	Indian National Congress
1967	Liladhar Kotoki	Indian National Congress
1971	Liladhar Kotoki	Indian National Congress
1977	Dev Kant Baruah	Indian National Congress
1984	Muhi Ram Saikia	Asom Gana Parishad
1991	Muhi Ram Saikia	Asom Gana Parishad
1996	Muhi Ram Saikia	Asom Gana Parishad
1998	Nripen Goswami	Indian National Congress
1999	Rajen Gohain	Bharatiya Janata Party
2004	Rajen Gohain	Bharatiya Janata Party
2009	Rajen Gohain	Bharatiya Janata Party
2014	Rajen Gohain	Bharatiya Janata Party
2019	Pradyut Bordoloi	Indian National Congress
2024	Pradyut Bordoloi	Indian National Congress
2026^	Devasish Sharma	Bharatiya Janata Party

^ indicates bypolls.

== Election results ==
=== 2026 by-election ===
2026 Nagaon by-election: Nagaon
Party	Candidate	Votes	%	±%
BJP	Devasish Sharma	714,349	49.12	▲11.92
AIUDF	Badruddin Ajmal	572,125	39.34	▲30.48
INC	Sibamoni Bora	129,492	8.90	▼41.99
NOTA	None of the above	9,244	0.64	▼0.13
Majority		142,224	9.78	▼3.91
Turnout		1,454,380	76.19	▼8.96
Registered electors		1,817,204		
BJP gain from INC		Swing		

=== General elections 2024 ===
2024 Indian general election: Nagaon
Party	Candidate	Votes	%	±%
INC	Pradyut Bordoloi	788,850	50.89	▲1.36
BJP	Suresh Borah	576,619	37.20	▼11.20
AIUDF	Aminul Islam	137,340	8.86	N/A
NOTA	None of the Above	11,995	0.77	▲0.05
Majority		212,231	13.69	▲12.56
Turnout		1,550,628	85.15	▲1.93
INC hold		Swing	−4.92 (Note: Two-party swing)	

=== General elections 2019 ===
2019 Indian general elections: Nowgong
Party	Candidate	Votes	%	±%
INC	Pradyut Bordoloi	739,724	49.53	+21.04
BJP	Rupak Sarmah	7,22,972	48.40	+8.24
AITC	Sahadev Das	5,875	0.39	−0.17
NOTA	None of the above	10,757	0.72	+0.01
Majority		16,752	1.13	−10.54
Turnout		14,93,475	83.22	+2.47
Registered electors		17,94,648		
INC gain from BJP		Swing	+1.35 (Note: One-party swing)	

=== General elections 2014 ===
2014 Indian general elections: Nowgong
Party	Candidate	Votes	%	±%
BJP	Rajen Gohain	494,146	40.16	+2.10
INC	Jonjonali Baruah	3,50,587	28.49	−5.08
AIUDF	Dr. Aditya Langthasa	3,14,012	25.52	+0.99
AGP	Mridula Barkakoty	35,142	2.86	+2.86
Independent	Faruk Hazarika	11,325	0.92	+0.92
AITC	Dipak Kumar Borah	6,835	0.56	+0.56
Independent	Selima Sultana	6,462	0.53	+0.53
AIFB	Rafiqul Islam	2,783	0.23	−0.20
NOTA	None of the above	8,782	0.71	
Majority		1,43,559	11.67	+7.13
Turnout		12,30,495	80.75	+9.90
BJP hold		Swing	−1.49 (Note: Two-party swing)	

=== General elections 2009 ===
2009 Indian general elections: Nowgong
Party	Candidate	Votes	%	±%
BJP	Rajen Gohain	380,921	38.06	−5.54
INC	Anil Raja	3,35,541	33.53	−6.07
AIUDF	Sirajuddin Ajmal	2,45,155	24.50	New
Majority		45,380	4.54	+0.54
Turnout		9,99,926	70.85	+2.45
BJP hold		Swing		

=== General elections 2004 ===
2004 Indian general elections: Nowgong
Party	Candidate	Votes	%	±%
BJP	Rajen Gohain	342,704	43.60	+0.43
INC	Bishnu Prasad	3,11,292	39.60	+1.08
AGP	Dhruba Kumar Saikia	1,04,273	13.26	−0.33
UMFA	Haji Abdur Rouf	11,585	1.47	−0.29
RPI	Bhupen Chandra Mudoi	10,599	1.35	New
SAP	Biren Chandra Das	5,616	0.71	+0.35
Majority		31,412	4.00	−0.65
Turnout		7,86,069	68.40	−1.76
BJP hold		Swing		

=== General elections 1999 ===
1999 Indian general election: Nowgong
Party	Candidate	Votes	%	±%
BJP	Rajen Gohain	328,861	43.17	+7.02
INC	Nripen Goswami	2,93,433	38.52	−2.58
AGP	Muhi Ram Saikia	1,03,497	13.59	−3.24
Independent	Rimal Amsih	16,907	2.22	New
UMFA	Hafiz Rashid Ahmed Choudhury	13,405	1.76	New
SAP	Mustafa Kamal Passa	2,760	0.36	−1.44
Independent	Dharmeswar Borah	1,815	0.24	+0.18
AJBP	Santosh Kumar Deb	1,020	0.13	New
Majority		35,428	4.65	−0.30
Turnout		7,61,698	70.16	+10.74
BJP gain from INC		Swing	+2.07 (Note: One-party swing)	

=== General elections 1998 ===
1998 Indian general election: Nowgong
Party	Candidate	Votes	%	±%
INC	Nripen Goswami	267,448	41.10	
BJP	Rajen Gohain	2,29,664	36.15	
AGP	Joyasree Goswami Mahanta	1,06,935	16.83	
Independent	Aditya Khakhlari	16,531	2.26	
SAP	Tafazzui Hussain	11,455	1.80	
Independent	Kandarpa Saikia	1,440	0.23	
Independent	Ananta Bordoloi	1,414	0.22	
Independent	Dharmeshwar Borah	364	0.06	
Majority		37,784	4.95	
Turnout		6,35,251	59.42	
INC gain from AGP		Swing		

== See also ==
- Nowgong
- List of constituencies of the Lok Sabha
