= Muhi Ram Saikia =

Indian politician

Union Minister of State for Human Resource Development (Department of Education)
- In office 29 June 1996 – 19 March 1998 Serving with R. Dhanuskodi Athithan
- Prime Minister: H. D. Deve Gowda; Inder Kumar Gujral
- Minister: S. R. Bommai
- Preceded by: Kanti Singh
- Succeeded by: Uma Bharti

Member of Parliament, Lok Sabha
- In office 29 December 1984 – 1 March 1998
- Preceded by: D. K. Barooah
- Succeeded by: Nripen Goswami
- Constituency: Nowgong

Personal details
- Born: 15 April 1923 Bhatiapar, Sibsagar, Assam, British India
- Died: 1 February 2007 (aged 83)
- Party: Asom Gana Parishad
- Spouse: Kanaklata Saikia
- Children: One son and four daughters

Muhi Ram Saikia (15 April 1923 – 1 February 2007) was an Indian politician from Assam. He was elected to the Lok Sabha, lower house of the Parliament of India from the Nowgong constituency, Assam in 1991, 1996 and 1998 as a member of the Asom Gana Parishad. He was the Union Minister of State for Human Resources Development in the United Front governments headed by H. D. Deve Gowda and Inder Kumar Gujral. Prior to joining politics, he was an educator and served as the principal of Nowgong College for fifteen years. Saikia died in February 2007.
