= Mehboob Muktar =

Indian politician (born 1978)

Member of the Assam Legislative Assembly
- Incumbent
- Assumed office 2026
- Preceded by: Aminul Islam
- Constituency: Dhing

Personal details
- Born: 1978 (age 47–48) Dhing, Nagaon district, Assam, India
- Party: Raijor Dal
- Education: B.A.
- Occupation: Politician

Mehboob Muktar (born 1978) is an Indian politician from the northeastern state of Assam. He is a member of the Assam Legislative Assembly from the Dhing Assembly constituency in Nagaon district representing the Raijor Dal, which contested the 2026 Assembly election in alliance with the Indian National Congress and other parties under the banner of Asom Sonmilito Morcha.

== Early life and education ==
Muktar is from Dhing in Nagaon district, Assam. He is the son of the late Gias Uddin Muktar. He completed his Bachelor of Arts degree in 2005. Before the 2021 and 2026 elections, he declared assets worth ₹1 crore in his affidavit submitted to the Election Commission of India.

== Career ==
Muktar won the Dhing Assembly constituency representing the Raijor Dal in the 2026 Assam Legislative Assembly election. He polled 1,31,182 votes and defeated Matiur Rahman of the All India United Democratic Front by a margin of 71,494 votes. In the 2021 Assam Legislative Assembly election, he contested as an independent candidate and finished second with 42,921 votes behind winner Aminul Islam of the All India United Democratic Front.
