= Radhakishan Malviya =

Indian politician (1943–2013)

Member of Parliament, Rajya Sabha
- In office 1982–2000
- Constituency: Madhya Pradesh

Member of Madhya Pradesh Legislative Assembly
- In office 1972–1977
- Preceded by: Babulal Rathore
- Succeeded by: Arjun Singh Dharu
- Constituency: Sanwer

Personal details
- Born: 8 July 1943 Bicholi Hapsi, Indore District, British India
- Died: 19 February 2013 (aged 69)
- Party: Indian National Congress
- Parent: Chhotelal Malviya (father)
- Education: B.A. LLB
- Profession: Farmer, politician

Radhakishan Malviya was an Indian politician. He was a member of parliament representing Madhya Pradesh in the Rajya Sabha the upper house of India's Parliament as member of the Indian National Congress.

== Political career ==
He was a prominent Dalit face of MP Congress. Labour and Parliamentary Affairs minister in Rajiv Gandhi ministry, Member of Parliament for consecutive 18 years, Chairman of Parliament Housing Committee, President of Madhya Pradesh Congress Committee for two terms, President of All India Harijan Sewak Sangh New Delhi which was formed by Mahatma Gandhi, MLA from Sanwer constituency and President of Indore District Congress Committee for 14 years.

== Personal life ==
Radhakishan Malviya's son Rajendra Malviya, Working Chairman of MP Congress Sc. Department, Chairman Madhya Pradesh Harijan Sewak Sangh, Ex General Secretary of MP Congress and Zila Panchayat Member. He was Congress Candidate from Dewas loksabha in 2024 General election. He was MLA candidate from Tarana constituency in 2013. Malviya's grandson vishal is currently the youngest member of Janpad Panchayat Indore and also the Chairman of Indore Janpad Agricultural committee
