= Bharat Vikas Morcha =

Political party of India

Bharat Vikas Morcha ('India Development Front') is a political party in the Indian state of Bihar. The party is aligned with Babulal Marandi, former Chief Minister of Jharkhand. As of 2010 the general secretary of the party was Vijay Kumar Mishra.
