= K. K. Tewary =

Indian politician

K. K. Tewary (born 1942) was an Indian Parliamentarian and Union Minister in former Prime Minister Rajiv Gandhi's Union Council of Ministers. He was elected twice in 1980 and 1984 from Buxar Lok Sabha Constituency.
