= Sushila Rohatgi =

Indian politician (1921–2011)

Sushila Rohatgi (21 August 1921 – 9 April 2011) was a leader of Indian National Congress. She was a union minister of India. She was a great-granddaughter of Madan Mohan Malviya and was elected to Lok Sabha from Uttar Pradesh twice and was also elected to Rajya Sabha in 1985.

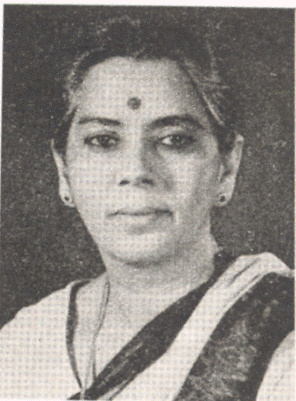
