= Gioconda Vessichelli =

Italian opera singer

- Origin: Rome, Italy
- Genres: Opera, Pop music, fusion, Bollywood
- Occupations: Singer, composer, lyricist, director, actress

Gioconda Vessichelli is an Italian opera singer and actress.

== Life and career ==
Vessichelli is the creator and pioneer of a musical style she calls "BollywoOPERA," combining Western classical opera with Bollywood melodies, the first time ever in the world. She has two degrees from the "Conservatorio di Santa Cecilia - University of Music" - Rome. She collaborates only with the legends of Indian music. She sang in the 2026 film Cocktail 2, with music by the biggest composer of BollywoodPritam, and in the 2025 Assamese film Roi Roi Binale, alongside the legendary singer of AssamZubeen Garg. She also sang in the Bollywood film Prague (2013) and she gave her voice for hit Bollywood movie "Marikom" along with Vishal Dadlani in the song "Zidd dill".After that she released her solo songs albums for the biggest labels of India Tseries and Zee Music. In 2024 she collaborated with the biggest Sufi singer of the world Rahat Fateh Ali Khan on "Mohabbat Kya Hai," blending qawwali and opera, released by Orchard/Sony. In 2014, she released "Thodi Daaru," featuring Mika Singh. In 2025, she released "Tiki Tiki," a song she wrote and composed in English, Spanish, and Hindi, distributed by Believe France.

Vessichelli has performed alongside a number of Indian musicians, including Sukhwinder Singh, Rahat Fateh Ali Khan, Mika Singh, Niladri Kumar, Asha Bhosle, Pritam, Zubeen Garg, Nilotpal Bora, Anup Jalota, and Zakir Hussain, Loy Mendosa, Gino Banks at venues including the Nehru Centre and the Lavasa Festival, Chicago Zee tv, Santa Cecilia Auditorium in Rome. Gioconda Vessichelli 's song "Der se Aana" hit 10 millions views in youtube, its remake being arranged by the Grammy award winner programmer Giampaolo Pasquile in Uk. She served as an international judge for "The Queen of Mashups" alongside Amruta Fadnavis and in the jury of Miss India in Pune where she also performed the song "Pyar Hua iqrar" recreated by her in BollywoOpera style. In December 2017, she judged the Zee TV International Indian Icon competition in Chicago alongside Bappi Lahiri and Meenakshi Seshadri. That December she also judged Mood Indigo alongside Amit Trivedi. In January 2018, she gave a lecture on music and performance technique at Subhash Ghai's Whistling Woods International, together with singer Ankit Tiwari.

She appears in the 2005 annual directory of Italian opera singers for performing in the first contemporary-opera production at the Teatro Comunale di Modena, broadcast on RAI radio. She sang in the premiere of Matteo D'Amico's contemporary opera Lavinia fuggita. She was named best singer at the Accademia Rossiniana in Pesaro and debuted the role of Madama Cortese in Rossini's Il viaggio a Reims with the ROF symphonic orchestra at the Rossini theatre. She later sang in Rossini's Il barbiere di Siviglia during an international opera season in Ercolano and in the Teatro Politeama opera season in Lecce. She also performed the role of Carmen in Bizet's opera. She also interpreted the role of "Mimi" in Puccini's La Bohème. She also performed the role of Carmen in Bizet's opera.

In 2007, she was invited to the Venice Awards to sing for composer Ennio Morricone, with the event broadcast on RAI.

She worked with director Lindsay Kemp and conductor David Haughton on Benjamin Britten's A Midsummer Night's Dream at Teatro del Giglio in Lucca, and later at Teatro Verdi in Pisa and Teatro Goldoni in Livorno. She has also worked with conductor Antonio Pappano of the Orchestra dell'Accademia Nazionale di Santa Cecilia in Rome.

She is regularly invited to teach artistic fusion at universities around the world, including Subhash Ghai’s Fifth Veda University of Performing Arts in Mumbai, among many others. Her work includes acting, directing and classical opera, and she is the recipient of seven international awards. She has collaborated with numerous internationally acclaimed artists, some of them Grammy Award winners, including Ennio Morricone, Dario Fo, Katia Ricciarelli, Lindsay Kemp and Luciano Pavarotti. Her work has encompassed both the development of creative concepts – such as the “Federico II” festival, for which she also served as artistic director – and co-direction. She is invited worldwide as an inspirational director, speaker, moderator and keynote presenter, thanks to her broad, unconventional and eclectic cultural background. This is rooted not only in her two degrees, both awarded with highest honours, but also in her extensive travels across the globe, encompassing 160 countries. She sang and directed in a production of Tosca at the "Quattro Notti" international festival in Benevento, and the following year made her acting debut at the same festival in Lehár's La vedova allegra. She performed alongside soprano Katia Ricciarelli in Orfeo all'inferno by Offenbach at Teatro Lirico di Cagliari, and in a Christmas concert with violinist Uto Ughi and actor Michele Placido.

She performed a concert of Puccini love arias devoted to women, and gave a benefit concert for AIDS research in French Polynesia, broadcast on radio. She also performed at the Santa Cecilia Auditorium in Rome with jazz musician Renzo Arbore and conductor Antonio Pappano.

She appeared as a dancer, alongside Mika Singh and Millind Gaba, in Dilbagh Singh's video "Bottoms Up," released in April 2015. She sings in twelve languages, including Italian, English, Hindi, and French.

== Television ==
Show	Network	Year
Mika Di Vohti	Star Bharat	2022
I Am Not Done Yet (Kapil Sharma's comedy show)	Netflix	2022
Diario	ABC TV	2022
Bruno Masi show	BM TV	2022
Radio interview about BollywoOPERA	Ñanduti	2022
Judge, International Indian Icon (3iii)	Zee TV	2017
Hang Out (interview)	B4U	2014
Venice Awards broadcast	RAI 2	2007

== Roles ==
Year	Work	Role
2025	Roi Roi Binale	Queen of Opera
2020	Die Zauberflöte	Pamina
2019	Le nozze di Figaro	Susanna
2018	Faust	Marguerite
2017	Le siège de Corinthe	Pamira
2016	Pagliacci	Nedda
2015	Turandot	Liù
2014	Madama Butterfly	Cio-Cio-San
2013	La forza del destino	Leonora
2012	La traviata	Violetta
2011	Carmen	Micaela
2010	Tosca	Floria
2009	La bohème	Mimì
2008	La vedova allegra	Anna Glavari
2007	Orfeo all'inferno	Giunone
2006	Il barbiere di Siviglia	Berta
2005	Così fan tutte	Fiordiligi
2004	Il viaggio a Reims	Madama Cortese
2004	Lavinia fuggita	Angelica
2003	A Midsummer Night's Dream	Helena

== Selected discography ==
Year	Title	Notes
2025	"Roi Roi Binale"	with Zubeen Garg; Sony Music
2025	"Mohabbat Kya Hai"	with Rahat Fateh Ali Khan; Sony Music
2025	"Tiki Tiki"	Believe France
2024	"Hum Sab Ek"	with Anup Jalota
2024	"Ziddi Dil" (Mary Kom)	with Vishal Dadlani; Zee Music
2019	"Contigo Bom Bom"	Music and Sound
2018	"That's Amore"	T-Series
2017	"Itni Si Baat Hai"	T-Series
2014	"Thodi Daaru"	with Mika Singh

== Filmography (as singer) ==
- 2014 — Mary Kom ("Ziddi Dil"), Zee Music
- 2013 — Prague ("Touch Opera"), Universal
- 2015 — Kahin Toh Hoga ("Rabba"), music director Raaj Aashoo
- 2025 — Roi Roi Binale, with Zubeen Garg
- 2026 — Cocktail 2, music by Pritam, Universal

== Awards and honours ==
She has won seven international opera vocal competitions: Mario Lanza 2001; Albanese 2002; Napolinova 1999; Alaleona 2000; Cagli 2005;Anemos (1998), Napolinova (1999), and the Leoncavallo competition (2013).; in August 2004 she wins the International ROF Rossini Opera Festival in Pesaro (leading her to sing in the main role of Madama Cortese in all the shows of that Opera season of "Il Viaggio a Reims"); Rosetum-Scala international opera competition.

== Writer, Director, Inspiring Speaker ==
Gioconda Vessichelli has written and directed La vedova allegra.. Anna debuting in Sannio festival 4 notti e più di Luna piena. She has written lyrics to numerous songs in 5 languages: Italian, Spanish, English, French, Portuguese (many of them released by the Indian biggest label, Tseries). She has won a poetry competition for Unicef with the poem "Negretto negrettino". She has written and codirected with the famous ltalian director Mauro Russo "Contigo Bom Bom". She is specialised in writing concepts and creative content also for State Italian Television RAl, as she has 2 degrees with maximum marks from the University of Performina Arts "Santa Cecilia" of Rome (Italy and she is invited for teaching in workshops in prestigious Universities all over the world, like recently in Subhash Ghai's University In Mumba "Fifth Veda", (53 (he is a 360 degrees artist: in fact she is actress, 'director and 7 international opera award singer too, and she has been collaborating with grammy award winner artists like Ennio Morricone, directors Dario Fo, Katia Ricciarelli, Lisday Kemp, Luciano Pavarotti, Mauro Russo to name a few.
