= 2024 Indian general election in Assam =

Lok Sabha election in Assam

- 19 April- 7 May 2024

All 14 Assam seats in the Lok Sabha
- Opinion polls
- Registered: 24,572,114
- Turnout: 81.87% (▲0.27%)
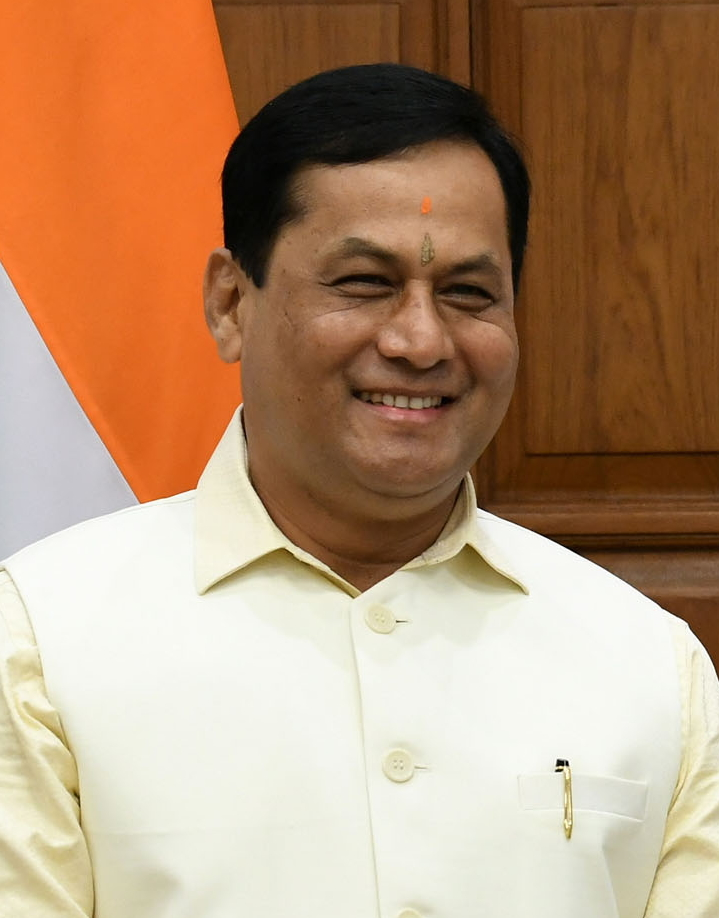

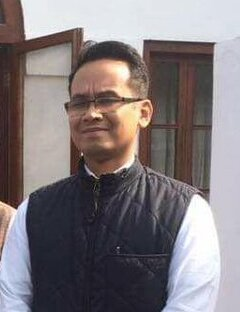
| Leader | Sarbananda Sonowal | Gaurav Gogoi |
| Alliance | NDA | INDIA |
| Leader since | 2018 | 2020 |
| Leader's seat | Dibrugarh (won) | Jorhat (won) |
| Last election | 36.41%, 9 seats | 35.79%, 3 seats |
| Seats won | 11 | 3 |
| Seat change | ▲2 | Steady |
| Popular vote | 92,96,806 | 79,24,804 |
| Percentage | 46.91% | 39.98% |
| Swing | ▲10.86% | ▲2.04% |
- Results of the 2024 Indian general election in Assam
Prime Minister before election
Narendra Modi
BJP
Prime Minister after election
Narendra Modi
BJP

The 2024 Indian general election in Assam was held from 19 April to 7 May 2024, to elect 14 members from the state to the 18th Lok Sabha.

== Election schedule ==
| Poll event | Phase | | |
|---|---|---|---|
| Poll event | I | II | III |
| Notification date | 20 March | 28 March | 12 April |
| Last date for filing nomination | 27 March | 4 April | 19 April |
| Scrutiny of nomination | 28 March | 5 April | 20 April |
| Last Date for withdrawal of nomination | 30 March | 8 April | 22 April |
| Date of poll | 19 April | 26 April | 7 May |
| Date of counting of votes/Result | 4 June 2024 | | |
| No. of constituencies | 5 | 5 | 4 |

== Parties and alliances ==
=== National Democratic Alliance ===
National Democratic Alliance

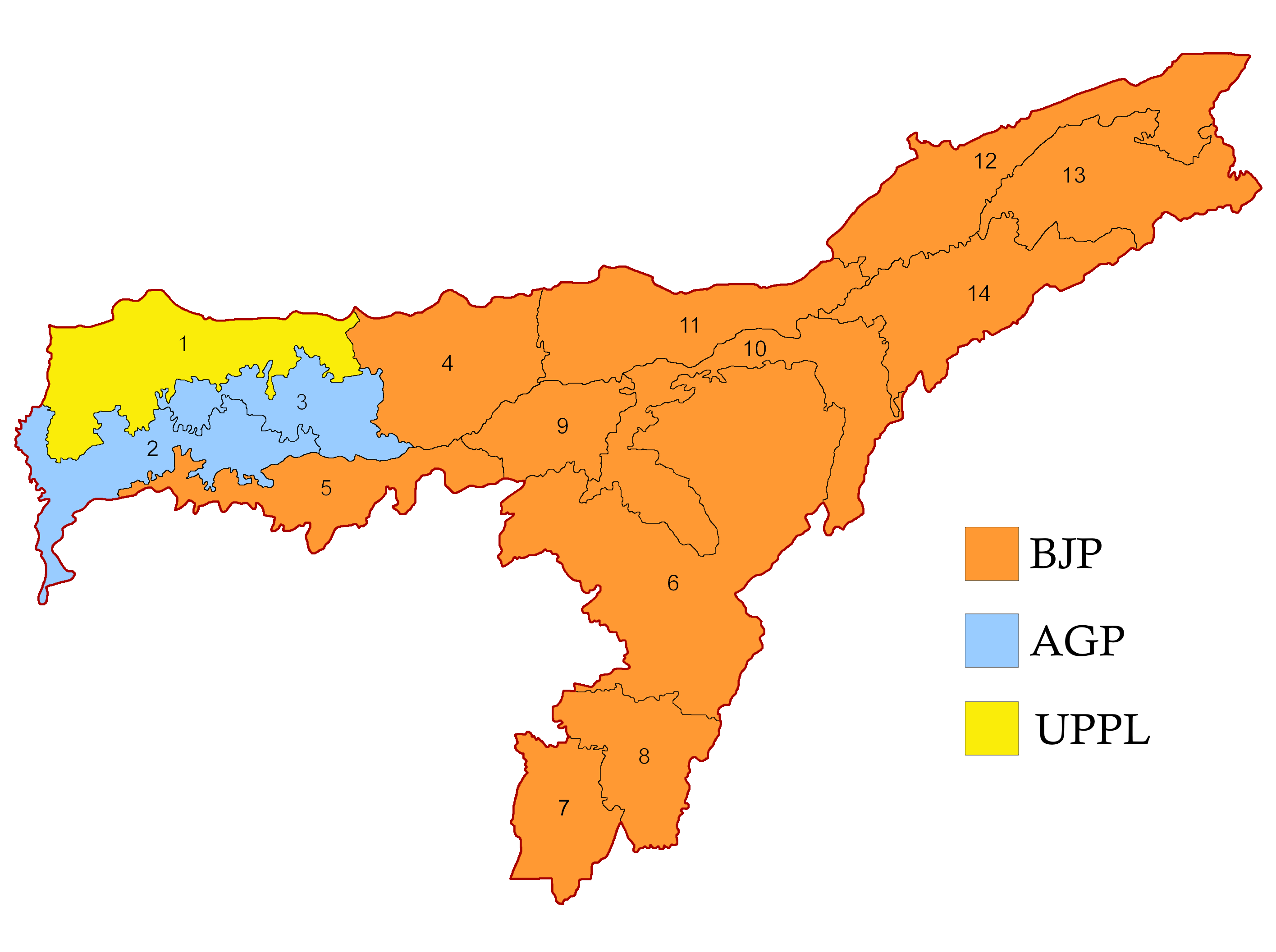

| Party | Flag | Symbol | Leader | Seats contested |
|---|---|---|---|---|
| Bharatiya Janata Party | | | Sarbananda Sonowal | 11 |
| Asom Gana Parishad | | | Atul Bora | 2 |
| United People's Party Liberal | | | Urkhao Gwra Brahma | 1 |
| Total | | | | 14 |

=== Indian National Developmental Inclusive Alliance ===
Indian National Developmental Inclusive Alliance

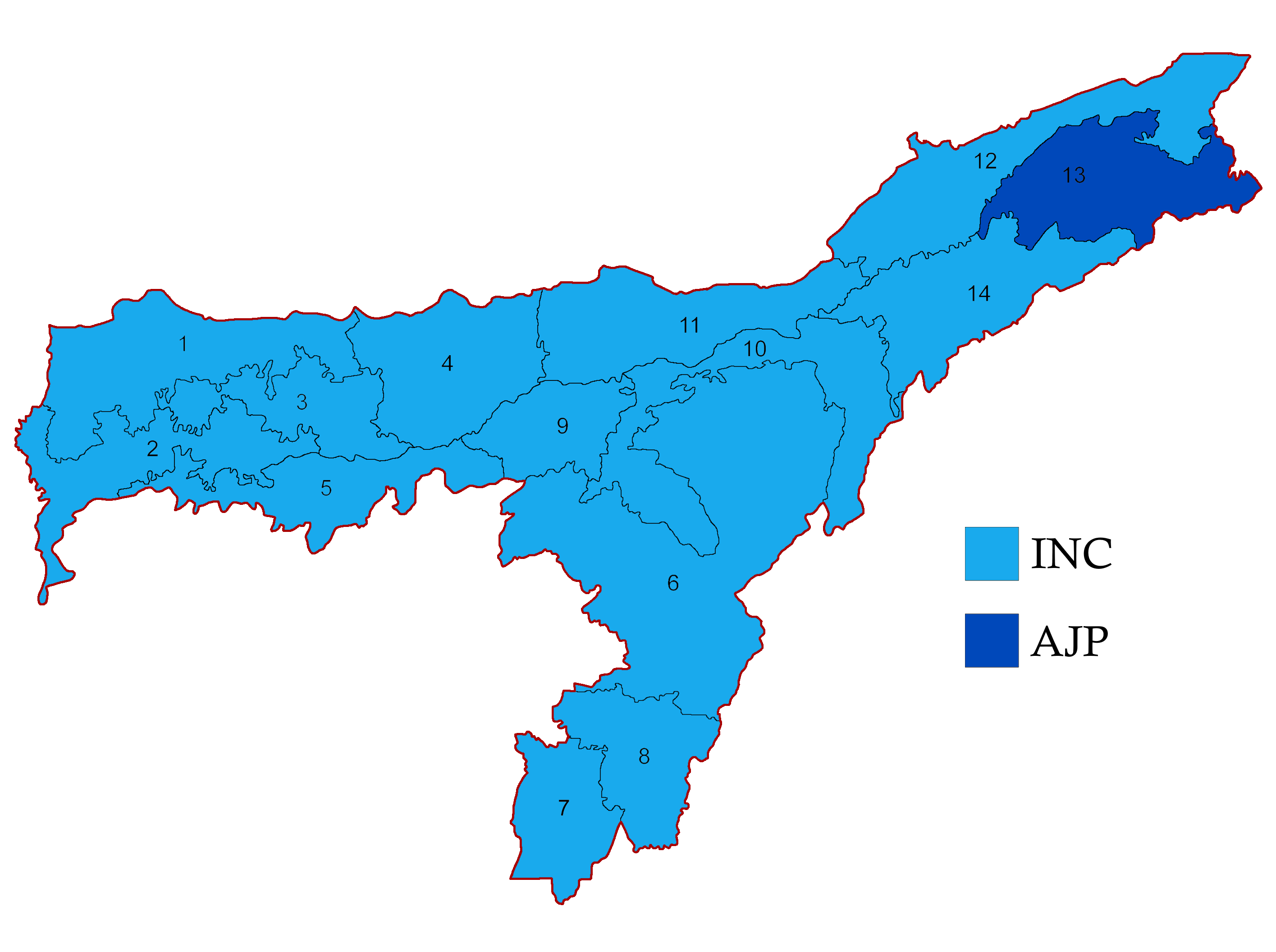

| Party | Flag | Symbol | Leader | Seats contested |
|---|---|---|---|---|
| Indian National Congress | | | Gourav Gogoi | 13 |
| Assam Jatiya Parishad | | | Lurinjyoti Gogoi | 1 |
| Total | | | | 14 |

=== Others ===
Recognised parties
| Party | Flag | Symbol | Leader | Seats contested |
|---|---|---|---|---|
| Bodoland People's Front | | | Hagrama Mohilary | 4 |
| All India Trinamool Congress | | | Ripun Bora | 4 |
| All India United Democratic Front | | | Badruddin Ajmal | 3 |
| Aam Aadmi Party | | | Bhaben Choudhury | 2 |
| Communist Party of India (Marxist) | | | Suprakash Talukdar | 1 |
| Communist Party of India | | | Kanak Gogoi | 1 |
| Total | | | | 15 |

Unrecognised parties
| Party | Leader | Symbol | Seats contested |
|---|---|---|---|
| Voters Party International | | | 8 |
| Bharatiya Gana Parishad | | | 6 |
| Socialist Unity Centre of India (Communist) | Chandralekha Das | | 6 |
| Gana Suraksha Party | Heera Saraniya | | 4 |
| Rashtriya Ulama Council | | | 4 |
| Republican Party of India (Athawale) | | | 4 |
| Asom Jana Morcha | | | 3 |
| Bahujan Maha Party | | | 3 |
| Bangali Nabanirman Sena | | | 2 |
| Ekam Sanatan Bharat Dal | | | 2 |
| Autonomous State Demand Committee | Jayanta Rongpi | | 1 |
| Bharatheeya Jawan Kisan Party | | | 1 |
| Hindu Samaj Party | | | 1 |
| Jai Prakash Janata Dal | | | 1 |
| The National Road Map Party of India | | | 1 |
| Total | | | 47 |

== Candidates ==
| Constituency | | NDA | | INDIA | | Others | |
| No. | Name | Party | Candidate | Party | Candidate | Party | Candidate |
|---|---|---|---|---|---|---|---|
| 1 | Kokrajhar (ST) | UPPL | Joyanta Basumatary | INC | Garjan Mushahary | AITC | Gauri Shankar Sarania |
| 1 | Kokrajhar (ST) | UPPL | Joyanta Basumatary | INC | Garjan Mushahary | BPF | Kampa Borgoyari |
| 2 | Dhubri | AGP | Zabed Islam | INC | Rakibul Hussain | AIUDF | Badruddin Ajmal |
| 3 | Barpeta | AGP | Phani Bhusan Choudhury | INC | Deep Bayan | AITC | Abul Kalam Azad |
| 3 | Barpeta | AGP | Phani Bhusan Choudhury | INC | Deep Bayan | CPI(M) | Manoranjan Talukdar |
| 4 | Darrang–Udalguri | BJP | Dilip Saikia | INC | Madhab Rajbangshi | BPF | Durga Das Boro |
| 5 | Guwahati | BJP | Bijuli Kalita Medhi | INC | Mira Barthakur Goswami | ESBD | Amitabh Sharmah |
| 6 | Diphu (ST) | BJP | Amar Sing Tisso | INC | Joyram Engleng | ASDC | Jotson Bey |
| 7 | Karimganj | BJP | Kripanath Mallah | INC | Rashid Ahmed Choudhary | AIUDF | Sahabul Islam Choudhary |
| 8 | Silchar (SC) | BJP | Parimal Suklabaidya | INC | Surjya Kanta Sarkar | AITC | Radheshyam Biswas |
| 9 | Nowgong | BJP | Suresh Bora | INC | Pradyut Bordoloi | AIUDF | Aminul Islam |
| 10 | Kaziranga | BJP | Kamakhya Prasad Tasa | INC | Roselina Tirkey | RPI(A) | Salesh Ahmed Mazumdar |
| 11 | Sonitpur | BJP | Ranjit Dutta | INC | Premlal Ganju | AAP | Rishiraj Sharma |
| 11 | Sonitpur | BJP | Ranjit Dutta | INC | Premlal Ganju | BPF | Raju Deuri |
| 12 | Lakhimpur | BJP | Pradan Baruah | INC | Uday Shankar Hazarika | AITC | Ghana Kanta Chutia |
| 12 | Lakhimpur | BJP | Pradan Baruah | INC | Uday Shankar Hazarika | CPI | Dhiren Kachari |
| 13 | Dibrugarh | BJP | Sarbananda Sonowal | AJP | Lurinjyoti Gogoi | AAP | Manoj Dhanuar |
| 14 | Jorhat | BJP | Topon Kumar Gogoi | INC | Gaurav Gogoi | ESBD | Arun Chandra Handique |

== Surveys and polls ==
=== Opinion polls ===
| Polling agency | Date published | Margin of error | | | | | Lead |
| Polling agency | Date published | Margin of error | NDA | INDIA | AIUDF | Others | Lead |
| ABP News-CVoter | April 2024 | ±5% | 12 | 2 | 0 | | NDA |
| ABP News-CVoter | March 2024 | ±5% | 12 | 2 | 0 | | NDA |
| India TV-CNX | March 2024 | ±3% | 12 | 1 | 1 | | NDA |
| India Today-CVoter | February 2024 | ±3-5% | 12 | 2 | 0 | | NDA |
| Times Now-ETG | December 2023 | ±3% | 9-11 | 2-4 | 0-1 | | NDA |
| India TV-CNX | October 2023 | ±3% | 12 | 1 | 1 | | NDA |
| Times Now-ETG | September 2023 | ±3% | 7-9 | 4-6 | 0-1 | | NDA |
| Times Now-ETG | August 2023 | ±3% | 9-11 | 3-4 | 0-1 | | NDA |
| India Today-CVoter | August 2023 | ±3-5% | 12 | 1 | 1 | | NDA |

| Polling agency | Date published | Margin of error | | | | | Lead |
| Polling agency | Date published | Margin of error | NDA | INDIA | AIUDF | Others | Lead |
| ABP News-CVoter | April 2024 | ±5% | 51.8% | 35.5% | 16.3% | | 12.7 |
| ABP News-CVoter | March 2024 | ±5% | 45% | 38% | 13% | | 7 |
| India Today-CVoter | February 2024 | ±3-5% | 46% | 31% | 23% | | 15 |
| India Today-CVoter | August 2023 | ±3-5% | 48% | 36% | 16% | | 12 |

=== Exit polls ===
| Polling agency | | | | | Lead |
| Polling agency | NDA | INDIA | AIUDF | Others | Lead |
| TV9 Bharatvarsh- People's Insight - Polstrat | 12 | 1 | 0 | 1 | NDA |
| Actual results | 11 | 3 | 0 | 0 | NDA |

!Pratik - Classification !10 !4 !0 !0 |bgcolor=&#35;FF9933 |NDA |-

== Voter turnout ==
There were 24,572,114 registered voters in the state, and 19,819,569 votes were polled in the state.

=== Phase-wise ===
| Phase | Poll date | Constituencies | Voter turnout (%) |
|---|---|---|---|
| I | 19 April 2024 | Kaziranga, Sonitpur, Lakhimpur, Dibrugarh, Jorhat | 78.25% |
| II | 26 April 2024 | Darrang–Udalguri, Diphu (ST), Karimganj, Silchar (SC), Nowgong | 81.17% |
| III | 7 May 2024 | Kokrajhar (ST), Dhubri, Barpeta, Guwahati | 85.45% |
| Total | | | 81.62% |

=== Constituency-wise ===
| Constituency | | Poll date | Turnout | Swing |
|---|---|---|---|---|
| 1 | Kokrajhar (ST) | 7 May 2024 | 83.55% | 0.25% ▲ |
| 2 | Dhubri | 7 May 2024 | 92.08% | 1.42% ▲ |
| 3 | Barpeta | 7 May 2024 | 85.24% | 1.33% ▼ |
| 4 | Darrang–Udalguri | 26 April 2024 | 82.01% | New |
| 5 | Guwahati | 7 May 2024 | 78.39% | 2.48% ▼ |
| 6 | Diphu (ST) | 26 April 2024 | 75.74% | 1.89% ▼ |
| 7 | Karimganj | 26 April 2024 | 80.48% | 1.30% ▲ |
| 8 | Silchar (SC) | 26 April 2024 | 79.05% | 0.46% ▼ |
| 9 | Nowgong | 26 April 2024 | 84.97% | 1.74% ▲ |
| 10 | Kaziranga | 19 April 2024 | 79.33% | New |
| 11 | Sonitpur | 19 April 2024 | 78.46% | New |
| 12 | Lakhimpur | 19 April 2024 | 76.42% | 1.25% ▲ |
| 13 | Dibrugarh | 19 April 2024 | 76.75% | 0.55% ▼ |
| 14 | Jorhat | 19 April 2024 | 79.89% | 2.32% ▲ |

== Results ==
=== Results by alliance or party ===
| Alliance/ Parties | | Popular vote | | | Seats | | |
| Alliance/ Parties | | Votes | % | ±pp | Contested | Won | +/− |
|---|---|---|---|---|---|---|---|
| NDA | BJP | 7,518,104 | 37.93 | ▲1.88 | 11 | 9 | Steady |
| NDA | AGP | 1,289,707 | 6.55 | ▼1.68 | 2 | 1 | ▲1 |
| NDA | UPPL | 488,995 | 2.47 | ▲0.13 | 1 | 1 | ▲1 |
| NDA | Total | 9,296,806 | 46.91 | ▲0.15 | 14 | 11 | ▲2 |
| INDIA | INC | 7,510,363 | 37.89 | ▲2.45 | 13 | 3 | Steady |
| INDIA | AJP | 414,441 | 2.09 | New | 1 | 0 | Steady |
| INDIA | Total | 7,924,804 | 39.98 | New | 14 | 3 | Steady |
| Others | | | | | | | |
| Others | BPF | 777,570 | 3.92 | ▲1.44 | 4 | 0 | Steady |
| Others | AIUDF | 625,954 | 3.16 | ▼4.71 | 3 | 0 | ▼1 |
| Others | APHLC | 187,017 | 0.86 | | 1 | 0 | |
| Others | AAP | 170,912 | 0.86 | | 2 | 0 | |
| Others | GSP | 123,403 | 0.62 | | 4 | 0 | |
| Others | CPI(M) | 96,138 | 0.49 | | 1 | 0 | |
| Others | AITC | 74,641 | 0.38 | | 4 | 0 | |
| Others | SUCI(C) | 26,270 | 0.13 | | 6 | 0 | |
| Others | CPI | 19,631 | 0.10 | | 1 | 0 | |
| Others | ESBD | 16,613 | 0.08 | | 2 | 0 | |
| Others | RPI(A) | 14,317 | 0.07 | | 4 | 0 | |
| Others | RUC | 12,959 | 0.07 | | 4 | 0 | |
| Others | ASDC | 9,633 | 0.05 | | 1 | 0 | |
| Others | BJKP | 12,563 | 0.06 | | 1 | 0 | |
| Others | Independents | 490,385 | 2.47 | ▼2.36 | 53 | 0 | ▼1 |
| Others | Total | 2,357,658 | 13.32 | ▼3.49 | N/A | 0 | ▼2 |
| NOTA | | 240,301 | 1.21 | ▲0.22 | | | |
| Total | | 19,819,569 | 100 | | 143 | 14 | Steady |

=== Results by constituency ===
| Constituency | | Turnout | Winner | | | | Runner-up | | | | Margin | | Total |
| Constituency | | Turnout | Candidate | Party | Votes | % | Candidate | Party | Votes | % | Votes | % | Votes |
|---|---|---|---|---|---|---|---|---|---|---|---|---|---|
| 1 | Kokrajhar (ST) | 83.95 | Joyanta Basumatary | UPPL | 488,995 | 39.39 | Kampa Borgoyari | BPF | 4,37,412 | 35.23 | 51,583 | 4.16 | 1,254,499 |
| 2 | Dhubri | 92.30 | Rakibul Hussain | INC | 1,471,885 | 59.99 | Badruddin Ajmal | AIUDF | 4,59,409 | 18.72 | 10,12,476 | 41.27 | 2,458,780 |
| 3 | Barpeta | 85.40 | Phani Bhusan Choudhury | AGP | 8,60,113 | 51.02 | Deep Bayan | INC | 6,37,762 | 37.83 | 2,22,351 | 13.19 | 1,690,051 |
| 4 | Darrang–Udalguri | 82.21 | Dilip Saikia | BJP | 8,68,387 | 47.95 | Madhab Rajbangshi | INC | 5,39,375 | 29.78 | 3,29,012 | 18.17 | 1,820,644 |
| 5 | Guwahati | 78.56 | Bijuli Kalita Medhi | BJP | 8,94,887 | 55.95 | Mira Borthakur Goswami | INC | 6,43,797 | 40.25 | 2,51,090 | 15.70 | 1,602,455 |
| 6 | Diphu (ST) | 76.20 | Amar Sing Tisso | BJP | 3,34,620 | 49.01 | J. I. Kathar | Ind | 1,87,017 | 27.39 | 1,47,603 | 21.62 | 687,376 |
| 7 | Karimganj | 81.13 | Kripanath Mallah | BJP | 5,45,093 | 47.53 | Hafiz Rashid Ahmed Choudhury | INC | 5,26,733 | 45.93 | 18,360 | 1.60 | 1,147,607 |
| 8 | Silchar (SC) | 79.37 | Parimal Suklabaidya | BJP | 6,52,405 | 59.89 | Surya Kanta Sarkar | INC | 3,88,094 | 35.62 | 2,64,311 | 24.27 | 1,090,948 |
| 9 | Nowgong | 85.15 | Pradyut Bordoloi | INC | 7,88,850 | 50.89 | Suresh Borah | BJP | 5,76,619 | 37.20 | 2,12,331 | 13.69 | 1,550,628 |
| 10 | Kaziranga | 79.64 | Kamakhya Prasad Tasa | BJP | 8,97,043 | 55.04 | Roselina Tirkey | INC | 6,48,096 | 39.76 | 2,48,947 | 15.28 | 1,635,636 |
| 11 | Sonitpur | 78.74 | Ranjit Dutta | BJP | 7,75,788 | 60.21 | Premlal Ganju | INC | 4,14,380 | 32.16 | 3,61,408 | 28.05 | 1,290,556 |
| 12 | Lakhimpur | 76.83 | Pradan Baruah | BJP | 6,63,122 | 54.75 | Uday Shankar Hazarika | INC | 4,61,865 | 38.13 | 2,01,257 | 16.62 | 1,214,239 |
| 13 | Dibrugarh | 76.92 | Sarbananda Sonowal | BJP | 6,93,762 | 54.27 | Lurinjyoti Gogoi | AJP | 4,14,441 | 32.42 | 2,79,321 | 21.85 | 1,278,464 |
| 14 | Jorhat | 80.57 | Gourav Gogoi | INC | 7,51,771 | 54.04 | Topon Kumar Gogoi | BJP | 6,07,378 | 43.66 | 1,44,393 | 10.38 | 1,396,283 |

== Assembly-wise lead of parties ==
=== Party-wise leads ===
2024 Assam Lok Sabha Election Assembly Wise Lead Map

| Party | | Assembly segments (in 2024 lok sabha) | Assembly segments (including 2026 Nagaon bypoll) | Current Position in the Assembly (2026 Assembly elections) |
|---|---|---|---|---|
| NDA | BJP | 75 | 75 | 82 |
| NDA | AGP | 10 | 10 | 10 |
| NDA | BPF | 3 | 3 | 10 |
| NDA | UPPL | 7 | 7 | 0 |
| Total | | 95 | 95 | 102 |
| INDIA | INC | 31 | 27 | 19 |
| Others | AIUDF | 0 | 4 | 2 |
| Others | RD | 0 | 0 | 2 |
| Others | AITC | 0 | 0 | 1 |
| Others | Total | 0 | 9 | 5 |
| Others | Total | | | 126 |

=== Assembly seat-wise leads ===
| Constituency | | Winner | | | | Runner-up | | | | Margin |
| # | Name | Candidate | Party | Votes | % | Candidate | Party | Votes | % | Margin |
Kokrajhar Lok Sabha constituency
| 1 | Gossaigaon | Joyanta Basumatary | UPPL | 35,173 | 38.41 | Kampa Borgoyari | BPF | 20,330 | 22.20 | 14,843 |
| 2 | Dotma (ST) | Joyanta Basumatary | UPPL | 36,490 | 41.38 | Kampa Borgoyari | BPF | 31,933 | 36.21 | 4,557 |
| 3 | Kokrajhar (ST) | Kampa Borgoyari | BPF | 48,207 | 41.62 | Joyanta Basumatary | UPPL | 46,032 | 39.74 | 2,175 |
| 4 | Baokhungri | Joyanta Basumatary | UPPL | 55,015 | 41.21 | Kampa Borgoyari | BPF | 48,660 | 36.45 | 6,355 |
| 5 | Parbatjhora | Kampa Borgoyari | BPF | 56,840 | 37.66 | Joyanta Basumatary | UPPL | 47,302 | 31.34 | 9,538 |
| 19 | Sidli–Chirang (ST) | Joyanta Basumatary | UPPL | 75,317 | 42.35 | Kampa Borgoyari | BPF | 67,788 | 38.12 | 7,529 |
| 20 | Bijni | Joyanta Basumatary | UPPL | 62,763 | 40.52 | Kampa Borgoyari | BPF | 47,609 | 30.73 | 15,154 |
| 41 | Manas | Joyanta Basumatary | UPPL | 68,623 | 41.87 | Kampa Borgoyari | BPF | 57,927 | 35.34 | 10,696 |
| 42 | Baksa (ST) | Joyanta Basumatary | UPPL | 57,966 | 37.89 | Kampa Borgoyari | BPF | 53,474 | 34.96 | 4,492 |
Dhubri Lok Sabha constituency
| 6 | Golakganj | Zabed Islam | AGP | 97,833 | 52.98 | Rakibul Hussain | INC | 68,808 | 37.26 | 29,025 |
| 7 | Gauripur | Rakibul Hussain | INC | 1,91,689 | 69.07 | Badruddin Ajmal | AIUDF | 39,451 | 14.21 | 1,52,238 |
| 8 | Dhubri | Rakibul Hussain | INC | 1,25,094 | 59.52 | Zabed Islam | AGP | 43,393 | 20.64 | 81,701 |
| 9 | Birsing Jarua | Rakibul Hussain | INC | 1,63,211 | 64.66 | Badruddin Ajmal | AIUDF | 66,305 | 26.27 | 96,906 |
| 10 | Bilasipara | Rakibul Hussain | INC | 78,371 | 45.62 | Zabed Islam | AGP | 73,948 | 43.04 | 4,423 |
| 11 | Mankachar | Rakibul Hussain | INC | 1,63,792 | 59.47 | Zabed Islam | AGP | 63,960 | 23.22 | 99,832 |
| 12 | Jaleshwar | Rakibul Hussain | INC | 1,37,048 | 63.24 | Badruddin Ajmal | AIUDF | 56,545 | 26.09 | 80,503 |
| 14 | Goalpara East | Rakibul Hussain | INC | 1,26,453 | 62.44 | Zabed Islam | AGP | 41,691 | 20.58 | 84,762 |
| 17 | Srijangram | Rakibul Hussain | INC | 1,20,369 | 60.16 | Badruddin Ajmal | AIUDF | 48,602 | 24.29 | 71,767 |
| 22 | Mandia | Rakibul Hussain | INC | 1,44,773 | 61.79 | Badruddin Ajmal | AIUDF | 70,152 | 29.94 | 74,621 |
| 23 | Chenga | Rakibul Hussain | INC | 1,48,941 | 67.68 | Badruddin Ajmal | AIUDF | 52,371 | 23.79 | 96,570 |
Barpeta Lok Sabha constituency
| 16 | Abhayapuri | Phani Bhusan Choudhury | AGP | 98,791 | 63.12 | Deep Bayan | INC | 43,682 | 27.91 | 55,109 |
| 18 | Bongaigaon | Phani Bhusan Choudhury | AGP | 98,323 | 65.51 | Deep Bayan | INC | 38,723 | 25.80 | 59,600 |
| 21 | Bhowanipur–Sorbhog | Phani Bhusan Choudhury | AGP | 93,927 | 52.51 | Deep Bayan | INC | 57,174 | 31.96 | 36,753 |
| 24 | Barpeta (SC) | Phani Bhusan Choudhury | AGP | 91,587 | 65.28 | Deep Bayan | INC | 34,159 | 24.35 | 57,428 |
| 25 | Pakabetbari | Deep Bayan | INC | 1,75,341 | 74.45 | Phani Bhusan Choudhury | AGP | 25,355 | 10.77 | 1,49,986 |
| 26 | Bajali | Phani Bhusan Choudhury | AGP | 76,170 | 58.69 | Deep Bayan | INC | 34,584 | 26.65 | 41,586 |
| 30 | Hajo–Sualkuchi (SC) | Phani Bhusan Choudhury | AGP | 80,230 | 50.05 | Deep Bayan | INC | 65,866 | 41.09 | 14,364 |
| 38 | Barkhetry | Phani Bhusan Choudhury | AGP | 94,944 | 50.00 | Deep Bayan | INC | 81,755 | 43.05 | 13,189 |
| 39 | Nalbari | Phani Bhusan Choudhury | AGP | 1,04,817 | 61.75 | Deep Bayan | INC | 48,515 | 28.58 | 56,302 |
| 40 | Tihu | Phani Bhusan Choudhury | AGP | 89,498 | 54.48 | Deep Bayan | INC | 55,612 | 33.85 | 33,886 |
Darrang–Udalguri Lok Sabha constituency
| 31 | Rangiya | Dilip Saikia | BJP | 99,469 | 57.93 | Madhab Rajbangshi | INC | 59,219 | 34.49 | 40,250 |
| 32 | Kamalpur | Dilip Saikia | BJP | 98,247 | 64.25 | Madhab Rajbangshi | INC | 43,212 | 28.26 | 55,035 |
| 43 | Tamulpur (ST) | Dilip Saikia | BJP | 80,412 | 49.63 | Durga Das Boro | BPF | 52,887 | 32.64 | 27,525 |
| 44 | Goreswar | Dilip Saikia | BJP | 86,494 | 54.66 | Durga Das Boro | BPF | 37,580 | 23.75 | 48,914 |
| 45 | Bhergaon | Dilip Saikia | BJP | 68,980 | 55.22 | Durga Das Boro | BPF | 34,045 | 27.25 | 34,935 |
| 46 | Udalguri (ST) | Durga Das Boro | BPF | 50,374 | 38.55 | Dilip Saikia | BJP | 46,949 | 35.93 | 3,425 |
| 47 | Majbat | Dilip Saikia | BJP | 70,656 | 48.25 | Durga Das Boro | BPF | 44,383 | 30.31 | 26,273 |
| 48 | Tangla | Dilip Saikia | BJP | 74,089 | 53.01 | Durga Das Boro | BPF | 30,319 | 21.69 | 43,770 |
| 49 | Sipajhar | Dilip Saikia | BJP | 1,11,781 | 66.48 | Madhab Rajbangshi | INC | 43,903 | 26.11 | 67,878 |
| 50 | Mangaldoi | Dilip Saikia | BJP | 96,213 | 57.85 | Madhab Rajbangshi | INC | 58,288 | 35.04 | 37,925 |
| 51 | Dalgaon | Madhab Rajbangshi | INC | 2,07,735 | 73.37 | Durga Das Boro | BPF | 34,055 | 12.03 | 1,73,680 |
Guwahati Lok Sabha constituency
| 13 | Goalpara West (ST) | Bijuli Kalita Medhi | BJP | 80,825 | 58.58 | Mira Borthakur Goswami | INC | 52,063 | 37.73 | 28,762 |
| 15 | Dudhnoi (ST) | Bijuli Kalita Medhi | BJP | 90,502 | 60.39 | Mira Borthakur Goswami | INC | 52,008 | 34.71 | 38,494 |
| 27 | Chamaria | Mira Borthakur Goswami | INC | 1,81,943 | 86.42 | Bijuli Kalita Medhi | BJP | 21,674 | 10.29 | 1,60,269 |
| 28 | Boko–Chaygaon (ST) | Bijuli Kalita Medhi | BJP | 96,937 | 61.19 | Mira Borthakur Goswami | INC | 53,583 | 33.82 | 43,354 |
| 29 | Palasbari | Bijuli Kalita Medhi | BJP | 1,04,347 | 60.42 | Mira Borthakur Goswami | INC | 59,998 | 34.74 | 44,349 |
| 33 | Dispur | Bijuli Kalita Medhi | BJP | 1,03,933 | 61.53 | Mira Borthakur Goswami | INC | 59,631 | 35.30 | 44,302 |
| 34 | Dimoria (SC) | Bijuli Kalita Medhi | BJP | 1,08,983 | 64.91 | Mira Borthakur Goswami | INC | 52,496 | 31.53 | 56,487 |
| 35 | New Guwahati | Bijuli Kalita Medhi | BJP | 78,387 | 59.27 | Mira Borthakur Goswami | INC | 49,629 | 37.53 | 28,758 |
| 36 | Guwahati Central | Bijuli Kalita Medhi | BJP | 1,02,578 | 73.24 | Mira Borthakur Goswami | INC | 33,611 | 23.99 | 68,967 |
| 37 | Jalukbari | Bijuli Kalita Medhi | BJP | 1,03,735 | 66.44 | Mira Borthakur Goswami | INC | 47,401 | 30.36 | 56,334 |
Diphu Lok Sabha constituency
| 108 | Bokajan (ST) | Amarsing Tisso | BJP | 52,097 | 44.91 | Jones Ingti Kathar | IND | 31,180 | 26.88 | 20,917 |
| 109 | Howraghat (ST) | Amarsing Tisso | BJP | 74,427 | 52.22 | Jones Ingti Kathar | IND | 37,995 | 26.66 | 36,432 |
| 110 | Diphu (ST) | Amarsing Tisso | BJP | 58,621 | 44.18 | Jones Ingti Kathar | IND | 47,247 | 35.61 | 11,374 |
| 111 | Rongkhang (ST) | Amarsing Tisso | BJP | 57,261 | 57.56 | Jones Ingti Kathar | IND | 24,408 | 24.53 | 32,853 |
| 112 | Amri (ST) | Amarsing Tisso | BJP | 30,413 | 42.32 | Jones Ingti Kathar | IND | 27,458 | 38.21 | 2,955 |
| 113 | Haflong (ST) | Amarsing Tisso | BJP | 59,621 | 51.49 | Joyram Engleng | INC | 35,270 | 30.46 | 24,351 |
Karimganj Lok Sabha constituency
| 121 | Hailakandi | Kripanath Mallah | BJP | 1,10,083 | 62.89 | Hafiz Rashid Ahmed Choudhury | INC | 55,556 | 31.74 | 54,527 |
| 122 | Algapur–Katlicherra | Hafiz Rashid Ahmed Choudhury | INC | 1,59,994 | 73.82 | Kripanath Mallah | BJP | 40,757 | 18.81 | 1,19,237 |
| 123 | Karimganj North | Kripanath Mallah | BJP | 1,03,230 | 48.43 | Hafiz Rashid Ahmed Choudhury | INC | 96,328 | 45.15 | 6,992 |
| 124 | Karimganj South | Hafiz Rashid Ahmed Choudhury | INC | 1,36,384 | 62.79 | Kripanath Mallah | BJP | 60,357 | 27.79 | 76,027 |
| 125 | Patharkandi | Kripanath Mallah | BJP | 1,09,547 | 74.57 | Hafiz Rashid Ahmed Choudhury | INC | 30,734 | 20.92 | 78,813 |
| 126 | Ram Krishna Nagar (SC) | Kripanath Mallah | BJP | 1,17,246 | 68.51 | Hafiz Rashid Ahmed Choudhury | INC | 45,394 | 26.52 | 71,852 |
Silchar Lok Sabha constituency
| 114 | Lakhipur | Parimal Suklabaidya | BJP | 91,152 | 69.29 | Suryakanta Sarkar | INC | 35,381 | 26.89 | 55,771 |
| 115 | Udharbond | Parimal Suklabaidya | BJP | 96,680 | 65.98 | Suryakanta Sarkar | INC | 44,517 | 30.38 | 52,163 |
| 116 | Katigorah | Parimal Suklabaidya | BJP | 1,01,904 | 58.16 | Suryakanta Sarkar | INC | 68,409 | 39.04 | 33,495 |
| 117 | Borkhola | Parimal Suklabaidya | BJP | 1,03,071 | 61.99 | Suryakanta Sarkar | INC | 57,596 | 34.64 | 45,475 |
| 118 | Silchar | Parimal Suklabaidya | BJP | 1,08,626 | 66.84 | Suryakanta Sarkar | INC | 45,248 | 27.84 | 63,378 |
| 119 | Sonai | Suryakanta Sarkar | INC | 94,466 | 63.47 | Parimal Suklabaidya | BJP | 44,241 | 29.72 | 50,225 |
| 120 | Dholai (SC) | Parimal Suklabaidya | BJP | 1,01,898 | 67.16 | Suryakanta Sarkar | INC | 40,836 | 26.91 | 61,062 |
Nagaon Lok Sabha constituency
| 52 | Jagiroad (SC) | Suresh Borah | BJP | 1,34,665 | 66.84 | Pradyut Bordoloi | INC | 57,865 | 27.84 | 76,800 |
| 53 | Laharighat | Pradyut Bordoloi | INC | 1,72,340 | 67.16 | Suresh Borah | BJP | 40,803 | 15.90 | 1,31,537 |
| 54 | Morigaon | Suresh Borah | BJP | 1,07,984 | 65.79 | Pradyut Bordoloi | INC | 48,642 | 29.63 | 59,342 |
| 55 | Dhing | Pradyut Bordoloi | INC | 1,28,337 | 65.93 | Aminul Islam | AIUDF | 32,170 | 16.52 | 96,167 |
| 56 | Rupohihat | Pradyut Bordoloi | INC | 1,31,562 | 69.08 | Aminul Islam | AIUDF | 28,938 | 15.19 | 1,02,624 |
| 58 | Samaguri | Pradyut Bordoloi | INC | 1,28,580 | 67.49 | Suresh Borah | BJP | 42,017 | 22.05 | 86,563 |
| 60 | Nagaon–Batadraba | Suresh Borah | BJP | 90,730 | 58.27 | Pradyut Bordoloi | INC | 57,540 | 36.95 | 33,190 |
| 61 | Raha (SC) | Suresh Borah | BJP | 1,04,534 | 55.25 | Pradyut Bordoloi | INC | 61,754 | 32.64 | 42,780 |
Kaziranga Lok Sabha constituency
| 57 | Kaliabor | Kamakhya Prasad Tasa | BJP | 1,05,247 | 68.21 | Roselina Tirkey | INC | 41,126 | 26.65 | 61,121 |
| 59 | Barhampur | Kamakhya Prasad Tasa | BJP | 1,02,625 | 68.21 | Roselina Tirkey | INC | 68,686 | 26.65 | 33,939 |
| 62 | Binnakandi | Roselina Tirkey | INC | 1,54,164 | 73.92 | Kamakhya Prasad Tasa | BJP | 40,920 | 19.62 | 1,13,244 |
| 63 | Hojai | Kamakhya Prasad Tasa | BJP | 1,31,715 | 64.67 | Roselina Tirkey | INC | 64,473 | 31.65 | 67,242 |
| 64 | Lumding | Kamakhya Prasad Tasa | BJP | 1,29,014 | 64.99 | Roselina Tirkey | INC | 61,253 | 30.85 | 67,761 |
| 103 | Golaghat | Kamakhya Prasad Tasa | BJP | 81,932 | 54.14 | Roselina Tirkey | INC | 62,367 | 41.21 | 19,565 |
| 104 | Dergaon | Kamakhya Prasad Tasa | BJP | 75,890 | 56.11 | Roselina Tirkey | INC | 52,060 | 38.49 | 23,830 |
| 105 | Bokakhat | Kamakhya Prasad Tasa | BJP | 73,434 | 62.51 | Roselina Tirkey | INC | 38,361 | 32.65 | 35,073 |
| 106 | Khumtai | Kamakhya Prasad Tasa | BJP | 71,250 | 54.68 | Roselina Tirkey | INC | 50,989 | 39.13 | 20,261 |
| 107 | Sarupathar | Kamakhya Prasad Tasa | BJP | 80,739 | 57.16 | Roselina Tirkey | INC | 52,641 | 37.27 | 28,098 |
Sonitpur Lok Sabha constituency
| 65 | Dhekiajuli | Ranjit Dutta | BJP | 1,11,235 | 64.57 | Premlal Gunju | INC | 46,241 | 26.84 | 64,994 |
| 66 | Barchalla | Ranjit Dutta | BJP | 84,207 | 57.39 | Premlal Gunju | INC | 51,100 | 34.82 | 33,107 |
| 67 | Tezpur | Ranjit Dutta | BJP | 78,268 | 57.06 | Premlal Gunju | INC | 48,168 | 35.11 | 30,100 |
| 68 | Rangapara | Ranjit Dutta | BJP | 77,337 | 58.07 | Premlal Gunju | INC | 45,716 | 34.32 | 31,621 |
| 69 | Nadaur | Ranjit Dutta | BJP | 98,282 | 62.54 | Premlal Gunju | INC | 50,063 | 31.86 | 48,219 |
| 70 | Biswanath | Ranjit Dutta | BJP | 87,267 | 58.13 | Premlal Gunju | INC | 50,048 | 33.33 | 37,219 |
| 71 | Behali (SC) | Ranjit Dutta | BJP | 70,919 | 56.85 | Premlal Gunju | INC | 43,595 | 34.95 | 27,324 |
| 72 | Gohpur | Ranjit Dutta | BJP | 92,668 | 68.46 | Premlal Gunju | INC | 32,841 | 24.26 | 59,827 |
| 73 | Bihpuria | Ranjit Dutta | BJP | 70,835 | 56.96 | Premlal Gunju | INC | 44,781 | 36.01 | 26,054 |
Lakhimpur Lok Sabha constituency
| 74 | Rongonadi | Pradan Baruah | BJP | 71,182 | 49.63 | Uday Shankar Hazarika | INC | 63,268 | 44.11 | 7,914 |
| 75 | Naoboicha (SC) | Uday Shankar Hazarika | INC | 69,066 | 50.09 | Pradan Baruah | BJP | 62,014 | 44.98 | 7,052 |
| 76 | Lakhimpur | Pradan Baruah | BJP | 65,030 | 50.27 | Uday Shankar Hazarika | INC | 56,548 | 43.72 | 8,482 |
| 77 | Dhakuakhana (ST) | Pradan Baruah | BJP | 67,017 | 54.25 | Uday Shankar Hazarika | INC | 49,713 | 40.24 | 17,304 |
| 78 | Dhemaji (ST) | Pradan Baruah | BJP | 70,066 | 54.68 | Uday Shankar Hazarika | INC | 47,423 | 37.01 | 22,643 |
| 79 | Sissiborgaon | Pradan Baruah | BJP | 73,053 | 57.18 | Uday Shankar Hazarika | INC | 45,332 | 35.48 | 27,721 |
| 80 | Jonai (ST) | Pradan Baruah | BJP | 1,09,121 | 66.99 | Uday Shankar Hazarika | INC | 40,675 | 24.97 | 68,446 |
| 81 | Sadiya | Pradan Baruah | BJP | 78,254 | 55.47 | Uday Shankar Hazarika | INC | 51,526 | 36.53 | 26,728 |
| 82 | Doom Dooma | Pradan Baruah | BJP | 63,570 | 58.04 | Uday Shankar Hazarika | INC | 35,169 | 32.11 | 28,401 |
Dibrugarh Lok Sabha constituency
| 83 | Margherita | Sarbananda Sonowal | BJP | 76,537 | 59.02 | Lurinjyoti Gogoi | AJP | 35,904 | 27.68 | 40,633 |
| 84 | Digboi | Sarbananda Sonowal | BJP | 52,034 | 48.45 | Lurinjyoti Gogoi | AJP | 37,167 | 34.61 | 14,867 |
| 85 | Makum | Sarbananda Sonowal | BJP | 61,627 | 51.56 | Lurinjyoti Gogoi | AJP | 36,416 | 30.47 | 25,211 |
| 86 | Tinsukia | Sarbananda Sonowal | BJP | 84,563 | 66.39 | Lurinjyoti Gogoi | AJP | 27,650 | 21.71 | 56,913 |
| 87 | Chabua–Lahowal | Sarbananda Sonowal | BJP | 71,170 | 51.67 | Lurinjyoti Gogoi | AJP | 41,860 | 30.39 | 29,310 |
| 88 | Dibrugarh | Sarbananda Sonowal | BJP | 89,335 | 60.99 | Lurinjyoti Gogoi | AJP | 42,240 | 28.84 | 47,095 |
| 89 | Khowang | Sarbananda Sonowal | BJP | 60,624 | 49.46 | Lurinjyoti Gogoi | AJP | 46,851 | 38.22 | 13,773 |
| 90 | Duliajan | Sarbananda Sonowal | BJP | 69,559 | 53.56 | Lurinjyoti Gogoi | AJP | 43,309 | 33.35 | 26,250 |
| 91 | Tingkhong | Sarbananda Sonowal | BJP | 68,017 | 50.16 | Lurinjyoti Gogoi | AJP | 50,366 | 37.14 | 17,651 |
| 92 | Naharkatia | Sarbananda Sonowal | BJP | 57,687 | 49.09 | Lurinjyoti Gogoi | AJP | 51,030 | 43.42 | 6,657 |
Jorhat Lok Sabha constituency
| 93 | Sonari | Gaurav Gogoi | INC | 71,603 | 52.06 | Topon Kumar Gogoi | BJP | 61,269 | 44.55 | 10,334 |
| 94 | Mahmora | Gaurav Gogoi | INC | 62,680 | 52.57 | Topon Kumar Gogoi | BJP | 53,030 | 44.47 | 9,650 |
| 95 | Demow | Gaurav Gogoi | INC | 77,934 | 54.56 | Topon Kumar Gogoi | BJP | 61,879 | 43.32 | 16,055 |
| 96 | Sibsagar | Gaurav Gogoi | INC | 91,843 | 54.87 | Topon Kumar Gogoi | BJP | 73,095 | 43.67 | 18,745 |
| 97 | Nazira | Gaurav Gogoi | INC | 70,727 | 48.62 | Topon Kumar Gogoi | BJP | 70,600 | 48.54 | 127 |
| 98 | Majuli (ST) | Topon Kumar Gogoi | BJP | 59,276 | 51.98 | Gaurav Gogoi | INC | 52,690 | 46.21 | 6,586 |
| 99 | Teok | Gaurav Gogoi | INC | 86,712 | 56.56 | Topon Kumar Gogoi | BJP | 63,335 | 41.31 | 23,377 |
| 100 | Jorhat | Gaurav Gogoi | INC | 60,697 | 54.47 | Topon Kumar Gogoi | BJP | 48,567 | 43.58 | 12,130 |
| 101 | Mariani | Gaurav Gogoi | INC | 70,916 | 55.41 | Topon Kumar Gogoi | BJP | 54,131 | 42.30 | 16,785 |
| 102 | Titabor | Gaurav Gogoi | INC | 97,392 | 61.72 | Topon Kumar Gogoi | BJP | 56,837 | 36.02 | 40,555 |

== By-election ==
| Constituency | | Turnout | Winner | | | | Runner-up | | | | Margin | | Total |
| Constituency | | Turnout | Candidate | Party | Votes | % | Candidate | Party | Votes | % | Votes | % | Votes |
|---|---|---|---|---|---|---|---|---|---|---|---|---|---|
| 1 | Nagaon | 76.19 | Devasish Sharma | BJP | 714,349 | 49.12 | Badruddin Ajmal | AIUDF | 572,125 | 39.34 | 142,224 | 9.78 | 1,454,380 |

=== Assembly seat-wise leads ===
| Constituency | | Winner | | | | Runner-up | | | | Margin |
| # | Name | Candidate | Party | Votes | % | Candidate | Party | Votes | % | Margin |
Nagaon Lok Sabha constituency
| 52 | Jagiroad (SC) | Devasish Sharma | BJP | 113,918 | 62.45 | Badruddin Ajmal | AIUDF | 46,310 | 25.39 | 67,608 |
| 53 | Laharighat | Badruddin Ajmal | AIUDF | 94,862 | 51.92 | Devasish Sharma | BJP | 62,310 | 34.10 | 32,552 |
| 54 | Morigaon | Devasish Sharma | BJP | 108,443 | 64.91 | Badruddin Ajmal | AIUDF | 41,202 | 24.66 | 67,241 |
| 55 | Dhing | Badruddin Ajmal | AIUDF | 124,190 | 61.22 | Devasish Sharma | BJP | 58,412 | 28.80 | 65,778 |
| 56 | Rupahihat | Badruddin Ajmal | AIUDF | 98,714 | 54.43 | Devasish Sharma | BJP | 61,029 | 33.65 | 37,685 |
| 58 | Samaguri | Badruddin Ajmal | AIUDF | 82,105 | 48.60 | Devasish Sharma | BJP | 68,953 | 40.82 | 13,152 |
| 60 | Nagaon–Batadraba | Devasish Sharma | BJP | 116,842 | 61.50 | Badruddin Ajmal | AIUDF | 53,211 | 28.01 | 63,631 |
| 61 | Raha (SC) | Devasish Sharma | BJP | 121,085 | 60.18 | Badruddin Ajmal | AIUDF | 58,110 | 28.88 | 62,975 |

== See also ==
- 2024 Indian general election in Bihar
- 2024 Indian general election in Chandigarh
- 2024 Indian general election in Punjab
