= North-East Democratic Alliance =

- Abbreviation: NEDA
- Leader: Nitin Nabin (National chairman); Himanta Biswa Sarma (Convener)
- Rajya Sabha Leader: J. P. Nadda (Leader of the House in Rajya Sabha and Union Central Minister)
- Lok Sabha Leader: Narendra Modi (Leader of the House in Lok Sabha and Prime Minister of India)
- Founded: 2016
- Ideology: Big tent; Factions: Ethnocentrism; Regionalism
- Political position: Majority: Right-wing
- Slogan: Eight States. One Force.
- ECI status: Not Required
- Alliance: NDA (National)
- Seats in Rajya Sabha: 13 / 14
- Seats in Lok Sabha: 17 / 25
- Seats in State Legislative Assemblies: 393 / 498 Eight North-eastern States
- Number of states and union territories in government: 7 / 8

The North-East Democratic Alliance (NEDA) is a political coalition that was formed on 24 May 2016, by the Bharatiya Janata Party (BJP). The motive of the new political front is to unite non-Congress parties in Northeast India. Himanta Biswa Sarma was appointed as the convenor of the front.

== History ==
The alliance was established after the BJP-led National Democratic Alliance which includes parties like Asom Gana Parishad and Bodoland People's Front formed its first government in Assam, with the alliance winning a landslide. The founding political parties of the North-East Democratic Alliance led by the BJP on 26 May 2019, included Naga People's Front, Sikkim Democratic Front, People's Party of Arunachal, Asom Gana Parishad and Bodoland People's Front. The Chief Ministers of the northeastern states of Sikkim, Pawan Kumar Chamling; Assam, Sarbananda Sonowal; Arunachal Pradesh, Kalikho Pul and Nagaland, T. R. Zeliang were the founding members of the alliance. BJP President Amit Shah chaired the meeting which was also attended by BJP General Secretary Ram Madhav and BJP North East Zonal Organizing Secretary Ajay Jamwal. The alliance suffered a big setback in Arunachal Pradesh when their 30 MLAs defected back to Indian National Congress.

On 16 September 2016, 43 MLAs from the ruling party, under the CM Pema Khandu, left Indian National Congress to join People's Party of Arunachal in alliance with Bharatiya Janata Party. Though Pema Khandu is still the Chief Minister, it is soon expected that either a coalition government will be formed with BJP as the speaker of the assembly has also changed sides with the CM, or that the Indian Government will dissolve the state assembly for fresh general elections.

In October 2016, People's Party of Arunachal formally joined hands with Bharatiya Janata Party, making Arunachal Pradesh the 15th state to have the BJP-led NDA in power, and with this new coalition, Tamiyo Taga was sworn in as Cabinet minister of Arunachal Pradesh.

On 21 December 2016, Khandu was suspended from the party by the party president and Takam Pario was named as the next likely Chief Minister of Arunachal Pradesh replacing Khandu after People's Party of Arunachal suspended Khandu along with 6 other MLAs.

In December 2016, Khandu proved the majority on the floor with 33 of the People's Party of Arunachal’s 43 legislators joining the Bharatiya Janata Party as the BJP party increased its strength to 45 and it has the support of two independents. He became second Chief Minister of Arunachal Pradesh of Bharatiya Janata Party in Arunachal Pradesh after 44 days lead Gegong Apang government in 2003.

In March 2017, Nongthombam Biren Singh is the leader of Bharatiya Janata Party was sworn in the Chief Ministers of Manipur on 15 March 2017. Here is the list of the ministers of his ministry. The Bharatiya Janata Party allied with National People's Party, Naga People's Front, Lok Janshakti Party and others it was the first time that BJP formed government in Manipur through INC emerged as the single largest party.

In 2018, the BJP and the ruling Nagaland People's Front dissolved their electoral alliance prior to the election. The BJP instead chose to form an alliance with the newly formed Nationalist Democratic Progressive Party, led by former CM Neiphiu Rio. Lok Sabha MP and former Chief Minister Neiphiu Rio of the Nationalist Democratic Progressive Party was declared elected uncontested in the Northern Angami II constituency after no other candidate was nominated against him.

In March 2018, The National People's Party came second behind Indian National Congress by winning 19 seats in the 2018 Meghalaya legislative assembly election. Conrad Sangma staked claim to form government with a letter of support from the 34 MLA, that included 19 from NPP, 6 from United Democratic Party, 4 from People's Democratic Front, two each from Hill State People's Democratic Party and Bharatiya Janata Party, and an independent.

In March 2018, Nationalist Democratic Progressive Party came second behind Naga People's Front by winning 18 seats in the 2018 Nagaland legislative assembly election. Neiphiu Rio staked claim to form the government with a letter of support from the 32 MLA, that included 17 from NDPP, 12 from Bharatiya Janata Party, 1 from Janata Dal (United) and an independent.

In March 2018, Bharatiya Janata Party won the 2018 Tripura legislative assembly election 35 seats. Its ally Indigenous Peoples Front of Tripura won 8 of 9 seats which they contested. The alliance defeated Communist Party of India (Marxist) who was ruling since 1993.

In the 2018 state assembly elections, Mizo National Front has emerged as largest political party and won 26 seats and Pu Zoramthanga became the new Chief Minister of Mizoram. This was the first time that Congress did not have any government in any of the states in Northeast India.

In May 2019, Bharatiya Janata Party won the 2019 Arunachal Pradesh legislative assembly election 41 seats whereas its ally's National People's Party won 5 and Janata Dal (United) got 7 seats. National People's Party was accorded the status of National Party from Election Commission of India as it got 5 seats in the assembly with a vote share of 14.56% getting also the status of a Recognized State Party in Arunachal Pradesh. Janata Dal (United) party got the status of a Recognized State Party by the Election Commission of India as it secured 7 seats in the assembly winning a vote share of 9.88% in the state.

In Sikkim, The Sikkim Krantikari Morcha came close to allying with Bhartiya Janata Party before the 2019 Indian Election but decided to fight alone. They contested on all 32 constituencies of the Sikkim Legislative Assembly and won 17 constituencies, thus ending Pawan Kumar Chamling's 25-year rule in Sikkim. Indra Hang Subba won the Sikkim Lok Sabha constituency by defeating his nearest rival of Sikkim Democratic Front Dek Bahadur Katwal 12,443 margin.

After the assembly election, 1 MLA from Sikkim Krantikari Morcha and 2 MLAs from Sikkim Democratic Front each vacated their second seat after being elected from two constituencies. Before the by-elections to these three vacant seats were held, 10 MLAs of Sikkim Democratic Front defected to Bhartiya Janata Party and 2 MLAs of Sikkim Democratic Front defected to Sikkim Krantikari Morcha, leaving Sikkim Democratic Front with only 1 MLA. SKM had 18 MLAs and BJP had 10 MLAs. In the by-elections held on 21 October 2019, BJP won two seats and SKM one seat. The final seat numbers are: SKM 19 seats, BJP 12 seats and SDF 1 seat.

On 17 June 2020 9 MLAs supporting N. Biren Singh led the government in Manipur revolted against him and withdrew support from his government blaming him for lack of action during the COVID-19 pandemic. During the vote of confidence, he was one of the eight MLAs who had skipped the assembly proceedings defying the party whip for the trust vote. All members resigned from Indian National Congress and later joined Bharatiya Janata Party in the presence of Ram Madhav, Baijayant Panda, and Chief Minister of Manipur N. Biren Singh.

In November 2020, Bharatiya Janata Party announced that it has agreed to support efforts by the UPPL to form an executive body in Bodoland Territorial Council. The leader of the UPPL, Pramod Boro became the new Chief Executive Member of the Bodoland Territorial Council on 15 December 2020.

BJP won a landslide victory in Assam in 2021 Assam Legislative Assembly election.Soon after the election results were declared and the BJP-led NDA emerged victorious it faced the dilemma of who should be made the Chief Minister. While most of the top leaders in the BJP state unit favored incumbent Chief Minister Sarbananda Sonowal, speculations suggest that Himanta Biswa Sarma had more elected MLAs of the BJP on his side. Due to prolonged discontent between the two leaders, a BJP legislature party meeting couldn't have been called. On 10 May 2021, Sarma was sworn in as the Chief Minister of Assam, succeeding his colleague Sarbananda Sonowal.

In March 2022, Nongthombam Biren Singh is the leader of Bharatiya Janata Party was sworn in the Chief Ministers of Manipur on 15 March 2022. Here is the list of the ministers of his ministry. The Bharatiya Janata Party formed the government winning 32 of 60 seats, it was the first time that BJP formed government in Manipur with a majority on its own.

NPP chief Conrad Sangma gave resignation from the post of Chief Minister to Governor Phagu Chauhan. The NPP emerged as the single largest party in 2023 Meghalaya Legislative Assembly election, winning 26 seats. He staked his claim on a new government with support of 32 MLAs (26 NPP, 2 BJP, 2 HSPDP, and 2 Independents). However, later in the evening, HSPDP withdrew their support which reduced the NPP-led MDA tally to 30. The opposition parties with 29 MLAs counter-claimed to form a United Front. Leaders of TMC, Congress, PDF, HSPDP, VPP had meeting with UDP leader Lahkmen Rymbui to form alternative government barring MDA alliance consists NPP and BJP. Later UDP, PDF, and HSPDP pledged support to an NPP-BJP-Independent MDA alliance.

Manik Saha was re-elected as Chief Minister of Tripura to the Governor Satyadev Narayan Arya and staked claim new government with the support of 33 MLAs (32 BJP and 1 IPFT).

In 2023 Nagaland Legislative Assembly election, North East Democratic Alliance again gained the majority in the house after winning election and Neiphiu Rio took oath after post elections. Nationalist Democratic Progressive Party's Hekani Jakhalu Kense from Dimapur III and Salhoutuonuo Kruse from Western Angami constituencies became first women MLAs in the history of Nagaland. Both get elected as NDPP candidates.

In March 2024, Tipra Motha joined Manik Saha-led Tripura government and Animesh Debbarma and Brishaketu Debbarma, took the oath as ministers.

In May 2024, Bharatiya Janata Party won the 2024 Arunachal Pradesh legislative assembly election 46 seats whereas its ally's National People's Party won 5 and Nationalist Congress Party got 3 seats.

The Sikkim Krantikari Morcha contested on all 32 constituencies while aligning with the National Democratic Alliance in Sikkim Legislative Assembly and won 31 out of 32 seats in a landslide.Later, the lone SDF MLA joined Sikkim Krantikari Morcha, thus making the state oppositionless.

Yumnam Khemchand Singh was indeed sworn in as the Chief Minister of Manipur on February 4, 2026. His appointment followed the revocation of President's Rule, which had been in place for nearly a year following the resignation of the previous Chief Minister, Nongthombam Biren Singh, in February 2025.

Dr. Himanta Biswa Sarma is scheduled to be sworn in for his second consecutive term as the Chief Minister of Assam on May 12, 2026. This follows the National Democratic Alliance landslide victory in the 2026 Assembly elections, where the alliance secured 102 out of 126 seats.

== Members ==
	Party	Leader	MPs from NE		MLs in NE	Base State	Joining Year
	Party	Leader	Lok sabha	Rajya sabha	MLs in NE	Base State	Joining Year
1	Bharatiya Janata Party	Himanta Biswa Sarma	14	9	221 / 498	National	2016
2	National People's Party	Conrad Sangma	0	1	48 / 498	National	2018
3	Sikkim Krantikari Morcha	Prem Singh Tamang	1	0	32 / 498	Sikkim	2019
4	Naga People's Front	Neiphiu Rio	0	0	39 / 498	Nagaland	2018
5	Tipra Motha Party	Pradyot Deb Barma	0	0	13 / 498	Tripura	2024
6	United Democratic Party	Metbah Lyngdoh	0	0	4 / 498	Meghalaya	2018
7	Asom Gana Parishad	Atul Bora	1	1	7 / 498	Assam	2016
8	Hill State People's Democratic Party		0	0	2 / 498	Meghalaya	2018
9	Lok Janshakti Party (Ram Vilas)		0	0	2 / 498	Nagaland	2023
10	People's Party of Arunachal		0	0	2 / 498	Arunachal Pradesh	2024
11	Republican Party of India (Athawale)		0	0	2 / 498	Nagaland	2023
12	Indigenous People's Front of Tripura		0	0	1 / 498	Tripura	2018
13	Janata Dal (United)		0	0	1 / 498	Manipur	
Total			17	13	406 / 498		

== Strength in NE state assemblies ==
State	Seats	NEDA		Overall Tally	CM of	Ref(s)
State	Seats	BJP	NDA	Overall Tally	CM of	Ref(s)
Arunachal Pradesh	60	46	NPP (1)	59 / 60	BJP	
Arunachal Pradesh	60	46	NCP (3)	59 / 60	BJP	
Arunachal Pradesh	60	46	PPA (6)	59 / 60	BJP	
Arunachal Pradesh	60	46	IND (3)	59 / 60	BJP	
Assam	126	82	AGP (10)	102 / 126	BJP	
Assam	126	82	BPF(10)	102 / 126	BJP	
Manipur	60	37	NPP (6)	53 / 60	BJP	
Manipur	60	37	NPF (5)	53 / 60	BJP	
Manipur	60	37	JD(U)(1)	53 / 60	BJP	
Manipur	60	37	IND (3)	53 / 60	BJP	
Meghalaya	60	10	NPP(32)	51 / 60	NPP	
Meghalaya	60	10	UDP(4)	51 / 60	NPP	
Meghalaya	60	10	HSPDP(2)	51 / 60	NPP	
Meghalaya	60	10	IND (2)	51 / 60	NPP	
Mizoram	40	2	none	2 / 40	ZPM	
Nagaland	60	12	NPF(39)	60 / 60	NPF	
Nagaland	60	12	LJP(RV)(2)	60 / 60	NPF	
Nagaland	60	12	RPI(A) (2)	60 / 60	NPF	
Nagaland	60	12	IND (5)	60 / 60	NPF	
Sikkim	32	0	SKM (32)	32 / 32	SKM	
Tripura	60	33	TPM (13)	47 / 60	BJP	
Tripura	60	33	IPFT (1)	47 / 60	BJP	
Total	498	221	189	393 / 498		

== Legislative Leaders ==
=== Chief Ministers (24 May 2016 till date) ===
State	Govt Since	Chief Minister	Portrait	Party	CM Since
Arunachal Pradesh	19 January 2016 – 13 July 2016	Kalikho Pul		People's Party of Arunachal	
Arunachal Pradesh	29 December 2016	Pema Khandu		Bharatiya Janata Party	29 December 2016
Assam	24 May 2016 – 10 May 2021	Sarbananda Sonowal		Bharatiya Janata Party	
Assam	24 May 2016	Himanta Biswa Sarma		Bharatiya Janata Party	10 May 2021
Manipur	15 March 2017 - 13 February 2025	N. Biren Singh		Bharatiya Janata Party	
Manipur	4 February 2026	Yumnam Khemchand Singh		Bharatiya Janata Party	4 February 2026
Meghalaya	6 March 2018	Conrad Sangma		National People's Party	6 March 2018
Nagaland	19 July 2017 – 8 March 2018	T. R. Zeliang		Naga People's Front	
Nagaland	22 February 2017 – 19 July 2017	Shürhozelie Liezietsu		Naga People's Front	
Nagaland	7 March 2008	Neiphiu Rio		Naga People's Front	7 March 2018
Sikkim	23 May 2019	Prem Singh Tamang		Sikkim Krantikari Morcha	23 May 2019
Tripura	9 March 2018 – 14 May 2022	Biplab Kumar Deb		Bharatiya Janata Party	
Tripura	6 March 2018	Manik Saha		Bharatiya Janata Party	15 May 2022

=== Deputy chief ministers (16 May 2016 till date) ===
Portrait	Dy.Chief Minister	Party	Under Chief Minister	Term
	Chowna Mein	People's Party of Arunachal Bharatiya Janata Party	Pema Khandu	(2016-2019, 2019-till date)
	Prestone Tynsong	National People's Party (India)	Conrad Sangma	(2018-2023, 2023 till date)
	Sniawbhalang Dhar	National People's Party (India)	Conrad Sangma	(2023 till date)
	T. R. Zeliang	Naga People's Front	Neiphiu Rio	(2023 till date)
	Yanthungo Patton	Bharatiya Janata Party	Neiphiu Rio	(2018-2023, 2023 till date)
	Jishnu Dev Varma	Bharatiya Janata Party	Biplab Kumar Deb, Manik Saha	(2018-2023)
	Yumnam Joykumar Singh	National People's Party (India)	N. Biren Singh	(2017-2022)
	Losii Dikho	Naga People's Front	Yumnam Khemchand Singh	(2026- till date)
	Nemcha Kipgen	Bharatiya Janata Party	Yumnam Khemchand Singh	(2026- till date)

=== Union Ministers (1996 till date) ===
Prime Minister	Minister	Party
Atal Bihari Vajpayee	Thounaojam Chaoba Singh	Manipur State Congress Party
Atal Bihari Vajpayee	Omak Apang	Arunachal Congress
Atal Bihari Vajpayee	Bijoya Chakravarty	Bharatiya Janata Party
Atal Bihari Vajpayee	Kabindra Purkayastha	Bharatiya Janata Party
Atal Bihari Vajpayee	Satyabrata Mookherjee	Bharatiya Janata Party
Narendra Modi	Sarbananda Sonowal	Bharatiya Janata Party
Narendra Modi	Kiren Rijiju	Bharatiya Janata Party
Narendra Modi	Rameswar Teli	Bharatiya Janata Party
Narendra Modi	Rajkumar Ranjan Singh	Bharatiya Janata Party
Narendra Modi	Rajen Gohain	Bharatiya Janata Party
Narendra Modi	Pratima Bhoumik	Bharatiya Janata Party
Narendra Modi	Pabitra Margherita	Bharatiya Janata Party

List of BJP's Lok Sabha MPs from North East India

MP	Lok Sabha Term	
Sarbananda Sonowal	(2014-2016, 2024 till date)	Tarun Gogoi, Himanta Biswa Sarma
Dwaraka Nath Das	(1991-1996, 1996-1998)	Hiteswar Saikia, Bhumidhar Barman
Pradan Baruah	(2017-2019, 2019-2024, 2024 till date)	Sarbananda Sonowal, Himanta Biswa Sarma
Rameswar Teli	(2014-2019, 2019-2024)	Tarun Gogoi, Sarbananda Sonowal
Ram Prasad Sharma	(2014-2019)	Tarun Gogoi
Queen Oja	(2019-2024)	Sarbananda Sonowal
Ramen Deka	(2009-2014, 2014-2019)	Tarun Gogoi
Rajen Gohain	(1999-2004, 2004-2009, 2009–2014, 2014-2019)	Prafulla Kumar Mahanta, Tarun Gogoi
Kamakhya Prasad Tasa	(2014-2019, 2024 till date)	Tarun Gogoi, Himanta Biswa Sarma
Bijoya Chakravarty	(1999-2004, 2009-2014, 2014–2019)	Prafulla Kumar Mahanta, Tarun Gogoi
Rajdeep Roy	(2019-2024)	Sarbananda Sonowal
Kripanath Mallah	(2019-2024, 2024 till date)	Sarbananda Sonowal, Himanta Biswa Sarma
Narayan Chandra Borkataky	(2004-2009)	Tarun Gogoi
Dilip Saikia	(2019-2024, 2024 till date)	Sarbananda Sonowal, Himanta Biswa Sarma
Pallab Lochan Das	(2019-2024)	Sarbananda Sonowal
Topon Kumar Gogoi	(2019-2024)	Sarbananda Sonowal
Horen Sing Bey	(2019-2024)	Sarbananda Sonowal
Parimal Suklabaidya	(2024 till date)	Himanta Biswa Sarma
Amarsing Tisso	(2024 till date)	Himanta Biswa Sarma
Bijuli Kalita Medhi	(2024 till date)	Himanta Biswa Sarma
Ranjit Dutta	(2024 till date)	Himanta Biswa Sarma
Rajkumar Ranjan Singh	(2019-2024)	N. Biren Singh
Rebati Tripura	(2019-2024)	Biplab Kumar Deb
Pratima Bhoumik	(2019-2024)	Biplab Kumar Deb
Kiren Rijiju	(2004-2009, 2014-2019, 2019–2024, 2024 till date)	Gegong Apang, Nabam Tuki, Pema Khandu
Tapir Gao	(2004-2009, 2019-2024, 2024 till date)	Gegong Apang, Pema Khandu
Biplab Kumar Deb	(2024 till date)	Manik Saha
Kriti Singh Debbarma	(2024 till date)	Manik Saha
Devasish Sharma	(2026 till date)	Himanta Biswa Sarma

List of BJP's Rajya Sabha M.P.s from North East India

MP	Term	Under Chief Minister
Nabam Rebia	(2020 till date)	Pema Khandu
Indramoni Bora	(2001-2007)	Tarun Gogoi
Kamakhya Prasad Tasa	(2019-2024)	Sarbananda Sonowal
Sarbananda Sonowal	(2021-2024))	Himanta Biswa Sarma
Biswajit Daimary	(2020-2021)	Sarbananda Sonowal
Bhubaneswar Kalita	(2020-2026)	Sarbananda Sonowal
Pabitra Margherita	(2022 till date)	Himanta Biswa Sarma
Bhabananda Singh	(2017-2020)	N. Biren Singh
Leishemba Sanajaoba	(2020 till date)	N. Biren Singh
Biplab Kumar Deb	(2022-2024)	Manik Saha
Manik Saha	(2022-2022)	Biplab Kumar Deb
Phangnon Konyak	(2022 till date)	Neiphiu Rio
Dorjee Tshering Lepcha	(2024 till date)	Prem Singh Tamang
Mission Ranjan Das	(2024-2025)	Himanta Biswa Sarma
Rameswar Teli	(2024-2026)	Himanta Biswa Sarma
Rajib Bhattacharya	(2024 till date)	Manik Saha
Kanad Purkayastha	(2025 till date)	Himanta Biswa Sarma
Jogen Mohan	(2026 till date)	Himanta Biswa Sarma
Terash Gowalla	(2027 till date)	Himanta Biswa Sarma

== NEDA Coalition in ADCs ==
Autonomous district councils operating under the Sixth Schedule of the Constitution of India are shown in bold.

State/Union Territory	Autonomous Council	Headquarters	Districts / Subdivisions	Formation	Last Election	Ruling Party	Chief Executive
Assam	**Bodoland**	Kokrajhar	Baksa, Chirang, Kokrajhar, Udalguri	2003	2025	BJP & BPF	Hagrama Mohilary
Assam	Deori Autonomous Council	Narayanpur	Lakhimpur	2005	2016	BJP	Madhav Deori
Assam	**North Cachar Hills/Dima Hasao Autonomous Council**	Haflong	Dima Hasao	1951	2019	BJP	Debolal Gorlosa
Assam	**Karbi Anglong Autonomous Council**	Diphu	Karbi Anglong, West Karbi Anglong	1952	2017	BJP	Tuliram Ronghang
Assam	Moran Autonomous Council	**	Tinsukia district	2020	TBA	TBA	
Assam	Mising Autonomous Council	Dhemaji	Dhemaji	1995	2019	BJP & Sanmilita Gana Shakti	Ranoj Pegu
Assam	Rabha Hasong Autonomous Council	Dudhnoi	Kamrup Rural, Goalpara	1995	2019	BJP & RHJMC	Tankeswar Rabha
Assam	Sonowal Kachari Autonomous Council	Dibrugarh		2005	2019	BJP	TBA
Assam	Thengal Kachari Autonomous Council	Titabar		2005	2016	BJP	TBA
Assam	Tiwa Autonomous Council	Morigaon, Bongaigaon, Dhubri	Kamrup (Metro), Morigaon, Nagaon and Hojai	1995	2020	BJP	Jiban Chandra Konwar
Meghalaya	**Garo Hills**	Tura	East Garo Hills, West Garo Hills, South Garo Hills, North Garo Hills and South West Garo Hills	1973	2021	--	Benedick Marak
Meghalaya	**Jaintia Hills**	Jowai	East Jaintia Hills, West Jaintia Hills	1973	2019	NPP & UDP	A. H. Darnei
Meghalaya	**Khasi Hills**	Shillong	West Khasi Hills, East Khasi Hills and Ri Bhoi	1973	2019	UDP & NPP	Titosstarwell Chyne
Mizoram	**Chakma Autonomous District Council**	Lunglei	Kamalanagar	1972	Molin Kumar Chakma	2023	BJP
Mizoram	**Lai Autonomous District Council**	Lai	Lawngtlai	1972	V. Zirsanga	2021	BJP and MNF
Mizoram	**Mara Autonomous District Council**	Saiha	Siaha	M Laikaw	2022	BJP	
Tripura	**Tripura Tribal Areas Autonomous District Council**	**Khumulwng**	1982	Purna Chandra Jamatia	2026	TMP and BJP	

== See also ==
- National Democratic Alliance
- Coalition government
- Second Saha ministry
- Second Conrad Sangma ministry
- Yumnam Khemchand Singh ministry
- Fifth Rio ministry
- Sarbananda Sonowal ministry
- Prem Singh Tamang ministry
- First Sarma ministry
- Second Sarma ministry
- Fifth Khandu ministry
