= Khalilur Rahman Chowdhury =

Khalilur Rahman Chowdhury may refer to:

- Khalilur Rahman Chowdhury (Indian politician)
- Khalilur Rahman Chowdhury (Bangladeshi politician)
