= Probyn =

Probyn or Probin may refer to the following people:

== Given name ==
- Probin Deka (born 1943), Indian politician
- Probin Kumar Gogoi, Indian politician
- Probyn Inniss (born 1935), Governor of Saint Kitts and Nevis

== Surname ==
- Andrew Probyn, Australian journalist
- Major Cyril Probyn Napier Raikes (1875–1963), Military Cross recipient
- Dighton Probyn (1833–1924), English Victoria Cross recipient
- Dudley Probyn (1912–2005), Australian rules footballer
- Edmund Probyn (1678–1742), British judge
- Elspeth Probyn (1958–2025), Australian academic
- Jeff Probyn (born 1956), English international Rugby Union player
- John Webb Probyn (1828–1915), English historian and writer
- Leslie Probyn (1862–1938), an administrator for the British Empire
- May Probyn (1856–1909), English poet
- Siaka Probyn Stevens (1905–1988), president of the Republic of Sierra Leone (1967–1985)

== See also ==
- Probyn-Jones baronets
- 5th King Edward's Own Probyn's Horse
