= Badruddin Ajmal =

Indian politician (born 1950)

Mawlānā Badruddin Ajmal
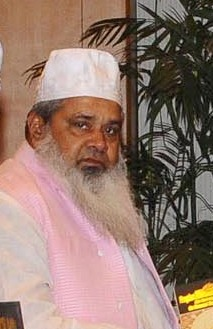
- Ajmal in 2016

Member of the Assam Legislative Assembly
- Incumbent
- Assumed office 4 May 2026
- Preceded by: Constituency established
- Constituency: Binnakandi
- In office 11 May 2006 – 16 May 2009
- Preceded by: Wazed Ali Choudhury
- Succeeded by: Wazed Ali Choudhury
- Constituency: Salmara South
- In office 11 May 2006 – 17 October 2006
- Preceded by: Khalilur Rahman Chowdhury
- Succeeded by: Sirajuddin Ajmal
- Constituency: Jamunamukh

Member of Parliament, Lok Sabha
- In office 16 May 2009 – 4 June 2024
- Preceded by: Anwar Hussain
- Succeeded by: Rakibul Hussain
- Constituency: Dhubri

President of the All India United Democratic Front
- Incumbent
- Assumed office 2 October 2005
- Preceded by: Post Established

State President of Jamiat Ulama-e-Hind, Assam unit

Chief Executive Officer of Ajmal Foundation
- Incumbent
- Assumed office 2005
- Preceded by: Post Established

Personal details
- Born: 12 February 1950 (age 76) Hojai, Assam, India
- Party: All India United Democratic Front (2005-present)
- Spouse: Rehana Badruddin Ajmal
- Children: Abdur Rehman Ajmal (son); Abdur Rahim Ajmal (son) Abdul Majid Ajmal(son)
- Relatives: Sirajuddin Ajmal (brother)
- Education: Darul Uloom Deoband
- Profession: Politician, businessman
- As of 23 December 2024

Badruddin Ajmal (born 12 February 1950) is an Indian businessman, politician, philanthropist and Islamic theologian from the state of Assam. He is the state-president of Jamiat Ulema-e-Hind for Assam. He was the Member of Parliament, Lok Sabha from Dhubri constituency from 2009 to 2024. In the 2024 Indian general elections, he was the wealthiest candidate from Assam with declared assets exceeding ₹ 155 crore. He is the founding President of the All India United Democratic Front since 2005. He is also Chief Executive Officer of a non-profit organization, Ajmal Foundation which established 25 educational institutions, schools, and hospitals.

== Biography ==
Ajmal was born to a Bengali Muslim family from Hojai, Assam. His family traces its origins to the Sylhet district of eastern Bengal. He is the son of Haji Ajmal Ali, a rice farmer who moved to Mumbai in 1950 to try to succeed in the perfume industry using the oud plant. After the opening of the first store in the 1960s, the Ajmal perfume brand quickly grew to become a large brand in the Middle East. He holds master's degrees in Theology and Arabic from Darul Uloom Deoband.

== Career ==
The son of the founder of Ajmal Perfumes, he established the All India United Democratic Front (AIUDF) in 2005. He is also the president of the Assam State Jamiat Ulema-e-Hind. He is a three-time MP from Dhubri constituency. He has been regularly listed among "The 500 Most Influential Muslims" of the world.

He is the managing trustee of Haji Abdul Majid Memorial (HAMM) Public Trust, Hojai. This trust is best known for the charitable hospital Haji Abdul Majid Memorial Hospital and Research Center at Hojai, Assam. He also established a hospital at Malua near Badarpur of Karimganj, named as Badarpur Hospital. In 2005, he established Ajmal Foundation, a non-governmental organization based in Assam, India, and operating 25 educational institutions across the state. Since 1995, he has served as director of Shaikhul Hind Academy, a department of Darul Uloom Deoband.

== Political activities ==
He was the president of Hojai session reception committee of Assam Sahitya Sabha, 2004 and Darul Hadith, Jayanagar Madrassa. Assam Ajmal's political debut came in 2005 after the Supreme Court struck down the Illegal Migrants (Determination by Tribunal) Act. Ajmal founded the Assam United Democratic Front, which was renamed the All-India United Democratic Front in 2013.

Before the 2006 Assam assembly elections, Ajmal was politically insignificant. During the 2006 elections however, his party managed to win 10 seats fighting the Congress. He was elected simultaneously from two constituencies – South Salmara and Jamunamukh – by a large margin of votes. In the 2009 Lok Sabha elections, Ajmal won from Dhubri constituency.

In the 2011 Assembly polls, AIUDF won 18 seats and emerged as the largest opposition party in Assam.

In the 2014 Lok Sabha polls, Ajmal was re-elected from Dhubri and his party won 3 Lok Sabha seats. In the 2016 assembly elections, however, the BJP swept the polls and Ajmal himself lost the Salmara South constituency. His party was reduced to 13 seats.

In the 2019 Lok Sabha elections, Ajmal was the only candidate from his party to keep his seat, winning again from Dhubri. With 7 children, he has most children for any Member of Parliament in India. In 2020, Ajmal announced he and Congress would be in alliance for the 2021 polls.

Badruddin Ajmal won from the Binnakandi Assembly constituency in 2026 Assam assembly elections.

Ajmal contested the by election which occurred in Nagaon Lok Sabha constituency due to resignation of sitting MP. He however, lost the election to BJP candidate Devasish Sharma, though he surpassed Congress candidate by over 4 lakh votes, who come a distant third.

== Electoral History ==
=== Legislative Assembly ===
Year	Constituency	Party	Votes	%	Opponent	Party	Votes	%	Result	Margin	%
2026	Binnakandi	AIUDF	1,19,721	50.54	Rejaul Karim Chowdhury	AJP	84,341	35.60	Won	+35,380	+14.94
2016	South Salmara	AIUDF	63,343	43.06	Wazed Ali Chowdhury	INC	80,066	54.43	Lost	-16,723	-11.37

=== Lok Sabha ===
Year	Constituency	Party	Votes	%	Opponent	Party	Votes	%	Result	Margin	%
2026 (Note: By-election)	Nagaon	AIUDF	5,72,125	39.34	Devasish Sharma	BJP	7,14,349	49.12	Lost	-142,224	-9.78
2024	Dhubri	AIUDF	4,59,409	18.72	Rakibul Hussain	INC	14,71,885	59.99	Lost	-10,12,476	-41.27
2019	Dhubri	AIUDF	7,18,764	42.66	Abu Taher Bepari	INC	4,92,506	29.23	Won	+2,26,258	+13.43
2014	Dhubri	AIUDF	5,92,569	43.26	Wazed Ali Choudhury	INC	3,62,839	26.49	Won	+2,29,730	+16.77
2009	Dhubri	AIUDF	5,40,802	51.66	Anwar Hussain	INC	3,56,401	34.04	Won	+1,84,401	+17.62
2009	Silchar	AIUDF	2,02,062	29.35	K. Purkayastha	BJP	2,43,532	35.37	Lost	-41,470	-6.02

== Controversy ==
Ajmal's statements have often courted controversy for polarizing Bengali Muslims. Following the 2012 Assam riots, Ajmal claimed the violence was between Bodos and Muslims. The remarks were criticised by an Assamese Muslim group, the Sadou Asom Gariya – Moria Desi (SAGMJ), along with the All Assam Students Union, for ignoring that Assamese Muslim were not involved at all.

On 22 January 2021, at a rally in Dhubri, Ajmal claimed that the Bharatiya Janata Party (BJP) had a list of 3500 mosques it would destroy if returned to power at the Centre and that “they will not let women go out wearing ‘burqa’, grow a beard, wear a skullcap or even offer azaan at mosques.” The BJP claimed he was making "communal statements" out of nervousness since BJP "will get majority share of Muslim votes" this election. Congress, with whom Ajmal is in alliance, as well as NDA party Asom Gana Parishad also condemned the remarks.

On 7 January 2023, ahead of the Ram Mandir consecration, Ajmal suggested that Muslims should stay indoors and avoid traveling by train, citing fears of anti-Muslim violence. Giriraj Singh of the Bharatiya Janata Party criticised Ajmal's comments, saying "BJP does not hate Muslims ... BJP respect all religions."

On 24 February 2025, Ajmal apologized for remarks he had made about Geetashri Tamuly, wife of MLA Akhil Gogoi. When asked about her appointment as a faculty member in a Guwahati college, Ajmal reportedly dismissed commenting on her, calling her an "old woman," but added that he would have spoken if the issue involved a "young woman." His remarks were described as sexist by the youth wing of the Raijor Dal party, and both its youth wing and women's wing filed police reports. Ajmal issued a video apology, stating his words were misinterpreted by the media and reiterating his respect for women.

== See also ==
- List of Deobandis

Party political offices
Preceded by Badruddin Ajmal	Leader of the All India United Democratic Front Party in the 16th Lok Sabha; 2014–2024	Succeeded by Vacant
