= Sirajuddin Ajmal =

Indian politician

Member of the Assam Legislative Assembly
- Incumbent
- Assumed office 2 May 2021
- Preceded by: Abdur Rahim Ajmal
- Constituency: Jamunamukh

Member of Parliament, 16th Lok Sabha
- In office 16 May 2014 – 23 May 2019
- Preceded by: Ismail Hussain
- Succeeded by: Abdul Khaleque
- Constituency: Barpeta

Member of the Assam Legislative Assembly
- In office 17 October 2006 – 16 May 2014
- Preceded by: Badruddin Ajmal
- Succeeded by: Abdur Rahim Ajmal
- Constituency: Jamunamukh

Personal details
- Born: 21 February 1958 (age 68) Hojai, Assam
- Party: All India United Democratic Front
- Spouse: Munira Sirajuddin Ajmal
- Children: Abdul Haleem Ajmal(son) Abdul Hafiz Ajmal(son) Abdul Karim Ajmal(son) 3 daughters
- Relatives: Badruddin Ajmal (brother); Amiruddin Ajmal (brother); Nazirul Haq Ajmal (brother); Fakhruddin Ajmal (brother); Abdur Rehman Ajmal (nephew); Abdur Rahim Ajmal (nephew)
- Education: University of Mumbai
- As of 12 December, 2016

Sirajuddin Ajmal (born 21 February 1958) is an Indian politician of All India United Democratic Front who is serving as the Member of the Assam Legislative Assembly representing Jamunamukh constituency since 2021 and from 2006 to 2014. He has also served as the Member of the Parliament, Lok Sabha from the Barpeta Lok Sabha constituency from 2014 to 2019. His brother, Badruddin Ajmal is also the Member of the Lok Sabha.

== Biography ==
Ajmal was born on 21 February 1958 to a Bengali Muslim family from Hojai in central Assam. His family traces their origins to the Sylhet district of eastern Bengal. He is the son of Haji Ajmal Ali, a rice farmer who moved to Mumbai in 1950 to try to succeed in the perfume industry using the oud plant. After the opening of the first store in the 1960s, the Ajmal perfume brand quickly grew to become a large brand in the Middle East.

== Career ==
He is one of the directors of Ajmal Foundation (NGO) which is actively involved in social welfare activities in the state of Assam, India. The major activities of Ajmal Foundation are:

Ajmal Group of Colleges (13 Colleges) National Talent Search Examinations Literacy Programmes Ajmal Computer Education Centres (25 Nos.) Academic and Professional Coaching Programmes Employment Generation Projects Women Empowerment Schemes Merit Scholarships, Medical Aids, Marriage Aids, Safe Drinking Water Schemes, Low Cost House, Appliances to differently abled persons, sanitation scheme and relief distribution. Ajmal Foundation also has future plans of setting up Ajmal University, Ajmal Engineering College, Ajmal College of Education, Ajmal College of Pharmacy for the poor and downtrodden.
