= Rupam Chandra Roy =

Indian politician (born 1994)

Assam Legislative Assembly
- Incumbent
- Assumed office 4 May 2026
- Constituency: Baokhungri Assembly constituency

Personal details
- Party: Bodoland People's Front
- Profession: Politician

Rupam Chandra Roy (born 1994) is an Indian politician from the northeastern state of Assam. He was a member of the Assam Legislative Assembly from Baokhungri Assembly constituency in Kokrajhar district representing the Bodoland People's Front.

Roy is from Sidli Chirang, Kokrajhar district, Assam. He is the son of the late Dayal Chandra Roy. He completed his Bachelor of Arts in 2014 at Basugaon College, which is affiliated with Gauhati University, Assam. He runs his own business. He declared assets worth Rs.59 lakhs in his affidavit to the Election Commission of India.

== Career ==
Roy won the Baokhungri Assembly constituency representing the Bodoland People's Front in the 2026 Assam Legislative Assembly election. He polled 62,677 votes and defeated his nearest rival, Sapali Marak of the Indian National Congress, by a margin of 23,710 votes.
