= Jamunamukh Assembly constituency =

Assembly constituency of Assam

Coordinates: 26.11°N 92.75°E

Jamunamukh
- Constituency No. 90 for the Assam Legislative Assembly

Constituency details
- Country: India
- Region: Northeast India
- State: Assam
- District: Hojai
- Lok Sabha constituency: Nowgong
- Established: 1951
- Total electors: 2,21,862
- Reservation: None

Member of Legislative Assembly
- 15th Assam Legislative Assembly
- Incumbent Sirajuddin Ajmal
- Party: AIUDF
- Elected year: 2021

Jamunamukh Assembly Constituency was one of the 126 assembly constituencies of Assam a north east state of India. Jamunamukh was also part of Nowgong Lok Sabha constituency.

A new constituency, Binnakandi, has been created in Jamunamukh with redrawn boundaries, now part of Kaziranga parliamentary constituency instead of Nagaon.

== Members of Legislative Assembly ==
Election	Member	Party affiliation
1952	Bimala Kanta Bara	Indian National Congress
1957	Maulavi Rahimuddin Ahmed	Indian National Congress
1962	Begum Afia Ahmed	Independent
1967	Lakshmi Prasad Goswami	Indian National Congress
1972	Debendra Nath Bora	Indian National Congress
1978	Mujamil Ali Choudhury	Janata Party
1983	Mohammad Farman Ali	Indian National Congress
1985	Abdul Jalil Ragibi	Independent
1991	Abdul Jalil Ragibi	Indian National Congress
1996	Khalilur Rahman Chowdhury	Asom Gana Parishad
2001	Khalilur Rahman Chowdhury	Asom Gana Parishad
2006	Badruddin Ajmal	All India United Democratic Front
2006^	Sirajuddin Ajmal	All India United Democratic Front
2011	Sirajuddin Ajmal	All India United Democratic Front
2014^	Abdur Rahim Ajmal	All India United Democratic Front
2016	Abdur Rahim Ajmal	All India United Democratic Front
2021	Sirajuddin Ajmal	All India United Democratic Front

^ Indicates Bye-Elections

== Election results ==
=== 2016 ===
2016 Assam Legislative Assembly election: Jamunamukh
Party	Candidate	Votes	%	±%
AIUDF	Abdur Rahim Ajmal	65,599	42.57	−9.54
Independent	Rejaul Karim Chowdhury	52,394	34.00	N/A
INC	Bashiruddin Laskar	23,849	15.47	−17.39
AGP	Ziauddin Ahmed	4,732	3.07	N/A
Independent	Badar Uddin	1,956	1.26	−0.57
Independent	Abdul Wahid	904	0.58	N/A
Independent	Shamal Das	756	0.49	N/A
Independent	Sumitra Borah	653	0.42	N/A
Independent	Jugal Bodo (Dilu)	611	0.39	N/A
JCP	Nurul Hoque	489	0.31	N/A
JMBP	Sumti Bora	309	0.20	N/A
Independent	Minaz Uddin	266	0.17	N/A
Independent	Basir Uddin	233	0.15	N/A
Independent	Kamal Uddin	208	0.13	N/A
NOTA	None of the above	1,129	0.73	N/A
Majority		13,205	8.57	−10.68
Turnout		1,54,088	84.28	+10.10
AIUDF hold		Swing		

=== 2014 by-election ===
2014 by-election: Jamunamukh
Party	Candidate	Votes	%	±%
AIUDF	Abdur Rahim Ajmal	62,153	52.11	
INC	Bashir Uddin Laskar	39,194	32.86	
BJP	Bilal Uddin	13,868	11.63	
Independent	Bodor Uddin	2,184	1.83	
Independent	Ranjit Debnath	589	0.49	
SUCI(C)	Sona Ram Bora	559	0.47	
Independent	Moulana Motahir Ali	392	0.33	
Independent	Prafulla Saikia	341	0.29	
Majority		22,959	19.25	
Turnout		1,19,280	74.18	
AIUDF hold		Swing		

=== 2011 ===
2011 Assam Legislative Assembly election: Jamunamukh
Party	Candidate	Votes	%	±%
Majority				
Turnout				
	AIUDF hold	Swing		

== See also ==
- Jamunamukh
- Hojai district
- List of constituencies of Assam Legislative Assembly
