= Dharanidhar Das =

Indian politician (born 1919)

Member of Parliament, Lok Sabha
- In office 1971-1977
- Preceded by: Hem Barua
- Succeeded by: Hira Lal Patwary
- Constituency: Mangaldoi, Assam

Personal details
- Born: April 1919 Bajali, Kamrup district, Assam, British India
- Died: 18 May 2002 (aged 83) Guwahati, Assam
- Party: Indian National Congress
- Spouse: Usha Das
- Children: Malavika Das (daughter), Phanindra Das (son) and Khanindra Das (son)

Dharanidhar Das (born April 1919) was an Indian politician and lawmaker. He was elected to the Lok Sabha, the lower house of the Indian Parliament, from the Mangaldoi constituency of Assam as a member of the Indian National Congress.
