= Santiuse Kujur =

Indian social worker and politician

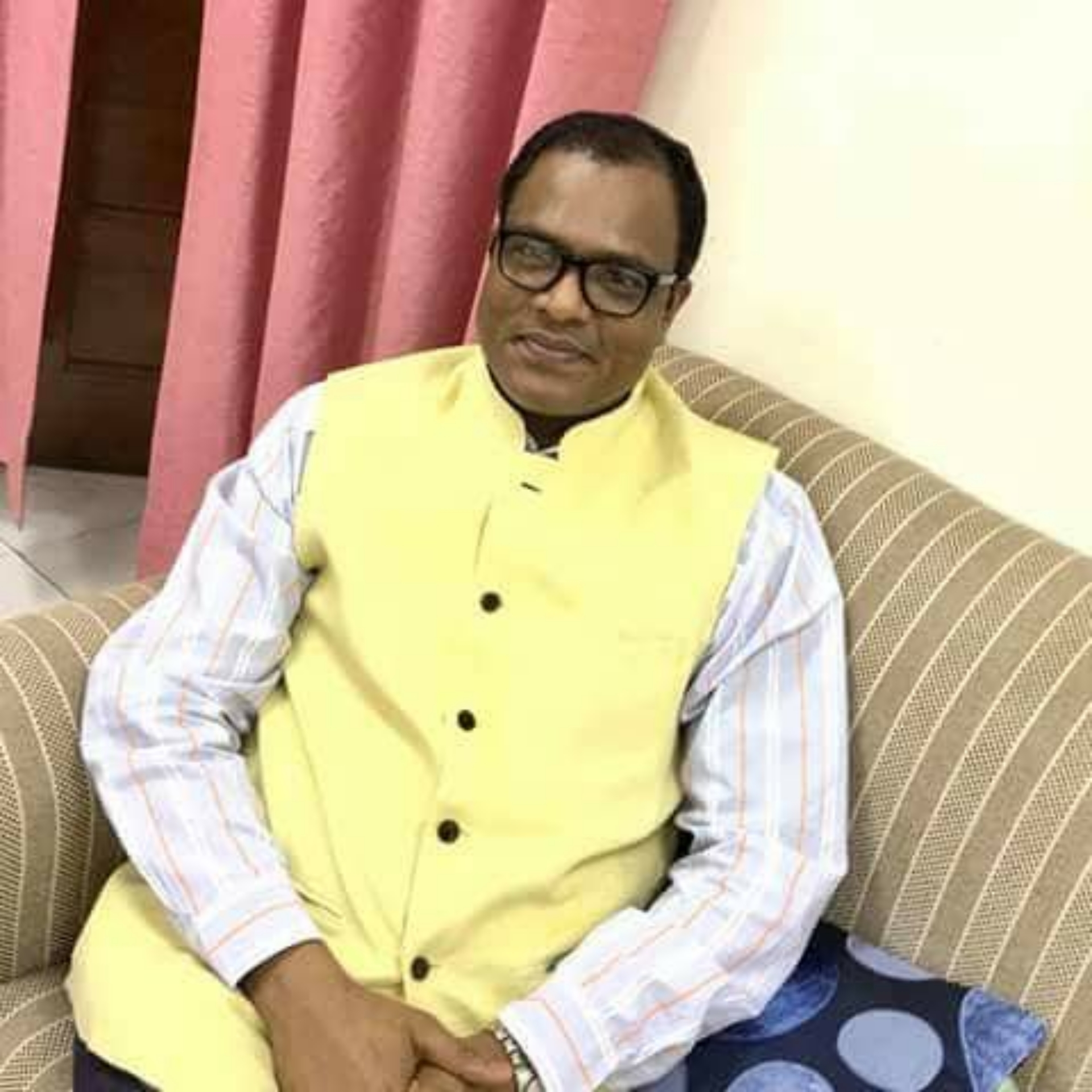

MP of Rajya Sabha for Assam
- In office 15 June 2013 – 14 June 2019
- Succeeded by: Birendra Prasad Baishya
- Constituency: Assam

Personal details
- Born: Santiuse Kujur; 26 October 1973 (age 52) Village Khokhabasti, Udalguri district, Assam
- Party: Bharatiya Janata Party
- Spouse: Mary Aroti Kerketta
- Children: One son Ankit Kujur & Daughter
- Profession: Agiculturist, Trade Unionist, Teacher, Social Worker

Santiuse Kujur (born 26 October 1973 village Khokhabasti, Udalguri district, Assam) is an Indian social worker, politician and a former Member of Parliament (Rajya Sabha) who was elected from Assam, as an INC candidate.

He completed BA from Gauhati University in 1995. He joined Bharatiya Janata Party in 2019.
