= Mangaldoi Lok Sabha constituency =

Former Lok Sabha constituency in Assam

Coordinates: 26.5°N 92.0°E

Mangaldoi
- Former Lok Sabha constituency

Constituency details
- Country: India
- Region: Northeast India
- State: Assam
- Established: 1967
- Abolished: 2023

Mangaldoi was a former Lok Sabha constituency in the Indian state of Assam. After the delimitation, the constituency's area changed, and the name was changed to Darrang–Udalguri.

== Members of Parliament ==
Year	Lok Sabha	Winner	Party
Darrang Lok Sabha Constituency(1952-1967)
1951–52	1st	Kamakhya Prasad Tripathy	Indian National Congress
1957	2nd	Bijoy Chandra Bhagavati	Indian National Congress
1962	3rd	Bijoy Chandra Bhagavati	Indian National Congress
Mangaldoi Lok Sabha Constituency(1967-2023)
1967	4th	Hem Barua	Praja Socialist Party
1971	5th	Dharanidhar Das	Indian National Congress
1977	6th	Hira Lal Patwary	Janata Party
1980	7th	Election not held in Assam	N/A
1985	8th	Saifuddin Ahmed	Asom Gana Parishad
1989	9th	Election not held in Assam	N/A
1991	10th	Probin Deka	Indian National Congress
1996	11th	Birendra Prasad Baishya	Asom Gana Parishad
1998	12th	Madhab Rajbangshi	Indian National Congress
1999	13th	Madhab Rajbangshi	Indian National Congress
2004	14th	Narayan Chandra Borkataky	Bharatiya Janata Party
2009	15th	Ramen Deka	Bharatiya Janata Party
2014	16th	Ramen Deka	Bharatiya Janata Party
2019	17th	Dilip Saikia	Bharatiya Janata Party
Darrang-Udalguri Lok Sabha Constituency(2024-present)
2024	18th	Dilip Saikia	Bharatiya Janata Party

== Election results ==
=== 2019 ===
2019 Indian general elections: Mangaldoi
Party	Candidate	Votes	%	±%
BJP	Dilip Saikia	735,469	48.83	
INC	Bhubaneswar Kalita	5,96,924	39.63	
IND	Pradeep Daimari	1,03,870	6.90	
NOTA	None of the above	18,518	1.23	
VPI	Gandheshwar Mochahari	11,245	0.75	
AITC	Sudhendu Mohan Talukdar	10,640	0.71	
Majority		1,38,545	9.20	
Turnout		15,06,419	83.69	
BJP hold		Swing		

=== General election 2014 ===
2014 Indian general elections: Mangaldoi
Party	Candidate	Votes	%	±%
BJP	Ramen Deka	486,357	39.43	+8.28
INC	Kirip Chaliha	4,63,473	37.57	+12.07
BPF	Sahadev Das	86,347	7.00	−9.31
AIUDF	Paresh Baishya	74,710	6.06	−12.19
AGP	Madhab Rajbangshi	66,467	5.39	+5.39
IND	Shachindra Nath Brahma	12,443	1.01	+1.01
NOTA	None of the above	10,722	0.87	−−−
Majority		22,884	1.86	−3.79
Turnout		12,33,474	81.38	
BJP hold		Swing		

=== General election 2009 ===
2009 Indian general elections: Mangaldoi
Party	Candidate	Votes	%	±%
BJP	Ramen Deka	307,881	31.11	
INC	Madhab Rajbangshi	2,52,032	25.47	
AIUDF	Badiuj Zamal	1,80,430	18.23	
BPF	Dina Nath Das	1,61,219	16.29	
Majority		55,849	5.65	
Turnout		9,89,530	69.85	
BJP hold		Swing		

== See also ==
- Mangaldoi
- List of former constituencies of the Lok Sabha
