= Paniram Brahma =

Indian politician (born 1968)

Paniram Brahma (born 1968) is an Indian politician from the northeastern state of Assam. He was a member of the Assam Legislative Assembly from the Sidli–Chirang Assembly constituency, which is reserved for Scheduled Tribe community, in Chirang district representing the Bodoland People's Front.

Brahma is from Chirang, Assam. He is the son of the late Gajen Brahma. He did his B.A. in 1996 at Gossaigaon College, which is affiliated with Gauhati University, Assam. He declared assets worth Rs.5 crore in his affidavit to the Election Commission of India.

== Career ==
Brahma won the Sidli–Chirang Assembly constituency representing the Bodoland People's Front in the 2026 Assam Legislative Assembly election. He polled 101275 votes and defeated his nearest rival, Ranjit Basumatary of the United People's Party Liberal, by a margin of 38,601 votes.
