= Abdur Rahim Ajmal =

Indian politician

Member of Assam Legislative Assembly
- In office 2014–2021
- Preceded by: Sirajuddin Ajmal
- Succeeded by: Sirajuddin Ajmal
- Constituency: Jamunamukh

Personal details
- Born: 1 July 1986 (age 40) Mumbai, Maharashtra, India
- Party: All India United Democratic Front
- Spouse: Majida Begum
- Parent: Badruddin Ajmal (father)
- Relatives: Abdur Rehman Ajmal (brother); Sirajuddin Ajmal (uncle)
- Education: Darul Uloom Deoband

Abdur Rahim Ajmal (born 1 July 1986) is an Indian politician and businessman. He is a member of the Assam Legislative Assembly for the Jamunamukh constituency.

== Early life and education ==
Ajmal was born on 1 July 1986 in Mumbai, Maharashtra, to a Bengali Muslim family from Hojai in central Assam. The family traces its origins to the Sylhet district of eastern Bengal. His grandfather, Haji Ajmal Ali, was a businessman who moved to Mumbai in 1950 to try to succeed in the perfume industry using the fragrant oud plant. After the opening of the first store in the 1960s, the Ajmal perfume brand quickly grew to become a large brand in the Middle East. Ajmal's father, Badruddin Ajmal, is the founder of the All India United Democratic Front political party and the president of the Jamiat Ulema-e-Assam.

Ajmal completed his Fazil certification from Darul Uloom Deoband in 2008.

== Career ==
Ajmal competed in a 2014 by-election as an All India United Democratic Front candidate for Jamunamukh, defeating Congress candidate Bashir Uddin Laskar by 22959 votes. He maintained his position following the 2016 Assam Legislative Assembly election.

== See also ==
- List of Deobandis
