= Birendra Prasad Baishya =

Indian Politician

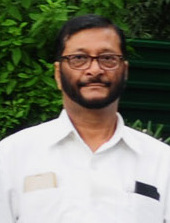

Member of Parliament, Rajya Sabha
- Incumbent
- Assumed office 15 June 2019
- Preceded by: Santiuse Kujur
- Constituency: Assam
- In office 2008–2014
- Succeeded by: Sanjaya Sinh
- Constituency: Assam

Minister of Steel & Mines Government of India
- In office 29 June 1996 – 19 March 1998
- Prime Minister: H. D. Deve Gowda; I. K. Gujral
- Preceded by: H. D. Deve Gowda
- Succeeded by: Naveen Patnaik

Member of Parliament, Lok Sabha
- In office 1996–1998
- Preceded by: Probin Deka
- Succeeded by: Madhab Rajbangshi
- Constituency: Mangaldoi

Personal details
- Born: 29 January 1956 (age 70)
- Party: Asom Gana Parishad
- Education: Darrang College Guwahati University

Birendra Prasad Baishya is an Asom Gana Parishad politician from Assam, India. He was elected in Lok Sabha election in 1996 from Mangaldoi constituency and union minister of Steel and Mines. He was elected to Rajya Sabha in 2008 to 2014 and again in June 2019.

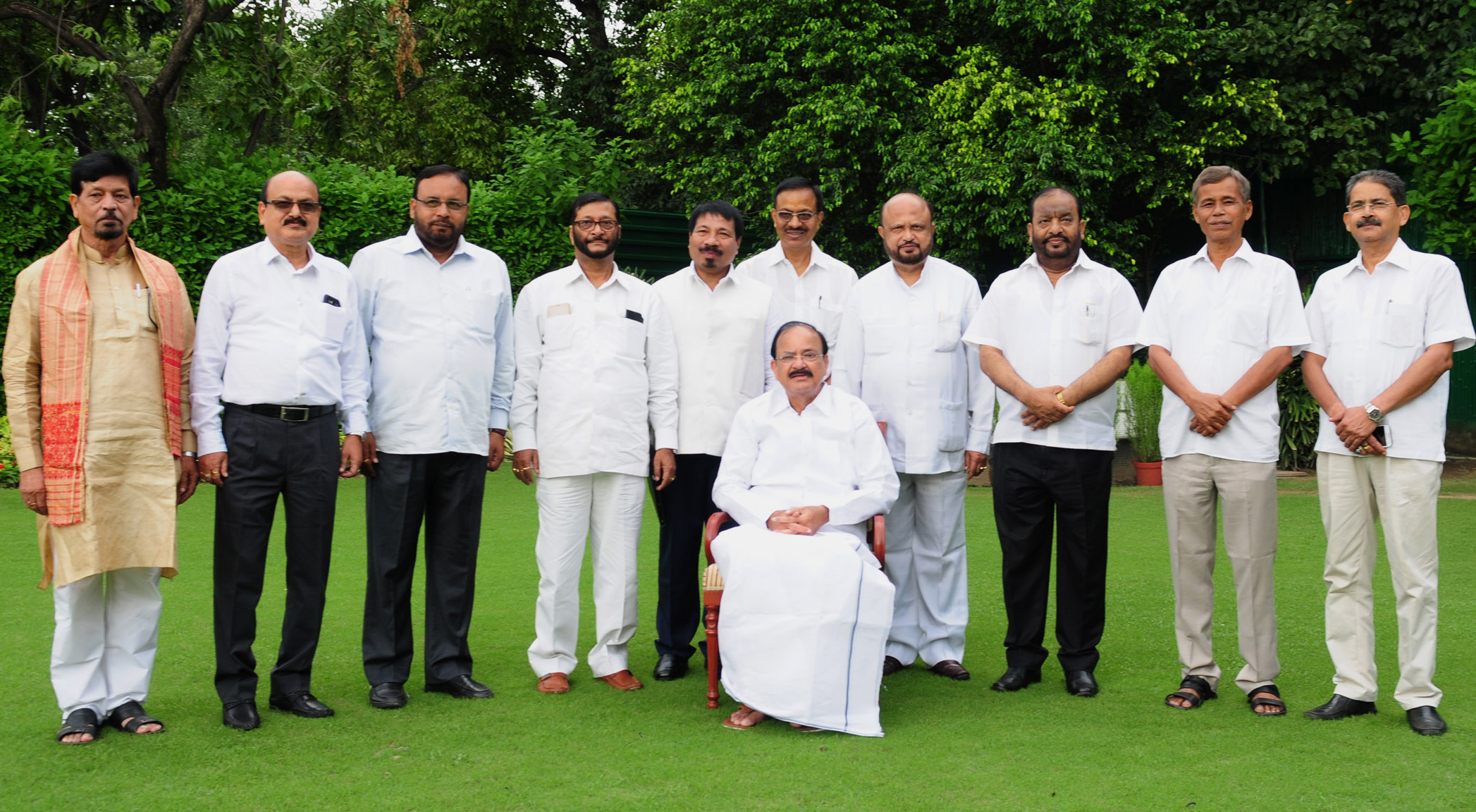
fourth from left side, in middle between Keshab Mahanta and Atul Bora.

Baishya is also President of Indian Weightlifting Federation.

== Election History ==
=== Rajya Sabha ===
Position	Party	Constituency	From	To	Tenure
Member of Parliament, Rajya Sabha (1st Term)	AGP	Assam	10 April 2008	9 April 2014	5 years, 364 days
Member of Parliament, Rajya Sabha (2nd Term)	AGP	Assam	15 June 2019	14 June 2025	5 years, 364 days
Member of Parliament, Rajya Sabha (3rd Term)	AGP	Assam	15 June 2025	14 June 2031	5 years, 364 days
