= Hem Barua =

Indian politician and writer

Member of Parliament, Lok Sabha
- In office 4 March 1967 – 27 December 1970
- Preceded by: Bijoy Chandra Bhagavati
- Succeeded by: Dharanidhar Das
- Constituency: Mangaldoi
- In office 5 April 1957 – 3 March 1967
- Preceded by: Devendra Nath Sharma
- Succeeded by: Dhireswar Kalita
- Constituency: Guwahati

Personal details
- Born: 22 April 1915 Tezpur, Assam Province, British India
- Died: 9 April 1977 (aged 61) Assam, India
- Occupation: Author, Politician

Hem Barua was a prominent Indian writer, poet, and politician from Assam who was one of the pioneers of the modern literary movement in the state.

== Early life ==
Born on 22 April 1915, at Tezpur, Hem Barua obtained his M.A. degree from Calcutta University in 1938 and joined the J.B. College, Jorhat, in 1941 as lecturer in Assamese and English. He left it next year during the Quit India Movement and was imprisoned in 1943. On his release, he joined the B. Borooah College, Guwahati, and later became its Principal.

== Literary career ==
Hem Barua was the author of several books. He became the President of the Asam Sahitya Sabha in its annual session held at Dhubri in 1972 and was regarded as one of the pioneers of modern literary movement in Assam.

== Political career ==
Hem Barua left the Congress in 1948 and became a member of the Socialist party. Later he was elected as the National Executive of the Praja Socialist Party. He was elected to the Lok Sabha from Gauhati in 1957, 1962 and 1967 and from Mangaldoi in 1967. He was the member of the Lok Sabha till December 1970.

== Works ==
- Adhunik Sahitya (1948)
- Sagar Dekhicha? (1954)
- Balichanda (1959)
- San Mihali (1958)
- Cupid Aru Psyche (1959)
- Ranga Karabir Phul (1959)
- Kannaki (1960)
- Ei Git (1961)
- Idle Hours (1962)
- Assamese Literature (1962)
- Sahitya Aru Sahitya (1962)
- Achuphul (1964)
- Man Mayuri (1965)
- Bahagate Pati Jaon Biya (1969)
- Smritir Papari (1970)

Some more books written by Hem Barua are,

- Talxora(Assamese)
- Dak Pokhili(Assamese)ghuj
- Mekong Noi Dekhilu(Assamese)

And the most important of them all, a book on all the ethnic communities and the tribes of North-East India is,_

- The Red River & the Blue Hill in English(1954)

== See also ==
- List of Indian poets
- Assamese literature
- History of Assamese literature
- List of Asam Sahitya Sabha Presidents
- List of Assamese writers with their pen names
- List of hem barau books written in assamese
