= Ram Madhav =

Indian politician

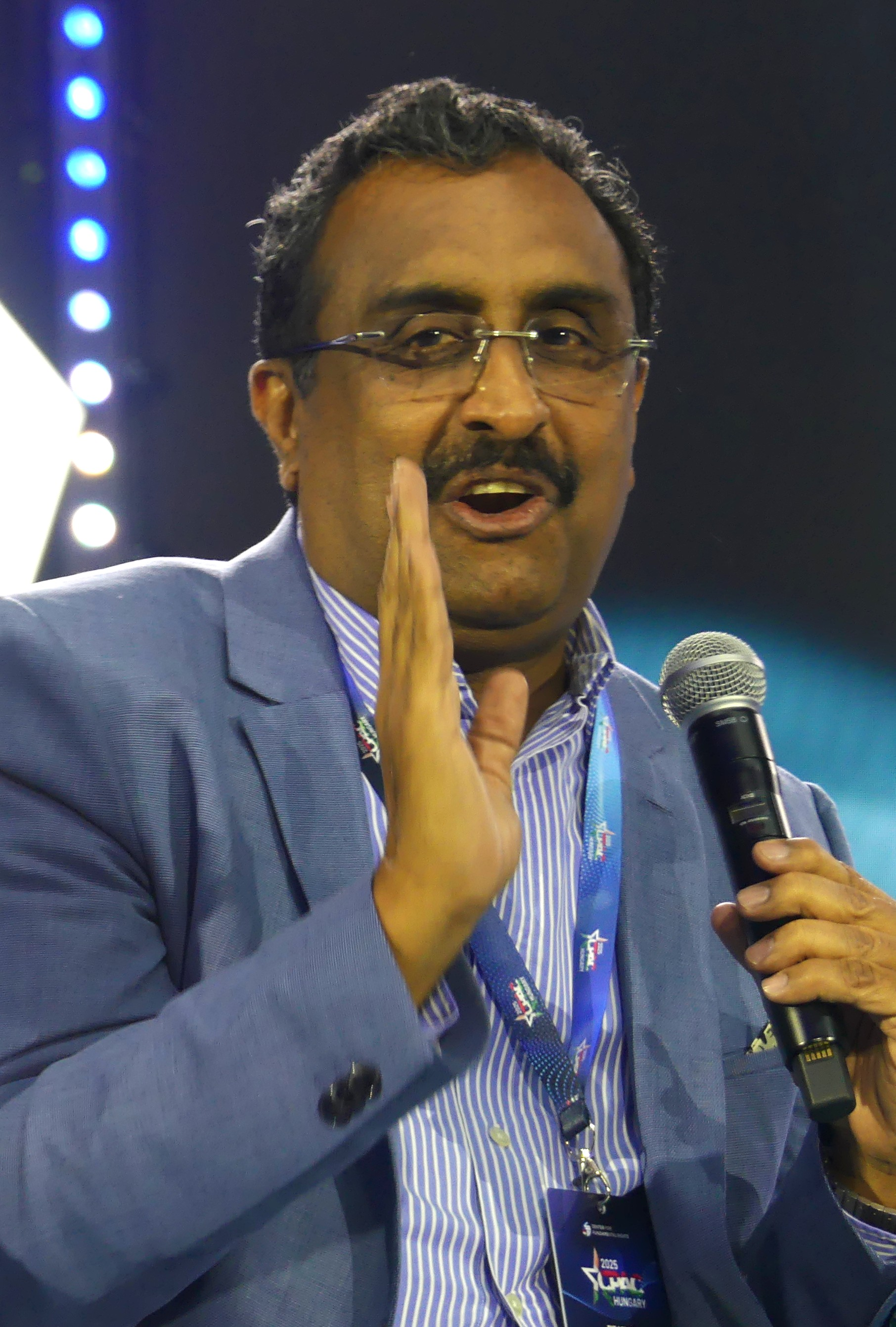
- Madhav in 2025

State Incharge, Tamil Nadu
- Incumbent
- Assumed office 23 September 2026

State Incharge, Jammu and Kashmir
- In office 20 Aug 2024 – 1 October 2024

National General Secretary, Bharatiya Janata Party
- In office 2014–2020
- President: Amit Shah; J. P. Nadda

Personal details
- Born: Ram Madhav; 22 August 1964 (age 62) Amalapuram, Andhra Pradesh, India
- Party: Bharatiya Janata Party
- Education: University of Mysore
- Occupation: Journalist, politician
- Website: rammadhav.in

Varanasi Ram Madhav (born 22 August 1964) is an Indian politician who is currently the National Vice President and previously served as the National General Secretary of the Bharatiya Janata Party. He is a member of the National Executive of the Rashtriya Swayamsevak Sangh and has authored a few books. His latest is Uneasy Neighbours: India and China after Fifty Years of the War.

== Early life ==
Madhav was born in the East Godavari district of Andhra Pradesh on 22 August 1964. Primarily a student of engineering, he earned his Diploma in Electrical Engineering from Andhra Pradesh. He also has a postgraduate degree in Political Science from the University of Mysore, Karnataka. He received his doctoral degree from Nalanda University.

== Political career ==
Madhav's association with the Rashtriya Swayamsevak Sangh (RSS) began during his teenage years. In 1981, he volunteered to become a full-time worker for the RSS and was subsequently assigned to various key positions within the organization. He also served as the editor of Bharatiya Pragna, a monthly magazine published in English by Pragna Bharati, and as the associate editor of Jagriti, a Telugu weekly. Over a career spanning more than 20 years, Madhav worked as a journalist for RSS-sponsored publications and authored over twelve books.

Additionally, he is a founding member of the Governing Council of India Foundation, a think tank based in New Delhi that focuses on the issues, challenges, and opportunities of Indian polity. Currently he serves as the President of India Foundation. He is also a mentor at Vision India Foundation, a New Delhi-based organization dedicated to promoting public leadership among youth.

Madhav was the national spokesperson for the RSS from 2003 to 2014. In 2014, he was seconded to the Bharatiya Janata Party (BJP), where he was appointed as one of its national general secretaries. During his tenure, Madhav is credited with playing a significant role in the rise of the BJP in North East India and in building alliances with regional parties.

External videos
- "Shri Ram Madhav joins BJP in the presence of BJP President Shri Amit Shah - 10th July 2014" Bharatiya Janata Party on YouTube

== Personal views ==
=== Foreign policy ===
He has called for India to take a more "proactive role in the region" in order to check China's One Belt One Road Initiative. He was involved in the BJP's entry into the International Democrat Union, a worldwide grouping of right of centre political parties.

== Reception ==
=== Mehdi Hasan's interview ===
During an appearance on the talk show Head to Head, hosted by Mehdi Hasan, Madhav said that the RSS continued to envision an eventual reunification of India, Pakistan and Bangladesh into Akhand Bharat (undivided India). He stated that this would occur with "popular goodwill" and not with war or annexation. made a comment referring to "your ISIS" in the context of a heated discussion on Hindu nationalism. This phrase sparked controversy, with Madhav later explaining it as a "slip of the tongue" or cross-linguistic error and clarifying that it was a general figure of speech in Hindi, where the word "aapka" (your) is commonly used in such discussions and not meant to target any individual, including Hasan.

== Bibliography ==
- Madhav, Ram (2014). Uneasy Neighbours: India and China after 50 years of the war. New Delhi: Har-Anand Publications. ISBN 978-81-241-1788-0. OCLC 879321209.
- —————— (2020). Because India Comes First: Reflections on Nationalism, Identity and Culture. Chennai: Westland Books. ISBN 978-93-896-4876-8. OCLC 1238089997.
- —————— (2021). The Hindutva Paradigm: Integral Humanism and Quest for a Non-Western Worldview. Chennai: Westland Books. ISBN 978-93-912-3408-9. OCLC 1285771539.
- —————— (2022). Partitioned Freedom. New Delhi: Prabhat Prakashan. ISBN 978-93-945-3478-0. OCLC 1431883292.
- —————— (2024). The Indian Reality: Changing Narratives, Shifting Perceptions. New Delhi: Rupa Publications. ISBN 978-81-969-1134-8. OCLC 1449673267.
