= Binnakandi Assembly constituency =

Assembly constituency of Assam

Binnakandi
- Constituency No. 62 for the Assam Legislative Assembly

Constituency details
- Country: India
- Region: Northeast India
- State: Assam
- District: Hojai
- Lok Sabha constituency: Kaziranga
- Established: 2023
- Reservation: None

Binnakandi Assembly constituency is one of the 126 assembly constituencies of Assam a north east state of India. It was newly formed in 2023.

== Election Results ==
=== 2026 ===
2026 Assam Legislative Assembly election: Binnakandi
Party	Candidate	Votes	%	±%
AIUDF	Badruddin Ajmal	119,721	50.54	
AJP	Rejaul Karim Chowdhury	84,341	35.60	
AGP	Sahabuddin Mazumdar	20,955	8.85	
NOTA	NOTA	2,023	0.85	
Margin of victory		35,380	14.94	
Turnout		236,890		
AIUDF win (new seat)				

== See also ==
- List of constituencies of Assam Legislative Assembly
