= Narayan Chandra Borkataky =

Indian politician

Member of Parliament, Lok Sabha
- Preceded by: Madhab Rajbangshi
- Succeeded by: Ramen Deka
- Constituency: Mangaldoi

Personal details
- Born: 1 April 1943 (age 83) Sibsagar, Assam
- Party: BJP
- Spouse: Abha Borkataky
- Children: 2 daughters
- As of 25 September, 2006

Narayan Chandra Borkataky (born 1 April 1943) is a politician and member of the 14th Lok Sabha of India. He represents the Mangaldoi constituency of Assam and is a member of the Bharatiya Janata Party (BJP) political party.
