= Durga Das Boro =

Indian politician

Member of Assam Legislative Assembly
- Incumbent
- Assumed office 21 May 2021
- Preceded by: Maheswar Baro
- Constituency: Kalaigaon (Vidhan Sabha constituency)

Personal details
- Party: Bodoland People's Front
- Profession: Politician

Durga Das Boro is an Indian politician and member of Bodoland People's Front from Assam. He is an MLA, elected from the Kalaigaon Assembly constituency in the 2021 Assam Legislative Assembly election. Earlier, he was elected from Panery Assembly constituency in the 1985 Assam Legislative Assembly election.
