= Ajmal Foundation =

Non-governmental Organization

- Formation: 2005 (21 years ago)
- Type: Non-profit organization
- Legal status: Private
- Purpose: Charity
- Headquarters: Hojai, Assam, India - 782435
- Region served: Assam
- Services: Modern Education, Relief and rehabilitation, Skill Development, Women Empowerment,Environmental Awareness etc.
- CEO: Badruddin Ajmal
- Board of directors: Dr. Khasrul Islam
- Website: https://ajmalfoundation.com

Ajmal Foundation is a non-governmental organization established in 2005, in the Hojai district of Assam, India, that works for social services including education, health, employment, environment, women empowerment, and poverty management.

== History ==
The NGO was founded by Member of Parliament of India, Badaruddin Ajmal on 2005 at Hojai, Assam, India.

== Overview ==
The Ajmal Foundation established 25 educational institutions, schools, and hospitals. Some of such institutes are Maryam Ajmal Women's College of Science and Technology,Nazir Ajmal Memorial College of Education, Ajmal Law College, and Ajmal College of Arts Commerce and Science. The NGO also runs a free educational coaching programme, "Ajmal Super 40".

Beyond educational activities, the NGO is also doing other charitable works. In 2020, the Ajmal Foundation donated 10 computers to the Asam Sahitya Sabha. In August 2019, the Ajmal Foundation donated Rs 10 Lakh to Assam Chief Minister's Relief Fund for flood victims. During the lockdown period in 2020 for COVID-19 outbreak, Ajmal Foundation donated Rs 2 Lakh to Khalsa Centre (North-East). In 2021, Ajmal Foundation donated Rs 58 lakh to Assam Chief Minister's Relief Fund for COVID-19 vaccination in Assam. The foundation also provides financial aide to ailing journalists and artistes.

The NGO also provided Rs 50,000 to the next of kin of each of the six people who were killed during the Citizenship Amendment Act protests in Assam in 2020.

== Controversies ==
In December 2020 an RSS-backed organization Legal Rights Observatory filed a complaint against Ajmal Foundation with an allegation that the Foundation received funds from international groups linked to terror outfits. Denying the allegation, the Assam State Jamiat Ulema submitted a memorandum citing "Such propaganda has created misunderstanding and wrong conception among common people on Ajmal Foundation to demoralise its creative and charitable activities."

The Director of the Ajmal Foundation Dr. Khasrul Islam admitted that most of the funding to the NGO comes from the United Kingdom but refuted the allegation of any terror link. Dr. Islam said, "Most of our foreign funds come from the UK under strict compliance of the FCRA regulations and are used in social, education and relief works. A false impression is being created about our foundation based on incorrect information."

== Awards ==
- Best NGO-Skill Development Award 2015: The Associated Chambers of Commerce and Industry of India (ASSOCHAM).
