= Probin Deka =

Indian politician

Member of Parliament, Lok Sabha
- In office 1991-1996
- Preceded by: Saifuddin Ahmed
- Succeeded by: Birendra Prasad Baishya
- Constituency: Mangaldoi, Assam

Personal details
- Born: 1 October 1943 (age 82) Mangaldai, Darning district, Assam, British India
- Party: Indian National Congress
- Spouse: Kavita Deka

Probin Deka (1 October 1943) is an Indian politician. He was elected to the Lok Sabha, the lower house of the Indian Parliament, from the Mangaldoi constituency of Assam in 1991 and is a member of the Indian National Congress.
