= Aminul Islam (Indian politician, born 1972) =

Indian politician

Aminul Islam (Born 13 July 1972) is an All India United Democratic Front politician from Assam. He was elected in Assam Legislative Assembly election in 2011 and 2016 from Dhing constituency.

On 6 February 2017, Islam was suspended for 3 days for live telecasting his speech on Facebook in the Assembly.
