= Baokhungri Assembly constituency =

Assembly constituency of Assam

Baokhungri
- Constituency No. 4 for the Assam Legislative Assembly

Constituency details
- Country: India
- Region: Northeast India
- State: Assam
- Division: Lower Assam
- District: Kokrajhar
- Lok Sabha constituency: Kokrajhar
- Established: 2023
- Reservation: None

Member of Legislative Assembly
- 16th Assam Legislative Assembly
- Incumbent Rupam Chandra Roy
- Party: BPF
- Alliance: NDA
- Elected year: 2026

Baokhungri Assembly constituency is one of the 126 assembly constituencies of Assam a north east state of India. It was newly formed in 2023.

== Election Results ==
=== 2026 ===
2026 Assam Legislative Assembly election: Baokhungri
Party	Candidate	Votes	%	±%
BPF	Rupam Chandra Roy	62,677	41.95	
INC	Sapali Marak	38,967	26.08	
UPPL	Pratibha Brahma	21,245	14.22	
IND	Rajib Brahma	13,037	8.82	
GGP	Raajkar Beck	4,393	2.97	
AITC	Udangsri Narzary	2,565	1.72	
IND	Prithviraj Narayan Dev Mech	1,510	1.02	
IND	Sujit Das	1,239	0.84	
IND	Pranob Baroi	702	0.48	
IND	Md Abed Ali Mondal	529	0.36	
IND	Ranjit Sarkar	494	0.33	
Bharatiya Gana Parishad	Shibam Chakroborty	396	0.27	
NOTA	NOTA	1,668	1.12	
Margin of victory		23,710	16.0	
Turnout		1,47,754	89.9	
Rejected ballots				
Registered electors		1,64,314		
BPF win (new seat)				

== See also ==
- List of constituencies of Assam Legislative Assembly
