= Rashid Ahmed Choudhury =

Indian lawyer and politician

- Constituency: Karimganj

Personal details
- Born: Karimganj district, Assam, India
- Party: Indian National Congress
- Education: Post Graduate
- Occupation: Lawyer, Politician
- Profession: Advocate
- Known for: Legal work on citizenship and NRC-related cases in Assam

Rashid Ahmed Choudhury is an Indian lawyer and politician affiliated with the Indian National Congress (INC). He contested the 2024 Lok Sabha election from the Karimganj constituency in Assam but was defeated by the incumbent MP Kripanath Mallah of the Bharatiya Janata Party (BJP).

== Early life and education ==
Rashid Ahmed Choudhury is a postgraduate by education. He is a senior advocate by profession and has served as the former chairman of the Assam Bar Council.

== Political career ==
In the 2024 general elections, Choudhury contested as the INC candidate from Karimganj, a constituency located in the Barak Valley region of Assam. Following delimitation in 2023, Karimganj was converted from a Scheduled Caste reserved seat to a general category seat.

Choudhury secured 526,733 votes (45.93%) but lost to BJP's Kripanath Mallah, who received 545,093 votes (47.53%), with a margin of 18,360 votes.

Following the election, Choudhury filed a petition in the Gauhati High Court alleging irregularities during polling, including booth capturing and discrepancies in the vote count. The court issued summons to Kripanath Mallah, the Returning Officer, and the Election Commission.

Choudhury and the Congress party also alleged a discrepancy of 3,811 extra EVM votes being counted compared to the number reported as polled.

== Professional background ==
Choudhury is a practicing advocate and has worked on cases related to citizenship issues in Assam, including those involving individuals excluded from the National Register of Citizens (NRC) or designated as 'D' (doubtful) voters.

He has been associated with legal support for the Bengali-speaking population of Barak Valley, and his campaign reportedly received support from both Hindu and Muslim legal professionals and civil society organizations in the region.

== Personal life ==
As of 2024, Choudhury is 71 years old. He declared total assets worth ₹4.8 crore in his election affidavit, including ₹59.9 lakh in movable assets and ₹4.2 crore in immovable assets. He reported no liabilities or criminal cases.
