= Madhab Rajbangshi =

Indian politician

Member of Parliament, Lok Sabha
- In office 1998-2004
- Preceded by: Birendra Prasad Baishya
- Succeeded by: Narayan Chandra Borkataky
- Constituency: Mangaldoi, Assam

Personal details
- Born: 7 July 1954 (age 72) Sarabari Barampur, Darrang district, Assam
- Party: Indian National Congress
- Other political affiliations: Asom Gana Parishad
- Spouse: Juri Saharia Rajbangshi

Madhab Rajbangshi (7 July 1954) is an Indian Politician.He was elected to the Lok Sabha the lower house of the Indian Parliament from the Mangaldoi constituency of Assam in 1998 and 1999 and was a member of the Indian National Congress.He joined the Asom Gana Parishad on 18 March 2014.
