= Sidli–Chirang Assembly constituency =

Sidli–Chirang
- Constituency No. 19 for the Assam Legislative Assembly

Constituency details
- Country: India
- Region: Northeast India
- State: Assam
- District: Chirang
- Lok Sabha constituency: Kokrajhar
- Established: 2023
- Reservation: ST

Member of Legislative Assembly
- 16th Assam Legislative Assembly
- Incumbent Paniram Brahma
- Party: BPF
- Alliance: NDA
- Elected year: 2026

Sidli–Chirang Assembly constituency is one of the 126 Assembly constituencies in Chirang district in the North-East Indian state of Assam. It was newly formed in 2023.

== Election Results ==
=== 2026 ===
2026 Assam Legislative Assembly election: Sidli-Chirang
Party	Candidate	Votes	%	±%
BPF	Paniram Brahma	101,275	53.58	
UPPL	Ranjit Basumatary	62,674	33.76	
INC	Matilal Narzary	18,975	10.22	
Voters Party International	Banima Brahma	2,697	1.45	
NOTA	NOTA	3,402	1.8	
Margin of victory		38,601	20.8	
Turnout		1,89,023	84.8	
Rejected ballots				
Registered electors		2,19,013		
BPF win (new seat)				

== See also ==
- List of constituencies of Assam Legislative Assembly
