= Khalilur Rahman Chowdhury (Indian politician) =

Indian politician

Khalilur Rahman Chowdhury was an Indian politician from the state of Assam.

He was elected to the Assam Legislative Assembly, the lower house of Indian state, from Jamunamukh Vidhan Sabha constituency from 1996 to 2006. He was initially a member of the Asom Gana Parishad. Later he joined Indian National Congress.

He died in July 2020 from COVID-19, aged 94.
