= Bijuli Kalita Medhi =

Indian politician

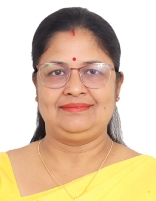

Member of the Lok Sabha
- Incumbent
- Assumed office 2024
- Preceded by: Queen Oja
- Constituency: Guwahati

Personal details
- Born: 21 May 1978 (age 48)
- Party: Bharatiya Janata Party
- Occupation: Politician

Bijuli Kalita Medhi (born 21 May 1978) is an Indian politician and member of the Lok Sabha from Guwahati Lok Sabha constituency. She won by a margin of 251,090 votes against Mira Borthakur Goswami in the 2024 Indian general election. She is a member of the Bharatiya Janata Party (BJP).

== Political career ==
Bijuli Kalita Medhi became a member of the party in Guwahati, Assam in 2013. Her political career took a significant turn that year when she decided to run in the GMC council elections from ward number 23.

She was the Vice President of the Assam Pradesh BJP and has previously served as the President of the Mohila Morcha, BJP Assam.

== See also ==
- 18th Lok Sabha
- Bharatiya Janata Party
- Guwahati Lok Sabha constituency
