= Amarsing Tisso =

Indian politician

Member of Parliament, Lok Sabha
- Incumbent
- Assumed office 2024
- Constituency: Diphu

Personal details
- Party: Bharatiya Janata Party
- Occupation: Politician

Amarsing Tisso is an Indian politician who was elected to the Lok Sabha from Diphu Lok Sabha constituency in the 2024 Indian general elections. He is a member of the Bharatiya Janata Party.

== See also ==
- 18th Lok Sabha
- Bharatiya Janata Party
- Diphu Lok Sabha constituency
