= Devasish Sharma =

Indian politician

Member of Parliament
- Incumbent
- Assumed office 9 October 2026
- Preceded by: Pradyut Bordoloi
- Constituency: Nagaon

Personal details
- Born: 23 February 1967 (age 59) Jorhat, Assam, India
- Party: Bharatiya Janata Party
- Education: Ramjas College (BA); Delhi University; Bharatiya Vidya Bhavan (PG Diploma) New Delhi
- Profession: IAS Officer (Retired); Politician

Devasish Sharma is an Indian politician and a former Indian Administrative Service (IAS) Officer. He serves as a member of Lok Sabha representing the Nagaon Lok Sabha constituency since 2026.
