= List of longest-serving members of the Union Council of Ministers =

Longer serving Indian Central Ministers

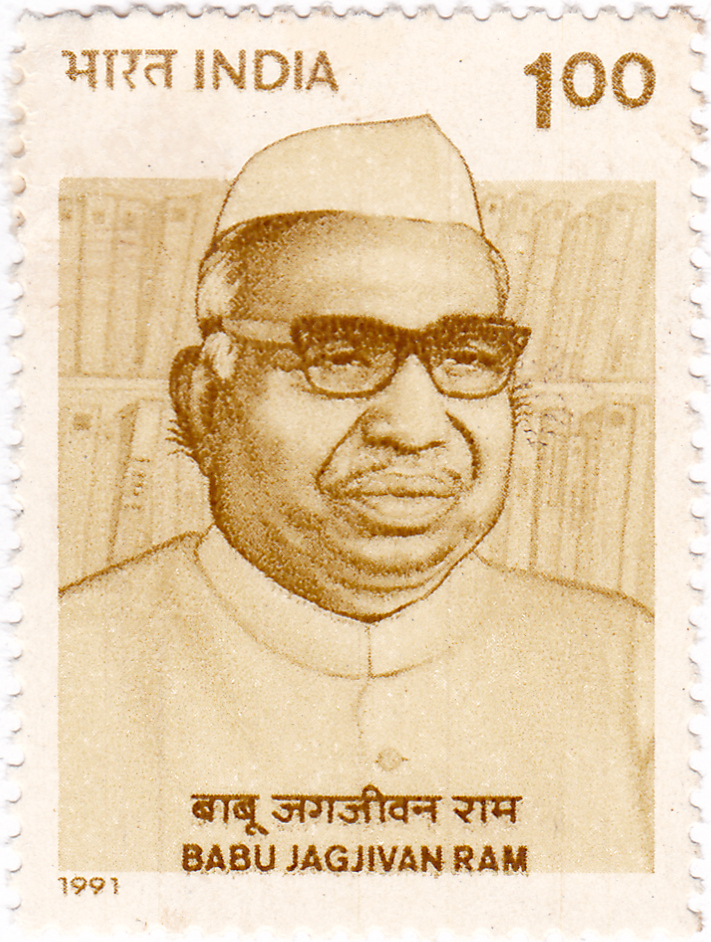
Jagjivan Ram is India's longest serving Union Minister

The following is a list of the longest-serving ministers of the Union Council of Ministers of India, listing those individuals who served at least a decade in Union ministries. As of October 2026, 90 Union ministers have served for at least 10 years in office, including 20 who served for 15 years or more and five who served for at least 20 years. As ministers often hold multiple portfolios during their respective tenures, only their final portfolios and the periods they served in their ranks are displayed here. Party affiliations are those held during the tenure (s) in office of each respective officeholder. Since the first Union Council was established in 1947, its members have been categorised into the following five ranks (in descending order):

- The Prime Minister
- The Deputy Prime Minister (if one has been appointed)
- Cabinet Ministers
- Ministers of State (without membership of the Union Cabinet), in the following sub-categories:
  - Ministers of State with Cabinet rank
  - Ministers of State with Independent Charge of ministries/portfolios
  - Ministers of State, reporting to the Prime Minister or to a Cabinet Minister
- Deputy Ministers (equivalent to Parliamentary Secretaries). Deputy Ministers have not been appointed since 1993.

Ministers in the first three ranks comprise the Union Cabinet, which is the supreme decision-making body of the nation per Article 75 of the Constitution. Regardless of rank, any member of the Union Council is a Union minister, per the Salaries and Allowances of Ministers Act 1952.

When multiple Union ministers have been sworn into office from the same date, they are listed in the order they were administered their oaths of office and secrecy, beginning with the Prime Minister. Union ministers who have served in multiple Union Ministries are listed in order of seniority, i.e. a Cabinet Minister in one Union ministry who remains a Cabinet Minister in a subsequent Union ministry is listed before a Minister of State who was subsequently promoted to the rank of a Cabinet Minister.

== List ==
Key

- ^{†} Died in office

#	Minister	Portrait	Final or current ministerial rank (final/current portfolio held)	Ministries served	Party affiliations	Ranks	Start of tenure	End of tenure	Time in office	Overall tenure
1	Jagjivan Ram (1908 – 1986)		Deputy Prime Minister (Deputy Prime Minister and Minister of Defence)	Nehru I Nehru II; Nehru III; Nehru IV; Indira I Indira II; Desai	INC (1947–1969); INC (R) (1969–1977); CFD (1977); JP (1977–1979)	Cabinet Minister	15 August 1947	31 August 1963	16 years and 16 days	29 years, 4 months and 5 days (Note: Not including service as cabinet minister during the Interim Government of India from 2 September 1946 – 15 August 1947 (11 months and 13 days).)
1	Jagjivan Ram (1908 – 1986)		Deputy Prime Minister (Deputy Prime Minister and Minister of Defence)	Nehru I Nehru II; Nehru III; Nehru IV; Indira I Indira II; Desai	INC (1947–1969); INC (R) (1969–1977); CFD (1977); JP (1977–1979)	Cabinet Minister	24 January 1966	2 February 1977	11 years and 9 days	29 years, 4 months and 5 days
1	Jagjivan Ram (1908 – 1986)		Deputy Prime Minister (Deputy Prime Minister and Minister of Defence)	Nehru I Nehru II; Nehru III; Nehru IV; Indira I Indira II; Desai	INC (1947–1969); INC (R) (1969–1977); CFD (1977); JP (1977–1979)	Cabinet Minister	28 March 1977	24 January 1979	1 year, 9 months and 27 days	29 years, 4 months and 5 days
1	Jagjivan Ram (1908 – 1986)		Deputy Prime Minister (Deputy Prime Minister and Minister of Defence)	Nehru I Nehru II; Nehru III; Nehru IV; Indira I Indira II; Desai	INC (1947–1969); INC (R) (1969–1977); CFD (1977); JP (1977–1979)	Deputy Prime Minister	24 January 1979	28 July 1979	5 months and 13 days	29 years, 4 months and 5 days
2	Swaran Singh (1907 – 1994)		Cabinet Minister (Minister of Defence)	Nehru II; Nehru III; Nehru IV; Nanda I Shastri; Nanda II; Indira I Indira II	INC (1952–1969); INC (R) (1969–1975)	Cabinet Minister	13 May 1952	1 December 1975		23 years, 6 months and 18 days
3	Satya Narayan Sinha (1900 – 1983)		Cabinet Minister (Minister of Information and Broadcasting and Communications)	Nehru I Nehru II; Nehru III; Nehru IV; Nanda I Shastri; Nanda II; Indira I	INC (1948–1969); INC (O) (1969–1971)	Deputy Minister	1 October 1948	26 February 1949	4 months and 25 days	22 years, 3 months and 20 days
3	Satya Narayan Sinha (1900 – 1983)		Cabinet Minister (Minister of Information and Broadcasting and Communications)	Nehru I Nehru II; Nehru III; Nehru IV; Nanda I Shastri; Nanda II; Indira I	INC (1948–1969); INC (O) (1969–1971)	Minister of State	26 February 1949	25 January 1950	10 months and 30 days	22 years, 3 months and 20 days
3	Satya Narayan Sinha (1900 – 1983)		Cabinet Minister (Minister of Information and Broadcasting and Communications)	Nehru I Nehru II; Nehru III; Nehru IV; Nanda I Shastri; Nanda II; Indira I	INC (1948–1969); INC (O) (1969–1971)	Minister of State	31 January 1950	6 May 1950	3 months and 6 days	22 years, 3 months and 20 days
3	Satya Narayan Sinha (1900 – 1983)		Cabinet Minister (Minister of Information and Broadcasting and Communications)	Nehru I Nehru II; Nehru III; Nehru IV; Nanda I Shastri; Nanda II; Indira I	INC (1948–1969); INC (O) (1969–1971)	Minister of State	13 May 1950	10 April 1962	11 years, 9 months and 23 days	22 years, 3 months and 20 days
3	Satya Narayan Sinha (1900 – 1983)		Cabinet Minister (Minister of Information and Broadcasting and Communications)	Nehru I Nehru II; Nehru III; Nehru IV; Nanda I Shastri; Nanda II; Indira I	INC (1948–1969); INC (O) (1969–1971)	Cabinet Minister	10 April 1962	8 March 1971	8 years, 10 months and 26 days	22 years, 3 months and 20 days
4	Raj Bahadur (1912 – 1990)		Cabinet Minister (Minister of Tourism and Civil Aviation)	Nehru I Nehru II; Nehru III; Nehru IV; Nanda I Shastri; Nanda II; Indira I Indira II	INC (1951–1969); INC (R) (1969–1976)	Deputy Minister	29 May 1951	13 May 1952	11 months and 14 days	21 years, 5 months and 25 days
4	Raj Bahadur (1912 – 1990)		Cabinet Minister (Minister of Tourism and Civil Aviation)	Nehru I Nehru II; Nehru III; Nehru IV; Nanda I Shastri; Nanda II; Indira I Indira II	INC (1951–1969); INC (R) (1969–1976)	Deputy Minister	4 June 1952	14 February 1956	3 years, 8 months and 10 days	21 years, 5 months and 25 days
4	Raj Bahadur (1912 – 1990)		Cabinet Minister (Minister of Tourism and Civil Aviation)	Nehru I Nehru II; Nehru III; Nehru IV; Nanda I Shastri; Nanda II; Indira I Indira II	INC (1951–1969); INC (R) (1969–1976)	Minister of State (Note: With Cabinet rank from 14 February 1956 – 17 April 1957.)	14 February 1956	13 March 1967	11 years and 27 days	21 years, 5 months and 25 days
4	Raj Bahadur (1912 – 1990)		Cabinet Minister (Minister of Tourism and Civil Aviation)	Nehru I Nehru II; Nehru III; Nehru IV; Nanda I Shastri; Nanda II; Indira I Indira II	INC (1951–1969); INC (R) (1969–1976)	Cabinet Minister	18 March 1971	8 November 1973	2 years, 7 months and 21 days	21 years, 5 months and 25 days
4	Raj Bahadur (1912 – 1990)		Cabinet Minister (Minister of Tourism and Civil Aviation)	Nehru I Nehru II; Nehru III; Nehru IV; Nanda I Shastri; Nanda II; Indira I Indira II	INC (1951–1969); INC (R) (1969–1976)	Cabinet Minister	9 November 1973	22 December 1976	3 years, 1 month and 13 days	21 years, 5 months and 25 days
5	Pranab Mukherjee (1935 – 2020)		Cabinet Minister (Minister of Finance)	Indira III; Indira IV; Rao; Manmohan I Manmohan II	INC (R) (1973–1977); INC (1980–1984, 1993–1996, 2004–2012)	Deputy Minister	5 February 1973	10 October 1974	1 year, 8 months and 5 days	20 years, 3 months and 18 days
5	Pranab Mukherjee (1935 – 2020)		Cabinet Minister (Minister of Finance)	Indira III; Indira IV; Rao; Manmohan I Manmohan II	INC (R) (1973–1977); INC (1980–1984, 1993–1996, 2004–2012)	Minister of State	10 October 1974	24 March 1977	2 years, 5 months and 14 days	20 years, 3 months and 18 days
5	Pranab Mukherjee (1935 – 2020)		Cabinet Minister (Minister of Finance)	Indira III; Indira IV; Rao; Manmohan I Manmohan II	INC (R) (1973–1977); INC (1980–1984, 1993–1996, 2004–2012)	Cabinet Minister	14 January 1980	31 December 1984	4 years, 11 months and 17 days	20 years, 3 months and 18 days
5	Pranab Mukherjee (1935 – 2020)		Cabinet Minister (Minister of Finance)	Indira III; Indira IV; Rao; Manmohan I Manmohan II	INC (R) (1973–1977); INC (1980–1984, 1993–1996, 2004–2012)	Cabinet Minister	17 January 1993	9 July 1993	5 months and 22 days	20 years, 3 months and 18 days
5	Pranab Mukherjee (1935 – 2020)		Cabinet Minister (Minister of Finance)	Indira III; Indira IV; Rao; Manmohan I Manmohan II	INC (R) (1973–1977); INC (1980–1984, 1993–1996, 2004–2012)	Cabinet Minister	31 August 1993	16 May 1996	2 years, 8 months and 16 days	20 years, 3 months and 18 days
5	Pranab Mukherjee (1935 – 2020)		Cabinet Minister (Minister of Finance)	Indira III; Indira IV; Rao; Manmohan I Manmohan II	INC (R) (1973–1977); INC (1980–1984, 1993–1996, 2004–2012)	Cabinet Minister	22 May 2004	26 June 2012	8 years, 1 month and 4 days	20 years, 3 months and 18 days
6	Kotha Raghuramaiah (1912 – 1979)		Cabinet Minister (Minister of Tourism, Civil Aviation and Parliamentary Affairs)	Nehru III; Nehru IV; Nanda I Shastri; Nanda II; Indira I Indira II	INC (1957–1969); INC (R) (1969–1977)	Deputy Minister	21 May 1957	10 April 1962	4 years, 10 months and 20 days	19 years, 9 months and 26 days
6	Kotha Raghuramaiah (1912 – 1979)		Cabinet Minister (Minister of Tourism, Civil Aviation and Parliamentary Affairs)	Nehru III; Nehru IV; Nanda I Shastri; Nanda II; Indira I Indira II	INC (1957–1969); INC (R) (1969–1977)	Minister of State	16 April 1962	27 June 1970	8 years, 2 months and 11 days	19 years, 9 months and 26 days
6	Kotha Raghuramaiah (1912 – 1979)		Cabinet Minister (Minister of Tourism, Civil Aviation and Parliamentary Affairs)	Nehru III; Nehru IV; Nanda I Shastri; Nanda II; Indira I Indira II	INC (1957–1969); INC (R) (1969–1977)	Cabinet Minister	27 June 1970	24 March 1977	6 years, 8 months and 25 days	19 years, 9 months and 26 days
7	B. Shankaranand (1925 – 2009)		Cabinet Minister (Minister of Health and Family Welfare)	Indira II; Indira III; Rajiv II; Rao	INC (R) (1971–1977); INC (1980–1987, 1988–1989, 1991–1994)	Deputy Minister	2 May 1971	24 March 1977	5 years, 10 months and 22 days	18 years, 5 months and 5 days
7	B. Shankaranand (1925 – 2009)		Cabinet Minister (Minister of Health and Family Welfare)	Indira II; Indira III; Rajiv II; Rao	INC (R) (1971–1977); INC (1980–1987, 1988–1989, 1991–1994)	Cabinet Minister	14 January 1980	31 October 1984	4 years, 9 months and 17 days	18 years, 5 months and 5 days
7	B. Shankaranand (1925 – 2009)		Cabinet Minister (Minister of Health and Family Welfare)	Indira II; Indira III; Rajiv II; Rao	INC (R) (1971–1977); INC (1980–1987, 1988–1989, 1991–1994)	Cabinet Minister	4 November 1984	22 August 1987	2 years, 9 months and 18 days	18 years, 5 months and 5 days
7	B. Shankaranand (1925 – 2009)		Cabinet Minister (Minister of Health and Family Welfare)	Indira II; Indira III; Rajiv II; Rao	INC (R) (1971–1977); INC (1980–1987, 1988–1989, 1991–1994)	Cabinet Minister	25 June 1988	2 December 1989	1 year, 5 months and 7 days	18 years, 5 months and 5 days
7	B. Shankaranand (1925 – 2009)		Cabinet Minister (Minister of Health and Family Welfare)	Indira II; Indira III; Rajiv II; Rao	INC (R) (1971–1977); INC (1980–1987, 1988–1989, 1991–1994)	Cabinet Minister	21 June 1991	22 December 1994	3 years, 6 months and 1 day	18 years, 5 months and 5 days
8	P. Chidambaram (b. 1945)		Cabinet Minister (Minister of Finance)	Rajiv II; Rao; Gujral; Manmohan I Manmohan II	INC (1985–1996, 2004–2014); TMC(M) (1996–2001); CJP (2001–2004)	Deputy Minister	25 September 1985	20 January 1986	3 months and 26 days	18 years, 2 months and 2 days
8	P. Chidambaram (b. 1945)		Cabinet Minister (Minister of Finance)	Rajiv II; Rao; Gujral; Manmohan I Manmohan II	INC (1985–1996, 2004–2014); TMC(M) (1996–2001); CJP (2001–2004)	Minister of State (Note: With Independent charge from 21 June 1991 – 7 July 1992.)	20 January 1986	2 December 1989	3 years, 10 months and 12 days	18 years, 2 months and 2 days
8	P. Chidambaram (b. 1945)		Cabinet Minister (Minister of Finance)	Rajiv II; Rao; Gujral; Manmohan I Manmohan II	INC (1985–1996, 2004–2014); TMC(M) (1996–2001); CJP (2001–2004)	Minister of State	21 June 1991	9 July 1992	1 year and 18 days	18 years, 2 months and 2 days
8	P. Chidambaram (b. 1945)		Cabinet Minister (Minister of Finance)	Rajiv II; Rao; Gujral; Manmohan I Manmohan II	INC (1985–1996, 2004–2014); TMC(M) (1996–2001); CJP (2001–2004)	Minister of State	10 February 1995	3 April 1996	1 year, 1 month and 24 days	18 years, 2 months and 2 days
8	P. Chidambaram (b. 1945)		Cabinet Minister (Minister of Finance)	Rajiv II; Rao; Gujral; Manmohan I Manmohan II	INC (1985–1996, 2004–2014); TMC(M) (1996–2001); CJP (2001–2004)	Cabinet Minister	1 June 1996	21 April 1997	10 months and 20 days	18 years, 2 months and 2 days
8	P. Chidambaram (b. 1945)		Cabinet Minister (Minister of Finance)	Rajiv II; Rao; Gujral; Manmohan I Manmohan II	INC (1985–1996, 2004–2014); TMC(M) (1996–2001); CJP (2001–2004)	Cabinet Minister	1 May 1997	19 March 1998	10 months and 18 days	18 years, 2 months and 2 days
8	P. Chidambaram (b. 1945)		Cabinet Minister (Minister of Finance)	Rajiv II; Rao; Gujral; Manmohan I Manmohan II	INC (1985–1996, 2004–2014); TMC(M) (1996–2001); CJP (2001–2004)	Cabinet Minister	22 May 2004	26 May 2014	10 years and 4 days	18 years, 2 months and 2 days
9	Indira Gandhi (1917–1984)		Prime Minister	Shastri; Nanda II; Indira I Indira II; Indira III	INC (1947–1969, 1977–1984); INC (R) (1969–1977)	Cabinet Minister	2 July 1964	24 January 1966	1 year, 6 months and 22 days	17 years, 6 months and 9 days
9	Indira Gandhi (1917–1984)		Prime Minister	Shastri; Nanda II; Indira I Indira II; Indira III	INC (1947–1969, 1977–1984); INC (R) (1969–1977)	Prime Minister	24 January 1966	24 March 1977	11 years and 2 months	17 years, 6 months and 9 days
9	Indira Gandhi (1917–1984)		Prime Minister	Shastri; Nanda II; Indira I Indira II; Indira III	INC (1947–1969, 1977–1984); INC (R) (1969–1977)	Prime Minister	14 January 1980	31 October 1984^{†}	4 years, 9 months and 17 days	17 years, 6 months and 9 days
10	Rao Inderjit Singh (b. 1951)		Minister of State (Statistics, Programme Implementation, Planning and Culture)	Manmohan I Modi I Modi II; Modi III	INC (2004–2009); BJP (2014–present)	Minister of State	22 May 2004	22 May 2009	5 years	17 years and 5 months (Note: As of 26 October 2026.)
10	Rao Inderjit Singh (b. 1951)		Minister of State (Statistics, Programme Implementation, Planning and Culture)	Manmohan I Modi I Modi II; Modi III	INC (2004–2009); BJP (2014–present)	Minister of State (Note: With Independent charge from 26 May 2014.)	26 May 2014	present	12 years, 5 months and 1 day	17 years and 5 months
11	Jaisukhlal Hathi (1909–1982)		Cabinet Minister (Minister of Labour and Rehabilitation)	Nehru II; Nehru III; Nehru IV; Nanda I Shastri; Nanda II; Indira I	INC (1952–1969)	Deputy Minister	12 September 1952	10 April 1962	9 years, 6 months and 29 days	17 years, 1 month and 26 days
11	Jaisukhlal Hathi (1909–1982)		Cabinet Minister (Minister of Labour and Rehabilitation)	Nehru II; Nehru III; Nehru IV; Nanda I Shastri; Nanda II; Indira I	INC (1952–1969)	Minister of State	16 April 1962	13 March 1967	4 years, 10 months and 25 days	17 years, 1 month and 26 days
11	Jaisukhlal Hathi (1909–1982)		Cabinet Minister (Minister of Labour and Rehabilitation)	Nehru II; Nehru III; Nehru IV; Nanda I Shastri; Nanda II; Indira I	INC (1952–1969)	Cabinet Minister	13 March 1967	15 November 1969	2 years, 8 months and 2 days	17 years, 1 month and 26 days
12	Jawaharlal Nehru (1889–1964)		Prime Minister	Nehru I Nehru II; Nehru III; Nehru IV	INC (1947–1964)	Prime Minister	15 August 1947	27 May 1964^{†}		16 years, 9 months and 12 days
13	Vidya Charan Shukla (1927 – 2013)		Cabinet Minister (Minister of Water Resources and Parliamentary Affairs)	Indira I Indira II; Indira III; Indira IV; Chandra Shekhar; Rao	INC (1966–1969, 1980–1981, 1990–1991, 1991–1996); INC (R) (1969–1977)	Deputy Minister	24 January 1966	13 March 1967	1 year, 1 month and 17 days	16 years, 9 months and 6 days
13	Vidya Charan Shukla (1927 – 2013)		Cabinet Minister (Minister of Water Resources and Parliamentary Affairs)	Indira I Indira II; Indira III; Indira IV; Chandra Shekhar; Rao	INC (1966–1969, 1980–1981, 1990–1991, 1991–1996); INC (R) (1969–1977)	Minister of State	13 March 1967	24 March 1977	10 years and 11 days	16 years, 9 months and 6 days
13	Vidya Charan Shukla (1927 – 2013)		Cabinet Minister (Minister of Water Resources and Parliamentary Affairs)	Indira I Indira II; Indira III; Indira IV; Chandra Shekhar; Rao	INC (1966–1969, 1980–1981, 1990–1991, 1991–1996); INC (R) (1969–1977)	Cabinet Minister	8 June 1980	19 March 1981	9 months and 11 days	16 years, 9 months and 6 days
13	Vidya Charan Shukla (1927 – 2013)		Cabinet Minister (Minister of Water Resources and Parliamentary Affairs)	Indira I Indira II; Indira III; Indira IV; Chandra Shekhar; Rao	INC (1966–1969, 1980–1981, 1990–1991, 1991–1996); INC (R) (1969–1977)	Cabinet Minister	21 November 1990	20 February 1991	2 months and 30 days	16 years, 9 months and 6 days
13	Vidya Charan Shukla (1927 – 2013)		Cabinet Minister (Minister of Water Resources and Parliamentary Affairs)	Indira I Indira II; Indira III; Indira IV; Chandra Shekhar; Rao	INC (1966–1969, 1980–1981, 1990–1991, 1991–1996); INC (R) (1969–1977)	Cabinet Minister	21 June 1991	17 January 1996	4 years, 6 months and 27 days	16 years, 9 months and 6 days
14	Ram Vilas Paswan (1946 – 2020)		Cabinet Minister (Minister of Consumer Affairs, Food and Public Distribution)	Vishwanath; Deve Gowda; Gujral; Vajpayee III; Modi I Modi II	JD (1989–1990, 1996–1998); JD (U) (1999–2000); LJP (2000–2002, 2004–2020)	Cabinet Minister	6 December 1989	10 November 1990	11 months and 4 days	16 years, 7 months and 19 days
14	Ram Vilas Paswan (1946 – 2020)		Cabinet Minister (Minister of Consumer Affairs, Food and Public Distribution)	Vishwanath; Deve Gowda; Gujral; Vajpayee III; Modi I Modi II	JD (1989–1990, 1996–1998); JD (U) (1999–2000); LJP (2000–2002, 2004–2020)	Cabinet Minister	1 June 1996	19 March 1998	1 year, 9 months and 18 days	16 years, 7 months and 19 days
14	Ram Vilas Paswan (1946 – 2020)		Cabinet Minister (Minister of Consumer Affairs, Food and Public Distribution)	Vishwanath; Deve Gowda; Gujral; Vajpayee III; Modi I Modi II	JD (1989–1990, 1996–1998); JD (U) (1999–2000); LJP (2000–2002, 2004–2020)	Cabinet Minister	13 October 1999	29 April 2002	2 years, 6 months and 16 days	16 years, 7 months and 19 days
14	Ram Vilas Paswan (1946 – 2020)		Cabinet Minister (Minister of Consumer Affairs, Food and Public Distribution)	Vishwanath; Deve Gowda; Gujral; Vajpayee III; Modi I Modi II	JD (1989–1990, 1996–1998); JD (U) (1999–2000); LJP (2000–2002, 2004–2020)	Cabinet Minister	22 May 2004	22 May 2009	5 years	16 years, 7 months and 19 days
14	Ram Vilas Paswan (1946 – 2020)		Cabinet Minister (Minister of Consumer Affairs, Food and Public Distribution)	Vishwanath; Deve Gowda; Gujral; Vajpayee III; Modi I Modi II	JD (1989–1990, 1996–1998); JD (U) (1999–2000); LJP (2000–2002, 2004–2020)	Cabinet Minister	26 May 2014	8 October 2020^{†}	6 years, 4 months and 12 days	16 years, 7 months and 19 days
15	Shah Nawaz Khan (1914–1983)		Minister of State (Minister of Agriculture and Irrigation)	Nehru II; Nehru III; Nehru IV; Nanda I Shastri; Nanda II; Indira I Indira II	INC (1952–1967); INC (R) (1971–1977)	Deputy Minister	20 September 1956	9 June 1964	7 years, 8 months and 20 days	16 years, 4 months and 8 days
15	Shah Nawaz Khan (1914–1983)		Minister of State (Minister of Agriculture and Irrigation)	Nehru II; Nehru III; Nehru IV; Nanda I Shastri; Nanda II; Indira I Indira II	INC (1952–1967); INC (R) (1971–1977)	Deputy Minister	15 June 1964	13 March 1967	2 years, 8 months and 26 days	16 years, 4 months and 8 days
15	Shah Nawaz Khan (1914–1983)		Minister of State (Minister of Agriculture and Irrigation)	Nehru II; Nehru III; Nehru IV; Nanda I Shastri; Nanda II; Indira I Indira II	INC (1952–1967); INC (R) (1971–1977)	Minister of State	2 May 1971	24 March 1977	5 years, 10 months and 22 days	16 years, 4 months and 8 days
16	Gulzarilal Nanda (1898–1998)		Cabinet Minister (Minister of Railways)	Nehru I Nehru II; Nehru III; Nehru IV; Nanda I Shastri; Nanda II; Indira I Indira II	INC (1951–1966); INC (R) (1970–1971)	Cabinet Minister	24 September 1951	27 May 1964	12 years, 8 months and 3 days	16 years, 2 months and 17 days
16	Gulzarilal Nanda (1898–1998)		Cabinet Minister (Minister of Railways)	Nehru I Nehru II; Nehru III; Nehru IV; Nanda I Shastri; Nanda II; Indira I Indira II	INC (1951–1966); INC (R) (1970–1971)	Acting Prime Minister	27 May 1964	9 June 1964	13 days	16 years, 2 months and 17 days
16	Gulzarilal Nanda (1898–1998)		Cabinet Minister (Minister of Railways)	Nehru I Nehru II; Nehru III; Nehru IV; Nanda I Shastri; Nanda II; Indira I Indira II	INC (1951–1966); INC (R) (1970–1971)	Cabinet Minister	9 June 1964	11 January 1966	1 year, 7 months and 2 days	16 years, 2 months and 17 days
16	Gulzarilal Nanda (1898–1998)		Cabinet Minister (Minister of Railways)	Nehru I Nehru II; Nehru III; Nehru IV; Nanda I Shastri; Nanda II; Indira I Indira II	INC (1951–1966); INC (R) (1970–1971)	Acting Prime Minister	11 January 1966	24 January 1966	13 days	16 years, 2 months and 17 days
16	Gulzarilal Nanda (1898–1998)		Cabinet Minister (Minister of Railways)	Nehru I Nehru II; Nehru III; Nehru IV; Nanda I Shastri; Nanda II; Indira I Indira II	INC (1951–1966); INC (R) (1970–1971)	Cabinet Minister	24 January 1966	9 November 1966	9 months and 16 days	16 years, 2 months and 17 days
16	Gulzarilal Nanda (1898–1998)		Cabinet Minister (Minister of Railways)	Nehru I Nehru II; Nehru III; Nehru IV; Nanda I Shastri; Nanda II; Indira I Indira II	INC (1951–1966); INC (R) (1970–1971)	Cabinet Minister	18 February 1970	18 March 1971	1 year and 1 month	16 years, 2 months and 17 days
17	Shripad Naik (b. 1952)		Minister of State (Power and New Renewable Energy)	Vajpayee III; Modi I Modi II; Modi III	BJP (2000–2004, 2014–present)	Minister of State	30 September 2000	14 May 2002	1 year, 7 months and 14 days	15 years, 11 months and 5 days
17	Shripad Naik (b. 1952)		Minister of State (Power and New Renewable Energy)	Vajpayee III; Modi I Modi II; Modi III	BJP (2000–2004, 2014–present)	Minister of State	1 July 2002	22 May 2004	1 year, 10 months and 21 days	15 years, 11 months and 5 days
17	Shripad Naik (b. 1952)		Minister of State (Power and New Renewable Energy)	Vajpayee III; Modi I Modi II; Modi III	BJP (2000–2004, 2014–present)	Minister of State	26 May 2014	present	12 years, 5 months and 1 day	15 years, 11 months and 5 days
18	Bali Ram Bhagat (1922–2011)		Cabinet Minister (Minister of External Affairs)	Nehru II; Nehru III; Nehru IV; Nanda I Shastri; Nanda II; Indira I Rajiv II	INC (1956–1969, 1985–1986); INC (R) (1969–1971)	Deputy Minister	4 January 1956	10 April 1962	6 years, 3 months and 6 days	15 years, 9 months and 26 days
18	Bali Ram Bhagat (1922–2011)		Cabinet Minister (Minister of External Affairs)	Nehru II; Nehru III; Nehru IV; Nanda I Shastri; Nanda II; Indira I Rajiv II	INC (1956–1969, 1985–1986); INC (R) (1969–1971)	Deputy Minister	16 April 1962	21 September 1963	1 year, 5 months and 5 days	15 years, 9 months and 26 days
18	Bali Ram Bhagat (1922–2011)		Cabinet Minister (Minister of External Affairs)	Nehru II; Nehru III; Nehru IV; Nanda I Shastri; Nanda II; Indira I Rajiv II	INC (1956–1969, 1985–1986); INC (R) (1969–1971)	Minister of State	21 September 1963	14 February 1969	5 years, 4 months and 24 days	15 years, 9 months and 26 days
18	Bali Ram Bhagat (1922–2011)		Cabinet Minister (Minister of External Affairs)	Nehru II; Nehru III; Nehru IV; Nanda I Shastri; Nanda II; Indira I Rajiv II	INC (1956–1969, 1985–1986); INC (R) (1969–1971)	Cabinet Minister	14 February 1969	18 March 1971	2 years, 1 month and 4 days	15 years, 9 months and 26 days
18	Bali Ram Bhagat (1922–2011)		Cabinet Minister (Minister of External Affairs)	Nehru II; Nehru III; Nehru IV; Nanda I Shastri; Nanda II; Indira I Rajiv II	INC (1956–1969, 1985–1986); INC (R) (1969–1971)	Cabinet Minister	25 September 1985	12 May 1986	7 months and 17 days	15 years, 9 months and 26 days
19	Prakash Chandra Sethi (1919–1996)		Cabinet Minister (Minister of Planning and Irrigation)	Nehru III; Nehru IV; Nanda I Shastri; Nanda II; Indira I Indira II; Indira III	INC (1962–1969, 1980–1984); INC (R) (1969–1972, 1975–1977)	Deputy Minister	8 June 1962	9 June 1964	2 years and 1 day	15 years, 7 months and 27 days
19	Prakash Chandra Sethi (1919–1996)		Cabinet Minister (Minister of Planning and Irrigation)	Nehru III; Nehru IV; Nanda I Shastri; Nanda II; Indira I Indira II; Indira III	INC (1962–1969, 1980–1984); INC (R) (1969–1972, 1975–1977)	Deputy Minister	15 June 1964	13 March 1967	2 years, 8 months and 26 days	15 years, 7 months and 27 days
19	Prakash Chandra Sethi (1919–1996)		Cabinet Minister (Minister of Planning and Irrigation)	Nehru III; Nehru IV; Nanda I Shastri; Nanda II; Indira I Indira II; Indira III	INC (1962–1969, 1980–1984); INC (R) (1969–1972, 1975–1977)	Minister of State	13 March 1967	2 May 1971	4 years, 1 month and 19 days	15 years, 7 months and 27 days
19	Prakash Chandra Sethi (1919–1996)		Cabinet Minister (Minister of Planning and Irrigation)	Nehru III; Nehru IV; Nanda I Shastri; Nanda II; Indira I Indira II; Indira III	INC (1962–1969, 1980–1984); INC (R) (1969–1972, 1975–1977)	Cabinet Minister	2 May 1971	29 January 1972	8 months and 27 days	15 years, 7 months and 27 days
19	Prakash Chandra Sethi (1919–1996)		Cabinet Minister (Minister of Planning and Irrigation)	Nehru III; Nehru IV; Nanda I Shastri; Nanda II; Indira I Indira II; Indira III	INC (1962–1969, 1980–1984); INC (R) (1969–1972, 1975–1977)	Cabinet Minister	25 December 1975	24 March 1977	1 year, 2 months and 27 days	15 years, 7 months and 27 days
19	Prakash Chandra Sethi (1919–1996)		Cabinet Minister (Minister of Planning and Irrigation)	Nehru III; Nehru IV; Nanda I Shastri; Nanda II; Indira I Indira II; Indira III	INC (1962–1969, 1980–1984); INC (R) (1969–1972, 1975–1977)	Cabinet Minister	14 January 1980	31 October 1984	4 years, 9 months and 17 days	15 years, 7 months and 27 days
20	K. C. Pant (1931–2012)		Cabinet Minister (Minister of Defence)	Indira I Indira II; Charan; Rajiv II	INC (1967–1969, 1984–1989); INC (R) (1969–1977); INC (U) (1979–1980)	Minister of State	13 March 1967	9 November 1973	6 years, 7 months and 27 days	15 years, 4 months and 29 days
20	K. C. Pant (1931–2012)		Cabinet Minister (Minister of Defence)	Indira I Indira II; Charan; Rajiv II	INC (1967–1969, 1984–1989); INC (R) (1969–1977); INC (U) (1979–1980)	Cabinet Minister	9 November 1973	24 March 1977	3 years, 4 months and 15 days	15 years, 4 months and 29 days
20	K. C. Pant (1931–2012)		Cabinet Minister (Minister of Defence)	Indira I Indira II; Charan; Rajiv II	INC (1967–1969, 1984–1989); INC (R) (1969–1977); INC (U) (1979–1980)	Cabinet Minister	30 July 1979	14 January 1980	5 months and 15 days	15 years, 4 months and 29 days
20	K. C. Pant (1931–2012)		Cabinet Minister (Minister of Defence)	Indira I Indira II; Charan; Rajiv II	INC (1967–1969, 1984–1989); INC (R) (1969–1977); INC (U) (1979–1980)	Cabinet Minister	31 December 1984	2 December 1989	4 years, 11 months and 2 days	15 years, 4 months and 29 days
21	Manmohan Singh (1932–2024)		Prime Minister	Rao; Manmohan I Manmohan II	INC (1991–1996, 2004–2014)	Cabinet Minister	21 June 1991	16 May 1996	4 years, 10 months and 25 days	14 years, 10 months and 29 days
21	Manmohan Singh (1932–2024)		Prime Minister	Rao; Manmohan I Manmohan II	INC (1991–1996, 2004–2014)	Prime Minister	22 May 2004	26 May 2014	10 years and 4 days	14 years, 10 months and 29 days
22	Kamal Nath (b. 1946)		Cabinet Minister (Minister of Urban Development and Parliamentary Affairs)	Rao; Manmohan I Manmohan II	INC (1991–1996, 2004–2014)	Minister of State	21 June 1991	16 May 1996	4 years, 10 months and 25 days	14 years, 10 months and 29 days
22	Kamal Nath (b. 1946)		Cabinet Minister (Minister of Urban Development and Parliamentary Affairs)	Rao; Manmohan I Manmohan II	INC (1991–1996, 2004–2014)	Cabinet Minister	22 May 2004	26 May 2014	10 years and 4 days	14 years, 10 months and 29 days
23	Hansraj Bhardwaj (1937–2020)		Cabinet Minister (Minister of Law and Justice)	Rajiv II; Rao; Manmohan I	INC (1984–1989, 1991–1996, 2004–2009)	Minister of State	31 December 1984	2 December 1989	4 years, 11 months and 2 days	14 years, 9 months and 27 days
23	Hansraj Bhardwaj (1937–2020)		Cabinet Minister (Minister of Law and Justice)	Rajiv II; Rao; Manmohan I	INC (1984–1989, 1991–1996, 2004–2009)	Minister of State	21 June 1991	16 May 1996	4 years, 10 months and 25 days	14 years, 9 months and 27 days
23	Hansraj Bhardwaj (1937–2020)		Cabinet Minister (Minister of Law and Justice)	Rajiv II; Rao; Manmohan I	INC (1984–1989, 1991–1996, 2004–2009)	Cabinet Minister	22 May 2004	22 May 2009	5 years	14 years, 9 months and 27 days
24	Yashwantrao Chavan (1913–1984)		Deputy Prime Minister (Deputy Prime Minister and Minister of Home Affairs)	Nehru IV; Nanda I Shastri; Nanda II; Indira I Indira II; Charan	INC (1962–1969); INC (R) (1969–1977); INC (U) (1979–1980)	Cabinet Minister	21 November 1962	24 March 1977	14 years, 4 months and 3 days	14 years, 9 months and 20 days
24	Yashwantrao Chavan (1913–1984)		Deputy Prime Minister (Deputy Prime Minister and Minister of Home Affairs)	Nehru IV; Nanda I Shastri; Nanda II; Indira I Indira II; Charan	INC (1962–1969); INC (R) (1969–1977); INC (U) (1979–1980)	Deputy Prime Minister	28 July 1979	14 January 1980	5 months and 17 days	14 years, 9 months and 20 days
25	P. V. Narasimha Rao (1921–2004)		Prime Minister	Indira III; Rajiv II; Rao	INC (1980–1989, 1991–1996)	Cabinet Minister	14 January 1980	2 December 1989	9 years, 10 months and 18 days	14 years, 9 months and 13 days
25	P. V. Narasimha Rao (1921–2004)		Prime Minister	Indira III; Rajiv II; Rao	INC (1980–1989, 1991–1996)	Prime Minister	21 June 1991	16 May 1996	4 years, 10 months and 25 days	14 years, 9 months and 13 days
26	Rajnath Singh (b. 1951)		Cabinet Minister (Minister of Defence)	Vajpayee III; Modi I Modi II; Modi III	BJP (1999–2000, 2003–2004, 2014–present)	Cabinet Minister	22 November 1999	25 November 2000	1 year and 3 days	14 years, 5 months and 1 day
26	Rajnath Singh (b. 1951)		Cabinet Minister (Minister of Defence)	Vajpayee III; Modi I Modi II; Modi III	BJP (1999–2000, 2003–2004, 2014–present)	Cabinet Minister	24 May 2003	22 May 2004	11 months and 28 days	14 years, 5 months and 1 day
26	Rajnath Singh (b. 1951)		Cabinet Minister (Minister of Defence)	Vajpayee III; Modi I Modi II; Modi III	BJP (1999–2000, 2003–2004, 2014–present)	Cabinet Minister	26 May 2014	present	12 years, 5 months and 1 day	14 years, 5 months and 1 day
27	Keshav Dev Malviya (1904–1981)		Cabinet Minister (Minister of Petroleum, Chemicals and Fertilizers)	Nehru II; Nehru III; Nehru IV; Indira II	INC (1952–1963); INC (R) (1974–1977)	Deputy Minister	12 August 1952	7 December 1954	2 years, 3 months and 25 days	14 years and 27 days
27	Keshav Dev Malviya (1904–1981)		Cabinet Minister (Minister of Petroleum, Chemicals and Fertilizers)	Nehru II; Nehru III; Nehru IV; Indira II	INC (1952–1963); INC (R) (1974–1977)	Minister of State (Note: With Cabinet rank from 7 December 1954 – 17 April 1957.)	7 December 1954	10 April 1962	7 years, 4 months and 3 days	14 years and 27 days
27	Keshav Dev Malviya (1904–1981)		Cabinet Minister (Minister of Petroleum, Chemicals and Fertilizers)	Nehru II; Nehru III; Nehru IV; Indira II	INC (1952–1963); INC (R) (1974–1977)	Cabinet Minister	10 April 1962	26 June 1963	1 year, 2 months and 16 days	14 years and 27 days
27	Keshav Dev Malviya (1904–1981)		Cabinet Minister (Minister of Petroleum, Chemicals and Fertilizers)	Nehru II; Nehru III; Nehru IV; Indira II	INC (1952–1963); INC (R) (1974–1977)	Cabinet Minister	11 January 1974	24 March 1977	3 years, 2 months and 13 days	14 years and 27 days
28	Ghulam Nabi Azad (b. 1949)		Cabinet Minister (Minister of Health, Family Welfare and Water Resources)	Rajiv II; Rao; Manmohan I Manmohan II	INC (1984–1987, 1991–1996, 2004–2005, 2009–2014)	Minister of State	31 December 1984	7 September 1987	2 years, 8 months and 7 days	14 years and 16 days
28	Ghulam Nabi Azad (b. 1949)		Cabinet Minister (Minister of Health, Family Welfare and Water Resources)	Rajiv II; Rao; Manmohan I Manmohan II	INC (1984–1987, 1991–1996, 2004–2005, 2009–2014)	Cabinet Minister	21 June 1991	16 May 1996	4 years, 10 months and 25 days	14 years and 16 days
28	Ghulam Nabi Azad (b. 1949)		Cabinet Minister (Minister of Health, Family Welfare and Water Resources)	Rajiv II; Rao; Manmohan I Manmohan II	INC (1984–1987, 1991–1996, 2004–2005, 2009–2014)	Cabinet Minister	22 May 2004	1 November 2005	1 year, 5 months and 10 days	14 years and 16 days
28	Ghulam Nabi Azad (b. 1949)		Cabinet Minister (Minister of Health, Family Welfare and Water Resources)	Rajiv II; Rao; Manmohan I Manmohan II	INC (1984–1987, 1991–1996, 2004–2005, 2009–2014)	Cabinet Minister	22 May 2009	26 May 2014	5 years and 4 days	14 years and 16 days
29	Ziaur Rahman Ansari (1925–1992)		Cabinet Minister (Minister of Environment and Forests)	Indira II; Indira III; Rajiv II	INC (1980–1989); INC (R) (1973–1977)	Deputy Minister	6 February 1973	24 March 1977	4 years, 1 month and 18 days	13 years, 10 months and 14 days
29	Ziaur Rahman Ansari (1925–1992)		Cabinet Minister (Minister of Environment and Forests)	Indira II; Indira III; Rajiv II	INC (1980–1989); INC (R) (1973–1977)	Minister of State	3 March 1980	31 October 1984	4 years, 7 months and 28 days	13 years, 10 months and 14 days
29	Ziaur Rahman Ansari (1925–1992)		Cabinet Minister (Minister of Environment and Forests)	Indira II; Indira III; Rajiv II	INC (1980–1989); INC (R) (1973–1977)	Minister of State	4 November 1984	25 June 1988	3 years, 7 months and 21 days	13 years, 10 months and 14 days
29	Ziaur Rahman Ansari (1925–1992)		Cabinet Minister (Minister of Environment and Forests)	Indira II; Indira III; Rajiv II	INC (1980–1989); INC (R) (1973–1977)	Cabinet Minister	25 June 1988	2 December 1989	1 year, 5 months and 7 days	13 years, 10 months and 14 days
30	Shivraj Patil (1935–2025)		Cabinet Minister (Minister of Home Affairs)	Indira III; Rajiv II; Manmohan I	INC (1980–1989, 2004–2008)	Minister of State (Note: With Independent charge from 15 January 1982 – 29 January 1983, and from 25 June 1988 – 2 December 1989.)	19 October 1980	31 October 1984	4 years and 12 days	13 years, 7 months and 18 days
30	Shivraj Patil (1935–2025)		Cabinet Minister (Minister of Home Affairs)	Indira III; Rajiv II; Manmohan I	INC (1980–1989, 2004–2008)	Minister of State	4 November 1984	2 December 1989	5 years and 28 days	13 years, 7 months and 18 days
30	Shivraj Patil (1935–2025)		Cabinet Minister (Minister of Home Affairs)	Indira III; Rajiv II; Manmohan I	INC (1980–1989, 2004–2008)	Cabinet Minister	22 May 2004	30 November 2008	4 years, 6 months and 8 days	13 years, 7 months and 18 days
31	Ram Niwas Mirdha (1924–2010)		Cabinet Minister (Minister of Textiles, Health and Family Welfare)	Indira I Indira II; Indira III; Rajiv II	INC (1983–1989); INC (R) (1970–1977)	Minister of State (Note: With Independent charge from 29 January 1983 – 31 October 1984, and from 4 November 1984 – 15 February 1988.)	26 June 1970	24 March 1977	6 years, 8 months and 26 days	13 years, 6 months and 26 days
31	Ram Niwas Mirdha (1924–2010)		Cabinet Minister (Minister of Textiles, Health and Family Welfare)	Indira I Indira II; Indira III; Rajiv II	INC (1983–1989); INC (R) (1970–1977)	Minister of State	29 January 1983	31 October 1984	1 year, 9 months and 2 days	13 years, 6 months and 26 days
31	Ram Niwas Mirdha (1924–2010)		Cabinet Minister (Minister of Textiles, Health and Family Welfare)	Indira I Indira II; Indira III; Rajiv II	INC (1983–1989); INC (R) (1970–1977)	Minister of State	4 November 1984	15 February 1988	3 years, 3 months and 11 days	13 years, 6 months and 26 days
31	Ram Niwas Mirdha (1924–2010)		Cabinet Minister (Minister of Textiles, Health and Family Welfare)	Indira I Indira II; Indira III; Rajiv II	INC (1983–1989); INC (R) (1970–1977)	Cabinet Minister	15 February 1988	2 December 1989	1 year, 9 months and 17 days	13 years, 6 months and 26 days
32	Selja Kumari (b. 1962)		Cabinet Minister (Minister of Housing, Urban Poverty Alleviation and Social Justice and Empowerment)	Rao; Manmohan I Manmohan II	INC (1992–1996, 2004–2014)	Deputy Minister	2 July 1992	15 September 1995	3 years, 2 months and 13 days	13 years, 6 months and 14 days
32	Selja Kumari (b. 1962)		Cabinet Minister (Minister of Housing, Urban Poverty Alleviation and Social Justice and Empowerment)	Rao; Manmohan I Manmohan II	INC (1992–1996, 2004–2014)	Minister of State (Note: With Independent charge from 23 May 2004.)	15 September 1995	16 May 1996	8 months and 1 day	13 years, 6 months and 14 days
32	Selja Kumari (b. 1962)		Cabinet Minister (Minister of Housing, Urban Poverty Alleviation and Social Justice and Empowerment)	Rao; Manmohan I Manmohan II	INC (1992–1996, 2004–2014)	Minister of State	22 May 2004	22 May 2009	5 years	13 years, 6 months and 14 days
32	Selja Kumari (b. 1962)		Cabinet Minister (Minister of Housing, Urban Poverty Alleviation and Social Justice and Empowerment)	Rao; Manmohan I Manmohan II	INC (1992–1996, 2004–2014)	Cabinet Minister	28 May 2009	28 January 2014	4 years and 8 months	13 years, 6 months and 14 days
33	Dinesh Singh (1925–1995)		Cabinet Minister (Minister without portfolio)	Nehru IV; Nanda I Shastri; Nanda II; Indira I Rajiv II; Rao	INC (1962–1964, 1964–1969, 1988–1989, 1993–1995); INC (R) (1969–1971)	Deputy Minister	8 May 1962	9 June 1964	2 years, 1 month and 1 day	13 years and 6 months
33	Dinesh Singh (1925–1995)		Cabinet Minister (Minister without portfolio)	Nehru IV; Nanda I Shastri; Nanda II; Indira I Rajiv II; Rao	INC (1962–1964, 1964–1969, 1988–1989, 1993–1995); INC (R) (1969–1971)	Deputy Minister	15 June 1964	24 January 1966	1 year, 7 months and 9 days	13 years and 6 months
33	Dinesh Singh (1925–1995)		Cabinet Minister (Minister without portfolio)	Nehru IV; Nanda I Shastri; Nanda II; Indira I Rajiv II; Rao	INC (1962–1964, 1964–1969, 1988–1989, 1993–1995); INC (R) (1969–1971)	Minister of State	24 January 1966	13 March 1967	1 year, 1 month and 17 days	13 years and 6 months
33	Dinesh Singh (1925–1995)		Cabinet Minister (Minister without portfolio)	Nehru IV; Nanda I Shastri; Nanda II; Indira I Rajiv II; Rao	INC (1962–1964, 1964–1969, 1988–1989, 1993–1995); INC (R) (1969–1971)	Cabinet Minister	13 March 1967	18 March 1971	4 years and 5 days	13 years and 6 months
33	Dinesh Singh (1925–1995)		Cabinet Minister (Minister without portfolio)	Nehru IV; Nanda I Shastri; Nanda II; Indira I Rajiv II; Rao	INC (1962–1964, 1964–1969, 1988–1989, 1993–1995); INC (R) (1969–1971)	Cabinet Minister	14 February 1988	2 December 1989	1 year, 9 months and 18 days	13 years and 6 months
33	Dinesh Singh (1925–1995)		Cabinet Minister (Minister without portfolio)	Nehru IV; Nanda I Shastri; Nanda II; Indira I Rajiv II; Rao	INC (1962–1964, 1964–1969, 1988–1989, 1993–1995); INC (R) (1969–1971)	Cabinet Minister	18 January 1993	30 November 1995^{†}	2 years, 10 months and 12 days	13 years and 6 months
34	B. V. Keskar (1903 – 1984)		Minister of State (Minister of Information and Broadcasting)	Nehru I Nehru II; Nehru III	INC (1948–1962)	Deputy Minister	7 December 1948	26 January 1950	1 year, 1 month and 19 days	13 years, 3 months and 29 days
34	B. V. Keskar (1903 – 1984)		Minister of State (Minister of Information and Broadcasting)	Nehru I Nehru II; Nehru III	INC (1948–1962)	Deputy Minister	31 January 1950	13 May 1952	2 years, 3 months and 13 days	13 years, 3 months and 29 days
34	B. V. Keskar (1903 – 1984)		Minister of State (Minister of Information and Broadcasting)	Nehru I Nehru II; Nehru III	INC (1948–1962)	Minister of State	13 May 1952	9 April 1962	9 years, 10 months and 27 days	13 years, 3 months and 29 days
35	Santosh Gangwar (b. 1948)		Minister of State (Labour and Employment)	Vajpayee II; Vajpayee III; Modi I Modi II	BJP (1998–2004, 2014–2021)	Minister of State	19 March 1998	22 May 2004	6 years, 2 months and 3 days	13 years, 3 months and 14 days
35	Santosh Gangwar (b. 1948)		Minister of State (Labour and Employment)	Vajpayee II; Vajpayee III; Modi I Modi II	BJP (1998–2004, 2014–2021)	Minister of State	26 May 2014	7 July 2021	7 years, 1 month and 11 days	13 years, 3 months and 14 days
36	Buta Singh (1934–2021)		Cabinet Minister (Minister of Communications)	Indira II; Indira III; Rajiv II; Rao; Gujral	INC (R) (1974–1977); INC (1980–1989, 1995–1996); Independent (1998)	Deputy Minister	10 October 1974	24 March 1977	2 years, 5 months and 14 days	13 years and 19 days
36	Buta Singh (1934–2021)		Cabinet Minister (Minister of Communications)	Indira II; Indira III; Rajiv II; Rao; Gujral	INC (R) (1974–1977); INC (1980–1989, 1995–1996); Independent (1998)	Minister of State (Note: With Independent charge from 15 January 1982.)	8 June 1980	29 January 1983	2 years, 7 months and 21 days	13 years and 19 days
36	Buta Singh (1934–2021)		Cabinet Minister (Minister of Communications)	Indira II; Indira III; Rajiv II; Rao; Gujral	INC (R) (1974–1977); INC (1980–1989, 1995–1996); Independent (1998)	Cabinet Minister	29 January 1983	2 December 1989	6 years, 10 months and 3 days	13 years and 19 days
36	Buta Singh (1934–2021)		Cabinet Minister (Minister of Communications)	Indira II; Indira III; Rajiv II; Rao; Gujral	INC (R) (1974–1977); INC (1980–1989, 1995–1996); Independent (1998)	Cabinet Minister	10 February 1995	20 February 1996	1 year and 10 days	13 years and 19 days
36	Buta Singh (1934–2021)		Cabinet Minister (Minister of Communications)	Indira II; Indira III; Rajiv II; Rao; Gujral	INC (R) (1974–1977); INC (1980–1989, 1995–1996); Independent (1998)	Cabinet Minister	19 March 1998	20 April 1998	1 month and 1 day	13 years and 19 days
37	Lal Bahadur Shastri (1904–1966)		Prime Minister	Nehru II; Nehru III; Nehru IV; Nanda I Shastri	INC (1952–1956, 1957–1963, 1964–1966)	Cabinet Minister	13 May 1952	7 December 1956	4 years, 6 months and 24 days	12 years, 10 months and 27 days
37	Lal Bahadur Shastri (1904–1966)		Prime Minister	Nehru II; Nehru III; Nehru IV; Nanda I Shastri	INC (1952–1956, 1957–1963, 1964–1966)	Cabinet Minister	17 April 1957	1 September 1963	6 years, 4 months and 15 days	12 years, 10 months and 27 days
37	Lal Bahadur Shastri (1904–1966)		Prime Minister	Nehru II; Nehru III; Nehru IV; Nanda I Shastri	INC (1952–1956, 1957–1963, 1964–1966)	Cabinet Minister	24 January 1964	9 June 1964	4 months and 16 days	12 years, 10 months and 27 days
37	Lal Bahadur Shastri (1904–1966)		Prime Minister	Nehru II; Nehru III; Nehru IV; Nanda I Shastri	INC (1952–1956, 1957–1963, 1964–1966)	Prime Minister	9 June 1964	11 January 1966^{†}	1 year, 7 months and 2 days	12 years, 10 months and 27 days
38	Lalit Narayan Mishra (1923–1975)		Cabinet Minister (Minister of Railways)	Nehru III; Nehru IV; Nanda I Shastri; Nanda II; Indira I Indira II	INC (1960–1962, 1964–1969); INC (R) (1969–1975)	Deputy Minister	22 August 1960	10 April 1962	1 year, 7 months and 19 days	12 years, 5 months and 20 days
38	Lalit Narayan Mishra (1923–1975)		Cabinet Minister (Minister of Railways)	Nehru III; Nehru IV; Nanda I Shastri; Nanda II; Indira I Indira II	INC (1960–1962, 1964–1969); INC (R) (1969–1975)	Deputy Minister	26 February 1964	9 June 1964	3 months and 14 days	12 years, 5 months and 20 days
38	Lalit Narayan Mishra (1923–1975)		Cabinet Minister (Minister of Railways)	Nehru III; Nehru IV; Nanda I Shastri; Nanda II; Indira I Indira II	INC (1960–1962, 1964–1969); INC (R) (1969–1975)	Deputy Minister	15 June 1964	13 March 1967	2 years, 8 months and 26 days	12 years, 5 months and 20 days
38	Lalit Narayan Mishra (1923–1975)		Cabinet Minister (Minister of Railways)	Nehru III; Nehru IV; Nanda I Shastri; Nanda II; Indira I Indira II	INC (1960–1962, 1964–1969); INC (R) (1969–1975)	Minister of State	13 March 1967	27 June 1970	3 years, 3 months and 14 days	12 years, 5 months and 20 days
38	Lalit Narayan Mishra (1923–1975)		Cabinet Minister (Minister of Railways)	Nehru III; Nehru IV; Nanda I Shastri; Nanda II; Indira I Indira II	INC (1960–1962, 1964–1969); INC (R) (1969–1975)	Cabinet Minister	27 June 1970	3 January 1975^{†}	4 years, 6 months and 7 days	12 years, 5 months and 20 days
39	Narendra Modi (b. 1950)		Prime Minister	Modi I Modi II; Modi III	BJP (2014–present)	Prime Minister	26 May 2014	present		12 years, 5 months and 1 day
40	Nitin Gadkari (b. 1957)		Cabinet Minister (Minister of Road Transport and Highways)	Modi I Modi II; Modi III	BJP (2014–present)	Cabinet Minister	26 May 2014	present		12 years, 5 months and 1 day
41	Piyush Goyal (b. 1964)		Cabinet Minister (Minister of Commerce and Industry)	Modi I Modi II; Modi III	BJP (2014–present)	Minister of State (Note: With Independent charge.)	26 May 2014	3 September 2017	3 years, 3 months and 8 days	12 years and 5 months
41	Piyush Goyal (b. 1964)		Cabinet Minister (Minister of Commerce and Industry)	Modi I Modi II; Modi III	BJP (2014–present)	Cabinet Minister	3 September 2017	present	9 years, 1 month and 24 days	12 years and 5 months
42	Nirmala Sitharaman (b. 1959)		Cabinet Minister (Minister of Finance and Corporate Affairs)	Modi I Modi II; Modi III	BJP (2014–present)	Minister of State	26 May 2014	3 September 2017	3 years, 3 months and 8 days	12 years and 5 months
42	Nirmala Sitharaman (b. 1959)		Cabinet Minister (Minister of Finance and Corporate Affairs)	Modi I Modi II; Modi III	BJP (2014–present)	Cabinet Minister	3 September 2017	present	9 years, 1 month and 24 days	12 years and 5 months
43	Kiren Rijiju (b. 1971)		Cabinet Minister (Minister of Parliamentary and Minority Affairs)	Modi I Modi II; Modi III	BJP (2014–present)	Minister of State (Note: With Independent charge from 30 May 2019)	26 May 2014	7 July 2021	7 years, 1 month and 11 days	12 years and 5 months
43	Kiren Rijiju (b. 1971)		Cabinet Minister (Minister of Parliamentary and Minority Affairs)	Modi I Modi II; Modi III	BJP (2014–present)	Cabinet Minister	7 July 2021	present	5 years, 3 months and 20 days	12 years and 5 months
44	Jitendra Singh (b. 1956)		Minister of State (Prime Minister's Office, Personnel, Public Grievances, Pensions, Space and Atomic Energy)	Modi I Modi II; Modi III	BJP (2014–present)	Minister of State (Note: With Independent charge until 18 May 2023.)	26 May 2014	present		12 years, 5 months and 1 day
45	Krishan Pal Gurjar (b. 1957)		Minister of State (Cooperation)	Modi I Modi II; Modi III	BJP (2014–present)	Minister of State	26 May 2014	present		12 years, 5 months and 1 day
46	Mehr Chand Khanna (1897 – 1970)		Minister of State (Minister of Works, Housing and Urban Development)	Nehru II; Nehru III; Nehru IV; Nanda I Shastri; Nanda II	INC (1954–1967)	Minister of State (with Cabinet rank)	7 December 1954	13 March 1967		12 years, 3 months and 6 days
47	Dharmendra Pradhan (b. 1969)		Cabinet Minister (Minister of Education)	Modi I Modi II; Modi III	BJP (2014–2026)	Minister of State	26 May 2014	3 September 2017	3 years, 3 months and 8 days	12 years, 1 month and 29 days
47	Dharmendra Pradhan (b. 1969)		Cabinet Minister (Minister of Education)	Modi I Modi II; Modi III	BJP (2014–2026)	Cabinet Minister	3 September 2017	25 July 2026	8 years, 10 months and 22 days	12 years, 1 month and 29 days
48	P. A. Sangma (1947–2016)		Cabinet Minister (Minister of Information and Broadcasting)	Indira III; Rajiv II; Rao	INC (1980–1988, 1991–1996)	Deputy Minister	31 October 1980	31 October 1984	4 years	12 years, 1 month and 28 days
48	P. A. Sangma (1947–2016)		Cabinet Minister (Minister of Information and Broadcasting)	Indira III; Rajiv II; Rao	INC (1980–1988, 1991–1996)	Deputy Minister	4 November 1984	31 December 1984	1 month and 27 days	12 years, 1 month and 28 days
48	P. A. Sangma (1947–2016)		Cabinet Minister (Minister of Information and Broadcasting)	Indira III; Rajiv II; Rao	INC (1980–1988, 1991–1996)	Minister of State (Note: With Independent charge from 20 January 1986 – 6 February 1988, and from 21 June 1991 – 10 February 1995.)	1 January 1985	6 February 1988	3 years, 1 month and 5 days	12 years, 1 month and 28 days
48	P. A. Sangma (1947–2016)		Cabinet Minister (Minister of Information and Broadcasting)	Indira III; Rajiv II; Rao	INC (1980–1988, 1991–1996)	Minister of State	21 June 1991	10 February 1995	3 years, 7 months and 20 days	12 years, 1 month and 28 days
48	P. A. Sangma (1947–2016)		Cabinet Minister (Minister of Information and Broadcasting)	Indira III; Rajiv II; Rao	INC (1980–1988, 1991–1996)	Cabinet Minister	10 February 1995	16 May 1996	1 year, 3 months and 6 days	12 years, 1 month and 28 days
49	Jual Oram (b. 1961)		Cabinet Minister (Minister of Tribal AffAirs)	Vajpayee III; Modi I Modi III	BJP (1999–2004, 2014–2019, 2024–present)	Cabinet Minister	13 October 1999	22 May 2004	4 years, 7 months and 9 days	12 years
49	Jual Oram (b. 1961)		Cabinet Minister (Minister of Tribal AffAirs)	Vajpayee III; Modi I Modi III	BJP (1999–2004, 2014–2019, 2024–present)	Cabinet Minister	26 May 2014	30 May 2019	5 years and 4 days	12 years
49	Jual Oram (b. 1961)		Cabinet Minister (Minister of Tribal AffAirs)	Vajpayee III; Modi I Modi III	BJP (1999–2004, 2014–2019, 2024–present)	Cabinet Minister	9 June 2024	present	2 years, 4 months and 18 days	12 years
50	Bayya Suryanarayana Murthy (1906–1979)		Minister of State (Minister of Health, Family Planning, Works, Housing and Urban Development)	Nehru II; Nehru III; Nehru IV; Nanda I Shastri; Nanda II; Indira I	INC (1959–1969); INC (R) (1969–1971)	Deputy Minister	6 March 1959	10 April 1962	3 years, 1 month and 4 days	11 years, 11 months and 17 days
50	Bayya Suryanarayana Murthy (1906–1979)		Minister of State (Minister of Health, Family Planning, Works, Housing and Urban Development)	Nehru II; Nehru III; Nehru IV; Nanda I Shastri; Nanda II; Indira I	INC (1959–1969); INC (R) (1969–1971)	Deputy Minister	16 April 1962	16 February 1963	10 months	11 years, 11 months and 17 days
50	Bayya Suryanarayana Murthy (1906–1979)		Minister of State (Minister of Health, Family Planning, Works, Housing and Urban Development)	Nehru II; Nehru III; Nehru IV; Nanda I Shastri; Nanda II; Indira I	INC (1959–1969); INC (R) (1969–1971)	Deputy Minister	16 February 1963	9 June 1964	1 year, 3 months and 24 days	11 years, 11 months and 17 days
50	Bayya Suryanarayana Murthy (1906–1979)		Minister of State (Minister of Health, Family Planning, Works, Housing and Urban Development)	Nehru II; Nehru III; Nehru IV; Nanda I Shastri; Nanda II; Indira I	INC (1959–1969); INC (R) (1969–1971)	Deputy Minister	15 June 1964	13 March 1967	2 years, 8 months and 26 days	11 years, 11 months and 17 days
50	Bayya Suryanarayana Murthy (1906–1979)		Minister of State (Minister of Health, Family Planning, Works, Housing and Urban Development)	Nehru II; Nehru III; Nehru IV; Nanda I Shastri; Nanda II; Indira I	INC (1959–1969); INC (R) (1969–1971)	Deputy Minister	18 March 1967	18 February 1969	1 year and 11 months	11 years, 11 months and 17 days
50	Bayya Suryanarayana Murthy (1906–1979)		Minister of State (Minister of Health, Family Planning, Works, Housing and Urban Development)	Nehru II; Nehru III; Nehru IV; Nanda I Shastri; Nanda II; Indira I	INC (1959–1969); INC (R) (1969–1971)	Minister of State	18 February 1969	13 March 1971	2 years and 23 days	11 years, 11 months and 17 days
51	Giriraj Singh (b. 1952)		Cabinet Minister (Minister of Textiles)	Modi I Modi II; Modi III	BJP (2014–present)	Minister of State	9 Nov 2014	30 May 2019	4 years, 6 months and 21 days	11 years, 10 months and 17 days
51	Giriraj Singh (b. 1952)		Cabinet Minister (Minister of Textiles)	Modi I Modi II; Modi III	BJP (2014–present)	Cabinet Minister	30 May 2019	present	7 years, 4 months and 27 days	11 years, 10 months and 17 days
52	Inder Kumar Gujral (1919–2012)		Prime Minister	Indira I Indira II; Vishwanath; Deve Gowda; Gujral	INC (1967–1969); INC (R) (1969–1976); JD (1989–1990, 1996–1998)	Minister of State	18 March 1967	12 May 1976	9 years, 1 month and 24 days	11 years, 10 months and 14 days
52	Inder Kumar Gujral (1919–2012)		Prime Minister	Indira I Indira II; Vishwanath; Deve Gowda; Gujral	INC (1967–1969); INC (R) (1969–1976); JD (1989–1990, 1996–1998)	Cabinet Minister	6 December 1989	10 November 1990	11 months and 4 days	11 years, 10 months and 14 days
52	Inder Kumar Gujral (1919–2012)		Prime Minister	Indira I Indira II; Vishwanath; Deve Gowda; Gujral	INC (1967–1969); INC (R) (1969–1976); JD (1989–1990, 1996–1998)	Cabinet Minister	1 June 1996	21 April 1997	10 months and 20 days	11 years, 10 months and 14 days
52	Inder Kumar Gujral (1919–2012)		Prime Minister	Indira I Indira II; Vishwanath; Deve Gowda; Gujral	INC (1967–1969); INC (R) (1969–1976); JD (1989–1990, 1996–1998)	Prime Minister	21 April 1997	19 March 1998	10 months and 26 days	11 years, 10 months and 14 days
53	Shankarrao Chavan (1920–2004)		Cabinet Minister (Minister of Home Affairs)	Indira III; Rajiv II; Rao	INC (1980–1989, 1991–1996)	Cabinet Minister	19 October 1980	31 October 1984	4 years and 12 days	11 years, 8 months and 21 days
53	Shankarrao Chavan (1920–2004)		Cabinet Minister (Minister of Home Affairs)	Indira III; Rajiv II; Rao	INC (1980–1989, 1991–1996)	Cabinet Minister	4 November 1984	11 March 1986	1 year, 4 months and 7 days	11 years, 8 months and 21 days
53	Shankarrao Chavan (1920–2004)		Cabinet Minister (Minister of Home Affairs)	Indira III; Rajiv II; Rao	INC (1980–1989, 1991–1996)	Cabinet Minister	25 June 1988	2 December 1989	1 year, 5 months and 7 days	11 years, 8 months and 21 days
53	Shankarrao Chavan (1920–2004)		Cabinet Minister (Minister of Home Affairs)	Indira III; Rajiv II; Rao	INC (1980–1989, 1991–1996)	Cabinet Minister	21 June 1991	16 May 1996	4 years, 10 months and 25 days	11 years, 8 months and 21 days
54	Sharad Pawar (b. 1940)		Cabinet Minister (Minister of Agriculture and Food Processing Industries)	Rao; Manmohan I Manmohan II	INC (1991–1993, 2004–2014)	Cabinet Minister	26 June 1991	5 March 1993	1 year, 8 months and 7 days	11 years, 8 months and 11 days
54	Sharad Pawar (b. 1940)		Cabinet Minister (Minister of Agriculture and Food Processing Industries)	Rao; Manmohan I Manmohan II	INC (1991–1993, 2004–2014)	Cabinet Minister	22 May 2004	26 May 2014	10 years and 4 days	11 years, 8 months and 11 days
55	D. P. Karmarkar (1902–1991)		Minister of State (Minister of Health)	Nehru I Nehru II; Nehru III	INC (1950–1962)	Deputy Minister	14 August 1950	12 August 1952	1 year, 11 months and 29 days	11 years, 7 months and 27 days
55	D. P. Karmarkar (1902–1991)		Minister of State (Minister of Health)	Nehru I Nehru II; Nehru III	INC (1950–1962)	Minister of State (Note: With Cabinet rank from 12 August 1952 – 13 June 1956.)	12 August 1952	9 April 1962	9 years, 7 months and 28 days	11 years, 7 months and 27 days
56	Ashoke Kumar Sen (1913–1996)		Cabinet Minister (Minister of Steel and Mines)	Nehru III; Nehru IV; Nanda I Shastri; Nanda II; Rajiv II; Chandra Shekhar	INC (1957–1966, 1984–1987); SJP (R) (1990–1991)	Minister of State	17 April 1957	10 April 1962	4 years, 11 months and 24 days	11 years, 7 months and 8 days
56	Ashoke Kumar Sen (1913–1996)		Cabinet Minister (Minister of Steel and Mines)	Nehru III; Nehru IV; Nanda I Shastri; Nanda II; Rajiv II; Chandra Shekhar	INC (1957–1966, 1984–1987); SJP (R) (1990–1991)	Cabinet Minister	10 April 1962	24 January 1966	3 years, 9 months and 14 days	11 years, 7 months and 8 days
56	Ashoke Kumar Sen (1913–1996)		Cabinet Minister (Minister of Steel and Mines)	Nehru III; Nehru IV; Nanda I Shastri; Nanda II; Rajiv II; Chandra Shekhar	INC (1957–1966, 1984–1987); SJP (R) (1990–1991)	Cabinet Minister	31 December 1984	31 March 1987	2 years and 3 months	11 years, 7 months and 8 days
56	Ashoke Kumar Sen (1913–1996)		Cabinet Minister (Minister of Steel and Mines)	Nehru III; Nehru IV; Nanda I Shastri; Nanda II; Rajiv II; Chandra Shekhar	INC (1957–1966, 1984–1987); SJP (R) (1990–1991)	Cabinet Minister	21 November 1990	21 June 1991	7 months	11 years, 7 months and 8 days
57	Mohammad Shafi Qureshi (1928–2019)		Cabinet Minister (Minister of Tourism and Civil Aviation)	Indira I Indira II; Indira III; Charan	INC (1966–1969); INC (R) (1969–1977); JP (S) (1979–1980)	Deputy Minister	29 January 1966	13 March 1967	1 year, 1 month and 13 days	11 years, 7 months and 4 days
57	Mohammad Shafi Qureshi (1928–2019)		Cabinet Minister (Minister of Tourism and Civil Aviation)	Indira I Indira II; Indira III; Charan	INC (1966–1969); INC (R) (1969–1977); JP (S) (1979–1980)	Deputy Minister	18 March 1967	10 October 1974	7 years, 6 months and 22 days	11 years, 7 months and 4 days
57	Mohammad Shafi Qureshi (1928–2019)		Cabinet Minister (Minister of Tourism and Civil Aviation)	Indira I Indira II; Indira III; Charan	INC (1966–1969); INC (R) (1969–1977); JP (S) (1979–1980)	Minister of State	10 October 1974	24 March 1977	2 years, 5 months and 14 days	11 years, 7 months and 4 days
57	Mohammad Shafi Qureshi (1928–2019)		Cabinet Minister (Minister of Tourism and Civil Aviation)	Indira I Indira II; Indira III; Charan	INC (1966–1969); INC (R) (1969–1977); JP (S) (1979–1980)	Cabinet Minister	30 July 1979	14 January 1980	5 months and 15 days	11 years, 7 months and 4 days
58	Morarji Desai (1896–1995)		Prime Minister	Nehru III; Nehru IV; Indira I Desai	INC (1956–1963, 1967–1969); INC (R) (1969–1977); JP (1977–1979)	Cabinet Minister	14 November 1956	31 August 1963	6 years, 9 months and 17 days	11 years, 5 months and 27 days
58	Morarji Desai (1896–1995)		Prime Minister	Nehru III; Nehru IV; Indira I Desai	INC (1956–1963, 1967–1969); INC (R) (1969–1977); JP (1977–1979)	Deputy Prime Minister (Note: and Minister of Finance from 13 March 1967 – 16 July 1969.)	13 March 1967	19 July 1969	2 years, 4 months and 6 days	11 years, 5 months and 27 days
58	Morarji Desai (1896–1995)		Prime Minister	Nehru III; Nehru IV; Indira I Desai	INC (1956–1963, 1967–1969); INC (R) (1969–1977); JP (1977–1979)	Prime Minister	24 March 1977	28 July 1979	2 years, 4 months and 4 days	11 years, 5 months and 27 days
59	Jyotiraditya Scindia (b. 1971)		Cabinet Minister (Minister of Communications)	Manmohan I Manmohan II; Modi II; Modi III	INC (2008–2014); BJP (2021–present)	Minister of State	6 April 2008	22 May 2009	1 year, 1 month and 16 days	11 years, 5 months and 3 days
59	Jyotiraditya Scindia (b. 1971)		Cabinet Minister (Minister of Communications)	Manmohan I Manmohan II; Modi II; Modi III	INC (2008–2014); BJP (2021–present)	Minister of State	28 May 2009	26 May 2014	4 years, 11 months and 28 days	11 years, 5 months and 3 days
59	Jyotiraditya Scindia (b. 1971)		Cabinet Minister (Minister of Communications)	Manmohan I Manmohan II; Modi II; Modi III	INC (2008–2014); BJP (2021–present)	Cabinet Minister	7 July 2021	present	5 years, 3 months and 20 days	11 years, 5 months and 3 days
60	Chidambaram Subramaniam (1910–2000)		Cabinet Minister (Minister of Defence)	Nehru IV; Nanda I Shastri; Nanda II; Indira I Indira II; Charan	INC (1962–1969); INC (R) (1969–1977); INC (U) (1979–1980)	Cabinet Minister	10 April 1962	13 March 1967	4 years, 11 months and 3 days	11 years, 3 months and 18 days
60	Chidambaram Subramaniam (1910–2000)		Cabinet Minister (Minister of Defence)	Nehru IV; Nanda I Shastri; Nanda II; Indira I Indira II; Charan	INC (1962–1969); INC (R) (1969–1977); INC (U) (1979–1980)	Cabinet Minister	24 April 1971	24 March 1977	5 years and 11 months	11 years, 3 months and 18 days
60	Chidambaram Subramaniam (1910–2000)		Cabinet Minister (Minister of Defence)	Nehru IV; Nanda I Shastri; Nanda II; Indira I Indira II; Charan	INC (1962–1969); INC (R) (1969–1977); INC (U) (1979–1980)	Cabinet Minister	30 July 1979	14 January 1980	5 months and 15 days	11 years, 3 months and 18 days
61	K. Chengalaraya Reddy (1902–1976)		Cabinet Minister (Minister of Commerce and Industry)	Nehru II; Nehru III; Nehru IV	INC (1952–1963)	Cabinet Minister	15 May 1952	19 July 1963		11 years, 2 months and 4 days
62	C. K. Jaffer Sharief (1933–2018)		Cabinet Minister (Minister without Portfolio)	Indira III; Rajiv II; Rao	INC (1980–1984, 1988–1989, 1991–1995)	Minister of State (Note: With Independent charge 4 November–31 December 1984.)	14 January 1980	31 October 1984	4 years, 9 months and 17 days	11 years, 2 months and 3 days
62	C. K. Jaffer Sharief (1933–2018)		Cabinet Minister (Minister without Portfolio)	Indira III; Rajiv II; Rao	INC (1980–1984, 1988–1989, 1991–1995)	Minister of State	4 November 1984	31 December 1984	1 month and 27 days	11 years, 2 months and 3 days
62	C. K. Jaffer Sharief (1933–2018)		Cabinet Minister (Minister without Portfolio)	Indira III; Rajiv II; Rao	INC (1980–1984, 1988–1989, 1991–1995)	Minister of State	14 February 1988	2 December 1989	1 year, 9 months and 18 days	11 years, 2 months and 3 days
62	C. K. Jaffer Sharief (1933–2018)		Cabinet Minister (Minister without Portfolio)	Indira III; Rajiv II; Rao	INC (1980–1984, 1988–1989, 1991–1995)	Cabinet Minister	21 June 1991	22 November 1995	4 years, 5 months and 1 day	11 years, 2 months and 3 days
63	Annasaheb Shinde (1922–1993)		Minister of State (Minister of Agriculture and Irrigation)	Indira I Indira II; Indira III	INC (1966–1969); INC (R) (1969–1977)	Deputy Minister	24 January 1966	13 March 1967	1 year, 1 month and 17 days	11 years, 1 month and 28 days
63	Annasaheb Shinde (1922–1993)		Minister of State (Minister of Agriculture and Irrigation)	Indira I Indira II; Indira III	INC (1966–1969); INC (R) (1969–1977)	Minister of State	13 March 1967	24 March 1977	10 years and 11 days	11 years, 1 month and 28 days
64	Dajisaheb Chavan (1916–1973)		Minister of State (Minister of Law, Justice and Company Affairs)	Nehru IV; Nanda I Shastri; Nanda II; Indira I Indira II	INC (1962–1969); INC (R) (1969–1973)	Deputy Minister	8 May 1962	9 June 1964	2 years, 1 month and 1 day	11 years, 1 month and 18 days
64	Dajisaheb Chavan (1916–1973)		Minister of State (Minister of Law, Justice and Company Affairs)	Nehru IV; Nanda I Shastri; Nanda II; Indira I Indira II	INC (1962–1969); INC (R) (1969–1973)	Deputy Minister	15 June 1964	13 March 1967	2 years, 8 months and 26 days	11 years, 1 month and 18 days
64	Dajisaheb Chavan (1916–1973)		Minister of State (Minister of Law, Justice and Company Affairs)	Nehru IV; Nanda I Shastri; Nanda II; Indira I Indira II	INC (1962–1969); INC (R) (1969–1973)	Deputy Minister	18 March 1967	14 February 1969	1 year, 10 months and 27 days	11 years, 1 month and 18 days
64	Dajisaheb Chavan (1916–1973)		Minister of State (Minister of Law, Justice and Company Affairs)	Nehru IV; Nanda I Shastri; Nanda II; Indira I Indira II	INC (1962–1969); INC (R) (1969–1973)	Minister of State	14 February 1969	8 July 1973^{†}	4 years, 4 months and 24 days	11 years, 1 month and 18 days
65	Jaipal Reddy (1942–2019)		Cabinet Minister (Minister of Science and Technology)	Gujral; Manmohan I Manmohan II	JD (1997–1998); INC (2004–2014)	Cabinet Minister	1 May 1997	19 March 1998	10 months and 18 days	10 years, 10 months and 22 days
65	Jaipal Reddy (1942–2019)		Cabinet Minister (Minister of Science and Technology)	Gujral; Manmohan I Manmohan II	JD (1997–1998); INC (2004–2014)	Cabinet Minister	22 May 2004	26 May 2014	10 years and 4 days	10 years, 10 months and 22 days
66	T. R. Baalu (b. 1941)		Cabinet Minister (Minister of Shipping, Road Transport and Highways)	Deve Gowda; Gujral; Vajpayee III; Manmohan I	DMK (1996–1998, 1999–2003, 2004–2009)	Minister of State	6 July 1996	19 March 1998	1 year, 8 months and 13 days	10 years, 10 months and 21 days
66	T. R. Baalu (b. 1941)		Cabinet Minister (Minister of Shipping, Road Transport and Highways)	Deve Gowda; Gujral; Vajpayee III; Manmohan I	DMK (1996–1998, 1999–2003, 2004–2009)	Cabinet Minister	13 October 1999	21 December 2003	4 years, 2 months and 8 days	10 years, 10 months and 21 days
66	T. R. Baalu (b. 1941)		Cabinet Minister (Minister of Shipping, Road Transport and Highways)	Deve Gowda; Gujral; Vajpayee III; Manmohan I	DMK (1996–1998, 1999–2003, 2004–2009)	Cabinet Minister	22 May 2004	22 May 2009	5 years	10 years, 10 months and 21 days
67	Nityanand Kanungo (1900–1988)		Minister of State (Minister of Civil Aviation)	Nehru II; Nehru III; Nehru IV; Nanda I Shastri	INC (1954–1965)	Deputy Minister	28 September 1954	10 August 1955	10 months and 13 days	10 years, 10 months and 4 days
67	Nityanand Kanungo (1900–1988)		Minister of State (Minister of Civil Aviation)	Nehru II; Nehru III; Nehru IV; Nanda I Shastri	INC (1954–1965)	Minister of State (Note: With Cabinet rank 17–25 April 1957.)	10 August 1955	31 July 1965	9 years, 11 months and 21 days	10 years, 10 months and 4 days
68	Manubhai Shah (1915–2000)		Cabinet Minister (Minister of Commerce)	Nehru III; Nehru IV; Nanda I Shastri; Nanda II; Indira I	INC (1956–1967)	Minister of State (Note: With Cabinet rank 13 June 1956 – 16 April 1957, and from 25 April 1957 – 10 April 1962.)	1 May 1956	16 April 1957	11 months and 15 days	10 years, 10 months and 4 days
68	Manubhai Shah (1915–2000)		Cabinet Minister (Minister of Commerce)	Nehru III; Nehru IV; Nanda I Shastri; Nanda II; Indira I	INC (1956–1967)	Minister of State	17 April 1957	10 April 1962	4 years, 11 months and 24 days	10 years, 10 months and 4 days
68	Manubhai Shah (1915–2000)		Cabinet Minister (Minister of Commerce)	Nehru III; Nehru IV; Nanda I Shastri; Nanda II; Indira I	INC (1956–1967)	Minister of State	16 April 1962	24 January 1966	3 years, 9 months and 8 days	10 years, 10 months and 4 days
68	Manubhai Shah (1915–2000)		Cabinet Minister (Minister of Commerce)	Nehru III; Nehru IV; Nanda I Shastri; Nanda II; Indira I	INC (1956–1967)	Cabinet Minister	24 January 1966	13 March 1967	1 year, 1 month and 17 days	10 years, 10 months and 4 days
69	Maneka Gandhi (b. 1956)		Cabinet Minister (Minister of Women and Child Development)	Vishwanath; Chandra Shekhar; Vajpayee II; Vajpayee III; Modi I	JD (1989–1991); BJP (1998–2002, 2014–2019)	Minister of State (Note: With Independent charge from 21 November 1990 – 21 June 1991, and from 19 March 1998 – 1 July 2002.)	6 December 1989	21 June 1991	1 year, 6 months and 15 days	10 years, 10 months and 1 day
69	Maneka Gandhi (b. 1956)		Cabinet Minister (Minister of Women and Child Development)	Vishwanath; Chandra Shekhar; Vajpayee II; Vajpayee III; Modi I	JD (1989–1991); BJP (1998–2002, 2014–2019)	Minister of State	19 March 1998	1 July 2002	4 years, 3 months and 12 days	10 years, 10 months and 1 day
69	Maneka Gandhi (b. 1956)		Cabinet Minister (Minister of Women and Child Development)	Vishwanath; Chandra Shekhar; Vajpayee II; Vajpayee III; Modi I	JD (1989–1991); BJP (1998–2002, 2014–2019)	Cabinet Minister	26 May 2014	30 May 2019	5 years and 4 days	10 years, 10 months and 1 day
70	Faggan Singh Kulaste (b. 1959)		Minister of State (Minister of Steel and Rural Development (Note: With additional charge of Rural Development from 7 July 2021.))	Vajpayee III; Modi I Modi II	BJP (1999–2004, 2016–2017, 2019–2024)	Minister of State	13 October 1999	22 May 2004	4 years, 7 months and 9 days	10 years, 9 months and 18 days
70	Faggan Singh Kulaste (b. 1959)		Minister of State (Minister of Steel and Rural Development)	Vajpayee III; Modi I Modi II	BJP (1999–2004, 2016–2017, 2019–2024)	Minister of State	5 July 2016	3 September 2017	1 year, 1 month and 29 days	10 years, 9 months and 18 days
70	Faggan Singh Kulaste (b. 1959)		Minister of State (Minister of Steel and Rural Development)	Vajpayee III; Modi I Modi II	BJP (1999–2004, 2016–2017, 2019–2024)	Minister of State	30 May 2019	9 June 2024	5 years and 10 days	10 years, 9 months and 18 days
71	M. Arunachalam (1944–2004)		Cabinet Minister (Minister of Chemicals and Fertilizers)	Rajiv II; Rao; Deve Gowda; Gujral	INC (1985–1996); TMC (1996–1998)	Minister of State	25 September 1985	2 December 1989	4 years, 2 months and 7 days	10 years, 8 months and 28 days
71	M. Arunachalam (1944–2004)		Cabinet Minister (Minister of Chemicals and Fertilizers)	Rajiv II; Rao; Deve Gowda; Gujral	INC (1985–1996); TMC (1996–1998)	Minister of State	21 June 1991	3 April 1996	4 years, 9 months and 13 days	10 years, 8 months and 28 days
71	M. Arunachalam (1944–2004)		Cabinet Minister (Minister of Chemicals and Fertilizers)	Rajiv II; Rao; Deve Gowda; Gujral	INC (1985–1996); TMC (1996–1998)	Cabinet Minister	1 June 1996	21 April 1997	10 months and 20 days	10 years, 8 months and 28 days
71	M. Arunachalam (1944–2004)		Cabinet Minister (Minister of Chemicals and Fertilizers)	Rajiv II; Rao; Deve Gowda; Gujral	INC (1985–1996); TMC (1996–1998)	Cabinet Minister	1 May 1997	19 March 1998	10 months and 18 days	10 years, 8 months and 28 days
72	A. Raja (b. 1963)		Cabinet Minister (Minister of Communications and Information Technology)	Vajpayee III; Manmohan I Manmohan II	DMK (1999–2003, 2004–2010)	Minister of State	13 October 1999	21 December 2003	4 years, 2 months and 8 days	10 years, 7 months and 26 days
72	A. Raja (b. 1963)		Cabinet Minister (Minister of Communications and Information Technology)	Vajpayee III; Manmohan I Manmohan II	DMK (1999–2003, 2004–2010)	Cabinet Minister	22 May 2004	22 May 2009	5 years	10 years, 7 months and 26 days
72	A. Raja (b. 1963)		Cabinet Minister (Minister of Communications and Information Technology)	Vajpayee III; Manmohan I Manmohan II	DMK (1999–2003, 2004–2010)	Cabinet Minister	28 May 2009	15 November 2010	1 year, 5 months and 18 days	10 years, 7 months and 26 days
73	Maulana Azad (1888–1958)		Cabinet Minister (Minister of Education and Scientific Research)	Nehru I Nehru II; Nehru III	INC (1947–1958)	Cabinet Minister	15 August 1947	22 February 1958^{†}		10 years, 6 months and 7 days
74	B. N. Datar (1894–1963)		Minister of State (Home Affairs)	Nehru II; Nehru III; Nehru IV	INC (1952–1963)	Deputy Minister	12 August 1952	14 February 1956	3 years, 6 months and 2 days	10 years, 5 months and 27 days
74	B. N. Datar (1894–1963)		Minister of State (Home Affairs)	Nehru II; Nehru III; Nehru IV	INC (1952–1963)	Minister of State (Note: With Cabinet rank 14 February 1956 – 17 April 1957.)	14 February 1956	10 April 1962	6 years, 1 month and 27 days	10 years, 5 months and 27 days
74	B. N. Datar (1894–1963)		Minister of State (Home Affairs)	Nehru II; Nehru III; Nehru IV	INC (1952–1963)	Minister of State	16 April 1962	13 February 1963^{†}	9 months and 28 days	10 years, 5 months and 27 days
75	Karan Singh (b. 1931)		Cabinet Minister (Minister of Education and Culture)	Indira I Indira II; Charan Singh	INC (1967–1969); INC (R) (1969–1977); INC (U) (1979–1980)	Cabinet Minister	16 March 1967	24 March 1977	10 years and 8 days	10 years, 5 months and 23 days
75	Karan Singh (b. 1931)		Cabinet Minister (Minister of Education and Culture)	Indira I Indira II; Charan Singh	INC (1967–1969); INC (R) (1969–1977); INC (U) (1979–1980)	Cabinet Minister	30 July 1979	14 January 1980	5 months and 15 days	10 years, 5 months and 23 days
76	Dalbir Singh (1926–1987)		Minister of State (Energy-Coal)	Indira II; Indira III; Rajiv II	INC (R) (1971–1977); INC (1980–1984)	Deputy Minister	2 May 1971	24 March 1977	5 years, 10 months and 16 days	10 years, 5 months and 6 days
76	Dalbir Singh (1926–1987)		Minister of State (Energy-Coal)	Indira II; Indira III; Rajiv II	INC (R) (1971–1977); INC (1980–1984)	Minister of State	8 June 1980	31 October 1984	4 years, 4 months and 23 days	10 years, 5 months and 6 days
76	Dalbir Singh (1926–1987)		Minister of State (Energy-Coal)	Indira II; Indira III; Rajiv II	INC (R) (1971–1977); INC (1980–1984)	Minister of State	4 November 1984	31 December 1984	1 month and 27 days	10 years, 5 months and 6 days
77	S. K. Dey (1906–1989)		Minister of State (Minister of State for Mines and Metals)	Nehru II; Nehru III; Nehru IV; Nanda I Shastri; Nanda II; Indira I	INC (1956–1967)	Minister of State	20 September 1956	17 January 1967		10 years, 3 months and 28 days
78	Jagdish Tytler (b. 1944)		Minister of State (Overseas Indian Affairs)	Rajiv II; Rao; Manmohan I	INC (1985–1989, 1991–1996, 2004–2005)	Minister of State	25 September 1985	2 December 1989	4 years, 2 months and 7 days	10 years, 3 months and 21 days
78	Jagdish Tytler (b. 1944)		Minister of State (Overseas Indian Affairs)	Rajiv II; Rao; Manmohan I	INC (1985–1989, 1991–1996, 2004–2005)	Minister of State	21 June 1991	16 May 1996	4 years, 10 months and 25 days	10 years, 3 months and 21 days
78	Jagdish Tytler (b. 1944)		Minister of State (Overseas Indian Affairs)	Rajiv II; Rao; Manmohan I	INC (1985–1989, 1991–1996, 2004–2005)	Minister of State	22 May 2004	10 August 2005	1 year, 2 months and 19 days	10 years, 3 months and 21 days
79	Mansukh L. Mandaviya (b. 1972)		Cabinet Minister (Minister of Labour & Employment and Youth Affairs & Sports)	Modi I Modi II; Modi III	BJP (2016–present)	Minister of State	5 July 2016	7 July 2021	5 years and 2 days	10 years, 3 months and 21 days
79	Mansukh L. Mandaviya (b. 1972)		Cabinet Minister (Minister of Labour & Employment and Youth Affairs & Sports)	Modi I Modi II; Modi III	BJP (2016–present)	Cabinet Minister	7 July 2021	present	5 years, 3 months and 20 days	10 years, 3 months and 21 days
80	Ramdas Athawale (b. 1959)		Minister of State (Social Justice and Empowerment)	Modi I Modi II; Modi III	BJP (2016–present)	Minister of State	5 July 2016	present		10 years, 3 months and 22 days
81	Arjun Ram Meghwal (b. 1953)		Minister of State (Law and Jusice)	Modi I Modi II; Modi III	BJP (2016–present)	Minister of State	5 July 2016	present		10 years, 3 months and 22 days
82	Kanuri Lakshmana Rao (1902–1986)		Minister of State (Minister of State for Irrigation and Power)	Nehru IV; Nanda I Shastri; Indira I Indira II	INC (1963–1969); INC (R) (1969–1973)	Minister of State	19 July 1963	11 January 1966	2 years, 5 months and 23 days	10 years, 3 months and 9 days
82	Kanuri Lakshmana Rao (1902–1986)		Minister of State (Minister of State for Irrigation and Power)	Nehru IV; Nanda I Shastri; Indira I Indira II	INC (1963–1969); INC (R) (1969–1973)	Minister of State	24 January 1966	9 November 1973	7 years, 9 months and 16 days	10 years, 3 months and 9 days
83	Maragatham Chandrasekar (1917–2001)		Minister of State (Minister of State for Women and Social Welfare)	Nehru II; Nehru IV; Nanda I Shastri; Indira I Rajiv II	INC (1952–1957, 1962–1967, 1984–1985)	Deputy Minister	12 August 1952	16 April 1957	4 years, 8 months and 4 days	10 years, 2 months and 14 days
83	Maragatham Chandrasekar (1917–2001)		Minister of State (Minister of State for Women and Social Welfare)	Nehru II; Nehru IV; Nanda I Shastri; Indira I Rajiv II	INC (1952–1957, 1962–1967, 1984–1985)	Deputy Minister	8 May 1962	9 June 1964	2 years, 1 month and 1 day	10 years, 2 months and 14 days
83	Maragatham Chandrasekar (1917–2001)		Minister of State (Minister of State for Women and Social Welfare)	Nehru II; Nehru IV; Nanda I Shastri; Indira I Rajiv II	INC (1952–1957, 1962–1967, 1984–1985)	Deputy Minister	15 June 1964	11 January 1966	1 year, 6 months and 27 days	10 years, 2 months and 14 days
83	Maragatham Chandrasekar (1917–2001)		Minister of State (Minister of State for Women and Social Welfare)	Nehru II; Nehru IV; Nanda I Shastri; Indira I Rajiv II	INC (1952–1957, 1962–1967, 1984–1985)	Deputy Minister	24 January 1966	13 March 1967	1 year, 1 month and 17 days	10 years, 2 months and 14 days
83	Maragatham Chandrasekar (1917–2001)		Minister of State (Minister of State for Women and Social Welfare)	Nehru II; Nehru IV; Nanda I Shastri; Indira I Rajiv II	INC (1952–1957, 1962–1967, 1984–1985)	Minister of State	31 December 1984	25 September 1985	8 months and 25 days	10 years, 2 months and 14 days
84	Giridhar Gamang (b. 1943)		Minister of State (Minister of State for Mines)	Indira III; Rajiv II; Rao	INC (1982–1996)	Deputy Minister	15 January 1982	29 January 1983	1 year and 14 days	10 years, 1 month and 6 days
84	Giridhar Gamang (b. 1943)		Minister of State (Minister of State for Mines)	Indira III; Rajiv II; Rao	INC (1982–1996)	Deputy Minister	27 September 1985	15 February 1988	2 years, 4 months and 19 days	10 years, 1 month and 6 days
84	Giridhar Gamang (b. 1943)		Minister of State (Minister of State for Mines)	Indira III; Rajiv II; Rao	INC (1982–1996)	Minister of State	15 February 1988	2 December 1989	1 year, 9 months and 17 days	10 years, 1 month and 6 days
84	Giridhar Gamang (b. 1943)		Minister of State (Minister of State for Mines)	Indira III; Rajiv II; Rao	INC (1982–1996)	Minister of State	21 June 1991	5 September 1995	4 years, 2 months and 15 days	10 years, 1 month and 6 days
84	Giridhar Gamang (b. 1943)		Minister of State (Minister of State for Mines)	Indira III; Rajiv II; Rao	INC (1982–1996)	Minister of State	15 September 1995	16 May 1996	8 months and 1 day	10 years, 1 month and 6 days
85	Smriti Irani (b. 1976)		Cabinet Minister (Minister of Women and Child Development and Minority Affairs)	Modi I Modi II	BJP (2014–2024)	Cabinet Minister	26 May 2014	9 June 2024		10 years and 14 days
86	V. K. Singh (b. 1951)		Minister of State (Road Transport and Highways and Civil Aviation)	Modi I Modi II	BJP (2014–2024)	Minister of State	26 May 2014	9 June 2024		10 years and 14 days
87	M. V. Krishnappa (1918–1980)		Minister of State (Agriculture and Irrigation)	Nehru II; Nehru III; Charan Singh	INC (1952–1962); INC (U) (1979–1980)	Deputy Minister	12 August 1952	14 March 1962	9 years, 7 months and 2 days	10 years and 12 days
87	M. V. Krishnappa (1918–1980)		Minister of State (Agriculture and Irrigation)	Nehru II; Nehru III; Charan Singh	INC (1952–1962); INC (U) (1979–1980)	Minister of State	4 August 1979	14 January 1980	5 months and 10 days	10 years and 12 days
88	K. V. Raghunatha Reddy (1924–2002)		Minister of State (Labour)	Indira I Indira II	INC (1967–1969); INC (R) (1969–1977)	Minister of State	13 March 1967	24 March 1977		10 years and 11 days
89	Surendra Pal Singh (1917–2009)		Minister of State (Railways)	Indira I Indira II	INC (1967–1969); INC (R) (1969–1977)	Deputy Minister	18 March 1967	5 February 1973	5 years, 10 months and 18 days	10 years and 7 days
89	Surendra Pal Singh (1917–2009)		Minister of State (Railways)	Indira I Indira II	INC (1967–1969); INC (R) (1969–1977)	Minister of State	5 February 1973	24 March 1977	4 years, 1 month and 19 days	10 years and 7 days
90	Arjun Singh (1930–2011)		Cabinet Minister (Minister of Human Resource Development)	Rajiv II; Rao; Manmohan I	INC (1985–1988, 1991–1994, 2004–2009)	Cabinet Minister	15 November 1985	20 January 1986	2 months and 5 days	10 years and 1 day
90	Arjun Singh (1930–2011)		Cabinet Minister (Minister of Human Resource Development)	Rajiv II; Rao; Manmohan I	INC (1985–1988, 1991–1994, 2004–2009)	Cabinet Minister	22 October 1986	14 February 1988	1 year, 3 months and 23 days	10 years and 1 day
90	Arjun Singh (1930–2011)		Cabinet Minister (Minister of Human Resource Development)	Rajiv II; Rao; Manmohan I	INC (1985–1988, 1991–1994, 2004–2009)	Cabinet Minister	21 June 1991	24 December 1994	3 years, 6 months and 3 days	10 years and 1 day
90	Arjun Singh (1930–2011)		Cabinet Minister (Minister of Human Resource Development)	Rajiv II; Rao; Manmohan I	INC (1985–1988, 1991–1994, 2004–2009)	Cabinet Minister	22 May 2004	22 May 2009	5 years	10 years and 1 day

== See also ==
- List of longest-serving Indian chief ministers
- List of longest-serving members of the Parliament of India
