= Ministry of Heavy Industries =

Government ministry of India

- Branch of Government of India

- Ministry of Heavy Industries

Ministry overview
- Formed: 7 July 2021
- Jurisdiction: Government of India
- Annual budget: ₹6,171 crore (US$640 million) (2023-24 est)
- Ministry executives: H. D. Kumaraswamy, Minister of Heavy Industries; Bhupathi Raju Srinivasa Varma, Minister of State for Heavy Industries
- Website: heavyindustries.gov.in

The Ministry of Heavy Industries (Note: भारी उद्योग मन्त्रालय transl. Bhārī Udyōga Mantrālaya) is an executive agency of the Government of India. The Ministry entails for promoting the engineering industry viz. machine tools, heavy electrical, industrial machinery, and auto industry and administration of 40 operating Central Public Sector Enterprises (CPSEs) and 4 autonomous organizations.

As of June 2024, the Honourable Minister is H. D. Kumaraswamy and the Honourable Minister of State is Bhupathi Raju Srinivasa Varma.

== History ==
The Ministry of Heavy Industries was previously called Ministry of Heavy Industries and Public Enterprise. On 13 June 1956 the Ministry has been renamed as Ministry of Heavy Industries as the Department of Public Enterprises (DPE) was shifted to the Ministry of Finance.

== Structure ==
=== Divisions/Sections/Desks ===
- Finance & Administration
  - Finance
  - B&A (Budget & Accounts)
  - Cash
  - Administration
  - General Administration
  - Vigilance
  - Hindi
  - SC/ST Cell
  - RTI Cell (Right to Information)
  - O&M, Training (Organisation & Methods)
- Automotive Industry (AEI) Division
  - PLI Auto (Production Linked Incentive for Automobile and Auto Components)
  - SMEC Scheme (Specialized Manufacturing Ecosystem Control)
  - Social Media Cell
  - Coordination (OOMF, PDC/FDI)
  - FAME-II (Faster Adoption and Manufacturing of Electric Vehicles - Phase II)
  - Sub-sections: e-3W, EVPCS, e-2W, e-4W, e-Bus
  - PM E-Drive (e-3W, EVPCS, e-2W, e-Bus, e-Truck, e-Ambulance)
  - EMPS (Electric Mobility Promotion Scheme)
  - E-Mobility Policy matters
  - Ethanol Blending Programme (EBP)
  - Automotive Mission Plan
  - GVC Scheme (Global Value Chain)
- Heavy Electricals & Machine Tools (HE&MT)
  - HE&MT (Heavy Electricals & Machine Tools)
  - Skill Development
  - All technical work / matters of HE&MT
- Heavy Engineering Industries (HEI) & CPSEs
  - HEI (Heavy Engineering Industries)
  - BHEL (Bharat Heavy Electricals Limited)
  - RIC, NIL
  - R&C, BBJ, AYCL
  - SIL, TCIL, BPCL
  - HEC (Heavy Engineering Corporation)
  - NBCIL
  - REIL, B&R
  - HMT (Int), HMT Ltd, HMT (MT), HMT Watches, HMT Chinar watches, HMT Bearing
  - HSL, SSL
  - NEPA, HPC, HNL
  - BLC, TAFCO
  - HCL, TSPL
  - EPIL, NIDC, IL, FCRI
  - BOGL, MAMC, HPF
  - CCIL, TSL, BYNL
- Policy, Coordination & Special Cells
  - Corporate Cell
  - IC Cell (International Cooperation)
  - Project Development Cell (PDC)
  - IT Cell (Information Technology)
  - GST Facilitation Cell
  - Economic Wing
  - Technical Wing
  - PG Cell (Public Grievances)
  - Parliament / Parliament Questions of AEI
  - Media Publicity Cell
  - Central Monitoring of VIP references (e-Parinam Portal)
  - Coordination of Closure / Disinvestment of Units

=== Autonomous Bodies ===
There are four autonomous bodies under the ownership of Ministry of Heavy Industries.

- Fluid Control Research Institute (FCRI)
- Automotive Research Association of India (ARAI)
- National Automotive Board (NAB)
- Central Manufacturing Technology Institute (CMTI)

=== Central Public Sector Undertakings ===
There are 40 CPSUs under the ownership of Ministry of Heavy Industries, of which 16 are operational.

- Andrew Yule and Company (AYCL)
- Bharat Heavy Electricals Limited (BHEL)
- Braithwaite, Burn & Jessop Construction Ltd.
- Bridge & Roof Company (India) Ltd.
- Cement Corporation of India (CCI)
- Engineering Projects (India) Ltd.(EPI)
- Heavy Engineering Corporation Ltd. (HEC)
- HMT Ltd.(Holding Company with Tractor Division)
- HMT (Bearings ) Limited (a subsidiary of HMT)
- HMT Machine Tools (a subsidiary of HMT)
- Hindustan Salts Ltd. (HSL)
- Sambhar Salts Ltd. (SSL) (Subsidiary of HSL)
- Instrumentation Ltd. Kota (IL)
- Nepa Limited (NEPA)
- Rajasthan Electronics and Instruments Ltd.(subsidiary of ILK)
- Richardson & Cruddass (1972) Ltd.(R & C)

=== Industrial Sectors Regulation ===
The Industrial sectors regulated by the Ministry of Heavy Industries are:

- Heavy Engineering Equipment and Machine Tools Industry
- Heavy Electrical Engineering Industry
- Automotive Sector, including Tractors and Earth Moving Equipment

==== 20 Sub-sectors ====
20 Sub-sectors under the 3 broad sectors are as under:

- Boilers
- Cement Machinery
- Dairy Machinery
- Electrical Furnace
- Diesel Engines
- Material Handling Equipment
- Metallurgical Machinery including Steel Plant Equipment
- Earthmoving and Mining Machinery
- Machine Tool
- Oil Field Equipment
- Printing Machinery
- Pulp and Paper Machinery
- Rubber Machinery
- Switchgear and Control Gear
- Plastic Processing Machinery
- Sugar Machinery
- Turbines & Generator Set
- Transformers
- Textile Machinery
- Food Processing Machinery

== Cabinet Ministers ==
No.	Portrait	Minister (Birth-Death) Constituency	Term of office			Political party	Ministry	Prime Minister
No.	Portrait	Minister (Birth-Death) Constituency	From	To	Period	Political party	Ministry	Prime Minister
Minister of Heavy Industries
1		Manubhai Shah (1915–2000); MP for Jamnagar (MoS)	13 June 1956	30 August 1956	78 days	Indian National Congress	Nehru II	Jawaharlal Nehru
2		Govind Ballabh Pant (1887–1961); Rajya Sabha MP for Uttar Pradesh	30 August 1956	14 November 1956	76 days	Indian National Congress	Nehru II	Jawaharlal Nehru
3		Morarji Desai (1896–1995); Unelected	14 November 1956	16 April 1957	153 days	Indian National Congress	Nehru II	Jawaharlal Nehru
Minister of Steel and Heavy Industries
4		Chidambaram Subramaniam (1910–2000); MP for Pollachi	10 April 1962	21 November 1963	1 year, 225 days	Indian National Congress	Nehru IV	Jawaharlal Nehru
Minister of Steel, Mines and Heavy Industries
(4)		Chidambaram Subramaniam (1910–2000); MP for Pollachi	21 November 1963	9 June 1964	201 days	Indian National Congress	Nehru IV	Jawaharlal Nehru
(4)		Chidambaram Subramaniam (1910–2000); MP for Pollachi	21 November 1963	9 June 1964	201 days	Indian National Congress	Nanda I	Gulzarilal Nanda
Minister of Steel and Heavy Engineering
5		C. M. Poonacha (1910–1990); MP for Mangalore	14 February 1969	15 November 1969	274 days	Indian National Congress (R)	Indira II	Indira Gandhi
6		Swaran Singh (1907–1994); MP for Jullundur	15 November 1969	27 June 1970	224 days	Indian National Congress (R)	Indira II	Indira Gandhi
7		Bali Ram Bhagat (1922–2011); MP for Arrah	27 June 1970	15 March 1971	261 days	Indian National Congress (R)	Indira II	Indira Gandhi
8		Mohan Kumaramangalam (1916–1973); MP for Pondicherry	18 March 1971	2 May 1971	45 days	Indian National Congress (R)	Indira III	Indira Gandhi
Minister of Heavy Industry
9		T. A. Pai (1922–1981); Rajya Sabha MP for Karnataka	5 February 1973	10 October 1974	1 year, 247 days	Indian National Congress (R)	Indira III	Indira Gandhi
Ministry disestablished during this interval (Note: The ministry's competences were transferred to the Ministry of Industry.)
Minister of Heavy Industries and Public Enterprises
10		Manohar Joshi (1937–2024); MP for Mumbai North Central	13 October 1999	9 May 2002	2 years, 208 days	Shiv Sena	Vajpayee III	Atal Bihari Vajpayee
11		Suresh Prabhu (born 1953); MP for Rajapur	9 May 2002	1 July 2002	53 days	Shiv Sena	Vajpayee III	Atal Bihari Vajpayee
12		Balasaheb Vikhe Patil (1932–2016); MP for Kopargaon	1 July 2002	24 May 2003	327 days	Shiv Sena	Vajpayee III	Atal Bihari Vajpayee
13		Mohite Subodh Baburao (born 1961); MP for Ramtek	24 May 2003	22 May 2004	364 days	Shiv Sena	Vajpayee III	Atal Bihari Vajpayee
14		Santosh Mohan Dev (1934–2017); MP for Silchar (MoS, I/C until 29 January 2006)	23 May 2004	22 May 2009	4 years, 364 days	Indian National Congress	Manmohan I	Manmohan Singh
15		Vilasrao Deshmukh (1945–2012); Rajya Sabha MP for Maharashtra	28 May 2009	19 January 2011	1 year, 236 days	Indian National Congress	Manmohan II	Manmohan Singh
16		Praful Patel (born 1957); Rajya Sabha MP for Maharashtra	19 January 2011	26 May 2014	3 years, 127 days	Nationalist Congress Party	Manmohan II	Manmohan Singh
17		Anant Geete (born 1951); MP for Raigad	27 May 2014	30 May 2019	5 years, 3 days	Shiv Sena	Modi I	Narendra Modi
18		Arvind Sawant (born 1951); MP for Mumbai South	31 May 2019	11 November 2019	164 days	Shiv Sena	Modi II	Narendra Modi
19		Prakash Javadekar (born 1951); Rajya Sabha MP for Maharashtra	11 November 2019	7 July 2021	1 year, 238 days	Bharatiya Janata Party	Modi II	Narendra Modi
Minister of Heavy Industries
20		Mahendra Nath Pandey (born 1957); MP for Chandauli	7 July 2021	9 June 2024	2 years, 338 days	Bharatiya Janata Party	Modi II	Narendra Modi
21		H. D. Kumaraswamy (born 1957); MP for Mandya	10 June 2024	Incumbent	2 years, 116 days	Janata Dal (Secular)	Modi III	Narendra Modi

== Ministers of State ==
No.	Portrait	Minister (Birth-Death) Constituency	Term of office			Political party	Ministry	Prime Minister
No.	Portrait	Minister (Birth-Death) Constituency	From	To	Period	Political party	Ministry	Prime Minister
Minister of State for Heavy Industries
1		Manubhai Shah (1915–2000); MP for Jamnagar	30 August 1956	16 April 1957	229 days	Indian National Congress	Nehru II	Jawaharlal Nehru
Minister of State for Steel and Heavy Engineering
2		K. C. Pant (1931–2012); MP for Nainital	14 February 1969	27 June 1970	1 year, 108 days	Indian National Congress (R)	Indira II	Indira Gandhi
Minister of State for Heavy Industries and Public Enterprises
3		Vallabhbhai Kathiria (born 1954); MP for Rajkot	13 October 1999	29 January 2003	3 years, 108 days	Bharatiya Janata Party	Vajpayee III	Atal Bihari Vajpayee
4		Santosh Kumar Gangwar (born 1948); MP for Bareilly	8 September 2003	22 May 2004	257 days	Bharatiya Janata Party	Vajpayee III	Atal Bihari Vajpayee
5		Kanti Singh (born 1957); MP for Arrah (Heavy Industries)	29 January 2006	6 April 2008	2 years, 68 days	Rashtriya Janata Dal	Manmohan I	Manmohan Singh
6		Raghunath Jha (1939–2018); MP for Bettiah	6 April 2008	22 May 2009	1 year, 46 days	Rashtriya Janata Dal	Manmohan I	Manmohan Singh
7		Pratik Prakashbapu Patil (born 1973); MP for Sangli	28 May 2009	14 June 2009	17 days	Indian National Congress	Manmohan II	Manmohan Singh
8		Arun Subhashchandra Yadav (born 1974); MP for Khandwa	14 June 2009	19 January 2011	1 year, 219 days	Indian National Congress	Manmohan II	Manmohan Singh
9		Sai Prathap Annayyagari (born 1944); MP for Rajampet	19 January 2011	12 July 2011	174 days	Indian National Congress	Manmohan II	Manmohan Singh
10		Pon Radhakrishnan (born 1952); MP for Kanniyakumari	26 May 2014	9 November 2014	167 days	Bharatiya Janata Party	Modi I	Narendra Modi
11		G. M. Siddeshwara (born 1952); MP for Davanagere	9 November 2014	12 July 2016	1 year, 246 days	Bharatiya Janata Party	Modi I	Narendra Modi
12		Babul Supriyo (born 1970); MP for Asansol	12 July 2016	30 May 2019	2 years, 322 days	Bharatiya Janata Party	Modi I	Narendra Modi
13		Arjun Ram Meghwal (born 1953); MP for Bikaner	31 May 2019	7 July 2021	2 years, 37 days	Bharatiya Janata Party	Modi II	Narendra Modi
Minister of State for Heavy Industries
14		Krishan Pal Gurjar (born 1957); MP for Faridabad	7 July 2021	9 June 2024	2 years, 338 days	Bharatiya Janata Party	Modi II	Narendra Modi
15		Bhupathi Raju Srinivasa Varma (born 1967); MP for Narasapuram	10 June 2024	Incumbent	2 years, 116 days	Bharatiya Janata Party	Modi III	Narendra Modi

== Deputy Ministers ==
No.	Portrait	Minister (Birth-Death) Constituency	Term of office			Political party	Ministry	Prime Minister
No.	Portrait	Minister (Birth-Death) Constituency	From	To	Period	Political party	Ministry	Prime Minister
Deputy Minister of Steel and Heavy Industries
1		Prakash Chandra Sethi (1919–1996); MP for Indore	8 June 1962	21 November 1963	1 year, 166 days	Indian National Congress	Nehru IV	Jawaharlal Nehru
Deputy Minister of Steel, Mines and Heavy Engineering
(1)		Prakash Chandra Sethi (1919–1996); MP for Indore	21 November 1963	9 June 1964	201 days	Indian National Congress	Nehru IV	Jawaharlal Nehru
(1)		Prakash Chandra Sethi (1919–1996); MP for Indore	21 November 1963	9 June 1964	201 days	Indian National Congress	Nanda I	Gulzarilal Nanda
Deputy Minister of Steel and Heavy Engineering
2		Mohammad Shafi Qureshi (1928–2016); MP for Anantnag	14 February 1969	2 May 1971	2 years, 77 days	Indian National Congress (R)	Indira II	Indira Gandhi
2		Mohammad Shafi Qureshi (1928–2016); MP for Anantnag	14 February 1969	2 May 1971	2 years, 77 days	Indian National Congress (R)	Indira III	Indira Gandhi
Deputy Minister of Heavy Industry
3		Siddheshwar Prasad (1929–2023); MP for Nalanda	5 February 1973	9 November 1973	277 days	Indian National Congress (R)	Indira III	Indira Gandhi
4		Chaudhary Dalbir Singh (1926–1987); MP for Sirsa	9 November 1973	10 October 1974	335 days	Indian National Congress (R)	Indira III	Indira Gandhi
