= Second Nanda ministry =

Interim Union Council of Ministers

Second Gulzarilal Nanda ministry
- Interim Cabinet of the Republic of India

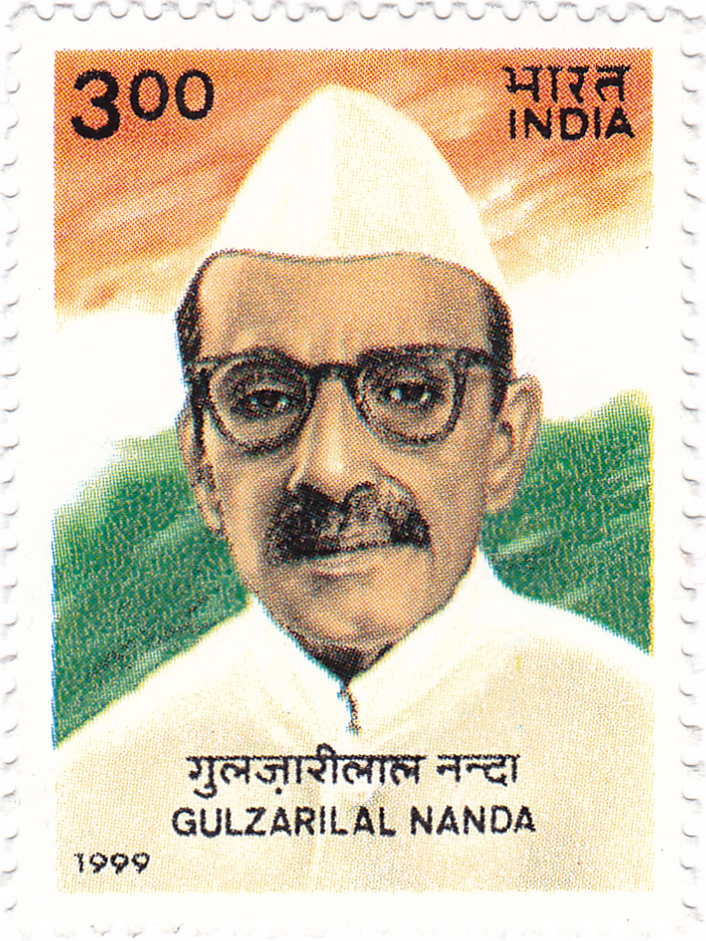
- Date formed: 11 January 1966
- Date dissolved: 24 January 1966

People and organisations
- Head of state: Sarvepalli Radhakrishnan
- Head of government: Gulzarilal Nanda
- Member party: Indian National Congress
- Status in legislature: Majority
- Opposition party: None
- Opposition leader: None

History
- Election: None
- Outgoing election: None
- Legislature term: 13 days
- Predecessor: Shastri ministry
- Successor: First Indira Gandhi ministry

The Second Gulzarilal Nanda ministry was formed as an interim cabinet upon the death in office of Lal Bahadur Shastri on 11 January 1966.

== Cabinet ==
Key

- ^{RES} Resigned

=== Cabinet ministers ===
Portfolio	Minister	Took office	Left office	Party	Ref
Prime Minister, Minister of Home Affairs, and Minister of Atomic Energy	Gulzarilal Nanda	11 January 1966	24 January 1966	INC	
Minister of External Affairs	Swaran Singh	11 January 1966	24 January 1966	INC	
Minister of Finance	Sachindra Chaudhuri	11 January 1966	24 January 1966	INC	
Minister of Defence	Yashwantrao Chavan	11 January 1966	24 January 1966	INC	
Minister of Petroleum and Chemicals	Humayun Kabir	11 January 1966	24 January 1966	INC	
Minister of Railways	S. K. Patil	11 January 1966	24 January 1966	INC	
Minister of Education	M. C. Chagla	11 January 1966	24 January 1966	INC	
Minister of Labour and Employment	Damodaram Sanjivayya	11 January 1966	24 January 1966	INC	
Minister of Communications and Parliamentary Affairs and Minister of Information and Broadcasting	Satya Narayan Sinha	11 January 1966	24 January 1966	INC	
Minister of Information and Broadcasting	Indira Gandhi	11 January 1966	24 January 1966	INC	
Minister of Steel and Mines	Neelam Sanjiva Reddy	11 January 1966	24 January 1966	INC	
Minister of Food and Agriculture	Chidambaram Subramaniam	11 January 1966	24 January 1966	INC	
Minister of Law and Social Security	Ashoke Kumar Sen	11 January 1966	24 January 1966	INC	
Minister of Rehabilitation	Mahavir Tyagi	11 January 1966	15 January 1966^{[RES]}	INC	

=== Ministers of State ===
Portfolio	Minister	Took office	Left office	Party	Ref
Minister of Works and Housing (additional charge as Minister of Rehabilitation from 15 January)	Mehr Chand Khanna	11 January 1966	24 January 1966	INC	
Minister of Commerce	Manubhai Shah	11 January 1966	24 January 1966	INC	
Minister of Transport	Raj Bahadur	11 January 1966	24 January 1966	INC	
Minister of Community Development and Cooperation	S. K. Dey	11 January 1966	24 January 1966	INC	
Minister of Health	Sushila Nayyar	11 January 1966	24 January 1966	INC	
Minister of State (Home Affairs) and Defence Supplies in the Ministry of Defence	Jaisukh lal Hathi	11 January 1966	24 January 1966	INC	
Minister of State (External Affairs)	Lakshmi N. Menon	11 January 1966	24 January 1966	INC	
Minister of State (Supply)	Kotha Raghuramaiah	11 January 1966	24 January 1966	INC	
Minister of State (Petroleum and Chemicals)	O. V. Alagesan	11 January 1966	24 January 1966	INC	
Minister of State (Railways)	Ram Subhag Singh	11 January 1966	24 January 1966	INC	
Minister of State (Law) and Minister of State (Social Security)	Ramchandra Martand Hajarnavis	11 January 1966	24 January 1966	INC	
Minister of State (Irrigation and Power)	K. L. Rao	11 January 1966	24 January 1966	INC	
Minister of Planning and Minister of State (Finance)	Bali Ram Bhagat	11 January 1966	24 January 1966	INC	
Minister of Defence Production	A.M. Thomas	11 January 1966	24 January 1966	INC	
Minister of State (Revenue and Expenditure)	C. M. Poonacha	11 January 1966	24 January 1966	INC	
Minister of Industry	T. N. Singh	11 January 1966	24 January 1966	INC	
