= Shastri ministry =

Former ministry of India

Lal Bahadur Shastri ministry
- 5th ministry of the Republic of India

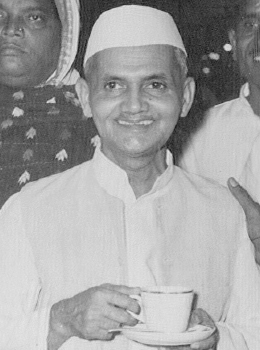
- Date formed: 9 June 1964
- Date dissolved: 11 January 1966

People and organisations
- Head of state: Sarvepalli Radhakrishnan
- Head of government: Lal Bahadur Shastri
- Member party: Indian National Congress
- Status in legislature: Majority
- Opposition party: None
- Opposition leader: None

History
- Election: None
- Outgoing election: None
- Legislature terms: 1 year, 7 months and 2 days
- Predecessor: (Note: First Nanda ministry (interim))Fourth Nehru ministry
- Successor: (Note: Second Nanda ministry (interim))First Indira Gandhi ministry

Lal Bahadur Shastri was sworn in as Prime Minister of India on 9 June 1964. In his ministry, the ministers were as follows.

== Cabinet ==
=== Cabinet Ministers ===
Key

- ^{†} Died in office
- ^{RES} Resigned

Cabinet members
Portfolio	Minister	Took office	Left office	Party	Ref
Prime Minister	Lal Bahadur Shastri	9 June 1964	11 January 1966^{[†]}	INC	
Minister of External Affairs	Lal Bahadur Shastri	9 June 1964	17 July 1964	INC	
Minister of External Affairs	Swaran Singh	18 July 1964	11 January 1966	INC	
Minister of Finance	T. T. Krishnamachari	9 June 1964	31 December 1965	INC	
Minister of Finance	Sachindra Chaudhuri	1 January 1966	11 January 1966	INC	
Minister of Home Affairs	Gulzarilal Nanda	9 June 1964	11 January 1966	INC	
Minister of Education	M. C. Chagla	9 June 1964	11 January 1966	INC	
Minister of Defence	Yashwantrao Chavan	9 June 1964	11 January 1966	INC	
Minister of Railways	S. K. Patil	9 June 1964	11 January 1966	INC	
Minister of Law and Justice and Communications	Ashoke Kumar Sen	9 June 1964	11 January 1966	INC	
Minister of Information and Broadcasting	Indira Gandhi	2 July 1964	11 January 1966	INC	
Minister of Industry	Ram Subhag Singh	9 June 1964	13 June 1964	INC	
Minister of Industry	Swaran Singh	9 June 1964	18 July 1964	INC	
Minister of Industry	H. C. Dasappa	19 July 1964	29 October 1964	INC	
Minister of Food and Agriculture	Chidambaram Subramaniam	9 June 1964	11 January 1966	INC	
Minister of Parliamentary Affairs and Civil Aviation	Satya Narayan Sinha	9 June 1964	11 January 1966	INC	
Minister of Irrigation and Power	H. C. Dasappa	9 June 1964	19 July 1964	INC	
Minister of Labour and Employment	Damodaram Sanjivayya	9 June 1964	11 January 1966	INC	
Minister of Steel and Mines	Neelam Sanjiva Reddy	9 June 1964	11 January 1966	INC	
Minister of Rehabilitation	Mahavir Tyagi	9 June 1964	11 January 1966	INC	
Minister of Petroleum and Chemicals	Humayun Kabir	9 June 1964	11 January 1966	INC	

=== Ministers of State ===
Cabinet members
Portfolio	Minister	Took office	Left office	Party
Minister of Works and Housing	Mehr Chand Khanna	9 June 1964	11 January 1966	INC
Minister of Commerce and Textiles and Jute	Manubhai Shah	9 June 1964	11 January 1966	INC
Minister of Cultural Affairs	Nityanand Kanungo	9 June 1964	11 January 1966	INC
Minister of Transport	Raj Bahadur	9 June 1964	11 January 1966	INC
Minister of Community Development and Cooperation	S. K. Dey	9 June 1964	11 January 1966	INC
Minister of Health	Sushila Nayyar	9 June 1964	11 January 1966	INC
Minister of State (Home Affairs)	Jaisukh lal Hathi	9 June 1964	11 January 1966	INC
Minister of State (External Affairs)	Lakshmi N. Menon	9 June 1964	11 January 1966	INC
Minister of State (Labour and Employment)	Kotha Raghuramaiah	9 June 1964	11 January 1966	INC
Minister of State (Petroleum and Chemicals)	O. V. Alagesan	9 June 1964	11 January 1966	INC
Minister of Social Security and Cottage Industries	Ram Subhag Singh	9 June 1964	11 January 1966	INC
Minister of Supply	Ramchandra Martand Hajarnavis	9 June 1964	11 January 1966	INC
Minister of State(Irrigation and Power)	K. L. Rao	9 June 1964	11 January 1966	INC
Minister of Planning	Bali Ram Bhagat	9 June 1964	11 January 1966	INC
Minister of State (Food and Agriculture)	A.M. Thomas	9 June 1964	11 January 1966	INC
Minister of State (Revenue and Expenditure)	C. M. Poonacha	2 January 1966	11 January 1966	INC
