= Fourth Nehru ministry =

Indian government headed by Jawaharlal Nehru from 1962 to 1964

Fourth Jawaharlal Nehru ministry
- 4th Cabinet of the Republic of India
- Date formed: 2 April 1962
- Date dissolved: 27 May 1964

People and organisations
- Head of state: Rajendra Prasad; Sarvepalli Radhakrishnan
- Head of government: Jawaharlal Nehru
- Member party: Indian National Congress
- Status in legislature: Majority
- Opposition party: None
- Opposition leader: None

History
- Election: 1962
- Outgoing election: None
- Legislature terms: 2 years, 1 month and 25 days
- Predecessor: Third Nehru ministry
- Successor: (Note: First Nanda ministry (interim)); Lal Bahadur Shastri ministry

The Fourth Jawaharlal Nehru ministry was formed on 2 April 1962 after the Indian National Congress won the 1962 general election.

== Cabinet ==
Key

- ^{†} Died in office
- ^{RES} Resigned

=== Cabinet ministers ===
Cabinet members
| Portfolio | Minister | Took office | Left office | Party | Ref |
|---|---|---|---|---|---|
| Prime Minister | Jawaharlal Nehru | Third Nehru ministry | 27 May 1964^{[†]} | INC | |
| Minister of Finance | Morarji Desai | Third Nehru ministry | 31 August 1963 | INC | |
| Minister of Finance | T. T. Krishnamachari | 31 August 1963 | 27 May 1964 | INC | |
| Minister of Home Affairs | Lal Bahadur Shastri | Third Nehru ministry | 1 September 1963 | INC | |
| Minister of Home Affairs | Gulzarilal Nanda | 1 September 1963 | 27 May 1964 | INC | |
| Minister of Defence | V. K. Krishna Menon | Third Nehru ministry | 31 October 1962 | INC | |
| Minister of Defence | Yashwantrao Chavan | 21 November 1962 | 27 May 1964 | INC | |
| Minister of Railways | Swaran Singh | 10 April 1962 | 21 September 1963 | INC | |
| Minister of Railways | H. C. Dasappa | 21 September 1963 | 27 May 1964 | INC | |
| Minister without Portfolio | Lal Bahadur Shastri | 24 January 1964 | 27 May 1964 | INC | |
| Minister of Transport and Communications | Jagjivan Ram | 10 April 1962 | 1 September 1963 (ministry abolished) | INC | |
| Minister of Education | K. L. Shrimali | 10 April 1962 | 31 August 1963 | INC | |
| Minister of Education | Humayun Kabir | 1 September 1963 | 21 November 1963 | INC | |
| Minister of Education | M. C. Chagla | 21 November 1963 | 27 May 1964 | INC | |
| Minister of Commerce and Industry | K. Chengalaraya Reddy | Third Nehru ministry | 19 July 1963 | INC | |
| Minister of Labour and Planning | Gulzarilal Nanda | Third Nehru ministry | 24 January 1964 | INC | |
| Minister of Labour and Planning | Damodaram Sanjivayya | 24 January 1964 | 27 May 1964 | INC | |
| Minister of Information and Broadcasting | B. V. Keskar | Third Nehru ministry | 27 May 1964 | INC | |
| Minister of Law (additional charge of Department of Posts and Telegraphs from 1 September 1963) | Ashoke Kumar Sen | 10 April 1962 | 27 May 1964 | INC | |
| Minister of Mines and Fuel | Keshav Dev Malaviya | 10 April 1962 | 27 May 1964 | INC | |
| Minister of Food and Agriculture | S. K. Patil | Third Nehru ministry | 1 September 1963 | INC | |
| Minister of Food and Agriculture | Swaran Singh | 1 September 1963 | 27 May 1964 | INC | |
| Minister of Scientific Research and Cultural Affairs | Humayun Kabir | 10 April 1962 | 21 November 1963 (ministry abolished) | INC | |
| Minister of Petroleum and Chemicals | Humayun Kabir | 21 November 1963 | 27 May 1964 | INC | |
| Minister of Irrigation and Power | Hafiz Mohammad Ibrahim | Third Nehru ministry | 27 May 1964 | INC | |
| Minister of Information and Broadcasting | Bezawada Gopala Reddy | 10 April 1962 | 31 August 1963 | INC | |
| Minister of Rehabilitation | Mahavir Tyagi | 16 April 1964 | 27 May 1964 | INC | |
| Minister of Steel and Heavy Industries (Minister of Steel, Mines and Heavy Engineering from 21 November 1963) | Chidambaram Subramaniam | 10 April 1962 | 27 May 1964 | INC | |
| Minister of Parliamentary Affairs (additional charge of Ministry of Information and Broadcasting from 1 September 1963) | Satya Narayan Sinha | 10 April 1962 | 27 May 1964 | INC | |
| Minister of Economic and Defence Coordination (Minister without Portfolio 8 June-14 November) | T. T. Krishnamachari | 14 November 1962 | 1 September 1963 (ministry abolished) | INC | |

=== Ministers of State ===
Cabinet members
| Portfolio | Minister | Took office | Left office | Party | Ref |
|---|---|---|---|---|---|
| Minister of Works and Housing (and Supply to 24 January 1964) | Mehr Chand Khanna | 10 April 1962 | 27 May 1964 | INC | |
| Minister of Industry | Nityanand Kanungo | 10 April 1962 | 27 May 1964 | INC | |
| Minister of Shipping (additional charge of the Ministry of Transport from 1 September 1963) | Raj Bahadur | 10 April 1962 | 27 May 1964 | INC | |
| Minister of Health | Sushila Nayyar | 10 April 1962 | 27 May 1964 | INC | |
| Minister of International Trade | Manubhai Shah | 16 April 1962 | 27 May 1964 | INC | |
| Minister of State (Home Affairs) | B. N. Datar | Second Nehru ministry | 22 February 1963 | INC | |
| Minister of State (Home Affairs) | Ramchandra Martand Hajarnavis | 22 February 1963 | 10 March 1964 | INC | |
| Minister of State (Home Affairs) | Jaisukh Lal Hathi | 10 March 1964 | 27 May 1964 | INC | |
| Minister of State (Defence) | Kotha Raghuramaiah | 16 April 1962 | 27 May 1964 | INC | |
| Minister of State (External Affairs) | Lakshmi N. Menon | 16 April 1962 | 27 May 1964 | INC | |
| Minister of State (Supply) | Jaisukh Lal Hathi | 24 January 1964 | 10 March 1964 | INC | |
| Minister of State (Supply) | Ramchandra Martand Hajarnavis | 10 March 1964 | 27 May 1964 | INC | |
| Minister of Labour | Jaisukh lal Hathi | 16 April 1962 | 24 January 1964 | INC | |
| Minister of Community Development (Minister of Community Development and Cooperation from December 1958; Minister of Community Development, Panchayati Raj and Cooperation from April 1962) | S. K. Dey | Second Nehru ministry | 27 May 1964 | INC | |
| Minister of State (Food and Agriculture) | Ram Subhag Singh | 16 April 1962 | 27 May 1964 | INC | |
| Minister of State (Mines and Fuel) | O. V. Alagesan | 19 July 1963 | 21 November 1963 | INC | |
| Minister of State (Petroleum and Chemicals) | O. V. Alagesan | 21 November 1963 | 27 May 1964 | INC | |
| Minister of State (Food and Agriculture) | A.M. Thomas | 21 November 1963 | 27 May 1964 | INC | |
| Minister of State (Irrigation and Power) | O. V. Alagesan | 8 May 1962 | 19 July 1963 | INC | |
| Minister of State (Irrigation and Power) | K. L. Rao | 19 July 1963 | 27 May 1964 | INC | |
| Minister of State (Planning) | Bali Ram Bhagat | 21 September 1963 | 27 May 1964 | INC | |
