= First Nanda ministry =

Interim Union Council of Ministers headed by Nanda

First Gulzarilal Nanda ministry
- Interim Cabinet of the Republic of India

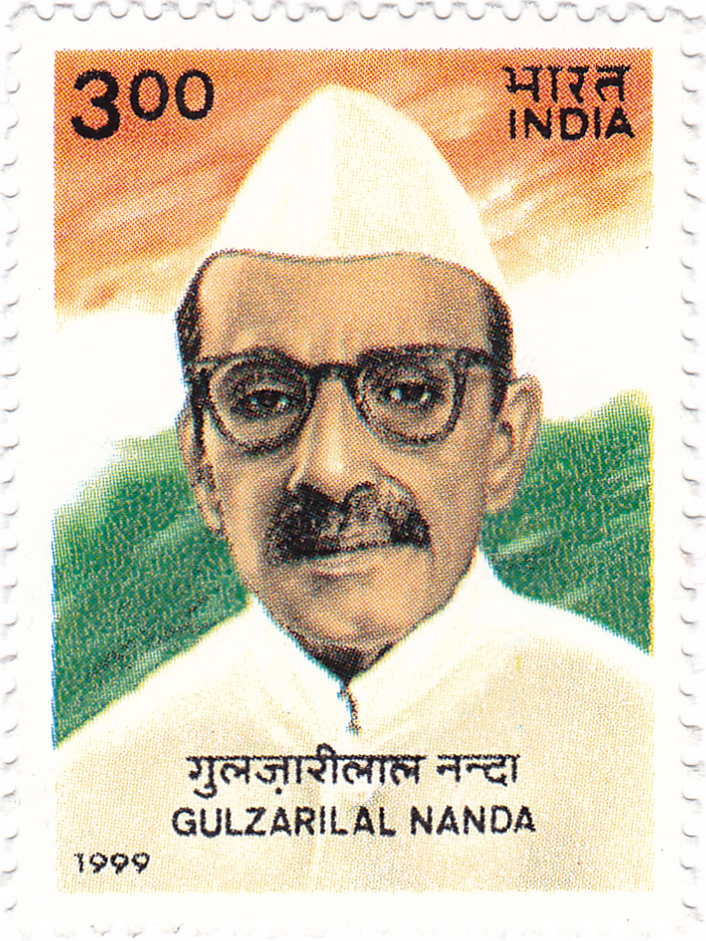
- Date formed: 27 May 1964
- Date dissolved: 9 June 1964

People and organisations
- Head of state: Sarvepalli Radhakrishnan
- Head of government: Gulzarilal Nanda
- Member party: Indian National Congress
- Status in legislature: Majority
- Opposition party: None
- Opposition leader: None

History
- Election: None
- Outgoing election: None
- Legislature term: 13 days
- Predecessor: Fourth Nehru ministry
- Successor: Shastri ministry

The First Gulzarilal Nanda ministry was formed as an interim cabinet upon the death in office of Jawaharlal Nehru on 27 May 1964.

== Cabinet ==
=== Cabinet ministers ===
Cabinet members
Portfolio	Minister	Took office	Left office	Party	Ref
Prime Minister, Minister of Home Affairs, Minister of External Affairs and Minister of Atomic Energy	Gulzarilal Nanda	27 May 1964	9 June 1964	INC	
Minister of Finance	T. T. Krishnamachari	27 May 1964	9 June 1964	INC	
Minister without Portfolio	Lal Bahadur Shastri	27 May 1964	9 June 1964	INC	
Minister of Defence	Yashwantrao Chavan	27 May 1964	9 June 1964	INC	
Minister of Petroleum and Chemicals	Humayun Kabir	27 May 1964	9 June 1964	INC	
Minister of Railways	H. C. Dasappa	27 May 1964	9 June 1964	INC	
Minister of Education	M. C. Chagla	27 May 1964	9 June 1964	INC	
Minister of Labour and Planning	Damodaram Sanjivayya	27 May 1964	9 June 1964	INC	
Minister of Parliamentary Affairs and Minister of Information and Broadcasting	Satya Narayan Sinha	27 May 1964	9 June 1964	INC	
Minister of Steel, Mines and Heavy Engineering	Chidambaram Subramaniam	27 May 1964	9 June 1964	INC	
Minister of Food and Agriculture	Swaran Singh	27 May 1964	9 June 1964	INC	
Minister of Law and Minister of Communications	Ashoke Kumar Sen	27 May 1964	9 June 1964	INC	
Minister of Rehabilitation	Mahavir Tyagi	27 May 1964	9 June 1964	INC	

=== Ministers of State ===
Cabinet members
Portfolio	Minister	Took office	Left office	Party	Ref
Minister of Works and Housing	Mehr Chand Khanna	27 May 1964	9 June 1964	INC	
Minister of International Trade	Manubhai Shah	27 May 1964	9 June 1964	INC	
Minister of Industry	Nityanand Kanungo	27 May 1964	9 June 1964	INC	
Minister of Transport	Raj Bahadur	27 May 1964	9 June 1964	INC	
Minister of Community Development and Cooperation	S. K. Dey	27 May 1964	9 June 1964	INC	
Minister of Health	Sushila Nayyar	27 May 1964	9 June 1964	INC	
Minister of State (Home Affairs)	Jaisukh lal Hathi	27 May 1964	9 June 1964	INC	
Minister of State (External Affairs)	Lakshmi N. Menon	27 May 1964	9 June 1964	INC	
Minister of Defence Production	Kotha Raghuramaiah	27 May 1964	9 June 1964	INC	
Minister of State (Petroleum and Chemicals)	O. V. Alagesan	27 May 1964	9 June 1964	INC	
Minister of State (Food and Agriculture)	Ram Subhag Singh	27 May 1964	9 June 1964	INC	
Minister of Supply	Ramchandra Martand Hajarnavis	27 May 1964	9 June 1964	INC	
Minister of Irrigation and Power	K. L. Rao	27 May 1964	9 June 1964	INC	
Minister of Planning	Bali Ram Bhagat	27 May 1964	9 June 1964	INC	
Minister of State (Food and Agriculture)	A.M. Thomas	27 May 1964	9 June 1964	INC	
