= A. M. Thomas =

Indian politician (1912–2004)

A.M. Thomas
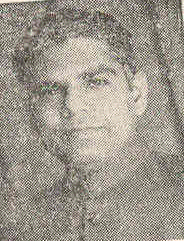

Union Minister of State for Defence, Government of India
- In office 24 January 1966 – 13 March 1967
- Prime Minister: Indira Gandhi
- Minister: Yashwantrao Chavan, Sardar Swaran Singh

Union Minister of State of Agriculture and Farmers Welfare, Government of India
- In office 21 November 1963 – 27 May 1964
- Prime Minister: Jawaharlal Nehru
- Minister: Swaran Singh
- In office 27 May 1964 – 9 June 1964
- Prime Minister: Gulzarilal Nanda (interim)
- Minister: Swaran Singh
- In office 9 June 1964 – 11 January 1966
- Prime Minister: Lal Bahadur Shastri
- Minister: Chidambaram Subramaniam

Member of Parliament for Ernakulam
- In office 1952–1967
- Preceded by: Position Established
- Succeeded by: V.V Menon

Personal details
- Born: 4 June 1912 Kurikad Village, Kingdom of Cochin
- Died: April 27, 2004 (aged 91) Kochi
- Party: Indian National Congress
- Spouse: Thankam
- Children: 4 sons and 5 daughters
- Parent: Mathai (father)
- Occupation: Politician; Lawyer

Alunkal Mathai Thomas (4 June 1912 – 27 April 2004) was an Indian politician from Kerala and an Indian National Congress leader. He served as Minister of State (Food and Agriculture) in Fourth Nehru ministry, First Nanda ministry and Lal Bahadur Shastri ministry.

== Early life ==
A. M. Thomas was born on June 4, 1912, in the village of Kurikad in Kingdom of Cochin. His father was Mathai of the Alunkal family. He was educated at St. Thomas College, Thrissur, Maharaja's College, Ernakulam and Law College, Trivandrum. He married Thankam in 1940 and they have four sons and five daughters. Mr. Thomas was a lawyer in Supreme Court. He served as Member of Cochin Legislative Council, Member of Standing Finance Committee. Member of Committee appointed by Cochin Government to enquire into disabilities of Pali tenants and Tenancy, Select Committees, Member of Travancore-Cochin Assembly between 1949 and 1952, Member of Executive Committee of Travancore-Cochin Assembly Congress Parliamentary Party and also Congress Whip from 1949 to 1951, and Speaker of Travancore-Cochin Legislative Assembly during 1951–52 at an age of 39.

== Parliamentary career ==
He was elected from Ernakulam to Lok Sabha for three consecutive terms from 1952 to 1962. He Served in a number of important committees constituted by the Parliament and was also the Chairman of the Select Committee on the Rubber Bill. He was Union Deputy Minister of Food and Agriculture from 1957 to 1963.He led Indian Delegation to the United Nations Sugar Conference held in Geneva in 1958 and 1961 and Delegation to Canada and the United States in 1960 as well.

== Death ==
Thomas died at his residence in Kochi on the morning of 27 April 2004. He was 91.

== See also ==
- Minister of Agriculture & Farmers Welfare
- List of members of the 1st Lok Sabha
- List of members of the 2nd Lok Sabha
- List of members of the 3rd Lok Sabha
- Fourth Nehru ministry
- First Nanda ministry
- Lal Bahadur Shastri ministry
- Ernakulam Lok Sabha constituency
