= Manubhai Shah =

Indian politician

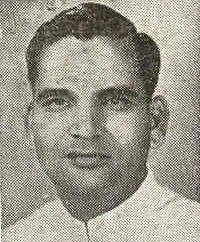
- Born: 1 November 1915; Surendranagar, Wadhwan State, Kathiawar Agency, British Raj (now Gujarat, India)
- Died: 28 December 2000 (aged 85); New Delhi, India
- Education: Institute of Chemical Technology, Mumbai
- Occupations: Former Cabinet Minister of Commerce, Industry, International Trade, Government of India
- Spouse: Vidyaben Shah

Manubhai Shah (1 November 1915 – 28 December 2000) was an Indian politician who played an important political and developmental role in independent India for over half a century. He was the inaugural minister of Ministry of Heavy Industries.

== Early career ==
He was a Member of Saurashtra Legislative Assembly from 1948 to 1956 and served as Minister of Finance, Planning and Industries, in the State Government, and was Union Cabinet Minister in the governments of Jawaharlal Nehru, Lal Bahadur Shastri and Indira Gandhi having held portfolios such as industries, commerce and foreign trade. An active social and political worker, Manubhai was an institution builder and initiated a wide range of educational, social, infrastructure, research and industrial institutions in India.

== National politics ==
Manubhai Shah was a Member of Second and Third Lok Sabha from 1957 to 1967 representing Madhya Saurashtra Parliamentary Constituency of erstwhile Bombay State and Jamnagar Parliamentary Constituency of Gujarat. He was also a Member of Rajya Sabha during 1956-57 and from 1970 to 1976. During his tenure, he held various portfolios as Union Minister including Industries, International Trade and Commerce.

Shah was instrumental in the setting up of nearly 400 industrial estates in the country. Gunnar Myrdal, who went on to win the 1974 Nobel Prize in Economics, quoted Shah as saying "The policy has always been pragmatic ... [as] the prime consideration has always been rapid growth rather than doctrinaire division of spheres. There is so much to be done that whoever can do it always gets encouragement". Myrdal alaos quoted Shah as saying "Long run growth of income will proceed fastest if instead of trying to do everything at the same time, we concentrate initially on basic and heavy industry".

Shah differed with his ministerial colleagues if he felt it necessary. On one occasion when he was Foreign Minister he had a disagreement with the Commerce Minister on Industrial Licensing Policy, but there was also respect for one another and the matter was resolved with Prime Minister Nehru. Another time, when Shah opposed the move on devaluation of the rupee, there were differences with the Finance Minister that caused Shah to temporarily resign his portfolio as Industry Minister.

The Maruti small car project was his brainchild. His most notable pioneering initiative was the setting up of the Small Industries Development Organisations and the Small Industries Service Institutes (SISI) which he was determined to create in every State and District of the country (which are now also known as Micro, Small and Medium Enterprises & Development Institutes (MSME-DI)). The first prototypes of these he had already set up as a Minister in the Saurashtra government, such as in Bhavnagar and Rajkot, where facilities were provided for starting up small units, procuring loans, providing technical and product advice, skills training, exhibiting and selling of produce through creation of emporiums, bringing together interested potential small entrepreneurs and organising seminars, and even setting up of industrial townships, such as the Bhavnagar Small Industries Association and the Rajkot Bhaktinagar Udyognagar which became forerunners to the SISIs and the Industrial Estates Shah helped set up across the country when he became Union Minister for Industries. As such these ideas of economic and industrial development were already conceived by Shah when he was in Ferozepur jail.

Among the institutions that Shah was instrumental in creating are the Gujarat Industrial Development Corporation, M P Shah Medical College Jamnagar, Akhil Bharat Gujarati Samaj, Triveni Kala Sangam, Sardar Patel Vidyalaya School.

== Expanding the trade sector ==
Manubhai’s contribution to the world of trade was significant and which also set a trend for further development of exports and widening of foreign trade in India. Immediately upon taking over office as Union Minister in New Delhi in 1956, he began setting up trade bodies to increase exports and make easy the bringing into the country imports of essential goods. During the tenure in office of Premier Khrushchev from 1956 to 1964, Manubhai worked closely with Khrushchev to effect a massive augmentation in trade between India and the Soviet Union. Manubhai's work with the Indian Institute of Foreign Trade throughout the decades until his death is legendary. He was President of the Indian Council of Foreign Trade in the 1970s. After he had left active politics, he continued to labour to expand trade with other countries. His most notable contribution to international trade is his setting up in 1986 of the INDIA CIS Chamber of Commerce and Industry (ICCCI) as Founder President. With his vast experience in the field of trade and his networking skills with leaders worldwide, the ICCCI flourished and businessmen from India and the independent States of the erstwhile USSR were brought together for augmenting trade between India and the CIS States.

== Later life ==
In retirement, Shah remained active until suffering a stroke on 16 December 2000, dying of a cardiac arrest two weeks later. At his death, he was the last living original cabinet minister of the first Indira Gandhi ministry.

== Books and publications ==
- Manubhai Shah, 1967, Commerce, Issues 1-11, Vora & Company Publishers Pvt Limited.
- Manubhai Shah, 1967, Management by Competence, Vora & Company Publishers Pvt Limited.
- Manubhai Shah, 1968, Developing countries and UNCTAD: (United Nations Conference on Trade and Development), 1st ed, Vora & Company Publishers Pvt Limited.
- Manubhai Shah, 1970, The new role of Reserve Bank in India's economic development, Vora & Company Publishers Pvt Limited.
