= Mehr Chand Khanna =

Indian politician

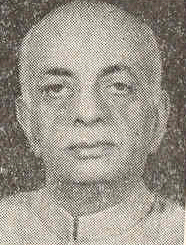
- Born: Mehr Chand Khanna; 1 June 1897; Peshawar, (British India, British India (now in Khyber Pakhtunkhwa, Pakistan)
- Died: 20 June 1970 (aged 73); Delhi, India
- Occupation: Politician

Mehr Chand Khanna (1 June 1897 – 20 July 1970) was an Indian politician who served as the Union Minister for Rehabilitation from 1954 to 1962. He served as the Law Minister from 1954 to 1957. He was the first Rehabilitation Minister of the Government of India, serving from 1948 to 1950. Before the partition of India, he served as the Minister of Finance in the North-West Frontier Province, a province of British India during the British Raj.

== Early life and education ==
Khanna was born in a Hindkowan Hindu family in Peshawar on 1 June 1897 to Karam Chand Khanna, a rich businessman.

He had his schooling in Peshawar and graduated from Edwardes College, Peshawar. Khanna also graduated in law and practised for a time as a lawyer.

== Politics ==
Mehr Chand Khanna entered politics at an early age and founded the Hindu Sabha. In 1926, he served as member of the Peshawar Cantonment Board, as a Hindu representative. He served for some time as a member of the Frontier Crimes Regulations Enquiry Committee set up by the Government of India.

In 1932, he was elected to the North West Frontier Province Assembly from the Peshawar Cantonment constituency as a member of the Hindu-Sikh Nationalist Party. When the Frontier National Congress captured power in the province in the 1937 elections and Khan Abdul Jabbar Khan became the Premier, Khanna, whose party was in winning alliance, was made the Minister of Finance. Khanna was the only Hindu minister in the cabinet. He was also the only cabinet minister who was not related to Khan Abdul Ghaffar Khan.

Khanna served as the Minister of Finance from 1937 to 1939, when Congress ministries all over India resigned in protest against Britain's declaration of war against Germany. He also served as Minister of Finance in the second Frontier Congress cabinet which ruled from 1945 to 1947.

Khanna participated in the Lok Sabha elections in independent India and was elected from the New Delhi Lok Sabha constituency. He served as Minister of Rehabilitation in the Jawaharlal Nehru cabinet from 1954 to 1962. Being a refugee himself, he is believed to have handled the refugee problem well. From 1954 to 1957, he also handled the law portfolio. During the 1960s, he was also giving the portfolio of housing.

== Arrest and migration ==
Khanna was serving as a cabinet minister in the NWFP government when the dominion of Pakistan was formed on 14 August 1947. However, the government was dismissed soon afterwards.

In January 1948 Khanna was arrested along with Khan Abdul Ghaffar Khan on charges of possessing firearms and lodged in Peshawar jail. The Indian government sent Anglo-Indian lawyer Frank Anthony to secure his release as no Hindu lawyer was willing to travel to Pakistan. Upon his release Khanna migrated to India and settled down in Delhi.

== Death ==
Mehr Chand Khanna died on 20 July 1970 in Delhi at the age of 73.

== Legacy ==
Khanna Market in Delhi was founded in 1954 and Meharchand Market was established in the early 1960s. These markets were named after their founder, Mehr Chand Khanna.

== Notes ==
- The Times of India directory and year book including who's who. Bennett, Coleman & Co. 1963. p. 1134.
