= Third Nehru ministry =

Indian government headed by Jawaharlal Nehru from 1957 to 1962

Third Jawaharlal Nehru ministry
- 3rd ministry of the Republic of India
- Date formed: 17 April 1957
- Date dissolved: 2 April 1962

People and organisations
- Head of state: Rajendra Prasad
- Head of government: Jawaharlal Nehru
- Member party: Indian National Congress
- Status in legislature: Majority
- Opposition party: None
- Opposition leader: None

History
- Election: 1957
- Outgoing election: 1962
- Legislature terms: 4 years, 11 months and 15 days
- Predecessor: Second Nehru ministry
- Successor: Fourth Nehru ministry

The Third Jawaharlal Nehru ministry was formed on 17 April 1957 after the Indian National Congress won the 1957 general election with a vast majority.

== Ministry ==
Key

- ^{†} Died in office
- ^{RES} Resigned

=== Cabinet ministers ===
Cabinet members
Portfolio	Minister	Took office	Left office	Party	Ref
Prime Minister; Minister of External Affairs; Minister of Finance (13 February-13 March 1958); Department of Atomic Energy	Jawaharlal Nehru	Second Nehru Ministry	Fourth Nehru ministry	INC	
Minister of Finance	T. T. Krishnamachari	17 April 1957	13 February 1958	INC	
Minister of Finance	Morarji Desai	13 March 1958	Fourth Nehru Ministry	INC	
Minister of Home Affairs	Govind Ballabh Pant	17 April 1957	7 March 1961^{[†]}	INC	
Minister of Home Affairs	Lal Bahadur Shastri	4 April 1961	Fourth Nehru Ministry	INC	
Minister of Defence	V. K. Krishna Menon	17 April 1957	Fourth Nehru Ministry	INC	
Minister of Railways	Jagjivan Ram	17 April 1957	Fourth Nehru Ministry	INC	
Minister of Education	Abul Kalam Azad	First Nehru Ministry	22 February 1958^{[†]}	INC	
Minister of Commerce and Industry	Morarji Desai	17 April 1957	13 March 1958	INC	
Minister of Commerce and Industry	Lal Bahadur Shastri	13 March 1958	4 April 1961	INC	
Minister of Commerce and Industry	K. Chengalaraya Reddy	4 April 1961	Fourth Nehru ministry	INC	
Minister of Labour and Planning	Gulzarilal Nanda	17 April 1957	Fourth Nehru Ministry	INC	
Minister of Transport and Communications	Lal Bahadur Shastri	17 April 1957	13 March 1958	INC	
Minister of Transport and Communications	S. K. Patil	13 March 1958	2 September 1959	INC	
Minister of Transport and Communications	P. Subbarayan	2 September 1959	Fourth Nehru ministry	INC	
Minister of Steel, Mines and Fuel	Swaran Singh	17 April 1957	Fourth Nehru Ministry	INC	
Minister of Works, Housing and Supply	K. Chengalaraya Reddy	17 April 1957	4 April 1961	INC	
Minister of Food and Agriculture	Ajit Prasad Jain	17 April 1957	August 1959^{[RES]}	INC	
Minister of Food and Agriculture	S. K. Patil	2 September 1959	Fourth Nehru ministry	INC	
Minister of Irrigation and Power	S. K. Patil	17 April 1957	13 March 1958	INC	
Minister of Irrigation and Power	Hafiz Mohammad Ibrahim	13 March 1958	Fourth Nehru ministry	INC	

=== Ministers of State ===
Cabinet members
Portfolio	Minister	Took office	Left office	Party	Ref
Minister of Parliamentary Affairs	Satya Narayan Sinha	First Nehru ministry	Fourth Nehru ministry	INC	
Minister of Information and Broadcasting	B. V. Keskar	Second Nehru Ministry	Fourth Nehru Ministry	INC	
Minister of Rehabilitation and Minority Affairs	Mehr Chand Khanna	Second Nehru ministry	Fourth Nehru ministry	INC	
Minister of Agriculture (Minister of Cooperation April 1957-December 1958)	Panjabrao Deshmukh	Second Nehru ministry	Fourth Nehru ministry	INC	
Minister of Mines and Oil	Keshav Dev Malaviya	17 April 1957	Fourth Nehru ministry	INC	
Minister of Health	D. P. Karmarkar	17 April 1957	Fourth Nehru ministry	INC	
Minister of Commerce	Nityanand Kanungo	17 April 1957	1957	INC	
Minister of State (Education and Scientific Research)	K. L. Shrimali	17 April 1957	Fourth Nehru ministry	INC	
Minister of Industry	Manubhai Shah	Second Nehru ministry	Fourth Nehru ministry	INC	
Minister of State (Home Affairs)	B. N. Datar	Second Nehru ministry	Fourth Nehru Ministry	INC	
Minister of Community Development (Minister of Community Development and Cooperation from December 1958)	S. K. Dey	Second Nehru ministry	Fourth Nehru Ministry	INC	
Minister of State (Transport and Communications)	Raj Bahadur	Second Nehru ministry	Fourth Nehru Ministry	INC	
Minister of State (Transport and Communications)	Humayun Kabir	17 April 1957	13 March 1958	INC	
Minister of Scientific Research and Culture	Humayun Kabir	13 March 1958	Fourth Nehru ministry	INC	
Minister of Law	Ashoke Kumar Sen	17 April 1957	Fourth Nehru Ministry	INC	
Minister of Economic Affairs (Minister of Revenue and Civil Expenditure from May 1958)	Bezawada Gopala Reddy	13 March 1958	4 April 1961	INC	
Minister of State (Works, Housing and Supply)	Bezawada Gopala Reddy	4 April 1961	Fourth Nehru ministry	INC	
