= Ministry of Commerce and Industry (India) =

Federal government ministry in India

- Branch of Government of India

- Ministry of Commerce & Industry

Agency overview
- Formed: 1947
- Jurisdiction: Government of India
- Headquarters: Vanijya Bhawan 16, Akbar Road, New Delhi
- Agency executives: Piyush Goyal, Cabinet Minister; Jitin Prasada, Minister of State
- Website: https://www.commerce.gov.in https://www.dpiit.gov.in/

The Ministry of Commerce and Industry (IAST: Vānijyā evām Udyog Mantrālaya) is a ministry of the Government of India responsible for foreign trade policy, foreign direct investment policy, and promoting internal trade. It negotiates trade agreements, represents India at the World Trade Organisation, and administers special economic zones, intellectual property offices and several commodity boards.

The ministry was re-created on 13 October 1999 under Prime Minister Atal Bihari Vajpayee by merging the Ministry of Commerce and the Ministry of Industry, both of which had existed in various forms since independence. The ministry has two departments: the Department of Commerce and the Department for Promotion of Industry and Internal Trade. It is usually headed by a minister of cabinet rank and occasionally by a minister of state (independent charge). The current minister is Piyush Goyal, in office since 31 May 2019.

== Organisation ==
=== Department of Commerce ===
The Department of Commerce is responsible for foreign trade policy, multilateral and bilateral commercial relations, state trading, export promotion, and the development and regulation of certain export-oriented industries and commodities. Its attached bodies include the Directorate General of Foreign Trade, which administers the foreign trade policy and import-export licensing, and the Directorate General of Trade Remedies, which conducts anti-dumping and countervailing duty investigations.

=== Department for Promotion of Industry and Internal Trade ===
The Department for Promotion of Industry and Internal Trade was established in 1995, and in 2000, the Department of Industrial Development was merged with it. The department is responsible for the formulation and implementation of promotional and developmental measures for growth of the industrial sector, keeping in view the national priorities and socio-economic objectives. While individual administrative ministries look after the production, distribution, development and planning aspects of specific industries allocated to them, Department for Promotion of Industry and Internal Trade is responsible for the overall Industrial Policy. It is also responsible for facilitating and increasing the FDI flows to the country. It is also responsible to calculate WPI (I.e. Wholesale Price Index).

The Department for Promotion of Industry and Internal Trade is also responsible for intellectual property rights relating to patents, designs, trademarks, copyrights and geographical indication of goods and oversees the initiative relating to their promotion and protection.

Recently instituted National Startup Award by the ministry recognised 46 startups on the eve of First National Startup Day announced by Hon'ble Prime Minister Narendra Modi. 'udChalo' and Ratan Tata backed 'Repos' and other remarkable startups are among the winners.

=== Autonomous Bodies ===
1. Agricultural and Processed Food Products Export Development Authority
2. Coffee Board of India
3. Export Inspection Council of India
4. Indian Institute of Packaging
5. Indian Institute of Plantation Management, Bangalore
6. National Institutes of Design
7. National Council for Cement and Building Materials
8. National Turmeric Board
9. National Productivity Council
10. Quality Council of India
11. Tea Board of India

=== Public sector undertakings and other bodies ===
1. India International Convention & Exhibition Centre (IICC) Limited
2. National Industrial Corridor Development Corporation
3. India Trade Promotion Organisation (ITPO)
4. The Plastics Export Promotion Council
5. Footwear Design and Development Institute

== Cabinet ministers ==
=== Minister of Commerce (1947–1999) ===
Portrait	Minister (Birth-Death) Constituency	Term of office			Political party	Ministry	Prime Minister
Portrait	Minister (Birth-Death) Constituency	From	To	Period	Political party	Ministry	Prime Minister
Minister of Commerce
	C. H. Bhabha (1910–1986)	26 October 1946	15 August 1947	293 days	Indian National Congress	Nehru I	Jawaharlal Nehru
	Kshitish Chandra Neogy (1888–1970); MLC for West Bengal	6 April 1948	19 April 1950	2 years, 13 days	Indian National Congress	Nehru I	Jawaharlal Nehru
	Jawaharlal Nehru (1889–1964); MP for United Provinces (Prime Minister)	19 April 1950	29 May 1950	40 days	Indian National Congress	Nehru I	Jawaharlal Nehru
	Sri Prakasa (1890–1971)	29 May 1950	26 December 1950	211 days	Indian National Congress	Nehru I	Jawaharlal Nehru
Minister of Commerce and Industry
	Harekrushna Mahatab (1899–1987); MP for Orissa (Interim)	26 December 1950	13 May 1952	1 year, 139 days	Indian National Congress	Nehru I	Jawaharlal Nehru
	T. T. Krishnamachari (1899–1974); MP for Madras South	13 May 1952	30 August 1956	4 years, 109 days	Indian National Congress	Nehru II	Jawaharlal Nehru
Minister of Commerce and Consumer Industries
	Swaran Singh (1907–1994); Rajya Sabha MP for Punjab	30 August 1956	14 November 1956	76 days	Indian National Congress	Nehru II	Jawaharlal Nehru
	Morarji Desai (1896–1995); Unelected	14 November 1956	1 January 1957	48 days	Indian National Congress	Nehru II	Jawaharlal Nehru
Minister of Commerce and Industry
	Morarji Desai (1896–1995); Unelected, until April 1957; MP for Surat, from April 1957	1 January 1957	28 March 1958	1 year, 86 days	Indian National Congress	Nehru II	Jawaharlal Nehru
	Morarji Desai (1896–1995); Unelected, until April 1957; MP for Surat, from April 1957	1 January 1957	28 March 1958	1 year, 86 days	Indian National Congress	Nehru III	Jawaharlal Nehru
	Lal Bahadur Shastri (1904–1966); MP for Allahabad	28 March 1958	5 April 1961	3 years, 8 days	Indian National Congress	Nehru III	Jawaharlal Nehru
	K. Chengalaraya Reddy (1902–1976); MP for Kolar	5 April 1961	19 July 1963	2 years, 105 days	Indian National Congress	Nehru III	Jawaharlal Nehru
	K. Chengalaraya Reddy (1902–1976); MP for Kolar	5 April 1961	19 July 1963	2 years, 105 days	Indian National Congress	Nehru IV	Jawaharlal Nehru
Minister of International Trade
	Manubhai Shah (1915–2000); MP for Jamnagar (Minister of State)	19 July 1963	9 June 1964	313 days	Indian National Congress	Nehru IV	Jawaharlal Nehru
	Manubhai Shah (1915–2000); MP for Jamnagar (Minister of State)	19 July 1963	9 June 1964	313 days	Indian National Congress	Nanda I	Gulzarilal Nanda
Minister of Commerce
	Manubhai Shah (1915–2000); MP for Jamnagar (Minister of State until 24 Jan 1966)	9 June 1964	13 March 1967	2 years, 277 days	Indian National Congress	Shastri	Lal Bahadur Shastri
	Manubhai Shah (1915–2000); MP for Jamnagar (Minister of State until 24 Jan 1966)	9 June 1964	13 March 1967	2 years, 277 days	Indian National Congress	Nanda II	Gulzarilal Nanda
	Manubhai Shah (1915–2000); MP for Jamnagar (Minister of State until 24 Jan 1966)	9 June 1964	13 March 1967	2 years, 277 days	Indian National Congress	Indira I	Indira Gandhi
	Dinesh Singh (1925–1995); MP for Pratapgarh	13 March 1967	14 February 1969	1 year, 338 days	Indian National Congress	Indira II	Indira Gandhi
Minister of Foreign Trade and Supply
	Bali Ram Bhagat (1922–2011); MP for Arrah	14 February 1969	4 November 1969	263 days	Indian National Congress (R)	Indira II	Indira Gandhi
Minister of Foreign Trade
	Bali Ram Bhagat (1922–2011); MP for Arrah	4 November 1969	27 June 1970	235 days	Indian National Congress (R)	Indira II	Indira Gandhi
	Lalit Narayan Mishra (1923–1975); Rajya Sabha MP for Bihar, until 1972; MP for Darbhanga, from 1972 (Minister of State)	27 June 1970	18 March 1971	2 years, 223 days	Indian National Congress (R)	Indira II	Indira Gandhi
	Lalit Narayan Mishra (1923–1975); Rajya Sabha MP for Bihar, until 1972; MP for Darbhanga, from 1972 (Minister of State)	18 March 1971	5 February 1973	2 years, 223 days	Indian National Congress (R)	Indira III	Indira Gandhi
Minister of Commerce
	D. P. Chattopadhyaya (1933–2022); Rajya Sabha MP for West Bengal (Minister of State until 23 Dec 1976)	5 February 1973	24 March 1977	4 years, 47 days	Indian National Congress (R)	Indira III	Indira Gandhi
	Mohan Dharia (1925–2013); MP for Pune	24 March 1977	28 July 1979	2 years, 126 days	Janata Party	Desai	Morarji Desai
	Hitendra Kanaiyalal Desai (1915–1993); MP for Godhra	30 July 1979	14 January 1980	349 days	Janata Party (Secular)	Charan	Charan Singh
	Pranab Mukherjee (1935–2020); Rajya Sabha MP for Gujarat	14 January 1980	15 January 1982	2 years, 1 day	Indian National Congress (I)	Indira IV	Indira Gandhi
	Shivraj Patil (born 1935); MP for Latur (Minister of State, I/C)	15 January 1982	29 January 1983	1 year, 14 days	Indian National Congress (I)	Indira IV	Indira Gandhi
	V. P. Singh (1931–2008); Rajya Sabha MP for Uttar Pradesh	29 January 1983	7 September 1984	1 year, 222 days	Indian National Congress (I)	Indira IV	Indira Gandhi
	Pranab Mukherjee (1935–2020); Rajya Sabha MP for Gujarat	7 September 1984	31 October 1984	54 days	Indian National Congress (I)	Indira IV	Indira Gandhi
Minister of Commerce and Supply
	Pranab Mukherjee (1935–2020); Rajya Sabha MP for Gujarat	31 October 1984	31 December 1984	61 days	Indian National Congress (I)	Rajiv I	Rajiv Gandhi
	Rajiv Gandhi (1944–1991); MP for Amethi (Prime Minister)	31 December 1984	14 January 1985	14 days	Indian National Congress (I)	Rajiv II	Rajiv Gandhi
	V. P. Singh (1931–2008); Rajya Sabha MP for Uttar Pradesh	14 January 1985	30 March 1985	75 days	Indian National Congress (I)	Rajiv II	Rajiv Gandhi
Minister of Commerce
	V. P. Singh (1931–2008); Rajya Sabha MP for Uttar Pradesh	30 March 1985	25 September 1985	179 days	Indian National Congress (I)	Rajiv II	Rajiv Gandhi
	Khurshed Alam Khan (1919–2013); MP for Farrukhabad (Minister of State, I/C)	25 September 1985	15 November 1985	51 days	Indian National Congress (I)	Rajiv II	Rajiv Gandhi
	Arjun Singh (1930–2011); MP for South Delhi	15 November 1985	20 January 1986	66 days	Indian National Congress (I)	Rajiv II	Rajiv Gandhi
	P. Shiv Shankar (1929–2017); Rajya Sabha MP for Gujarat	20 January 1986	25 July 1987	1 year, 186 days	Indian National Congress (I)	Rajiv II	Rajiv Gandhi
	N. D. Tiwari (1925–2018); Rajya Sabha MP for Uttar Pradesh	25 July 1987	25 June 1988	336 days	Indian National Congress (I)	Rajiv II	Rajiv Gandhi
	Dinesh Singh (1925–1995); MP for Pratapgarh	25 June 1988	2 December 1989	1 year, 160 days	Indian National Congress (I)	Rajiv II	Rajiv Gandhi
	V. P. Singh (1931–2008); MP for Fatehpur (Prime Minister)	2 December 1989	5 December 1989	3 days	Janata Dal	Vishwanath	V. P. Singh
	Arun Nehru (1944–2013); MP for Bilhaur	6 December 1989	10 November 1990	339 days	Janata Dal	Vishwanath	V. P. Singh
	Chandra Shekhar (1927–2007); MP for Ballia (Prime Minister)	10 November 1990	21 November 1990	11 days	Samajwadi Janata Party (Rashtriya)	Chandra Shekhar	Chandra Shekhar
	Subramanian Swamy (born 1939); Rajya Sabha MP for Uttar Pradesh	21 November 1990	21 June 1991	212 days	Janata Party	Chandra Shekhar	Chandra Shekhar
	P. Chidambaram (born 1945); MP for Sivaganga (Minister of State, I/C)	21 June 1991	9 July 1992	1 year, 18 days	Indian National Congress (I)	Rao	P. V. Narasimha Rao
	P. V. Narasimha Rao (1921–2004); MP for Nandyal (Prime Minister)	9 July 1992	17 January 1993	192 days	Indian National Congress (I)	Rao	P. V. Narasimha Rao
	Pranab Mukherjee (1935–2020); Rajya MP for West Bengal	18 January 1993	10 February 1995	2 years, 23 days	Indian National Congress (I)	Rao	P. V. Narasimha Rao
	P. Chidambaram (born 1945); MP for Sivaganga (Minister of State, I/C)	10 February 1995	3 April 1996	1 year, 53 days	Indian National Congress (I)	Rao	P. V. Narasimha Rao
	P. V. Narasimha Rao (1921–2004); MP for Nandyal (Prime Minister)	3 April 1996	16 May 1996	43 days	Indian National Congress (I)	Rao	P. V. Narasimha Rao
	Atal Bihari Vajpayee (1924–2018); MP for Lucknow (Prime Minister)	16 May 1996	1 June 1996	16 days	Bharatiya Janata Party	Vajpayee I	Atal Bihari Vajpayee
	Devendra Prasad Yadav (born 1953); MP for Jhanjharpur	1 June 1996	29 June 1996	28 days	Janata Dal	Deve Gowda	H. D. Deve Gowda
	Bolla Bulli Ramaiah (1926–2018); MP for Eluru (Minister of State, I/C)	29 June 1996	21 April 1997	296 days	Telugu Desam Party	Deve Gowda	H. D. Deve Gowda
	Bolla Bulli Ramaiah (1926–2018); MP for Eluru (Minister of State, I/C)	21 April 1997	19 March 1998	296 days	Telugu Desam Party	Gujral	I. K. Gujral
	Ramakrishna Hegde (1926–2004); Rajya Sabha MP for Karnataka	19 March 1998	13 October 1999	1 year, 208 days	Lok Shakti	Vajpayee II	Atal Bihari Vajpayee
Merged with Ministry of Industry to constitute the Ministry of Commerce and Industry.

=== Minister of Industry (1950–1999) ===
Key
^{†} Assassinated or died in office

Portrait	Minister (Birth-Death) Constituency	Term of office			Political party	Ministry	Prime Minister
Portrait	Minister (Birth-Death) Constituency	From	To	Period	Political party	Ministry	Prime Minister
Minister of Industry and Supply
	Syama Prasad Mukherjee (1901–1953); MCA for West Bengal	15 August 1947	19 April 1950	2 years, 247 days	Hindu Mahasabha	Nehru I	Jawaharlal Nehru
	Jawaharlal Nehru (1889–1964); MP for United Provinces (Prime Minister)	19 April 1950	13 May 1950	24 days		Nehru I	Jawaharlal Nehru
	Harekrushna Mahatab (1899–1987); MP for Orissa (Interim)	13 May 1950	26 December 1950	227 days		Nehru I	Jawaharlal Nehru
Merged with Ministry of Commerce during this interval.
Minister of Industry
	Nityanand Kanungo (1900–1988); MP for Cuttack (Minister of State)	19 July 1963	9 June 1964	326 days	Indian National Congress	Nehru IV	Jawaharlal Nehru
	Nityanand Kanungo (1900–1988); MP for Cuttack (Minister of State)	19 July 1963	9 June 1964	326 days	Indian National Congress	Nanda I	Gulzarilal Nanda
	Swaran Singh (1907–1994); MP for Jullundur	9 June 1964	20 June 1964	11 days	Indian National Congress	Shastri	Lal Bahadur Shastri
Minister of Industry and Supply
	Swaran Singh (1907–1994); MP for Jullundur	20 June 1964	19 July 1964	29 days	Indian National Congress	Shastri	Lal Bahadur Shastri
	H. C. Dasappa (1894–1964); MP for Bangalore	19 July 1964	29 October 1964^{[†]}	102 days	Indian National Congress	Shastri	Lal Bahadur Shastri
	Tribhuvan Narain Singh (1904–1982); Rajya Sabha MP for Uttar Pradesh (Minister of State)	30 October 1964	5 February 1965	98 days	Indian National Congress	Shastri	Lal Bahadur Shastri
Minister of Industry					Indian National Congress		
	Tribhuvan Narain Singh (1904–1982); Rajya Sabha MP for Uttar Pradesh (Minister of State)	5 February 1965	24 January 1966	353 days	Indian National Congress	Shastri	Lal Bahadur Shastri
	Tribhuvan Narain Singh (1904–1982); Rajya Sabha MP for Uttar Pradesh (Minister of State)	5 February 1965	24 January 1966	353 days	Indian National Congress	Nanda II	Gulzarilal Nanda
	Damodaram Sanjivayya (1921–1972); Rajya Sabha MP for Andhra Pradesh	24 January 1966	13 March 1967	1 year, 48 days	Indian National Congress	Indira I	Indira Gandhi
Minister of Industrial Development and Company Affairs
	Fakhruddin Ali Ahmed (1905–1977); MP for Barpeta	13 March 1967	14 February 1969	1 year, 338 days	Indian National Congress	Indira II	Indira Gandhi
Minister of Industrial Development, Internal Trade and Company Affairs
	Fakhruddin Ali Ahmed (1905–1977); MP for Barpeta	14 February 1969	27 June 1970	1 year, 133 days	Indian National Congress (R)	Indira II	Indira Gandhi
Minister of Industrial Development and Internal Trade
	Dinesh Singh (1925–1995); MP for Pratapgarh	27 June 1970	18 March 1971	264 days	Indian National Congress (R)	Indira II	Indira Gandhi
Minister of Industrial Development
	Moinul Hoque Choudhury (1923–1976); MP for Dhubri	18 March 1971	22 July 1972	1 year, 126 days	Indian National Congress (R)	Indira III	Indira Gandhi
	Chidambaram Subramaniam (1910–2000); MP for Krishnagiri	22 July 1972	10 October 1974	2 years, 80 days	Indian National Congress (R)	Indira III	Indira Gandhi
Minister of Industry and Civil Supplies
	T. A. Pai (1922–1981); Rajya Sabha MP for Karnataka	10 October 1974	9 August 1976	1 year, 304 days	Indian National Congress (R)	Indira III	Indira Gandhi
Minister of Industry
	T. A. Pai (1922–1981); Rajya Sabha MP for Karnataka	9 August 1976	24 March 1977	227 days	Indian National Congress (R)	Indira III	Indira Gandhi
	Morarji Desai (1896–1995); MP for Surat (Prime Minister)	24 March 1977	28 March 1977	2 days	Janata Party	Desai	Morarji Desai
	Brij Lal Varma (1916–1987); MP for Mahasamund	28 March 1977	6 July 1977	100 days	Janata Party	Desai	Morarji Desai
	George Fernandes (1930–2019); MP for Muzaffarpur	6 July 1977	15 July 1979	2 years, 9 days	Janata Party	Desai	Morarji Desai
	Morarji Desai (1896–1995); MP for Surat (Prime Minister)	15 July 1979	28 July 1979	13 days	Janata Party	Desai	Morarji Desai
	Charan Singh (1902–1987); MP for Baghpat (Prime Minister)	28 July 1979	30 July 1979	2 days	Janata Party (Secular)	Charan	Charan Singh
	Kasu Brahmananda Reddy (1909–1994); Rajya Sabha MP for Andhra Pradesh	30 July 1979	27 November 1979	120 days	Indian National Congress (U)	Charan	Charan Singh
	T. A. Pai (1922–1981); Rajya Sabha MP for Karnataka	27 November 1979	14 January 1980	48 days	Janata Party (Secular)	Charan	Charan Singh
	Ramaswamy Venkataraman (1910–2009); MP for Madras South	16 January 1980	3 April 1980	78 days	Indian National Congress	Indira IV	Indira Gandhi
	Indira Gandhi (1917–1984); MP for Medak (Prime Minister)	3 April 1980	8 August 1981	1 year, 127 days	Indian National Congress	Indira IV	Indira Gandhi
	N. D. Tiwari (1925–2018); MP for Nainital	8 August 1981	3 August 1984	2 years, 361 days	Indian National Congress	Indira IV	Indira Gandhi
	Indira Gandhi (1917–1984); MP for Medak (Prime Minister)	3 August 1984	14 August 1984	11 days	Indian National Congress	Indira IV	Indira Gandhi
	V. P. Singh (1931–2008); Rajya Sabha MP for Uttar Pradesh	14 August 1984	7 September 1984	24 days	Indian National Congress	Indira IV	Indira Gandhi
	Kotla Vijaya Bhaskara Reddy (1920–2001); MP for Kurnool	7 September 1984	31 October 1984	54 days	Indian National Congress	Indira IV	Indira Gandhi
Minister of Industry and Company Affairs
	Kotla Vijaya Bhaskara Reddy (1920–2001); MP for Kurnool	4 November 1984	31 December 1984	57 days	Indian National Congress	Rajiv I	Rajiv Gandhi
	Rajiv Gandhi (1944–1991); MP for Amethi (Prime Minister)	31 December 1984	14 January 1985	14 days	Indian National Congress	Rajiv II	Rajiv Gandhi
	Veerendra Patil (1924–1997); MP for Bagalkot	14 January 1985	25 September 1985	254 days	Indian National Congress	Rajiv II	Rajiv Gandhi
Minister of Industry
	N. D. Tiwari (1925–2018); Rajya Sabha MP for Uttar Pradesh	25 September 1985	22 October 1986	1 year, 27 days	Indian National Congress	Rajiv II	Rajiv Gandhi
	Jalagam Vengala Rao (1921–1999); MP for Khammam	22 October 1986	2 December 1989	3 years, 41 days	Indian National Congress	Rajiv II	Rajiv Gandhi
	V. P. Singh (1931–2008); MP for Fatehpur (Prime Minister)	2 December 1989	5 December 1989	3 days	Janata Dal	Vishwanath	V. P. Singh
	Ajit Singh (1939–2021); MP for Baghpat	6 December 1989	10 November 1990	339 days	Janata Dal	Vishwanath	V. P. Singh
	Chandra Shekhar (1927–2007); MP for Ballia (Prime Minister)	10 November 1990	21 June 1991	223 days	Samajwadi Janata Party (Rashtriya)	Chandra Shekhar	Chandra Shekhar
	P. V. Narasimha Rao (1921–2004); MP for Nandyal (Prime Minister)	21 June 1991	11 June 1995	3 years, 355 days	Indian National Congress	Rao	P. V. Narasimha Rao
	K. Karunakaran (1918–2010); Rajya Sabha MP for Kerala	11 June 1995	16 May 1996	340 days	Indian National Congress	Rao	P. V. Narasimha Rao
	Suresh Prabhu (born 1953); MP for Rajapur	16 May 1996	1 June 1996	16 days	Bharatiya Janata Party	Vajpayee I	Atal Bihari Vajpayee
	Murasoli Maran (1934–2003); MP for Chennai South	1 June 1996	19 March 1998	1 year, 291 days	Dravida Munnetra Kazhagam	Deve Gowda	H. D. Deve Gowda
	Murasoli Maran (1934–2003); MP for Chennai South	1 June 1996	19 March 1998	1 year, 291 days	Dravida Munnetra Kazhagam	Gujral	I. K. Gujral
	Sikander Bakht (1918–2004); Rajya Sabha MP for Madhya Pradesh	19 March 1998	13 October 1999	1 year, 208 days	Bharatiya Janata Party	Vajpayee II	Atal Bihari Vajpayee
Merged with Ministry of Industry to form Ministry of Commerce and Industry.

=== Minister of Commerce and Industry (1999–present) ===
Portrait	Minister (Birth-Death) Constituency	Term of office			Political party	Ministry	Prime Minister
Portrait	Minister (Birth-Death) Constituency	From	To	Period	Political party	Ministry	Prime Minister
	Murasoli Maran (1934–2003); MP for Chennai South	13 October 1999	9 November 2002	3 years, 27 days	Dravida Munnetra Kazhagam	Vajpayee III	Atal Bihari Vajpayee
	Arun Shourie (born 1941); Rajya Sabha MP for Uttar Pradesh	9 November 2002	29 January 2003	81 days	Bharatiya Janata Party	Vajpayee III	Atal Bihari Vajpayee
	Arun Jaitley (1952–2019); Rajya Sabha MP for Gujarat	29 January 2003	22 May 2004	1 year, 114 days	Bharatiya Janata Party	Vajpayee III	Atal Bihari Vajpayee
	Kamal Nath (born 1946); MP for Chhindwara	23 May 2004	22 May 2009	4 years, 364 days	Indian National Congress	Manmohan I	Manmohan Singh
	Anand Sharma (born 1953); Rajya Sabha MP for Rajasthan	28 May 2009	26 May 2014	4 years, 363 days	Indian National Congress	Manmohan II	Manmohan Singh
	Nirmala Sitharaman (born 1959); Rajya Sabha MP for Andhra Pradesh (Minister of State, I/C)	27 May 2014	3 September 2017	3 years, 99 days	Bharatiya Janata Party	Modi I	Narendra Modi
	Suresh Prabhu (born 1953); Rajya Sabha MP for Andhra Pradesh	3 September 2017	30 May 2019	1 year, 269 days	Bharatiya Janata Party	Modi I	Narendra Modi
	Piyush Goyal (born 1964); Rajya Sabha MP for Maharashtra, till 2024; MP for Mumbai North, from 2024	31 May 2019	Incumbent	7 years, 157 days	Bharatiya Janata Party	Modi II	Narendra Modi
	Piyush Goyal (born 1964); Rajya Sabha MP for Maharashtra, till 2024; MP for Mumbai North, from 2024	31 May 2019	Incumbent	7 years, 157 days	Bharatiya Janata Party	Modi III	Narendra Modi

== Ministers of State ==
=== Minister of State for Commerce (1947–1999) ===
Portrait	Minister (Birth-Death) Constituency	Term of office			Political party	Ministry	Prime Minister
Portrait	Minister (Birth-Death) Constituency	From	To	Period	Political party	Ministry	Prime Minister
Minister of State for Commerce and Industry
	D. P. Karmarkar (1902–1991); MP for Dharwad North	12 August 1952	13 June 1956	3 years, 306 days	Indian National Congress	Nehru II	Jawaharlal Nehru
	Manubhai Shah (1915–2000); MP for Jamnagar; Minister of Industrial Development	1 May 1956	13 June 1956	43 days	Indian National Congress	Nehru II	Jawaharlal Nehru
	D. P. Karmarkar (1902–1991); MP for Dharwad North; Minister of Trade	13 June 1956	30 August 1956	78 days	Indian National Congress	Nehru II	Jawaharlal Nehru
	Nityanand Kanungo (1900–1988); MP for Kendrapara; Minister of Consumer Industries	13 June 1956	30 August 1956	78 days	Indian National Congress	Nehru II	Jawaharlal Nehru
Minister of State for Commerce and Consumer Industries
	D. P. Karmarkar (1902–1991); MP for Dharwad North; Minister of Trade	30 August 1956	1 January 1957	124 days	Indian National Congress	Nehru II	Jawaharlal Nehru
	Nityanand Kanungo (1900–1988); MP for Kendrapara; Minister of Consumer Industries	30 August 1956	1 January 1957	124 days	Indian National Congress	Nehru II	Jawaharlal Nehru
Minister of State for Commerce and Industry
	D. P. Karmarkar (1902–1991); MP for Dharwad North; Minister of Trade	1 January 1957	17 April 1957	106 days	Indian National Congress	Nehru II	Jawaharlal Nehru
	Nityanand Kanungo (1900–1988); MP for Kendrapara; Minister of Consumer Industries	1 January 1957	17 April 1957	106 days	Indian National Congress	Nehru II	Jawaharlal Nehru
	Manubhai Shah (1915–2000); MP for Jamnagar; Minister of Industry, from 25 April 1957	17 April 1957	10 April 1962	4 years, 358 days	Indian National Congress	Nehru III	Jawaharlal Nehru
	Nityanand Kanungo (1900–1988); MP for Cuttack; Minister of Commerce, from 25 April 1957	17 April 1957	10 April 1962	4 years, 358 days	Indian National Congress	Nehru III	Jawaharlal Nehru
	Manubhai Shah (1915–2000); MP for Jamnagar; Minister of International Trade	10 April 1962	19 July 1963	1 year, 100 days	Indian National Congress	Nehru IV	Jawaharlal Nehru
	Nityanand Kanungo (1900–1988); MP for Cuttack; Minister of Industry	10 April 1962	19 July 1963	1 year, 100 days	Indian National Congress	Nehru IV	Jawaharlal Nehru
Minister of State for Commerce
	V. P. Singh (1931–2008); MP for Phulpur	23 December 1976	24 March 1977	91 days	Indian National Congress (R)	Indira III	Indira Gandhi
	Arif Beg (1935–2016); MP for Bhopal	14 August 1977	28 July 1979	1 year, 348 days	Janata Party	Desai	Morarji Desai
	Krishana Kumar Goyal (1933–2013); MP for Kota	14 August 1977	28 July 1979	1 year, 348 days	Janata Party	Desai	Morarji Desai
	Henry Austin (1920–2008); MP for Ernakulam	30 July 1979	14 January 1980	349 days	Indian National Congress (U)	Charan	Charan Singh
	Ziaur Rahman Ansari (1925–1992); MP for Unnao	3 March 1980	19 October 1980	230 days	Indian National Congress (I)	Indira IV	Indira Gandhi
	Khurshed Alam Khan (1919–2013); MP for Farrukhabad	19 October 1980	15 January 1982	1 year, 88 days	Indian National Congress (I)	Indira IV	Indira Gandhi
	Ram Dulari Sinha (1922–1994); MP for Sheohar	14 February 1983	7 February 1984	358 days	Indian National Congress (I)	Indira IV	Indira Gandhi
	Nihar Ranjan Laskar (born 1932); MP for Karimganj	7 February 1984	7 September 1984	213 days	Indian National Congress (I)	Indira IV	Indira Gandhi
	S. M. Krishna (born 1932); MP for Mandya	7 September 1984	31 October 1984	54 days	Indian National Congress (I)	Indira IV	Indira Gandhi
Minister of State for Commerce and Supply
	S. M. Krishna (born 1932); MP for Mandya	4 November 1984	31 December 1984	57 days	Indian National Congress (I)	Rajiv I	Rajiv Gandhi
	P. A. Sangma (1947–2016); MP for Tura	1 January 1985	29 September 1985	271 days	Indian National Congress (I)	Rajiv II	Rajiv Gandhi
Minister of State for Commerce
	Brahm Dutt (1926–2014); MP for Tehri Garhwal	29 September 1985	22 October 1986	1 year, 23 days	Indian National Congress (I)	Rajiv II	Rajiv Gandhi
	Priya Ranjan Dasmunsi (1945–2017); MP for Raiganj	22 October 1986	2 December 1989	3 years, 41 days	Indian National Congress (I)	Rajiv II	Rajiv Gandhi
	Arangil Sreedharan (1925–2001); Rajya Sabha MP for Kerala	23 April 1990	10 November 1990	201 days	Janata Dal	Vishwanath	V. P. Singh
	Prem Khandu Thungan (born 1946); MP for Arunachal West	21 June 1991	2 July 1992	1 year, 11 days	Indian National Congress (R)	Rao	P. V. Narasimha Rao
	P. J. Kurien (born 1941); MP for Mavelikara	10 July 1992	17 January 1993	191 days	Indian National Congress (R)	Rao	P. V. Narasimha Rao
	Kamaluddin Ahmed (1930–2018); MP for Hanamkonda	19 February 1993	29 September 1994	1 year, 222 days	Indian National Congress (R)	Rao	P. V. Narasimha Rao

=== Minister of State for Industry (1947–1999) ===
Portrait	Minister (Birth-Death) Constituency	Term of office			Political party	Ministry	Prime Minister
Portrait	Minister (Birth-Death) Constituency	From	To	Period	Political party	Ministry	Prime Minister
Minister of State for Industry
	Kotha Raghuramaiah (1912–1979); MP for Guntur; Minister of Supply	13 June 1964	20 June 1964	7 days	Indian National Congress	Shastri	Lal Bahadur Shastri
Minister of State for Industry and Supply
	Kotha Raghuramaiah (1912–1979); MP for Guntur; Minister of Supply; and Minister of Supply and Technical Development	20 June 1964	11 January 1966	1 year, 205 days	Indian National Congress	Shastri	Lal Bahadur Shastri
	Tribhuvan Narain Singh (1904–1982); Rajya Sabha MP for Uttar Pradesh; Minister of Heavy Engineering, until 5 February 1965; and Minister of Industry, from 5 February 1965	25 July 1964	11 January 1966	1 year, 170 days	Indian National Congress	Shastri	Lal Bahadur Shastri
	Kotha Raghuramaiah (1912–1979); MP for Guntur; Minister of Supply	11 January 1966	24 January 1966	13 days	Indian National Congress	Nanda II	Gulzarilal Nanda (Acting)
	Tribhuvan Narain Singh (1904–1982); Rajya Sabha MP for Uttar Pradesh; Minister of Industry	11 January 1966	24 January 1966	13 days	Indian National Congress	Nanda II	Gulzarilal Nanda (Acting)
Minister of State for Industry
	Bibudhendra Mishra (1928–2012); MP for Puri	24 January 1966	13 March 1967	1 year, 48 days	Indian National Congress	Indira I	Indira Gandhi
Minister of State for Industrial Development and Company Affairs
	K. V. Raghunatha Reddy (1924–2002); Rajya Sabha MP for Andhra Pradesh	13 March 1967	14 February 1969	1 year, 338 days	Indian National Congress	Indira II	Indira Gandhi
Minister of State for Industrial Development, Internal Trade and Company Affairs
	K. V. Raghunatha Reddy (1924–2002); Rajya Sabha MP for Andhra Pradesh	14 February 1969	27 June 1970	1 year, 133 days	Indian National Congress (R)	Indira II	Indira Gandhi
Minister of State for Industrial Development
	Ghanshyam Oza (1911–2002); MP for Rajkot	2 May 1971	17 March 1972	320 days	Indian National Congress (R)	Indira III	Indira Gandhi
	Mansinhji Bhasaheb Rana (1904–1974); MP for Broach	11 January 1974	31 July 1974^{[†]}	201 days	Indian National Congress (R)	Indira III	Indira Gandhi
Minister of State for Industry and Civil Supplies
	Anant Sharma (1919–1988); Rajya Sabha MP for Bihar	10 October 1974	9 August 1976	1 year, 304 days	Indian National Congress (R)	Indira III	Indira Gandhi
	Buddha Priya Maurya (1926–2004); MP for Hapur	10 October 1974	9 August 1976	1 year, 304 days	Indian National Congress (R)	Indira III	Indira Gandhi
	A. C. George; MP for Mukundapuram	10 October 1974	9 August 1976	1 year, 304 days	Indian National Congress (R)	Indira III	Indira Gandhi
Minister of State for Industry
	Anant Sharma (1919–1988); Rajya Sabha MP for Bihar	9 August 1976	24 March 1977	227 days	Indian National Congress (R)	Indira III	Indira Gandhi
	Buddha Priya Maurya (1926–2004); MP for Hapur	9 August 1976	24 March 1977	227 days	Indian National Congress (R)	Indira III	Indira Gandhi
	Abha Maiti (1925–1994); MP for Panskura	14 August 1977	28 July 1979	1 year, 348 days	Janata Party	Desai	Morarji Desai
	Jagadambi Prasad Yadav (1925–2002); MP for Godda	14 August 1977	26 January 1979	1 year, 165 days	Janata Party	Desai	Morarji Desai
	B. Rachaiah (1922–2000); MP for Chamarajanagar	4 August 1979	14 January 1980	163 days	Indian National Congress (U)	Charan Singh	Charan Singh
	Charanjit Chanana; Rajya Sabha MP for Delhi	3 March 1980	2 September 1982	2 years, 183 days	Indian National Congress (I)	Indira IV	Indira Gandhi
	Ram Dulari Sinha (1922–1994); MP for Sheohar	15 January 1982	14 February 1983	1 year, 30 days	Indian National Congress (I)	Indira IV	Indira Gandhi
	Virbhadra Singh (1934–2021); MP for Mandi	11 September 1982	8 April 1983	209 days	Indian National Congress (I)	Indira IV	Indira Gandhi
	S. M. Krishna (born 1932); MP for Mandya	29 January 1983	7 February 1984	1 year, 9 days	Indian National Congress (I)	Indira IV	Indira Gandhi
	S. B. P. Pattabhirama Rao (1911–1998); MP for Rajahmundry	7 February 1984	31 October 1984	267 days	Indian National Congress (I)	Indira IV	Indira Gandhi
	Nihar Ranjan Laskar (born 1932); MP for Karimganj	7 September 1984	31 October 1984	54 days	Indian National Congress (I)	Indira IV	Indira Gandhi
	S. B. P. Pattabhirama Rao (1911–1998); MP for Rajahmundry	4 November 1984	31 December 1984	57 days	Indian National Congress (I)	Rajiv I	Rajiv Gandhi
	Nihar Ranjan Laskar (born 1932); MP for Karimganj	12 November 1984	31 December 1984	49 days	Indian National Congress (I)	Rajiv I	Rajiv Gandhi
Minister of State for Industry and Company Affairs
	Arif Mohammad Khan (born 1951); MP for Bahraich	31 December 1984	25 September 1985	268 days	Indian National Congress (I)	Rajiv II	Rajiv Gandhi
Minister of State for Industry
	Rajkumar Jaichandra Singh (born 1942); Rajya Sabha MP for Manipur (D/o Chemicals and Petrochemicals)	25 September 1985	18 February 1988	2 years, 146 days	Indian National Congress (I)	Rajiv II	Rajiv Gandhi
	M. Arunachalam (1944–2004); MP for Tenkasi (D/o Industrial Development)	25 September 1985	2 December 1989	4 years, 68 days	Indian National Congress (I)	Rajiv II	Rajiv Gandhi
	K. K. Tewary (born 1942); MP for Buxar (D/o Public Enterprises)	12 May 1986	23 July 1987	1 year, 72 days	Indian National Congress (I)	Rajiv II	Rajiv Gandhi
	P. Namgyal (1937–2020); MP for Ladakh (D/o Chemicals and Petrochemicals)	4 July 1989	2 September 1989	60 days	Indian National Congress (I)	Rajiv II	Rajiv Gandhi
	Srikant Kumar Jena (born 1950); MP for Cuttack (D/o Small Scale, Agro and Rural Industries)	23 April 1990	10 November 1991	201 days	Janata Dal	Vishwanath	V. P. Singh
	P. J. Kurien (born 1941); MP for Mavelikara (D/o Small Scale, Agro and Rural Industries, from 2 July 1992)	21 June 1991	17 January 1993	1 year, 210 days	Indian National Congress (I)	Rao	P. V. Narasimha Rao
	Krishna Sahi (born 1931); MP for Begusarai (D/o Industrial Development)	2 July 1992	15 September 1995	3 years, 75 days	Indian National Congress (I)	Rao	P. V. Narasimha Rao
	Prem Khandu Thungan (born 1946); MP for Arunachal West (D/o Heavy Industries and Public Enterprises)	2 July 1992	18 January 1993	200 days	Indian National Congress (I)	Rao	P. V. Narasimha Rao
	C. Silvera (1935–2016); MP for Mizoram	15 September 1995	16 May 1996	244 days	Indian National Congress (I)	Rao	P. V. Narasimha Rao
	Sukhbir Singh Badal (born 1962); MP for Faridkot	20 March 1998	13 October 1999	1 year, 207 days	Shiromani Akali Dal	Vajpayee II	Atal Bihari Vajpayee
Merged with Ministry of Industry to form Ministry of Commerce and Industry.

=== Minister of State for Commerce and Industry (1999–present) ===
Portrait	Minister (Birth-Death) Constituency	Term of office			Political party	Ministry	Prime Minister
Portrait	Minister (Birth-Death) Constituency	From	To	Period	Political party	Ministry	Prime Minister
	Omar Abdullah (born 1970); MP for Srinagar	13 October 1999	22 July 2001	1 year, 282 days	Jammu and Kashmir National Conference	Vajpayee III	Atal Bihari Vajpayee
	Raman Singh (born 1952); MP for Rajnandgaon	13 October 1999	29 January 2003	3 years, 108 days	Bharatiya Janata Party	Vajpayee III	Atal Bihari Vajpayee
	Digvijay Singh (1955–2010); MP for Banka	22 July 2001	1 September 2001	41 days	Samata Party	Vajpayee III	Atal Bihari Vajpayee
	Rajiv Pratap Rudy (born 1962); MP for Chapra	1 September 2002	24 May 2003	265 days	Bharatiya Janata Party	Vajpayee III	Atal Bihari Vajpayee
	C. Vidyasagar Rao (born 1941); MP for Karimnagar	29 January 2003	22 May 2004	1 year, 114 days	Bharatiya Janata Party	Vajpayee III	Atal Bihari Vajpayee
	Satyabrata Mookherjee (1932–2023); MP for Krishnanagar	5 June 2003	22 May 2004	352 days	Bharatiya Janata Party	Vajpayee III	Atal Bihari Vajpayee
	S. S. Palanimanickam (born 1950); MP for Thanjavur	23 May 2004	25 May 2004	2 days	Dravida Munnetra Kazhagam	Manmohan I	Manmohan Singh
	E. V. K. S. Elangovan (born 1948); MP for Gobichettipalayam	25 May 2004	29 January 2006	1 year, 249 days	Indian National Congress	Manmohan I	Manmohan Singh
	Ashwani Kumar (born 1952); Rajya Sabha MP for Punjab (D/o Industrial Policy and Promotion)	29 January 2006	22 May 2009	3 years, 113 days	Indian National Congress	Manmohan I	Manmohan Singh
	Jairam Ramesh (born 1954); Rajya Sabha MP for Andhra Pradesh (D/o Commerce)	31 January 2006	25 February 2009	3 years, 25 days	Indian National Congress	Manmohan I	Manmohan Singh
	Jyotiraditya Scindia (born 1971); MP for Guna	28 May 2009	28 October 2012	3 years, 153 days	Indian National Congress	Manmohan II	Manmohan Singh
	Daggubati Purandeswari (born 1959); MP for Visakhapatnam	28 October 2012	11 March 2014	1 year, 134 days	Indian National Congress	Manmohan II	Manmohan Singh
	S. Jagathrakshakan (born 1950); MP for Arakkonam	2 November 2012	20 March 2013	138 days	Dravida Munnetra Kazhagam	Manmohan II	Manmohan Singh
	E. M. Sudarsana Natchiappan (born 1946); Rajya Sabha MP for Tamil Nadu	17 June 2013	26 May 2014	343 days	Indian National Congress	Manmohan II	Manmohan Singh
	C. R. Chaudhary (born 1948); MP for Nagaur	3 September 2017	30 May 2019	1 year, 269 days	Bharatiya Janata Party	Modi I	Narendra Modi
	Hardeep Singh Puri (born 1952); Rajya Sabha MP for Uttar Pradesh	31 May 2019	7 July 2021	2 years, 37 days	Bharatiya Janata Party	Modi II	Narendra Modi
	Som Parkash (born 1949); MP for Hoshiarpur	31 May 2019	9 June 2024	5 years, 9 days	Bharatiya Janata Party	Modi II	Narendra Modi
	Anupriya Patel (born 1981); MP for Mirzapur	7 July 2021	9 June 2024	2 years, 338 days	Apna Dal (Sonelal)	Modi II	Narendra Modi
	Jitin Prasada (born 1973); MP for Pilibhit	10 June 2024	Incumbent	2 years, 147 days	Bharatiya Janata Party	Modi III	Narendra Modi

== See also ==
- Make in India
- Indian Trade Service
- Foreign trade of India
- Special economic zone
- Directorate General of Foreign Trade
- List of largest trading partners of India
- Multi-Modal Logistics Parks in India
