= Second Nehru ministry =

Government of India, 1952–1957

Second Jawaharlal Nehru ministry
- 2nd ministry of the Republic of India
- Date formed: 15 April 1952
- Date dissolved: 4 April 1957

People and organisations
- Head of state: Rajendra Prasad
- Head of government: Jawaharlal Nehru
- Member party: Indian National Congress
- Status in legislature: Majority
- Opposition party: None
- Opposition leader: None

History
- Election: 1951
- Outgoing election: 1957
- Legislature terms: 4 years, 11 months and 20 days
- Predecessor: First Nehru ministry
- Successor: Third Nehru ministry

Jawaharlal Nehru was sworn in as Prime Minister of India on 15 August 1947. After first Indian general election, Nehru became the first democratically elected Prime Minister of the country and his second term started on 15 April 1952. In his ministry upon reelection, the ministers were as follows.

== Cabinet ==
=== Cabinet ministers ===
Cabinet
Portfolio	Minister	Took office	Left office	Party	Ref
Prime Minister; Minister of External Affairs; Minister of Defence (1952-10 January 1955; from 30 January 1957)	Jawaharlal Nehru	First Nehru Ministry	Third Nehru ministry	INC	
Minister without Portfolio (External Affairs)	V. K. Krishna Menon	14 February 1956	Third Nehru Ministry	INC	
Minister of Education, Natural Resources and Scientific Research	Abul Kalam Azad	15 April 1952	Third Nehru ministry	INC	
Minister of Finance	C. D. Deshmukh	First Nehru ministry	24 July 1956	INC	
Minister of Finance	T. T. Krishnamachari	1 September 1956	Third Nehru ministry	INC	
Minister of Home Affairs (Minister of Heavy Industries - additional charge from September–November 1956)	Kailash Nath Katju	First Nehru ministry	1955	INC	
Minister of Home Affairs (Minister of Heavy Industries - additional charge from September–November 1956)	Govind Ballabh Pant	10 January 1955	Third Nehru ministry	INC	
Minister of Food and Agriculture	Rafi Ahmed Kidwai	First Nehru Ministry	1954	INC	
Minister of Food and Agriculture	Ajit Prasad Jain	25 November 1954	Third Nehru ministry	INC	
Minister of Defence	Baldev Singh	First Nehru Ministry	1952	INC	
Minister of Defence	N. Gopalaswami Ayyangar	13 May 1952	1952	INC	
Minister of Defence	Kailash Nath Katju	10 January 1955	30 January 1957	INC	
Minister of Law and Minority Affairs	Charu Chandra Biswas	15 April 1952	Third Nehru Ministry	INC	
Minister of Railways	N. Gopalaswami Ayyangar	First Nehru Ministry	13 May 1952	INC	
Minister of Railways	Lal Bahadur Shastri	13 May 1952	7 December 1956	INC	
Minister of Railways	Jagjivan Ram	7 December 1956	Third Nehru Ministry	INC	
Minister of Communications	Jagjivan Ram	15 April 1952	7 December 1956	INC	
Minister of Commerce and Industry (to September 1956); Minister of Iron and Steel (from June 1955)	T. T. Krishnamachari	15 April 1952	Third Nehru ministry	INC	
Minister of Heavy Industry and Commerce and Consumer Industries (to January 1957); Minister of Commerce and Industries (from January 1957)	Morarji Desai	14 November 1956	Third Nehru ministry	INC	
Minister of Labour	V. V. Giri	15 April 1952	September 1954	INC	
Minister of Labour	Khandubhai Kasanji Desai	September 1954	Third Nehru Ministry	INC	
Minister of Works, Housing and Supply (Ministry of Commerce and Consumer Industries - additional charge September–November 1956)	Swaran Singh	15 April 1952	Third Nehru Ministry	INC	
Minister of Planning and River Valley Schemes	Gulzarilal Nanda	15 April 1952	Third Nehru Ministry	INC	
Minister of Health	Amrit Kaur	15 April 1952	Third Nehru Ministry	INC	
Minister of Production	K. Chengalaraya Reddy	15 April 1952	Third Nehru Ministry	INC	

=== Ministers of State ===
Cabinet
Portfolio	Minister	Took office	Left office	Party	Ref
Minister of Parliamentary Affairs	Satya Narayan Sinha	First Nehru ministry	Third Nehru ministry	INC	
Minister of Rehabilitation	Ajit Prasad Jain	15 April 1952	24 November 1954	INC	
Minister of Rehabilitation	Mehr Chand Khanna	7 December 1954	Third Nehru ministry	INC	
Minister of State (External Affairs)	Syed Mahmud	7 December 1954	Third Nehru ministry	INC	
Minister of Agriculture	Panjabrao Deshmukh	17 April 1952	Third Nehru ministry	INC	
Minister of Legal Affairs; Minister of Civil Aviation (from 7 December 1956, additional charge)	Hari Vinayak Pataskar	7 December 1954	Third Nehru ministry	INC	
Minister of Natural Resources	Keshav Dev Malaviya	7 December 1954	Third Nehru ministry	INC	
Minister of Revenue and Expenditure	Mahavir Tyagi	15 April 1952	16 March 1953	INC	
Minister of Revenue and Civil Expenditure	Manilal Chaturbhai Shah	7 December 1954	Third Nehru ministry	INC	
Minister of Revenue and Defence Expenditure	Arun Chandra Guha	7 December 1954	Third Nehru ministry	INC	
Minister of Defence Organisation	Mahavir Tyagi	16 March 1953	Third Nehru ministry	INC	
Minister of Commerce (Minister of Trade from June 1956)	D. P. Karmarkar	6 August 1955	Third Nehru ministry	INC	
Minister of Industries (Minister of Consumer Industries from June 1956)	Nityanand Kanungo	6 August 1955	Third Nehru ministry	INC	
Minister of Industrial Development (Minister of Heavy Industry from June 1956)	Manubhai Shah	May 1956	Third Nehru ministry	INC	
Minister of Information and Broadcasting	B. V. Keskar	15 April 1952	Third Nehru Ministry	INC	
Minister of State (Home Affairs)	B. N. Datar	14 February 1956	Third Nehru Ministry	INC	
Minister of Community Development	S. K. Dey	September 1956	Third Nehru Ministry	INC	
Minister of Communications	Raj Bahadur	14 February 1956	Third Nehru Ministry	INC	
