= Minister of External Affairs (India) =

Head of the Ministry of External Affairs

Minister of External Affairs of the Republic of India
- Videś Mantrī
- Logo of The MEA

- Flag of The Republic of India

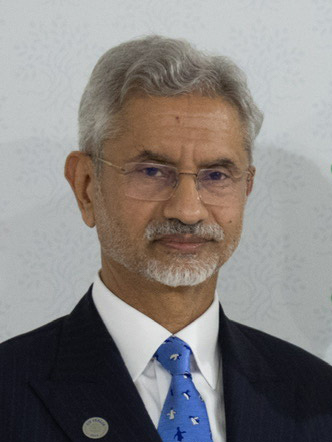
- Incumbent; S. Jaishankar since 30 May 2019
- Ministry of External Affairs
- Abbreviation: MEA
- Member of: Union Cabinet of India; Cabinet Committee on Security
- Reports to: President of India; Prime Minister of India; Parliament of India
- Appointer: President of India on the recommendation of the Prime Minister
- Term length: Five years (renewable)
- Formation: 1947
- First holder: Jawaharlal Nehru
- Unofficial names: Foreign Minister
- Deputy: Minister of State for External Affairs

The Minister of External Affairs (or simply the External Affairs Minister; Hindi: Videsh Mantri) is the head of the Ministry of External Affairs of the Government of India. One of the senior-most offices in the union cabinet, the chief responsibility of the minister of external affairs is to represent the government of India in the international community and advance its interests on the global stage. As such, the minister plays an important role in shaping and directing the country's foreign policy. Typically, the minister is assisted by one or more junior ministers, known as Ministers of State (MoS) for External Affairs.

The role, created when India became independent in August 1947 as Minister of External and Commonwealth Affairs, was held by India's first prime minister, Jawaharlal Nehru throughout his 17-year premiership; Nehru remains the longest serving external affairs minister followed by S. Jaishankar, the incumbent minister. It was renamed Minister of External Affairs upon India's becoming of a republic in 1950.

Several other Prime Ministers have since held the additional charge as the Minister of External Affairs, but never has any other cabinet minister held additional charge of the office—although during Nehru's premiership, V. K. Krishna Menon was acknowledged as de facto minister of external affairs beyond his official designation as defence minister. There have been a number of external affairs ministers who went on to become the prime minister like Atal Bihari Vajpayee, P. V. Narasimha Rao and I. K. Gujral. Two former career-diplomats have served as ministers of external affairs, including Natwar Singh (2004–2005) who served as India's ambassador to Poland and as high commissioner to Pakistan, and the current minister S. Jaishankar who retired as the foreign secretary. Two other ministers, M. C. Chagla and I. K. Gujral also served as ambassadors, with Chagla serving as India's ambassador to the United States and high commissioner to the United Kingdom, while Gujral served as ambassador to the Soviet Union.

The current minister of external affairs is S. Jaishankar, who succeeded Sushma Swaraj of the Bharatiya Janata Party on 30 May 2019.

== Cabinet Ministers ==
Portrait	Minister (Birth-Death) Constituency	Term of office			Political party	Ministry	Prime Minister
Portrait	Minister (Birth-Death) Constituency	From	To	Period	Political party	Ministry	Prime Minister
Minister of External and Commonwealth Affairs
	Jawaharlal Nehru (1889–1964); MCA for the United Provinces (Prime Minister)	15 August 1947	26 January 1950	2 years, 164 days	Indian National Congress	Nehru I	Self
Minister of External Affairs
	Jawaharlal Nehru (1889–1964); MCA for the United Provinces (until 1952); MP for Phulpur (from 1952) (Prime Minister)	26 January 1950	27 May 1964^{[†]}	14 years, 122 days	Indian National Congress	Nehru I	Self
	Jawaharlal Nehru (1889–1964); MCA for the United Provinces (until 1952); MP for Phulpur (from 1952) (Prime Minister)	26 January 1950	27 May 1964^{[†]}	14 years, 122 days	Indian National Congress	Nehru II	Self
	Jawaharlal Nehru (1889–1964); MCA for the United Provinces (until 1952); MP for Phulpur (from 1952) (Prime Minister)	26 January 1950	27 May 1964^{[†]}	14 years, 122 days	Indian National Congress	Nehru III	Self
	Jawaharlal Nehru (1889–1964); MCA for the United Provinces (until 1952); MP for Phulpur (from 1952) (Prime Minister)	26 January 1950	27 May 1964^{[†]}	14 years, 122 days	Indian National Congress	Nehru IV	Self
	Gulzarilal Nanda (1898–1998); MP for Sabarkantha (Prime Minister)	27 May 1964	9 June 1964	13 days	Indian National Congress	Nanda I	Self
	Lal Bahadur Shastri (1904–1966); MP for Allahabad (Prime Minister)	9 June 1964	17 July 1964	38 days	Indian National Congress	Shastri	Lal Bahadur Shastri
	Swaran Singh (1907–1994); MP for Jullundur	17 July 1964	11 January 1966	2 years, 120 days	Indian National Congress	Shastri	Lal Bahadur Shastri
	Swaran Singh (1907–1994); MP for Jullundur	11 January 1966	24 January 1966	2 years, 120 days	Indian National Congress	Nanda II	Gulzarilal Nanda
	Swaran Singh (1907–1994); MP for Jullundur	24 January 1966	14 November 1966	2 years, 120 days	Indian National Congress	Indira I	Indira Gandhi
	M. C. Chagla (1900–1981); Rajya Sabha MP for Maharashtra	14 November 1966	13 March 1967	295 days	Indian National Congress	Indira I	Indira Gandhi
	M. C. Chagla (1900–1981); Rajya Sabha MP for Maharashtra	13 March 1967	5 September 1967	295 days	Indian National Congress	Indira II	Indira Gandhi
	Indira Gandhi (1917–1984); MP for Rae Bareli (Prime Minister)	6 September 1967	13 February 1969	1 year, 160 days	Indian National Congress	Indira II	Indira Gandhi
	Dinesh Singh (1925–1995); MP for Pratapgarh	14 February 1969	27 June 1970	1 year, 133 days	Indian National Congress (R)	Indira II	Indira Gandhi
	Swaran Singh (1907–1994); MP for Jullundur	27 June 1970	18 March 1971	4 years, 105 days	Indian National Congress (R)	Indira II	Indira Gandhi
	Swaran Singh (1907–1994); MP for Jullundur	18 March 1971	10 October 1974	4 years, 105 days	Indian National Congress (R)	Indira III	Indira Gandhi
	Yashwantrao Chavan (1913–1984); MP for Satara	10 October 1974	24 March 1977	2 years, 165 days	Indian National Congress (R)	Indira III	Indira Gandhi
	Atal Bihari Vajpayee (1924–2018); MP for New Delhi	26 March 1977	28 July 1979	2 years, 124 days	Janata Party	Desai	Morarji Desai
	Shyam Nandan Prasad Mishra (1920–2004); MP for Begusarai	28 July 1979	14 January 1980	170 days	Janata Party (Secular)	Charan	Charan Singh
	P. V. Narasimha Rao (1921–2004); MP for Hanamkonda	14 January 1980	19 July 1984	4 years, 187 days	Indian National Congress	Indira IV	Indira Gandhi
	Indira Gandhi (1917–1984); MP for Medak (Prime Minister)	19 July 1984	31 October 1984^{†}	104 days	Indian National Congress	Indira IV	Indira Gandhi
	Shankarrao Chavan (1920–2004); MP for Nanded (Minister without portfolio assisting the Prime Minister)	19 July 1984	2 August 1984	14 days	Indian National Congress	Indira IV	Indira Gandhi
	Rajiv Gandhi (1944–1991); MP for Amethi (Prime Minister)	31 October 1984	31 December 1984	328 days	Indian National Congress	Rajiv I	Rajiv Gandhi
	Rajiv Gandhi (1944–1991); MP for Amethi (Prime Minister)	31 December 1984	24 September 1985	328 days	Indian National Congress	Rajiv	Rajiv Gandhi
	Bali Ram Bhagat (1922–2011); MP for Arrah	24 September 1985	12 May 1986	230 days	Indian National Congress	Rajiv	Rajiv Gandhi
	P. Shiv Shankar (1929–2017); Rajya Sabha MP for Gujarat	12 May 1986	22 October 1986	163 days	Indian National Congress	Rajiv	Rajiv Gandhi
	N. D. Tiwari (1925–2018); Rajya Sabha MP for Uttar Pradesh	22 October 1986	25 July 1987	276 days	Indian National Congress	Rajiv	Rajiv Gandhi
	Rajiv Gandhi (1944–1991); MP for Amethi (Prime Minister)	25 July 1987	25 June 1988	336 days	Indian National Congress	Rajiv	Rajiv Gandhi
	P. V. Narasimha Rao (1921–2004); MP for Ramtek	25 June 1988	2 December 1989	1 year, 160 days	Indian National Congress	Rajiv	Rajiv Gandhi
	V. P. Singh (1931–2008); MP for Fatehpur (Prime Minister)	2 December 1989	5 December 1989	3 days	Janata Dal	Vishwanath	V. P. Singh
	Inder Kumar Gujral (1919–2012); MP for Jalandhar	5 December 1989	10 November 1990	340 days	Janata Dal	Vishwanath	V. P. Singh
	Chandra Shekhar (1927–2007); MP for Ballia (Prime Minister)	10 November 1990	21 November 1990	11 days	Samajwadi Janata Party (Rashtriya)	Chandra Shekhar	Chandra Shekhar
	Vidya Charan Shukla (1929–2013); MP for Mahasamund	21 November 1990	20 February 1991	91 days	Samajwadi Janata Party (Rashtriya)	Chandra Shekhar	Chandra Shekhar
	Chandra Shekhar (1927–2007); MP for Ballia (Prime Minister)	20 February 1991	21 June 1991	121 days	Samajwadi Janata Party (Rashtriya)	Chandra Shekhar	Chandra Shekhar
	Madhavsinh Solanki (1927–2021); Rajya Sabha MP for Gujarat	21 June 1991	31 March 1992	284 days	Indian National Congress	Rao	P. V. Narasimha Rao
	P. V. Narasimha Rao (1921–2004); MP for Nandyal (Prime Minister)	31 March 1992	18 January 1993	293 days	Indian National Congress	Rao	P. V. Narasimha Rao
	Dinesh Singh (1925–1995); Rajya Sabha MP for Uttar Pradesh	18 January 1993	10 February 1995	2 years, 23 days	Indian National Congress	Rao	P. V. Narasimha Rao
	Pranab Mukherjee (1935–2020); Rajya MP for West Bengal	10 February 1995	16 May 1996	1 year, 96 days	Indian National Congress	Rao	P. V. Narasimha Rao
	Atal Bihari Vajpayee (1924–2018); MP for Lucknow (Prime Minister)	16 May 1996	21 May 1996	5 days	Bharatiya Janata Party	Vajpayee I	Atal Bihari Vajpayee
	Sikander Bakht (1918–2004); Rajya Sabha MP for Madhya Pradesh	21 May 1996	1 June 1996	11 days	Bharatiya Janata Party	Vajpayee I	Atal Bihari Vajpayee
	Inder Kumar Gujral (1919–2012); Rajya Sabha MP for Bihar (Prime Minister from 21 April 1997)	1 June 1996	21 April 1997	1 year, 290 days	Janata Dal	Deve Gowda	H. D. Deve Gowda
	Inder Kumar Gujral (1919–2012); Rajya Sabha MP for Bihar (Prime Minister from 21 April 1997)	21 April 1997	19 March 1998	1 year, 290 days	Janata Dal	Gujral	Self
	Atal Bihari Vajpayee (1924–2018); MP for Lucknow (Prime Minister)	19 March 1998	5 December 1998	261 days	Bharatiya Janata Party	Vajpayee II	Atal Bihari Vajpayee
	Jaswant Singh (1938–2020); Rajya Sabha MP for Rajasthan	5 December 1998	13 October 1999	3 years, 208 days	Bharatiya Janata Party	Vajpayee II	Atal Bihari Vajpayee
	Jaswant Singh (1938–2020); Rajya Sabha MP for Rajasthan	13 October 1999	1 July 2002	3 years, 208 days	Bharatiya Janata Party	Vajpayee III	Atal Bihari Vajpayee
	Yashwant Sinha (born 1937); MP for Hazaribagh	1 July 2002	22 May 2004	1 year, 326 days	Bharatiya Janata Party	Vajpayee III	Atal Bihari Vajpayee
	Natwar Singh (1931–2024); Rajya Sabha MP for Rajasthan	23 May 2004	6 November 2005	1 year, 167 days	Indian National Congress	Manmohan I	Manmohan Singh
	Manmohan Singh (1932–2024); Rajya Sabha MP for Assam (Prime Minister)	6 November 2005	24 October 2006	352 days	Indian National Congress	Manmohan I	Manmohan Singh
	Pranab Mukherjee (1935–2020); MP for Jangipur	24 October 2006	22 May 2009	2 years, 210 days	Indian National Congress	Manmohan I	Manmohan Singh
	S. M. Krishna (1932–2024); Rajya Sabha MP for Karnataka	23 May 2009	28 October 2012	3 years, 158 days	Indian National Congress	Manmohan II	Manmohan Singh
	Salman Khurshid (born 1953); MP for Farrukhabad	28 October 2012	26 May 2014	1 year, 210 days	Indian National Congress	Manmohan II	Manmohan Singh
	Sushma Swaraj (1952–2019); MP for Vidisha	26 May 2014	30 May 2019	5 years, 4 days	Bharatiya Janata Party	Modi I	Narendra Modi
	S. Jaishankar (born 1955); Rajya Sabha MP for Gujarat	30 May 2019	Incumbent	7 years, 100 days	Bharatiya Janata Party	Modi II	Narendra Modi
	S. Jaishankar (born 1955); Rajya Sabha MP for Gujarat	30 May 2019	Incumbent	7 years, 100 days	Bharatiya Janata Party	Modi III	Narendra Modi

== Ministers of state ==
Portrait	Minister (Birth-Death) Constituency	Term of office			Political party	Ministry	Prime Minister
Portrait	Minister (Birth-Death) Constituency	From	To	Period	Political party	Ministry	Prime Minister
	Charu Chandra Biswas (1888–1960)	13 May 1950	13 May 1952	2 years, 0 days	Indian National Congress	Nehru I	Jawaharlal Nehru
	Syed Mahmud (1889–1971); MP for Gopalganj	7 December 1954	17 April 1957	2 years, 131 days	Indian National Congress	Nehru II	Jawaharlal Nehru
	Lakshmi N. Menon (1899–1994); Rajya Sabha MP for Bihar	16 April 1962	24 January 1966	3 years, 283 days	Indian National Congress	Nehru IV	Jawaharlal Nehru
	Lakshmi N. Menon (1899–1994); Rajya Sabha MP for Bihar	16 April 1962	24 January 1966	3 years, 283 days	Indian National Congress	Nanda I	Gulzarilal Nanda
	Lakshmi N. Menon (1899–1994); Rajya Sabha MP for Bihar	16 April 1962	24 January 1966	3 years, 283 days	Indian National Congress	Shastri	Lal Bahadur Shastri
	Lakshmi N. Menon (1899–1994); Rajya Sabha MP for Bihar	16 April 1962	24 January 1966	3 years, 283 days	Indian National Congress	Nanda II	Gulzarilal Nanda
	Dinesh Singh (1925–1995); Rajya Sabha MP for Uttar Pradesh	24 January 1966	13 March 1967	1 year, 48 days	Indian National Congress	Indira I	Indira Gandhi
	Bali Ram Bhagat (1922–2011); MP for Arrah	14 November 1967	14 February 1969	1 year, 92 days	Indian National Congress	Indira II	Indira Gandhi
	Surendra Pal Singh (1917–2009); MP for Bulandshahr	5 February 1973	10 October 1974	1 year, 247 days	Indian National Congress (R)	Indira III	Indira Gandhi
	Samarendra Kundu (1930–1993); MP for Balasore	14 August 1977	28 July 1979	1 year, 348 days	Janata Party	Desai	Morarji Desai
	Bedabrata Barua (born 1928); MP for Kaliabor	4 August 1979	14 January 1980	163 days	Indian National Congress (Urs)	Charan	Charan Singh
	A. A. Rahim (1920–1995); MP for Chirayinkil	2 September 1982	31 October 1984	2 years, 59 days	Indian National Congress (I)	Indira IV	Indira Gandhi
	Ram Niwas Mirdha (1924–2010); Rajya Sabha MP for Rajasthan	2 August 1984	31 October 1984	90 days	Indian National Congress (I)	Indira IV	Indira Gandhi
	A. A. Rahim (1920–1995); MP for Chirayinkil	4 November 1984	31 December 1984	57 days	Indian National Congress (I)	Rajiv I	Rajiv Gandhi
	Ram Niwas Mirdha (1924–2010); Rajya Sabha MP for Rajasthan	4 November 1984	31 December 1984	57 days	Indian National Congress (I)	Rajiv I	Rajiv Gandhi
	Khurshed Alam Khan (1919–2013); MP for Farrukhabad	31 December 1984	25 September 1985	268 days	Indian National Congress (I)	Rajiv II	Rajiv Gandhi
	K. R. Narayanan (1921–2005); MP for Ottapalam	25 September 1985	22 October 1986	1 year, 27 days	Indian National Congress (I)	Rajiv II	Rajiv Gandhi
	Eduardo Faleiro (born 1940); MP for Mormugao	12 May 1986	14 February 1988	1 year, 278 days	Indian National Congress (I)	Rajiv II	Rajiv Gandhi
	Natwar Singh (1929–2024); MP for Bharatpur	22 October 1986	2 December 1989	3 years, 41 days	Indian National Congress (I)	Rajiv II	Rajiv Gandhi
	Kamla Kant Tiwari; MP for Buxar	25 June 1988	22 April 1989	301 days	Indian National Congress (I)	Rajiv II	Rajiv Gandhi
	Hari Kishore Singh (1934–2013); MP for Sheohar	23 April 1990	10 November 1990	201 days	Indian People's Front	Vishwanath	Vishwanath Pratap Singh
	Eduardo Faleiro (born 1940); MP for Mormugao	21 June 1991	18 January 1993	1 year, 211 days	Indian National Congress	Rao	P. V. Narasimha Rao
	R. L. Bhatia (1920–2021); MP for Amritsar	2 July 1992	16 May 1993	318 days	Indian National Congress	Rao	P. V. Narasimha Rao
	Salman Khurshid (born 1953); MP for Farrukhabad	18 January 1993	16 May 1996	3 years, 119 days	Indian National Congress	Rao	P. V. Narasimha Rao
	Saleem Iqbal Shervani (born 1953); MP for Badaun	9 June 1997	19 March 1998	332 days	Samajwadi Party	Gujral	Inder Kumar Gujral
	Kamala Sinha (1932–2014); Rajya Sabha MP for Bihar	9 June 1997	19 March 1998	332 days	Janata Dal	Gujral	Inder Kumar Gujral
	Vasundhara Raje (born 1953); MP for Jhalawar	20 March 1998	13 October 1999	1 year, 207 days	Bharatiya Janata Party	Vajpayee II	Atal Bihari Vajpayee
	Ajit Kumar Panja (1936–2008); MP for Calcutta North East	13 October 1999	16 March 2001	1 year, 154 days	All India Trinamool Congress	Vajpayee III	Atal Bihari Vajpayee
	Krishnam Raju (1940–2022); MP for Narasapuram	30 September 2000	22 July 2001	295 days	Bharatiya Janata Party	Vajpayee III	Atal Bihari Vajpayee
	Omar Abdullah (born 1970); MP for Srinagar	22 July 2001	23 December 2002	1 year, 154 days	Jammu and Kashmir National Conference	Vajpayee III	Atal Bihari Vajpayee
	Digvijay Singh (1955–2010); MP for Banka	1 July 2002	22 May 2004	1 year, 326 days	Janata Dal (United)	Vajpayee III	Atal Bihari Vajpayee
	Vinod Khanna (1946–2017); MP for Gurdaspur	29 January 2003	22 May 2004	1 year, 114 days	Bharatiya Janata Party	Vajpayee III	Atal Bihari Vajpayee
	E. Ahamed (1938–2017); MP for Ponnani	23 May 2004	22 May 2009	4 years, 364 days	Indian Union Muslim League	Manmohan I	Manmohan Singh
	Rao Inderjit Singh (born 1951); MP for Mahendragarh	23 May 2004	29 January 2006	1 year, 251 days	Indian National Congress	Manmohan I	Manmohan Singh
	Anand Sharma (born 1953); Rajya Sabha MP for Himachal Pradesh	29 January 2006	22 May 2009	3 years, 113 days	Indian National Congress	Manmohan I	Manmohan Singh
	Preneet Kaur (born 1944); MP for Patiala	28 May 2009	26 May 2014	4 years, 363 days	Indian National Congress	Manmohan II	Manmohan Singh
	Shashi Tharoor (born 1956); MP for Thiruvananthapuram	28 May 2009	19 April 2010	326 days	Indian National Congress	Manmohan II	Manmohan Singh
	E. Ahamed (1938–2017); MP for Malappuram	19 January 2011	26 May 2014	3 years, 127 days	Indian Union Muslim League	Manmohan II	Manmohan Singh
	General; V. K. Singh (Retd.); PVSM AVSM YSM ADC (born 1950); MP for Ghaziabad	27 May 2014	30 May 2019	5 years, 3 days	Bharatiya Janata Party	Modi I	Narendra Modi
	M. J. Akbar (born 1951); Rajya Sabha MP for Madhya Pradesh	5 July 2016	17 October 2018	2 years, 104 days	Bharatiya Janata Party	Modi I	Narendra Modi
	V. Muraleedharan (born 1958); Rajya Sabha MP for Maharashtra	31 May 2019	9 June 2024	5 years, 9 days	Bharatiya Janata Party	Modi II	Narendra Modi
	Meenakshi Lekhi (born 1967); MP for New Delhi	7 July 2021	9 June 2024	2 years, 338 days	Bharatiya Janata Party	Modi II	Narendra Modi
	Rajkumar Ranjan Singh (born 1952); MP for Inner Manipur	7 July 2021	9 June 2024	2 years, 338 days	Bharatiya Janata Party	Modi II	Narendra Modi
	Kirti Vardhan Singh (born 1966); MP for Gonda	10 June 2024	Incumbent	2 years, 89 days	Bharatiya Janata Party	Modi III	Narendra Modi
	Pabitra Margherita (born 1974); Rajya Sabha MP for Assam	10 June 2024	Incumbent	2 years, 89 days	Bharatiya Janata Party	Modi III	Narendra Modi

== Deputy ministers ==
No.	Portrait	Minister (Birth-Death) Constituency	Term of office			Political party	Ministry	Prime Minister
No.	Portrait	Minister (Birth-Death) Constituency	From	To	Period	Political party	Ministry	Prime Minister
Deputy Minister of External Affairs and Commonwealth Relations
1		B. V. Keskar (1903–1984); MCA for Madras	7 December 1948	26 January 1950	1 year, 50 days	Indian National Congress	Nehru I	Jawaharlal Nehru
Deputy Minister of External Affairs
(1)		B. V. Keskar (1903–1984); MCA for Madras	31 January 1950	13 May 1952	2 years, 103 days	Indian National Congress	Nehru I	Jawaharlal Nehru
2		Anil Kumar Chanda (1906–1976); MP for Birbhum	12 August 1952	17 April 1957	4 years, 262 days	Indian National Congress	Nehru II	Jawaharlal Nehru
2		Anil Kumar Chanda (1906–1976); MP for Birbhum	17 April 1957	1 May 1957	4 years, 262 days	Indian National Congress	Nehru III	Jawaharlal Nehru
3		Lakshmi N. Menon (1899–1994); Rajya Sabha MP for Bihar	17 April 1957	10 April 1962	4 years, 358 days	Indian National Congress	Nehru III	Jawaharlal Nehru
4		Dinesh Singh (1925–1995); MP for Pratapgarh	8 May 1962	27 May 1964	3 years, 261 days	Indian National Congress	Nehru IV	Jawaharlal Nehru
4		Dinesh Singh (1925–1995); MP for Pratapgarh	27 May 1964	9 June 1964	3 years, 261 days	Indian National Congress	Nanda I	Gulzarilal Nanda
4		Dinesh Singh (1925–1995); MP for Pratapgarh	15 June 1964	11 January 1966	3 years, 261 days	Indian National Congress	Shastri	Lal Bahadur Shastri
4		Dinesh Singh (1925–1995); MP for Pratapgarh	11 January 1966	24 January 1966	3 years, 261 days	Indian National Congress	Nanda II	Gulzarilal Nanda
5		Surendra Pal Singh (1917–2009); MP for Bulandshahr	18 March 1967	18 March 1971	5 years, 352 days	Indian National Congress	Indira II	Indira Gandhi
5		Surendra Pal Singh (1917–2009); MP for Bulandshahr	18 March 1967	18 March 1971	5 years, 352 days	Indian National Congress (R)	Indira II	Indira Gandhi
5		Surendra Pal Singh (1917–2009); MP for Bulandshahr	18 March 1971	5 February 1973	5 years, 352 days	Indian National Congress (R)	Indira III	Indira Gandhi
6		Bipinpal Das (1923–2005); Rajya Sabha MP for Assam	17 October 1974	24 March 1977	2 years, 158 days	Indian National Congress (R)	Indira III	Indira Gandhi
7		Digvijay Singh (1955–2010); Rajya Sabha MP for Bihar	28 November 1990	21 June 1991	205 days	Samajwadi Janata Party (Rashtriya)	Chandra Shekhar	Chandra Shekhar

== Length of Tenure ==
=== Cabinet Ministers ===
#	Name of Minister	Party	Terms	Length of term	
#	Name of Minister	Party	Terms	Longest tenure	Total tenure
1	Jawaharlal Nehru	INC	2	14 years, 121 days	16 years, 285 days
2	S. Jaishankar	BJP	2	7 years, 100 days	7 years, 100 days
3	P. V. Narasimha Rao	INC	3	4 years, 187 days	6 years, 275 days
4	Swaran Singh	INC	5	4 years, 105 days	6 years, 225 days
5	Sushma Swaraj	BJP	1	5 years, 4 days	5 years, 4 days
6	Pranab Mukherjee	INC	2	2 years, 210 days	3 years, 305 days
7	Jaswant Singh	BJP	2	2 years, 262 days	3 years, 209 days
8	S. M. Krishna	INC	1	3 years, 158 days	3 years, 158 days
9	Dinesh Singh	INC	2	2 years, 23 days	3 years, 156 days
10	Atal Bihari Vajpayee	JP/BJP	3	2 years, 124 days	3 years, 25 days
11	Inder Kumar Gujral	JD	3	0 years, 340 days	2 years, 266 days
12	Yashwantrao Chavan	INC(R)	1	2 years, 165 days	2 years, 165 days
13	Yashwant Sinha	BJP	1	1 years, 325 days	1 years, 325 days
14	Rajiv Gandhi	INC	3	0 years, 336 days	1 year, 299 days
15	Indira Gandhi	INC	2	1 years, 160 days	1 years, 264 days
16	Salman Khurshid	INC	1	1 years, 210 days	1 years, 210 days
17	Natwar Singh	INC	1	1 years, 167 days	1 years, 167 days
18	Manmohan Singh	INC	1	0 years, 352 days	0 years, 352 days
19	M. C. Chagla	INC	2	0 years, 176 days	0 years, 295 days
20	Madhavsinh Solanki	INC	1	0 years, 284 days	0 years, 284 days
21	N. D. Tiwari	INC	1	0 years, 276 days	0 years, 276 days
22	Bali Ram Bhagat	INC	1	0 years, 230 days	0 years, 230 days
23	Shyam Nandan Prasad Mishra	JP(S)	1	0 years, 170 days	0 years, 170 days
24	P. Shiv Shankar	INC	1	0 years, 163 days	0 years, 163 days
25	Chandra Shekhar	SJP(R)	2	0 years, 121 days	0 years, 132 days
26	Vidya Charan Shukla	SJP(R)	1	0 years, 91 days	0 years, 91 days
27	Lal Bahadur Shastri	INC	1	0 years, 38 days	0 years, 38 days
28	Shankarrao Chavan	INC	1	0 years, 14 days	0 years, 14 days
29	Gulzarilal Nanda	INC	1	0 years, 13 days	0 years, 13 days
30	Sikander Bakht	BJP	1	0 years, 11 days	0 years, 11 days
31	V. P. Singh	JD	1	0 years, 3 days	0 years, 3 days

== See also ==
- Indian Foreign Secretary
- S Jaishankar
