= First Nehru ministry =

Union Council of Ministers headed by Jawaharlal Nehru

First Jawaharlal Nehru ministry
- First ministry of the Dominion of India and later the Republic of India

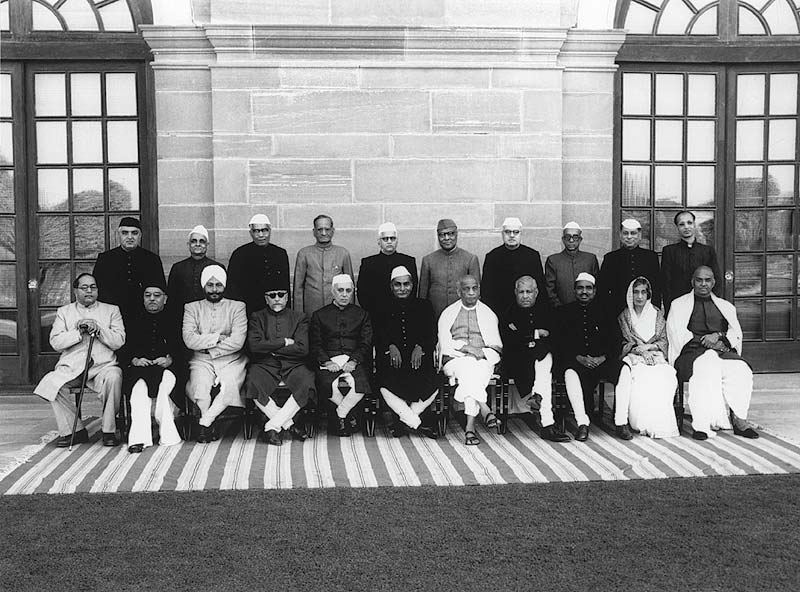
- The cabinet of India on 31 January 1950, along with the newly appointed President Rajendra Prasad.
- Date formed: 15 August 1947
- Date dissolved: 15 April 1952

People and organisations
- Head of State: George VI (1947–50); Rajendra Prasad (1950–52)
- Governor-General: The Viscount Mountbatten of Burma (1947–48); Chakravarti Rajagopalachari (1948–50)
- Prime minister: Jawaharlal Nehru
- Deputy Prime minister: Vallabhbhai Patel (until 15 December 1950)
- No. of ministers: 37
- Member party: Indian National Congress
- Status in legislature: Majority
- Opposition party: None
- Opposition leader: None

History
- Election: 1946 Indian Constituent Assembly election
- Outgoing election: 1945 Indian general election
- Legislature term: Constituent Assembly of India
- Predecessor: Interim
- Successor: Second Nehru ministry

After power transformation, on 15 August 1947, Jawaharlal Nehru assumed office as the first Prime Minister of India and chose fifteen ministers to form the First Nehru ministry.

== Background ==
The Constituent Assembly was set up while India was still under British rule, following negotiations between Indian leaders and members of the 1946 Cabinet Mission to India from the United Kingdom. The provincial assembly elections had been conducted early in 1946. The Constituent Assembly members were elected to it indirectly by the members of these newly elected provincial assemblies, and initially included representatives for those provinces which came to form part of Pakistan, some of which are now within Bangladesh. The Constituent Assembly had 299 representatives, including nine women.

The Interim Government of India was formed on 2 September 1946 from the newly elected Constituent Assembly. The Indian National Congress held a large majority in the Assembly, with 69 percent of all of the seats, while the Muslim League held almost all of the seats reserved in the Assembly for Muslims. There were also some members from smaller parties, such as the Scheduled Caste Federation, the Communist Party of India, and the Unionist Party. In June 1947, the delegations from the provinces of Sindh, East Bengal, Baluchistan, West Punjab, and the North West Frontier Province withdrew, to form the Constituent Assembly of Pakistan, meeting in Karachi. On 15 August 1947, the Dominion of India and Dominion of Pakistan became independent nations, and the members of the Constituent Assembly who had not withdrawn to Karachi became India's Parliament. Only 28 members of the Muslim League finally joined the Indian Assembly. Later, 93 members were nominated from the princely states. The Congress thus secured a majority of 82%

Jawaharlal Nehru took charge as the first Prime Minister of India on 15 August 1947, and chose 15 other members for his cabinet. Vallabhbhai Patel served as the first Deputy Prime Minister until his death on 15 December 1950. Lord Mountbatten, and later C. Rajagopalachari, served as Governor-General until 26 January 1950, when Rajendra Prasad was elected as the first President of India.

== Cabinet members ==
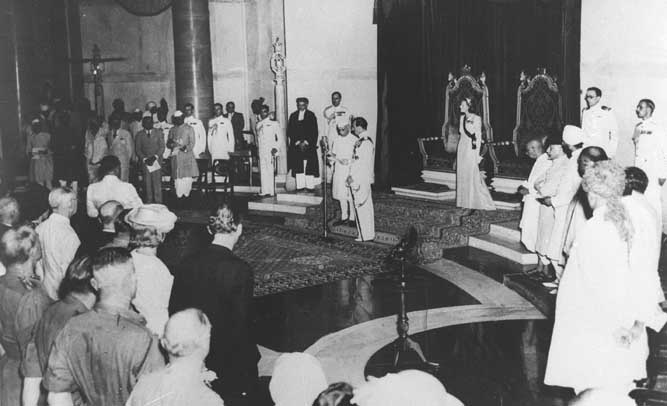
Lord Mountbatten swears in Jawaharlal Nehru as the first Prime Minister of India on 15 August 1947.

There were members from Hindu, Muslim, Christian, Sikh and Parsi communities represented in India's first ministry. There were two members from the Dalit community represented as well. Rajkumari Amrit Kaur was the only female Cabinet minister. The following is a list of the ministers in the first Cabinet.

Key

- ^{†} Died in office
- ^{RES} Resigned

Portfolio	Minister	Took office	Left office	Party
Prime Minister; Minister of External Affairs and Commonwealth Relations; Minister of Scientific Research	Jawaharlal Nehru	15 August 1947	Second Nehru ministry	INC
Deputy Prime Minister	Sardar Vallabhbhai Patel	15 August 1947	15 December 1950^{[†]}	INC
Minister of Home Affairs and States	Sardar Vallabhbhai Patel	15 August 1947	15 December 1950^{[†]}	INC
Minister of Home Affairs and States	C. Rajagopalachari	26 December 1950	25 October 1951^{[RES]}	INC
Minister of Home Affairs and States	Kailash Nath Katju	1951	Second Nehru ministry	INC
Minister of Information and Broadcasting	Sardar Vallabhbhai Patel	15 August 1947	1 April 1949	INC
Minister of Information and Broadcasting	R. R. Diwakar	1 April 1949	15 April 1952	INC
Minister of Finance	R. K. Shanmukham Chetty	15 August 1947	1948	Justice Party
Minister of Finance	John Matthai	6 May 1950	1950^{[RES]}	Independent
Minister of Finance	C. D. Deshmukh	1950	Second Nehru ministry	INC
Minister of Law and Justice	B. R. Ambedkar	15 August 1947	6 October 1951^{[RES]}	SCF
Minister of Defence	Baldev Singh	15 August 1947	Second Nehru ministry	Panthic Party
Minister of Railways and Minister of Transport	John Matthai	15 August 1947	22 September 1948	INC
Minister of Railways and Minister of Transport	N. Gopalaswami Ayyangar	22 September 1948	Second Nehru ministry	INC
Minister of Education	Maulana Abul Kalam Azad	15 August 1947	Second Nehru ministry	INC
Minister of Food and Agriculture	Rajendra Prasad	15 August 1947	14 Jan 1948	INC
Minister of Food and Agriculture	Jairamdas Daulatram	19 Jan 1948	13 May 1950^{[RES]}	INC
Minister of Industries and Supplies	Syama Prasad Mukherjee	15 August 1947	6 April 1950^{[RES]}	Hindu Mahasabha
Minister of Industries and Supplies	Harekrushna Mahatab	13 May 1950	26 December 1950^{[RES]}	INC
Minister of Labour	Jagjivan Ram	15 August 1947	15 April 1952	INC
Minister of Commerce	Cooverji Hormusji Bhabha	15 August 1947	15 April 1952	Independent
Minister of Communications	Rafi Ahmed Kidwai	15 August 1947	15 April 1952	INC
Minister of Health	Amrit Kaur	15 August 1947	15 April 1952	INC
Minister of Works, Mines and Power	Narhar Vishnu Gadgil	15 August 1947	15 April 1952	INC
Minister of Relief and Rehabilitation	K. C. Neogy	15 August 1947	April 1950^{[RES]}	INC
Minister without portfolio	N. Gopalaswami Ayyangar	15 August 1947	22 September 1948	INC
Minister without portfolio	Mohanlal Saxena	15 August 1947	15 April 1952	INC

== Deputy Ministers ==
S.no		Name			Period
1.	Deputy Minister of Works, Mines and Power	Surendranath Buragohain	14 August 1950	26 December 1950	134 days
1.	Deputy Minister of Works, Production and Supply	Surendranath Buragohain	26 December 1950	13 May 1952	1 year 139 days
2.	Deputy Minister of Information and Broadcasting	R. R. Diwakar	7 October 1948	26 January 1950	1 year 111 days
3.	Deputy Minister of Finance	Mahavir Tyagi	16 February 1951	13 May 1952	
4.	Minister of State for Railways	K. Santhanam	1 October 1948	10 March 1952	3 years, 241 days
4.	Minister of Road Transport and Highways	K. Santhanam	1 October 1948	17 April 1952	3 years 199 days
5.	Deputy Minister of Railways	B. V. Keskar	10 March 1952	13 May 1952	64 days
5.	Deputy Minister of External Affairs and Commonwealth Relations	B. V. Keskar	7 December 1948	26 January 1950	1 year, 50 days
5.	Deputy Minister of External Affairs	B. V. Keskar	31 January 1950	13 May 1952	2 years, 103 days
6.	Deputy Minister of Defence	Kumar Shree Himmatsinhji Jadeja	14 August 1950	29 February 1952	1 year, 199 days
7.	Deputy Minister of Food and Agriculture	Mosalikanti Thirumala Rao	21 August 1950	13 May 1952	1 year, 266 days
8.	Deputy Minister of Communications	Khurshed Lal	1 October 1948	29 January 1951	2 years, 120 days
9.	Deputy Minister of Communications	Raj Bahadur	29 January 1951	13 May 1952	1 year, 105 days
10.	Deputy Minister of Commerce and Industry	Dattatraya Parashuram Karmarkar	August	13 May	
11.	Deputy Minister of Parliamentary Affairs	Satya Narayan Sinha	1 October 1948	26 February 1949	148 days
12.	Deputy Minister of Home Affairs	Rustom Khurshedji Sidhwa	11 October 1951	13 May 1952	215 days
