= Purushottam Mangesh Laad =

Indian Civil Services officer (1905–1957)

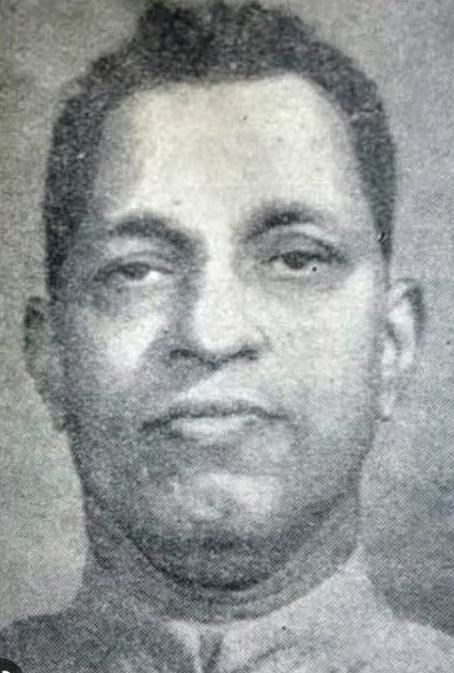
- Born: 29 March 1905; Vangali, Bardez, Portuguese Goa
- Died: March 1957 (aged 51–52); Bombay, India
- Occupations: Indian Civil Services officer, legal scholar, administrator, writer
- Writing career
- Pen name: Chikitsak M.A.

Purushottam Mangesh Laad (29 March 1905 – March 1957) was an Indian Civil Services officer, legal scholar, administrator, and writer known for his work in Marathi literary criticism and research on saint literature. During his career, he served as a judge, Legal Remembrancer, Secretary to the Government of Bombay, and Secretary in the Central Government's Ministry of Information and Broadcasting. He was instrumental in introducing major programming reforms at Akashvani, including the establishment of its Konkani section.

== Early life and education ==
Laad was born on 29 March 1905 in Vangali, Bardez. He received his primary education in Sawantwadi at his maternal grandparents' home. In 1922, he placed first in his Matriculation examination, winning several prizes and scholarships. During his early years, he developed a scholarship in both Marathi and Sanskrit.

He went on to study at Elphinstone College, where he secured first rank in the Inter Arts examination and was awarded the Sir Jeevandas Madhavdas Scholarship in Sanskrit. For his Bachelor of Arts degree, he shifted his focus to Economics and History, finishing first in both subjects.

Supported by a Tata Endowment scholarship from Delhi, Laad traveled to England to pursue higher studies at Cambridge University. Studying economics, he stood first in Part 1 of the Tripos examination in 1927, and completed Part 2 the following year to qualify as an economist. In the same year, he cleared the Indian Civil Services (ICS) examination and returned to India.

== Career ==
=== Civil and judicial service ===
Upon returning to India, Laad began his career as an Assistant Collector in Surat and Panchmahal. He was later appointed as a Sessions Judge across multiple locations, including Ahmednagar, Dhule, Ratnagiri, Thane, Belgaum, and Pune. During his judicial tenure, he earned public respect for his accessible and modest approach.

During the Quit India Movement of 1942, Laad delivered fair judgments to satyagrahis within the boundaries of the law, drawing displeasure from his superior officers.

In 1937, Laad took leave to go abroad and qualified as a barrister, securing the top position in Hindu Law. Following his legal qualification, he was appointed Secretary to the Government of Bombay and Legal Remembrancer. He also served briefly as Chief Secretary.

=== Ministry of Information and Broadcasting ===
Laad was later appointed Secretary in the Ministry of Information and Broadcasting under Union Minister Dr. Balkrishna Keskar. In this role, he instituted significant reforms to Akashvani's radio broadcasts. His key initiatives included launching the radio station's Konkani section and creating regional advisory boards to infuse literary quality into radio programming.

== Literary work ==
Laad's work in literature began in earnest after returning from abroad. Writing under the pseudonym "Chikitsak M.A.", he contributed book reviews and literary essays to the fortnightly magazine Pratibha. He compiled a collection of essays titled Krittika and published a poetry collection titled Madhupark.

His primary literary contribution was a critical research project on Sant Tukaram's Gatha and a biography of Tukaram built upon historical evidence. Laad wrote and published the first 14 chapters of this biography. Despite declining health, he later authored the 16th chapter. The 15th chapter was eventually published by Professor Priyolkar in Marathi Samshodhana Patrika. Laad was unable to complete the overall biography before his death.

Additionally, the Sahitya Akademi assigned Laad the task of translating comprehensive work on Kālidāsa into English, though this work also remained incomplete.

== Death ==
In March 1957, Laad died in Bombay at the age of 52 from a brain disorder.

== Legacy ==
In his honour, Akashvani conducts an annual lecture series named after him.
