= C. H. Bhabha =

Member of first cabinet of independent India

Cooverji Hormusji Bhabha
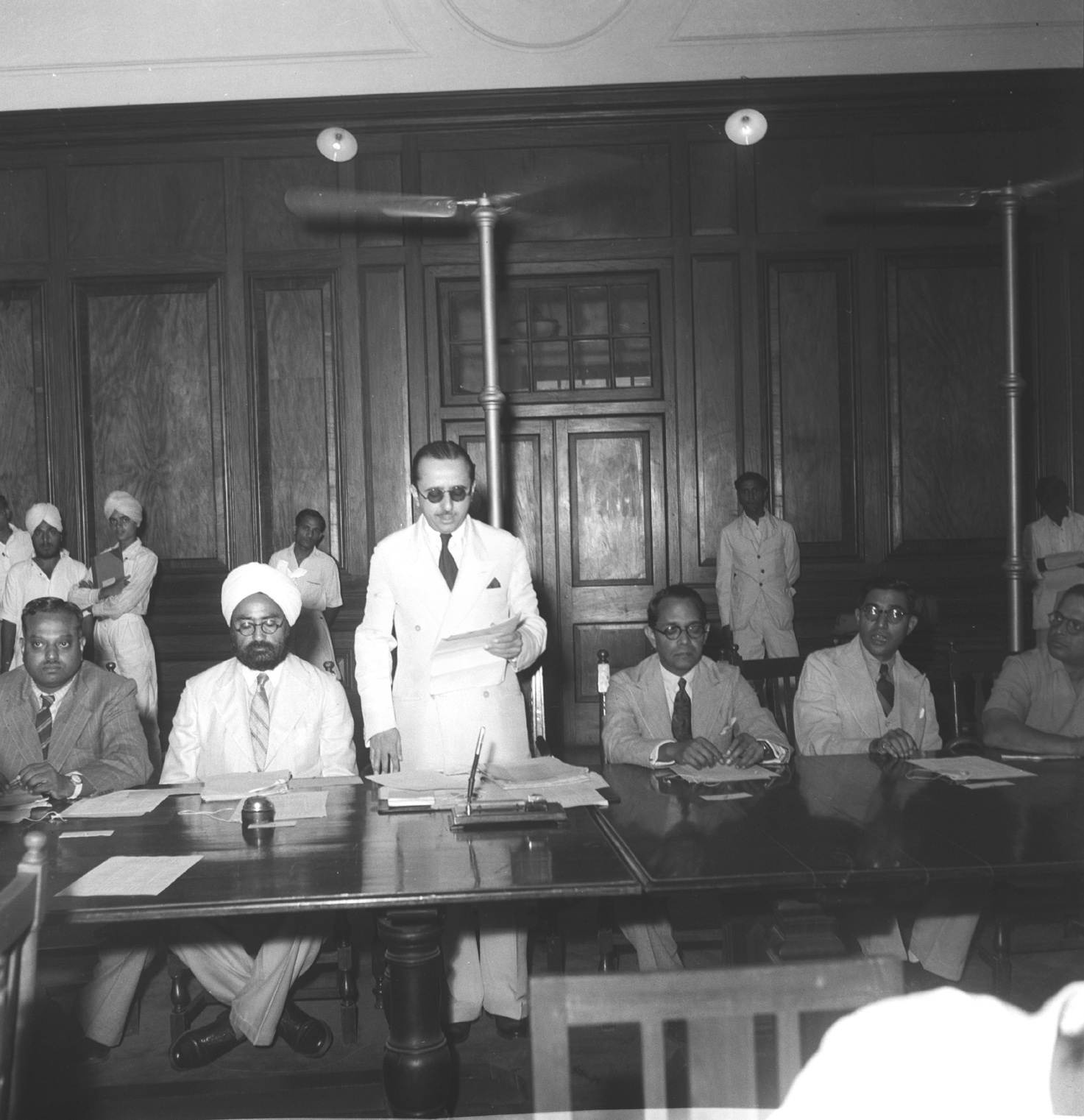
- Bhabha at a meeting of the Indian Oilseeds Committee in New Delhi in October 1947

1st Union Minister of Commerce
- In office 26 October 1946 – 6 April 1948
- Prime Minister: Jawaharlal Nehru
- Preceded by: Position established
- Succeeded by: Kshitish Chandra Neogy

Personal details
- Born: 22 July 1910 Bombay, Bombay Presidency, British India (now India)
- Died: 29 June 1986 (aged 75) London, United Kingdom

Cooverji Hormusji Bhabha more popularly known as C. H. Bhabha was a Parsi businessman who took charge of the Commerce portfolio in the First Cabinet of Independent India (from 15 August 1947). He was in charge of the "commerce department "in the interim government that took office on 26 October 1946 (announced on 25 August 1946). Not a very familiar face in the political circuit until he took charge, his nomination was made possible as Azad was keen on having a Parsi in the cabinet.

Before joining the government, Bhabha was a director in the Oriental Insurance Company. He was also the first cabinet minister to head the Special Emergency Committee, which was formed as a reaction to the communal riots breaking out in the capital.

He died suddenly of a heart attack in London on 29 June 1986. At the time of his death, he was one of the last surviving original members of the first cabinet of independent India; Jagjivan Ram, the last surviving original cabinet member, died one week later.
