= Indian Institute of Packaging =

Apex body for packaging in India

- College Logo
- Other name: IIP
- Motto: बेहतर जीवन के लिए पैकेजिंग
- Motto in English: Packaging for better living
- Type: Central Government
- Established: May 1966, 14; 60 years ago
- Parent institution: Ministry of Commerce and Industry (India)
- Accreditation: Autonomous
- Chairman: DR. Subodh Gupta
- Director: DR. R.K Mishra (IRS)
- Academic staff: 100
- Administrative staff: 150
- Students: 500+
- Undergraduates: 50
- Postgraduates: 500+
- Location: Mumbai (HQ), New Delhi, Ahmedabad, Kolkata, Hyderabad, Chennai
- Campus: Urban
- Website: iip-in.com

The Indian Institute of Packaging (IIP) is an autonomous apex body operating under the administrative control of the Ministry of Commerce and Industry, Government of India, established in 1966. Its objective is to improve the packaging standards in the country. The IIP is engaged in training and education, testing and certification, research and development, and consultancy and projects.

The IIP is headquartered in Mumbai, with centres in Delhi, Kolkata, Hyderabad, and Chennai. It provides postgraduate and undergraduate programmes in packaging. Testing and packaging facilities are at Ahmedabad and Chennai.

== History ==
It was set up in 1966 by packaging and allied industries and the Ministry of Commerce, Government of India, under the Societies Registration Act of 1860, as an apex body with the specific objective of improving the packaging standards in the country.

== Admission ==
Indian Institute of Packaging conducts all india common entrance test (IIP - CET) and Personal interview every year for admission into various courses based on marks obtained and personal interview IIP releases merit list for admission.

== Educational institutes ==
Indian Institute of Packaging runs educational programmes related to packaging. IIP conducts the All India Common Entrance Test (IIP-CET) and personal interview every year for the admission process. It has campuses in New Delhi, Mumbai, Kolkata, Chennai, Hyderabad, Ahmedabad. A new institute is being built in Visakhapatnam.

In 2021, the Government of India introduced a draft bill to declare IIP as an Institute of National Importance.

== Courses ==
1. Post Graduate Diploma in Packaging (PGDP): Two-year full time course in Mumbai, Kolkata and Ahmedabad campuses.
2. Diploma in Packaging through Correspondence (DPC): 18 months correspondence course in Chennai campus.
3. Certificate Course in Packaging - Intensive Training Course (ITC): Three-month full time certificate course.
4. Executive Development Programme (EDP): Short duration training course for working professionals.
5. Master in Packaging Technology, affiliation to Jawaharlal Nehru Technological University, in Hyderabad.
6. Master of Science in Packaging Technology, affiliation to Guru Gobind Singh Indraprastha University, in Delhi.
7. Bachelor of Science in Packaging Technology, affiliation to Guru Gobind Singh Indraprastha University, in Delhi.
8. Certified Packaging Engineer (CPE): One-year online course for both fresh and working graduates at IIP Chennai.

== College life ==
Every year Institute celebrates 'Packfest' in Mumbai campus students from all campuses comes and participates in recreational activities. The institute assists 100 percent placement annually in Indian companies as well as companies abroad.

== INDIASTAR and PACMACHINE awards ==
The IIP confers INDIASTAR and PACMACHINE national awards for recognizing excellence in packaging. Winners are selected from nominated entries. The INDIASTAR Award was instituted in 1972 to promote and encourage excellence in packaging design, innovation and sustainability once every two years. The PACMACHINE Award was introduced in 1992 to recognize the achievements and promote the efforts of the packaging machinery sector.

== See also ==
- Ministry of Commerce and Industry (India)
- Packaging engineering
- Higher education in India
- IIT Roorkee
