= Bezawada Gopala Reddy =

Indian politician

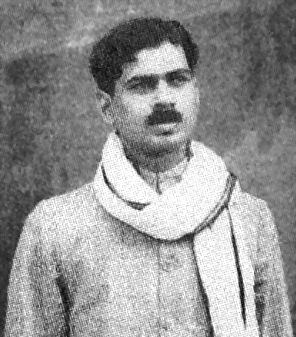
- Reddy in 1944

6th Governor of Uttar Pradesh
- In office 1 May 1967 – 30 June 1972
- Chief Minister: Charan Singh; Chandra Bhanu Gupta; Tribhuvan Narain Singh; Kamalapati Tripathi
- Preceded by: Bishwanath Das
- Succeeded by: Shashi Kant Varma (Acting)

4th Union Minister of Information and Broadcasting
- In office 10 April 1962 – 31 August 1963
- Prime Minister: Jawaharlal Nehru
- Preceded by: B. V. Keskar
- Succeeded by: Satya Narayan Sinha

Member of Parliament, Lok Sabha
- In office 1962–1967
- Preceded by: Constituency established
- Succeeded by: R. D. Reddy
- Constituency: Kavali

4th Union Minister of State for Revenue and Civil Expenditure
- In office 10 May 1958 – 7 April 1961
- Prime Minister: Jawaharlal Nehru
- Minister: Morarji Desai
- Preceded by: Manilal Chaturbhai Shah
- Succeeded by: Bali Ram Bhagat

Member of Parliament, Rajya Sabha
- In office 18 August 1958 – 27 February 1962
- Preceded by: TJM Wilson
- Succeeded by: N. Narotham Reddy
- Constituency: Andhra Pradesh

2nd Chief Minister of Andhra State
- In office 28 March 1955 – 1 November 1956
- Governor: Chandulal Madhavlal Trivedi
- Deputy: Neelam Sanjiva Reddy
- Preceded by: Tanguturi Prakasam
- Succeeded by: Office dissolved (Neelam Sanjiva Reddy as Chief Minister of United Andhra Pradesh)

Member of Andhra Pradesh Legislative Assembly
- In office 1955–1958
- Preceded by: Ganga Chinna Kondaiah
- Succeeded by: Anam Sanjeeva Reddy
- Constituency: Atmakur

2nd President of Andhra Pradesh Congress Committee
- In office 1955–1956
- AICC President: U. N. Dhebar
- Preceded by: Neelam Sanjiva Reddy
- Succeeded by: Damodaram Sanjivayya

Personal details
- Born: Bezawada Gopala Reddy; 5 August 1907 Buchireddypalem, Madras Presidency, British India (now in Andhra Pradesh, India)
- Died: 9 March 1997 (aged 89) Chennai, Tamil Nadu, India
- Party: Indian National Congress
- Spouse: Lakshmikanthamma
- Relatives: Bezawada Ramachandra Reddy

Bezawada Gopala Reddy (5 August 1907 – 9 March 1997) was an Indian freedom fighter, writer and politician. He was the second and last Chief Minister of the erstwhile Indian state, Andhra State from 1955 to 1956 and later served as the Governor of Uttar Pradesh from 1967 to 1972. He was popularly known as "Andhra Tagore" in recognition of his literary works.

== Early and personal life ==
Reddy was born on 5 August 1907 in Buchireddypalem in the Nellore district of present-day Andhra Pradesh (then part of Madras Presidency) to Pattabhiram Reddy and Seethamma. He completed his school education in the same village before furthering his studies at Andhra Jatiya Kalashala from 1921 to 1924 in Machilipatnam. Reddy pursued graduation in D.Litt at Visva-Bharati University in Shantiniketan, West Bengal. Upon his return from West Bengal in 1927, he actively participated in the freedom movement, notably contributing to the Salt March and Quit India Movement. As a consequence of his involvement, he faced arrest and imprisonment at Vellore and Tanjavore jails.

Reddy was married to Lakshmikanthamma, the daughter of the freedom fighter Tikkavarapu Rami Reddy and Sudarshanamma. She was also a student at Shantiniketan and involved in the freedom movement. Reddy's admiration for Rabindranath Tagore's works inspired him to translate many of his books into the Telugu language.

== Political career ==
Member A.I.C.C., since 1931; M.L.A., Madras, 1937–46; was Minister Local Administration, Government of Madras, 1937–39; President Andhra Pradesh, 1955–56; Finance Minister, Madras, 1947; Home Minister, Andhra Pradesh, 1956; Finance Minister, Andhra Pradesh, 1957; M.P. Rajya Sabha, 1958–60, Lok Sabha, 1962; Minister of Revenue and Civil Expenditure Government of India, 1958–61; Minister for Information and Broadcasting 1962–63; resigned under the Kamraj Plan; Chairman, Children's Film Society; President: Dakshin Bharat Hindi Prachar Sabha (A.P.); Telugu Bhasha Samiti, since 1947; A.P. Sahitya Academy, since 1957; All-India Chess Federation, since 1959; Governor of U.P. since 1 May 1967.

== Death and legacy ==
Reddy was admitted to the hospital following an accident just 10 days prior to his death. He died on 9 May 1997 at the age of 89, after being discharged from the hospital at his son's residence. An award in his honor was established and is known as the "Dr. Bezawada Gopala Reddy Award", recognising individuals in the fields of Telugu literature and politics for their contributions.

== Awards ==
Reddy received the prestigious Raja-Lakshmi Award for the year 1989, conferred upon him by the Sri Raja-Lakshmi Foundation, Chennai.

== See also ==
- List of chief ministers of Andhra Pradesh

== Sources ==
- Rulers
- "'Sahithi Brindavana Sanchary' Dr. Bejawada Gopala Reddy" from C. P. Brown Academy
