= Minister of Defence (India) =

Minister of Defence in India

- Rakṣhā Mantrī
- Emblem of the Ministry of Defence

- Flag of the Ministry of Defence

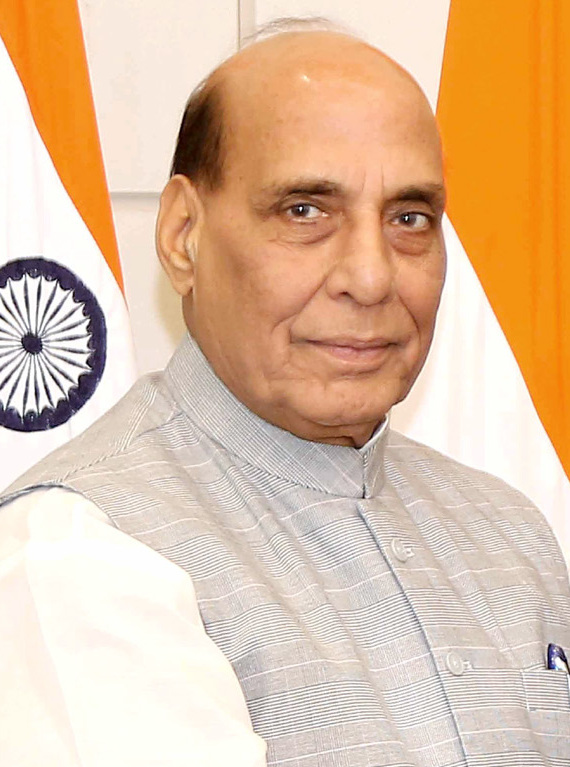
- Incumbent; Rajnath Singh since 30 May 2019
- Style: The Honourable
- Member of: Union Council of Ministers
- Reports to: President of India; Prime Minister of India; Parliament of India
- Residence: 17, Akbar Road, New Delhi
- Seat: Room No. 104, South Block, New Delhi
- Appointer: President of India; on the advice of the Prime Minister
- Term length: 5 years
- Constituting instrument: Constitution of India
- Formation: 15 August 1947
- First holder: Baldev Singh
- Deputy: Sanjay Seth, MoS
- Salary: ₹124,000 (US$1,300) monthly (Note: Minister of Defence gets the same salary as a Member of Parliament in India. In addition to the basic pay, there is a constituency allowance of ₹87,000, office allowance of ₹75,000 per month, and other emoluments.)
- Website: mod.gov.in

The Minister of Defence or the Defence Minister (ISO: Rakṣhā Mantrī), is the head of the Ministry of Defence and a high-ranking minister in the Union Council of Ministers of the Government of India. The defence minister additionally serves as president of the Institute for Defence Studies and Analyses, and as the chancellor of the Defence Institute of Advanced Technology and the National Defence University. The minister is usually a member of the Cabinet Committee on Security, and the National Security Council. The defence minister is assisted by a minister of state and, less commonly by a deputy minister.

The first defence minister of independent India was Baldev Singh of the Indian National Congress, who served in the First Nehru ministry from 1947 to 1952. A. K. Antony of the Congress has had the longest tenure, serving for seven years and 212 days from 26 October 2006 till 26 May 2014. Rajnath Singh of the Bharatiya Janata Party is the incumbent defence minister, serving since 30 May 2019.

== Cabinet Ministers ==
No.	Portrait	Name (born–died) Constituency	Term of office			Political party	Ministry	Prime Minister
No.	Portrait	Name (born–died) Constituency	Took office	Left office	Time in office	Political party	Ministry	Prime Minister
1		Baldev Singh (1902–1961); MP for Punjab (Constituent Assembly)	15 August 1947	13 May 1952	4 years, 272 days	Indian National Congress	Nehru I	Jawaharlal Nehru
2		N. Gopalaswami Ayyangar (1882–1953); Rajya Sabha MP for Madras	13 May 1952	10 February 1953 (died in office)	273 days	Indian National Congress	Nehru II	Jawaharlal Nehru
3		Jawaharlal Nehru (1889–1964); MP for Phulpur (Prime Minister)	10 February 1953	10 January 1955	1 year, 334 days	Indian National Congress	Nehru II	Jawaharlal Nehru
4		Kailash Nath Katju (1887–1968); MP for Mandsaur	10 January 1955	30 January 1957	2 years, 20 days	Indian National Congress	Nehru II	Jawaharlal Nehru
(3)		Jawaharlal Nehru (1889–1964); MP for Phulpur (Prime Minister)	30 January 1957	17 April 1957	77 days	Indian National Congress	Nehru II	Jawaharlal Nehru
5		V. K. Krishna Menon (1896–1974); MP for Bombay North	17 April 1957	2 April 1962	5 years, 197 days	Indian National Congress	Nehru III	Jawaharlal Nehru
5		V. K. Krishna Menon (1896–1974); MP for Bombay North	2 April 1962	31 October 1962	5 years, 197 days	Indian National Congress	Nehru IV	Jawaharlal Nehru
(3)		Jawaharlal Nehru (1889–1964); MP for Phulpur (Prime Minister)	31 October 1962	14 November 1962	14 days	Indian National Congress	Nehru IV	Jawaharlal Nehru
6		Yashwantrao Chavan (1913–1984); MP for Nashik	14 November 1962	27 May 1964	3 years, 364 days	Indian National Congress	Nehru IV	Jawaharlal Nehru
6		Yashwantrao Chavan (1913–1984); MP for Nashik	27 May 1964	9 June 1964	3 years, 364 days	Indian National Congress	Nanda I	Gulzarilal Nanda
6		Yashwantrao Chavan (1913–1984); MP for Nashik	9 June 1964	11 January 1966	3 years, 364 days	Indian National Congress	Shastri	Lal Bahadur Shastri
6		Yashwantrao Chavan (1913–1984); MP for Nashik	11 January 1966	24 January 1966	3 years, 364 days	Indian National Congress	Nanda II	Gulzarilal Nanda
6		Yashwantrao Chavan (1913–1984); MP for Nashik	24 January 1966	13 November 1966	3 years, 364 days	Indian National Congress	Indira I	Indira Gandhi
7		Swaran Singh (1907–1994); MP for Jullundur	13 November 1966	13 March 1967	3 years, 226 days	Indian National Congress	Indira I	Indira Gandhi
7		Swaran Singh (1907–1994); MP for Jullundur	13 March 1967	27 June 1970	3 years, 226 days	Indian National Congress	Indira II	Indira Gandhi
8		Jagjivan Ram (1908–1986); MP for Sasaram	27 June 1970	18 March 1971	4 years, 105 days	Indian National Congress (R)	Indira II	Indira Gandhi
8		Jagjivan Ram (1908–1986); MP for Sasaram	18 March 1971	10 October 1974	4 years, 105 days	Indian National Congress (R)	Indira III	Indira Gandhi
(7)		Swaran Singh (1907–1994); MP for Jullundur	10 October 1974	1 December 1975	1 year, 52 days	Indian National Congress (R)	Indira III	Indira Gandhi
9		Indira Gandhi (1917–1984); MP for Rae Bareli (Prime Minister)	1 December 1975	20 December 1975	19 days	Indian National Congress (R)	Indira III	Indira Gandhi
10		Bansi Lal (1927–2006); Rajya Sabha MP for Punjab	21 December 1975	24 March 1977	1 year, 93 days	Indian National Congress (R)	Indira III	Indira Gandhi
(8)		Jagjivan Ram (1908–1986); MP for Sasaram (Deputy Prime Minister from 24 January 1979)	24 March 1977	28 July 1979	2 years, 126 days	Janata Party	Desai	Morarji Desai
11		Chidambaram Subramaniam (1910–2000); MP for Palani	28 July 1979	14 January 1980	170 days	Indian National Congress (Urs)	Charan	Charan Singh
(9)		Indira Gandhi (1917–1984); MP for Medak (Prime Minister)	14 January 1980	15 January 1982	2 years, 1 day	Indian National Congress (I)	Indira IV	Indira Gandhi
12		Ramaswamy Venkataraman (1910–2009); MP for Chennai South	15 January 1982	2 August 1984	2 years, 200 days	Indian National Congress (I)	Indira IV	Indira Gandhi
13		Shankarrao Chavan (1920–2004); MP for Nanded	2 August 1984	31 October 1984	151 days	Indian National Congress (I)	Indira IV	Indira Gandhi
13		Shankarrao Chavan (1920–2004); MP for Nanded	31 October 1984	31 December 1984	151 days	Indian National Congress (I)	Rajiv I	Rajiv Gandhi
14		P. V. Narasimha Rao (1921–2004); MP for Ramtek	31 December 1984	25 September 1985	268 days	Indian National Congress (I)	Rajiv II	Rajiv Gandhi
15		Rajiv Gandhi (1944–1991); MP for Amethi (Prime Minister)	25 September 1985	24 January 1987	1 year, 121 days	Indian National Congress (I)	Rajiv II	Rajiv Gandhi
16		V. P. Singh (1931–2008); Rajya Sabha MP for Uttar Pradesh	24 January 1987	12 April 1987	78 days	Indian National Congress (I)	Rajiv II	Rajiv Gandhi
17		K. C. Pant (1931–2012); MP for New Delhi	12 April 1987	2 December 1989	2 years, 234 days	Indian National Congress (I)	Rajiv II	Rajiv Gandhi
(16)		Vishwanath Pratap Singh (1931–2008); MP for Fatehpur (Prime Minister)	2 December 1989	10 November 1990	343 days	Janata Dal	Vishwanath	Vishwanath Pratap Singh
18		Chandra Shekhar (1927–2007); MP for Ballia (Prime Minister)	10 November 1990	21 June 1991	223 days	Samajwadi Janata Party (Rashtriya)	Chandra Shekhar	Chandra Shekhar
(14)		P. V. Narasimha Rao (1921–2004); Unelected (Prime Minister)	21 June 1991	26 June 1991	5 days	Indian National Congress (I)	Rao	P. V. Narasimha Rao
19		Sharad Pawar (born 1940); MP for Baramati	26 June 1991	6 March 1993	1 year, 253 days	Indian National Congress (I)	Rao	P. V. Narasimha Rao
(14)		P. V. Narasimha Rao (1921–2004); MP for Nandyal (Prime Minister)	6 March 1993	16 May 1996	3 years, 71 days	Indian National Congress (I)	Rao	P. V. Narasimha Rao
20		Pramod Mahajan (1949–2006); MP for Mumbai North East	16 May 1996	1 June 1996	16 days	Bharatiya Janata Party	Vajpayee I	Atal Bihari Vajpayee
21		Mulayam Singh Yadav (1939–2022); MP for Mainpuri	1 June 1996	21 April 1997	1 year, 290 days	Samajwadi Party	Deve Gowda	H. D. Deve Gowda
21		Mulayam Singh Yadav (1939–2022); MP for Mainpuri	21 April 1997	18 March 1998	1 year, 290 days	Samajwadi Party	Gujral	Inder Kumar Gujral
22		George Fernandes (1930–2019); MP for Nalanda	19 March 1998	13 October 1999	2 years, 101 days	Samata Party	Vajpayee II	Atal Bihari Vajpayee
22		George Fernandes (1930–2019); MP for Nalanda	13 October 1999	16 March 2001	2 years, 101 days	Samata Party	Vajpayee III	Atal Bihari Vajpayee
23		Jaswant Singh (1938–2020); Rajya Sabha MP for Rajasthan	16 March 2001	21 October 2001	219 days	Bharatiya Janata Party	Vajpayee III	Atal Bihari Vajpayee
(22)		George Fernandes (1930–2019); MP for Nalanda	21 October 2001	22 May 2004	2 years, 214 days	Janata Dal (United)	Vajpayee III	Atal Bihari Vajpayee
24		Pranab Mukherjee (1935–2020); MP for Jangipur	23 May 2004	26 October 2006	2 years, 156 days	Indian National Congress	Manmohan I	Manmohan Singh
25		A. K. Antony (born 1940); Rajya Sabha MP for Kerala	26 October 2006	22 May 2009	7 years, 212 days	Indian National Congress	Manmohan I	Manmohan Singh
25		A. K. Antony (born 1940); Rajya Sabha MP for Kerala	23 May 2009	26 May 2014	7 years, 212 days	Indian National Congress	Manmohan II	Manmohan Singh
26		Arun Jaitley (1952–2019); Rajya Sabha MP for Gujarat	26 May 2014	9 November 2014	166 days	Bharatiya Janata Party	Modi I	Narendra Modi
27		Manohar Parrikar (1955–2019); Rajya Sabha MP for Uttar Pradesh	9 November 2014	13 March 2017	2 years, 124 days	Bharatiya Janata Party	Modi I	Narendra Modi
(26)		Arun Jaitley (1952–2019); Rajya Sabha MP for Gujarat	13 March 2017	3 September 2017	174 days	Bharatiya Janata Party	Modi I	Narendra Modi
28		Nirmala Sitharaman (born 1959); Rajya Sabha MP for Karnataka	3 September 2017	30 May 2019	1 year, 269 days	Bharatiya Janata Party	Modi I	Narendra Modi
29		Rajnath Singh (born 1951); MP for Lucknow	30 May 2019	9 June 2024	7 years, 170 days	Bharatiya Janata Party	Modi II	Narendra Modi
29		Rajnath Singh (born 1951); MP for Lucknow	9 June 2024	Incumbent	7 years, 170 days	Bharatiya Janata Party	Modi III	Narendra Modi

== Ministers of State ==
No.	Portrait	Minister (Birth-Death) Constituency	Term of office			Political party	Ministry	Prime Minister
No.	Portrait	Minister (Birth-Death) Constituency	From	To	Period	Political party	Ministry	Prime Minister
1		Mahavir Tyagi (1899–1980); MP for Dehradun; Minister of Defence Organisation	16 March 1953	17 April 1957	4 years, 32 days	Indian National Congress	Nehru II	Jawaharlal Nehru
2		Kotha Raghuramaiah (1912–1979); MP for Guntur; Minister of Defence Production, since 14 November 1962	16 April 1962	27 May 1964	2 years, 54 days	Indian National Congress	Nehru IV	Jawaharlal Nehru
2		Kotha Raghuramaiah (1912–1979); MP for Guntur; Minister of Defence Production, since 14 November 1962	27 May 1964	9 June 1964	2 years, 54 days	Indian National Congress	Nanda I	Gulzarilal Nanda
3		Alungal Mathai Thomas (1912–1981); MP for Ernakulam (Defence Production)	13 June 1964	11 January 1966	1 year, 212 days	Indian National Congress	Shastri	Lal Bahadur Shastri
4		Jaisukhlal Hathi (1909–1982); Rajya Sabha MP for Gujarat	29 October 1965	11 January 1966	74 days	Indian National Congress	Shastri	Lal Bahadur Shastri
(3)		Alungal Mathai Thomas (1912–1981); MP for Ernakulam (Defence Production)	11 January 1966	24 January 1966	13 days	Indian National Congress	Nanda II	Gulzarilal Nanda
(4)		Jaisukhlal Hathi (1909–1982); Rajya Sabha MP for Gujarat	11 January 1966	24 January 1966	13 days	Indian National Congress	Nanda II	Gulzarilal Nanda
(3)		Alungal Mathai Thomas (1912–1981); MP for Ernakulam (Defence Production since 31 January 1966)	24 January 1966	13 March 1967	1 year, 48 days	Indian National Congress	Indira I	Indira Gandhi
(4)		Jaisukhlal Hathi (1909–1982); Rajya Sabha MP for Gujarat; Minister of Defence Supplies, until 13 November 1966	24 January 1966	13 March 1967	1 year, 48 days	Indian National Congress	Indira I	Indira Gandhi
5		Bali Ram Bhagat (1922–2011); MP for Arrah	13 March 1967	14 November 1967	246 days	Indian National Congress	Indira II	Indira Gandhi
6		Lalit Narayan Mishra (1923–1975); Rajya Sabha MP for Bihar (Defence Production)	14 November 1967	27 June 1970	2 years, 225 days	Indian National Congress	Indira II	Indira Gandhi
7		Narendrasinghji Mahida; MP for Anand	27 June 1970	18 March 1971	264 days	Indian National Congress (R)	Indira II	Indira Gandhi
8		Prakash Chandra Sethi (1919–1996); MP for Indore (Defence Production)	27 June 1970	18 March 1971	309 days	Indian National Congress (R)	Indira II	Indira Gandhi
8		Prakash Chandra Sethi (1919–1996); MP for Indore (Defence Production)	18 March 1971	2 May 1971	309 days	Indian National Congress (R)	Indira III	Indira Gandhi
9		Vidya Charan Shukla (1929–2013); MP for Raipur (Defence Production)	2 May 1971	10 October 1974	3 years, 161 days	Indian National Congress (R)	Indira III	Indira Gandhi
10		Ram Niwas Mirdha (1924–2010); Rajya Sabha MP for Rajasthan (Defence Production)	10 October 1974	21 December 1975	1 year, 72 days	Indian National Congress (R)	Indira III	Indira Gandhi
11		Vitthalrao Gadgil (1928–2001); MP for Pune (Defence Production)	25 December 1975	24 March 1977	1 year, 89 days	Indian National Congress (R)	Indira III	Indira Gandhi
12		Janaki Ballabh Patnaik (1927–2015); MP for Cuttack	23 December 1976	24 March 1977	91 days	Indian National Congress (R)	Indira III	Indira Gandhi
13		Sher Singh Kadyan (1917–2009); MP for Rohtak	14 August 1977	28 July 1979	1 year, 348 days	Janata Party	Desai	Morarji Desai
14		Jagbir Singh; Rajya Sabha MP for Uttar Pradesh	30 July 1979	14 January 1980	168 days	Janata Party (Secular)	Charan	Charan Singh
15		C. P. N. Singh; MP for Padrauna	3 March 1980	19 October 1980	230 days	Indian National Congress (I)	Indira IV	Indira Gandhi
16		Shivraj Patil (born 1935); MP for Latur	19 October 1980	15 January 1982	1 year, 88 days	Indian National Congress (I)	Indira IV	Indira Gandhi
17		Brigadier; Kamakhya Prasad Singh Deo AVSM (born 1941); MP for Dhenkanal	29 January 1983	31 October 1984	1 year, 332 days	Indian National Congress (I)	Indira IV	Indira Gandhi
17		Brigadier; Kamakhya Prasad Singh Deo AVSM (born 1941); MP for Dhenkanal	4 November 1984	31 December 1984	1 year, 332 days	Indian National Congress (I)	Rajiv I	Rajiv Gandhi
18		Sukh Ram (1927–2022); MP for Mandi (Defence Production and Defence Supplies)	25 September 1985	22 October 1986	1 year, 27 days	Indian National Congress (I)	Rajiv II	Rajiv Gandhi
19		Arun Singh (born 1944); Rajya Sabha MP for Uttar Pradesh (Defence Research and Development Organisation)	25 September 1985	18 July 1987	1 year, 296 days	Indian National Congress (I)	Rajiv II	Rajiv Gandhi
(16)		Shivraj Patil (born 1935); MP for Latur	22 October 1986	25 June 1988	1 year, 247 days	Indian National Congress (I)	Rajiv II	Rajiv Gandhi
20		Chintamani Panigrahi (1922–2000); MP for Bhubaneswar (Defence Production and Defence Supplies)	25 June 1988	4 July 1989	1 year, 9 days	Indian National Congress (I)	Rajiv II	Rajiv Gandhi
21		Dumar Lal Baitha (1924–1997); MP for Araria (Defence Production and Supplies)	4 July 1989	2 December 1989	151 days		Rajiv II	Rajiv Gandhi
22		Raja Ramanna (1925–2004); Unelected	20 January 1990	10 November 1990	294 days	Janata Dal	Vishwanath	Vishwanath Pratap Singh
23		Lalit Vijay Singh (1931–1998); MP for Begusarai	21 November 1990	21 June 1991	212 days	Samajwadi Janata Party (Rashtriya)	Chandra Shekhar	Chandra Shekhar
24		S. Krishna Kumar (born 1939); MP for Quilon	26 June 1991	18 January 1993	1 year, 206 days	Indian National Congress (I)	Rao	P. V. Narasimha Rao
25		Mallikarjun Goud (1941–2002); MP for Mahabubnagar	18 January 1993	19 January 1995	2 years, 1 day	Indian National Congress (I)	Rao	P. V. Narasimha Rao
26		Suresh Pachouri (born 1952); Rajya Sabha MP for Madhya Pradesh (Defence Production and Supplies)	15 September 1995	16 May 1996	244 days	Indian National Congress (I)	Rao	P. V. Narasimha Rao
27		Mallikarjun Goud (1941–2002); MP for Mahabubnagar (Defence, Defence Research and Development)	30 September 1995	16 May 1996	229 days	Indian National Congress (I)	Rao	P. V. Narasimha Rao
28		N. V. N. Somu (1937–1997); MP for Chennai North	6 July 1996	21 April 1997	296 days	Dravida Munnetra Kazhagam	Deve Gowda	H. D. Deve Gowda
28		N. V. N. Somu (1937–1997); MP for Chennai North	21 April 1997	14 November 1997 (died in office)	296 days	Dravida Munnetra Kazhagam	Gujral	Inder Kumar Gujral
29		Harin Pathak (born 1947); MP for Ahmedabad East	13 October 1999	14 November 2000	1 year, 32 days	Bharatiya Janata Party	Vajpayee III	Atal Bihari Vajpayee
30		Bachi Singh Rawat (1949–2021); MP for Almora	13 October 1999	22 November 1999	40 days	Bharatiya Janata Party	Vajpayee III	Atal Bihari Vajpayee
31		Krishnam Raju (1940–2022); MP for Narasapuram	22 July 2001	1 July 2002	344 days	Bharatiya Janata Party	Vajpayee III	Atal Bihari Vajpayee
(29)		Harin Pathak (born 1947); MP for Ahmedabad East (Defence Production and Supplies)	15 October 2001	29 January 2003	1 year, 106 days	Bharatiya Janata Party	Vajpayee III	Atal Bihari Vajpayee
32		Chaman Lal Gupta (1934–2021); MP for Udhampur	1 July 2002	22 May 2004	1 year, 326 days	Bharatiya Janata Party	Vajpayee III	Atal Bihari Vajpayee
33		O. Rajagopal (born 1929); Rajya Sabha MP for Madhya Pradesh	29 January 2003	22 May 2004	114 days	Bharatiya Janata Party	Vajpayee III	Atal Bihari Vajpayee
34		Bijoy Krishna Handique (1934–2015); MP for Jorhat	23 May 2004	29 January 2006	1 year, 251 days	Indian National Congress	Manmohan I	Manmohan Singh
35		Rao Inderjit Singh (born 1951); MP for Mahendragarh	29 January 2006	22 May 2009	3 years, 113 days	Indian National Congress	Manmohan I	Manmohan Singh
36		M. M. Pallam Raju (born 1962); MP for Kakinada (Defence Production, until 28 May 2009)	29 January 2006	22 May 2009	6 years, 273 days	Indian National Congress	Manmohan I	Manmohan Singh
36		M. M. Pallam Raju (born 1962); MP for Kakinada (Defence Production, until 28 May 2009)	28 May 2009	28 October 2012	6 years, 273 days	Indian National Congress	Manmohan II	Manmohan Singh
37		Jitin Prasada (born 1973); MP for Dhaurahra	28 October 2012	29 October 2012	1 day	Indian National Congress	Manmohan II	Manmohan Singh
38		Lalchand Kataria (born 1968); MP for Jaipur Rural	28 October 2012	31 October 2012	3 days	Indian National Congress	Manmohan II	Manmohan Singh
39		Jitendra Singh (born 1971); MP for Alwar	28 October 2012	26 May 2014	1 year, 180 days	Indian National Congress	Manmohan II	Manmohan Singh
(35)		Rao Inderjit Singh (born 1951); MP for Gurgaon	27 May 2014	5 July 2016	2 years, 39 days	Bharatiya Janata Party	Modi I	Narendra Modi
40		Subhash Bhamre (born 1953); MP for Dhule	5 July 2016	30 May 2019	2 years, 329 days	Bharatiya Janata Party	Modi I	Narendra Modi
41		Shripad Yesso Naik (born 1952); MP for North Goa	31 May 2019	7 July 2021	2 years, 37 days	Bharatiya Janata Party	Modi II	Narendra Modi
42		Ajay Bhatt (born 1961); MP for Nainital–Udhamsingh Nagar	7 July 2021	9 June 2024	2 years, 338 days	Bharatiya Janata Party	Modi II	Narendra Modi
43		Sanjay Seth (born 1959); MP for Ranchi	9 June 2024	Incumbent	2 years, 160 days	Bharatiya Janata Party	Modi III	Narendra Modi

== Deputy Ministers ==
No.	Portrait	Minister (Birth-Death) Constituency	Term of office			Political party	Ministry	Prime Minister
No.	Portrait	Minister (Birth-Death) Constituency	From	To	Period	Political party	Ministry	Prime Minister
1		Major-General; Kumar Shri Himmatsinhji CIE (1897–1973)	14 August 1950	29 February 1952	1 year, 199 days	Indian National Congress	Nehru I	Jawaharlal Nehru
2		Wing Commander; Surjit Singh Majithia (1912–1995); MP for Tarn Taran	12 August 1952	17 April 1957	4 years, 248 days	Indian National Congress	Nehru II	Jawaharlal Nehru
3		Satish Chandra (1917–1990); MP for Bareilly (Defence Production, from 14 July 1955)	27 November 1952	17 April 1957	4 years, 141 days	Indian National Congress	Nehru II	Jawaharlal Nehru
(2)		Wing Commander; Surjit Singh Majithia (1912–1995); MP for Tarn Taran	17 April 1957	10 April 1962	4 years, 358 days	Indian National Congress	Nehru III	Jawaharlal Nehru
4		Kotha Raghuramaiah (1912–1979); MP for Guntur	21 May 1957	10 April 1962	4 years, 324 days	Indian National Congress	Nehru III	Jawaharlal Nehru
5		Dajisaheb Chavan (1916–1973); MP for Karad	8 May 1962	27 May 1964	2 years, 32 days	Indian National Congress	Nehru IV	Jawaharlal Nehru
5		Dajisaheb Chavan (1916–1973); MP for Karad	27 May 1964	9 June 1964	2 years, 32 days	Indian National Congress	Nanda I	Gulzarilal Nanda
6		Colonel; Datla Satyanarayana Raju; MP for Rajahmundry	15 June 1964	24 January 1966	1 year, 223 days	Indian National Congress	Shastri	Lal Bahadur Shastri
7		Shyam Dhar Mishra (1919–2001); MP for Mirzapur	24 January 1966	14 February 1966	21 days	Indian National Congress	Indira I	Indira Gandhi
8		M. R. Krishna; MP for Peddapalli	16 November 1967	27 June 1970	2 years, 223 days	Indian National Congress	Indira II	Indira Gandhi
9		Janaki Ballabh Patnaik (1927–2015); MP for Cuttack	5 February 1973	23 December 1976	3 years, 322 days	Indian National Congress (R)	Indira III	Indira Gandhi
10		Brigadier; Kamakhya Prasad Singh Deo AVSM (born 1941); MP for Dhenkanal	15 January 1982	29 January 1983	1 year, 14 days	Indian National Congress (I)	Indira IV	Indira Gandhi

== Length of tenure ==
List by tenure
No.	Defence Minister	Party	Longest continuous term	Total tenure
1	A K Antony	INC	7 years, 212 days	7 years, 212 days
2	Rajnath Singh	BJP	7 years, 171 days	7 years, 171 days
3	Jagjivan Ram	INC	4 years, 105 days	6 years, 231 days

== See also ==
- Ministry of Defence (India)
- Defence ministers
