= Ajit Prasad Jain =

Indian politician (1902–1977)

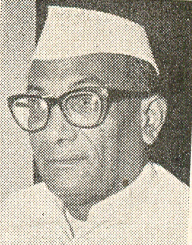

3rd Governor of Kerala
- In office 2 April 1965 – 6 February 1966
- Chief Minister: Office Vacant
- Preceded by: V. V. Giri
- Succeeded by: Bhagwan Sahay

5th Minister of Agriculture
- In office 25 November 1954 – 24 August 1959
- Prime Minister: Jawaharlal Nehru
- Preceded by: Rafi Ahmed Kidwai
- Succeeded by: S. K. Patil

Personal details
- Born: 6 October 1902 Saharanpur, United Provinces, British India (Now in Uttar Pradesh, India)
- Died: 2 January 1977 (aged 74)
- Party: Indian National Congress
- Education: University of Lucknow (LL.B.)

Ajit Prasad Jain (6 October 1902 – 2 January 1977) was an Indian politician who served as the President of the U. P. Congress Committee, member of the Constituent Assembly, Union minister and Governor of Kerala from Saharanpur, in the state of Uttar Pradesh, India.

== Early life ==
He was born in Meerut in 1902 in a middle-class family. He graduated with Honours at the Lucknow University and also took his LL.B. He started his legal practice in 1926. He was an alumnus of the SM College, Chandausi. Soon after A.P. Jain was drawn to politics and joined the Indian National Congress.

== Political career ==
He took part in the Civil Disobedience Movement (1930) and all later Congress movements. He soon became prominent in U.P. politics. He became a member of the U.P. Congress working committee and also the Secretary of Provincial Congress Committee. He was elected to the Constituent Assembly from the United Provinces. He was appointed a Parliamentary Secretary in the U.P. Government 1937 and remained in office till the resignation of the Ministry in 1939. He was a member of the All India Congress Committee for a long time. He was a minister with cabinet rank in charge of the Ministry of Rehabilitation under Nehru following the constitution of the First Lok Sabha in 1952.

He subsequently held the portfolio of Union Minister for Food and Agriculture in Mr. Nehru's cabinet from December 1954 to August 1959. He became President of the U.P. Congress Committee in May 1961. When Rafi Ahmed Kidwai formed the All India Kisan Mazdoor Praja Party owing to ideological differences with the then Congress president Purushottam Das Tandon, Jain handed in his resignation to Nehru in solidarity with Kidwai. Nehru however turned it down.

He succeeded V. V. Giri as the third governor of Kerala serving from 2 April 1965 to 6 February 1966 during which time the state remained under President's rule. He resigned from the post of Governor to canvass support for Mrs. Indira Gandhi for position of Prime Minister following the untimely death of Lal Bahadur Shastri. He belonged to the leftist section of the Congress and wanted to strengthen this section by opposing Morarji Desai.

Later he was elected to the Rajya Sabha in 1967 and remained a member till 1975.

He accepted the Chairmanship of the Irrigation Commission and the report of this commission remains a monumental work.

He was a member of the Zamidari Abolition Committee in UP and was instrumental in the drafting of Zamidari Abolition bill and in the plan to link the rivers of India. His far-sightedness in this project and in the establishment of green revolution led to the self-sufficiency of food in India.

He established Seva Nidhi Trust in Saharanpur & in Fatehpur in UP, India, which till date is running a house for destitutes, TB clinic & free eye camps. Additionally it gives out scholarships to poor and needy students. These establishments are being guided by his son Dr K P Jain, a renowned doctor in Delhi (Ex chairman Ganga Ram Hospital). Ajit Prasad Jain won the 1952 and 1957 Lok Sabha election as the Congress Party candidate from Saharanpur (Uttar Pradesh) and from Tumkur (Karnataka) where he won in 1962.

He chaired the Uttar Pradesh Police Commission, looking into police reforms in the state, from 1960 and it submitted its report in 1961. His Shadow of the bear: The Indo-Soviet treaty was published in 1971 and Kashmir: what really happened, based on his recollection of events that led to the arrest of Sheikh Abdullah in 1953, in 1972.

== Death ==
Ajit Prasad Jain died on 2 January 1977 at the age of 75.
