= D. P. Karmarkar =

Indian politician

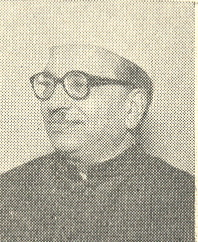

Member of Parliament for Dharwad North
- In office 17 April 1952 – 31 March 1962
- Preceded by: none
- Succeeded by: Sarojini Mahishi

Personal details
- Born: 20 July 1902 Mantur, Dharwad District, Bombay Presidency, British India (now in Karnataka, India)
- Died: 20 June 1991 (aged 88)
- Party: Indian National Congress
- Education: ILS Law College
- Occupation: Lawyer

Dattatraya Parashuram Karmarkar, known as D. P. Karmarkar (20 July 1902 – 20 June 1991) was an Indian politician and Union government minister.

== Life ==
Karmarkar was educated at Karnatak College Dharwar, Deccan College and the ILS Law College, from which he qualified as a lawyer. He served in the Central Legislative Assembly from 1945 to 1947, and became a member of the Provisional Parliament in 1951. In 1952, he was elected to the 1st Lok Sabha as a member of the Indian National Congress from the constituency of Dharwad North, holding this seat until the 1962 general election.

From August 1950 to May 1952, Karmarkar was a deputy commerce minister in the Union government, with the additional responsibilities of a deputy trade minister from May to August 1952. He was given cabinet rank in August 1952 and served as Commerce Minister until June 1956. He then served as Minister of State for Trade until April 1957, and was then appointed Minister of State (Health), serving in this role until the dissolution of the third Nehru ministry in April 1962. He was appointed to the Rajya Sabha on 3 April 1962 and served until 2 April 1968, during which time he was chairman of the House Committee from 1964 to 1966.

Lok Sabha
Preceded by none	Member of Parliament for Dharwad North; 1952 – 1957	Succeeded by Himself
Preceded by Himself	Member of Parliament for Dharwad North; 1957 – 1962	Succeeded by Sarojini Mahishi
