= B. V. Keskar =

Indian politician (1903–1984)

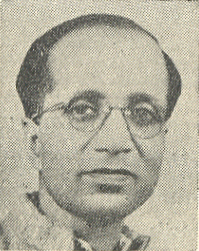

Union Minister of Information and Broadcasting
- In office 13 May 1952 – 9 April 1962
- Prime Minister: Jawaharlal Nehru
- Preceded by: R. R. Diwakar
- Succeeded by: Bezawada Gopala Reddy

Personal details
- Born: 1903
- Died: August 28, 1984 (aged 80–81)
- Party: Indian National Congress

Balakrishna Vishwanath Keskar (1903 – 28 August 1984) was an Indian politician and Union Minister for Information and Broadcasting between 1952 and 1962. Remembered for creating the Vrinda Vadya and promoting classical music through All India Radio, Keskar, who was India's longest serving Minister for Information and Broadcasting, was also responsible for banning Hindi film music, cricket commentaries and the harmonium on All India Radio.

== Early life and education ==
Born in Pune to Vishwanath Keskar in 1903, Keskar was educated at the Kashi Vidyapith and the Sorbonne from where he earned a D. Litt degree. Keskar worked as a lecturer at Benaras' Sanskrit Vidyapith and was trained in dhrupad by Hari Narayan Mukherji of Banaras.

== Early political career ==
Keskar joined the Indian National Congress during the Non-Cooperation Movement of 1921 and served as a Secretary in the Foreign Department of the All India Congress Committee during 1939–1940 and was a General Secretary of the party in 1946. Keskar also served as a member of the Constituent Assembly of India representing the United Provinces.

== Political career in independent India ==
After Independence, Keskar was appointed a Deputy Minister in the Ministry of External Affairs and in the Ministry of Railways and Transport between 1948 and 1952. In 1952, he was elected to Parliament from Sultanpur and was made Minister of Information and Broadcasting a post he held from 1952 to 1962. Keskar was twice elected to Parliament from Sultanpur and Musafirkhana.

== Minister for Information and Broadcasting ==
Keskar was the third person to head the Ministry of Information and Broadcasting in independent India and had a decade long tenure at the helm, making him the longest serving minister in that ministry. Keskar believed Indian music had degenerated under the Muslims and the British. He held that centuries of Muslim rule had divorced Indian music from Hindu civilization and caused its bifurcation through the emergence of Hindustani music. Keskar belonged to a generation of Maharashtrian Brahmins who sought to reassert Hindu cultural influence in classical music by purging Islamic influences which they believed had led to its eroticisation and drift from its spiritual core.

Keskar deemed film songs vulgar, cheap and Westernised. This led him to initially impose a 10 percent quota on airtime for film music and subsequently to ban the broadcasting of film music on All India Radio. Film music had a growing audience in India and Keskar's decision to ban it on All India Radio allowed Radio Ceylon to capitalise on the opportunity. Radio Ceylon, which had launched its Hindi Service in 1950, attained great popularity throughout India with its programs like the Binaca Geetmala, Purani Filmo Ke Geet and Aap Hi Ke Geet. It even set up a Radio Advertising Services in Bombay to rake in advertising revenue. Gradually, All India Radio began to lose listeners and revenue forcing it in 1957 to launch the Vividh Bharati service.

Keskar was also responsible for banning cricket commentaries and the harmonium on All India Radio. As General Secretary of the All India Congress Committee, Keskar had noted that cricket would not survive the British Raj, arguing that its popularity in India depended on an "atmosphere of British culture and language". Even though his statement had drawn much opposition, Keskar chose to ban cricket commentaries and was subsequently forced to repeal his decision and allow live cricket broadcasts.

Keskar has however been credited with providing the common man with access to classical music and musicians with patronage that had disappeared with the abolition of princely states after independence. It was under Keskar's initiative that the National Programme of Music, since broadcast over All India Radio on weekends, was begun in 1952. In 1954, the annual Akashvani Sangeet Sammelan was started by All India Radio that served as a platform for both established and emerging young artistes in Indian classical music.

Keskar was also responsible for the establishment of the Vadya Vrinda as a national orchestra and created a new genre of 'light music' by commissioning the sitarist Ravi Shankar to head the Vadya Vrinda and to provide a 'light' musical alternative to the classical musical broadcasts.

== Later life and death ==
Despite his decade long tenure, Keskar remained politically a lightweight and never enjoyed cabinet rank with the ministry being lowered in rank to that of a Minister of State during his second stint from 1957 to 1962. Keskar lost the General Elections of 1962 from Fatehpur and was defeated again, this time by the Socialist leader Ram Manohar Lohia, in the by-election from the Farrukhabad parliamentary constituency in 1963. Indira Gandhi is said to have told Roberto Rossellini that Keskar had managed to retain his post for so long only because there was an "acute shortage of ministerial talent" in newly independent India.

Keskar authored and edited several books including Indian Music: Problems and Prospects and India -The land and people and later headed the National Book Trust. Keskar died in Nagpur on 28 August 1984.
