= Directorate General of Health Services (India) =

Indian government advisory health body

Agency overview
- Formed: 15 August 1947
- Preceding agency: Director General, Indian Medical Service
- Jurisdiction: Republic of India
- Agency executive: Dr. Loveneesh Gopal Krishna (CHS), Director General of Health Services
- Parent agency: Ministry of Health and Family Welfare
- Website: dghs.mohfw.gov.in

The Directorate General of Health Services (Dte.GHS) is an attached organisation of the Indian Ministry of Health and Family Welfare (MoHFW). It is the apex technical advisory and regulatory body of healthcare. It functions as a repository of technical knowledge regarding public health, medical education and healthcare, and provides technical guidance to the ministry in these domains. Dte.GHS is headed by the Director General of Health Services (DGHS), a Secretary level (Apex Grade) officer of the Central Health Service (CHS). Dr. Loveneesh Gopal Krishna is the current Director General of Health Services.

The Dte.GHS manages the Central Government Hospitals and performs its role in public health through various subordinate organisations.

== History ==
Prior to independence, the officers of the Indian Medical Service (IMS) used to hold the post of Director General, Indian Medical Service. The Directorate General of Health Services (Dte.GHS) was established in 15 August 1947 and the Director General of Health Services (DGHS) replaced the Director General, Indian Medical Service and the Public Health Commissioner. The first DGHS was Jivraj Narayan Mehta and he also functioned as the Health Secretary to the Government of India. The Contributory Health Service Scheme (the predecessor of Central Government Health Scheme) for the healthcare of Central Government Employees was under the administrative control of Dte.GHS.

== List of DGHS of India ==
Name	CHS Sub-cadre	Start of Term	End of Term	Ref.
Sunita Sharma	Teaching (T)	28 April 2025	_	
Atul Goel	Teaching (T)		27 April 2025	
Sunil Kumar				
Rajiv Garg		1 January 2020		
Sanjay Tyagi	Teaching (T)	14 September 2019	31 December 2019	
A K Saxena	Non-Teaching (NT)	12 July 2019		
S Venkatesh		17 June 2018		
Promila Gupta		3 April 2018		
B D Athani		17 January 2018		
Jagdish Prasad		1 December 2011	2017	
R K Srivastava		1 November 2005	1 December 2011	
J. B. Shrivastav				
Puliyur Krishnaswamy Duraiswami		1960	1974	
C K Lakshmanan				
Rao Bahadur K C K E Raja		1 June 1948	17 September 1952	
Jivraj Narayan Mehta		15 August 1947	1948	

== Central Govt. hospitals and medical colleges ==
The DteGHS has the administrative control of the Central Government hospitals and medical colleges:

- Atal Bihari Vajpayee Institute of Medical Sciences and Dr Ram Manohar Lohia Hospital
- Lady Hardinge Medical College and associated hospitals
- Vardhaman Mahavir Medical College and Safdarjung Hospital
- Rural Health Training Centre, Najafgarh

== Nursing Colleges ==
- Rajkumari Amrit Kaur College of Nursing
- Lady Reading Health School

== Public health institutes and organisations ==
- All India Institute of Hygiene and Public Health
- All India Institute of Physical Medicine and Rehabilitation
- National Centre for Disease Control
- National Vector Borne Disease Control Programme
- Regional Office of Health and Family Welfare

=== Point of Entries (PoE) Health Units ===
(Airport Health Organisation, Port Health Organisation, Land Port Health Organisation)

Established under the provisions of International Health Regulations (IHR), 2005.

List of Point of Entries (PoE) Health Units
State/UT	APHO	PHO	LPHO
Andaman & Nicobar Islands	Port Blair	_	_
Andhra Pradesh	Visakhapatanam	Visakhapatanam	_
Assam	Guwahati	_	_
Bihar	Gaya	_	Jogbani
Bihar	Gaya	_	Raxaul
Chandigarh	Chandigarh	_	_
Delhi	Delhi	_	_
Goa	Goa	Marmagao	_
Goa	Mopa Goa	Marmagao	_
Gujarat	Ahmedabad	Kandla	_
Karnataka	Bangalore	Manglore	_
Karnataka	Mangalore	Manglore	_
Kerala	Calicut	Cochin	_
Kerala	Cochin	Cochin	_
Kerala	Kannur	Cochin	_
Kerala	Thiruvananthapuram	Cochin	_
Madhya Pradesh	Indore	_	_
Maharashtra	Mumbai	JNPT Sheva	_
Maharashtra	Navi Mumbai	JNPT Sheva	_
Maharashtra	Nagpur	Mumbai	_
Maharashtra	Pune	Mumbai	_
Meghalaya	_	_	Dawki
Odisha	Bhubaneswar	Paradip	_
Punjab	Amritsar	_	Amritsar
Rajasthan	Jaipur	_	_
Tamil Nadu	Chennai	Chennai	_
Tamil Nadu	Coimbatore	Chennai	_
Tamil Nadu	Madurai	Tuticorin	_
Tamil Nadu	Tiruchirappalli	Tuticorin	_
Telangana	Hyderabad	_	_
Tripura	_	_	Agartala
Uttar Pradesh	Lucknow		
Uttar Pradesh	Varanasi		
West Bengal	Kolkata	Kolkata	Petrapole

== Medical regulatory bodies ==
- Central Drugs Standard Control Organization (CDSCO)
- National Organ and Tissue Transplant Organisation (NOTTO)

== Serum and vaccine institutes ==
- Central Research Institute, Kasauli
- BCG Vaccine Laboratory, Guindy
- Institute of Serology, Kolkata

== Drug procurement organisations ==
- Medical Stores Organisation
- GMSD

== Leprosy and TB institutes ==
- Central Leprosy Teaching and Research Institute, Chengalpattu
- Regional Leprosy Training and Research Institute
  - Aska
  - Gouripur
  - Raipur
- TB Institute, Ghaziabad

== Central institutes ==
- Central Health Education Bureau: Started functioning in 1955.
- Central Institute of Psychiatry, Ranchi

== See also ==
- Central Health Service
- Ministry of Health and Family Welfare
