= Labour Welfare Organisation =

Indian government organisation

Labour Welfare Organisations (LWOs) are subordinate offices of the Ministry of Labour and Employment (MoL&E), Government of India. The organisation is headed by the Director General of Labour Welfare (Joint Secretary, MoL&E). This organisation implements welfare schemes for unorganised workers such as beedi-workers, non-coal mine-workers and cine-workers.

There are 18 LWO Regions, each headed by a Welfare Commissioner, an officer of the Central Labour Service (CLS).

== History ==
The welfare schemes administered by the Labour Welfare Organisations (LWO) are formulated based on provisions in the following acts of the parliament

- Mica Mines Labour Welfare Fund Act, 1946
- Limestone and Dolomite Mines Labour Welfare Fund Act, 1972
- Beedi Workers Welfare Fund Act, 1976
- Iron Ore, Manganese Ore and Crome Ore Mines Labour Welfare Fund Act, 1976
- Cine Workers Welfare Fund Act, 1981

Earlier these schemes were funded through collection of cess. But currently these cess are abolished and the schemes are funded by grants from the Government.

The Mica Mines Labour Welfare Fund Act, 1946 and the Limestone and Dolomite Mines Labour Welfare Fund Act, 1972 were repealed in 2018. The Beedi Workers Welfare Fund Act, 1976 and the Iron Ore, Manganese Ore and Crome Ore Mines Labour Welfare Fund Act, 1976 were repealed in 2019.

The Cine Workers Welfare Fund Act, 1981 is proposed to be repealed once the Code on Social Security, 2020 is implemented.

In 2024, the Parliamentary Standing Committee on Labour, Textiles and Skill Development recommended that the ceiling for reimbursement in health scheme should be considered for revision and the possibility of including more health conditions under the health scheme should be explored. The same committee in 2025, recommended that the income ceiling of ₹10,000 per month for eligibility to avail scholarships should be considered for revision as it has not been revised since 2003.

== Organogram ==
The organisational structure of the Labour Welfare Organisation (LWO) is as follows

Cabinet Minister (Labour & Employment)
Minister of State
Secretary (L&E)
Director General (Labour Welfare)
Deputy Director General
Welfare Commissioner
Medical Officer [Hospital] | Deputy Welfare Commissioner; Assistant Welfare Commissioner [Administrative Wing] | Medical Officer [Dispensary]

== LWO Regions ==
There are 18 Labour Welfare Organisations.

| Sl. No. | LWO | Region covered | Number of Hospitals | Number of Dispensaries |
|---|---|---|---|---|
| 1 | Ahmedabad | Gujarat | | 12 |
| 2 | Ajmer | Rajasthan | | 23 |
| 3 | Lucknow | Uttar Pradesh | 1 | 24 |
| 4 | Bangaluru | Karnataka | 2 | 28 |
| 5 | Bhubaneswar | Odisha | 1 | 24 |
| 6 | Chandigarh | Punjab, Delhi, Chandigarh, Haryana | | |
| 7 | Chennai | Tamil Nadu, Puducherry | | 22 |
| 8 | Dehradun | Uttarakhand, Himachal Pradesh | | 1 |
| 9 | Guwahati | Assam, Meghalaya, Nagaland, Tripura, Arunachal Pradesh, Manipur, Mizoram | | 2 |
| 10 | Hyderabad | Andhra Pradesh, Telangana | 1 | 25 |
| 11 | Jabalpur | Madhya Pradesh | 2 | 36 |
| 12 | Thiruvananthapuram | Kerala, Lakshadweep | | 7 |
| 13 | Kolkata | West Bengal, Andaman and Nicobar islands,Sikkim | 1 | 23 |
| 14 | Nagpur | Maharashtra, Goa, Dadra and Nagar Haveli and Daman and Diu | | 18 |
| 15 | Patna | Bihar | 1 | 17 |
| 16 | Ranchi | Jharkhand | 1 | 7 |
| 17 | Raipur | Chhattisgarh | | 10 |
| 18 | Srinagar | Jammu and Kashmir | | |
| Total | | | 10 | 279 |

== LWO Hospitals and Dispensaries ==
There are a total of 10 Hospitals and 279 Dispensaries under Labour Welfare Organisations located throughout India. These medical institutions are headed by Officers of the Central Health Service (CHS).

LIST OF LWO HOSPITALS
| Sl. No. | Name of Hospital | Region | Bed Strength |
|---|---|---|---|
| 1 | Central Hospital, Barajamda | Ranchi | 50 |
| 2 | Central Hospital, Joda | Bhubaneswar | 50 |
| 3 | Central Hospital, Balaghat | Jabalpur | 50 |
| 4 | Central Hospital, Mysore | Bangalore | 50 |
| 5 | Central Hospital, Gursahaiganj | Lucknow | 10 |
| 6 | Central Hospital, Dhuliyan | Kolkata | 65 |
| 7 | Central Hospital, Sagar | Jabalpur | 30 |
| 8 | Central Hospital, Mukkudal | Hyderabad | 30 |
| 9 | Central Hospital, Bihar Sharif | Patna | 30 |
| 10 | Central Hospital, Yadgir | Bangalore | 15 |

=== Types of Dispensaries (Modern Medicine/Ayurvedic) ===
- Beedi Workers Welfare Fund (BWWF) Dispensary
- Cine Workers Welfare Fund (CWWF) Dispensary
- Limestone & Dolomite Mine Workers Welfare Fund (LSDMWWF) Dispensary
- Iron Ore, Manganese Ore & Chrome Ore Mine Workers Welfare Fund (IOMCWWF) Dispensary

These Dispensaries could be static or mobile (delivering services at the place of work).

== Welfare Schemes ==
=== Health Scheme ===
The beneficiaries receive primary healthcare and medicines free of cost from the Dispensaries and Hospitals under Labour Welfare Organisation. Also reimbursement is provided for treatment availed for certain health conditions such as Heart diseases, Kidney transplantation, Cancer, etc.

=== Education Scheme ===
Financial assistance is provided to children of the beneficiaries. The scholarship amount ranges from ₹1000 to ₹25,000 per year. Applications are processed through National Scholarship Portal.

=== Housing Scheme ===
Subsidy of ₹1,50,000 was provided through Revised Integrated Housing Scheme (RIHS), 2016. This scheme no longer administered by LWO and is converged with Pradhan Mantri Awas Yojana (PMAY) now.

== See also ==
- Ministry of Labour and Employment (MoL&E)
- Central Labour Service (CLS)
- Central Health Service (CHS)
