= Directorate General of Health Services =

Directorate General of Health Services may refer to:

- Directorate General of Health Services (Bangladesh)
- Directorate General of Health Services (India)
