= Dr. Ram Manohar Lohia Hospital =

Coordinates: 28.6257591°N 77.1984509°E

- Government of India

Geography
- Location: Baba Kharak Singh Marg, New Delhi, Delhi, India

Organisation
- Care system: Central government hospital
- Type: General & Teaching Hospital of Guru Gobind Singh Indraprastha University
- Affiliated university: Guru Gobind Singh Indraprastha University

Services
- Emergency department: 24 Hours tertiary-care emergency services
- Beds: 1420

History
- Former name: Willingdon Hospital
- Founded: 1932

Links
- Website: http://rmlh.nic.in/
- Lists: Hospitals in India

Dr. Ram Manohar Lohia Hospital (formerly known as Willingdon Hospital) is a hospital in New Delhi, India, operated by the Ministry of Health and Family Welfare of the Government of India. Atal Bihari Vajpayee Institute of Medical Sciences (formerly the Post Graduate Institute of Medical Education and Research, New Delhi), which offers undergraduate and postgraduate courses, is attached to this hospital

Established in 1932 by the British Raj as Willingdon Hospital after the Viceroy of India, Lord Willingdon, it was designed to serve their personnel and initially accommodated 54 beds. In 1954, following India's independence, control of the hospital was transferred to the Central Government's Ministry of Health and Family Welfare. In the 1970s, the hospital was renamed after Ram Manohar Lohia, a leading proponent of socialist ideology in India.

The hospital spans 30 acres (12 hectares), including 4 acres (1.6 hectares) dedicated to a nurses' hostel. Strategically located, it features a 71-bed nursing home for beneficiaries of the Central Government Health Scheme and offers extensive subspecialty care.

Annually, the hospital serves approximately 1.2 million outpatients, admits around 46,000 patients, and attends to about 150,000 emergency cases. With a capacity of 1,420 beds, it performs nearly 10,000 CT scans, 2,000 MRI scans, 200,000 X-rays, 2.8 million laboratory tests, 25,000 ultrasound scans, and conducts about 9,000 major and 40,000 minor surgeries each year. Additionally, the hospital operates dedicated daily OPDs exclusively for Central Government Health Scheme (CGHS) beneficiaries.

The hospital also plans to expand its capacity to approximately 3,000 beds, surpassing the capacity of Safdarjung Hospital.

== Academic ==
The hospital began offering an MBBS course in 2019 with 100 seats and has been running MD/MS programs since 2009, under the aegis of the Atal Bihari Vajpayee Institute of Medical Sciences (formerly known as the Post Graduate Institute of Medical Education and Research).

== See also ==
- Ministry of Health and Family Welfare
- Central Health Service (CHS)
- Ram Manohar Lohia
- Atal Bihari Vajpayee Institute of Medical Sciences
