= Jattinder GH Hospital, Ludhiana =

Geography
- Location: Pakowal Road, Ludhiana, Punjab, India
- Coordinates: 30.876712°N 75.803685°E

Organisation
- Type: General

Services
- Beds: 50

Links
- Lists: Hospitals in India

Jatinder GH Hospital is a modern 50 bed hospital situated in Pakowal Road, Ludhiana, Punjab, India.

The hospital is equipped with scanning equipment which includes a CT Scan, Mammography, Bone Mineral Density and Color Doppler. It has an ICU and a NICU for neonatal care. Other facilities available are a most modern dialysis unit, Lithotripsy and endourology setup. Facilities are also available for Cosmetic surgery.

A new blood purification machine, the first of its kind after AIIMS New Delhi, was being set up in the hospital in 2008, for patients with alcoholic liver diseases, kidney failure, rheumatoid arthritis, chronic skin diseases, drug overdose and poisoning, blood reactions in pregnant ladies having Rh incompatibility, and leukaemia. It is reported that the Hemopurifier, produced by Aethlon Medical, could filter out viruses and was being assessed at the hospital in a 30-day trial as an approach to treating HIV.

A separate plasma therapy department was also set up in 2008 under Dr R Srivastava from the department of Nephrology at Safdarjang Hospital in New Delhi.

Dr. Mrs. Jatinder Kaur Gambhir is the managing director of the hospital. She is a gynecologist with more than 20 years of experience.

In July 2008 a team of Health department officials raided the hospital when a woman from Rurka Khurd, Gorayan was being prepared for the abortion of a female foetus. Dr Jatinder Gambhir, owner of the hospital, was charged under the PNDT Act (Pre-Natal Diagnostic Techniques Act).

== Facilities ==
- Kidney, Ureter & Bladder Stones & Prostate Surgery through Rays & Laparoscopy
- Removal of Uterus Without any cut on abdomen
- Normal Delivery & Caesarean section
- Gall Bladder, Appendix, Hernia, Ovarian Surgery by Laparoscopic surgery
- Digital X-Ray, Mammography, CT Scan, Orthopaedics, Trauma Fractures & Joint Replacement
- 24x7 Trauma & All Emergencies
- Ambulance Facility Available
