= Banishree scholarship =

Scholarship scheme in Odisha, India

Banishree Scholarship
- ବାଣୀଶ୍ରୀ ଛାତ୍ରବୃତ୍ତି
- Type of project: Scholarship scheme
- Founder: Government of Odisha
- Country: India
- State: Odisha
- Ministry: Department of Social Security and Empowerment of Persons with Disabilities
- Website: ssepd.odisha.gov.in

The Banishree Scholarship is a state scholarship scheme implemented by the Government of Odisha. It provides financial scholarships to students with disabilities who are pursuing their education in schools, colleges, and universities in the state. The scheme is administered by the Social Security and Empowerment of Persons with Disabilities Department (SSEPD).

== History ==
The Banishree Scholarship was introduced as part of the welfare initiatives of the Government of Odisha for persons with disabilities. The scheme was designed to improve educational access and reduce dropout rates among disabled students.

== Eligibility & Conditions ==
=== Eligibility ===
The scheme shall apply to:

- Students in primary education (Standards I to V).
- Students studying in Middle and High Schools (Standards VI to X) and not covered under the scholarships provided by Government of India.
- Students studying in Colleges and Universities not covered under Government of India scholarship.
- Students studying in special schools registered under the Persons with Disabilities Act, 1995, but not getting grant-in-aid from State or Central Government.
- Students enrolled in distance learning at the accredited universities or government institutes.
- Students attending recognized institutions for technical, vocational or professional education.

=== Terms & Conditions ===
Applications for award of scholarship under the scheme shall be submitted subject to following conditions:

- The applicant should be a bonafide resident of Odisha.
- The candidate must be a regular student of a recognised educational institution.
- The annual parental or family income of the applicant should not be more than ₹60,000.
- No financial assistance, stipend or scholarship should be received by the applicant from any other scheme of the State Government or Central Government.
- A student shall continue to enjoy the scholarship if he/she continues to be enrolled and regularly attending a recognised institution, whether or not the student has passed or failed in a particular academic year.

== See also ==
- Government of Odisha
- Disability in India
- National Scholarship Portal
