= Central Health Service =

Civil Service of the Government of India

Service Overview
Abbreviation	CHS
Formed	01 May 1963 (63 years ago)
Country	Republic of India
Predecessor	Indian Medical Service (Civil) (1896-1947)
Cadre Controlling Authority	Ministry of Health and Family Welfare
Legal Personality	Governmental: Civil Service (Health Service)
Recruitment	Union Public Service Commission
Training Institute	NIHFW, New Delhi
Cadre Strength	4793 (2025)

Service Chief
Director General of Health Services	Dr. Loveneesh Gopal Krishna (CHS)

Central Health Service (CHS) is an Organised Central (Group-A) Civil Service of the Government of India. The Cadre controlling authority of Central Health Service is the Ministry of Health and Family Welfare (MoHFW) and it is the only Organised Group-A service under MoHFW. CHS is one of the three Organised Health Services of the Government of India, other two being the Indian Railway Health Service (IRHS) and Indian Ordnance Factory Health Service (IOFHS). CHS Officers are involved in providing clinical care, medical education, health administration and implementation of Health Programs through various Central Government Institutions.

CHS has 4 sub-cadres

1. General Duty Medical Officers (GDMO)
2. Teaching Specialists (T)
3. Non-Teaching Specialists (NT)
4. Public Health Specialists (PH)

The CHS posts are Gazetted and the roles & responsibilities of the CHS Officers varies with the sub-cadre and the organisation/units to which the appointments are made.

== History ==
In 1957, the Government of India initiated steps to constitute a Central Health Service, consisting of all posts in the Central Health Cadre such as Medical, Public Health and Medical Research posts in the General Central Services Class I and Class II, excluding the posts under Ministries of Railways and Defence. The Rules for the Constitution of the Central Health Service was notified in May 1963. Initially the service had two streams, (i) General Duty Officer (GDO) and (ii) Specialists. MBBS Graduates were recruited at GDO Grade II which was a Class II post and were eligible for promotion after 5 years to GDO Grade I, which was a Class I post. Doctors with Post-Graduate Qualification were also recruited to GDO stream, but at GDO Grade I level.

Though an All India Service called Indian Medical and Health Service (IMHS) was planned to be constituted with CHS officers in 1969, it was not implemented. In 1973, CHS was declared as a Class I service. Till 1974, the Medical and Public Health posts under the Municipal Corporation of Delhi (MCD) was included in CHS. On 18 February 1977, the UPSC conducted the first Combined Examination for recruitment to Medical posts under Central Government, including CHS. Prior to 1977, the selection to these posts was on the basis of interview. In 1982, CHS was restructured into 4 sub-cadres, as it exists today.

On 21 August 1989, a Memorandum of Settlement (MOS) was signed between the Government and the Joint Action Council of Service Doctors Organisations (JACSDO) to improve the service conditions and the career progression. Following this a High Power Committee (Tikku Committee) was constituted to look into these issues.

== Recruitment ==
The Union Public Service Commission (UPSC) conducts the Combined Medical Services Examination (CMSE) every year to recruit officers to various health service cadres including to Medical Officer Grade (Level-10 / Junior Time Scale) of GDMO sub-cadre of CHS. There is a separate recruitment process by UPSC for the Specialist posts of the remaining sub-cadres. The recruitment to Specialist Sub-cadre are done at Level-11 (Senior Time Scale).

== Training ==
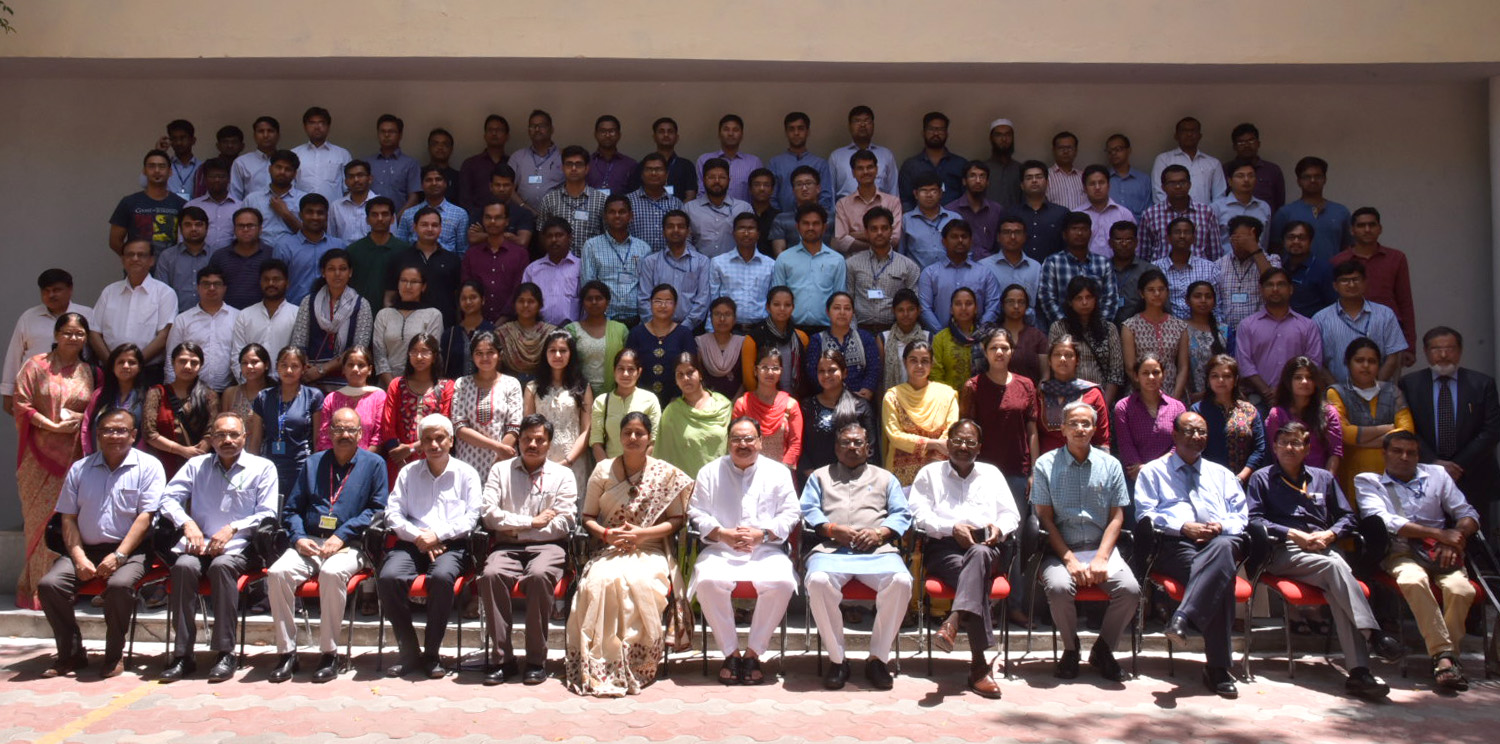
The Union Minister for Health and Family Welfare, Shri J. P. Nadda with the General Duty Medical Officers of the First Foundation Training Programme

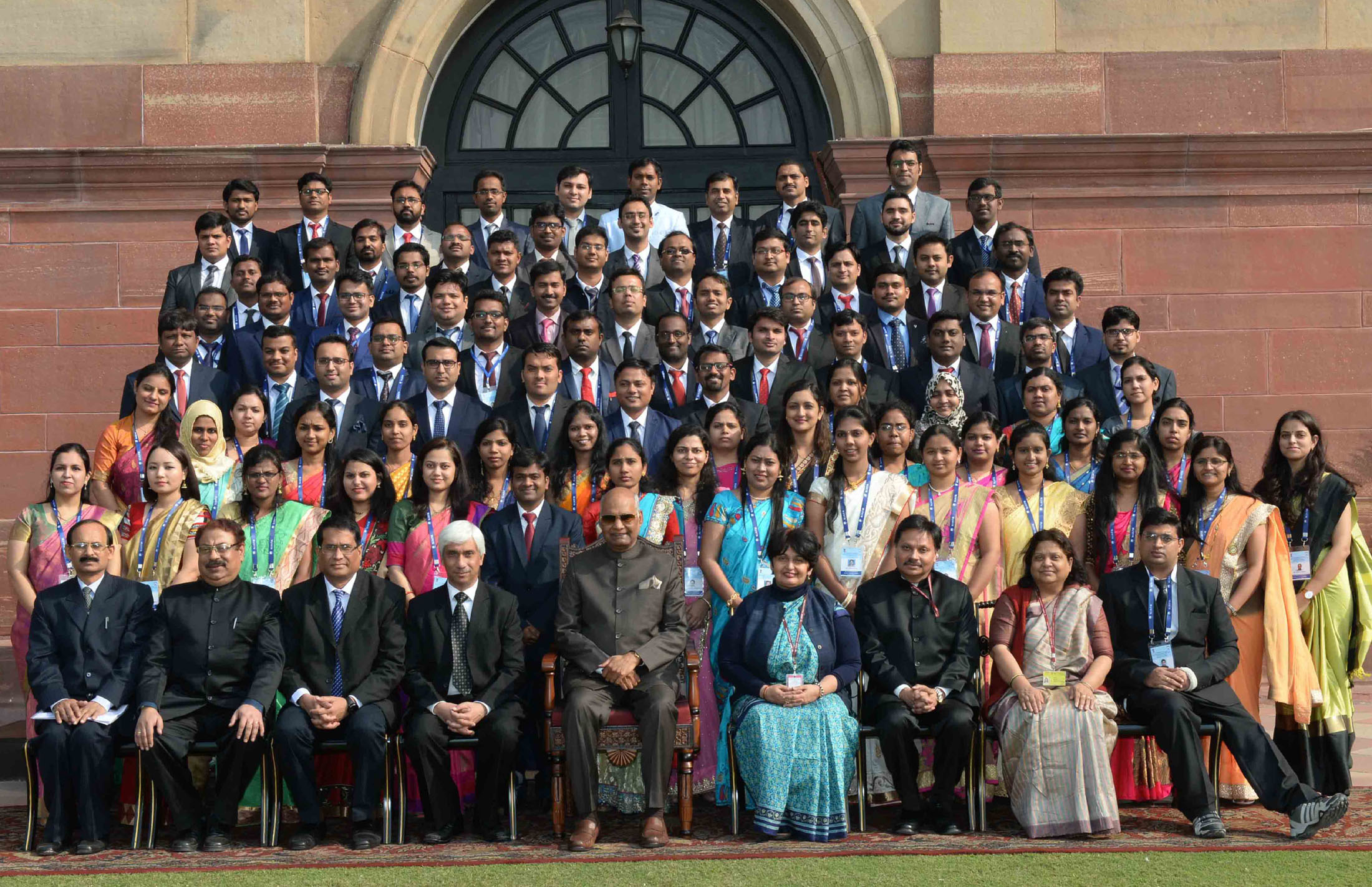
The President, Shri Ram Nath Kovind with the General Duty Medical Officers of the 2nd Foundation Training Programme.

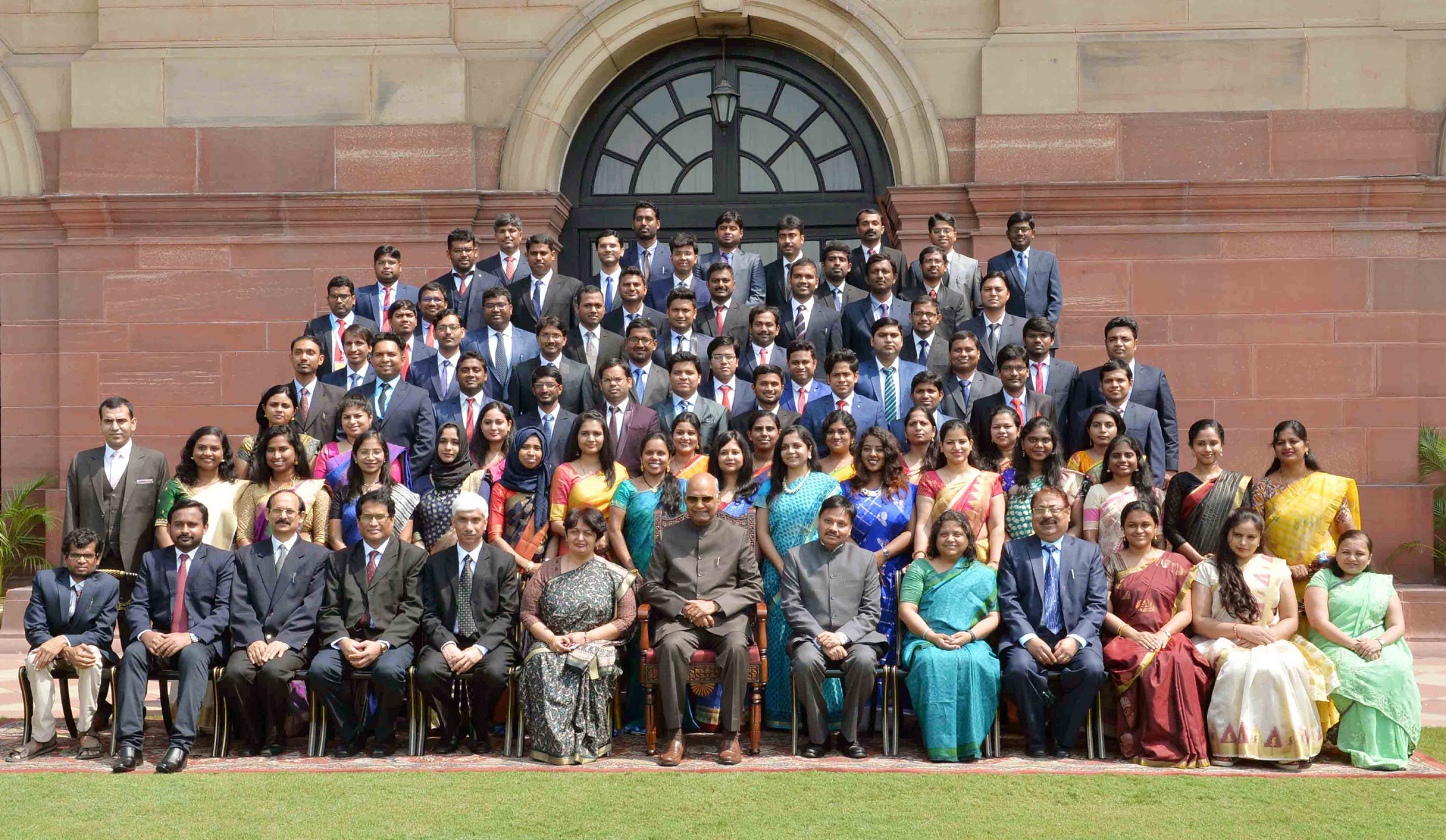
The President, Shri Ram Nath Kovind with the General Duty Medical Officers of the 3rd Foundation Training Programme.

General Duty Medical Officers of the CHS undergo their Foundation Training Program (FTP) with special focus on Health administration at the National Institute of Health and Family Welfare (NIHFW), New Delhi.

== Participating Units of CHS ==
CHS officers are posted at various participating units/organisations all over India

Ministry	Organisation	Unit
Ministry of Health and Family Welfare	Directorate General of Health Services	Safdarjung Hospital
Ministry of Health and Family Welfare	Directorate General of Health Services	Dr. RML Hospital
Ministry of Health and Family Welfare	Directorate General of Health Services	Lady Hardinge Medical College
Ministry of Health and Family Welfare	Directorate General of Health Services	Rural Health Training Centre, Najafgarh
Ministry of Health and Family Welfare	Directorate General of Health Services	Point of Entry Health Organizations (APHO/PHO/LPHO)
Ministry of Health and Family Welfare	Directorate General of Health Services	Regional Office of Health and Family Welfare (ROHFW)
Ministry of Health and Family Welfare	Directorate General of Health Services	National Centre for Disease Control
Ministry of Health and Family Welfare	Directorate General of Health Services	National Vector Borne Disease Control Programme
Ministry of Health and Family Welfare	Directorate General of Health Services	National Organ and Tissue Transplant Organisation (NOTTO)
Ministry of Health and Family Welfare	Directorate General of Health Services	Central Health Education Bureau (CHEB)
Ministry of Health and Family Welfare	Directorate General of Health Services	All India Institute of Hygiene and Public Health
Ministry of Health and Family Welfare	Directorate General of Health Services	All India Institute of Physical Medicine and Rehabilitation
Ministry of Health and Family Welfare	Directorate General of Health Services	Central Leprosy Teaching and Research Institute (CLTRI), Chengalpattu
Ministry of Health and Family Welfare	Directorate General of Health Services	Central Research Institute, Kasauli
Ministry of Health and Family Welfare	Directorate General of Health Services	Central Institute of Psychiatry, Ranchi
Ministry of Health and Family Welfare	Directorate General of Health Services	BCG Vaccine Laboratory, Guindy
Ministry of Health and Family Welfare	Department of Health and Family Welfare	Central Government Health Scheme (CGHS)
Ministry of Health and Family Welfare	Department of Health and Family Welfare	National AIDS Control Organisation (NACO)
Ministry of Health and Family Welfare	Department of Health and Family Welfare	National Institute of Public Health Training and Research
Ministry of Labour and Employment	Directorate General of Labour Welfare	Labour Welfare Organisation (Beedi, Cine, Non-Coal Mine Dispensaries)
Ministry of Jal Shakti	Department of Water Resources, River Development and Ganga Rejuvenation	Central Water and Power Research Station, Pune
Ministry of Science and Technology	Department of Science and Technology	Survey of India
Ministry of Personnel, Public Grievances and Pensions	Department of Personnel and Training	Lal Bahadur Shastri National Academy of Administration, Mussoorie
Ministry of Home Affairs	Department of Internal Security	Sardar Vallabhbhai Patel National Police Academy, Hyderabad
Ministry of Home Affairs	Department of Internal Security	Intelligence Bureau

== Cadre Structure ==
Cadre structure as per the CHS Rules 2014 and the CHS Amendment Rules 2019

CENTRAL HEALTH SERVICE (CHS)
Sl. No.	Sub-Cadre	Sanctioned Strength
1	General Duty Medical Officers (GDMO)	2319
2	Teaching Specialist (T)	1716
3	Non-Teaching Specialist (NT)	654
4	Public Health Specialist (PH)	104
Total		4793

Grade	GDMO	Teaching Specialist	Non-Teaching Specialist	Public Health Specialist	Pay Level in the 7th CPC Pay Matrix
Apex Scale	Director General of Health Services (DGHS)				Level - 17
Apex Scale	Special Director General of Health Services				Level - 17
Higher Administrative Grade (HAG)	Additional Director General of Health Services				Level - 15
Senior Administrative Grade (SAG) GP- 10000	Senior Chief Medical Officer (SAG)	Director Professor	Consultant	Advisor	Level - 14
Non Functional Selection Grade (NFSG) GP- 8700	Chief Medical Officer (NFSG)	Professor	Specialist Grade I	Specialist Grade I	Level - 13
Junior Administrative Grade (JAG) GP- 7600	Chief Medical Officer	Associate Professor	Specialist Grade II	Specialist Grade II	Level - 12
Senior Time Scale (STS) GP- 6600	Senior Medical Officer	Assistant Professor	Specialist Grade III	Specialist Grade III	Level - 11
Junior Time Scale (JTS) GP - 5400	Medical Officer				Level - 10

== Career Progression ==
=== Dynamic Assured Career Progression (DACP) Scheme ===
Central Health Service Officers are covered under the Dynamic Assured Career Progression (DACP) Scheme which provides time-bound promotion up to Senior Administrative Grade (SAG) without linkage to vacancies.

Years of Service	1	2	3	4	5	6	7	8	9	10	11	12	13	14	15	16	17	18	19	20	Senior Administrative Grade Level 14
GDMO Sub-cadre	Medical Officer				Senior Medical Officer					Chief Medical Officer				Chief Medical Officer (NFSG)							Senior Administrative Grade Level 14
Level/Grade	Level 10				Level 11					Level 12				Level 13							Senior Administrative Grade Level 14
Years of Service								1	2	3	4	5	6	7	8	9	10	11	12	13	Senior Administrative Grade Level 14
Specialists Sub-cadres								Grade III		Grade II				Grade I							Senior Administrative Grade Level 14

=== Promotion to Higher Administrative Grade (HAG) ===
Vacancy based promotion from a combined eligibility list of Senior Administrative Grade (Level 14) officers from all the four sub-cadres of CHS. Senior Administrative Grade (SAG) Officers with 3 years regular service in the Grade are eligible to be considered for HAG Posts. Additional DGHS with 2 years regular service in HAG is eligible to be considered for special DGHS. The Senior-most Special DGHS shall function as the Director General of Health Services.

Seniority List of HAG level Officers of CHS
No.	Name of the Officer	Sub-cadre	Date of appointment in HAG	Date of attainment of 62 Years
DIRECTOR GENERAL OF HEALTH SERVICES
1.	_	_	_	_
SPECIAL DGHS
1.				
2.				
ADDITIONAL DGHS / HEADS OF INSTITUTIONS & ORGANISATIONS / NATIONAL PROGRAMMES
1.	Dr. Sunita Sharma	Teaching (T)	30 December 2024	7 June 2026
2.	Dr. Sujata Chaudhary	Teaching (T)	30 December 2024	15 June 2026
3.	Dr. Sunita Mondal	Teaching (T)	30 December 2024	8 January 2026
4.	Dr. Rajender P Joshi	GDMO	30 December 2024	19 May 2026
5.	Dr. Rajshree	GDMO	27 March 2025	28 June 2026
6.	Dr. C K Kansal	GDMO	27 March 2025	5 August 2026
7.	Dr. Lovenesh Gopal Krishna	Teaching (T)	27 March 2025	29 July 2027
8.	Dr. Rajendra Kumar Arya	Non-Teaching (NT)	27 March 2025	1 May 2026
9.	Dr. D Vinod Kumar	GDMO	27 March 2025	17 May 2026
Professor of Excellence / Principal Consultant / Principal Advisor / Senior CMO (HAG)
10.				
11.				
12.				
13.				
14.				
15.				
16.				

=== Non-Functional Upgradation ===
Whenever an Indian Administrative Service (IAS) Officer is posted at the Centre at a particular Grade, the Batch of Officers of the Organised Group A Services (including CHS) who are senior by two years or more, and not yet promoted to that Grade are granted non-functional financial upgradation to that Grade.

== Special Allowances ==
=== Non Practicing Allowance (NPA) ===
Paid at the rate of 20% of Basic Pay, subject to the condition that the sum of Basic Pay and NPA does not exceed ₹2,37,500 (the average of Apex Level and the Level of Cabinet Secretary). NPA is treated as Pay for the purpose of calculation of Dearness Allowance and other allowances, except where the orders explicitly state otherwise, including for calculation of retirement benefits.

=== Post Graduate Allowance ===
Paid to CHS Officers of GDMO sub-cadre, upto the level of CMO(NFSG), who possess Post-Graduate Degree and Post-Graduate Diploma, at the rate of ₹2250 and ₹1350 respectively. The rates increases by 25% each time the Dearness Allowance (DA) rises by 50%.

== Retirement ==
As per Rule 56 clause (bb) of the Fundamental Rules 1922, the age of superannuation of the Central Health Service (CHS) officers is 62 years, unless they exercise the option of posting to non-administrative posts, in case they desire to continue in their service up to the age of 65 years.

The officers who joined the service before 1 January 2004 are covered under Central Civil Services (Pension) Rules 1972, which provides an assured pension on retirement. The Officers who joined on or after 1 January 2004 are covered under National Pension System, which is a contributory pension scheme. The Government has introduced the Unified Pension Scheme with effect from 1 April 2025 which ensures a defined payout on retirement.

== Notable Officers ==
- Dr. Jagadish Prasad: Former Director General of Health Services and Padma Shri Awardee (1991).
- Dr. Archana Majumdar: Member of National commission for Women (Since 21 October 2024).

== See also ==
- Ministry of Health and Family Welfare (MoHFW)
- Directorate General of Health Services (DGHS)
- Combined Medical Services Examination (CMSE)
- Indian Railway Health Service (IRHS)
- Indian Medical Service (IMS)
- Army Medical Corps (India)
- Central Civil Services
