= Indian Railway Health Service =

Indian government organisation

The Indian Railway Health Service (IRHS) is an organised central Group A civil service of the Government of India under the Ministry of Railways, consisting of doctors recruited by the Union Public Service Commission's (UPSC) Combined Medical Services Examination. The officers of this service are responsible for providing comprehensive health care to serving railway employees, retired railway employees and their dependents, as well as other categories of staff such as contractors, vendors and licensed porters.

Previously known as the Indian Railway Medical Service, the organisation was renamed as the Indian Railway Health Service (IRHS) on 15 January 2020, because of the introduction of the Indian Railways Management Service (IRMS).

== See also ==
- Centralised Training Institutes of the Indian Railways
- Central Health Service (CHS)
- Indian Railways organisational structure
