= Puliyur Krishnaswamy Duraiswami =

Indian orthopedic surgeon

- Born: 23 April 1912; Puliyur, India
- Died: 11 March 1974 (aged 61)
- Occupation: Orthopedic surgeon
- Years active: 1942–1974
- Known for: Orthopedic research Medical academics
- Awards: Padma Bhushan; BOA Robert Jones Medal; BOA Presidential Merit Award

Puliyur Krishnaswamy Duraiswami (1912–1974) was an Indian orthopedic surgeon, medical writer and the Director General of Health Services under the Government of India. Besides being a Fellow of the Royal College of Surgeons of England and a founder Fellow of the National Academy of Medical Sciences, he published several articles on orthopedics and was a recipient of Robert Jones Medal and the Presidential Merit Award of the British Orthopaedic Association. The Government of India awarded him the third highest civilian honour of the Padma Bhushan, in 1966, for his contributions to the Medical Science.

== Biography ==
Duraiswami was born on 23 April 1912 at Puliyur, in the south Indian state of Tamil Nadu and secured his graduate (MBBS) and post graduate (MS) degrees in medicine from the University of Madras, Chennai in 1936 and 1942 respectively. Starting his career as a surgeon at the Government Royapettah Hospital in 1942 and working there for one year, he joined the Armed Forces towards the later stages of World War II and served the forces till 1947 as a surgical specialist. In 1948, he moved to England, on a research fellowship from the University of Liverpool, and stayed there at the Department of Surgery of the university from where he secured MCh, and later, FRCS in 1949. Continuing his researches, he obtained a doctoral degree from the university in 1951, reportedly the first time the University of Liverpool awarding a doctorate in orthopedics for an original research. Afterwards, he worked at the Johns Hopkins University as a member of faculty in orthopedic surgery for two years. His stay of five years in UK earned him several honours including a Hunterian Professorship of Liverpool University and two medals, the Robert Jones Medal and the Presidential Merit Award, from the British Orthopaedic Association.

He returned to India in 1953 to join the All India Institute of Medical Sciences, Delhi, as the chairman of the Department of Orthopaedic Surgery and contributed to the establishment of the Central Institute of Orthopaedics, New Delhi, as a satellite centre of the Safdarjang Hospital, New Delhi. In 1954, he was appointed as the director of the Institute but moved to the hospital mainstream activities as the senior orthopedic surgeon in 1960, a post he held till his death in 1974. He also held the post of the Director General of Health Services of the Government of India, advising on orthopaedics and rehabilitation related matters, during which time he is reported to have proposed and implemented the concept of mobile medical units as an outreach programme to cater to the rural areas. When the National Academy of Medical Sciences was established in 1961, he was among the founder fellows of the Academy. He was the author of several notable articles on orthopedics and a historical account, 5000 years of Orthopaedics in India. The Government awarded him the third highest civilian honour of the Padma Bhushan in 1966. Duraiswami, a Fellow of the Royal College of Surgeons of England, died on 11 March 1974, succumbing to the complexities following a cerebral haemorrhage.
