= National Institute of Health and Family Welfare =

Government organization in New Delhi, India

- Founded: 9 March 1977 (49 years ago)
- Headquarters: Munirka, New Delhi
- Location: India
- Coordinates: 28.55°N 77.17°E
- Parent organisation: Ministry of Health and Family Welfare
- Website: nihfw.ac.in

The National Institute of Health and Family Welfare (NIHFW) is an autonomous, apex technical institute under the Ministry of Health and Family Welfare (MoHFW). The Institute focuses on training and research in the fields of public health, health administration and management.

== History ==
NIHFW was formed in 1977 by the merger of National Institute of Health Administration and Education (NIHAE) and National Institute of Family Planning (NIFP).

== Roles and Functions ==
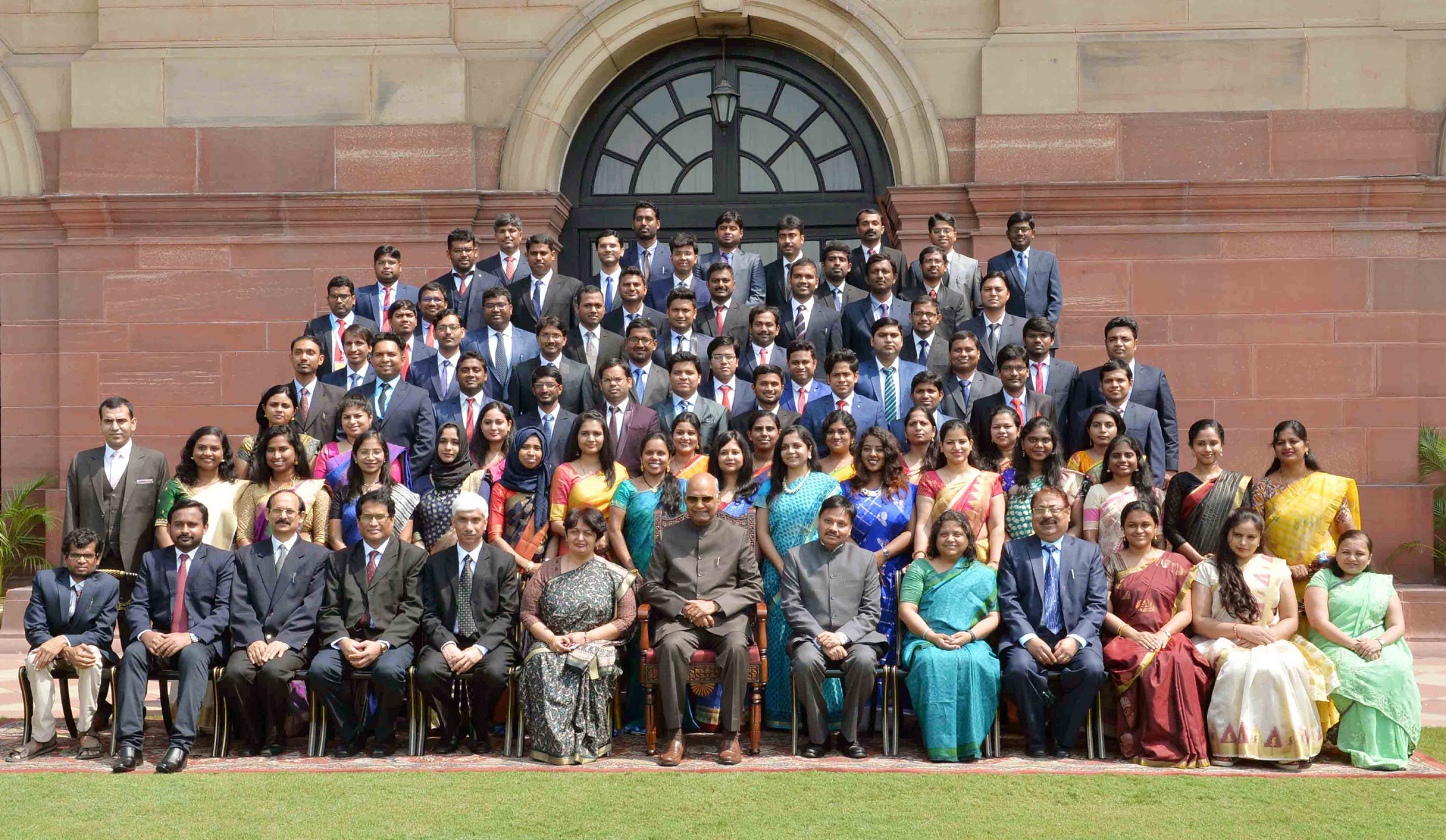

NIHFW conducts training program for healthcare professionals including in-service training. It also conducts the Foundation Training Program (FTP) for the newly joined Central Health Service (CHS) officers.

NIHFW also conducts post-graduate education courses such as MD in Community Health Administration (CHA), Post-graduate Diploma in Health Administration (DHA), Post-graduate Diploma in Public Health Management (PGDPHM), Masters of Public Health (MPH) and Ph.D. Programme.

NIHFW also hosts National Cold-Chain and Vaccine Management Resource Centre for capacity building of Cold-Chain technicians involved in Universal Immunization Programme (UIP).

== See also ==
- Ministry of Health and Family Welfare
- Central Health Service (CHS)
