= Central Labour Service =

Indian civil service group

CENTRAL LABOUR SERVICE
Service Overview
- Abbreviation: CLS
- Formed: 1987
- Country: India
- Training Grounds: V. V. Giri National Labour Institute, Noida
- Controlling Authority: Ministry of Labour and Employment, Government of India
- Legal Personality: Governmental; Civil Service
- General Nature: Labour Administration; Industrial Harmony
- Cadre Size: 340
- Association: Central Labour Service Officers Association

Service Chief
- Chief Labour Commissioner (Central): Shri K Shekhar

Head of the Civil Services
- Cabinet Secretary: Smt Sumita Dawara, IAS

The Central Labour Service (CLS) cadre is an Organized Group 'A' Central Civil Services of the Government of India. It was formed in February 1987 by amalgamating 3 bodies: Labour Officers (Central Pool), Central Industrial Relations Machinery and Welfare Organisation of the Ministry of Labour. Its main roles are to implement labour and welfare laws, and intervene in disputes with the goal of preventing strike action.

== Constitution ==
Consequent to 1st Cadre Review in October 2004, the Central Labour Service was constituted as an Organized Group ‘A’ Service with effect from 14.10.2004. Officers of Central Labour Service (CLS) are recruited by Union Public Service Commission (UPSC).

Consequent to 2nd Cadre Review of Central Labour Service in 2013, total sanctioned strength of CLS Officers is revised to 340 posts and distributed amongst four streams viz.

- Central Industrial Relations Machinery (CIRM)[CLC(C)] – 125 posts
- Directorate General of Labour Welfare (DGLW) - 42 posts
- Ministry of Labour & Employment (Main Secretariat) -05 posts
- Factory Side (Central Pool) Participating establishments under various other Ministries/Departments -168 posts.

Central Labour Service comprises 5 Grades, namely, Junior Time Scale (JTS), Senior Time Scale (STS), Junior Administrative Grade (JAG), Non Functional Selection Grade (NFSG), Senior Administrative Grade (SAG) and Higher Administrative Grade (HAG).

== The Main Functions of CLS Officers ==
- Ensuring harmonious industrial relations between the Management and Workers in the Central Sphere.
- Enforcement of Labour Laws and Rules made there-under in the Central Sphere.
- Intervention, mediation and conciliation in industrial disputes in order to bring about settlement of disputes.
- Intervention in situations of threatened strikes and lockouts with a view to avert the strikes and lockouts.
- Implementation of Labour Welfare Schemes under various Labour Welfare Acts/ Schemes.

== Rank Hierarchy ==
- Assistant Labour Commissioner equivalent to Assistant Secretary to Government of India (Pay Level: 10)
- Regional Labour Commissioner equivalent to Under Secretary to Government of India (Pay Level: 11)
- Deputy Chief Labour Commissioner equivalent to Deputy Secretary to Government of India (Pay Level: 12)
- Deputy Chief Labour Commissioner (NFSG Grade on entering 14 year of Service) equivalent to Director to Government of India (Pay Level:13)
- Additional Chief Labour Commissioner equivalent to Joint Secretary to Government of India (Pay Level: 14)
- Chief Labour Commissioner equivalent to Additional Secretary to Government of India (Pay Level: 15)
