= Singamparai =

- village
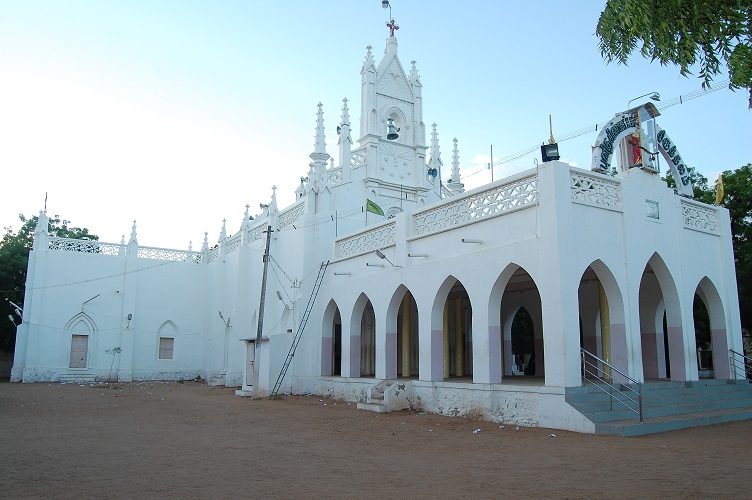
- St. Paul's Church, Singamparai

- Location in Tamil Nadu, India Singamparai (India)
- Coordinates: 8°44′N 77°32′E
- Country: India
- State: Tamil Nadu
- District: Tirunelveli
- Elevation: 64 m (210 ft)

Languages
  - Official: Tamil
- Time zone: UTC+5:30 (IST)
- Postal code: 627601
- Website: http://singamparai.com

Singamparai is a village in Mukkudal Town Panchayat, situated just north of Mukkudal in Tirunelveli District, Tamil Nadu, India, with the Population about 5000 live in the village.

== History ==
The village has the history about 200 years. The people who had adopted the Christianity came from the village Somanthamperi. They Bought lands from the land-lords of pettai and settled down here. They built a church in 1929 dedicated to St. paul the apostle.

== Churches and Parish ==
The church of St. Paul the apostle is the biggest church of the village and it became a Catholic parish church in 1931, separated from Sendamaram parish and its first parish priest was Fr. A. Couturier S.J. In 2013, Thalarkulam became a new parish and separated from singamparai parish. Now the parish area covered includes the villages Mylapuram, Ilanthaikulam, Mukkudal, Pappakudi and Ariyanayagipuram.

There is also a Latin Church of St. Antony of Padua, and another church in the village.

== Grottoes ==
There are grottoes around the village for St. Antony of Paduva, Our Lady of Perpetual Help, Annai Velankanni and Archangel St. Michael.

== Schools ==
R.C.Primary School and St.Paul Hr. Sec. School are the two schools in the village run by the Roman Catholic Diocese of Palayamkottai and managed by the parish priest.
