= Atal Bihari Vajpayee Institute of Medical Sciences and Dr. RML Hospital =

Medical college in New Delhi, India

Atal Bihari Vajpayee Institute of Medical Sciences and Dr. Ram Manohar Lohia Hospital
- Other names: Dr. Ram Manohar Lohia Hospital (since 1954)
- Former names: Willingdon Hospital (1932–1954)
- Motto: seva karuna nishtha kaushal
- Type: Public medical school under Ministry of Health and Family Welfare, Government of India
- Established: 2009; 17 years ago (as PGIMER, New Delhi); August 16, 2019; 6 years ago (as ABVIMS)
- Affiliations: National Medical Commission
- Academic affiliations: Guru Gobind Singh Indraprastha University
- Budget: ₹1,458.26 crore (US$150 million) (2025–26)
- Principal: Dr. Ratnakar Sahoo
- Director: Dr. Akhilandeshwari Prasad
- Undergraduates: 500
- Location: New Delhi, Delhi, India; 28.625°N 77.199°E
- Campus: Urban
- Website: rmlh.nic.in

Atal Bihari Vajpayee Institute of Medical Sciences and Dr. Ram Manohar Lohia Hospital, formerly Post Graduate Institute of Medical Education and Research (PGIMER), New Delhi is a medical training and research institute located in New Delhi, India. It is attached with Dr. Ram Manohar Lohia Hospital. The institute is affiliated to Guru Gobind Singh Indraprastha University. As a post-graduate medical and research institute, it was founded in 2009. In 2019, It started MBBS course with 100 seats.

== History ==
The inauguration of the college was done by the Minister of Health and Family Welfare, Dr. Harsh Vardhan on 16 August 2019, on the 1st death anniversary of former Prime Minister and Bharat Ratna Shree Atal Bihari Vajpayee. The first batch of MBBS students joined the college in August 2019.

The Institute has senior faculties transferred from VMMC & Safdarjung Hospital for non-clinical subjects followed by other teaching faculty from Dr. RML Hospital. The current infrastructure will be enhanced further with a dedicated building for academics of undergraduates, 23-storey hostel building for post graduates, resident doctors and undergraduate students.

== Affiliations ==
The institute is affiliated to Guru Gobind Singh Indraprastha University and is funded by Government of India.

== Infrastructure ==
The college runs in the PGIMER, New Delhi building attached to the Dr. Ram Manohar Lohia Hospital campus. It has state-of-the-art lecture theatres, dissection hall, physiology, biochemistry, microbiology labs and a state-of-the-art library.

== Annual Fest ==
ABVIMS and Dr. RML Hospital hosts an annual fest called REVELS. In REVELS 2023, singer Darshan Raval was invited. In this three-days fest, there was a total footfall of 15,000. Considering Delhi's medical colleges, it was the second-largest fest but the most organised one.

== See also ==
- Jawaharlal Institute of Postgraduate Medical Education and Research, Puducherry
- National Institute of Mental Health and Neurosciences, Bengaluru
- Postgraduate Institute of Medical Education and Research, Chandigarh
- Sanjay Gandhi Postgraduate Institute of Medical Sciences, Lucknow
