= Combined Medical Services Examination =

Indian medical officer recruitment exam for various civil health services

- Civil Service Exam in India

Exam Overview
Acronym	UPSC CMSE
Type	Objective Type
Administrator	Union Public Service Commission
Year started	1977 (49 years ago)
Skills tested	Medical knowledge (MBBS level)
Purpose	Recruitment of Group A Medical Officers
Duration	Paper I - 2 hours Paper II - 2 hours Personality Test ~ 30 minutes
Maximum Marks	Paper I - 250; Paper II - 250; Personality Test - 100
Negative Marking	Yes
Offered	Once a year
Regions	India
Languages	English
Number of Applicants	50,334 (2023)
Number of Test takers	27,808 (2023)
Applicants to Posts Ratio	39.92 (2023)
Prerequisites	MBBS Degree
Fee	₹200
Used by	CHS; IRHS; NDMC; MCD
Website	https://upsc.gov.in/

The Combined Medical Services Examination or the CMS Examination is conducted by the Union Public Service Commission (UPSC) for recruitment of Medical Officers (Group A posts) to various Government Services/Organizations such as the Central Health Service (CHS), Indian Railways, Municipal Corporation of Delhi and New Delhi Municipal Council.

In 2024, Employees' State Insurance Corporation (ESIC) announced recruitment to the posts of Insurance Medical Officers Grade-II in ESI Corporation through the disclosure lists of Combined Medical Services Examination conducted in the years 2022 and 2023.

== History ==
The Combined Examination for recruitment to Medical posts under Central Government was first conducted by UPSC on 18 February 1977. Prior to 1977, recruitment to these posts was on the basis of interview. CMSE 2007 introduced the Negative Marking in the evaluation of Objective type question papers. From CMSE 2010 onwards, female candidates were granted exemption from payment of exam fee. CMSE 2014 introduced the Computer Based Mode of Examination. From CMSE 2017 onwards, UPSC implemented the Public Disclosure Scheme for making publicly available the Scores of those candidates who appeared in the final stage of the examination but were not recommended. This is to ensure that other recruiting bodies can use this data to recruit these qualified candidates who are willing to publicly disclose their scores. Syllabus of the examination was changed in CMSE 2018. From CMSE 2020 onwards, the upper age limit for Medical Officer Grade of CHS GDMO sub-cadre was enhanced from 32 years to 35 years.

== Services/Posts ==
Through Combined Medical Services Examination, the Medical Officers are being recruited to following services or organisations.

CATEGORY - I
1	Medical Officer Grade (Level 10) in the General Duty Medical Officer (GDMO) sub-cadre of the Central Health Service (CHS)
CATEGORY - II
1	Assistant Divisional Medical Officer (ADMO) in the Indian Railway Health Service (IRHS)
2	General Duty Medical Officer in the New Delhi Municipal Council
3	General Duty Medical Officer Grade -II in the Municipal Corporation of Delhi

== Eligibility Criteria ==
- Nationality: Citizen of India; Subject of Nepal or Bhutan; and some Tibetan refugees, a person of Indian origin who has migrated from Pakistan, Burma, Sri Lanka or East African Countries of Kenya, Uganda, the United Republic of Tanzania, Zambia, Malawi, Zaire and Ethiopia or from Vietnam with the intention of permanently settling in India.
- Age: Must not have attained the age of 32 years (for the Central Health Service (CHS) posts, the upper age limit must not exceed 35 years), with relaxations for various categories such as SC, ST & OBC.
- Educational Qualifications: Passed the written and practical parts of the final MBBS Examination.

== Scheme of Examination ==
=== Part I : Written Examination ===
An objective-type written examination with two papers of two hours duration, each carrying a maximum of 250 marks. Both papers are attempted on the same day.

Paper I

Maximum Marks : 250

Subject	Questions
General Medicine	96
Paediatrics	24

Paper II

Maximum Marks : 250

Subject	Questions
Surgery (including ENT, Ophthalmology, Traumatology and Orthopaedics)	40
Gynaecology & Obstetrics	40
Preventive & Social Medicine	40

Candidates who qualify in the written examination are called for an Interview/Personality Test.

=== Part II : Personality Test ===
Personality Test carrying 100 marks conducted by the Union Public Service Commission for those candidates qualifying the written examination.

=== Medical Examination ===
The candidates need to undergo a medical examination to assess fitness, prior to appointment.

== Exam Statistics ==
Year of Examination	2015	2016	2017	2018	2019	2020	2021	2022	2023	2024	2025	2026
Number of Posts	1402	1025	717	504	919	560	845	687	1261	827	705	1358
Number of Applicants	31,786	33,986	39,166	40,556	36,415	43,120	60,154	49,026	50,334			
Candidates appeared for Exam	15,420	16,864	18,183	19,873	19,479	20,213	23,299	20,613	27,808			
Candidates Interviewed	2998	3288	1585	1447	1856	1150	1176	963	2538			
Applicants to Posts Ratio (APR)	22.67	33.15	54.62	80.46	39.62	77.00	71.19	71.36	39.92			

Cut-off Marks
Year of Examination		2020	2021	2022	2023	2024	2025
Cut-off Marks at Final Stage (Out of 600)	Category - I	365	370	324	332	403	380.20
Cut-off Marks at Final Stage (Out of 600)	Category - II	357	369	319	322	386	368.45

== Cadre allocation ==
Once the final results are declared by the UPSC, the cadre allocation for the selected candidates are done by the CHS-I section of the Ministry of Health & Family Welfare (MoHFW) according to the cadre preferences submitted by the candidates and their ranks.

== See also ==
- Central Health Service (CHS)
- Indian Railways Health Service (IRHS)
- Union Public Service Commission (UPSC)
- Employees' State Insurance Corporation (ESIC)
