= Mukkudal =

- town
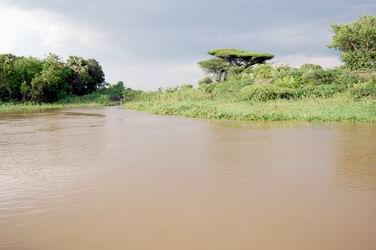

- Location in Tamil Nadu, India
- Coordinates: 8°44′47″N 77°31′32″E
- Country: India
- State: Tamil Nadu
- District: Tirunelveli

Population (2011)
  - Total: 14,983

Languages
  - Official: Tamil
- Time zone: UTC+5:30 (IST)

Mukkudal is a panchayat town in Tirunelveli district in the state of Tamil Nadu in India.

Mukkudal was upgraded to Town Panchayat according to Tamil Nadu Panchayats Act, 1994 (ratifications to 73rd and 74th Amendment of the Constitution of India) after its establishment. Adding nearest villages: Sadayapuram, Singamparai, Kaliyankulam, Lakshmiyapuram to Mukkudal, Mukkudal Town Panchayat was established. Th panchayat has 15 wards with each ward represented by a member who is elected through the statewide local elections.

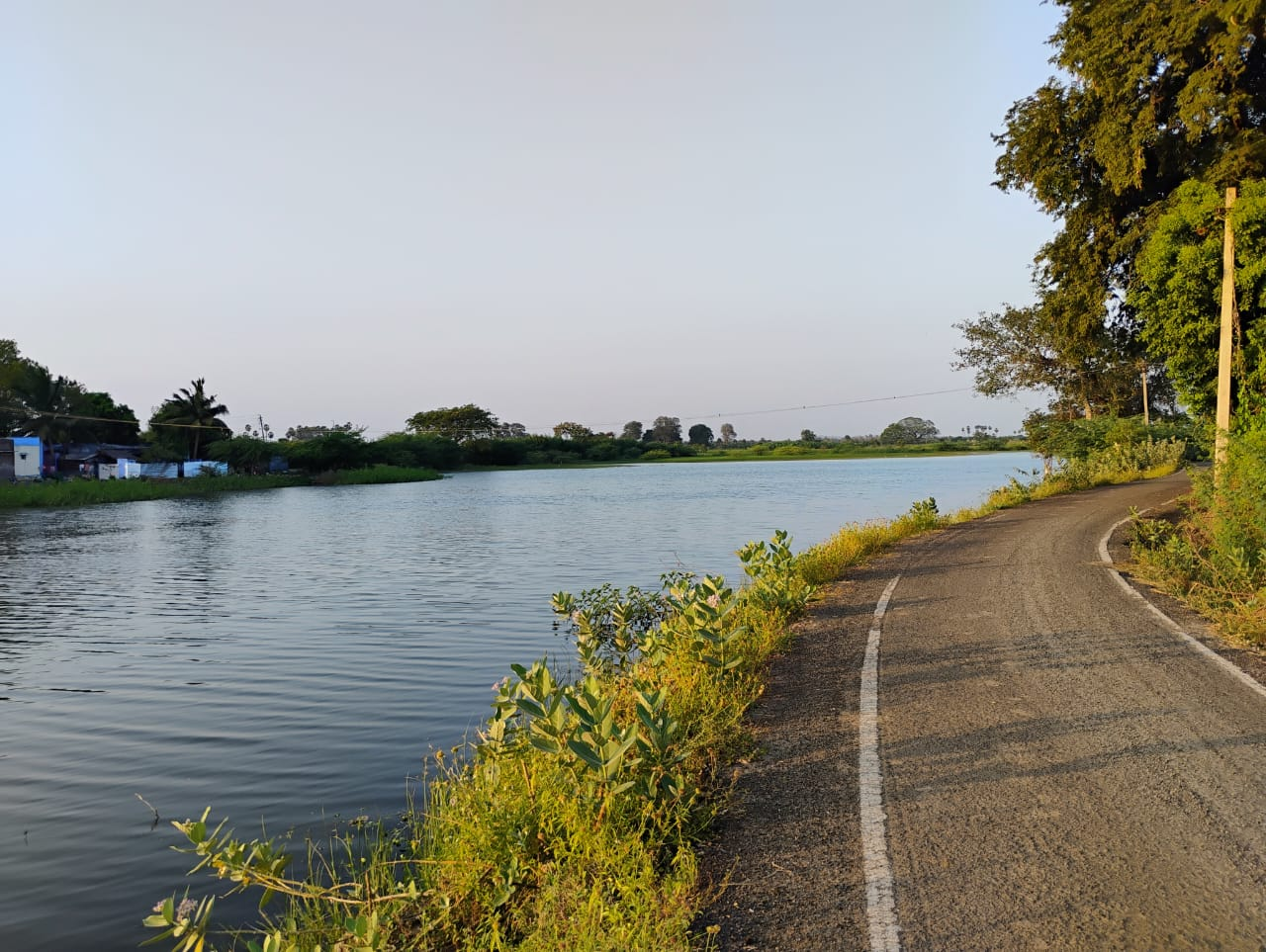
Aprikan Pool

== Etymology ==
Mukkudal means "confluence of three rivers" in Tamil. The name is derived from "mukku" meaning three and "dal" meaning river or stream. This reflects the geographical significance of the town, situated at the confluence of the Thamirabarani, Pothaiyar, and Kodumudiyar rivers.

== Geography ==
Mukkudal is situated 20 km west of Tirunelveli on the banks of the perennial river Tamirabarani.

== Demographics ==
As of 2011 India census, Mukkudal had a population of 14,983. Males constitute 49% of the population and females 51%. Mukkudal has an average literacy rate of 88.15%, higher than the state average of 80.09%: male literacy is 93.80%, and female literacy is 82.89%. In Mukkudal, 11.11% of the population is under 6 years of age. It has 4,139 houses.

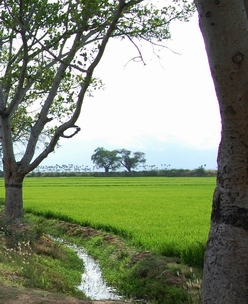
A field

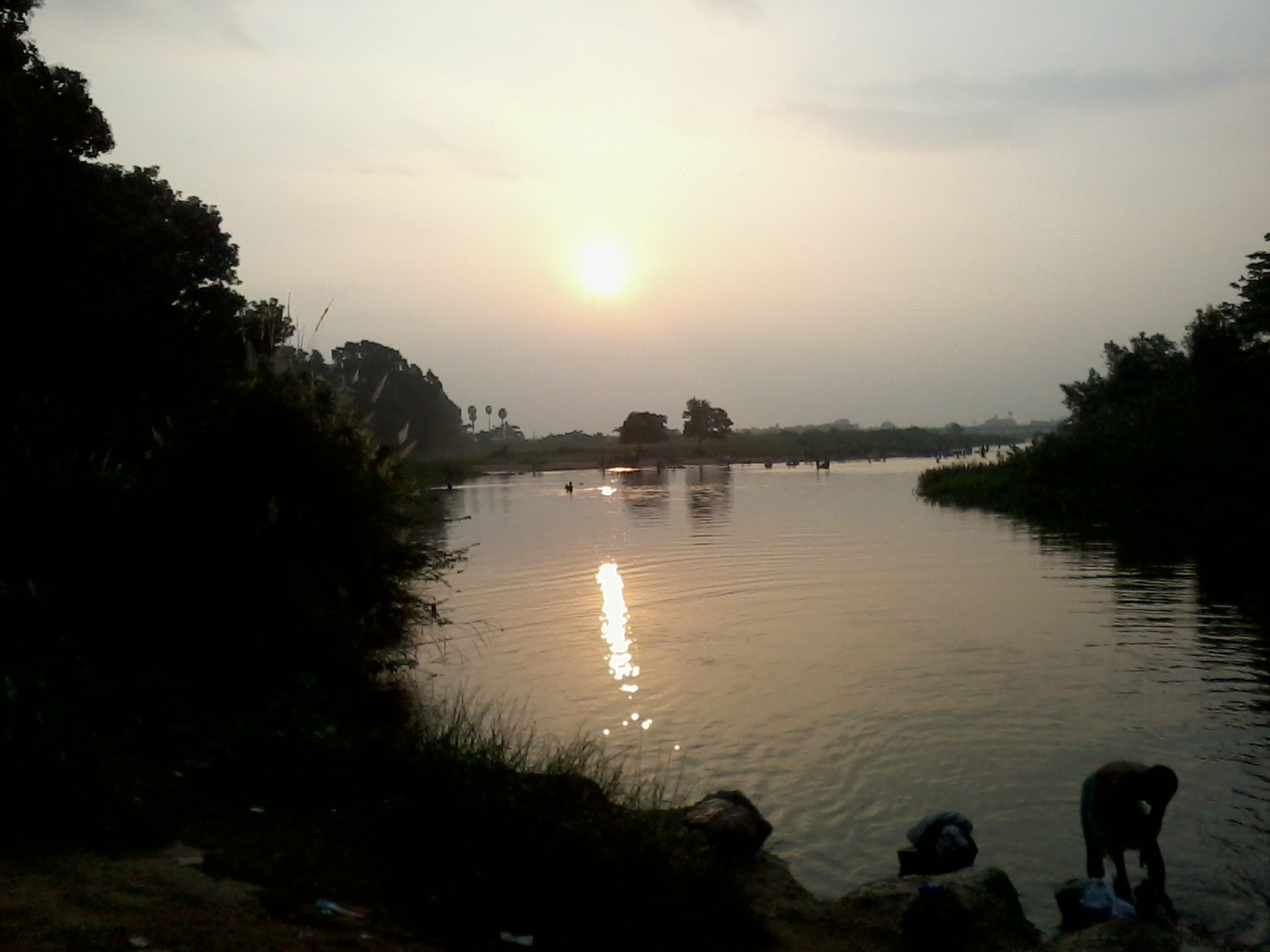
River

== Landmark ==
It has a large Muthumalai Amman Temple, the old temple Sriman Narayanaswamy Kovil and Raamaswami Kovil Temple.

== Transport ==
Mukkudal is surrounded by other villages. Villagers use Mukkudal bus stand to catch the bus. The Kadayam route bus runs on Mukkudal way. Some of the buses depart from Mukkudal to Tirunelveli. A new bus stand is opened for Mukkudal this year. Bus service is not as good as other town panchayats.

== Health ==
The major and big with advance systematic hospital that for Beedi workers. They are providing totally for free services with standard services. This hospital was started by Former Central Minister. This lies at the bus stand of Mukkudal. There is an upgraded government primary health centre.

== Education ==
Sokkalal Higher Secondary School served to educate the people for decades, a few other schools like S.S.K.V Sala Pry. School, Deepa Matriculation School and Boovijesh School and St. Paul's Higher secondary school have risen over the years.

== In popular culture ==
Mukkudal is featured in the climax of 2014 Tamil movie Aranmanai
