= Central Research Institute, Kasauli =

Indian research institute

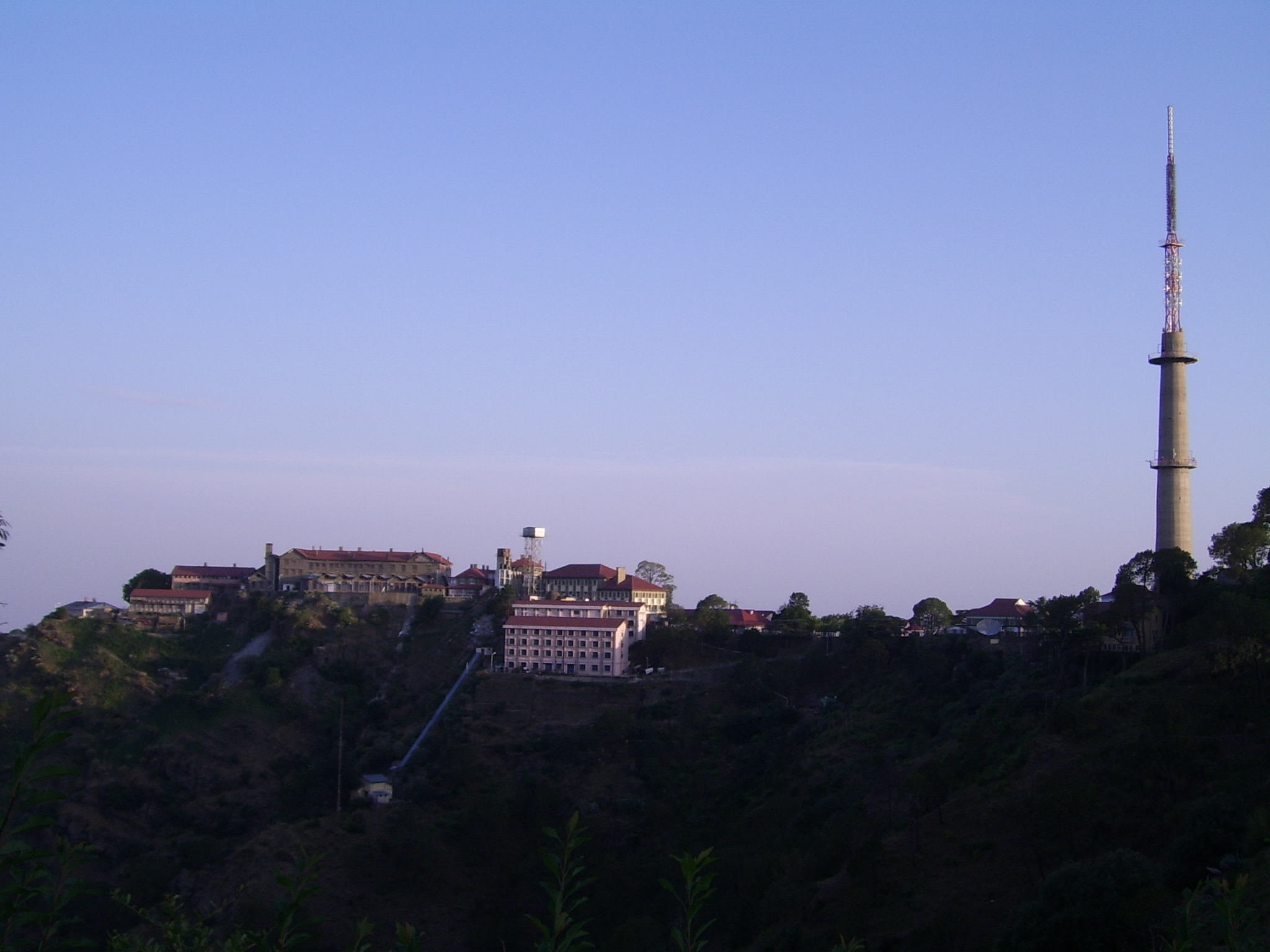
The Central Research Institute Kasauli

The Central Research Institute (CRI), Kasauli is a research institute in the Solan district of Himachal Pradesh, India. Since its inception the institute has developed into a premier institute in research in the field of immunobiology and microbiology.

Currently, the institute serves as a subordinate office of Directorate General of Health Services, under the Ministry of Health and Family Welfare of Government of India.

== History ==
CRI Kasauli was established in year 1904/5 as Pasteur Institute for India, founded by Sir David Semple. Ranbir Singh, son of Maharaja Rajinder Singh of Patiala and a member of the Imperial Legislative Council, donated his land and estates in Kasauli for the institute. It was originally established with a mandate of research work in the field of medical and public health, manufacturing of vaccines and antisera, and to act as a national referral center for public health problems. The building was reconstructed under Sir Sobha Singh.

== Teaching ==
CRI Kasauli also developed as a higher education institute after the Independence of India. In April 1961, the institute was affiliated to Panjab University for conducting BSc (Hons) and MSc (Hons) courses in the subject of Microbiology. In 1973 the Institute got affiliated to Himachal Pradesh University for conducting BSc, MSc and MPhil courses in Microbiology.

Presently, CRI Kasauli intakes 20 students for MSc (Microbiology) out of which 15 seats are filled through combined entrance test conducted by Himachal Pradesh University and 5 seats are for in-service candidates.

== See also ==
- Ministry of Health and Family Welfare
- Central Health Service (CHS)
