= Central Government Health Scheme =

Healthcare scheme for Indian government employees

- Organisation under the Ministry of Health and Family Welfare

Organisation Overview
Abbreviation	CGHS
Formed	July 1, 1954 (72 years ago)
Country	India
Parent agency	Ministry of Health and Family Welfare
Budget	₹2,370 crore (US$250 million) (2025–26)

Organisation Executive
Additional Secretary & Director General, CGHS	Roli Singh (IAS)
Joint Secretary, CGHS	Dr. Manashvi Kumar (IAS)
Director, CGHS	Dr. Satheesh Y H (CHS)

Central Government Health Scheme (CGHS) is a scheme for providing healthcare to the serving as well as the retired Central Government Employees and their family members. CGHS is functioning under the Ministry of Health and Family Welfare (MoHFW) and the officers of the Central Health Service (CHS) provide healthcare to the beneficiaries and handles the administration of the wellness centres located throughout India.

The Central Government Employees not residing in CGHS covered cities are entitled to medical care under Central Services (Medical Attendance) Rules.

== History ==
Central Government Health Scheme (CGHS) was established on 1 July 1954. It was initially introduced in Delhi as the Contributory Health Service Scheme (CHSS) under the administrative control of the Directorate General of Health Services. Initially there were 16 Dispensaries catering to 53,000 Government Employees and a total of 2,23,000 beneficiaries. Prior to CGHS, employees had to claim reimbursement of medical expenditure under Central Services (Medical Attendance) Rules. CGHS was introduced to provide a more comprehensive healthcare to the Central Government Employees and to make the system more efficient. The scheme was later extended to several other categories of officials, such as members of parliament, supreme court judges, etc.

Over the years, CGHS wellness centres were expanded to cover more and more cities throughout India.

== Organogram ==
Directorate of CGHS
AS&DG, CGHS
JS, CGHS
Director, CGHS	Director, EHS
Additional Director (HQ)	Additional DDG (HQ)
Additional Directors (4 zones of Delhi)	Additional Director MSD	Additional Director (Admin); Additional Director (R&H)	Additional Directors (outside Delhi)
Chief Medical Officers (Wellness Centres)	Chief Medical Officers (Wellness Centres)

== Beneficiaries ==
Central government employees, serving as well as retired, and their family members are eligible for CGHS benefits. The serving employees should be residing in a CGHS covered city to be eligible to subscribe to CGHS scheme. For pensioners, this is not necessary. At the time of retirement, the pensioner can choose to avail either CGHS benefits or the Fixed Medical Allowance (FMA).

CGHS also have several other categories of beneficiaries, which were added over the years, such as Members of Parliament, Judges of Supreme Court and High Courts, employees of certain autonomous organisations covered under the scheme, Railway Board employees, etc.

== Subscription ==
A subscription amount is deducted from the Pay of the Central Government Employee every month for coverage under CGHS scheme. For Pensioners, either monthly payment or a one-time lifetime payment of subscription can be chosen at the time of retirement.

Monthly Contribution for availing CGHS facility
Sl. No.	Corresponding Levels in the Pay Matrix as per 7th CPC	Contribution (₹/ Month)
1	Level 1 - 5	250
2	Level 6	450
3	Level 7 - 11	650
4	Level 12 and above	1000

== CGHS covered cities ==
Currently CGHS wellness centres are functioning in 80 cities all over India.

List of CGHS covered cities
Sl. No.	State / Union Territory	Additional Director Office	CGHS City
1	Gujarat	Ahmedabad	Ahmedabad
2	Gujarat	Ahmedabad	Vadodara
3	Gujarat	Ahmedabad	Gandhinagar
4	Karnataka	Bangalore	Bengaluru
5	Karnataka	Bangalore	Mysuru
6	Madhya Pradesh	Bhopal	Bhopal
7	Madhya Pradesh	Bhopal	Indore
8	Madhya Pradesh	Jabalpur	Jabalpur
9	Odisha	Bhubaneswar	Bhubaneswar
10	Odisha	Bhubaneswar	Berhampur
11	Odisha	Bhubaneswar	Cuttack
12	Chandigarh (UT)	Chandigarh	Chandigarh
13	Jammu & Kashmir (UT)	Chandigarh	Jammu
14	Jammu & Kashmir (UT)	Chandigarh	Srinagar
15	Himachal Pradesh	Chandigarh	Shimla
16	Haryana	Chandigarh	Ambala
17	Haryana	Chandigarh	Panchkula
18	Haryana	Chandigarh	Sonipat
19	Punjab	Chandigarh	Amritsar
20	Punjab	Chandigarh	Jalandhar
21	Tamil Nadu	Chennai	Chennai
22	Tamil Nadu	Chennai	Coimbatore
23	Tamil Nadu	Chennai	Tiruchirapalli
24	Tamil Nadu	Chennai	Tirunelveli
25	Puducherry (UT)	Chennai	Puducherry
26	Uttarakhand	Dehradun	Dehradun
27	Delhi-NCR	Delhi-NCR	Delhi-NCR (Delhi, Faridabad, Ghaziabad, Greater Noida, Noida, Gurgaon, Indirapuram, Sahibabad)
28	Assam	Guwahati	Guwahati
29	Assam	Guwahati	Dibrugarh
30	Assam	Guwahati	Silchar
31	Sikkim	Guwahati	Gangtok
32	Mizoram	Guwahati	Aizwal
33	Nagaland	Guwahati	Kohima
34	Meghalaya	Shillong	Shillong
35	Tripura	Shillong	Agartala
36	Manipur	Shillong	Imphal
37	Telangana	Hyderabad	Hyderabad
38	Andhra Pradesh	Hyderabad	Guntur
39	Andhra Pradesh	Hyderabad	Nellore
40	Andhra Pradesh	Hyderabad	Rajahmundry
41	Andhra Pradesh	Hyderabad	Vijayawada
42	Andhra Pradesh	Hyderabad	Visakhapatnam
43	Rajasthan	Jaipur	Jaipur
44	Rajasthan	Jaipur	Jodhpur
45	Rajasthan	Jaipur	Ajmer
46	Rajasthan	Jaipur	Kota
47	West Bengal	Kolkata	Kolkata (including Ishapore)
48	West Bengal	Kolkata	Siliguri (including Jalpaiguri)
49	Uttar Pradesh	Allahabad (Prayagraj)	Prayagraj
50	Uttar Pradesh	Allahabad (Prayagraj)	Varanasi
51	Uttar Pradesh	Kanpur	Kanpur
52	Uttar Pradesh	Kanpur	Gwalior
53	Uttar Pradesh	Lucknow	Lucknow
54	Uttar Pradesh	Lucknow	Agra
55	Uttar Pradesh	Lucknow	Bareily
56	Uttar Pradesh	Lucknow	Gorakhpur
57	Uttar Pradesh	Meerut	Meerut
58	Uttar Pradesh	Meerut	Saharanpur
59	Uttar Pradesh	Meerut	Moradabad
60	Uttar Pradesh	Meerut	Aligarh
61	Uttar Pradesh	Meerut	Baghpat
62	Goa	Mumbai	Panaji
63	Maharashtra	Mumbai	Mumbai
64	Maharashtra	Mumbai	Nashik
65	Maharashtra	Pune	Pune
66	Maharashtra	Pune	Chhatrapati Sambhaji Nagar (Aurangabad)
67	Maharashtra	Nagpur	Nagpur
68	Maharashtra	Nagpur	Chandrapur
69	Chhattisgarh	Nagpur	Raipur
70	Bihar	Patna	Patna
71	Bihar	Patna	Darbhanga
72	Bihar	Patna	Gaya
73	Bihar	Patna	Chhapra
74	Bihar	Patna	Muzaffarpur
75	Jharkhand	Ranchi	Ranchi
76	Jharkhand	Ranchi	Dhanbad
77	Kerala	Thiruvananthapuram	Trivandrum
78	Kerala	Thiruvananthapuram	Kozhikode
79	Kerala	Thiruvananthapuram	Kochi
80	Kerala	Thiruvananthapuram	Kannur

== Functioning of the Wellness Centres ==
CGHS Overview
Details	Total Number	
Covered Cities	81	
Wellness Centres	Allopathic	342
Wellness Centres	AYUSH	113
Wellness Centres	Poly-Clinics	19
Primary Card Holders	16,67,777	
Beneficiaries	46,86,949	
Medical Officers (sanctioned strength)	1539	
Doctor to Beneficiary Ratio	1:3045	

The Wellness Centres are headed by Chief Medical Officer (CMO) in-charge and functions from Monday to Saturday 7:30 AM to 2:00 PM. The staff pattern is as per Staff Inspection Unit (SIU) norms based on workload, and a Medical Officer is expected to attend to 75 patients in 6 hours.

=== Human resources ===
The Medical Officers are recruited by the CHS Division of the Ministry of Health and Family Welfare through UPSC Combined Medical Services Examination.

Recruitment to other posts are through an "Integrated Recruitment System" where the CGHS organisation is divided into 9 zones in conformation with the regional offices of the Staff Selection Commission.

== Services and benefits ==
Through the wellness centres located at several cities across India, the beneficiaries can avail medical consultations and are provided medicines free of cost. Total number of beneficiaries are 47.44 lakhs. The beneficiaries requiring expert evaluation and hospitalisation are referred to hospitals known as Healthcare Organizations (HCOs) empaneled under CGHS. A total of 2486 private hospitals and diagnostic centres are empanelled under CGHS. In addition to Modern Medicine, the beneficiaries can also avail healthcare under Indian Systems of Medicine, such as Ayurveda, Unani, Sidha, Yoga and also Homeopathy.

Serving employees of the Ministry of Health and Family Welfare, Pensioners, Members of Parliament, etc., are eligible for cashless treatment at the empaneled hospitals.

== Challenges and reforms ==
The Department-Related Parliamentary Standing Committee on Health and Family Welfare noted in its report that a significant number of posts are vacant in CGHS Organisation to the tune of 2,023 positions (28.81% of sanctioned strength) and may lead to an undesirable doctor to beneficiaries ratio, increased patient waiting time and reduced quality of care. The Committee also noted that around 26% of the Wellness Centres are located in Delhi NCR region and the uneven distribution of these wellness centres in the nation restricts the accessibility of the beneficiaries to CGHS Services.

== See also ==
- Central Health Service
- Ministry of Health and Family Welfare
