= Ministry of Labour and Employment (India) =

Government ministry of India

- Branch of Government of India

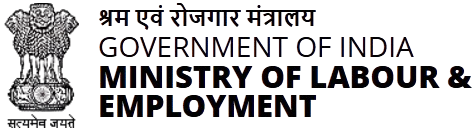
- Ministry of Labour and Employment

Agency overview
- Jurisdiction: Government of India
- Headquarters: Rafi Marg, New Delhi
- Annual budget: 1.5 Billion USD or ₹13,221.73 crore (2023–24 est.)
- Ministers responsible: Mansukh Mandaviya, Cabinet Minister; Shobha Karandlaje, Minister of State
- Agency executive: Chandra Bhushan Kumar, IAS
- Website: labour.gov.in

The Ministry of Labour & Employment is one of the oldest and most important Ministries of the Government of India.This is an India's federal ministry which is responsible for enforcement of labour laws in general and legislations related to a worker's social security. The Ministry aims to create a healthy work environment for higher production and productivity and to develop and coordinate vocational skill training and employment. However, Skill Development responsibilities, such as Industrial Training and Apprenticeship responsibilities were transferred to the Ministry of Skill Development and Entrepreneurship from 9 November 2014. The Ministry launched the National Career Service portal on 20 July 2015 to help bridge the gap between job providers and job seekers. Jagjivan Ram was the first Labour Minister of independent India, serving in Prime Minister Jawaharlal Nehru's cabinet from 1947 to 1952.

== Role and Working ==
=== Functions ===
The thrust areas of the ministry are:

- Labour Policy and legislation
- Safety, health and welfare of labour
- Social security of labour
- Policy relating to special target groups such as women and child labour
- Industrial relations and enforcement of labour laws in the Central sphere
- Adjudication of industrial disputes through Central Government Industrial Tribunals cum Labour Courts and National Industrial Tribunals
- Workers' Education
- Labour and Employment Statistics

The results of recession on employment in the eight selected sectors textiles including apparels, leather, metals, automobiles, gems & jewellery, transport, IT/BPO and handloom / powerloom were monitored starting from Oct–Dec 2008. The overall employment in the eight selected sectors covered in the quarterly surveys has increased by 10.66 lakh (0.16%). In IT/BPO sector the increase in the employment is maximum (6.9 lakh) during the year 2009–10.

- Emigration of Labour for employment abroad
- Employment services and vocational training
- Administration of Central Labour & Employment Services
- International co-operation in labour and employment matters
- The ministry of Labor and Employment Govt. Of India has Introduce E-Shram Card For UN- organize Sector Employees Social And Economical improvement During The COVID-19 Pandemic Session on 1 August 2021.

== Divisions and Sections ==
- Organisation and Method Section with RTI Work
- Administration Division
- Budget and Accounts Division
- CLS-II(CGIT-cum-LCs/NITs) Affairs Division
- Central Labour Service Section
- Central Labour Service (Vigilance) Section
- Chief Controller of Accounts Division
- Section dealing with Child, Bonded and Women Labour
- Coordination Division
- Directorate General Labour Welfare
- Economic and Statistical Analysis Section
- Finance Division
- Industrial Relations Section
- Industrial Safety and Health Section
- Section dealing with deputation for International Labour Conference of the International Labour Organisation (ILO)
- Labour Documents and Reference Centre
- Media Cell
- Parliament Unit
- RTI & Legal Cell
- Monitoring & Evaluation Unit
- Public Grievances Cell
- Result Framework Documents Cell
- Vigilance Cell
- Social Security Cell
- Wage Boards Management Section
- Wage Cell

== Organisations ==
=== Attached offices ===
- Directorate General of Employment
- Office of the Chief Labour Commissioner (CLC)(Central)
- Directorate General Factory Advice Service and Labour Institute (DGFASLI)
- Labour Bureau

=== Subordinate offices ===
- Directorate General of Mines Safety (DGMS)
- Labour Welfare Organisations (LWOs)
- Indian Labour Archives (ILA)

=== Statutory/Autonomous Organisations ===
- Employees State Insurance Corporation (ESIC)
- Employees Provident Fund Organisation (EPFO)
- V. V. Giri National Labour Institute (VVGNLI)

=== Autonomous bodies ===
- Central Government Industrial Tribunals and Labour Courts
- Central Labour Institute
- Pandit Deendayal Upadhyay National Academy of Social Security(PDNASS)
- Dattopant Thengadi National Board for Workers Education and Development(DTNBWED)

== Cabinet Ministers ==
- Note: I/C – Independent Charge
- Key: ^{†} Died in office

Portrait	Minister (Birth-Death) Constituency	Term of office			Political party	Ministry	Prime Minister
Portrait	Minister (Birth-Death) Constituency	From	To	Period	Political party	Ministry	Prime Minister
Minister of Labour
	Jagjivan Ram (1908–1986); MCA for Bihar	15 August 1947	13 May 1952	4 years, 272 days	Indian National Congress	Nehru I	Jawaharlal Nehru
	V. V. Giri (1894–1980); MP for Pathapatnam	13 May 1952	7 September 1954	2 years, 117 days	Indian National Congress	Nehru II	Jawaharlal Nehru
	Khandubhai Kasanji Desai (1898–1975); MP for Mehsana West	10 September 1954	16 April 1957	2 years, 218 days	Indian National Congress	Nehru II	Jawaharlal Nehru
Minister of Labour and Employment
	Gulzarilal Nanda (1898–1998); MP for Sabarkantha	17 April 1957	10 April 1962	4 years, 358 days	Indian National Congress	Nehru III	Jawaharlal Nehru
	Jaisukhlal Hathi (1909–1982); MP for Gujarat (Rajya Sabha) (Minister of State)	16 April 1962	15 November 1962	213 days	Indian National Congress	Nehru IV	Jawaharlal Nehru
	Gulzarilal Nanda (1898–1998); MP for Sabarkantha	1 September 1963	24 January 1964	145 days	Indian National Congress	Nehru IV	Jawaharlal Nehru
	Damodaram Sanjivayya (1921–1972); MP for Andhra Pradesh (Rajya Sabha)	24 January 1964	27 May 1964	2 years, 0 days	Indian National Congress	Nehru IV	Jawaharlal Nehru
	Damodaram Sanjivayya (1921–1972); MP for Andhra Pradesh (Rajya Sabha)	27 May 1964	9 June 1964	2 years, 0 days	Indian National Congress	Nanda I	Gulzarilal Nanda
	Damodaram Sanjivayya (1921–1972); MP for Andhra Pradesh (Rajya Sabha)	9 June 1964	11 January 1966	2 years, 0 days	Indian National Congress	Shastri	Lal Bahadur Shastri
	Damodaram Sanjivayya (1921–1972); MP for Andhra Pradesh (Rajya Sabha)	11 January 1966	24 January 1966	2 years, 0 days	Indian National Congress	Nanda II	Gulzarilal Nanda
Minister of Labour, Employment and Rehabilitation
	Jagjivan Ram (1908–1986); MP for Sasaram	24 January 1966	13 March 1967	1 year, 48 days	Indian National Congress	Indira I	Indira Gandhi
	Jaisukhlal Hathi (1909–1982); MP for Gujarat (Rajya Sabha)	13 March 1967	15 November 1969	2 years, 247 days	Indian National Congress	Indira II	Indira Gandhi
	Jagjivan Ram (1908–1986); MP for Sasaram	15 November 1969	18 February 1970	95 days	Indian National Congress (R)	Indira II	Indira Gandhi
Minister of Labour and Rehabilitation
	Damodaram Sanjivayya (1921–1972); MP for Andhra Pradesh (Rajya Sabha)	18 February 1970	18 March 1971	1 year, 28 days	Indian National Congress (R)	Indira II	Indira Gandhi
	Raghunath Keshav Khadilkar (1905–1979); MP for Baramati (Minister of State)	18 March 1971	5 February 1973	1 year, 324 days	Indian National Congress (R)	Indira III	Indira Gandhi
	K. V. Raghunatha Reddy (1924–2002); MP for Andhra Pradesh (Rajya Sabha) (Minister of State)	5 February 1973	9 November 1973	273 days	Indian National Congress (R)	Indira III	Indira Gandhi
Minister of Labour
	K. V. Raghunatha Reddy (1924–2002); MP for Andhra Pradesh (Rajya Sabha) (Minister of State)	9 November 1973	24 March 1977	3 years, 135 days	Indian National Congress (R)	Indira III	Indira Gandhi
	Ravindra Varma (1925–2006); MP for Ranchi	26 March 1977	28 July 1979	2 years, 124 days	Janata Party	Desai	Morarji Desai
	Fazlur Rahman; MP for Bettiah	30 July 1979	14 January 1980	168 days	Janata Party (Secular)	Charan	Charan Singh
	Janaki Ballabh Patnaik (1927–2015); MP for Cuttack	16 January 1980	7 June 1980	143 days	Indian National Congress	Indira IV	Indira Gandhi
	Indira Gandhi (1917–1984); MP for Medak (Prime Minister)	8 June 1980	19 October 1981	1 year, 133 days	Indian National Congress	Indira IV	Indira Gandhi
	N. D. Tiwari (1925–2018); MP for Nainital	19 October 1980	15 January 1982	1 year, 88 days	Indian National Congress	Indira IV	Indira Gandhi
	Bhagwat Jha Azad (1922–2011); MP for Bhagalpur (Minister of State, I/C)	15 January 1982	2 September 1982	230 days	Indian National Congress	Indira IV	Indira Gandhi
Minister of Labour and Rehabilitation
	Veerendra Patil (1924–1997); MP for Bagalkot	2 September 1982	31 October 1984	2 years, 115 days	Indian National Congress	Indira IV	Indira Gandhi
	Veerendra Patil (1924–1997); MP for Bagalkot	4 November 1984	31 December 1984	2 years, 115 days	Indian National Congress	Rajiv I	Rajiv Gandhi
Minister of Labour
	Tanguturi Anjaiah (1919–1986); MP for Secunderabad (Minister of State, I/C)	31 December 1984	20 January 1986	1 year, 20 days	Indian National Congress (I)	Rajiv II	Rajiv Gandhi
	P. A. Sangma (1947–2016); MP for Tura (Minister of State, I/C)	20 September 1986	6 February 1988	1 year, 139 days	Indian National Congress (I)	Rajiv II	Rajiv Gandhi
	Makhan Lal Fotedar (1932–2017); MP for Uttar Pradesh (Rajya Sabha)	6 February 1988	14 February 1988	8 days	Indian National Congress (I)	Rajiv II	Rajiv Gandhi
	Jagdish Tytler (born 1944); MP for Delhi Sadar (Minister of State, I/C)	14 February 1988	25 June 1988	132 days	Indian National Congress (I)	Rajiv II	Rajiv Gandhi
	Bindeshwari Dubey (1921–1993); MP for Bihar (Rajya Sabha)	25 June 1988	2 December 1989	1 year, 160 days	Indian National Congress (I)	Rajiv II	Rajiv Gandhi
	Ram Vilas Paswan (1946–2020); MP for Hajipur	6 December 1989	10 November 1990	339 days	Janata Dal	Vishwanath	Vishwanath Pratap Singh
	Chandra Shekhar (1927–2007); MP for Ballia (Prime Minister)	21 November 1990	21 June 1991	212 days	Samajwadi Janata Party (Rashtriya)	Chandra Shekhar	Chandra Shekhar
	Vazhappady K. Ramamurthy (1940–2002); MP for Krishnagiri (Minister of State, I/C)	21 June 1991	30 July 1991	39 days	Indian National Congress (I)	Rao	P. V. Narasimha Rao
	P. V. Narasimha Rao (1921–2004); MP for Nandyal (Prime Minister)	30 July 1991	10 July 1992	346 days	Indian National Congress (I)	Rao	P. V. Narasimha Rao
	P. A. Sangma (1947–2016); MP for Tura (Minister of State, I/C until 10 Feb 1995)	10 July 1992	15 September 1995	3 years, 67 days	Indian National Congress (I)	Rao	P. V. Narasimha Rao
	G. Venkatswamy (1929–2014); MP for Peddapalli	15 September 1995	16 May 1996	244 days	Indian National Congress (I)	Rao	P. V. Narasimha Rao
	Atal Bihari Vajpayee (1924–2018); MP for Lucknow (Prime Minister)	16 May 1996	1 June 1996	16 days	Bharatiya Janata Party	Vajpayee I	Atal Bihari Vajpayee
	Balwant Singh Ramoowalia (born 1942); MP for Uttar Pradesh (Rajya Sabha)	1 June 1996	29 June 1996	28 days	Independent	Deve Gowda	H. D. Deve Gowda
	M. Arunachalam (1944–2004); MP for Tenkasi	29 June 1996	21 April 1997	296 days	Tamil Maanila Congress (Moopanar)	Deve Gowda	H. D. Deve Gowda
	Inder Kumar Gujral (1919–2012); MP for Bihar (Rajya Sabha) (Prime Minister)	21 April 1997	1 May 1997	10 days	Janata Dal	Gujral	Inder Kumar Gujral
	M. Arunachalam (1944–2004); MP for Tenkasi	1 May 1997	9 June 1997	39 days	Tamil Maanila Congress (Moopanar)	Gujral	Inder Kumar Gujral
	M. P. Veerendra Kumar (1936–2020); MP for Kozhikode (Minister of State, I/C)	9 June 1997	19 March 1998	283 days	Janata Dal	Gujral	Inder Kumar Gujral
	Satyanarayan Jatiya (born 1946); MP for Ujjain	19 March 1998	13 October 1999	1 year, 208 days	Bharatiya Janata Party	Vajpayee II	Atal Bihari Vajpayee
	Atal Bihari Vajpayee (1924–2018); MP for Lucknow (Prime Minister)	13 October 1999	22 November 1999	40 days	Bharatiya Janata Party	Vajpayee III	Atal Bihari Vajpayee
	Satyanarayan Jatiya (born 1946); MP for Ujjain	22 November 1999	1 September 2001	1 year, 283 days	Bharatiya Janata Party	Vajpayee III	Atal Bihari Vajpayee
	Sharad Yadav (1947–2023); MP for Madhepura	1 September 2001	1 July 2002	303 days	Janata Dal (United)	Vajpayee III	Atal Bihari Vajpayee
	Sahib Singh Verma (1943–2007); MP for Outer Delhi	1 July 2002	22 May 2004	1 year, 326 days	Bharatiya Janata Party	Vajpayee III	Atal Bihari Vajpayee
Minister of Labour and Employment
	Sis Ram Ola (1927–2013); MP for Jhunjhunu	23 May 2004	27 November 2004	188 days	Indian National Congress	Manmohan I	Manmohan Singh
	K. Chandrashekar Rao (born 1954); MP for Karimnagar	27 November 2004	24 August 2006	1 year, 270 days	Telangana Rashtra Samithi	Manmohan I	Manmohan Singh
	Manmohan Singh (born 1932); MP for Assam (Rajya Sabha) (Prime Minister)	24 August 2006	24 October 2006	61 days	Indian National Congress	Manmohan I	Manmohan Singh
	Oscar Fernandes (1941–2021); MP for Karnataka (Rajya Sabha) (Minister of State, I/C)	24 October 2006	3 March 2009	2 years, 130 days	Indian National Congress	Manmohan I	Manmohan Singh
	G. K. Vasan (born 1964); MP for Tamil Nadu (Rajya Sabha) (Minister of State, I/C)	3 March 2009	22 May 2009	80 days	Indian National Congress	Manmohan I	Manmohan Singh
	Mallikarjun Kharge (born 1942); MP for Gulbarga	28 May 2009	17 June 2013	4 years, 20 days	Indian National Congress	Manmohan II	Manmohan Singh
	Sis Ram Ola (1927–2013); MP for Jhunjhunu	17 June 2013	15 December 2013^{[†]}	181 days	Indian National Congress	Manmohan II	Manmohan Singh
	Oscar Fernandes (1941–2021); MP for Karnataka (Rajya Sabha)	15 December 2013	26 May 2014	162 days	Indian National Congress	Manmohan II	Manmohan Singh
	Narendra Singh Tomar (born 1957); MP for Gwalior	27 May 2014	9 November 2014	166 days	Bharatiya Janata Party	Modi I	Narendra Modi
	Bandaru Dattatreya (born 1947); MP for Secunderabad (Minister of State, I/C)	9 November 2014	3 September 2017	2 years, 298 days	Bharatiya Janata Party	Modi I	Narendra Modi
	Santosh Kumar Gangwar (born 1948); MP for Bareilly (Minister of State, I/C)	3 September 2017	30 May 2019	3 years, 307 days	Bharatiya Janata Party	Modi I	Narendra Modi
	Santosh Kumar Gangwar (born 1948); MP for Bareilly (Minister of State, I/C)	31 May 2019	7 July 2021	3 years, 307 days	Bharatiya Janata Party	Modi II	Narendra Modi
	Bhupender Yadav (born 1969); MP for Rajasthan (Rajya Sabha)	7 July 2021	9 June 2024	2 years, 338 days	Bharatiya Janata Party	Modi II	Narendra Modi
	Mansukh Mandaviya (born 1972); MP for Porbandar	10 June 2024	Incumbent	2 years, 107 days	Bharatiya Janata Party	Modi III	Narendra Modi

== Ministers of State ==
Portrait	Minister (Birth-Death) Constituency	Term of office			Political party	Ministry	Prime Minister
Portrait	Minister (Birth-Death) Constituency	From	To	Period	Political party	Ministry	Prime Minister
Minister of State of Labour and Employment
	Jaisukhlal Hathi (1909–1982); MP for Gujarat (Rajya Sabha)	4 September 1963	24 January 1964	142 days	Indian National Congress	Nehru IV	Jawaharlal Nehru
	Kotha Raghuramaiah (1912–1979); MP for Guntur	9 June 1964	13 June 1964	4 days	Indian National Congress	Shastri	Lal Bahadur Shastri
Minister of State of Labour, Employment and Rehabilitation
	Jagannath Rao (1909–?); MP for Chatrapur	24 January 1966	14 February 1966	21 days	Indian National Congress	Indira I	Indira Gandhi
	Lalit Narayan Mishra (1923–1975); MP for Bihar (Rajya Sabha)	13 March 1967	14 November 1967	246 days	Indian National Congress	Indira II	Indira Gandhi
	Bhagwat Jha Azad (1922–2011); MP for Bhagalpur	14 February 1969	18 March 1971	2 years, 32 days	Indian National Congress (R)	Indira II	Indira Gandhi
Minister of State of Labour
	Larang Sai (1935–2004); MP for Sarguja	14 August 1977	28 July 1979	1 year, 348 days	Janata Party	Desai	Morarji Desai
	Ram Kripal Sinha (1934–2023); MP for Bihar (Rajya Sabha)	14 August 1977	28 July 1979	1 year, 348 days	Janata Party	Desai	Morarji Desai
	T. Anjaiah (1919–1986); MP for Secunderabad	8 June 1980	11 October 1980	125 days	Indian National Congress	Indira IV	Indira Gandhi
	Ram Dulari Sinha (1922–1994); MP for Sheohar	19 October 1980	15 January 1982	1 year, 88 days	Indian National Congress	Indira IV	Indira Gandhi
Minister of State of Labour and Rehabilitation
	Mohsina Kidwai (born 1932); MP for Meerut	11 September 1982	29 January 1983	140 days	Indian National Congress	Indira IV	Indira Gandhi
	Dharmavir; MP for Uttar Pradesh (Rajya Sabha)	29 January 1983	31 October 1984	1 year, 323 days	Indian National Congress	Indira IV	Indira Gandhi
	Dharmavir; MP for Uttar Pradesh (Rajya Sabha)	4 November 1984	22 December 1984	1 year, 323 days	Indian National Congress	Rajiv I	Rajiv Gandhi
Minister of State of Labour
	Radhakishan Malviya (1943–2013); MP for Madhya Pradesh (Rajya Sabha)	4 July 1989	2 December 1989	151 days	Indian National Congress	Rajiv II	Rajiv Gandhi
	Ram Ji Lal Suman (born 1950); MP for Firozabad	21 November 1990	21 June 1991	212 days	Samajwadi Janata Party (Rashtriya)	Chandra Shekhar	Chandra Shekhar
	Muni Lall (1938–2019); MP for Sasaram	13 October 1999	1 July 2002	2 years, 261 days	Bharatiya Janata Party	Vajpayee III	Atal Bihari Vajpayee
	Ashok Kumar Pradhan (born 1953); MP for Khurja	1 July 2002	29 January 2003	212 days	Bharatiya Janata Party	Vajpayee III	Atal Bihari Vajpayee
	Vijay Goel (born 1954); MP for Chandni Chowk	29 January 2003	24 May 2003	115 days	Bharatiya Janata Party	Vajpayee III	Atal Bihari Vajpayee
	Santosh Kumar Gangwar (born 1948); MP for Bareilly	24 May 2003	8 September 2003	107 days	Bharatiya Janata Party	Vajpayee III	Atal Bihari Vajpayee
Minister of State of Labour and Employment
	Chandra Sekhar Sahu (born 1950); MP for Berhampur	29 January 2006	24 October 2006	268 days	Indian National Congress	Manmohan I	Manmohan Singh
	Harish Rawat (born 1948); MP for Haridwar	28 May 2009	19 January 2011	1 year, 236 days	Indian National Congress	Manmohan II	Manmohan Singh
	Kodikunnil Suresh (born 1962); MP for Mavelikara	28 October 2012	26 May 2014	1 year, 210 days	Indian National Congress	Manmohan II	Manmohan Singh
	Vishnu Deo Sai (born 1964); MP for Raigarh	27 May 2014	9 November 2014	166 days	Bharatiya Janata Party	Modi I	Narendra Modi
	Rameswar Teli (born 1970); MP for Dibrugarh	7 July 2021	9 June 2024	2 years, 338 days	Bharatiya Janata Party	Modi II	Narendra Modi
	Shobha Karandlaje (born 1966); MP for Bangalore North	10 June 2024	Incumbent	2 years, 107 days	Bharatiya Janata Party	Modi III	Narendra Modi

== See also ==
- Central Labour Service (CLS)
- Occupational Safety, Health and Working Conditions Code, 2020
