= Barajamda =

- Census town
- Nickname: Jamda
- Location in Jharkhand, India Barajamda (India)
- Coordinates: 22.16469°N 85.43638°E
- Country: India
- State: Jharkhand
- District: Pashchimi Singhbhum

Population (2001)
  - Total: 7,691

Languages
  - Official: Hindi, Ho, Santali
- Time zone: UTC+5:30 (IST)
- Postal code: 833221
- Telephone code: 06596
- Vehicle registration: JH

Barajamda is a census town in Pashchimi Singhbhum district in the state of Jharkhand, India.

== Etymology ==
The word Barajamda, meaning "forest region," applies to a forested mountainous plateau region in eastern India. The existence of Barajamda dates at least to the sixteenth century.

== Demographics ==
As of 2001 India census, Barajamda had a population of 50,590. Males constitute 52% of the population and females 48%. Barajamda has an average literacy rate of 52%, lower than the national average of 59.5%; with 62% of the males and 38% of females literate. 17% of the population is under 6 years of age.

== Economy ==
Barajamda is fairly known for its mining prospects, its climatic conditions and its booming steel industry. There are a number of renowned companies present here: 1) Jindal mines 2) Taurian 3) Sail 4) Sesa goa 5) Essel mining 6) R J Mills Ltd 7) Maa Kali Telecom, Bara Jamda 8) Suraj Copier & Internet Cafe, Barajamda There are more than 100 mines and 200 crushers. 1) Shree treveni Minerals 2) M J M minerals Pvt Ltd 3) Jagdish ore Pvt Ltd 4) Shree Balajee Minerals 5) Ja mata Dee Crushers 6) Jai Maa Tara Minerals (p) Ltd. 7) Gupta Mobile Shop & Business Point Cyber Cafe MMTC, Minerals and Metals Trading Corporation is a Government of India Ltd. It is an enterprise that is responsible for the transport of minerals to the international market. It acts as an interface between those mines and the Iron and Steel Industry.

This area is mineral rich - surrounded by iron ore and Manganese ore mines. Maximum mines are in forest area. It is about 20 km from Kiriburu and Meghahatuburu. In local language - Kiriburu means land of Elephants and Meghahatuburu means land of clouds. Bokaro steel plant takes iron ore from Barajamda in Singhbhum and from orissa.

== Transport ==
Barajamda may be reached by train from Kolkata / Tatanagar and /or by bus from Bhubaneshwar / Tatanagar / Ranchi (Via Chaibasa). At present, Roads are under Construction and it is advisable to go by Train. Connected by Air (Nearest Airport Barbil abt 7 km). Barajamda is a station on the Tatanagar–Barbil section of Howrah- Tatanagar- Barbil line. Currently there is only one train available from Howrah Junction. Train Name = 12021/12022 Howrah Barbil Jan Shatabdi Express
