= National Scholarship Portal =

Online portal by the Government of India

- NSP logo
- Website type: Public
- Available in: Hindi, English
- Country of origin: India
- Area served: Pan India
- Owners: Ministry of Electronics and Information Technology, Government of India
- Services: Scholarship and fee reimbursement
- Website: scholarships.gov.in
- Registration: Required
- Launched: 2016
- Current status: Active

The National Scholarship Portal (NSP) is an online portal by the Government of India for applying, processing, verifying and sanction of Government scholarships to students. It aims to reduce discrepancies and provide a common, effective and transparent way to disburse scholarships to students. It aims to be a "one stop" portal for Indian students applying for scholarships by bringing together hundreds of scholarships run by both states and the central government. The portal is a part of the government's Digital India initiative and the National e-Governance Plan.

== History ==
In 2016 Government of India launched National Scholarship portal.

and in 2018, the Indian government launched the National Scholarship Portal mobile app to allow poor and rural students to access the portal. It was developed by the Ministry of Minority Affairs.

The full web-based portal launched in 2020.

In 2022, the portal was criticized for failing to verify the scholarship applications of over 1,000 girls from Gujarat, leading to them being denied a scholarship.

== Funding ==
The portal distributes funds through the Direct Benefit Transfer system.
