= Vardhman Mahavir Medical College =

Medical college in New Delhi, India

Coordinates: 28.568974°N 77.203071°E

Vardhman Mahavir Medical College and Safdarjung Hospital
- Motto: In the Service of Humanity
- Type: Ministry of Health & Family Welfare, Government of India
- Established: November 2001; 25 years ago
- Accreditation: National Medical Commission
- Academic affiliations: Guru Gobind Singh Indraprastha University
- Budget: ₹2,179.58 crore (US$230 million) (2025–26)
- Principal: Dr. Geetika Khanna
- Director: Dr. Kavita Rani Sharma
- Faculty: 402
- Undergraduates: 843
- Postgraduates: 938
- Location: New Delhi, Delhi, India
- Campus: 47 acres (19 ha); Urban
- Website: vmmc-sjh.mohfw.gov.in

Vardhman Mahavir Medical College (VMMC) is a medical college in New Delhi. It is attached with the famous Safdarjang Hospital for clinical teaching. The college runs under the umbrella of Guru Gobind Singh Indraprastha University.

Vardhman Mahavir Medical College was established at Safdarjung Hospital (one of the largest hospitals in India, started during the Second World War) in November 2001.

== History ==
The Inauguration of the college was done by the then Honourable Prime Minister Atal Bihari Vajpayee on 17 December 2001, in presence of Lal Krishna Advani (Home Minister), C. P. Thakur (Minister of Health and Family Welfare) and founder Principal Dr. Jagdish Prasad. Subsequently, Prof. Jayashree Bhattacharya and Prof. N. N. Mathur served as the Principals of the college. Within few years of its existence, the college has become a preferred destination for students to seek admission. The first batch of MBBS students joined the college in February 2002. More than fifteen batches have joined since. The college has recognition by the NMC. It is included in the World Directory of Medical Schools and the Avicenna Directory of Medicine.

== Affiliation ==
The college is affiliated to Guru Gobind Singh Indraprastha University, Delhi and is funded by Government of India. From 2008, the postgraduate courses have been affiliated to GGSIPU which were with Delhi University.

== Rankings ==
University and college rankings

Medical – India
- NIRF (2024): 17
- India Today (2024): 7

The National Institutional Ranking Framework (NIRF) ranked the college 17th in its medical ranking 2024. The college was ranked 7th among medical colleges in India in 2024 by India Today.

== Infrastructure ==
The college began on infrastructure carved out of the portions of the Safdarjang Hospital. The college has a separate library building with an excellent collection of medical books and journals, and Internet facility. The college has a faculty in the pre-clinical, para-clinical and clinical disciplines.

== College festival ==
Nirvana is the official annual literary, socio-cultural and sports festival of Vardhaman Mahavir Medical College and Safdarjang Hospital, New Delhi. It first started in 2004. Celebrities like the band Indian Ocean and Toshi Sabri have performed for a crowd that consisted of medical students from across the country as well as non-medical students and invitees from colleges affiliated to the Delhi University, Jawaharlal Nehru University and others, i.e., over 300 institutes.
