= Safdarjung Hospital =

Government Hospital in Delhi, India

Geography
- Location: Ring Road, Delhi, India

Organisation
- Type: Government teaching hospital
- Affiliated university: Vardhman Mahavir Medical College

History
- Former name: Willingdon Hospital (1939–1945)
- Founded: 1942; 84 years ago

Safdarjung Hospital is a multi-specialty hospital in Delhi, India. It is the largest central government hospital in India measured by bed capacity. It is affiliated with Vardhman Mahavir Medical College. It is located on the Ring Road, opposite to the AIIMS New Delhi.

== History ==
Until the inception of All India Institute of Medical Science in 1956, Safdarjung Hospital was the only tertiary care hospital in Delhi. In 1962, it became a centre of training and teaching for post-graduate students of the University of Delhi. From 1973 to 1990, the hospital and its faculty was associated with University College of Medical Sciences. But with the establishment of Indraprastha University in 1998, the hospital was later merged with the Vardhman Mahavir Medical College.

== Academics ==
The courses offered by the institute are:

- M.B.B.S. (Annual intake of 170 students)
- MD/MS
- DM/M.Ch.

DNB

- BSc (Hons.) in Nursing (Annual intake of 70 students in BSc Nursing)

== Medical facilities ==
- Anatomy
- Anesthesiology
- Anti Retroviral Treatment (ART) for HIV & AIDS treatment
- Biochemistry Clinical (SJH)
- Blood Bank and transfusion and Pathology
- Biochemistry (VMMC)
- Burns and Plastic
- Cardiac Surgery – CTVS
- Cardiology
- Central Institute of Orthopaedics (CIO)
- Community Medicine
- College of Nursing
- Cancer surgery
- Dental Surgery
- Dermatology
- ENT
- Endocrinology
- Forensic Medicine
- Haematology
- Homeopathy
- General Medicine
- General Surgery
- Maxillo-Facial Surgery
- Medical Oncology
- Microbiology
- Neurology
- Nuclear Medicine
- Nephrology
- Neurosurgery
- Obstetrics and Gynaecology
- Ophthalmology
- Paediatric Surgery
- Paediatrics
- Pathology
- Pain & Palliative Care
- Pharmacology
- Physiology
- Psychiatry
- Radiology and Imaging
- Radiotherapy
- Physical Medicine and Rehabilitation
- Pulmonary Critical Care and Sleep Medicine
- Regional STD Teaching Training and Research Centre
- Sport Injury Centre
- Urology

== Laparoscopic cholecystectomy ==
The hospital has an eminent faculty of Surgeons in the department of Surgery. As prevalent, Cholecystectomy (removal of gall bladder ) was being contemplated by the conventional method using a 5 to 8 inch incision. This resulted in considerable postoperative pain, increased hospital stay for more than 7–10 days, a delayed ambulatory period and prolonged recovery time.

In an attempt to minimise the above drawbacks of conventional Cholecystectomy an attempt was made with MiniLap Cholecystectomy through a single 6-8 cms incision. This was performed in 150 cases and the results were presented at the International College of Surgeons conference in London in November 1994 by Dr. N. C. Bose, Consultant and Head of Department of Surgery, Safdarjung Hospital. However, this procedure was abandoned shortly thereafter due to its limitations of difficult dissection.

The search for a technically safe process which was easier to perform and enhanced patients’ comfort, led to the introduction of Laparoscopic Cholecystectomy through keyhole incision. This high-tech surgery was contemplated through single or multiple keyhole incisions resulting in minimal postoperative pain, early ambulation and hospital discharge within 24 hrs’ with fastest recovery.

In Safdarjung Hospital, Dr. N. C. Bose, Consultant & Head of Surgery, along with his junior colleague Dr. S. V. Arya, Specialist in Surgery, were instrumental in the establishment of Laparoscopic Cholecystectomy operative procedure in February 1994. The duo performed 100 cases without any morbidity or mortality until June 1997. This procedure commonly known as Lap Chole is currently a gold standard for Cholecystectomy.

== History ==
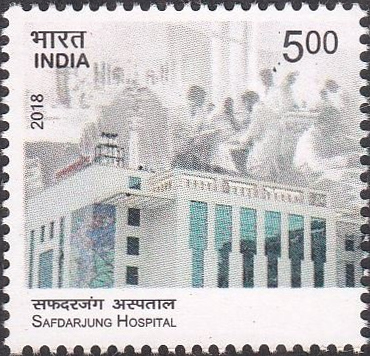
A 2018 stamp dedicated to the 60th anniversary of Safdarjung Hospital

American troops came to India during the Second World War and landed at the nearby Safdarjung airport, the only airport in Delhi at that time and then known as Willingdon Airfield. There was no hospital in the area where this hospital is situated. Some barracks were rapidly constructed south of the airport to establish a medical centre for American troops fighting in this region. The hospital was well equipped, with x-ray machine, a laboratory and other facilities for various emergency procedures. After the Second World War was over, America handed over the hospital to the Indian government and it is now known as Safdarjung Hospital. Later a medical college was started there by Central Government Health Scheme of the Health Ministry.

AIIMS was started in 1956 but there was no medical college in old Delhi until 1959 when Maulana Azad Medical College was started at Delhi Gate.

== See also ==
- Ministry of Health and Family Welfare
- Central Health Service (CHS)
