= Dominion of India =

British dominion in South Asia from 1947 to 1950

Union of India
- 1947–1950
- Flag (Note: In the days leading to India's independence, the Lion capital of Ashoka at Sarnath played an important role in the creation of both the state emblem and the national flag of the Dominion of India. They were modelled on the lions and the dharmachakra of the capital, and their adoption constituted an attempt to give India a symbolism of ethical sovereignty. On 22 July 1947, Jawaharlal Nehru, the interim head of government, and later the first prime minister of India proposed formally in the Constituent Assembly of India, which was tasked with creating the Constitution of India: "Resolved that the National Flag of India shall be a horizontal tricolour of deep saffron (kesari), white and dark green in equal proportion. In the centre of the white band, there shall be a Wheel in navy blue to represent the Charkha. The design of the Wheel shall be that of the Wheel (Chakra) which appears on the abacus of the Sarnath Lion Capital of Asoka. The diameter of the Wheel shall approximate to the width of the white band. The ratio of the width to the length of the flag shall ordinarily be 2:3." Although several members in the assembly had proposed other meanings for India's national symbols, Nehru's meaning came to prevail. On 11 December 1947, the Constituent Assembly adopted the resolution.) Emblem (Note: Nehru was well-acquainted with the history of Ashoka, having written about it in his books Letters from a father to his daughter and The Discovery of India. The major contemporary philosopher of the religions of India, Sarvepalli Radhakrishnan, also advised Nehru in the choice. The state emblem of the Dominion of India was accepted by the cabinet on 29 December 1947, with the resolution of a national motto set aside for a future date.)

- Administrative divisions of India, 1950
- Capital: New Delhi
- Demonym: Indian
- Government: Federal parliamentary constitutional monarchy
- Monarch
  - 1947–1950: George VI
- Governor-General
  - 1947–1948: Lord Mountbatten
  - 1948–1950: C. Rajagopalachari
- Prime Minister
  - 1947–1950: Jawaharlal Nehru
- Legislature: Constituent Assembly
- History
  - Independence: 15 August 1947
  - Republican constitution adopted: 26 January 1950

Area
- 1949–1950: 3,159,814 km^{2} (1,220,011 sq mi)

Population
  - 1949–1950: 360,185,000 (estimated)
- Currency: Indian rupee
| Preceded by | Succeeded by |
| British Raj; See list of princely states | Republic of India |
- Today part of: India; Bangladesh (Note: See territorial exchanges between India and Bangladesh (India–Bangladesh enclaves).)

The Dominion of India, officially the Union of India, was an independent dominion in the British Commonwealth of Nations existing between 15 August 1947 and 26 January 1950. Until its independence, India had been ruled as an informal empire by the United Kingdom. The empire, also called the British Raj and sometimes the British Indian Empire, consisted of regions, collectively called British India, that were directly administered by the British government, and regions, called the princely states, that were ruled by Indian rulers under a system of paramountcy, in favour of the British. The Dominion of India was formalised by the passage of the Indian Independence Act 1947. This same Act also formalised an independent Dominion of Pakistan, which was composed of the two regions of British India that are today Pakistan and Bangladesh. The Dominion of India was also referred to as "India" in common parlance, but it differed from British India in that it was now independent and geographically smaller: large swathes of the former territory now formed the also newly created but now distinct Dominion of Pakistan. Under the Act, the King remained the monarch in right of new dominions, but the British government relinquished all responsibility for the governing of its former territories. The British Government also revoked its treaty rights and obligations with the rulers of the more than 500 princely states within the region, and instead advised them to join in a political union with either India or Pakistan. Accordingly, the use of one of the British monarch's regnal titles, "Emperor of India", was abandoned.

The Dominion of India came into existence upon the partition of India, a process under and legal act of the Government and Crown of the United Kingdom. Its creation was preceded, however, by a pioneering and influential anti-colonial nationalist movement which became a major factor in ending the broader British Raj. The first government of the new Union was formed under Jawaharlal Nehru as prime minister with Vallabhbhai Patel as deputy prime minister, both members of the Indian National Congress. Lord Mountbatten, who had served as the last Viceroy of India, stayed on from August 1947 until June 1948 as independent India's first governor-general; he was replaced by C. Rajagopalachari.

The religious violence occasioned by the partition was soon reduced, in large part through the efforts of Mahatma Gandhi; resentment of him grew though amongst Hindu fundamentalists, eventually costing him his life. To Patel fell the responsibility for integrating the princely states of the British Indian Empire into the new India. Lasting through the remainder of 1947 and the better part of 1948, integration was accomplished by means of inducements, and on occasion threats. It went smoothly except in the cases of Junagadh State, Hyderabad State, and, especially, Kashmir and Jammu, the last leading to a war between India and Pakistan and to a dispute that has lasted until today.

During the existence of the Union/Dominion, the new constitution of the Republic of India was drafted. It was based in large part on the Government of India Act 1935, the last constitution of British India, but also reflected some elements of the Constitution of the United States as well as the Constitution of Ireland. The new constitution disavowed some aspects of India's past by abolishing untouchability and derecognising caste distinctions.

A major effort was made during this period to document the demographic changes accompanying the partition of British India. According to most demographers, between 14 and 18 million people moved between India and Pakistan as refugees of the partition, and upwards of one million people were killed. A major effort was also made to document the poverty prevalent in India. A committee appointed by the government in 1949, estimated the average annual income of an Indian to be Rs. 260 (or $55; perhaps equivalent to Rs. 31,342 in 2026), with many earning well below that amount. The government faced low levels of literacy among its population: it was estimated at 23.54% for men and just 7.62% for women in the 1951 Census of India. The Union Government also began work to improve the status of women, which bore some fruit eventually in the mid-1950s passage of the Hindu code bills, outlawing patrilineality, marital desertion and child marriages (though evasion of these bans continued for years thereafter). The Dominion of India lasted until 1950, at which time India became a republic within the Commonwealth with a president as head of state.

== History ==
=== Background: 1946 ===
By the early 1920s, the Indian National Congress had become the principal leader of Indian nationalism. Led by Mahatma Gandhi, the Congress was to lead India to independence from the United Kingdom, (Note: "South Asian parties include several of the oldest in the post-colonial world, foremost among them the 129-year-old Indian National Congress that led India to independence in 1947") (Note: "The organization that led India to independence, the Indian National Congress, was established in 1885.") and powerfully influence other anti-colonial nationalist movements in the British Empire. (Note: "... anti-colonial movements ... which, like many other nationalist movements elsewhere in the empire, were strongly influenced by the Indian National Congress.") The Congress's vision of an independent India based on religious pluralism was challenged in the early 1940s by a new Muslim nationalism, led by the All-India Muslim League and Muhammad Ali Jinnah, which demanded a separate homeland for the Muslims of British India.

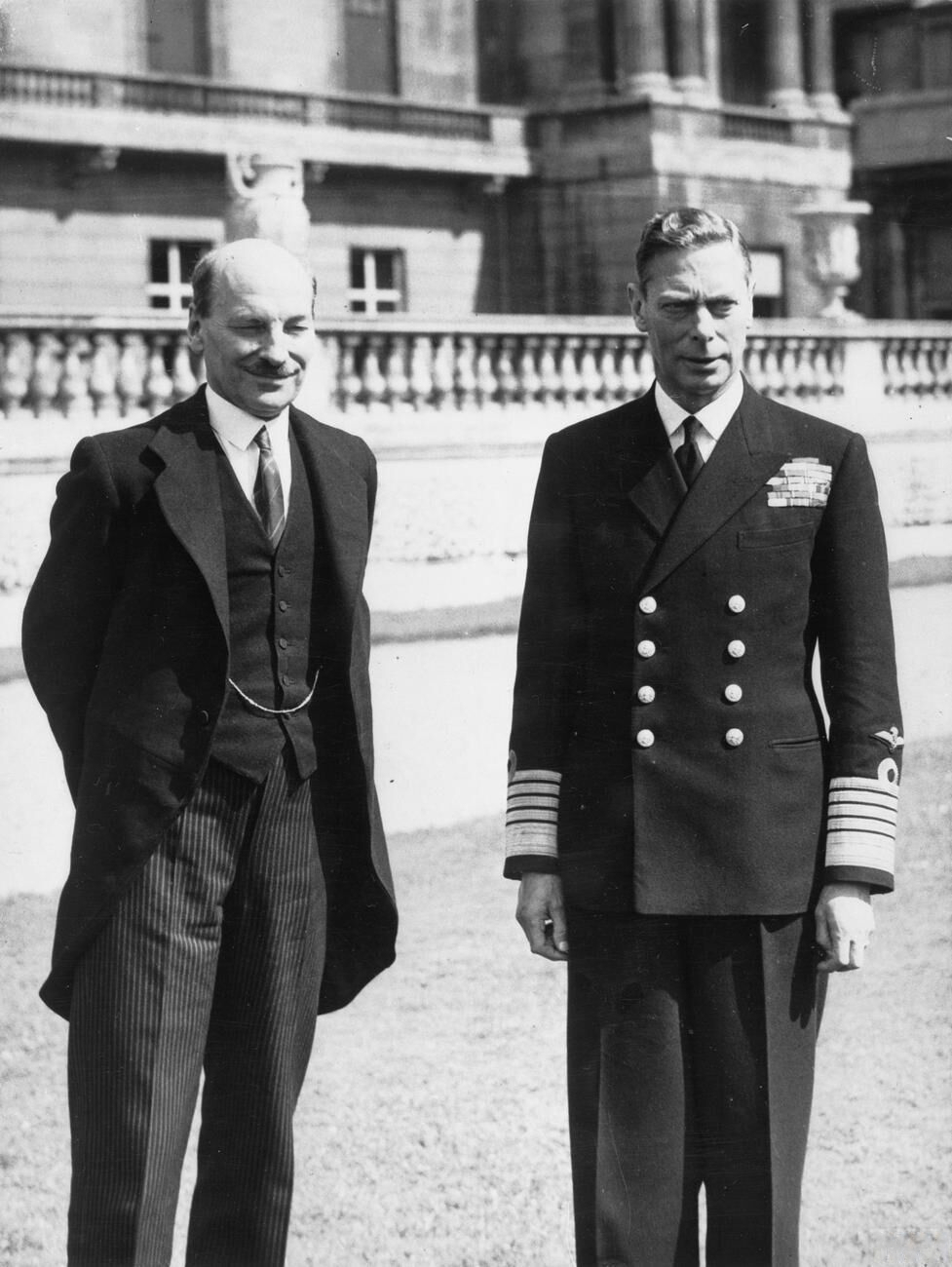
Clement Attlee left with King George VI on the grounds of Buckingham Palace after Labour Party's victory in the general elections, 26 July 1945.

In the 1945 general elections in Britain, Labour Party won. A government headed by Clement Attlee, with Stafford Cripps and Lord Pethick-Lawrence in the Cabinet, was sworn in. Many in the new government, including Attlee, had a long history of supporting the decolonization of India. Late in 1946, the Labour government, its exchequer, and population, moreover, exhausted by the Second World War, decided to end British rule in India, and in early 1947 Britain announced its intention of transferring power no later than June 1948.

Earlier in 1946, elections had been called in India. The Congress had won electoral victories in eight of the eleven provinces. The negotiations between the Congress and the Muslim League, however, stalled over the issue of a division of India. Jinnah proclaimed 16 August 1946 "Direct Action Day" with the stated goal of peacefully highlighting the demand for a Muslim homeland in British India. The following day Hindu-Muslim riots broke out in Calcutta and quickly spread throughout India. Although the Government of India and the Congress were both shaken by the course of events, a Congress-led interim government was installed in September, with Jawaharlal Nehru as united India's prime minister.

=== Independence: 1947 ===
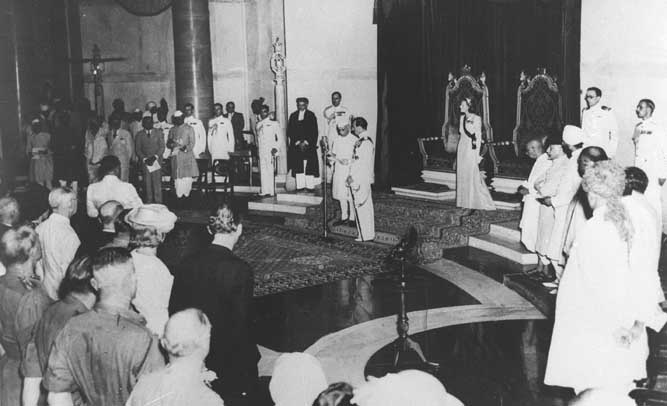
Lord Mountbatten swearing in Jawaharlal Nehru as the first prime minister of independent India on 15 August 1947

By March 1947 when the new viceroy, Lord Louis Mountbatten arrived, the violence between Hindus and Muslims in the provinces of Punjab and Bengal had not abated. With the British Army unprepared for the potential for increased violence, Mountbatten wanted to advance the date for independence and the transfer of power. In June 1947 the nationalist leaders, including Nehru representing the Congress, Jinnah representing the Muslim League, and Baldev Singh representing the Sikhs, agreed to a partition of the country and Mountbatten was able to rush the British withdrawal forward. The predominantly Hindu and Sikh areas were assigned to the new India and predominantly Muslim areas to the new nation of Pakistan; the plan included a partition of the Muslim-majority provinces of Punjab and Bengal.

On 14 August 1947, the new Dominion of Pakistan came into being, with Muhammad Ali Jinnah sworn in as its first Governor-General in Karachi. The following day, 15 August 1947, the Dominion of India (officially the Union of India), became an independent country with official ceremonies taking place in New Delhi, and with Jawaharlal Nehru assuming the office of the prime minister, and the viceroy, Louis Mountbatten, staying on as its first Governor General.

Mountbatten's decision to hasten the transfer of power has been both praised and criticised over the years. Supporters feel that an early transfer forced Indian politicians into abandoning petty quarrels and accepting their obligations in stopping an outrage that the United Kingdom government was no longer able to control. Critics feel that if the British had stayed on for another year, had institutions in place for a transition, had the army readied in troublesome areas, a less violent transfer might have resulted.

=== Partition: 1947 ===
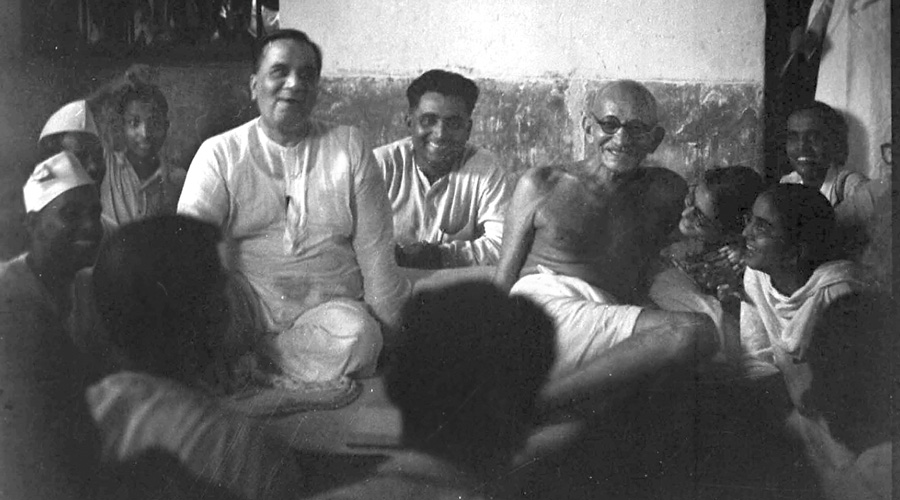
Huseyn Shaheed Suhrawardy, left, prime minister of Bengal (1946–1947) and later prime minister of Pakistan, and Mahatma Gandhi during their 73-hour fast in Calcutta to stop religious violence in the days after India's Independence Day

The Radcliffe Commission, tasked with assigning each district to either Pakistan or India, announced its award on 17 August 1947, two days after the transfer of power. It divided the Sikh-dominated regions of the Punjab in equal proportion between the two dominions. Sikh groups, which had feared the worst, had been preparing to mount a vigorous opposition to the award. To counter the expected violence, the British Raj government had formed a 50,000-strong Indian Boundary Force. When the violence began, the Force proved ineffectual. Most units, which had been recruited locally, had stronger ties to one or other of Punjab's three religious groups, rendering them unable to maintain neutrality under stress. In a matter of days, Sikhs and Hindus of the East Punjab were suddenly and unexpectedly attacking the Muslims there, and in the West Punjab, Muslims were returning the violence and the ferocity on the Sikhs. Trains taking the refugees to their new lands were stopped, their occupants slaughtered regardless of age and gender. Long lines of humans and oxcarts travelling East and West to their new dominions were intercepted and overwhelmed.

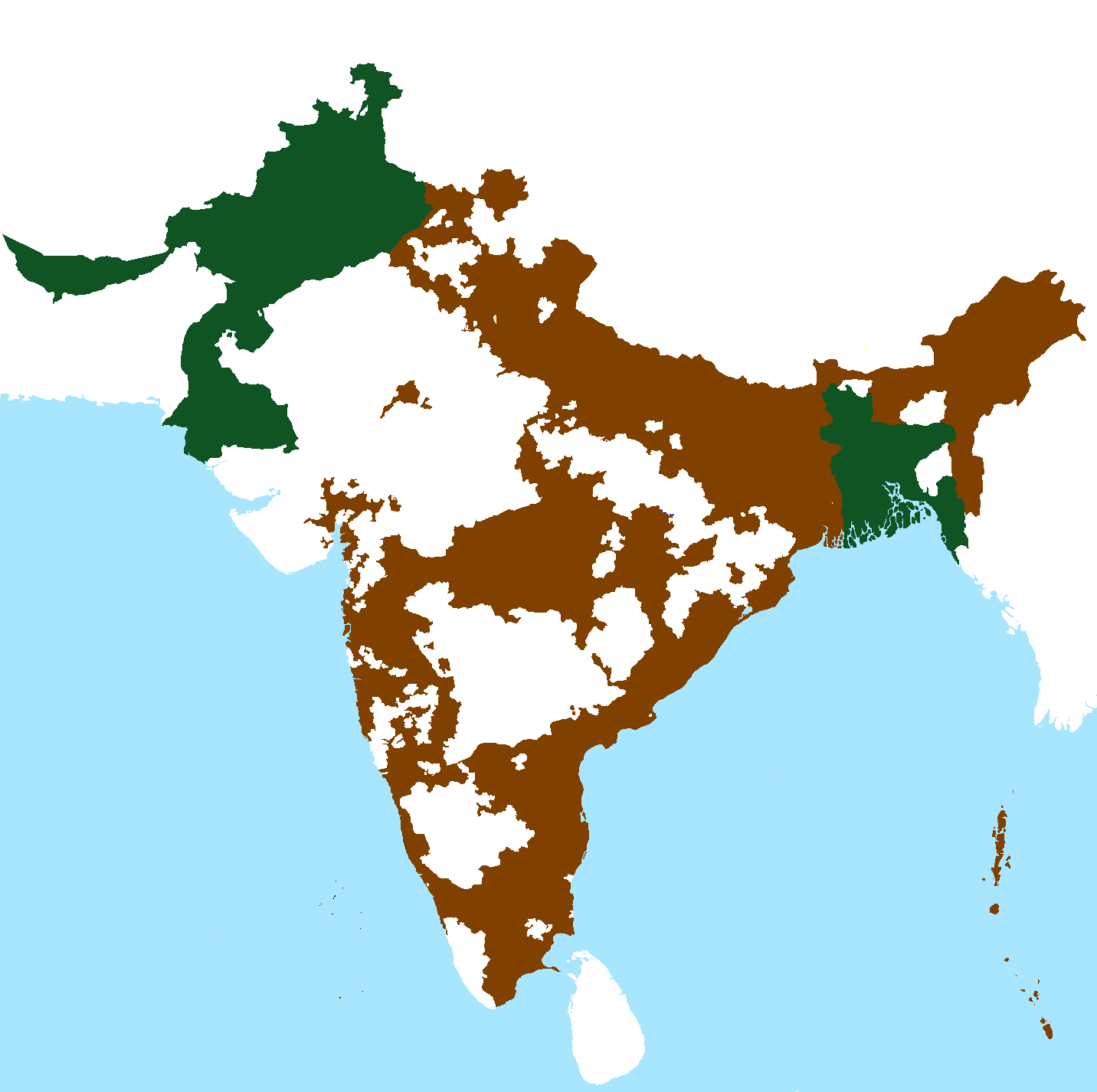
Territorial extent of the Dominions of India (in brown) and Pakistan (in green) at independence on 15 August 1947

The Hindu refugees from the west Punjab arriving in Delhi ended up tearing away the Muslim community there from their established cultural patterns and values, and temporarily destabilized the new government. The death toll in the partition violence may never be known, but Judge G. D. Khosla, in Stern Reckoning thought it to be about 500,000. In addition, there was what historian Percival Spear has called "an involuntary exchange of population," which might be of the order of five and a half million travelling each way across the new border. From Sind, some 400,000 Hindus migrated to India, as did a million Hindus from East Pakistan (now Bangladesh) to West Bengal province in India. Migrations coming in the wake of the massacres severely taxed the strength of the new government.

=== Settling the refugees ===
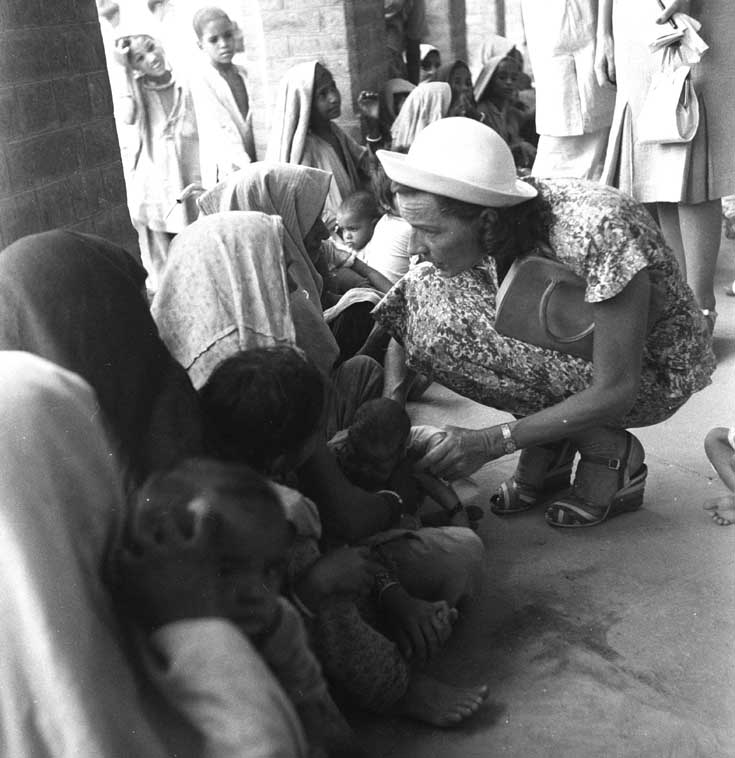
Lady Edwina Mountbatten visiting a refugee camp just outside Delhi in June 1947.

The religious killings had abated by the Autumn of 1947, but the government was weighed down with the responsibility of settling the refugees. In the Punjab, there was land available recently vacated by the Muslims; in Delhi, there was a glut of incoming Hindu and Sikh refugees: many more were arriving there than were Muslims departing for Pakistan. The refugees were settled in several enclosed areas on the outskirts of Delhi. But they had soon overflowed into the streets and even occupied mosques. They attempted to take possession the Purana Qila, or Old Fort—ruins from the Delhi Sultanate—which were milling with Muslims waiting to be expatriated to Pakistan. Religious passions were running high; a pogrom of the remaining Muslims in Delhi was feared.

His mission of quelling the violence in Bengal accomplished, Mahatma Gandhi arrived in Delhi in October 1947. His new mission was to bring back the peace in the city, and this entailed standing up for the embattled Muslims. He chose to direct his activities from the scheduled caste (or "untouchables') "Balmiki Temple" in the Gole Market area of the city. (Eventually, as the temple was requisitioned for sheltering the incoming refugees, Gandhi moved to two rooms in Birla House, a large mansion in central Delhi.) Some groups within the Indian government opposed Gandhi's activities.

Soon another issue sprouted up. The partition of India had not just been a division of the land of British India; it had also involved a division of its assets. Assets whose amounts had been negotiated earlier needed to be transferred from India (where the treasury was) to Pakistan. The Indian government had withheld this payment in order to pressure Pakistan over the burgeoning crisis in Kashmir; India feared an onslaught from Pakistan during the dreaded winter months.

On 12 January 1948, Gandhi, who had turned 78 the previous October, undertook several hunger strike to stop the religious violence. On 15 January, the government took the decision to release assets it owed to Pakistan. On 18 January Gandhi broke his fast only after significant politicians and leaders of communal bodies showed their commitment to a joint plan for restoration of peace.

=== War over Kashmir ===
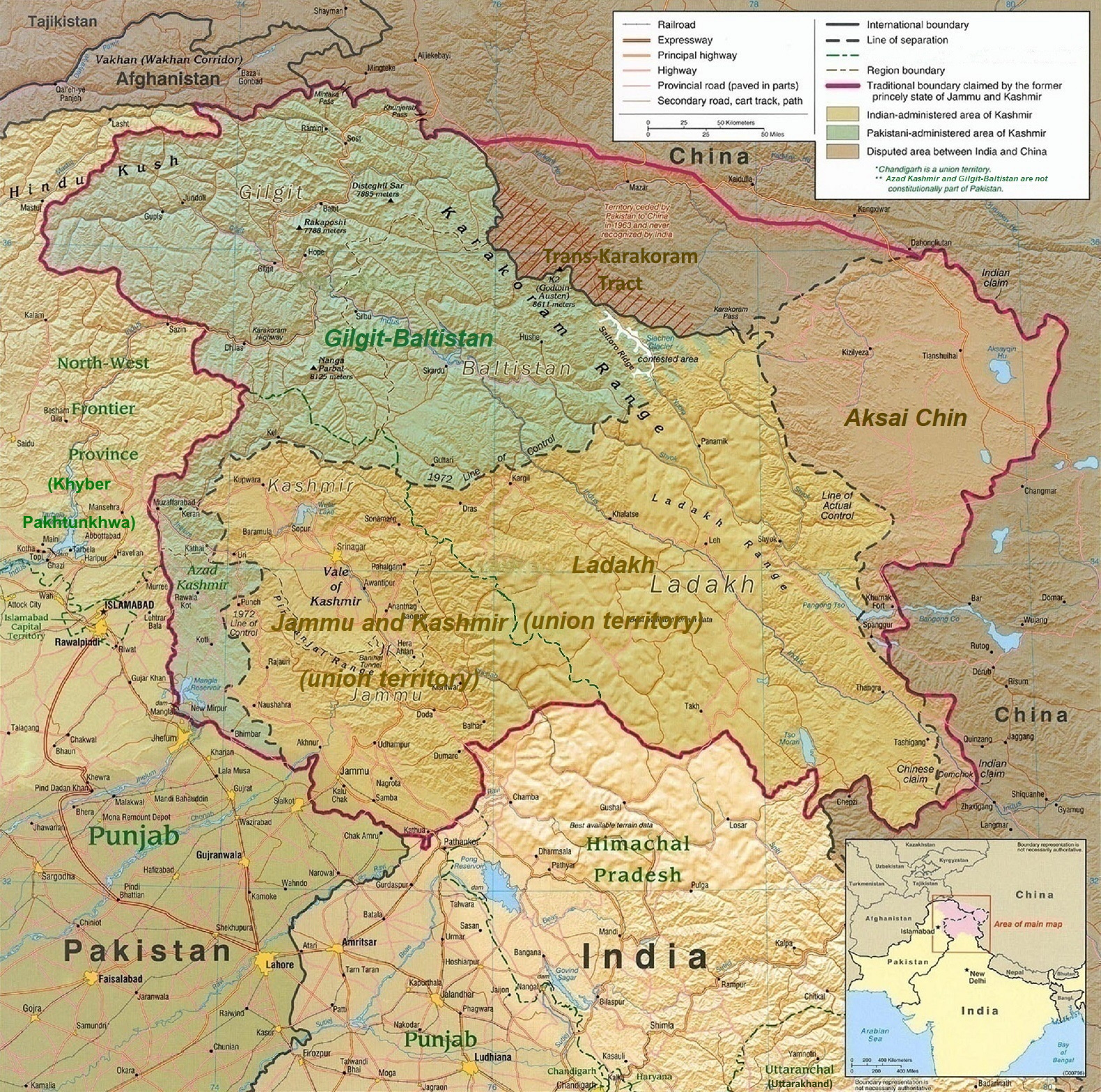
Kashmir showing the regions controlled by India and Pakistan. The Line of Control, the successor of cease-fire line of 1949, separates the two regions.

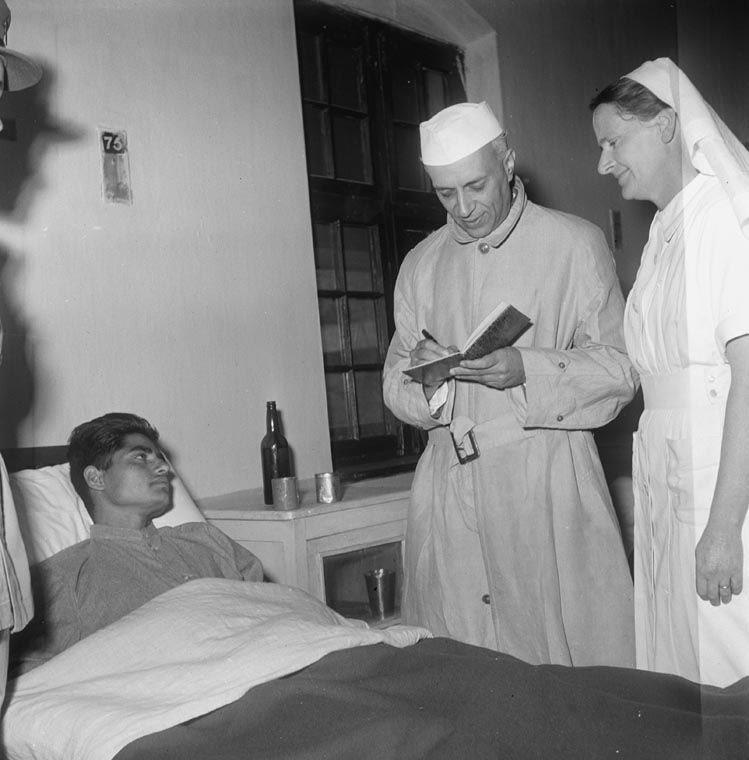
Nehru visiting an Indian soldier at the Brigade Headquarters Military Hospital in Srinagar, Kashmir, in May 1948

The princely state of Kashmir was created in 1846, after the defeat of the Sikh Empire by the British in the First Anglo-Sikh War. Upon the purchase of the region from the British under the Treaty of Amritsar, the Raja of Jammu, Gulab Singh, became the new ruler of Kashmir. The rule of his descendants, under the paramountcy (or tutelage) of the British Crown, lasted until the Partition of India in 1947. Kashmir was connected to India through the Gurdaspur district in the Punjab region. However, its population was 77% Muslim, and it shared a border with what would later become Pakistan. A significant portion of its economic activity had taken place down the Jhelum River with the Punjab region of Pakistan. Gulab Singh's descendant, Hari Singh, who was the reigning Maharaja of Kashmir in August 1947, had signed a "standstill agreement" with Pakistan to facilitate trade and communication. According to historian Burton Stein,

It was anticipated that he would accede to Pakistan when the British paramountcy ended. When he hesitated to do this, Pakistan launched a guerrilla onslaught meant to frighten its ruler into submission. Instead, the Maharaja appealed to Mountbatten for assistance, and the governor-general agreed on the condition that the ruler accede to India. Indian soldiers entered Kashmir and drove the Pakistani-sponsored irregulars from all but a small section of the state. The United Nations was then invited to mediate the quarrel. The UN mission insisted that the opinion of Kashmiris must be ascertained, while India insisted that no referendum could occur until all of the state had been cleared of irregulars.

In the last days of 1948, a ceasefire was agreed under UN auspices. However, since the plebiscite demanded by the UN was never conducted, relations between India and Pakistan soured, and eventually led to two more wars over Kashmir in 1965 and 1999.

=== Death of Gandhi ===
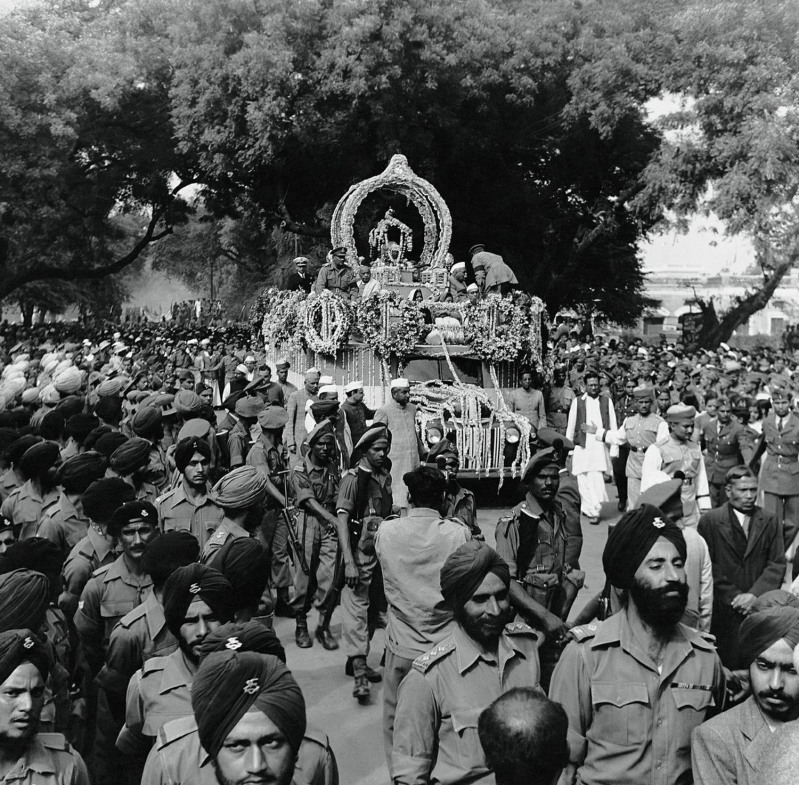
Mahatma Gandhi's ashes on a carriage being drawn by soldiers of the Indian army for immersion in the Triveni Sangam, Allahabad, February 1948

Some Indians were incensed by Gandhi's last fast and accused him of being too accommodating to both Muslims and Pakistan. Among them was Nathuram Godse, a Hindu nationalist, a member of the political party Hindu Mahasabha as well as a former member of the Rashtriya Swayamsevak Sangh (RSS), a right-wing Hindu paramilitary volunteer organization. On 30 January 1948, Godse assassinated Gandhi in Birla House as Gandhi was on his way to his evening prayer meeting there, shooting Gandhi in the chest three times.

Later that evening, Nehru addressed the nation by radio:

Friends and comrades, the light has gone out of our lives, and there is darkness everywhere, and I do not quite know what to tell you or how to say it. Our beloved leader, Bapu as we called him, the father of the nation, is no more. Perhaps I am wrong to say that; nevertheless, we will not see him again, as we have seen him for these many years, we will not run to him for advice or seek solace from him, and that is a terrible blow, not only for me, but for millions and millions in this country.

Gandhi was mourned around the world. The British prime minister Clement Attlee said in a radio address to the United Kingdom on the night of 30 January 1948:

Everyone will have learnt with profound horror of the brutal murder of Mr. Gandhi, and I know that I am expressing the views of the British people in offering to his fellow-countrymen our deep sympathy in the loss of their greatest citizen. Mahatma Gandhi, as he was known in India, was one of the outstanding figures in the world today, ... For a quarter of a century this one man has been the major factor in every consideration of the Indian problem.

After the mourning period was over, the finger of blame was firmly pointed at the Hindu extremists who had plotted the assassination, bringing not only them into disrepute, but Hindu nationalism in general, which did not recover its political reputation until many decades later. The Deputy Prime Minister, Sardar Patel, who was also the Home Minister, was reproached for inadequate security arrangements.

Gandhi's loss gave Nehru more power. According to historian Percival Spear, "The government was really a duumvirate between him (Nehru), who represented the idealism and left-wing tendencies of the party, and Sardar Vallabhbhai Patel, the realist and party boss from Gujarat who leaned to authoritarianism, orthodoxy, and big business." At Gandhi's pressing, Patel had twice put off claiming the prime minister ship. It was thought he might assert his claim now, but Gandhi's loss had affected him equally deeply, and although there was still some discord between him and Nehru, he buried himself resolutely in his work on the integration of the princely states. By the year's end, this was complete. Patel died in 1950, and thereafter, Nehru ruled without any opposition.

=== Political integration of princely states ===
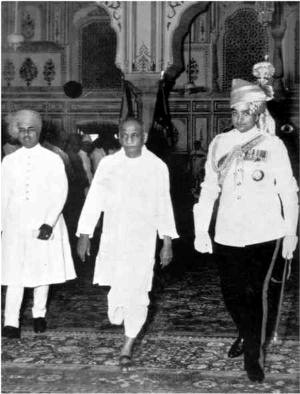
Sardar Patel (centre) leaving the Durbar Hall in Jaipur after the inauguration of the Rajasthan Union in 1949. On the right is Man Singh II, the Maharaja of Jaipur and the first Rajpramukh of the Union; on the left is the Maharaja of Kotah

Two matters had been left unsettled from the Raj years: the integration of the princely states and the drawing up of a constitution, and they were addressed in that order.

There were 362 princely states in India. (Note: The numbers were higher if "estates" were included.) The premier 21-gun salute state of Hyderabad had an area of 200,000 km^{2} (77,000 sq mi). Its population was 17 million. At the other end of the spectrum, some two hundred states had an area of less than 25 km^{2} (10 sq mi). The British had revoked their treaty rights and advised them to join in a political union with India or Pakistan. For a short time, the Nawab of Bhopal and some British political agents attempted to form a third "political force," but the princes were unable to trust each other. By 15 August, all but three had acceded.

Even after accession, there remained the question of deciding the place of the princes in the new political union. Sardar Patel and his assistant V. P. Menon employed a combination of threats and inducements, the latter including special privileges and tax-free pensions. Within a few months, all the states that had acceded in August 1947 had been blended in some fashion into a new federal union. Baroda State and Kathiawar were combined to form the new federal unit of Saurashtra; and the states of Rajputana were united to form Rajasthan. The princely states of Travancore and Cochin became Kerala. Mysore being large in extent and population became a federal unit by itself. Hundreds of small states were absorbed and soon became lost within larger federal units.

Some former princes such as those of Mysore and Travancore were given titular leadership roles, called "Raj Pramukh" (lit. "state leader"), in the new federal units, but their former power was absent, and the political structure was invariantly democratic. Other former princes went into public service or private business. After 1950, they survived as historical vestiges but were no longer political determinants in the new India.

Except for Kashmir, where a major military conflict had begun in October 1947, two states, Hyderabad, and Junagadh had remained independent. Junagadh was a small state on the coast of the Kathiawar peninsula, but its land border was with India. It had a majority Hindu population but with a Muslim Nawab. The Nawab acceded to Pakistan after independence. Within a few weeks, Indian troops marched into Junagadh. A plebiscite took place and was declared for India. Although Pakistan protested, it took no further action.

Hyderabad was in a different class. Although it had an 85%-Hindu population, its Muslim rule had begun during the Mughal period. The ruling Nizams had proclaimed themselves to be equal allies of the British rather than subordinates. But the state was landlocked, surrounded on all sides by India. "No Indian government," according to Percival Spear, "could afford to have a block of land so placed independent and perhaps hostile." The Nizam had rejected generous terms for accession brokered by the British. Eventually, when he allowed the power of an extremist organization, the Razakars, to grow within his state, India militarily invaded the state in what was called a "police action," incorporating Hyderabad into its federal structure.

=== Framing the new constitution ===
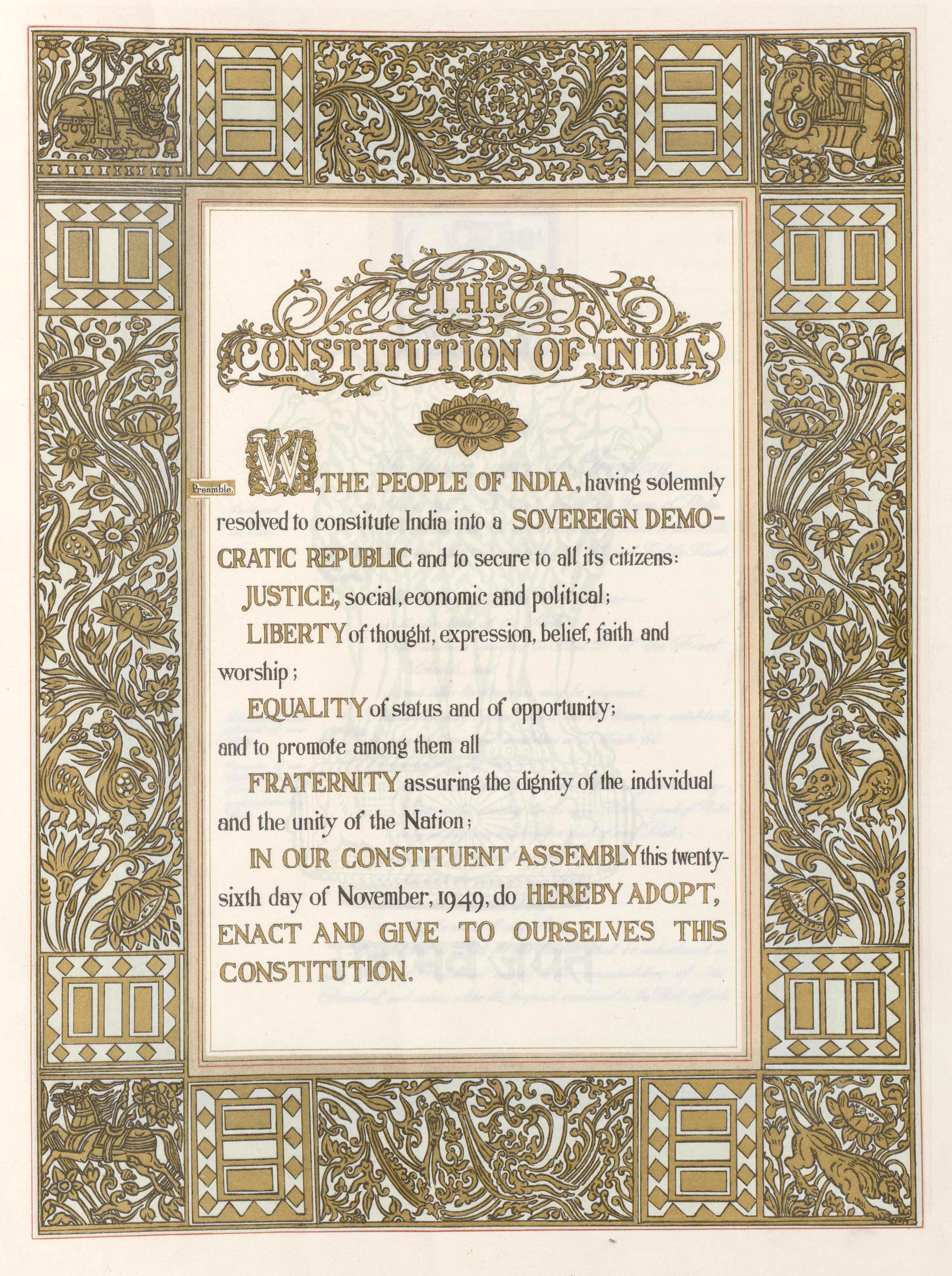
The preamble of the Constitution of India.

The final achievement of the period of transition was the new constitution. It was drafted by the Constituent Assembly with uncommon speed and absence of irregularities between 1946 and 1949. The Government of India Act 1935 was used as a model and framework. Long passages from the Act were included. The constitution describes a federal state with a parliamentary system of democracy. The federal structure is conspicuous for the strength of the central government, which has exclusively exercised control of defence, foreign affairs, railways, ports, and currency. The President, the constitutional head of government, has reserve powers for taking over the administration of a state. The central legislature has two houses, the Lok Sabha whose delegates are directly elected by the people in general elections every five years, and the Rajya Sabha, whose members are nominated by the elected representatives in the states.

There are also features not to be found in the Act of 1935. The definition of fundamental rights is based on the Constitution of the United States, and the constitutional directives, or goals of endeavor, are based on the Constitution of Ireland. An Indian institution recommended by the constitution is the panchayat or village committees. Untouchability is illegal (Article 17) and caste distinctions are derecognized (Articles 15(2) and 16(2)). The promulgation of the Indian constitution transformed India into a republic within the Commonwealth.

== Dominion Constitution and Government ==
India as a free and independent dominion within the British Commonwealth of Nations (its title changed in 1949 to "Commonwealth of Nations") came into existence on 15 August 1947 under the provisions of the Indian Independence Act 1947 which had received royal assent on 18 July 1947. This act, along with the Government of India Act 1935 ( text here) the latter to be suitably amended to the changed context, served as the constitution of the dominion. Under the Indian Independence Act, the British government relinquished all responsibility of governing the territories that formerly constituted British India; the legislatures of the new dominions could "repeal or amend" any existing act of the British parliament; no future act of the British parliament would extend to the dominions unless extended so and enacted by the dominion legislature. Reflecting the changed status, the royal style and titles "Indiae Imperator" and "Emperor of India" was abandoned.

In January 1949, India consisted of nine Governors' Provinces, Madras, Bombay, West Bengal, the United Provinces, East Punjab, Bihar, the Central Provinces and Berar, Assam and Orissa; five Chief Commissioners' Provinces, Delhi, Ajmer-Merwara, Coorg, Andaman and Nicobar Islands, and Panth Piploda; and around 500 princely states. The Statesman's Yearbook (1949) stated, "The Governors' Provinces and the Chief Commissioners' Provinces are under the sovereignty of His Majesty the King of the United Kingdom." The princely states were governed by rulers who had ceded power in the areas of defence, external affairs, and communications to the dominion; such states were called "Acceding States." The provinces comprised approximately three-fourths of the dominion's population and three-fifths of the area.

Constitutionally, the Dominion was a federation with authority and responsibility devolving in the following manner. In the case of the Governors' Provinces: in the areas of defence, external affairs, currency and coinage, and communications, authority and responsibility lay with the Dominion legislature; in the administration of justice, public health, religious endowments, land and education, among others, authority lay with the provincial legislature; in the criminal law and procedure, marriage and divorce, succession, factories, labor welfare, workmen's compensation, health, insurance and old-age pensions, responsibility lay concurrently with both, with overriding powers to the Dominion. In the case of the Chief Commissioners' Provinces: the administration was directly by the central government, with the plenary power of legislation belonging to the Dominion legislature. In the case of the Princely States, the areas of legislation which they chose to hand over to the Dominion were expected to be specified in the Instruments of Accession" that were executed by the rulers and accepted the Governor-General; these areas were limited largely to defence, external affairs and communications.

The executive authority of the Dominion was exercised on behalf of King George VI by the Governor-General, who acted on the advice of his Council of Ministers. The cabinet system of responsible government prevailed at the centre. By convention, the cabinet includes members of minority and backward communities. The Chief Commissioners' Provinces were administered by the Governor-General through a Chief Commissioner appointed by him.

The power to legislate in the Dominion legislature lay with the Constituent Assembly. The allotment of seats to Provinces and Princely States in this assembly were approximately in the ratio of one seat to a million individuals in the population. In the instance of Governors' Provinces, seats were distributed between the main religious communities (General (which included Hindus), Muslims, and in the East Punjab, Sikh) in each provinces in proportion to their population. The representatives from each Governors' Province were elected by the Lower House of the provincial legislature, the voting being by the method of proportional representation with single transferable vote, with the members of the main communities voting in separate constituencies. Of the assembly representatives allotted to the Princely States, half were elected by the State legislatures (or other representative bodies); the remainder was nominated by the ruler.

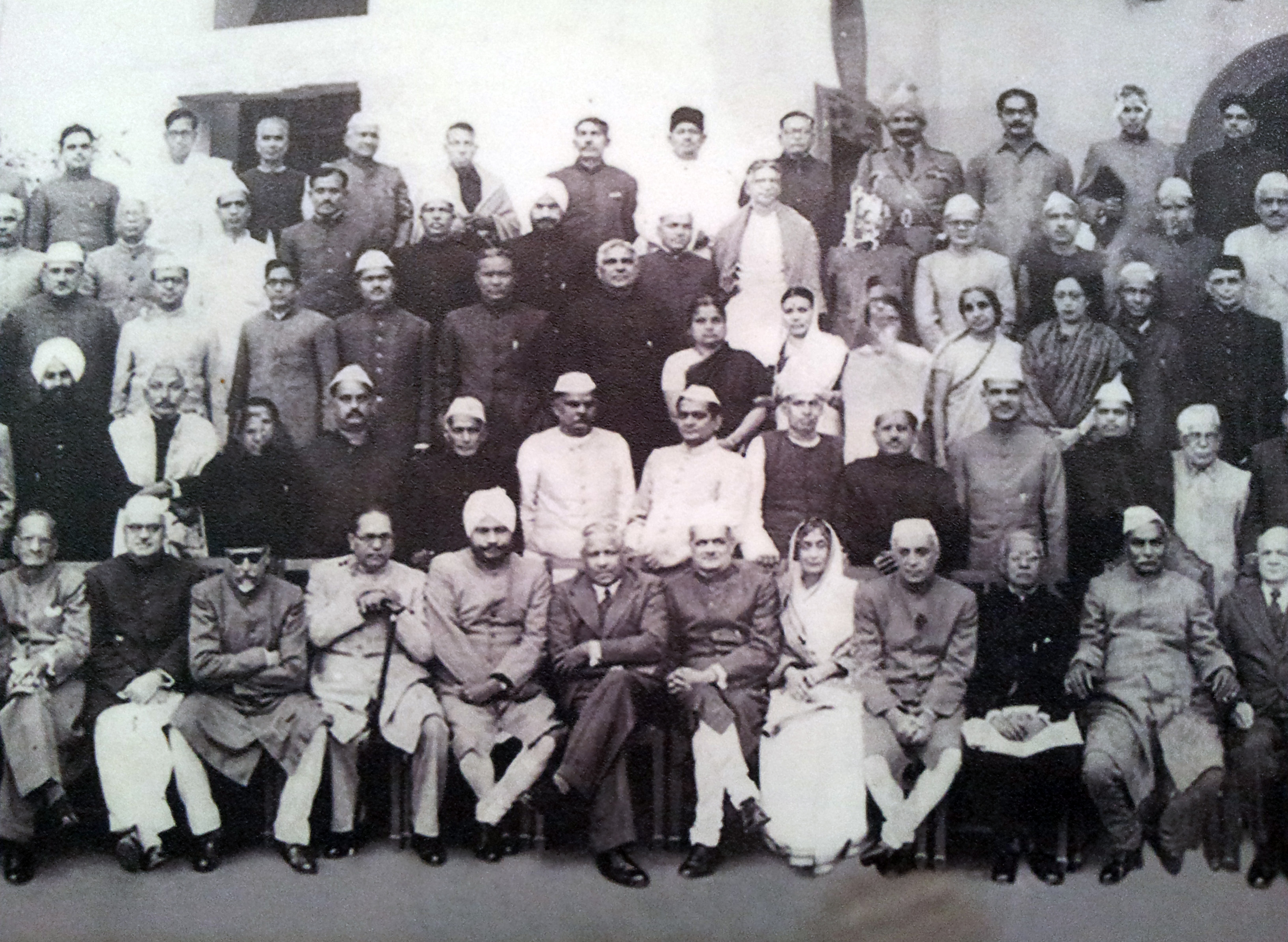
A section of the Constituent Assembly of the Dominion; first row shows Jawaharlal Nehru and some cabinet members.

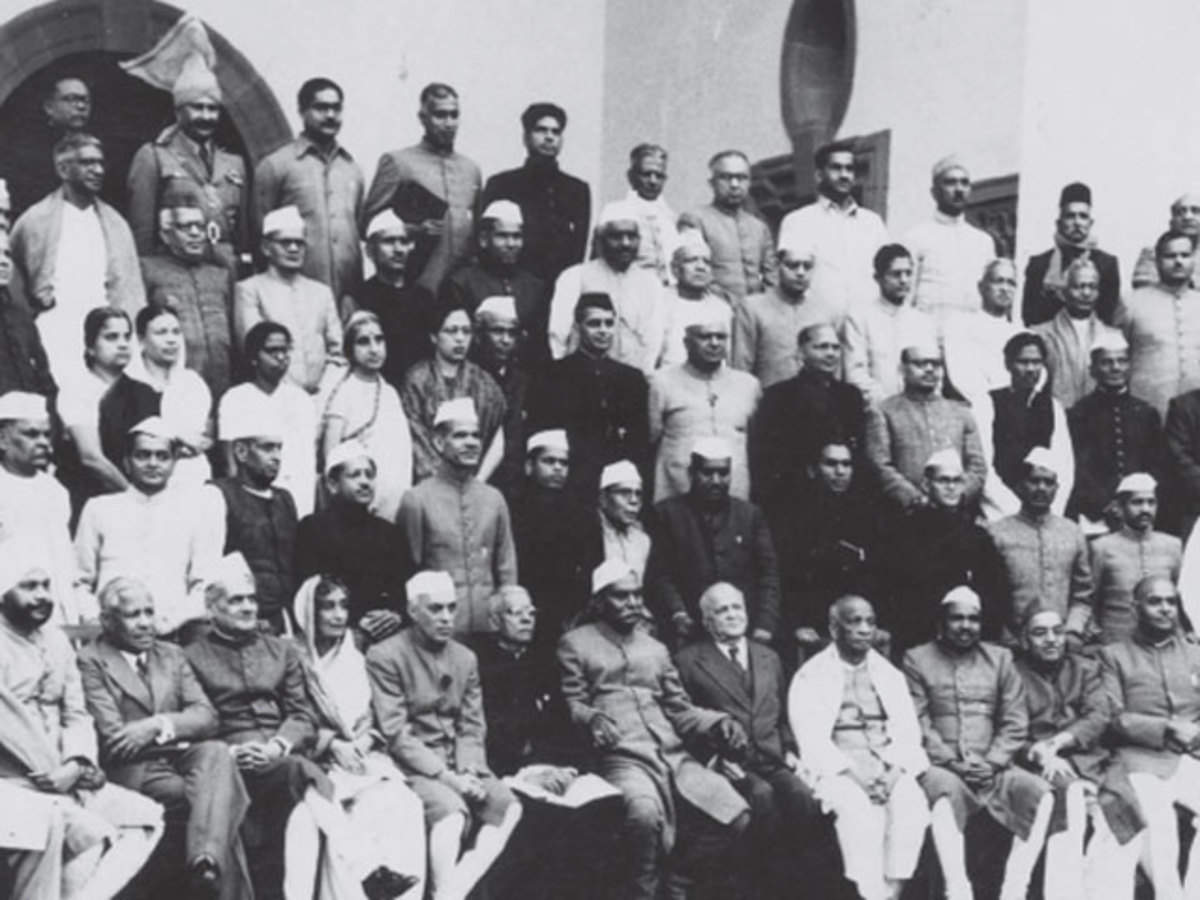
Another section of the Constituent assembly with Nehru and other cabinet members in the first row (with some overlap)

The plan of the Constituent Assembly of India was drawn up during the British Raj, following negotiations between nationalist leaders and the 1946 Cabinet Mission to India. Its members were elected by the new provincial assemblies formed after the 1946 Indian provincial elections held in January. The Constituent Assembly had 299 representatives consisting of 15 women and 284 men. The female members were: Purnima Banerjee, Kamla Chaudhry, Malati Choudhury, Durgabai Deshmukh, Rajkumari Amrit Kaur, Sucheta Kriplani, Annie Mascarene, Hansa Jivraj Mehta, Sarojini Naidu, Vijaya Lakshmi Pandit, Begum Aizaz Rasul, Renuka Ray, Leela Roy, Ammu Swaminathan and Dakshayani Velayudhan. Most were associated with the Indian nationalist movement.

The Interim Government of India was formed on 2 September 1946 from the newly elected members of the Constituent Assembly. The Indian National Congress secured 69 percent of all of the seats, whereas the Muslim League had a smaller number, but significantly all of the seats that were reserved for Muslims. There were also fewer numbers from other parties, such as the Scheduled Caste Federation, the Communist Party of India, and the Unionist Party. In June 1947, members from the provinces of Sindh, East Bengal, Baluchistan, West Punjab, and the North West Frontier Province withdrew to form the Constituent Assembly of Pakistan, which met in Karachi.

On 15 August 1947, all the members of the Constituent Assembly who had not withdrawn to Karachi came to constitute the Dominion of India's legislature. Only 28 members of the Muslim League finally joined. Later, 93 members were nominated from the princely states. The Congress secured a majority of 82%.

Jawaharlal Nehru took charge as Prime Minister of India on 15 August 1947. Vallabhbhai Patel served as the Deputy Prime Minister. Lord Mountbatten, and later C. Rajagopalachari, served as Governor-General until 26 January 1950, when Rajendra Prasad was elected as the first President of India. Nehru's cabinet of 15 included one woman.

Dominion of India: Cabinet headed by Jawaharlal Nehru, 15 August 1947–26 January 1950

| Portfolio | Minister | Took office | Left office | Party |
|---|---|---|---|---|
| Prime Minister; Minister of External Affairs and Commonwealth Relations; Minister of Scientific Research | Jawaharlal Nehru | 15 August 1947 | 26 January 1950 | INC |
| Deputy Prime Minister | Vallabhbhai Patel | 15 August 1947 | 26 January 1950 | INC |
| Minister of Home Affairs and States | Vallabhbhai Patel | 15 August 1947 | 26 January 1950 | INC |
| Minister of Information and Broadcasting | Vallabhbhai Patel | 15 August 1947 | 1949 | INC |
| Minister of Information and Broadcasting | R. R. Diwakar | 1949 | 26 January 1950 | INC |
| Minister of Finance | R. K. Shanmukham Chetty | 15 August 1947 | 1949 | INC |
| Minister of Finance | John Mathai | 1949 | 26 January 1950 | INC |
| Minister of Law | B. R. Ambedkar | 15 August 1947 | 26 January 1950 | SCF |
| Minister of Defence | Baldev Singh | 15 August 1947 | 26 January 1950 | Panthic Party |
| Minister of Railways and Transport | John Mathai | 15 August 1947 | 22 September 1948 | INC |
| Minister of Railways and Transport | N. Gopalaswami Ayyangar | 22 September 1948 | 26 January 1950 | INC |
| Minister of Education | Abul Kalam Azad | 15 August 1947 | 26 January 1950 | INC |
| Minister of Food and Agriculture | Rajendra Prasad | 15 August 1947 | 26 January 1950 | INC |
| Minister of Industries and Supplies | Syama Prasad Mukherjee | 15 August 1947 | 26 January 1950 | HM |
| Minister of Labour | Jagjivan Ram | 15 August 1947 | 26 January 1950 | INC |
| Minister of Commerce | Cooverji Hormusji Bhabha | 15 August 1947 | 26 January 1950 | INC |
| Minister of Communications | Rafi Ahmed Kidwai | 15 August 1947 | 26 January 1950 | INC |
| Minister of Health | Amrit Kaur | 15 August 1947 | 26 January 1950 | INC |
| Minister of Works, Mines and Power | Narhar Vishnu Gadgil | 15 August 1947 | 26 January 1950 | INC |
| Minister of Relief and Rehabilitation | K. C. Neogy | 15 August 1947 | 26 January 1950 | INC |

== Demographics ==
The major demographic effort in the period was directed at measuring the effects of the Partition of India. The creation of Pakistan decisively depended on the proportionally high percentages of Muslims in certain geographical areas of the subcontinent. In the 1941 census, 24.3% of pre-independent India was recorded to be Muslim. In addition, 76 of the 435 districts in India had Muslim majority populations. These districts were home to 60% of the 94.4 million Muslims. The Muslim population was clustered in two regions: the northwest, which included the Punjab, and the east, which included a large part of Bengal. These Muslim-majority districts were to constitute the western and eastern half of Pakistan that came into being in 1947. But there was also a fairly large and spatially spread out minority population of Muslims in India, and a minority of Hindus in Pakistan. It was therefore inevitable that there would be an exchange of the populations involving migration of Muslims into West and East Pakistan and migrations of non-Muslims (mainly Hindus, but also Sikhs in the northwest) from Pakistan into India.

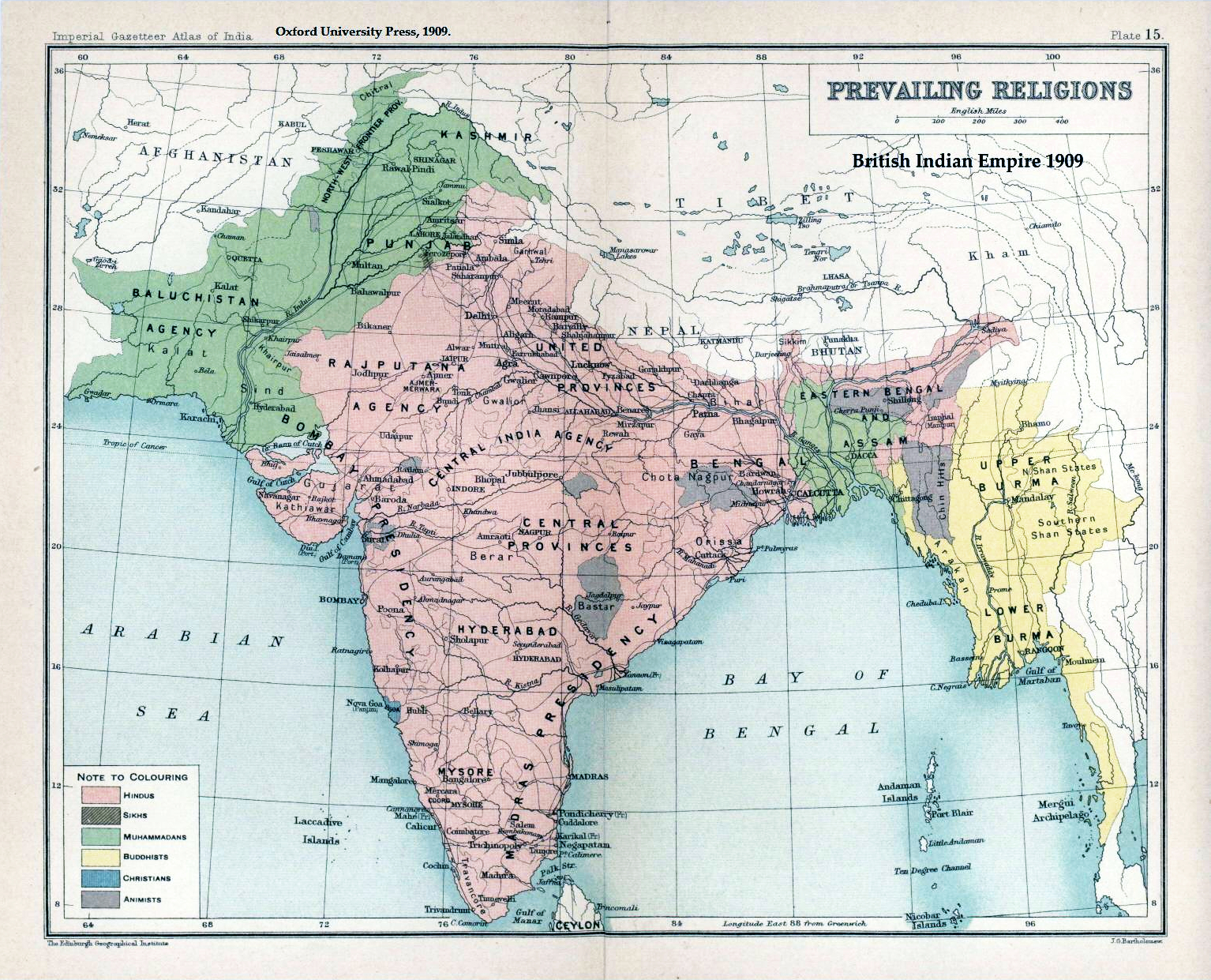
India: the prevailing religions, 1909, Imperial Gazetteer of India.

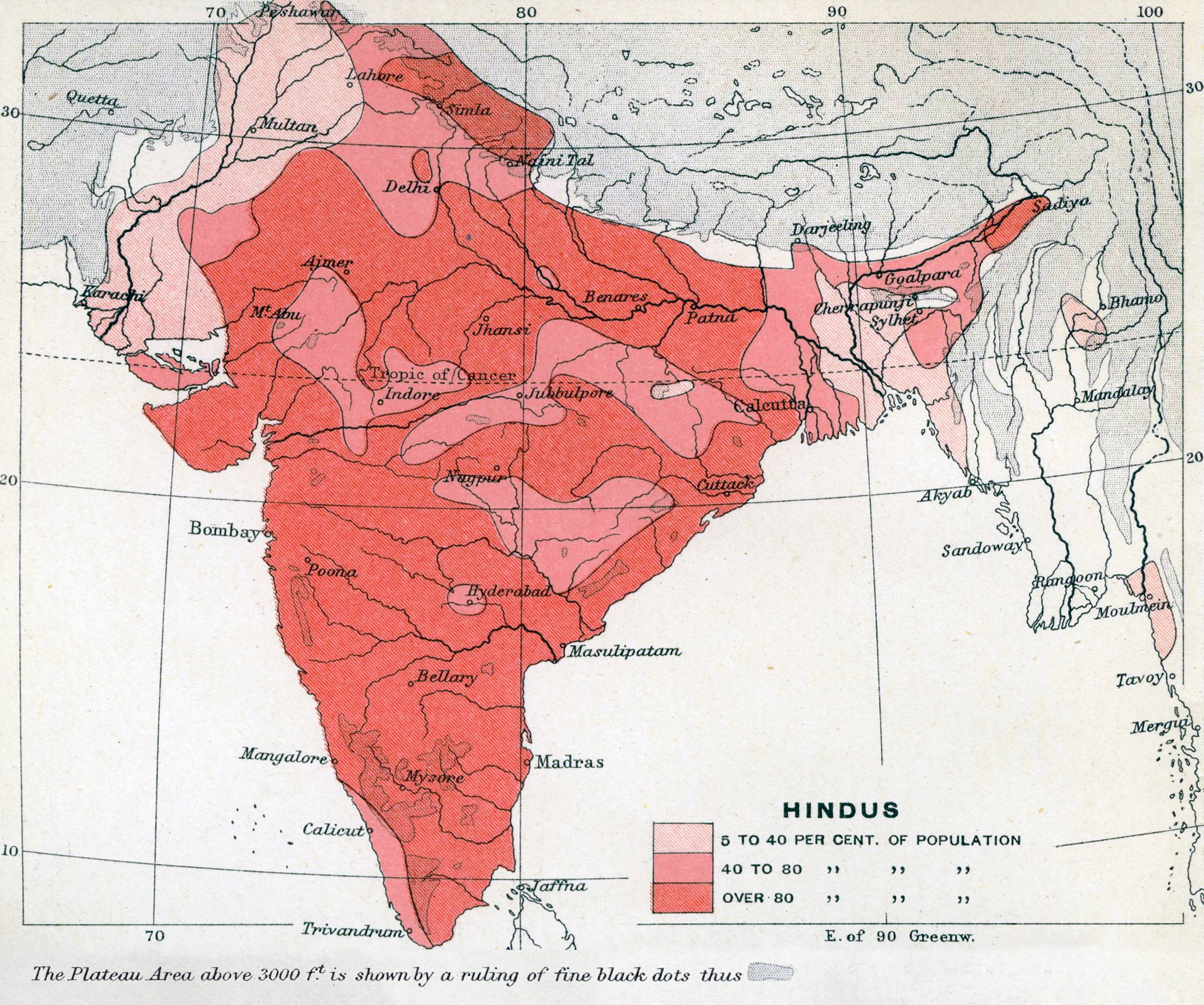
1909 Percentage of Hindus.

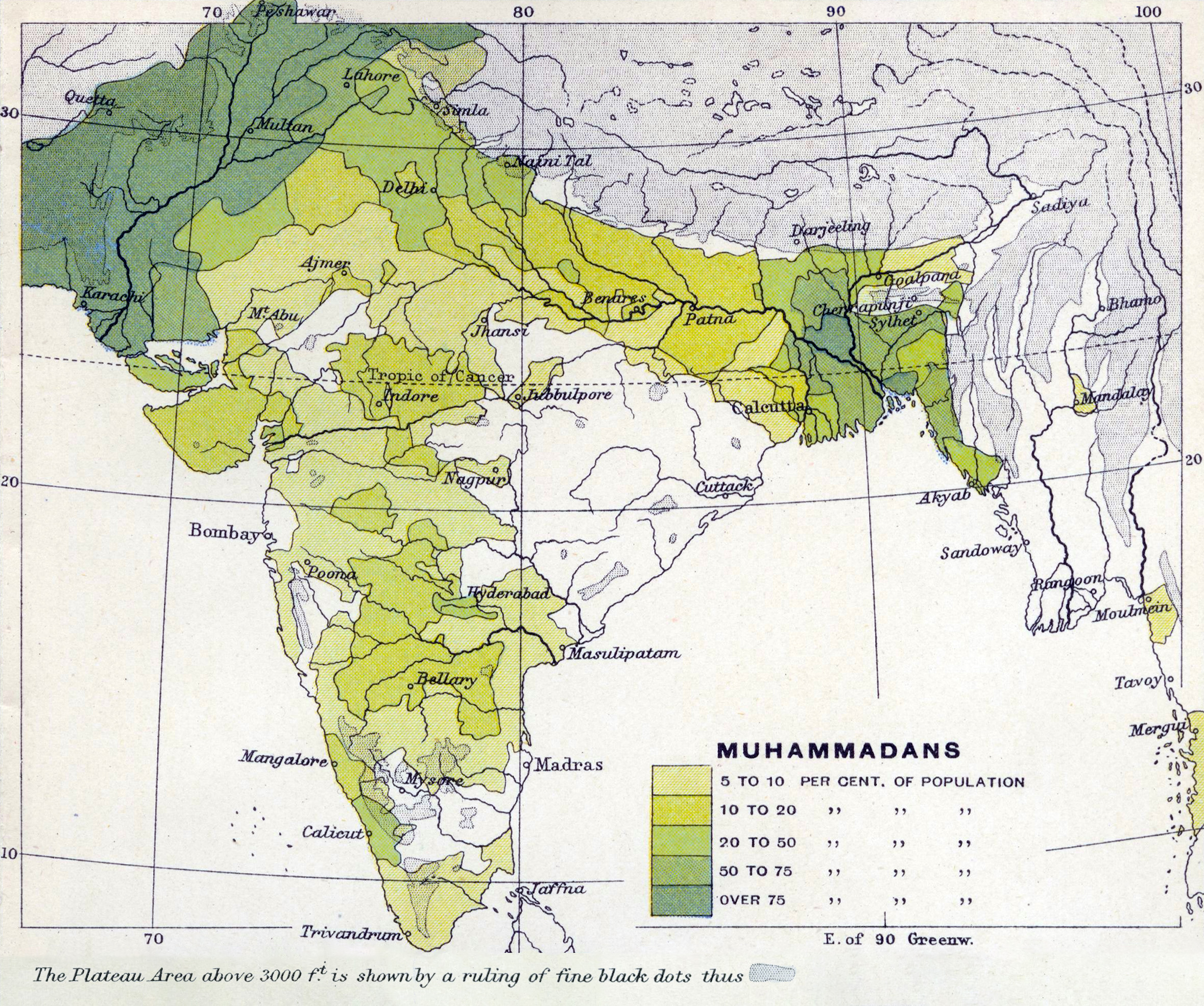
1909 Percentage of Muslims.

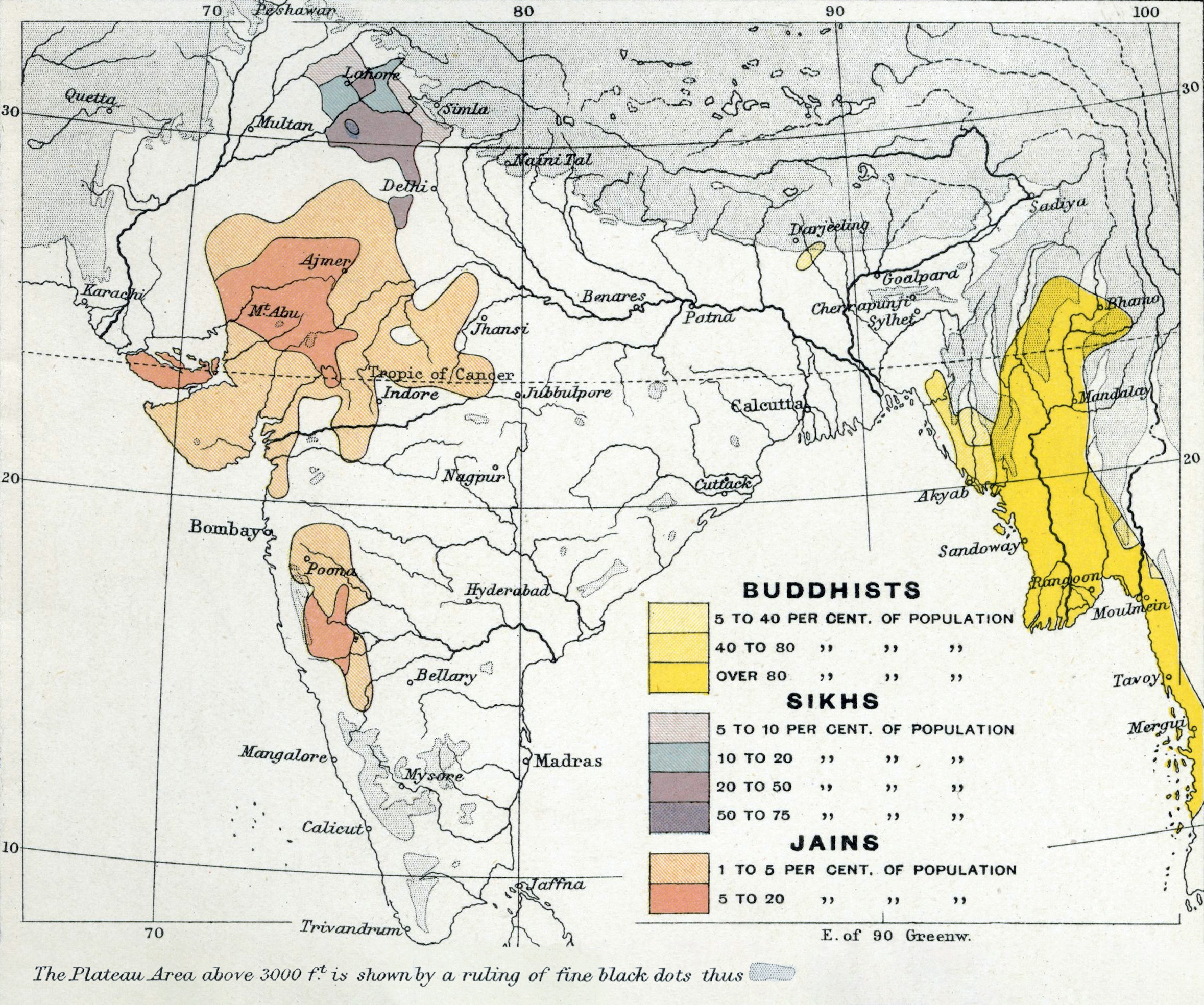
1909 Percentage of Sikhs and others.

The majority of the population movement associated with the Partition occurred in the period immediately before and after August 1947. Although many people did die in the religious violence, many also perished for reasons only indirectly related to violence. According to historical demographer Tim Dyson:

It is damning that the British authorities made few preparations to cope with vast numbers of refugees. Many people died from exhaustion, starvation, crowding, and in epidemics.

The systems of administration of the Punjab and Bengal were disrupted not only because of the turmoil but also the boundary changes. As a consequence, the systems in place for the registration of populations in the censuses were affected severely. Analysis of birth statistics in India suggests that most research on the demographic effects of the Partition are based on the 1931 and 1941 censuses of British India and some incomplete information from the 1951 censuses of India and Pakistan in both of which citizens were queried about Partition-related migrations. In addition, census data based on comparison of the 1941 and 1951 censuses, showed only long term effects; for example, in Bengal, it proved difficult to separate the effects of the Bengal famine of 1943 and the 1947 Partition. Still, one study by Bharadwaj, Khwaja, and Mian using 1951 census data has suggested that during the period 1947–1951 the Partition caused approximately 14.5 million people to migrate into (i.e. arrived in) India or Pakistan. The authors also estimated that during the same period 17.9 million people left India to go to Pakistan or vice versa, suggesting a figure of 3.4 million missing people. Refugee movement across the border in Bengal was a third of that in the northwest. 25% of Pakistani Punjab's population had come from India; 16% of Indian Punjab's population had come from Pakistan. In contrast, only 2% of the population of East Pakistan (as recorded in the 1951 census) had migrated from India. The disparity was chalked to the greater perception of the threat of violence in the Punjab.

Another study by Hill and colleagues suggested that migrants preferred to settle in districts with a high proportion of co-religionists, leading to more religiously homogeneous populations on either side of the newly drawn borders after Partition. In the Indian Punjab, districts that were 66% Hindu in 1941 became 80% Hindu in 1951; those that were 20% Sikh became 50% Sikh in 1951. In Pakistani Punjab, the districts became exclusively Muslim by 1951.

As for mortality, Bharadwaj and his colleagues divide the 3.4 million missing people by assigning 2.1 million to the northwest and 1.3 million to the east. Hill and colleagues suggested a mortality range of 2.3–3.2 million people. However, according to Dyson, the population losses may have also resulted in part because of reduced birth rates and also by the inadequacies in the 1951 census (especially in Pakistan).

Summing up Tim Dyson says,

The sudden refugee flows related to Partition may at the time have been unsurpassed in modern world history. It is likely that at least 14–18 million people moved. Previous assessments of the mortality associated with Partition have varied between 200,000 and 1 million. The first figure, attributed to Mountbatten (the last Viceroy) smacks of a number that—conveniently from an official perspective—minimises the loss of life. However, the figure of 1 million may also be too low. The data, however, do not allow for a firmer judgement.

== Economy and society ==
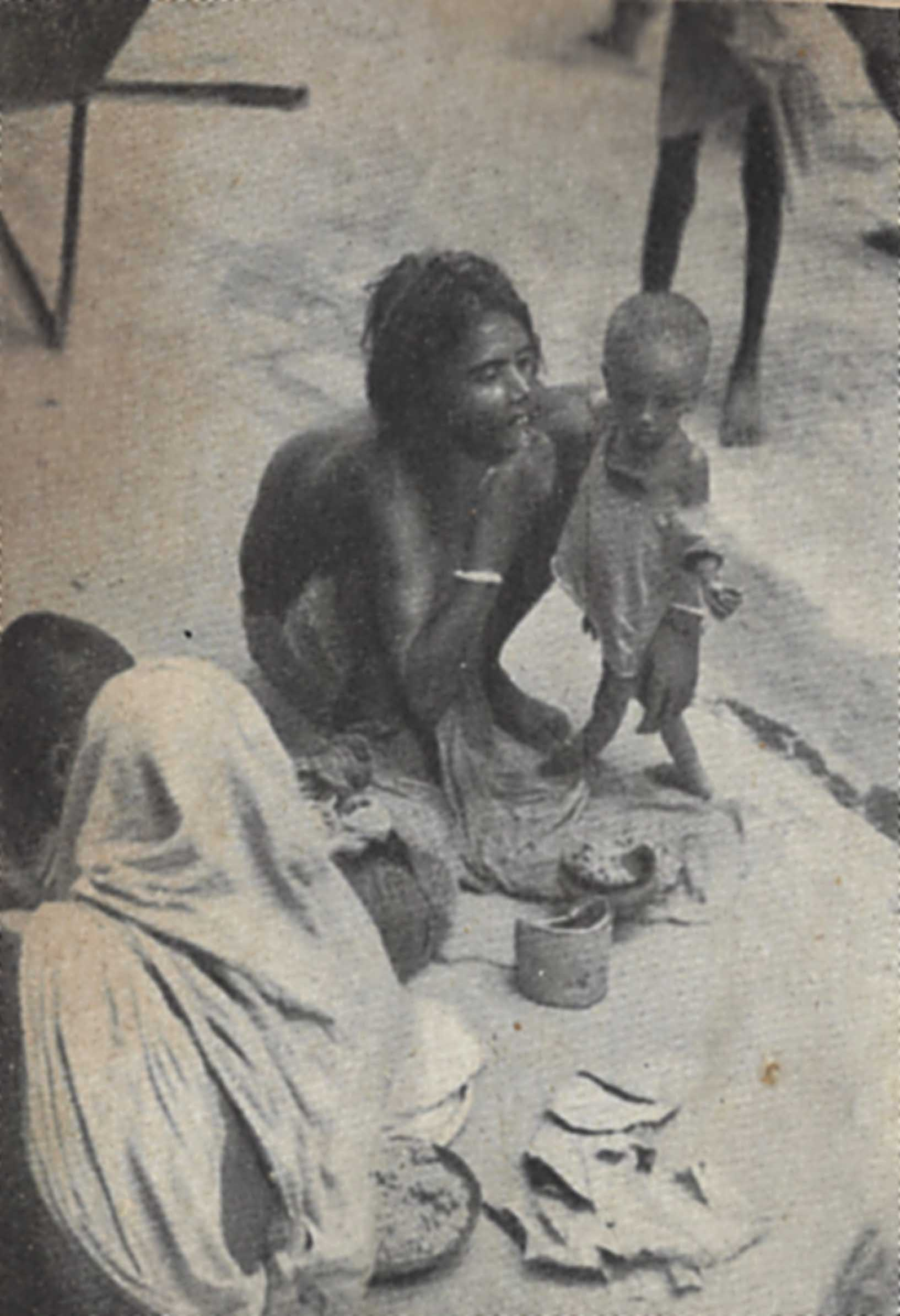
A destitute mother and child on the pavement in Calcutta during the Bengal famine of 1943.

The two main concerns of the new Indian government in 1947 were the economic foundations of the country and the poverty of a large segment of its population. Although the British Raj had also been concerned about poverty, its basic justification and the scale of the problem meant that it expended resources on poverty alleviation only when the distress seemed to be threatening civic order. The new government apprehended clearly that a low level of income and therefore also of demand and prospective investment considerably slowed down development in all areas of the economy, including agriculture, industry, and the service sector.

A National Income Committee was set up in 1949 to measure Indian poverty; its report published in 1950/1951 computed the average annual income per person in India to be Rs. 260 or $55. Some Indians earned less, especially among those who worked as domestic help, tenant farmers, or agricultural labourers.

According to historian Judith M. Brown, such poverty meant "almost perpetual hunger, a monotonous and unbalanced diet at the best of times, cramped and squalid housing, perhaps one change of meagre clothes, insufficient bedding to prevent deaths from cold in the northern Indian winter, children's absence from school for lack of clothes or books or the need to earn to feed the family and no money for doctors or medicines." The patriarchy widely prevalent in Indian society ensured that males had more access to food, medicine, and education than females.

In the agricultural sector in the 1940s, most farmers were engaged in subsistence farming; only a small fraction had access to tractors or tube wells; fertilizer use per acre was less than any other country. An India-wide survey soon after independence gave evidence of the high inequality in rural India. 14–15 million rural households (constituting 22% of the total) owned no land at all. Just under 50% of rural households owned 1.5% of the cultivated land. At the other extreme, the top 25% owned 83% of the cultivated land. Such magnitude of income inequality implied unequal access to education and health care. To meet the needs of those with the least access, the provision of physicians, nurses, rural clinics, hospitals, schools, and colleges also required special attention from the new government.

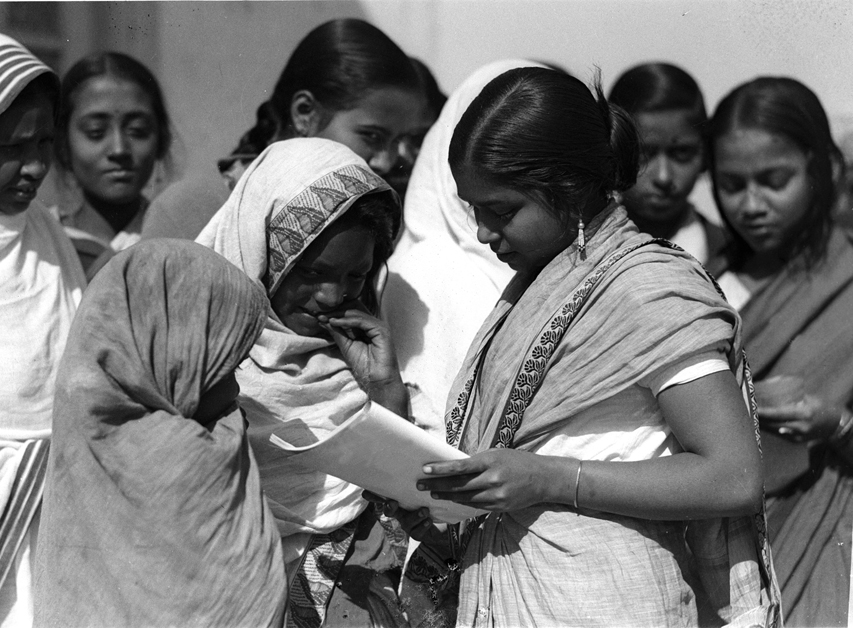
Literacy day in India, 1947

India did have a firmly founded industrial sector at the time of independence, with financial networks to sustain it. India's participation in the Second World War expanded its industries, though their increased output was not generally for civilian consumption. In some instances such as woollen textiles produced in wool mills, leather and footwear produced in factories, almost three-fourths of the cement and steel, the output was siphoned off from the civilian economy for military use. A few industries such as steel, chemicals, paper, paint, and cement did advance vigorously, but a shortage of capital goods and skilled human resources thwarted any significant new industrial undertakings. Sociologically, industrial growth in wartime increased the share of the urban population in India from 13% in 1941 to 16% in 1951.

The levels of education and evaluation criteria varied from region to region, depending on each region's history, its urbanization, and average per-person income. In 1951 literacy in India was still very low, especially among rural women (Table). Improving the economy, changing social attitudes, and reducing economic deprivation among the landless labouring classes depended crucially upon improving education standards.

Literacy in India 1951
| Areas | Men | Women |
|---|---|---|
| All areas | 23.54% | 7.62% |
| Rural areas | 19.02% | 4.87% |
| Urban areas | 45.05% | 12.34% |

The new government had inherited problems arising from uneven opportunity in a society of great want. Most deprived were groups whose status in Hindu society was low. Despite progress in women's education and the rise of some women in politics through Gandhi's civil disobedience movement, the vast majority of women, who happened to be from rural areas, spent their lives attending to their husbands to whom they had been married at an early age in arranged marriages, their children, and the crops. If a Hindu woman's marriage was unhappy, neither divorce nor even separation was an option legally or culturally. Patrilineal inheritance meant that women had no right to property; their only avenue to prosperity lay through dependence on their husbands. Little or no education, for the most part, barred them from becoming secretaries, teachers or nurses.

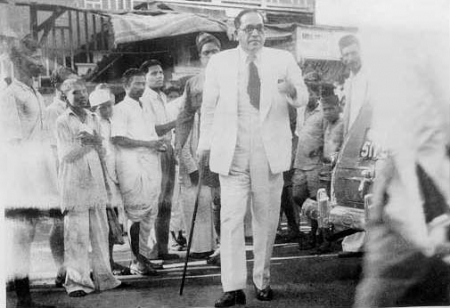
Untouchables leader, B. R. Ambedkar, chairman, Drafting Committee, Constitution of India, at the premiere of the film Paro (Story of an Untouchable girl), West End Theatre, Bombay, 1949

Similarly, despite Gandhi's anti-untouchability campaigns of the 1930s, the vast majority of Untouchables remained in extreme poverty, often forced to live in the most polluted environments while systematically denied land ownership, education, and skilled work. According to Judith M. Brown, "The new government recognised the burden of its inheritance in these areas of society and the 1950 constitution stated its commitment to fundamental change and a denial of Hindu conventions which an alien government had not dared to initiate." Although Untouchability was abolished in the new constitution, it was soon evident that the yoke of culture bore down so oppressively on Untouchables, that more legislation, administrative reform, and economic change were needed for them to assume their constitutional rights; the same was true of women. However, in urban areas, economic changes in the 1940s had demonstrated that belief and ritual status in Hinduism had hindered neither industrialisation, nor workers responding quickly to market forces, and changing occupations or locations of work.

== Gallery ==
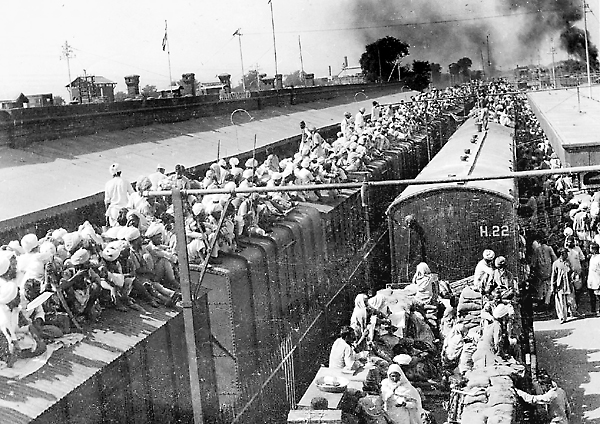
Emergency trains crowded with desperate refugees

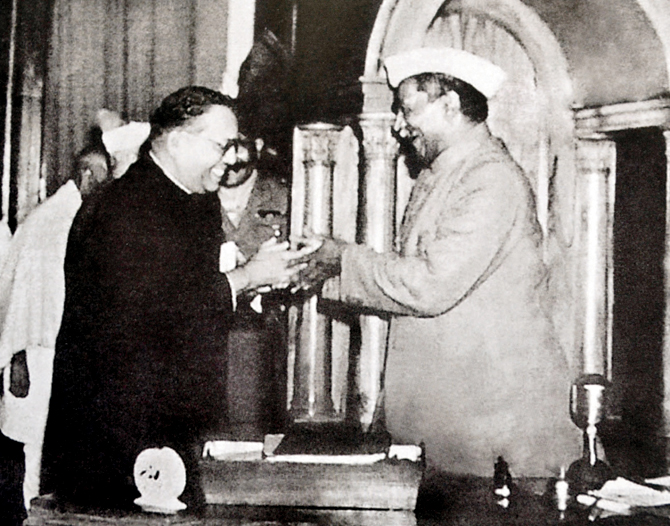
B. R. Ambedkar, presenting the final draft of the Constitution of India to Rajendra Prasad, president of the Constituent Assembly of India, 25 November 1949

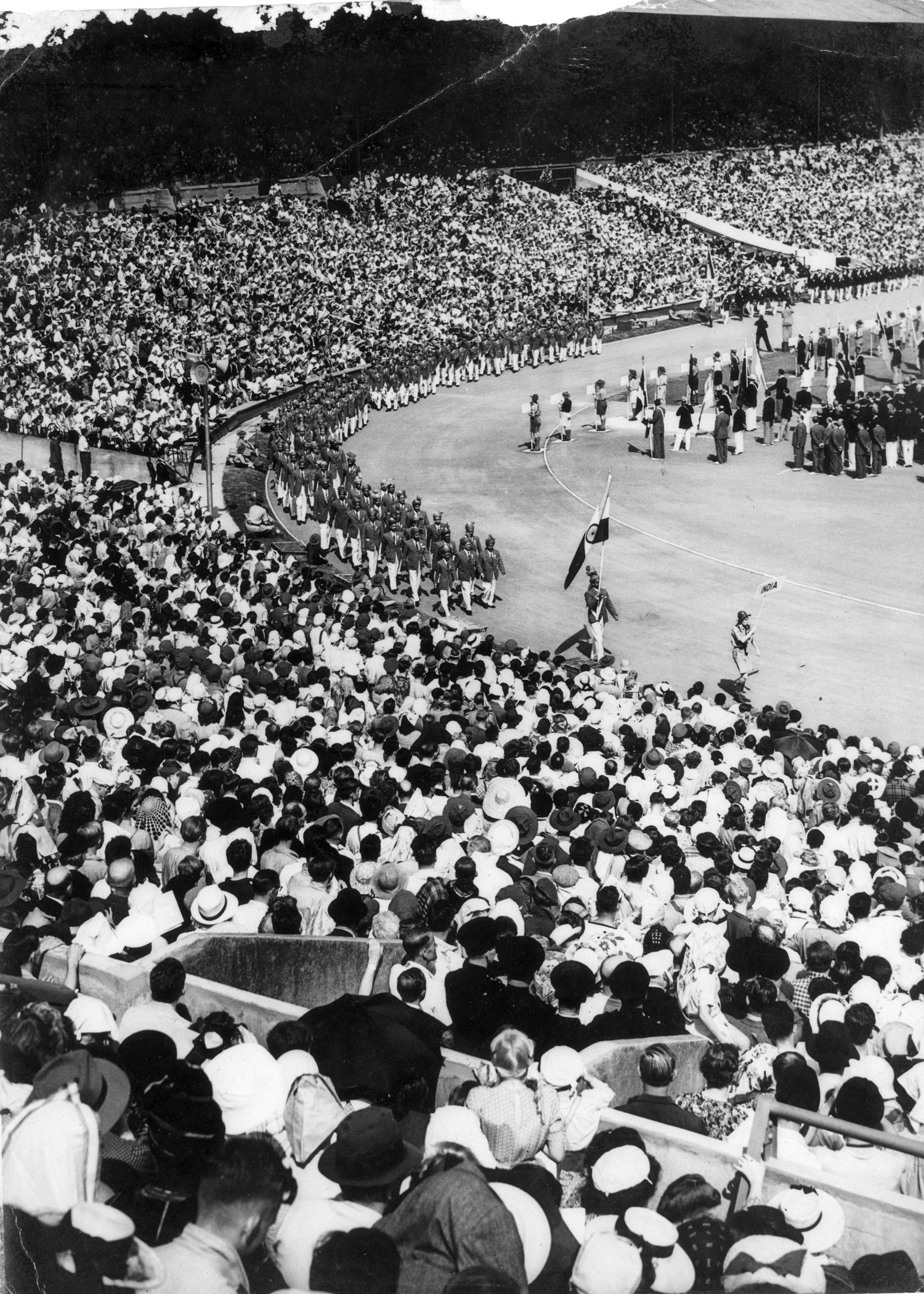
The Indian contingent marching at the 1948 London Olympics. India won the gold medal in Field Hockey

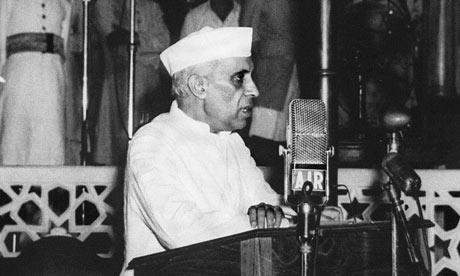
Jawaharlal Nehru delivering his 'Tryst with Destiny' speech at Parliament House in New Delhi during the midnight session of the Constituent Assembly on 14–15 August 1947

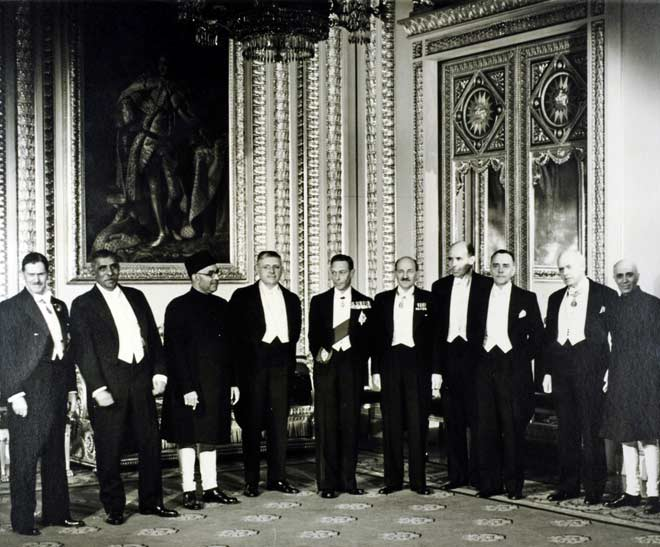
Prime ministers of the Commonwealth with King George VI (5th fr left), London 13 October 1948; Don Stephen Senanayake, Ceylon (2nd fr left); Liaquat Ali Khan, Pakistan (3rd fr left); Clement Attlee (UK, 5th fr right) and Jawaharlal Nehru of India (far right).

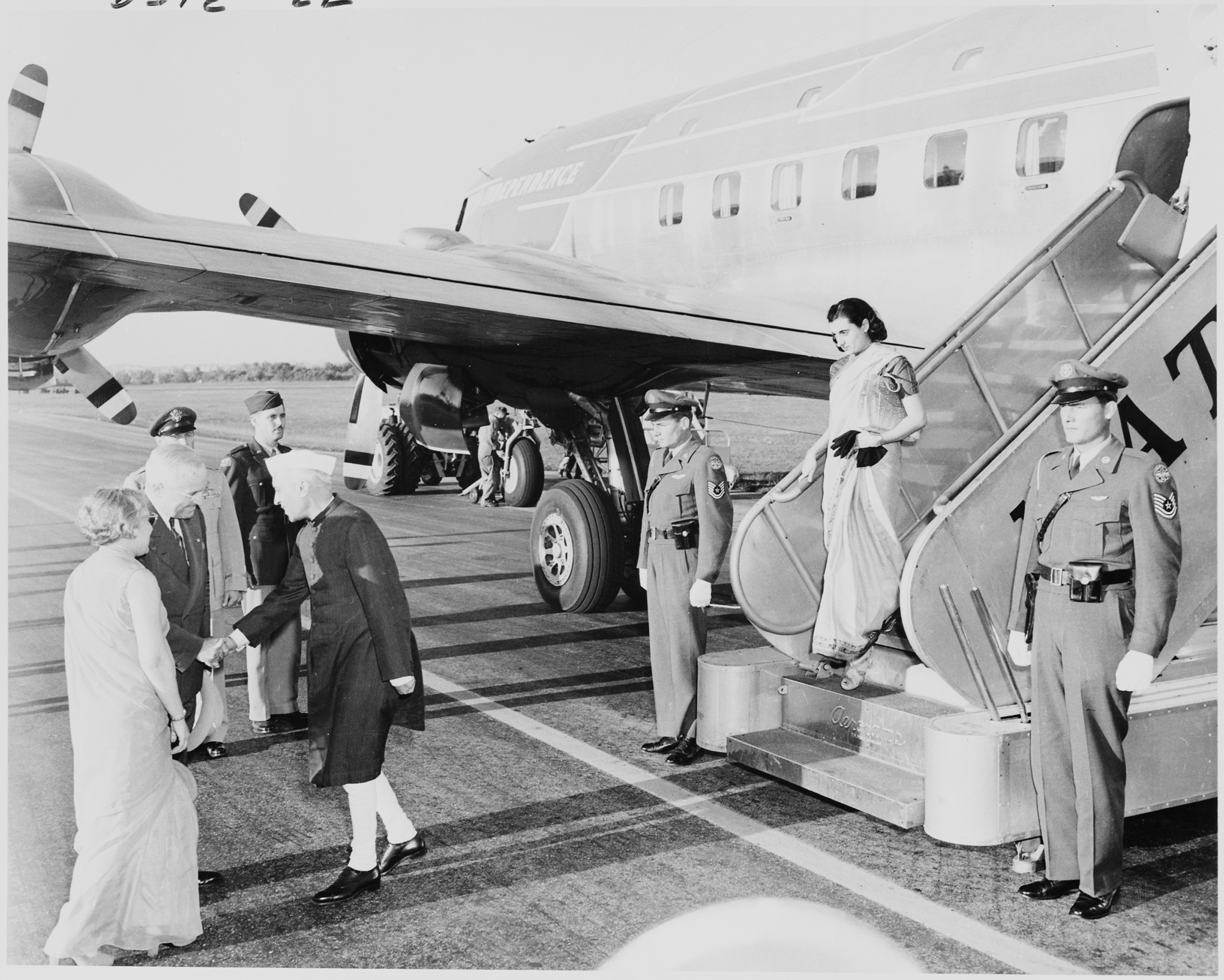
Nehru being received at the Washington National Airport by the President Harry S. Truman, 11 October 1949

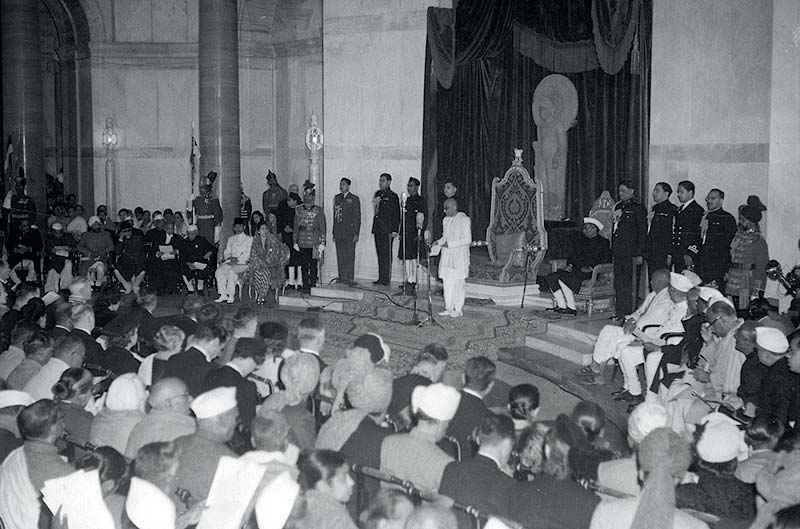
Governor-General Rajagopalachari declares India a Republic at Darbar Hall on 26 January 1950

== Bibliography ==
- Asif, Manan Ahmed (2020). The Loss of Hindustan: The Invention of India. Cambridge, MA and London: Harvard University Press. ISBN 9780674249868.
- Bandyopādhyāẏa, Śekhara (2004), From Plassey to partition: a history of modern India, Delhi: Orient Blackswan, ISBN 978-81-250-2596-2
- Bose, S.; Jalal, A. (2011), Modern South Asia: History, Culture, Political Economy (3rd ed.), Routledge, ISBN 978-0-415-77942-5
- Brown, J. M. (1994), Modern India: The Origins of an Asian Democracy, The Short Oxford History of the Modern World (2nd ed.), Oxford University Press, ISBN 978-0-19-873113-9
- Coningham, Robin; Young, Ruth (2015). Archaeology of South Asia: From Indus to Asoka, c. 6500 BCE–200 CE. Cambridge World Archaeology Series. New York: Cambridge University Press. p. 465. ISBN 978-0-521-84697-4.
- Copland, I. (2001), India 1885–1947: The Unmaking of an Empire (1st ed.), Longman, ISBN 978-0-582-38173-5
- Dyson, Tim (2018), A Population History of India: From the First Modern People to the Present Day, Oxford University Press, ISBN 978-0-19-882905-8
- Judd, Denis (2004), The Lion and the Tiger: The Rise and Fall of the British Raj, 1600–1947, Oxford and New York: Oxford University Press. Pp. xiii, 280, ISBN 978-0-19-280358-0.
- Kulke, H.; Rothermund, D. (2004), A History of India, 4th, Routledge, ISBN 978-0-415-32920-0
- Ludden, D. (2002), India and South Asia: A Short History, One World, ISBN 978-1-85168-237-9
- Mallot, J. Edward (2012), Memory, Nationalism, and Narrative in Contemporary South Asia, Palgrave Macmillan, pp. 75–, ISBN 978-1-137-00705-6
- Mann, Michael (2014), South Asia's Modern History: Thematic Perspectives, Routledge, ISBN 9781317624455
- Markovits, Claude (2004), The UnGandhian Gandhi: The Life and Afterlife of the Mahatma, Anthem Press, ISBN 978-1-84331-127-0
- Metcalf, B.; Metcalf, T. R. (2006), A Concise History of Modern India (2nd ed.), Cambridge University Press, ISBN 978-0-521-68225-1
- Robb, P. (2001), A History of India, London: Palgrave, ISBN 978-0-333-69129-8
- Sarkar, S. (1983), Modern India: 1885–1947, Delhi: Macmillan India, ISBN 978-0-333-90425-1
- Spear, Percival (1990) [1978], History of India, Volume 2: From the sixteenth century to the twentieth century, Penguin, ISBN 978-0-140-13836-8
- Stein, B. (1998), A History of India (1st ed.), Oxford: Wiley-Blackwell, ISBN 978-0-631-20546-3
- Stein, B. (2010), Arnold, D. (ed.), A History of India (2nd ed.), Oxford: Wiley-Blackwell, ISBN 978-1-4051-9509-6
- Talbot, Ian (2016), A History of Modern South Asia: Politics, States, Diasporas, Yale University Press, ISBN 9780300216592
- Talbot, Ian; Singh, Gurharpal (2009), The Partition of India, Cambridge University Press, ISBN 978-0-521-85661-4
- Talbot, Ian. 2006. Divided Cities: Partition and Its Aftermath in Lahore and Amritsar 1947–1957. Oxford and Karachi: Oxford University Press. 350 pages. ISBN 0-19-547226-8.
- Vajpeyi, Ananya (2012). Righteous Republic: The Political Foundations of Modern India. Cambridge MA and London: Harvard University Press. pp. 188–189. ISBN 978-0-674-04895-9.
- Wolpert, S. (2003), A New History of India (7th ed.), Oxford University Press, ISBN 978-0-19-516678-1
