= Ravi Inder Singh (industrialist) =

Indian politician and industrialist

Sardar Ravi Inder Singh Dummna (born 25 March 1940) is an industrialist, former Speaker of the Punjab Vidhan Sabha. He was elected five times as a Member of the Punjab Legislative Assembly from Morinda. He is an engineering graduate from I.I.T. Kharagpur Later he was awarded the Master of Business Administration (MBA) degree (M.B.A.) from Harvard University.

He is the grandson of Sardar Indra Singh ‒ the steel magnate, and the son of Sardar Ajaib Singh. Singh is the nephew of Sardar Baldev Singh ‒ the first Defence Minister of Independent India. Sardar Baldev Singh was a close confidant of Nehru and is still widely known as the wealthiest Sikh man.
