= Baldev Singh =

Indian entrepreneur and politician (1901-1961)

Sardar Baldev Singh
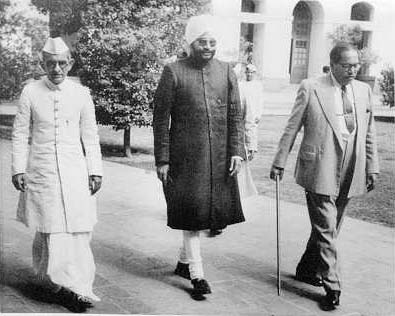
- Baldev Singh (C) with Babasaheb Ambedkar (R) and K. M. Munshi (L) on the Greeneries of Indian Parliament in 1949

1st Minister of Defence
- In office 15 August 1947 – 13 May 1952
- Prime Minister: Jawaharlal Nehru
- Preceded by: Position established
- Succeeded by: N. Gopalaswami Ayyangar

Member of Parliament, Lok Sabha
- In office 1957–19
- Preceded by: Diwan Chand Sharma
- Succeeded by: Amar Nath
- Constituency: Hoshiarpur, Punjab
- In office 1952–1957
- Preceded by: Position established
- Succeeded by: Constituency abolished
- Constituency: Nawan Shahr, Punjab

Member of the Constituent Assembly
- In office 1946–1950
- Constituency: East Punjab

Minister for Development, Government of Punjab
- In office 1942–1946

Member of the Punjab Provincial Assembly
- In office 1936–1946

Personal details
- Born: 11 July 1902 Rupar, Punjab, British Raj (now India)
- Died: 29 June 1961 (aged 58) Delhi, India
- Party: Indian National Congress; Shiromani Akali Dal; Akali Dal
- Education: Khalsa College

Baldev Singh (Punjabi: ਬਲਦੇਵ ਸਿੰਘ,Hindi: बलदेव सिंह) (11 July 1902 – 29 June 1961) was an Indian Sikh political leader, he was an Indian independence movement leader and the first Defence Minister of India. Moreover, he represented the Punjabi Sikh community in the processes of negotiations that resulted in the independence of India, as well as the Partition of India in 1947.

After independence, Baldev Singh was chosen to become the first Minister of Defence, and served in this post during the First Kashmir War between India and Pakistan. He was addressed often with the title of Sardar, which in Punjabi and Hindi means leader or chief.

== Early life and political career ==
Baldev Singh was born on 11 July 1902 in the village of Dumna in a Jat family in the Rupar district of Punjab. His father was Sardar Bahadur Sir Indra Singh, a reputed steel industrialist, and his mother was Nihal Kaur Singh (of village Manpur). His family was related to the Badal family through two lines; one being to Teja Singh Badal and one to Surjeet Singh. Ajaib Singh was married to the Faridkot royal family, and his son was married to the Bushahr royal family. Sardar Baldev Singh’s nephew is Ravi Inder Singh, a prominent politician in Punjab.

He was educated initially at Kainaur and subsequently at the Khalsa College in Amritsar, and began working in his father's firm in the steel industry. He rose to the position of director of the firm. He was married to Hardev Kaur of village Jallanpur in Punjab. They had two sons, Sarjit Singh and Gurdip Singh.

Baldev Singh won an election to the Punjab provincial assembly under the Government of India Act 1935 in 1937, as a candidate of the Panthic Party. He became closely linked with Master Tara Singh and the Shiromani Akali Dal.

== Cripps Mission and World War II ==
When the Cripps Mission arrived in India in 1942 to offer Indians some form of self-government, Baldev Singh was chosen to represent the Sikh community in the talks, which also included the chief Indian political party, the Indian National Congress and Muslim League party. The Mission failed to make any progress.

While the Congress Party launched the Quit India Movement, Baldev Singh and other Sikh leaders did not support it. Singh negotiated an agreement with Sir Sikandar Hyat Khan, the leader of the Unionist Party to form a government in Punjab, and became the provincial Development Minister for a brief time in the summer of 1942.

== Cabinet Mission and government ==
Baldev Singh was chosen again to represent the Sikh viewpoint to the Cabinet Mission Plan that had arrived to discuss proposals for Indian political independence. Singh reiterated the Sikh view that India should remain a united country with special protections for the rights of religious minorities. Singh also insisted that should partition become inevitable, the division of the Punjab should happen in a way to offer territorial protection to the Sikhs from Muslim domination.

Although Baldev Singh and other Sikhs initially opposed the implementation of the Mission's 16 May scheme, on the grounds that it did not offer any protection to the Sikh community, Baldev Singh joined the new Viceroy's Executive Council, to be headed by Congress leaders Jawaharlal Nehru and Vallabhai Patel as the Sikh member. Singh became the Defence Member, a post erstwhile held by the British Commander in Chief of the Indian Army. However, by early 1947, it was clear that the interim government would not work, owing to the conflict between the Congress Party and the Muslim League.

== Partition of India ==
Although Baldev Singh and other Sikhs initially opposed the implementation of the Mission's 16 May scheme, in the grounds that it did not offer any protection to the Sikh community, Baldev Singh joined the new Viceroy's Executive Council, to be headed by Congress leaders Jawaharlal Nehru and Vallabhbhai Patel as the Sikh member. Singh became the Defence minister.

== As defence minister ==
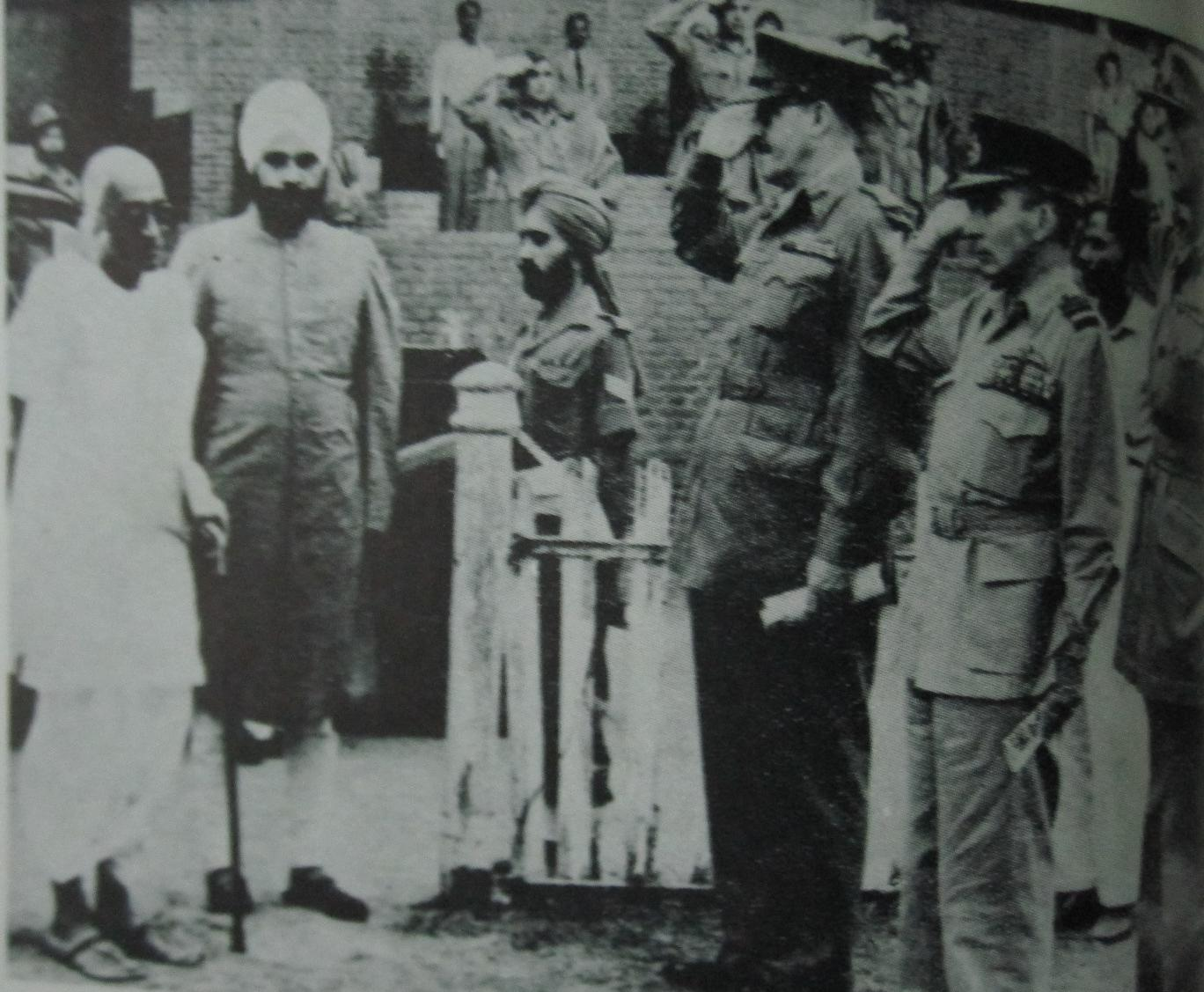
Baldev Singh with C. Rajagopalachari and Chiefs of Staff

On 15 August 1947, India became an independent nation and Baldev Singh became India's first Minister of Defence, under the first Prime Minister of India, Jawaharlal Nehru. Singh was also a member of the Constituent Assembly of India.

Along with Vallabhbhai Patel, the Home Minister, Singh became responsible for leading the Indian Army's efforts to provide security, relief and refuge to over 10 million Hindus and Sikhs who were leaving the newly created Pakistan. Terrible violence broke loose on both sides of the frontier along the Punjab and Bengal, and to date it is estimated that over 1 million people were killed, with millions more suffering from usual acts of cruelty and great physical and personal trauma from the migration.

The Army was caught unprepared, and itself was torn apart by the conflict. Thousands of Muslim officers were leaving for Pakistan. Riots had broken out in Calcutta, Delhi and Bombay. Patel and Singh led from the front, and despite a heavy toll, the Army finally re-asserted peace and rule of law all over India and the borders of Punjab and Bengal. They organized massive relief and aid operation for the millions of people arriving in India.

Defence Minister Singh also led the preparations and planning for the war in Jammu and Kashmir, which had broken out with Pakistani tribesmen and some military officers had made an incursion into the state with the aim of annexing it into Pakistan. Over almost two years, the Indian Army would wage battle with the militants and the Pakistan Army at the highest altitudes in the world. The Army succeeded in pushing back the raiders and captured most of the contested territory. On 28 November 1948, General Roy Bucher had advised Prime Minister Jawaharlal Nehru to agree to a ceasefire because "overall military decision was no longer possible". Bucher in his interview with B.R. Nanda had said that Baldev Singh finally informed him on 31 December to agree with the ceasefire.

In September 1948, Baldev Singh and his commanders prepared plans for Operation Polo, an operation that annexed the princely state of Hyderabad into the Indian Union. Singh remained a close advisor on managing the Kashmir conflict and the issues of political integration of India.

After the 1952 elections of India, Singh was succeeded by N. Gopalaswami Ayyangar as defence minister.

== Later life ==
In 1952, Baldev Singh was elected to the Parliament of India as a member of the Indian National Congress, in the first democratic elections under the new Constitution of India. However, he did not join the Nehru administration. Singh remained the major political representative of the Sikh concerns and was respected by the Akali Dal. He was re-elected to the Parliament in 1957.

Singh died in Delhi after a prolonged illness in 1961.

== Family ==
Singh had two sons, Sarjit Singh (1927–1993 AD) and Gurdip Singh. Sarjit Singh was the Co-operatives minister in the government of Parkash Singh Badal. He was married to Raj Mohinder Kaur and is survived by his son TejBal Singh and his daughter Jaspreet Kaur. Gurdip Singh was married to Baljit Kaur and had 4 children. Baldev Singh had 7 great grandchildren. His nephew Ravi Inder Singh was the Speaker of the Punjab Vidhan Sabha.

== See also ==
- History of the Punjab
- Indian independence movement
- Partition of India
- Shiromani Akali Dal
- Tara Singh Malhotra
