= Panthic Party =

1940s political party in India

The Panthic Party (Punjabi: ਪੰਥਕ ਪਾਰਟੀ) was a political party in India in the 1940s that focused on the Sikhs. Sardar Swaran Singh and Baldev Singh were prominent members of this party, both of which later joined Indian National Congress and rose to the status of cabinet minister in the Union Government of India.
