= Percival Spear =

British historian of modern South Asia

Thomas George Percival Spear OBE (1901–1982) was a British historian of modern South Asia, in particular of its colonial period. He taught at both Cambridge University and St. Stephen's College, Delhi.

== Personal life and education ==
Born in Bath in 1901, Percival Spear attended Monkton Combe School and later St Catharine's College, Cambridge, where he studied history. He spent some of his time there rowing in the Cambridge rowing team. He thereafter went to India and taught European and English history at St. Stephen's College, Delhi from 1924 to 1940.

In 1943 Spear became a deputy secretary to the government of India in the department of information and broadcasting. He also served for a time in 1944 as a government whip in the Federal Assembly, the precursor to independent India's Parliament.

After the war, Spear returned to Cambridge, becoming a Fellow and Bursar of Selwyn College and later a university lecturer in South Asian History. He spent a year at the University of California, Berkeley on a visiting professorship.

Percival Spear was awarded the Order of Merit (OBE) in the 1946 New Year Honours.

== Writings ==
In his book Master of Bengal: Clive and his India, Percival Spear wrote, "The dominion of Bengal was not desired in itself, but only as a safeguard for peaceful commercial operations ... Rule by legal fiction and by deputy was both safer and cheaper in the conditions of the time."

=== Selected bibliography ===
- A History of India Volume 2, 1956, ISBN 0140207708
- The Nabobs, 1932
- India, Pakistan and the West
- The Twilight of the Mughals
- India, a Modern History
