= 2014 Indian cabinet reshuffle =

Overview of the reshuffle of the First Modi ministry (2014)

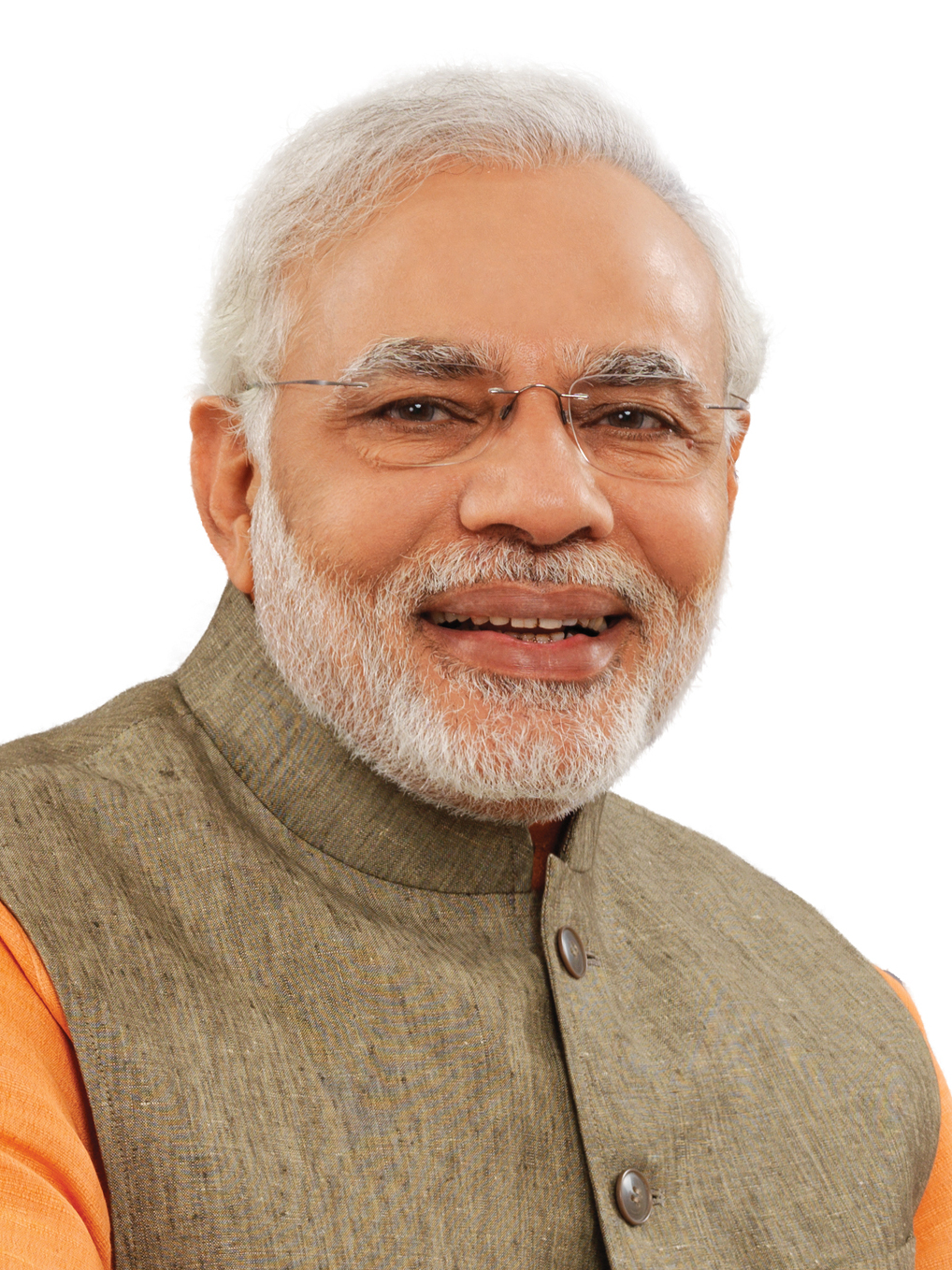
Prime Minister Narendra Modi

Indian Prime Minister Narendra Modi carried out the first reshuffle of his premiership on 9 November 2014 in which he expanded the initial composition of the ministry formed on 26 May 2014. Modi inducted four cabinet ministers, three ministers of state with independent charge, and fourteen ministers of state.

== Appointees ==
Former Goan Chief Minister Manohar Parrikar and Rajya Sabha MPs Suresh Prabhu, Jagat Prakash Nadda, and Chaudhary Birender Singh were appointed cabinet ministers. The ministers of state (independent charge) appointed were Bandaru Dattatreya, Rajiv Pratap Rudy, and Mahesh Sharma. The ministers of state were Mukhtar Abbas Naqvi, Ram Kripal Yadav, Haribhai Parthibhai Chaudhary, Sanwar Lal Jat, Mohan Kundariya, Giriraj Singh, Hansraj Gangaram Ahir, Ram Shankar Katheria, Y.S. Chowdary, Jayant Sinha, Rajyavardhan Singh Rathore, Babul Supriyo, Niranjan Jyoti, and Vijay Sampla.

== Cabinet-level changes ==
Colour key
- Joined the cabinet

Portrait	Name	Position before reshuffle	Position after reshuffle
	Arun Jaitley	Minister of Finance; Minister of Corporate Affairs; Minister of Defence	Minister of Finance; Minister of Corporate Affairs; Minister of Information and Broadcasting
	Nitin Gadkari	Minister of Road Transport and Highways; Minister of Shipping; Minister of Rural Development; Minister of Panchayati Raj; Minister of Drinking Water and Sanitation	Minister of Road Transport and Highways; Minister of Shipping
	Manohar Parrikar	None (Note: Chief Minister of Goa until 8 November 2014)	Minister of Defence
	Suresh Prabhu	None	Minister of Railways
	D. V. Sadananda Gowda	Minister of Railways	Minister of Law and Justice
	Ravi Shankar Prasad	Minister of Communications and Information Technology; Minister of Law and Justice	Minister of Communications and Information Technology
	Jagat Prakash Nadda	Rajya Sabha MP	Minister of Health and Family Welfare
	Narendra Singh Tomar	Minister of Mines; Minister of Steel; Minister of Labour and Employment	Minister of Mines; Minister of Steel
	Birender Singh	Rajya Sabha MP	Minister of Rural Development; Minister of Panchayati Raj; Minister of Drinking Water and Sanitation
	Harsh Vardhan	Minister of Health and Family Welfare	Minister of Science and Technology; Minister of Earth Sciences

== Minister of State-level changes ==
Colour key
- Joined the cabinet

Minister	Position before reshuffle	Position after reshuffle
General V. K. Singh (Retd)	Minister of State (Independent Charge) for Development of North Eastern Region; Minister of State for External Affairs; Minister of State for Overseas Indian Affairs	Minister of State (Independent Charge) for Statistics and Programme Implementation; Minister of State for External Affairs; Minister of State for Overseas Indian Affairs
Rao Inderjit Singh	Minister of State (Independent Charge) for Planning; Minister of State (Independent Charge) for Statistics and Programme Implementation; Minister of State for Defence	Minister of State (Independent Charge) for Planning; Minister of State for Defence
Santosh Kumar Gangwar	Minister of State (Independent Charge) for Textiles; Minister of State for Parliamentary Affairs; Minister of State for Water Resources, River Development and Ganga Rejuvenation	Minister of State (Independent Charge) for Textiles
Bandaru Dattatreya	Lok Sabha MP	Minister of State (Independent Charge) for Labour and Employment
Rajiv Pratap Rudy	Lok Sabha MP	Minister of State (Independent Charge) for Skill Development and Entrepreneurship; Minister of State for Parliamentary Affairs
Shripad Yesso Naik	Minister of State (Independent Charge) for Culture; Minister of State (Independent Charge) for Tourism	Minister of State (Independent Charge) for AYUSH; Minister of State for Health and Family Welfare
Sarbananda Sonowal	Minister of State (Independent Charge) for Skill Development, Entrepreneurship, Youth Affairs and Sports	Minister of State (Independent Charge) for Youth Affairs and Sports
Prakash Javadekar	Minister of State (Independent Charge) for Environment, Forest and Climate Change; Minister of State (Independent Charge) for Information and Broadcasting; Minister of State for Parliamentary Affairs	Minister of State (Independent Charge) for Environment, Forest and Climate Change
Jitendra Singh	Minister of State (Independent Charge) for Science and Technology; Minister of State (Independent Charge) for Earth Sciences; Minister of State in the Prime Minister's Office; Minister of State for Personnel, Public Grievances and Pensions; Minister of State for Department of Space; Minister of State for Department of Atomic Energy	Minister of State (Independent Charge) for Development of North Eastern Region; Minister of State in the Prime Minister's Office Minister of State for Personnel, Public Grievances and Pensions Minister of State for Department of Space Minister of State for Department of Atomic Energy
Nirmala Sitharaman	Minister of State (Independent Charge) for Commerce and Industry; Minister of State for Finance; Minister of State for Corporate Affairs	Minister of State (Independent Charge) for Commerce and Industry
Mahesh Sharma	Lok Sabha MP	Minister of State (Independent Charge) for Culture; Minister of State (Independent Charge) for Tourism; Minister of State for Civil Aviation
Mukhtar Abbas Naqvi	Rajya Sabha MP	Minister of State for Minority Affairs; Minister of State for Parliamentary Affairs
Ram Kripal Yadav	Lok Sabha MP	Minister of State for Drinking Water and Sanitation
Haribhai Parthibhai Chaudhary	Lok Sabha MP	Minister of State for Home Affairs
Sanwar Lal Jat	Lok Sabha MP	Minister of State for Water Resources, River Development and Ganga Rejuvenation
Mohan Kundariya	Lok Sabha MP	Minister of State for Agriculture
Giriraj Singh	Lok Sabha MP	Minister of State for Micro, Small and Medium Enterprises
Hansraj Gangaram Ahir	Lok Sabha MP	Minister of State for Chemicals and Fertilizers
G. M. Siddeshwara	Minister of State for Civil Aviation	Minister of State for Heavy Industries and Public Enterprises
Nihalchand	Minister of State for Chemicals and Fertilizers	Minister of State for Panchayati Raj
Upendra Kushwaha	Minister of State for Rural Development; Minister of State for Panchayati Raj; Minister of State for Drinking Water and Sanitation	Minister of State for Human Resource Development
Pon Radhakrishnan	Minister of State for Heavy Industries and Public Enterprises	Minister of State for Road Transport and Highways; Minister of State for Shipping
Krishan Pal	Minister of State for Road Transport and Highways; Minister of State for Shipping	Minister of State for Social Justice and Empowerment
Sanjeev Kumar Balyan	Minister of State for Agriculture; Minister of State for Food Processing Industries	Minister of State for Agriculture
Vishnu Deo Sai	Minister of State for Mines; Minister of State for Steel; Minister of State for Labour and Employment	Minister of State for Mines; Minister of State for Steel
Sudarshan Bhagat	Minister of State for Social Justice and Empowerment	Minister of State for Rural Development
Ram Shankar Katheria	Lok Sabha MP	Minister of State for Human Resource Development
Y. S. Chowdary	Rajya Sabha MP	Minister of State for Science and Technology; Minister of State for Earth Sciences
Jayant Sinha	Lok Sabha MP	Minister of State for Finance
Rajyavardhan Singh Rathore	Lok Sabha MP	Minister of State for Information and Broadcasting
Babul Supriyo	Lok Sabha MP	Minister of State for Urban Development; Minister of State for Housing and Urban Poverty Alleviation
Niranjan Jyoti	Lok Sabha MP	Minister of State for Food Processing Industries
Vijay Sampla	Lok Sabha MP	Minister of State for Social Justice and Empowerment
