= First Modi ministry =

Government of India (2014–2019)

- 24th Ministry of the Republic of India

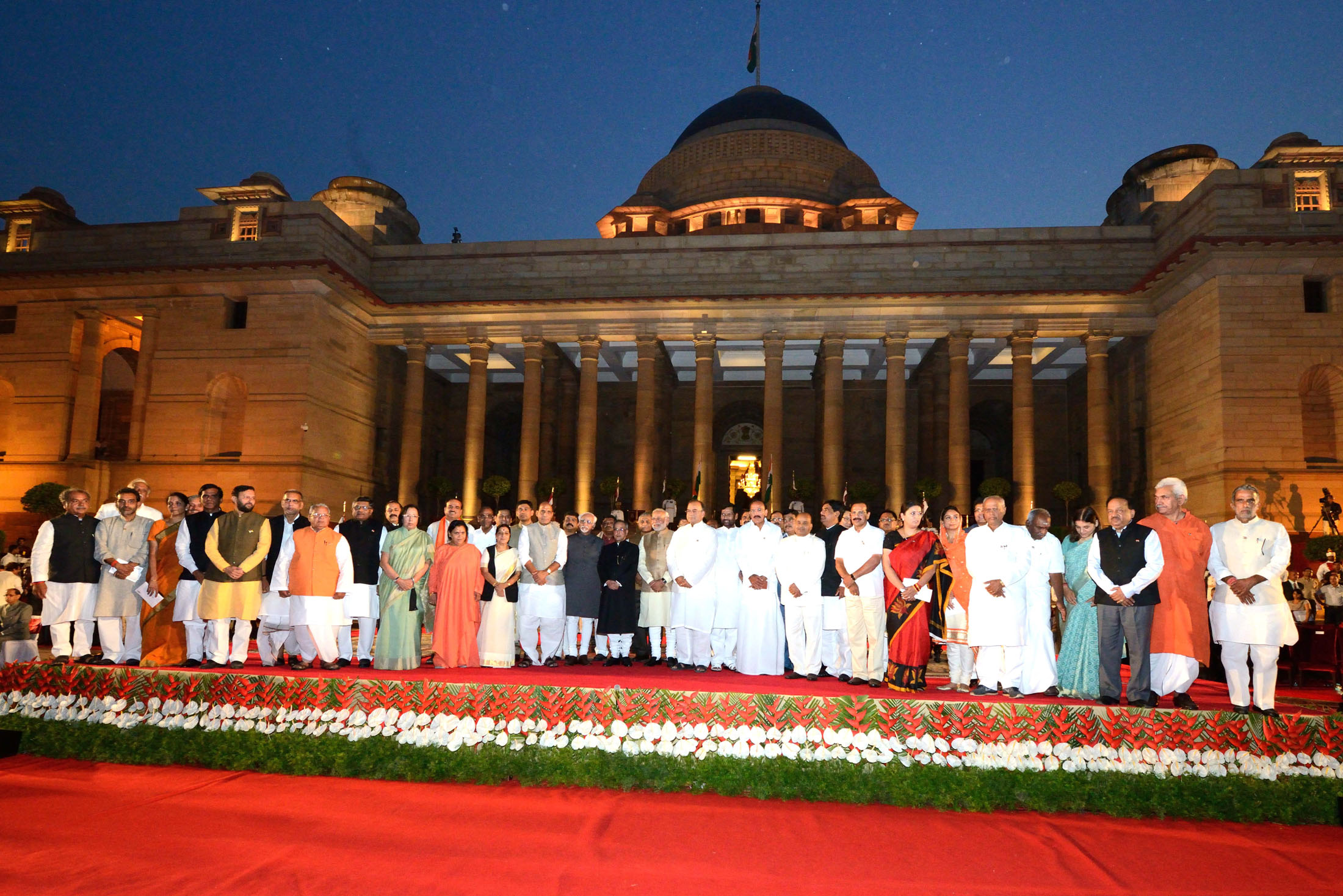
- Date formed: 26 May 2014
- Date dissolved: 30 May 2019

People and organisations
- Head of state: Pranab Mukherjee (until 25 July 2017); Ram Nath Kovind (from 25 July 2017)
- Head of government: Narendra Modi
- Head of government's history: Chief minister of Gujarat
- No. of ministers: 26 cabinet ministers 11 ministers of state (Independent Charge); 34 ministers of state
- Ministers removed: 24
- Total no. of members: 95
- Member parties: National Democratic Alliance: Bharatiya Janata Party; Lok Janshakti Party; Shiv Sena; Shiromani Akali Dal; Republican Party of India (Athawale); Apna Dal (Soneylal); Former: Telugu Desam Party (2014–2018); Rashtriya Lok Samta Party (2014–2018)
- Status in legislature: Majority
- Opposition party: Indian National Congress (upper house); None (Note: In the 2014 general election, no opposition party obtained the minimum (55) amount of seats to become the official opposition, and thus there was no opposition leader. Mallikarjun Kharge was the leader of the Indian National Congress Party in the assembly, which had the largest number (44) of seats in the opposition.) (Lower House)

History
- Incoming formation: 16th Lok Sabha
- Outgoing formation: 17th Lok Sabha
- Election: 2014
- Outgoing election: 2019
- Legislature terms: 5 years, 4 days
- Budgets: 2014 Budget; 2015 Budget; 2016 Budget; 2017 Budget; 2018 Budget; 2019 Budget (Interim)
- Predecessor: Second Manmohan Singh ministry
- Successor: Second Modi ministry

The First Narendra Modi ministry is the Council of Ministers headed by Narendra Modi that was formed after the 2014 general election which was held in nine phases from 7 April to 12 May in 2014. The results of the election were announced on 16 May 2014 and this led to the formation of the 16th Lok Sabha. The Council assumed office from 27 May 2014.

The Council of Ministers included 10 female ministers, of whom 6 held the rank of Cabinet minister. This is the highest number of female Cabinet ministers in any Indian government in history. The only other government to appoint more than 1 female Cabinet minister, was the first UPA government from 2004 to 2009, which had 3 female Cabinet Ministers.

== Background ==
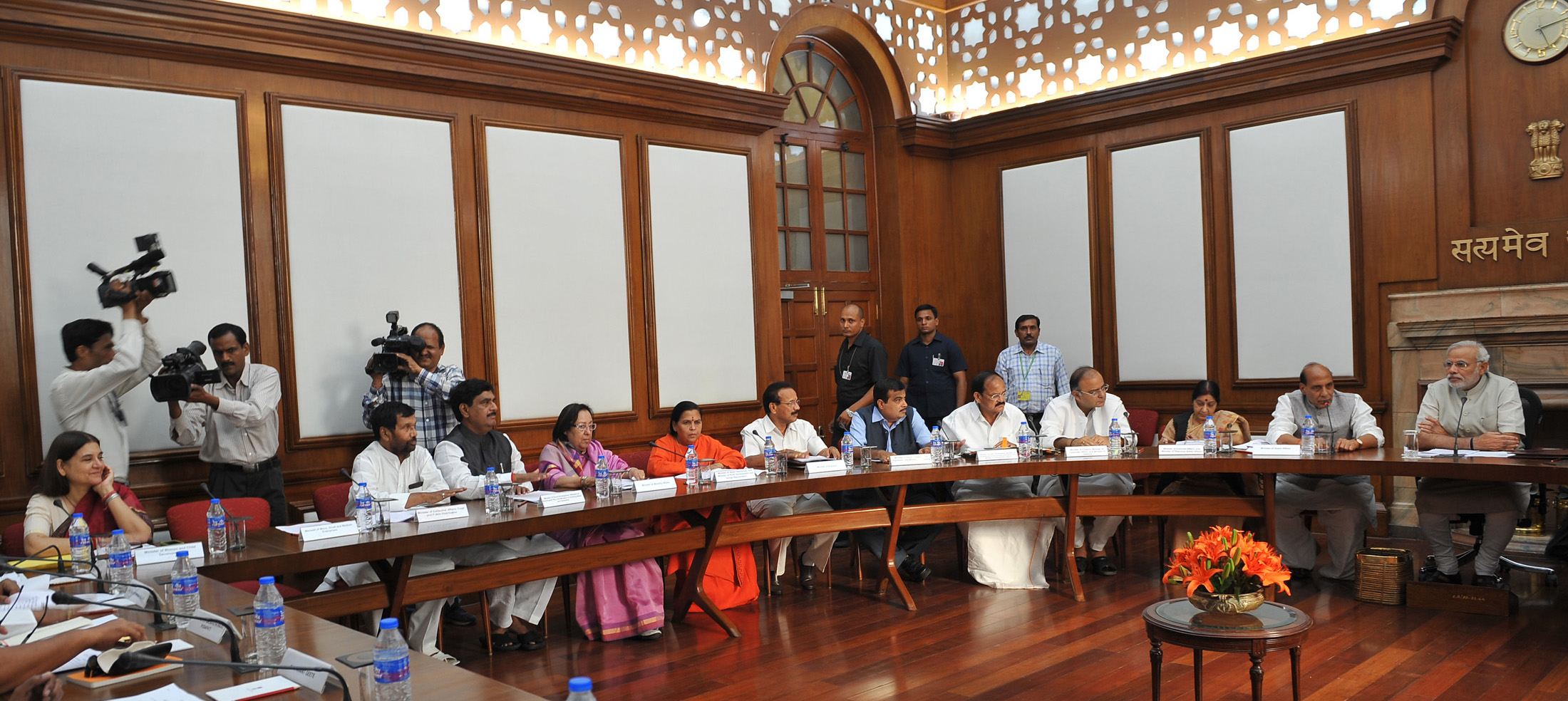
First meeting of the Modi cabinet, 27 May 2014.

The 2014 general election was held in nine phases from 7 April to 12 May, to constitute the 16th Lok Sabha. The results of the election were announced on 16 May 2014. On 20 May 2014, a meeting of the parliamentary party of BJP was organised at the Central Hall of the Parliament of India and Narendra Modi was elected as its leader. Subsequently, BJP president Rajnath Singh along with other leaders of the ally parties of NDA, met President Pranab Mukherjee at Rashtrapati Bhavan and handed over the support letter of 335 members of parliament and claimed for the government formation. Following this, Mukherjee invited Modi and under the powers vested on him under Constitution of India, appointed him as the Prime Minister of India and sought his advice for the names of the members of the council of ministers of his government. On 9 November 2014, there was an expansion and reshuffling in his cabinet and 21 new cabinet ministers were sworn in.

== History ==
Prime Minister Narendra Modi appointed Nripendra Misra as his Principal Secretary and Ajit Doval as National Security Advisor (NSA) in his first week in office. He also appointed IAS officer A.K. Sharma and Indian Forest Service officer Bharat Lal as joint secretaries in the Prime Minister's Office (PMO). Both officers were part of Modi's government in Gujarat during his tenure as Chief Minister.

On 31 May 2014, Prime Minister Modi abolished all existing Group of Ministers (GoMs) and Empowered Group of Ministers (EGoMs). A statement from the PMO explained, "This would expedite the process of decision making and usher in greater accountability in the system. The Ministries and Departments will now process the issues pending before the EGoMs and GoMs and take appropriate decisions at the level of Ministries and Departments itself". The UPA-II government had set up 68 GoMs and 14 EGoMs during its tenure, of which 9 EGoMs and 21 GoMs were inherited by the new government. The move was described by the Indian media as being in alignment with Modi's policy of "minimum government, maximum governance". The Indian Express stated that the GoMs and EGoMs had become "a symbol and an instrument of policy paralysis during the previous UPA government". The Times of India described the new government's decision as "a move to restore the authority of the Union Cabinet in decision-making and ensure ministerial accountability".

Newly appointed cabinet minister Gopinath Munde, who was in charge of the Rural Development, Panchayati Raj, and Drinking Water and Sanitation portfolios, died in a car crash in Delhi on 3 June 2014. Cabinet minister Nitin Gadkari, who is in charge of Road Transport and Highways, and Shipping, was assigned to look after Munde's portfolios on 4 June.

On 10 June 2014, in another step to downsize the government, Modi abolished four Standing Committees of the Cabinet. He also decided to reconstitute five crucial Cabinet Committees. These included the Cabinet Committee on Security (CCS) that handles all high-level defence and security matters, the Appointments Committee of Cabinet (ACC) that recommends to the President all senior bureaucratic appointments and postings, the Cabinet Committee on Political Affairs (CCPA) which is a sort of small cabinet and the Cabinet Committee on Parliamentary Affairs.

The Prime Minister and the Council of Ministers submitted their resignation to President Ram Nath Kovind on 24 May 2019, after the completion of their 5-year term. The President accepted the resignations and requested the Council of Ministers to continue until the new government assumed office.

== List of ministers ==
Council portfolios are as follows:

=== Cabinet Ministers ===
Portfolio	Minister	Took office	Left office	Party	Remarks
Prime Minister; Minister of Personnel, Public Grievances and Pensions; Department of Atomic Energy; Department of Space; All important policy issues; and All other portfolios not allocated to any Minister.	Narendra Modi	26 May 2014	30 May 2019	BJP	
Minister of Home Affairs	Rajnath Singh	27 May 2014	30 May 2019	BJP	
Minister of External Affairs	Sushma Swaraj	27 May 2014	30 May 2019	BJP	
Minister of Overseas Indian Affairs	Sushma Swaraj	27 May 2014	7 January 2016	BJP	Merged with Ministry of External Affairs.
Minister of Finance; Minister of Corporate Affairs	Arun Jaitley	27 May 2014	14 May 2018	BJP	
Minister of Finance; Minister of Corporate Affairs	Piyush Goyal (Acting)	14 May 2018	23 August 2018	BJP	Additional charge during period of indisposition of Arun Jaitley.
Minister of Finance; Minister of Corporate Affairs	Arun Jaitley	23 August 2018	23 January 2019	BJP	
Minister of Finance; Minister of Corporate Affairs	Piyush Goyal (Acting)	23 January 2019	15 February 2019	BJP	Additional charge during period of indisposition of Arun Jaitley.
Minister of Finance; Minister of Corporate Affairs	Arun Jaitley	15 February 2019	30 May 2019	BJP	
Minister of Defence	Arun Jaitley	27 May 2014	9 November 2014	BJP	
Minister of Defence	Manohar Parrikar	9 November 2014	13 March 2017	BJP	Resigned.
Minister of Defence	Arun Jaitley	13 March 2017	3 September 2017	BJP	Additional charge following resignation of Manohar Parrikar.
Minister of Defence	Nirmala Sitharaman	3 September 2017	30 May 2019	BJP	
Minister of Urban Development; Minister of Housing and Urban Poverty Alleviation	M. Venkaiah Naidu	27 May 2014	6 July 2017	BJP	The Ministry of Urban Development and Ministry of Housing and Urban Poverty Alleviation were merged to form the Ministry of Housing and Urban Affairs.
Minister of Housing and Urban Affairs	M. Venkaiah Naidu	6 July 2017	17 July 2017	BJP	Resigned.
Minister of Housing and Urban Affairs	Narendra Singh Tomar	17 July 2017	3 September 2017	BJP	Additional charge following resignation of M. Venkaiah Naidu.
Minister of Housing and Urban Affairs	Hardeep Singh Puri	3 September 2017	30 May 2019	BJP	MoS (I/C) was responsible.
Minister of Parliamentary Affairs	M. Venkaiah Naidu	27 May 2014	5 July 2016	BJP	
Minister of Parliamentary Affairs	Ananth Kumar	5 July 2016	12 November 2018	BJP	Died on 12 November 2018.
Minister of Parliamentary Affairs	Narendra Singh Tomar	13 November 2018	30 May 2019	BJP	Additional charge following demise of Ananth Kumar.
Minister of Road Transport and Highways; Minister of Shipping	Nitin Gadkari	27 May 2014	30 May 2019	BJP	
Minister of Railways	D. V. Sadananda Gowda	27 May 2014	9 November 2014	BJP	
Minister of Railways	Suresh Prabhu	9 November 2014	3 September 2017	BJP	
Minister of Railways	Piyush Goyal	3 September 2017	30 May 2019	BJP	
Minister of Water Resources, River Development and Ganga Rejuvenation	Uma Bharati	27 May 2014	3 September 2017	BJP	
Minister of Water Resources, River Development and Ganga Rejuvenation	Nitin Gadkari	3 September 2017	30 May 2019	BJP	
Minister of Minority Affairs	Najma Heptulla	27 May 2014	12 July 2016	BJP	Resigned.
Minister of Minority Affairs	Mukhtar Abbas Naqvi	12 July 2016	3 September 2017	BJP	MoS (I/C) was responsible.
Minister of Minority Affairs	Mukhtar Abbas Naqvi	3 September 2017	30 May 2019	BJP	
Minister of Rural Development; Minister of Panchayati Raj	Gopinath Munde	27 May 2014	3 June 2014	BJP	Died in an accident on 3 June 2014.
Minister of Rural Development; Minister of Panchayati Raj	Nitin Gadkari	4 June 2014	9 November 2014	BJP	Additional charge following demise of Gopinath Munde.
Minister of Rural Development; Minister of Panchayati Raj	Chaudhary Birender Singh	9 November 2014	5 July 2016	BJP	
Minister of Rural Development; Minister of Panchayati Raj	Narendra Singh Tomar	5 July 2016	30 May 2019	BJP	
Minister of Drinking Water and Sanitation	Gopinath Munde	27 May 2014	3 June 2014	BJP	Died in an accident on 3 June 2014.
Minister of Drinking Water and Sanitation	Nitin Gadkari	4 June 2014	9 November 2014	BJP	Additional charge following demise of Gopinath Munde.
Minister of Drinking Water and Sanitation	Chaudhary Birender Singh	9 November 2014	5 July 2016	BJP	
Minister of Drinking Water and Sanitation	Narendra Singh Tomar	5 July 2016	3 September 2017	BJP	
Minister of Drinking Water and Sanitation	Uma Bharati	3 September 2017	30 May 2019	BJP	
Ministry of Consumer Affairs, Food and Public Distribution	Ram Vilas Paswan	27 May 2014	30 May 2019	LJP	
Ministry of Consumer Affairs, Food and Public Distribution	Radha Mohan Singh (Acting)	22 May 2017	17 June 2017	BJP	Additional charge during period of indisposition of Ram Vilas Paswan.
Minister of Micro, Small and Medium Enterprises	Kalraj Mishra	27 May 2014	3 September 2017	BJP	
Minister of Micro, Small and Medium Enterprises	Giriraj Singh	3 September 2017	30 May 2019	BJP	MoS (I/C) was responsible.
Minister of Women and Child Development	Maneka Gandhi	27 May 2014	30 May 2019	BJP	
Minister of Chemicals and Fertilizers	Ananth Kumar	27 May 2014	12 November 2018	BJP	Died on 12 November 2018.
Minister of Chemicals and Fertilizers	D. V. Sadananda Gowda	13 November 2018	30 May 2019	BJP	Additional charge following demise of Ananth Kumar.
Minister of Communications and Information Technology	Ravi Shankar Prasad	27 May 2014	5 July 2016	BJP	Bifurcated into Ministry of Communications and Ministry of Electronics and Information Technology.
Minister of Electronics and Information Technology	Ravi Shankar Prasad	5 July 2016	30 May 2019	BJP	
Minister of Law and Justice	Ravi Shankar Prasad	27 May 2014	9 November 2014	BJP	
Minister of Law and Justice	D. V. Sadananda Gowda	9 November 2014	5 July 2016	BJP	
Minister of Law and Justice	Ravi Shankar Prasad	5 July 2016	30 May 2019	BJP	
Minister of Civil Aviation	Ashok Gajapathi Raju	27 May 2014	9 March 2018	TDP	Resigned.
Minister of Civil Aviation	Suresh Prabhu	10 March 2018	30 May 2019	BJP	Additional charge following resignation of Ashok Gajapathi Raju.
Minister of Heavy Industries and Public Enterprises	Anant Geete	27 May 2014	30 May 2019	SS	
Minister of Food Processing Industries	Harsimrat Kaur Badal	27 May 2014	30 May 2019	SAD	
Minister of Mines	Narendra Singh Tomar	27 May 2014	5 July 2016	BJP	
Minister of Mines	Piyush Goyal	5 July 2016	3 September 2017	BJP	MoS (I/C) was responsible.
Minister of Mines	Narendra Singh Tomar	3 September 2017	30 May 2019	BJP	
Minister of Steel	Narendra Singh Tomar	27 May 2014	5 July 2016	BJP	
Minister of Steel	Chaudhary Birender Singh	5 July 2016	30 May 2019	BJP	
Minister of Labour and Employment	Narendra Singh Tomar	27 May 2014	9 November 2014	BJP	
Minister of Labour and Employment	Bandaru Dattatreya	9 November 2014	3 September 2017	BJP	MoS (I/C) was responsible.
Minister of Labour and Employment	Santosh Kumar Gangwar	3 September 2017	30 May 2019	BJP	MoS (I/C) was responsible.
Minister of Tribal Affairs	Jual Oram	27 May 2014	30 May 2019	BJP	
Minister of Agriculture	Radha Mohan Singh	27 May 2014	27 August 2015	BJP	Renamed as Ministry of Agriculture and Farmers' Welfare.
Minister of Agriculture and Farmers' Welfare	Radha Mohan Singh	27 August 2015	30 May 2019	BJP	
Minister of Social Justice and Empowerment	Thawar Chand Gehlot	27 May 2014	30 May 2019	BJP	
Minister of Human Resource Development	Smriti Irani	27 May 2014	5 July 2016	BJP	
Minister of Human Resource Development	Prakash Javadekar	5 July 2016	30 May 2019	BJP	
Minister of Health and Family Welfare	Harsh Vardhan	27 May 2014	9 November 2014	BJP	
Minister of Health and Family Welfare	Jagat Prakash Nadda	9 November 2014	30 May 2019	BJP	
Minister of Statistics and Programme Implementation	Rao Inderjit Singh	27 May 2014	9 November 2014	BJP	MoS (I/C) was responsible.
Minister of Statistics and Programme Implementation	V. K. Singh	9 November 2014	5 July 2016	BJP	MoS (I/C) was responsible.
Minister of Statistics and Programme Implementation	D. V. Sadananda Gowda	5 July 2016	30 May 2019	BJP	
Minister of Textiles	Santosh Kumar Gangwar	27 May 2014	5 July 2016	BJP	MoS (I/C) was responsible.
Minister of Textiles	Smriti Irani	5 July 2016	30 May 2019	BJP	
Minister of Petroleum and Natural Gas	Dharmendra Pradhan	27 May 2014	3 September 2017	BJP	MoS (I/C) was responsible.
Minister of Petroleum and Natural Gas	Dharmendra Pradhan	3 September 2017	30 May 2019	BJP	
Minister of Information and Broadcasting	Prakash Javadekar	27 May 2014	9 November 2014	BJP	MoS (I/C) was responsible.
Minister of Information and Broadcasting	Arun Jaitley	9 November 2014	5 July 2016	BJP	
Minister of Information and Broadcasting	M. Venkaiah Naidu	5 July 2016	17 July 2017	BJP	Resigned.
Minister of Information and Broadcasting	Smriti Irani	18 July 2017	14 May 2018	BJP	Additional charge following resignation of M. Venkaiah Naidu.
Minister of Information and Broadcasting	Rajyavardhan Singh Rathore	14 May 2018	30 May 2019	BJP	MoS (I/C) was responsible.
Minister of Environment, Forest and Climate Change	Prakash Javadekar	27 May 2014	5 July 2016	BJP	MoS (I/C) was responsible.
Minister of Environment, Forest and Climate Change	Anil Madhav Dave	5 July 2016	18 May 2017	BJP	MoS (I/C) was responsible. Died on 18 May 2017.
Minister of Environment, Forest and Climate Change	Harsh Vardhan	18 May 2017	30 May 2019	BJP	Additional charge following demise of Anil Madhav Dave.
Minister of Coal	Piyush Goyal	27 May 2014	3 September 2017	BJP	MoS (I/C) was responsible.
Minister of Coal	Piyush Goyal	3 September 2017	30 May 2019	BJP	
Minister of Science and Technology; Minister of Earth Sciences	Jitendra Singh	27 May 2014	9 November 2014	BJP	MoS (I/C) was responsible.
Minister of Science and Technology; Minister of Earth Sciences	Harsh Vardhan	9 November 2014	30 May 2019	BJP	
Minister of Commerce and Industry	Nirmala Sitharaman	27 May 2014	3 September 2017	BJP	MoS (I/C) was responsible.
Minister of Commerce and Industry	Suresh Prabhu	3 September 2017	30 May 2019	BJP	
Minister of Skill Development and Entrepreneurship	Rajiv Pratap Rudy	9 November 2014	3 September 2017	BJP	MoS (I/C) was responsible.
Minister of Skill Development and Entrepreneurship	Dharmendra Pradhan	3 September 2017	30 May 2019	BJP	

=== Ministers of State (Independent Charge) ===
Portfolio	Minister	Took office	Left office	Party	Remarks
Minister of State (Independent Charge) of Development of North Eastern Region	V. K. Singh	27 May 2014	9 November 2014	BJP	
Minister of State (Independent Charge) of Development of North Eastern Region	Jitendra Singh	9 November 2014	30 May 2019	BJP	
Minister of State (Independent Charge) of Planning	Rao Inderjit Singh	27 May 2014	30 May 2019	BJP	
Minister of State (Independent Charge) of Culture	Shripad Yesso Naik	27 May 2014	9 November 2014	BJP	
Minister of State (Independent Charge) of Culture	Mahesh Sharma	9 November 2014	30 May 2019	BJP	
Minister of State (Independent Charge) of Tourism	Shripad Yesso Naik	27 May 2014	9 November 2014	BJP	
Minister of State (Independent Charge) of Tourism	Mahesh Sharma	9 November 2014	3 September 2017	BJP	
Minister of State (Independent Charge) of Tourism	Alphons Kannanthanam	3 September 2017	30 May 2019	BJP	
Minister of State (Independent Charge) of Skill Development, Entrepreneurship, Youth Affairs and Sports	Sarbananda Sonowal	27 May 2014	9 November 2014	BJP	Bifurcated into Ministry of Youth Affairs and Sports and Ministry of Skill Development and Entrepreneurship.
Minister of State (Independent Charge) of Youth Affairs and Sports	Sarbananda Sonowal	9 November 2014	22 May 2016	BJP	Resigned.
Minister of State (Independent Charge) of Youth Affairs and Sports	Jitendra Singh	22 May 2016	5 July 2016	BJP	Additional charge following resignation of Sarbananda Sonowal.
Minister of State (Independent Charge) of Youth Affairs and Sports	Vijay Goel	5 July 2016	3 September 2017	BJP	
Minister of State (Independent Charge) of Youth Affairs and Sports	Rajyavardhan Singh Rathore	3 September 2017	30 May 2019	BJP	
Minister of State (Independent Charge) of Power; Minister of State (Independent Charge) of New and Renewable Energy	Piyush Goyal	27 May 2014	3 September 2017	BJP	
Minister of State (Independent Charge) of Power; Minister of State (Independent Charge) of New and Renewable Energy	Raj Kumar Singh	3 September 2017	30 May 2019	BJP	
Minister of State (Independent Charge) of AYUSH	Shripad Yesso Naik	9 November 2014	30 May 2019	BJP	
Minister of State (Independent Charge) of Communications	Manoj Sinha	5 July 2016	30 May 2019	BJP	

=== Ministers of State ===
Portfolio	Minister	Took office	Left office	Party	Remarks
Minister of State in the Ministry of External Affairs	V. K. Singh	27 May 2014	30 May 2019	BJP	
Minister of State in the Ministry of External Affairs	M. J. Akbar	5 July 2016	17 October 2018	BJP	Resigned.
Minister of State in the Ministry of Overseas Indian Affairs	V. K. Singh	27 May 2014	7 January 2016	BJP	Merged with Ministry of External Affairs.
Minister of State in the Ministry of Defence	Rao Inderjit Singh	27 May 2014	5 July 2016	BJP	
Minister of State in the Ministry of Defence	Subhash Bhamre	5 July 2016	30 May 2019	BJP	
Minister of State in the Ministry of Parliamentary Affairs	Santosh Kumar Gangwar	27 May 2014	9 November 2014	BJP	
Minister of State in the Ministry of Parliamentary Affairs	Prakash Javadekar	27 May 2014	9 November 2014	BJP	
Minister of State in the Ministry of Parliamentary Affairs	Rajiv Pratap Rudy	9 November 2014	5 July 2016	BJP	
Minister of State in the Ministry of Parliamentary Affairs	Mukhtar Abbas Naqvi	9 November 2014	3 September 2017	BJP	
Minister of State in the Ministry of Parliamentary Affairs	S. S. Ahluwalia	5 July 2016	3 September 2017	BJP	
Minister of State in the Ministry of Parliamentary Affairs	Vijay Goel	3 September 2017	30 May 2019	BJP	
Minister of State in the Ministry of Parliamentary Affairs	Arjun Ram Meghwal	3 September 2017	30 May 2019	BJP	
Minister of State in the Ministry of Water Resources, River Development and Ganga Rejuvenation	Santosh Kumar Gangwar	27 May 2014	9 November 2014	BJP	
Minister of State in the Ministry of Water Resources, River Development and Ganga Rejuvenation	Sanwar Lal Jat	9 November 2014	5 July 2016	BJP	
Minister of State in the Ministry of Water Resources, River Development and Ganga Rejuvenation	Vijay Goel	5 July 2016	3 September 2017	BJP	
Minister of State in the Ministry of Water Resources, River Development and Ganga Rejuvenation	Sanjeev Balyan	5 July 2016	3 September 2017	BJP	
Minister of State in the Ministry of Water Resources, River Development and Ganga Rejuvenation	Arjun Ram Meghwal	3 September 2017	30 May 2019	BJP	
Minister of State in the Ministry of Water Resources, River Development and Ganga Rejuvenation	Satya Pal Singh	3 September 2017	30 May 2019	BJP	
Minister of State in the Prime Minister's Office; Minister of State in the Ministry of Personnel, Public Grievances and Pensions; Minister of State in the Department of Atomic Energy; Minister of State in the Department of Space	Jitendra Singh	27 May 2014	30 May 2019	BJP	
Minister of State in the Ministry of Finance	Nirmala Sitharaman	27 May 2014	9 November 2014	BJP	
Minister of State in the Ministry of Finance	Jayant Sinha	9 November 2014	5 July 2016	BJP	
Minister of State in the Ministry of Finance	Santosh Kumar Gangwar	5 July 2016	3 September 2017	BJP	
Minister of State in the Ministry of Finance	Arjun Ram Meghwal	5 July 2016	3 September 2017	BJP	
Minister of State in the Ministry of Finance	Pon Radhakrishnan	3 September 2017	30 May 2019	BJP	
Minister of State in the Ministry of Finance	Shiv Pratap Shukla	3 September 2017	30 May 2019	BJP	
Minister of State in the Ministry of Corporate Affairs	Nirmala Sitharaman	27 May 2014	9 November 2014	BJP	
Minister of State in the Ministry of Corporate Affairs	Arjun Ram Meghwal	5 July 2016	3 September 2017	BJP	
Minister of State in the Ministry of Corporate Affairs	P. P. Chaudhary	3 September 2017	30 May 2019	BJP	
Minister of State in the Ministry of Civil Aviation	G. M. Siddeshwara	27 May 2014	9 November 2014	BJP	
Minister of State in the Ministry of Civil Aviation	Mahesh Sharma	9 November 2014	5 July 2016	BJP	
Minister of State in the Ministry of Civil Aviation	Jayant Sinha	5 July 2016	30 May 2019	BJP	
Minister of State in the Ministry of Railways	Manoj Sinha	27 May 2014	30 May 2019	BJP	
Minister of State in the Ministry of Railways	Rajen Gohain	5 July 2016	30 May 2019	BJP	
Minister of State in the Ministry of Chemicals and Fertilizers	Nihalchand	27 May 2014	9 November 2014	BJP	
Minister of State in the Ministry of Chemicals and Fertilizers	Hansraj Ahir	9 November 2014	5 July 2016	BJP	
Minister of State in the Ministry of Chemicals and Fertilizers	Mansukh Mandaviya	5 July 2016	30 May 2019	BJP	
Minister of State in the Ministry of Chemicals and Fertilizers	Rao Inderjit Singh	3 September 2017	30 May 2019	BJP	
Minister of State in the Ministry of Rural Development	Upendra Kushwaha	27 May 2014	9 November 2014	RLSP	
Minister of State in the Ministry of Rural Development	Sudarshan Bhagat	9 November 2014	5 July 2016	BJP	
Minister of State in the Ministry of Rural Development	Ram Kripal Yadav	5 July 2016	30 May 2019	BJP	
Minister of State in the Ministry of Panchayati Raj	Upendra Kushwaha	27 May 2014	9 November 2014	RLSP	
Minister of State in the Ministry of Panchayati Raj	Nihalchand	9 November 2014	5 July 2016	BJP	
Minister of State in the Ministry of Panchayati Raj	Parshottam Rupala	5 July 2016	30 May 2019	BJP	
Minister of State in the Ministry of Drinking Water and Sanitation	Upendra Kushwaha	27 May 2014	9 November 2014	RLSP	
Minister of State in the Ministry of Drinking Water and Sanitation	Ram Kripal Yadav	9 November 2014	5 July 2016	BJP	
Minister of State in the Ministry of Drinking Water and Sanitation	Ramesh Jigajinagi	5 July 2016	30 May 2019	BJP	
Minister of State in the Ministry of Drinking Water and Sanitation	S. S. Ahluwalia	3 September 2017	14 May 2018	BJP	
Minister of State in the Ministry of Heavy Industries and Public Enterprises	Pon Radhakrishnan	27 May 2014	9 November 2014	BJP	
Minister of State in the Ministry of Heavy Industries and Public Enterprises	G. M. Siddeshwara	9 November 2014	12 July 2016	BJP	Resigned.
Minister of State in the Ministry of Heavy Industries and Public Enterprises	Babul Supriyo	12 July 2016	30 May 2019	BJP	
Minister of State in the Ministry of Home Affairs	Kiren Rijiju	27 May 2014	30 May 2019	BJP	
Minister of State in the Ministry of Home Affairs	Haribhai Parthibhai Chaudhary	9 November 2014	5 July 2016	BJP	
Minister of State in the Ministry of Home Affairs	Hansraj Ahir	5 July 2016	30 May 2019	BJP	
Minister of State in the Ministry of Road Transport and Highways	Krishan Pal Gurjar	27 May 2014	9 November 2014	BJP	
Minister of State in the Ministry of Road Transport and Highways	Pon Radhakrishnan	9 November 2014	3 September 2017	BJP	
Minister of State in the Ministry of Road Transport and Highways	Mansukh Mandaviya	5 July 2016	30 May 2019	BJP	
Minister of State in the Ministry of Shipping	Krishan Pal Gurjar	27 May 2014	9 November 2014	BJP	
Minister of State in the Ministry of Shipping	Pon Radhakrishnan	9 November 2014	30 May 2019	BJP	
Minister of State in the Ministry of Shipping	Mansukh Mandaviya	5 July 2016	30 May 2019	BJP	
Minister of State in the Ministry of Agriculture	Sanjeev Balyan	27 May 2014	27 August 2015	BJP	Renamed as Ministry of Agriculture and Farmers' Welfare.
Minister of State in the Ministry of Agriculture	Mohan Kundariya	9 November 2014	27 August 2015	BJP	Renamed as Ministry of Agriculture and Farmers' Welfare.
Minister of State in the Ministry of Agriculture and Farmers' Welfare	Sanjeev Balyan	27 August 2015	3 September 2017	BJP	
Minister of State in the Ministry of Agriculture and Farmers' Welfare	Mohan Kundariya	27 August 2015	5 July 2016	BJP	
Minister of State in the Ministry of Agriculture and Farmers' Welfare	S. S. Ahluwalia	5 July 2016	3 September 2017	BJP	
Minister of State in the Ministry of Agriculture and Farmers' Welfare	Parshottam Rupala	5 July 2016	30 May 2019	BJP	
Minister of State in the Ministry of Agriculture and Farmers' Welfare	Sudarshan Bhagat	5 July 2016	3 September 2017	BJP	
Minister of State in the Ministry of Agriculture and Farmers' Welfare	Krishna Raj	3 September 2017	30 May 2019	BJP	
Minister of State in the Ministry of Agriculture and Farmers' Welfare	Gajendra Singh Shekhawat	3 September 2017	30 May 2019	BJP	
Minister of State in the Ministry of Food Processing Industries	Sanjeev Balyan	27 May 2014	9 November 2014	BJP	
Minister of State in the Ministry of Food Processing Industries	Niranjan Jyoti	9 November 2014	30 May 2019	BJP	
Minister of State in the Ministry of Tribal Affairs	Mansukhbhai Vasava	27 May 2014	5 July 2016	BJP	
Minister of State in the Ministry of Tribal Affairs	Jasvantsinh Sumanbhai Bhabhor	5 July 2016	30 May 2019	BJP	
Minister of State in the Ministry of Tribal Affairs	Sudarshan Bhagat	3 September 2017	30 May 2019	BJP	
Minister of State in the Ministry of Consumer Affairs, Food and Public Distribution	Raosaheb Danve	27 May 2014	6 March 2015	BJP	Resigned.
Minister of State in the Ministry of Consumer Affairs, Food and Public Distribution	C. R. Chaudhary	5 July 2016	30 May 2019	BJP	
Minister of State in the Ministry of Mines	Vishnu Deo Sai	27 May 2014	5 July 2016	BJP	
Minister of State in the Ministry of Mines	Haribhai Parthibhai Chaudhary	3 September 2017	30 May 2019	BJP	
Minister of State in the Ministry of Steel	Vishnu Deo Sai	27 May 2014	30 May 2019	BJP	
Minister of State in the Ministry of Labour and Employment	Vishnu Deo Sai	27 May 2014	9 November 2014	BJP	
Minister of State in the Ministry of Social Justice and Empowerment	Sudarshan Bhagat	27 May 2014	9 November 2014	BJP	
Minister of State in the Ministry of Social Justice and Empowerment	Krishan Pal Gurjar	9 November 2014	30 May 2019	BJP	
Minister of State in the Ministry of Social Justice and Empowerment	Vijay Sampla	9 November 2014	30 May 2019	BJP	
Minister of State in the Ministry of Social Justice and Empowerment	Ramdas Athawale	5 July 2016	30 May 2019	RPI(A)	
Minister of State in the Ministry of Health and Family Welfare	Shripad Yesso Naik	9 November 2014	5 July 2016	BJP	
Minister of State in the Ministry of Health and Family Welfare	Faggan Singh Kulaste	5 July 2016	3 September 2017	BJP	
Minister of State in the Ministry of Health and Family Welfare	Anupriya Singh Patel	5 July 2016	30 May 2019	AD(S)	
Minister of State in the Ministry of Health and Family Welfare	Ashwini Kumar Choubey	3 September 2017	30 May 2019	BJP	
Minister of State in the Ministry of Minority Affairs	Mukhtar Abbas Naqvi	9 November 2014	12 July 2016	BJP	
Minister of State in the Ministry of Minority Affairs	Virendra Kumar Khatik	3 September 2017	30 May 2019	BJP	
Minister of State in the Ministry of Micro, Small and Medium Enterprises	Giriraj Singh	9 November 2014	3 September 2017	BJP	
Minister of State in the Ministry of Micro, Small and Medium Enterprises	Haribhai Parthibhai Chaudhary	5 July 2016	3 September 2017	BJP	
Minister of State in the Ministry of Human Resource Development	Upendra Kushwaha	9 November 2014	11 December 2018	RLSP	Resigned.
Minister of State in the Ministry of Human Resource Development	Ram Shankar Katheria	9 November 2014	5 July 2016	BJP	
Minister of State in the Ministry of Human Resource Development	Mahendra Nath Pandey	5 July 2016	3 September 2017	BJP	
Minister of State in the Ministry of Human Resource Development	Satya Pal Singh	3 September 2017	30 May 2019	BJP	
Minister of State in the Ministry of Science and Technology; Minister of State in the Ministry of Earth Sciences	Y. S. Chowdary	9 November 2014	9 March 2018	TDP	Resigned.
Minister of State in the Ministry of Information and Broadcasting	Rajyavardhan Singh Rathore	9 November 2014	14 May 2018	BJP	
Minister of State in the Ministry of Urban Development; Minister of State in the Ministry of Housing and Urban Poverty Alleviation	Babul Supriyo	9 November 2014	12 July 2016	BJP	
Minister of State in the Ministry of Urban Development; Minister of State in the Ministry of Housing and Urban Poverty Alleviation	Rao Inderjit Singh	5 July 2016	6 July 2017	BJP	The Ministry of Urban Development and Ministry of Housing and Urban Poverty Alleviation were merged to form the Ministry of Housing and Urban Affairs.
Minister of State in the Ministry of Housing and Urban Affairs	Rao Inderjit Singh	6 July 2017	3 September 2017	BJP	
Minister of State in the Ministry of Textiles	Ajay Tamta	5 July 2016	30 May 2019	BJP	
Minister of State in the Ministry of Women and Child Development	Krishna Raj	5 July 2016	3 September 2017	BJP	
Minister of State in the Ministry of Women and Child Development	Virendra Kumar Khatik	3 September 2017	30 May 2019	BJP	
Minister of State in the Ministry of Law and Justice	P. P. Chaudhary	5 July 2016	30 May 2019	BJP	
Minister of State in the Ministry of Electronics and Information Technology	P. P. Chaudhary	5 July 2016	3 September 2017	BJP	
Minister of State in the Ministry of Electronics and Information Technology	Alphons Kannanthanam	3 September 2017	14 May 2018	BJP	
Minister of State in the Ministry of Electronics and Information Technology	S. S. Ahluwalia	14 May 2018	30 May 2019	BJP	
Minister of State in the Ministry of Statistics and Programme Implementation	Vijay Goel	3 September 2017	30 May 2019	BJP	
Minister of State in the Ministry of Environment, Forest and Climate Change	Mahesh Sharma	3 September 2017	30 May 2019	BJP	
Minister of State in the Ministry of Coal	Haribhai Parthibhai Chaudhary	3 September 2017	30 May 2019	BJP	
Minister of State in the Ministry of Skill Development and Entrepreneurship	Anant Kumar Hegde	3 September 2017	30 May 2019	BJP	
Minister of State in the Ministry of Commerce and Industry	C. R. Chaudhary	3 September 2017	30 May 2019	BJP	

== Demographics ==
Representation of cabinet ministers by party
1. Bharatiya Janata Party (93.0%)
2. Lok Janshakti Party (1.41%)
3. Shiv Sena (1.41%)
4. Shiromani Akali Dal (1.41%)
5. Republican Party of India (Athawale) (1.41%)
6. Apna Dal (Soneylal) (1.41%)

=== Parties ===
Party	Cabinet Ministers	Ministers of State (I/C)	Ministers of State	Total number of ministers
BJP	23 (Note: Including Prime Minister)	11	32	66
LJP	1	0	0	1
SS	1	0	0	1
SAD	1	0	0	1
RPI (A)	0	0	1	1
AD (S)	0	0	1	1
Total	26	11	34	71

=== States ===
State	Cabinet Ministers	Ministers of State (I/C)	Ministers of State	Total number of ministers	Name of ministers
Andhra Pradesh	1	—	—	1	Suresh Prabhu
Arunachal Pradesh	—	—	1	1	Kiren Rijiju
Assam	—	—	1	1	Rajen Gohain
Bihar	3	2	2	7	Ram Vilas Paswan; Ravi Shankar Prasad; Radha Mohan Singh; Giriraj Singh; Raj Kumar Singh; Ram Kripal Yadav; Ashwini Kumar Choubey
Chhattisgarh	—	—	1	1	Vishnu Deo Sai
Goa	—	1	—	1	Shripad Yesso Naik
Gujarat	1	—	4	5	Smriti Irani; Haribhai Parthibhai Chaudhary; Parshottam Rupala; Jasvantsinh Sumanbhai Bhabhor; Mansukh Mandaviya
Haryana	1	1	1	3	Chaudhary Birender Singh; Rao Inderjit Singh; Krishan Pal Gurjar
Himachal Pradesh	1	—	—	1	Jagat Prakash Nadda
Jammu and Kashmir	—	1	—	1	Jitendra Singh
Jharkhand	1	—	2	3	Mukhtar Abbas Naqvi; Sudarshan Bhagat; Jayant Sinha
Karnataka	2	—	2	4	D. V. Sadananda Gowda; Nirmala Sitharaman; Ramesh Jigajinagi; Anant Kumar Hegde
Madhya Pradesh	4	—	1	5	Sushma Swaraj; Narendra Singh Tomar; Thawar Chand Gehlot; Dharmendra Pradhan; Virendra Kumar Khatik
Maharashtra	4	—	3	7	Nitin Gadkari; Anant Geete; Prakash Javadekar; Piyush Goyal; Ramdas Athawale; Hansraj Ahir; Subhash Bhamre
Odisha	1	—	—	1	Jual Oram
Punjab	1	—	1	2	Harsimrat Kaur Badal; Vijay Sampla
Rajasthan	—	2	5	7	Rajyavardhan Singh Rathore; Alphons Kannanthanam; Vijay Goel; Arjun Ram Meghwal; C. R. Chaudhary; P. P. Chaudhary; Gajendra Singh Shekhawat
Tamil Nadu	—	—	1	1	Pon Radhakrishnan
Uttar Pradesh	5	4	6	16	Narendra Modi (Prime Minister); Rajnath Singh; Arun Jaitley; Uma Bharati; Maneka Gandhi; Santosh Kumar Gangwar; Mahesh Sharma; Manoj Sinha; Hardeep Singh Puri; V. K. Singh; Shiv Pratap Shukla; Niranjan Jyoti; Krishna Raj; Anupriya Singh Patel; Satya Pal Singh
Uttarakhand	—	—	1	1	Ajay Tamta
West Bengal	—	—	2	2	S. S. Ahluwalia; Babul Supriyo
Delhi	1	—	—	1	Harsh Vardhan
Total	26	11	34	71	

== Demographics of former minister ==
=== Parties ===
Party	Cabinet Ministers	Ministers of State (I/C)	Ministers of State	Total number of ministers
BJP	6	4	11	21
TDP	1	0	1	2
RLSP	0	0	1	1
Total	7	4	13	24

=== States ===
State	Cabinet Ministers	Ministers of State (I/C)	Ministers of State	Total number of ministers	Name of ministers
Andhra Pradesh	1	—	1	2	Ashok Gajapathi Raju; Y. S. Chowdary
Assam	—	1	—	1	Sarbananda Sonowal
Bihar	—	1	1	2	Rajiv Pratap Rudy; Upendra Kushwaha
Gujarat	—	—	2	2	Mansukhbhai Vasava; Mohan Kundariya
Karnataka	1	—	1	2	Ananth Kumar; G. M. Siddeshwara
Madhya Pradesh	1	1	2	4	Najma Heptulla; Anil Madhav Dave; Faggan Singh Kulaste; M. J. Akbar
Maharashtra	1	—	1	2	Gopinath Munde; Raosaheb Danve
Rajasthan	1	—	2	3	M. Venkaiah Naidu; Nihalchand; Sanwar Lal Jat
Telangana	—	1	—	1	Bandaru Dattatreya
Uttar Pradesh	2	—	3	5	Kalraj Mishra; Manohar Parrikar; Sanjeev Balyan; Ram Shankar Katheria; Mahendra Nath Pandey
Total	7	4	13	24	

== See also ==
- National Democratic Alliance
- 2014 Indian cabinet reshuffle
- List of members of the 16th Lok Sabha
- Union Council of Ministers
- Premiership of Narendra Modi
