= MOIA =

MOIA may refer to:

- Ministry of Overseas Indian Affairs
- Shared ride service of Volkswagen Group
