= Krishna Nagar Assembly constituency =

Constituency of the Delhi legislative assembly in India

Coordinates: 28.653°N 77.285°E

Krishna Nagar
- Constituency No. 60 for the Delhi Legislative Assembly

Constituency details
- Country: India
- Region: North India
- State: Delhi
- District: East Delhi
- Reservation: None

Member of Legislative Assembly
- 8th Delhi Legislative Assembly
- Incumbent Anil Goyal
- Party: Bharatiya Janata Party
- Elected year: 2025

Krishna Nagar Assembly constituency is one of the 70 legislative assembly constituencies of Delhi in northern India. Krishna Nagar assembly constituency is a part of East Delhi Lok Sabha constituency. Bharatiya Janata Party's Anil Goyal defeated Aam Aadmi Party's candidate Vikas Bagga by 19,494 votes in the 2025 assembly election.

== Members of the Legislative Assembly ==
Year	Member	Party
1993	Harsh Vardhan	Bharatiya Janata Party
1998	Harsh Vardhan	Bharatiya Janata Party
2003	Harsh Vardhan	Bharatiya Janata Party
2008	Harsh Vardhan	Bharatiya Janata Party
2013	Harsh Vardhan	Bharatiya Janata Party
2015	S.K. Bagga	Aam Aadmi Party
2020	S.K. Bagga	Aam Aadmi Party
2025	Anil Goyal	Bharatiya Janata Party

== Election results ==
=== 2025 ===
Delhi Assembly elections, 2025: Krishna Nagar
Party	Candidate	Votes	%	±%
BJP	Anil Goyal	75,922	52.94	
AAP	Vikas Bagga	56,424	39.34	
INC	Gurcharan Singh Raju	9,393	6.54	
NOTA	None of the Above	696		
Majority		19,498		
Turnout		1,43,405		
BJP gain from AAP		Swing		

=== 2020 ===
Delhi Assembly elections, 2020: Krishna Nagar
Party	Candidate	Votes	%	±%
AAP	S. K. Bagga	72,111	49.10	+1.11
BJP	Dr. Anil Goyal	68,116	46.38	+0.05
INC	Dr. Ashok Kumar Walia	5,079	3.46	−1.05
BSP	Advocate Manjeet Singh	362	0.25	−0.11
NOTA	None of the Above	532	0.36	+0.10
Majority		3,995	2.72	+1.06
Turnout		1,46,981	67.60	−4.67
AAP hold		Swing	+1.06	

=== 2015 ===
Delhi Assembly elections, 2015: Krishna Nagar
Party	Candidate	Votes	%	±%
AAP	S. K. Bagga	65,919	47.99	+33.24
BJP	Kiran Bedi	63,642	46.33	−12.25
INC	Bansi Lal	6,189	4.51	−17.46
BSP	Yogesh Kumar	501	0.36	−1.17
CPI	Chandan Lal Premi	339	0.25	
NOTA	None of the Above	358	0.26	−0.23
Majority		2,277	1.66	−34.70
Turnout		1,37,415	72.27	+4.52
AAP gain from BJP		Swing	+22.62	

=== 2013 ===
Delhi Assembly elections, 2013: Krishna Nagar
Party	Candidate	Votes	%	±%
BJP	Dr. Harsh Vardhan	69,222	58.33	+12.83
INC	Dr. Vinod Kumar Monga	26,072	21.97	−20.48
AAP	Ishrat Ali Ansari	17,498	14.75	
Independent	Sahrur	2,876	2.42	
BSP	Nayeem Abbas	1,820	1.53	−8.00
SP	Salma	275	0.23	
ANC	Rajesh	165	0.14	
Independent	Vijay Kumar Arora	86	0.07	
Independent	Ajay Suryavanshi	63	0.05	
NOTA	None of the Above	587	0.49	
Majority		43,150	36.36	+33.31
Turnout		1,18,714	67.78	
BJP hold		Swing	+12.83	

=== 2008 ===
Delhi Assembly elections, 2008: Krishna Nagar
Party	Candidate	Votes	%	±%
BJP	Harsh Vardhan	47,852	45.50	−14.01
INC	Deepika Khullar	44,648	42.45	−6.55
BSP	Kamruddin	10,018	9.53	
CPI	Chandan Lal Premi	703	0.67	
BJSH	Radha Yadav Advocate	359	0.34	
Independent	Monika Mahajan	337	0.32	
Independent	Sanjay Kumar Gupta	294	0.28	
Independent	Suraj Prakash	215	0.20	
RWS	Ved Prakash Gupta	121	0.12	
Independent	Balwant Singh Parwana	103	0.10	
Independent	Prafulla Chander Mohan	101	0.10	
Independent	Mahender Kumar Jain	89	0.08	
Independent	Prithvi Pal Singh	81	0.08	
RSSHP	Shiv Prakash Tiwari	80	0.08	
Independent	Kunjesh Passi	52	0.05	
Independent	Irshad	48	0.05	
Independent	Govind Sahni	40	0.04	
Independent	Mohd Islam	34	0.03	
Majority		3,204	3.05	−20.56
Turnout		105,175	61.6	−0.16
BJP hold		Swing	-14.01	

=== 2003 ===
Delhi Assembly elections, 2003: Krishna Nagar
Party	Candidate	Votes	%	±%
BJP	Harsh Vardhan	35,477	59.51	+4.69
INC	Narinder Kumar	21,404	35.90	−6.99
Independent	Praveen	868	1.46	
Independent	Hukam Chand	712	1.19	
ABDUP	Raj Bala	292	0.49	
Independent	Ashok Parcha	261	0.44	
JKNPP	Saleem Khan	208	0.35	
JPJD	Balwant Singh Parwana	183	0.31	
Independent	Tilak Raj	109	0.18	
Independent	Brij Lal	100	0.17	
Majority		14,073	23.61	−11.68
Turnout		59,614	61.76	+9.57
BJP hold		Swing	+4.69	

=== 1998 ===
Delhi Assembly elections, 1998: Krishna Nagar
Party	Candidate	Votes	%	±%
BJP	Harsh Vardhan	30,358	54.82	+0.88
INC	S N Misra	23,748	42.89	+10.89
BSP	Virendra Kushwaha	567	1.02	
SS	Pramod Kumar	458	0.83	
JD	Krishna	140	0.25	−7.24
ABHM	Mohan Lal	103	0.19	
Majority		6,610	11.93	−10.01
Turnout		55,374	52.19	−18.68
BJP hold		Swing	+0.88	

=== 1993 ===
Delhi Assembly elections, 1993: Krishna Nagar
Party	Candidate	Votes	%	±%
BJP	Harsh Vardhan	30,537	53.94	
INC	Balvinder Singh	18,118	32.00	
JD	Virender Gaur	4,239	7.49	
IC(S)	Jai Prakash Sharma	2,133	3.77	
Independent	Mahinder Bahal	383	0.68	
CPI	Jagdish Chander Mongia	356	0.63	
Independent	Jay Prakash Sharma (Bhapa)	188	0.33	
BKD(J)	Natho Devi	106	0.19	
Independent	Narinder Tuli	75	0.13	
LPI	Ram Kishan Goyal	75	0.13	
Independent	Naveen Kumar Goyal	73	0.13	
Independent	Vinay Seth (Binny)	69	0.12	
Independent	Balwant Singh Parwana Kashyap	41	0.07	
HSD	Anil Kumar Sharma Gandhi	39	0.07	
Doordarshi Party	Vinod Kumar Gupta	35	0.06	
Independent	Ved Prakash Gaur	33	0.06	
Independent	Ramesh Maini	28	0.05	
Independent	Nem Singh Premi	24	0.04	
Independent	Murari Lal Rustagi	20	0.04	
Independent	Ramesh Kumar	14	0.02	
Independent	Parveen Gupta	11	0.02	
Independent	Raj Kumar Jain	10	0.02	
Independent	Pramod Kumar Bhandari	4	0.01	
Majority		12,419	21.94	
Turnout		56,611	70.87	
BJP win (new seat)				
