= Pravasi Bharatiya Divas =

Indian day of celebration, 9 January

Pravasi Bharatiya Divas (Non-Resident Indian Day)
- Official name: प्रवासी भारतीय दिवस
- Observed by: Ministry of External Affairs, Government of India
- Significance: To remember the favors and contributions made by Non Resident Indians to the welfare and development of the nation.
- Date: 08–10 January 2025
- Duration: 3 days
- Frequency: Yearly till 2015; Biennial since then
- First time: 2003
- Related to: Indian Arrival Day; South Asian Heritage Month

Pravasi Bharatiya Divas (transl. Non-Resident Indian (NRI) Day or Overseas Indian Day)) is a celebratory day observed (starting in 2003) on 9 January by the Republic of India to mark the contribution of the Overseas Indian community towards the development of India. The day commemorates the return of Mahatma Gandhi from South Africa to Bombay on 9 January 1915.

Established in 2000, it is sponsored by the Ministry of External Affairs of the Government of India and the Federation of Indian Chambers of Commerce and Industry (FICCI), the Confederation of Indian Industries and the Ministry of Development of North Eastern Region. This celebratory event is held from the 8th to the 10th of January every other year in a selected city in India: a forum for issues concerning the Indian Diaspora is organised, and the Pravasi Bharatiya Samman awards are given.

In 2006, the concept of Overseas Citizen of India (OCI) was launched during the Pravasi Bharatiya Divas convention at Hyderabad on 9 January.

In 2014, Pravasi Bhartiya Divas was held in New Delhi and was attended by 1,500 delegates from 51 countries. President Pranab Mukherjee gave the Pravasi Bharatiya Samman Awards.

In 2013, 11th Pravasi Bharatiya Divas was held in Kochi from 7–9 January, where the Indo-Canada Chamber of Commerce (ICCC) is organising partner of the summit. The President of Mauritius, Rajkeswur Purryag, was the chief guest at the official inaugural session. Canadian Minister Jason Kenney became the first individual of non-Indian heritage to address the gathering.

The 12th Pravasi Bharatiya Divas was held during 7–9 January 2014 at Vigyan Bhawan, New Delhi. The Theme for this year was Engaging Diaspora: Connecting Across Generations.

The 13th Pravasi Bharatiya Divas was held during 7–9 January 2015 at Mahatma Mandir, Gandhinagar, Gujarat. The theme for this year was "Apna Bharat, Apna Gaurav".

The 14th Pravasi Bharatiya Divas, which was supposed to be held during 7–9 January 2016 at New Delhi, was cancelled under the MEA's decision to make the event biennial.

The 14th Pravasi Bharatiya Divas was held during 7–9 January 2017 at Bengaluru, Karnataka. The theme for this year was "Redefining engagement with the Indian diaspora".

The 10th Regional Pravasi Bharatiya Divas was held during 6–7 January 2018 at Marina Bay Sands, Singapore.

The 15th Pravasi Bharatiya Divas was held during 21–23 January 2019 at Varanasi, India. The Prime Minister of Mauritius, Pravind Jugnauth, was the guest of honour.

The 17th Pravasi Bharatiya Diwas was held in Indore from 8-10 January 2023.

The 18th Pravasi Bharatiya Diwas was held in Bhubaneswar from 8-10 January 2025 .

== History ==
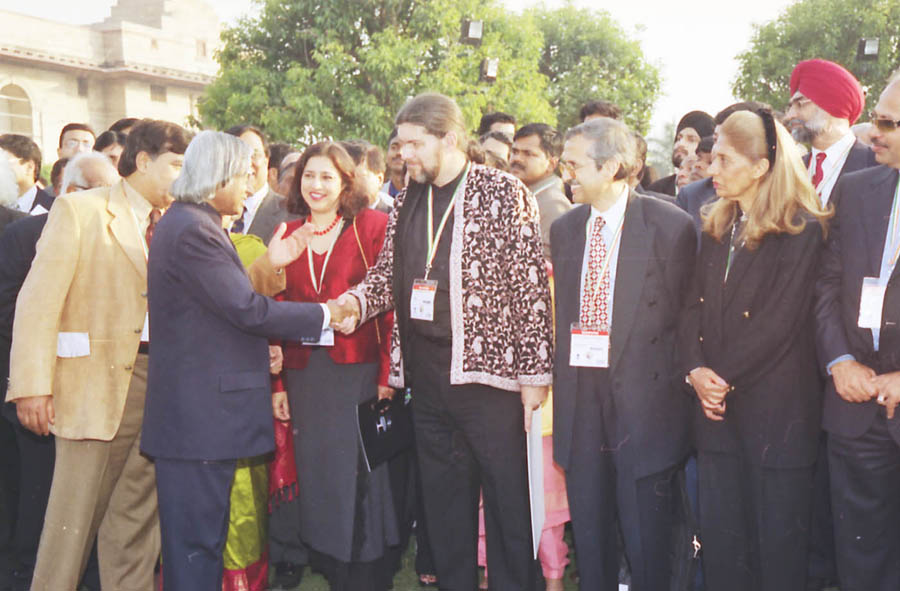
The President Shri A.P.J.Abdul Kalam meeting the Diaspora during the tea hosted by him on the occasion of ongoing 2nd Pravasi Bharatiya Divas in New Delhi on 11 January 2004

The decision to celebrate Pravasi Bharatiya Divas was taken in accordance with recommendations of the High Level Committee (HLC) on the Indian Diaspora set up by government of India under the chairmanship of L. M. Singhvi. The then Prime Minister of India, Shri Atal Bihari Vajpayee, received the report of the Committee at a public function at Vigyan Bhavan in New Delhi on 8 January 2002, and announced the "Pravasi Bharatiya Divas" (PBD) on 9 January 2002. The day was chosen to mark the return of Mahatma Gandhi from South Africa to India in 1915.

The occasion is marked by special programs to recognise the contributions of NRI/PIO individuals of exceptional merit, felicitate NRI/PIO individuals who have made exceptional contributions in their chosen field/profession (Pravasi Bharatiya Samman (Hindi: NRI/PIO Award)) and provide a forum to discuss issues and concerns of people of the diaspora. The event has been organised every year since 2003, and is sponsored by the Ministry of Overseas Indian Affairs and the CII (Confederation of Indian Industry), initially sponsored by FICCI.

The 8th Pravasi Bharatiya Divas took place on 7–9 January 2010 and was webcast live at the official Ministry of Overseas Indian Affairs website, also covered live on social media via live blogging and live tweeting at Pravasi Bharatiya Divas, an online platform powered by Kotak Mahindra Bank. An investment facilitation platform for overseas Indians, the Overseas Indians Facilitation Centre, was launched by India's Prime Minister, Manmohan Singh, with a view of strengthening ties with the diaspora for partnering in India's growth story on the occasion.

The 2012 Pravasi Bhartiya Divas was held from 7–9 January 2012. The venue was Jaipur, Rajasthan. Chief Guest of this event was the Prime Minister of Trinidad and Tobago, Ms Kamla Persad-Bissessar.

The 2013 Pravasi Bhartiya Divas was held from 8–9 January 2013 in Kochi, Kerala. Chief Guest of this event was the President of Mauritius, Rajkeshwar Purryag. The 2015 Pravasi Bharatiya Divas was held in Ahmedabad celebrating 100 years of Mahatma's return to India. Chief guest was Mr Donald Ramtar, President of Republic of Guyana. The theme for this was "Apna Bharat Apna Gaurav" "Connecting Generations".

Pravasi Bharatiya Divas (PBD), the annual event for the Indian diaspora, was canceled for 2016. The format of the event, which is held between 7 and 9 January, has been changed as announced by the minister of external affairs and overseas Indian affairs Sushma Swaraj, in October 2015. As per the announcement, the event was being moved to different states every two years; a smaller event would be held in Delhi every alternate year.

In 2017, the Pravasi Bharatiya Divas was held from 7–9 January 2017 in Bengaluru. The theme of this edition was "Redefining Engagement with the Indian Diaspora". The Ministry of External Affairs, under the guidance of Prime Minister Narendra Modi, had used digital modes to reach out to Indians abroad. The campaign Digital India also played a major role in bringing the success to Pravasi Bhartiya Divas. The plenary session 'Leveraging Social Media for Diaspora Connect' held on 9 January 2017, at the Pravasi Bharatiya Divas looked at social media as a medium in connecting the Indian Diaspora.

== Venues ==
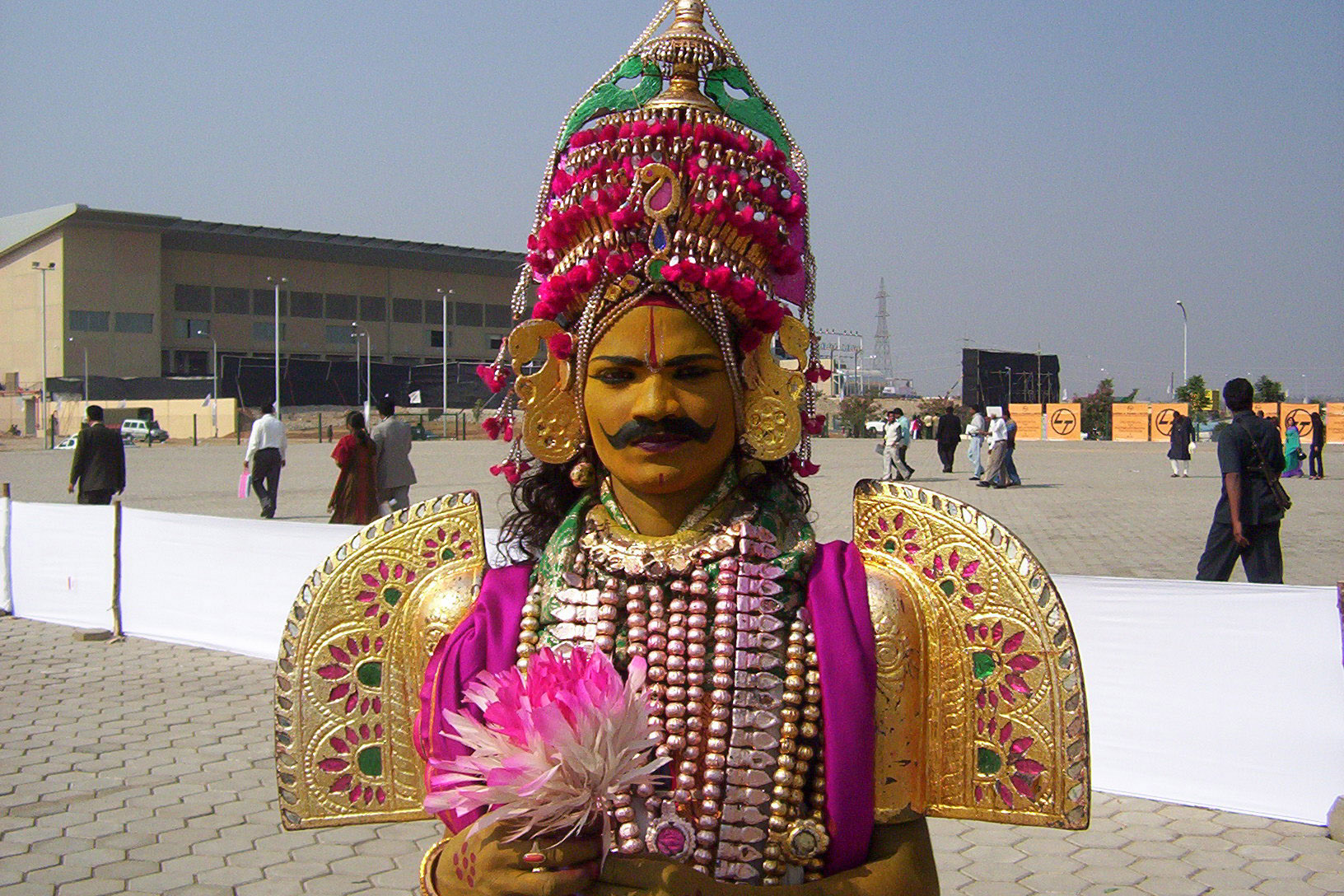
A folk artist at the Pravasi Bharatiya Divas in Hyderabad in 2006.

The Pravasi Bharatiya Divas Program since 2003 has been organised in the following cities:

Day	Year	Venue	State
1st	2003	New Delhi	Delhi
2nd	2004	New Delhi	Delhi
3rd	2005	Mumbai	Maharashtra
4th	2006	Hyderabad	Telangana
5th	2007	New Delhi	Delhi
6th	2008	New Delhi	Delhi
7th	2009	Chennai	Tamil Nadu
8th	2010	New Delhi	Delhi
9th	2011	New Delhi	Delhi
10th	2012	Jaipur	Rajasthan
11th	2013	Kochi	Kerala
12th	2014	New Delhi	Delhi
13th	2015	Gandhinagar	Gujarat
14th	2017	Bengaluru	Karnataka
15th	2019	Varanasi	Uttar Pradesh
16th	2021	Virtual	Delhi
17th	2023	Indore	Madhya Pradesh
18th	2025	Bhubaneswar	Odisha
19th	2027	Kolkata	West Bengal

== Chief Guests ==
Ever since the first Pravasi Bharatiya Divas of 2003, eminent Indian origin foreign heads of state, government and other personalities are invited as chief guests. The first chief guest was Sir Anerood Jugnauth, then Prime Minister of Mauritius.

No.	Year	Country	Name and designation
1	2003	Mauritius	Sir Anerood Jugnauth, Prime Minister of Mauritius
2	2004	Guyana	Bharrat Jagdeo, President of Guyana
3	2005	Suriname	Jules Ajodhia, Vice President of Suriname
4	2006	South Africa	Ahmed Kathrada, political activist
5	2007	Singapore	S. Jayakumar, Deputy Prime Minister of Singapore
6	2008	Mauritius	Navin Ramgoolam, Prime Minister of Mauritius
7	2009	Suriname	Ram Sardjoe, Vice President of Suriname
8	2010	United Kingdom	Khalid Hameed, Chairman of Alpha Hospital Group
9	2011	New Zealand	Sir Anand Satyanand, Governor-General of New Zealand
10	2012	Trinidad and Tobago	Kamla Persad-Bissessar, Prime Minister of Trinidad and Tobago
11	2013	Mauritius	Rajkeswur 'Kailash' Purryag, President of Mauritius
12	2014	Malaysia	G. Palanivel, Minister of Natural Resources and Environment of Malaysia
13	2015	Guyana	Donald Rabinderanauth Ramotar, President of Guyana
Event cancelled in 2016
14	2017	Portugal	António Costa, Prime Minister of Portugal
15	2019	Mauritius	Pravind Jugnauth, Prime Minister of Mauritius
16	2021	Suriname	Chandrikapersad Santokhi, President of Suriname
17	2023	Guyana	Irfaan Ali, President of Guyana
18	2025	Trinidad and Tobago	Christine Carla Kangaloo, President of Trinidad and Tobago

== Regional Pravasi Bharatiya Divas ==
The Ministry of External Affairs organizes Regional Pravasi Bharatiya Divas (RPBD) periodically outside India to connect with the Indian Diaspora in specific regions, familiarize them with the policies and programmes of the Government, enable them to contribute to India's development and growth, and address their concerns.

10 RPBD events have been held till date, at the following places:

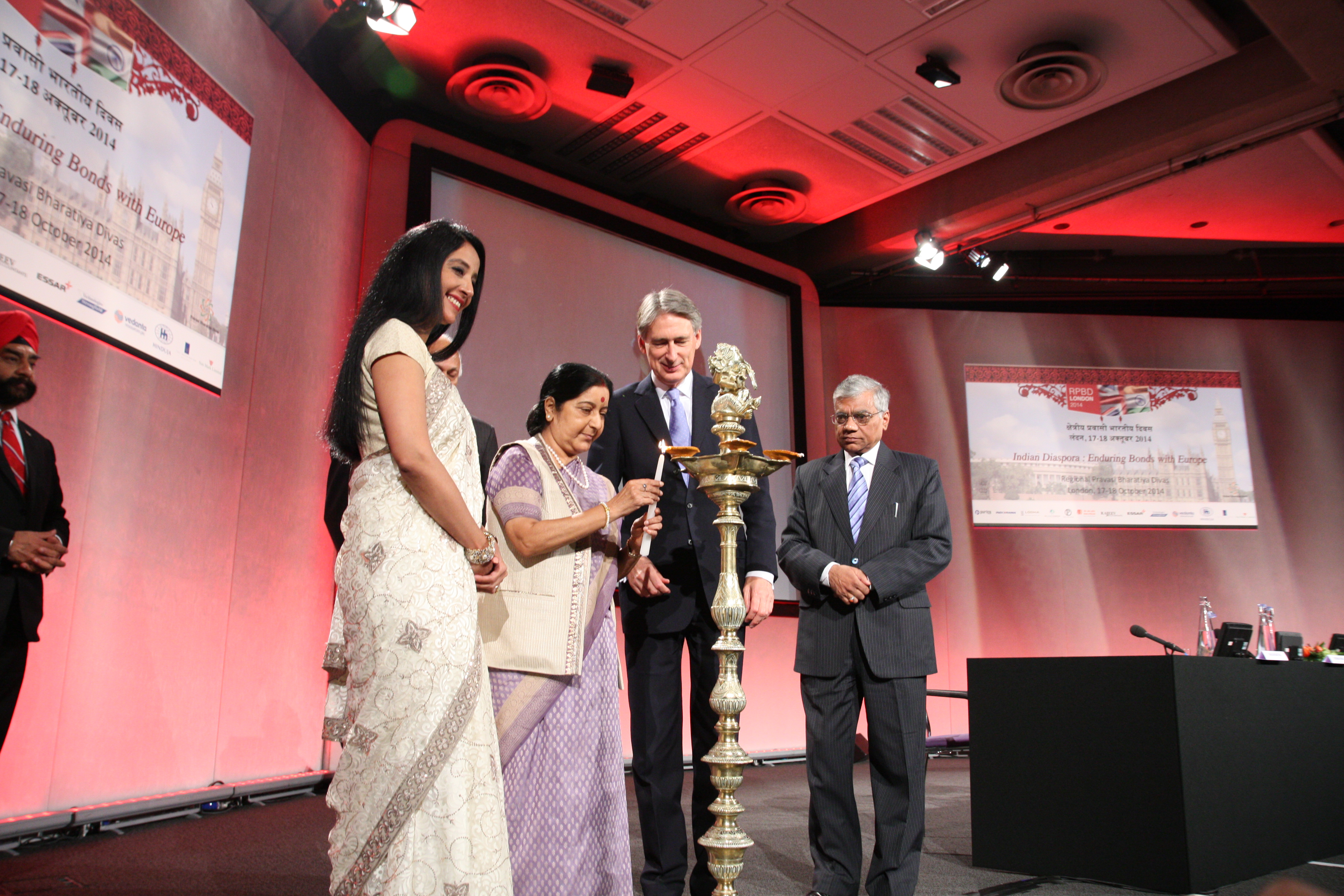
2014 Regional Pravasi Bharatiya Divas Convention in London

Rank	City	Country	Date
1st	New York City	United States	24 September 2007
2nd	Singapore	Singapore	10–11 October 2008
3rd	The Hague	Netherlands	19 September 2009
4th	Durban	South Africa	1–2 October 2010
5th	Toronto	Canada	8–10 June 2011
6th	Port Louis	Mauritius	27–28 October 2012
7th	Sydney	Australia	10–12 November 2013
8th	London	United Kingdom	16–18 October 2014
9th	Los Angeles	United States	14–15 November 2015
10th	Singapore	Singapore	6–7 January 2018

The 10th Regional Pravasi Bharatiya Divas (RPBD) Convention was organized in Singapore at Marina Bay Sands, on 6 & 7 January 2018. This was a special RPBD to celebrate the 25 years of strategic partnership between India and ASEAN. The theme of the 2018 PBD Convention is "Ancient Route, New Journey: Diaspora in the Dynamic India-ASEAN Partnership". Indian EAM Sushma Swaraj is the Guest of Honour, and Singapore's Deputy Prime Minister Teo Chee Hean also attended. Indian Road Transport and Highways Minister Nitin Gadkari and chief ministers of Andhra Pradesh and Assam, N Chandrababu Naidu and Sarbananda Sonowal respectively, also attended the event. Singapore's Trade and Industry Minister S Iswaran and Foreign Minister Vivian Balakrishnan also addressed over 2,500 delegates.

== Sushma Swaraj Bhawan (Previously known as Pravasi Bharatiya Kendra) ==
A High-Level Committee on Indian Diaspora, headed by Shri L. M. Singhvi, had recommended in January 2002 that the Government must renew and strengthen linkages of overseas Indians to their place of origin and with each other. The committee recommended that a Pravasi Bharatiya Bhavan should be set up to emerge as the focal point for networking between India and its overseas Indian community; and as a suitable place which would commemorate the trials, tribulations, the evolution, and achievements of the Indian Diaspora.

Taking this recommendation forward in January 2004, at the second Pravasi Bhartiya Divas (PBD) organized in Delhi, then Prime Minister Shri Atal Bihari Vajpayee announced that the Government will set up the Pravasi Bhartiya Kendra in New Delhi.

The Foundation Stone of the Kendra was laid by the then P.M. Dr. Manmohan Singh at 9th PBD in January 2011. Ground Breaking was done by then Minister of Overseas Indian Affairs on 28.04.2011 and construction started in April 2013.

Contract for construction of Pravasi Bharatiya Kendra (PBK) was awarded to National Building Construction Corporation (NBCC) on turnkey basis.

Prime Minister Narendra Modi inaugurated Pravasi Bharatiya Kendra in New Delhi on Sunday on the occasion of Gandhi Jayanti. The centre was dedicated to the welfare of the Indian Diaspora.

At the inauguration, the prime minister said "We are inaugurating this Kendra on a significant day of 2nd October. Gandhi Ji had left India but the call of the nation brought him back." Pravasi Bharatiya Kendra located at the heart of the Capital in Plots No.15A, 15B and 15D, Dr. Rizal Marg, Chanakyapuri, New Delhi is a tribute to the overseas Indian community; and commemorates their migration to various parts of the world, the challenges they faced abroad, their achievements and contributions.

Over time, the Kendra is expected to develop into a hub of activities for sustainable, symbiotic and mutually rewarding economic, social and cultural engagement between India and its Diaspora. Activities, seminars, events, workshops pertaining to the Indian Diaspora are expected to be organized here.

- The Museum in the Kendra will depict the history of migration of the overseas
- Indian community; their experiences and contributions.
- In the Kendra's state-of-the art auditorium, multi-purpose halls, Conference and seminar halls – workshops and conferences with overseas Indians and on issues pertaining to them would be organized on a regular basis. The Kendra will also house the autonomous bodies India Centre for Migration, a think-tank working on issues pertaining to Indian migrant workers and the India Development Foundation for Overseas Indians, a not-for-profit Trust promoting contributions to flagship programmes in India.
- The Library in PBK is a valuable repository of material about the Indian Diaspora including books written by overseas Indians in different languages. With an emphasis on digital material, —the library will provide access to online journals and prestigious library resources.
- Pravasi Bharatiya Kendra renamed Sushma Swaraj Bhawan as tribute to the late leader.

== Logo ==
In the year of 2016 when the event was decided to be held biannually the Ministry of External Affairs needed a new logo for Pravasi Bharatiya Divas Convention. It was crowdsourced through the MyGov portal in an open competition and the winner Debasish Sarkar was awarded in a Joint Press Conference of Ministry of External Affair and Karnataka Government and the new logo was inducted in the 14th Pravasi Bharatiya Divas. The philosophy behind the logo according to the creator was "the human chain depicts our brotherhood and strength across the world, 'Ashoka Chakra' along with the tricolour canopy showing the Worldwide contribution towards development on mankind and peaceful presence of 'Bharatiya' and 'Pravasi Bharatiya' all around the world".

== See also ==
- Overseas Indian Facilitation Centre
- Pravasi Bharatiya Samman
- Non-resident Indian (NRI)
- Person of Indian Origin (PIO)
- World Hindi Secretariat
- Indian Arrival Day
- Girmityas
