= Anil Madhav Dave =

Indian environmentalist and politician

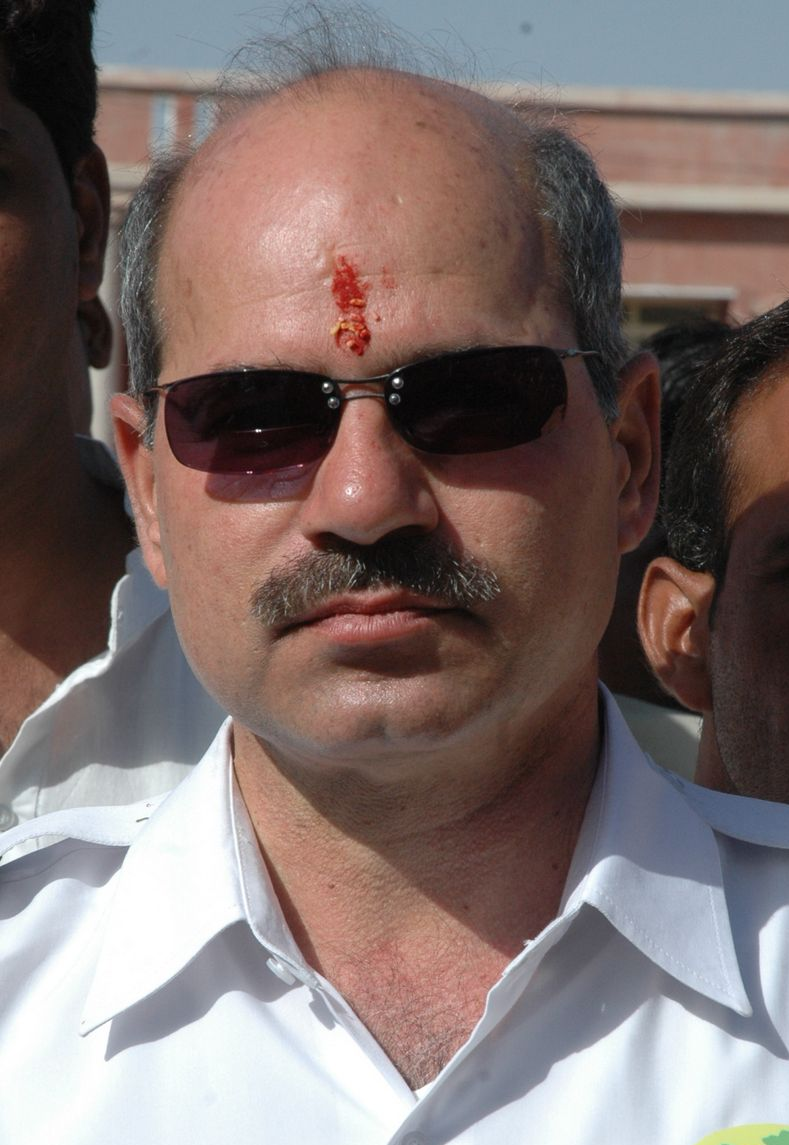

Minister of State Environment, Forest and Climate Change
- In office 5 July 2016 – 18 May 2017
- Prime Minister: Narendra Modi
- Preceded by: Prakash Javadekar
- Succeeded by: Harsh Vardhan

Member of Parliament, Rajya Sabha
- In office August 2009 – 18 May 2017
- Constituency: Madhya Pradesh

Personal details
- Born: 6 July 1956 Badnagar, Madhya Pradesh, India
- Died: 18 May 2017 (aged 60) New Delhi, India
- Party: Bharatiya Janata Party
- Education: Gujarati College, Indore
- Profession: Environmentalist, politician

Anil Madhav Dave (6 July 1956 – 18 May 2017) was an Indian environmentalist and politician. A member of the Bharatiya Janata Party, he served as the Minister of State for Environment, Forest and Climate Change in the Narendra Modi ministry from July 2016 till the time of his death in May 2017.

== Career ==
=== As environmentalist ===
Passionate about the revival of the Narmada River, Dave founded Narmada Samagra, an organization to work towards it. In a 2015 interview, he claimed human activity to be responsible for floods of the Narmada, the water of which is stored in the trees and mountains of its bank that seeps into it forming the actual catchment area. He held the release of chemicals into the catchment area responsible for aiding climate change in the region, and added that, "Climate change, in near future, will reduce Narmada into a cricket pitch as the river will die due to irresponsible human activities." He opposed big river projects and felt that those older than 20 years must go through social and economic audit to evaluate what was gained and lost from them. He advocated for natural farming against use of genetically modified seeds.

=== Political career ===
Dave was a Member of Parliament, representing Madhya Pradesh in the Rajya Sabha (the upper house of Indian Parliament) since 2009.

He was a member of various committees including the Committee on Water Resources and the Consultative Committee for the Ministry of Information and Broadcasting. He was also a member of the Parliamentary Forum on Global Warming and Climate Change from March 2010 to June 2010.

He was appointed the Minister of State (MoS) independent charge of Environment, Forest and Climate Change in the Modi Government's cabinet expansion on 5 July 2016.

On 15 August 2016, in the strongest statement of India's move towards an Asbestos-free country, Dave categorically stated "Since the use of asbestos is affecting human health, its usage should gradually be minimised and ended. As far as I know, its use is declining, but it must end".

== Personal life ==
Dave was born on 6 July 1956 in the city of Badnagar, in the Ujjain district of Madhya Pradesh, to Pushpa Devi and Madhav Dave. He earned his master's degree in commerce from Gujarati College, Indore, specializing in Rural Development and Management. He also began his political career during this time, taking part in the JP Movement, and was elected the college president. He was also a cadet of the National Cadet Corps' Air Wing.

Dave joined the Rashtriya Swayamsevak Sangh and identified himself as its "swayamsewak" (volunteer).

=== Death ===
Dave complained of uneasiness on the morning of 18 May 2017 at his residence in Safdarjung Road, New Delhi. He was brought to the All India Institute of Medical Sciences at 8:45 a.m. (IST) in a state of cardiac arrest. Efforts to revive him failed and was pronounced dead at 9:45 a.m. (IST). He had been diagnosed with pneumonia early in 2017 and had not completely recovered. He was unmarried. In a will written in July 2012, he had expressed a wish that his funeral be performed in accordance to Vedic rituals and "if possible, cremation ... be performed on the banks of river Narmada at Bandrabhan where Nadi Mahotsav was organised". He had added, "If you want to cherish my memories, plant trees and save them. This would give me pleasure." In accordance with his wishes, the funeral was carried out in Bandrabhan, on the banks of the River Narmada, in Madhya Pradesh's Narmadapuram district at 10 a.m. (IST) on 19 May with full state honours. Dave was the second minister in Modi cabinet to die, the first being Gopinath Munde, former minister for rural development, who died in a car accident a week after his swearing-in ceremony.

== Publications ==
- From Amarkantak to Amarkantak
- Beyond Copenhagen

Political offices
Preceded by Prakash Javadekar	Minister of Environment, Forest and Climate Change; 5 July 2016 – 18 May 2017; Minister of State with Independent charge	Succeeded by Harsh Vardhan
