= Anil Goyal =

Indian politician

Member of Delhi Legislative Assembly
- Incumbent
- Assumed office 8 February 2025
- Preceded by: S.K. Bagga
- Constituency: Krishna Nagar

Personal details
- Political party: Bharatiya Janata Party

Anil Goyal is an Indian politician from Bharatiya Janata Party from Delhi. He was elected as a Member of the Legislative Assembly in the 8th Delhi Assembly from Krishna Nagar Assembly constituency, defeating the Aam Admi Party's Vikas Bagga by 19,498 votes.
