= S. K. Bagga =

Indian politician (1954–2025)

S.K.Bagga

Member of the Delhi Legislative Assembly for Krishna Nagar
- In office February 2015 – 8 February 2025
- Preceded by: Harsh Vardhan
- Succeeded by: Anil Goyal

Personal details
- Born: 7 February 1954
- Died: 5 March 2025 (aged 71)
- Party: Aam Aadmi Party
- Education: Meerut University

S. K. Bagga (7 February 1954 – 5 March 2025) was an Indian politician and member of the Sixth Legislative Assembly of Delhi. A member of the Aam Aadmi Party, he represented Krishna Nagar (Assembly constituency) of Delhi.

== Early life and education ==
S. K. Bagga was the son of S. L. Bagga. He was a lawyer and a social worker. He was an M. COM (post-graduate) and became an advocate (LLB) from Meerut University, Uttar Pradesh in 1992.

Bagga and his family were part of the 2011 Indian anti-corruption movement under the leadership of Anna Hazare. He was the president of the Bhagwan Shri Ram Chander Dusshera Dharmik Committee from 1993 until his death. The organization works for education of underprivileged children.

Bagga was a resident of Krishna Nagar, Delhi and worked in the area as a lawyer and a social worker for more than 40 years.

== Political career ==
Bagga contested from Krishna Nagar constituency in the 2015 Delhi Legislative Assembly elections from the AAP against Kiran Bedi, the chief ministerial candidate of the Bharatiya Janata Party (BJP). He raised the issue of a simplified Value-added tax (VAT) as well as other issues of traders. He got 65,919 votes and defeated his nearest rival Bedi by a margin of 2,277 votes.

Krishna Nagar had previously been held by Harsh Vardhan of the BJP (since 1993), who vacated the seat when he was elected to the Indian Parliament in the 2014 Indian general elections. It was considered a bastion of the BJP and a "safe" seat for BJP, which banked on Harsh Vardhan's work in the assembly. Bagga's win was considered a "shocking" upset and earned him sobriquets like "man of the match", "giant killer" and "show stealer". The previously little-known Bagga rose to instant fame, after his victory. Bagga said that his victory was due to his work in the area, while Bedi, who does not reside in the area, was an "outsider".

=== Member of Legislative Assembly (2015–2020) ===
Between 2015 and 2020, he was a Member of the Sixth Legislative Assembly of Delhi representing Krishna Nagar Assembly constituency.

=== Member of Legislative Assembly (2020–2025) ===
From 2020 to 2025, he was an elected member of the 7th Delhi Assembly representing Krishna Nagar Assembly constituency.

Committee assignments of Delhi Legislative Assembly

- Member (2022–2023), Committee on Estimates

== Death ==
Bagga died on 5 March 2025, at the age of 71.

== See also ==
- Delhi Legislative Assembly
- Government of India
- Politics of India

State Legislative Assembly
Preceded by Harsh Vardhan	Member of the Delhi Legislative Assembly from Krishna Nagar Assembly constituency 2015–2025	Succeeded by Anil Goyal
