= Mahatma Gandhi Pravasi Suraksha Yojana =

Defunct Indian government scheme

Mahatma Gandhi Pravasi Suraksha Yojana was a special social security scheme which included Pension and Life Insurance, introduced by Ministry of Overseas Indian Affairs for the overseas Indian workers in possession of Emigration Check Required (ECR) passports.

It was a voluntary scheme designed to help workers to meet their three financial needs: saving for retirement, saving for their return and resettlement, and providing free life insurance offering coverage for death from natural causes.

The scheme was discontinued by the Government of India, in 2017 due to very low subscriber numbers and lack of interest.
