= Harsh Vardhan (Delhi politician) =

Indian politician (born 1954)

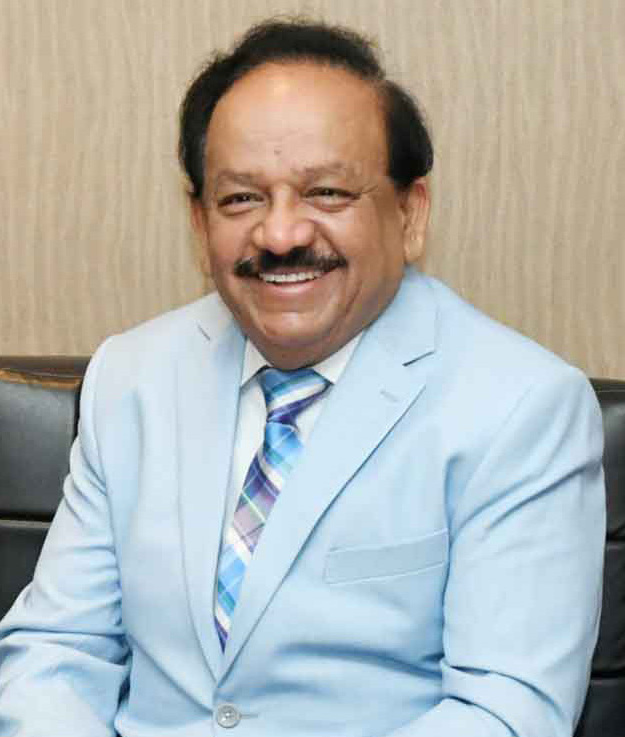
- Vardhan at the inauguration of India-Canada Technology Summit, in New Delhi, 2017

Chairman of the WHO Executive Board
- In office 22 May 2020 – 2 June 2021
- Preceded by: Hiroki Nakatani
- Succeeded by: Patrick Amoth

Minister of Health and Family Welfare
- In office 30 May 2019 – 7 July 2021
- Prime Minister: Narendra Modi
- Preceded by: Jagat Prakash Nadda
- Succeeded by: Mansukh L. Mandaviya
- In office 26 May 2014 – 9 November 2014
- Prime Minister: Narendra Modi
- Preceded by: Ghulam Nabi Azad
- Succeeded by: Jagat Prakash Nadda

Minister of Science and Technology
- In office 9 November 2014 – 7 July 2021
- Prime Minister: Narendra Modi
- Preceded by: Jitendra Singh
- Succeeded by: Jitendra Singh

Minister of Earth Sciences
- In office 9 November 2014 – 7 July 2021
- Prime Minister: Narendra Modi
- Preceded by: Jitendra Singh
- Succeeded by: Jitendra Singh

Member of Parliament, Lok Sabha
- In office 16 May 2014 – 4 June 2024
- Preceded by: Kapil Sibal
- Succeeded by: Praveen Khandelwal
- Constituency: Chandni Chowk

Minister of Environment, Forest and Climate Change
- In office 27 May 2017 – 30 May 2019
- Prime Minister: Narendra Modi
- Preceded by: Anil Madhav Dave
- Succeeded by: Prakash Javadekar

Member of the Delhi Legislative Assembly
- In office 2 December 1993 – 16 May 2014
- Preceded by: Constituency established
- Succeeded by: S. K. Bagga
- Constituency: Krishna Nagar

Personal details
- Born: Harshvardhan Goel; 13 December 1954 (age 71) Delhi, India
- Party: Bharatiya Janata Party
- Spouse: Nutan Goel
- Children: 3
- Education: Zakir Husain College, Delhi; Ganesh Shankar Vidyarthi Memorial Medical College (MBBS) and (MS)
- Profession: Otorhinolaryngologist; Politician

Harsh Vardhan (born Harshvardhan Goel, 13 December 1954) is an Indian politician and otorhinolaryngologist. He had served as the Minister of Health and Family Welfare, Minister of Science and Technology and Minister of Earth Sciences in the BJP-led NDA government of Prime Minister Narendra Modi from 30 May 2019 to 7 July 2021. He represented Chandni Chowk in Delhi as a Member of Parliament in the 17th Lok Sabha. He was elected to the office of chairperson of the executive board of the World Health Organization from 22 May 2020. Vardhan has been prominent in the Indian government's response to the COVID-19 pandemic. He later resigned from his cabinet post ahead of the cabinet reshuffle in July 2021.

He retired from active politics on 4 March 2024 after allegedly being denied a ticket for the 2024 Lok Sabha elections.

== Early life ==
Harsh Vardhan was born in Delhi to Om Prakash Goel and Sneh Lata Goel. Vardhan finished his schooling from Happy School, Daryaganj, in 1971. He attended Zakir Husain Delhi College of the University of Delhi and Ganesh Shankar Vidyarthi Memorial Medical College of the Kanpur University, where he graduated in 1979 with a Bachelor of Medicine, Bachelor of Surgery. He earned his Master of Surgery in Otorhinolaryngology from the same college in 1983. He has been a member of the Rashtriya Swayamsevak Sangh since childhood.

== Political career ==
In 1993, Vardhan was elected as a member of the Delhi Assembly representing Krishna Nagar. He was appointed as the State Minister of Health and Minister of Law for Delhi. He later became the state Minister of Education in 1996. He has been re-elected from the same constituency in the 1998, 2003, 2008 and 2013 elections.

=== Minister of Health and Family Affairs of Delhi ===
Vardhan as the State Minister of Health in 1994 oversaw the implementation of the pilot project of the Pulse Polio Programme which involved the mass immunisation of 1 million children up to the age of 3 in Delhi. In 1995, this programme was launched nationwide leading to 88 million children being immunised. On 28 March 2014, India was declared polio-free by the WHO, as there had been no reported cases for three years.

In 1997, the Delhi Prohibition of Smoking and Non-Smokers Health Protection Act was passed in the Delhi assembly which was one of the first anti-tobacco laws implemented by any state government. The act applied across the NCT of Delhi. It prohibited smoking in places of public work or use for example hospitals, restaurants, and educational institutions and in public service vehicles. It also prohibited the sale of smoking substances such as tobacco and beedis to anyone below the age of eighteen. Smoking products could not also be sold or stored within 100 metres of any educational institution. Under the provisions of the act, fines would be applied to anyone who contravened the law and they could potentially be ejected from places of public use by the police.

=== 2013 Delhi Assembly elections ===
On 23 October 2013, Vardhan was named the Chief Minister candidate for Delhi Assembly elections by the BJP. After the 2013 elections, BJP emerged as the single largest party winning 31 out of the 70 seats in the Fifth Legislative Assembly of Delhi. However, they fell short of an absolute majority so were unable to form the government.

=== 2014 Lok Sabha election ===
Vardhan contested the Chandni Chowk seat in Delhi where he defeated the incumbent Union Minister of Law and Justice, Kapil Sibal of the Indian National Congress. He was also appointed in the first Narendra Modi government as Minister of Health and Family Welfare on 26 May 2014. In May 2017, he was given the additional charge of Ministry of Environment, Forest and Climate Change following the death of Minister Anil Madhav Dave.

=== 2019 Lok Sabha election ===
Vardhan again contested the Chandni Chowk seat in Delhi where he defeated Congress candidate Jai Parkash Aggarwal by a margin of 2,28,145 votes. While he received 52.94% votes, runner-up Aggarwal polled 29.67% votes.

=== As Union Minister ===
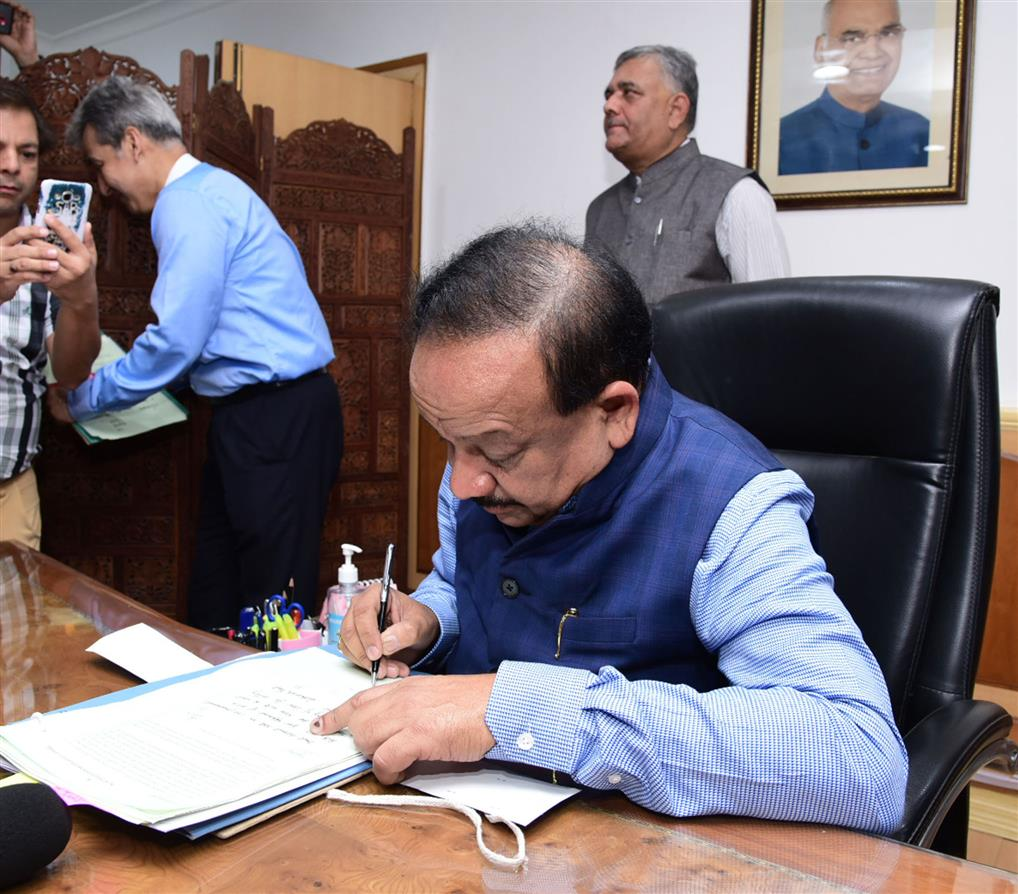
Vardhan taking charge as the Union Minister for Health and Family Welfare on 3 June 2019.

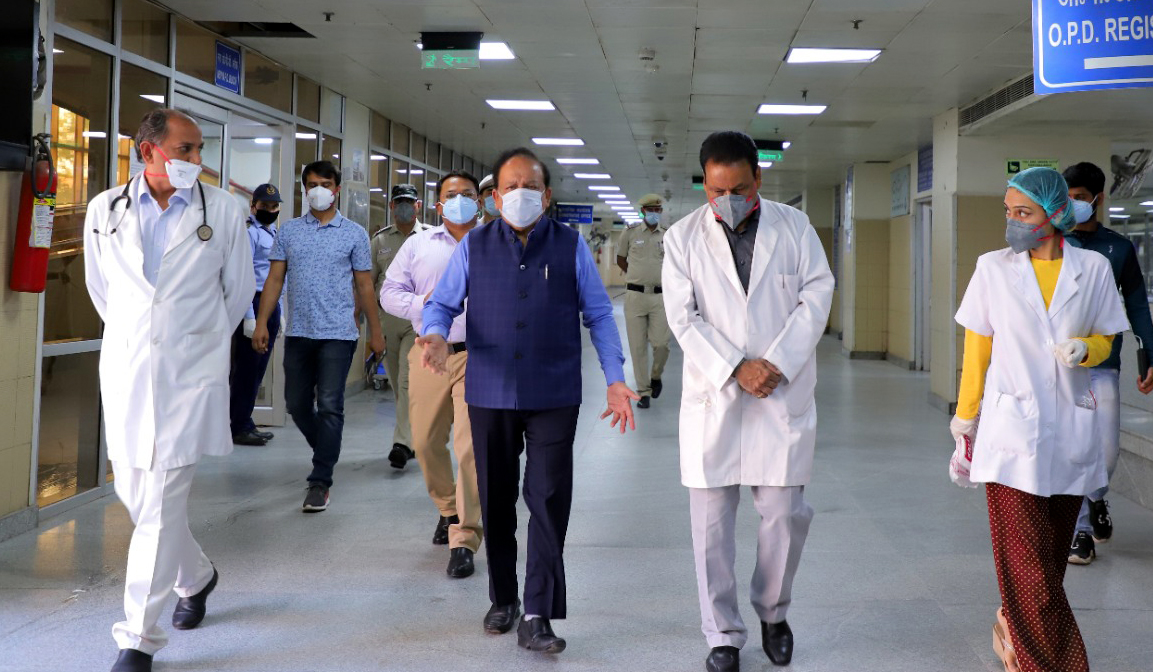
Dr. Vardhan visiting the Lok Nayak Jaiprakash Narayan Hospital to take stock of preparedness to overcome COVID-19, in New Delhi on 4 April 2020.

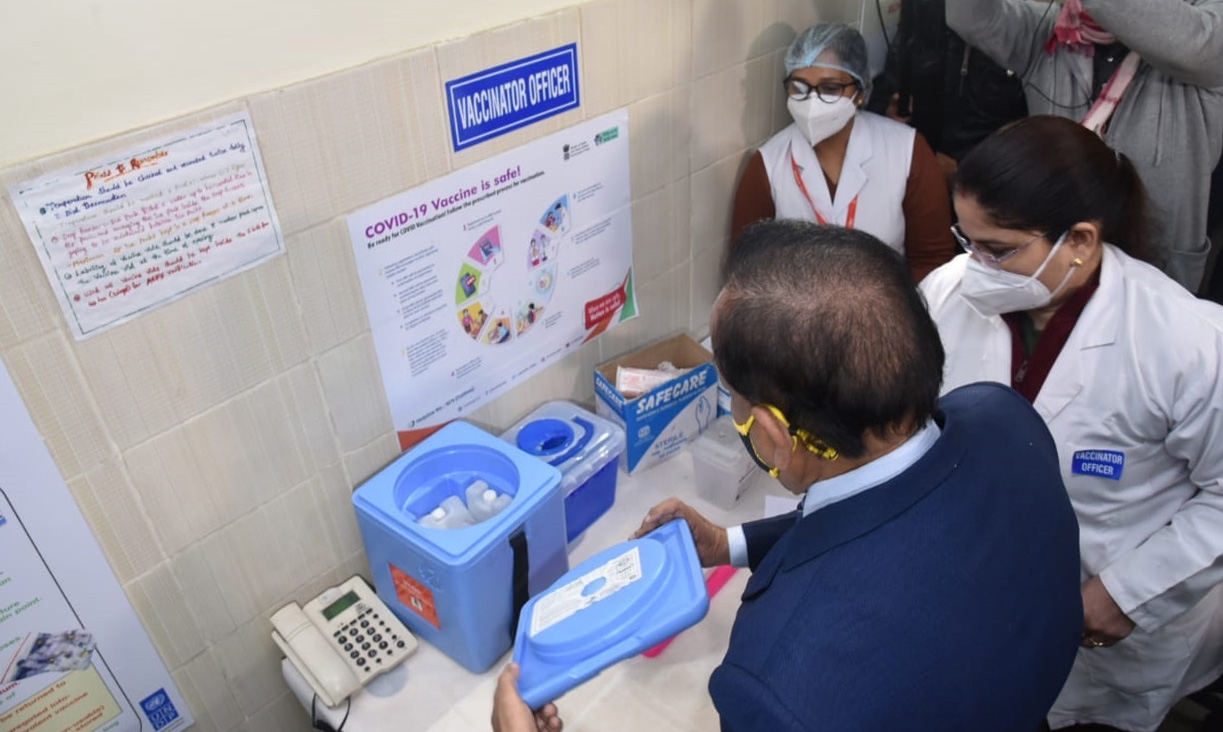
Dr. Vardhan visiting the GTB Hospital, Shahdara, Delhi, to review the preparedness to overcome COVID-19, in New Delhi on 2 January 2021.

In the First Modi ministry, Vardhan briefly led the Ministry of Health and Family Welfare in 2014 before being reassigned to the Ministry of Science and Technology and Ministry of Earth Sciences from 2014 to 2021. During his first stint as Minister of Health and Family Welfare, Vardhan was criticised for his indifference to the Central Drugs Standard Control Organisation's failure to regulate quality control issues among Indian manufacturers of generic drugs.

From 2017 to 2019, Vardhan led the Ministry of Environment, Forest and Climate Change and from 2019 to 2021, he returned to leading the Ministry of Health and Family Welfare in the Second Modi ministry. During the COVID-19 pandemic in India, Vardhan endorsed an untested herbal cure devised by yoga guru Ramdev, prompting criticism from health experts. In early March 2021, he erroneously declared that the country was in the "endgame" of the pandemic, shortly before infections across the country rose dramatically in an April second wave. Vardhan declared that children of health care workers who died during COVID-19 pandemic should be reserved seats in MBBS and BDS colleges.

== Controversies ==
At the 105th Indian Science Congress in March 2018, after the death of legendary British scientist Stephen Hawking, Vardhan claimed that Hawking had said that the Vedas postulated a theory superior to Albert Einstein's theory of relativity, despite the fact that there is no record of Hawking having made the statement.

In 2019, after the Health Effects Institute released a scientific report estimating 1.2 million annual deaths in India due to air pollution, Vardhan denied the results, arguing that this report was intended to create panic. In 2021, Indian Medical Association (IMA), the largest association of doctors in India, issued a statement which it objected to Vardhan who was endorsing Coronil, a product of Patanjali Ayurved. IMA questioned the ethics of a national health minister releasing a fabricated and unscientific product.

In 2023, a legislator from the ruling Bharatiya Janata Party (BJP) made Islamophobic remarks and used communal slurs against a Muslim MP inside the parliament. During a Thursday night debate on 22 September 2023 on the success of India's historic moon mission, BJP MP Ramesh Bidhuri called Kunwar Danish Ali of the opposition Bahujan Samaj Party (BSP) a "terrorist" and a "pimp" among other anti-Islamic slurs. Dr Harsh Vardhan came under attack after a video footage of the incident went viral on social media. In the video clip, he was seen sitting behind Ramesh Bidhuri and appeared to be laughing.

== Awards and honours ==
Vardhan has received the following awards and recognitions:

- IMA President's Special Award of Appreciation by the Indian Medical Association in 1994.
- Director-General's Polio Eradication Champion Award Commendation Medal by the World Health Organization in 1998.
- Polio Eradication Champion Award by the Rotary International in 2001.
- "Doctor of the last Decade" (Swasthya Ratna) by Indian Medical Association's New Delhi branch in 2002.
- Director-General's Special World No Tobacco Day Award, by WHO in 2021, for bringing legislation to ban e-cigarettes and Heated tobacco products, on the occasion of World No Tobacco Day.

== Personal life ==
Vardhan is married to Nutan, and they have two sons and one daughter.

== Bibliography ==
- A Tale of Two Drops. New Delhi: Prabhat Prakashan. 2018. p. 218. ISBN 9788184305197.

== See also ==
- Pulse Polio programme in India
- Fifth Legislative Assembly of Delhi

Lok Sabha
Preceded by Kapil Sibal	Member of Parliament for Chandni Chowk; 2014 – present	Succeeded by Incumbent
Political offices
Preceded by Ghulam Nabi Azad	Minister of Health and Family Welfare; 26 May 2014 – 9 November 2014	Succeeded by Jagat Prakash Nadda
Preceded by Jitendra Singh; Minister of State (Independent Charge)	Minister of Science and Technology; 9 November 2014 – 7 July 2021	Succeeded by Jitendra Singh; Minister of State (Independent Charge)
Preceded by Jitendra Singh; Minister of State (Independent Charge)	Minister of Earth Sciences; 9 November 2014 – 7 July 2021	Succeeded by Jitendra Singh; Minister of State (Independent Charge)
Preceded by Anil Madhav Dave	Minister of Environment, Forest and Climate Change; 18 May 2017 – 29 May 2019	Succeeded by Prakash Javadekar
Preceded by Jagat Prakash Nadda	Minister of Health and Family Welfare; 30 May 2019 – 7 July 2021	Succeeded by Mansukh L. Mandaviya
