= Mohan Kundariya =

Indian politician

Mohanbhai Kundariya
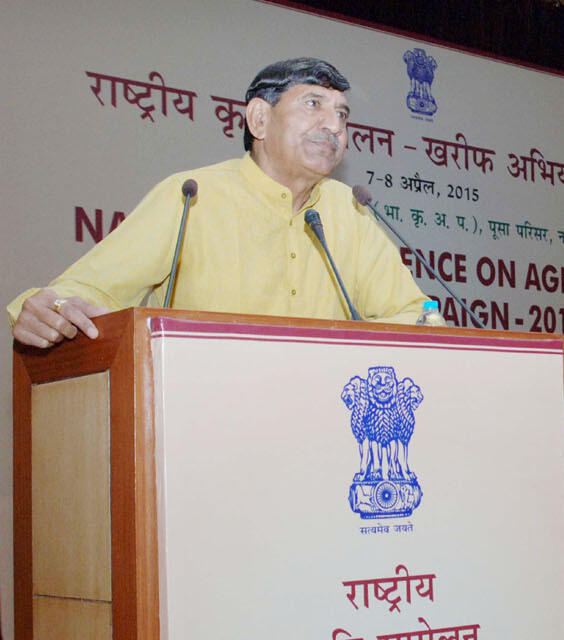
- Kundariya in 2015

Minister of State for Agriculture and Farmers' Welfare
- In office 9 November 2014 – 5 July 2016
- Prime Minister: Narendra Modi
- Minister: Radha Mohan Singh

Member of Parliament, Lok Sabha
- In office 16 May 2014 – 2024
- Preceded by: Kunwarjibhai Bavaliya
- Succeeded by: Parshottam Rupala
- Constituency: Rajkot

Member of Gujarat Legislative Assembly
- In office 1995–2014
- Preceded by: Keshubahi Patel
- Succeeded by: Bavanjibhai Metaliya
- Constituency: Tankara

Personal details
- Born: 6 September 1951 (age 74) Rajkot, Saurashtra, India
- Party: Bharatiya Janata Party
- Spouse: Amrutben Kundariya (m. 1973)
- Children: 3
- Occupation: Agriculturist

Mohanbhai Kalyanjibhai Kundariya (born 6 September 1951) is an Indian politician and a former Union Minister of State for Agriculture and Farmer Welfare in the Government of India. He was also elected to Gujarat Legislative Assembly from Tankara assembly constituency of Rajkot district.

== Career ==
He served as Minister of State from May 2014 to 5 July 2016.

== Personal life ==
Twelve of Kundariya's family members, including his sister, were killed during the 2022 Morbi bridge collapse.
