= Prakash Javadekar =

Indian politician

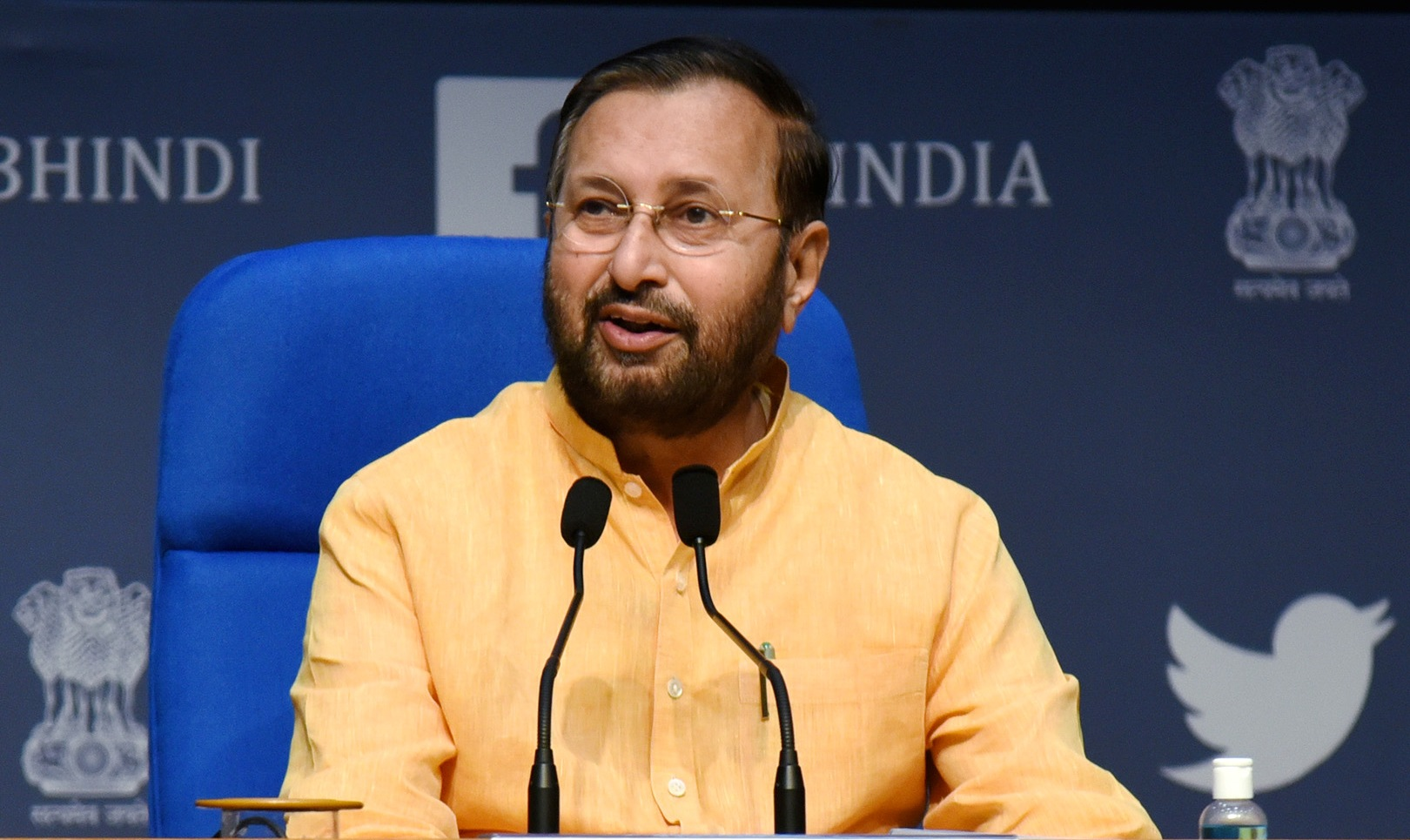
- Javadekar in October 2020

Minister of Information and Broadcasting
- In office 30 May 2019 – 7 July 2021
- Prime Minister: Narendra Modi
- Preceded by: Rajyavardhan Singh Rathore
- Succeeded by: Anurag Singh Thakur
- In office 26 May 2014 – 9 November 2014
- Prime Minister: Narendra Modi
- Preceded by: Manish Tewari
- Succeeded by: Arun Jaitley

Minister of Environment, Forest and Climate Change
- In office 30 May 2019 – 7 July 2021
- Prime Minister: Narendra Modi
- Preceded by: Harsh Vardhan
- Succeeded by: Bhupender Yadav
- In office 26 May 2014 – 5 July 2016
- Prime Minister: Narendra Modi
- Preceded by: Veerappa Moily
- Succeeded by: Anil Madhav Dave

Minister of Heavy Industries and Public Enterprises
- In office 12 November 2019 – 7 July 2021
- Prime Minister: Narendra Modi
- Preceded by: Arvind Sawant
- Succeeded by: Mahendra Nath Pandey

Minister of Human Resource Development
- In office 5 July 2016 – 30 May 2019
- Prime Minister: Narendra Modi
- Preceded by: Smriti Irani
- Succeeded by: Ramesh Pokhriyal

Minister of State for Parliamentary Affairs
- In office 26 May 2014 – 9 November 2014
- Prime Minister: Narendra Modi
- Preceded by: Rajeev Shukla
- Succeeded by: Mukhtar Abbas Naqvi

Member of Parliament, Rajya Sabha
- In office 3 April 2018 – 2 April 2024
- Preceded by: Ajay Sancheti
- Succeeded by: Medha Kulkarni
- Constituency: Maharashtra
- In office 13 June 2014 – 2 April 2018
- Preceded by: Faggan Singh Kulaste
- Succeeded by: Dharmendra Pradhan
- Constituency: Madhya Pradesh
- In office 2008–2014
- Constituency: Maharashtra

Member of the Maharashtra Legislative Council
- In office 1990–2002
- Constituency: Pune Graduates

Personal details
- Born: 30 January 1951 (age 75) Village Apta in Panvel Taluka, Raigad District, India (Maharashtra, India)
- Party: Bharatiya Janata Party
- Spouse: Prachee
- Children: 2
- Relatives: Suhas Javadekar (brother)
- Education: University of Pune
- Website: Prakash Javdekar Website

Prakash Keshav Javadekar (born 30 January 1951) is an Indian politician and former parliamentarian. He served as the Minister of Environment, Forest and Climate Change two times, from May 2014 to July 2016 and from May 2019 to July 2021.

Javadekar was elected to the upper house Rajya Sabha as a Member of Parliament from Maharashtra in 2008, and re-elected from Madhya Pradesh in 2014.

Following the victory of the Bharatiya Janata Party in the 2014 Indian General Election, he was appointed Minister of State (Independent Charge) for Environment, Forests and Climate Change by Prime Minister Narendra Modi. He was also a Minister of State for Parliamentary Affairs, and briefly held the portfolio of Information and Broadcasting.

Javadekar is an official spokesperson of the BJP.

== Early life ==
In 1967 he has passed 10th grade from New English School, Ramanbaug. Javadekar has a B.Com.(Hons) from the University of Pune. He also has a brother, Suhas Javadekar.

== Political career ==
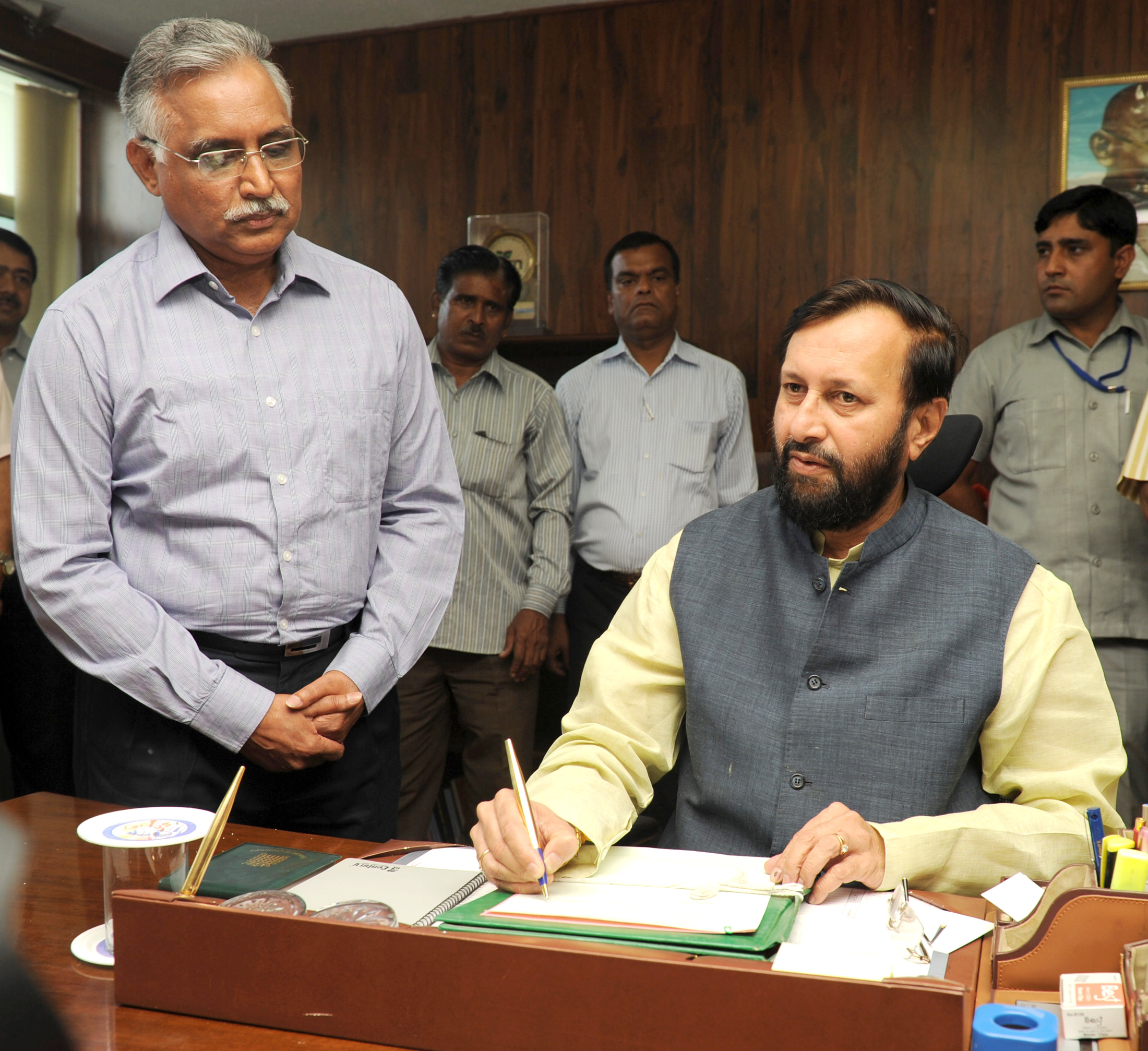
Prakash Javadekar taking charge as the Minister of State (Independent Charge) for Environment, Forest and Climate Change, in New Delhi on May 29, 2014

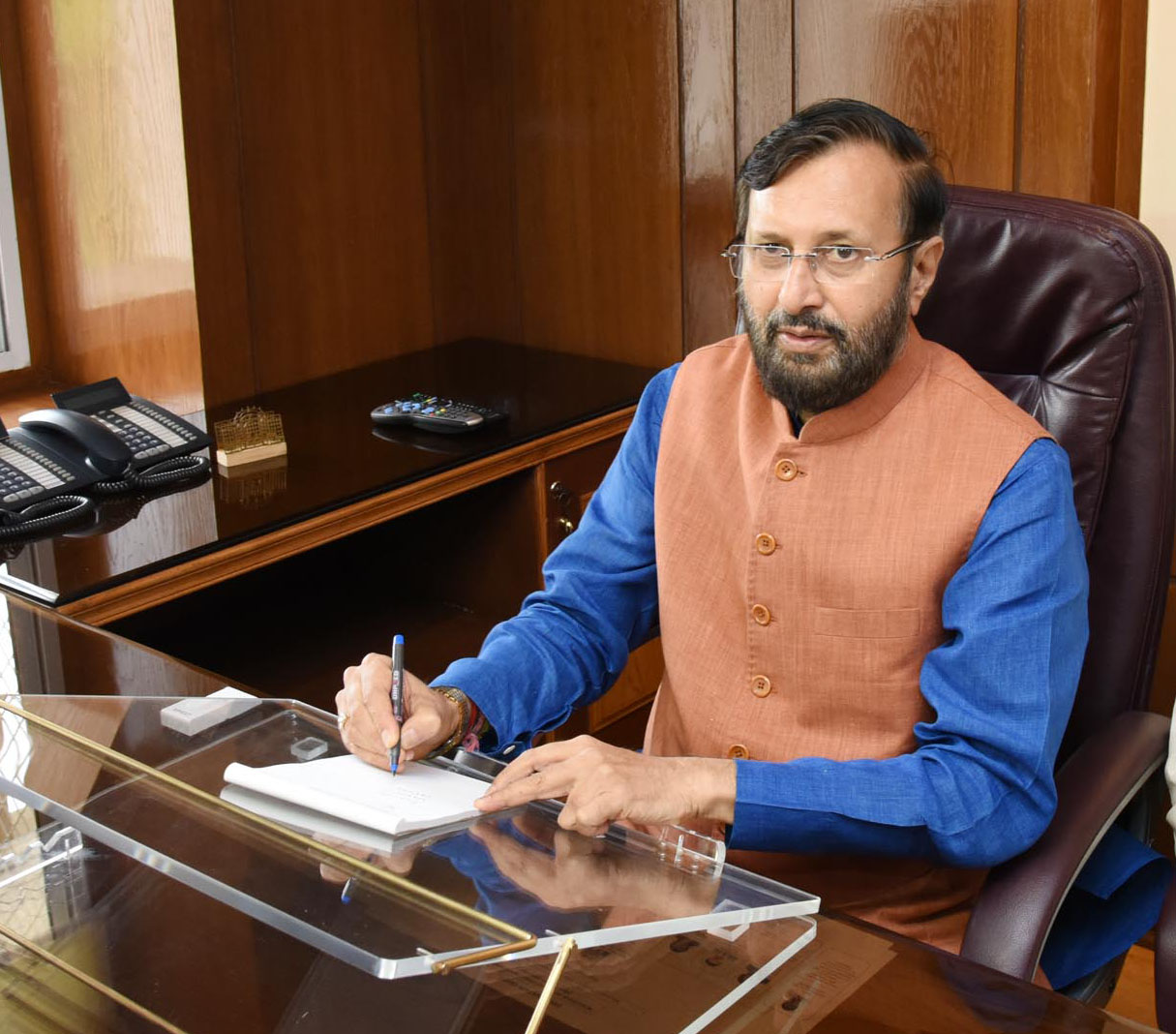
Prakash Javadekar takes charge as Union Minister for Human Resource Development, in New Delhi on July 07, 2016

Active in politics since his college days, Javadekar was a member of Akhil Bharatiya Vidyarthi Parishad, a student organization. During the Emergency declared by Prime Minister Indira Gandhi between 1975 and 1977, Javadekar participated in student movements against the government.

From 1984 to 1990, Javadekar was a National Secretary and then General Secretary in the Bharatiya Janata Yuva Morcha. In 1989, he was appointed State Secretary and Campaign Chief of the Bharatiya Janata Party in Maharashtra, a position he held till 1995. Javadekar was elected to the Maharashtra Legislative Council between 1990 and 2002. He also occupied the positions of the Executive President of the State Planning Board and Chairman of the Task Force on IT in the Government of Maharashtra.

In 2008, Javadekar was elected to the Rajya Sabha as a Member of Parliament from Maharashtra. He was re-elected from Madhya Pradesh in 2014.

Following the victory of the Bharatiya Janata Party in the 2014 Indian General Election, Javadekar was appointed Minister State (Independent Charge) for Environment, Forests and Climate Change by Prime Minister Narendra Modi. He was also appointed as a Minister of State for Parliamentary Affairs. He led the Indian delegation to the 2015 United Nations Climate Change Conference.

Between May and November 2014, he was also Minister of State for Information and Broadcasting. After taking charge of his ministry, Javadekar notably said that “the media itself suffices for self-regulation. Institutions are important for the functioning of democracy and priorities would be worked out after due consultation with the stakeholders”.

Javadekar was appointed as the Human Resource and Development Minister of India on 5 July 2016 and held the post until 30 May 2019 when he was succeeded by Ramesh Pokhriyal. He is also a spokesperson of the Bharatiya Janata Party. Before becoming a National Spokesperson, he was a Spokesperson for the Maharashtra BJP. He has also previously in-charge of the BJP's Economic Forum and Cells related to the economy.

On 31 May 2012, based on Javadekar's complaints about various irregularities in coal mining, the Central Vigilance Commission (CVC) directed a CBI enquiry. He said, "We have made a formal complaint to CVC because there were so many glaring lacunae which needed to be probed. If the inquiry has been ordered, it's good."

Javdekar's ministry conducts a common admission process for national institutes via the Joint Seat Allocation Authority. In 2016 more than 3000 seats were still vacant in the 92 institutes involved in the system, leading to calls for a further round of placements to fill the vacancies. To date the ministry has refused to conduct a "spot round" of further placements.

In May 2019, Javadekar became the Cabinet Minister for Environment, Forest and Climate Change and Information and Broadcasting.

In July 2021, Prakash Javadekar was removed from all posts of cabinet ministers in Government of India. He was appointed as BJP’s election in-charge for Telangana on 7 July 2023.

== Personal life ==
He is married to Prachee Javadekar and has two sons. Javadekar's wife Prachee Javadekar, an education researcher and consultant, is a former director of Indira Institute of Management, Pune. He has two sons, one who is a dentist and an artist, and the other is Assistant Professor of Finance at Indian School of Business.

== Positions held ==
- Union Minister of Human Resource Development - (5 July 2016 to 30 May 2019)
- Union Minister of State (Independent Charge) for Environment, Forests, and Climate Change portfolio.
- Member of Parliament, Rajya Sabha (UP) as a candidate from BJP
- October 2011 onwards - Member, Committee on the Implementation of the Right to Education Act
- Union Minister of State (Independent Charge) for Information and Broadcasting (May 2014 - November 2014)
- Union Minister of State for Parliamentary Affairs (May 2014 - November 2014)
- Member of Parliament, Rajya Sabha (Maharashtra) (2008–14)
- Member, Standing Committee on Defence (2008–10 and 2012–14)
- Member, Press Council of India (2010–14)
- Member, Standing Committee on Human Resources and Development (2010–12)
- Member, Public Accounts Committee
- Member, Consultative Committee for Ministry of Power
- Member, Committee on Subordinate Legislation
- Member, Committee on Waqf
- Chairman, Working Group on "IT for Masses", Government of India. (2000)
- President, NOINO (National Organization of Insurance Officers)
- President, KCKU (Khadi Commission Karmachari Union)
- Executive President, State Planning Board Maharashtra (1995-1999)
- Member of Legislative Council – Maharashtra from the Pune Division Graduate Constituency (1990-2002)
- Chairman, TASK FORCE ON IT, Government of Maharashtra (1997-1999)
- President, GLOBE India (Global Legislators Organisation for Balanced Environment)

== Books published ==
In Marathi:

- (i) Bekaricha Jwalamukhi (Problem of Unemployment), 1986,
- (ii) Nanenidhiche Karz (IMF Loans), 1987
- (iii) Shetkaryanchi Karzmukti (Farmers' Loan Waiver), 1988
- (iv) Mahangaicha Bhasmasur (Problem of Inflation), 1999 and 2010
- Presented over 300 articles in various newspapers on contemporary subjects; has also written many booklets on unemployment, inflation, IMF loans and other political issues

Political offices
Preceded by Manish Tewari	Minister of Information and Broadcasting; 26 May 2014 - 9 November 2014	Succeeded by Arun Jaitley
Preceded by Veerappa Moily	Minister of Environment, Forest and Climate Change; 26 May 2014 - 5 July 2016; Minister of State with Independent charge	Succeeded by Anil Madhav Dave
Preceded by Smriti Irani	Minister of Human Resource Development; 5 July 2016 - 30 May 2019	Succeeded by Ramesh Pokhriyal
Preceded by Harsh Vardhan	Minister of Environment, Forest and Climate Change; 30 May 2019 - 7 May 2021	Succeeded by Bhupender Yadav
Preceded by Rajyavardhan Singh Rathore; Minister of State with Independent charge	Minister of Information and Broadcasting; 30 May 2019 - 7 May 2021	Succeeded by Anurag Thakur
Preceded by Arvind Sawant	Minister of Heavy Industries and Public Enterprises; 11 November 2019 - 7 July 2021	Succeeded by Mahendra Nath Pandey
