= Ministry of Overseas Indian Affairs =

Former government ministry of India

- Pravāsī Bhāratīya Kārya Mantrālaya
- Emblem of India

Ministry overview
- Formed: May 2004
- Dissolved: 7 January 2016
- Superseding Ministry: Ministry of External Affairs
- Jurisdiction: Government of India
- Headquarters: Akbar Bhawan, Chanakyapuri, New Delhi
- Website: www.mea.gov.in/overseas-indian-affairs.htm

The Ministry of Overseas Indian Affairs (MOIA) was a ministry of the Government of India. It was dedicated to all matters relating to the Indian diaspora around the world.

== History ==
Ministry was established in May 2004 as the Ministry of Non-Resident Indians' Affairs. It was renamed as the Ministry of Overseas Indian Affairs (MOIA) in September 2004.

Positioned as a ‘Services’ Ministry, it provided information, partnerships and facilitations for all matters related to Overseas Indians: Non-Resident Indian and Person of Indian Origin.

The Ministry was merged with the Ministry of External Affairs on 7 January 2016. The government said that the decision was taken in line with government's "overall objective of minimizing government and maximizing governance" and that it will help the government address duplication as well as unnecessary delays.

== Structure ==
The Ministry had four functional service divisions to handle its services:

- Diaspora Services
- Financial Services
- Emigration Services
- Management Services

The first two divisions were headed by Joint Secretaries. The Protector General of Emigrants (PGoE) headed the Overseas Employment Services Division. The Social Services Unit and the Management Services Unit were staffed with officers of the rank of Deputy Secretary. The Information Services Unit was headed by Senior Technical Director (NIC).

The ministry also sponsored the annual Pravasi Bharatiya Divas (Non-resident Indian Day) established in 2003, when it also instituted the annual Pravasi Bharatiya Samman Award.

== Cabinet Ministers ==
- Note: I/C – Independent Charge

Portrait	Minister (Birth-Death) Constituency	Term of office			Political party	Ministry	Prime Minister
Portrait	Minister (Birth-Death) Constituency	From	To	Period	Political party	Ministry	Prime Minister
Minister of Non-Resident Indian Affairs
	Jagdish Tytler (born 1944); MP for Delhi Sadar (Minister of State, I/C)	23 May 2004	9 September 2004	109 days	Indian National Congress	Manmohan I	Manmohan Singh
Minister of Overseas Indian Affairs
	Jagdish Tytler (born 1944); MP for Delhi Sadar (Minister of State, I/C)	9 September 2004	10 August 2005	335 days	Indian National Congress	Manmohan I	Manmohan Singh
	Manmohan Singh (born 1932); Rajya Sabha MP for Assam (Prime Minister)	10 August 2005	18 November 2005	100 days	Indian National Congress	Manmohan I	Manmohan Singh
	Oscar Fernandes (1941–2021); Rajya Sabha MP for Karnataka (Minister of State, I/C)	18 November 2005	29 January 2006	72 days	Indian National Congress	Manmohan I	Manmohan Singh
	Vayalar Ravi (born 1937); Rajya Sabha MP for Kerala	29 January 2006	22 May 2009	8 years, 117 days	Indian National Congress	Manmohan I	Manmohan Singh
	Vayalar Ravi (born 1937); Rajya Sabha MP for Kerala	28 May 2009	26 May 2014	8 years, 117 days	Indian National Congress	Manmohan II	Manmohan Singh
	Sushma Swaraj (1952–2019); MP for Vidisha	27 May 2014	7 January 2016	1 year, 226 days	Bharatiya Janata Party	Modi I	Narendra Modi
Merged with the Ministry of External Affairs

== Ministers of State ==
Portrait	Minister (Birth-Death) Constituency	Term of office			Political party	Ministry	Prime Minister
Portrait	Minister (Birth-Death) Constituency	From	To	Period	Political party	Ministry	Prime Minister
	General; V. K. Singh (Retd.); PVSM AVSM YSM ADC (born 1950); MP for Ghaziabad	26 May 2014	7 January 2016	1 year, 226 days	Bharatiya Janata Party	Modi I	Narendra Modi
Merged with the Ministry of External Affairs

== See also ==
- Indian diaspora
- Pravasi Bharatiya Samman
- Pravasi Bharatiya Divas
- Mahatma Gandhi Pravasi Suraksha Yojana
