= 2012 Indian cabinet reshuffle =

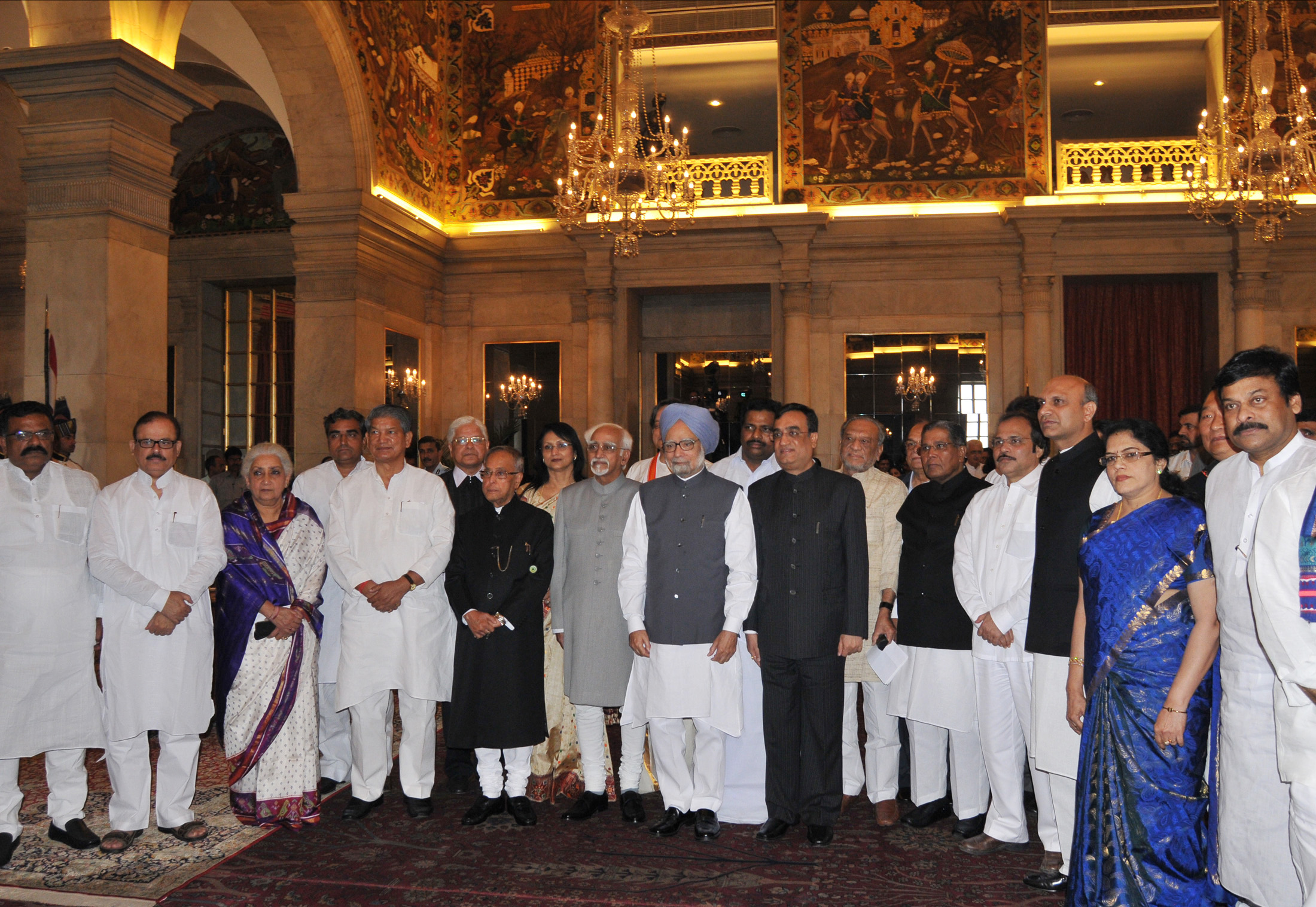
President Pranab Mukherjee, Vice President Hamid Ansari, and Prime Minister Manmohan Singh along with the newly sworn in ministers on 28 October 2012.

Indian prime minister Manmohan Singh carried out the third significant reshuffle of his second ministry between 28 October and 2 November 2012, having last done so in July 2011.

The cabinet reshuffle was carried out in three phases, first on 28 October 2012, second on 31 October 2012, and the third on 2 November 2012. The first phase was the major phase of the reshuffle in which the prime minister dropped four cabinet ministers and three ministers of state. Two parliamentarians were inducted to the ministry as cabinet ministers and five ministers of state were promoted to cabinet rank. Five ministers of state were assigned independent charge of ministries, and two new ministers of state with independent charge were appointed. Thirteen new ministers of state were also inducted. The portfolios of several ministers were also changed.

== Background ==
Finance Minister Pranab Mukherjee resigned from the ministry following his nomination for the presidential election along with Micro, Small and Medium Enterprises Minister Virbhadra Singh on 26 June 2012. Prime Minister Manmohan Singh assumed the charge of finance ministry while Science and Technology and Earth Sciences Minister Vilasrao Deshmukh was assigned the additional portfolio of Micro, Small and Medium Enterprises.

A minor reshuffle of the ministry took place on 31 July 2012 in which Home Minister P. Chidambaram was appointed as the finance minister, Power Minister Sushilkumar Shinde was appointed as the home minister, and Corporate Affairs Minister Veerappa Moily was assigned the additional portfolio as power minister.

Science and Technology, Earth Sciences, and Micro, Small and Medium Enterprises Minister Vilasrao Deshmukh became critically ill and ultimately died on 14 August 2012. The portfolios held by him were assigned to Overseas Indian Affairs Minister Vayalar Ravi. On 22 September 2012, all ministers belonging to the Trinamool Congress resigned from the ministry. Road Transport and Highways Minister C. P. Joshi was assigned the additional charge of the Minister of Railways, earlier held by Mukul Roy of the Trinamool Congress.

== Cabinet-level changes ==
Colour key
- Joined the cabinet
- Promoted
- Left the cabinet

Minister	Position before reshuffle	Position after reshuffle
S. M. Krishna	Minister of External Affairs	Resigned from the government
M. Veerappa Moily	Minister of Corporate Affairs; Minister of Power	Minister of Petroleum and Natural Gas
S. Jaipal Reddy	Minister of Petroleum and Natural Gas	Minister of Science and Technology; Minister of Earth Sciences
Vayalar Ravi	Minister of Overseas Indian Affairs; Minister of Science and Technology; Minister of Earth Sciences; Minister of Micro, Small and Medium Enterprises	Minister of Overseas Indian Affairs
Kamal Nath	Minister of Urban Development	Minister of Urban Development; Minister of Parliamentary Affairs
Ambika Soni	Minister of Information and Broadcasting	Resigned from the government
Kapil Sibal	Minister of Human Resource Development; Minister of Communications and Information Technology	Minister of Communications and Information Technology
C. P. Joshi	Minister of Road Transport and Highways; Minister of Railways	Minister of Road Transport and Highways
Kumari Selja	Minister of Housing and Urban Poverty Alleviation; Minister of Culture	Minister of Social Justice and Empowerment
Subodh Kant Sahay	Minister of Tourism	Resigned from the government
Pawan Kumar Bansal	Minister of Parliamentary Affairs; Minister of Water Resources	Minister of Railways
Mukul Wasnik	Minister of Social Justice and Empowerment	Resigned from the government
Salman Khurshid	Minister of Minority Affairs; Minister of Law and Justice	Minister of External Affairs
Jairam Ramesh	Minister of Rural Development; Minister of Drinking Water and Sanitation	Minister of Rural Development
K. Rahman Khan	Rajya Sabha MP	Minister of Minority Affairs
Dinsha Patel	Minister of State (Independent Charge) for Mines	Minister of Mines
Ajay Maken	Minister of State (Independent Charge) for Youth Affairs and Sports	Minister of Housing and Urban Poverty Alleviation
M. M. Pallam Raju	Minister of State for Defence	Minister of Human Resource Development
Ashwani Kumar	Minister of State for Planning; Minister of State for Science and Technology; Minister of State for Earth Sciences	Minister of Law and Justice
Harish Rawat	Minister of State for Agriculture; Minister of State for Food Processing Industries; Minister of State for Parliamentary Affairs	Minister of Water Resources
Chandresh Kumari Katoch	Lok Sabha MP	Minister of Culture

== Minister of State-level changes ==
Colour key
- Joined the Cabinet
- Left the Cabinet

Minister	Position before reshuffle	Position after reshuffle
Jyotiraditya Scindia	Minister of State for Commerce and Industry	Minister of State (Independent Charge) for Power
K. H. Muniyappa	Minister of State for Railways	Minister of State (Independent Charge) for Micro, Small and Medium Enterprises
Bharatsinh Solanki	Minister of State for Railways	Minister of State (Independent Charge) for Drinking Water and Sanitation
Sachin Pilot	Minister of State for Communications and Information Technology	Minister of State (Independent Charge) for Corporate Affairs
Jitendra Singh	Minister of State for Home Affairs	Minister of State (Independent Charge) for Youth Affairs and Sports; Minister of State for Defence
Manish Tewari	Lok Sabha MP	Minister of State (Independent Charge) for Information and Broadcasting
K. Chiranjeevi	Rajya Sabha MP	Minister of State (Independent Charge) for Tourism
E. Ahamed	Minister of State for External Affairs; Minister of State for Human Resource Development	Minister of State for External Affairs
Daggubati Purandeswari	Minister of State for Human Resource Development	Minister of State for Commerce and Industry
Jitin Prasada	Minister of State for Road Transport and Highways	Minister of State for Human Resource Development
Mahadeo Singh Khandela	Minister of State for Tribal Affairs	Resigned from the government
S. Jagathrakshakan	Minister of State for Information and Broadcasting	Minister of State for New and Renewable Energy
R. P. N. Singh	Minister of State for Petroleum and Natural Gas; Minister of State for Corporate Affairs	Minister of State for Home Affairs
Vincent Pala	Minister of State for Water Resources; Minister of State for Minority Affairs	Resigned from the government
Agatha Sangma	Minister of State for Rural Development	Resigned from the government
K. C. Venugopal	Minister of State for Power	Minister of State for Civil Aviation
Rajeev Shukla	Minister of State for Parliamentary Affairs	Minister of State for Parliamentary Affairs; Minister of State for Planning
Shashi Tharoor	Lok Sabha MP	Minister of State for Human Resource Development
Kodikunnil Suresh	Lok Sabha MP	Minister of State for Labour and Employment
Tariq Anwar	Rajya Sabha MP	Minister of State for Agriculture; Minister of State for Food Processing Industries
Kotla Jayasurya Prakasha Reddy	Lok Sabha MP	Minister of State for Railways
Ranee Narah	Lok Sabha MP	Minister of State for Tribal Affairs
Adhir Ranjan Chowdhury	Lok Sabha MP	Minister of State for Railways
Abu Hasem Khan Choudhury	Lok Sabha MP	Minister of State for Health and Family Welfare
Sarve Satyanarayana	Lok Sabha MP	Minister of State for Road Transport and Highways
Ninong Ering	Lok Sabha MP	Minister of State for Minority Affairs
Deepa Dasmunsi	Lok Sabha MP	Minister of State for Urban Development
Porika Balram Naik	Lok Sabha MP	Minister of State for Social Justice and Empowerment
Killi Krupa Rani	Lok Sabha MP	Minister of State for Communications and Information Technology
Lalchand Kataria	Lok Sabha MP	Minister of State for Defence

== Subsequent changes ==
=== 30 October 2012 ===
Another reshuffle took place on 31 October 2012 in which Milind Deora was assigned the additional charge as minister of state in the Ministry of Shipping, Lalchand Kataria was moved to the Ministry of Rural Development, and Panabaka Lakshmi to the Ministry of Petroleum and Natural Gas.

Minister	Position before reshuffle	Position after reshuffle
Milind Deora	Minister of State for Communications and Information Technology	Minister of State for Communications and Information Technology; Minister of State for Shipping
Lalchand Kataria	Minister of State for Defence	Minister of State for Rural Development
Panabaka Lakshmi	Minister of State for Textiles	Minister of State for Petroleum and Natural Gas

=== 2 November 2012 ===
S. Jagathrakshakan, who was assigned the portfolio as minister of state in the Ministry of New and Renewable Energy after being moved from the Ministry of Information and Broadcasting, was reassigned the portfolio of minister of state in the Ministry of Commerce and Industry on 2 November 2012.

Minister	Position before reshuffle	Position after reshuffle
S. Jagathrakshakan	Minister of State for New and Renewable Energy	Minister of State for Commerce and Industry

=== 5 March 2013 ===
Months after the major reshuffle in October 2012, on 5 March 2013, Panabaka Lakshmi, Minister of State in the Ministry of Petroleum and Natural Gas was assigned the additional portfolio as minister of state in the Ministry of Textiles, a portfolio she had held prior to the reshuffle between 2009 and 2012.

Minister	Position before reshuffle	Position after reshuffle
Panabaka Lakshmi	Minister of State for Petroleum and Natural Gas	Minister of State for Petroleum and Natural Gas; Minister of State for Textiles
