= Second Manmohan Singh ministry =

Government of India (2009–2014)

Second Manmohan Singh Ministry
- 23rd ministry of the Republic of India
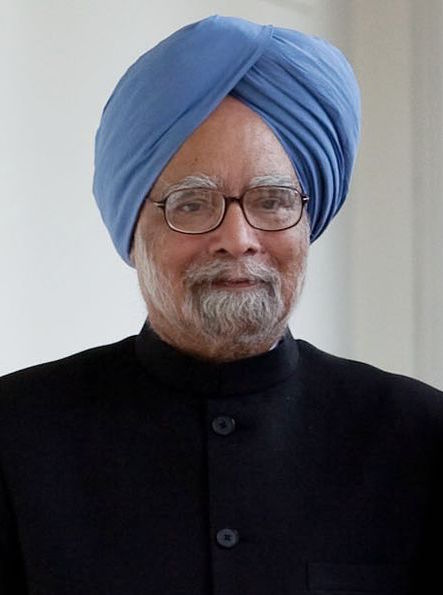
- Date formed: 22 May 2009
- Date dissolved: 26 May 2014

People and organisations
- Head of state: Pratibha Patil (until 25 July 2012); Pranab Mukherjee (from 25 July 2012)
- Head of government: Manmohan Singh
- Member parties: United Progressive Alliance: Indian National Congress; Nationalist Congress Party; Jammu and Kashmir National Conference; Rashtriya Lok Dal; Indian Union Muslim League; Former: All India Trinamool Congress (2009–2012); Dravida Munnetra Kazhagam (2009–2013)
- Status in legislature: Coalition
- Opposition party: Bharatiya Janata Party (NDA)
- Opposition leader: Sushma Swaraj (in Lok Sabha); Arun Jaitley (in Rajya Sabha)

History
- Election: 2009
- Outgoing election: 2014
- Legislature terms: 5 years, 4 days
- Predecessor: First Manmohan Singh ministry
- Successor: First Modi ministry

The Second Manmohan Singh ministry came into existence after the general election in 2009. The results of the election were announced on 16 May 2009 and led to the formation of the 15th Lok Sabha. Manmohan Singh took the oath as the 13th Prime Minister of India on 22 May 2009, followed by the oath-taking ceremonies of the Council of Ministers in two phases. They remained in office until next election. This ministry was the second-largest Union Council of Ministers in India after Third Vajpayee ministry until it was surpassed by the Third Modi ministry in 2024.

The new UPA government included 79 members, 78 members in the cabinet plus Prime Minister Manmohan Singh. The first 20 cabinet ministers including Manmohan Singh, swore in on 22 May 2009, while the other 59 cabinet members swore in on 28 May 2009.

== List of Council of Ministers ==
=== Cabinet Ministers ===
Portfolio	Minister	Took office	Left office	Party	Remarks
Prime Minister; Minister of Personnel, Public Grievances and Pensions; Department of Atomic Energy; Department of Space; Planning Commission; And also in-charge of all other important portfolios and policy issues not allocated to any Minister.	Manmohan Singh	22 May 2009	26 May 2014	INC	
Minister of Finance	Pranab Mukherjee	23 May 2009	26 June 2012	INC	Resigned.
Minister of Finance	Manmohan Singh	26 June 2012	31 July 2012	INC	Prime Minister was responsible. Additional charge following resignation of Pranab Mukherjee.
Minister of Finance	P. Chidambaram	31 July 2012	26 May 2014	INC	
Minister of Agriculture	Sharad Pawar	23 May 2009	26 May 2014	NCP	
Minister of Consumer Affairs, Food and Public Distribution	Sharad Pawar	23 May 2009	19 January 2011	NCP	
Minister of Consumer Affairs, Food and Public Distribution	K. V. Thomas	19 January 2011	26 May 2014	INC	Minister of State (I/C) was responsible.
Minister of Defence	A. K. Antony	23 May 2009	26 May 2014	INC	
Minister of Home Affairs	P. Chidambaram	23 May 2009	31 July 2012	INC	
Minister of Home Affairs	Sushilkumar Shinde	31 July 2012	26 May 2014	INC	
Minister of Railways	Mamata Banerjee	23 May 2009	19 May 2011	AITC	Resigned.
Minister of Railways	Manmohan Singh	19 May 2011	12 July 2011	INC	Prime Minister was responsible. Additional charge following resignation of Mamata Banerjee.
Minister of Railways	Dinesh Trivedi	12 July 2011	19 March 2012	AITC	Resigned.
Minister of Railways	Mukul Roy	20 March 2012	22 September 2012	AITC	Resigned.
Minister of Railways	C. P. Joshi	22 September 2012	28 October 2012	INC	Additional charge following resignation of Mukul Roy.
Minister of Railways	Pawan Kumar Bansal	28 October 2012	11 May 2013	INC	Resigned.
Minister of Railways	C. P. Joshi	11 May 2013	15 June 2013	INC	Additional charge following resignation of Pawan Kumar Bansal. Resigned.
Minister of Railways	Mallikarjun Kharge	17 June 2013	26 May 2014	INC	
Minister of External Affairs	S. M. Krishna	23 May 2009	27 October 2012	INC	
Minister of External Affairs	Salman Khurshid	28 October 2012	26 May 2014	INC	
Minister of Culture	Manmohan Singh	28 May 2009	19 January 2011	INC	Prime Minister was responsible.
Minister of Culture	Selja Kumari	19 January 2011	28 October 2012	INC	
Minister of Culture	Chandresh Kumari Katoch	28 October 2012	26 May 2014	INC	
Minister of Steel	Virbhadra Singh	28 May 2009	19 January 2011	INC	
Minister of Steel	Beni Prasad Verma	19 January 2011	12 July 2011	INC	Minister of State (I/C) was responsible.
Minister of Steel	Beni Prasad Verma	12 July 2011	26 May 2014	INC	
Minister of Heavy Industries and Public Enterprises	Vilasrao Deshmukh	28 May 2009	19 January 2011	INC	
Minister of Heavy Industries and Public Enterprises	Praful Patel	19 January 2011	26 May 2014	NCP	
Minister of Health and Family Welfare	Ghulam Nabi Azad	28 May 2009	26 May 2014	INC	
Minister of Power	Sushilkumar Shinde	28 May 2009	31 July 2012	INC	
Minister of Power	M. Veerappa Moily	31 July 2012	28 October 2012	INC	
Minister of Power	Jyotiraditya Scindia	28 October 2012	26 May 2014	INC	Minister of State (I/C) was responsible.
Minister of Law and Justice	M. Veerappa Moily	28 May 2009	12 July 2011	INC	
Minister of Law and Justice	Salman Khurshid	12 July 2011	28 October 2012	INC	
Minister of Law and Justice	Ashwani Kumar	28 October 2012	11 May 2013	INC	Resigned.
Minister of Law and Justice	Kapil Sibal	11 May 2013	26 May 2014	INC	Additional charge following resignation of Ashwani Kumar.
Minister of New and Renewable Energy	Farooq Abdullah	28 May 2009	26 May 2014	JKNC	
Minister of Urban Development	S. Jaipal Reddy	28 May 2009	19 January 2011	INC	
Minister of Urban Development	Kamal Nath	19 January 2011	26 May 2014	INC	
Minister of Road Transport and Highways	Kamal Nath	28 May 2009	19 January 2011	INC	
Minister of Road Transport and Highways	C. P. Joshi	19 January 2011	15 June 2013	INC	Resigned.
Minister of Road Transport and Highways	Oscar Fernandes	17 June 2013	26 May 2014	INC	
Minister of Overseas Indian Affairs	Vayalar Ravi	28 May 2009	26 May 2014	INC	
Minister of Water Resources	Meira Kumar	28 May 2009	31 May 2009	INC	Resigned.
Minister of Water Resources	Manmohan Singh	31 May 2009	14 June 2009	INC	Prime Minister was responsible. Additional charge following resignation of Meira Kumar.
Minister of Water Resources	Pawan Kumar Bansal	14 June 2009	19 January 2011	INC	
Minister of Water Resources	Salman Khurshid	19 January 2011	12 July 2011	INC	
Minister of Water Resources	Pawan Kumar Bansal	12 July 2011	28 October 2012	INC	
Minister of Water Resources	Harish Rawat	28 October 2012	1 February 2014	INC	Resigned.
Minister of Water Resources	Ghulam Nabi Azad	1 February 2014	26 May 2014	INC	Additional charge following resignation of Harish Rawat.
Minister of Textiles	Dayanidhi Maran	28 May 2009	12 July 2011	DMK	
Minister of Textiles	Anand Sharma	12 July 2011	17 June 2013	INC	
Minister of Textiles	Kavuri Samba Siva Rao	17 June 2013	3 April 2014	INC	Resigned.
Minister of Textiles	Anand Sharma	3 April 2014	26 May 2014	INC	Additional charge following resignation of Kavuri Samba Siva Rao.
Minister of Communications and Information Technology	A. Raja	28 May 2009	15 November 2010	DMK	Resigned.
Minister of Communications and Information Technology	Kapil Sibal	15 November 2010	26 May 2014	INC	Additional charge following resignation of A. Raja.
Minister of Petroleum and Natural Gas	Murli Deora	28 May 2009	19 January 2011	INC	
Minister of Petroleum and Natural Gas	S. Jaipal Reddy	19 January 2011	28 October 2012	INC	
Minister of Petroleum and Natural Gas	M. Veerappa Moily	28 October 2012	26 May 2014	INC	
Minister of Information and Broadcasting	Ambika Soni	28 May 2009	27 October 2012	INC	
Minister of Information and Broadcasting	Manish Tewari	28 October 2012	26 May 2014	INC	Minister of State (I/C) was responsible.
Minister of Labour and Employment	Mallikarjun Kharge	28 May 2009	17 June 2013	INC	
Minister of Labour and Employment	Sis Ram Ola	17 June 2013	15 December 2013	INC	Died in Office.
Minister of Labour and Employment	Oscar Fernandes	15 December 2013	26 May 2014	INC	Additional charge following demise of Sis Ram Ola.
Minister of Human Resource Development	Kapil Sibal	28 May 2009	28 October 2012	INC	
Minister of Human Resource Development	M. M. Pallam Raju	28 October 2012	26 May 2014	INC	
Minister of Mines	Bijoy Krishna Handique	28 May 2009	19 January 2011	INC	
Minister of Mines	Dinsha Patel	19 January 2011	28 October 2012	INC	Minister of State (I/C) was responsible.
Minister of Mines	Dinsha Patel	28 October 2012	26 May 2014	INC	
Minister of Development of North Eastern Region	Bijoy Krishna Handique	28 May 2009	12 July 2011	INC	
Minister of Development of North Eastern Region	Paban Singh Ghatowar	12 July 2011	26 May 2014	INC	Minister of State (I/C) was responsible.
Minister of Commerce and Industry	Anand Sharma	28 May 2009	26 May 2014	INC	
Minister of Rural Development	C. P. Joshi	28 May 2009	19 January 2011	INC	
Minister of Rural Development	Vilasrao Deshmukh	19 January 2011	12 July 2011	INC	
Minister of Rural Development	Jairam Ramesh	12 July 2011	26 May 2014	INC	
Minister of Panchayati Raj	C. P. Joshi	28 May 2009	19 January 2011	INC	
Minister of Panchayati Raj	Vilasrao Deshmukh	19 January 2011	12 July 2011	INC	
Minister of Panchayati Raj	Kishore Chandra Deo	12 July 2011	26 May 2014	INC	
Minister of Housing and Urban Poverty Alleviation	Selja Kumari	28 May 2009	28 October 2012	INC	
Minister of Housing and Urban Poverty Alleviation	Ajay Maken	28 October 2012	15 June 2013	INC	
Minister of Housing and Urban Poverty Alleviation	Girija Vyas	17 June 2013	26 May 2014	INC	
Minister of Tourism	Selja Kumari	28 May 2009	19 January 2011	INC	
Minister of Tourism	Subodh Kant Sahay	19 January 2011	27 October 2012	INC	
Minister of Tourism	K. Chiranjeevi	28 October 2012	26 May 2014	INC	Minister of State (I/C) was responsible.
Minister of Food Processing Industries	Subodh Kant Sahay	28 May 2009	19 January 2011	INC	
Minister of Food Processing Industries	Sharad Pawar	19 January 2011	26 May 2014	NCP	
Minister of Youth Affairs and Sports	M. S. Gill	28 May 2009	19 January 2011	INC	
Minister of Youth Affairs and Sports	Ajay Maken	19 January 2011	28 October 2012	INC	Minister of State (I/C) was responsible.
Minister of Youth Affairs and Sports	Jitendra Singh	28 October 2012	26 May 2014	INC	Minister of State (I/C) was responsible.
Minister of Shipping	G. K. Vasan	28 May 2009	26 May 2014	INC	
Minister of Parliamentary Affairs	Pawan Kumar Bansal	28 May 2009	28 October 2012	INC	
Minister of Parliamentary Affairs	Kamal Nath	28 October 2012	26 May 2014	INC	
Minister of Social Justice and Empowerment	Mukul Wasnik	28 May 2009	27 October 2012	INC	
Minister of Social Justice and Empowerment	Selja Kumari	28 October 2012	28 January 2014	INC	Resigned.
Minister of Social Justice and Empowerment	Mallikarjun Kharge	28 January 2014	26 May 2014	INC	Additional charge following resignation of Selja Kumari.
Minister of Tribal Affairs	Kantilal Bhuria	28 May 2009	12 July 2011	INC	
Minister of Tribal Affairs	Kishore Chandra Deo	12 July 2011	26 May 2014	INC	
Minister of Chemicals and Fertilizers	M. K. Alagiri	28 May 2009	20 March 2013	DMK	Resigned.
Minister of Chemicals and Fertilizers	Srikant Kumar Jena	20 March 2013	26 May 2014	INC	Minister of State (I/C) was responsible.
Minister of Civil Aviation	Praful Patel	28 May 2009	19 January 2011	NCP	Minister of State (I/C) was responsible.
Minister of Civil Aviation	Vayalar Ravi	19 January 2011	18 December 2011	INC	
Minister of Civil Aviation	Ajit Singh	18 December 2011	26 May 2014	RLD	
Minister of Science and Technology; Minister of Earth Sciences	Prithviraj Chavan	28 May 2009	10 November 2010	INC	Minister of State (I/C) was responsible. Resigned.
Minister of Science and Technology; Minister of Earth Sciences	Kapil Sibal	10 November 2010	19 January 2011	INC	Additional charge following resignation of Prithviraj Chavan.
Minister of Science and Technology; Minister of Earth Sciences	Pawan Kumar Bansal	19 January 2011	12 July 2011	INC	
Minister of Science and Technology; Minister of Earth Sciences	Vilasrao Deshmukh	12 July 2011	10 August 2012	INC	
Minister of Science and Technology; Minister of Earth Sciences	Vayalar Ravi	10 August 2012	28 October 2012	INC	Additional charge during period of indisposition of Vilasrao Deshmukh.
Minister of Science and Technology; Minister of Earth Sciences	S. Jaipal Reddy	28 October 2012	26 May 2014	INC	
Minister of Coal	Shriprakash Jaiswal	28 May 2009	19 January 2011	INC	Minister of State (I/C) was responsible.
Minister of Coal	Shriprakash Jaiswal	19 January 2011	26 May 2014	INC	
Minister of Statistics and Programme Implementation	Shriprakash Jaiswal	28 May 2009	19 January 2011	INC	Minister of State (I/C) was responsible.
Minister of Statistics and Programme Implementation	M. S. Gill	19 January 2011	12 July 2011	INC	
Minister of Statistics and Programme Implementation	Srikant Kumar Jena	12 July 2011	26 May 2014	INC	Minister of State (I/C) was responsible.
Minister of Corporate Affairs	Salman Khurshid	28 May 2009	19 January 2011	INC	Minister of State (I/C) was responsible.
Minister of Corporate Affairs	Murli Deora	19 January 2011	12 July 2011	INC	
Minister of Corporate Affairs	M. Veerappa Moily	12 July 2011	28 October 2012	INC	
Minister of Corporate Affairs	Sachin Pilot	28 October 2012	26 May 2014	INC	Minister of State (I/C) was responsible.
Minister of Minority Affairs	Salman Khurshid	28 May 2009	19 January 2011	INC	Minister of State (I/C) was responsible.
Minister of Minority Affairs	Salman Khurshid	19 January 2011	28 October 2012	INC	
Minister of Minority Affairs	K. Rahman Khan	28 October 2012	26 May 2014	INC	
Minister of Micro, Small and Medium Enterprises	Dinsha Patel	28 May 2009	19 January 2011	INC	Minister of State (I/C) was responsible.
Minister of Micro, Small and Medium Enterprises	Virbhadra Singh	19 January 2011	26 June 2012	INC	Resigned.
Minister of Micro, Small and Medium Enterprises	Vilasrao Deshmukh	26 June 2012	10 August 2012	INC	Additional charge following resignation of Virbhadra Singh.
Minister of Micro, Small and Medium Enterprises	Vayalar Ravi	10 August 2012	28 October 2012	INC	Additional charge during period of indisposition of Vilasrao Deshmukh.
Minister of Micro, Small and Medium Enterprises	K. H. Muniyappa	28 October 2012	26 May 2014	INC	Minister of State (I/C) was responsible.
Minister of Environment and Forests	Jairam Ramesh	28 May 2009	12 July 2011	INC	Minister of State (I/C) was responsible.
Minister of Environment and Forests	Jayanthi Natarajan	12 July 2011	21 December 2013	INC	Minister of State (I/C) was responsible. Resigned.
Minister of Environment and Forests	M. Veerappa Moily	21 December 2013	26 May 2014	INC	Additional charge following resignation of Jayanthi Natarajan.
Minister of Drinking Water and Sanitation	Gurudas Kamat	12 July 2011	13 July 2011	INC	Minister of State (I/C) was responsible. Resigned.
Minister of Drinking Water and Sanitation	Jairam Ramesh	13 July 2011	28 October 2012	INC	Additional charge following resignation of Gurudas Kamat.
Minister of Drinking Water and Sanitation	Bharatsinh Solanki	28 October 2012	26 May 2014	INC	Minister of State (I/C) was responsible.
Minister without portfolio	Vilasrao Deshmukh	10 August 2012	14 August 2012	INC	Died in Office.

=== Ministers of State (Independent Charge) ===
Portfolio	Minister	Took office	Left office	Party	Remarks
Minister of State (Independent Charge) of Women and Child Development	Krishna Tirath	28 May 2009	26 May 2014	INC	

=== Ministers of State ===
Portfolio	Minister	Took office	Left office	Party	Remarks
Minister of State in the Prime Minister's Office	Prithviraj Chavan	28 May 2009	10 November 2010	INC	Resigned.
Minister of State in the Prime Minister's Office	V. Narayanasamy	19 January 2011	26 May 2014	INC	
Minister of State in the Ministry of Personnel, Public Grievances and Pensions	Prithviraj Chavan	28 May 2009	10 November 2010	INC	Resigned.
Minister of State in the Ministry of Personnel, Public Grievances and Pensions	V. Narayanasamy	15 November 2010	26 May 2014	INC	
Minister of State in the Ministry of Parliamentary Affairs	Prithviraj Chavan	28 May 2009	10 November 2010	INC	Resigned.
Minister of State in the Ministry of Parliamentary Affairs	V. Narayanasamy	28 May 2009	12 July 2011	INC	
Minister of State in the Ministry of Parliamentary Affairs	Ashwani Kumar	19 January 2011	12 July 2011	INC	
Minister of State in the Ministry of Parliamentary Affairs	Harish Rawat	12 July 2011	28 October 2012	INC	
Minister of State in the Ministry of Parliamentary Affairs	Rajeev Shukla	12 July 2011	26 May 2014	INC	
Minister of State in the Ministry of Parliamentary Affairs	Paban Singh Ghatowar	20 July 2011	28 October 2012	INC	
Minister of State in the Ministry of Chemicals and Fertilizers	Srikant Kumar Jena	28 May 2009	21 March 2013	INC	
Minister of State in the Ministry of Railways	E. Ahamed	28 May 2009	19 January 2011	IUML	
Minister of State in the Ministry of Railways	K. H. Muniyappa	28 May 2009	28 October 2012	INC	
Minister of State in the Ministry of Railways	Bharatsinh Solanki	19 January 2011	28 October 2012	INC	
Minister of State in the Ministry of Railways	Mukul Roy	19 May 2011	12 July 2011	AITC	
Minister of State in the Ministry of Railways	Kotla Jayasurya Prakasha Reddy	28 October 2012	26 May 2014	INC	
Minister of State in the Ministry of Railways	Adhir Ranjan Chowdhury	28 October 2012	26 May 2014	INC	
Minister of State in the Ministry of Home Affairs	Mullappally Ramachandran	28 May 2009	26 May 2014	INC	
Minister of State in the Ministry of Home Affairs	Ajay Maken	28 May 2009	19 January 2011	INC	
Minister of State in the Ministry of Home Affairs	Gurudas Kamat	19 January 2011	12 July 2011	INC	
Minister of State in the Ministry of Home Affairs	Jitendra Singh	12 July 2011	28 October 2012	INC	
Minister of State in the Ministry of Home Affairs	R.P.N. Singh	28 October 2012	26 May 2014	INC	
Minister of State in the Ministry of Planning	V. Narayanasamy	28 May 2009	19 January 2011	INC	
Minister of State in the Ministry of Planning	Ashwani Kumar	19 January 2011	28 October 2012	INC	
Minister of State in the Ministry of Planning	Rajeev Shukla	28 October 2012	26 May 2014	INC	
Minister of State in the Ministry of Commerce and Industry	Jyotiraditya Scindia	28 May 2009	28 October 2012	INC	
Minister of State in the Ministry of Commerce and Industry	Daggubati Purandeswari	28 October 2012	11 March 2014	INC	Resigned.
Minister of State in the Ministry of Commerce and Industry	S. Jagathrakshakan	2 November 2012	20 March 2013	DMK	Resigned.
Minister of State in the Ministry of Commerce and Industry	E. M. Sudarsana Natchiappan	17 June 2013	26 May 2014	INC	
Minister of State in the Ministry of Human Resource Development	Daggubati Purandeswari	28 May 2009	28 October 2012	INC	
Minister of State in the Ministry of Human Resource Development	E. Ahamed	12 July 2011	28 October 2012	IUML	
Minister of State in the Ministry of Human Resource Development	Jitin Prasada	28 October 2012	26 May 2014	INC	
Minister of State in the Ministry of Human Resource Development	Shashi Tharoor	28 October 2012	26 May 2014	INC	
Minister of State in the Ministry of Textiles	Panabaka Lakshmi	28 May 2009	31 October 2012	INC	
Minister of State in the Ministry of Textiles	Panabaka Lakshmi	5 March 2013	26 May 2014	INC	
Minister of State in the Ministry of Finance	Namo Narain Meena	28 May 2009	26 May 2014	INC	
Minister of State in the Ministry of Finance	S. S. Palanimanickam	28 May 2009	20 March 2013	DMK	Resigned.
Minister of State in the Ministry of Finance	Jesudasu Seelam	17 June 2013	26 May 2014	INC	
Minister of State in the Ministry of Defence	M. M. Pallam Raju	28 May 2009	28 October 2012	INC	
Minister of State in the Ministry of Defence	Jitendra Singh	28 October 2012	26 May 2014	INC	
Minister of State in the Ministry of Defence	Lalchand Kataria	28 October 2012	30 October 2012	INC	
Minister of State in the Ministry of Urban Development	Saugata Roy	28 May 2009	22 September 2012	AITC	Resigned.
Minister of State in the Ministry of Urban Development	Deepa Dasmunsi	28 October 2012	26 May 2014	INC	
Minister of State in the Ministry of Petroleum and Natural Gas	Jitin Prasada	28 May 2009	19 January 2011	INC	
Minister of State in the Ministry of Petroleum and Natural Gas	R.P.N. Singh	19 January 2011	28 October 2012	INC	
Minister of State in the Ministry of Petroleum and Natural Gas	Panabaka Lakshmi	30 October 2012	26 May 2014	INC	
Minister of State in the Ministry of Steel	Sai Prathap Annayyagari	28 May 2009	19 January 2011	INC	
Minister of State in the Ministry of Communications and Information Technology	Gurudas Kamat	28 May 2009	19 January 2011	INC	
Minister of State in the Ministry of Communications and Information Technology	Sachin Pilot	28 May 2009	28 October 2012	INC	
Minister of State in the Ministry of Communications and Information Technology	Gurudas Kamat	21 January 2011	12 July 2011	INC	
Minister of State in the Ministry of Communications and Information Technology	Milind Deora	12 July 2011	26 May 2014	INC	
Minister of State in the Ministry of Communications and Information Technology	Killi Krupa Rani	28 October 2012	26 May 2014	INC	
Minister of State in the Ministry of Labour and Employment	Harish Rawat	28 May 2009	19 January 2011	INC	
Minister of State in the Ministry of Labour and Employment	Kodikunnil Suresh	28 October 2012	26 May 2014	INC	
Minister of State in the Ministry of Agriculture	K. V. Thomas	28 May 2009	19 January 2011	INC	
Minister of State in the Ministry of Agriculture	Harish Rawat	19 January 2011	28 October 2012	INC	
Minister of State in the Ministry of Agriculture	Arun Yadav	19 January 2011	12 July 2011	INC	
Minister of State in the Ministry of Agriculture	Charan Das Mahant	12 July 2011	26 May 2014	INC	
Minister of State in the Ministry of Agriculture	Tariq Anwar	28 October 2012	26 May 2014	NCP	
Minister of State in the Ministry of Consumer Affairs, Food and Public Distribution	K. V. Thomas	28 May 2009	19 January 2011	INC	
Minister of State in the Ministry of Power	Bharatsinh Solanki	28 May 2009	19 January 2011	INC	
Minister of State in the Ministry of Power	K. C. Venugopal	19 January 2011	28 October 2012	INC	
Minister of State in the Ministry of Road Transport and Highways	Mahadeo Singh Khandela	28 May 2009	19 January 2011	INC	
Minister of State in the Ministry of Road Transport and Highways	R.P.N. Singh	28 May 2009	19 January 2011	INC	
Minister of State in the Ministry of Road Transport and Highways	Jitin Prasada	19 January 2011	28 October 2012	INC	
Minister of State in the Ministry of Road Transport and Highways	Tushar Amarsinh Chaudhary	19 January 2011	26 May 2014	INC	
Minister of State in the Ministry of Road Transport and Highways	Sarvey Sathyanarayana	28 October 2012	26 May 2014	INC	
Minister of State in the Ministry of Health and Family Welfare	Dinesh Trivedi	28 May 2009	12 July 2011	AITC	
Minister of State in the Ministry of Health and Family Welfare	S. Gandhiselvan	28 May 2009	20 March 2013	DMK	Resigned.
Minister of State in the Ministry of Health and Family Welfare	Sudip Bandyopadhyay	12 July 2011	22 September 2012	AITC	Resigned.
Minister of State in the Ministry of Health and Family Welfare	Abu Hasem Khan Choudhury	28 October 2012	26 May 2014	INC	
Minister of State in the Ministry of Health and Family Welfare	Santosh Chowdhary	17 June 2013	26 May 2014	INC	
Minister of State in the Ministry of Rural Development	Sisir Adhikari	28 May 2009	22 September 2012	AITC	Resigned.
Minister of State in the Ministry of Rural Development	Pradeep Jain Aditya	28 May 2009	26 May 2014	INC	
Minister of State in the Ministry of Rural Development	Agatha Sangma	28 May 2009	27 October 2012	NCP	
Minister of State in the Ministry of Rural Development	Lalchand Kataria	30 October 2012	26 May 2014	INC	
Minister of State in the Ministry of Tourism	Sultan Ahmed	28 May 2009	22 September 2012	AITC	Resigned.
Minister of State in the Ministry of Shipping	Mukul Roy	28 May 2009	20 March 2012	AITC	
Minister of State in the Ministry of Shipping	Milind Deora	30 October 2012	26 May 2014	INC	
Minister of State in the Ministry of Information and Broadcasting	Choudhury Mohan Jatua	28 May 2009	22 September 2012	AITC	Resigned.
Minister of State in the Ministry of Information and Broadcasting	S. Jagathrakshakan	28 May 2009	28 October 2012	DMK	
Minister of State in the Ministry of Social Justice and Empowerment	D. Napoleon	28 May 2009	20 March 2013	DMK	Resigned.
Minister of State in the Ministry of Social Justice and Empowerment	Porika Balram Naik	28 October 2012	26 May 2014	INC	
Minister of State in the Ministry of Social Justice and Empowerment	Manikrao Hodlya Gavit	17 June 2013	26 May 2014	INC	
Minister of State in the Ministry of External Affairs	Preneet Kaur	28 May 2009	26 May 2014	INC	
Minister of State in the Ministry of External Affairs	Shashi Tharoor	28 May 2009	18 April 2010	INC	Resigned.
Minister of State in the Ministry of External Affairs	E. Ahamed	19 January 2011	26 May 2014	IUML	
Minister of State in the Ministry of Tribal Affairs	Tushar Amarsinh Chaudhary	28 May 2009	19 January 2011	INC	
Minister of State in the Ministry of Tribal Affairs	Mahadeo Singh Khandela	19 January 2011	27 October 2012	INC	
Minister of State in the Ministry of Tribal Affairs	Ranee Narah	28 October 2012	26 May 2014	INC	
Minister of State in the Ministry of Youth Affairs and Sports	Arun Yadav	28 May 2009	14 June 2009	INC	
Minister of State in the Ministry of Youth Affairs and Sports	Pratik Prakashbapu Patil	14 June 2009	19 January 2011	INC	
Minister of State in the Ministry of Heavy Industries and Public Enterprises	Pratik Prakashbapu Patil	28 May 2009	14 June 2009	INC	
Minister of State in the Ministry of Heavy Industries and Public Enterprises	Arun Yadav	14 June 2009	19 January 2011	INC	
Minister of State in the Ministry of Heavy Industries and Public Enterprises	Sai Prathap Annayyagari	19 January 2011	12 July 2011	INC	
Minister of State in the Ministry of Water Resources	Vincent Pala	28 May 2009	27 October 2012	INC	
Minister of State in the Ministry of Food Processing Industries	Harish Rawat	19 January 2011	28 October 2012	INC	
Minister of State in the Ministry of Food Processing Industries	Arun Yadav	19 January 2011	12 July 2011	INC	
Minister of State in the Ministry of Food Processing Industries	Charan Das Mahant	12 July 2011	26 May 2014	INC	
Minister of State in the Ministry of Food Processing Industries	Tariq Anwar	28 October 2012	26 May 2014	NCP	
Minister of State in the Ministry of Coal	Pratik Prakashbapu Patil	19 January 2011	26 May 2014	INC	
Minister of State in the Ministry of Corporate Affairs	R.P.N. Singh	19 January 2011	28 October 2012	INC	
Minister of State in the Ministry of Minority Affairs	Vincent Pala	19 January 2011	27 October 2012	INC	
Minister of State in the Ministry of Minority Affairs	Ninong Ering	28 October 2012	26 May 2014	INC	
Minister of State in the Ministry of Science and Technology; Minister of State in the Ministry of Earth Sciences	Ashwani Kumar	19 January 2011	28 October 2012	INC	
Minister of State in the Ministry of New and Renewable Energy	S. Jagathrakshakan	28 October 2012	2 November 2012	DMK	
Minister of State in the Ministry of Civil Aviation	K. C. Venugopal	28 October 2012	26 May 2014	INC	

== Demographics of the Ministers ==
Representation of cabinet ministers by party
1. Indian National Congress (92.2%)
2. Nationalist Congress Party (3.90%)
3. Jammu and Kashmir National Conference (1.30%)
4. Rashtriya Lok Dal (1.30%)
5. Indian Union Muslim League (1.30%)

=== Parties ===
Party	Cabinet	MoS(I/C)	MoS	Total
INC	24 (Note: Including Prime Minister)	11	30	65
NCP	2	—N/a	1	3
JKNC	1	—N/a	—N/a	1
RLD	1	—N/a	—N/a	1
IUML	—N/a	—N/a	1	1
Total	28	11	32	71

=== States ===
State	Cabinet Ministers	Ministers of State (I/C)	Ministers of State	Total number of ministers	Name of ministers
Andhra Pradesh	4	1	6	10	S. Jaipal Reddy; Kishore Chandra Deo; Jairam Ramesh; M. M. Pallam Raju; Chiranjeevi; Panabaka Lakshmi; Kotla Jayasurya Prakasha Reddy; Sarvey Sathyanarayana; Balram Naik; Killi Krupa Rani; Jesudasu Seelam
Arunachal Pradesh	—	—	1	1	Ninong Ering
Assam	1	1	1	3	Manmohan Singh (Prime Minister); Paban Singh Ghatowar; Ranee Narah
Chhattisgarh	—	—	1	1	Charan Das Mahant
Gujarat	1	1	1	3	Dinsha Patel; Bharatsinh Solanki; Tushar Amarsinh Chaudhary
Jammu and Kashmir	2	—	—	2	Ghulam Nabi Azad; Farooq Abdullah
Karnataka	4	1	2	7	M. Veerappa Moily; Mallikarjun Kharge; Oscar Fernandes; K. Rahman Khan; K. H. Muniyappa; E. Ahamed; Mullappally Ramachandran
Kerala	2	1	3	6	A. K. Antony; Vayalar Ravi; K. V. Thomas; Shashi Tharoor; K. C. Venugopal; Kodikunnil Suresh
Madhya Pradesh	1	1	—	2	Kamal Nath; Jyotiraditya Scindia
Maharashtra	3	—	5	8	Sharad Pawar; Sushilkumar Shinde; Praful Patel; Manikrao Hodlya Gavit; Pratik Prakashbapu Patil; Milind Deora; Rajeev Shukla; Tariq Anwar
Odisha	—	1	—	1	Srikant Kumar Jena
Punjab	—	1	2	3	Manish Tewari; Santosh Chowdhary; Preneet Kaur
Rajasthan	3	2	2	7	Anand Sharma; Girija Vyas; Chandresh Kumari Katoch; Sachin Pilot; Jitendra Singh; Namo Narain Meena; Lalchand Kataria
Tamil Nadu	2	—	1	3	P. Chidambaram; G. K. Vasan; E. M. Sudarsana Natchiappan
Uttar Pradesh	4	—	3	7	Ajit Singh; Shriprakash Jaiswal; Salman Khurshid; Beni Prasad Verma; Jitin Prasada; R.P.N. Singh; Pradeep Jain Aditya
West Bengal	—	—	3	3	Adhir Ranjan Chowdhury; Abu Hasem Khan Choudhury; Deepa Dasmunsi
Delhi	1	1	—	2	Kapil Sibal; Krishna Tirath
Puducherry	—	—	1	1	V. Narayanasamy
Total	28	11	32	71	

== Demographics of the former ministers ==
=== Parties ===
Party	Cabinet Ministers	Ministers of State (I/C)	Ministers of State	Total numbers of ministers
INC	20	3	5	28
AITC	3	0	5	8
DMK	3	0	4	7
NCP	0	0	1	1
Total	26	3	15	44

=== States ===
State	Cabinet Ministers	Ministers of State (I/C)	Ministers of State	Total number of ministers	Name of ministers
Andhra Pradesh	1	—	2	3	Kavuri Samba Siva Rao; Daggubati Purandeswari; Sai Prathap Annayyagari
Assam	1	—	—	1	Bijoy Krishna Handique
Bihar	1	—	—	1	Meira Kumar
Haryana	1	—	—	1	Selja Kumari
Himachal Pradesh	1	—	—	1	Virbhadra Singh
Jharkhand	1	—	—	1	Subodh Kant Sahay
Karnataka	1	—	—	1	S. M. Krishna
Madhya Pradesh	1	—	1	2	Kantilal Bhuria; Arun Yadav
Maharashtra	3	2	—	5	Murli Deora; Vilasrao Deshmukh; Mukul Wasnik; Prithviraj Chavan; Gurudas Kamat
Meghalaya	—	—	2	2	Vincent Pala; Agatha Sangma
Punjab	3	—	—	3	Ambika Soni; M. S. Gill; Ashwani Kumar
Rajasthan	2	—	1	3	C. P. Joshi; Sis Ram Ola; Mahadeo Singh Khandela
Tamil Nadu	3	1	4	8	Dayanidhi Maran; A. Raja; M. K. Alagiri; Jayanthi Natarajan; S. S. Palanimanickam; Napoleon; S. Jagathrakshakan; S. Gandhiselvan
Uttarakhand	1	—	—	1	Harish Rawat
West Bengal	4	—	5	9	Pranab Mukherjee; Mamata Banerjee; Dinesh Trivedi; Mukul Roy; Saugata Roy; Sisir Adhikari; Sultan Ahmed; Choudhury Mohan Jatua; Sudip Bandyopadhyay
Chandigarh	1	—	—	1	Pawan Kumar Bansal
Delhi	1	—	—	1	Ajay Maken
Total	26	3	15	44	

== Entities in the Prime Minister's Office ==
- From October 2011, the post of Secretary under Prime Ministers office has been eliminated as per policy.

Office of the Prime Minister of India
Name	Designation	Rank
T. K. A. Nair	Advisor to PM	Minister of State Rank
Pulok Chatterji	Principal Secretary	
Shivshankar Menon	National Security Adviser	Minister of State Rank
Pankaj Pachauri	Communications Adviser	
R. Ramanujam	Secretary	
Vikram Misri; Shatrughna Singh; Vini Mahajan; L. K. Atheeq	Joint Secretary	
Munu Mahawar; Dheeraj Gupta; Sharmila Joseph; Pallavi Jain; Arindam Bagchi; Rajeev Topno; Sanjay Lohiya; Krishan Kumar; Binoy Job	Director	
Indu Chaturvedi; Jaideep Sarkar; K Muthukumar	PMO Personal Staff	
Gourangalal Das; Sanjukta Ray; Mehar Jhamb	Deputy Secretary	
J P Arya	Joint Director	
P K Bali; K Salil Kumar; R Mythili	Under Secretary	
Sources: Office of the PM of India

== Approval Ratings ==
The approval ratings for the government from 2008 to 2013, according to Gallup polling, are given below.

Year	Approve	Disapprove
2008	53%	33%
2009	55%	35%
2010	57%	33%
2011	46%	47%
2012	39%	47%
2013	30%	48%

== See also ==
- United Progressive Alliance
- 2012 Indian cabinet reshuffle
- List of members of the 15th Lok Sabha
- Union Council of Ministers
