= Judges Assets Bill =

Judges Assets Bill is a proposed legislation in India which would make disclosure of personal assets of judges mandatory in India. The Bill titled The Judges Declaration of Assets and Liabilities Bill, 2009 was attempted to be introduced in Rajya Sabha by Justice Minister M. Veerappa Moily on 3 August 2009. However, it was postponed due to opposition from both Left and Right about Clause 6 of the bill which states that High Court and Supreme Court judges would declare their assets but the same would not be made public.

The bill would mandate Chief Justice of India and other judges of the Supreme Court and High court and their dependents declare their assets. The bill was approved by the cabinet on 25 July 2009.
