= Arvind Sawant =

Indian politician

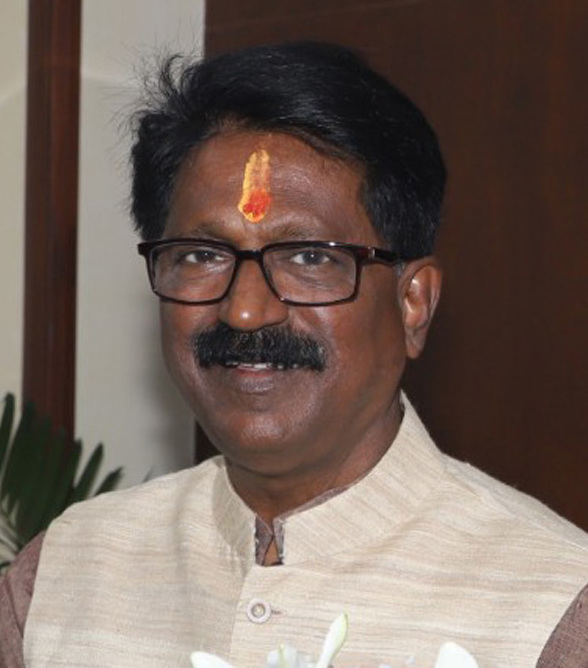
- Sawant in 2014

Member of Parliament, Lok Sabha
- Incumbent
- Assumed office 16 May 2014
- Preceded by: Milind Deora
- Constituency: Mumbai South, Maharashtra

Leader of Shiv Sena (UBT) in Lok Sabha
- Incumbent
- Assumed office 4 June 2024

Union Minister of Heavy Industries and Public Enterprises
- In office 30 May 2019 – 11 November 2019
- Prime Minister: Narendra Modi
- Preceded by: Anant Geete
- Succeeded by: Prakash Javadekar

Member of Maharashtra Legislative Council
- In office 2002–2010
- Constituency: Brihanmumbai Municipal Corporation
- In office 1996–2002
- Constituency: Nominated

Personal details
- Born: Arvind Ganpat Sawant; 31 December 1951 (age 74) Sindhudurg, Bombay State, India
- Party: Shiv Sena (UBT) (since 2022)
- Other political affiliations: Shiv Sena (until 2022)
- Spouse: Anuya Sawant (m. 1982)
- Children: 2
- Website: Arvind Sawant

Arvind Ganpat Sawant (born 31 December 1951) is an Indian politician from the Shiv Sena (UBT) party who has served as Minister of Heavy Industries and Public Enterprises from 30 May 2019 to 11 November 2019. He is a Member of Lok Sabha since 2014. On 11 November 2019, Sawant quit as union minister in the Modi government due to ongoing power tussle between Bharatiya Janata Party and Shiv Sena in the follow up to 2019 Maharashtra Legislative Assembly election.

== Early life ==
Sawant was born on 31 December 1951 to Ganpat Pandurag and Aashalata Ganpat Sawant. He has received a B. Sc. degree from Bhavan's College of Mumbai. His family is from a middle-class background. Prior to joining politics, he worked as an engineer with the state-owned Mahanagar Telephone Nigam Limited, the largest landline provider in Mumbai and Delhi.

== Political career ==
=== Early politics ===
In 1968, Sawant started his political career with Shiv Sena as a 'gat pramukh', the lowest rank of the party hierarchy. During this time, he worked as a polling agent and also participated in various protests which were organized by the party. He also joined Sthaniya Lokadhikar Samiti, which worked to demand jobs for the local people.

=== Electoral politics ===
In 1995, Sawant took voluntary retirement and joined Shiv Sena. In 1996, he was elected to the Maharashtra Legislative Council. In the council, he raised issues pertaining to slum development, demanded prominence for Marathi language, and demanded housing for the mill workers. Although he managed to get elected to the council twice, he lost the election during his third attempt as the party was short of numbers in the Mumbai Municipal Corporation. In 2010, he was made the deputy leader and the official spokesperson of the party. During his tenure as the party spokesperson, he defended the party in news channel debates at a time when the party was criticised for its policy on migrants to Mumbai.

In the 2014 Indian general election, the party announced that Sawant would contest from the Mumbai South constituency. He was considered a "weak candidate" by India Today compared to his main competitor, Milind Deora of the Indian National Congress party. Sawant defeated Deora by a margin of approximately 120,000 votes. His attendance record in the Lok Sabha was more than 90%. He was also one of the members who presented the highest number of private-member bills. He served as a member of the Estimates Committee, Standing committee on Petroleum and Natural Gas, Consultative Committee, Ministry of Communications and Information Technology, and Committee on Estimates.

In the 2019 Indian general election, Sawant defeated Deora by more than 100,000 votes. Subsequently, he was made the minister of Heavy Industries and Public Enterprises. On 11 November 2019 he had to resign from the Modi government cabinet because of power tussle between Shivsena and BJP.

== Personal life ==
On 25 May 1982, Sawant married Anuya Arvind Sawant. They have one son and one daughter.

Lok Sabha
Preceded by Milind Deora	Member of Parliament for Mumbai South; 16 May 2014 – Present	Incumbent
Political offices
Preceded by Anant Geete	Minister of Heavy Industries and Public Enterprises; 30 May 2019 – 11 November 2019	Succeeded by Prakash Javadekar
