= Rajda =

Rajda is an Indian surname. Notable people with the surname include:

- Kinga Rajda (born 2000), Polish female ski jumper
- Mulraj Rajda (1931–2012), Indian writer, actor, and director
- Sameer Rajda (born 1963), Indian actor
- Ratansingh Rajda, Indian politician
