= Mumbai South Lok Sabha constituency =

Constituency of the Indian parliament in Maharashtra

Coordinates: 18.96°N 72.83°E

Mumbai South MH-31
- Lok Sabha constituency
- Interactive Map Outlining Mumbai South Lok Sabha constituency

Constituency details
- Country: India
- Region: Western India
- State: Maharashtra
- Assembly constituencies: Worli; Shivadi; Byculla; Malabar Hill; Mumbadevi; Colaba
- Established: 1952–present
- Total electors: 15,36,168 (2024)
- Reservation: None

Member of Parliament
- 18th Lok Sabha
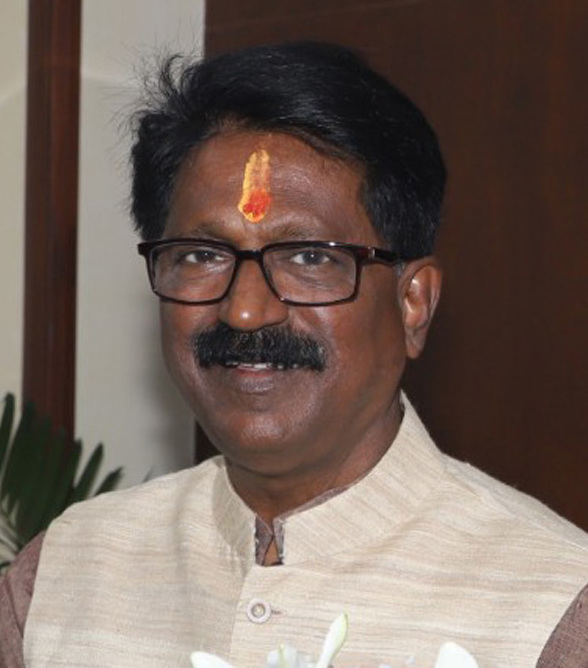
- Incumbent Arvind Ganpat Sawant
- Party: SS(UBT)
- Alliance: INDIA
- Elected year: 2024
- Preceded by: Milind Deora

Mumbai South Lok Sabha constituency is one of the 48 Lok Sabha (parliamentary) constituencies of Maharashtra state in western India.

== Assembly segments ==
Presently, after the implementation of the Presidential notification on delimitation on 19 February 2008, Mumbai South Lok Sabha constituency comprises six Vidhan Sabha (legislative assembly) segments. These segments are:

#	Name	District	Member	Party	Leading (2024 Lok Sabha)
182	Worli	Mumbai City	Aditya Thackeray	SS(UBT)	SS(UBT)
183	Shivadi	Mumbai City	Ajay Choudhari	SS(UBT)	SS(UBT)
184	Byculla	Mumbai City	Manoj Jamsutkar	SS(UBT)	SS(UBT)
185	Malabar Hill	Mumbai City	Mangal Prabhat Lodha	BJP	SHS
186	Mumbadevi	Mumbai City	Amin Patel	INC	SS(UBT)
187	Colaba	Mumbai City	Rahul Narvekar	BJP	SHS

== Members of Parliament ==
Year	Member	Party
1952	S. K. Patil	Indian National Congress
1957	S. K. Patil	Indian National Congress
1962	S. K. Patil	Indian National Congress
1967	George Fernandes	Samyukta Socialist Party
1971	Narain Nirula Kailas	Indian National Congress
1977	Ratansingh Rajda	Janata Party
1980	Ratansingh Rajda	Janata Party
1984	Murli Deora	Indian National Congress
1989	Murli Deora	Indian National Congress
1991	Murli Deora	Indian National Congress
1996	Jayawantiben Mehta	Bharatiya Janata Party
1998	Murli Deora	Indian National Congress
1999	Jayawantiben Mehta	Bharatiya Janata Party
2004	Milind Deora	Indian National Congress
2009	Milind Deora	Indian National Congress
2014	Arvind Sawant	Shiv Sena
2019	Arvind Sawant	Shiv Sena
2024	Arvind Sawant	Shiv Sena (UBT)

== Election results ==
=== General elections 1951 ===
1951 Indian general election: Bombay City South
Party	Candidate	Votes	%	±%
INC	Sadashiv Kanoji Patil	96,302	49.61	
Socialist	Purshottamdas Trikamdas	61,215	31.53	
Independent	Chunilal Bhaichand Mehta	33,387	17.20	
Majority		35,087	18.08	
Turnout		194,136	52.39	
INC win (new seat)				

=== General elections 1957 ===
1957 Indian general election: Bombay City South
Party	Candidate	Votes	%	±%
INC	Sadashiv Kanoji Patil	140,365	62.11	▲12.50
ABJS	Anant Ganpat Mulgaokar	80,449	35.60	N/A
Independent	Krishnarao Raghavendrarao Bengeri	5,186	2.29	N/A
Majority		59,916	26.51	▲8.43
Turnout		226,000	63.73	▲11.34
INC hold		Swing	▲12.50	

=== General elections 1962 ===
1962 Indian general election: Bombay City South
Party	Candidate	Votes	%	±%
INC	Sadashiv Kanoji Patil	154,570	64.13	▲2.01
Independent	Lalji Moreshwar Pendse	53,943	22.38	N/A
Majority		1,00,627	41.75	▲15.24
Turnout		2,41,028	58.41	▼5.32
INC hold		Swing	▲2.01	

=== General elections 1967 ===
1967 Indian general election: Bombay South
Party	Candidate	Votes	%	±%
SSP	George Fernandes	147,841	48.50	New
INC	Sadashiv Kanoji Patil	1,18,407	38.85	▼25.28
ABJS	C. S. Agrawal	20,501	6.73	N/A
PSP	M. Kotwal	11,661	3.83	N/A
Majority		29,434	9.65	▼32.10
Turnout		3,04,813	67.42	▲9.01
SSP gain from INC		Swing	▲48.50	

=== General elections 1971 ===
1971 Indian general election: Bombay South
Party	Candidate	Votes	%	±%
INC	Kailas Narain Narula Shivnarain	138,408	47.10	▲8.25
Independent	Naval Hormasji Tata	1,18,659	40.38	N/A
SSP	George Fernandes	30,377	10.34	▼38.16
Majority		19,749	6.72	▼2.93
Turnout		2,93,850	62.87	▼4.55
INC gain from SSP		Swing	▲8.25	

=== General elections 1977 ===
1977 Indian general election: Bombay South
Party	Candidate	Votes	%	±%
JP	Ratansinh Rajda	226,893	56.76	New
INC	Ramanlal Chhotalal Ankleshwaria	1,62,499	40.65	▼6.45
Majority		64,394	16.11	▲9.39
Turnout		3,99,772	59.22	▼3.65
JP gain from INC		Swing	▲56.76	

=== General elections 1980 ===
1980 Indian general election: Bombay South
Party	Candidate	Votes	%	±%
JP	Ratansingh Rajda	161,557	50.21	▼5.55
INC(I)	Murli Deora	1,46,387	45.50	New
JP(S)	Nazir Hakeem	7,077	2.20	New
Majority		15,170	4.71	▼11.40
Turnout		3,21,734	47.66	▼11.56
JP hold		Swing	▼5.55	

=== General elections 1984 ===
1984 Indian general election: Bombay South
Party	Candidate	Votes	%	±%
INC	Murli Deora	200,152	60.18	▲14.68
BJP	Jayawantiben Mehta	94,874	28.52	N/A
JP	Ratansinh Rajda	29,196	8.78	▼41.43
Majority		1,05,278	31.66	▲26.95
Turnout		3,32,606	51.59	▲3.93
INC gain from JP		Swing	▲14.68	

=== General elections 1989 ===
Oct. 11, 1988: JANATA DAL formed following the Merger of Janata Party, Janata Party (Secular) Lok Dal, Indian National Congress (Urs) and Jan Morcha under the leadership of V.P.Singh.

1989 Indian general election: Bombay South
Party	Candidate	Votes	%	±%
INC	Murli Deora	178,986	45.78	−14.40
BJP	Premkumar Shankardutt Sharma	1,61,247	41.24	+12.72
JD	Ratansinh Gokuldas Rajda	31,442	8.04	N/A
Independent	Madhu Metta	11,243	2.88	N/A
Majority		17,739	4.54	−27.12
Turnout		3,90,967	54.28	+2.69
INC hold		Swing	-14.40	

=== General elections 1991 ===
1991 Indian general election: Bombay South
Party	Candidate	Votes	%	±%
INC	Murli Deora	147,576	51.53	+5.75
BJP	Premkumar Shankardutt Sharma	1,21,820	42.54	+1.30
JD	Suresh Murari Narwekar	11,782	4.11	−3.93
Majority		25,756	8.99	+4.45
Turnout		2,86,364	38.65	−15.63
INC hold		Swing	+5.75	

=== General elections 1996 ===
1996 Indian general election: Mumbai South
Party	Candidate	Votes	%	±%
BJP	Jayawantiben Mehta	138,831	44.68	+2.14
INC	Murli Deora	1,15,623	37.21	−14.32
SP	Marzban Patrawala	48,224	15.52	N/A
Majority		23,208	7.47	−1.52
Turnout		3,10,734		
BJP gain from INC		Swing	+2.14	

=== General elections 1998 ===
1998 Indian general election: Mumbai South
Party	Candidate	Votes	%	±%
INC	Murli Deora	178,597	52.59	+15.38
BJP	Jayawantiben Mehta	1,57,532	46.39	+1.71
Majority		21,065	6.20	−1.27
Turnout		3,39,598		
INC gain from BJP		Swing	+15.38	

=== General elections 1999 ===
1999 Indian general election: Mumbai South
Party	Candidate	Votes	%	±%
BJP	Jayawantiben Mehta	144,945	47.84	+1.45
INC	Murli Deora	1,34,702	44.46	−8.13
SP	Aziz Lalani	19,128	6.31	−9.21
Majority		10,243	3.38	−2.82
Turnout		3,02,999		
BJP gain from INC		Swing	+1.45	

=== General elections 2004 ===
2004 Indian general elections: Mumbai South
Party	Candidate	Votes	%	±%
INC	Milind Deora	137,956	50.28	+5.82
BJP	Jayawantiben Mehta	1,27,710	46.55	−1.29
SP	Amin Solkar	3,957	1.44	−4.89
BSP	Aziz Lalani	1,701	0.62	N/A
JP	Suhail Dil Nawaz	1,693	0.62	N/A
ABHM	Mahesh Gajanan Kulkarni	690	0.25	N/A
Akhil Bharatiya Jan Sangh	Ramnayak Tiwari	651	0.24	N/A
Majority		10,246	3.73	+0.35
Turnout		2,74,360	44.22	+2.09
INC gain from BJP		Swing	+5.82	

=== General elections 2009 ===
2009 Indian general elections: Mumbai South
Party	Candidate	Votes	%	±%
INC	Milind Deora	272,411	42.46	−7.82
MNS	Bala Nandgaonkar	1,59,729	24.90	N/A
SS	Mohan Rawale	1,46,118	22.78	N/A
BSP	Mohammad Ali Abubakar Shaikh	33,799	5.27	N/A
Independent	Meera H. Sanyal	10,157	1.58	N/A
Majority		1,12,682	17.56	+13.83
Turnout		6,41,571	40.36	−3.86
INC hold		Swing	-7.82	

=== General elections 2014 ===
2014 Indian general elections: Mumbai South
Party	Candidate	Votes	%	±%
SS	Arvind Ganpat Sawant	374,609	48.04	+25.27
INC	Milind Murli Deora	2,46,045	31.55	−10.91
MNS	Bala Nandgaonkar	84,773	10.87	−14.03
AAP	Meera Sanyal	40,298	5.17	N/A
NOTA	None of the Above	9,573	1.23	N/A
Majority		1,28,564	16.49	−1.07
Turnout		7,79,741	52.48	+12.12
SS gain from INC		Swing	+18.09	

=== General elections 2019 ===
2019 Indian general elections: Mumbai South
Party	Candidate	Votes	%	±%
SS	Arvind Ganpat Sawant	421,937	52.64	
INC	Milind Murli Deora	3,21,870	40.15	
VBA	Anil Choudhari	30,348	3.79	
NOTA	None of the Above	15,115	1.89	
Majority		1,00,067	12.49	
Turnout		8,01,799	51.59	
SS gain from INC		Swing		

=== General elections 2024 ===
Shiv Sena (Uddhav Balasaheb Thackeray)'s Arvind Ganpat Sawant won the seat by defeating Shiv Sena's Yamini Jadhav by 52,673 votes.

2024 Indian general elections: Mumbai South
Party	Candidate	Votes	%	±%
SS(UBT)	Arvind Ganpat Sawant	395,655	51.18	New
SS	Yamini Jadhav	3,42,982	44.36	▼8.28
VBA	Afzal S. Dawoodani	5,612	0.73	
NOTA	None of the Above	13,411	1.73	▼0.16
Majority		52,673	6.81	▼5.68
Turnout		7,73,328	50.33	▼1.26
SS(UBT) gain from SS		Swing		

== See also ==
- Mumbai
- List of constituencies of the Lok Sabha
