= Ram Bhankal =

Indian politician

- Ramdas Mahadev Bhankal
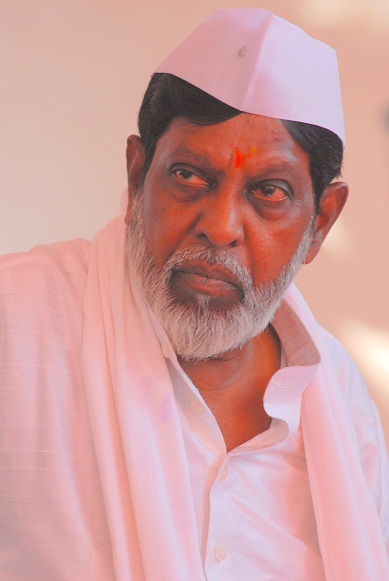

Social Worker and Deputy Leader Shiv Sena

Personal details
- Born: 16 October 1946 Bombay, India (Maharashtra, India)
- Died: 17 April 2013 (aged 66) Mumbai, Maharashtra, India
- Party: Shiv Sena
- Spouse: Vaishali Bhankal
- Website: www.rambhankal.in

Ram Bhankal (Native Name : Ramdas Mahadev Bhankal) (Marathi - राम भंकाळ) alias Ram Bhau (16 October 1946 - 17 April 2013) was an Indian politician and social worker of the party Shiv Sena, a right-wing Marathi party active mainly in the Western Indian state of Maharashtra. Shri Ram Bhankal was active in politics and social work for 47 years from 1966 to 2013.

== Introduction ==
Shiv Sena was established on 19 June 1966 by Bal Thackeray and from the first day of its formation hundreds of young Marathi men from all over Maharashtra came together inspired by the ideology of Bal Thackeray to fight for the rights of Marathi people. One of them at the forefront was Shri. Ram Bhankal. A journey from a common Shivsainik (party worker), Shakha Pramukh (Chief of a Shiv Sena branch) to Shiv Sena Upaneta (Deputy Leader), Shri Ram Bhankal was a practitioner of the philosophy laid down by Shiv Sena Chief, Bal Thackrey of 80% Samajkaran (Social work) and 20% Rajkaran (Politics).

== Political Work ==
Shri Ram Bhankal was an active participant in the movement for the rights of the indigenous people of Maharashtra to get first preference in jobs through Sthaniya Lokadhikar Samiti (a Shiv Sena affiliated organisation). As a Shiv Sena Sampark Pramukh (District Coordinator) he travelled through the corners of western Maharashtra like Satara, Sangli, Solapur etc. which had a strong hold of Congress (INC) to spread the message of Shiv Sena Chief Bal Thackrey of Marathi Pride and Hindutva and thus helped in the rise of Shiv Sena. He spread Bal Thackrey's Ideology like a messenger all over western Maharashtra with the help of his hard actuate speeches. Dubbed as Bal Thackrey's Savalaa Ram (सांवळा राम)he traveled from one village to another for the welfare of the people and played an important part in the rise of the party in these regions.

== Contribution to Society ==
He worked for the following organisations:

- Established the organisation called SHIVALAY ASHRAM SHALA (Shivalay Shikshan va Krida Prasarak Mandal) in 1995 a school which looks after the education, food and living of poor, wandering and tribal children in Northern region of Solapur district in Maharashtra.
- Minister in Social Welfare Department of Maharashtra Government in 1999
- Sthaniya Lokadhikar Samiti
- S.T. Kamgar Sanghatana (For the rights of workers in Maharashtra State Road Transport Corporation )
- Bank Karmachari Sanghatana (For the rights of workers in Banks)
- Mumbai MNC B.E.S.T. Samiti and many other organisations.
