= Waris Pathan =

Indian politician

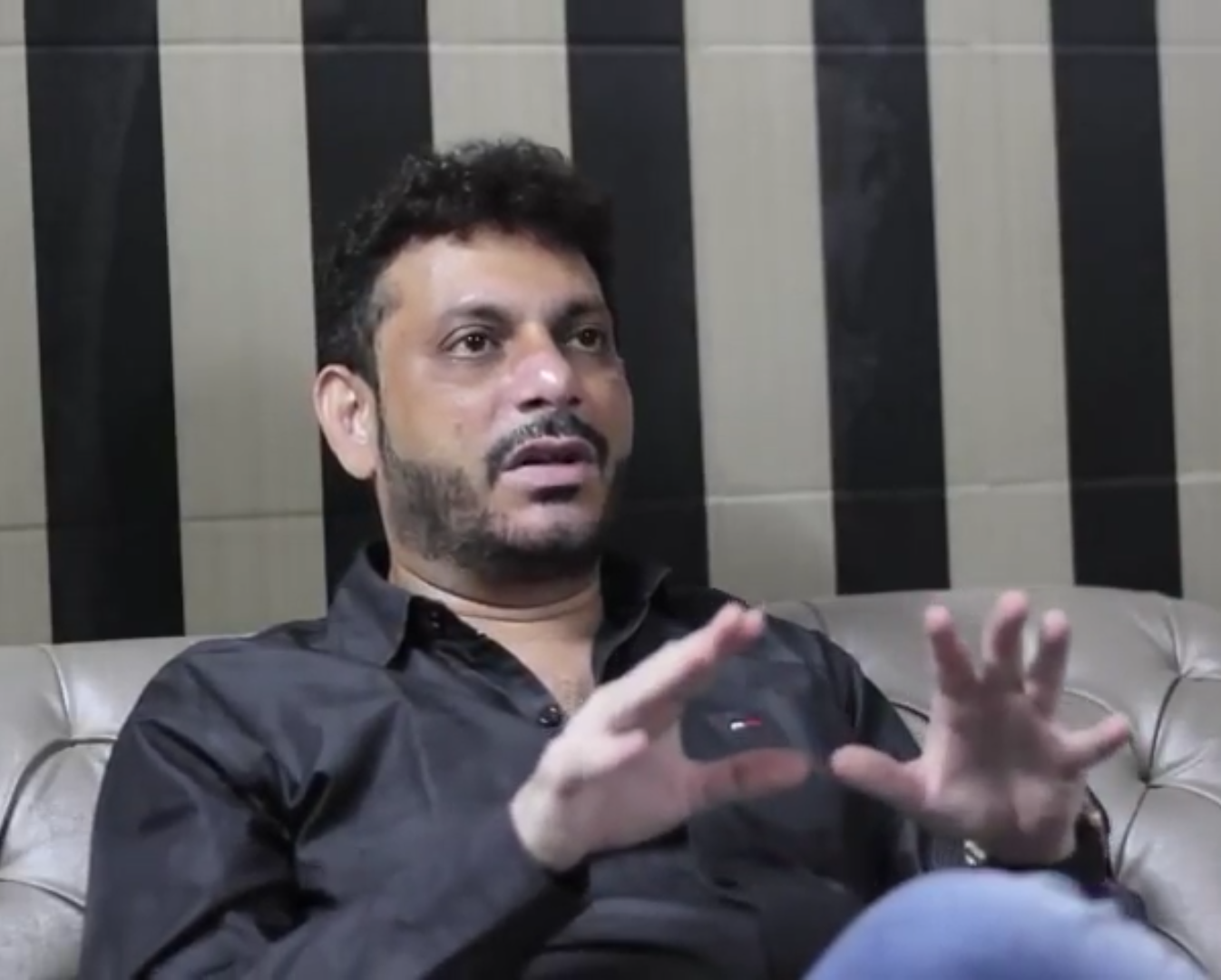
- Pathan during an interview

National Spokesperson of All India Majlis e Ittehadul Muslimeen
- Incumbent
- Assumed office 25 October 2019
- Preceded by: Asaduddin Owaisi

Member of the Maharashtra Legislative Assembly
- In office 16 October 2014 – 24 October 2019
- Preceded by: Madhukar Chavan, INC
- Succeeded by: Yamini Yashwant Jadhav, Shiv Sena
- Constituency: Byculla

Floor leader of All India Majlis-e-Ittehadul Muslimeen in Maharashtra Legislative Assembly
- In office 16 October 2014 – 24 October 2019
- Preceded by: Position Established
- Succeeded by: Mohammed Ismail Abdul Khalique

Personal details
- Born: 29 November 1968 (age 57) Mumbai, Maharashtra, India
- Party: All India Majlis-e-Ittehadul Muslimeen
- Children: 2
- Occupation: Politician
- Profession: Lawyer

Waris Pathan (born 29 November 1968) is an Indian politician and lawyer. He is serving as the national spokesperson of the All India Majlis-e-Ittehadul Muslimeen (AIMIM) political party since 2019. He previously served as an MLA for the AIMIM in Byculla, Mumbai.

As a legal advocate, Pathan's clients have included one of the accused in the 1993 Bombay bombings, and the actor Salman Khan in a hit-and-run case.

== Personal life ==
Pathan was born in Bandra, Mumbai on 29 November 1968 to Yusuf Pathan. Pathan has vitiligo, an autoimmune disease which causes white patches on the skin.

Pathan joined the legal profession in August 1991. He was the first lawyer to get a TADA accused bail out on interim bail on medical grounds. The Supreme Court of India has upheld the bail order in favour of the accused (Abdul Hamid Birya v/s state).

== Political career ==
In 2014 Pathan was elected Member of the Legislative Assembly on an All India Majlis-e-Ittehadul Muslimeen (AIMIM) ticket from Mumbai's Byculla assembly constituency.

On 16 March 2016, Pathan was unanimously suspended from the Maharashtra Assembly on charges of disrespecting the country and anti-nationalism for refusing to chant the slogan Bharat Mata Ki Jai (Victory for Mother India) when asked to do so in the assembly by Bharatiya Janata Party MLA Ram Kadam. He later said, "I love my country. I was born here and I will die here. I can never dream of insulting my country. Don’t judge anyone's love for the country by just one slogan. Jai Hind, Jai Bharat, Jai Maharashtra (Victory to India, Victory to Maharashtra)".

He contested the 2019 Maharashtra Legislative Assembly election from Byculla, but was defeated by Yamini Yashwant Jadhav of Shiv Sena.

In January 2020, Pathan was appointed the national spokesperson of AIMIM.

== Controversy ==
On 19 February 2020, during a rally against the Citizenship Amendment Act, Pathan said, "Remember we are 15 crore but can dominate over 100 crore." He was criticised for his comment. After this incident an FIR was filed against him. In his defence, Pathan said the "100" in his statement was not in reference to the 100 crore Hindus in India, as the media and BJP had suggested, but to those "100 people" who are engaging in anti-Muslim politics. AIMIM Maharashtra unit chief Imtiyaz Jaleel said that the party will seek an explanation from Pathan over his remark.
