= Murli Deora =

Indian politician, Mayor of Mumbai (1937–2014)

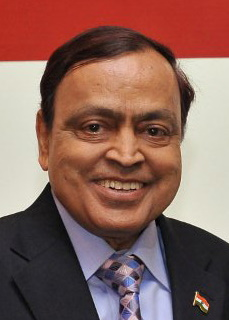
- Deora in 2011

Union Minister of Corporate Affairs
- In office 19 January 2011 – 12 July 2011
- Prime Minister: Manmohan Singh
- Deputy: R. P. N. Singh
- Preceded by: Salman Khurshid
- Succeeded by: Veerappa Moily

Union Minister of Petroleum and Natural Gas
- In office 28 May 2009 – 19 January 2011
- Prime Minister: Manmohan Singh
- Deputy: Jitin Prasada
- Succeeded by: Jaipal Reddy
- In office 29 January 2006 – 22 May 2009
- Prime Minister: Manmohan Singh
- Deputy: Dinsha Patel
- Preceded by: Mani Shankar Aiyar

Member of Parliament, Rajya Sabha
- In office 3 April 2002 – 24 November 2014
- Constituency: Maharashtra

Member of Parliament, Lok Sabha for Mumbai South
- In office 1998–1999
- Preceded by: Jayawantiben Mehta
- Succeeded by: Jayawantiben Mehta
- In office 1984–1996
- Preceded by: Ratansingh Rajda
- Succeeded by: Jayawantiben Mehta

Mayor of Mumbai
- In office 1977–1978
- Preceded by: Manohar Joshi
- Succeeded by: Wamanrao Mahadik

Personal details
- Born: 10 January 1937 Bombay, Bombay Presidency, British India
- Died: 24 November 2014 (aged 77) Mumbai, Maharashtra, India
- Party: Indian National Congress
- Children: Milind Deora
- Education: Bombay University

Murli Deora (10 January 1937 – 24 November 2014) was an Indian politician, businessman, and social worker. He was the Mayor of Mumbai, a Member of Parliament in both the Upper and Lower Houses, and a Minister of Cabinet rank. He was a member of the Indian National Congress.

== Early life ==
Deora was born in Bombay in a Marwari family, and received his BA from Bombay University. His family came from Laxmangarh in Rajasthan.

== Landmark case ==
In 2001, Deora won a landmark Supreme Court case that ended smoking in public places. In the absence of statutory provisions at that time, the Court prohibited smoking in public places such as auditoriums, hospital buildings, health institutions, educational institutions, libraries, court buildings, public offices, and public conveyances, including the railways.

"Tobacco is universally regarded as one of the major public health hazards and is responsible directly or indirectly for an estimated eight lakh deaths annually in the country. It has also been found that treatment of tobacco related diseases and the loss of productivity caused therein cost the country almost Rs. 13,500 crores annually, which more than offsets all the benefits accruing in the form of revenue and employment generated by tobacco industry".

— Supreme Court of India, Murli S. Deora vs Union of India and Others on 2 November 2001

== Political career ==
The industrialist and social worker-turned-politician began his work with the Bombay Municipal Corporation in 1968 when he was elected as a corporator. Later, in 1977, Deora was elected mayor of Bombay with the support of Shiv Sena. He first contested the Lok Sabha polls from Bombay South constituency in 1980 but lost to the Janata Party's Ratansingh Rajda though, in the subsequent election, Deora defeated BJP's Jayawantiben Mehta by a huge margin. He was re-elected in 1989, 1991 but lost to Mehta in 1996 and 1999 before his son, Milind, defeated Mehta to go to the Lok Sabha from the same constituency in 2004. Deora is a trusted aide of the Gandhi family in Mumbai. He was elected to the Rajya Sabha in 2004 and was inducted in the Union cabinet as petroleum minister in January 2006.

From 29 January 2006 to 18 January 2011, he served as Union Minister for Petroleum and Natural Gas. From 18 January 2011 to 12 July 2011, he served as Minister of Corporate Affairs

He was president of the Mumbai Regional Congress Committee for 22 years from 1981 to 2003.

In the Congress re-election in 2009, Deora retained the portfolio of Petroleum and Natural Gas in the second government under Prime Minister Manmohan Singh.

== Philanthropy ==
=== Free computer education ===
As Vice-Chairman of Bhavan's Gandhi Institute of Computer Technology, Deora made it his mission to spread computer literacy for better job opportunities by kickstarting the Free Computer Education Program.

In 2000, he brought Bill Gates to the center, which received a US$5 million grant from the Bill & Melinda Gates Foundation for its good work.

Today, the program has over 56 centres all over India, and over 3,56,519 people have benefited from it.

=== Eye camps ===
Deora believed everyone had the right to see properly, and organised over 78 eye camps in Mumbai, where more than 5000 to 7000 people have had their eyes tested and receive free spectacles, as well as free eye surgery and in every camp 300 to 400 Free Cataract operation with Pathological check-up for operation has been done.

== Personal life ==
Murli Deora was married at a young age to Hema Deora, a lady from his own community and similar social background, in a match arranged by their families in the usual Indian way. They had two sons.

One of their sons, Milind Murli Deora, followed his father into politics and was Lok Sabha member from Mumbai. He is married to Pooja Deora, daughter of Manmohan Shetty, founder of Adlabs, a prominent media and entertainment firm.

The couple's other son, Mukul Deora, is married to Nitasha Deora. Born a member of the Thapar business family, Nitasha Deora is the daughter of Vikram Thapar and great-granddaughter of Karam Chand Thapar.

== Death and tributes ==
After Deora's death, both houses of Parliament were adjourned on the first day of the winter session as a mark of respect for him, as well as other members who had died.

Tributes came in regardless of party lines, with Prime Minister Narendra Modi expressing his sadness and describing Deora as "a dedicated leader," whose "warm nature made him popular across party lines."

Finance Minister Arun Jaitley penned a front-page tribute to Deora in The Times of India, calling him "extremely helpful" and someone whose "strength lay in the fact that he never criticized even those he did not like".

HDFC Chairman Deepak Parekh said, "he was a very warm and kind-hearted person, and never turned away any person who came seeking his help and always kept his word."

Pranay Gupta, for The Huffington Post, noted that, "at a personal level, he was incorruptible", and that, "perhaps more than any Indian politician of his generation, Murli was genuinely liked in public and private. That's because he had a good word for all, and extended a helpful hand to many. To be a politician means to serve — and serve Murli did, in a land where ministers and bureaucrats often ignore the masses except during election time, where high officials expect their constituents to genuflect and undertake a thousand salaams before even being allowed to enter the corridors of power. But Murli's door was always open."

Shankar Aiyar spoke about Deora's humble beginnings, about "the Murli who wore the same set of clothes — washed at night and ironed "with a lotta with coal in it"; the Murli who hung outside the neighbour's window to listen to songs and studied under the street lamp at Babulnath", and how, as a powerful politician, he used his contacts to help the poor and needy. How "every new billion-dollar acquaintance was converted into a philanthropist — convinced to donate a heart lung machine to a municipal hospital, pay for an eye camp, fund the computer literacy for jobs programme at Bharatiya Vidya Bhavan, and more."

Political offices
Preceded by Mani Shankar Aiyar	Minister of Petroleum and Natural Gas; 2006-2011	Succeeded by Jaipal Reddy
