= Byculla Assembly constituency =

Constituency of the Maharashtra legislative assembly in India

Coordinates: 18.98°N 72.83°E

Byculla
- Constituency No. 184 for the Maharashtra Legislative Assembly

Constituency details
- Country: India
- Region: Western India
- State: Maharashtra
- District: Mumbai City
- Lok Sabha constituency: Mumbai South
- Established: 1952
- Total electors: 258,880
- Reservation: None

Member of Legislative Assembly
- 15th Maharashtra Legislative Assembly
- Incumbent Manoj Jamsutkar
- Party: SS(UBT)
- Alliance: MVA
- Elected year: 2024

Byculla Assembly constituency is one of the 288 Vidhan Sabha (legislative assembly) constituencies of Maharashtra state in western India.

== Overview ==
Byculla (constituency number 184) is one of the 10 Vidhan Sabha constituencies located in the Mumbai City district. Number of electorates in 2009 was 271,507 (male 153,641, female 117,866) 137,820 are minority voters present in large numbers.

Byculla is part of the Mumbai South Lok Sabha constituency along with five other Vidhan Sabha segments in Mumbai City district, namely Worli, Shivadi, Colaba, Malabar Hill and Mumbadevi.

== Members of the Legislative Assembly ==
Year	Member	Party
1952	Silam Sayaji Laxman	Indian National Congress
1957	Jagtap Bapurao Dhondiba	Communist Party of India
1957	Boricha Paljibhai Hamabhai (Sc)	Scheduled Castes Federation
1962	Qamar Nayar Ahmed	Indian National Congress
1967	G. B. Ganacharya	Communist Party of India
1972	Vasant Hoshing	Indian National Congress
1977-2008: See Chinchpokli & Nagpada
2009	Madhukar Chavan	Indian National Congress
2014	Waris Pathan	All India Majlis-e-Ittehadul Muslimeen
2019	Yamini Jadhav	Shiv Sena
2024	Manoj Jamsutkar	Shiv Sena (UBT)

== Election results ==
=== Assembly Election 2024 ===
2024 Maharashtra Legislative Assembly election : Byculla
Party	Candidate	Votes	%	±%
SS(UBT)	Manoj Jamsutkar	80,133	58.76%	New
SS	Yamini Yashwant Jadhav	48,772	35.77%	▼6.21
AIMIM	Faiyaz Ahmed	5,531	4.06%	▼21.50
NOTA	None of the Above	1,581	1.16%	▼1.13
Margin of victory		31,361	23.00%	▲6.58
Turnout		1,37,947	53.29%	▲3.09
Total valid votes		1,36,366		
Registered electors		2,58,880		▲5.27
SS(UBT) gain from SS		Swing	▲16.79	

=== Assembly Election 2019 ===
2019 Maharashtra Legislative Assembly election : Byculla
Party	Candidate	Votes	%	±%
SS	Yamini Yashwant Jadhav	51,180	41.97%	New
AIMIM	Waris Pathan	31,157	25.55%	▲4.96
INC	Anna Madhu Chavan	24,139	19.80%	▲1.88
ABS	Geeta Ajay Gawli	10,493	8.61%	▼8.39
NOTA	None of the Above	2,791	2.29%	▲0.97
Independent	Ajaz Khan	2,174	1.78%	New
Independent	Francis Sabastian D’Souza	929	0.76%	New
Margin of victory		20,023	16.42%	▲15.32
Turnout		1,24,771	50.74%	▼4.54
Total valid votes		1,21,932		
Registered electors		2,45,923		▲8.27
SS gain from AIMIM		Swing	▲21.38	

=== Assembly Election 2014 ===
2014 Maharashtra Legislative Assembly election : Byculla
Party	Candidate	Votes	%	±%
AIMIM	Waris Pathan	25,314	20.59%	New
BJP	Madhu (Dada) Chavan	23,957	19.49%	New
INC	Anna Alias Madhu Chavan	22,021	17.91%	▼13.31
ABS	Geeta Ajay Gawli	20,895	17.00%	▼5.11
MNS	Sanjay Gopal Naik	19,762	16.08%	▼7.32
Independent	Lokhande Rohidas Madhukar	7,865	6.40%	New
NOTA	None of the Above	1,620	1.32%	New
BSP	Pravin Shivram Pawar	1,341	1.09%	▲0.38
Margin of victory		1,357	1.10%	▼6.73
Turnout		1,24,547	54.83%	▲11.29
Total valid votes		1,22,924		
Registered electors		2,27,143		▼16.34
AIMIM gain from INC		Swing	▼10.63	

=== Assembly Election 2009 ===
2009 Maharashtra Legislative Assembly election : Byculla
Party	Candidate	Votes	%	±%
INC	Chavan Madhukar Balkrishna Alias Anna	36,302	31.22%	▼14.75
MNS	Sanjay Gopal Naik	27,198	23.39%	New
ABS	Arun Gulab Gawli	25,703	22.11%	New
SS	Yashwant Jadhav	20,692	17.80%	New
SP	Sarfaraz Aarju	3,708	3.19%	New
BSP	Tambe Bhagwan Ramdas	832	0.72%	New
Margin of victory		9,104	7.83%	▲2.53
Turnout		1,16,272	42.82%	▼17.45
Total valid votes		1,16,270		
Registered electors		2,71,507		▲200.32
INC hold		Swing	▼14.75	

=== Assembly Election 1972 ===
1972 Maharashtra Legislative Assembly election : Byculla
Party	Candidate	Votes	%	±%
INC	Hoshing Vasant Rangnath	25,049	45.97%	▲6.22
CPI	Ganacharya G. Bhaurao	22,159	40.67%	▼3.52
Independent	Ravindranath N. Kulkarni	4,874	8.94%	New
CPI(M)	Ansari Md. M. Bashir	2,408	4.42%	New
Margin of victory		2,890	5.30%	▲0.87
Turnout		55,349	61.22%	▼2.90
Total valid votes		54,490		
Registered electors		90,407		▲8.92
INC gain from CPI		Swing	▲1.79	

=== Assembly Election 1967 ===
1967 Maharashtra Legislative Assembly election : Byculla
Party	Candidate	Votes	%	±%
CPI	G. B. Ganacharaya	23,168	44.18%	▲13.92
INC	M. G. Faki	20,844	39.75%	▲4.60
SWA	S. J. Fernandes	4,553	8.68%	New
ABJS	V. A. Mishra	3,704	7.06%	▲1.98
Margin of victory		2,324	4.43%	▼0.45
Turnout		53,985	65.04%	▲4.11
Total valid votes		52,436		
Registered electors		83,005		▼11.22
CPI gain from INC		Swing	▲9.03	

=== Assembly Election 1962 ===
1962 Maharashtra Legislative Assembly election : Byculla
Party	Candidate	Votes	%	±%
INC	Qamar Nayer Ahmed	19,409	35.15%	▲17.50
CPI	Bapurao Dhondiba Jagtap	16,713	30.27%	▼3.29
Independent	Shabbir Amed A. Kadir Ansari	8,900	16.12%	New
PSP	Karbhari Pandurang Barawkar	6,587	11.93%	New
ABJS	Krishnakant Balkrishna Pandare	2,808	5.09%	New
Socialist Party (India)	Sayed Mohammed Akram Noghamed Afzal	648	1.17%	New
Margin of victory		2,696	4.88%	▲3.71
Turnout		56,724	60.67%	▼77.60
Total valid votes		55,217		
Registered electors		93,494		▼34.20
INC gain from CPI		Swing	▲1.59	

=== Assembly Election 1957 ===
1957 Bombay State Legislative Assembly election : Byculla
Party	Candidate	Votes	%	±%
CPI	Jagtap Bapurao Dhondiba	65,165	33.56%	New
SCF	Boricha Paljibhai Hamabhai (Sc)	62,884	32.38%	New
INC	Khaire Ramchandra Annaji (Sc)	34,268	17.65%	▼30.83
INC	Sardar Pratapsingh Laxmidas	31,870	16.41%	▼32.07
Margin of victory		2,281	1.17%	▼20.61
Turnout		194,187	136.66%	▲79.20
Total valid votes		194,187		
Registered electors		142,092		▲169.03
CPI gain from INC		Swing	▼14.92	

=== Assembly Election 1952 ===
1952 Bombay State Legislative Assembly election : Tank Pakhadi Byculla West
Party	Candidate	Votes	%	±%
INC	Silam, Sayaji Lakshman	14,714	48.48%	New
SP	Mahajani, Damodar Ganesh	8,103	26.70%	New
Independent	Jagtap, Bapurao Dhondiba	6,968	22.96%	New
Independent	Khandray, Rajaram Madhavrao	567	1.87%	New
Margin of victory		6,611	21.78%	
Turnout		30,352	57.47%	
Total valid votes		30,352		
Registered electors		52,817		
INC win (new seat)				

== See also ==
- Byculla
- List of constituencies of Maharashtra Vidhan Sabha
