= Milind Deora =

Indian politician (born 1976)

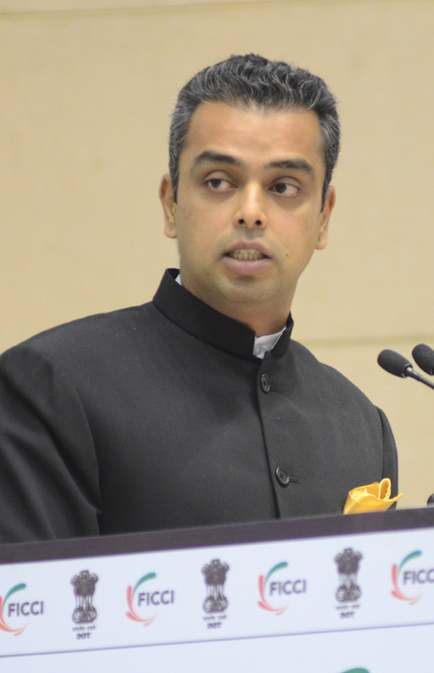
- Deora in 2012

Member of Parliament, Rajya Sabha
- Incumbent
- Assumed office 3 April 2024
- Constituency: Maharashtra

Member of Parliament, Lok Sabha
- In office 13 May 2004 – 16 May 2014
- Preceded by: Jayawantiben Mehta
- Succeeded by: Arvind Sawant
- Constituency: Mumbai South, Maharashtra

Union Minister of State for Communications and Information Technology
- In office July 2011 – May 2014

Union Minister of State for Shipping
- In office October 2012 – May 2014

Personal details
- Born: 4 December 1976 (age 49) Bombay, Maharashtra, India
- Party: Shiv Sena (2024–present)
- Other political affiliations: Indian National Congress (2004–2024)
- Spouse: Pooja Shetty (m. 2008)
- Parent: Murli Deora (father)
- Education: Boston University (BBA)
- Occupation: Politician; business advisor
- Website: milinddeora.in
- As of 14 January, 2024

Milind Murli Deora (born 4 December 1976) is an Indian politician who currently serves as a member of parliament in the Rajya Sabha from Maharashtra. He previously held key positions within the Government of India, notably as the minister of state for communications and information and technology and shipping in the second Manmohan Singh ministry. He is currently in the Shiv Sena party which he joined after quitting the Congress party in January 2024.

Deora is known for his early entry into Indian politics becoming one of the youngest members of parliament at the age of 27. He served as a member of the 14th and 15th Lok Sabha, representing the prestigious Mumbai South constituency. He played a significant role in advocating for urban infrastructure projects and championed causes like public sanitation, healthcare, and beautification projects in Mumbai.

Milind serves on the boards of Arctic Circle based in Reykjavík, his alma mater Boston University, the United Nations' Health Innovation Exchange based in Geneva and the US-India Strategic Forum based in Washington DC.

== Early life and education ==
Milind Deora was born into a Marwari family from Rajasthan with a rich political legacy. His father, Murli Deora, served as the mayor of Mumbai, and was subsequently a four-term Member of Parliament for the Mumbai South Constituency.

Deora attended the Cathedral and John Connon School and Sydenham College. He later acquired a Bachelor of Business Administration from the Questrom School of Business at Boston University.

== Family Legacy ==
Deora's father, Murli Deora was one of the senior leaders of the Indian National Congress in Mumbai and the longest serving president of the Mumbai Regional Congress Committee. He served as the mayor of Mumbai, a member of parliament in both the Upper and Lower Houses and a minister of Cabinet rank.

The Deora family is known for strengthening Indo-US ties, with both Murli Deora and Milind Deora playing key roles as interlocutors between the US and India governments. The Deoras have maintained cordial relationships across party lines.

The family is also deeply connected with the business world in India. In 1999, Murli Deora was endorsed by Dhirubhai Ambani as South Mumbai MP. In 2019, Milind Deora was endorsed by his son, Mukesh Ambani while running for office in the same constituency.

== Political career ==
=== Legislative career ===
Deora contested the Lok Sabha elections in 2004 as a member of the Indian National Congress. He was elected to the 14th Lok Sabha, winning from the Mumbai South constituency against the BJP's Jayawantiben Mehta, who was then a Union Minister. Milind Deora was one of the youngest members of the 14th Lok Sabha.

In 2004, he served as a member of the Standing Committee on Defence along with the Consultative Committee in the Ministry of Defence. From 2006 onwards, he was a member of the Consultative Committee in the Ministry of Urban Development. He also initiated the debate on the Right to Information Bill in the Lok Sabha.

Deora pushed for increased central assistance to fund Urban infrastructure projects, ensuring Mumbai and Maharashtra received substantial grants under the Jawaharlal Nehru Urban Renewal Mission. After the 26 July floods, he took to the Parliament to secure 1200 crore (Rs. 12 Billion) rupees for the BMC to completely revamp its Storm Water Disposal System.

In the 2009 elections, Deora was elected again from Mumbai South Constituency, this time with a ten-fold increase in his victory margin. He was a member of the Committee on Information Technology, the Consultative Committee in the Ministry of Civil Aviation, and the Committee on Estimates.

Deora facilitated the expedited implementation of critical infrastructure projects such as the Eastern Freeway, the Atal Setu (Mumbai Trans-Harbor Link), the Bandra Worli Sea-Link and the Mumbai Metro Projects by securing funds from both central and state governments. He used his MPLADS funds for issues such as public toilets, drainage lines, repairing of roads, and initiating the beautification of destinations including Marine Drive, the Gateway of India and Jhaveri Bazaar.

=== Ministerial career ===
Milind Deora was inducted into the second Manmohan Singh ministry as Union Minister of State for Communications and Information Technology in July 2011. As minister, Deora worked on strengthening regulatory frameworks, bolstering e-governance infrastructure and creating cyber security norms.

He formulated the National E-Governance Policy (NEGP) to reduce bureaucratic corruption and inefficiency, promoting citizen friendly provisions like passport delivery within days. Deora also spearheaded the National Cyber Security Policy of 2013 to ensure a comprehensive, collaborative and collective response to deal with the issue of cyber security. He also reduced the limits for radiation from mobile towers to 1/10th to combat the dangerous health risks.

In October 2012, Deora was given additional charge as Union Minister of State for Shipping. He introduced a landmark lighthouse tourism policy, through which more than 180 lighthouses across India's 7,500 kilometer coastline would be revitalized.

Deora also undertook significant reforms to make Indian ports more competitive, rehauling the TAMP policy to bring about greater parity in pricing at all ports.

=== Shiv Sena ===
Deora was elected as a member of parliament, Rajya Sabha from Maharashtra as part of the Shiv Sena after leaving Congress in January 2024. Explaining his switch, he stated, "Regrettably the current state of the Congress no longer resonates with the party that my father Murlibhai and I joined in 1968 and 2004 respectively. It has deviated from its ideological and organisational roots, lacking appreciation for honesty and constructive criticism."

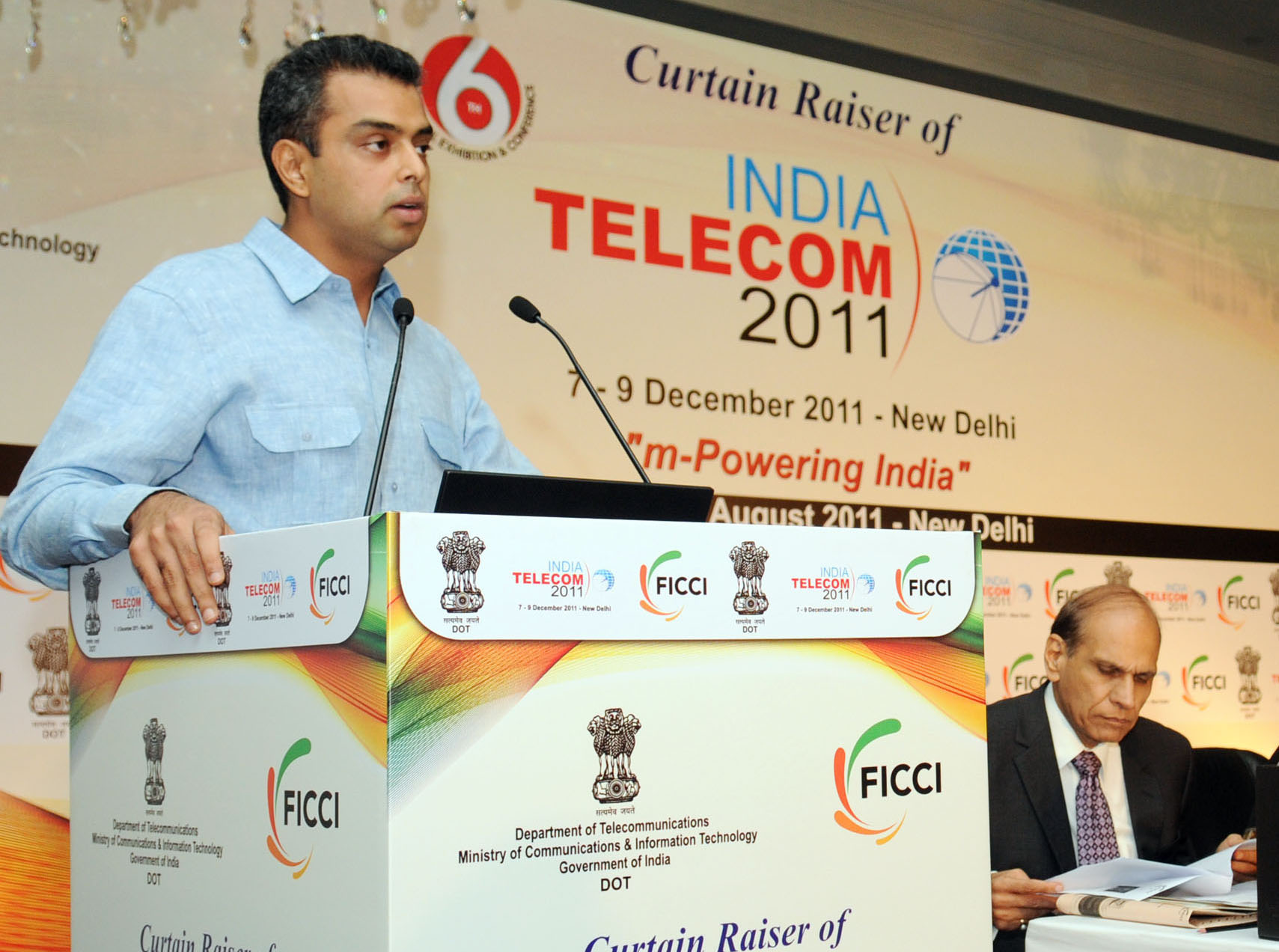
Milind Deora addressing at the curtain raiser ceremony of International Exhibition and Conference – ‘India Telecom 2011m-powering India’, organized by DOT and FICCI, in New Delhi on August 29, 2011

== Policy Initiatives ==
Deora has supported various policy initiatives aimed at bringing about positive change in society. From advocating for accountability in local governance through the DMDA (Direct Mayor, Direct Accountability) campaign to championing infrastructure development projects like the Mumbai Trans Harbour Link (Atal Setu) and the Eastern Freeway, he has been instrumental in several key initiatives.

His most significant achievement has been the implementation of Cluster Redevelopment Schemes in Mumbai. As an MP, Deora brought India's first cluster redevelopment scheme in India to Mumbai. This ensured not only the redevelopment of dilapidated buildings and the delivery of affordable housing to all sections of society but also expanded civic amenities for the neighborhood.

Deora has consistently supported youth empowerment, spearheading initiatives like the Youth Parliament and the Mumbai Soccer Hunt, a competition that democratizes sports infrastructure and allows winners from the competition the opportunity to train with Queens Park Rangers in the UK.

Deora is known for taking contrarian stances on critical issues demonstrating his independence and commitment to principles. He spoke out against corruption in the Adarsh scam despite being a part of the ruling party. Amidst criticism of the UPA government's decision to pass an ordinance on convicted legislators, he publicly voiced his opposition, expressing concern that allowing convicted legislators to retain their seats during an appeal could undermine public faith in democracy.

While in the opposition, he supported the Government's ban of the Chinese video-sharing application, TikTok in 2020.

== Personal life ==
Milind Deora is the son of Murli Deora. He is an accomplished Blues and rock guitarist, having performed with Jazz musicians in Mumbai and internationally.

He is married to Pooja Shetty, who heads the film production company Walk Water Media. She is the daughter of noted film producer Manmohan Shetty, who founded Walkwater Media Ltd in 2007. Milind's brother, Mukul, is a disc jockey, and a film director and producer.

Bollywood actor Abhishek Bachchan has also publicly acknowledged that he modelled his look in the 2007 film Paa after Milind Deora and politician Sachin Pilot.

== Member of Committee ==
Deora was member of the following Committees till he assumed the office of Minister of State in July 2011.

- Standing Committee, Ministry of Defence
- Consultative Committee, Ministry of Defence
- Consultative Committee, Ministry of Urban Development
- Committee on Information Technology
- Consultative Committee, Ministry of Civil Aviation
- Committee on Estimates

Lok Sabha
Preceded by Jayawantiben Mehta	Member of Parliament for Mumbai South; 2004 – 2014
