= Yamini Jadhav =

Indian politician

Yamini Yashwant Jadhav
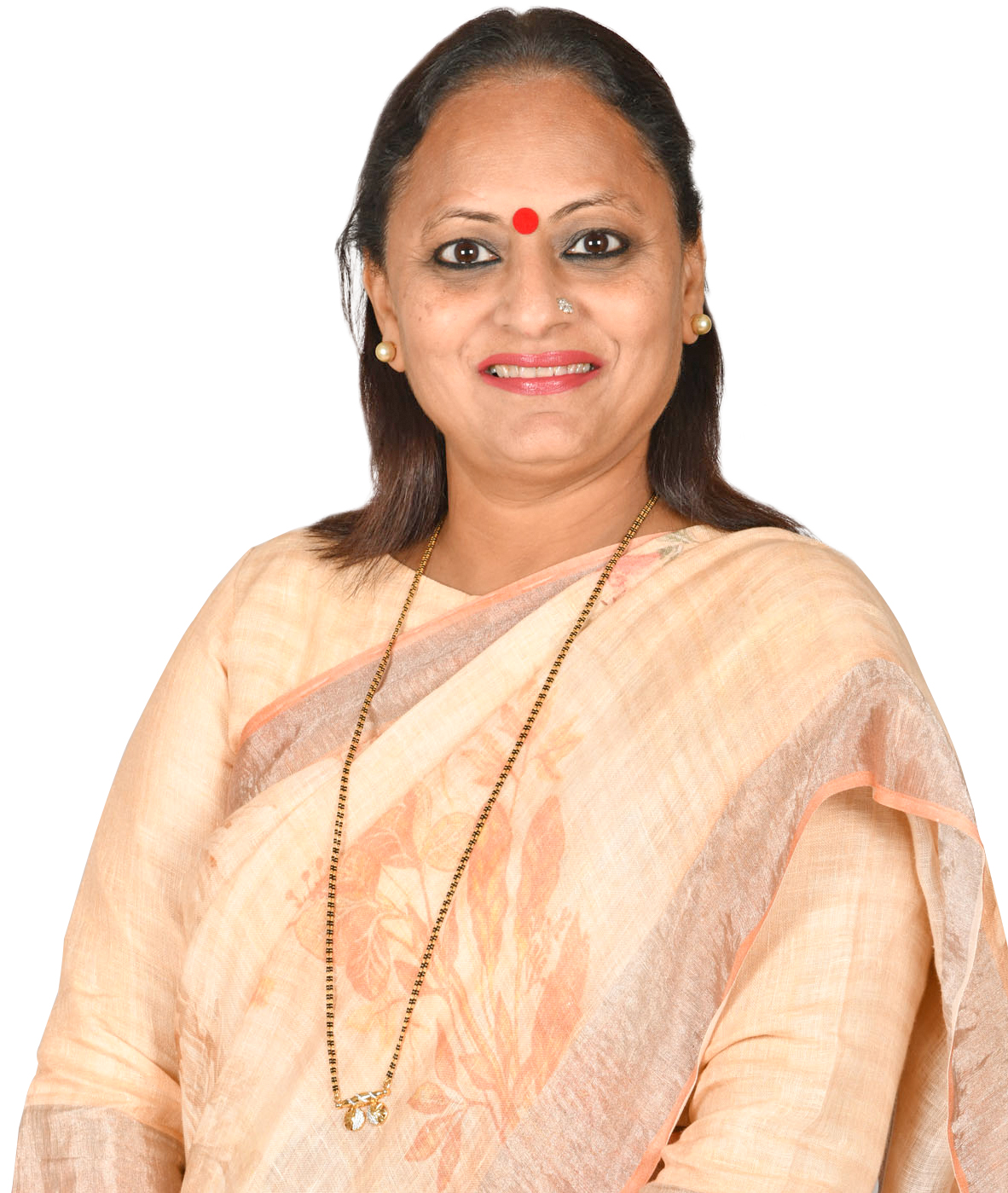
- Official portrait of Yamini Yashwant Jadhav

Member of Legislative Assembly Maharashtra
- In office 24 October 2019 – 23 October 2024
- Preceded by: Waris Pathan, AIMIM
- Succeeded by: Manoj Jamsutkar
- Constituency: Byculla

Personal details
- Party: Shiv Sena
- Relations: Yashwant Jadhav (Husband)

Yamini Yashwant Jadhav is a Shiv Sena politician from Mumbai, Maharashtra. She lost her seat as a Member of Legislative Assembly from Byculla Vidhan Sabha constituency.

Jadhav is an official candidate of Shiv Sena in the 2024 Lok Sabha election from the Mumbai South Lok Sabha constituency.

== Positions held ==
- 2012: Elected as Corporator in Brihanmumbai Municipal Corporation
- 2019: Elected to Maharashtra Legislative Assembly
