= Sthaniya Lokadhikar Samiti =

Sthaniya Lokadhikar Samiti is a Shiv Sena affiliated organisation for the preservation of rights of employment for Maharashtrians in the Indian state of Maharashtra. The name of the organisation approximately translates to "Association for the Rights of Local Citizens". According to Patel, the Samiti was a front for the Shiv Sena to "ensure jobs for its youth in the government and banking sectors as well as... engineering and pharmaceutical units in the Thane - Belapur region"
