= Manoj Jamsutkar =

Indian politician

Manoj Pandurang Jamsutkar (born 1969) is an Indian politician from Maharashtra. He is an MLA from Byculla Assembly constituency in Mumbai City district. He won the 2024 Maharashtra Legislative Assembly election representing the Shiv Sena (UBT).

== Early life and education ==
Jamsutkar is from Byculla, Mumbai City district, Maharashtra. He is the son of Pandurang Jamsutkar. He studied Class 12 at Elphinstone Technical High School and Jounior College, Dhobitalao, Mumbai and passed the HSC examination in 1990. His wife Sonam served as a corporator.

== Career ==
Jamsutkar won from Byculla Assembly constituency representing Shiv Sena (UBT) in the 2024 Maharashtra Legislative Assembly election. He polled 80,133 votes and defeated his nearest rival and sitting MLA, Yamini Jadhav of the Shiv Sena, by a margin of 31,361 votes. Earlier, he contested unsuccessfully from Shivadi Assembly constituency on the Indian National Congress ticket in the 2014 Maharashtra Legislative Assembly election. In 2012, he switched over from Shiv Sena to Congress.
