= Thane – Belapur region =

The Thane – Belapur region is one of the largest industrial regions in India, and for a time in all of Asia. In 2006 it had 1136 industries generating industrial effluent. In 1994 it produced 100 tons of solid waste, 80 per cent of it being either acidic or alkaline, with five tons of waste containing halogens making it difficult to treat. The bulk of this waste, along with municipal solid waste, polluted water bodies in the vicinity. The industrial turnover for the year 2002-03 was Rs. 10000 crores, fifteen per cent of this being exported. Maharashtra Industrial Development Corporation established and industrial estate, to the north of Thane - Belapur Road in 1963. It has an area of 27 km^{2} and comprises about 2200 units. The region has chemical, textile, bulk-drug manufacturing plants and IT parks, James Heitzman considers it to be India's main petrochemical belt. In 1971 there were 44 industries were located in it employing 16000 personnel, who all commuted to work from outside the region. By the end of the last millennium, stagnation had set in these industries, following a trend that saw a shift from secondary to tertiary employment.

== Guides ==
Freelance guides are a feature of this area. They are former industrial workers who have been laid redundant. Traffic rules in the area allow heavy transport vehicles entry only during night time. These vehicles come from all over India. The drivers of these vehicles can only speak their mother-tongues most of the times, which may be different from the languages spoken in the area. Additionally they find it difficult to navigate to their destination during the night considering that at night there are fewer road users to guide them. These drivers carry addresses written either in Devnagari or in English. Freelance guides being former workers know the area well, on redundancy in their earlier employment, they; using their knowledge of the area, offered themselves as guides.

== See also ==
- Economy of India
- Environmental issues in India
