= Ratansinh Rajda =

Indian politician

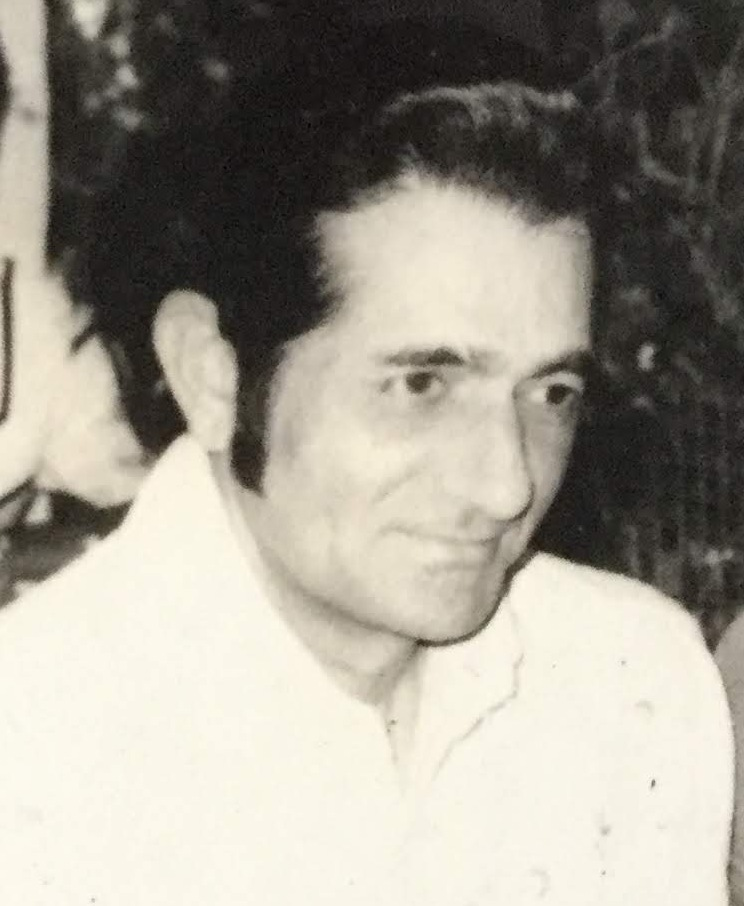

Member of Parliament, Lok Sabha
- In office 1977–1984
- Preceded by: Kailas Narain Narula Shivnarain
- Succeeded by: Murli Deora
- Constituency: Mumbai South

Personal details
- Born: 19 December 1927 Khambalia, Jamnagar, Gujarat
- Died: 10 April 1998 (aged 70) Mumbai, Maharashtra, India
- Party: Janata Party
- Other political affiliations: Indian National Congress

Ratansinh Rajda (19 December 1927 – 10 April 1998) was an Indian politician. He was member of the 6th and 7th Lok Sabha. He represented Mumbai South constituency and was a member of the Janata Party.

== Life and career ==
He was born on 19 December 1927, at Khambhalia in Jamnagar district of Gujarat. He attended St. Xavier's College and Government Law College in Bombay. In 1954, he married Hansaben Rajda. The couple had two daughters. He participated in various freedom struggles before 1947.

During The Emergency, he was arrested under Maintenance of Internal Security Act (MISA) and spent 19 months in jail. In 1977, he joined Janata Party and was elected from Mumbai South constituency to 6th Lok Sabha. He was re-elected to 7th Lok Sabha from Mumbai South.

== Positions held ==
- 1947–1948 General Secretary, Bombay Student Congress.
- 1971–1974 General Secretary, Bombay Pradesh Congress Committee (Organisation).
- 1974 Chairman, Works Committee, Bombay Municipal Corporation.
- 1977–1979 Member, 6th Lok Sabha.
- 1977–1978 Secretary, Janata Party Bombay.
- 1979 Member, Public accounts committee of Parliament.
- 1980–1984 Member, 7th Lok Sabha (2nd term).
- 1980 Member, Committee on Subordinate Legislation of Parliament.
