= Jayawantiben Mehta =

Indian politician (1938–2016)

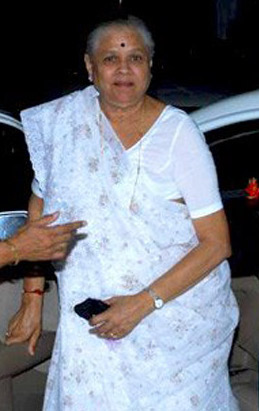
- Born: 20 December 1938; Aurangabad, Hyderabad State, British India Present Maharashtra
- Died: 7 November 2016 (aged 77); Mumbai, Maharashtra, India
- Occupation: Politician
- Spouse: Navinchandra Mehta
- Children: 1 son and 1 daughter

Jayawantiben Mehta (20 December 1938 – 7 November 2016) was an Indian politician. She was a member of the Bharatiya Janata Party (BJP).

She entered politics in 1962 and was elected as municipal councillor of Bombay Municipal Corporation in 1968. Subsequently, she was re-elected and served as municipal councillor for 10 years.

During the Emergency declared in 1975, she was imprisoned for 19 months. Jayawantiben was elected to the Maharashtra legislative assembly in 1978 and served 2 terms up to 1985 from Opera House constituency.

In 1980, she was made a member of the national executive of the BJP and in 1988, she was made the All India Secretary.

In 1989, she was first elected to the Lok Sabha. She was subsequently re-elected in 1996 and 1999 and was made a Minister of state for Power in the Vajpayee Government from 1999 to 2004.

Jayawantiben served as President of Mahila Morcha of BJP from 1991 to 1995 and as Vice President of Bharatiya Janata Party from 1993 to 1995.

She represented the Mumbai North East constituency in the 9th Lok Sabha in 1989 and Mumbai South constituency in the 11th and 13th Lok Sabha in 1996 and 1999.
