= Veerappa Moily =

Indian politician and writer

M. Veerappa Moily
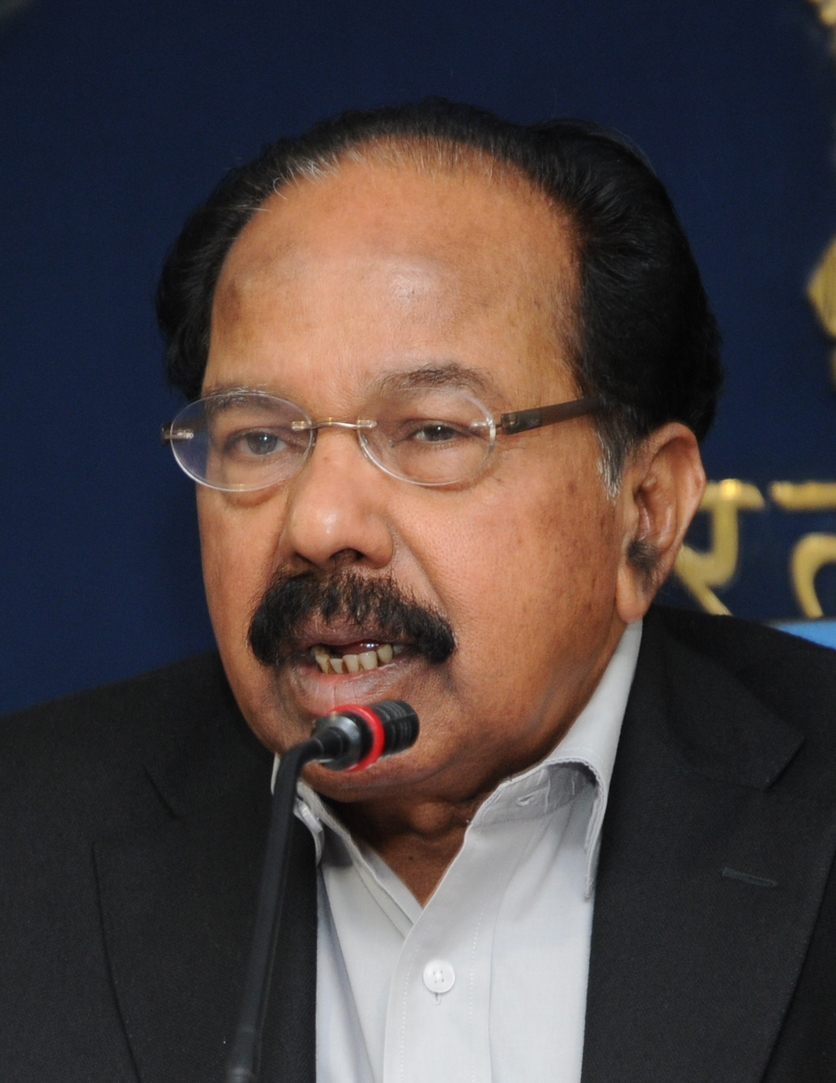

Minister of Environment and Forests
- In office 24 October 2013 – 26 May 2014
- Prime Minister: Manmohan Singh
- Preceded by: Jayanthi Natarajan
- Succeeded by: Prakash Javdekar

Minister of Petroleum and Natural Gas
- In office 28 October 2012 – 26 May 2014
- Prime Minister: Manmohan Singh
- Preceded by: Murli Deora
- Succeeded by: Dharmendra Pradhan

Minister of Corporate Affairs
- In office 13 July 2011 – 28 October 2012
- Prime Minister: Manmohan Singh
- Preceded by: Hansraj Bhardwaj
- Succeeded by: Sachin Pilot

Minister of Power
- In office 31 July 2012 – 28 October 2012
- Prime Minister: Manmohan Singh
- Preceded by: Sushilkumar Shinde
- Succeeded by: Jyotiraditya Madhavrao Scindia

Minister of Law and Justice
- In office 28 May 2009 – 28 May 2011
- Prime Minister: Manmohan Singh
- Preceded by: Hansraj Bhardwaj
- Succeeded by: Salman Khurshid

7th Chief Minister of Karnataka
- In office 19 November 1992 – 11 December 1994
- Preceded by: S. Bangarappa
- Succeeded by: H. D. Deve Gowda

Member of Parliament, Lok Sabha
- In office 16 May 2009 – 23 May 2019
- Preceded by: R. L. Jalappa
- Succeeded by: Bache Gowda
- Constituency: Chikballapur

Personal details
- Born: 12 January 1940 (age 86) Moodabidri, South Canara, British India (present Dakshina Kannada, Karnataka)
- Party: Indian National Congress
- Spouse: Malathi Moily
- Children: 4
- Education: Mangalore University; Bangalore University
- Website: Official Website

Marpadi Veerappa Moily (born 12 January 1940) is an Indian politician belonging to the Indian National Congress from the state of Karnataka. Moily was the former Chief Minister and the first ethnic Tuluva Chief Minister of the Indian state of Karnataka (19 November 1992 – 11 December 1994).

He was elected to Karnataka state legislative assembly from Karkala constituency of Udupi district. From 2009 to 2019, he represented the Chikballapur constituency in Lok Sabha. But he lost in 2019 to a BJP candidate when BJP won 25 seats out of 28 Lok Sabha seats in Karnataka. He was the former Minister of Petroleum and Natural Gas Minister of Corporate Affairs and Minister of Power in the Indian government.

He is also currently serving as the All India Congress Committee General Secretary in charge of Andhra Pradesh. He is regarded as one of the senior members of the Congress Party, and a close adviser for the Congress Leader Sonia Gandhi.

He announced formal retirement from electoral politics in 2024 prior to the 18th Lok Sabha Elections.

== Early life and education ==
Veerappa Moily was born in a Tulu-speaking family in Marpadi Village, Moodbidri erstwhile South Canara. He belongs to Devadiga community. He did his B.A. from Government College (now known as University College) situated at Hampankatta in Mangalore city. He completed his B.L. from University Law College, Bengaluru.

== Career ==
=== Legal career ===
Moily who is a lawyer by profession, in 2014, has opened a law firm called Moily Law Associates.

=== Political career ===
- The Prime Minister advised the President of India that M. Veerappa Moily, Minister of Petroleum & Natural Gas shall be given additional charge of the work of Ministry of Environment & Forests.
- 2012: Petroleum Minister w.e.f. 28.10.2012
- 2011–2012: Cabinet Minister of Corporate Affairs, Govt. of India
- 2009–2011: Cabinet Minister of Law and Justice, Govt. of India
- 2006–2009: Chairman of the Oversight Committee for implementation of 27 per cent reservation for OBCs in central educational institutions
- 2002–2004: Chairman, Revenue Reforms Commission
- 2005–2009: Chairman, 2nd Administrative Reform Commission.
- 2000–2002: Chairman, Tax Reforms Commission
- 1992–1994: Chief Minister of Karnataka
- 1989–1992: Minister for Law, Youth Service, Culture, Information, Parliamentary Affairs and Education, Govt. of Karnataka
- 1983–1985: Leader of Opposition, Karnataka Assembly
- 1980–1982: Minister for Finance and Planning, Govt. of Karnataka
- 1974–1977: Minister for Small Scale Industries, Govt. of Karnataka
- Appointed to various committees by Indira Gandhi one of which led to the setting up of National Bank for Agriculture and Rural Development (NABARD).
- Practiced law in the courts of Karkala, Mangalore, High Court in Bangalore and at the Supreme Court of India.
- Led the implementation of economic reforms in Karnataka in 1992 and also responsible for drafting & implementing the Karnataka Land Reforms Act in 1974.
- Led several projects, policies and achievements of the State of Karnataka in ministries and sectors such as Finance, Irrigation and Power, Urban Development and Infrastructure, Housing and Rural Development, Empowerment, Education and Culture.
- Author of epic poem Sri Ramayana Mahanveshanam in five volumes containing 42,295 lines in Kannada. It is also being translated into Hindi and being published by Indira Gandhi National Centre for Arts, New Delhi.
- Authored ‘Musings on India’ Part 1 & 2 in English containing articles on contemporary issues including public finance.
- Regular columnist for leading print publications and electronic media.
- Currently writing a book on the steps to be taken to make India an economic superpower by year 2020.

== Electoral History ==
=== Lok Sabha ===
Year	Constituency	Party	Votes	%	Opponent	Party	Votes	%	Result	Margin	%
2019	Chikkballapur	INC	5,63,802	40.62	B. N. Bache Gowda	BJP	7,45,912	53.74	Lost	-1,82,110	-13.12
2014	Chikkballapur	INC	4,24,800	33.61	B. N. Bache Gowda	BJP	4,15,280	32.86	Won	+9,520	+0.75
2009	Chikkballapur	INC	3,90,500	39.90	C. Aswathanarayana	BJP	3,39,119	34.65	Won	+51,381	+5.25
2004	Mangalore	INC	3,51,345	44.38	D. V. Sadananda Gowda	BJP	3,84,760	48.61	Lost	-33,415	-4.23
1999	Mangalore	INC	3,45,067	47.95	V. Dhananjaya Kumar	BJP	3,53,536	49.13	Lost	-8,469	-1.18
1998	Chikmagalur	INC	2,63,641	36.69	D. C. Sreekantappa	BJP	3,16,137	44.00	Lost	-52,496	-7.31

== Summary of achievements ==
=== Chairman of Tax Reforms Commission ===
- Formulated a systematic reform of the tax system resulting in improved revenue productivity and competitiveness of the State of Karnataka.
- Karnataka Chief Minister SM Krishna, implemented 80% of the recommending from the commission resulting in tax revenues increases of Rs. 2200 crores in 2003–04 from recommendations of the commission. Tax exemption

=== Chairman of Revenue Reforms Commission ===
- Report submitted during November 2003 recommending reforms in Irrigation, Health, Education and Forest Departments
- Revenue increases of Rs. 1800 crores from the commission's recommendations.

=== Finance ===
- Presented the Karnataka State Budgets for 1992–93, 1993–94, 1994–95, 1980–81, 1981–82 & 1982–83.
- Set records of revenue surplus during every stint as Finance Minister.

=== Irrigation and Power ===
- Led unprecedented and huge outlays in irrigation works and helped maximize the irrigation potential of Karnataka.
- Developed innovative financing schemes such as Irrigation bonds which were appreciated by the Reserve Bank of India and the World Bank.
- Cleared and conceived massive works on the power generation and power distribution system in Karnataka that substantially reduced the power shortage position in Karnataka.
- Established Krishna Jalabhagya Nigam scheme which mobilised Rs. 13,000 crores for irrigation projects.

=== Rural and Urban Development and Infrastructure ===
- Formulated and implemented various drinking water schemes and employment guarantee schemes and housing schemes.
- Established the Karnataka Urban Infrastructure Development and Finance to formulate and appraise infrastructure development projects, mobilization of funds from different sources, implementation of urban infrastructure projects, and capacity building/training on urban development issues.
- Initiated various projects such as the International Airport in Bangalore, International Convention Centre, Konkan Railway, and National Games in Bangalore.
- Sanctioned and implemented the Rs. 1200 crores ADB aid programme for the coastal region of Karnataka.

=== Education ===
- Chief Architect of the new Common Entrance Test (CET) system launching an admission policy for technical education founded on merit, transparency and social justice.
- Established the nation's leading law institute, The National Law School University.
- Executed the Total Literacy Programme in the State of Karnataka.
- Worked with the World Bank to execute Universalisation of Primary Education.
- Oversaw the reform in University Education in Karnataka. He established six universities such as Kannada University, Rajiv Gandhi Medical University, Visweshwariah Technical University, Karnataka Open University, Mangalore University and Gulbarga University.

== Publications ==
Moily has written a book The edge of time. It is a Kannada novel Tembare which examines, a complex cultural practice of coastal Karnataka, called bhutaradhane, or the worship of hero-spirits. The Pambada community, a marginalised dalit community, has as its hereditary profession, spirit impersonation during elaborate rituals. Mr. Moily explored two responses to this traditional and exploitative profession through two Pambada brothers: one who rebels and opts for formal education, and the other who tries to revive the true spirit of the ancient practice. (courtesy : Prasanta Varma, Advocate, Supreme Court of India). Mr. Moily is an advocate by profession, he entered politics about four decades ago and he became the chief minister of Karnataka in the year 1992.

Moily is a literary figure of some note. He has served as a regular columnist for The Hindu and Deccan Herald (both English newspapers) and for Samyukta Karnataka, a Kannada daily. He has also authored several books, all in Kannada, being:

- Thembare: A novel and perhaps his most critically acclaimed work, it has been translated into English under the title "The edge of time."
- Kotta: Another novel, made into telefilms in both Kannada and Hindi, directed by M.S. Sathyu.
- Suligali ("Typhoon"), a novel. It was adapted into a film titled, Premave Balina Belaku (1984)
- Sagaradeepa: "Ocean lamp." A novel.
- Milana: A play.
- Parajitha: A play.
- Premavendare: A play.
- Halu-Jenu Maththe: An anthology of poems.
- Nadeyali Samara: An anthology of poems.
- Yakshaprashne: An anthology of poems.
- Sri Ramayana Mahanveshanam: This poem will be published in five volumes, the first four of which have already been released between February 2001 and March 2004. Originally published in Kannada, the epic poem is now being translated into Hindi.
- Musings on India: A collection of his newspaper articles, Sapna Publications and Full Circle, New Delhi, 2001

Moily has written four volumes of an English book called Unleashing India, which outlines how India can be a super power after 25 to 30 years by leveraging and properly utilising its demographic dividend. The early three volumes of the book dealt with the following: one on agriculture, second on water and third on power sector. The fourth volume, "Unleashing India: The Fire of Knowledge" – which illustrates a detailed analysis of the deficiencies in the Indian education system, along with innovative strategies and solutions to address the educational needs of the country in the 21st century – was published on 29 March 2012.

Moily is also writing another epic poem on Draupadi and the title is Shrimudi Parikranam. In an interview to Bar & Bench he said "This is how I go on writing, it is an unstoppable journey".

== Controversies ==
- After taking charge of Ministry of Environment and Forests he gave nod to many polluting industries in ecological sensitive areas.
- A case has been registered against Veerappa Moily and others saying that they favoured RIL in fixing price for Natural gas.

== Awards ==
- 2000 – Ameen Sadbhavana Award
- 2001 – Devaraj Urs Prashasthi
- 2001 – Aryabhatta award
- 2007 – Moortidevi Award for Shri Ramayana Mahanveshanam
- 2014 – Saraswati Samman for Shri Ramayana Mahanveshanam
- 2021 – Sahitya Akademi Award for the epic Sri Bahubali Ahimsadigvijayam

Lok Sabha
Preceded by R. L. Jalappa	Member of Parliament for Chikballapur; 2009–2019	Succeeded by B. N. Bache Gowda
Political offices
Preceded by S. Bangarappa	Chief Minister of Karnataka; 1992–1994	Succeeded by H. D. Deve Gowda
Preceded by Hansraj Bhardwaj	Minister of Law and Justice; 31 May 2009 – 19 July 2011	Succeeded by Salman Khurshid
Preceded by Hansraj Bhardwaj	Minister of Corporate Affairs; 13 July 2011 – 28 October 2012	Succeeded by Sachin Pilot
Preceded by Sushilkumar Shinde	Minister of Power; 31 July 2012 – 28 October 2012	Succeeded by Jyotiraditya Scindia; Minister of State (Independent Charge)
Preceded by Jaipal Reddy	Minister of Petroleum and Natural Gas; 28 October 2012 – 26 May 2014	Succeeded by Dharmendra Pradhan
Preceded by Jayanthi Natarajan	Minister of Environment, Forest and Climate Change; 24 December 2013 – 26 May 2014	Succeeded by Prakash Javadekar
