= List of speakers of the Maharashtra Legislative Assembly =

Presiding officer of MH legislative assembly

Speaker of the Maharashtra Legislative Assembly
- Seal of the state of Maharashtra

- Flag of India

- Incumbent; Rahul Narwekar since 9 December 2024
- Maharashtra Legislative Assembly
- Style: The Hon’ble (formal); Mr. Speaker (informal)
- Member of: Maharashtra Legislative Assembly
- Reports to: Government of Maharashtra
- Residence: Mumbai
- Seat: Maharashtra Legislature
- Appointer: Members of the Maharashtra Legislative Assembly
- Term length: During the life of the vidhan Sabha (five years maximum)
- Constituting instrument: Article 93 of the Constitution of India
- Precursor: Rahul Narwekar, BJP) (2022-24)
- Inaugural holder: Ganesh Vasudev Mavalankar, INC (Pre-Independence Bombay Legislative Assembly) (21 July 1937 - 20 January 1946); Kundanmal Sobhachand Firodia, INC (Post-Independence Bombay Legislative Assembly) (15 August 1947 - 31 January 1952); S. L. Silam, INC (Maharashtra Legislative Assembly) (1 May 1960 - 12 March 1962)
- Formation: 01 May 1960
- Salary: ₹ - approximately

The Speaker of the Maharashtra Legislative Assembly is the presiding officer of the Legislative Assembly of Maharashtra, the main law-making body for the Indian state of Maharashtra. The Speaker is elected in the very first meeting of the Maharashtra Legislative Assembly after the general elections for a term of 5 years from amongst the members of the assembly. The Speaker holds office until ceasing to be a member of the assembly or resignation from the office. The Speaker can be removed from office by a resolution passed in the assembly by an effective majority of its members. In the absence of Speaker, the meeting of Maharashtra Legislative Assembly is presided by the Deputy Speaker.

== Eligibility ==
The Speaker of the Assembly:

1. Must be a citizen of India;
2. Must not be less than 25 years of age; and
3. Should not hold any office of profit under the Government of Maharashtra.

== Powers and functions of the speaker ==
The speaker of the legislative assembly conducts the business in house, and decides whether a bill is a money bill or not. They maintain discipline and decorum in the house and can punish a member for their unruly behaviour by suspending them. They also permit the moving of various kinds of motions and resolutions such as a motion of no confidence, motion of adjournment, motion of censure and calling attention notice as per the rules. The speaker decides on the agenda to be taken up for discussion during the meeting. The date of election of the speaker is fixed by the Governor of Maharashtra. Further, all comments and speeches made by members of the House are addressed to the speaker. The speaker is answerable to the house. Both the speaker and deputy speaker may be removed by a resolution passed by the majority of the members.

== List of Speakers ==
The Assembly is headed by a Speaker, elected by members in a simple majority vote. The following is the list of speakers of the Assembly.

#	Portrait	Name	Constituency	Tenure			Assembly (election)	Party
Pre-Independence Bombay Legislative Assembly (1937–47)
1		Ganesh Vasudev Mavalankar	Ahmedabad City, Urban	21 July 1937	20 January 1946		1937	Indian National Congress
2		Kundanmal Sobhachand Firodia		21 May 1946	14 August 1947		1946	Indian National Congress
Post-Independence Bombay Legislative Assembly (1947–60)
(2)		Kundanmal Sobhachand Firodia		15 August 1947	31 January 1952		1946	Indian National Congress
3		Dattatraya Kashinath Kunte	Alibag	5 May 1952	31 October 1956		1st (1952)	Indian National Congress
4		S. L. Silam	Tank Pakhadi Byculla West Kalachowki West	21 November 1956	30 April 1960		1st (1952)	Indian National Congress
4		S. L. Silam	Walkeshwar	21 November 1956	30 April 1960		2nd (1957)	Indian National Congress
Maharashtra Legislative Assembly (since 1960)
1		S. L. Silam	Walkeshwar	1 May 1960	12 March 1962	1 year, 315 days	1st (1957)	Indian National Congress
2		Balasaheb Bharde	Ahmednagar South	17 March 1962	13 March 1967	9 years, 362 days	2nd (1962)	Indian National Congress
2		Balasaheb Bharde	Pathardi	15 March 1967	15 March 1972	9 years, 362 days	3rd (1967)	Indian National Congress
3		S. K. Wankhede	Kalmeshwar	22 March 1972	20 April 1977	5 years, 29 days	4th (1972)	Indian National Congress
4		Balasaheb Desai	Patan	4 July 1977	13 March 1978	252 days	4th (1972)	Indian National Congress
5		Shivraj Patil	Latur	17 March 1978	6 December 1979	1 year, 264 days	5th (1978)	Indian National Congress
6		Pranlal Vora	Vile Parle	1 February 1980	29 June 1980	149 days	5th (1978)	Indian National Congress
7		Sharad Dighe	Worli	2 July 1980	11 January 1985	4 years, 193 days	6th (1980)	Indian National Congress
8		Shankarrao Jagtap	Koregaon	20 March 1985	19 March 1990	4 years, 364 days	7th (1985)	Indian National Congress
9		Madhukarrao Chaudhari	Raver	21 March 1990	22 March 1995	5 years, 1 day	8th (1990)	Indian National Congress
10		Dattaji Nalawade	Worli	24 March 1995	19 October 1999	4 years, 209 days	9th (1995)	Shiv Sena
11		Arun Gujarathi	Chopda	22 October 1999	17 October 2004	4 years, 361 days	10th (1999)	Nationalist Congress Party
12		Babasaheb Kupekar	Gadhinglaj	6 November 2004	3 November 2009	4 years, 362 days	11th (2004)	Nationalist Congress Party
13		Dilip Walse-Patil	Ambegaon	11 November 2009	8 November 2014	4 years, 362 days	12th (2009)	Nationalist Congress Party
14		Haribhau Bagade	Phulambri	12 November 2014	25 November 2019	5 years, 13 days	13th (2014)	Bharatiya Janata Party
15		Nana Patole	Sakoli	1 December 2019	4 February 2021	1 year, 65 days	14th (2019)	Indian National Congress
(Note: Acting)		Narhari Zirwal	Dindori	4 February 2021	3 July 2022	1 year, 149 days	14th (2019)	Nationalist Congress Party
16		Rahul Narwekar	Colaba	3 July 2022	6 December 2024	4 years, 63 days	14th (2019)	Bharatiya Janata Party
16		Rahul Narwekar	Colaba	9 December 2024	Incumbent	4 years, 63 days	15th (2024)	Bharatiya Janata Party

== List of deputy speakers ==
Sr No	Deputy Speaker	Party	Tenure		Duration
Pre-Independence Bombay Legislative Assembly (1937–47)
1	Narayan Gururao Joshi	Congress	1937	1939	2 years
2	Shanmugappa Ningappa Angadi	Congress	1946	1946	1 year
Post-Independence Bombay Legislative Assembly (1947–60)
(2)	Shanmugappa Ningappa Angadi	Congress	1947	1952	5 years
3	S. R. Kanthi	Congress	5 May 1952	31 October 1956	4 years, 179 days
4	S. K. Wankhede	Congress	23 November 1956	5 April 1957	133 days
5	Deendayal Gupta	Congress	20 June 1957	30 April 1960	2 years, 315 days
Maharashtra Legislative Assembly (Commenced 1960)
1	Deendayal Gupta	Congress	1 May 1960	3 March 1962	1 year, 306 days
2	Krishnarao Girme	Congress	20 March 1962	13 March 1972	9 years, 359 days
3	Ramkrishna Pant Bet	Congress	23 March 1972	26 February 1976	3 years, 340 days
4	S. F. P. S. M. Pasha	Congress	12 March 1976	20 April 1977	1 year, 39 days
5	Shivraj Patil	Congress	5 July 1977	2 March 1978	240 days
6	Gajananrao Raghunathrao Garud	Independent	21 March 1978	5 April 1979	1 year, 15 days
7	Suryakant Dongre	RPK	7 April 1979	9 June 1980	1 year, 63 days
8	Shankarrao Jagtap	Congress (U)	3 July 1980	8 March 1985	4 years, 248 days
9	Kamalkishor Kadam	Congress (S)	21 March 1985	22 June 1986	1 year, 93 days
10	Padamsinh Bajirao Patil	Congress (S)	24 June 1986	25 June 1988	2 years, 1 day
11	Babanrao Dhakne	JNP	30 July 1988	9 December 1989	1 year, 132 days
12	Moreshwar Temurde	JD	19 July 1991	11 March 1995	3 years, 235 days
13	Sharad Motiram Tasare	Congress	28 March 1995	15 July 1999	4 years, 109 days
14	Pramod Bhaurao Shende	Congress	23 December 1999	3 November 2009	9 years, 315 days
15	Madhukarrao Chavan	Congress	10 December 2009	18 November 2010	343 days
16	Vasant Chinduji Purke	Congress	4 December 2010	8 November 2014	3 years, 340 days
17	Vijayrao Bhaskarrao Auti	Shiv Sena	30 November 2018	9 November 2019	344 days
18	Narhari Sitaram Zirwal	NCP	14 March 2020	26 November 2024	4 years, 257 days
19	Anna Bansode	NCP	25 March 2025	Incumbent	1 year, 166 days

== Pro tem Speaker ==
Jeeva Pandu Gavit 2014 Kalidas Kolambkar 2019 2024

== See also ==
- List of governors of Maharashtra
- List of chief ministers of Maharashtra
- List of deputy speakers of the Maharashtra Legislative Assembly
