= Ajay Choudhari =

Indian politician

Deputy Leader of the Opposition (Maharashtra Legislative Assembly)
- In office 3 August 2023 – 23 November 2024 Serving with Jitendra Awhad
- Governor: Ramesh Bais
- Chief Minister: Eknath Shinde
- Deputy CM: Devendra Fadnavis (First); Ajit Pawar (Second)
- Leader of the Opposition: Vijay Namdevrao Wadettiwar
- Speaker of the House: Rahul Narwekar
- Preceded by: Balasaheb Thorat
- Succeeded by: Vacant (Note: No leader of opposition because no political party obtained at least 10% of the seats in the assembly.)

Leader of Shiv Sena (UBT) Legislative Party Maharashtra Legislature
- In office 24 June 2022 – 24 November 2024
- National President Shiv Sena (UBT): Uddhav Thackeray
- Preceded by: Eknath Shinde
- Succeeded by: Aditya Thackeray
- Parliamentary group: Shiv Sena (Uddhav Balasaheb Thackeray)

Member of the Maharashtra Legislative Assembly
- Incumbent
- Assumed office October 2014
- Preceded by: Bala Nandgaonkar
- Constituency: Shivadi

Personal details
- Party: Shiv Sena(UBT)

Ajay Choudhari is an Indian politician who served as the Shiv Sena Legislative Party leader and politician from Mumbai, Maharashtra. He was a Member of the Legislative Assembly from Shivadi Vidhan Sabha constituency of Mumbai, Maharashtra, India as a member of Shiv Sena.

== Positions held ==
- 2014: Elected to Maharashtra Legislative Assembly
- 2015: Shiv Sena Sampark Pramukh Nashik
- 2019: Re-Elected to Maharashtra Legislative Assembly
- 2022: Elected as Shiv Sena Legislative Party Leader
- 2024: Re-Elected to Maharashtra Legislative Assembly

== See also ==
- Mumbai South Lok Sabha constituency
