= Sachin Ahir =

Indian politician

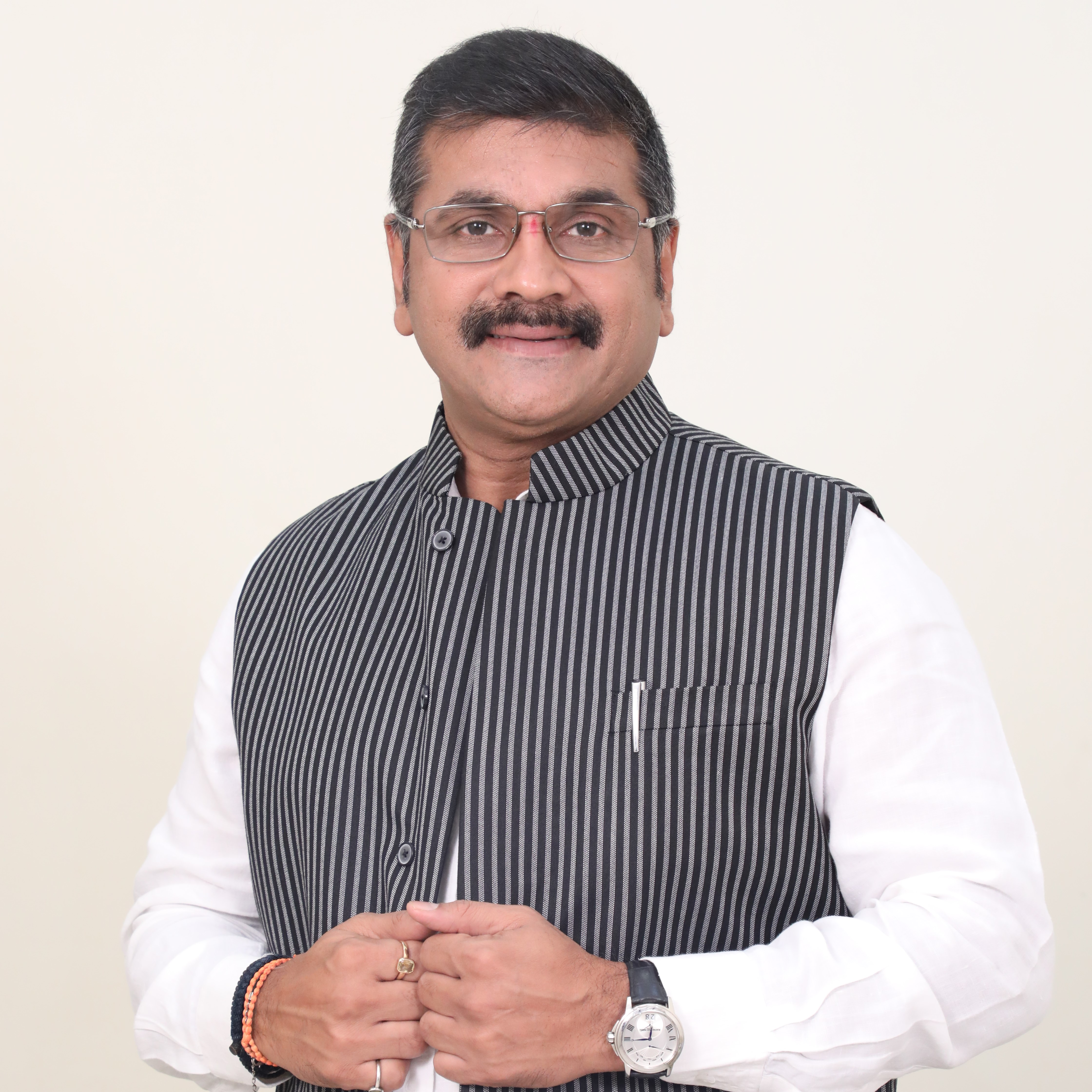

3rd Deputy Chairperson of the Maharashtra Legislative Council
- Incumbent
- Assumed office 1 July 2026
- Governor: Jishnu Dev Varma
- Chairperson: Ram Shinde
- Preceded by: Neelam Gorhe
- Constituency: Elected by MLA's

Member of Maharashtra Legislative Council
- Incumbent
- Assumed office July 2022
- Preceded by: Sujitsingh Thakur
- Constituency: Elected by MLA's

Minister of State Government of Maharashtra
- In office 11 June 2013 – 26 September 2014
- Ministry&Departments: Housing; Slum Improvement; House Repairs; Re-Construction; Urban Land Ceiling; Industries; Mines; Social Justice; De-addiction Activities; Environment; Tribal Development; Nomadic Tribes; Other Backward Bahujan Welfare
- Chief Minister: Prithviraj Chavan
- In office 7 November 2009 – 10 November 2010
- Ministry&Departments: Housing; Slum Improvement; Repairs and Reconstruction; Urban Land Ceiling; Industries; Mines; Social Justice; De-Addiction Activities; Environment
- Chief Minister: Ashok Chavan

Member of Maharashtra Legislative Assembly
- In office 22 October 2009 – 19 October 2014
- Preceded by: Dattaji Nalawade
- Succeeded by: Sunil Shinde
- Constituency: Worli
- In office 1999–2009
- Preceded by: Datta Rane
- Succeeded by: Bala Nandgaonkar
- Constituency: Shivadi

Personal details
- Born: 21 March 1972 (age 54) Mumbai, India
- Party: Shiv Sena (2026-Present), (2019-2022)
- Other political affiliations: Shiv Sena(UBT) (2022-2026); Nationalist Congress Party(1999-2019)
- Spouse: Sangeeta Ahir
- Relatives: Arun Gawli (uncle)

Sachin Mohan Ahir (Marathi: सचिन अहिर) (born 21 March 1972 in Mumbai, India) is an Indian politician from Mumbai, Maharashtra and Deputy Leader of the Shiv Sena. He is currently a member of Maharashtra Legislative Council. He was Member of the Legislative Assembly from Worli Assembly constituency.

== Community service ==
Sachin and his wife have established the Shree Sankalp Pratishthan charitable trust. The trust has been involved in organisation of the Worli Festival and Dahi Handi events during the festival of Govinda.

== Positions held ==
- 1999: Elected to Maharashtra Legislative Assembly (1st term)
- 2004: Re-Elected to Maharashtra Legislative Assembly (2nd term)
- 2009: Re-Elected to Maharashtra Legislative Assembly (3rd term)
- 2009: Appointed Minister of State for Housing in Maharashtra Government
- 2020 : Appointed Deputy Leader of Shiv Sena
- 2022: Elected to Maharashtra Legislative Council (1st term)
- 2026 : Deputy Chairman of Maharashtra legislative council

== With Trade Union ==
Sachin Ahir began his work with the Rashtriya Mill Mazdoor Sangh in 1993. After holding the post of Secretary, he was eventually elected as the President of this union. He has also been at the helm of the Maharashtra Rajya Rashtriya Kamgar Sangh since 1996. He also led the Mazagaon Dock, Mahindra and Mahindra Union, etc. He has influenced the labour movement by carrying out agreements for increment in salaries of the workers in all these industries.
