= Jitendra Awhad =

Acting Leader of the Opposition Maharashtra Legislative Assembly

Deputy Leader of the Opposition Maharashtra Legislative Assembly
- In office 3 August 2023 – 26 November 2024 Serving with Ajay Choudhari
- Governor: Ramesh Bais
- Chief Minister: Devendra Fadnavis
- Deputy CM: Eknath Shinde (First); Ajit Pawar (Second)
- Leader of the Opposition: Ajit Pawar *Vijay Namdevrao Wadettiwar
- Speaker of the House: Rahul Narwekar
- Preceded by: Balasaheb Thorat
- Succeeded by: Vacant (Note: No leader of opposition because no political party obtained at least 10% of the seats in the assembly.)

Leader of the Opposition (Maharashtra Legislative Assembly)
- Acting
- In office 2 July 2023 – 18 July 2023
- Governor: Ramesh Bais
- Deputy: Balasaheb Thorat
- Chief Minister: Eknath Shinde
- Deputy CM: Devendra Fadnavis (First); Ajit Pawar (Second)
- Speaker of the House: Rahul Narwekar
- Preceded by: Ajit Pawar
- Succeeded by: Balasaheb Thorat (additional charge) Vijay Namdevrao Wadettiwar

Cabinet Minister Government of Maharashtra
- In office 30 December 2019 – 29 June 2022
- Minister: Housing; Minority Development and Aukaf (on 27 March 2022)
- Governor: Bhagat Singh Koshyari
- Chief Minister: Uddhav Thackeray
- Deputy CM: Ajit Pawar
- Preceded by: Nawab Malik
- Succeeded by: Eknath Shinde CM (Minority Development and Aukaf); Devendra Fadnavis DCM (Housing)

Cabinet Minister Government of Maharashtra
- In office 29 May 2014 – 26 September 2014
- Minister: Medical Education; Horticulture; Employment Guarantee
- Governor: Om Prakash Kohli (additional charge); C. Vidyasagar Rao
- Chief Minister: Prithviraj Chavan
- Preceded by: Vijaykumar Gavit
- Succeeded by: Girish Mahajan (Medical Education); Girish Bapat (Horticulture & Employment Generation)

Member of Maharashtra Legislative Assembly
- Incumbent
- Assumed office 22 October 2009
- Preceded by: Constituency Established
- Constituency: Mumbra-Kalwa

Member of Maharashtra Legislative Council
- In office (2002–2008)

Personal details
- Born: Jitendra Satish Awhad; 5 August 1963 (age 63) Nashik, Maharashtra, India
- Party: Nationalist Congress Party (Sharadchandra Pawar) (2024-present)
- Spouse: Ruta Awhad
- Children: Natasha Awhad
- Parent: Satish Awhad (Father)
- Education: Mumbai University
- Occupation: Politician

Jitendra Satish Awhad is a senior leader and Indian politician from Maharashtra. Previously he served as a member of legislative council of Maharashtra from 2002 to 2009. He also served as the Deputy Leader of the Opposition Maharashtra Legislative Assembly with Ajay Choudhari in 2024 and currently a Member of the Maharashtra Legislative Assembly for 3 terms representing Mumbra-Kalwa in Thane. He has previously served as the Acting Leader of the Opposition Maharashtra Legislative Assembly and he has previously served as Cabinet Minister of Medical Education and Horticulture in 2014 and Housing and Minority Affairs from 2019 to 2022. He belongs to the Nationalist Congress Party.

== Early life and education ==
Jitendra Awhad was born to Lilavati and Satish Awhad. He went to St. John the Baptist High School, Thane. In 1981 he enrolled in B.N Bandodkar College as a science graduate. While in college, he was chosen as Gymkhana Secretary, and further went on to become the secretary of the All-India Students' Organization, a non-political outfit. Awhad started standing up for social causes early on launching a campaign against rising tuition fees in Mumbai University in 1982. After completing his Marine Engineering Studies in 1984–85, he undertook a post graduate degree in personnel management from Mumbai University. Awhad also holds a Doctorate from Mumbai University, the thesis being "The History of Socio-Religious Movement in Maharashtra, a Sub-Alternate View".

== Personal life ==
Awhad believes that Sanatan Dharma is not Hinduism and he asks everyone to maintain the secular nature of India.

== Formation of Nationalist Congress Party ==
In 1999, after the 12th Lok Sabha was dissolved and elections to the 13th Lok Sabha were called, Sharad Pawar, P. A. Sangma, and Tariq Anwar demanded that the party needed to propose someone native-born as the prime ministerial candidate and not the Italian-born Sonia Gandhi, who had entered party politics and replaced Sitaram Kesri as Congress president. In response, the Congress Working Committee (CWC) expelled the trio for six years from the party.

In response Pawar and Sangma along with Tariq Anwar founded the Nationalist Congress Party in June 1999. Despite the falling out, the new party aligned with the Congress party to form a coalition government in Maharashtra after the 1999 Maharashtra Legislative Assembly election to prevent the Shiv Sena-BJP combine from returning to power.

== In politics ==
After the formation of the Nationalist Congress Party (NCP), Awhad was elected as the first National President of Youth NCP in 1999. From here he entered mainstream politics and was elected as MLC in 2002. He was re-elected as an MLC in March 2008 for a five-year term. In 2009 he contested his first ever elections and secured victory with a considerable margin from the Mumbra-Kalwa (Vidhan Sabha constituency).

In May 2014 he was inducted into the Prithviraj Chavan ministry as the Minister of Medical Education, Horticulture, Employment Guarantee. As Minister of Horticulture of Maharashtra state, Dr. Jitendra Awhad gained popularity when he proposed Amitabh Bachchan's name for being the brand ambassador for the state horticulture; encourage farmers, promote their produce and ensure quality for consumers. In July 2014 Amitabh Bachchan was appointed Maharashtra's horticulture brand ambassador.

Dr. Jitendra Awhad started an initiative called “Coffee with Students” to connect and resolve issues of medical students across the state. In the first month alone, cities like Mumbai, Thane, Pune, Aurangabad, Kolhapur, Nagpur, Dhule, Solapur have been covered and effective measures have been taken to improve the situations for students and staff.

In 2019 he was inducted into the Thackeray ministry as the Minister of Housing. In March 2022 after the departure of Nawab Malik from the cabinet, Awhad was appointed the Minister of Minority Development & Aukaf.

Amid the 2023 Political Crisis in The Nationalist Congress Party, Awhad was appointed Leader of Opposition in Maharashtra legislative assembly and Chief party whip post Ajit Pawar's resignation and appointment as Deputy Chief Minister of Maharashtra.

=== Electoral history ===
Election candidature history
Election	Year	Party	Constituency	Opponent		Result	Margin
Assembly	2009	NCP	Mumbra-Kalwa	SS	Rajan Kine	Won	15,689
Assembly	2014	NCP	Mumbra-Kalwa	SS	Dashrath Patil	Won	47,683
Assembly	2019	NCP	Mumbra-Kalwa	BJP	Deepali Jahangir Sayed	Won	75,639
Assembly	2024	NCP-SP	Mumbra-Kalwa	NCP	Najeeb Mulla	Won	96,228

== Controversies ==
Dr. Jitendra Awhad being a public figure has also been subject of few controversial incidents. He was accused of assaulting a civil engineer named Anant Karmuse on 5 April 2020. Dr. Awhad has also been booked for allegedly insulting remarks on the Sindhi Community during a party function in Ulhasnagar on 27 May 2020.
