= Nalawade =

Nalawade may refer to:

- Arun Nalawade, an Indian film and theater producer
- Dattaji Nalawade, Indian politician
