= S. K. Wankhede =

Indian politician

Barrister Sheshrao Wankhede

18th President of the Board of Control for Cricket in India
- In office 1980–1982
- Preceded by: M. Chinnaswamy
- Succeeded by: N. K. P. Salve

Speaker of the Maharashtra Legislative Assembly
- In office 22 March 1972 – 20 April 1977
- Preceded by: Balasaheb Bharde
- Succeeded by: Balasaheb Desai

Minister of Finance, Maharashtra
- In office 5 December 1963 – 1 March 1967
- Chief Minister: Vasantrao Naik
- Preceded by: P. K. Sawant
- Succeeded by: Shankarrao Chavan
- In office 1 May 1960 – 8 March 1962
- Chief Minister: Yashwantrao Chavan
- Succeeded by: Sadashiv Barve

Member of the Maharashtra Legislative Assembly
- In office 1960–1978
- Preceded by: Himself
- Succeeded by: Bhagwantrao Manikrao Gaikwad
- Constituency: Kalmeshwar

Deputy Speaker of the Bombay Legislative Assembly
- In office 23 November 1956 – 5 April 1957
- Preceded by: S. R. Kanthi
- Succeeded by: Deendayal Gupta
- Constituency: Sawargaon

Member of the Bombay Legislative Assembly
- In office 1957–1960
- Preceded by: Constituency established
- Succeeded by: Himself
- Constituency: Kalmeshwar
- In office 1956–1957
- Preceded by: Himself in MP LA
- Succeeded by: Constituency abolished
- Constituency: Sawargaon

Member of the Madhya Pradesh Legislative Assembly
- In office 1952–1956
- Preceded by: Office established
- Succeeded by: Himself in Bombay LA
- Constituency: Sawargaon

Personal details
- Born: 24 September 1914 Katol, Central Provinces and Berar, British India (present-day Maharashtra, India)
- Died: 30 January 1988 (aged 73) Bombay, Maharashtra, India
- Occupation: Lawyer, Politician

Sheshrao Krishnarao Wankhede (24 September 1914 – 30 January 1988) was a cricket administrator and politician.

== Early life ==
Wankhede had his early college education in Nagpur and entered the bar in England. On his return, he started practice in Nagpur. In the 1940s, he entered politics and was jailed for taking part in the Indian freedom struggle.

== Political career ==
He was elected to the Madhya Pradesh assembly in 1952 and served as the deputy speaker of Bilingual Bombay from 23 November 1956 to 5 April 1957. He was elected from Kalmeshwar in 1957 elections to the Bombay Assembly and in 1962 and 1967 to the Maharashtra Assembly. He was the Speaker of the Maharashtra Legislative Assembly between 22 March 1972 till 20 April 1977. Wankhede was also the mayor of Nagpur for three years. In 1967, he was a member of the Indian delegation that took part in the 22nd session of the United Nations General Assembly in New York City.

== As cricket administrator ==
Wankhede was the President of the Board of Control for Cricket in India from 1980–81 to 1982–83, and the vice-president from 1972–73 to 1979–80. He led the Bombay Cricket Association from 1963 to 1964 till his death. He also chaired various other sporting bodies. He was an agriculturist and businessman by profession.

The Bombay Cricket Association (BCA) had persistent disputes with the Cricket Club of India over ticketing revenues from Brabourne Stadium, which is owned by CCI. After a particularly bitter dispute in the early 1970s, the BCA decided to build a stadium of its own in Mumbai. Built under his leadership, it is now named after him as Wankhede Stadium, and is a prominent international cricketing venue.

== In popular culture ==
It is told that Mr. Wankhede went to watch the India vs Zimbabwe match of the 1983 Cricket World Cup at Tunbridge Wells. Seeing India at 17 for 5, Wankhede asked his Indian taxi driver to keep the meter running. Later, after Kapil Dev's onslaught of unbeaten 175, a world record then, and India defeating Zimbabwe, it is said that Wankhede paid 300 pounds for that taxi ride. This has been captured in The 83 Movie starring Ranveer Singh.
