= Shivadi Assembly constituency =

Constituency of the Maharashtra legislative assembly in India

Coordinates: 20°07′12.28″N 74°07′24.42″E

Shivadi
- Constituency No. 183 for the Maharashtra Legislative Assembly

Constituency details
- Country: India
- Region: Western India
- State: Maharashtra
- District: Mumbai City
- Lok Sabha constituency: Mumbai South
- Established: 1978
- Total electors: 275,482
- Reservation: None

Member of Legislative Assembly
- 15th Maharashtra Legislative Assembly
- Incumbent Ajay Choudhari
- Party: SS(UBT)
- Alliance: MVA
- Elected year: 2024

Shivadi Assembly constituency is one of the 288 Vidhan Sabha (Assembly) constituencies of Maharashtra state in Western India.

== Demographics ==
Shivadi (constituency number 183) is one of the 10 Vidhan Sabha constituencies located in the Mumbai City district. Number of electorates in 2009 was 268,072 (male 151,641, female 116,431) 42,182 are from minority community.

It is a part of Mumbai South Lok Sabha constituency along with five other assembly constituencies, viz Worli, Byculla, Malabar Hill, Mumbadevi and Colaba.

== Members of the Legislative Assembly ==
Year	Member	Party
1951-1978: Constituency did not exist
1978	Devidas Kamble	Independent
1980	Bhaurao Patil	Indian National Congress
1985	Dadu Atyalkar	Independent
1990	Datta Rane	Bharatiya Janata Party
1995	Datta Rane	Bharatiya Janata Party
1999	Sachin Ahir	Nationalist Congress Party
2004	Sachin Ahir	Nationalist Congress Party
Major boundary changes
2009	Bala Nandgaonkar	Maharashtra Navnirman Sena
2014	Ajay Choudhari	Shiv Sena
2019	Ajay Choudhari	Shiv Sena
2024	Ajay Choudhari	Shiv Sena (UBT)

== Election results ==
=== Assembly Election 2024 ===
2024 Maharashtra Legislative Assembly election : Shivadi
Party	Candidate	Votes	%	±%
SS(UBT)	Ajay Vinayak Choudhari	74,890	49.52	New
MNS	Bala Nandgaonkar	67,750	44.80	▲15.60
Independent	Sanjay Nana Gajanan Ambole	5,925	3.92	New
NOTA	None of the Above	2,460	1.63	▼1.65
VBA	Milind Deorao Kamble	1,021	0.68	New
Margin of victory		7,140	4.72	▼25.23
Turnout		153,703	55.79	▲7.13
Total valid votes		151,243		
Registered electors		275,482		
SS(UBT) gain from SS		Swing	▼9.63	

=== Assembly Election 2019 ===
2019 Maharashtra Legislative Assembly election : Shivadi
Party	Candidate	Votes	%	±%
SS	Ajay Vinayak Choudhari	77,687	59.14	▲9.26
MNS	Santosh Raghunath Nalawade	38,350	29.20	▲8.16
INC	Uday Vitthal Phansekar	13,368	10.18	▲1.41
NOTA	None of the Above	4,308	3.28	▲2.03
BSP	Madan Harishchandra Khale	1,948	1.48	▲0.86
Margin of victory		39,337	29.95	▲1.10
Turnout		135,727		▼5.35
Total valid votes		131,353		
Registered electors		274,989		
SS hold		Swing	▲9.26	

=== Assembly Election 2014 ===
2014 Maharashtra Legislative Assembly election : Shivadi
Party	Candidate	Votes	%	±%
SS	Ajay Vinayak Choudhari	72,462	49.88	▲8.76
MNS	Bala Nandgaonkar	30,553	21.03	▼24.68
BJP	Shalaka Salvi	21,921	15.09	New
INC	Jamsutkar Manoj Pandurang	12,732	8.77	▼2.19
NCP	Nandakumar Katkar	5,269	3.63	New
NOTA	None of the Above	1,816	1.25	New
BSP	Jadhav Vijay Sadashiv	903	0.62	▲0.09
CPI	Chandrakant B. Desai	882	0.61	▼0.49
Margin of victory		41,909	28.85	▲24.26
Turnout		147,076		▲0.57
Total valid votes		145,259		
Registered electors		273,495		
SS gain from MNS		Swing	▲4.17	

=== Assembly Election 2009 ===
2009 Maharashtra Legislative Assembly election : Shivadi
Party	Candidate	Votes	%	±%
MNS	Bala Nandgaonkar	64,375	45.71	New
SS	Dagdu (Dada) Sakpal	57,912	41.12	New
INC	Smita Choudhari (Dhruva)	15,431	10.96	New
CPI	Ghagare Narayan Sakharam	1,552	1.10	New
Margin of victory		6,463	4.59	▼16.47
Turnout		140,825	52.54	▼1.16
Total valid votes		140,825		
Registered electors		268,013		▲82.70
MNS gain from NCP		Swing	▼9.90	

=== Assembly Election 2004 ===
2004 Maharashtra Legislative Assembly election : Shivadi
Party	Candidate	Votes	%	±%
NCP	Sachin Mohan Ahir	43,816	55.61	▲12.21
BJP	Sunil Rane	27,225	34.55	▼1.61
BSP	Timma Timmappa Gollar	5,997	7.61	▲2.96
SP	Rizwan Ur Rehman Gulam Hussain Qadri	1,176	1.49	New
BBM	Ganesh Madhav Kate	575	0.73	▼11.25
Margin of victory		16,591	21.06	▲13.82
Turnout		78,792	53.71	▲5.55
Total valid votes		78,789		
Registered electors		146,698		▼4.26
NCP hold		Swing	▲12.21	

=== Assembly Election 1999 ===
1999 Maharashtra Legislative Assembly election : Shivadi
Party	Candidate	Votes	%	±%
NCP	Sachin Mohan Ahir	32,023	43.40	New
BJP	Datta Rane	26,685	36.16	▼2.98
BBM	Madhu Mohite	8,840	11.98	New
BSP	Kamble Rajanish Shivaji	3,433	4.65	New
JD(U)	Pralhad Tukaram Kharat	1,282	1.74	New
National Minorities Party	Aslam Hanif Khot	904	1.23	New
Independent	C. K. Shirsat (A) Nanasaheb Chaskar	624	0.85	New
Margin of victory		5,338	7.23	▼10.95
Turnout		73,803	48.16	▼13.29
Total valid votes		73,791		
Registered electors		153,232		▲4.39
NCP gain from BJP		Swing	▲4.25	

=== Assembly Election 1995 ===
1995 Maharashtra Legislative Assembly election : Shivadi
Party	Candidate	Votes	%	±%
BJP	Rane Dattatraya Mahadeo	35,305	39.14	▲0.89
INC	Gaikwad Sumant Sitaram	18,900	20.95	New
Independent	Dr. Datta Samant	18,695	20.73	New
Independent	Ahir Sachin Mohan	7,530	8.35	New
JD	Jain Narendra Mohanlal	2,781	3.08	▼25.13
RPI	Dr. Gawai Rajendra Ramkrishna	2,654	2.94	▼25.09
Akhil Bharatiya Jan Sangh	Bateshwarnath Ramavadhesh Mishra	1,122	1.24	New
Margin of victory		16,405	18.19	▲8.15
Turnout		91,604	62.40	▲9.80
Total valid votes		90,194		
Registered electors		146,791		▼7.76
BJP hold		Swing	▲0.89	

=== Assembly Election 1990 ===
1990 Maharashtra Legislative Assembly election : Shivadi
Party	Candidate	Votes	%	±%
BJP	Datta Rane	31,442	38.26	New
JD	Dadu Santu Atyalkar	23,192	28.22	New
RPI	Sumant Sitaram Gaikwad	23,040	28.03	▲24.95
DMM	Shaikh Mohammed Hanif Chandmiya	2,478	3.01	New
BSP	Radheshyam Ramsunder Patel	728	0.89	New
Independent	Uddhav Mahadev Bansode	685	0.83	New
Margin of victory		8,250	10.04	▲8.52
Turnout		83,344	52.37	▼2.26
Total valid votes		82,190		
Registered electors		159,133		▲17.84
BJP gain from Independent		Swing	▲7.24	

=== Assembly Election 1985 ===
1985 Maharashtra Legislative Assembly election : Shivadi
Party	Candidate	Votes	%	±%
Independent	Dadu Santu Atyalkar	22,578	31.02	New
INC	Deshpande Sudhakar Hanumanrao	21,473	29.50	New
Independent	Datta Nalavade	13,118	18.02	New
JP	C. R. Pinto	7,771	10.68	New
Independent	Hindurao S. Varale	2,864	3.93	New
RPI	R. G. Kharat	2,241	3.08	New
Independent	Vishram Shivram Kadam	734	1.01	New
Margin of victory		1,105	1.52	▼28.73
Turnout		73,661	54.55	▲14.15
Total valid votes		72,793		
Registered electors		135,039		▲4.59
Independent gain from INC(I)		Swing	▼33.03	

=== Assembly Election 1980 ===
1980 Maharashtra Legislative Assembly election : Shivadi
Party	Candidate	Votes	%	±%
INC(I)	Bhaurao Patil	32,874	64.05	▲47.70
Independent	Kamble Devidas Pundlik	17,349	33.80	New
Independent	Salvi R. R.	754	1.47	New
Independent	Ragedadhavrao H. R.	351	0.68	New
Margin of victory		15,525	30.25	▲13.48
Turnout		51,919	40.21	▼25.37
Total valid votes		51,328		
Registered electors		129,114		▲7.84
INC(I) gain from Independent		Swing	▲27.36	

=== Assembly Election 1978 ===
1978 Maharashtra Legislative Assembly election : Shivadi
Party	Candidate	Votes	%	±%
Independent	Kamble Devidas Pundlik	28,606	36.69	New
SS	Datta Nalavade	15,532	19.92	New
INC(I)	Patel Punamchand Tabhaji	12,746	16.35	New
INC	Phalke Manohar Jyotiba	9,068	11.63	New
Independent	Purushottam (Uttam) Bansi Bhagwat	7,526	9.65	New
CPI	Narayan Anadrao Alias Bhagwan Thorat	3,833	4.92	New
Independent	Dashrath Sakharam Mane	477	0.61	New
Margin of victory		13,074	16.77	
Turnout		79,330	66.26	
Total valid votes		77,974		
Registered electors		119,729		
Independent win (new seat)				
