= Mumbra-Kalwa Assembly constituency =

Constituency of the Maharashtra legislative assembly in India

Coordinates: 19.1812027°N 72.9808599°E

Mumbra-Kalwa
- Constituency No. 149 for the Maharashtra Legislative Assembly

Constituency details
- Country: India
- Region: Western India
- State: Maharashtra
- District: Thane
- Lok Sabha constituency: Kalyan
- Established: 2008
- Total electors: 485,415
- Reservation: None

Member of Legislative Assembly
- 15th Maharashtra Legislative Assembly
- Incumbent Jitendra Awhad
- Party: NCP-SP
- Alliance: MVA
- Elected year: 2024

Mumbra-Kalwa Assembly constituency is one of the 288 Vidhan Sabha (Assembly) constituencies of Maharashtra state in Western India.

== Members of Assembly ==
| Year | Member | Party |
|---|---|---|
Until 2008: Constituency did not exist
| 2009 | Jitendra Awhad | Nationalist Congress Party |
| 2014 | Jitendra Awhad | Nationalist Congress Party |
| 2019 | Jitendra Awhad | Nationalist Congress Party |
| 2024 | Jitendra Awhad | Nationalist Congress Party – Sharadchandra Pawar |

== Election results ==
=== Assembly Election 2024 ===
2024 Maharashtra Legislative Assembly election : Mumbra-Kalwa
| Party | Candidate | Votes | % | ±% |
|---|---|---|---|---|
| NCP-SP | Jitendra Satish Awhad | 157,141 | 62.59 | New |
| NCP | Najeeb Mulla | 60,913 | 24.26 | −37.67 |
| MNS | Sushant Vilas Suryarao | 13,914 | 5.54 | New |
| AIMIM | Saif pathan | 13,519 | 5.38 | New |
| NOTA | None of the Above | 2,679 | 1.07 | ▼0.40 |
| VBA | Pandhrinath Shimgya Gaikwad | 1,678 | 0.67 | New |
| Margin of victory | | 96,228 | 38.33 | ▼4.54 |
| Turnout | | 253,758 | 52.28 | ▲2.38 |
| Total valid votes | | 251,079 | | |
| Registered electors | | 485,415 | | ▲35.75 |
| NCP-SP hold | | Swing | ▲0.66 | |

=== Assembly Election 2019 ===
2019 Maharashtra Legislative Assembly election : Mumbra-Kalwa
| Party | Candidate | Votes | % | ±% |
|---|---|---|---|---|
| NCP | Jitendra Satish Awhad | 109,283 | 61.93 | ▲9.06 |
| SS | Deepali Jahangir Sayed | 33,644 | 19.07 | ▼4.67 |
| AAP | Abu Altamash Faizi | 30,520 | 17.30 | New |
| NOTA | None of the Above | 2,591 | 1.47 | ▲0.44 |
| Margin of victory | | 75,639 | 42.86 | ▲13.73 |
| Turnout | | 179,060 | 50.08 | ▲2.38 |
| Total valid votes | | 176,459 | | |
| Registered electors | | 357,578 | | ▲2.61 |
| NCP hold | | Swing | ▲9.06 | |

=== Assembly Election 2014 ===
2014 Maharashtra Legislative Assembly election : Mumbra-Kalwa
| Party | Candidate | Votes | % | ±% |
|---|---|---|---|---|
| NCP | Jitendra Satish Awhad | 86,533 | 52.87 | ▲6.30 |
| SS | Dasharath Kashinath Patil | 38,850 | 23.74 | ▼10.96 |
| AIMIM | Asharaf Mulani | 16,374 | 10.00 | New |
| BJP | Ashok Narayan Bhoir | 12,818 | 7.83 | New |
| INC | Yasin Ayyub Quraishi | 3,847 | 2.35 | New |
| MNS | Mahesh Salvi | 2,887 | 1.76 | ▼9.68 |
| NOTA | None of the Above | 1,685 | 1.03 | New |
| Margin of victory | | 47,683 | 29.13 | ▲17.25 |
| Turnout | | 165,366 | 47.45 | ▼0.28 |
| Total valid votes | | 163,669 | | |
| Registered electors | | 348,482 | | ▲24.65 |
| NCP hold | | Swing | ▲6.30 | |

=== Assembly Election 2009 ===
2009 Maharashtra Legislative Assembly election : Mumbra-Kalwa
| Party | Candidate | Votes | % | ±% |
|---|---|---|---|---|
| NCP | Jitendra Satish Awhad | 61,510 | 46.57 | New |
| SS | Kine Rajan Narayan | 45,821 | 34.69 | New |
| MNS | Pawar Prashant Balkrishana | 15,119 | 11.45 | New |
| SP | Surme Yasin Abdul Latif | 3,429 | 2.60 | New |
| BSP | Mhatre Sachin Jayraj | 2,756 | 2.09 | New |
| RKSP | Chaudhary Mashhoor Alam Mo.Rais | 926 | 0.70 | New |
| Margin of victory | | 15,689 | 11.88 | |
| Turnout | | 132,083 | 47.25 | |
| Total valid votes | | 132,073 | | |
| Registered electors | | 279,567 | | |
| NCP win (new seat) | | | | |

== See also ==
- List of constituencies of the Maharashtra Legislative Assembly
