= Amin Patel =

Indian politician

Member of the Maharashtra Legislative Assembly
- Incumbent
- Assumed office 2009
- Preceded by: Raj K. Purohit
- Constituency: Mumbadevi

Deputy Group Leader of Legislative Assembly Congress Party
- Incumbent
- Assumed office 28 Feb 2025
- Leader: Vijay Namdevrao Wadettiwar

Personal details
- Born: 13 January 1963 (age 63) Bombay Mumbai, Maharashtra
- Party: Indian National Congress
- Education: Dawoodbhoy Fazalbhoy High School, Mumbai (1978)
- Occupation: Politician, Business
- Profession: Business

Amin Amir Ali Patel is an Indian politician from Maharashtra. He belongs to the Ismaili Khoja Muslim community, who are the disciples of the Aga Khan and he is a four-term Member of the Maharashtra Legislative Assembly. He won from the Mumbadevi Constituency of Mumbai.

== Positions held ==
- Maharashtra Legislative Assembly MLA
- Terms in office: 2009
- Deputy Leader Of Congress Party Maharashtra Vidhan Sabha.
