= Annie Shekhar =

Indian politician (c. 1938 – 2022)

Maharashtra Legislative Assembly
- In office 2004 to 2009 – 2009 to 2014
- Preceded by: Dinaz Patrawala
- Succeeded by: Raj K. Purohit
- Constituency: Colaba (Vidhan Sabha constituency)

Personal details
- Born: c. 1938 Kerala, India
- Died: 2 October 2022 (aged 84) Mumbai, India
- Party: Indian National Congress
- Spouse: Sitambalam Chandrashekhar
- Children: Sabina Chandrashekhar (daughter); Suresh Chandrashekhar (son); Vinod Shekhar (son); Anita Shekhar Castellino (daughter); Vijay Shekhar (son)
- Occupation: Social Worker & Politician

Annie Shekhar (c. 1938 – 2 October 2022) was an Indian politician who was a senior member of the Indian National Congress.

== Career ==
She was first elected as president of Colaba Mahila Congress and later as the General Secretary of the M.R.C.C. She was a two term municipal corporator at the BMC, and later a two term member of the Maharashtra Legislative Assembly, representing the Colaba constituency. From 2006 to 2009, she served as Chairperson of the Children's Aid Society with the rank of minister of state.

== Positions held ==
- President of Colaba Mahila Congress.
- General Secretary of the M.R.C.C.
- Municipal Corporator at the BMC (1992–1997; 1997–2002).
- Maharashtra Legislative Assembly MLA (2004–2009; 2009–2014).
- Chairperson of the Children's Aid Society, holding the rank of Minister of State (2006–2009).

== Death ==
Shekhar died on 2 October 2022, aged 84.
