= New India Cooperative Bank =

Indian cooperative bank

- Formerly: Bombay Labour Cooperative Bank Ltd.
- Company type: Cooperative bank
- Industry: Banking, Financial services
- Founded: 6 December 1967; 58 years ago in Mumbai, India
- Founder: George Fernandes; Ranjit Bhanu
- Headquarters: Mumbai, Maharashtra, India
- Number of locations: 30 branches (2024)
- Area served: Maharashtra, Gujarat
- Key people: Shreekant (Administrator)
- Products: Loans, banking services
- Services: Retail banking, loans (home, personal, small business)
- Net income: ▼₹22.77 crore loss (2023–24) (2024)
- Capital ratio: 9.06% (CRAR, 2024)
- Website: https://www.newindiabank.in/

New India Cooperative Bank Limited (also known as NICB) is a Mumbai-based cooperative bank, which was incorporated on 6 December 1967. It provides a range of financial services, including home, personal, and small business loans. As of March 2024, the bank operated 30 branches across Maharashtra and Gujarat, managing deposits of ₹2,436 crore and serving over 130,000 depositors. The bank reported losses of ₹22.78 crore in 2023–24 and ₹30.74 crore in 2022–23.

Since February 2025, the bank has been under scrutiny by the Reserve Bank of India over an alleged ₹122 crore scam.

== History ==
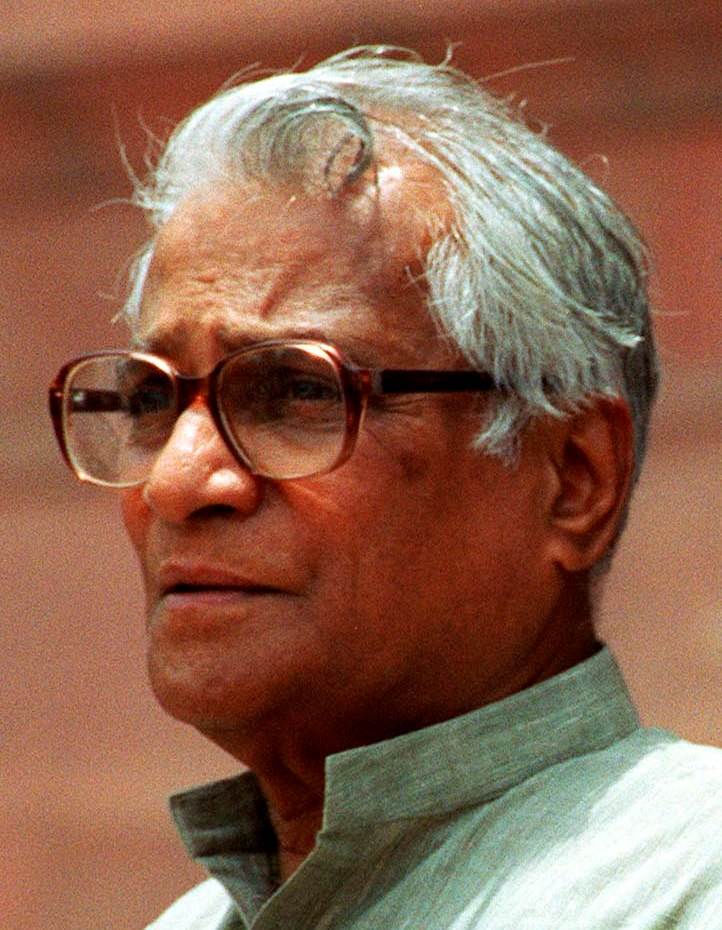
George Fernandes was the co-founder of the New India Co-operative Bank

New India Cooperative Bank was established in 1968 with the support of socialist leader and former Defence Minister George Fernandes. The bank was founded with the objective of providing financial services to underserved communities and promoting cooperative banking in India.

The bank was initially headquartered at the residence of Ranjit Bhanu, a criminal lawyer, trade unionist, former MLA, and co-founder, at Bazargate in Fort. It commenced operations with 555 members who had contributing an initial share capital of ₹1 lakh.

It was then known as the Bombay Labour Cooperative Bank Ltd. It was renamed New India Cooperative Bank in 1977 after the Emergency. The bank's founders took inspiration from the German Labour Bank model, which provided services to both workers and businesses.

On 14 February 2025, the Reserve Bank of India appointed Shreekant, former Chief General Manager of State Bank of India, as the Administrator of the bank. A Committee of Advisors, including Ravindra Sapra (former General Manager, SBI) and a chartered accountant, was also appointed to assist in managing the bank.

== Finance ==
As of 31 March 2024, New India Cooperative Bank reduced its losses to ₹22.77 crore from ₹30.74 crore in the previous year. The bank's advances portfolio declined by ₹155.04 crore (11.66%) to ₹1,174.84 crore, while deposits increased by 1.26% to ₹2,436.37 crore.

The Capital to Risk-Weighted Assets Ratio (CRAR) stood at 9.06%, below the RBI's required 10%. The bank undertook cost-cutting measures, including branch mergers and relocations, and generated ₹31.23 crore from the sale of three properties. As of March 2024, the bank’s gross NPA was 7.96%, and net NPA was 5.43%.

In the 2020-21 financial year, the bank recorded a net loss of ₹6.14 crore. In 2019-20, the bank had reported a net profit of ₹5.17 crore.

== Alleged financial irregularities ==
In February 2025, the Economic Offences Wing of the Mumbai Police arrested Hitesh Mehta, former general manager and head of accounts at New India Cooperative Bank, for allegedly misappropriating ₹122 crore from the bank's cash reserves. Dharmesh Paun, a real estate developer, was also arrested for allegedly facilitating the diversion of funds.

An inspection by the Reserve Bank of India on 12 February 2025, identified discrepancies in the bank's cash records, revealing ₹112 crore missing from the Prabhadevi branch safe and ₹10 crore from the Goregaon branch safe. Following this, the RBI imposed withdrawal restrictions on the bank. It has been allege that the misappropriation took place over six years, between 2019 and 2025.

The Reserve Bank of India also superseded the board of New India Cooperative Bank for 12 months following financial and operational restrictions related to irregular lending practices.

The Economic Offences Wing of Mumbai Police arrested former New India Cooperative Bank CEO Abhimanyu Bhoan on 20 February 2025 in connection with the ₹122 crore scam, making it the third arrest in the case.

As of 18 March 2025, a total of seven arrests have been made in connection with the case.

In March 2025, the Economic Offences Wing seized properties worth ₹28 crore belonging to Hiren Bhanu, former Chairman of the bank, son of co-founder Ranjit Bhanu and an alleged mastermind of the ₹122 crore scam, under Section 106 of BNS. Hiren Bhanu and his wife, Gauri Bhanu, former Vice Chairperson of the bank, have fled abroad, and a Blue Corner notice has been issued for their extradition.

== Penalties ==
In August 2021, the Reserve Bank of India had imposed a ₹25 lakh penalty on the bank for non-compliance with fraud monitoring and reporting guidelines, based on statutory inspections of its financial position as of March 2019. In January 2024, a ₹15 lakh penalty was imposed on New India Cooperative Bank by RBI for non-compliance with guidelines on donations and contributions from urban cooperative banks' profits.

== See also ==
- Co-operative banking
- Banking in India
- List of banks in India
