= Ranjit Bhanu =

Indian politician

Member of Maharashtra Legislative Assembly
- In office 1978–1980
- Constituency: Colaba

Personal details
- Political party: Janata Party
- Occupation: Politician, Lawyer, Trade Unionist
- Known for: Former MLA and former Chairman of New India Cooperative Bank

Ranjit Bhanu was an Indian politician, criminal lawyer, and trade unionist who served as a Member of the Maharashtra Legislative Assembly, representing the Colaba constituency from 1978 to 1980. A close associate of George Fernandes, he was a co-founder of the New India Cooperative Bank and also later served as its chairman.

== See also ==
- Maharashtra Legislative Assembly
- George Fernandes
- New India Cooperative Bank
- 1978 Maharashtra Legislative Assembly election
