= Tank Pakhadi Byculla West Kalachowki West Assembly constituency =

Constituency of the Maharashtra legislative assembly in India

Tank Pakhadi Byculla West Kalachowki West
- Former constituency for the Maharashtra Legislative Assembly

Constituency details
- Country: India
- Region: Western India
- State: Maharashtra
- Established: 1952
- Abolished: 1955
- Total electors: 52,817
- Reservation: None

Tank Pakhadi Byculla West Kalachowki West Assembly constituency was an assembly constituency in the India state of Maharashtra. After 1955 Delimitation act, it was split into Byculla, Mazgaon and Sewree.

== Members of the Legislative Assembly ==
| Election | Member | Party |
|---|---|---|
| 1952 | Silam, Sayaji Lakshman | Indian National Congress |

== Election results ==
=== Assembly Election 1952 ===
1952 Bombay State Legislative Assembly election : Tank Pakhadi Byculla West Kalachowki West
| Party | Candidate | Votes | % | ±% |
|---|---|---|---|---|
| INC | Silam, Sayaji Lakshman | 14,714 | 48.48% | New |
| Socialist | Mahajani, Damodar Ganesh | 8,103 | 26.70% | New |
| Independent | Jagtap, Bapurao Dhondiba | 6,968 | 22.96% | New |
| Independent | Khandray, Rajaram Madhavrao | 567 | 1.87% | New |
| Margin of victory | | 6,611 | 21.78% | |
| Turnout | | 30,352 | 57.47% | |
| Total valid votes | | 30,352 | | |
| Registered electors | | 52,817 | | |
| INC win (new seat) | | | | |
