= Sunil Shinde =

Indian politician

- सुनील शिंदे

Member of Maharashtra Legislative Council
- Incumbent
- Assumed office 5 January 2022
- Constituency: Mumbai Local Authorities

Member of Legislative Assembly
- In office 2014–2019
- Preceded by: Sachin Ahir
- Succeeded by: Aaditya Thackeray
- Constituency: Worli

Personal details
- Born: 22 February 1963 (age 63) Mumbai
- Party: Shiv Sena (Uddhav Balasaheb Thackeray)

Sunil Shinde is a Shiv Sena (UBT) politician from Mumbai, Maharashtra. He is member of Maharashtra Legislative Council from Mumbai local authorities constituency. He was Member of Legislative Assembly from Worli Vidhan Sabha constituency of Mumbai, Maharashtra, India as a member of Shiv Sena from 2014 to 2019.

== Positions held ==
- 2007: Elected as Corporator in Brihanmumbai Municipal Corporation
- 2011-2012: Chairman of Brihanmumbai Electric Supply and Transport
- 2014: Elected to Maharashtra Legislative Assembly
- 2015: Shiv Sena Sampark Pramukh North Ahmednagar
- 2021: Elected to Maharashtra Legislative Council

== See also ==
- Mumbai South Lok Sabha constituency
