= Mazgaon Ghodapdeo Assembly constituency =

Constituency of the Maharashtra legislative assembly in India

Mazgaon Ghodapdeo
- Former constituency for the Maharashtra Legislative Assembly

Constituency details
- Country: India
- Region: Western India
- State: Maharashtra
- Established: 1951
- Abolished: 1955
- Total electors: 52,797
- Reservation: None

Mazgaon Ghodapdeo Assembly constituency was an assembly constituency in the India state of Maharashtra. After the 1955 Delimitation act, it was merged with Mazgaon Assembly constituency.

== Members of the Legislative Assembly ==
Election	Member	Party
1952	Mascarenhas Mafaldo Ubaldo	Indian National Congress

== Election results ==
=== Assembly Election 1952 ===
1952 Bombay State Legislative Assembly election : Mazgaon Ghodapdeo
Party	Candidate	Votes	%	±%
INC	Mascarenhas Mafaldo Ubaldo	12,891	50.51%	New
Socialist	Dmello Placid Raymond	8,932	34.99%	New
PWPI	Kale, Ghansham Hari	2,734	10.71%	New
RRP	Sharma, Shivmurti Balkaram	967	3.79%	New
Margin of victory		3,959	15.51%	
Turnout		25,524	48.34%	
Total valid votes		25,524		
Registered electors		52,797		
INC win (new seat)				
