= Raj K. Purohit =

Indian politician (1955–2026)

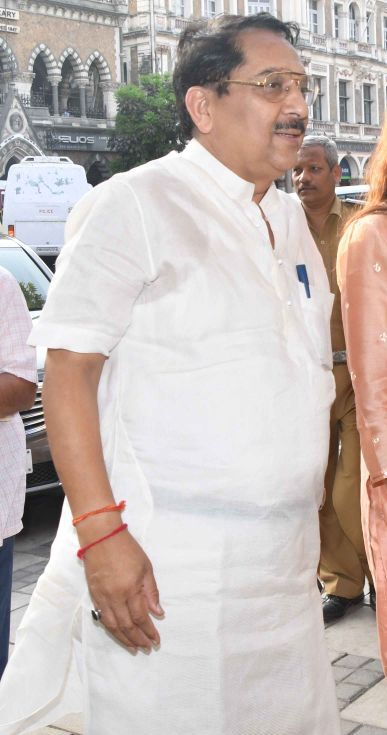

President of Bharatiya Janata Party – Mumbai
- In office 1 September 2010 – 10 June 2013
- President: Sudhir Mungantiwar
- Preceded by: Gopal Shetty
- Succeeded by: Ashish Shelar

Member of Maharashtra Legislative Assembly
- In office 2014–2019
- Preceded by: Annie Shekhar
- Succeeded by: Rahul Narwekar
- Constituency: Colaba
- In office 1990–2009
- Preceded by: Lalit Kapadia
- Succeeded by: Amin Patel
- Constituency: Mumbadevi

Personal details
- Born: 31 August 1955 Sirohi, Rajasthan, India
- Died: 18 January 2026 (aged 70) Mumbai, Maharashtra, India
- Party: Bharatiya Janata Party
- Children: 3
- Occupation: Politician
- Website: Website

Raj K. Purohit (31 August 1955 – 18 January 2026) was an Indian politician and a senior member of the Bharatiya Janata Party. He was a five-term member of the Maharashtra Legislative Assembly.

== Constituency ==
Raj K. Purohit was elected four times from the Mumbadevi assembly constituency and once from the Colaba constituency of Mumbai, Maharashtra. He was a member of the Maharashtra Legislative Assembly for over twenty-five years.

== Positions held ==
- Maharashtra Legislative Assembly MLA (1990–1995, 1995–1999, 1999–2004, 2004–2009 and 2014–2019).

== Death ==
Purohit died in Mumbai on 18 January 2026, at the age of 70.
