= Mumbadevi Assembly constituency =

Constituency of the Maharashtra legislative assembly in India

Coordinates: 22°32′28.36″N 72°57′45.17″E

Mumbadevi
- Constituency No. 186 for the Maharashtra Legislative Assembly

Constituency details
- Country: India
- Region: Western India
- State: Maharashtra
- District: Mumbai City
- Lok Sabha constituency: Mumbai South
- Established: 1978
- Total electors: 241,963
- Reservation: None

Member of Legislative Assembly
- 15th Maharashtra Legislative Assembly
- Incumbent Amin Patel
- Party: INC
- Alliance: MVA
- Elected year: 2024

Mumbadevi Assembly constituency is one of the 288 Vidhan Sabha (Assembly) constituencies of Maharashtra state in Western India.

== Demographics ==
Mumbadevi (constituency number 186) is one of the 10 constituencies of the Maharashtra Vidhan Sabha located in Mumbai City district. The number of electors in 2009 was 261,240 (male 150,015, female 111,225) .

It is a part of Mumbai South Lok Sabha constituency along with five other assembly constituencies, viz Worli, Byculla, Malabar Hill, Shivadi and Colaba.

== Members of the Legislative Assembly ==
Year	Member	Party
1951-1978: Constituency did not exist
1978	Mohanlal Parikh	Janata Party
1980	Nanubhai Patel	Bharatiya Janata Party
1985	Lalit Kapadia	Indian National Congress
1990	Raj K. Purohit	Bharatiya Janata Party
1995	Raj K. Purohit	Bharatiya Janata Party
1999	Raj K. Purohit	Bharatiya Janata Party
2004	Raj K. Purohit	Bharatiya Janata Party
Major boundary changes
2009	Amin Patel	Indian National Congress
2014	Amin Patel	Indian National Congress
2019	Amin Patel	Indian National Congress
2024	Amin Patel	Indian National Congress

== Election results ==
=== Assembly Election 2024 ===
2024 Maharashtra Legislative Assembly election : Mumbadevi
Party	Candidate	Votes	%	±%
INC	Amin Patel	74,990	63.95%	▲8.28
SS	Shaina Nana Chudasama	40,146	34.23%	▲0.91
NOTA	None of the Above	1,113	0.95%	▼0.50
ASP(KR)	Mohammed Shuaib Bashir Khateeb	1,031	0.88%	New
Margin of victory		34,844	29.71%	▲7.38
Turnout		118,384	48.93%	▲5.09
Total valid votes		117,271		
Registered electors		241,963		▼0.89
INC hold		Swing	▲8.28	

=== Assembly Election 2019 ===
2019 Maharashtra Legislative Assembly election : Mumbadevi
Party	Candidate	Votes	%	±%
INC	Amin Patel	58,952	55.66%	▲19.85
SS	Pandurang Ganpat Sakpal	35,297	33.33%	▲19.18
AIMIM	Bashir Musa Patel	6,373	6.02%	▼8.76
MNS	Keshav Ramesh Mulay	3,185	3.01%	▼0.28
NOTA	None of the Above	1,539	1.45%	▲0.72
VBA	Shamsher Khan Vazir Khan Pathan	1,264	1.19%	New
Margin of victory		23,655	22.34%	▲14.56
Turnout		108,343	44.38%	▼2.65
Total valid votes		105,908		
Registered electors		244,145		▲2.69
INC hold		Swing	▲19.85	

=== Assembly Election 2014 ===
2014 Maharashtra Legislative Assembly election : Mumbadevi
Party	Candidate	Votes	%	±%
INC	Amin Patel	39,188	35.81%	▼11.01
BJP	Atul Shah	30,675	28.03%	New
AIMIM	Mohammed Shahid Rafi	16,165	14.77%	New
SS	Salekar Yugandhara Yashwant	15,479	14.15%	▼15.48
MNS	Imtiaz Z. Anis	3,601	3.29%	New
NCP	Huzefa Electricwala	1,372	1.25%	New
NOTA	None of the Above	802	0.73%	New
Independent	Afzal Shabbirali Dawoodani	685	0.63%	New
Margin of victory		8,513	7.78%	▼9.43
Turnout		110,234	46.37%	▲9.01
Total valid votes		109,423		
Registered electors		237,743		▼9.00
INC hold		Swing	▼11.01	

=== Assembly Election 2009 ===
2009 Maharashtra Legislative Assembly election : Mumbadevi
Party	Candidate	Votes	%	±%
INC	Amin Patel	45,285	46.83%	▲7.08
SS	Anil Chandrakant Padwal	28,646	29.62%	New
SP	Bashir Moosa Patel	19,936	20.62%	New
Independent	Yakub Khan Usman Khan	1,265	1.31%	New
Margin of victory		16,639	17.21%	▲0.59
Turnout		96,718	37.02%	▼5.69
Total valid votes		96,705		
Registered electors		261,263		▲216.64
INC gain from BJP		Swing	▼9.54	

=== Assembly Election 2004 ===
2004 Maharashtra Legislative Assembly election : Mumbadevi
Party	Candidate	Votes	%	±%
BJP	Raj K. Purohit	19,862	56.37%	▼6.68
INC	Adv. Sushil D. Vyas	14,006	39.75%	▲5.94
PWPI	Ravindra Mehta (Bappa)	618	1.75%	New
Margin of victory		5,856	16.62%	▼12.62
Turnout		35,235	42.70%	▲2.91
Total valid votes		35,234		
Registered electors		82,511		▼16.60
BJP hold		Swing	▼6.68	

=== Assembly Election 1999 ===
1999 Maharashtra Legislative Assembly election : Mumbadevi
Party	Candidate	Votes	%	±%
BJP	Raj K. Purohit	24,823	63.05%	▲0.21
INC	Bhanwarsingh Narayansingh Rajpurohit	13,311	33.81%	▲5.51
Independent	Masood Sayed	322	0.82%	New
Margin of victory		11,512	29.24%	▼5.30
Turnout		39,370	39.80%	▼15.01
Total valid votes		39,370		
Registered electors		98,931		▲6.17
BJP hold		Swing	▲0.21	

=== Assembly Election 1995 ===
1995 Maharashtra Legislative Assembly election : Mumbadevi
Party	Candidate	Votes	%	±%
BJP	Raj K. Purohit	32,089	62.84%	▲12.86
INC	Bhanwarsingh Narayansingh Rajpurohit	14,451	28.30%	▼7.72
Independent	Azizbhai Shaikh Alibux	2,437	4.77%	New
Independent	Raichand Korshi Shah	606	1.19%	New
Independent	Gustadio Lawrence Pereira	481	0.94%	New
Independent	Rajda Kishor Gokuldas	311	0.61%	New
Margin of victory		17,638	34.54%	▲20.58
Turnout		51,824	55.62%	▲9.79
Total valid votes		51,067		
Registered electors		93,183		▼19.22
BJP hold		Swing	▲12.86	

=== Assembly Election 1990 ===
1990 Maharashtra Legislative Assembly election : Mumbadevi
Party	Candidate	Votes	%	±%
BJP	Raj K. Purohit	25,955	49.98%	▲15.63
INC	Lali Jamnadas Kapadia	18,706	36.02%	▼26.07
JD	Dinkarrai Dalpatram Jani	6,321	12.17%	New
Independent	Aslam Yasin Nirban	508	0.98%	New
Margin of victory		7,249	13.96%	▼13.78
Turnout		52,535	45.54%	▲10.89
Total valid votes		51,930		
Registered electors		115,358		▲6.68
BJP gain from INC		Swing	▼12.11	

=== Assembly Election 1985 ===
1985 Maharashtra Legislative Assembly election : Mumbadevi
Party	Candidate	Votes	%	±%
INC	Kapadia Lalit Jamnadas	22,910	62.09%	New
BJP	Nanubhai C. Patel	12,676	34.35%	▼10.53
Independent	D'Costa Alcantro Gregory	1,117	3.03%	New
Margin of victory		10,234	27.74%	▲25.50
Turnout		37,314	34.51%	▲1.92
Total valid votes		36,898		
Registered electors		108,136		▼0.11
INC gain from BJP		Swing	▲17.21	

=== Assembly Election 1980 ===
1980 Maharashtra Legislative Assembly election : Mumbadevi
Party	Candidate	Votes	%	±%
BJP	Nanubhai S. Patel (K. S. Patel)	15,643	44.88%	New
INC(I)	Lalit Jamnadas Kapadia	14,865	42.65%	▲31.46
JP	Parikh Mohanlal Pranlal	4,210	12.08%	▼51.76
Margin of victory		778	2.23%	▼45.87
Turnout		35,187	32.51%	▼22.46
Total valid votes		34,854		
Registered electors		108,251		▼2.84
BJP gain from JP		Swing	▼18.96	

=== Assembly Election 1978 ===
1978 Maharashtra Legislative Assembly election : Mumbadevi
Party	Candidate	Votes	%	±%
JP	Parikh Mohanlal Pranlal	38,872	63.84%	New
INC	Popat Mohan Bhavanbhai	9,580	15.73%	New
INC(I)	Sukla Prayagnarayan Madhavprasad Alias Nirjhar Shukla	6,815	11.19%	New
SS	Ashok Dwarkanath Jadhav	4,846	7.96%	New
Margin of victory		29,292	48.11%	
Turnout		61,682	55.36%	
Total valid votes		60,890		
Registered electors		111,413		
JP win (new seat)				
