= Kalmeshwar Assembly constituency =

Constituency of the Maharashtra legislative assembly in India

Kalmeshwar
- Former constituency for the Maharashtra Legislative Assembly

Constituency details
- Country: India
- Region: Western India
- State: Maharashtra
- Established: 1955
- Abolished: 2008
- Total electors: 275,717

Kalmeshwar Assembly constituency was an assembly constituency in the India state of Maharashtra.

== Members of the Legislative Assembly ==
Election	Member	Party
1957	S. K. Wankhede	Indian National Congress
1962	S. K. Wankhede	Indian National Congress
1967	S. K. Wankhede	Indian National Congress
1972	S. K. Wankhede	Indian National Congress
1978	Bhagwantrao Manikrao Gaikwad	All India Forward Bloc
1980	Bhagwantrao Manikrao Gaikwad	Indian National Congress (I)
1985	Bhagwantrao Manikrao Gaikwad	Indian National Congress
1990	Chhatrapal Anandrao Kedar alias Babasaheb Kedar	Indian National Congress
1995	Rameshchandra Gopikisan Bang	Independent politician
1999	Rameshchandra Gopikisan Bang	Nationalist Congress Party
2004	Rameshchandra Gopikisan Bang	Nationalist Congress Party

== Election results ==
=== Assembly Election 2004 ===
2004 Maharashtra Legislative Assembly election : Kalmeshwar
Party	Candidate	Votes	%	±%
NCP	Rameshchandra Gopikisan Bang	48,643	31.17%	▲1.20
Independent	Sunita Ramesh Gawande	45,579	29.21%	New
SS	Ramesh Zinguji Adhau	43,560	27.91%	▲0.97
BSP	Dr. Dilip Ganeshrao Deshmukh	9,527	6.10%	New
Independent	Sanjay Upasrao Patil	2,729	1.75%	New
Independent	Lambat Bandu Wasudev	1,014	0.65%	New
Independent	Dakhole Purushottam Madhukar	999	0.64%	New
Margin of victory		3,064	1.96%	▼1.04
Turnout		1,56,063	69.56%	▲11.39
Total valid votes		1,56,053		
Registered electors		2,24,350		▲13.10
NCP hold		Swing	▲1.20	

=== Assembly Election 1999 ===
1999 Maharashtra Legislative Assembly election : Kalmeshwar
Party	Candidate	Votes	%	±%
NCP	Rameshchandra Gopikisan Bang	34,580	29.97%	New
Independent	Ramesh alias Nana Pandurangji Gawande	31,117	26.97%	New
SS	Ramesh Zinguji Adhau	31,090	26.94%	▲9.88
Independent	Pandurang Daolat Mate	9,727	8.43%	New
Independent	Sheshrao Shamraoji Chafale	3,624	3.14%	New
GGP	Arun Bapurao Pandharam	1,312	1.14%	New
BBM	Nanaji Sitaram Shamkule	1,021	0.88%	▼2.71
Margin of victory		3,463	3.00%	▼2.12
Turnout		1,23,564	62.29%	▼14.80
Total valid votes		1,15,388		
Registered electors		1,98,358		▲2.23
NCP gain from Independent		Swing	▲5.17	

=== Assembly Election 1995 ===
1995 Maharashtra Legislative Assembly election : Kalmeshwar
Party	Candidate	Votes	%	±%
Independent	Rameshchandra Gopikisan Bang	35,118	24.80%	New
Independent	Pandurang Daolat Mate	27,869	19.68%	New
SS	Ramesh Zinguji Adhau	24,160	17.06%	▲10.93
INC	Ramesh alias Nana Pandurangji Gawande	23,456	16.57%	▼20.65
JD	Sunandatai Prabhakar Shete	7,412	5.23%	▼13.94
Independent	Chaple Sheshrao Shamrao	5,520	3.90%	New
BBM	Jaiswal Rajiv Dilip	5,090	3.59%	New
Margin of victory		7,249	5.12%	▼4.88
Turnout		1,45,184	74.82%	▲7.24
Total valid votes		1,41,598		
Registered electors		1,94,035		▲22.43
Independent gain from INC		Swing	▼12.41	

=== Assembly Election 1990 ===
1990 Maharashtra Legislative Assembly election : Kalmeshwar
Party	Candidate	Votes	%	±%
INC	Chhatrapal Anandrao Kedar	38,767	37.21%	▼9.15
Independent	Pandurang Narayanrao Gawande	28,348	27.21%	New
JD	Sunanda Prabhakar Shetty	19,979	19.18%	New
SS	Ravindra Dewaji Bhoge	6,389	6.13%	New
BSP	Somankar Manoharrao Damaji	2,621	2.52%	New
Independent	Karade Ruprao Sahebrao	2,541	2.44%	New
INS(SCS)	Doifode Murlidhar Santoshrao	1,100	1.06%	New
Margin of victory		10,419	10.00%	▲5.83
Turnout		1,05,800	66.76%	▲3.85
Total valid votes		1,04,173		
Registered electors		1,58,481		▲33.59
INC hold		Swing	▼9.15	

=== Assembly Election 1985 ===
1985 Maharashtra Legislative Assembly election : Kalmeshwar
Party	Candidate	Votes	%	±%
INC	Bhagwantrao Manikrao Gaikwad	34,035	46.36%	New
IC(S)	Sudhakar Shamraoji Deshmukh	30,975	42.19%	New
Independent	Lokhande Sachidanand Nathuji	3,850	5.24%	New
Independent	Markam Sheetal Kawadooji	2,282	3.11%	New
Margin of victory		3,060	4.17%	▼56.27
Turnout		74,742	63.00%	▲22.35
Total valid votes		73,410		
Registered electors		1,18,629		▲8.69
INC gain from INC(I)		Swing	▼29.41	

=== Assembly Election 1980 ===
1980 Maharashtra Legislative Assembly election : Kalmeshwar
Party	Candidate	Votes	%	±%
INC(I)	Bhagwantrao Manikrao Gaikwad	32,692	75.77%	New
INC(U)	Murkidhar Santosh Doiphode	6,616	15.33%	New
JP	Mahajan Ramdas Ganpatrao	2,283	5.29%	▼9.99
Independent	Nikose Shankar Nathuji	1,553	3.60%	New
Margin of victory		26,076	60.44%	▲4.72
Turnout		44,042	40.35%	▼35.69
Total valid votes		43,144		
Registered electors		1,09,145		▲5.59
INC(I) gain from AIFB		Swing	▲4.78	

=== Assembly Election 1978 ===
1978 Maharashtra Legislative Assembly election : Kalmeshwar
Party	Candidate	Votes	%	±%
AIFB	Bhagwantrao Manikrao Gaikwad	55,202	71.00%	▲26.95
JP	Wankhede Chandrashekhar Santoshrao	11,879	15.28%	New
INC	S. K. Wankhede	8,218	10.57%	▼41.63
Independent	Markam Sheetal Kawadooji	1,010	1.30%	New
Independent	Nikose Shankar Nathuji	599	0.77%	New
Margin of victory		43,323	55.72%	▲47.57
Turnout		79,828	77.22%	▲9.22
Total valid votes		77,753		
Registered electors		1,03,371		▲9.44
AIFB gain from INC		Swing	▲18.80	

=== Assembly Election 1972 ===
1972 Maharashtra Legislative Assembly election : Kalmeshwar
Party	Candidate	Votes	%	±%
INC	S. K. Wankhede	32,538	52.20%	▼1.10
AIFB	Jambuwantrao Dhote	27,460	44.05%	New
Independent	Patil Shriram Bhagwan	1,078	1.73%	New
RPI(K)	Tarachand Tirphude	479	0.77%	New
Independent	Masram Chandansingh	402	0.64%	New
Independent	Maroti Kewaji Patil	381	0.61%	New
Margin of victory		5,078	8.15%	▼4.69
Turnout		64,897	68.71%	▲1.58
Total valid votes		62,338		
Registered electors		94,453		▲9.55
INC hold		Swing	▼1.10	

=== Assembly Election 1967 ===
1967 Maharashtra Legislative Assembly election : Kalmeshwar
Party	Candidate	Votes	%	±%
INC	S. K. Wankhede	29,603	53.30%	▲2.07
Independent	B. A. Yaolkar	22,474	40.46%	New
RPI	D. J. Belekar	2,999	5.40%	New
Independent	A. M. Hingnekar	465	0.84%	New
Margin of victory		7,129	12.84%	▼6.02
Turnout		61,252	71.04%	▼1.90
Total valid votes		55,541		
Registered electors		86,217		▲12.43
INC hold		Swing	▲2.07	

=== Assembly Election 1962 ===
1962 Maharashtra Legislative Assembly election : Kalmeshwar
Party	Candidate	Votes	%	±%
INC	S. K. Wankhede	26,054	51.23%	▼18.01
Independent	Indubhushan Bhagwantrao Bhingare	16,467	32.38%	New
Independent	Indrarajsingh Chandansingh Masram	6,523	12.83%	New
Independent	Shriram Bhagwanji Patil	1,812	3.56%	New
Margin of victory		9,587	18.85%	▼26.36
Turnout		54,692	71.32%	▲2.26
Total valid votes		50,856		
Registered electors		76,687		▲10.12
INC hold		Swing	▼18.01	

=== Assembly Election 1957 ===
1957 Bombay State Legislative Assembly election : Kalmeshwar
Party	Candidate	Votes	%	±%
INC	S. K. Wankhede	30,887	69.24%	New
SCF	Fulzele Sadanand Jumman	10,719	24.03%	New
Independent	Giri Sadashio Saudagir	3,000	6.73%	New
Margin of victory		20,168	45.21%	
Turnout		44,606	64.05%	
Total valid votes		44,606		
Registered electors		69,640		
INC win (new seat)				
