= Colaba Assembly constituency =

Constituency of the Maharashtra legislative assembly in India

Colaba
- Constituency No. 187 for the Maharashtra Legislative Assembly

Constituency details
- Country: India
- Region: Western India
- State: Maharashtra
- District: Mumbai City
- Lok Sabha constituency: Mumbai South
- Established: 1957
- Total electors: 265,326
- Reservation: None

Member of Legislative Assembly
- 15th Maharashtra Legislative Assembly
- Incumbent Rahul Narwekar
- Party: Bharatiya Janata Party
- Elected year: 2024

Colaba Assembly constituency is one of the 288 Vidhan Sabha (legislative assembly) constituencies of Maharashtra state within Mumbai City in western India. Rahul Narwekar of the BJP is currently the MLA of Colaba Constituency

== Overview ==
Colaba (constituency number 187) is one of the 10 Vidhan Sabha constituencies located in the Mumbai City district. The number of electors in 2009 was 275,033 (male 159,519, female 115,514) 71,932 are from minority community.

Colaba is part of the Mumbai South Lok Sabha constituency along with five other Vidhan Sabha segments in Mumbai City district, namely Worli, Shivadi, Byculla, Malabar Hill and Mumbadevi.

== Members of the Legislative Assembly ==
Year	Member	Party
1957	Kalaram Shankar Dharia	Indian National Congress
1962	Kalaram Shankar Dharia	Indian National Congress
1967	B. B. K. Bawan	Independent
1972	Aloo Jal Chibber	Indian National Congress
1978	Ranjit Bhanu	Janata Party
1980	O. P. Bahl	Indian National Congress (I)
1985	Marzban Patrawala	Indian National Congress
1990	Marzban Patrawala	Indian National Congress
1995	Ashok Dhatrak	Indian National Congress
1999	Marzban Patrawala	Indian National Congress
2000	Dinaz Patrawala	Shiv Sena
2004	Annie Shekhar	Indian National Congress
Major boundary changes
2009	Annie Shekhar	Indian National Congress
2014	Raj K. Purohit	Bharatiya Janata Party
2019	Rahul Narwekar	Bharatiya Janata Party
2024	Rahul Narwekar	Bharatiya Janata Party

== Election results ==
=== Assembly Election 2024 ===
2024 Maharashtra Legislative Assembly election : Colaba
Party	Candidate	Votes	%	±%
BJP	Rahul Suresh Narwekar	81,085	69.66	▲14.30
INC	Heera Nawaji Devasi	32,504	27.93	▼11.83
NOTA	None of the Above	1,993	1.71	▼1.10
BSP	Rukhe Arjun Ganpat	833	0.72	▲0.12
Margin of victory		48,581	41.74	▲26.12
Turnout		118,389	44.62	▲4.97
Total valid votes		116,396		
Registered electors		265,326		▼0.47
BJP hold		Swing	▲14.30	

=== Assembly Election 2019 ===
2019 Maharashtra Legislative Assembly election : Colaba
Party	Candidate	Votes	%	±%
BJP	Rahul Suresh Narwekar	57,420	55.37	▲9.92
INC	Ashok Arjunrao Alias Bhai Jagtap	41,225	39.75	▲22.12
VBA	Jitendra Ramchandra Kamble	3,011	2.90	New
NOTA	None of the Above	2,921	2.82	▲1.51
Independent	Santosh Gopinath Chavan	667	0.64	New
Margin of victory		16,195	15.62	▼4.93
Turnout		107,025	40.15	▼6.69
Total valid votes		103,709		
Registered electors		266,587		▲4.98
BJP hold		Swing	▲9.92	

=== Assembly Election 2014 ===
2014 Maharashtra Legislative Assembly election : Colaba
Party	Candidate	Votes	%	±%
BJP	Raj K. Purohit	52,608	45.44	▲13.28
SS	Pandurang Ganpat Sakpal	28,821	24.90	New
INC	Annie Shekhar	20,410	17.63	▼22.70
NCP	Patel Bashir Musa	5,966	5.15	New
MNS	Arvind Dnyaneshwar Gawde	5,453	4.71	▼18.36
NOTA	None of the Above	1,516	1.31	New
BSP	Kamble Ramesh Kashiram	721	0.62	▼0.25
Margin of victory		23,787	20.55	▲12.38
Turnout		117,289	46.19	▲9.73
Total valid votes		115,767		
Registered electors		253,929		▼7.67
BJP gain from INC		Swing	▲5.11	

=== Assembly Election 2009 ===
2009 Maharashtra Legislative Assembly election : Colaba
Party	Candidate	Votes	%	±%
INC	Annie Shekhar	39,779	40.33	▼1.38
BJP	Raj K. Purohit	31,722	32.16	New
MNS	Arvind Dnyaneshwar Gawde	22,756	23.07	New
BSP	Ilyas Khan (Ilu )	865	0.88	New
RPI(A)	Manohar Gopal Jadhav	685	0.69	New
Independent	Shahbaz Khan	663	0.67	New
Margin of victory		8,057	8.17	▼7.66
Turnout		98,627	35.86	▼6.34
Total valid votes		98,627		
Registered electors		275,035		▲138.86
INC hold		Swing	▼1.38	

=== Assembly Election 2004 ===
2004 Maharashtra Legislative Assembly election : Colaba
Party	Candidate	Votes	%	±%
INC	Annie Shekhar	20,266	41.71	▼8.70
SS	Adv.Rahul Suresh Narwekar	12,576	25.88	▼0.07
Independent	Puran Doshi	5,916	12.18	New
SP	Ganesh Kumar Gupta	4,724	9.72	New
Independent	Ashok Premji Patel	2,092	4.31	New
BBM	Dada Sakpal	1,835	3.78	New
Independent	Sanap Vinayak Y	433	0.89	New
Margin of victory		7,690	15.83	▼8.63
Turnout		48,587	42.20	▲6.84
Total valid votes		48,586		
Registered electors		115,143		▼11.66
INC hold		Swing	▼8.70	

=== Assembly Election 1999 ===
1999 Maharashtra Legislative Assembly election : Colaba
Party	Candidate	Votes	%	±%
INC	Patrawala Marazban Jal	23,235	50.41	▼1.72
SS	Ad. Prakash Sampat Bhaud	11,962	25.95	▼11.79
NCP	Ashok Gangaram Dhatrak	9,914	21.51	New
Independent	Santosh Balkrishna Dhaval	543	1.18	New
Independent	Mishra Prema Dinesh	436	0.95	New
Margin of victory		11,273	24.46	▲10.06
Turnout		46,092	35.36	▼12.64
Total valid votes		46,090		
Registered electors		130,348		▲11.50
INC hold		Swing	▼1.72	

=== Assembly Election 1995 ===
1995 Maharashtra Legislative Assembly election : Colaba
Party	Candidate	Votes	%	±%
INC	Dhatrak Ashok Gangaram	29,256	52.14	▲11.89
SS	Narwekar Suresh Murari	21,178	37.74	▲9.47
JD	Kuldip Sitabi Adav	2,261	4.03	▼9.77
Independent	Peter Lobo	1,385	2.47	New
Independent	Tatyaram Tukaram Sonawane	477	0.85	New
Independent	Dhatigara Eric Nariman	347	0.62	New
Margin of victory		8,078	14.40	▲2.41
Turnout		57,132	48.87	▲6.65
Total valid votes		56,115		
Registered electors		116,901		▼2.44
INC hold		Swing	▲11.89	

=== Assembly Election 1990 ===
1990 Maharashtra Legislative Assembly election : Colaba
Party	Candidate	Votes	%	±%
INC	Patrawala Marazban Jal	19,945	40.25	▼20.33
SS	Gawade Dnyaneshwar Bhimmaji	14,007	28.27	New
Independent	Suresh Murari Narveker	8,015	16.17	New
JD	Usha Tripathi	6,837	13.80	New
Margin of victory		5,938	11.98	▼18.10
Turnout		50,188	41.89	▲8.77
Total valid votes		49,552		
Registered electors		119,822		▲13.51
INC hold		Swing	▼20.33	

=== Assembly Election 1985 ===
1985 Maharashtra Legislative Assembly election : Colaba
Party	Candidate	Votes	%	±%
INC	Patrawala Marazban Jal	20,836	60.58	New
JP	Sharad Rao	10,489	30.50	▲11.66
Independent	Ankush Sakharam Ruke	2,819	8.20	New
Margin of victory		10,347	30.08	▲10.95
Turnout		34,791	32.96	▼3.04
Total valid votes		34,394		
Registered electors		105,561		▲9.97
INC gain from INC(I)		Swing	▲10.60	

=== Assembly Election 1980 ===
1980 Maharashtra Legislative Assembly election : Colaba
Party	Candidate	Votes	%	±%
INC(I)	O. P. Bahl	17,091	49.98	▲29.77
BJP	Haresh Jagtiani	10,547	30.85	New
JP	Ranjit Bhanu	6,440	18.83	▼26.78
Margin of victory		6,544	19.14	▼6.26
Turnout		34,514	35.96	▼18.15
Total valid votes		34,193		
Registered electors		95,990		▼3.83
INC(I) gain from JP		Swing	▲4.37	

=== Assembly Election 1978 ===
1978 Maharashtra Legislative Assembly election : Colaba
Party	Candidate	Votes	%	±%
JP	Ranjit Bhanu	24,479	45.61	New
INC(I)	Vyas Manjula Mukundray	10,848	20.21	New
Independent	Boman Behram Boman Kavasji	8,110	15.11	New
INC	Chibber Aloo Jal	4,237	7.89	▼65.48
SS	Palav Jagannath Jairam	3,056	5.69	New
Independent	Bhaskar Sadashiv Kargutkar	2,685	5.00	New
Margin of victory		13,631	25.40	▼26.15
Turnout		54,607	54.71	▲1.99
Total valid votes		53,668		
Registered electors		99,811		▲39.73
JP gain from INC		Swing	▼27.76	

=== Assembly Election 1972 ===
1972 Maharashtra Legislative Assembly election : Colaba
Party	Candidate	Votes	%	±%
INC	Aloo Jal Chibber	27,141	73.38	▲43.5
INC(O)	Jamitram Kashiram Joshi	8,075	21.83	New
Independent	Shankar Govind Khanekar	1,562	4.22	New
Margin of victory		19,066	51.55	▲29.82
Turnout		37,731	52.82	▼11.76
Total valid votes		36,989		
Registered electors		71,430		▼0.51
INC gain from Independent		Swing	▲21.78	

=== Assembly Election 1967 ===
1967 Maharashtra Legislative Assembly election : Colaba
Party	Candidate	Votes	%	±%
Independent	B. B. K. Bawan	23,536	51.59	New
INC	K. S. Dhabia	13,627	29.87	▼24.02
ABJS	S. K. Bahl	4,656	10.21	▲4.19
PSP	M. M. Cheriyan	3,799	8.33	New
Margin of victory		9,909	21.72	▼12.47
Turnout		47,442	66.08	▲11.96
Total valid votes		45,618		
Registered electors		71,794		▲3.13
Independent gain from INC		Swing	▼2.30	

=== Assembly Election 1962 ===
1962 Maharashtra Legislative Assembly election : Colaba
Party	Candidate	Votes	%	±%
INC	Kalaram Shankar Dharia	19,351	53.89	New
SWA	Phiroze Jamshedji Shroff	7,073	19.70	New
CPI	Penambur Vishnu Narayan Upadhyay	5,157	14.36	New
Socialist Party (India)	Palkhat Chandy Cheriyan	2,166	6.03	New
ABJS	Murlidhar Vishindas Mulchandani	2,159	6.01	New
Margin of victory		12,278	34.19	
Turnout		37,087	53.27	
Total valid votes		35,906		
Registered electors		69,617		
INC win (new seat)				

== See also ==
- Colaba
- List of constituencies of Maharashtra Vidhan Sabha
