= Walkeshwar Assembly constituency =

Constituency of the Maharashtra legislative assembly in India

Walkeshwar
- Former constituency for the Maharashtra Legislative Assembly

Constituency details
- Country: India
- Region: Western India
- State: Maharashtra
- Established: 1955
- Abolished: 1976
- Total electors: 106,468

Walkeshwar Assembly constituency was an assembly constituency in the India state of Maharashtra.

== Members of the Legislative Assembly ==
Election	Member	Party
1957	Silam Sayaji Laxman	Indian National Congress
1962	Maniben Nanubhai Desai	Indian National Congress
1967	H. J. Taleyarkhan	Indian National Congress
1972	Harishkumar N. Trivedi	Indian National Congress

== Election results ==
=== Assembly Election 1972 ===
1972 Maharashtra Legislative Assembly election : Walkeshwar
Party	Candidate	Votes	%	±%
INC	Harishkumar N. Trivedi	36,416	59.85%	▲13.65
ABJS	J. Navichandra Mehta	24,431	40.15%	New
Margin of victory		11,985	19.70%	▲4.01
Turnout		62,079	58.31%	▼7.37
Total valid votes		60,847		
Registered electors		106,468		▲22.87
INC hold		Swing	▲13.65	

=== Assembly Election 1967 ===
1967 Maharashtra Legislative Assembly election : Walkeshwar
Party	Candidate	Votes	%	±%
INC	H. J. Taleyarkhan	25,491	46.20%	▼3.30
SWA	N. M. Chudasama	16,833	30.51%	▲9.80
CPI	R. V. Deshpande	10,126	18.35%	▼1.05
PSP	N. B. Shintre	2,295	4.16%	▼6.24
Independent	D. M. Nagarkatti	434	0.79%	New
Margin of victory		8,658	15.69%	▼13.10
Turnout		56,906	65.67%	▲8.65
Total valid votes		55,179		
Registered electors		86,649		▲0.43
INC hold		Swing	▼3.30	

=== Assembly Election 1962 ===
1962 Maharashtra Legislative Assembly election : Walkeshwar
Party	Candidate	Votes	%	±%
INC	Maniben Nanubhai Desai	24,351	49.49%	▼4.74
SWA	Piloo Homi Mody	10,187	20.71%	New
CPI	Tara Gangaram Reddi	9,544	19.40%	New
PSP	Pyarelal Shamrao Paralkar	5,117	10.40%	▼35.36
Margin of victory		14,164	28.79%	▲20.31
Turnout		50,833	58.92%	▼9.58
Total valid votes		49,199		
Registered electors		86,275		▲15.75
INC hold		Swing	▼4.74	

=== Assembly Election 1957 ===
1957 Bombay State Legislative Assembly election : Walkeshwar
Party	Candidate	Votes	%	±%
INC	Silam Sayaji Laxman	26,925	54.24%	New
PSP	Donde Moreshwar Vasudeo	22,718	45.76%	New
Margin of victory		4,207	8.47%	
Turnout		49,643	66.60%	
Total valid votes		49,643		
Registered electors		74,536		
INC win (new seat)				
