= Worli Assembly constituency =

Constituency of the Maharashtra legislative assembly in India

Worli
- Constituency No. 182 for the Maharashtra Legislative Assembly
- Aaditya Thackeray, present MLA of Worli

Constituency details
- Country: India
- Region: Western India
- State: Maharashtra
- District: Mumbai City
- Lok Sabha constituency: Mumbai South
- Established: 1955
- Total electors: 264,583
- Reservation: None

Member of Legislative Assembly
- 15th Maharashtra Legislative Assembly
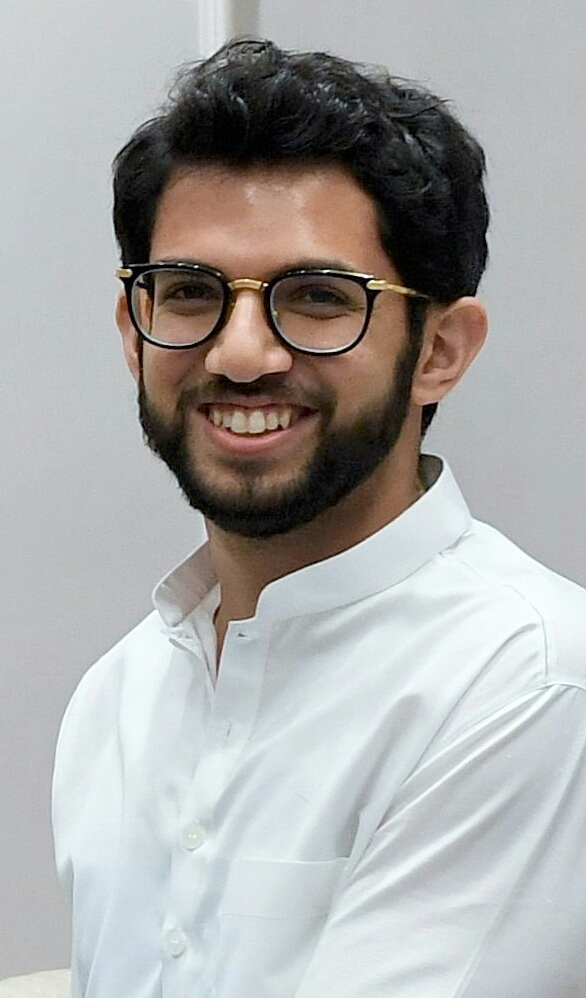
- Incumbent Aaditya Thackeray
- Party: SS(UBT)
- Alliance: MVA
- Elected year: 2024

Worli Assembly constituency is one of the 288 Vidhan Sabha (Assembly) constituencies of Maharashtra state in Western India.

== Demographics ==
Worli (constituency number 182) is one of the 10 Vidhan Sabha constituencies located in the Mumbai City district. Number of electorates in 2009 was 283,507 (male 160,641, female 122,866) 55,376 are from minority.

It is a part of Mumbai South Lok Sabha constituency along with five other assembly constituencies, viz Shivadi, Byculla, Malabar Hill, Mumbadevi and Colaba.

== Members of the Legislative Assembly ==
| Election | Member | Party |
|---|---|---|
| 1957 | Bhandare Ramchandra Dhondiba | Scheduled Castes Federation |
| 1962 | Madhav Narayan Birje | Indian National Congress |
| 1967 | Madhav Narayan Birje | Indian National Congress |
| 1972 | Sharad Dighe | Indian National Congress |
| 1978 | Kurane Pralhad Krushna | Communist Party of India |
| 1980 | Sharad Dighe | Indian National Congress |
| 1985 | Vinita Datta Samant | Independent politician |
| 1990 | Dattaji Nalawade | Shiv Sena |
| 1995 | Dattaji Nalawade | Shiv Sena |
| 1999 | Dattaji Nalawade | Shiv Sena |
| 2004 | Dattaji Nalawade | Shiv Sena |
| 2009 | Sachin Ahir | Nationalist Congress Party |
| 2014 | Sunil Shinde | Shiv Sena |
| 2019 | Aaditya Thackeray | Shiv Sena |
| 2024 | Aaditya Thackeray | Shiv Sena (UBT) |

== Election results ==
=== Assembly Election 2024 ===
2024 Maharashtra Legislative Assembly election : Worli
| Party | Candidate | Votes | % | ±% |
|---|---|---|---|---|
| SS(UBT) | Aaditya Thackeray | 63,324 | 44.68 | New |
| SS | Milind Deora | 54,523 | 38.47 | ▼34.23 |
| MNS | Sandeep Sudhakar Deshpande | 19,367 | 13.66 | New |
| VBA | Amol Anand Nikalje | 2,885 | 2.04 | ▼3.32 |
| NOTA | None of the Above | 1,562 | 1.10 | ▼4.03 |
| Margin of victory | | 8,801 | 6.21 | ▼48.71 |
| Turnout | | 143,301 | 54.16 | ▲6.02 |
| Total valid votes | | 141,739 | | |
| Registered electors | | 264,583 | | ▼1.64 |
| SS(UBT) gain from SS | | Swing | ▼28.02 | |

=== Assembly Election 2019 ===
2019 Maharashtra Legislative Assembly election : Worli
| Party | Candidate | Votes | % | ±% |
|---|---|---|---|---|
| SS | Aaditya Thackeray | 89,248 | 72.70 | ▲31.36 |
| NCP | Adv. (Dr.) Suresh Mane | 21,821 | 17.77 | ▼7.87 |
| VBA | Gautam Anna Gaikwad | 6,572 | 5.35 | New |
| NOTA | None of the Above | 6,305 | 5.14 | ▲4.07 |
| BSP | Vishram Tida Padam | 1,932 | 1.57 | ▲0.28 |
| Independent | Adv. Rupesh Lilachandra Turbhekar | 829 | 0.68 | New |
| Independent | Abhijit Wamanrao Bichukale | 781 | 0.64 | New |
| Margin of victory | | 67,427 | 54.92 | ▲39.23 |
| Turnout | | 129,499 | 48.14 | ▼7.18 |
| Total valid votes | | 122,769 | | |
| Registered electors | | 269,003 | | ▲1.48 |
| SS hold | | Swing | ▲31.36 | |

=== Assembly Election 2014 ===
2014 Maharashtra Legislative Assembly election : Worli
| Party | Candidate | Votes | % | ±% |
|---|---|---|---|---|
| SS | Sunil Govind Shinde | 60,625 | 41.34 | ▲7.33 |
| NCP | Sachin Ahir | 37,613 | 25.65 | ▼12.18 |
| BJP | Sunil Dattatray Rane | 30,849 | 21.04 | New |
| MNS | Kudtarkar Vijay Bhau | 8,423 | 5.74 | ▼17.75 |
| INC | Dattatray Ramchandra Naughane | 5,941 | 4.05 | New |
| BSP | Jaiswar Raju Terasnath | 1,901 | 1.30 | ▼0.42 |
| NOTA | None of the Above | 1,559 | 1.06 | New |
| Margin of victory | | 23,012 | 15.69 | ▲11.87 |
| Turnout | | 148,261 | 55.93 | ▲6.47 |
| Total valid votes | | 146,653 | | |
| Registered electors | | 265,091 | | ▼6.50 |
| SS gain from NCP | | Swing | ▲3.51 | |

=== Assembly Election 2009 ===
2009 Maharashtra Legislative Assembly election : Worli
| Party | Candidate | Votes | % | ±% |
|---|---|---|---|---|
| NCP | Sachin Ahir | 52,398 | 37.83 | ▲7.03 |
| SS | Ashish Chemburkar | 47,104 | 34.01 | ▼10.12 |
| MNS | Jamdar Sanjay Chandrakant | 32,542 | 23.49 | New |
| BSP | Rajanish Shivaji Kamble | 2,381 | 1.72 | ▲0.21 |
| LJP | Kiran Shantaram Mane | 1,537 | 1.11 | New |
| BBM | Dr. Mane Vijay Baburao | 843 | 0.61 | New |
| Margin of victory | | 5,294 | 3.82 | ▼9.51 |
| Turnout | | 138,522 | 48.86 | ▼3.95 |
| Total valid votes | | 138,507 | | |
| Registered electors | | 283,526 | | ▲119.43 |
| NCP gain from SS | | Swing | ▼6.30 | |

=== Assembly Election 2004 ===
2004 Maharashtra Legislative Assembly election : Worli
| Party | Candidate | Votes | % | ±% |
|---|---|---|---|---|
| SS | Nalawade Datta Shankar | 30,106 | 44.13 | ▲0.18 |
| NCP | Kudatarkar Vijay Bhau | 21,012 | 30.80 | ▲4.64 |
| ABS | Ahir Vijay Gulab (Gawli) | 15,083 | 22.11 | ▲20.91 |
| BSP | Vishwanath Jagannath Jagtap | 1,027 | 1.51 | New |
| Independent | Dr. Shivnarayan Dubey | 452 | 0.66 | New |
| Margin of victory | | 9,094 | 13.33 | ▼4.47 |
| Turnout | | 68,228 | 52.80 | ▲6.70 |
| Total valid votes | | 68,224 | | |
| Registered electors | | 129,208 | | ▼3.02 |
| SS hold | | Swing | ▲0.18 | |

=== Assembly Election 1999 ===
1999 Maharashtra Legislative Assembly election : Worli
| Party | Candidate | Votes | % | ±% |
|---|---|---|---|---|
| SS | Dattaji Nalawade | 26,993 | 43.95 | ▼13.33 |
| NCP | Vijay Bhau Kudtarkar | 16,063 | 26.15 | New |
| INC | Dr. Vijaya Patil | 15,308 | 24.92 | ▼7.59 |
| JD(U) | Amarbahadur Sitaram Pasi | 1,580 | 2.57 | New |
| ABS | T. C. Chavan | 736 | 1.20 | New |
| Independent | Chougule P. H. | 494 | 0.80 | New |
| Margin of victory | | 10,930 | 17.80 | ▼6.97 |
| Turnout | | 61,437 | 46.12 | ▼19.37 |
| Total valid votes | | 61,418 | | |
| Registered electors | | 133,225 | | ▲0.33 |
| SS hold | | Swing | ▼13.33 | |

=== Assembly Election 1995 ===
1995 Maharashtra Legislative Assembly election : Worli
| Party | Candidate | Votes | % | ±% |
|---|---|---|---|---|
| SS | Dattaji Nalawade | 49,802 | 57.28 | ▲14.70 |
| INC | Adv. Vasantrao Vittal Suryawanshi | 28,267 | 32.51 | ▲2.55 |
| Independent | Dawane Santoo Bhagoji | 4,916 | 5.65 | New |
| JD | Walekar Laxman Ganpat | 2,236 | 2.57 | ▼23.60 |
| Independent | Gajjal Ramdas | 786 | 0.90 | New |
| Independent | Namdeo Sahdeo More | 542 | 0.62 | New |
| Margin of victory | | 21,535 | 24.77 | ▲12.14 |
| Turnout | | 88,432 | 66.59 | ▲7.68 |
| Total valid votes | | 86,938 | | |
| Registered electors | | 132,793 | | ▲3.05 |
| SS hold | | Swing | ▲14.70 | |

=== Assembly Election 1990 ===
1990 Maharashtra Legislative Assembly election : Worli
| Party | Candidate | Votes | % | ±% |
|---|---|---|---|---|
| SS | Nalawade Datta Shankar | 31,718 | 42.59 | New |
| INC | Nanaware Vasant Pandurang | 22,312 | 29.96 | ▼4.36 |
| JD | Vinita Datta Samant | 19,489 | 26.17 | New |
| Margin of victory | | 9,406 | 12.63 | ▲1.92 |
| Turnout | | 75,293 | 58.43 | ▼2.20 |
| Total valid votes | | 74,475 | | |
| Registered electors | | 128,864 | | ▲27.00 |
| SS gain from Independent | | Swing | ▼2.44 | |

=== Assembly Election 1985 ===
1985 Maharashtra Legislative Assembly election : Worli
| Party | Candidate | Votes | % | ±% |
|---|---|---|---|---|
| Independent | Vinita Datta Samant | 27,412 | 45.03 | New |
| INC | Vasant Pandurang Nanaware | 20,892 | 34.32 | New |
| BJP | Datta Rane | 9,357 | 15.37 | ▼2.48 |
| Independent | K. K. Ghodke | 1,294 | 2.13 | New |
| Independent | Chavan Samhbajirao Bhanudas | 1,223 | 2.01 | New |
| Margin of victory | | 6,520 | 10.71 | ▼9.63 |
| Turnout | | 61,586 | 60.69 | ▲17.01 |
| Total valid votes | | 60,876 | | |
| Registered electors | | 101,469 | | ▼11.63 |
| Independent gain from INC(I) | | Swing | ▼5.30 | |

=== Assembly Election 1980 ===
1980 Maharashtra Legislative Assembly election : Worli
| Party | Candidate | Votes | % | ±% |
|---|---|---|---|---|
| INC(I) | Sharad Dighe | 24,841 | 50.33 | ▲32.36 |
| CPI(M) | Kurane Pralhad Krushna | 14,803 | 29.99 | ▼22.67 |
| BJP | Kinare Panduran Rajaram | 8,809 | 17.85 | New |
| JP(S) | Bijjamaster V. V. | 642 | 1.30 | New |
| Margin of victory | | 10,038 | 20.34 | ▼14.35 |
| Turnout | | 49,946 | 43.50 | ▼21.03 |
| Total valid votes | | 49,358 | | |
| Registered electors | | 114,828 | | ▲3.31 |
| INC(I) gain from CPI(M) | | Swing | ▼2.33 | |

=== Assembly Election 1978 ===
1978 Maharashtra Legislative Assembly election : Worli
| Party | Candidate | Votes | % | ±% |
|---|---|---|---|---|
| CPI(M) | Kurane Pralhad Krushna | 37,466 | 52.66 | ▲46.79 |
| INC(I) | Vasant Pandurang Nanaware | 12,786 | 17.97 | New |
| SS | Balkrishna Raghunath Gawade | 10,693 | 15.03 | ▼3.59 |
| INC | Sharad Dighe | 9,622 | 13.52 | ▼40.39 |
| Margin of victory | | 24,680 | 34.69 | ▼0.60 |
| Turnout | | 72,353 | 65.10 | ▼3.76 |
| Total valid votes | | 71,148 | | |
| Registered electors | | 111,146 | | ▲6.87 |
| CPI(M) gain from INC | | Swing | ▼1.25 | |

=== Assembly Election 1972 ===
1972 Maharashtra Legislative Assembly election : Worli
| Party | Candidate | Votes | % | ±% |
|---|---|---|---|---|
| INC | Sharad Dighe | 38,000 | 53.91 | ▲15.6 |
| SS | Nalawade Datta Shankar | 13,126 | 18.62 | New |
| CPI | Mani Shankar N. Kavthe | 6,785 | 9.63 | New |
| Independent | Bapu Chandra Sen Kamble | 6,080 | 8.63 | New |
| CPI(M) | P. K. Kurne | 4,134 | 5.86 | ▼25.72 |
| RPI(K) | Anandrao Ravji Mane | 1,825 | 2.59 | New |
| Margin of victory | | 24,874 | 35.29 | ▲28.56 |
| Turnout | | 71,736 | 68.98 | ▲4.89 |
| Total valid votes | | 70,487 | | |
| Registered electors | | 104,000 | | ▲10.19 |
| INC hold | | Swing | ▲15.60 | |

=== Assembly Election 1967 ===
1967 Maharashtra Legislative Assembly election : Worli
| Party | Candidate | Votes | % | ±% |
|---|---|---|---|---|
| INC | Madhav Narayan Birje | 22,743 | 38.32 | ▼5.07 |
| CPI(M) | P. K. Kurane | 18,748 | 31.59 | New |
| Independent | V. B. Worlikar | 9,448 | 15.92 | New |
| Independent | B. C. Kamble | 6,805 | 11.46 | New |
| Independent | S. B. Chavan | 1,143 | 1.93 | New |
| Independent | G. S. Pawar | 470 | 0.79 | New |
| Margin of victory | | 3,995 | 6.73 | ▼4.16 |
| Turnout | | 63,025 | 66.78 | ▲1.94 |
| Total valid votes | | 59,357 | | |
| Registered electors | | 94,383 | | ▲3.82 |
| INC hold | | Swing | ▼5.07 | |

=== Assembly Election 1962 ===
1962 Maharashtra Legislative Assembly election : Worli
| Party | Candidate | Votes | % | ±% |
|---|---|---|---|---|
| INC | Madhav Narayan Birje | 24,041 | 43.39 | ▲8.83 |
| RPI | Vithal Yashwant Mohite | 18,008 | 32.50 | New |
| Independent | Sadashirao Maruti Bandisode | 6,232 | 11.25 | New |
| ABJS | Sambhajirao Bhanudas Chavan | 5,132 | 9.26 | New |
| Socialist Party (India) | Tajbhahadursinha Kailas Sinha Singh | 1,659 | 2.99 | New |
| Margin of victory | | 6,033 | 10.89 | ▼19.99 |
| Turnout | | 57,219 | 62.94 | ▼9.91 |
| Total valid votes | | 55,407 | | |
| Registered electors | | 90,906 | | ▲28.20 |
| INC gain from SCF | | Swing | ▼22.05 | |

=== Assembly Election 1957 ===
1957 Bombay State Legislative Assembly election : Worli
| Party | Candidate | Votes | % | ±% |
|---|---|---|---|---|
| SCF | Bhandare Ramchandra Dhondiba | 32,882 | 65.44 | New |
| INC | Matkar Waman Shankar | 17,365 | 34.56 | New |
| Margin of victory | | 15,517 | 30.88 | New |
| Turnout | | 50,247 | 70.86 | New |
| Total valid votes | | 50,247 | | |
| Registered electors | | 70,908 | | New |
| SCF gain from INC | | Swing | | |
