= Mazgaon Assembly constituency =

Former constituency of the Maharashtra legislative assembly in India

Mazgaon
- Former constituency for the Maharashtra Legislative Assembly

Constituency details
- Country: India
- Region: Western India
- State: Maharashtra
- Lok Sabha constituency: Mumbai South Central
- Established: 1952
- Abolished: 2008

Mazgaon was one of the constituencies of Maharashtra Vidhan Sabha, in India. It was a segment of the Mumbai South Central Lok Sabha constituency. Mazgaon seat's last election was in 2004 and it was defunct from 2009.

== Members of Vidhan Sabha ==
Year	Member	Party
From 1952 - 1957 see: Mazgaon Ghodapdeo
1952	Mascarenhas Mafaldo Ubaldo	Indian National Congress
1957	Anande Deorao Laxman	Independent politician
1962	Vithal Krishnaji Torasakar	Indian National Congress
1967	Vithal Krishnaji Torasakar	Indian National Congress
1972	Vithal Krishnaji Torasakar	Indian National Congress
1978	Kamat Dinanath Gajanan	Janata Party
1980	Atmaram Tukaram Bhosale Alias Bhai Bhosale	Indian National Congress (I)
1985	Chhagan Bhujbal	Independent politician
1990	Chhagan Bhujbal	Shiv Sena
1995	Bala Nandgaonkar	Shiv Sena
1999	Bala Nandgaonkar	Shiv Sena
2004	Bala Nandgaonkar	Shiv Sena

== Election results ==
=== Assembly Election 2004 ===
2004 Maharashtra Legislative Assembly election : Mazgaon
Party	Candidate	Votes	%	±%
SS	Bala Nandgaonkar	27,684	42.91%	▼6.09
NCP	Pankaj Bhujbal	26,212	40.63%	▲19.86
SP	Parasbhai Porwal	7,888	12.23%	New
CPI	Ghagare Narayan Sakharam	1,074	1.66%	▼4.89
Margin of victory		1,472	2.28%	▼25.95
Turnout		64,513	55.85%	▲11.86
Total valid votes		64,510		
Registered electors		1,15,505		▼9.80
SS hold		Swing	▼6.09	

=== Assembly Election 1999 ===
1999 Maharashtra Legislative Assembly election : Mazgaon
Party	Candidate	Votes	%	±%
SS	Bala Nandgaonkar	27,605	49.00%	▼4.03
NCP	Sunita Subhash Shinde	11,701	20.77%	New
INC	Murai Rambachan Sitaram	11,435	20.30%	▼17.14
CPI	Ghagare Narayan Sakharam	3,690	6.55%	▼2.09
Independent	M. Gunashegar Murgan	572	1.02%	New
Independent	Shaikh Abdul Karim Usman	461	0.82%	New
JD(U)	Vinay Anant Gaikawad	379	0.67%	New
Margin of victory		15,904	28.23%	▲12.63
Turnout		56,334	43.99%	▼20.43
Total valid votes		56,334		
Registered electors		1,28,058		▲4.85
SS hold		Swing	▼4.03	

=== Assembly Election 1995 ===
1995 Maharashtra Legislative Assembly election : Mazgaon
Party	Candidate	Votes	%	±%
SS	Bala Nandgaonkar	41,729	53.04%	▲2.24
INC	Chhagan Bhujbal	29,454	37.43%	▼4.18
CPI	Ghagare Narayan Sakharam	6,799	8.64%	New
Margin of victory		12,275	15.60%	▲6.42
Turnout		80,016	65.51%	▲8.04
Total valid votes		78,682		
Registered electors		1,22,138		▼4.91
SS hold		Swing	▲2.24	

=== Assembly Election 1990 ===
1990 Maharashtra Legislative Assembly election : Mazgaon
Party	Candidate	Votes	%	±%
SS	Chhagan Bhujbal	36,790	50.80%	New
INC	Eknath (Bhai) Bandal	30,141	41.62%	▲15.47
JD	Borade Tukaram Sakharam	5,004	6.91%	New
Margin of victory		6,649	9.18%	▲7.25
Turnout		73,308	57.07%	▲2.53
Total valid votes		72,424		
Registered electors		1,28,448		▲10.76
SS gain from Independent		Swing	▲21.16	

=== Assembly Election 1985 ===
1985 Maharashtra Legislative Assembly election : Mazgaon
Party	Candidate	Votes	%	±%
Independent	Chhagan Bhujbal	18,510	29.64%	New
Independent	T. S. Borade	17,307	27.71%	New
INC	Atmaram Tukaram Bhosale Alias Bhai Bhosale	16,329	26.15%	New
BJP	Chandrakant Narayan Jagtap	9,869	15.80%	▼7.76
Margin of victory		1,203	1.93%	▼17.72
Turnout		63,284	54.57%	▲8.83
Total valid votes		62,447		
Registered electors		1,15,965		▲16.72
Independent gain from INC(I)		Swing	▼13.57	

=== Assembly Election 1980 ===
1980 Maharashtra Legislative Assembly election : Mazgaon
Party	Candidate	Votes	%	±%
INC(I)	Atmaram Tukaram Bhosale Alias Bhai Bhosale	19,327	43.21%	▲30.12
BJP	Chandrakant Narayan Jagtap	10,539	23.56%	New
INC(U)	Bhosale Ravindra Laxman	8,355	18.68%	New
JP	Manjrekar Vilas Shankar	6,508	14.55%	▼32.58
Margin of victory		8,788	19.65%	▼7.61
Turnout		45,276	45.57%	▼19.77
Total valid votes		44,729		
Registered electors		99,349		▲0.71
INC(I) gain from JP		Swing	▼3.92	

=== Assembly Election 1978 ===
1978 Maharashtra Legislative Assembly election : Mazgaon
Party	Candidate	Votes	%	±%
JP	Kamat Dinanath Gajanan	30,120	47.13%	New
INC	Bhosale Atmaram Tukaram	12,698	19.87%	▼44.98
SS	Padaval Harishchandra Pandurang	12,192	19.08%	▲4.35
INC(I)	Bhapse Bahurao	8,367	13.09%	New
Independent	Chavan Tatoba Yallappa	456	0.71%	New
Margin of victory		17,422	27.26%	▼22.87
Turnout		64,850	65.74%	▲6.91
Total valid votes		63,913		
Registered electors		98,645		▲22.25
JP gain from INC		Swing	▼17.72	

=== Assembly Election 1972 ===
1972 Maharashtra Legislative Assembly election : Mazgaon
Party	Candidate	Votes	%	±%
INC	Toraskar Krishnaji	30,290	64.85%	▲20.00
SS	Bhai Shingre	6,876	14.72%	New
INC(O)	Mohandas Thakurdas	6,572	14.07%	New
RPI	Pawar Damodar Bechar	1,873	4.01%	▼19.02
Independent	Malwe Nawnath Dadu	1,097	2.35%	New
Margin of victory		23,414	50.13%	▲28.31
Turnout		47,769	59.20%	▼4.85
Total valid votes		46,708		
Registered electors		80,692		▲8.62
INC hold		Swing	▲20.00	

=== Assembly Election 1967 ===
1967 Maharashtra Legislative Assembly election : Mazgaon
Party	Candidate	Votes	%	±%
INC	Vithal Krishnaji Torasakar	20,903	44.85%	▼2.51
RPI	R. G. Kharat	10,734	23.03%	New
Independent	L. B. Melville	9,658	20.72%	New
SWA	M. L. Parulekar	2,612	5.60%	▼11.98
Independent	N. Y. Tambe	1,825	3.92%	New
Independent	H. M. Ratkav	397	0.85%	New
Margin of victory		10,169	21.82%	▲4.01
Turnout		49,233	66.27%	▲3.54
Total valid votes		46,604		
Registered electors		74,289		▲5.95
INC hold		Swing	▼2.51	

=== Assembly Election 1962 ===
1962 Maharashtra Legislative Assembly election : Mazgaon
Party	Candidate	Votes	%	±%
INC	Vithal Krishnaji Torasakar	19,654	47.36%	▲7.84
CPI	Ramchandr Krishnaji Bhogale	12,263	29.55%	New
SWA	Keshao Babu Mohite	7,297	17.58%	New
ABJS	Marutirao Bhaurao Avate	2,287	5.51%	New
Margin of victory		7,391	17.81%	▼3.15
Turnout		43,028	61.37%	▼4.32
Total valid votes		41,501		
Registered electors		70,114		▲17.50
INC gain from Independent		Swing	▼13.12	

=== Assembly Election 1957 ===
1957 Bombay State Legislative Assembly election : Mazgaon
Party	Candidate	Votes	%	±%
Independent	Anande Deorao Laxman	22,920	60.48%	New
INC	Borkar Keshav Laxman	14,978	39.52%	New
Margin of victory		7,942	20.96%	
Turnout		37,898	63.51%	
Total valid votes		37,898		
Registered electors		59,669		
Independent win (new seat)				

== See also ==
- List of constituencies of Maharashtra Legislative Assembly
