= Bala Nandgaonkar =

Indian politician

Member of Maharashtra Legislative Assembly
- In office (2009–2014)
- Succeeded by: Ajay Choudhari
- Constituency: Shivadi
- In office (1995-1999), (1999-2004), (2004 – 2009)
- Preceded by: Chhagan Bhujbal
- Constituency: Mazgaon

Personal details
- Born: 21 June 1957 (age 69)
- Party: Maharashtra Navnirman Sena (2006-Present)
- Other political affiliations: Shiv Sena(1966–2006)
- Occupation: Politician

Bala Dagdu Nandgaonkar (b 1957) is an Indian politician from Maharashtra. He started his political career with Shiv Sena and later joined Raj Thackeray's Maharashtra Navnirman Sena. He is a three-term member of the Maharashtra Legislative Assembly from Mazgaon assembly constituency. He got the ticket for the 4th time from Shivadi to contest against Ajay Chaudhari of Shiv Sena(UBT) in the 2024 Vidhan Sabha Elections.

== Early political life ==
Bala Nandgaonkar was first elected to the Maharashtra Legislative Assembly on a Shiv Sena ticket in 1995 from Mazgaon, and won again in 1999 and 2004. He was elected to Vidhan Sabha in 2009 from Shivadi on MNS ticket but lost in 2014.

== Maharashtra Navnirman Sena ==
Bala Nandgaonkar was one of the driving forces along with Raj Thackeray to form the Maharashtra Navnirman Sena.

== Positions held ==
- Maharashtra Legislative Assembly MLA
- Terms in office: 1995 to 1999, 1999–2004, 2004–2009 and 2009–2014.
