= Dattaji Nalawade =

Indian politician

The Honorable Dattaji Nalawade

Speaker of the Maharashtra Legislative Assembly
- In office 1995–1999

Mayor of Mumbai, Maharashtra
- In office 1986–1987

Member of Legislative Assembly of Maharashtra
- In office 1990–2009

Personal details
- Party: Shiv Sena
- Occupation: Politician

Dattaji Nalawade was an Indian politician and leader of Shiv Sena. He was a mayor of Mumbai and speaker of Maharashtra Legislative Assembly. He represented the Worli Vidhan Sabha constituency from 1990 to 2009. He was the Mayor of Mumbai in 1986.

== Death ==
Dattaji Nalawade died in Jaslok Hospital, Mumbai on 15 Feb 2013 aged 77 after critical lung infections.

== Positions held ==
- 1986: Mayor of Mumbai
- 1990: Elected to Maharashtra Legislative Assembly (1st term)
- 1995: Elected to Maharashtra Legislative Assembly (2nd term)
- 1995-99: Speaker of the Maharashtra Legislative Assembly
- 1999: Elected to Maharashtra Legislative Assembly (3rd term)
- 2004: Elected to Maharashtra Legislative Assembly (4th term)
