= Deendayal Gupta =

Indian independence activist and politician

Member of Madhya Pradesh Vidhan Sabha
- In office 1952-1957

Member of Maharashtra Vidhan Sabha
- In office 1957-1960

Minister of Food
- In office 1952-1956 (Madhya Pradesh)

Minister of Food, Rehabilitation, Social Welfare
- In office 1956-1957 (Bombay State)

Personal details
- Born: 1909
- Party: Indian National Congress
- Children: Dr Chitra Gupta Toor, Son in Law - Mr Prithviraj Toor, Grand children - Nilambari Gupta and Tejasvaraj Toor

Deendayal Gupta (1909 – after 1957) was an Indian independence activist and politician affiliated with the Indian National Congress (INC), who was elected to the Madhya Pradesh Legislative Assembly (Vidhan Sabha) in 1952. He served as Minister of Food of Madhya Pradesh in the Ravishankar Shukla government. He also served as Food, Rehabilitation & Social Welfare Minister of Bombay State from 1956 to 1957. In 1957, he was elected to the Maharashtra Legislative Assembly and served as its Vice President.
