= Rahul Narwekar =

Indian politician (born 1977)

- Narwekar in 2023

Speaker of Maharashtra Legislative Assembly
- Incumbent
- Assumed office 3 July 2022
- Governor: Bhagat Singh Koshyari; Ramesh Bais; C. P. Radhakrishnan; Acharya Devvrat; Jishnu Dev Varma
- Deputy: Narhari Sitaram Zirwal; Anna Bansode
- Preceded by: Nana Patole; Narhari Sitaram Zirwal (acting)

Member of Maharashtra Legislative Assembly
- Incumbent
- Assumed office 2019
- Preceded by: Raj K. Purohit
- Constituency: Colaba

Member of Maharashtra Legislative Council
- In office 10 June 2014 – 2019
- Constituency: Nominated by the Governor

Personal details
- Born: 11 February 1977 (age 49) Mumbai, Maharashtra, India
- Party: Bharatiya Janata Party (since 2019)
- Other political affiliations: Nationalist Congress Party (2014–2019); Shiv Sena (till 2014)
- Spouse: Sarojini Naik Nimbalkar (m. 2012)
- Children: 2 daughters
- Education: Bachelor of Commerce; Bachelor of Law
- Occupation: Lawyer; politician
- Website: rahulnarwekar.com

Rahul Narwekar (born 11 February 1977) is an Indian politician and member of the Bharatiya Janata Party. He is currently the MLA from the Colaba Assembly constituency and the 16th Speaker of the Maharashtra Legislative Assembly since 2022. Narwekar was elected to the Maharashtra Legislative Council in June 2016 as a Governor Nominated member. He is the second-youngest (aged 44) person to be elected speaker of any state in the country, the youngest being Shivraj Patil (aged 42). In May 2023, he completed a 4-day UK tour speaking at the Ideas for India Conference organised by Bridge India in London,speaking with students at Cambridge University. His tour attracted media attention because of its proximity to the Supreme Court judgement on the disqualification of 16 MLAs of the Eknath Shinde-led Shiv Sena. In November 2024 he was re-elected on a Bharatiya Janata Party ticket as a member of the Maharashtra Legislative Assembly from the Colaba constituency and won by a huge margin.

== Personal life ==
Rahul Narwekar is the son-in-law of senior NCP leader Ramraje Naik Nimbalkar. Rahul's father, Suresh Narwekar was a Municipal Councillor from the Colaba area. Rahul's brother Makarand Narwekar is a second-term Municipal Councillor, currently from Ward No. 227. His sister-in-law Harshita Narwekar is also a Municipal Councillor on a Bharatiya Janata Party ticket from the Cuffe Parade area.

== Political career ==
Narwekar began his political career with the Shiv Sena party, where he served as a spokesperson for the youth wing. After 15 years with the Shiv Sena, Narwekar left the party in 2014 when he was denied a ticket for the Lok Sabha election. He then joined the Nationalist Congress Party (NCP) and contested the 2014 Lok Sabha election from the Maval constituency but was unsuccessful. In June 2016, Narwekar was elected to the Maharashtra Legislative Council as a Governor Nominated member. In 2019, Narwekar switched to the Bharatiya Janata Party (BJP) and successfully contested the Maharashtra Legislative Assembly election from the Colaba constituency, winning by 16,195 votes (57,420 total votes in his favour). On July 3, 2022, Narwekar was elected as the Speaker of the Maharashtra Legislative Assembly. At the age of 45, he became the youngest person to be elected as Speaker of any state legislature in India. In May 2023, Narwekar was tasked by the Supreme Court of India about deciding on the disqualification petitions of 34 MLAs from the two factions of Shiv Sena that emerged after the party split in 2022. In November 2024, he was re-elected as a member of the Maharashtra Legislative Assembly from the Colaba constituency, winning by a massive margin of 48,581 votes totalling 68.49% vote share (81,085 votes) of all votes polled (1,18,389). He was also re appointed the speaker of the Legislative Assembly.

Year	Party	Position/Event
1999–2014	Shiv Sena	Spokesperson for youth wing
2014	Nationalist Congress Party	Joined NCP after being denied Lok Sabha ticket by Shiv Sena
2014	Nationalist Congress Party	Unsuccessfully contested Lok Sabha election from Maval constituency
2016	Nationalist Congress Party	Elected to Maharashtra Legislative Council as Governor's Nominated member
2019	Bharatiya Janata Party	Joined BJP
2019	Bharatiya Janata Party	Elected as MLA from Colaba
2022	Bharatiya Janata Party	Elected as Speaker of Maharashtra Legislative Assembly
2023	Bharatiya Janata Party	Tasked by Supreme Court to decide on disqualification petitions of Shiv Sena MLAs
2024	Bharatiya Janata Party	Re-elected as MLA from Colaba Re-elected as Speaker of Maharashtra Legislative Assembly

== See also ==
- Anish Gawande
