= Shakti Mills gang rape =

August 2013 gang rape in Mumbai, India

2013 Mumbai gang rape
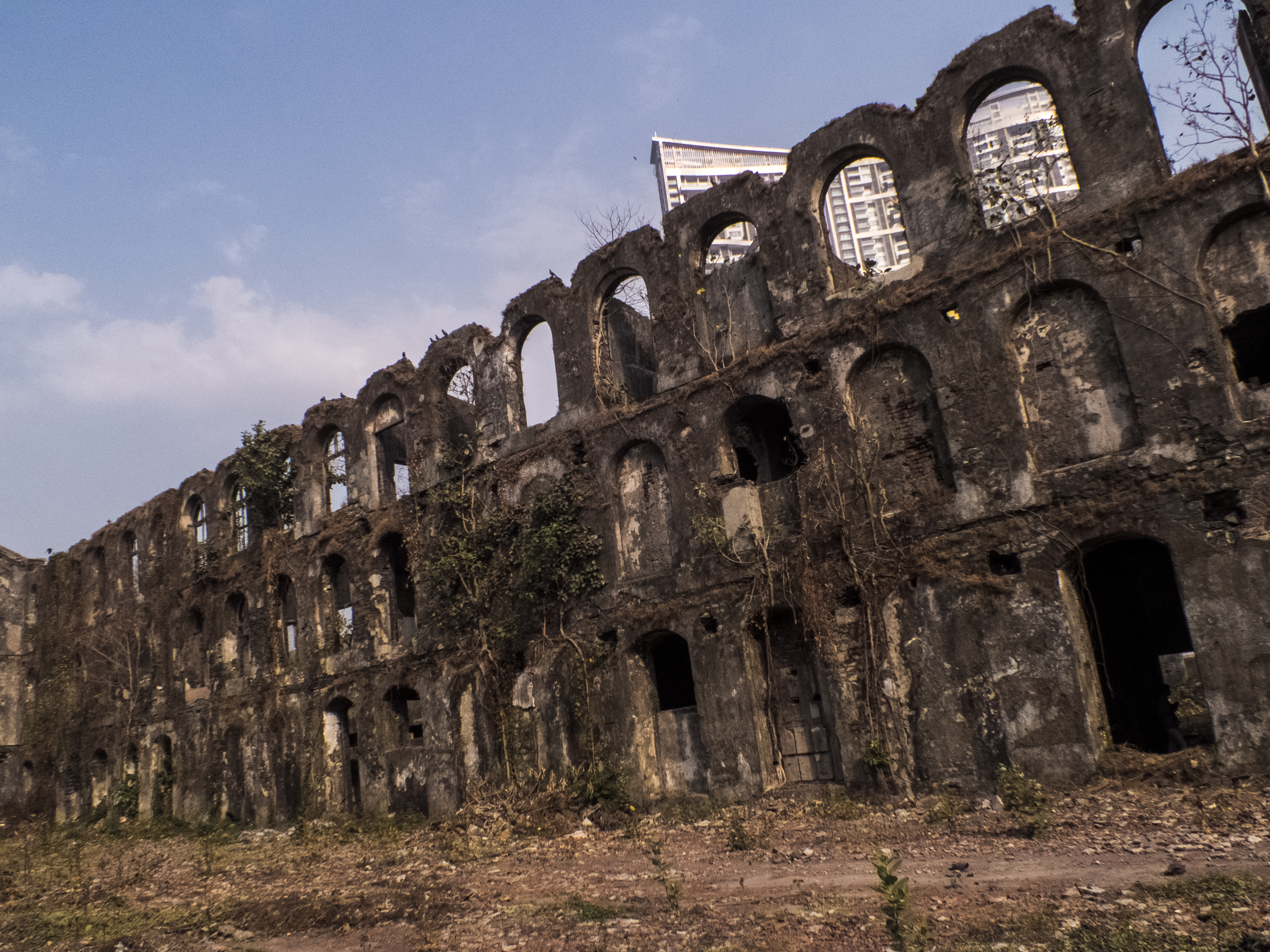
- A view of the decrepit Shakti Mills compound.
- Date: 22 August 2013
- Time: 6:54 pm IST (UTC+05:30)
- Location: Shakti Mills compound, Mahalaxmi, Mumbai, Maharashtra, India
- Also known as: Shakti Mills gang rape
- Injuries: 2 (female and male victim)
- Convicted: Mohammed Kasim Hafiz Shaikh alias Kasim; Mohammed Salim Ansari; Vijay Jadhav; Siraj Rehman Khan alias Sirju; Mohammed Ashfaq Sheikh; 2 unnamed juveniles
- Verdict: 3 get death penalty (commuted to life imprisonment); 1 gets life imprisonment 2 juveniles get 3 years in reform school
- Convictions: 13 counts; including gang rape, unnatural sex, assault, wrongful restraint, criminal conspiracy, criminal intimidation, common intention, destruction of evidence, and certain Sections of the Information Technology Act

The 2013 Mumbai gang rape, also known as the Shakti Mills gang rape, refers to the incident in which a 22-year-old photojournalist, who was interning with an English magazine in Mumbai, was gang-raped by five people, including a juvenile. The incident occurred on 22 August 2013, when she had gone to the deserted Shakti Mills compound, near Mahalaxmi in Mumbai, with a male colleague on an assignment. The accused had tied up the victim's colleague with belts and raped her. The accused took photos of the victim during the sexual assault, and threatened to release them to social networks if she reported the rape. Later, an eighteen-year-old call centre employee reported that she too had been gang-raped, on 31 July 2013, inside the mills complex.

On 20 March 2014, a Mumbai sessions court convicted all five adult accused in both cases on 13 counts. On 4 April 2014, the court awarded the death penalty to the three repeat offenders in the photojournalist rape case. For the other two accused, one was awarded life imprisonment, while the other accused turned approver in the case. Two minors, one in each case, were tried by the Juvenile Justice Board separately. They were convicted on 15 July 2015, and sentenced to three years (including time in custody) in a Nashik reform school, the maximum punishment that a juvenile offender can receive under Indian law.

The Bombay High Court commuted the three death sentences to imprisonment for the remainder of their natural life on 25 November 2021.

== Incident ==
A 22-year-old photojournalist working in Mumbai was gang raped by five people at the Shakti Mills compound, where she had gone on assignment with a male colleague on 22 August 2013. According to the statements given to the police by the two victims, the photojournalist and her colleague left their office at 5:00 pm on an assignment to take some photographs of the deserted Shakti Mills compound. Five men tied up the male colleague and took turns raping the photojournalist while holding a broken beer bottle to her neck to keep her from shouting for help. The rapists then forced the victim to clean the crime scene, and took two photos of her on a cellphone, threatening to release the photos on social networks if she reported the attack.

Following the assault, the men brought her back to the place where her colleague was being held. They accompanied the survivor and her colleague to the railway tracks around 7:15 pm, where they were told to stay. When the criminals left, she informed her colleague that she had been raped six times by the five men and needed medical treatment. On reaching the Mahalaxmi railway station, her colleague contacted their boss and asked him to come. They went by taxi to Jaslok Hospital on Gopalrao Deshmukh Marg. The victim called her mother and told her to meet her at the hospital. The survivor was bleeding profusely when she arrived at the hospital. She was immediately admitted and began undergoing medical treatment. She gave her statement to police on 26 August, and was discharged on the night of 27 August.

In a statement to the media from her hospital bed, the victim said, "I want no other woman in this city and country to go through such a brutal physical humiliation. Perpetrators should be punished severely as they have ruined my life. No punishment short of a life term will take away my pain and humiliation and physical abuse I underwent. Rape is not the end of life. I will continue fighting." The victim also expressed her eagerness to return to work, stating, "I want to join duty as early as possible." Nirmala Samant Prabhavalkar, a member of the National Commission for Women who met the victim at the hospital, stated: "She is recuperating from her injuries and trauma. She is still not completely out of trauma but she is composed."

On 3 September, a 19-year-old telephone operator with a private firm reported to authorities that she had been gang raped at the Shakti Mills compound by five men on 31 July 2013. Three of the men involved were also accused in the photojournalist's case. The victim had gone to the Shakti Mills compound with her boyfriend, where they were approached by the accused. Similar to the photojournalist case, the men tied and beat up the victim's male companion, before gang raping her. The two victims fled to Chhattisgarh following the incident, without reporting it, out of fear. Mumbai Police made the telephone operator undergo a "two-finger test", a check for a hymen as proof of sexual activity. This occurred despite a Maharashtra Government Resolution (GR) on 10 May 2013 which ordered that the test no longer be conducted stating, "The procedure (finger test) is degrading, crude and medically and scientifically irrelevant ... Information about past sexual conduct has been considered irrelevant."

== Arrests ==
As the report was received, Mumbai Police formed 20 teams and officers from 12 crime branch units and 16 police stations were involved in the case. Police detained 20 men after the victim lodged a complaint following the attack. All five accused in the photojournalist case were arrested by Mumbai Police in about 65 hours after the complaint was registered around 8:30 pm on 22 August. The accused in the gang rape of the photojournalist were Vijay Jadhav, Siraj Rehman Khan alias Sirju, Chand Shaikh, Mohamed Kasim Hafiz Sheikh alias Kasim, and Mohammed Salim Ansari. The accused in the gang rape of the telephone operator were Vijay Jadhav, Mohamed Kasim Hafiz Sheikh, Mohammed Salim Ansari, Mohammed Ashfaq Sheikh (26) and an unnamed minor.

Chand Shaikh was the first to be arrested. He was arrested in the early hours of 23 August from his residence in the Dhobi Ghat slum in Saat Raasta. He sold vegetables along with his grandmother for a living. Vijay Jadhav (aged 19) was the second accused to be arrested. He was sleeping at a video club at Dagad Chawl in Madanpura, when he was arrested by police at around 3:00 am on 24 August. He resided with a friend on Ramji Barucha Marg behind Dhobi Ghat at Agripada. His parents, two sisters and two brothers, stayed at a rented flat at Jai Ambe Park in Virar. He had previously been arrested in 2011 for breaking into a house. Siraj Rehman Khan alias Sirju (24) was arrested from a hideout in Govandi on 24 August based on information police obtained from interrogating Shaikh and Jadhav. He worked odd-jobs at shops for a living. Siraj Khan lived on a footpath near Dhobi Ghat at Agripada. His mother was dead, and he had no contact with his father. Siraj Rehman Khan was also an accused in another case in Thane. Television news reports claimed that Siraj Khan, had escaped from the Thane jail where the accused had been detained. This was confirmed by Special Public Prosecutor (SPP) Ujjwal Nikam who stated, "Siraj Rahman Khan, an accused in Shakti Mills gang-rape case of photojournalist, is untraceable." The report was later found to be incorrect.

Qasim Shaikh (21) was arrested at 3:30 am on 25 August, outside Nair Hospital in Agripada. Police received a tipoff at 2:30 am from the relative of a patient admitted at the hospital who identified the accused from police sketches. Following the crime, Qasim Shaikh had returned to his residence at Kalapani in Agripada. He began watching television, when he received a call from a police constable inquiring about his whereabouts. His mother claims that he changed his shirt after receiving the call, then took ₹50 from her and left the house. Salim Ansari (27), who police described as the chief planner of the crime, was the last to be arrested. He was arrested by Delhi Police on the Delhi Haryana border at 11:00 am on 25 August. Ansari had hidden in Govandi following the crime, and fled to Delhi on a long-distance train that he probably boarded from Kurla. Ansari hid at a relative's house in the Bharat Nagar slum, and planned to flee to Nepal. He was arrested by police while out for a walk. An officer stated that he "seemed oblivious to the possibility of the police looking for him. He was calmly going towards his relative's place when a police team of four swooped down on him." The Times of India reported that Mumbai Police used mobile phone tracking to locate Ansari, and told Delhi Police where to find him. He was produced before a Delhi court, and brought back to Mumbai on 25 August.

== Trial ==
On 19 September 2013, the Mumbai crime branch filed charges against the four adults, and the report on charges against a minor delinquent was given to the juvenile court. The accused were charged under various sections of Indian Penal Code (IPC), including 376(d) for Gang rape, 377 for unnatural offence, 120(b) for criminal conspiracy, sections 342 and 343 for wrongful restraint, section 506(2) for criminal intimidation and 34 for common intention and 201 for destruction of evidence. The sessions court ordered the prosecution to start trail proceedings in the case from 14 October 2013. The prosecution wanted to add a charge under section 67A of Information Technology Act, 2000 (punishment for publishing or transmitting of material containing sexually explicit act in electronic form). This charge of section 67A is only against Ansari as he was the one who showed porn clips to survivor. Shalini Phansalkar-Joshi was the Principal Sessions judge of the fast track sessions court which hearing both cases. The court informed special public prosecutor Ujjwal Nikam that since the matter is on fast track, the trial should be completed within 60 days. The court further held that the trial in the case would run on regular basis.

On 14 October 2013, the first day of the trial, three panch (independent) witnesses gave their statements. The photojournalist's mother wept continuously during her two-hour deposition before the sessions court on 15 October. The photojournalist's boss also made his deposition the same day. The proceedings were held "in-camera" on the second and third days.

On 17 October, the 22-year-old photojournalist deposed in the court in front of four of her assaulters, and identified them during a four-hour deposition.

The telephone operator deposed before the court on 30 October. According to Nikam, "As the proceedings began in the morning, the girl started weeping. She was trembling. Assuming that she was afraid of the accused, the judge ordered that a partition be put up between them. She still could not stop weeping. I told the court that she is a brave girl and she would give her statement. After some time, she regained her composure. She said she would talk about her ordeal. She then recognised four of the five accused present in the court." The friend of the telephone operator who accompanied her to the mill when the gang rape occurred deposed before the court on 20 November 2013. On 13 January 2014, the photojournalist's male colleague testified before the court on-camera, and identified all the accused.

On 15 July 2014, Juvenile Justice Board convicted the two juvenile rapists involved in the crimes and sentenced them to three years at a Nashik reform school. The maximum punishment for a juvenile offender under Indian law is three years, which includes time in custody.

== Verdict and sentencing ==
On 20 March 2014, the sessions court convicted all five adult accused on 13 counts, including Gang rape, destruction of evidence, wrongful restraint, Assault, common intention, unnatural sex, criminal conspiracy of the IPC and certain Sections of the Information Technology Act, 2000. "These accused have a criminal tendency and should be awarded strictest of punishment, which will serve as a deterrent," special public prosecutor Ujjwal Nikam told the court. Vijay Jadhav, Mohammad Qasim Shaikh, and Mohammad Salim Ansari, were convicted in both the gang rape cases, while Siraj Khan and Mohammad Ashfaque Shaikh were found guilty in the photojournalist and telephone operator cases respectively.

On 21 March, the Mumbai sessions court awarded life sentences to four of the accused in the telephone operator case. Principal Sessions judge Shalini Phansalkar-Joshi said, "The manner in which the offence was committed reflects the depravity of the accused. The crime was not an impulsive act, but the premeditated outcome of a criminal conspiracy. They sexually ravished the girl and left her in a pathetic state. A proper signal has to be sent out to society. Even if in this case the accused are not reformed, others like them will be deterred. In some cases, mercy is justified. But in this case it would be misplaced and would be a mockery of justice".

Following the conviction of the three repeat offenders (Vijay Jadhav, Qasim, and Mohammed Salim Ansari) in both gang rapes, on 4 April prosecutor Nikam moved an application to add charges against them under section 376E of the IPC, which provides for the death sentence for repeated rape convictions. The section was introduced by the Criminal Law (Amendment) Act, 2013, in the aftermath of the 2012 Delhi gang rape and murder. Demanding the death penalty, Nikam told the court, "The accused are sex-starved goons in shape of humans. They deserve maximum sentence. Any leniency shown to the accused would be a mockery of justice. Their crime has shocked collective consciousness."

On 4 April 2014, the court awarded the death penalty to the three repeat offenders in the photojournalist rape case. This was the first time that rapists in India were given death sentences under section 376E of the IPC. Siraj Khan, the other convict in the photojournalist case, was sentenced to life imprisonment.

Awarding the death penalty, the judge stated, "Mumbai gang-rape accused have least respect for law. They don't have potential for reformation as per facts of case. The suffering that gang-rape survivor and her family has undergone is unparalleled. Mumbai gang-rape accused were emboldened since law enforcing agencies hadn't caught them. If this is not the case where death sentence prescribed by law is not valid, which is? Exemplary and rarest of rare punishment is required in the case." The judge further added that the crime violated all rights of the survivor. Joshi further observed, "The gang-rape accused were not only enjoying the act of sexual assault but also the survivor's helplessness. It was executed in the most gruesome manner with no mercy or show of human dignity to the survivor. The accused were acting in pursuance of criminal conspiracy as judicially proved. The defence argued that the convicts were "deprived of basic fundamental rights" and that their poor socioeconomic status should be taken into consideration. However, citing judgments by the Supreme Court, the judge stated that "Conviction cannot be dependent on the social and the economic status of the victim or the accused and the race, caste, creed of the accused cannot be taken into consideration." Joshi ruled, "Depravity of their character is reflected from the fact that the accused enjoyed the act. They did not commit the crime under any duress or compulsion. They had enjoyed the act. This was a case, where the accused were completely unprovoked. The judge also rubbished the defence's claims that the victims had suffered no physical injuries. The judge question whether such submissions made it appear like the accused had "done some charity by letting her leave uninjured". The judge further ruled, "This court had an opportunity to understand the trauma as she recalled them at the time of her testimony in the court. Questions like whether she has suffered any injuries are irrelevant and her trauma cannot be overlooked. Her testimony and her mother's deposition in the court clearly tell how heinous the crime was." Rejecting the accused plea for leniency, the judge rule, "A defenseless, harmless victim was raped by the accused unprovoked ... This did not happen because of some momentary lapse." Applauding the victim for her courage, the court observed, "This case would have also gone unreported if the victim had not come ahead and complained to the police. She took a bold step and lodged the complaint. Because of her, this and the other crime the telephone operator case came to light."

=== Commutation of death penalty ===
On 25 November 2021, the Bombay High Court commuted the three death sentences to life imprisonment. A division bench of Justices Sadhana Jadhav and Prithviraj Chavan ruled, "While setting aside the sentence of death penalty, it may appear to the public at large that we play a counter majoritarian role. However, the Constitutional Courts are bound to take into consideration the judicial mandate not by considering just individual rights or the rights of the criminal, but to follow the procedure established by law. At the cost of reiteration, we would observe that Section 376E of the Indian Penal Code is not a substantive offence, but is a punishment contemplated for repeat offenders under section 376D, 376DA, 376DB of Indian Penal Code. We would not take a pedantic approach to mean that it contemplates commission of an offence after the first conviction as under section 75 of the Indian Penal Code. But it would mean that the sentence of death penalty may be awarded in a case which is tried after the first conviction for a similar offence." The Court also noted, "Death puts an end to the whole concept of repentance, any sufferings and mental agony".

The Court also observed, "Although the offence is barbaric and heinous, it cannot be said at the threshold that the accused deserve only death penalty and nothing less than that". However, the Court refused to permit any possibility of release stating, "We are of the opinion that in the facts of the present case, the convicts deserve the punishment of rigorous Imprisonment for life i.e. the whole of the remainder of their natural life in order to repent for the offence committed by them. The convicts in the present case do not deserve to assimilate with the society, as it would be difficult to survive in a society of such men who look upon women with derision, depravity, contempt and objects of desire. The conduct of the accused, and their bold confession to the survivor that she is not the first one to satisfy their lust, is sufficient to hold that there is no scope for reformation or rehabilitation. We therefore, feel that a sentence of rigorous imprisonment for the remainder of their natural life without any remission, parole or furlough would meet the ends of justice."

== Reactions ==
Then Samajwadi Party MLA Naresh Chandra Agrawal sparked a controversy over the brutal Mumbai gang-rape, saying that women needed to pay attention to their clothes to avoid being raped. Agarwal also said that women should not be too influenced by television.

Reacting to the verdict, the mother of the telephone operator, stated, "They deserved death. If there was any harsher punishment than this, their crimes would merit that too. This crime is a blot on society. If rapists like them are set free, it will only encourage molesters and rapists, and send a wrong message to society. Also, it is necessary that equal urgency is shown in all rape and molestation cases. This incident has changed our lives. We live in a locality where word spreads very fast. Some of our neighbours have made our lives hell. They taunt us when we pass. While she has been struggling to overcome the trauma, the local boys have not been letting her do that. She is often chased by youths in the area. When we venture out for family functions, we feel the difference in our relatives' approach towards us." She also added that the quick conviction was only due to the proximity of the 2014 Indian general election.

On 10 April 2014, SP chief Mulayam Singh Yadav said, "When boys and girls have differences, the girl gives a statement that 'the boy raped me,' and that poor boy gets a death sentence." Referring to the Mumbai gang rape he stated, "... later they had differences, and the girl went and gave a statement that I have been raped. And then the poor fellows, three of them have been sentenced to death. Should rape cases lead to hanging? Boys are boys, they make mistakes. Two or three have been given the death sentence in Mumbai."

Complaints were filed against Yadav with the Election Commission of India and the National Commission for Women (NCW). His comments were denounced by the Indian media, women's groups, women's rights activists, public prosecutor in the Shakti Mills gang rape case Ujjwal Nikam, Bollywood celebrities, and a large section of Uttar Pradesh residents. The Times of India stated, "Even by his misogynistic standards, he [Yadav] seems to have sunk to a new low ... The change in the laws was brought on after months of selfless demonstration by citizens striving to bring about a change in India's social outlook. By terming rape as 'just another mistake boys make, Mulayam has just rendered a slap in the face of their effort. The parents of the 2012 Delhi gang rape and murder victim strongly criticized Mulayam and asked people not to vote for his party in the next election. The victim's mother stated, "Raping a girl cannot be called a mistake, it is a crime. A leader who gives such a statement doesn't have any right to be in the power." The remarks were criticized by both Bharatiya Janata Party and Indian National Congress politicians, some of whom also demanded that Mulayam apologize for his statements. Rashtriya Janata Dal President Lalu Prasad Yadav criticized Mulayam stating, "He seems to have lost his mental balance. There is no place for rapists in the society. They deserve strong punishment." Political leaders like Raj Thackeray and then Prime Minister candidate Narendra Modi heavily condemned Yadav for insensitive comments and anti-women views while appearing on Aap Ki Adalat. Mulayam was defended by his daughter-in-law Dimple Yadav, wife of Akhilesh Yadav, who stated that such comments "are made by a lot of people and it happens at time." In the wake of a 2014 Badaun gang rape allegations, Uttar Pradesh on 27 May 2014, United Nations Secretary-General Ban Ki-moon criticised Mulayam Singh's statement saying, "We say no to the dismissive, destructive attitude of 'boys will be boys'." Following Yadav's comments, he and several Samajwadi Party leaders were labeled as "Supporters of Rape and Rapists".

The day following Yadav's comments, SP Maharashtra unit chief Abu Azmi told Mid-Day, "Any woman if, whether married or unmarried, goes along with a man, with or without her consent, should be hanged. Rape is punishable by hanging in Islam. But here, nothing happens to women, only to men. Even the woman is guilty. Girls complain when someone touches them, and even when someone doesn't touch them. It becomes a problem then ... If rape happens with or without consent, it should be punished as prescribed in Islam." He also said, "See, I don't know what context he said it in. But, at times, the wrong people are awarded the death penalty. Boys do it in josh (Hindi: excitement), but what can I say in this? The death sentence should be given. I won't speak against Islam." Azmi's comments were widely criticized in India.

== See also ==
- 2012 Delhi gang rape and murder
- 2014 Badaun gang rape allegations
- Rape in India
- Category:Rape in India
