= Save =

Save, SAVE, or Saved may refer to:

== Places ==
- Save (Garonne), a river in southern France
- Save River (Africa), a river in Zimbabwe and Mozambique
- Sava, a river in Eastern Europe also known as Save
- Savè, Benin, a commune and city
- Save, Rwanda, a settlement
- Säve, a locality in Göteborg Municipality, Västra Götaland County, Sweden
  - Säve Airport
- Esquel Airport (ICAO airport code: SAVE; IATA airport code: EQS), Esquel, Chubut Province, Argentina

== Organizations, groups, companies ==
- Spirit Airlines (NASDAQ stockticker: SAVE), a U.S. airline
- SAVE Dade, LGBTQ+ advocacy group in Florida

=== Charities ===
- Society Against Violence in Education, a non-profit organization working against ragging in India
- Save Britain's Heritage (SAVE), a historic building conservation group in the United Kingdom

== In technology ==
- Saved game, saved progress of a player in a video game
- Computer files are "saved" to achieve persistence

== In media and entertainment ==
=== Music ===
- Saved (Bob Dylan album), 1980, or the song
- Saved (Now, Now album), 2018
- Saved! (Kristin Hayter album), 2023, released under the pseudonym Reverend Kristin Michael Hayter
- Saves (EP), a 2001 EP by Pist.On
- "Saved" (Leiber and Stoller song), a song performed by LaVern Baker and Elvis Presley
- "Saved." (Maaya Sakamoto song), a song by Maaya Sakamoto
- "Saved" (Swans song), 1989
- "Saved" (Ty Dolla Sign song), a song by American singer Ty Dolla Sign
- "Saved", a song by Kutless from Kutless
- "Saved", a song by Labi Siffre from Crying Laughing Loving Lying
- "Saved", a song by Snoop Dogg from Bible of Love
- "Save", a song by the Rocket Summer from the album Do You Feel
- "Save", a song by Tyler Joseph

=== Screen and stage ===
- Saved (play), a 1965 play by Edward Bond
- Saved (TV series), a 2006 television drama
- Saved!, a 2004 film
- Saved (2009 film), an Australian telemovie
- Saved (musical), a musical based on the 2004 film Saved!
- Salvados, a news show on Spanish TV

== In sports ==
- Save (baseball), when a pitcher finishes a game for the winning team under certain prescribed circumstances
- Save (goaltender), when a goalie prevents a goal
- Save, a slang term for sacrifice (bridge), a bid made in the hope than the resulting penalty is less than opponents would score by making their contract

== Other uses ==
- Safeguard American Voter Eligibility Act
- Salvation, being saved or protected from harm or being saved or delivered from some dire situation
- Saving on a Valuable Education, a student loan repayment plan in the United States
- European Union SAVE Programme on energy conservation
- SAVE-study, a survey about the saving behaviour of German households
- Systematic Alien Verification for Entitlements, a program for government and tribal agencies in the United States to verify immigration documents and status of individuals
- Stop Advertising Victims of Exploitation Act of 2014, a US bill on pornography

== See also ==
- Saving
