= Vandana Gawli =

Indian politician

Vandana Gawli is an Indian politician, belonging to the Akhil Bharatiya Sena. She is the sister-in-law of ABS leader Arun Gawli.

She won the Ward 204 seat (Byculla railway station) in the Brihanmumbai Municipal Corporation elections of 2007 and 2012. In 2007, she obtained the largest victory margin of all candidates in the election, with 11,868 votes (a victory margin of 9,512 votes). After the 2012 municipal election, she became the chairperson of the municipal Civic Improvements Committee, which deals with all land reservation issues.
