= FDZ =

FDZ or FdZ may refer to:

- FDZ, creator of 2018 song Wayback featuring Paris Texas (hip-hop group)
- FDZ, abbreviation of Flughafendirektion Zürich, airport directorate which merged to form Flughafen Zürich AG
- FDZ, abbreviation for Research Data Centre, German organization responsible for granting access to the SAVE-study data set
- 103.3 Radio FDZ, a radio station in Germany

== FdZ ==
- FdZ, abbreviation of Führer der Zerstörer, German commander which directed changes to the German destroyer Z51
