= Chinchpokli Assembly constituency =

Constituency of the Maharashtra legislative assembly in India

Coordinates: 18.984°N 72.834°E

Chinchpokli
- Former constituency for the Maharashtra Legislative Assembly

Constituency details
- Country: India
- Region: Western India
- State: Maharashtra
- Lok Sabha constituency: Mumbai South
- Established: 1978
- Abolished: 2008

Chinchpokli Assembly constituency was one of the 288 assembly constituencies of Maharashtra a western state of India. Chinchpokli was also part of Mumbai South Lok Sabha constituency. Chinchpokli existed till 2004 elections until Byculla Assembly constituency was formed in 2008.

== Member of Legislative Assembly ==
Year	Member	Party
1978	Kaviskar Suhas Tulaji	Independent politician
1980	Shaikh Shamim Ahmed	Indian National Congress
1985	Annasaheb Alias B. D. Zute	Indian National Congress
1990	Annasaheb Alias B. D. Zute	Indian National Congress
1995	Faiyaz Ahmed	Janata Dal
1999	Anna Alias Madhukar Chavan	Indian National Congress
2004	Arun Gawli	Akhil Bharatiya Sena

== Election results ==
=== Assembly Election 2004 ===
2004 Maharashtra Legislative Assembly election : Chinchpokli
Party	Candidate	Votes	%	±%
ABS	Arun Gawli	31,964	51.24%	▲49.27
INC	Anna Alias Madhu Chavan	20,146	32.29%	▼3.04
SP	Ansari Mohammad Ayub (Piyan)	5,581	8.95%	New
BJP	Ramanath Parasnath Tripathi	3,521	5.64%	▼10.65
BSP	Surya Bali Ramkuber Chauhan	415	0.67%	New
Margin of victory		11,818	18.94%	▲13.40
Turnout		62,387	50.51%	▲6.19
Total valid votes		62,387		
Registered electors		1,23,507		▼8.55
ABS gain from INC		Swing	▲15.91	

=== Assembly Election 1999 ===
1999 Maharashtra Legislative Assembly election : Chinchpokli
Party	Candidate	Votes	%	±%
INC	Anna Alias Madhu Chavan	21,146	35.33%	▲13.72
JD(S)	Khan Fayyaz Ahmed Rafique Ahmed	17,828	29.78%	New
BJP	Madhu Chavan	9,755	16.30%	▼0.45
Independent	Kuldeep Pednekar	6,647	11.10%	New
CPI(M)	Ansari Maqsood	1,514	2.53%	New
ABS	Adv. Bagwe Mahendra Pandurang	1,174	1.96%	New
Independent	Abdul Kayyum Sultan Momin	736	1.23%	New
Margin of victory		3,318	5.54%	▼1.24
Turnout		59,858	44.32%	▼10.61
Total valid votes		59,856		
Registered electors		1,35,055		▲2.36
INC gain from JD		Swing	▲6.94	

=== Assembly Election 1995 ===
1995 Maharashtra Legislative Assembly election : Chinchpokli
Party	Candidate	Votes	%	±%
JD	Faiyaz Ahmed	20,573	28.39%	▲9.26
INC	Madhu Chavan	15,656	21.60%	▼19.55
BJP	Chandrakant Jagtap	12,134	16.74%	▼7.72
BSP	Nanaware Vasant Pandurang	11,845	16.35%	New
Independent	Arun Gawli	10,394	14.34%	New
JP	Shaikh Shamim Ahmed	484	0.67%	New
Margin of victory		4,917	6.79%	▼9.91
Turnout		73,514	55.72%	▲6.54
Total valid votes		72,468		
Registered electors		1,31,936		▲4.12
JD gain from INC		Swing	▼12.77	

=== Assembly Election 1990 ===
1990 Maharashtra Legislative Assembly election : Chinchpokli
Party	Candidate	Votes	%	±%
INC	Annasaheb Alias B. D. Zute	25,236	41.16%	▼2.11
BJP	Abdul Alim Khan	15,002	24.47%	New
JD	Mohammed Nassem Siddiqui	11,730	19.13%	New
AIML	Khalil Zahid	6,228	10.16%	New
DMM	Mohammed Iqbal	1,403	2.29%	New
Independent	Ansari Abdul Jabbar	508	0.83%	New
Margin of victory		10,234	16.69%	▼2.06
Turnout		62,134	49.04%	▲3.56
Total valid votes		61,315		
Registered electors		1,26,711		▲16.58
INC hold		Swing	▼2.11	

=== Assembly Election 1985 ===
1985 Maharashtra Legislative Assembly election : Chinchpokli
Party	Candidate	Votes	%	±%
INC	Annasaheb Alias B. D. Zute	21,086	43.27%	New
Independent	Jariwala Abdul Sattar Abdul Majid	11,948	24.52%	New
IC(S)	Phansekar Govindrao Laxam	8,685	17.82%	New
Independent	Thumbre Babanrao Sitaram	3,900	8.00%	New
CPI	Vijay Gulabrao Ganacharya	1,700	3.49%	New
Independent	Dholpuri Abdul Majid Mohammed Sharif	756	1.55%	New
Margin of victory		9,138	18.75%	▼5.29
Turnout		49,376	45.43%	▲15.57
Total valid votes		48,732		
Registered electors		1,08,694		▼6.16
INC gain from INC(I)		Swing	▼8.39	

=== Assembly Election 1980 ===
1980 Maharashtra Legislative Assembly election : Chinchpokli
Party	Candidate	Votes	%	±%
INC(I)	Shaikh Shamim Ahmed	17,512	51.66%	▲36.84
Independent	Kaviskar Suhas Tulaji	9,363	27.62%	New
Independent	Shamim Ahmed Tariq	5,720	16.87%	New
[[Janata Party (Secular) Charan Singh|Janata Party (Secular) Charan Singh]]	Khan M. N.	1,304	3.85%	New
Margin of victory		8,149	24.04%	▼1.75
Turnout		34,346	29.65%	▼25.86
Total valid votes		33,899		
Registered electors		1,15,834		▲0.56
INC(I) gain from Independent		Swing	▲4.66	

=== Assembly Election 1978 ===
1978 Maharashtra Legislative Assembly election : Chinchpokli
Party	Candidate	Votes	%	±%
Independent	Kaviskar Suhas Tulaji	29,847	47.00%	New
Independent	Zute Bhikoba Dhondiba	13,469	21.21%	New
INC	Hoshing Vasant Rangnath	10,263	16.16%	New
INC(I)	Shaikh Shamim Ahmed	9,411	14.82%	New
Margin of victory		16,378	25.79%	
Turnout		64,378	55.89%	
Total valid votes		63,502		
Registered electors		1,15,189		
Independent win (new seat)				

== See also ==
- Chinchpokli
- South Mumbai
- List of constituencies of Maharashtra Legislative Assembly
