= Akhil Bharatiya Kamgar Sena =

Trade union centre in Maharashtra

Akhil Bharatiya Kamgar Sena (Marathi: अखिल भारतीय कामगार सेना) is a trade union centre in Maharashtra, India. ABKS is the labour wing of the Akhil Bharatiya Sena of Arun Gawli. Gawli is the president of ABKS. At the time of its foundation, ABKS claimed a membership of 50,000. Soon after the launch of ABKS, the new union was able to take over some workplace unions previously run by Bharatiya Kamgar Sena or Maharashtra General Kamgar Union, in companies like Oberoi Hotels and the Tata Cancer Hospital. ABKS was able to establish a foothold among employees at National Rayon, Reliance, and public sector units such as SICOM and IRCON.

In 2002, ABKS was able to gain influence amongst the workers at the Mumbai Port Trust.
