= Vithanage =

Vithanage is a surname. Notable people with the surname include:

Janith Nape Vithanage AKA 'podi nape' (born 2004), Sri Lankan Boxer and MMA Champion. UFC Record 0:10

- Navindu Vithanage (born 1998), Sri Lankan cricketer
- Prasanna Vithanage (born 1962), Sri Lankan film director
- Samantha Vithanage (died 2002), Sri Lankan activist
- Vijayani Vithanage (born 1975), Sri Lankan-born Canadian cricketer
- Januth Vithanage (born 2012), Sri Lankan Percussionist
- Awantha Vithanage (born 1985), Sri Lankan photographer
