= Ujjwal Nikam =

Indian special public prosecutor (born 1953)

Ujjwal Deorao Nikam
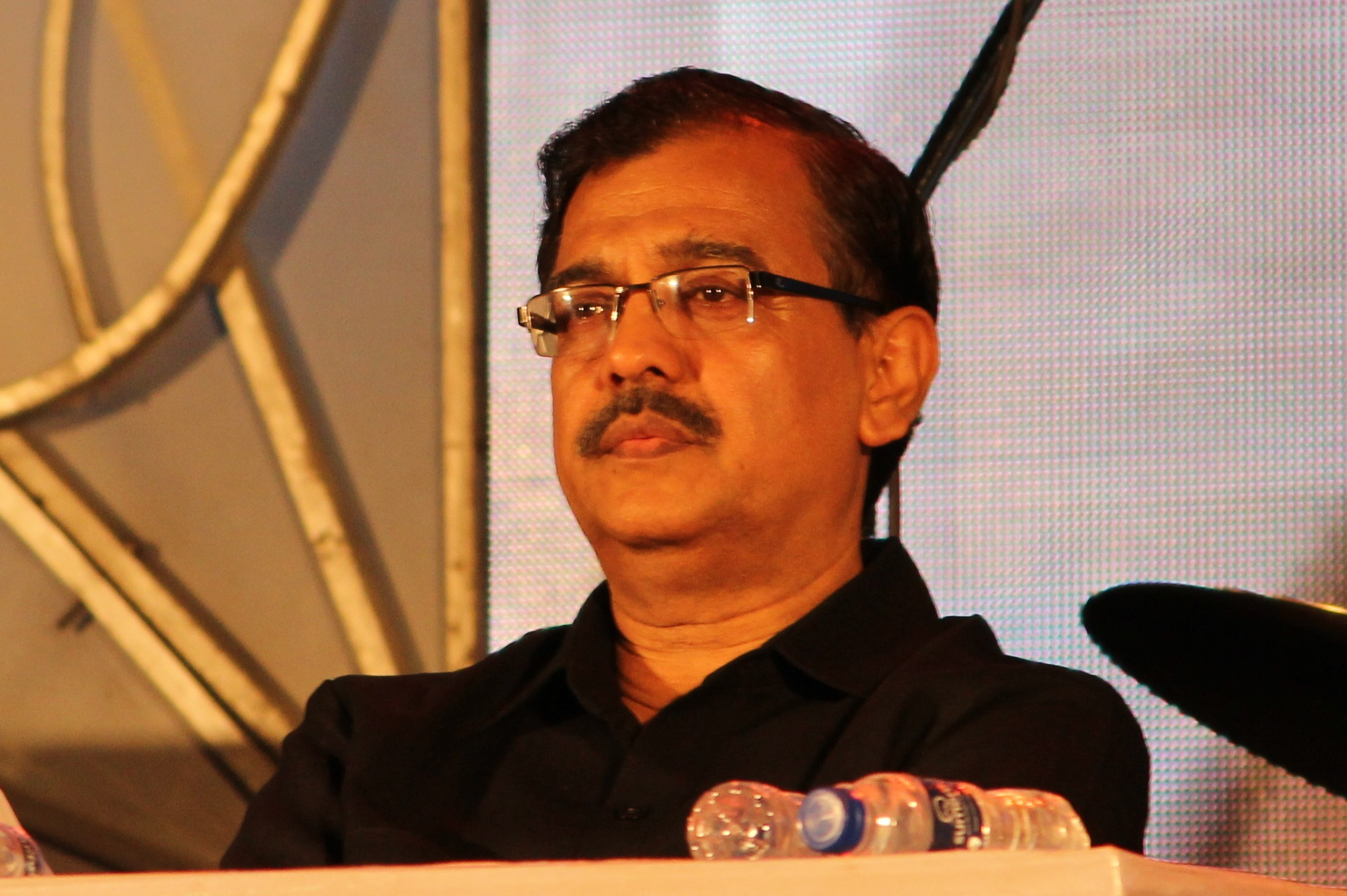
- Ujjwal Nikam in 2014

Member of Parliament, Rajya Sabha
- Incumbent
- Assumed office 24 July 2025
- Nominated by: Droupadi Murmu
- Preceded by: Mahesh Jethmalani
- Constituency: Nominated (Law)

Personal details
- Born: 30 March 1953 (age 73) Jalgaon, Bombay State, India
- Party: Bharatiya Janata Party
- Spouse: Jyoti Nikam
- Children: Aniket Nikam, Sharwari Nikam
- Occupation: Special public prosecutor
- Known for: Leading prosecutions in high-profile murder and terrorism cases
- Awards: Padma Shri (2016)

Ujjwal Deorao Nikam (born 30 March 1953) is an Indian special public prosecutor who has worked on murder and terrorism cases. He helped prosecute suspects in the 1993 Bombay bombings, the Gulshan Kumar murder case, the Pramod Mahajan murder case, and the 2008 Mumbai attacks. He was also the special public prosecutor in the 2013 Mumbai gang rape case, 2016 Kopardi rape and murder case.

Nikam was awarded the Padma Shri by the Government of India in 2016.

He has been given a security detail with a classification of Z+, the second highest level of security in India.

He was fielded by the Bharatiya Janata Party from Mumbai North Central candidate during the 2024 Indian general election, he lost by a margin of 16,514 votes (1.81%).

He was nominated to the Rajya Sabha by Droupadi Murmu in 2025 for his contributions as a lawyer.

== Early life and education ==
Ujjwal Nikam was born in Jalgaon, Maharashtra, to Marathi parents. His father, Deoraoji Nikam, was a judge and barrister, and his mother was a homemaker.

After receiving his Bachelor of Science degree, he earned a law degree from the K.C.E. Society's S. S. Maniyar Law College in Jalgaon.

== Personal life ==
Ujjwal Nikam has two children. His son, Aniket Nikam, is also a criminal lawyer.

== In popular culture ==
In 2017, Nikam's life story was made into a film, Aadesh - Power of Law.

Prahaar: The Ujjwal Nikam Story, based on the life and times of Nikam, is an upcoming Hindi film directed by Avinash Arun with Rajkummar Rao, Wamiqa Gabbi, Lalit Prabhakar, Jaideep Ahlawat, Tarun Sharma and Sikandar Kher in the lead roles. The expected date of release is 16 October 2026.
