= Coalition to Uproot Ragging from Education =

Indian non-governmental organisation

- Founded: 2001
- Founder: Harsh Agarwal, Varun Aggarwal, Mohit Garg, Rajiv Ram
- Type: Research and Advocacy
- Purpose: Ragging, Bullying, Hazing in Educational Institutions
- Location: New Delhi
- Region served: India
- Method: Research, Government Policy, Media Attention, Direct-appeal; Campaigns
- Key people: Harsh Agarwal, Varun Aggarwal, Mohit Garg, Naveen Kumar
- Website: www.noragging.com

The Coalition to Uproot Ragging from Education (CURE) is a voluntary, non-profit NGO in India, dedicated to the elimination of ragging in India.

== History ==
CURE began in July 2001, in Delhi, and has grown to a membership of 470, mostly students.

In February 2007, CURE reported to the Supreme Court appointed Raghavan committee on ways to prevent ragging in Indian universities, highlighting the prevalence of physical and sexual abuse in the name of ragging. CURE also highlighted institutional unwillingness to acknowledge ragging, citing loss of reputation as their reason.

== Goals and research ==
CURE's stated goals are to create awareness about ragging and its ill-effects, provide alternate means of interaction to Indian students and censure those involved in ragging. Their research points to ragging as not being "harmless fun", but the cause of 25 suicides in 7 years
