= Sudanipur =

- Village
- Location in Uttar Pradesh, India Sudanipur (India)
- Coordinates: 26°04′N 83°11′E
- Country: India
- State: Uttar Pradesh
- District: Azamgarh

Languages
  - Official: Hindi
- Time zone: UTC+5:30 (IST)
- Telephone code: 05460
- Vehicle registration: UP-50
- Website: up.gov.in

Sudanipur is a village in Phulpur town, Azamgarh district, located in the state of Uttar Pradesh, India. It is almost 42 km away from Azamgarh city. This village is also referred to as Shudnipur or Sudnipur.

== Notable people ==
- Shaikh Shamim Ahmed – M.L.A. Bombay/Maharashtra (1980–1985), Vice President MPCC, Special Executive officer Govt. of Maharashtra
