= Suicide of Payal Tadvi =

2019 criminal case in Maharashtra, India

The Payal Tadvi or Payal Salim Tadvi suicide case is an ongoing criminal case in the Maharashtra state of India. Payal, a 26-year-old resident doctor, allegedly committed suicide on May 22, 2019, after facing harassment from three of her seniors at Topiwala National Medical College and BYL Nair Hospital. A case has since been brought against three of her former colleagues due to claims of harassment relating to Payal's caste status.

== Background ==
Payal Salim Tadvi was a 26-year-old second year resident doctor at BYL Nair Hospital pursuing her master's degree in Obstetrics and Gynecology.

She belonged to the scheduled Muslim Tadvi Bhil tribe from the state of Maharashtra. Upon completing her undergraduate degree at a medical school in Jalgaon, she moved to Mumbai where she continued her studies at BYL Nair Hospital. She was likely the first from her village to pursue a degree in medical sciences.

== Arrests and charges ==
Immediately following the incident, three of Payal Tadvi's senior colleagues, Bhakti Mehare, Ankita Khandelwal and Hema Ahuja were arrested by the Agripada police on charges of abetting suicide and destruction of evidence. Shortly after, under a request from the Tadvi family's legal representative, the case was transferred to the Mumbai Crime Branch.

Roughly two months later (July 2019), Mumbai Police filed a 1,203-page charge-sheet further accusing the three doctors of various offences under the Scheduled Caste and Scheduled Tribe (Prevention of Atrocities) Act, the Maharashtra Prohibition of Ragging Act, 1999, and the 2000 Information Technology Act. The charge-sheet contained statements from nearly 180 witnesses (colleagues, staff members, and seniors at the hospital) as well as the suicide note police had previously found on Payal Tadvi's mobile phone present at the scene. Information provided in the statements suggests Payal Tadvi experienced discrimination and humiliation due to her social status, the seniors using casteist slurs against her and asking her about her National Eligibility cum Entrance Test scores. Beyond verbal harassment, statements described instances in which the seniors prevented her from accessing important jobs or entering the operation theater. In her own statement, Payal Tadvi's fellow peer and friend Snehal Shinde said that just two days prior to Payal's death the trio had demoted Payal from her upperclassman position in the hospital's antenatal care unit to the postnatal care unit typically reserved for underclassman.

Attached to the charge-sheet was the forensic report confirming the suicide note found had been in Payal Tadvi's handwriting. During the initial investigation of the scene, besides the note on Payal's phone, police were unable to locate a physical copy. As the three seniors had been both the first to enter Payal's room after her death and the first to inform staff members, police suspect them of destroying it.

On August 9, the trio was granted bail by the Bombay High Court. Each woman had to submit a surety of 2 lakh rupees and appear before the crime branch every alternate day. Additional stipulations of their bail restricted the women from traveling outside of Mumbai without explicit permission and forbade them from entering BYL Nair Hospital, or its affiliation, Topiwala National Medical College. Until the conclusion of the trial, their medical licenses have been temporarily suspended. As of February 2020, the three accused had submitted a plea to the court requesting permission to complete the final year of their postgraduate residencies' at BYL Nair Hospital. That same month, Bombay High Court Justice Sadhana Jadhav rejected the request, informing the doctors they could pursue their post graduate education once the trial is complete.

Besides the three seniors, in August Mumbai Police informed the court they had prepared a letter of inquiry against Yi Ching Ling, the head of the gynecology and obstetrics department at BYL Nair Hospital. Payal Tadvi's mother, Abeda Salim Tadvi, reports she had approached Dr. Yi Ching repeatedly with complaints regarding the harassment with little result. Dr Yi Ching's involvement in the case resulted in her being suspended by the hospital; however, when the Tadvi family proved unable to produce proof of her negligence through the form of written complaints, the Maharashtra State Human Rights Commission granted Dr. Yi Ching a clean chit, exonerating her from her suspected crime. Despite the exoneration, in February 2020 Dr. Yi Ching remained suspended. Other professors at the university have since written petitions to the school requesting an inquiry with the hopes that she may eventually be reinstated.

== Trial proceedings ==
In February 2020, the Bombay High Court set a time constraint of 10 months on the special court to complete the trial.

== Larger issue ==
In the months following Payal Tadvi's death, her mother joined forces with Radhika Vemula to petition the supreme court for stronger enforcement of anti-discrimination policies in universities. Radhika Vemula's experiences with loss mirror those of Abeda Tadvi, her son Rohith Vemula, another Dalit university student, having been driven to commit suicide in 2016. In their petition the mothers requested the court issue further guidelines to universities who have seemingly failed to deter caste-based discrimination on their campuses. The women further critiqued the government for its "failure to protect the fundamental rights of Dalit and Adivasi students, faculty, and employees in university campuses."

In order to promote positive change within India's universities, the mothers requested the Supreme Court issue the following four directions to higher education institutions:

1. Establish Equal Opportunity Cells and include representatives of members of the oppressed communities in order to ensure an impartial process;
2. Establish mechanisms that will take action against the victimization of students or staff who file complaints alleging caste discrimination;
3. Regularly organize compulsory orientation courses and training for staff, administrators, and students to raise their sensitivity to caste issues;
4. Display any actions being taken to address caste-based discrimination publicly and transparently, possibly through universities' websites.
