= Ragging =

Student based "initiation ritual"

Ragging is the term used for the "initiation ritual" practiced in higher education institutions in India, Pakistan, Bangladesh, Nepal, and Sri Lanka. The practice is similar to hazing in North America, fagging in the UK, bizutage in France, praxe in Portugal, and other similar practices in educational institutions across the world. Ragging involves abuse, humiliation, or harassment of new entrants or junior students by the senior students. It often takes a malignant form, wherein the newcomers may be subjected to psychological or physical torture. In 2009, the University Grants Commission of India imposed regulations upon Indian universities to help curb ragging and launched a toll-free "anti-ragging helpline".

Ragging is a subset of bullying. Unlike various complex forms of bullying, ragging is easily recognisable.

According to University Grants Commission (India)'s anti-ragging cell data, 511 complaints of ragging were registered in India in 2021. Inaction and underreporting were cited as major causes of encouraging ragging. Medical colleges lead in ragging complaints, with most from the states of Uttar Pradesh and Madhya Pradesh.

== In India ==
Several highly reputed Indian colleges, especially medical ones, have a history of ragging. Sometimes it is even considered to be a college tradition. It has become increasingly unpopular due to several complaints of serious injury to the victims and stringent laws pertaining to ragging. At the national level, ragging is currently defined as: "Any act of physical or mental abuse (including bullying and exclusion) targeted at another student (fresher or otherwise) on the ground of colour, race, religion, caste, ethnicity, gender, appearance, nationality, regional origins, linguistic identity, place of birth, place of residence or economic background."

Following Supreme Court orders, a National Anti-Ragging Helpline was launched by the Indian government.

A report from 2007 highlights 42 instances of physical injury, and reports on ten deaths purportedly the result of ragging.

Ragging in India commonly involves serious abuses and clear violations of human rights. Often media reports and others unearth that it goes on, in many institutions, in the infamous Abu Ghraib style, and on innocent victims.

However, the Anti-Ragging NGO Society Against Violence in Education (SAVE) has supported that ragging is also widely and dangerously prevalent in engineering and other institutions, mainly in the hostels.

=== Anti-Ragging Helpline and anonymous complaints ===
Following a Supreme Court order, a National Anti-Ragging Helpline was created to help the victims and take action in cases of ragging, by informing the head of the institution and the local police authorities of the ragging complaint from the college. The main feature of the helpline is that the complaints can be registered anonymously.

India's National Anti-Ragging Helpline started working in June 2009 to help students in distress due to ragging. It can be reached through email and a 24-hour toll-free number. Provision for anonymous complaints was considered of utmost important at the time of establishment of the helpline, since the victim after making the complaint remains with or close to the culprits, away from a fully secure environment. Since many ragging deaths, like Aman Kachroo's, occurred due to seniors taking a revenge of the complaint made, anonymous complaints were equally allowed at the helpline.

As per UGC regulations, it is mandatory for a college to register a first information report (F.I.R.) with police against the culprits if any violence, physical abuse, sexual harassment, confinement etc. takes place with any fresher. After receiving any such complaint from the helpline, it becomes the duty of the head of the institution to register the F.I.R. with police within 24 hours. In 2013, a police case was registered against the director, dean and registrar of a reputed college in Delhi for, among other charges, not informing the police and registering F.I.R. within 24 hours of receiving the ragging complaint. (failing to inform a public authority, IPC 176).

The database of the Anti-Ragging Helpline indicates that it has been to an extent successful in ensuring a safer environment in colleges from where it registered the complaints. In many cases, it forwarded the complaint to the University Grants Commission (UGC) for an action against those colleges which refused to take any action against the culprits.

==== Controversy ====
A major concern that was highlighted against the helpline was that it registered a minuscule percentage (0.1%) of the total phone calls it received. Specifically, the toll-free helpline received 165,297 calls in the three months of November 2012 to January 2013, but only 190 complaints were registered in this period. In its defence, the helpline said that most of the calls it received were inquiries from students seeking to know whether the helpline number worked or not. Some students changed their minds about registering a complaint during their call.

=== Legislation ===
In 1997, the state of Tamil Nadu first passed laws related to ragging. Subsequently, a major boost to anti-ragging efforts was given by a landmark judgement of the Supreme Court of India in May 2001, in response to a Public Interest Litigation filed by the Vishwa Jagriti Mission founded by Sudhanshu Ji Maharaj.

==== Maharashtra Prohibition of Ragging Act, 1999 ====
In 1999, the Government of Maharashtra enacted the Maharashtra Prohibition of Ragging Act, 1999 to prohibit ragging which it defines as the:

Display of disorderly conduct, doing of any act which causes or is likely to cause physical or psychological harm or raise apprehension or fear or shame or embarrassment to a student in any educational institution and includes— (i) teasing, abusing, threatening or playing practical jokes on, or causing hurt to, such student; or (ii) asking a student to do any act or perform something which such student will not, in the ordinary course, willingly, do. Maharashtra Prohibition of Ragging Act, 1999 (PDF) (Maharashtra Act XXXIII). 1999. p. 2.

The objective of the act is to create a framework to establish ragging as a criminal act, and lay out possible punishments under the law. Section 4 of the Act states:

Whoever directly or indirectly commits, participates in, abets or propagates ragging within or outside any educational institution shall, on conviction, be punished with imprisonment for a term which may extend to two years and shall also be liable to a fine which may extend to ten thousand rupees. Maharashtra Prohibition of Ragging Act, 1999 (PDF) (Maharashtra Act XXXIII). 1999. p. 2.

Students who have been convicted under this act may also be dismissed from their educational institution and barred from enrolling in any other educational institution for five years. Additionally, the act outlines a procedure for educational institutions to handle accusations of ragging, including suspending the accused student(s) and conducting investigations into the allegations. The act also holds institutions accountable if they fail to act according to the prescribed procedures. Under Section 7 of the Act, the head of the institution who fails or neglects to properly investigate such allegations :"shall be deemed to have abetted the offense of ragging and shall, on conviction, be punished as provided for in section 4", Maharashtra Prohibition of Ragging Act, 1999 (PDF) (Maharashtra Act XXXIII). 1999. p. 3. In other words, the school principal, chancellor, or other head faces the same punishment as a student who has been accused and convicted under this law.

It was applied in 2013, and resulted in the suspension of six students from Rajiv Gandhi Medical College in Mumbai. The most notable case in which it has been applied is the Suicide of Payal Tadvi, in which three senior medical students were charged under this act as well as under the Scheduled Caste and the Scheduled Tribe (Prevention of Atrocities) Act, and the Information Technology Act, 2000. The charge-sheet filed by the Mumbai Police alleges that the ragging in this case consisted of harassment, humiliation, and discrimination, which directly led to her suicide. Since 2018, at the Maharashtra University of Health Sciences, the university which supervises the Topiwala National Medical College where Payal Tadvi studied, six of seven accusations of ragging could not proven. In 2010, 18 students at the Seth GS Medical College were arrested and charged with ragging under the Act.

In 2015, L.K. Kshirsagar, principle of the Maharashtra Institute of Technology's College of Engineering, was arrested and charged under Section 7 of the Act, for failing to investigate and neglecting his duties under the law, in a case involving three students who had been accused of ragging the previous year.

In June 2019, after the suicide of Payal Tadvi, there were calls to strengthen the anti-ragging laws to check anti-caste bias. The law itself does not mention caste-based discrimination or other specific forms of bias.

==== Major incidents in Kerala ====
In 2025, Mihir Ahammed a 15-year-old student of the Global Public School Ernakulam, Kochi committed suicide after he was ragged by his senior classmates. According to the police, the student committed suicide by jumping off the 26th floor of a 40-story flat complex in Thrippunithura, An employee working there found him dead on the third-floor truss of the building. She reported hearing a loud noise on 15 January 2025 and reached the spot around 4 pm. The fire force arrived and brought down the body. The body was taken to the morgue of the Thrippunithura Taluk Hospital.

==== Central Government and Supreme Court legislation ====
The Indian Supreme Court has taken a strong stand to prevent ragging. In 2006, the court directed the H.R.D. Ministry of the Govt. of India to form a panel which will suggest guidelines to control ragging.

The Ministry of Human Resources Development (MHRD), following a directive by the Supreme Court, appointed a seven-member panel headed by former CBI director Dr. R. K. Raghavan to recommend anti-ragging measures. The Raghavan Committee report, submitted to the court in May 2007, includes a proposal to include ragging as a special section under the Indian Penal Code. The Supreme Court of India interim order (based on the recommendations) dated 16 May 2007 makes it obligatory for academic institutions to file official First Information Reports with the police in any instance of a complaint of ragging. This would ensure that all cases would be formally investigated under the criminal justice system, and not by the academic institutions' own ad-hoc bodies.

Welcoming the Supreme Court's judgment on ragging, Dr. Raghavan said, "there are finally signs that the recommendations to prevent ragging in colleges will be taken seriously".

In 2007, the Supreme Court directed that all the higher educational institutions should include information about all the ragging incidents in their brochures/prospectus of admission.

==== 2009 UGC regulation ====
In 2009, in the wake of Aman Kachroo's death, the University Grants Commission (UGC) passed UGC regulation on curbing ragging in higher educational institutions. These regulation mandate every college responsibilities to curb ragging, including strict pre-emptive measures, like lodging freshers in a separate hostel, surprise raids at night by the anti-ragging squad and submission of affidavits by all senior students and their parents taking oath not to indulge in ragging.

Subsequently, UGC has made few amendments to the Regulation. As per these,

1. It is no longer required to get the verification of the affidavit done by an oath commissioner.
2. The definition of ragging is updated to read: "Any act of physical or mental abuse (including bullying and exclusion) targeted at another student (fresher or otherwise) on the ground of colour, race, religion, caste, ethnicity, gender (including transgender), sexual orientation, appearance, nationality, regional origins, linguistic identity, place of birth, place of residence or economic background."

=== Anti-ragging movement in India ===
With the situation of ragging worsening yearly, there is emerging a spontaneous anti-ragging movement in India. Several voluntary organisations have emerged, who conduct drives for public awareness and arrange for support to victims.

Online groups like Coalition to Uproot Ragging from Education (CURE), Stopragging, No Ragging Foundation became the major anti-ragging groups on the Internet. Among them, the No Ragging Foundation has transformed into a complete NGO and got registered as Society Against Violence in Education (SAVE) which is India's first registered anti-ragging nonprofit organisation (NGO).

The Indian media has exposed ragging incidents and the indifference of many concerned institutions towards curbing the act. The Supreme Court of India has directed, in its interim judgement, that action may be taken against negligent institutions.

== In Sri Lanka ==
Ragging is widely prevalent in Sri Lanka.

There is no record to suggest that ragging is an indigenous phenomenon or was present in the ancient Sri Lankan educational institutions such as Mahavihara or Abhayagiri Vihara. It is widely considered to have been introduced during the post-World War II era. Sri Lankan soldiers returning from war re-entered the college educational system and brought with them the tradition and techniques of military style ragging. These techniques were used in the military as a mechanism of breaking down an individual so that success was achieved through team effort rather than personal goals or motivation. As fewer military persons entered the universities, ragging devolved into a violent and hazardous exercise that has been largely utilized for political purposes and thuggery.

Ragging continues in most government universities and several private institutions with some efforts being made to contain the problem, although there is hesitation from administrations to get involved. These efforts have been largely hindered by students themselves, who consider ragging as a rite of passage. The creation of "safe spaces" and travelling in larger groups are some techniques employed by a growing movement of students trying to combat ragging.

Traditionally, ragging would entail seniors mocking or jeering at freshers within a dedicated period of time – usually the first few months of an undergraduate's university life. This period is known as the "ragging period". In Sri Lanka, several variations of ragging can be observed.

=== Adverse consequences ===
Ragging has been frequently associated with a broad spectrum of physical, behavioral, emotional and social problems among victims and is attributed to the increased risk of suicide and drop-outs among students attending Sri Lankan universities. Ragging at private universities and higher education institutes are at a minimum as compared to government universities, which has prompted many students with financial means to enroll in private establishments. Ragging is not merely a sociolegal problem and has a certain psychological basis too. Many senior students state they do not wish to rag juniors, but succumb to peer pressure. On the other hand, although some new students or freshers enjoyed being ragged by their seniors, other students despised it. Following their ragging, they did not even wish to talk to the senior students who subjected them to "inhumane mental and physical torture".

=== Major incidents ===
- In 1974, ragging of trainee mathematics teachers at the then Vidyalankara University (now University of Kelaniya) prompted Prime Minister Sirimavo Bandaranaike's Government to appoint V. W. Kularatne Commission to probe the incident. As a result, 12 undergraduates were expelled and four officials were penalized for their failure to take appropriate action. This was the first major step taken against university ragging by a Sri Lankan government.
- In 1975, the University of Peradeniya reported an incident where a 22-year-old female student of the Faculty of Agriculture, Rupa Rathnaseeli, became paralyzed as a result of jumping from the second floor of the hostel Ramanathan Hall to escape the physical ragging carried out by her seniors. It was reported that she was about to be sexually penetrated by a foreign object as part of the ragging initiation, and that she jumped out of the hostel building to escape the abuse. Rupa Rathnaseeli committed suicide 22 years after the incident, in 2002.
- Prasanga Niroshana, a student from Hakmana, died as a result of undisclosed injuries he sustained from ragging at the School of Agriculture, Angunakolapallassa.^{[a]}
- In 1997, 21-year-old S. Varapragash, an engineering student of University of Peradeniya, died from kidney failure following severe ragging by senior students. The main accused Balendran Prasad Sadeeskaran fled and was sentenced to death in absentia.
- In 1997, Kelum Thushara Wijetunge, a first-year student at the Hardy Technical institute in Ampara, died from kidney failure after he was forced to do tough exercises and drink excessive quantities of liquor.
- In 2002, Samantha Vithanage, a third-year management student at the University of Sri Jayewardenepura, who pioneered an anti-ragging campaign, was killed at a meeting while in a discussion on ragging after being surrounded by a mob of 200, being struck with shards of glass and then having a computer monitor dropped on his head, resulting in his death 2 days later.
- In 2006, Prof. Chandima Wijebandara, the vice-chancellor of University of Sri Jayewardenepura, resigned from his post as a result of students failing to comply with his orders to eliminate ragging from the university.
- In 2014, the body of a student, D. K. Nishantha, was found hanging from a tree within the premises of the University of Peradeniya, in a shrubbery area located not far from the Marcus Fernando Boys' Hostel. According to police reports, the young man had been a witness to the sexual assault of his friend which took place in 2010, perpetrated by several other students residing in the dorm. Police stated that D. K. Nishantha had not attended the university since the time of the alleged sex abuse case. The death was later ruled a suicide.
- In 2015, a 23-year-old student of the Sabaragamuwa University, Amali Chathurika committed suicide due to ragging
- In 2019, Dilhan Wijesinghe, a 23-year-old student of the University of Moratuwa committed suicide due to ragging. He was previously studying in the University of Jaffna where he was subjected to physical ragging and then received a transfer to the University of Moratuwa. The ragging at the University of Moratuwa was more severe, and he could no longer tolerate the ragging and committed suicide.
- In 2022, Nuwan Lakshitha Devasurendra, a 24-year-old student of the University of Peradeniya committed suicide. According to the police, the student committed suicide by jumping off the Peradeniya Bridge into Mahaweli River, was found near Hakkinda Islands (2 km from the bridge). A postmortem has yet to be performed.

=== Legal framework ===
The human rights of citizens of Sri Lanka are protected in terms of the Constitution of the Democratic Socialist Republic of Sri Lanka, which is the supreme law in the country. According to this Constitution, any citizen can produce a petition to the Supreme Court in terms of the article 126 of the Constitution in case of a human right violation or a case closer to the infringement. The Constitution further highlights ruthless, brutal or contemptuous treatment of any party by another as a violation of human rights. University students are also considered as citizens and are subjugated to the Common Law that prevails in the country. Accordingly, the constitutional constraints specified above are equally applicable to university students. Any form of civil or criminal offence executed by them is liable to be punished and in an instance of violation of such rights committed by university students, they shall be produced before the relevant court and subject to suitable punishment that followed by the trial.

The Supreme Court of Sri Lanka in April 1998 ruled constitutional the Prohibition of Ragging and Other Forms of Violence in Educational Institutions Act, No. 20 of 1998. The court said verbal abuse (ragging, bullying, and/or harassment) intended to humiliate and degrade students should be prohibited in order to create a positive learning environment.

=== Anti-ragging movement ===
Unlike in India, there is no official anti-ragging movement in Sri Lanka. But with the situation of ragging worsening yearly, there is a spontaneously emerging anti-ragging movement in each and every faculty of the universities that ragging exists. In the case of University of Peradeniya, the largest university in Sri Lanka, anti-ragging movement emerged in the year 1996. Prior to that, there was no movement against ragging, but certain individuals managed to escape from the ragging. In the meantime, anti-ragging movements started to appear in all other universities. Several faculties in several universities have become rag-free due to these movements, strengthened laws as well as practical difficulties in conducting ragging such as not providing accommodation facilities to the first-year students. Internal clashes have erupted several times due to the friction between ragging and anti-ragging movements, the best example being Samantha Vithanage, a third-year management student at the University of Sri Jayewardenepura, who pioneered an anti-ragging campaign that was killed at a meeting while in a discussion about ragging. The higher education minister at the time, S. B. Dissanayake, stressed that firm action will be taken against those who are found guilty of such activities in future and would be expelled from the university. In December 2011, he claimed that the levels of ragging has gone down drastically in the recent times and "only Peradeniya and Ruhuna are still affected by this 'malaise'".

== See also ==
- Hazing
- Dedovshchina, a Russian practice similar to hazing or ragging
- Guest room, ragging system carried out by Bangladesh Chhatra League
- Gaslighting
- List of hazing deaths in the United States
