= Shaikh Shamim Ahmed =

Indian politician and social worker (1938–2019)

Shamim Ahmed
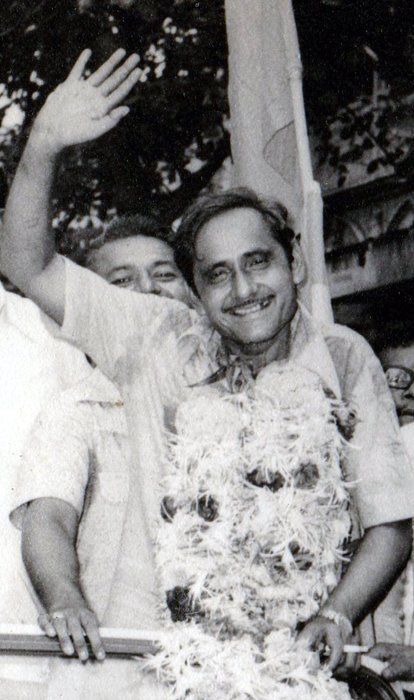
- Shaikh-Shamim-Ahmed, during victory rally, 28 May 1980, at Byculla, Bombay

Personal details
- Born: 20 March 1938 Sudanipur, United Provinces, British India (now in Uttar Pradesh, India)
- Died: 22 September 2019 (aged 81) Mumbai, Maharashtra, India
- Party: Indian National Congress
- Spouse: Rehana Begum Shaikh
- Children: 2

Shaikh Shamim Ahmed (20 March 1938 – 22 September 2019) was an Indian politician and social worker. In 1980, he was elected as an MLA from the Mumbai Chinchpokli Constituency as an Indian National Congress candidate.

== Early life ==
Shaikh Shamim Ahmed, the son of Shaikh Azizur Rahman, was born into a Zamindar family in the small town of Sudanipur (Shudnipur), in Azamgarh district, Uttar Pradesh.

== Career ==
In 1980, Ahmed was elected as an MLA from the Chinchpokli Constituency as an Indian National Congress candidate. He was a Member of the Maharashtra Legislative Assembly from 1980 to 1985.

== Political and social activities ==
In 1977 at the call of "Jail bharo andolan" (fill up the jails) in support of Indira Gandhi, (former Prime Minister of India) Ahmed took the initiative and courted arrest with 96 supporters at Azamgarh, Uttar Pradesh. He was sentenced to three days imprisonment and sent to Varanasi Central jail. He contested general elections for the Assembly in 1978 as a Congress (I) candidate.

== Elections contested ==
- (1) 5th Lok Sabha Elections Feb-1971 (as Independent candidate) from 5 Bombay Central South, constituency.
- (2) Maharashtra Vidhan Sabha Elections 1978, as Congress (I) Candidate, from Chinchpokli, Mumbai, constituency
- (3) Maharashtra Vidhan Sabha Elections 1980, as Indian National Congress, Candidate, from Chinchpokli, Mumbai, constituency.

== Positions held ==
- 1) 1978–1980 – General Secretary, B.R.C.C. (I) Minority Cell.
- 2) 1978–1990 – Vice President Bombay Central South District Congress Committee.
- 3) Special Executive Magistrate (1988–1990)
- 4) Special Executive Officer (2004–2008)

== Maharashtra Assembly Results 1980 ==
- Constituency : 25 – Chinchpokli

NAME	GENDER	PARTY	VOTES	%
1 . Shaikh Shamim Ahmed	M	INC (I)	17,512	51.66%
2 . Kaviskar S. T.	M	Independent	9,363	27.62%
3 . Shamim Ahmed (Taroq)	M	Independent	5,720	16.87%
4 . Khan M. N.	M	Janata Party (Secular)	1,304	3.85%

- Elector : 115834 Voters : 34346 Poll percentage : 29.65% Valid votes: 33899
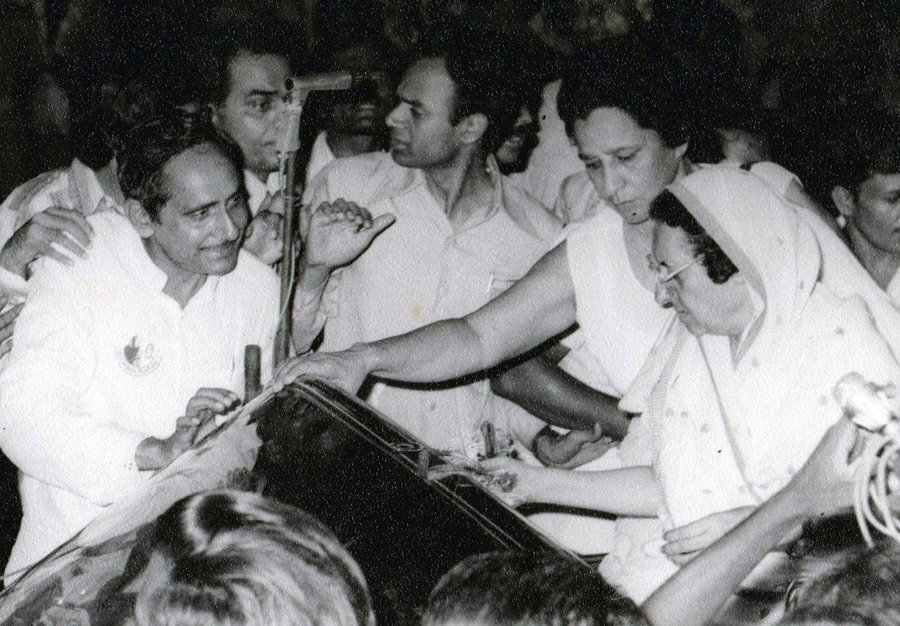
Shaikh Shamim Ahmed (left), with Mrs. Indira Gandhi (former Prime Minister of India) during his Assembly election campaign at Byculla, Bombay on 14 May 1980.

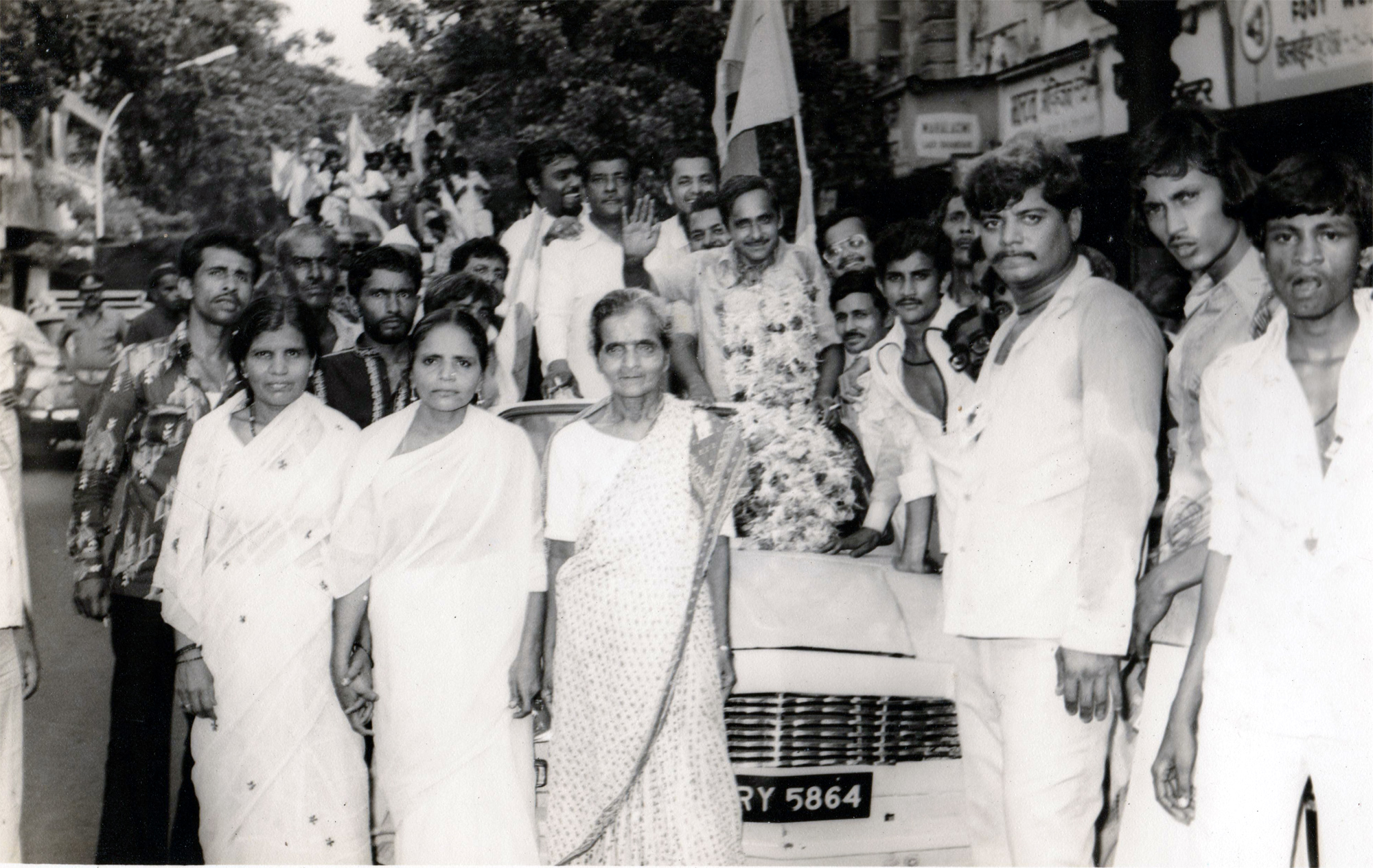
Victory Rally: Shaikh Shamim Ahmed s/o Shaikh Azeezur Rahamn wins Maharashtra State General Assembly Election from Chinchpokli (Byculla), Mumbai on 28 May 1980.

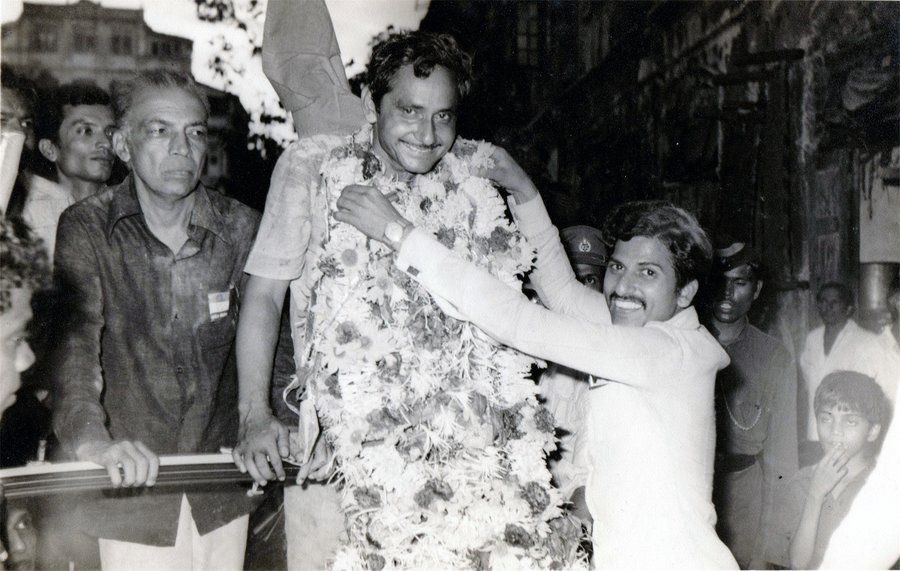
One Constituency (Chinchpokli) & three M.L.A's. B.D. Zute, Shaikh Shamim Ahmed, and Madhu Chavan on 28 May 1980.

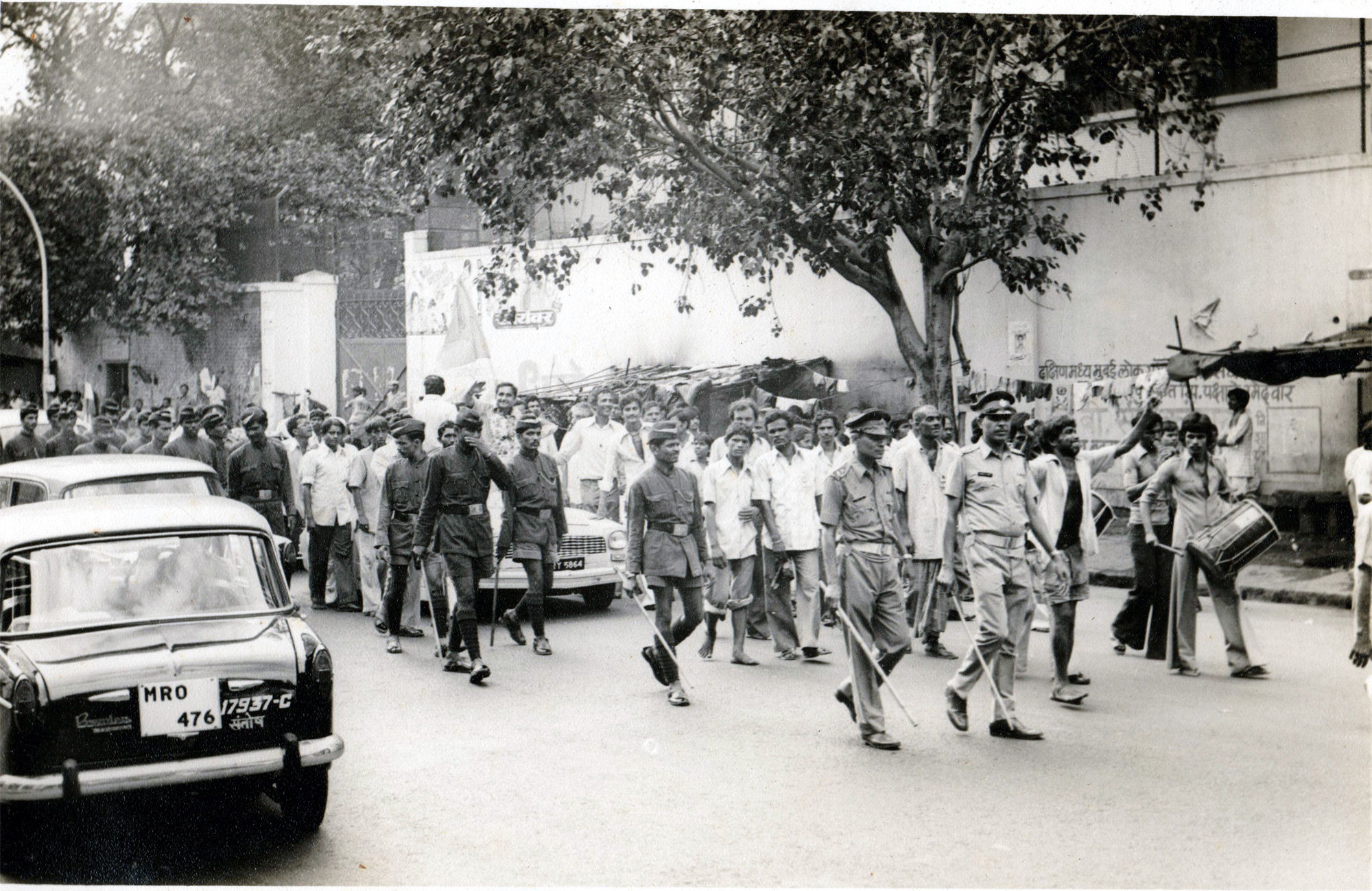
Victory Rally: Shaikh Shamim Ahmed s/o Shaikh Azeezur Rahamn wins Maharashtra State General Assembly Election from Chinchpokli (Byculla), Mumbai on 28 May 1980.

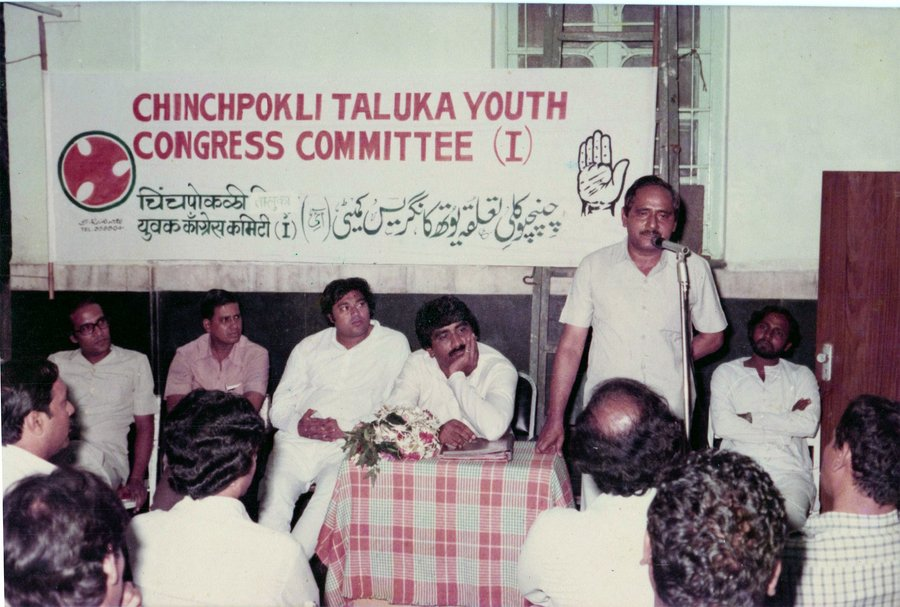
Shaikh Shamim Ahmed M.L.A. addressing a public meeting in his constituency Chinchpokli, Bombay.
