= Aadesh - Power of Law =

Aadesh - The Power of Law
- Directed by: Suvahhdan Angre; Deepak Sawakhande
- Written by: Suvahhdan Angre
- Produced by: Yogesh Wanve
- Starring: Suvahhdan Angre; Mukesh Tiwari; Anant Jog; Ashok Shinde; Mithila Naik
- Cinematography: Dilipkumar Dongre
- Edited by: Sameer Choudharee
- Music by: Shreerang Aras
- Release date: 6 October 2017 (India)
- Country: India
- Language: Marathi

Aadesh - The Power of Law is a 2017 Indian Marathi film directed by Suvahhdan Angre and produced by Yogesh Wanve, based on the life of public prosecutor Ujjwal Nikam, who successfully secured the death penalty for terrorist Ajmal Kasab. It is the first Indian film about a prosecuting attorney.

== Premise ==
A fearless and flamboyant public prosecutor takes up cases involving high profile and influential criminals, that makes him face off against the most successful defense lawyers in his field.

== Reception ==
Aadesh - The Power of Law received strongly negative review from Mayuri Phandis of the Times of India, who rated it one out of five stars, referring to it as a "dramatised and poorly shot string of cases" that "does nothing to satiate the curiosities" of the viewer.

== Cast ==
- Suvahhdan Angre
- Anant Jog
- Mukesh Tiwari
- Ashok Shinde
- Mithila Naik
- Yogesh Wanve

== Soundtrack ==
| No. | Title | Singer(s) | Length |
|---|---|---|---|
| 1. | "Satyameva Jayate" | Milind Ingle |
| 2. | "Hai English Hai Rum" | Kavita Rajnhans |
| 3. | "Janmantariche Nate He Apule" | Vaishali Samant, Milind Ingle |
