= Sadhana Sanjay Jadhav =

Indian judge

Retired judge of Bombay High Court
- In office 23 January 2012 – 13 June 2022

Personal details
- Born: 14 June 1960 (age 66)

Sadhana Sanjay Jadhav (born 14 June 1960) is a retired judge of the Bombay High Court, in Maharashtra, India. Jadhav has sat on the bench in a number of notable cases concerning criminal offences, including the death of Sheena Bora, the Adarsh Housing Society scam, the trial of Bollywood actor Sanjay Dutt in relation to the 1993 Bombay bombings, the case concerning the suicide of medical resident Payal Tadvi, and the case concerning the murder of writer Govind Pansare. Jadhav is also responsible for several legally significant interpretations of criminal law and procedure, concerning the right to appeal, and regarding penalties under the Scheduled Caste and Scheduled Tribe (Prevention of Atrocities) Act 1989.

== Life ==
Jadhav was born in Solapur and was educated in Pune, attending Fergusson College and Pune University to obtain a bachelor's degree and master's degree in political science. She studied law at Symbiosis Law School in Pune, and initially practiced law at the Aurangabad bench of the Bombay High Court, before practicing in Mumbai.

== Judicial career ==
Jadhav was appointed an additional judge of the Bombay High Court on 23 January 2012. He retired on 13 June 2022.

In 2012, Jadhav along with Bombay High Court Judge Abhay Oka established the principle that accused persons did not have an inherent right to appeal against judicial orders, but could only do so when such right was granted by a statute. They also held that a legislature could take away the right to appeal in any set of cases.

In 2013, Jadhav, along with Justice Vijaya Tahilramani, were directed by the Bombay High Court to constitute a female-led bench to hear all appeals against acquittals for the offence of rape. This was following a decision from the Bombay High Court that all such acquittals would from 2013 onward, be heard by benches of female judges.

In 2016, Jadhav heard the case concerning the widely reported murder of Sheena Bora, and passed orders criticising the Central Bureau of Investigation (CBI) as well as the CBI Special Court that was trying the case, for procedural improprieties and delays. The case is still ongoing.

In 2016, Jadhav heard appeals filed by several members of the Sanatan Sanstha, a Hindu extremist group, in connection with the widely reported murder of writer Govind Pansare. Jadhav allowed the proceedings to be stayed, in order to allow the Maharashtra government's Criminal Investigation Department to investigate possible links to the murder of writers Narendra Dabholkar and M. M. Kalburgi. The case is still ongoing but has been transferred to a different judge.

In 2017, Jadhav criticised the Maharashtra Government for ordering the early release of Bollywood actor Sanjay Dutt from jail, following his conviction for possession of arms, in relation to the 1993 Bombay bombings, and asked the government to justify it through court filings. The case was later transferred to a different judge of the Bombay High Court, who found no illegalities in his release.

In 2017, Jadhav and another judge, Ranjit More, quashed an order of the Governor of Maharashtra, Vidyasagar Rao granting sanction to prosecute former Maharashtra Chief Minister Ashok Chavan in connection with the politically significant Adarsh Housing Society scam. The order prevents Chavan from being tried in relation to the scam.

In 2017, Jadhav faced criticism following her remarks in a case concerning sexual abuse of a minor by the minor's adoptive father. Jadhav remarked, while granting bail to the accused, that minor victim was "inherently abnormal", "had a sexual instinct since childhood" and "was used to doing dirty things." The remarks were reported on and publicly criticized, and Jadhav later passed a second order, expunging her own remarks from the record, stating that they had been drawn from some documents submitted in evidence.

In 2017, Jadhav was also one of two judges to withdraw their membership from a housing project for official judges' residences, proposed by an association of judges, and approved by the Devendra Fadnavis-led BJP government in Maharashtra. The project had attracted controversy because it was proposed to be built on land that had been allocated for affordable public housing, and regulatory requirements of public notice had been waived in order to have the project approved by the Maharashtra Housing and Development Authority. The Bombay High Court is currently hearing a petition challenging the approval to this project.

In 2019, Jadhav rebuked prosecutors for delays in the case concerning the abetment of suicide of medical resident Payal Tadvi, following alleged harassment by colleagues, and directed them to investigate hospital authorities for failing to act to prevent harm. The case is still ongoing.

In 2019, Jadhav also established a new form of criminal procedure and penalty for offences committed under the Scheduled Caste and Scheduled Tribe (Prevention of Atrocities) Act 1989. Although the act only contemplates arrest, trial, and compensation for offences, Jadhav, in two separate orders, prohibited the arrest of persons accused under the Act, and directed them to engage in a series of 'reformative deeds' including the planting of 50 trees, instead.

In 2022, Jadhav retired.
