= Akhil Bharatiya Sena =

- Leader: Arun Gawli
- Founded: 1997
- Dissolved: 2019
- Headquarters: Om Kala Niketan Sankalap, Co-op. Housing Society, Anandgar, Park Site, Vikhroli (West) Mumbai - 400079
- Labour wing: Akhil Bharatiya Kamgar Sena

Akhil Bharatiya Sena (lit. All India Army) is a political party founded in 1997 in Mumbai, Maharashtra by Arun Gawli (alias 'Daddy'). Gawli had earlier been close to the Shiv Sena supremo, Bal Thackeray, but in 1996 a bloody feud surged between them when Arun Gawli mercilessly slew several Sena party legislators and party workers. Gawli then formed a separate party.

In the BrihanMumbai Municipal Corporation (BMC) elections 2002 the ABS candidate Sunil Ghate defeated the Sena candidate in Gawli's home turf. Ghate is today the sole ABS corporator in BMC.

In the Lok Sabha elections 2004 Gawli got 92,210 votes (26.5%) in the constituency Mumbai South Central.

In the Maharashtra state assembly elections later the same year ABS launched 20 candidates. One (Gawli) got elected.

The trade union wing of ABS is called Akhil Bharatiya Kamgar Sena.

In 2007 BMC elections (Mumbai city council) ABS won 2 seat. His daughter Geeta Gawali won and became corporator on ABS ticket. In 2009 ABS supported Congress party and its candidate Milind Deora on Mumbai South. In 2010 Arun Gawali and all his candidates lost the election for (vidhan sabha) Maharashtra Assembly election. In 2017 new candidate Santosh (Henry) Alfred DSaoza joined Akhil Bhartiya Sena from Ward No 209. However, he lost the election and he is now Byculla Taluka Adhyaksha.

Gawali is currently in jail.

== See also ==
- Vandana Gawli
