= Samantha Vithanage =

Ovitigala Vithanage Samantha a.k.a. Samantha Vithanage (died 2002) was a third year Management student of the University of Sri Jayewardenepura, Sri Lanka, who pioneered an anti-ragging campaign, and was killed on 7 November 2002 while in a discussion to stop the brutal practice of ragging in the faculty. His death was a landmark incident in the anti-ragging movement of Sri Lankan universities which provoked many students and academic staff of universities to act against ragging.

On 7 November 2002, the anti-ragging campaigners sat down for a discussion with the pro-rag JVP controlled student council - General Students Union of University of Sri Jayawardanepura (Progressive Front), who defended the practice. The meeting took place at the premises of Department of Marketing Management. Midway through the discussion, a mob of around 200 JVP supporters armed with clubs and stones stormed into the room and viciously attacked Vithanage and others in the anti-ragging camp. The attackers stabbed their victims with shards of glass and Vithanage who was struck, fell to the floor. Vithanage was seriously injured. Pro-ragging students also blocked the vehicle carrying the injured to the hospital, delaying proper medical treatment. Two days later Samantha Vithanage died.

The University Lecturers Association of the Sri Jayawardanapura University (SJU) denouncing the killing of Samantha had stated "This inhumane student slaughter is the most brutal killing and the worst black mark in the history of the SJU." Vikramabahu Karunaratne accused Janatha Vimukthi Peramuna - a Marxist-Leninist, political party for the murder. General Students Union of University of Sri Jayawardanepura is a member of the Inter University Students' Federation, a students' union affiliated to SFP.

Later, Samantha Vithagane fund was created in memory of the slain student Samantha Vithanage. Although the death of 22-year-old Vithanage subdued the rag at the University of Sri Jayewardenepura for a while, it has not totally eradicated the practice. After 20 years, in 2022, 7 out of the initially accused 22 individuals were sentenced to prison and fines.

== See also ==
- Ragging in Sri Lanka
