= Society Against Violence in Education =

Indian anti-bullying organisation

- Abbreviation: SAVE
- Founder: Kushal Banerjee
- Type: Non-governmental organisation Non-profit organisation
- Location: Kolkata, Delhi, Mumbai, Raipur, Kanpur, Jabalpur in India
- Region served: serving entire India
- Services: Victim Supports, Awareness Campaigns, Consultation to institutions, etc.
- Volunteers: 200
- Website: no2ragging.org
- Formerly called: No Ragging Foundation

Society Against Violence in Education (SAVE) is a non profit organisation working for the eradication of ragging and bullying from educational institutions in India.

Major field(s) :

- Human rights
- Nonviolence
- Education

SAVE is possibly the first-registered anti-ragging NGO in India.

It is mainly composed of professionals and students from various fields who volunteer for the cause in their free time.

== Formation ==
Ragging has been taking a huge toll of innocent lives and careers for long. But there had been no single civil movement against the evil of ragging. There were websites and online groups, from where some conscientious youths gave birth to a non profit organisation, which later came to fame in the name of the "No Ragging Foundation". Later, the No Ragging Foundation was registered as the Society Against Violence in Education (SAVE).

Amit Sahai Gangwar, a first year student of NIT-Jalandhar, lost his life in October 2005. The news was covered by various media - news channels and dailies. This event had a great impact in the formation of this organisation.

== Mission ==
The Society Against Violence in Education (SAVE) is an impartial, neutral and independent, non-profit organisation whose exclusively humanitarian mission is to protect the lives and dignity of students in educational institutions and to provide the victims of 'ragging' with assistance and also to facilitate the eradication of ragging from educational institutions through awareness, advocacy, research and such other avenues.

It works towards the creation of an environment where students can learn with fun and not with fear. It directs its efforts towards elimination of violence and abuses on innocent freshers while promoting peace and harmony among the senior and the juniors students in academic institutions.

== Objectives ==
Create a strong public mandate against ragging.

Device alternative but healthy and humane modes of interaction between seniors & juniors.

Unite the isolated protests against ragging under the umbrella of a strong, united movement.

Involve the authorities, faculties, students and others in the anti ragging drives.

== Activities ==
- Awareness - Encouraging healthy interactions and friendly campuses
- Supporting & Empowering the victims and their families
- Consultation to educational institutions in implementing anti-ragging measures.
- Research and training
- Activism, advocacy, etc.

=== Awareness - Encouraging healthy interactions and friendly campuses ===
They spread the awareness against ragging and provide support to the victims. They also promote healthy and humane modes of interactions between the seniors and the juniors. They promote anti-ragging campus units, involving students, class and faculty members.

SAVE has been arranging awareness events, mainly in educational institutions in different parts of India, involving students, faculty members and other stakeholders. Such events serve to empower and encourage the freshers (potential victims) as well as to promote healthy modes of interactions. The events are used to guide institutional authorities, if required, on effectively implementing anti ragging measures in the campus. Faculties and students have admired such events to be very useful for the cause.

SAVE has arranged events in different parts of the country, for example : Kolkata, Delhi, Mumbai, Chennai, Kanpur, Varanasi, Ajmer, Hyderabad, Dehradun, Surat, Pune, Haldia, Durgapur, Howrah, etc.

SAVE has sent thousands of communications to colleges as well.

=== Supporting & Empowering the victims and their families ===
For about a decade, SAVE has been supporting the victims of ragging and/or their families in various ways. SAVE volunteers have supported victims in getting their grievances heard. They have played active roles in creating pressure on colleges to take actions and have provided legal and other guidance and assistance to the victims and their families. SAVE keeps in touch with the National (UGC) Anti Ragging Helpline and with its monitoring agency.

SAVE has filed numerous applications under the Right to Information Act, 2005 with institutions as well as statutory bodies. SAVE legal team, led by advocate Mrs. Meera Kaura Patel, has even represented victims in the court and before the National Human Rights Commission of India.

In a case involving the School of Planning and Architecture, Delhi, following the directions from the court, the police had booked the Dean, Director and Registrar were charged under IPC Sections 336, 337, 338 (negligence), 120B (conspiracy), 201 (tampering with evidence), 202, 176 (failing to inform a public authority) and 511 (attempting to commit offence).

In another case, from Thanjavur, SAVE Legal Team had requested the Chief Justice of Tamil Nadu to take suo motu cognizance of the matter. Five engineering students were arrested later.

In some cases, SAVE has collaborated with the friends and family members of 'victims', who had lost their lives in 'ragging', to arrange memorial events and to demand proper investigation into the cases. The events were clubbed with signature campaigns seeking a comprehensive national anti ragging legislation.

In many cases, the colleges have taken actions based on SAVE's recommendations. Some Colleges have been proactively invited SAVE to address their students and faculties. Several colleges have invited SAVE to be part of their anti ragging committee, however it was not possible for SAVE to accept all such offers, considering its limitations, e.g., financial limitations.

=== Other Activities ===
- Guidance: SAVE extends technical guidance to academic institutions and others on curbing the menace of ragging.
- Research & Training

== Recognition ==
- Apart from wide acceptance by academic institutions, students, teachers and other stakeholders, SAVE has featured in several news reports by the national print media, electronic media as well as by the international media.
- SAVE was invited to the famous Indian television show Satyamev Jayate season 3, Episode 6 - which is anchored by Indian superstar Aamir Khan. SAVE's national co-ordinator Gaurav Singhal (an alumnus of the IIT-Kanpur) represented SAVE on the show. Some past victims, who were in contact with SAVE and the father of Amit Gangwar (the death of whom led to the birth of SAVE) took part in the show. Satyamev Jayate published an article on their website recommending SAVE.
- SAVE's honorary legal head, advocate Meera Kaura Patel has been a key speaker at a national Seminar organized by the National Human Rights Commission of India .
- Several Bollywood celebrities, like Salman Khan, Amole Gupte, Amrita Rao and Suniel Shetty have supported the movement as well.
- SAVE members have been invited to speak at various institutions as well as at international events.

== Tax exemption status ==
SAVE is registered with the department of Income tax in India u/s 12AA . Donations to the Society Against Violence in Education qualify for Tax exemption u/s 80G(5)(vi) .

== See also ==
- Ragging
- Ragging in India
