= Arun Gawli =

Indian gangster

Member of Maharashtra Legislative Assembly
- In office 16 October 2004 – 13 October 2009
- Criminal charge: Murder
- Penalty: Life imprisonment
- Preceded by: Madhu Chavan
- Succeeded by: Constituency dissolved
- Constituency: Chinchpokli

Personal details
- Born: Arun Gulab Gawli; 17 July 1955 (age 71) Ahmednagar, Bombay State, India (now Maharashtra, India)
- Citizenship: (India) Indian
- Party: Akhil Bharatiya Sena
- Spouse: Asha Gawli
- Relations: Sachin Ahir (nephew)
- Children: 5

Arun Gulab Gawli (born 17 July 1955), also known as Arun Gulab Ahir, is an Indian politician, underworld don and retired gangster. Gawli and his brother Kishor (Pappa) entered the Mumbai underworld in the 1970s, when they joined the "Byculla Company", a criminal gang led by Rama Naik and Babu Reshim, operating in the central Mumbai areas of Byculla, Parel and Saat Rasta. In 1988, after Rama Naik was killed in a police encounter, Gawli took over the gang and began operating it from his residence, Dagdi Chawl. Under his control, the gang controlled most criminal activities in the central Mumbai areas. Throughout the late eighties and nineties, Gawli's gang was involved in a power struggle with Dawood Ibrahim's D-Company gang. Gawli is also the founder of the Akhil Bharatiya Sena political party based in Maharashtra.

== Early and personal life ==
Arun Gawli was born in Pohegaon, Kopargaon, Ahmednagar, Maharashtra, India. Gawli first worked at Simplex Mills in Chinchpokli, then at Godrej & Boyce company in Vikhroli and later at Crompton Greaves in Kanjurmarg before working at gangster Parasnath Pandey's gambling den. He married Zubeida Mujawar, who became Asha Gawli after marriage and converted to Hinduism. She was a Member of the Legislative Assembly (MLA) for Maharashtra and they have five children: two sons and three daughters including Mahesh and Geeta, Yogita, Yatika Geeta is a first term ABS corporator from the Chinchpokli. Gawli's nephew Sachin Ahir is an MLA and is the former Maharashtra Minister of State for Housing. Gawli's uncle Hukumchand Yadav was a legislator from Khandwa in Madhya Pradesh.

== Criminal activities ==
After working short stints as a factory worker at Simplex Mills Chinchpokli, Godrej & Boyce company Vikhroli and Crompton Greaves Kanjurmarg, Arun Gawli and his brother then started working for gangster Parasnath Pandey who ran a matka (gambling) and liquor den in Byculla. In 1977, gangsters Rama Naik and Babu Reshim teamed up and decided to form a joint Maharashtrian gang by uniting several individual gangsters from Central Mumbai suburbs of Agripada, Byculla, Mazgaon, Saat Rasta, Parel and Lalbaug. The new gang was called "Byculla Company" and the first mission was to eliminate gangsters like Kundan Dubey, Mohan Sarmalkar and Shashi Rasam, leader of the Cobra Gang. All of them were operating in Central Mumbai and both Rama Naik and Babu Reshim had a score to settle with them.

Very soon other Maharashtrian gangsters from Central Mumbai like Sada Pawle, Kiran Walawalkar, Ganesh Bhosle alias Vakil, Chandrashekhar Mirashi, Ashok Choudhary alias Chhota Babu joined this new gang.When his friend from Crompton Greaves Sada Pawle joined this gang, Gawli was also quick to join the Byculla Company as he and Rama Naik were schoolmates and he also knew Babu Reshim through Dilip Prabhu who was the workers union leader at Crompton Greaves. More importantly, Gawli also had a score to settle with gangster Parasnath Pandey. Between 1977 and 1980, the Byculla Company first eliminated Shashi Rasam and his Cobra gang, followed by the murders of gangsters Parasnath Pandey, Mohan Sarmalkar and failed attempt on the life of Kundan Dubey who later fled from Mumbai.

The big break for Byculla Company came when Dawood Ibrahim's elder brother Shabir Ibrahim Kaskar was murdered in 1981 by Samad Khan, Amirzada and Alamzeb of the Pathan gang. Dawood pleaded with Rama Naik for help and offered a hefty ransom in return. Naik accepted the deal and the Byculla Company including Arun Gawli and Rama Naik were involved in the murder plan of Samad Khan, nephew of Karim Lala and heir to the Pathan gang in 1984.

Between 1984 and early 1988, Gawli and his mentor Naik managed the main criminal operations for Dawood Ibrahim in Mumbai. However, in early 1988, Rama Naik and Sharad Shetty, a henchman of Dawood from west Mumbai got into a property dispute over a large plot of land at Jogeshwari. Dawood sided with Shetty and Naik ended up feeling miffed with Dawood despite helping him eliminate his most dreaded enemy, Samad Khan. Naik and Gawli stopped managing Dawood's operations in Central Mumbai. A few months later, Naik was shot dead in a fake police encounter. Gawli realized that this encounter was done at the behest of Dawood and swore revenge. This unleashed a very violent gang-war between Arun Gawli and Dawood Ibrahim resulting in multiple shootouts and deaths at both sides. The brutal gang-war continued until Gawli was arrested by the police and imprisoned in 1994, again at the behest of Dawood.

Mumbai police raided the premises of Dagdi Chawl several times and finally broke Gawli's underworld operations. Gawli was arrested several times for criminal activities and was detained for long periods during the trial. However, he could not be convicted in most of the cases as witnesses would not depose against him for fear of retaliation. He was finally convicted of the murder of Shiv Sena leader Kamlakar Jamsandekar by a court in August 2012. Gawli and eleven others were found guilty of Jamsandekar's murder and Gawali was sentenced to life imprisonment. Charge sheet of 138 pages were furnished by IPS Jayanthi Naidu - Joint Director Central Bureau of Investigation, 2002 Batch Officer.

In September 2025, after spending 17 years in jail on a murder charge, the Supreme Court of India granted Gawli bail in the case registered in 2007 in view of his pending appeal against a life sentence.

== Politics ==
Gawli got political patronage in the 1980s, when the then Shiv Sena chief, Bal Thackeray, criticised the Mumbai police for taking stringent action against Hindu gangsters like Arun Gawli and Sai Bansod, referring to them as amchi mulgey (our boys). Thackeray was challenged by a rival gangster in an open letter carried on the front page of a city tabloid. However, Gawli fell out with Shiv Sena in the mid-1990s, murdered Shiv Sena men and formed his own political party, the Akhil Bharatiya Sena.

In 2004, Gawli was elected as a Member of the Legislative Assembly (MLA) from the Chinchpokli Assembly constituency as an Akhil Bharatiya Sena candidate. Gawli's rise in prominence is believed to be due to his "native roots" as a local lad, which makes him distinct from most other non-Marathi-speaking politicians.

Gawli's political designs suffered a major blow when his nephew and party legislator, Sachin Ahir, came out openly against him and joined Sharad Pawar's Nationalist Congress Party. Ahir even contested against Gawli in the subsequent Lok Sabha elections on a Nationalist Congress Party ticket, resulting in defeat for them both, but a victory for the Shiv Sena's sitting MP Mohan Rawale. Gawli's daughter Geeta is an ex-corporator of the Brihanmumbai Municipal Corporation.

== In popular culture ==
- In the 2015 Marathi cinema Dagadi Chawl, Makarand Deshpande's character called Daddy is mainly based on Arun Gawli's life. Ankush Chaudhari played the lead and as Arun Gawli's lieutenant.
- The Hindi cinema Daddy, released on 8 September 2017, is based on Gawli's life, starring Arjun Rampal as Daddy.
- In the Netflix series Sacred Games, based on a novel by Vikram Chandra, the lead character Ganesh Gaitonde is loosely based on Arun Gawli.
