= Agripada =

- Neighbourhood
- Location within Mumbai
- Coordinates: 18.9777°N 72.8273°E
- Country: India
- State: Maharashtra
- District: Mumbai City
- City: Mumbai

Government
  - Type: Municipal Corporation
  - Body: Brihanmumbai Municipal Corporation (MCGM)

Languages
  - Official: Marathi
- Time zone: UTC+5:30 (IST)
- PIN: 400011
- Area code: 022
- Vehicle registration: MH 01
- Civic agency: BMC

Agripada is an area in South Mumbai. It is located between Byculla (West) and Mumbai Central (East). This area is connected with the Central Railway as well as the Western Railway. Agripada is also notable for its YMCA which has a swimming pool and various indoor and outdoor sports facilities. A large number of schools, including municipal schools, convents, Marathi, Hindi and English medium schools are located in this area.

Maratha Mandir is the nearest cinema hall. The other surrounding areas are Mumbai Central, Byculla, Nagpada, Madanpura and Mahalaxmi. Agripada also has a large number of mosques, of which Arab Masjid Al-Madina Masjid and Jamai Ahl-e Hadees Masjid are the most famous.
