= SAVE-study =

SAVE (Sparen und Altersvorsorge in Deutschland) is a representative data collection about private households’ saving behaviour in Germany. The survey was conducted in 2001 for the first time.

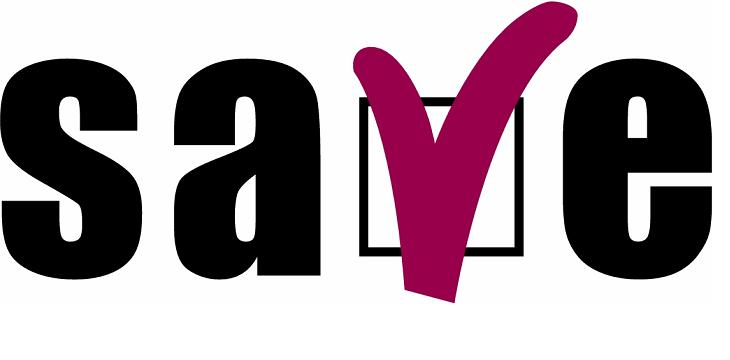

Sparen und Altersvorsorge in Deutschland

Director
Axel Börsch-Supan
Initiation
2001
Institution
Munich Center for the Economics of Aging (MEA),
Max-Planck-Institute for Social Law and Social Policy
Address
Amalienstr. 33
80799 München
Germany
Website
http://www.mea.mpisoc.mpg.de

== About the study ==
In order to improve the research concerning the saving behavior of German households, the Munich Center for the Economics of Aging (MEA) conducts the SAVE survey since 2001 in collaboration with TNS Infratest Sozialforschung. Until 2010, the survey was financed by the Deutsche Forschungsgemeinschaft (DFG). It lays its main emphasis on saving behaviour, old-age provision and wealth creation in Germany. The SAVE-study makes it possible to explore economic, sociological and psychological interdependences. This means that it collects information about income, wealth and old-age provision and about socio-demographic and psychological characteristics. This information includes e.g. expectations, attitudes and the attitude towards risk of the respondents. Since 2005 SAVE is conducted annually. Since respondents remain the same every year (panel), changes in saving behaviour and investment behaviour of households can be tracked over time. The ninth survey for 2011 was conducted in collaboration with the Institute for Employment Research (IAB in Nuremberg, Germany) (http://www.iab.de/en/), which is the research institute of the Federal Employment Agency. This cooperation lead to the linking of information about employment status and social security contributions to answers in SAVE.

== Sample size ==
Launching the sample in 2001 it was continuously extended in 2003, 2005 and 2006 by inclusion of a new set of households. By the year 2006 the panel reached a high level of stability. In 2007 84% of German households who also participated in 2006 could be interviewed again. In 2008 and 2009 the response rate was even better, namely 89% and 85%. In 2011, 81% of 2010 Respondents were surveyed. Overall, 55% of the participants added in the 2005 refreshment sample, were still in the sample in 2010. The sample size per year is shown in the following table.

Year	2001	2003/04	2005	2006	2007	2008	2009	2010	2011
No. of households	1829	3154	2305	3474	2931	2608	2222	2037	1660

== Range of topics ==
The SAVE study can help to improve research in various areas. The following list shows in detail which topics are covered by the questionnaire:

- Satisfaction with current life situation
- Socio-demographic information
- Social environment (2005–2008)
- Health (since 2005)
- Qualitative and quantitative questions about saving behaviour
- Financial literacy (2007/2008, extensive section in 2009)
- Consumption behaviour (2003/2004)
- Qualitative und quantitative questions concerning regular and exceptional income
- Old-age provision, retirement, entitlements (every year, design changed slightly over time)
- Financial assets, private old-age provision, real estate assets, business assets, etc.
- Three pillars of old age provision (statutory occupational, and private) with large sections about Riester pension in 2008 and 2010
- Credits and mortgages
- Expectations, self-assessment, psychological and sociological determinants of saving behaviour, preferences
- Financial crisis (2009/2010)
- Interview situation

== Access to the dataset ==
The SAVE-dataset is made available to the public by the GESIS - Leibniz-Institut für Sozialwissenschaften for non-commercial use only. Anonymity of the respondents is ensured by all means. Further information about the SAVE-dataset is available on the SAVE homepage where e.g. the yearly questionnaires can be downloaded. There also exists another dataset called „miniSAVE" for the years 2005-2010 which is especially useful for teaching purposes. MiniSAVE provides an easy way to get to know the dataset.

Usage of the dataset linked to the administrative data is subject to several confidentiality rules (see ). After the request has been approved by the Federal Ministry of Labour and Social Affairs (BMAS), a contract with the Research Data Centre (FDZ) of the Federal Employment Agency (BA) at the Institute for Employment Research (IAB) allowing the researcher to use the requested dataset on-site has to be signed.

== Literature ==
The results of the SAVE study are published by scientific journals and specialist books as well as by certain types of media addressing the public. A comprehensive list of publications associated with the SAVE survey can be found on the SAVE homepage. The list below provides a selection of publications associated with the SAVE survey:

- Börsch-Supan, A.; Essig, L. (2003): Household Saving in Germany: Results of the first SAVE Study. In: Wise, David (ed.), Analyses in the Economic of Aging, University of Chicago Press, Chicago. doi:10.3386/w9902
- Börsch-Supan, A., A. Reil-Held und D. Schunk (2007): Das Sparverhalten deutscher Haushalte: Erste Erfahrungen mit der Riester-Rente. Gutachten für das Bundesministerium für Bildung und Forschung. Artikel
- Börsch-Supan, Axel, Reil-Held, Anette und Daniel Schunk (2008): Saving incentives, old-age provision and displacement effects: Evidence from the recent German pension reform. Journal of Pension Economics and Finance, 7(3), 295-319. doi:10.1017/S1474747208003636
- Coppola, M. (2008): Das Sparverhalten der deutschen Haushalte. MEA Policy Brief no. 5. Artikel
- Scheubel, B; Winter, Joachim (2008): Rente mit 67: Wie lange die Deutschen arbeiten können und wollen. ifo Schnelldienst 2008(1), 26-32. Artikel
- Ziegelmeyer, Michael (2010): Das Altersvorsorge-Verhalten von Selbständigen - eine Analyse auf Basis der SAVE-Daten. Schmollers Jahrbuch, 130(2), 195-239. Artikel

To gain a more profound insight into what SAVE is all about, the structure of the questionnaire, the interview mode, item-nonresponse and representativeness of the sample used, one should also consider the following study:

- Börsch-Supan, A., M. Coppola, L. Essig, A. Eymann, D. Schunk (2008): The German SAVE study. Design and Results. MEA Study Nr. 6, MEA Mannheim. Artikel
- Ziegelmeyer, Michael (2012): „Illuminate the unknown: Evaluation of imputation procedures based on the SAVE Survey”, Advances in Statistical Analysis, doi:10.1007/s10182-012-0197-2
- Busl, Claudia; Iliewa, Zwetelina; Jokisch, Sabine; Kappler, Marcus; Roscher, Thomas; Schindler, Felix; Schleer, Frauke (2012): “Sparen und Investieren vor dem Hintergrund des demografischen Wandels” Report for the German Federal Ministry of Finance, Berlin.
